= Results of the 2021 Malacca state election =

Malaysian state election results

These are the election results of the 2021 Malacca state election. The elections was held in Malacca on 20 November 2021. Voting officially closed after 5.30pm that day. Elected members of the legislative assembly (MLAs) will be representing their constituency from the first sitting of respective state legislative assembly to its dissolution.

The state legislature election deposit was set at RM5,000 per candidate. Similar to previous elections, the election deposit will be forfeited if the particular candidate had failed to secure at least 12.5% or one-eighth of the votes.

== Map ==
Map of constituencies by winning faction

== Full result ==
| # | Constituency | Registered Electors | Winner | Votes | Votes % | Majority | Opponent(s) | Votes | Votes % | Total valid votes | Incumbent |
BN 21 | PH 5 | PN 2 | PUTRA 0 | IMAN 0 | Independent 0
| N01 | Kuala Linggi | 10,928 | Rosli Abdullah (BN–UMNO) | 3,554 | 51.00% | 1,836 | Julasapiyah Kassim (PH–AMANAH) | 1,718 | 24.66% | 6,968 | Ismail Othman (BN–UMNO) |
| N01 | Kuala Linggi | 10,928 | Rosli Abdullah (BN–UMNO) | 3,554 | 51.00% | 1,836 | Aziah Mohd Sa'ad (PN–PAS) | 1,645 | 23.61% | 6,968 | Ismail Othman (BN–UMNO) |
| N01 | Kuala Linggi | 10,928 | Rosli Abdullah (BN–UMNO) | 3,554 | 51.00% | 1,836 | Kamisan Palil (IND) | 51 | 0.73% | 6,968 | Ismail Othman (BN–UMNO) |
| N02 | Tanjung Bidara | 10,133 | Ab Rauf Yusoh (BN–UMNO) | 3,559 | 49.14% | 364 | Mas Ermieyati Samsudin (PN–BERSATU) | 3,195 | 44.11% | 7,243 | Md Rawi Mahmud (BN–UMNO) |
| N02 | Tanjung Bidara | 10,133 | Ab Rauf Yusoh (BN–UMNO) | 3,559 | 49.14% | 364 | Zainal Hassan (PH–PKR) | 489 | 6.75% | 7,243 | Md Rawi Mahmud (BN–UMNO) |
| N03 | Ayer Limau | 11,227 | Hameed Mytheen Kunju Basheer (BN–UMNO) | 3,838 | 51.94% | 1,085 | Noordina Abd Latif (PN–BERSATU) | 2,753 | 37.25% | 7,389 | Amiruddin Yusop (BN–UMNO) |
| N03 | Ayer Limau | 11,227 | Hameed Mytheen Kunju Basheer (BN–UMNO) | 3,838 | 51.94% | 1,085 | Maznah Baharuddin (PH–AMANAH) | 798 | 10.80% | 7,389 | Amiruddin Yusop (BN–UMNO) |
| N04 | Lendu | 10,561 | Sulaiman Md Ali (BN–UMNO) | 4,486 | 63.87% | 3,104 | Abdullah Mahadi (PN–BERSATU) | 1,382 | 19.68% | 7,023 | Sulaiman Md Ali (BN–UMNO) |
| N04 | Lendu | 10,561 | Sulaiman Md Ali (BN–UMNO) | 4,486 | 63.87% | 3,104 | Mohamad Asri Ibrahim (PH–PKR) | 1,155 | 16.45% | 7,023 | Sulaiman Md Ali (BN–UMNO) |
| N05 | Taboh Naning | 8,661 | Zulkiflee Mohd Zin (BN–UMNO) | 3,170 | 57.23% | 1,825 | Abu Hashim Abdul Samad (PN–PAS) | 1,345 | 24.28% | 5,539 | Latipah Omar (BN–UMNO) |
| N05 | Taboh Naning | 8,661 | Zulkiflee Mohd Zin (BN–UMNO) | 3,170 | 57.23% | 1,825 | Zairi Suboh (PH–AMANAH) | 1,155 | 16.45% | 5,539 | Latipah Omar (BN–UMNO) |
| N06 | Rembia | 15,756 | Muhammad Jailani Khamis (BN–UMNO) | 4,224 | 41.60% | 860 | Zamri Pakiri (PH–PKR) | 3,364 | 33.14% | 10,152 | Muhammad Jailani Khamis (BN–UMNO) |
| N06 | Rembia | 15,756 | Muhammad Jailani Khamis (BN–UMNO) | 4,224 | 41.60% | 860 | Zamzuri Ariffin (PN-BERSATU) | 2,433 | 23.97% | 10,152 | Muhammad Jailani Khamis (BN–UMNO) |
| N06 | Rembia | 15,756 | Muhammad Jailani Khamis (BN–UMNO) | 4,224 | 41.60% | 860 | Sabarudin Kudus (IND) | 67 | 0.66% | 10,152 | Muhammad Jailani Khamis (BN–UMNO) |
| N06 | Rembia | 15,756 | Muhammad Jailani Khamis (BN–UMNO) | 4,224 | 41.60% | 860 | Murali Krishnan (IND) | 64 | 0.63% | 10,152 | Muhammad Jailani Khamis (BN–UMNO) |
| N07 | Gadek | 12,641 | Shanmugam Ptcyhay (BN–MIC) | 3,022 | 39.36% | 559 | Saminathan Ganesan (PH–DAP) | 2,463 | 32.08% | 7,677 | Saminathan Ganesan (PH–DAP) |
| N07 | Gadek | 12,641 | Shanmugam Ptcyhay (BN–MIC) | 3,022 | 39.36% | 559 | Mohd. Amir Fitri Muharram (PN-BERSATU) | 2,041 | 26.59% | 7,677 | Saminathan Ganesan (PH–DAP) |
| N07 | Gadek | 12,641 | Shanmugam Ptcyhay (BN–MIC) | 3,022 | 39.36% | 559 | Laila Norinda Maun (PUTRA) | 68 | 0.89% | 7,677 | Saminathan Ganesan (PH–DAP) |
| N07 | Gadek | 12,641 | Shanmugam Ptcyhay (BN–MIC) | 3,022 | 39.36% | 559 | Azafen Amin (IND) | 60 | 0.78% | 7,677 | Saminathan Ganesan (PH–DAP) |
| N07 | Gadek | 12,641 | Shanmugam Ptcyhay (BN–MIC) | 3,022 | 39.36% | 559 | Mohan Singh Booda Singh (IND) | 23 | 0.30% | 7,677 | Saminathan Ganesan (PH–DAP) |
| N08 | Machap Jaya | 12,487 | Ngwe Hee Sem (BN–MCA) | 3,732 | 46.68% | 938 | Law Bing Haw (PH–PKR) | 2,794 | 34.94% | 7,996 | Ginie Lim Siew Lin (PH–PKR) |
| N08 | Machap Jaya | 12,487 | Ngwe Hee Sem (BN–MCA) | 3,732 | 46.68% | 938 | Tai Siong Jiul (PN-BERSATU) | 1,202 | 15.03% | 7,996 | Ginie Lim Siew Lin (PH–PKR) |
| N08 | Machap Jaya | 12,487 | Ngwe Hee Sem (BN–MCA) | 3,732 | 46.68% | 938 | Abdul Aziz Osani Kasim (IMAN) | 167 | 2.09% | 7,996 | Ginie Lim Siew Lin (PH–PKR) |
| N08 | Machap Jaya | 12,487 | Ngwe Hee Sem (BN–MCA) | 3,732 | 46.68% | 938 | Azlan Daud (IND) | 101 | 1.26% | 7,996 | Ginie Lim Siew Lin (PH–PKR) |
| N09 | Durian Tunggal | 13,312 | Zahari Abdul Khalil (BN–UMNO) | 3,663 | 40.56% | 559 | Mohd Sofi Abdul Wahab (PH–AMANAH) | 3,104 | 34.36% | 9,033 | Mohd Sofi Abdul Wahab (PH–AMANAH) |
| N09 | Durian Tunggal | 13,312 | Zahari Abdul Khalil (BN–UMNO) | 3,663 | 40.56% | 559 | Ja'afar Othman (PN–PAS) | 2,208 | 24.44% | 9,033 | Mohd Sofi Abdul Wahab (PH–AMANAH) |
| N09 | Durian Tunggal | 13,312 | Zahari Abdul Khalil (BN–UMNO) | 3,663 | 40.56% | 559 | Mohd Erfan Mahrilar (IND) | 58 | 0.64% | 9,033 | Mohd Sofi Abdul Wahab (PH–AMANAH) |
| N10 | Asahan | 15,745 | Fairul Nizam Roslan (BN–UMNO) | 5,659 | 56.78% | 2,993 | Idris Haron (PH–PKR) | 2,666 | 26.75% | 9,968 | Abdul Ghafar Atan (BN–UMNO) |
| N10 | Asahan | 15,745 | Fairul Nizam Roslan (BN–UMNO) | 5,659 | 56.78% | 2,993 | Dhanesh Basil (PN-GERAKAN) | 1,364 | 13.68% | 9,968 | Abdul Ghafar Atan (BN–UMNO) |
| N10 | Asahan | 15,745 | Fairul Nizam Roslan (BN–UMNO) | 5,659 | 56.78% | 2,993 | Mohd Akhir Ayob (IND) | 136 | 1.36% | 9,968 | Abdul Ghafar Atan (BN–UMNO) |
| N10 | Asahan | 15,745 | Fairul Nizam Roslan (BN–UMNO) | 5,659 | 56.78% | 2,993 | Azmar Ab Hamid (IND) | 99 | 0.99% | 9,968 | Abdul Ghafar Atan (BN–UMNO) |
| N10 | Asahan | 15,745 | Fairul Nizam Roslan (BN–UMNO) | 5,659 | 56.78% | 2,993 | Mohd Noor Salleh (IND) | 44 | 0.44% | 9,968 | Abdul Ghafar Atan (BN–UMNO) |
| N11 | Sungai Udang | 22,793 | Mohd Aleef Yusof (PN–BERSATU) | 6,789 | 43.65% | 530 | Mohamad Ali Mohamad (BN–UMNO) | 6,259 | 40.24% | 15,554 | Idris Haron (IND) |
| N11 | Sungai Udang | 22,793 | Mohd Aleef Yusof (PN–BERSATU) | 6,789 | 43.65% | 530 | Hasmorni Tamby (PH–PKR) | 2,035 | 13.08% | 15,554 | Idris Haron (IND) |
| N11 | Sungai Udang | 22,793 | Mohd Aleef Yusof (PN–BERSATU) | 6,789 | 43.65% | 530 | Mohd Zahar Hashim (IND) | 471 | 3.03% | 15,554 | Idris Haron (IND) |
| N12 | Pantai Kundor | 15,469 | Tuminah Kadi @ Mohd Hasim (BN–UMNO) | 3,960 | 40.03% | 827 | Mohamad Ridzwan Mustafa (PN–BERSATU) | 3,133 | 31.67% | 9,892 | Nor Azman Hassan (IND) |
| N12 | Pantai Kundor | 15,469 | Tuminah Kadi @ Mohd Hasim (BN–UMNO) | 3,960 | 40.03% | 827 | Nor Azman Hassan (PH–AMANAH) | 2,799 | 28.30% | 9,892 | Nor Azman Hassan (IND) |
| N13 | Paya Rumput | 26,455 | Rais Yasin (BN–UMNO) | 6,830 | 39.69% | 629 | Shamsul Iskandar Md. Akin (PH–PKR) | 6,201 | 36.03% | 17,211 | Mohd Rafiq Naizamohideen (PN–BERSATU) |
| N13 | Paya Rumput | 26,455 | Rais Yasin (BN–UMNO) | 6,830 | 39.69% | 629 | Muhammad Faris Izwan Mazlan (PN-BERSATU) | 3,972 | 23.08% | 17,211 | Mohd Rafiq Naizamohideen (PN–BERSATU) |
| N13 | Paya Rumput | 26,455 | Rais Yasin (BN–UMNO) | 6,830 | 39.69% | 629 | Mohd Jaini Dimon (IND) | 127 | 0.73% | 17,211 | Mohd Rafiq Naizamohideen (PN–BERSATU) |
| N13 | Paya Rumput | 26,455 | Rais Yasin (BN–UMNO) | 6,830 | 39.69% | 629 | Muhammad Hashidi Mohd Zin (PUTRA) | 81 | 0.47% | 17,211 | Mohd Rafiq Naizamohideen (PN–BERSATU) |
| N14 | Kelebang | 19,976 | Lim Ban Hong (BN–MCA) | 5,028 | 38.49% | 876 | Gue Teck (PH–PKR) | 4,152 | 31.78% | 13,064 | Gue Teck (PH–PKR) |
| N14 | Kelebang | 19,976 | Lim Ban Hong (BN–MCA) | 5,028 | 38.49% | 876 | Bakri Jamaluddin (PN–PAS) | 3,884 | 29.73% | 13,064 | Gue Teck (PH–PKR) |
| N15 | Pengkalan Batu | 20,821 | Kalsom Noordin (BN–UMNO) | 4,839 | 35.77% | 131 | Muhamad Danish Zainudin (PH–DAP) | 4,708 | 34.80% | 13,528 | Norhizam Hassan Baktee (IND) |
| N15 | Pengkalan Batu | 20,821 | Kalsom Noordin (BN–UMNO) | 4,839 | 35.77% | 131 | Mohd Azrudin Md Idris (PN-BERSATU) | 2,681 | 19.82% | 13,528 | Norhizam Hassan Baktee (IND) |
| N15 | Pengkalan Batu | 20,821 | Kalsom Noordin (BN–UMNO) | 4,839 | 35.77% | 131 | Norhizam Hassan Baktee (IND) | 1,218 | 9.00% | 13,528 | Norhizam Hassan Baktee (IND) |
| N15 | Pengkalan Batu | 20,821 | Kalsom Noordin (BN–UMNO) | 4,839 | 35.77% | 131 | Mohd Aluwi Sari (PUTRA) | 82 | 0.61% | 13,528 | Norhizam Hassan Baktee (IND) |
| N16 | Ayer Keroh | 25,945 | Kerk Chee Yee (PH–DAP) | 9,459 | 59.98% | 5,624 | Yong Fun Juan (BN–MCA) | 3,835 | 24.31% | 15,773 | Kerk Chee Yee (PH–DAP) |
| N16 | Ayer Keroh | 25,945 | Kerk Chee Yee (PH–DAP) | 9,459 | 59.98% | 5,624 | Michael Gan Peng Lam (PN–GERAKAN) | 2,479 | 15.71% | 15,773 | Kerk Chee Yee (PH–DAP) |
| N17 | Bukit Katil | 25,410 | Adly Zahari (PH–AMANAH) | 6,805 | 41.55% | 1,057 | Hasnoor Sidang Husin (BN–UMNO) | 5,748 | 35.10% | 16,377 | Adly Zahari (PH–AMANAH) |
| N17 | Bukit Katil | 25,410 | Adly Zahari (PH–AMANAH) | 6,805 | 41.55% | 1,057 | Muhammad Al Afiz Yahya (PN–PAS) | 3,715 | 22.68% | 16,377 | Adly Zahari (PH–AMANAH) |
| N17 | Bukit Katil | 25,410 | Adly Zahari (PH–AMANAH) | 6,805 | 41.55% | 1,057 | Abdul Hamid Mustapah (IND) | 109 | 0.07% | 16,377 | Adly Zahari (PH–AMANAH) |
| N18 | Ayer Molek | 17,863 | Rahmad Mariman (BN–UMNO) | 6,348 | 51.07% | 2,802 | Mohd Fadly Samin (PN–BERSATU) | 3,546 | 28.53% | 12,430 | Rahmad Mariman (BN–UMNO) |
| N18 | Ayer Molek | 17,863 | Rahmad Mariman (BN–UMNO) | 6,348 | 51.07% | 2,802 | Mohd Rafee Ibrahim (PH–PKR) | 2,446 | 19.68% | 12,430 | Rahmad Mariman (BN–UMNO) |
| N18 | Ayer Molek | 17,863 | Rahmad Mariman (BN–UMNO) | 6,348 | 51.07% | 2,802 | Ahmad Muaz Idris (IND) | 90 | 0.72% | 12,430 | Rahmad Mariman (BN–UMNO) |
| N19 | Kesidang | 37,304 | Allex Seah Shoo Chin (PH–DAP) | 14,769 | 65.86% | 10,237 | Leong Hui Ying (BN–MCA) | 4,532 | 20.21% | 22,425 | Allex Seah Shoo Chin (PH–DAP) |
| N19 | Kesidang | 37,304 | Allex Seah Shoo Chin (PH–DAP) | 14,769 | 65.86% | 10,237 | Patrick Ng Chin Kae (PN–GERAKAN) | 3,124 | 13.93% | 22,425 | Allex Seah Shoo Chin (PH–DAP) |
| N20 | Kota Laksamana | 28,777 | Low Chee Leong (PH–DAP) | 13,508 | 80.83% | 11,494 | Benjamin Low Chin Hong (BN–MCA) | 2,014 | 12.05% | 16,712 | Low Chee Leong (PH–DAP) |
| N20 | Kota Laksamana | 28,777 | Low Chee Leong (PH–DAP) | 13,508 | 80.83% | 11,494 | Fong Khai Ling (PN–GERAKAN) | 1,190 | 7.12% | 16,712 | Low Chee Leong (PH–DAP) |
| N21 | Duyong | 18,237 | Mohd Noor Helmy Abdul Halem (BN–UMNO) | 4,684 | 38.56% | 200 | Damian Yeo Shen Li (PH–DAP) | 4,484 | 36.90% | 12,151 | Damian Yeo Shen Li (PH–DAP) |
| N21 | Duyong | 18,237 | Mohd Noor Helmy Abdul Halem (BN–UMNO) | 4,684 | 38.56% | 200 | Kamaruddin Sidek (PN-PAS) | 2,874 | 23.65% | 12,151 | Damian Yeo Shen Li (PH–DAP) |
| N21 | Duyong | 18,237 | Mohd Noor Helmy Abdul Halem (BN–UMNO) | 4,684 | 38.56% | 200 | Gan Tian Soh (IND) | 60 | 0.49% | 12,151 | Damian Yeo Shen Li (PH–DAP) |
| N21 | Duyong | 18,237 | Mohd Noor Helmy Abdul Halem (BN–UMNO) | 4,684 | 38.56% | 200 | Muhammad Hafiz Ishak (IND) | 57 | 0.47% | 12,151 | Damian Yeo Shen Li (PH–DAP) |
| N21 | Duyong | 18,237 | Mohd Noor Helmy Abdul Halem (BN–UMNO) | 4,684 | 38.56% | 200 | Mohd Faizal Hamzah (PUTRA) | 52 | 0.43% | 12,151 | Damian Yeo Shen Li (PH–DAP) |
| N22 | Bandar Hilir | 19,909 | Leng Chau Yen (PH–DAP) | 9,091 | 81.20% | 7,778 | Lee Kah Sean (BN–MCA) | 1,313 | 11.72% | 11,197 | Tey Kok Kiew (PH–DAP) |
| N22 | Bandar Hilir | 19,909 | Leng Chau Yen (PH–DAP) | 9,091 | 81.20% | 7,778 | Clarice Chan Ming Wang (PN–GERAKAN) | 634 | 5.66% | 11,197 | Tey Kok Kiew (PH–DAP) |
| N22 | Bandar Hilir | 19,909 | Leng Chau Yen (PH–DAP) | 9,091 | 81.20% | 7,778 | Mak Chee Kin (IND) | 159 | 1.42% | 11,197 | Tey Kok Kiew (PH–DAP) |
| N23 | Telok Mas | 20,712 | Abdul Razak Abdul Rahman (BN–UMNO) | 6,052 | 43.01% | 2,076 | Mohd Rafiq Naizamohideen (PN–BERSATU) | 3,976 | 28.25% | 14,370 | Noor Effandi Ahmad (IND) |
| N23 | Telok Mas | 20,712 | Abdul Razak Abdul Rahman (BN–UMNO) | 6,052 | 43.01% | 2,076 | Asyraf Mukhlis Minghat (PH–AMANAH) | 3,891 | 27.65% | 14,370 | Noor Effandi Ahmad (IND) |
| N23 | Telok Mas | 20,712 | Abdul Razak Abdul Rahman (BN–UMNO) | 6,052 | 43.01% | 2,076 | Muhammad Ariff Adly Mohammad (IND) | 153 | 1.09% | 14,370 | Noor Effandi Ahmad (IND) |
| N24 | Bemban | 18,573 | Mohd Yadzil Yaakub (PN–BERSATU) | 4,211 | 34.61% | 328 | Koh Chin Han (BN–MCA) | 3,883 | 31.91% | 12,169 | Wong Fort Pin (PH–DAP) |
| N24 | Bemban | 18,573 | Mohd Yadzil Yaakub (PN–BERSATU) | 4,211 | 34.61% | 328 | Tey Kok Kiew (PH–DAP) | 3,095 | 25.43% | 12,169 | Wong Fort Pin (PH–DAP) |
| N24 | Bemban | 18,573 | Mohd Yadzil Yaakub (PN–BERSATU) | 4,211 | 34.61% | 328 | Ng Choon Koon (IND) | 850 | 6.98% | 12,169 | Wong Fort Pin (PH–DAP) |
| N24 | Bemban | 18,573 | Mohd Yadzil Yaakub (PN–BERSATU) | 4,211 | 34.61% | 328 | Azmi Kamis (IND) | 130 | 1.07% | 12,169 | Wong Fort Pin (PH–DAP) |
| N25 | Rim | 13,672 | Khaidiriah Abu Zahar (BN–UMNO) | 4,037 | 45.30% | 1,327 | Azalina Abdul Rahman (PN–BERSATU) | 2,710 | 30.42% | 8,910 | Ghazale Muhamad (BN–UMNO) |
| N25 | Rim | 13,672 | Khaidiriah Abu Zahar (BN–UMNO) | 4,037 | 45.30% | 1,327 | Prasanth Kumar Brakasam (PH–PKR) | 2,163 | 24.28% | 8,910 | Ghazale Muhamad (BN–UMNO) |
| N26 | Serkam | 15,977 | Zaidi Attan (BN–UMNO) | 5,038 | 43.31% | 79 | Ahmad Bilal Rahaudin (PN–PAS) | 4,959 | 42.54% | 11,631 | Zaidi Attan (BN–UMNO) |
| N26 | Serkam | 15,977 | Zaidi Attan (BN–UMNO) | 5,038 | 43.31% | 79 | Mohd Kohmeni Kamal (PH–AMANAH) | 1,535 | 13.20% | 11,631 | Zaidi Attan (BN–UMNO) |
| N26 | Serkam | 15,977 | Zaidi Attan (BN–UMNO) | 5,038 | 43.31% | 79 | Norazlanshah Hazali (IND) | 99 | 0.85% | 11,631 | Zaidi Attan (BN–UMNO) |
| N27 | Merlimau | 14,014 | Muhamad Akmal Saleh (BN–UMNO) | 5,633 | 58.43% | 3,248 | Azrin Abdul Majid (PH–AMANAH) | 2,385 | 24.74% | 9,640 | Roslan Ahmad (BN–UMNO) |
| N27 | Merlimau | 14,014 | Muhamad Akmal Saleh (BN–UMNO) | 5,633 | 58.43% | 3,248 | Abd Alim Shapie (PN–PAS) | 1,622 | 16.83% | 9,640 | Roslan Ahmad (BN–UMNO) |
| N28 | Sungai Rambai | 11,837 | Siti Faizah Abdul Azis (BN–UMNO) | 3,801 | 48.09% | 1,137 | Muhammad Jefri Safry (PN–BERSATU) | 2,664 | 33.70% | 7,905 | Hasan Abd Rahman (BN–UMNO) |
| N28 | Sungai Rambai | 11,837 | Siti Faizah Abdul Azis (BN–UMNO) | 3,801 | 48.09% | 1,137 | Farzana Hayani Mohd Nasir (PH–PKR) | 1,356 | 17.15% | 7,905 | Hasan Abd Rahman (BN–UMNO) |
| N28 | Sungai Rambai | 11,837 | Siti Faizah Abdul Azis (BN–UMNO) | 3,801 | 48.09% | 1,137 | Nazatul Asyraf Md Dom (PUTRA) | 84 | 1.06% | 7,905 | Hasan Abd Rahman (BN–UMNO) |
