= 2021 Malacca state election =

Election in Malaysia

- 20 November 2021

All 28 seats to the Malacca State Legislative Assembly 15 seats needed for a majority
- Registered: 495,195
- Turnout: 65.85%
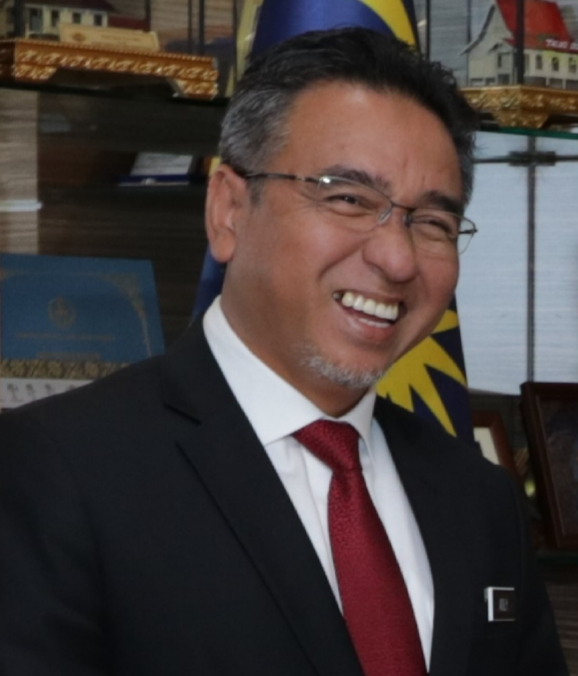

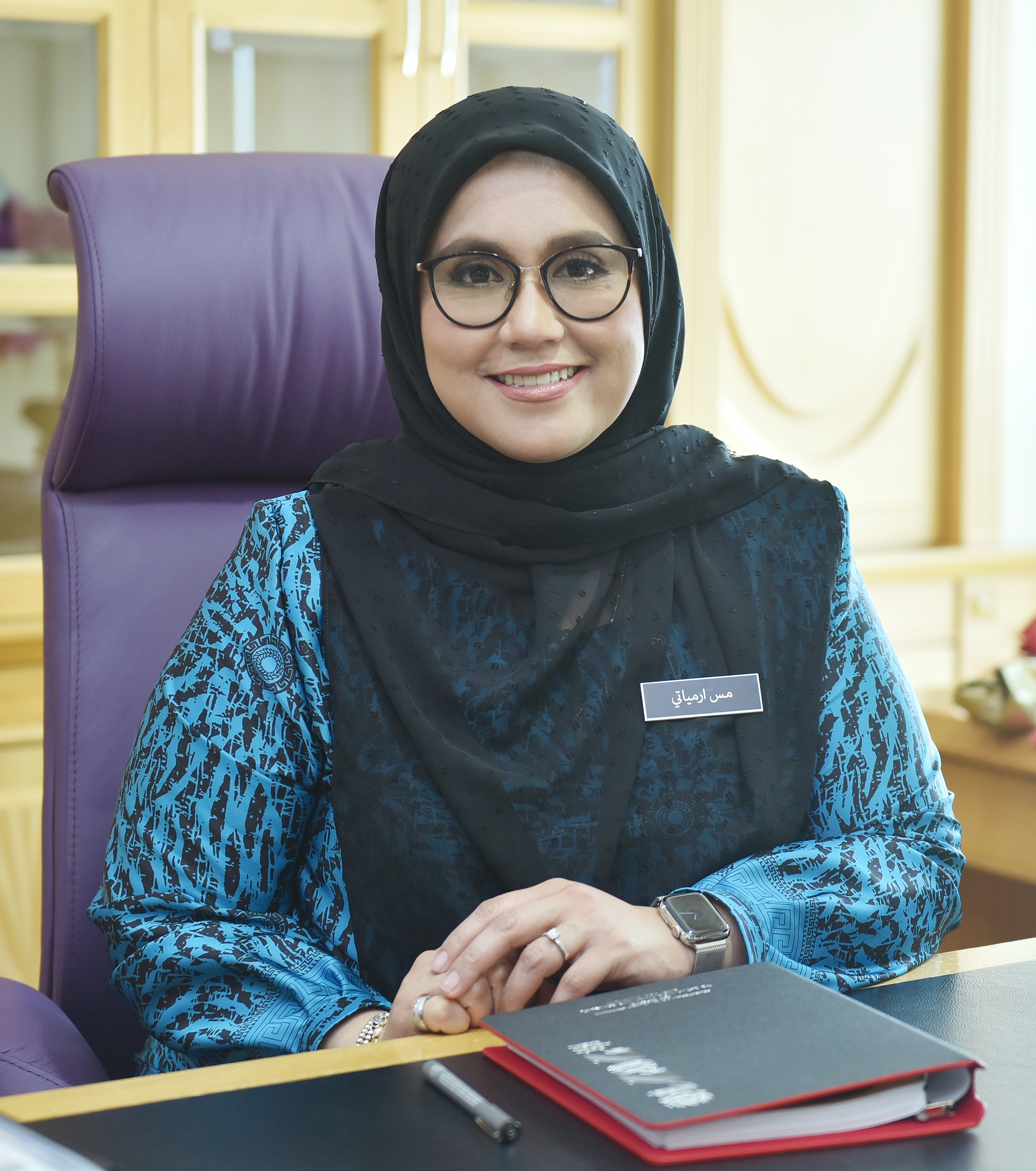
	Majority party	Minority party	Third party
	BN
Leader	Sulaiman Md Ali	Adly Zahari	Mas Ermieyati Samsudin
Party	UMNO	AMANAH	BERSATU
Alliance	Barisan Nasional	Pakatan Harapan	Perikatan Nasional
Leader since	9 March 2020	30 August 2017	18 November 2021
Leader's seat	Lendu	Bukit Katil	Tanjung Bidara (Contested and lost)
Last election	13 seats, 36.27% (Note: Excludes GERAKAN, which was part of the coalition in the 2018 election but subsequently left and later joined Perikatan Nasional in February 2021. The original number of seats and vote share held by Barisan Nasional as it was in 2018 was 13 seats and 37.84%, respectively.)	13 seats, 43.34% (Note: Excludes BERSATU, which was part of the coalition in the 2018 election but subsequently left and later formed Perikatan Nasional in 2020. The original number of seats and vote share held by Pakatan Harapan as it was in 2018 was 15 seats and 51.11%, respectively.)	2 seats, 20.12% (Note: New coalition formed in 2020. These numbers are the total seats and vote share of BERSATU, PAS and GERAKAN in the last election. The parties were previously part of Pakatan Harapan, Gagasan Sejahtera and Barisan Nasional respectively.)
Seats before	12	11	1
Seats won	21	5	2
Seat change	▲9	▼6	▲1
Popular vote	122,741	114,457	77,731
Percentage	38.39%	35.80%	24.31%
Swing	▲2.12 pp	▼7.54 pp	▲4.19 pp
- Results by constituency
Chief Minister before election
Sulaiman Md Ali
BN-PN coalition
Elected Chief Minister
Sulaiman Md Ali
BN

The 2021 Malacca state election, formally the 15th Malacca state election, took place on 20 November 2021. This election was to elect 28 members of the 15th Malacca State Legislative Assembly. The previous assembly was dissolved on 4 October 2021.

The snap election of the state was called prematurely following a political crisis. It came after four members of the assembly (MLA) who had previously supported incumbent Chief Minister Sulaiman Md Ali announced the loss of confidence and withdrawal of their support for him on 4 October 2021. They are former Chief Minister, Member of the State Executive Council (EXCO), Sungai Udang MLA Idris Haron and Pantai Kundor MLA Nor Azman Hassan from BN, independent (IND) EXCO member, Pengkalan Batu MLA Norhizam Hassan Baktee as well as EXCO member, Telok Mas MLA Noor Effandi Ahmad from PN.

Malacca became the fourth state in Malaysia (since 2021) that did not hold a state election simultaneously with the general election after Sabah (1967–1999 and since 2020), Sarawak (since 1979), and Kelantan (March 1978). This is also the first election following Ismail Sabri Yaakob's appointment as Prime Minister on 21 August 2021 and also the first state election held in the Malay Peninsula since the fall of the Pakatan Harapan state and federal governments in 2020.

This election was unique because it featured two major coalition parties in the government, namely Barisan Nasional and Perikatan Nasional, competing against each other. BN, through UMNO, had announced that it would not cooperate with Perikatan Nasional, led by Parti Peribumi Bersatu Malaysia (BERSATU). Such competition between former coalition partners had previously only occurred in East Malaysia.

Barisan Nasional (BN) won a landslide victory in the state election, winning 21 seats in the legislature and a two-thirds majority. Pakatan Harapan (PH) suffered a major defeat, winning just 5 seats, with the People's Justice Party (PKR) losing all its contested seats. Perikatan Nasional (PN) won 2 seats.

== Constituencies ==
Electoral map of Malacca, showing all 28 constituencies

== Composition before dissolution ==
Government		Opposition
BN	PN	PH			IND
12	1	11			4
12	1	7	2	2	4
UMNO	BERSATU	DAP	AMANAH	PKR	IND

== Electoral system ==
Elections in Malaysia are conducted at the federal and state levels. Federal elections elect members of the Dewan Rakyat, the lower house of Parliament, while state elections in each of the 13 states elect members of their respective state legislative assembly. As Malaysia follows the Westminster system of government, the head of government (Prime Minister at the federal level and the Menteri Besar/Chief Ministers at the state level) is the person who commands the confidence of the majority of members in the respective legislature – this is normally the leader of the party or coalition with the majority of seats in the legislature.

The Legislative Assembly consists of 28 members, known as Members of the Legislative Assembly (MLAs), that are elected for five-year terms. Each MLA is elected from a single-member constituencies using the first-past-the-post voting system; each constituency contains approximately an equal number of voters. If one party obtains a majority of seats, then that party is entitled to form the government, with its leader becoming the Chief Minister. In the event of a hung parliament, where no single party obtains the majority of seats, the government may still form through a coalition or a confidence and supply agreement with other parties. In practice, coalitions and alliances in Malaysia, and by extension, in Malacca, generally persist between elections, and member parties do not normally contest for the same seats.

== Political parties ==
Coalition(s)			Other parties
Government		Opposition	Other parties
Barisan Nasional (BN)	Perikatan Nasional (PN)	Pakatan Harapan (PH)	Malaysian Mighty Bumiputera Party (PUTRA); National Indian Muslim Alliance Party (IMAN)
United Malays National Organisation (UMNO); Malaysian Chinese Association (MCA); Malaysian Indian Congress (MIC)	Malaysian United Indigenous Party (Bersatu); Malaysian Islamic Party (PAS); Parti Gerakan Rakyat Malaysia (Gerakan)	Democratic Action Party (DAP); National Trust Party (Amanah); People's Justice Party (PKR)	Malaysian Mighty Bumiputera Party (PUTRA); National Indian Muslim Alliance Party (IMAN)

== Retiring incumbent ==
The following members of the 14th State Legislative Assembly retired.

No.	Federal Constituency	Departing MLA	Party	Date confirmed	First elected	Reason
N02	Tanjung Bidara	Md Rawi Mahmud	BN (UMNO)	10 October 2021	2013	Not seeking re-election
N01	Kuala Linggi	Ismail Othman	BN (UMNO)	4 November 2021	2008	No nomination by the party
N03	Ayer Limau	Amiruddin Yusop	BN (UMNO)	4 November 2021	2008	No nomination by the party
N05	Taboh Naning	Latipah Omar	BN (UMNO)	4 November 2021	2008	No nomination by the party
N10	Asahan	Abdul Ghafar Atan	BN (UMNO)	4 November 2021	2004	No nomination by the party
N25	Rim	Ghazale Muhamad	BN (UMNO)	4 November 2021	2008	No nomination by the party
N27	Merlimau	Roslan Ahmad	BN (UMNO)	4 November 2021	2011	No nomination by the party
N28	Sungai Rambai	Hasan Abd Rahman	BN (UMNO)	4 November 2021	2008	No nomination by the party
N24	Bemban	Wong Fort Pin	PH (DAP)	5 November 2021	2018	No nomination by the party
N08	Machap Jaya	Ginie Lim Siew Lin	PH (PKR)	6 November 2021	2018	No nomination by the party
N23	Telok Mas	Noor Effandi Ahmad	IND	8 November 2021	2018	Not seeking re-election

== Timeline ==
Date	Event
5 October 2021	Dissolution of the Malacca State Legislative Assembly
18 October 2021	Issue of the Writ of Election
8 November 2021	Nomination day
8–20 November 2021	Campaigning period
16–19 November 2021	Early voting for postal, overseas and advance voters
20 November 2021	Polling day

=== Pre-nomination events ===
Date	Event
4 October 2021	Four Malacca assemblymen declared that they have lost confidence in Chief Minister Sulaiman Md Ali's leadership. The assemblymen are former Malacca Chief Minister Idris Haron, Nor Azman Hassan, Norhizam Hassan Baktee and Noor Effandi Ahmad. Idris said the move was due to a series of decisions not implemented by the state government, which he added portrayed Malacca as a 'flip flop' state.
4 October 2021	The membership of Idris Haron and Nor Azman Hassan in UMNO was automatically dropped after being involved in the movement to overthrow the existing Malacca State Government.
5 October 2021	Malacca Assembly speaker disclosed that Malacca Chief Minister, Sulaiman Md Ali, took steps to dissolve the State Legislative Assembly starting 4 October 2021, in an effort to resolve the political crisis in the state. The dissolution of the state assembly was made after Sulaiman lost the majority of support, following the actions of four state assemblymen from the government bloc, withdrawing support for his leadership yesterday. The decision to dissolve the state assembly was made after the proposal submitted by Sulaiman received the approval of the Yang di-Pertua Negeri, Mohd Ali Rustam.
5 October 2021	Malacca PN chief Rafiq Naizmohideen announced immediate loss of Noor Effandi Ahmad's membership in BERSATU. The declaration was made due to his apparent cooperation with PH by being together with PH in a previous press conference on 4 October.
10 October 2021	Tanjung Bidara State Assemblyman Md Rawi Mahmud announces that he will not defend his constituency in the upcoming election.
18 October 2021	The Malaysian Election Commission sets 8 November as the nomination day and 20 November as the polling day; this provides for a minimum campaigning period of 12 days.
2 November 2021	A former member of the navy, Mohan Singh Booda Singh has announced his intention to contest as an independent for the Gadek state constituency.
5 November 2021	Democratic Action Party (DAP), a component party of the PH, names its candidates for 8 of the state constituencies in Malacca, namely Gadek, Pengkalan Batu, Ayer Keroh, Kesidang, Kota Laksamana, Duyong, Bandar Hilir, and Bemban.
6 November 2021	Barisan Nasional (BN) states that it will be contesting in all of the state constituencies in Malacca, and announces its candidates for the 28 seats.
6 November 2021	Malaysia Mighty Bumiputera Party (PUTRA) announces its candidates for 5 of the state constituencies.
6 November 2021	National Indian Muslim Alliance Party (IMAN) announces its sole electoral candidate, who will contest the Machap Jaya state constituency.
6 November 2021	Pakatan Harapan (PH) states that it will be contesting in all of the state constituencies in Malacca, and announces its candidates for the 20 seats.
6 November 2021	Perikatan Nasional (PN) states that it will be contesting in all of the state constituencies in Malacca, and announces its candidates for the 28 seats.
7 November 2021	Pengkalan Batu MLA Norhizam Hassan Baktee announces that he will retain his seat as an independent candidate.

== Electoral candidates ==
No.	Parliamentary Constituency	No.	State constituency	Incumbent State Assemblyman	Political parties							
No.	Parliamentary Constituency	No.	State constituency	Incumbent State Assemblyman	Barisan Nasional		Pakatan Harapan		Perikatan Nasional		Other parties/Independent	
No.	Parliamentary Constituency	No.	State constituency	Incumbent State Assemblyman	Candidate name	Party	Candidate name	Party	Candidate name	Party	Candidate name	Party
P134	Masjid Tanah	N01	Kuala Linggi	Ismail Othman (BN)	Rosli Abdullah	UMNO	Julasapiah Kasim	AMANAH	Aziah Mohd Sa'ad	PAS	Kamisan Palil¹	IND
P134	Masjid Tanah	N02	Tanjung Bidara	Md Rawi Mahmud (BN)	Ab Rauf Yusoh	UMNO	Zainal Hassan	PKR	Mas Ermieyati Samsudin	BERSATU	None	
P134	Masjid Tanah	N03	Ayer Limau	Amiruddin Yusop (BN)	Hameed Mytheen Kunju Basheer	UMNO	Mazenah Baharuddin	AMANAH	Noordina Abd Latif	BERSATU	None	
P134	Masjid Tanah	N04	Lendu	Sulaiman Md Ali (BN)	Sulaiman Md Ali	UMNO	Mohamad Asri Ibrahim	PKR	Abdullah Mahadi	BERSATU	None	
P134	Masjid Tanah	N05	Taboh Naning	Latipah Omar (BN)	Zulkiflee Mohd Zin	UMNO	Zairi Subuh	AMANAH	Abu Hashim Abdul Samad	PAS	None	
P135	Alor Gajah	N06	Rembia	Muhammad Jailani Khamis (BN)	Muhammad Jailani Khamis	UMNO	Zamri Pakiri	PKR	Zamzuri Arifin	BERSATU	Murali Krishnan	IND
P135	Alor Gajah	N06	Rembia	Muhammad Jailani Khamis (BN)	Muhammad Jailani Khamis	UMNO	Zamri Pakiri	PKR	Zamzuri Arifin	BERSATU	Sabarudin Kudus¹	IND
P135	Alor Gajah	N07	Gadek	Saminathan Ganesan (PH)	Shanmugam Ptcyhay	MIC	Saminathan Ganesan	DAP	Mohd. Amir Fitri Muharram	BERSATU	Laila Norinda Maon	PUTRA
P135	Alor Gajah	N07	Gadek	Saminathan Ganesan (PH)	Shanmugam Ptcyhay	MIC	Saminathan Ganesan	DAP	Mohd. Amir Fitri Muharram	BERSATU	Mohan Singh Booda Singh	IND
P135	Alor Gajah	N07	Gadek	Saminathan Ganesan (PH)	Shanmugam Ptcyhay	MIC	Saminathan Ganesan	DAP	Mohd. Amir Fitri Muharram	BERSATU	Azafen Amin¹	IND
P135	Alor Gajah	N08	Machap Jaya	Ginie Lim Siew Lin (PH)	Ngwe Hee Sem	MCA	Law Bing Haw	PKR	Tai Siong Jiul	BERSATU	Abdul Aziz Osani Kasim	IMAN
P135	Alor Gajah	N08	Machap Jaya	Ginie Lim Siew Lin (PH)	Ngwe Hee Sem	MCA	Law Bing Haw	PKR	Tai Siong Jiul	BERSATU	Azlan Daud¹	IND
P135	Alor Gajah	N09	Durian Tunggal	Mohd Sofi Abdul Wahab (PH)	Zahari Abdul Khalil	UMNO	Mohd Sofi Abdul Wahab	AMANAH	Ja'afar Othman	PAS	Mohd Erfan Mahrilar¹	IND
P135	Alor Gajah	N10	Asahan	Abdul Ghafar Atan (BN)	Fairul Nizam Roslan	UMNO	Idris Haron	PKR	Dhanesh Basil	GERAKAN	Mohd Noor Saleh	IND
P135	Alor Gajah	N10	Asahan	Abdul Ghafar Atan (BN)	Fairul Nizam Roslan	UMNO	Idris Haron	PKR	Dhanesh Basil	GERAKAN	Azmar Ab Hamid	IND
P135	Alor Gajah	N10	Asahan	Abdul Ghafar Atan (BN)	Fairul Nizam Roslan	UMNO	Idris Haron	PKR	Dhanesh Basil	GERAKAN	Mohd Akhir Ayob¹	IND
P136	Tangga Batu	N11	Sungai Udang	Idris Haron (IND)	Mohamad Ali Mohamad	UMNO	Hasmorni Tamby	PKR	Mohd Aleef Yusof	BERSATU	Mohd Zahar Hashim¹	IND
P136	Tangga Batu	N12	Pantai Kundor	Nor Azman Hassan (IND)	Tuminah Kadi @ Mohd Hasim	UMNO	Nor Azman Hassan	AMANAH	Mohamad Ridzwan Mustafa	BERSATU	None	
P136	Tangga Batu	N13	Paya Rumput	Md Rafiq Naizamohideen (PN)	Rais Yasin	UMNO	Shamsul Iskandar Md. Akin	PKR	Muhammad Faris Izwan Mazlan	BERSATU	Muhammad Hashidi Mohd Zin	PUTRA
P136	Tangga Batu	N13	Paya Rumput	Md Rafiq Naizamohideen (PN)	Rais Yasin	UMNO	Shamsul Iskandar Md. Akin	PKR	Muhammad Faris Izwan Mazlan	BERSATU	Mohd Jaini Dimon¹	IND
P136	Tangga Batu	N14	Kelebang	Gue Teck (PH)	Lim Ban Hong	MCA	Gue Teck	PKR	Bakri Jamaluddin	PAS	None	
P137	Hang Tuah Jaya	N15	Pengkalan Batu	Norhizam Hassan Baktee (IND)	Kalsom Noordin	UMNO	Muhamad Danish Zainudin	DAP	Mohd Azrudin Md Idris	BERSATU	Mohd Aluwi Sari	PUTRA
P137	Hang Tuah Jaya	N15	Pengkalan Batu	Norhizam Hassan Baktee (IND)	Kalsom Noordin	UMNO	Muhamad Danish Zainudin	DAP	Mohd Azrudin Md Idris	BERSATU	Norhizam Hassan Baktee	IND
P137	Hang Tuah Jaya	N16	Ayer Keroh	Kerk Chee Yee (PH)	Yong Fun Juan	MCA	Kerk Chee Yee	DAP	Micheal Gan Peng Lam	GERAKAN	None	
P137	Hang Tuah Jaya	N17	Bukit Katil	Adly Zahari (PH)	Hasnoor Sidang Husin	UMNO	Adly Zahari	AMANAH	Muhammad Al Afiz Yahya	PAS	Abdul Hamid Mustapah¹	IND
P137	Hang Tuah Jaya	N18	Ayer Molek	Rahmad Mariman (BN)	Rahmad Mariman	UMNO	Mohd Rafee Ibrahim	PKR	Mohd Fadly Samin	BERSATU	Ahmad Muaz Idris¹	IND
P138	Kota Melaka	N19	Kesidang	Allex Seah Shoo Chin (PH)	Leong Hui Ying	MCA	Allex Seah Shoo Chin	DAP	Patrick Ng Chin Kae	GERAKAN	None	
P138	Kota Melaka	N20	Kota Laksamana	Low Chee Leong (PH)	Benjamin Low Chin Hong	MCA	Low Chee Leong	DAP	Fong Khai Ling	GERAKAN	None	
P138	Kota Melaka	N21	Duyong	Damian Yeo Shen Li (PH)	Mohd Noor Helmy	UMNO	Damian Yeo Shen Li	DAP	Kamarudin Sedik	PAS	Mohd Faizal Hamzah	PUTRA
P138	Kota Melaka	N21	Duyong	Damian Yeo Shen Li (PH)	Mohd Noor Helmy	UMNO	Damian Yeo Shen Li	DAP	Kamarudin Sedik	PAS	Muhamad Hafiz Ishak¹	IND
P138	Kota Melaka	N21	Duyong	Damian Yeo Shen Li (PH)	Mohd Noor Helmy	UMNO	Damian Yeo Shen Li	DAP	Kamarudin Sedik	PAS	Gan Tian Soh	IND
P138	Kota Melaka	N22	Bandar Hilir	Tey Kok Kiew (PH)	Lee Kah Sean	MCA	Leng Chau Yen	DAP	Clarice Chan Ming Wang	GERAKAN	Mak Chee Kin	IND
P138	Kota Melaka	N23	Telok Mas	Noor Effandi Ahmad (IND)	Abdul Razak Abdul Rahman	UMNO	Asyraf Mukhlis Minghat	AMANAH	Md Rafiq Naizamohideen	BERSATU	Muhammad Ariff Adly Mohammad¹	IND
P139	Jasin	N24	Bemban	Wong Fort Pin (PH)	Koh Chin Han	MCA	Tey Kok Kiew	DAP	Mohd Yadzil Yaakub	BERSATU	Ng Choon Koon	IND
P139	Jasin	N24	Bemban	Wong Fort Pin (PH)	Koh Chin Han	MCA	Tey Kok Kiew	DAP	Mohd Yadzil Yaakub	BERSATU	Azmi Kamis	IND
P139	Jasin	N25	Rim	Ghazale Muhamad (BN)	Khaidiriah Abu Zahar	UMNO	Prasanth Kumar Brakasam	PKR	Azalina Abdul Rahman	BERSATU	None	
P139	Jasin	N26	Serkam	Zaidi Attan (BN)	Zaidi Attan	UMNO	Mohd Khomeini Kamal	AMANAH	Ahmad Bilal Rahaudin	PAS	Norazlanshah Hazali¹	IND
P139	Jasin	N27	Merlimau	Roslan Ahmad (BN)	Muhammad Akmal Saleh	UMNO	Azrin Ab Majid	AMANAH	Abd Alim Shapie	PAS	None	
P139	Jasin	N28	Sungai Rambai	Hasan Abd Rahman (BN)	Siti Faizah Abdul Aziz	UMNO	Farzana Hayani Mohd Nasir	PKR	Muhammad Jefri Safry	BERSATU	Nazatul Asyraf Md Dom	PUTRA

Note: ^{1}Independent candidates form 'Gagasan Bebas' informal Independent bloc and contested using the various symbols.

== Results ==
Party or alliance		Votes	%	Seats	+/–
Barisan Nasional	United Malays National Organisation	95,382	29.84	18	+5
Barisan Nasional	Malaysian Chinese Association	24,337	7.61	2	+2
Barisan Nasional	Malaysian Indian Congress	3,022	0.95	1	+1
Barisan Nasional	Total	122,741	38.39	21	+8
Pakatan Harapan	Democratic Action Party	61,577	19.26	4	–4
Pakatan Harapan	People's Justice Party	28,821	9.02	0	–3
Pakatan Harapan	National Trust Party	24,059	7.53	1	–1
Pakatan Harapan	Total	114,457	35.80	5	–8
Perikatan Nasional	Malaysian United Indigenous Party	46,688	14.60	2	0
Perikatan Nasional	Malaysian Islamic Party	22,252	6.96	0	0
Perikatan Nasional	Parti Gerakan Rakyat Malaysia	8,791	2.75	0	0
Perikatan Nasional	Total	77,731	24.31	2	–8
Parti Bumiputera Perkasa Malaysia		367	0.11	0	New
National Indian Muslim Alliance Party		167	0.05	0	New
Independents		4,226	1.32	0	0
Total		319,689	100.00	28	0
Valid votes		319,689	98.04		
Invalid/blank votes		6,379	1.96		
Total votes		326,068	100.00		
Registered voters/turnout		495,195	65.85		
Source: Dashboard SPR

↓
Barisan Nasional government (21)			Pakatan Harapan-led opposition (7)*
21			2	5
Barisan Nasional			Perikatan Nasional	Pakatan Harapan
18	2	1	2	1	4
UMNO	MCA	MIC	BERSATU	AMANAH	DAP
Malacca State Legislative Assembly, 20 November 2021 (28 seats)

=== By parliamentary constituency ===
Barisan Nasional won 4 of 6 parliamentary constituency, including Masjid Tanah and Alor Gajah, which is held by Perikatan Nasional and Tangga Batu, which is held by Pakatan Harapan.

No.	Constituency	Barisan Nasional	Pakatan Harapan	Perikatan Nasional	Member of Parliament
P134	Masjid Tanah	54.65%	15.43%	29.79%	Mas Ermieyati Samsudin
P135	Alor Gajah	45.29%	32.10%	20.63%	
P135	Alor Gajah	45.29%	32.10%	20.63%	Mohd Redzuan Md Yusof
P136	Tangga Batu	39.62%	27.26%	31.91%	Rusnah Aluai
P137	Hang Tuah Jaya	36.56%	39.00%	21.42%	Shamsul Iskandar Md. Akin
P138	Kota Melaka	25.10%	58.48%	15.40%	Khoo Poay Tiong
P139	Jasin	45.40%	20.96%	32.17%	Ahmad Hamzah

=== Seats that changed allegiance ===
No.	Seat	Previous Party (2018)	Current Party (2021)
N6	Rembia	Pakatan Harapan (PKR)	Barisan Nasional (UMNO)
N7	Gadek	Pakatan Harapan (DAP)	Barisan Nasional (MIC)
N8	Machap Jaya	Pakatan Harapan (PKR)	Barisan Nasional (MCA)
N9	Durian Tunggal	Pakatan Harapan (Amanah)	Barisan Nasional (UMNO)
N11	Sungai Udang	Barisan Nasional (UMNO)	Perikatan Nasional (Bersatu)
N13	Paya Rumput	Pakatan Harapan (Bersatu)	Barisan Nasional (UMNO)
N14	Kelebang	Pakatan Harapan (PKR)	Barisan Nasional (MCA)
N15	Pengkalan Batu	Pakatan Harapan (DAP)	Barisan Nasional (UMNO)
N21	Duyong	Pakatan Harapan (DAP)	Barisan Nasional (UMNO)
N23	Telok Mas	Pakatan Harapan (Bersatu)	Barisan Nasional (UMNO)
N24	Bemban	Pakatan Harapan (DAP)	Perikatan Nasional (Bersatu)

== Election pendulum ==
2021 Malacca state election

GOVERNMENT SEATS
Marginal
Pengkalan Batu	Kalsom Noordin	UMNO	35.77
Kelebang	Lim Ban Hong	MCA	38.29
Duyong	Mohd. Noor Helmy Abdul Halem	UMNO	38.55
Gadek	Shanmugam V. Pitchay	MIC	39.26
Paya Rumput	Rais Yasin	UMNO	39.68
Pantai Kundor	Tuminah Kadi @ Mohd Hashim	UMNO	40.03
Rembia	Muhammad Jailani Khamis	UMNO	41.61
Telok Mas	Abdul Razak Abdul Rahman	UMNO	43.01
Serkam	Zaidi Attan	UMNO	43.32
Rim	Khaidirah Abu Zahar	UMNO	45.31
Machap Jaya	Ngwe Hee Sem	MCA	46.67
Sungai Rambai	Siti Faizah Abd. Azis	UMNO	48.08
Tanjung Bidara	Ab. Rauf Yusoh	UMNO	49.14
Kuala Linggi	Rusli Abdullah	UMNO	51.07
Ayer Molek	Rahmad Mariman	UMNO	51.07
Ayer Limau	Hameed Mytheen Kunju Basheer	UMNO	51.94
Fairly safe
Taboh Naning	Zulkiflee Mohd. Zin	UMNO	57.23
Merlimau	Dr. Muhamad Akmal Salleh	UMNO	58.43
Safe
Lendu	Sulaiman Md. Ali	UMNO	63.87
Asahan	Fairul Nizam Roslan	UMNO	65.77

NON-GOVERNMENT SEATS
Marginal
Bemban	Dr. Mohd Yadzil Yaakub	BERSATU	34.60
Bukit Katil	Adly Zahari	AMANAH	41.55
Sungai Udang	Dr. Mohd. Aleef Yusof	BERSATU	43.65
Fairly safe
Ayer Keroh	Kerk Chee Yee	DAP	59.97
Safe
Kesidang	Allex Seah Shoo Chin	DAP	65.86
Kota Laksamana	Dr. Low Chee Leong	DAP	80.83
Bandar Hilir	Leng Chau Yen	DAP	81.19

== Aftermath ==
Sulaiman were sworn in as Chief Minister of Malacca for the second time, on the morning of 21 November, a day after the election. He holds the role until 30 March 2023, when he tendered his resignation letter to the Yang di-Pertua Negeri of Malacca. He was replaced by Ab Rauf Yusoh, MLA for Tanjung Bidara and the UMNO state leader of Malacca, who was sworn in on 31 March 2023. Six days after Ab Rauf's appointment, a minor EXCO reshuffle took place on 5 April, where 2 EXCO members were dropped and 3 EXCO members were added, including one Pakatan Harapan MLA, in a swearing in ceremony. The new EXCO lineup is to reflect the government pact between PH and BN after the general election in November 2022. In response to Rauf's appointment, Muhammad Jailani Khamis, one of the EXCO members dropped in the reshuffle announced his withdrawal of support to the Rauf-led state government, although he is not resigning from UMNO and requested to the party's disciplinary board to decide on his status. He later were suspended of his UMNO membership by the party's disciplinary board for 6 years after spotted attending PN's by-election campaign in Simpang Jeram and Pulai. This made Jailani quit the party and joined PAS in June 2023, but were only announced by PAS secretary general one year later in July 2024.

== See also ==
- Politics of Malaysia
- List of political parties in Malaysia
