= Zahari Abd Khalil =

Malaysian politician

Yang Berbahagia Datuk Zahari Abd Khalil DPSM

Deputy Member of the Malacca State Executive Council
- Incumbent
- Assumed office 6 April 2023 (Works, Infrastructure, Public Facilities and Transport)
- Governor: Mohd Ali Rustam
- Chief Minister: Ab Rauf Yusoh
- Member: Hameed Mytheen Kunju Basheer
- Preceded by: position established
- Constituency: Durian Tunggal

Member of the Malacca State Legislative Assembly for Durian Tunggal
- In office 20 November 2021 – 14 November 2026
- Preceded by: Mohd Sofi Abdul Wahab (PH–AMANAH)
- Majority: 559 (2021)

Personal details
- Party: United Malays National Organisation (UMNO)
- Other political affiliations: Barisan Nasional (BN)

Zahari bin Abd Khalil is a Malaysian politician who served as Deputy Member of the Malacca State Executive Council (EXCO) in the Barisan Nasional (BN) state administration under Chief Minister Ab Rauf Yusoh and Member Hameed Mytheen Kunju Basheer since April 2023. He has also served as Member of the Malacca State Legislative Assembly (MLA) for Durian Tunggal since November 2021.

== Political career ==
=== Candidate for the Malacca State Legislative Assembly (2021) ===
In the 2021 state election, Zahari Abd Khalil made his electoral debut after being nominated by BN to contest for the Durian Tunggal state seat. Zahari is contesting against Mohd Sofi Abdul Wahab of Pakatan Harapan, Ja'afar Othman of Perikatan Nasional and Independent candidate Mohd Erfan Mahrilar. He won the seat by gaining 3,663 votes with the majority of 559.

=== Deputy Member of the Malacca State Executive Council (2023) ===
On 6 April 2023, Zahari Abd Khalil was appointed by Chief Minister Ab Rauf as Deputy EXCO Member in charge of Works, Infrastructure, Public Facilities and Transport, deputising for EXCO Member Hameed Mytheen Kunju Basheer.

== Election results ==
Malacca State Legislative Assembly
Year	Constituency	Candidate	Votes	Pct	Opponent(s)	Votes	Pct	Ballots cast	Majority	Turnout
2021	N09 Durian Tunggal	Zahari Abd Khalil (UMNO)	3,663	40.55%	Mohd Sofi Abdul Wahab (AMANAH)	3,104	34.36%	9,267	559	69.61%
2021	N09 Durian Tunggal	Zahari Abd Khalil (UMNO)	3,663	40.55%	Ja'afar Othman (PAS)	2,208	24.44%	9,267	559	69.61%
2021	N09 Durian Tunggal	Zahari Abd Khalil (UMNO)	3,663	40.55%	Mohd Erfan Mahrilar (IND)	58	0.64%	9,267	559	69.61%

== Honours ==
- Malacca
  - Lieutenant of the Exalted Order of Malacca (DPSM) – Datuk (2024)
