= Malacca State Executive Council =

Malaysian state executive authority

- 2026–present
- Date formed: 15 November 2026

People and organisations
- Head of state: Mohd Ali Rustam
- Head of government: Ab Rauf Yusoh (BN–UMNO)
- Total no. of members: 11
- Member parties: Barisan Nasional (BN) government: Barisan Nasional (BN); United Malays National Organisation (UMNO); Malaysian Chinese Association (MCA); Malaysian Indian Congress (MIC); Perikatan Nasional (PN); Malaysian Islamic Party (PAS); National Vision Party (WAWASAN)
- Status in legislature: Coalition government 24 / 28
- Opposition parties: Pakatan Harapan (PH); Democratic Action Party (DAP)
- Opposition leader: TBA

History
- Legislature term: 15th Malaysian Parliament

The Malacca State Executive Council is the State Executive Council (or EXCO) as executive authority of the Government of Malacca, Malaysia. The Council comprises the Chief Minister, appointed by the Governor on the basis that he is able to command a majority in the Malacca State Legislative Assembly, a number of members made up of members of the Assembly, the State Secretary, the State Legal Adviser and the State Financial Officer.

This Council is similar in structure and role to the Cabinet of Malaysia, while being smaller in size. As federal and state responsibilities differ, there are a number of portfolios that differ between the federal and state governments.

Members of the Council are selected by the Chief Minister, appointed by the Governor. Unlike Sabah and Sarawak, the Council has no ministry, but instead a number of committees; each committee will take care of certain state affairs, activities and departments. Members of the Council are always the chair of a committee.

== Lists of full members ==
=== Ab Rauf II EXCO (since 2026) ===
==== Members ====
BN (10)	PN (1)
UMNO (8); MCA (1); MIC (1)	PAS (1)

Members since 15 November 2026 have been :

Name	Portfolio	Party	Constituency	Term start	Term end
Ab Rauf Yusoh (Chief Minister)	Economic Planning; Finance; Land Affairs; Investment; Industry	BN (UMNO)	Tanjung Bidara	15 November 2026	Incumbent
Muhamad Akmal Saleh	Science; Technology; Innovation; Digital Communications	BN (UMNO)	Merlimau	19 November 2026	Incumbent
Rais Yasin	Religious Affairs; Entrepreneur Development; Cooperatives; Consumer Affairs	BN (UMNO)	Sungai Udang	19 November 2026	Incumbent
Abdul Razak Abdul Rahman	Housing; Local Government; Rural Development	BN (UMNO)	Telok Mas	19 November 2026	Incumbent
Fairul Nizam Roslan	Tourism; Heritage; Culture; Unity	BN (UMNO)	Asahan	19 November 2026	Incumbent
Mohd Ridhwan Mohd Ali	Education; Higher Education; Technical, Vocational Education and Training (TVET) Development	BN (UMNO)	Ayer Molek	19 November 2026	Incumbent
Hameed Mytheen Kunju Basheer	Works; Infrastructure; Transport	BN (UMNO)	Ayer Limau	19 November 2026	Incumbent
Khaidirah Abu Zahar	Women Development; Family Development; Community Development	BN (UMNO)	Rim	19 November 2026	Incumbent
Lim Ban Hong	Health; Human Capital	BN (MCA)	Kelebang	19 November 2026	Incumbent
Nadarajah Sellappa	Youth; Sports; Non-governmental Organisations (NGOs)	BN (MIC)	Gadek	19 November 2026	Incumbent
Muhammad Ridzuan Mohd Sarif	Agriculture; Environment; Disaster Management	PN (PAS)	Bukit Katil	19 November 2026	Incumbent

==== Deputy Members ====
BN (11)	PN (1)
UMNO (10); MCA (1)	PAS (1)

Deputy Members since 6 April 2023 have been :

Name	Portfolio	Party	Constituency	Term start	Term end
Mohd Noor Helmy Abdul Halem	Economic Planning; Finance; Land Affairs; Investment; Industry	BN (UMNO)	Duyong	19 November 2026	Incumbent
Ngwe Hee Sem	Economic Planning; Finance; Land Affairs; Investment; Industry	BN (MCA)	Machap Jaya	19 November 2026	Incumbent
Ahmad Nor Azril Abd Aziz	Science; Technology; Innovation; Digital Communications	BN (UMNO)	Rembia	19 November 2026	Incumbent
Abdul Hakim Abdul Wahid	Religious Affairs; Entrepreneur Development; Cooperatives; Consumer Affairs	BN (UMNO)	Lendu	19 November 2026	Incumbent
Jazlee Pit	Housing; Local Government; Rural Development	BN (UMNO)	Sungai Rambai	19 November 2026	Incumbent
Azman Abdullah	Tourism; Heritage; Culture; Unity	BN (UMNO)	Serkam	19 November 2026	Incumbent
Tuminah Kadi	Education; Higher Education; Technical, Vocational Education and Training (TVET) Development	BN (UMNO)	Pantai Kundor	19 November 2026	Incumbent
Mustafa Musa	Works; Infrastructure; Transport	BN (UMNO)	Durian Tunggal	19 November 2026	Incumbent
Siti Aisyah Mahmood	Women Development; Family Development; Community Development	BN (UMNO)	Pengkalan Batu	19 November 2026	Incumbent
Zulkiflee Mohd Zin	Health; Human Capital	BN (UMNO)	Taboh Naning	19 November 2026	Incumbent
Rafie Ahmad	Youth; Sports; Non-governmental Organisations (NGOs)	PN (PAS)	Paya Rumput	19 November 2026	Incumbent
Rosli Abdullah	Agriculture; Environment; Disaster Management	BN (UMNO)	Kuala Linggi	19 November 2026	Incumbent

== Former members ==
=== Ab Rauf I EXCO (2023–2026) ===
==== Members ====
BN (10)	Vacant (1)
UMNO (8); MCA (1); MIC (1)	Vacant (1)

Members since 31 March 2023 have been :

Name	Portfolio	Party	Constituency	Term start	Term end
Ab Rauf Yusoh (Chief Minister)	Economic Planning; Finance; Land Affairs; Non-governmental Agencies; Investment; Industry; Technical, Vocational Education and Training (TVET) Development	BN (UMNO)	Tanjung Bidara	31 March 2023	15 November 2026
Rais Yasin (Senior Member)	Housing; Local Government; Drainage; Climate Change; Disaster Management	BN (UMNO)	Paya Rumput	5 April 2023	15 November 2026
Abdul Razak Abdul Rahman	Tourism; Heritage; Arts; Culture	BN (UMNO)	Telok Mas	5 April 2023	15 November 2026
Muhamad Akmal Saleh	Rural Development; Agriculture; Food Security	BN (UMNO)	Merlimau	5 April 2023	15 November 2026
Kalsom Noordin	Women Development; Family Development; Community Development	BN (UMNO)	Pengkalan Batu	5 April 2023	15 November 2026
Rahmad Mariman	Education; Higher Education; Religious Affairs	BN (UMNO)	Ayer Molek	5 April 2023	15 November 2026
Fairul Nizam Roslan	Science; Technology; Innovation; Digital Communications	BN (UMNO)	Asahan	5 April 2023	15 November 2026
Hameed Mytheen Kunju Basheer	Works; Infrastructure; Public Facilities; Transport	BN (UMNO)	Ayer Limau	5 April 2023	15 November 2026
Ngwe Hee Sem	Health; Human Resources; Unity	BN (MCA)	Machap Jaya	5 April 2023	15 November 2026
Shanmugam Ptcyhay	Youth; Sports; Non-governmental Organisations (NGOs)	BN (MIC)	Gadek	5 April 2023	15 November 2026
Allex Seah Shoo Chin	Entrepreneur Development; Cooperatives; Consumer Affairs	PH (DAP)	Kesidang	5 April 2023	14 July 2026

==== Deputy Members ====
BN (8)	Vacant (2)
UMNO (8)	Vacant (2)

Deputy Members since 6 April 2023 have been :

Name	Portfolio	Party	Constituency	Term start	Term end
Khaidhirah Abu Zahar	Economic Planning; Finance; Land Affairs; Non-governmental Agencies; Investment; Industry; Technical, Vocational Education and Training (TVET) Development	BN (UMNO)	Rim	6 April 2023	15 November 2026
Zulkiflee Mohd Zin	Housing; Local Government; Drainage; Climate Change; Disaster Management	BN (UMNO)	Taboh Naning	6 April 2023	15 November 2026
Zaidi Attan	Tourism; Heritage; Arts; Culture	BN (UMNO)	Serkam	6 April 2023	15 November 2026
Low Chee Leong	Rural Development; Agriculture; Food Security	PH (DAP)	Kota Laksamana	6 April 2023	14 July 2026
Leng Chau Yen	Women Development; Family Development; Community Development	PH (DAP)	Bandar Hilir	6 April 2023	14 July 2026
Rosli Abdullah	Education; Higher Education; Religious Affairs	BN (UMNO)	Kuala Linggi	6 April 2023	15 November 2026
Mohd Noor Helmy Abdul Halem	Science; Technology; Innovation; Digital Communications	BN (UMNO)	Duyong	6 April 2023	15 November 2026
Zahari Abd Khalil	Works; Infrastructure; Public Facilities; Transport	BN (UMNO)	Durian Tunggal	6 April 2023	15 November 2026
Siti Faizah Abdul Azis	Health; Human Resources; Unity	BN (UMNO)	Sungai Rambai	6 April 2023	15 November 2026
Tuminah Kadi	Entrepreneur Development; Cooperatives; Consumer Affairs	BN (UMNO)	Pantai Kundor	6 April 2023	15 November 2026

=== Sulaiman II EXCO (2021–2023) ===
BN (11)
- UMNO (9)
- MCA (1)
- MIC (1)

Members from 21 November 2021 to 31 March 2023 were :

Name	Portfolio	Party	Constituency	Term start	Term end
Sulaiman Md Ali (Chief Minister)	Economic Planning; Land Development; Finance; Government-Linked Companies Committee; Religious Affairs	UMNO	Lendu	21 November 2021	31 March 2023
Ab Rauf Yusoh (Senior Member)	Industry; Investment; Entrepreneurial Development; Cooperatives	UMNO	Tanjung Bidara	26 November 2021	31 March 2023
Muhammad Jailani Khamis	Tourism; Heritage and Culture	UMNO	Rembia	26 November 2021	31 March 2023
Rahmad Mariman	Works; Transport; Public Facilities; Infrastructure; Flood Management	UMNO	Ayer Molek	26 November 2021	31 March 2023
Zaidi Attan	Housing and Local Government; Environment	UMNO	Serkam	26 November 2021	31 March 2023
Abdul Razak Abdul Rahman	Agriculture and Agro-based Industry; Entrepreneurial Development; Regional and Rural Development	UMNO	Telok Mas	26 November 2021	31 March 2023
Shanmugam Ptcyhay	NGO; Youth; Sports	MIC	Gadek	26 November 2021	31 March 2023
Kalsom Noordin	Women Affairs; Family Development; Welfare Affairs	UMNO	Pengkalan Batu	26 November 2021	31 March 2023
Rais Yasin	Education; Science, Technology and Innovation	UMNO	Paya Rumput	26 November 2021	31 March 2023
Muhammad Akmal Saleh	Health; Anti-drugs	UMNO	Merlimau	26 November 2021	31 March 2023
Ngwe Hee Sem	Unity; Human Resources; Community Relations; Consumer Affairs	MCA	Machap Jaya	26 November 2021	31 March 2023

=== Sulaiman I EXCO (2020–2021) ===
BN (8)	PN (3)	Independent (1)
UMNO (8)	BERSATU (2)	Independent (1)

Members from 9 March 2020 to 21 November 2021 were :

Name	Portfolio	Party	Constituency	Term start	Term end
Sulaiman Md Ali (Chief Minister)	Finance; Land, Beach and River Development; Economic Planning; Religious Affairs; Water Management; Industry; Investment; Communication; Technology; Multimedia; State Related Agency	BN (UMNO)	Lendu	9 March 2020	21 November 2021
Mohd Rafiq Naizamohideen	Non-governmental Organisations; Youth and Sports	PN (BERSATU)	Paya Rumput	13 March 2020	21 November 2021
Abdul Ghafar Atan	Housing and Local Government; Environment	BN (UMNO)	Asahan	13 March 2020	21 November 2021
Roslan Ahmad	Public Works; Transport; Public Facilities; Infrastructure	BN (UMNO)	Merlimau	13 March 2020	21 November 2021
Muhammad Jailani Khamis	Tourism; Heritage and Culture	BN (UMNO)	Rembia	13 March 2020	21 November 2021
Latipah Omar	Women Affairs; Family Development; Welfare Affairs	BN (UMNO)	Taboh Naning	13 March 2020	21 November 2021
Rahmad Mariman	Health; Anti-drugs	BN (UMNO)	Ayer Molek	13 March 2020	21 November 2021
Idris Haron	Regional and Rural Development; Flood Management	BN (UMNO)	Sungai Udang	13 March 2020	4 October 2021
Norhizam Hassan Baktee	Agriculture and Agro-based Industry; Entrepreneurial Development	Independent	Pengkalan Batu	13 March 2020	4 October 2021
Noor Effandi Ahmad	Education; Science, Technology and Innovation; Green Technology	PN (BERSATU)	Telok Mas	13 March 2020	4 October 2021
Ismail Othman	Unity; Human Resources; Community Relations; Consumer Affairs	BN (UMNO)	Kuala Linggi	8 May 2020	21 November 2021

=== Adly EXCO (2018–2020) ===
PH (11)
- DAP (5)
- PKR (2)
- AMANAH (2)
- BERSATU (2)

Members from 11 May 2018 to 9 March 2020 were :

Name	Portfolio	Party	Constituency	Term start	Term end
Adly Zahari (Chief Minister)	Finance; Land; Economic Planning; Religious Affairs	AMANAH	Bukit Katil	11 May 2018	9 March 2020
Mohd Rafiq Naizamohideen	Industry; Trade; Investment	BERSATU	Paya Rumput	16 May 2018	9 March 2020
Tey Kok Kiew	Housing and Local Government; Environment	DAP	Bandar Hilir	16 May 2018	9 March 2020
Muhammad Jailani Khamis	Tourism; Heritage and Culture	PKR	Rembia	16 May 2018	9 March 2020
Mohd Sofi Abdul Wahab	Public Works; Transport; Public Facilities	AMANAH	Durian Tunggal	16 May 2018	9 March 2020
Saminathan Ganesan	Unity; Human Resources; Non-governmental Organisations; Consumer Affairs	DAP	Gadek	16 May 2018	9 March 2020
Norhizam Hassan Baktee	Agriculture and Agro-based Industry; Entrepreneur Development	DAP	Pengkalan Batu	16 May 2018	9 March 2020
Ginie Lim Siew Lin	Family Development; Welfare Affairs	PKR	Machap Jaya	16 May 2018	9 March 2020
Noor Effandi Ahmad	Education; Science and Technology; Green Technology and Innovation	BERSATU	Telok Mas	16 May 2018	9 March 2020
Low Chee Leong	Health	DAP	Kota Laksamana	16 May 2018	9 March 2020
Kerk Chee Yee	Communication and Multimedia; Youth and Sports	DAP	Ayer Keroh	16 May 2018	9 March 2020

=== Idris EXCO (2013–2018) ===
==== Members ====
UMNO (8) MIC (2) MIC (1)

Members from 2013 to 2018 were :

Name	Portfolio	Party	Constituency	Term start	Term end
Idris Haron (Chief Minister)		UMNO	Sungai Udang	14 May 2013	2018
Md Yunos Husin	Education; Higher Education; Science and Technology; Green Technology and Innovation	UMNO	Ayer Molek	14 May 2013	2018
Abdul Ghafar Atan	Public Works; Public Facilities; Transport (2013–2014); Project Rehabilitation (2013–2014)	UMNO	Asahan	14 May 2013	2018
Latiff Tamby Chik	Communication; Unity (2013–2014); Consumer Affairs (2013–2014); Cooperatives	UMNO	Telok Mas	14 May 2013	2018
Ab Rahaman Ab Karim	Health; Sports Development	UMNO	Pantai Kundor	14 May 2013	2018
Latipah Omar	Women Affairs; Family Development; Welfare Affairs	UMNO	Taboh Naning	14 May 2013	2018
Hasan Abd Rahman	Agriculture; Entrepreneur Development	UMNO	Sungai Rambai	14 May 2013	2018
Ismail Othman	Housing; Local Government; Environment	UMNO	Kuala Linggi	14 May 2013	2018
M.S Mahadevan	Company Affairs; Human Resources; Non-Governmental Organizations (NGO)	MIC	Gadek	14 May 2013	2018
Lim Ban Hong	Transport; Project Rehabilitation; International Trade	MCA	Kelebang	2 July 2014	2018
Lai Meng Chong	Unity; Consumer Affairs	MCA	Machap	2 July 2014	2018

==== Deputy Members ====
Name	Portfolio	Party	Constituency	Term start	Term end
Md Rawi Mahmud	Education; Higher Education; Science and Technology; Green Technology and Innovation	UMNO	Tanjung Bidara	2013	2018
Amiruddin Yusop	Cooperation Affairs; Human Resources; Non-governmental Organisations	UMNO	Ayer Limau	2013	2018
Ng Choon Koon	Health; Sports Development	MCA	Bemban	2 July 2014	2018

=== Mohd Ali Rustam III EXCO (2008–2013) ===
UMNO (9) MIC (2) MIC (1)

Members from 2008 to 2013 were :

Name	Portfolio	Party	Constituency	Term start	Term end
Mohd Ali Rustam (Chief Minister)	Lands; Finance; Economic Planning; Green Technology; Science dan Technology; Islamic Religious Affairs (2008–2011)	UMNO	Bukit Baru	2008	2013
Yaakub Md Amin	Education (2008–2011); Science and Technology (2008–2011); Human Resources; Islamic Religious Affairs (2011–2013)	UMNO	Sungai Udang	2008	2013
Mohamad Hidhir Abu Hasan	Rural Development (2008–2011); Agriculture (2008–2011)	UMNO	Merlimau	2008	2011
Ghazale Muhamad	Transport; Information; Unity; Consumerism	UMNO	Serkam	1 April 2011	13 May 2013
Ab Karim Sulaiman	Public Works; Public Facilities	UMNO	Tanjung Bidara	2008	2013
Md Yunos Husin	Housing; Local Government; Environment	UMNO	Ayer Molek	2008	2013
Abdul Ghafar Atan	Housing (2008–2011); Small Town Development (2008–2011); Project Rehabilitation (2008–2011); Industry (2011–2013); Trade (2011–2013); Entrepreneur Development (2011–2013); Cooperatives (2011–2013)	UMNO	Gadek	2008	2013
Norpipah Abdol	Women; Family Development; Welfare	UMNO	Rembia	2008	2013
Latiff Tamby Chik	Tourism; Culture; Heritage	UMNO	Telok Mas	2008	2013
R. Perumal	Transport (2008–2011); Information (2008–2011); Unity (2008–2011); Consumerism (2008–2011); Rural Development (2011–2013); Agriculture (2011–2013)	MIC	Asahan	2008	2013
Gan Tian Loo	Public Works (2008–2011); Public Facilities (2008–2011); Education; Youth; Sports	MCA	Duyong	2008	2013
Seet Har Cheow	Health; Small Town Development (2011–2013); Project Rehabilitation (2011–2013); Non-Governmental Organisation (NGOs)	MCA	Kelebang	2008	2013

=== Mohd Ali Rustam II EXCO (2004–2008) ===
UMNO (2)

Members from 2008 to 2013 were :

Name	Portfolio	Party	Constituency	Term start	Term end
Mohd Ali Rustam (Chief Minister)		UMNO	Bukit Baru	2004	2008
Amid Nordin	Tourism; Culture; Heritage	UMNO	Telok Mas	2004	2 June 2005

=== Mohd Ali Rustam I EXCO (1999–2004) ===
UMNO (7) MCA (2) MIC (1)

Members from 1999 to 2004 were :

Name	Portfolio	Party	Constituency	Term start	Term end
Mohd Ali Rustam (Chief Minister)	Religious Affairs; Land; Finance; Economic Planner	UMNO	Paya Rumput	8 December 1999	2004
Ahmad Hamzah	Industry; Science and Technology	UMNO	Serkam	8 December 1999	2004
Momin Abdul Aziz	Housing; Local Government; Environment	UMNO	Ayer Molek	8 December 1999	2004
Ibrahim Durum	Rural Development; Agriculture	UMNO	Kuala Linggi	8 December 1999	2004
Long Said	Education	UMNO	Ramuan China	8 December 1999	2004
Ramlah Abas	Family Development (1999–2000); Youth and Sports (1999–2000); Family (2000–2004); Community (2000–2004); Social Development (2000–2004)	UMNO	Rim	8 December 1999	2004
Hamdin Abdollah	Tourism; Culture	UMNO	Rembia	8 December 1999	2004
Poh Ah Tiam	Public works; Public Facilities	MCA	Bukit Sedanan	8 December 1999	2004
Seah Kwi Tong	Human Resources; Health; Consumer Affairs	MCA	Ayer Keroh	8 December 1999	2004
Raghavan Raman	Youth and Sports	MIC	Bukit Asahan	18 December 2000	2004

=== Abdul Rahim Thamby Chik I EXCO (1982–1986) ===
UMNO (7) MCA (2)

Members from 1982 to 1986 were :

Name	Portfolio	Party	Constituency	Term start	Term end
Abdul Rahim Thamby Chik (Chief Minister)	Land; Finance; Economic Development	UMNO	Kelemak	1982	1986
Abdul Aziz Tapa	Education; Culture; Youth and Sports	UMNO	Nyalas	1982	1986
Ahmad Nordin Mohd Amin	Public Enterprise	UMNO	Sungei Udang	1982	1986
Tee Cheng Yok	Tourism; Trade and Industry	MCA	Peringgit	1982	1986
Lim Soo Kiang	Health; Human Resources	MCA	Batang Melaka	1982	1986
Mat Aris Konil	Public Works; Public Utilities	UMNO	Ayer Panas	1982	1986
Mohamed Jais	Rural Development	UMNO	Sungei Bahru	1982	1986
Idris Ghani	Public Welfare; Religious Affairs	UMNO	Masjid Tanah	1982	1986
Ahmad Abdullah	Local Government; Housing; Environment	UMNO	Tanjong Minyak	1982	1986

=== Ex officio members ===
Position	Office bearer
State Secretary	Datuk Zaidi Bin Johari
State Legal Advisor	Datuk Abd Aziz bin Engan
State Financial Officer	Datuk Salhah Binti Salleh

== See also ==
- Yang di-Pertua Negeri of Malacca
- Chief Minister of Malacca
- Malacca State Legislative Assembly
