= Hameed Mytheen Kunju Basheer =

Malaysian politician (born 1973)

Yang Berhormat Datuk Hameed Mytheen Kunju Basheer DPSM PPN BKT MLA

Member of the Malacca State Executive Council
- In office 5 April 2023 – 14 November 2026 (Works, Infrastructure, Public Facilities and Transport)
- Governor: Mohd Ali Rustam
- Deputy: Zahari Abd Khalil
- Chief Minister: Ab Rauf Yusoh
- Preceded by: Rahmad Mariman
- Constituency: Ayer Limau

Member of the Malacca State Legislative Assembly for Ayer Limau
- Incumbent
- Assumed office 20 November 2021
- Preceded by: Amiruddin Yusop (BN–UMNO)
- Majority: 1,085 (2021); 8,753 (2026)

Faction represented in Malacca State Legislative Assembly
- 2021–: Barisan Nasional

Personal details
- Born: 8 February 1973 (age 53) Ayer Limau, Malacca, Malaysia
- Party: United Malays National Organisation (UMNO)
- Other political affiliations: Barisan Nasional (BN)
- Occupation: Politician
- Profession: Teacher
- Hameed Mytheen Kunju Basheer on Facebook

Hameed bin Mytheen Kunju Basheer (born 8 February 1973) is a Malaysian politician and teacher who has served as Member of the Malacca State Executive Council (EXCO) in the Barisan Nasional (BN) state administration under Chief Minister Ab Rauf Yusoh since April 2023 and Member of the Malacca State Legislative Assembly (MLA) for Ayer Limau since November 2021. He is a member of the United Malays National Organisation (UMNO), a component party of the BN coalition. He is the Division Vice Chief and Youth Chief of UMNO of Masjid Tanah. He was a physical education teacher at the Alor Gajah Maktab Rendah Sains Mara (MRSM).

== Political career ==
Hameed Mytheen was elected to the Melaka State Legislative Assembly in the 2021 Malacca state election on 20 November 2021, winning the seat of Ayer Limau from Amiruddin Yusop also of the BN coalition who was retiring as an MLA. He was also appointed as Member of the Melaka State EXCO in charge of Works, Infrastructure, Public Facilities and Transport by the 13th Chief Minister Ab Rauf on 5 April 2023.

== Election results ==
Malacca State Legislative Assembly
Year	Constituency	Candidate	Votes	Pct	Opponent(s)	Votes	Pct	Ballots cast	Majority	Turnout
2021	N03 Ayer Limau	Hameed Mytheen Kunju Basheer (UMNO)	3,838	51.94%	Noordina Abd Latif (BERSATU)	2,753	37.25%	7,389	1,085	66.71%
2021	N03 Ayer Limau	Hameed Mytheen Kunju Basheer (UMNO)	3,838	51.94%	Maznah Baharuddin (AMANAH)	798	10.80%	7,389	1,085	66.71%
2026	N03 Ayer Limau	Hameed Mytheen Kunju Basheer (UMNO)	10,116	88.13%	Mohd Jaini Dimon (PKR)	1,363	11.87%	11,479	8,753	75.49%

== Honours ==
- Malaysia
  - Medal of the Order of the Defender of the Realm (PPN) (2015)
- Malacca
  - Lieutenant of the Exalted Order of Malacca (DPSM) – Datuk (2020)
  - Recipient of the Commendable Service Star (BKT) (2014)
