= 2018 Malacca state election =

Malaysian state legislative election

- 9 May 2018

All 28 seats of the Malacca State Legislative Assembly 15 seats needed for a majority
- Registered: 494,662
- Turnout: 84.97%
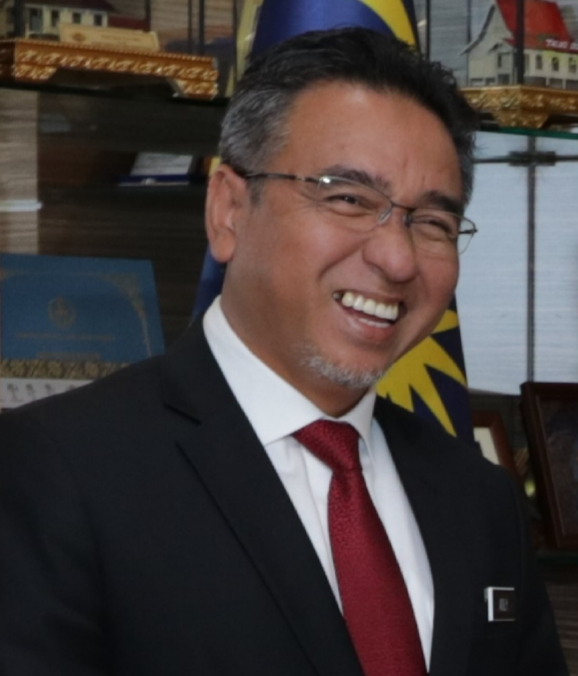

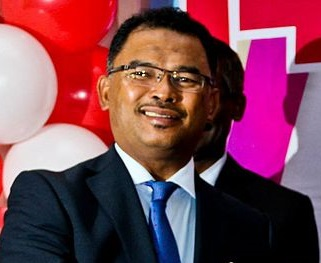
| | Majority party | Minority party | Third party |
|---|---|---|---|
| | | | GS |
| Leader | Adly Zahari | Idris Haron | Kamarudin Sidek |
| Party | AMANAH | UMNO | PAS |
| Alliance | Pakatan Harapan | Barisan Nasional | Gagasan Sejahtera |
| Leader since | 30 August 2017 | 2013 | Unknown |
| Leader's seat | Bukit Katil | Sungai Udang | Duyong (lost seat) |
| Last election | 6 seats, 31.18% (Pakatan Rakyat) | 21 seats, 53.31% | 1 seat, 14.98% (Pakatan Rakyat) |
| Seats before | 3 | 21 | 1 |
| Seats won | 15 | 13 | 0 |
| Seat change | ▲12 | ▼8 | ▼1 |
| Popular vote | 211,153 | 156,318 | 44,537 |
| Percentage | 51.11% | 37.84% | 10.78% |
| Swing | ▲19.93 pp | ▼15.47 pp | ▼4.20% |
Chief Minister before election
Idris Haron
Barisan Nasional
Elected Chief Minister
Adly Zahari
Pakatan Harapan

The 14th Malacca election was held on 9 May 2018 to elect the State Assemblymen of the 14th Malacca State Legislative Assembly, the legislature of the Malaysian state of Malacca. The Malacca State Legislative Assembly dissolved on 7 April 2018 by the Head of State (Yang di-Pertua Negeri of Malacca) on the advice of the Head of Government (Chief Minister of Malacca).

The election was conducted by the Malaysian Election Commission (EC) and used the first-past-the-post system. Electoral candidates were nominated on 28 April. On 9 May, between 8.00 a.m. and 5.00 p.m. Malaysian time (UTC+8), polling was held in all 28 state constituencies throughout Malacca; each constituency elects a single State Assemblyman to the state legislature. The election was held concurrently with the 2018 Malaysian general election.

In a historic result, Barisan Nasional (BN), the ruling coalition in Malacca, was ousted from power by Pakatan Harapan (PH). Since the first Malacca state election in 1955, BN or its predecessor Alliance had never lost the state election. PH won 15 seats in the election, gaining a simple majority, while BN won 13. Adly Zahari from PH's component party AMANAH was sworn in as new Chief Minister on 11 May 2018.

== Background ==
The upcoming state election will be the 14th state election in the State of Malacca since the independence of Malaya (now Malaysia) in 1957.

A state election must be held within sixty days after the dissolution. Accordingly, the Election Commission set 28 April as the nomination day and 9 May as the polling day.

=== Political parties ===
Barisan Nasional (BN), the ruling coalition in Malacca, has been in power since its formation and led by Chief Minister Idris Haron.

BN was challenged by two opposition coalitions, the Pakatan Harapan (PH) and the Gagasan Sejahtera (GS). The PH and GS coalitions were led by Adly Zahari and Kamarudin Sidek respectively.

Coalition
| Incumbent | Opposition | |
|---|---|---|
| Barisan Nasional (BN) | Pakatan Harapan (PH) | Gagasan Sejahtera (GS) |
| United Malays National Organisation (UMNO); Malaysian Chinese Association (MCA); Malaysian Indian Congress (MIC); Parti Gerakan Rakyat Malaysia (Gerakan) | National Trust Party (Amanah); People's Justice Party (PKR); Malaysian United Indigenous Party (Bersatu); Democratic Action Party (DAP) | Malaysian Islamic Party (PAS) |

== Electoral candidates ==
| No. | Parliamentary Constituency | No. | State constituency | Incumbent State Assemblyman | Political parties | | | | | | | |
| No. | Parliamentary Constituency | No. | State constituency | Incumbent State Assemblyman | Barisan Nasional | | Pakatan Harapan | | Gagasan Sejahtera | | Other parties/Ind | |
|---|---|---|---|---|---|---|---|---|---|---|---|---|
| No. | Parliamentary Constituency | No. | State constituency | Incumbent State Assemblyman | Candidate Name | Party | Candidate Name | Party | Candidate Name | Party | Candidate Name | Party |
| P134 | Masjid Tanah | N01 | Kuala Linggi | Ismail Othman (BN) | Ismail Othman | UMNO | Hasmorni Tamby | PKR | Azmi Sambul | PAS | None | |
| P134 | Masjid Tanah | N02 | Tanjung Bidara | Md Rawi Mahmud (BN) | Md Rawi Mahmud | UMNO | Halim Bachik | PKR | Imran Abdul Rahman | PAS | None | |
| P134 | Masjid Tanah | N03 | Ayer Limau | Amiruddin Yusop (BN) | Amiruddin Yusop | UMNO | Ruslin Hasan | BERSATU | Jamarudin Ahmad | PAS | None | |
| P134 | Masjid Tanah | N04 | Lendu | Sulaiman Md Ali (BN) | Sulaiman Md Ali | UMNO | Riduan Affandi Abu Bakar | BERSATU | Arshad Mohamad Som | PAS | None | |
| P134 | Masjid Tanah | N05 | Taboh Naning | Latipah Omar (BN) | Latipah Omar | UMNO | Zairi Suboh | AMANAH | Asri Shaik Abdul Aziz | PAS | None | |
| P135 | Alor Gajah | N06 | Rembia | Norpipah Abdol (BN) | Norpipah Abdol | UMNO | Muhammad Jailani Khamis | PKR | Mohammad Rashidi Abd Radzak | PAS | None | |
| P135 | Alor Gajah | N07 | Gadek | M.S Mahadevan Sanacy (BN) | P. Panirchelvam | MIC | Saminathan Ganesan | DAP | Emransyah Ismail | PAS | None | |
| P135 | Alor Gajah | N08 | Machap Jaya (previously Machap) | Lai Meng Chong (BN) | Koh Nai Kwong | MCA | Ginie Lim Siew Lin | PKR | Wan Zahidi Wan Ismail | PAS | None | |
| P135 | Alor Gajah | N09 | Durian Tunggal | Ab Wahab Ab Latip (BN) | Ab Wahab Ab Latip | UMNO | Mohd Sofi Abdul Wahab | AMANAH | Mohsin Ibrahim | PAS | None | |
| P135 | Alor Gajah | N10 | Asahan | Abdul Ghafar Atan (BN) | Abdul Ghafar Atan | UMNO | Zamzuri Ariffin | BERSATU | Azlan Maddin | PAS | None | |
| P136 | Tangga Batu | N11 | Sungai Udang | Idris Haron (BN) | Idris Haron | UMNO | Mohd Lokman Abdul Gani | PKR | None | | None | |
| P136 | Tangga Batu | N12 | Pantai Kundor | Ab Rahaman Ab Karim (BN) | Nor Azman Hassan | UMNO | Juhari Osman | AMANAH | Abdul Halim Maidin | PAS | None | |
| P136 | Tangga Batu | N13 | Paya Rumput | Sazali Muhd Din (BN) | Abu Bakar Mohamad Diah | UMNO | Md Rafiq Naizamohideen | BERSATU | Rafie Ahmad | PAS | None | |
| P136 | Tangga Batu | N14 | Kelebang | Lim Ban Hong (BN) | Lim Ban Hong | MCA | Gue Teck | PKR | Mohd Shafiq Ismail | PAS | None | |
| P137 | Hang Tuah Jaya | N15 | Pengkalan Batu (previously Bachang) | Lim Jack Wong (IND) | Chua Lian Chye | GERAKAN | Norhizam Hassan Baktee | DAP | Ramli Dalip | PAS | None | |
| P137 | Hang Tuah Jaya | N16 | Ayer Keroh | Khoo Poay Tiong (PH) | Chua Kheng Hwa | MCA | Kerk Chee Yee | DAP | Sepri Rahman | PAS | None | |
| P137 | Hang Tuah Jaya | N17 | Bukit Katil (previously Bukit Baru) | Md Khalid Kassim (GS) | Yunus Hitam | UMNO | Adli Zahari | AMANAH | Muhamat Puhat Bedol | PAS | None | |
| P137 | Hang Tuah Jaya | N18 | Ayer Molek | Md. Yunos Husin (BN) | Rahmad Mariman | UMNO | Farhan Ibrahim | PKR | Jantan Abdullah | PAS | Kamarolzaman Jidi | IND |
| P138 | Kota Melaka | N19 | Kesidang | Chin Choong Seong (IND) | Ng Choon Koon | MCA | Seah Shoo Chin | DAP | None | | Goh Leong San¹ | IND |
| P138 | Kota Melaka | N20 | Kota Laksamana | Lai Keun Ban (PH) | Melvia Chua Kew Wei | MCA | Low Chee Leong | DAP | None | | Sim Tong Him¹ | IND |
| P138 | Kota Melaka | N21 | Duyong | Goh Leong San (IND) | Lee Kiat Lee | MCA | Damian Yeo Shen Li | DAP | Kamarudin Sedik | PAS | Lim Jack Wong¹ | IND |
| P138 | Kota Melaka | N22 | Bandar Hilir | Tey Kok Kiew (PH) | Shaun Lee Chong Leng | MCA | Tey Kok Kiew | DAP | None | | Chin Choong Seong¹ | IND |
| P138 | Kota Melaka | N23 | Telok Mas | Latiff Tamby Chik (BN) | Abdul Razak Abdul Rahman | UMNO | Noor Effandi Ahmad | BERSATU | Rosazli Md Yasin | PAS | None | |
| P139 | Jasin | N24 | Bemban | Ng Choon Koon (BN) | Koh Chin Han | MCA | Wong Fort Pin | DAP | Suhaimi Harun | PAS | None | |
| P139 | Jasin | N25 | Rim | Ghazale Muhamad (BN) | Ghazale Muhamad | UMNO | Shamsul Iskandar Md. Akin | PKR | Kintan Man | PAS | None | |
| P139 | Jasin | N26 | Serkam | Zaidi Attan (BN) | Zaidi Attan | UMNO | Nor Khairi Yusof | AMANAH | Ahmad Bilal Rahudin | PAS | None | |
| P139 | Jasin | N27 | Merlimau | Roslan Ahmad (BN) | Roslan Ahmad | UMNO | Yuhaizad Abdullah | AMANAH | Abd Malek Yusof | PAS | None | |
| P139 | Jasin | N28 | Sungai Rambai | Hasan Abd Rahman (BN) | Hasan Abd Rahman | UMNO | Azalina Abdul Rahman | BERSATU | Zakariya Kasnin | PAS | None | |

Note: ^{1}Four Independent candidates who had quit DAP Malacca to form 'Justice League' informal Independent bloc and contested using the key symbol.

== Election pendulum ==
The 14th General Election witnessed 15 governmental seats and 13 non-governmental seats filled the Malacca State Legislative Assembly. The government side has 4 safe seats and 1 fairly safe seat, while the non-government side has just 2 fairly safe seats.

2018 Malacca state election

GOVERNMENT SEATS
Marginal
| Gadek | Saminathan Ganesan | DAP | 42.47 |
| Telok Mas | Noor Effandi Ahmad | BERSATU | 44.57 |
| Bemban | Dr. Wong Fort Pin | DAP | 45.40 |
| Kelebang | Gue Teck | PKR | 45.58 |
| Durian Tunggal | Mohd. Sofi Abdul Wahab | AMANAH | 47.16 |
| Duyong | Damian Yeo Shen Li | DAP | 49.66 |
| Pengkalan Batu | Norhizam Hassan Baktee | DAP | 51.47 |
| Bukit Katil | Adly Zahari | AMANAH | 52.14 |
| Rembia | Muhammad Jailani Khamis | PKR | 52.37 |
| Machap Jaya | Ginie Lim Siew Lin | PKR | 52.66 |
Fairly safe
| Paya Rumput | Mohd. Rafiq Naizamohideen | BERSATU | 56.30 |
Safe
| Ayer Keroh | Kerk Chee Yee | DAP | 65.31 |
| Kesidang | Seah Shoo Chin | DAP | 72.64 |
| Kota Laksamana | Low Chee Leong | DAP | 81.68 |
| Bandar Hilir | Tey Kok Kiew | DAP | 83.05 |

NON-GOVERNMENT SEATS
Marginal
| Merlimau | Roslan Ahmad | UMNO | 45.38 |
| Pantai Kundor | Nor Azman Hassan | UMNO | 45.42 |
| Ayer Molek | Rahmad Mariman | UMNO | 45.56 |
| Asahan | Abdul Ghafar Atan | UMNO | 45.80 |
| Rim | Ghazale Muhamad | UMNO | 46.80 |
| Lendu | Sulaiman Md. Ali | UMNO | 46.87 |
| Taboh Naning | Latipah Omar | UMNO | 47.36 |
| Serkam | Zaidi Attan | UMNO | 47.46 |
| Sungai Rambai | Hasan Abd. Rahman | UMNO | 51.33 |
| Ayer Limau | Amiruddin Yusop | UMNO | 51.60 |
| Kuala Linggi | Ismail Othman | UMNO | 52.34 |
Fairly safe
| Sungai Udang | Ir. Idris Haron | UMNO | 56.22 |
| Tanjung Bidara | Md. Rawi Mahmud | UMNO | 58.15 |

== Results ==
| Party or alliance | | Votes | % | Seats | +/– |
|---|---|---|---|---|---|
| Pakatan Harapan | Democratic Action Party | 99,637 | 24.12 | 8 | +2 |
| Pakatan Harapan | People's Justice Party | 50,220 | 12.16 | 3 | +3 |
| Pakatan Harapan | Malaysian United Indigenous Party | 32,107 | 7.77 | 2 | New |
| Pakatan Harapan | National Trust Party | 29,189 | 7.06 | 2 | New |
| Pakatan Harapan | Total | 211,153 | 51.11 | 15 | +9 |
| Barisan Nasional | United Malays National Organisation | 104,270 | 25.24 | 13 | –4 |
| Barisan Nasional | Malaysian Chinese Association | 41,492 | 10.04 | 0 | –3 |
| Barisan Nasional | Parti Gerakan Rakyat Malaysia | 6,471 | 1.57 | 0 | 0 |
| Barisan Nasional | Malaysian Indian Congress | 4,085 | 0.99 | 0 | –1 |
| Barisan Nasional | Total | 156,318 | 37.84 | 13 | –8 |
| Gagasan Sejahtera | Pan-Malaysian Islamic Party | 44,537 | 10.78 | 0 | –1 |
| Independents | | 1,148 | 0.28 | 0 | 0 |
| Total | | 413,156 | 100.00 | 28 | 0 |
| Valid votes | | 413,156 | 98.30 | | |
| Invalid/blank votes | | 7,143 | 1.70 | | |
| Total votes | | 420,299 | 100.00 | | |
| Registered voters/turnout | | 494,662 | 84.97 | | |
Source: ElectionData.MY

=== By parliamentary constituency ===
Pakatan Harapan won 4 of 6 parliamentary constituency.

| No. | Constituency | Barisan Nasional | Gagasan Sejahtera | Pakatan Harapan | Member of Parliament |
|---|---|---|---|---|---|
| P134 | Masjid Tanah | 54.75% | 14.88% | 30.37% | Mas Ermieyati Samsudin |
| P135 | Alor Gajah | 40.91% | 11.41% | 47.68% | |
| P135 | Alor Gajah | 40.91% | 11.41% | 47.68% | Koh Nai Kwong (13th Parliament) |
| P135 | Alor Gajah | 40.91% | 11.41% | 47.68% | Mohd Redzuan Md Yusof (14th Parliament) |
| P136 | Tangga Batu | 44.33% | 8.36% | 47.31% | Abu Bakar Mohamad Diah (13th Parliament) |
| P136 | Tangga Batu | 44.33% | 8.36% | 47.31% | Rusnah Aluai (14th Parliament) |
| P137 | Hang Tuah Jaya | 34.61% | 13.21% | 52.08% | Shamsul Iskandar Md. Akin |
| P138 | Kota Melaka | 24.75% | 5.77% | 68.47% | Sim Tong Him (13th Parliament) |
| P138 | Kota Melaka | 24.75% | 5.77% | 68.47% | Khoo Poay Tiong (14th Parliament) |
| P139 | Jasin | 44.88% | 16.28% | 38.84% | Ahmad Hamzah |

=== Seats that changed allegiance ===
| No. | Seat | Previous Party (2013) | Current Party (2018) |
|---|---|---|---|
| N06 | (Malacca) Rembia | Barisan Nasional (UMNO) | Pakatan Harapan (PKR) |
| N07 | (Malacca) Gadek | Barisan Nasional (MIC) | Pakatan Harapan (DAP) |
| N08 | (Malacca) Machap Jaya | Barisan Nasional (MCA) | Pakatan Harapan (PKR) |
| N09 | (Malacca) Durian Tunggal | Barisan Nasional (UMNO) | Pakatan Harapan (AMANAH) |
| N13 | (Malacca) Paya Rumput | Barisan Nasional (UMNO) | Pakatan Harapan (BERSATU) |
| N14 | (Malacca) Kelebang | Barisan Nasional (MCA) | Pakatan Harapan (PKR) |
| N17 | (Malacca) Bukit Katil | Gagasan Sejahtera (PAS) | Pakatan Harapan (AMANAH) |
| N23 | (Malacca) Telok Mas | Barisan Nasional (UMNO) | Pakatan Harapan (BERSATU) |
| N24 | (Malacca) Bemban | Barisan Nasional (MCA) | Pakatan Harapan (DAP) |

== Aftermath ==
The state government led by Adly only lasts 22 months, when in the wake of 2020 Malaysian political crisis and defection of several MLA resulted in his resignation and a new state government under BN's Sulaiman Md Ali in March 2020. That government, in turn only lasted another 19 months before another constitutional crisis resulted in a snap election called by Sulaiman in October 2021.
