= Saminathan Ganesan =

Malaysian politician

- சமினாதன் கணேசன்

Member of the Malacca State Executive Council
- In office 16 May 2018 – 2 March 2020 (Unity, Human Resources, Non-governmental Organisations & Consumer Affairs)
- Governor: Mohd Khalil Yaakob
- Chief Minister: Adly Zahari
- Preceded by: Lai Meng Chong (Unity & Consumer Affairs); MS Mahadevan Sanacy (Human Resources & Non-governmental Organisations)
- Succeeded by: Ismail Othman (Unity, Human Resources & Consumer Affairs); Mohd Rafiq Naizamohideen (Non-Governmental Organisations)
- Constituency: Gadek

Member of the Malacca State Legislative Assembly for Gadek
- In office 9 May 2018 – 20 November 2021
- Preceded by: MS Mahadevan Sanacy (BN–MIC)
- Succeeded by: Shanmugam Ptcyhay (BN–MIC)
- Majority: 307 (2018)

Personal details
- Born: Saminathan a/l Ganesan; 17 October 1985 (age 40) Malacca, Malaysia
- Citizenship: Malaysian
- Party: Democratic Action Party (DAP)
- Other political affiliations: Pakatan Harapan (PH)
- Occupation: Politician

Saminathan a/l Ganesan (born 17 October 1985) is a Malaysian politician who served as Member of the Malacca State Executive Council (EXCO) in the Pakatan Harapan (PH) state administration under former Chief Minister Adly Zahari from May 2018 to the collapse of the PH state administration in March 2020 and Member of the Malacca State Legislative Assembly (MLA) for Gadek from May 2018 to November 2021. He is a member of the Democratic Action Party (DAP), a component party of the PH coalition.

== Election results ==
Malacca State Legislative Assembly
Year	Constituency	Candidate	Votes	Pct	Opponent(s)	Votes	Pct	Ballots cast	Majority	Turnout
2018	N07 Gadek	Saminathan Ganesan (DAP)	4,392	42.47%	Panirchelvam Pichamuthu (MIC)	4,085	39.50%	10,578	307	81.90%
2018	N07 Gadek	Saminathan Ganesan (DAP)	4,392	42.47%	Emransyah Ismail (PAS)	1,865	18.03%	10,578	307	81.90%
2021	N07 Gadek	Saminathan Ganesan (DAP)	2,463	32.08%	Shanmugam Ptcyhay (MIC)	3,022	39.36%	7,677	559	60.73%
2021	N07 Gadek	Saminathan Ganesan (DAP)	2,463	32.08%	Mohd Amir Fitri Muharram (BERSATU)	2,041	26.59%	7,677	559	60.73%
2021	N07 Gadek	Saminathan Ganesan (DAP)	2,463	32.08%	Laila Norinda Maun (PUTRA)	68	0.89%	7,677	559	60.73%
2021	N07 Gadek	Saminathan Ganesan (DAP)	2,463	32.08%	Azafen Amin (IND)	60	0.78%	7,677	559	60.73%
2021	N07 Gadek	Saminathan Ganesan (DAP)	2,463	32.08%	Mohan Singh Booda Singh (IND)	23	0.30%	7,677	559	60.73%
