= Mohd Rafiq Naizamohideen =

Malaysian politician

Yang Berbahagia Datuk Wira Mohd Rafiq Naizamohideen DCSM DMSM PBM
- محمد رفيق بن نظام موحي الدين

Member of the Malacca State Executive Council
- In office 13 March 2020 – 21 November 2021
- Governor: Mohd Khalil Yaakob (March–June 2020); Mohd Ali Rustam (2020–2021)
- Chief Minister: Sulaiman Md Ali
- Portfolio: Non-governmental Organisations, Youth and Sports
- Preceded by: Saminathan Ganesan (Non-governmental Organisations); Kerk Chee Yee (Youth and Sports)
- Succeeded by: Shanmugam Ptcyhay
- Constituency: Paya Rumput
- In office 16 May 2018 – 9 March 2020
- Governor: Mohd Khalil Yaakob
- Chief Minister: Adly Zahari
- Portfolio: Industry, Trade and Investment
- Preceded by: Idris Haron
- Succeeded by: Sulaiman Md Ali
- Constituency: Paya Rumput

Vice President of the Malaysian United Indigenous Party
- In office 23 August 2020 – 30 October 2022 Serving with Radzi Jidin & Ronald Kiandee
- President: Muhyiddin Yassin
- Succeeded by: Ahmad Faizal Azumu

Member of the Malacca State Legislative Assembly for Paya Rumput
- In office 9 May 2018 – 20 November 2021
- Preceded by: Sazali Muhamad Din (BN–UMNO)
- Succeeded by: Rais Yasin (BN–UMNO)
- Majority: 4,259 (2018)

Faction represented in Malacca State Legislative Assembly
- 2018–2020: Pakatan Harapan
- 2020: Malaysian United Indigenous Party
- 2020–2021: Perikatan Nasional

Personal details
- Born: Mohd Rafiq bin Naizamohideen; 15 March 1986 (age 40) Malacca, Malaysia
- Citizenship: Malaysian
- Party: United Malays National Organisation (UMNO) (–2016, since 2023); Malaysian United Indigenous Party (BERSATU) (2016–2022); Independent (2022–2023)
- Other political affiliations: Barisan Nasional (BN) (–2016, since 2023); Pakatan Harapan (PH) (2017–2020); Perikatan Nasional (PN) (2020–2022)
- Occupation: Politician

Mohd Rafiq bin Naizamohideen (born 15 March 1986) is a Malaysian politician who served as Member of the Malacca State Executive Council (EXCO) for the second term in the Barisan Nasional (BN) state administration under former Chief Minister Sulaiman Md Ali from March 2020 to November 2021 and for the first term in the Pakatan Harapan (PH) state administration under former Chief Minister Adly Zahari from May 2018 to the collapse of the PH state administration in March 2020 as well as Member of the Malacca State Legislative Assembly (MLA) for Paya Rumput from May 2018 to November 2021. He is also a member of the United Malays National Organisation (UMNO), a component party of the BN coalition. He was a member of the Malaysian United Indigenous Party (BERSATU), a component party of the Perikatan Nasional (PN) coalition and previously PH coalition. He served as the Vice President of BERSATU from August 2020 to his resignation in October 2022, State Chairman of PN and BERSATU of Malacca from January 2021 to his resignations in November 2021.

On 30 October 2022, Rafiq resigned from the BERSATU party positions and left the party over his disappointment of the seat distribution of BERSATU for the 2022 general election. On 16 February 2023, Rafiq rejoined UMNO after leaving it for BERSATU seven years ago.

== Election results ==
Malacca State Legislative Assembly
Year	Constituency	Candidate	Votes	Pct	Opponent(s)	Votes	Pct	Ballots cast	Majority	Turnout
2018	N13 Paya Rumput	Mohd Rafiq Naizamohideen (BERSATU)	12,102	56.30%	Abu Bakar Mohamad Diah (UMNO)	7,843	36.48%	21,782	4,259	87.00%
2018	N13 Paya Rumput	Mohd Rafiq Naizamohideen (BERSATU)	12,102	56.30%	Rafie Ahmad (PAS)	1,552	7.22%	21,782	4,259	87.00%
2021	N23 Telok Mas	Mohd Rafiq Naizamohideen (BERSATU)	3,976	28.25%	Abdul Razak Abdul Rahman (UMNO)	6,052	43.01%	14,072	2,076	67.94%
2021	N23 Telok Mas	Mohd Rafiq Naizamohideen (BERSATU)	3,976	28.25%	Asyraf Mukhlis Minghat (AMANAH)	3,891	27.65%	14,072	2,076	67.94%
2021	N23 Telok Mas	Mohd Rafiq Naizamohideen (BERSATU)	3,976	28.25%	Muhammad Ariff Adly Mohammad (IND)	153	1.09%	14,072	2,076	67.94%

== Honours ==
- Malacca
  - Knight Commander of the Exalted Order of Malacca (DCSM) – Datuk Wira (2021)
  - Companion Class I of the Exalted Order of Malacca (DMSM) – Datuk (2018)
  - Recipient of the Government Service Medal (PBM) (2011)
