= Noor Effandi Ahmad =

Malaysian politician

Yang Berbahagia Datuk Noor Effandi Ahmad DMSM
- نور افندي أحمد

Member of the Malacca State Executive Council
- In office 2020–2021
- Governor: Mohd Khalil Yaakob (2020); Mohd Ali Rustam (2020–2021)
- Chief Minister: Sulaiman Md Ali
- Portfolio: Education, Higher Education, Technical, Vocational, Science and Innovation
- Preceded by: Himself (Education, Science and Innovation); Portfolio established (Higher Education, Technical, Vocational)
- Succeeded by: Rais Yasin (Education & Science, Technology and Innovation); Portfolio established (Higher Education, Technical, Vocational)
- Constituency: Telok Mas
- In office 2018–2020
- Governor: Mohd Khalil Yaakob
- Chief Minister: Adly Zahari
- Portfolio: Education, Green Technology, Science, Technology and Innovation
- Preceded by: Md Yunos Husin (Education, Green Technology & Science, Technology and Innovation)
- Succeeded by: Himeself (Education, Science and Innovation); Portfolio established (Technology)
- Constituency: Telok Mas

Member of the Malacca State Legislative Assembly for Telok Mas
- In office 9 May 2018 – 20 November 2021
- Preceded by: Datuk Seri Latiff Tamby Chik (BN–UMNO)
- Succeeded by: Abdul Razak Abdul Rahman (BN–UMNO)
- Majority: 1,288 (2018)

Faction represented in Malacca State Legislative Assembly
- 2018–2020: Pakatan Harapan
- 2020–2021: Perikatan Nasional

Personal details
- Born: 8 October 1982 (age 43) Segamat, Johor, Malaysia
- Citizenship: Malaysian
- Party: Malaysian United Indigenous Party (BERSATU) (2016–2021, 2024-Now); Independent (2021–2022); National Trust Party (AMANAH) (2022-2024)
- Other political affiliations: Pakatan Harapan (PH) (2017-2020, 2022-2024) Perikatan Nasional (PN) (2020-2021, 2024-Now)
- Education: Multimedia University (Bachelor's Degree (Hons) Banking and Finance) (2004); Universiti Utara Malaysia (MBA) (2007)
- Occupation: Politician
- Profession: Lecturer (2004–2018)
- Noor Effandi Ahmad on Facebook

Noor Effandi bin Ahmad is a Malaysian politician who served as Member of the Malacca State Legislative Assembly (MLA) for Telok Mas from May 2018 to November 2021 and Member of the Malacca State Executive Council (EXCO) from May 2018 to March 2020 for the first time and again from March 2020 to his resignation in October 2021.

He is a member of the Malaysian United Indigenous Party (BERSATU), a component party of the Perikatan Nasional (PN) coalition and previously Pakatan Harapan (PH) coalition. During his tenure, he served two times as member of EXCO, from May 2018 to March 2020 for the first time under PH and again from March 2020 to October 2021 for the second time under BN-PN administrations.

On 5 October 2021, BERSATU membership of Noor Effandi was automatically dropped for blatantly stating his loss of support for the BN state government under Chief Minister Sulaiman Md Ali. He and three other MLAs also withdrew support for the Malacca state government, triggering the state assembly dissolution and subsequent snap 2021 Malacca state election. His attempt to return to PH and contest in the state election under its banner was rejected by the coalition, he decided not to defend the seat and remain as an Independent after his twice defections. On 19 May 2022, he joins Amanah. He left Amanah in 2024.

BERSATU reinstated his membership in early 2024.

== Election results ==
Malacca State Legislative Assembly
| Year | Constituency | Candidate | Votes | Pct | Opponent(s) | Votes | Pct | Ballots cast | Majority | Turnout |
|---|---|---|---|---|---|---|---|---|---|---|
| 2018 | N23 Telok Mas | Noor Effandi Ahmad (BERSATU) | 7,694 | 44.56% | Abdul Razak Abdul Rahman (UMNO) | 6,406 | 37.11% | 17,500 | 1,288 | 85.60% |
| 2018 | N23 Telok Mas | Noor Effandi Ahmad (BERSATU) | 7,694 | 44.56% | Rosazli Md Yasin (PAS) | 3,164 | 18.33% | 17,500 | 1,288 | 85.60% |

== Honours ==
=== Honours of Malaysia ===
- Malacca
  - Companion Class I of the Exalted Order of Malacca (DMSM) – Datuk (2019)
