= Mohd Sofi Abdul Wahab =

Malaysian politician

Yang Berbahagia Datuk Mohd Sofi Abdul Wahab DMSM
- محمد صوفي بن عبدالوهاب

Member of the Malacca State Executive Council
- In office 16 May 2018 – 9 March 2020 (Public Works, Transportation and Public Amenities)
- Governor: Mohd Khalil Yaakob
- Chief Minister: Adly Zahari
- Preceded by: Abdul Ghafar Atan (Public Works and Public Facilities)
- Succeeded by: Roslan Ahmad (Public Works, Transport and Public Facilities)
- Constituency: Durian Tunggal

Faction represented in Malacca State Legislative Assembly
- 2018–2021: Pakatan Harapan

Personal details
- Born: 12 October 1968 (age 57) Kuala Lipis, Pahang, Malaysia
- Citizenship: Malaysian
- Party: National Trust Party (AMANAH)
- Other political affiliations: Pakatan Harapan (PH)
- Occupation: Politician

Mohd Sofi bin Abdul Wahab is a Malaysian politician and served as Malacca State Executive Councillor.

== Election results ==
Malacca State Legislative Assembly
Year	Constituency	Candidate	Votes	Pct	Opponent(s)	Votes	Pct	Ballots cast	Majority	Turnout%
2018	N09 Durian Tunggal	Mohd Sofi Abdul Wahab (AMANAH)	5,213	47.16%	Ab Wahab Ab Latip (UMNO)	4,450	40.26%	11,289	763	86.30%
2018	N09 Durian Tunggal	Mohd Sofi Abdul Wahab (AMANAH)	5,213	47.16%	Mohsin Ibrahim (PAS)	1,391	12.58%	11,289	763	86.30%
2021	N09 Durian Tunggal	Mohd Sofi Abdul Wahab (AMANAH)	3,104	34.36%	Zahari Abd Khalil (UMNO)	3,663	40.55%	9,267	559	69.61%
2021	N09 Durian Tunggal	Mohd Sofi Abdul Wahab (AMANAH)	3,104	34.36%	Ja'afar Othman (PAS)	2,208	24.44%	9,267	559	69.61%
2021	N09 Durian Tunggal	Mohd Sofi Abdul Wahab (AMANAH)	3,104	34.36%	Mohd Erfan Mahrilar (IND)	58	0.64%	9,267	559	69.61%

== Honours ==
- Malacca
  - Companion Class I of the Exalted Order of Malacca (DMSM) – Datuk (2018)
