= Shanmugam Ptcyhay =

Malaysian politician (born 1969)

Yang Berbahagia Datuk Shanmugam Pitchay DMSM AMN PPN BKT PJK
- சண்முகம் பிச்சை

Member of the Malacca State Executive Council
- Incumbent
- Assumed office 5 April 2023 (Non-governmental Organisations, Youth and Sports)
- Governor: Mohd Ali Rustam
- Chief Minister: Ab Rauf Yusoh
- Preceded by: Himself
- Constituency: Gadek
- In office 26 November 2021 – 31 March 2023
- Governor: Mohd Ali Rustam
- Chief Minister: Sulaiman Md Ali
- Preceded by: Mohd Rafiq Naizamohideen
- Succeeded by: Himself
- Constituency: Gadek

Member of the Malacca State Legislative Assembly for Gadek
- In office 20 November 2021 – 14 November 2026
- Preceded by: Saminathan Ganesan (PH–DAP)
- Majority: 559 (2021)

Faction represented in Malacca State Legislative Assembly
- 2021–: Barisan Nasional

Personal details
- Born: Shanmugam s/o V. Pitchay; 30 March 1969 (age 57) Malacca, Malaysia
- Party: Malaysian Indian Congress (MIC)
- Other political affiliations: Barisan Nasional (BN)
- Occupation: Politician
- Shanmugam Ptcyhay on Facebook

Shanmugam s/o V. Pitchay (or formally known as V. P. Shanmugam, born 30 March 1969) is a Malaysian politician who has served as Member of the Malacca State Executive Council (EXCO) in the Barisan Nasional (BN) state administration under Chief Minister Ab Rauf Yusoh since April 2023 for the second term and under former Chief Minister Sulaiman Md Ali from November 2021 to March 2023 for the first term as well as Member of the Malacca State Legislative Assembly (MLA) for Gadek since November 2021. He is a member of the Malaysian Indian Congress (MIC), a component party of the BN coalition. He is also the sole Malacca EXCO member, MLA of Indian descent and from MIC, the sole MIC candidate nominated and subsequently won in the 2021 Malacca state election and the sole EXCO Member serving without a deputy.

== Election results ==
Malacca State Legislative Assembly
Year	Constituency	Candidate	Votes	Pct	Opponent(s)	Votes	Pct	Ballots cast	Majority	Turnout
2021	N07 Gadek	Shanmugam Pitchay (MIC)	3,022	39.36%	Saminathan Ganesan (DAP)	2,463	32.08%	7,677	559	60.73%
2021	N07 Gadek	Shanmugam Pitchay (MIC)	3,022	39.36%	Mohd. Amir Fitri Muharram (BERSATU)	2,041	26.59%	7,677	559	60.73%
2021	N07 Gadek	Shanmugam Pitchay (MIC)	3,022	39.36%	Laila Norinda Maun (PUTRA)	68	0.89%	7,677	559	60.73%
2021	N07 Gadek	Shanmugam Pitchay (MIC)	3,022	39.36%	Azafen Amin (IND)	60	0.78%	7,677	559	60.73%
2021	N07 Gadek	Shanmugam Pitchay (MIC)	3,022	39.36%	Mohan Singh Booda Singh (IND)	23	0.30%	7,677	559	60.73%

== Honours ==
- Malaysia
  - Member of the Order of the Defender of the Realm (AMN) (2004)
  - Medal of the Order of the Defender of the Realm (PPN) (1999)
- Malacca
  - Companion of the Exalted Order of Malacca (DMSM) – Datuk (2024)
  - Recipient of the Commendable Service Star (BKT) (2009)
  - Recipient of the Meritorious Service Medal (PJK) (2006)
