= Wong Fort Pin =

Malaysian politician and medical doctor

Yang Berbahagia Datuk Dr. Wong Fort Pin DMSM
- 黄和平

Deputy Speaker of the Malacca State Legislative Assembly
- In office 19 July 2018 – 11 May 2020
- Governor: Mohd Khalil Yaakob
- Chief Minister: Adly Zahari (2018–2020); Sulaiman Md Ali (March–May 2020)
- Speaker: Omar Jaafar
- Preceded by: Ab Wahab Ab Latip
- Succeeded by: Ghazale Muhamad
- Constituency: Bemban

Member of the Malacca State Legislative Assembly for Bemban
- In office 9 May 2018 – 20 November 2021
- Preceded by: Ng Choon Koon (BN–MCA)
- Succeeded by: Mohd Yadzil Yaakub (PN–BERSATU)
- Majority: 1,345 (2018)

Personal details
- Born: Wong Fort Pin; 15 June 1955 (age 70) Malacca, Federation of Malaya (now Malaysia)
- Citizenship: Malaysian
- Party: Democratic Action Party (DAP)
- Other political affiliations: Pakatan Harapan (PH)
- Occupation: Politician
- Profession: Medical doctor
- Website: drwong333.blogspot.com
- Wong Fort Pin on Facebook

Wong Fort Pin

Chinese name
- Traditional Chinese: 黃和平
- Simplified Chinese: 黄和平
Transcriptions
Standard Mandarin
- Hanyu Pinyin: Huáng Hépíng
Hakka
- Pha̍k-fa-sṳ: Vòng Fò-phìn
Yue: Cantonese
- Jyutping: Wong4 Wo4 Ping4
Southern Min
- Hokkien POJ: N̂g Hô-pêng
- Tâi-lô: N̂g Hô-pîng

Wong Fort Pin (Chinese: 黃和平; Jyutping: Wong4 Wo4 Ping4; Pe̍h-ōe-jī: N̂g Hô-pêng; Pha̍k-fa-sṳ: Vòng Fò-phìn; born 15 June 1955) is a Malaysian politician and medical doctor who served as Deputy Speaker of the Melaka State Legislative Assembly from July 2018 to May 2020 and Member of the Melaka Legislative Assembly (MLA) for Bemban from May 2018 to November 2021. He is a member of the Democratic Action Party (DAP), a component party of the Pakatan Harapan (PH) coalition.

== Background ==
Wong grew up in Nyalas and Bukit Baru, Malacca. He studied in Ping Ming Primary Chinese School, St. David's High School, High School Malacca, and Kaohsiung Medical College, Taiwan. He obtained DRM, Diploma in Reproductive Medicine from Academy of Family Physicians of Malaysia. Active in athletic events, a scout and a prefect in school.

He have his own Medical GP clinic in Bukit Baru. Begun to get involve in Addiction Medicine since 2004.

== Politics ==
On 17 September 2015, Wong who is a doctor and also the Bukit Palah DAP branch chairman then, successfully sued fellow DAP state leaders in conflict, Sim Tong Him and Goh Leong San for defamation because of libelous media statements they have issued which implicate him in outraging the modesty of his patients and also accused his sibling of being involved in illegal activities. He won RM300,000 in damages.

In the 2018 general election (GE14), Wong was picked by DAP to contest and was elected as an assemblyman for Bemban constituency for the first time. He was also selected to be the Deputy Speaker of the Malacca State Legislative Assembly.

In October 2018, DAP secretary-general Lim Guan Eng had rebuked the DAP Malacca chief Tey Kok Kiew and Wong on the acceptance the Malacca state "Datukship" in their first year as MLA which had breached the party's long-standing principal agreed upon since the mid-1990s on DAP elected representatives not to receive honours awards during their active political service period. Lim called for those involved to apologise which Wong had obliged and even offered to return the award but Tey did not and remained adamant.

Wong was however dropped by DAP as a PH candidate in the subsequent 2021 Malacca state election to give way to younger face.

== Election results ==
Malacca State Legislative Assembly
Year	Constituency	Candidate	Votes	Pct	Opponent(s)	Votes	Pct	Ballots cast	Majority	Turnout
2018	N24 Bemban	Wong Fort Pin (DAP)	6,998	45.40%	Koh Chin Han (MCA)	5,653	36.68%	15,699	1,345	85.40%
2018	N24 Bemban	Wong Fort Pin (DAP)	6,998	45.40%	Suhaimi Harun (PAS)	2,762	17.92%	15,699	1,345	85.40%

== Honours ==
=== Honours of Malaysia ===
- Malacca
  - Companion Class I of the Exalted Order of Malacca (DMSM) – Datuk (2018)
