= Hasan Abd Rahman =

Malaysian politician

Yang Berbahagia Datuk Wira Hasan Abd Rahman DCSM DMSM
- حسن بن عبدالرحمن

Exco roles (Malacca)
- 2011–2013: Deputy Chairman of the Public Works and Public Amenities
- 2013–2018: Chairman of the Agriculture and Entrepreneur Development

Faction represented in Malacca State Legislative Assembly
- 2008–2021: Barisan Nasional

Personal details
- Born: Malacca, Malaysia
- Citizenship: Malaysian
- Party: United Malays National Organisation (UMNO)
- Other political affiliations: Barisan Nasional (BN); Muafakat Nasional (MN)
- Occupation: Politician

Hasan bin Abd Rahman is a Malaysian politician and served as Malacca State Executive Councillor.

== Election results ==
Malacca State Legislative Assembly
Year	Constituency	Candidate	Votes	Pct	Opponent(s)	Votes	Pct	Ballots cast	Majority	Turnout
2008	N28 Sungai Rambai	Hasan Abd Rahman (UMNO)	4,872	65.15%	Aminuddin Abdul Jalil (PAS)	2,606	34.85%	7,616	2,266	82.94%
2013	N28 Sungai Rambai	Hasan Abd Rahman (UMNO)	5,709	63.05%	Kintan Man (PAS)	3,346	36.95%	9,197	2,363	88.40%
2018	N28 Sungai Rambai	Hasan Abd Rahman (UMNO)	5,088	51.33%	Azalina Abdul Rahman (PPBM)	3,419	34.50%	10,114	1,669	85.80%
2018	N28 Sungai Rambai	Hasan Abd Rahman (UMNO)	5,088	51.33%	Zakariya Kasnin (PAS)	1,405	14.17%	10,114	1,669	85.80%

== Honours ==
- Malacca
  - Knight Commander of the Exalted Order of Malacca (DCSM) – Datuk Wira (2021)
  - Companion Class I of the Exalted Order of Malacca (DMSM) – Datuk (2010)
