= Latipah Omar =

Malaysian politician

Yang Berbahagia Datuk Wira Latipah Omar DCSM DMSM DSM BCM KMN AMN
- لطيفة بنت عمر

Exco roles (Malacca)
- 2011–2013: Deputy Chairman of the Rural Development and Agriculture
- 2013–2018: Chairman of the Women Affairs, Family Development and Welfare Affairs
- 2020–2021: Chairman of the Women Affairs, Family Development and Welfare Affairs

Faction represented in Malacca State Legislative Assembly
- 2008–2021: Barisan Nasional

Personal details
- Born: 15 October 1960 (age 65) Tanjung Bidara, Masjid Tanah, Malacca, Federation of Malaya
- Citizenship: Malaysian
- Party: United Malays National Organisation (UMNO)
- Other political affiliations: Barisan Nasional (BN)
- Occupation: Politician

Latipah binti Omar is a Malaysian politician and former serves as Malacca State Executive Councillor.

== Election results ==
Malacca State Legislative Assembly
Year	Constituency	Candidate	Votes	Pct	Opponent(s)	Votes	Pct	Ballots cast	Majority	Turnout
2008	N05 Taboh Naning	Latipah Omar (UMNO)	3,873	70.43%	Abdul Halim Said (PAS)	1,626	29.57%	5,648	2,247	76.90%
2013	N05 Taboh Naning	Latipah Omar (UMNO)	4,520	67.61%	Ab Halim Ab Jalil (PAS)	2,165	32.39%	6,801	2,355	84.96%
2018	N05 Taboh Naning	Latipah Omar (UMNO)	3,329	47.36%	Zairi Suboh (AMANAH)	2,589	36.83%	7,226	740	82.65%
2018	N05 Taboh Naning	Latipah Omar (UMNO)	3,329	47.36%	Asri Shaik Abdul Aziz (PAS)	1,111	15.81%	7,226	740	82.65%

== Honours ==
=== Honours of Malaysia ===
- Malaysia
  - Officer of the Order of the Defender of the Realm (KMN) (2015)
  - Member of the Order of the Defender of the Realm (AMN) (2011)
- Malacca
  - Knight Commander of the Exalted Order of Malacca (DCSM) – Datuk Wira (2020)
  - Companion Class I of the Exalted Order of Malacca (DMSM) – Datuk (2009)
  - Member of the Exalted Order of Malacca (DSM) (2006)
  - Distinguished Service Star (BCM) (2001)
