= Md Rawi Mahmud =

Malaysian politician

Yang Berbahagia Datuk Wira Haji Md Rawi Mahmud DCSM DMSM BKT
- محمد راوي محمود

Exco roles (Malacca)
- 2013–2018: Deputy Chairman of the Education, Higher Education, Science, Technology, Green Technology and Innovation

Faction represented in Malacca State Legislative Assembly
- 2013–2021: Barisan Nasional

Personal details
- Born: Md Rawi bin Mahmud Kampung Sg Buluh, Jelebu, Negeri Sembilan, Malaysia
- Citizenship: Malaysian
- Party: United Malays National Organisation (UMNO)
- Other political affiliations: Barisan Nasional (BN)
- Occupation: Politician

Md Rawi bin Mahmud is a Malaysian politician who served as Deputy Member of the Malacca State Executive Council (EXCO) in the Barisan Nasional (BN) state administration under former Chief Minister Idris Haron from May 2013 to the collapse of the BN state administration in May 2018 as well as Member of the Malacca State Legislative Assembly (MLA) for Tanjung Bidara from May 2013 to November 2021. He is a member of the United Malays National Organisation (UMNO), a component party of the BN coalition.

== Election results ==
Malacca State Legislative Assembly
Year	Constituency	Candidate	Votes	Pct	Opponent(s)	Votes	Pct	Ballots cast	Majority	Turnout
2013	N02 Tanjung Bidara	Md Rawi Mahmud (UMNO)	6,014	77.22%	Imran Abdul Rahman (PAS)	1,774	22.78%	7,889	4,240	87.80%
2018	N02 Tanjung Bidara	Md Rawi Mahmud (UMNO)	4,704	57.32%	Halim Bachik (PKR)	2,001	24.39%	8,521	2,864	84.40%
2018	N02 Tanjung Bidara	Md Rawi Mahmud (UMNO)	4,704	57.32%	Imran Abdul Rahman (PAS)	1,501	18.29%	8,521	2,864	84.40%

== Honours ==
- Malacca
  - Knight Commander of the Exalted Order of Malacca (DCSM) – Datuk Wira (2021)
  - Companion Class I of the Exalted Order of Malacca (DMSM) – Datuk (2015)
  - Recipient of the Commendable Service Star (BKT) (2004)
