= Gadek (state constituency) =

State constituency in Malacca, Malaysia

Gadek (N07)
Malacca constituency

State constituency
- Legislature: Malacca State Legislative Assembly
MLA
Nadarajah Sellappa
BN
- Constituency created: 2003
- First contested: 2004
- Last contested: 2026

Demographics
- Electors (2026): 16,617

N07 Gadek within Malacca, as used for the 2021 state election

Gadek is a state constituency in Malacca, Malaysia, that has been represented in the Malacca State Legislative Assembly.

The state constituency was first contested in 2004 and is mandated to return a single Assemblyman to the Malacca State Legislative Assembly under the first-past-the-post voting system. Since 2021, the State Assemblyman for Gadek is Shanmugam Pitchay from the Malaysian Indian Congress (MIC) which is part of the state's ruling coalition, Barisan Nasional (BN).

== Definition ==
The Gadek constituency contains the polling districts of Bukit Sebang, Pekan Pulau Sebang, Kuala Ina, Arongan, Tanjung Rimau, Padang Sebang, Paya Datuk, Pegoh, Ganun and Pekan Gadek.

== Demographics ==
Ethnic breakdown of Gadek's electorate as of 2026
1. Malay (61.9%)
2. Chinese (19.1%)
3. Indian (17.6%)
4. Other ethnicities (1.40%)

== History ==
=== Polling districts ===
According to the gazette issued on 5 November 2026, the Gadek constituency has a total of 10 polling districts.

State constituency	Polling districts	Code	Location
Gadek (N07)	Bukit Sebang	135/07/01	SMJK Pulau Sebang
Gadek (N07)	Pekan Pulau Sebang	135/07/02	SMK Sultan Mansor Shah
Gadek (N07)	Kuala Ina	135/07/03	SJK (T) Pulau Sebang
Gadek (N07)	Arongan	135/07/04	SK Pulau Sebang
Gadek (N07)	Tanjung Rimau	135/07/05	SRA (JAIM) Padang Sebang
Gadek (N07)	Padang Sebang	135/07/06	SK Padang Sebang
Gadek (N07)	Paya Datuk	135/07/07	SRA (JAIM) Paya Datok
Gadek (N07)	Pegoh	135/07/08	SK Pegoh
Gadek (N07)	Ganun	135/07/09	SK Ganun
Gadek (N07)	Pekan Gadek	135/07/10	SJK (C) Peng Min

=== Representation history ===
Members of the Legislative Assembly for Gadek
Assembly	No	Years	Member	Party
Constituency created from Pulau Sebang and Bukit Sedanan
11th	N07	2004 – 2008	Abdul Ghafar Atan	BN (UMNO)
12th	N07	2008 – 2013	Abdul Ghafar Atan	BN (UMNO)
13th	N07	2013 – 2018	MS Mahadevan Sanacy	BN (MIC)
14th	N07	2018 – 2021	Saminathan Ganesan	PH (DAP)
15th	N07	2021 – 2026	Shanmugam Ptcyhay	BN (MIC)
16th	N07	2026 – present	Nadarajah Sellappa	BN (MIC)

== Election results ==
Malacca state election, 2026
Party	Candidate	Votes	%	∆%
BN	Nadarajah Sellappa	6,472	58.66	▲19.40
PH	Jegasilan Kungamboo	2,958	26.81	▼5.19
PUTRA	Laila Norinda Maun	1,317	11.94	▲11.94
BERSAMA	Laveen Balaprabhakaran	287	2.60	▲2.60
Total valid votes		11,034		
Total rejected ballots		128		
Unreturned ballots		13		
Turnout		11,175	67.25	▲5.02
Registered electors		16,617		
Majority		3,514	31.85	▲24.59
BN hold		Swing		
Source(s) https://electiondata.my/elections/mlk/SE-16/

Malacca state election, 2021
Party	Candidate	Votes	%	∆%
BN	Shanmugam Ptcyhay	3,022	39.26	▼0.24
PH	Saminathan Ganesan	2,463	32.00	▲32.00
PN	Mohd. Amir Fitri Muharram	2,041	26.52	▲26.52
PUTRA	Laila Norinda Maun	68	0.88	▲0.88
Independent	Azafen Amin	60	0.78	▲0.78
Independent	Mohan Singh Booda Singh	23	0.30	▲0.30
Total valid votes		7,697		
Total rejected ballots		175		
Unreturned ballots		15		
Turnout		7,867	62.23	▼19.63
Registered electors		12,641		
Majority		559	7.26	▲4.29
BN gain from PKR		Swing		?
Source(s) https://lom.agc.gov.my/ilims/upload/portal/akta/outputp/1715764/PUB%20583.pdf

Malacca state election, 2018
Party	Candidate	Votes	%	∆%
PKR	Saminathan Ganesan	4,392	42.47	▲9.06
BN	Panirchelvam Pichamuthu	4,085	39.50	▼20.18
PAS	Emransyah Ismail	1,865	18.03	▲18.03
Total valid votes		10,342	100.00	
Total rejected ballots		200		
Unreturned ballots		36		
Turnout		10,578	81.86	▼1.89
Registered electors		12,922		
Majority		307	2.97	▼23.30
PKR gain from BN		Swing		?

Malacca state election, 2013
Party	Candidate	Votes	%	∆%
BN	MS Mahadevan Sanacy	5,975	59.68	▼10.07
PKR	Rajandran Govindasamy	3,345	33.41	▲3.16
Independent	Abdullah Sani Rejab	692	6.91	▲6.91
Total valid votes		10,012	100.00	
Total rejected ballots		244		
Unreturned ballots		0		
Turnout		10,256	83.75	▲10.46
Registered electors		12,246		
Majority		2,630	26.27	▼13.20
BN hold		Swing		
Source(s) "Federal Government Gazette - Notice of Contested Election, State Legislative Assembly for the State of Selangor [P.U. (B) 192/2013]" (PDF). Attorney General's Chambers of Malaysia. 26 April 2013. Archived from the original (PDF) on 2019-12-29. "Federal Government Gazette - Results of Contested Election and Statements of the Poll after the Official Addition of Votes, State Constituencies for the State of Selangor [P.U. (B) 233/2013]" (PDF). Attorney General's Chambers of Malaysia. 22 May 2013. Archived from the original (PDF) on 2018-10-02.

Malacca state election, 2008
Party	Candidate	Votes	%	∆%
BN	Abdul Ghafar Atan	5,326	69.75	▼8.24
PKR	S Kanageswari	2,310	30.25	▲23.98
Total valid votes		7,636	100.00	
Total rejected ballots		228		
Unreturned ballots		14		
Turnout		7,878	73.29	▲1.45
Registered electors		10,749		
Majority		3,016	39.47	▼22.78
BN hold		Swing		

Malacca state election, 2004
Party	Candidate	Votes	%
BN	Abdul Ghafar Atan	5,871	77.99
PAS	Yahaya Ja'alam	1,185	15.74
PKR	Sibapatham Sionavar	472	6.27
Total valid votes		7,528	100.00
Total rejected ballots		227	
Unreturned ballots		0	
Turnout		7,755	71.84
Registered electors		10,795	
Majority		4,686	62.25
This was a new constituency created.
