= Paya Rumput (state constituency) =

State Constituency in Malacca, Malaysia

Paya Rumput (N13)
Malacca constituency

State constituency
- Legislature: Malacca State Legislative Assembly
MLA
Rafie Ahmad
PN
- Constituency created: 1994
- First contested: 1995
- Last contested: 2026

Demographics
- Electors (2026): 46,521
- Area (km²): 47

N13 Paya Rumput within Malacca, as used for the 2021 state election

Paya Rumput is a state constituency in Malacca, Malaysia, that has been represented in the Melaka State Legislative Assembly.

The state constituency was first contested in 1995 and is mandated to return a single Assemblyman to the Melaka State Legislative Assembly under the first-past-the-post voting system.

== Definition ==
The Paya Rumput constituency contains the polling districts of Hujong Padang, Kerubong, Pantai Cheng, Cheng Perdana, Cheng and Tanjung Minyak.

== Demographics ==
Ethnic breakdown of Paya Rumput's electorate as of 2026
1. Malays (62.4%)
2. Chinese (28.9%)
3. Indians (6.10%)
4. Other Ethnicities (2.50%)

== History ==
=== Polling districts ===
According to the gazette issued on 5 November 2026, the Paya Rumput constituency has a total of 6 polling districts.

State constituency	Polling districts	Code	Location
Paya Rumput (N13)	Hujong Padang	136/13/01	SK Paya Rumput; SMK Paya Rumput
Paya Rumput (N13)	Krubong	136/13/02	SK Krubong; SMK Krubong; Dewan Komuniti PPR Krubong
Paya Rumput (N13)	Pantai Cheng	136/13/03	SK Cheng
Paya Rumput (N13)	Cheng Perdana	136/13/04	SK Tanjung Minyak
Paya Rumput (N13)	Cheng	136/13/05	SMK Tun Haji Abdul Malek
Paya Rumput (N13)	Tanjung Minyak	136/13/06	SK Tanjung Minyak 2; SRA (JAIM) Tanjung Minyak 2; Dewan Bunga Tanjung, Tanjung Minyak Jaya

=== Representation history ===
Members of the Legislative Assembly for Paya Rumput
Assembly	No	Years	Member	Party
Constituency created from Tanjong Minyak, Tranquerah and Krubong
9th	N12	1995—1999	Yasin Mohd Sarif	BN (UMNO)
10th	N12	1999—2004	Mohd Ali Rustam	BN (UMNO)
11th	N13	2004—2008	Tahir Hassan	BN (UMNO)
12th	N13	2008—2013	Tahir Hassan	BN (UMNO)
13th	N13	2013—2018	Sazali Muhd Din	BN (UMNO)
14th	N13	2018—2020	Mohd Rafiq Naizamohideen	PH (BERSATU)
14th	N13	2020—2021	Mohd Rafiq Naizamohideen	PN (BERSATU)
15th	N13	2021—2026	Rais Yasin	BN (UMNO)
16th	N13	2026 – present	Rafie Ahmad	PN (PAS)

== Election results ==
Malacca state election, 2026
Party	Candidate	Votes	%	∆%
PN	Rafie Ahmad	19,723	58.79	▲35.71
PH	Azman Abidin	12,538	37.37	▲1.34
BERSAMA	Abdul Rasid Abu Bakar	1,288	3.84	▲3.84
Total valid votes		33,549		
Total rejected ballots		196		
Unreturned ballots		55		
Turnout		33,800	72.66	▲6.50
Registered electors		46,521		
Majority		7,185	21.42	▲17.77
PN gain from BN		Swing		?
Source(s) https://electiondata.my/elections/mlk/SE-16/

Malacca state election, 2021
Party	Candidate	Votes	%	∆%
BN	Rais Yasin	6,830	39.68	▲3.20
PH	Shamsul Iskandar Md Akin	6,201	36.03	▲36.03
PN	Muhammad Fariz Izwan Mazlan	3,972	23.08	▲23.08
Independent	Mohd Jaini Dimon	127	0.73	▲0.73
PUTRA	Muhammad Hashidi Mohd Zin	81	0.47	▲0.47
Total valid votes		17,211		
Total rejected ballots		234		
Unreturned ballots		58		
Turnout		17,503	66.16	▼20.84
Registered electors		26,455		
Majority		629	3.65	▼16.17
BN gain from PKR		Swing		?
Source(s) https://lom.agc.gov.my/ilims/upload/portal/akta/outputp/1715764/PUB%20583.pdf

Malacca state election, 2018
Party	Candidate	Votes	%	∆%
PKR	Mohd Rafiq Naizamohideen	12,102	56.30	▲9.36
BN	Abu Bakar Mohamad Diah	7,843	36.48	▼36.48
PAS	Rafie Ahmad	1,552	7.22	▲7.22
Total valid votes		21,497	100.00	
Total rejected ballots		272		
Unreturned ballots		13		
Turnout		21,782	87.00	▼2.59
Registered electors		25,038		
Majority		4,259	19.82	▲13.70
PKR gain from BN		Swing		?

Malacca state election, 2013
Party	Candidate	Votes	%	∆%
BN	Sazali Muhd Din	11,003	53.06	▼4.08
PKR	Taha Ahmad	9,733	46.94	▲4.08
Total valid votes		20,736	100.00	
Total rejected ballots		257		
Unreturned ballots		0		
Turnout		20,993	89.59	▲7.74
Registered electors		23,432		
Majority		1,270	6.12	▼8.16
BN hold		Swing		
Source(s) "Federal Government Gazette - Notice of Contested Election, State Legislative Assembly for the State of Selangor [P.U. (B) 192/2013]" (PDF). Attorney General's Chambers of Malaysia. 26 April 2013. Archived from the original (PDF) on 29 December 2019. "Federal Government Gazette - Results of Contested Election and Statements of the Poll after the Official Addition of Votes, State Constituencies for the State of Selangor [P.U. (B) 233/2013]" (PDF). Attorney General's Chambers of Malaysia. 22 May 2013. Archived from the original (PDF) on 2 October 2018.

Malacca state election, 2008
Party	Candidate	Votes	%	∆%
BN	Tahir Hassan	7,581	57.14	▼23.39
PKR	Taha Ahmad	5,687	42.86	▲23.39
Total valid votes		13,268	100.00	
Total rejected ballots		243		
Unreturned ballots		67		
Turnout		13,578	81.85	▲0.89
Registered electors		16,589		
Majority		1,894	14.28	▼46.78
BN hold		Swing		

Malacca state election, 2004
Party	Candidate	Votes	%	∆%
BN	Tahir Hassan	8,539	80.5	▲20.53
PKR	Mohd Shafee Said	2,065	19.47	▲19.47
Total valid votes		10,604	100.00	
Total rejected ballots		192		
Unreturned ballots		8		
Turnout		10,804	81.02	▲2.49
Registered electors		13,335		
Majority		6,474	61.05	▲41.06
BN hold		Swing		

Melaka election, 1999
Party	Candidate	Votes	%	∆%
BN	Mohd. Ali Mohd. Rustam	8,632	59.99	▼6.47
DAP	Loo Ah Boo	5,756	40.01	▲15.49
Total valid votes		14,388	100.00	
Total rejected ballots		408		
Unreturned ballots		7		
Turnout		14,803	78.53	▲0.12
Registered electors		18,850		
Majority		2,876	19.99	▼21.96
BN hold		Swing		

Melaka election, 1995
Party	Candidate	Votes	%
BN	Yasin Mohd Sarif	9,003	66.47
DAP	Joseph Junior Sta Maria	3,321	24.52
PAS	Md. Yusoh Muhamad	1,221	9.01
Total valid votes		13,545	100.00
Total rejected ballots		249	
Unreturned ballots		25	
Turnout		13,819	78.41
Registered electors		17,625	
Majority		5,682	41.95
This was a new constituency created.
