= Amiruddin Yusop =

Malaysian politician

Yang Berbahagia Datuk Amiruddin Yusop DMSM
- أميرالدين يوسڤ

Exco roles (Malacca)
- 2011–2013: Deputy Chairman of the Industry, Trade, Entrepreneur Development and Co-operatives
- 2013–2018: Deputy Chairman of the Cooperation Affairs, Human Resources and Non-governmental Organisations

Faction represented in Malacca State Legislative Assembly
- 2008–2021: Barisan Nasional

Personal details
- Born: Malacca, Malaysia
- Citizenship: Malaysian
- Party: United Malays National Organisation (UMNO)
- Other political affiliations: Barisan Nasional (BN)
- Occupation: Politician

Amiruddin bin Yusop is a Malaysian politician and former served as Deputy of Malacca State Executive Councillor.

== Election results ==
Malacca State Legislative Assembly
| Year | Constituency | Candidate | Votes | Pct | Opponent(s) | Votes | Pct | Ballots cast | Majority | Turnout |
|---|---|---|---|---|---|---|---|---|---|---|
| 2008 | N03 Ayer Limau | Amiruddin Yusop (UMNO) | 4,948 | 65.15% | Abu Hussin Tamby (PKR) | 1,565 | 34.85% | 6,667 | 3,383 | 76.31% |
| 2013 | N03 Ayer Limau | Amiruddin Yusop (UMNO) | 6,552 | 63.05% | Halim Bachik (PKR) | 1,983 | 36.95% | 8,702 | 4,569 | 86.70% |
| 2018 | N03 Ayer Limau | Amiruddin Yusop (UMNO) | 4,704 | 51.33% | Ruslin Hasan (PPBM) | 3,225 | 34.50% | 9,308 | 1,479 | 83.00% |
| 2018 | N03 Ayer Limau | Amiruddin Yusop (UMNO) | 4,704 | 51.33% | Jamarudin Ahmad (PAS) | 1,187 | 14.17% | 9,308 | 1,479 | 83.00% |

== Honours ==
- Malacca
  - Companion Class I of the Order of Malacca (DMSM) – Datuk (2013)
