= Ismail Othman =

Malaysian politician

Yang Berbahagia Datuk Wira Ismail Othman DCSM DMSM JP
- إسماعيل بن عثمان

Exco roles (Malacca)
- 2011–2013: Deputy Chairman of the Finance, Lands, Economic Planning, Green Technology, Science and Technology
- 2013–2018: Chairman of the Housing, Local Government and Environment
- 2020–2021: Chairman of the Unity, Human Resources, Community Relations and Consumer Affairs

Faction represented in Malacca State Legislative Assembly
- 2008–2021: Barisan Nasional

Personal details
- Born: 1956 (age 69–70) Malacca, Malaysia
- Citizenship: Malaysian
- Party: United Malays National Organisation (UMNO)
- Other political affiliations: Barisan Nasional (BN)
- Occupation: Politician

Ismail bin Othman is a Malaysian politician and has served as Malacca State Executive Councillor.

== Election results ==
Malacca State Legislative Assembly
Year	Constituency	Candidate	Votes	Pct	Opponent(s)	Votes	Pct	Ballots cast	Majority	Turnout
2008	N01 Kuala Linggi	Ismail Othman (UMNO)	4,468	64.20%	Julasapiyah Kassim (PAS)	2,491	35.80%	7,105	1,977	79.44%
2013	N01 Kuala Linggi	Ismail Othman (UMNO)	5,521	64.12%	Julasapiyah Kassim (PAS)	3,090	35.88%	8,742	2,431	87.13%
2018	N01 Kuala Linggi	Ismail Othman (UMNO)	4,812	52.34%	Hasmorni Tamby (PKR)	3,440	37.42%	9,337	1,372	84.54%
2018	N01 Kuala Linggi	Ismail Othman (UMNO)	4,812	52.34%	Azmi Sambul (PAS)	941	10.24%	9,337	1,372	84.54%

== Honours ==
=== Honours of Malaysia ===
- Malacca
  - Knight Commander of the Exalted Order of Malacca (DCSM) – Datuk Wira (2017)
  - Companion Class I of the Exalted Order of Malacca (DMSM) – Datuk (2010)
  - Justice of the Peace (JP) (2025)
