= Mohd Yadzil Yaakub =

Malaysian politician and medical doctor

Yang Berhormat Mohd Yadzil Yaakub KMN BCM MLA
- محمد يضيل يعقوب

State Leader of the Opposition of Malacca
- Incumbent
- Assumed office 13 December 2022
- Governor: Mohd Ali Rustam
- Chief Minister: Sulaiman Md Ali (2022–2023); Ab Rauf Yusoh (since 2023)
- Preceded by: Adly Zahari

Member of the Malacca State Legislative Assembly for Bemban
- Incumbent
- Assumed office 20 November 2021
- Preceded by: Wong Fort Pin (PH–DAP)
- Majority: 328 (2021); 7,741 (2026)

Personal details
- Born: Mohd Yadzil bin Yaakub; 14 April 1974 (age 52) Kuala Lumpur, Malaysia
- Party: Malaysian United Indigenous Party (BERSATU) (until 2026); National Vision Party (Malaysia) (WAWASAN) (since 2026)
- Other political affiliations: Perikatan Nasional (PN)
- Children: 2
- Education: Medical certificate
- Alma mater: Udayana University, Bali, Indonesia
- Occupation: Politician
- Profession: Medical doctor

Mohd Yadzil bin Yaakub (born 14 April 1974) is a Malaysian politician and medical doctor from the Malaysian United Indigenous Party (BERSATU), a component party of the Perikatan Nasional (BN) coalition who has served as Leader of the Opposition of Malacca since December 2022 and Member of the Malacca State Legislative Assembly (MLA) for Bemban since November 2021. He has served as the State Chairman of PN of Malacca since January 2022 and Division Chief of BERSATU of Jasin since 2020. He served as State Chairman of BERSATU of Malacca from December 2021 to January 2025 and State Deputy Chairman of BERSATU of Malacca from 2021 to his promotion in December 2021 as well as the State Deputy Chairman of PN of Malacca from 2021 to January 2022. He was also the Election Director of the 2021 Malacca state election of PN. He is also one of the only three Malacca Opposition and PN MLAs alongside Sungai Udang MLA Mohd Aleef Yusof and Rembia MLA Muhammad Jailani Khamis.

== Political career ==
On 17 November 2021, Yadzil, PN candidate for the Bemban state seat expressed his confidence in advancing and progressing Bemban. On 20 November 2021, Yadzil was elected into Malacca State Legislative Assembly, winning the Bemban seat from Wong Fort Pin of the Pakatan Harapan (PH) opposition coalition. On 14 December 2021, he was named the State Chairman of PN and BERSATU, replacing Mohd Rafiq Naizamohideen, former EXCO member and former Paya Rumput MLA who lost his reelection as an MLA in the state election. On 17 December 2021, Yadzil said he would leave the political affiliations of himself and another PN MLA, Sungai Udang MLA Mohd Aleef Yusof to PN chairman and BERSATU president Muhyiddin Yassin to decide whether they are affiliated with the government or opposition. Muhyiddin decided that they are to be affiliated with the opposition. On 27 January 2022, he was appointed as the State Chairman of Malacca of PN. On 12 December 2022, he as the State Malacca PN and BERSATU Chairman, was expected to take over as State Leader of the Opposition of Malacca from Bukit Katil MLA Adly Zahari of PH after Chief Minister Sulaiman Md Ali confirmed that PH had joined the state government as strategic partners and the Opposition was then left with only two PN MLAs who are Yadzil and Sungai Udang MLA Mohd Aleef Yusof. This has increased the number of state government MLAs to 26 and strengthened the majority support commanded by the state government led by Sulaiman. The following day on 13 December 2022, he officially did so.

== Non-governmental organisation and other careers ==
He has also been co-chairman of Innovation and Digitalisation Committee of SME Corp of Malaysia and corporation member of SME Corp of Malaysia since 2021. He was secretary of the Malacca branch of the Koperasi Pribumi Bersatu Malaysia Sdn Bhd in 2019 and medical officer of Malacca hospital from 2005 to 2009.

== Election results ==
Malacca State Legislative Assembly
| Year | Constituency | Candidate | Votes | Pct | Opponent(s) | Votes | Pct | Ballots cast | Majority | Turnout |
|---|---|---|---|---|---|---|---|---|---|---|
| 2021 | N24 Bemban | Mohd Yadzil Yaakub (BERSATU) | 4,211 | 34.60% | Koh Chin Han (MCA) | 3,883 | 31.92% | 12,169 | 328 | 65.52% |
| 2021 | N24 Bemban | Mohd Yadzil Yaakub (BERSATU) | 4,211 | 34.60% | Tey Kok Kiew (DAP) | 3,095 | 25.43% | 12,169 | 328 | 65.52% |
| 2021 | N24 Bemban | Mohd Yadzil Yaakub (BERSATU) | 4,211 | 34.60% | Ng Choon Koon (IND) | 850 | 6.98% | 12,169 | 328 | 65.52% |
| 2021 | N24 Bemban | Mohd Yadzil Yaakub (BERSATU) | 4,211 | 34.60% | Azmi Kamis (IND) | 130 | 1.07% | 12,169 | 328 | 65.52% |
| 2026 | N24 Bemban | Mohd Yadzil Yaakub (WAWASAN) | 11,881 | 64.56% | Muhammad Solehin Saleh (BERSAMA) | 4,140 | 22.50% | 18,404 | 7,741 | 70.54% |
| 2026 | N24 Bemban | Mohd Yadzil Yaakub (WAWASAN) | 11,881 | 64.56% | Muhammad Rabaie Ab Hamid (BERSATU) | 2,109 | 11.46% | 18,404 | 7,741 | 70.54% |
| 2026 | N24 Bemban | Mohd Yadzil Yaakub (WAWASAN) | 11,881 | 64.56% | Abd Halim Said (IND) | 274 | 1.49% | 18,404 | 7,741 | 70.54% |

== Honours ==
- Malaysia
  - Officer of the Order of the Defender of the Realm (KMN) (2021)
- Malacca
  - Recipient of the Distinguished Service Star (BCM) (2019)
