= 2026 Malacca state election =

General election for the 16th Malacca State Legislative Assembly

- 14 November 2026

28 of 35 seats in the Legislative Assembly 15 seats needed for a majority
- Registered: 687,697 (▲37.87%)
- Turnout: 71.77% (▲5.92%)
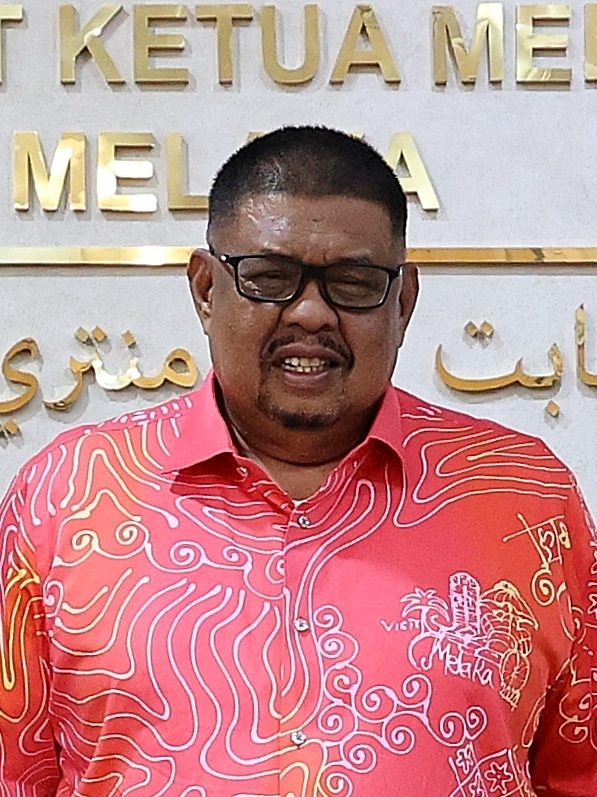

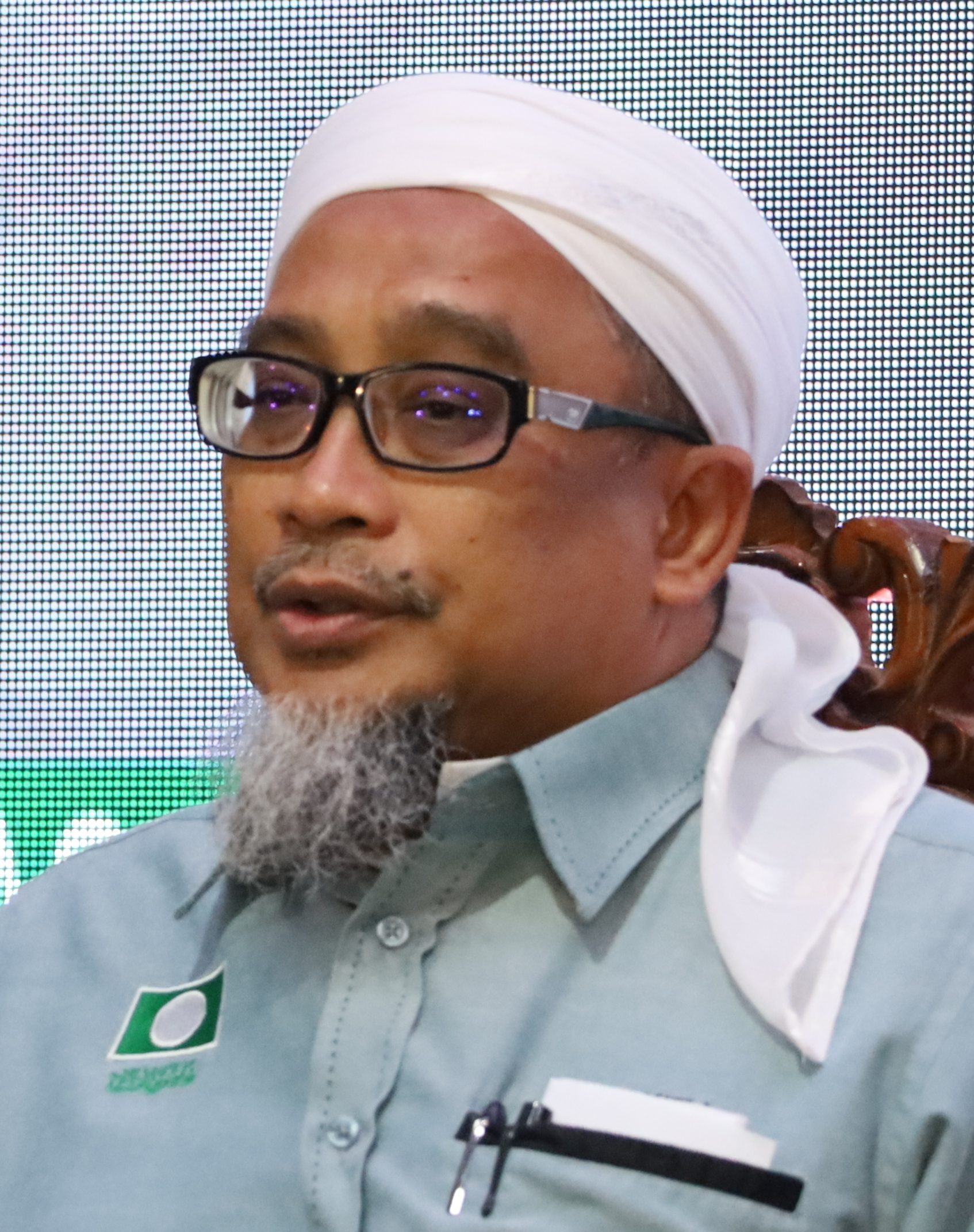

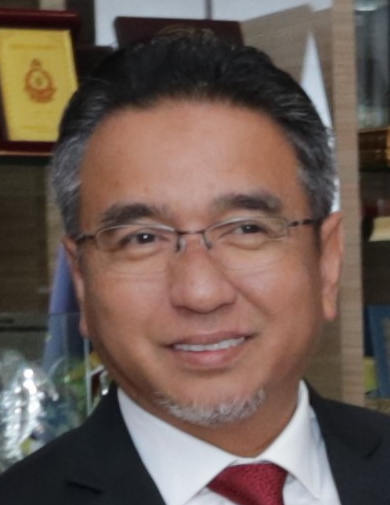
	Majority party	Minority party
Leader	Ab Rauf Yusoh; Zulkifli Ismail (Note: Zulkifli Ismail serves as de facto leader as the status of state PN chairman is disputed)	Adly Zahari
Party	UMNO; PAS	AMANAH
Alliance	BN; PN	PH
Leader since	14 July 2018; 22 November 2021	30 August 2017
Leader's seat	Tanjung Bidara; Did not contest (Note: Federal MP for Jasin.)	Bukit Katil (lost seat)
Last election	23 seats, 48.10%	5 seats, 35.80%
Seats before	23	5
Seats won	24	4
Seat change	▲1	▼1
Popular vote	308,668	143,273
Percentage	63.16%	29.31%
Swing	▲15.06 pp	▼6.49 pp
Chief Minister before election
Ab Rauf Yusoh
BN–UMNO
Elected Chief Minister
Ab Rauf Yusoh
BN-UMNO

The 2026 Malacca state election, formally the 16th Malacca state election took place on 14 November 2026. This election is to elect 28 members of the 16th Malacca State Legislative Assembly. The previous assembly was dissolved on 23 September 2026.

The Barisan Nasional (BN) and Perikatan Nasional (PN) electoral pact, led by Chief Minister Ab Rauf Yusoh, won the election with a combined total of 24 seats. Pakatan Harapan (PH) suffered a loss of one seat, in which state chairman and former Chief Minister Adly Zahari was defeated in his seat of Bukit Katil, becoming the sole incumbent to lose re-election.

== Constituencies ==
Electoral map of Malacca, showing all 28 constituencies

== Composition before dissolution ==
BN			PH		PN
20			5		3
17	2	1	4	1	1	1	1
UMNO	MCA	MIC	DAP	AMANAH	BERSATU	PAS	WAWASAN

== Background ==
=== Previous election ===
The previous state election was held on 20 November 2021 following the dissolution of the 15th State Legislative Assembly. Barisan Nasional won a two-thirds supermajority, securing 21 of 28 seats.

=== 2023: PH joins BN-led state government ===
Barisan Nasional governed alone until 2023, where it invited Pakatan Harapan to the state government to mirror the unity government coalition at the federal level.

=== 2026: PH withdrawal from state government and return to opposition ===
Pakatan Harapan's component party Democratic Action Party (DAP) withdrew from the state government on 14 July 2026 to oppose the BN-led government's move to amend the state Constitution, which would allow the state government to nominate and appoint 7 unelected assembly members.

DAP representatives moved to sit on the opposition benches the next day although state PH chief Adly Zahari (Amanah) remained seated with the government side.

Melaka Pakatan chairman Adly then reaffirmed the decision of the state Pakatan Harapan's departure from the state government during a coalition leadership meeting held on 16 July, agreed by all 3 component parties, PKR, DAP and Amanah, despite calls from Prime Minister Dato' Seri Anwar Ibrahim for DAP to defer its departure from state government.

== Electoral system ==
Election Commission Chairman, Ramlan Harun, overseeing the election process at the Malim Chinese School.

Elections in Malaysia are conducted at the federal and state levels. Federal elections elect members of the Dewan Rakyat, the lower house of Parliament, while state elections in each of the 13 states elect members of their respective state legislative assembly. As Malaysia follows the Westminster system of government, the head of government (Prime Minister at the federal level and the Menteri Besar/Chief Ministers/Premier at the state level) is the person who commands the confidence of the majority of members in the respective legislature – this is normally the leader of the party or coalition with the majority of seats in the legislature.

The Legislative Assembly currently consists of 28 members, known as Members of the Legislative Assembly (MLAs), that are elected for five-year terms. Each MLA is elected from a single-member constituencies using the first-past-the-post voting system; each constituency contains approximately an equal number of voters. If one party obtains a majority of seats, then that party is entitled to form the government, with its leader becoming the Premier. In the event of a hung parliament, where no single party obtains the majority of seats, the government may still form through a coalition or a confidence and supply agreement with other parties. In practice, coalitions and alliances in Malaysia, and by extension, in Sarawak, generally persist between elections, and member parties do not normally contest for the same seats.

On 14 July 2026, the BN-led government moved to amend the state Constitution, which would allow the state government to nominate and appoint 7 unelected assembly members. The amendment was passed by a vote of 23-5 - with all 21 BN and 2 PN representatives in support, and all 5 PH representatives voting against.

The voting age is currently 18. Elections are conducted by the Election Commission of Malaysia, which is under the jurisdiction of the Prime Minister's Department. Malaysia practices automatic voter registration but does not practice compulsory voting.

== Preparations ==
Malaysia Corruption Watch representatives visits the state election media centre ahead of the state polls.

=== Political parties ===
Barisan Nasional is expected to defend its governing mandate, while Pakatan Harapan aims to regain influence after losing control in 2021. Barisan Nasional may also expand its challenge in Malay-majority constituencies. On 17 May 2026, Chief Minister of Malacca (from Barisan Nasional) disclosed a possibility that his state's election could be held within 120 days after his statement. Barisan Nasional claimed on 30 August 2026 it would negotiate coalition talks after the assembly dissolved. Barisan Nasional conditioned any cooperating parties to allow them to defend all seats it held, leaving only seven for possible partners.

Perikatan Nasional specifically sought cooperation with BN, while also prepared itself to contest alone. However Perikatan Nasional was told by Registrar of Societies to formally pause activities on 22 September 2026. If the issue is unresolved in due time, it can force parties of Perikatan Nasional not to use PN's coalition logo in the election. The Malaysian Registrar of Societies (RoS) decided on 20 October 2026 to cancel the registration of Perikatan Nasional (PN) under Subparagraph 13(1)(c)(iv) of the Societies Act 1966 [Act 832]. At the time of deregistration, Perikatan Nasional challenged the earlier activity suspension notice to Kuala Lumpur High Court. As the proceeding is still in progress, the court suspended the effect of both RoS decision to dissolve the party as well as previous notice to suspend party activities until after election, allowing Perikatan Nasional to contest.

Pakatan Harapan and Malaysian United Indigenous Party both stated possible cooperation with other parties without naming specific parties, with speculations both possibly cooperating.

On July 15, while announcing Bersama not contesting Negeri Sembilan state election, de facto leader Rafizi instead stated that this election was the party's next focus.

Seat negotiations among parties are expected to play a major role in determining electoral competitiveness.

== Campaign slogans ==
The state elections witnessed the clash of various parties, with some working together to not contest in the same seats.

Party	Slogan
Perikatan Nasional	Muafakat Melaka
Pakatan Harapan	Melaka Rumah Kita; Undi Harapan
Barisan Nasional	BN Sayang Rakyat; Kita Geng Biru
Malaysian United Indigenous Party	Kemakmuran Bersama Melaka; Bersatu Prihatin Melaka
Malaysian United Party	Ayuh Melaka, Ayuh Bersama; Dulu Kancil Pilih Melaka, Kini Melaka Pilih Kancil

== Timeline ==
The key dates are listed below:

Date	Event
23 September 2026	Dissolution of Malacca State Legislative Assembly.
7 October 2026	Issue the Writ of Election.
31 October 2026	Nomination Day.
31 October–13 November 2026	Campaigning Period.
10–13 November 2026	Early Polling Days for Postal, Overseas and Advance Voters.
14 November 2026	Polling Day.

== Departing incumbents ==
The following members of the 15th Malacca State Legislative Assembly did not seek re-election.

No.	State Constituency	Departing MLA	Coalition (Party)	Date confirmed	First elected	Reason
N04	Lendu	Sulaiman Md Ali	BN (UMNO)	13 October 2026	2013	Not seeking re-election
N09	Durian Tunggal	Zahari Abd Khalil	BN (UMNO)	24 October 2026	2021	Dropped by party
N15	Pengkalan Batu	Kalsom Noordin	BN (UMNO)	24 October 2026	2021	Dropped by party
N18	Ayer Molek	Rahmad Mariman	BN (UMNO)	24 October 2026	2018	Dropped by party
N26	Serkam	Zaidi Attan	BN (UMNO)	24 October 2026	2013	Dropped by party
N28	Sungai Rambai	Siti Faizah Abdul Azis	BN (UMNO)	24 October 2026	2021	Dropped by party
N07	Gadek	Shanmugam Ptcyhay	BN (MIC)	24 October 2026	2021	Dropped by party
N06	Rembia	Muhammad Jailani Khamis	PN (PAS)	29 October 2026	2018 (Note: Formerly PH (PKR) and BN (UMNO))	Dropped by party
N11	Sungai Udang	Mohd Aleef Yusof	PN (WAWASAN)	29 October 2026	2021 (Note: Formerly PN (BERSATU))	Dropped by party

=== Incumbents contested in different party ===
No.	State Constituency	MLA	Coalition (Party)		First elected
No.	State Constituency	MLA	Formerly	Current	First elected
N24	Bemban	Mohd Yadzil Yaakub	PN (BERSATU)	PN (WAWASAN)	2021

=== Incumbents contested in different constituency ===
MLA	Coalition (Party)	State Constituency		First elected
MLA	Coalition (Party)	Formerly	Current	First elected
Rais Yasin	BN (UMNO)	N13 Paya Rumput	N11 Sungai Udang	2021

=== Incumbents lost re-election in the 2026 election ===
No.	State Constituency	Departing MLA	Coalition (Party)	First elected
N17	Bukit Katil	Adly Zahari	PH (AMANAH)	2018

== Candidates ==
No.	Parliamentary constituency	No.	State Constituency	Number of Voters	Constituency Largest Ethnic	Incumbent Member	Incumbent Coalition (Party)	Political coalitions and respective candidates and coalitions									
No.	Parliamentary constituency	No.	State Constituency	Number of Voters	Constituency Largest Ethnic	Incumbent Member	Incumbent Coalition (Party)	Barisan Nasional (BN) + Perikatan Nasional (PN)		Pakatan Harapan (PH)		Malaysian United Party (BERSAMA)		Malaysian United Indigenous Party (BERSATU)		Others	
No.	Parliamentary constituency	No.	State Constituency	Number of Voters	Constituency Largest Ethnic	Incumbent Member	Incumbent Coalition (Party)	Candidate name	Party	Candidate name	Party	Candidate name	Party	Candidate name	Party	Candidate name	Party
P134	Masjid Tanah	N01	Kuala Linggi	15,483	Malay	Rosli Abdullah	BN (UMNO)	Rosli Abdullah	UMNO	Muhammad Mukhlisul Mubin Julasapiyah	AMANAH	Nur Farhana Hamzah	BERSAMA	Not Contested			
P134	Masjid Tanah	N02	Tanjung Bidara	15,003	Malay	Ab Rauf Yusoh	BN (UMNO)	Ab Rauf Yusoh	UMNO	Mohd Yunazri Mustamiri	PKR	Not Contested		Not Contested			
P134	Masjid Tanah	N03	Ayer Limau	15,379	Malay	Hameed Mytheen Kunju Basheer	BN (UMNO)	Hameed Mytheen Kunju Basheer	UMNO	Mohd Jaini Dimon	PKR	Not Contested		Not Contested			
P134	Masjid Tanah	N04	Lendu	15,043	Malay	Sulaiman Md Ali	BN (UMNO)	Abdul Hakim Abdul Wahid	UMNO	Not Contested		Not Contested		Nazri Ramli	BERSATU		
P134	Masjid Tanah	N05	Taboh Naning	11,299	Malay	Zulkiflee Mohd Zin	BN (UMNO)	Zulkiflee Mohd Zin	UMNO	Junainah Sahat	AMANAH	Not Contested		Not Contested			
P135	Alor Gajah	N06	Rembia	23,291	Malay	Muhammad Jailani Khamis	PN (PAS)	Ahmad Norazril Abd Aziz	UMNO	Mohd Khuzaire Mohd Kamal	PKR	Muhamed Aman Akil Abdul Talib	BERSAMA	Not Contested			
P135	Alor Gajah	N07	Gadek	16,617	Malay	Shanmugam Ptcyhay	BN (MIC)	Nadarajah Sellappa	MIC	Jegasilan Kungamboo	DAP	Laveen Balaprabhakaran	BERSAMA	Not Contested		Laila Norinda Maon	PUTRA
P135	Alor Gajah	N08	Machap Jaya	16,030	Malay	Ngwe Hee Sem	BN (MCA)	Ngwe Hee Sem	MCA	Ginie Lim Siew Lin	PKR	Prasanth Kumar Brakasam	BERSAMA	Not Contested			
P135	Alor Gajah	N09	Durian Tunggal	21,181	Malay	Zahari Abd Khalil	BN (UMNO)	Mustafa Musa	UMNO	Ashraf Mukhlis Minghat	AMANAH	Not Contested		Not Contested			
P135	Alor Gajah	N10	Asahan	20,217	Malay	Fairul Nizam Roslan	BN (UMNO)	Fairul Nizam Roslan	UMNO	Denesh Palasubraniam	PKR	Not Contested		Not Contested			
P136	Tangga Batu	N11	Sungai Udang	29,692	Malay	Mohd Aleef Yusof	PN (WAWASAN)	Rais Yasin	UMNO	Not Contested		Mohd Ridzuan Abdul Rahman	BERSAMA	Abdullah Mahadi	BERSATU		
P136	Tangga Batu	N12	Pantai Kundor	20,855	Malay	Tuminah Kadi	BN (UMNO)	Tuminah Kadi	UMNO	Not Contested		Not Contested		Asmah Samat	BERSATU		
P136	Tangga Batu	N13	Paya Rumput	46,521	Malay	Rais Yasin	BN (UMNO)	Rafie Ahmad	PAS	Azman Abidin	PKR	Abdul Rasid Abu Bakar	BERSAMA	Not Contested			
P136	Tangga Batu	N14	Kelebang	27,339	Malay	Lim Ban Hong	BN (MCA)	Lim Ban Hong	MCA	Farzana Hayani Mohd Nasir	PKR	Young Jie Yu	BERSAMA	Mohamad Ali Mohamad	BERSATU		
P137	Hang Tuah Jaya	N15	Pengkalan Batu	25,948	Malay	Kalsom Noordin	BN (UMNO)	Siti Aisyah Mahmood	UMNO	Jason Tze-Xi Nathan	DAP	Goh Han Koon	BERSAMA	Norhizam Hassan Baktee	BERSATU		
P137	Hang Tuah Jaya	N16	Ayer Keroh	38,252	Chinese	Kerk Chee Yee	PH (DAP)	Michael Gan Peng Lam	GERAKAN	Kerk Chee Yee	DAP	Muhammad Muhaimin Lau Abdullah	BERSAMA	Mohd Hamnaim Mohamad	BERSATU		
P137	Hang Tuah Jaya	N17	Bukit Katil	35,359	Malay	Adly Zahari	PH (AMANAH)	Ridzuan Sarif	PAS	Adly Zahari	AMANAH	Aliza Che Azman	BERSAMA	Not Contested		Abu Bakar Sabudin	IND
P137	Hang Tuah Jaya	N18	Ayer Molek	24,614	Malay	Rahmad Mariman	BN (UMNO)	Mohd Ridhwan Mohd Ali	UMNO	Muhammad Hakimin Mokhtar	PKR	Not Contested		Not Contested			
P138	Kota Melaka	N19	Kesidang	54,910	Chinese	Allex Seah Shoo Chin	PH (DAP)	Albert Kok Boon Chang	WAWASAN	Allex Seah Shoo Chin	DAP	Bryan Kek Kit Hun	BERSAMA	Not Contested			
P138	Kota Melaka	N20	Kota Laksamana	34,066	Chinese	Low Chee Leong	PH (DAP)	Melvin Chua Kew Wei	MCA	Low Chee Leong	DAP	Ethan Lim Zhu Hao	BERSAMA	Not Contested			
P138	Kota Melaka	N21	Duyong	26,528	Malay	Mohd Noor Helmy Abdul Halem	BN (UMNO)	Mohd Noor Helmy Abdul Halem	UMNO	Poo Long Suan	DAP	Not Contested		Not Contested			
P138	Kota Melaka	N22	Bandar Hilir	23,042	Chinese	Leng Chau Yen	PH (DAP)	Jasmine Lok Huey Yee	MCA	Leng Chau Yen	DAP	Mohd Nor Rashidi Ab Jalil	BERSAMA	Not Contested			
P138	Kota Melaka	N23	Telok Mas	29,751	Malay	Abdul Razak Abdul Rahman	BN (UMNO)	Abdul Razak Abdul Rahman	UMNO	Mohamad Jaafar	AMANAH	Muhammad Hazwan Mustafa	BERSAMA	Not Contested			
P139	Jasin	N24	Bemban	26,381	Malay	Mohd Yadzil Yaakub	PN (WAWASAN)	Mohd Yadzil Yaakub	WAWASAN	Not Contested		Muhammad Solehin Saleh	BERSAMA	Muhammad Rabaie Ab Hamid	BERSATU	Abd Halim Said	IND
P139	Jasin	N25	Rim	17,742	Malay	Khaidirah Abu Zahar	BN (UMNO)	Khaidirah Abu Zahar	UMNO	Esma Eazreen Husin	PKR	Not Contested		Not Contested			
P139	Jasin	N26	Serkam	21,352	Malay	Zaidi Attan	BN (UMNO)	Azman Abdullah	UMNO	Muhammad Faiq Azman	PKR	Muhammad Saffie Md Salam	BERSAMA	Not Contested			
P139	Jasin	N27	Merlimau	19,759	Malay	Muhamad Akmal Saleh	BN (UMNO)	Muhamad Akmal Saleh	UMNO	Rahayu Hamzah	AMANAH	Not Contested		Not Contested			
P139	Jasin	N28	Sungai Rambai	16,043	Malay	Siti Faizah Abdul Azis	BN (UMNO)	Jezlee Pit	UMNO	Aminuddin Abdul Jalil	AMANAH	Not Contested		Not Contested		Noorizan Jantan	IND

=== Statistics and Summary ===
79 candidates are nominated in this election.

Alliance / Party / Independents		Number of candidates
Pakatan Harapan (PH)	People's Justice Party (PKR)	10
Pakatan Harapan (PH)	Democratic Action Party (DAP)	7
Pakatan Harapan (PH)	National Trust Party (AMANAH)	7
Pakatan Harapan (PH)	Total	24
Barisan Nasional (BN)	United Malays National Organisation (UMNO)	18
Barisan Nasional (BN)	Malaysian Chinese Association (MCA)	4
Barisan Nasional (BN)	Malaysian Indian Congress (MIC)	1
Barisan Nasional (BN)	Total	23
Malaysian United Party (BERSAMA)		16
Parti Pribumi Bersatu Malaysia (BERSATU)		7
Perikatan Nasional (PN)	Parti Islam Se-Malaysia (PAS)	2
Perikatan Nasional (PN)	National Vision Party (WAWASAN)	2
Perikatan Nasional (PN)	Parti Gerakan Rakyat Malaysia (GERAKAN)	1
Perikatan Nasional (PN)	Total	5
Independent		3
Parti Bumiputera Perkasa Malaysia (PUTRA)		1
Total		79

==== Seats contested by candidates ====
Number of candidates	Number of seats contested
2-way contest	11 (Note: Seats are N02 Tanjung Bidara, N03 Ayer Limau, N04 Lendu, N05 Taboh Naning, N09 Durian Tunggal, N10 Asahan, N12 Pantai Kundor, N18 Ayer Molek, N21 Duyong, N25 Rim, N27 Merlimau.)
3-way contest	11 (Note: Seats are N01 Kuala Linggi, N06 Rembia, N08 Machap Jaya, N11 Sungai Udang, N13 Paya Rumput, N19 Kesidang, N20 Kota Laksamana, N22 Bandar Hilir, N23 Telok Mas, N26 Serkam, N28 Sungai Rambai.)
4-way contest	6 (Note: Seats are N07 Gadek, N14 Kelebang, N15 Pengkalan Batu, N16 Ayer Keroh, N17 Bukit Katil, N24 Bemban.)

==== Candidates gender ====
Gender	Number of candidates
Male	65
Female	14

==== Candidates age range ====
Age range	Number of candidates
20 - 29	2
30 - 39	14
40 - 49	33
50 - 59	22
60 and above	2

== Opinion polls ==
Pollster	Fieldwork date	Sample size	BN	PH	PN	Others	Lead	Ref
Ilham Centre	1 − 12 November 2026	805						

== Results ==
Barisan Nasional announces its victory alongside Perikatan Nasional leaders on election night.

=== Summary ===
2026 Malacca State Election
Party or alliance		Votes	%	Seats	+/–
Barisan Nasional + Perikatan Nasional	United Malays National Organisation	207,711	42.50	18	+0
Barisan Nasional + Perikatan Nasional	Malaysian Islamic Party	35,028	7.17	2	+1
Barisan Nasional + Perikatan Nasional	Malaysian Chinese Association	26,468	5.42	2	+0
Barisan Nasional + Perikatan Nasional	National Vision Party	24,515	5.02	1	New
Barisan Nasional + Perikatan Nasional	Parti Gerakan Rakyat Malaysia	8,474	1.73	0	+0
Barisan Nasional + Perikatan Nasional	Malaysian Indian Congress	6,472	1.32	1	+0
Barisan Nasional + Perikatan Nasional	Total	308,668	63.16	24	+1
Pakatan Harapan	Democratic Action Party	74,068	15.15	4	+0
Pakatan Harapan	People's Justice Party	40,701	8.33	0	+0
Pakatan Harapan	National Trust Party	28,504	5.83	0	–1
Pakatan Harapan	Total	143,273	29.31	4	–1
Malaysian United Party		19,176	3.92	0	New
Malaysian United Indigenous Party		15,428	3.16	0	–2
Parti Bumiputera Perkasa Malaysia		1,317	0.27	0	+0
Independents		875	0.18	0	+0
Total		488,737	100.00	28	–
Valid votes		488,737	99.14		
Invalid/blank votes		4,247	0.86		
Total votes		492,984	100.00		
Registered voters/turnout		687,697	71.69		
Source: electiondata.MY

↓
Barisan Nasional + Perikatan Nasional government (24)					Pakatan Harapan opposition (4)
21			3		4
Barisan Nasional			Perikatan Nasional		Pakatan Harapan
18	2	1	2	1	4
UMNO	MCA	MIC	PAS	WAWASAN	DAP
Malacca State Legislative Assembly, 14 November 2026 (28 seats)

=== By parliamentary constituency ===
No.	Constituency	Barisan Nasional + Perikatan Nasional	Pakatan Harapan	Others	Member of Parliament
P134	Masjid Tanah	85.56%	13.61%	0.84%	Mas Ermieyati Samsudin
P135	Alor Gajah	66.60%	29.57%	3.83%	Adly Zahari
P136	Tangga Batu	76.23%	20.04%	3.73%	Bakri Jamaluddin
P137	Hang Tuah Jaya	60.46%	35.30%	4.25%	Adam Adli Abd Halim
P138	Kota Melaka	45.01%	49.85%	5.14%	Khoo Poay Tiong
P139	Jasin	79.82%	13.07%	7.11%	Zulkifli Ismail

=== Lost deposits ===
Alliance / Party / Independents		Number of candidates
Malaysian United Party (BERSAMA)		15 (Note: N01 Kuala Linggi, N06 Rembia, N07 Gadek, N08 Machap Jaya, N11 Sungai Udang, N13 Paya Rumput, N14 Kelebang, N15 Pengkalan Batu, N16 Ayer Keroh, N17 Bukit Katil, N19 Kesidang, N20 Kota Laksamana, N22 Bandar Hilir, N23 Telok Mas, N26 Serkam.)
Parti Pribumi Bersatu Malaysia (BERSATU)		5 (Note: N11 Sungai Udang, N14 Kelebang, N15 Pengkalan Batu, N16 Ayer Keroh, N24 Bemban.)
Independent		3 (Note: N17 Bukit Katil, N24 Bemban, N28 Sungai Rambai.)
Pakatan Harapan (PH)	People's Justice Party (PKR)	2 (Note: N03 Ayer Limau, N26 Serkam.)
Parti Bumiputera Perkasa Malaysia (PUTRA)		1 (Note: N07 Gadek.)
Total		26

=== Flipped seats ===
No.	Seat	Previous Party (2021)	Current Party (2026)
N11	Sungai Udang	PN (BERSATU)	BN (UMNO)
N13	Paya Rumput	BN (UMNO)	PN (PAS)
N17	Bukit Katil	PH (AMANAH)	PN (PAS)
N24	Bemban	PN (BERSATU)	PN (WAWASAN)

=== Post-election pendulum ===
Pre-election pendulum

GOVERNMENT SEATS
Marginal
Pengkalan Batu	Kalsom Noordin	UMNO	35.77
Kelebang	Lim Ban Hong	MCA	38.29
Duyong	Mohd. Noor Helmy Abdul Halem	UMNO	38.55
Gadek	Shanmugam V. Pitchay	MIC	39.26
Paya Rumput	Rais Yasin	UMNO	39.68
Pantai Kundor	Tuminah Kadi @ Mohd Hashim	UMNO	40.03
Rembia	Muhammad Jailani Khamis	UMNO	41.61
Telok Mas	Abdul Razak Abdul Rahman	UMNO	43.01
Serkam	Zaidi Attan	UMNO	43.32
Rim	Khaidirah Abu Zahar	UMNO	45.31
Machap Jaya	Ngwe Hee Sem	MCA	46.67
Sungai Rambai	Siti Faizah Abd. Azis	UMNO	48.08
Tanjung Bidara	Ab. Rauf Yusoh	UMNO	49.14
Kuala Linggi	Rusli Abdullah	UMNO	51.07
Ayer Molek	Rahmad Mariman	UMNO	51.07
Ayer Limau	Hameed Mytheen Kunju Basheer	UMNO	51.94
Fairly safe
Taboh Naning	Zulkiflee Mohd. Zin	UMNO	57.23
Merlimau	Dr. Muhamad Akmal Salleh	UMNO	58.43
Safe
Lendu	Sulaiman Md. Ali	UMNO	63.87
Asahan	Fairul Nizam Roslan	UMNO	65.77

NON-GOVERNMENT SEATS
Marginal
Bemban	Dr. Mohd Yadzil Yaakub	BERSATU	34.60
Bukit Katil	Adly Zahari	AMANAH	41.55
Sungai Udang	Dr. Mohd. Aleef Yusof	BERSATU	43.65
Fairly safe
Ayer Keroh	Kerk Chee Yee	DAP	59.97
Safe
Kesidang	Allex Seah Shoo Chin	DAP	65.86
Kota Laksamana	Dr. Low Chee Leong	DAP	80.83
Bandar Hilir	Leng Chau Yen	DAP	81.19

Post-election pendulum

GOVERNMENT SEATS
Marginal
Machap Jaya	Ngwe Hee Sem	MCA	58.56
Gadek	Nadarajah Sellappa	MIC	58.66
Fairly safe
Paya Rumput	Rafie Ahmad	PAS	58.79
Pantai Kundor	Tuminah Kadi @ Mohd Hashim	UMNO	59.19
Safe
Bukit Katil	Muhammad Ridzuan Mohd Sarif	PAS	60.65
Pengkalan Batu	Siti Aisyah Mahmood	UMNO	62.93
Kelebang	Lim Ban Hong	MCA	63.57
Bemban	Mohd Yadzil Yaakub	WAWASAN	64.56
Durian Tunggal	Mustafa Musa	UMNO	64.86
Rembia	Ahmad Norazril Abd Aziz	UMNO	65.77
Kuala Linggi	Rosli Abdullah	UMNO	70.06
Telok Mas	Abdul Razak Abdul Rahman	UMNO	73.35
Duyong	Mohd Noor Helmy Abdul Halem	UMNO	74.98
Rim	Khaidirah Abu Zahar	UMNO	78.13
Sungai Rambai	Jezlee Pit	UMNO	78.72
Lendu	Abdul Hakim Abdul Wahid	UMNO	78.96
Merlimau	Muhamad Akmal Saleh	UMNO	79.71
Taboh Naning	Zulkiflee Mohd Zin	UMNO	81.76
Asahan	Fairul Nizam Roslan	UMNO	82.01
Ayer Molek	Mohd Ridhwan Mohd Ali	UMNO	83.58
Sungai Udang	Rais Yasin	UMNO	84.25
Serkam	Azman Abdullah	UMNO	86.07
Tanjung Bidara	Ab Rauf Yusoh	UMNO	87.32
Ayer Limau	Hameed Mytheen Kunju Basheer	UMNO	88.13

NON-GOVERNMENT SEATS
Marginal
Ayer Keroh	Kerk Chee Yee	DAP	55.08
Safe
Kesidang	Allex Seah Shoo Chin	DAP	60.03
Kota Laksamana	Low Chee Leong	DAP	68.35
Bandar Hilir	Leng Chau Yen	DAP	74.52

== Aftermath ==
Shortly before 11:30 p.m (GMT +8) on 14 November 2026, Malaysia's Election Commission (EC) announced the final results. Barisan Nasional was able to retain 20 seats (excluding Paya Rumput) which they won in 2021. They were also able to regain Sungai Udang that was lost to BERSATU in 2021.

Perikatan Nasional gained 3 seats - Paya Rumput, Bukit Katil (won by Malaysian Islamic Party), and Bemban (won by National Vision Party). Pakatan Harapan's leader in Melaka, also the federal Deputy Minister of Defence of Malaysia, Adly Zahari, lost his seat in Bukit Katil (state constituency) by a majority of 6,607 to Muhammad Ridzuan Mohd Sarif. The Democratic Action Party was able to retain 4 seats (Ayer Keroh, Kesidang, Bandar Hilir and Kota Laksamana) that it won on 2021. Malaysian United Indigenous Party and Malaysian United Party suffered an electoral wipeout and Muhammad Solehin Saleh in Bemban was the sole BERSAMA candidate that retained his deposit.

Ab Rauf Yusoh was sworn in for a second term as Chief Minister of Malacca at 11:00 a.m. on 15 November 2026 at Kompleks Seri Negeri in Ayer Keroh at the head of a Barisan Nasional and Perikatan Nasional coalition government.

The closest result in this election was Machap Jaya, won by Ngwe Hee Sem by a vote of 2,238.
