= Adly Zahari =

Malaysian politician (born 1971)

Yang Berhormat Tuan Adly Zahari MP
- عدلي ظهري
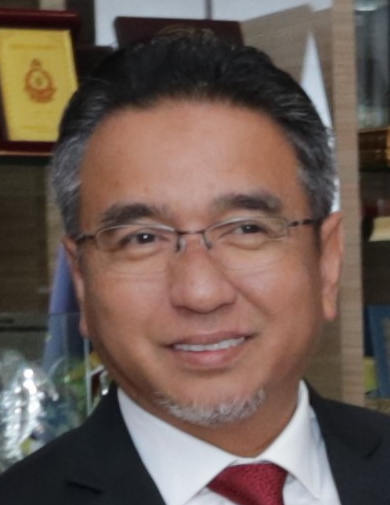
- Adly in 2020

Deputy Minister of Defence
- Incumbent
- Assumed office 10 December 2022
- Monarchs: Abdullah (2022–2024); Ibrahim Iskandar (since 2024)
- Prime Minister: Anwar Ibrahim
- Minister: Mohamad Hasan (2022–2023); Mohamed Khaled Nordin (since 2023)
- Preceded by: Ikmal Hisham Abdul Aziz
- Constituency: Alor Gajah

11th Chief Minister of Malacca
- In office 11 May 2018 – 9 March 2020
- Governor: Mohd Khalil Yaakob
- Preceded by: Idris Haron
- Succeeded by: Sulaiman Md Ali
- Constituency: Bukit Katil

State Leader of the Opposition of Malacca
- In office 24 April 2020 – 13 December 2022
- Governor: Mohd Khalil Yaakob (2020); Mohd Ali Rustam (2020–2022)
- Chief Minister: Sulaiman Md Ali
- Preceded by: Idris Haron
- Succeeded by: Mohd Yadzil Yaakub
- Constituency: Bukit Katil

Member of the Malaysian Parliament for Alor Gajah
- Incumbent
- Assumed office 19 November 2022
- Preceded by: Mohd Redzuan Md Yusof (PH–BERSATU)
- Majority: 890 (2022)

Member of the Malacca State Legislative Assembly for Bukit Katil
- In office 9 May 2018 – 14 November 2026
- Preceded by: Position established
- Succeeded by: Muhammad Ridzuan Mohd Shariff (PN–PAS)
- Majority: 3,159 (2018); 1,057 (2021)

Vice President of the National Trust Party
- Incumbent
- Assumed office 5 September 2021 Serving with Mujahid Yusof Rawa (2021–2023) & Hasanuddin Mohd Yunus (2021–2023) & Mahfuz Omar (since 2021) & Siti Mariah Mahmud (since 2021); Dzulkefly Ahmad (since 2023); Mohd Hatta Ramli (since 2024)
- President: Mohamad Sabu

State Chairman of Pakatan Harapan of Kelantan
- Incumbent
- Assumed office 5 November 2024
- National Chairman: Anwar Ibrahim
- Deputy: Mohamad Suparadi Md Noor
- Preceded by: Muhammad Husain

State Chairman of Pakatan Harapan of Malacca
- Incumbent
- Assumed office 30 August 2017
- National Chairman: Mahathir Mohamad (2017–2020); Anwar Ibrahim (since 2020)
- Preceded by: Position established

Personal details
- Born: Adly bin Zahari; 15 February 1971 (age 55) Kampung Pulau, Durian Tunggal, Malacca, Malaysia
- Citizenship: Malaysian
- Party: Malaysian Islamic Party (PAS) (until 2015); National Trust Party (AMANAH) (since 2015)
- Other political affiliations: Pakatan Rakyat (PR) (2008–2015); Pakatan Harapan (PH) (since 2015)
- Spouse: Dalilah Awaluddin
- Children: 7
- Education: Universiti Teknologi Malaysia (BEng)
- Occupation: Politician
- Profession: Electrical Engineer

Adly bin Zahari (Jawi: عدلي بن ظهري; born 15 February 1971) is a Malaysian politician who has served as the Deputy Minister of Defence in the Unity Government administration under Prime Minister Anwar Ibrahim and Minister Mohamad Hasan since December 2022, Member of Parliament (MP) for Alor Gajah since November 2022 and Member of the Malacca State Legislative Assembly (MLA) for Bukit Katil from May 2018 till September 2026. He served as the 11th Chief Minister of Malacca from May 2018 to March 2020 and State Leader of the Opposition of Malacca from April 2020 to December 2022. He is a member of the National Trust Party (AMANAH), a component party of the PH coalition and was a member of the Malaysian Islamic Party (PAS), a component party of formerly the Pakatan Rakyat (PR) coalition. In AMANAH, he has served as a Vice-President since September 2021 and State Chairman of Malacca since August 2017. He was also the Treasurer-General of AMANAH prior to his promotion to the party vice presidency.

== Education & Early Career ==
Adly attended Sekolah Menengah Teknik Melaka, Bukit Piatu and obtained his Bachelor of Electrical Engineering (BEng) with honours from University of Technology Malaysia (UTM). During his schooling days, he was an orator and represented his school in several public speaking competitions at both state & national level. He became an engineer, served in the corporate sectors and started his own business before joining the politics.

== Political career ==
He was a member of the Malaysian Islamic Party (PAS) prior to joining its new splinter party AMANAH in 2015.

=== Member of the Malacca State Legislative Assembly (since 2018) ===
In the 2018 Malacca state election, Adly made his electoral debut after being nominated by PH to contest for the Bukit Katil state seat. He won the seat and was elected to the Malacca State Legislative Assembly as the Bukit Katil MLA for the first term. In the snap 2021 Malacca state election, Adly was renominated by PH to defend the Bukit Katil seat. He defended the seat and was reelected to the assembly for the second term. However, he was the only winner of his party and he was left as the only Malacca MLA of AMANAH after the snap election.

=== Chief Minister of Malacca (2018–2020) ===
On 11 May 2018, a historic and first ever transition of power took place in Malacca as the State Chairman of PH of Malacca Adly being sworn in as the new Chief Minister of Malacca after BN lost to PH in 2018 state election where PH won a simple majority in the assembly by taking 15 of the 28 state seats to form the new state government. During his tenure as Chief Minister, he reportedly rejected an offer for a Datukship.

=== State Leader of the Opposition of Malacca (2020–2022) ===
After PH lost power to BN, PH returned to the Opposition. On 24 April 2020, Adly, the State Chairman of PH of Malacca, became the new State Leader of the Opposition, in line with the Westminster parliamentary convention, where the leader of the largest party or coalition that is not in the government becomes the Leader of the Opposition. On 13 December 2022, Adly relinquished the position to Mohd Yadzil Yaakub after Chief Minister Sulaiman confirmed that PH had left the opposition and supported his government as a strategic partner.

=== Member of Parliament (since 2022) ===
In the 2022 general election, Adly was nominated by PH to contest for the Alor Gajah federal seat. He narrowly won the seat and was elected to Parliament as the Alor Gajah MP after defeating Shahril Sufian Hamdan of BN by a majority of only 820 votes.

=== Deputy Minister of Defence (since 2022) ===
On 10 December 2022, Adly was appointed as the Deputy Minister of Defence to deputise for Minister Mohamad Hasan by Prime Minister Anwar. It was speculated that Adly was to be promoted to replace Salahuddin Ayub who died in office in July 2023 as the Minister of Domestic Trade and Costs of Living in a cabinet reshuffle. However, Armizan Mohd Ali of the Gabungan Rakyat Sabah (GRS) was instead appointed to position and Adly remained the Deputy Minister of Defence after the reshuffle.

== Election results ==
Parliament of Malaysia
Year	Constituency	Candidate	Votes	Pct	Opponent(s)	Votes	Pct	Ballots cast	Majority	Turnout
2022	P135 Alor Gajah	Adly Zahari (AMANAH)	28,178	38.60%	Shahril Sufian Hamdan (UMNO)	27,288	37.38%	73,000	890	78.23%
2022	P135 Alor Gajah	Adly Zahari (AMANAH)	28,178	38.60%	Mohd Redzuan Md Yusof (BERSATU)	17,211	23.58%	73,000	890	78.23%
2022	P135 Alor Gajah	Adly Zahari (AMANAH)	28,178	38.60%	Muhammad Nazriq Abdul Rahman (PEJUANG)	323	0.44%	73,000	890	78.23%

Malacca State Legislative Assembly
Year	Constituency	Candidate	Votes	Pct	Opponent(s)	Votes	Pct	Ballots cast	Majority	Turnout
2013	N09 Durian Tunggal	Adly Zahari (PAS)	4,329	43.40%	Ab Wahab Ab Latip (UMNO)	5,645	56.60%	10,133	1,316	89.62%
2018	N17 Bukit Katil	Adly Zahari (AMANAH)	11,226	44.80%	Yunus Hitam (UMNO)	8,067	32.20%	21,530	3,159	85.87%
2018	N17 Bukit Katil	Adly Zahari (AMANAH)	11,226	44.80%	Muhamat Puhat Bedol (PAS)	2,237	8.90%	21,530	3,159	85.87%
2021	N17 Bukit Katil	Adly Zahari (AMANAH)	6,805	41.55%	Hasnoor Sidang Husin (UMNO)	5,748	35.10%	16,377	1,057	65.14%
2021	N17 Bukit Katil	Adly Zahari (AMANAH)	6,805	41.55%	Muhammad Al Afiz Yahya (PAS)	3,715	22.68%	16,377	1,057	65.14%
2021	N17 Bukit Katil	Adly Zahari (AMANAH)	6,805	41.55%	Abdul Hamid Mustapah (IND)	109	0.07%	16,377	1,057	65.14%
2026	N17 Bukit Katil	Adly Zahari (AMANAH)	8,698	34.47%	Muhammad Ridzuan Mohd Sarif (PAS)	15,305	60.65%	25,237	6,607	72.00%
2026	N17 Bukit Katil	Adly Zahari (AMANAH)	8,698	34.47%	Aliza Che Amran (BERSAMA)	1,119	4.43%	25,237	6,607	72.00%
2026	N17 Bukit Katil	Adly Zahari (AMANAH)	8,698	34.47%	Abu Bakar Sabudin (IND)	115	0.46%	25,237	6,607	72.00%

== Honours ==
=== Honours of Malaysia ===
- Malaysia
  - Recipient of the 17th Yang di-Pertuan Agong Installation Medal (2024)

Political offices
Preceded by Idris Haron	11th Chief Minister of Malacca; 2018 - 2020	Succeeded by Sulaiman Md Ali
