= Siti Faizah Abdul Azis =

Malaysian politician (born 1975)

Yang Berbahagia Datuk Siti Faizah Abdul Azis DPSM DSM BCM BKT PJK

Deputy Member of the Malacca State Executive Council
- Incumbent
- Assumed office 6 April 2023 (Health, Human Resources and Unity)
- Governor: Mohd Ali Rustam
- Chief Minister: Ab Rauf Yusoh
- Member: Ngwe Hee Sem
- Preceded by: Portfolios established (Health, Human Resources and Unity)
- Constituency: Sungai Rambai

Member of the Malacca State Legislative Assembly for Sungai Rambai
- In office 20 November 2021 – 14 November 2026
- Preceded by: Hasan Abd Rahman (BN–UMNO)
- Majority: 1,137 (2021)

Personal details
- Born: 7 September 1975 (age 51) Malacca, Malaysia
- Party: United Malays National Organisation (UMNO)
- Other political affiliations: Barisan Nasional (BN)

Siti Faizah binti Abdul Azis (born 7 September 1975) is a Malaysian politician who has served as the Deputy Member of the Malacca State Executive Council (EXCO) in the Barisan Nasional (BN) state administration under Chief Minister Ab Rauf Yusoh since April 2023 and Member of the Malacca State Legislative Assembly (MLA) for Sungai Rambai since November 2021. She is a member of the United Malays National Organisation (UMNO), a component party of the Barisan Nasional (BN) coalition.

== Political career ==
=== Candidate for the Malacca State Legislative Assembly (2021) ===
In the 2021 state election, Siti Faizah Abdul Azis made her electoral debut after being nominated by BN to contest for the Sungai Rambai state seat. Siti Faizah is contesting against Muhammad Jefri Safry of Perikatan Nasional, Farzana Hayani Mohd Nasir of Pakatan Harapan and Nazatul Asyraf Md Dom of Parti Bumiputera Perkasa Malaysia. She won the seat by gaining 3,170 votes with the majority of 1,825.

=== Deputy Member of the Malacca State Executive Council (since 2023) ===
On 6 April 2023, Siti Faizah Abdul Azis was appointed by Chief Minister Ab Rauf as Deputy EXCO Member in charge of Health, Human Resources and Unity, deputising for EXCO Member Ngwe Hee Sem.

== Election results ==
Malacca State Legislative Assembly
Year	Constituency	Candidate	Votes	Pct	Opponent(s)	Votes	Pct	Ballots cast	Majority	Turnout
2021	N28 Sungai Rambai	Siti Faizah Abdul Azis (UMNO)	3,801	48.08%	Muhammad Jefri Safry (BERSATU)	2,664	33.70%	8,112	1,137	68.53%
2021	N28 Sungai Rambai	Siti Faizah Abdul Azis (UMNO)	3,801	48.08%	Farzana Hayani Mohd Nasir (PKR)	1,356	17.15%	8,112	1,137	68.53%
2021	N28 Sungai Rambai	Siti Faizah Abdul Azis (UMNO)	3,801	48.08%	Nazatul Asyraf Md Dom (PUTRA)	84	1.06%	8,112	1,137	68.53%

== Honours ==
- Malacca
  - Lieutenant of the Exalted Order of Malacca (DPSM) – Datuk (2025)
  - Member of the Exalted Order of Malacca (DSM) (2017)
  - Recipient of the Distinguished Service Star (BCM) (2011)
  - Recipient of the Commendable Service Star (BKT) (2007)
  - Recipient of the Meritorious Service Medal (PJK) (2003)
