= Rosli Abdullah =

Malaysian politician

Yang Berhormat Datuk Rosli Abdullah DPSM MLA

Deputy Member of the Malacca State Executive Council
- In office 6 April 2023 – 14 November 2026 (Education, Higher Education and Religious Affairs)
- Governor: Mohd Ali Rustam
- Chief Minister: Ab Rauf Yusoh
- Member: Rahmad Mariman
- Preceded by: position established
- Constituency: Kuala Linggi

Member of the Malacca State Legislative Assembly for Kuala Linggi
- Incumbent
- Assumed office 20 November 2021
- Preceded by: Ismail Othman (BN–UMNO)
- Majority: 1,836 (2021); 4,883 (2026)

Personal details
- Born: Rosli bin Abdullah; 1968 (age 57–58) Malacca, Malaysia
- Party: United Malays National Organisation (UMNO)
- Other political affiliations: Barisan Nasional (BN)

Rosli bin Abdullah (born 1968) is a Malaysian politician who served as Deputy Member of the Malacca State Executive Council (EXCO) in the Barisan Nasional (BN) state administration under Chief Minister Ab Rauf Yusoh and Member Rahmad Mariman since April 2023. He has also served as Member of the Malacca State Legislative Assembly (MLA) for Kuala Linggi since November 2021.

== Political career ==
=== Candidate for the Malacca State Legislative Assembly (2021) ===
In the 2021 state election, Rosli Abdullah made his electoral debut after being nominated by BN to contest for the Kuala Linggi state seat. Rosli is contesting against Julasapiah Kasim of Pakatan Harapan, Aziah Mohd Sa'ad of Perikatan Nasional and Independent candidate Kamisan Palil. He won the seat by gaining 3,554 votes with the majority of 1,836.

=== Deputy Member of the Malacca State Executive Council (2023) ===
On 6 April 2023, Rosli Abdullah was appointed by Chief Minister Ab Rauf as Deputy EXCO Member in charge of Education, Higher Education and Religious Affairs, deputising for EXCO Member Rahmad Mariman.

== Election results ==
Malacca State Legislative Assembly
Year	Constituency	Candidate	Votes	Pct	Opponent(s)	Votes	Pct	Ballots cast	Majority	Turnout
2021	N01 Kuala Linggi	Rosli Abdullah (UMNO)	3,554	51.07%	Julasapiah Kasim (AMANAH)	1,718	24.70%	7,140	1,836	65.34%
2021	N01 Kuala Linggi	Rosli Abdullah (UMNO)	3,554	51.07%	Aziah Mohd Sa'ad (PAS)	1,645	23.64%	7,140	1,836	65.34%
2021	N01 Kuala Linggi	Rosli Abdullah (UMNO)	3,554	51.07%	Kamisan Palil (IND)	51	0.73%	7,140	1,836	65.34%
2026	N01 Kuala Linggi	Rosli Abdullah (UMNO)	7,760	70.06%	Muhammad Mukhlisul Mubin Julasapiah (AMANAH)	2,877	25.98%	11,076	4,883	72.12%
2026	N01 Kuala Linggi	Rosli Abdullah (UMNO)	7,760	70.06%	Nur Farhana Hamzah (BERSAMA)	439	3.96%	11,076	4,883	72.12%

== Honours ==
- Malacca
  - Lieutenant of the Exalted Order of Malacca (DPSM) – Datuk (2024)
