= Zulkiflee Mohd Zin =

Malaysian politician (born 1968)

Yang Berhormat Datuk Zulkiflee Mohd Zin DMSM BCM BKT PJK MLA

Deputy Member of the Malacca State Executive Council
- In office 6 April 2023 – 14 November 2026 (Housing, Local Government, Drainage, Climate Change and Disaster Management)
- Governor: Mohd Ali Rustam
- Chief Minister: Ab Rauf Yusoh
- Member: Rais Yasin
- Preceded by: Portfolios established (Drainage, Climate Change and Disaster Management)
- Constituency: Taboh Naning

Member of the Malacca State Legislative Assembly for Taboh Naning
- Incumbent
- Assumed office 20 November 2021
- Preceded by: Latipah Omar (BN–UMNO)
- Majority: 1,825 (2021); 5,027 (2026)

Personal details
- Born: 3 June 1968 (age 58) Malacca, Malaysia
- Party: United Malays National Organisation (UMNO)
- Other political affiliations: Barisan Nasional (BN)
- Parent: Mohd Zin Abdul Ghani (father)

Zulkiflee bin Mohd Zin (born 3 June 1968) is a Malaysian politician served as Deputy Member of the Malacca State Executive Council (EXCO) in the Barisan Nasional (BN) state administration under Chief Minister Ab Rauf Yusoh and Member Rais Yasin since April 2023. He has also served as Member of the Malacca State Legislative Assembly (MLA) for Taboh Naning since November 2021. He is the son of the former Chief Minister of Malacca Datuk Seri Mohd Zin Abdul Ghani.

== Political career ==
=== Candidate for the Malacca State Legislative Assembly (2021) ===
In the 2021 state election, Zulkiflee Mohd Zin made his electoral debut after being nominated by BN to contest for the Taboh Naning state seat. Zulkiflee is contesting against Abu Hashim Abdul of Perikatan Nasional and Zairi Suboh of Pakatan Harapan. He won the seat by gaining 3,170 votes with the majority of 1,825.

=== Deputy Member of the Malacca State Executive Council (since 2023) ===
On 6 April 2023, Zulkiflee Mohd Zin was appointed by Chief Minister Ab Rauf as Deputy EXCO Member in charge of Housing, Local Government, Drainage, Climate Change and Disaster Management, deputising for EXCO Member Rais Yasin.

== Election results ==
Malacca State Legislative Assembly
Year	Constituency	Candidate	Votes	Pct	Opponent(s)	Votes	Pct	Ballots cast	Majority	Turnout
2021	N05 Taboh Naning	Zulkiflee Mohd Zin (UMNO)	3,170	57.23%	Abu Hashim Abdul (PAS)	1,345	24.28%	5,660	1,825	65.35%
2021	N05 Taboh Naning	Zulkiflee Mohd Zin (UMNO)	3,170	57.23%	Zairi Suboh (AMANAH)	1,024	18.49%	5,660	1,825	65.35%
2026	N05 Taboh Naning	Zulkiflee Mohd Zin (UMNO)	6,470	81.76%	Junainah Sahat (AMANAH)	1,443	18.24%	7,913	5,027	71.18%

== Honours ==
- Malacca
  - Companion of the Exalted Order of Malacca (DMSM) – Datuk (2023)
  - Recipient of the Distinguished Service Star (BCM) (2020)
  - Recipient of the Commendable Service Star (BKT) (2009)
  - Recipient of the Meritorious Service Medal (PJK) (2005)
