= Tuminah Kadi =

Malaysian politician (born 1967)

Yang Berhormat Datuk Tuminah Kadi DPSM PJK MLA

Deputy Member of the Malacca State Executive Council
- In office 6 April 2023 – 14 November 2026 (Entrepreneur Development, Cooperatives and Consumer Affairs)
- Governor: Mohd Ali Rustam
- Chief Minister: Ab Rauf Yusoh
- Member: Allex Seah Shoo Chin
- Preceded by: Portfolios established (Entrepreneur Development, Cooperatives and Consumer Affairs)
- Constituency: Pantai Kundor

Member of the Malacca State Legislative Assembly for Pantai Kundor
- Incumbent
- Assumed office 20 November 2021
- Preceded by: Nor Azman Hassan (BN–UMNO)
- Majority: 827 (2021); 2,752 (2026)

Personal details
- Born: 8 July 1967 (age 59) Malacca, Malaysia
- Party: United Malays National Organisation (UMNO)
- Other political affiliations: Barisan Nasional (BN)

Tuminah binti Kadi (born 8 July 1967) is a Malaysian politician who has served as the Deputy Member of the Malacca State Executive Council (EXCO) in the Barisan Nasional (BN) state administration under Chief Minister Ab Rauf Yusoh since April 2023 and Member of the Malacca State Legislative Assembly (MLA) for Pantai Kundor since November 2021. She is a member of the United Malays National Organisation (UMNO), a component party of the Barisan Nasional (BN) coalition.

== Political career ==
=== Candidate for the Malacca State Legislative Assembly (2021) ===
In the 2021 state election, Tuminah Kadi made her electoral debut after being nominated by BN to contest for the Pantai Kundor state seat. Siti Faizah is contesting against Mohamad Ridzwan Mustafa of Perikatan Nasional and Nor Azman Hassan of Pakatan Harapan. She won the seat by gaining 3,170 votes with the slim majority of 827.

=== Deputy Member of the Malacca State Executive Council (since 2023) ===
On 6 April 2023, Tuminah Kadi was appointed by Chief Minister Ab Rauf as Deputy EXCO Member in charge of Entrepreneur Development, Cooperatives and Consumer Affairs, deputising for EXCO Member Allex Seah Shoo Chin.

== Election results ==
Malacca State Legislative Assembly
Year	Constituency	Candidate	Votes	Pct	Opponent(s)	Votes	Pct	Ballots cast	Majority	Turnout
2021	N12 Pantai Kundor	Tuminah Kadi (UMNO)	3,960	40.03%	Mohamad Ridzwan Mustafa (BERSATU)	3,133	31.67%	10,072	827	65.11%
2021	N12 Pantai Kundor	Tuminah Kadi (UMNO)	3,960	40.03%	Nor Azman Hassan (AMANAH)	2,799	28.30%	10,072	827	65.11%
2026	N12 Pantai Kundor	Tuminah Kadi (UMNO)	8,864	59.19%	Asmah Samat (BERSATU)	6,112	40.81%	14,976	2,752	72.69%

== Honours ==
- Malacca
  - Lieutenant of the Exalted Order of Malacca (DPSM) – Datuk (2025)
  - Recipient of the Meritorious Service Medal (PJK) (2012)
