= Seri Negeri complex =

Government building in Malacca, Malaysia

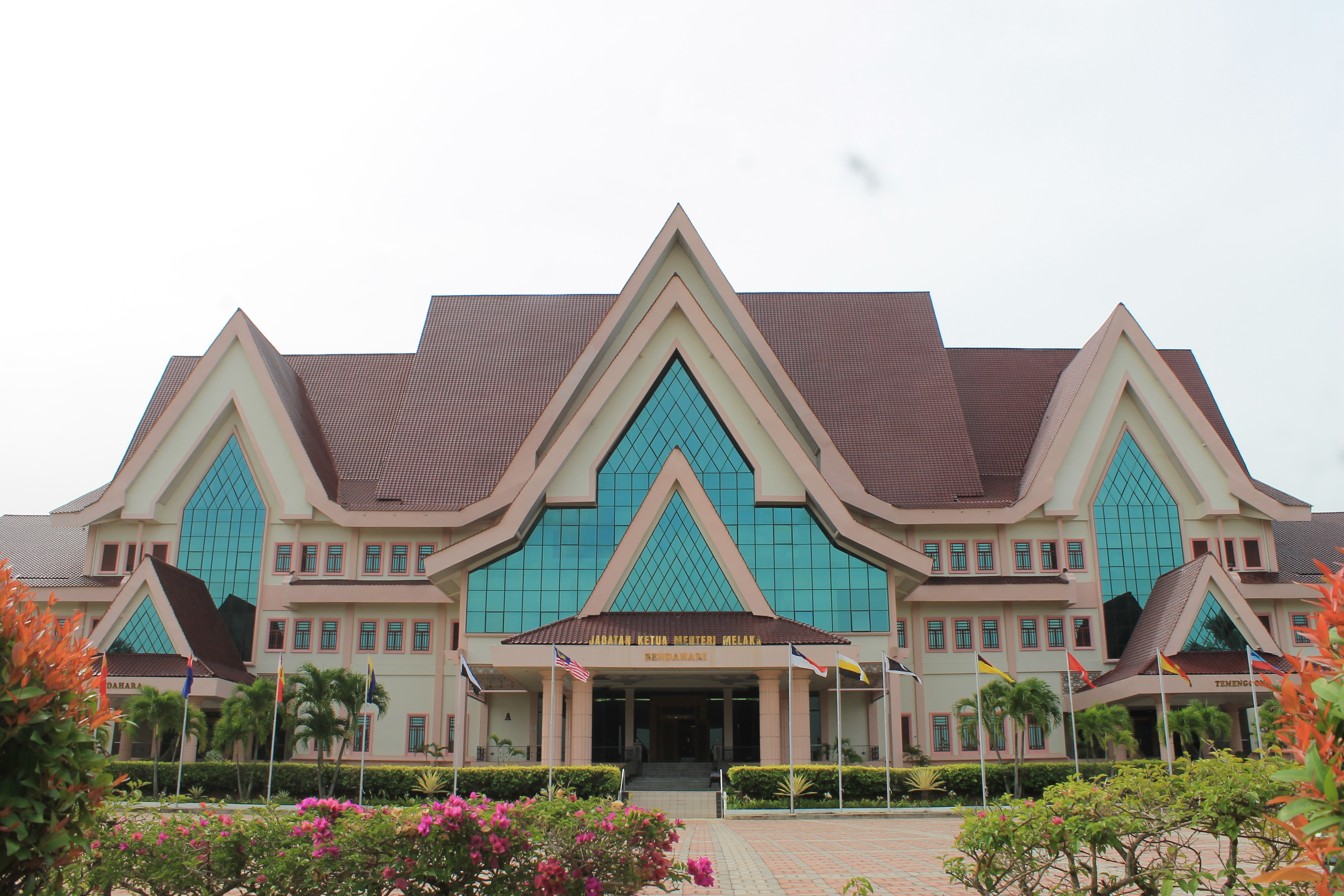
- The building which houses the chief minister office
- Interactive map of the Seri Negeri complex area

General information
- Status: Completed
- Type: State government administrative offices and legislative building
- Location: Ayer Keroh, Malacca, Malaysia
- Coordinates: 2°16′7″N 102°18′0″E
- Owner: Malacca state government

Seri Negeri complex (Malay: Kompleks Seri Negeri) is a state secretariat building complex located in Ayer Keroh, Malacca, Malaysia. It houses the offices of the chief minister (Block Bendahara), cabinet ministers, speaker of the state assembly (Block Laksamana), state assembly hall (Block Laksamana) and the official residence of the State Governor (Yang di-Pertua Negeri), which were previously scattered around Malacca City centre.

== See also ==
- List of Yang di-Pertua Negeri of Malacca
- Malacca State Legislative Assembly
- Malacca State Executive Council
