= Rim (state constituency) =

Electoral district in Malacca, Malaysia

Rim (N25)
Malacca constituency

State constituency
- Legislature: Malacca State Legislative Assembly
MLA
Khaidirah Abu Zahar
BN
- Constituency created: 1959
- Constituency abolished: 1974
- Constituency re-created: 1984
- First contested: 1959
- Last contested: 2026

Demographics
- Electors (2026): 17,742

N25 Rim within Malacca, as used for the 2021 state election

Rim is a state constituency in Malacca, Malaysia, that has been represented in the Melaka State Legislative Assembly.

== Demographics ==
Ethnic breakdown of Rim's electorate as of 2026
1. Malay (67.2%)
2. Chinese (18.0%)
3. Indian (13.2%)
4. Other ethnicities (1.60%)

== History ==
=== Polling districts ===
According to the gazette issued on 5 November 2026, the Rim constituency has a total of 10 polling districts.

State constituency	Polling districts	Code	Location
Rim (N25)	Kemendor	139/25/01	SK Kemendor
Rim (N25)	Seri Kesang	139/25/02	Balai Raya Seri Kesang
Rim (N25)	Kelubi	139/25/03	SK Sri Lanang
Rim (N25)	Kg Rim	139/25/04	SMK Iskandar Shah
Rim (N25)	Bukit Katong	139/25/05	SJK (C) Pay Chuin
Rim (N25)	Ladang Diamond	139/25/06	SJK (T) Ladang Diamond Jubile
Rim (N25)	Simpang Bekoh	139/25/07	SMK Simpang Bekoh
Rim (N25)	Chohong	139/25/08	SK Chohong
Rim (N25)	Chinchin	139/25/09	SK Chinchin
Rim (N25)	Simpang Kerayong	139/25/10	MRSM Tun Ghafar Baba

=== Representation history ===
Members of the Legislative Assembly for Rim
Assembly	No	Years	Name	Party
Constituency created
1st	N17	1959-1964	Tan Nai Kwi	Alliance (MCA)
2nd	N17	1964-1969	Tan Nai Kwi	Alliance (MCA)
		1969-1971	Assembly dissolved	
3rd	N17	1969-1974	Mohamed Jiddi Abdullah	Alliance (UMNO)
Constituency abolished and renamed as Nyalas, split into Ayer Panas and Batang Melaka
Constituency recreated from Nyalas, Batang Melaka and Ayer Panas
7th	N19	1986-1990	Jaafar Lajis	BN (UMNO)
8th	N19	1990-1995	Jaafar Lajis	BN (UMNO)
9th	N22	1995-1999	Dolah Atan	BN (UMNO)
10th	N22	1999-2004	Ramlah Abas	BN (UMNO)
11th	N25	2004-2008	Ramlah Abas	BN (UMNO)
12th	N25	2008-2013	Yazed Khamis	BN (UMNO)
13th	N25	2013-2018	Ghazale Muhamad	BN (UMNO)
14th	N25	2018-2021	Ghazale Muhamad	BN (UMNO)
15th	N25	2021-2026	Khaidiriah Abu Zahar	BN (UMNO)
16th	N25	2026 – present	Khaidiriah Abu Zahar	BN (UMNO)

== Election results ==
Malacca state election, 2026
Party	Candidate	Votes	%	∆%
BN	Khaidirah Abu Zahar	9,847	78.13	▲32.82
PH	Esma Eazreen Husin	2,757	21.87	▼2.41
Total valid votes		12,604		
Total rejected ballots		127		
Unreturned ballots		0		
Turnout		12,731	71.76	▲5.33
Registered electors		17,742		
Majority		7,090	56.26	▲41.37
BN hold		Swing		
Source(s) https://electiondata.my/elections/mlk/SE-16/

Malacca state election, 2021
Party	Candidate	Votes	%	∆%
BN	Khaidiriah Abu Zahar	4,037	45.31	▼1.49
PN	Azalina Abdul Rahman	2,710	30.42	▲30.42
PH	Prasanth Kumar Brakasam	2,163	24.28	▲24.28
Total valid votes		8,910	100.00	
Total rejected ballots		143		
Unreturned ballots		29		
Turnout		9,082	66.43	▼17.76
Registered electors		13,672		
Majority		1,327	14.89	▲10.16
BN hold		Swing		
Source(s) https://lom.agc.gov.my/ilims/upload/portal/akta/outputp/1715764/PUB%20583.pdf

Malacca state election, 2018
Party	Candidate	Votes	%	∆%
BN	Ghazale Muhamad	5,301	46.80	▼9.78
PKR	Shamsul Iskandar @ Yusre Mohd Akin	4,765	42.06	▼1.36
PAS	Kintan Man	1,262	11.14	▲11.14
Total valid votes		11,328	100.00	
Total rejected ballots		164		
Unreturned ballots		33		
Turnout		11,525	84.19	▼2.26
Registered electors		13,689		
Majority		536	4.73	▼8.42
BN hold		Swing		
Source(s) "14th General Election Malaysia (GE14 / PRU14) - Malacca". The Star.

Malacca state election, 2013
Party	Candidate	Votes	%	∆%
BN	Ghazale Muhamad	4,821	56.58	▼5.12
PKR	Azmi Kamis	3,700	43.42	▲5.12
Total valid votes		8,521	100.00	
Total rejected ballots		157		
Unreturned ballots		18		
Turnout		8,696	86.45	▲9.51
Registered electors		10,059		
Majority		1,121	13.16	▼10.25
BN hold		Swing		

Malacca state election, 2008
Party	Candidate	Votes	%	∆%
BN	Mohd Yazed Khamis	4,316	61.70	▼17.09
PKR	Azmi Kamis	2,679	38.30	▲38.30
Total valid votes		6,995	100.00	
Total rejected ballots		139		
Unreturned ballots		12		
Turnout		7,146	76.94	▲1.20
Registered electors		9,288		
Majority		1,637	23.40	▼34.18
BN hold		Swing		

Malacca state election, 2004
Party	Candidate	Votes	%	∆%
BN	Ramlah binti Abas	5,405	78.79	▲12.39
PAS	Mohd Aris Omar	1,455	21.21	▲21.21
Total valid votes		6,860	100.00	
Total rejected ballots		167		
Unreturned ballots		5		
Turnout		7,032	75.74	▼8.50
Registered electors		9,285		
Majority		3,950	57.58	▲24.78
BN hold		Swing		

Malacca state election, 1999
Party	Candidate	Votes	%	∆%
BN	Ramlah binti Abas	3,980	66.40	▼19.04
PKR	Zulkefly Othman	2,014	33.60	▲33.60
Total valid votes		5,994	100.00	
Total rejected ballots		147		
Unreturned ballots		5		
Turnout		6,146	84.24	▲8.65
Registered electors		7,296		
Majority		1,966	32.80	▼45.17
BN hold		Swing		

Malacca state election, 1995
Party	Candidate	Votes	%	∆%
BN	Dolah Atan	4,778	85.44	▲10.72
PAS	Md. Dzaid Ismail	418	7.47	▲7.47
S46	Md. Yasin Md Som	396	7.08	▼18.19
Total valid votes		5,592	100.00	
Total rejected ballots		142		
Unreturned ballots		6		
Turnout		5,740	75.59	▼2.68
Registered electors		7,594		
Majority		4,360	77.97	▲28.51
BN hold		Swing		

Malacca state election, 1990
Party	Candidate	Votes	%	∆%
BN	Jaafar Lajis	3,835	74.73	▼7.68
S46	Md. Shah Sahamin	1,297	25.27	▲25.27
Total valid votes		5,132	100.00	
Total rejected ballots		165		
Unreturned ballots		8		
Turnout		5,305	78.27	▲7.07
Registered electors		6,778		
Majority		2,538	49.45	▼15.35
BN hold		Swing		

Malacca state election, 1986
Party	Candidate	Votes	%	∆%
BN	Jaafar Lajis	3,732	82.40	
PAS	Tompang Saadan	797	17.60	
Total valid votes		4,529	100.00	
Total rejected ballots		189		
Unreturned ballots		0		
Turnout		4,718	71.19	
Registered electors		6,627		
Majority		2,935	64.80	
BN hold		Swing		

Malacca state election, 1969
Party	Candidate	Votes	%	∆%
Alliance	Mohamed Juddi Abdullah	3,127	55.96	▲55.96
PMIP	Alias Sijak	1,180	21.12	▲21.12
Parti Sosialis Rakyat Malaysia	Minhad Maludin	728	13.03	▲13.03
Independent	Gan Hong Hui	553	9.90	▲9.90
Total valid votes		5,588	100.00	
Total rejected ballots		97		
Unreturned ballots		0		
Turnout		5,685	76.19	▼8.11
Registered electors		7,462		
Majority		1,947	34.84	▼13.67
Alliance hold		Swing		

Malacca state election, 1964
Party	Candidate	Votes	%	∆%
Alliance	Tan Nai Kwi	4,007	74.26	▼9.99
Socialist Front	Too Yeng Jong	1,389	25.74	▲25.74
Total valid votes		5,396	100.00	
Total rejected ballots		181		
Unreturned ballots		0		
Turnout		5,577	84.30	▼0.23
Registered electors		6,616		
Majority		2,618	48.52	▼19.98
Alliance hold		Swing		

Malacca state election, 1959
Party	Candidate	Votes	%
Alliance	Tan Nai Kwi	3,536	84.25
PMIP	Md. Nor A. Latif	661	15.75
Total valid votes		4,197	100.00
Total rejected ballots		117	
Unreturned ballots		0	
Turnout		4,314	84.52
Registered electors		5,104	
Majority		2,875	68.50
This was a new constituency created.
