= Sulaiman Md Ali =

Malaysian politician (born 1965)

Yang Berbahagia Datuk Seri Utama Sulaiman Md Ali DUNM DMSM KMN PPN BKT PJK
- سليمان مد علي

12th Chief Minister of Malacca
- In office 9 March 2020 – 31 March 2023
- Governor: Mohd Khalil Yaakob (2020); Mohd Ali Rustam (2020–2023)
- Preceded by: Adly Zahari
- Succeeded by: Ab Rauf Yusoh
- Constituency: Lendu

Deputy Member of the Malacca State Executive Council (Finance, Lands, Economic Planning, Investment, Religious Affairs, Heritage, Youth and Tourism)
- In office 13 May 2013 – 11 May 2018 Serving with: Ghazale Muhamad &; Norpipah Abdol
- Governor: Mohd Khalil Yaakob
- Chief Minister: Idris Haron
- Member: Idris Haron
- Preceded by: Ismail Othman (Finance, Lands and Economic Planning); Amiruddin Yusop (Investment); Mohd Yazed Khamis (Religious Affairs); Chua Kheng Hwa (Heritage and Tourism); Ab Rahman Ab Karim (Youth)
- Succeeded by: Position abolished
- Constituency: Lendu

Member of the Malacca State Legislative Assembly for Lendu
- In office 5 May 2013 – 14 November 2026
- Preceded by: Idderis Kassim; (BN–UMNO)
- Succeeded by: Abdul Hakim Abdul Wahid (BN–UMNO)
- Majority: 2,503 (2013); 627 (2018); 3,104 (2021)

Faction represented in the Malacca State Legislative Assembly
- 2013–2026: Barisan Nasional

Personal details
- Born: Sulaiman bin Md Ali; 20 December 1965 (age 60) Kampung Durian Daun, Masjid Tanah, Malacca, Malaysia
- Citizenship: Malaysia
- Party: United Malays National Organisation (UMNO)
- Other political affiliations: Barisan Nasional (BN)
- Spouse: Munira M Yusop
- Children: 3
- Occupation: Politician

Sulaiman bin Md Ali (Jawi: سليمان بن مد علي; born 20 December 1965) is a Malaysian politician who has served as Member of the Malacca State Legislative Assembly (MLA) for Lendu from May 2013 until November 2026. He served as the 12th Chief Minister of Malacca from March 2020 to his resignation in March 2023, Deputy Member of the Malacca State Executive Council (EXCO) in the Barisan Nasional (BN) state administration under former Chief Minister and former Member Idris Haron from May 2013 to the collapse of the BN state administration in May 2018. He is a member and Division Deputy Chief of Masjid Tanah of the United Malays National Organisation (UMNO), a component party of the BN coalition.

== Political career ==
=== Chief Minister of Malacca (2020–2023) ===
==== Attempt to overthrow him and 2021 Malacca state election ====
On 4 October 2021, former Chief Minister of Malacca and Sungai Udang MLA Idris Haron and three other MLAs declared loss of confidence and support for him as Chief Minister and claimed that the state government had therefore collapsed. However, the state government remained in office as the Sulaiman did not resign as chief minister and lose the vote of a motion of confidence in the state legislative assembly. Following this, the Malacca State Legislative Assembly was instead dissolved the same day following his loss of majority support in the assembly and his state government stayed in power in caretaker capacity before the next state government was formed after the 2021 Malacca state election on 20 November 2021. In the election, Barisan Nasional (BN) gained a landslide victory and two-thirds majority in the assembly by winning 21 out of 28 state seats, he remained as chief minister in the new government. The next day, Sulaiman was sworn in as chief minister.

==== Resignation ====
On 29 March 2023, Deputy Prime Minister and BN Chairman Ahmad Zahid Hamidi confirmed that Sulaiman had tendered his resignation letter to the Yang di-Pertua Negeri of Melaka Mohd Ali Rustam and informed him of his intention to resign as the Chief Minister of Malacca. On 30 March 2023, Ahmad Zahid nominated Ab Rauf Yusoh, the State Chairman of BN of Malacca and MLA for Tanjung Bidara as his successor. On 31 March 2023, Ab Rauf was sworn in and appointed as the new and 13th Chief Minister.

== Personal life & education ==
Sulaiman Md. Ali is married to Munira M Yusop and has 3 children. Sulaiman received his primary and secondary school education in both Sekolah Kebangsaan Durian Daun as well as Sekolah Menengah Kebangsaan Masjid Tanah. He was a training cadet in Malaysian Maritime Academy and holds a professional master's degree in management (Quality Assurance Commission) from the United Kingdom.

== Election results ==
Malacca State Legislative Assembly
Year	Constituency	Candidate	Votes	Pct	Opponent(s)	Votes	Pct	Ballots cast	Majority	Turnout
2013	N04 Lendu	Sulaiman Md Ali (UMNO)	5,009	66.65%	Asri Shaik Abdul Aziz (PAS)	2,506	33.35%	7,613	2,503	86.04%
2018	N04 Lendu	Sulaiman Md Ali (UMNO)	4,016	46.87%	Ridhuan Affandi Abu Bakar (BERSATU)	3,389	39.56%	8,701	627	84.07%
2018	N04 Lendu	Sulaiman Md Ali (UMNO)	4,016	46.87%	Arshad Mohamad Som (PAS)	1,163	13.57%	8,701	627	84.07%
2021	N04 Lendu	Sulaiman Md Ali (UMNO)	4,486	63.88%	Abdullah Mahadi (BERSATU)	1,382	19.68%	7,023	3,104	66.50%
2021	N04 Lendu	Sulaiman Md Ali (UMNO)	4,486	63.88%	Mohamad Asri Ibrahim (PKR)	1,155	16.45%	7,023	3,104	66.50%

== Honours ==
=== Honours of Malaysia ===
- Malaysia
  - Officer of the Order of the Defender of the Realm (KMN) (2012)
  - Medal of the Order of the Defender of the Realm (PPN) (2002)
- Malacca
  - Knight Grand Commander of the Premier and Exalted Order of Malacca (DUNM) – Datuk Seri Utama (2020)
  - Companion of the Exalted Order of Malacca (DMSM) – Datuk (2015)
  - Member of the Exalted Order of Malacca (DSM) (2014)
  - Recipient of the Commendable Service Star (BKT) (2012)
  - Recipient of the Meritorious Service Medal (PJK) (2002)

Political offices
Preceded by Adly Zahari	12th Chief Minister of Malacca; 2020–2023	Succeeded by Ab Rauf Yusoh
