= Tanjung Bidara (state constituency) =

Tanjung Bidara (N02)
Malacca constituency

State constituency
- Legislature: Malacca State Legislative Assembly
MLA
Ab Rauf Yusoh
BN
- Constituency created: 2004
- First contested: 2004
- Last contested: 2026

Demographics
- Electors (2026): 15,003

N02 Tanjung Bidara within Malacca, as used for the 2021 state election

Tanjung Bidara is a state constituency in Malacca, Malaysia, that has been represented in the Malacca State Legislative Assembly. It has been represented by Chief Minister Ab Rauf Yusoh of Barisan Nasional (BN) since 2021.

The state constituency was first contested in 2004 and is mandated to return a single Assemblyman to the Melaka State Legislative Assembly under the first-past-the-post voting system.

== Definition ==
The Tanjung Bidara constituency contains the polling districts of Kampung Pulau, Lubok Redan, Sungai Baru Tengah, Pengkalan Balak and Pasir Gembor.

== Demographics ==
Ethnic breakdown of Tanjung Bidara's electorate as of 2026
1. Malays (92.8%)
2. Chinese (4.20%)
3. Indians (1.90%)
4. Other Ethnicities (1.20%)

== History ==
According to the gazette issued on 5 November 2026, the Tanjung Bidara constituency has a total of 5 polling districts.

State constituency	Polling districts	Code	Location
Tanjung Bidara (N02)	Kampung Pulau	134/02/01	SK Jeram
Tanjung Bidara (N02)	Lubok Redan	134/02/02	SK Lubok Redan
Tanjung Bidara (N02)	Sungai Baru Tengah	134/02/03	Kolej Matrikulasi Melaka
Tanjung Bidara (N02)	Pengkalan Balak	134/02/04	SK Pengkalan Balak
Tanjung Bidara (N02)	Pasir Gembor	134/02/05	SK Tanjong Bidara

=== Representation history ===
Members of the Legislative Assembly for Tanjung Bidara
Assembly	No	Years	Member	Party
Constituency created from Kuala Linggi, Ramuan China and Masjid Tanah
11th	N02	2004 – 2008	Abdul Karim Sulaiman	BN (UMNO)
12th	N02	2008 – 2013	Abdul Karim Sulaiman	BN (UMNO)
13th	N02	2013 – 2018	Md Rawi Mahmud	BN (UMNO)
14th	N02	2018 – 2021	Md Rawi Mahmud	BN (UMNO)
15th	N02	2021 – 2026	Ab Rauf Yusoh	BN (UMNO)
16th	N02	2026 – present	Ab Rauf Yusoh	BN (UMNO)

== Election results ==
Malacca state election, 2026
Party	Candidate	Votes	%	∆%
BN	Ab Rauf Yusoh	10,079	87.32	▲38.18
PH	Mohd Yunazri Mustamiri	1,464	12.68	▲5.93
Total valid votes		11,543	100.00	
Total rejected ballots		82		
Unreturned ballots		13		
Turnout		11,638	77.57	▲4.79
Registered electors		15,003		
Majority		8,615	74.63	▲69.00
BN hold		Swing		
Source(s) https://electiondata.my/elections/mlk/SE-16/

Malacca state election, 2021
Party	Candidate	Votes	%	∆%
BN	Ab Rauf Yusoh	3,559	49.14	▼9.01
PN	Mas Ermieyati Samsudin	3,195	44.11	▲44.11
PH	Zainal Hassan	489	6.75	▼17.16
Total valid votes		7,243	100.00	
Total rejected ballots		77		
Unreturned ballots		24		
Turnout		7,344	72.78	▼11.65
Registered electors		10,133		
Majority		364	5.03	▼29.21
BN hold		Swing		
Source(s) https://lom.agc.gov.my/ilims/upload/portal/akta/outputp/1715764/PUB%20583.pdf

Malacca state election, 2018
Party	Candidate	Votes	%	∆%
BN	Md Rawi Mahmud	4,865	58.15	▼19.27
PKR	Halim Bachik	2,001	23.91	▲23.91
PAS	Imran Abdul Rahman	1,501	17.94	▼4.64
Total valid votes		8,367	100.00	
Total rejected ballots		116		
Unreturned ballots		38		
Turnout		8,521	84.43	▼3.74
Registered electors		10,092		
Majority		2,864	34.24	▼20.61
BN hold		Swing		

Malacca state election, 2013
Party	Candidate	Votes	%	∆%
BN	Md Rawi Mahmud	6,014	77.22	▼0.20
PAS	Imran Abdul Rahman	1,774	22.78	▲0.20
Total valid votes		7,788	100.00	
Total rejected ballots		101		
Unreturned ballots		0		
Turnout		7,889	87.58	▲6.89
Registered electors		9,008		
Majority		4,240	54.44	▼0.40
BN hold		Swing		
Source(s) "Federal Government Gazette - Notice of Contested Election, State Legislative Assembly for the State of Selangor [P.U. (B) 192/2013]" (PDF). Attorney General's Chambers of Malaysia. 26 April 2013. Archived from the original (PDF) on 2019-12-29. "Federal Government Gazette - Results of Contested Election and Statements of the Poll after the Official Addition of Votes, State Constituencies for the State of Selangor [P.U. (B) 233/2013]". Attorney General's Chambers of Malaysia. 22 May 2013. Archived from the original (PDF) on 2018-10-02.

Malacca state election, 2008
Party	Candidate	Votes	%	∆%
BN	Abdul Karim Sulaiman	4,664	77.42	▼1.27
PAS	Imran Abdul Rahman	1,360	22.58	▲1.27
Total valid votes		6,024	100.00	
Total rejected ballots		103		
Unreturned ballots		16		
Turnout		6,143	80.69	▼0.81
Registered electors		7,613		
Majority		3,304	54.84	▼2.54
BN hold		Swing		

Malacca state election, 2004
Party	Candidate	Votes	%
BN	Abdul Karim Sulaiman	4,480	78.69
PAS	Abdul Ghani Abdul Rahman	1,213	21.31
Total valid votes		5,693	100.00
Total rejected ballots		90	
Unreturned ballots		0	
Turnout		5,783	81.50
Registered electors		7,096	
Majority		3,267	57.38
This was a new seat created.

== Sources ==
- "Keputusan Pilihan Raya Suruhanjaya Pilihan Raya". Election Commission of Malaysia. Archived from the original on 2016-04-24.
