= Sungai Rambai (state constituency) =

Political subdivision in Malaysia

Sungai Rambai (N28)
Malacca constituency

State constituency
- Legislature: Malacca State Legislative Assembly
MLA
Jezlee Pit
BN
- Constituency created: 1959
- First contested: 1959
- Last contested: 2026

Demographics
- Electors (2026): 16,043

N28 Sungai Rambai within Malacca, as used for the 2021 state election

Sungai Rambai is a state constituency in Malacca, Malaysia, that has been represented in the Melaka State Legislative Assembly.

== Demographics ==
Ethnic breakdown of Sungai Rambai's electorate as of 2026
1. Malays (85.3%)
2. Chinese (12.1%)
3. Indians (2.00%)
4. Other Ethnicities (0.60%)

== History ==
=== Polling districts ===
According to the gazette issued on 5 November 2026, the Sungai Rambai constituency has a total of 5 polling districts.

State constituency	Polling districts	Code	Location
Sungai Rambai (N28)	Seri Mendapat	139/28/01	SK Seri Mendapat
Sungai Rambai (N28)	Batu Gajah	139/28/02	SK Batu Gajah
Sungai Rambai (N28)	Sebatu	139/28/03	SK Sebatu
Sungai Rambai (N28)	Parit Putat	139/28/04	SMK Sungai Rambai
Sungai Rambai (N28)	Parit Perawas	139/28/05	SK Parit Penghulu

=== Representation history ===
Members of the Legislative Assembly for Sungai Rambai
Assembly	No	Years	Member	Party
Constituency created
Sungei Rambai
1st	N20	1959 - 1964	Ibrahim Abdul Hamid	Alliance (UMNO)
2nd	N20	1964 - 1969	Ibrahim Abdul Hamid	Alliance (UMNO)
		1969 - 1971	Assembly dissolved	
3rd	N20	1971 - 1973	Ahmad Dahlan Salleh	Alliance (UMNO)
3rd	N20	1973 - 1974	Ahmad Dahlan Salleh	Alliance (UMNO)
4th	N10	1974 - 1978	Ahmad Dahlan Salleh	BN (UMNO)
5th	N10	1978 - 1982	Ahmad Dahlan Salleh	BN (UMNO)
6th	N10	1982 - 1986	Abu Zahar Ithnin	BN (UMNO)
Sungai Rambai
7th	N20	1986 - 1990	Abu Zahar Ithnin	BN (UMNO)
8th	N20	1990 - 1995	Abu Zahar Ithnin	BN (UMNO)
9th	N25	1995 - 1999	Abdul Azis Abdul Ghani	BN (UMNO)
10th	N25	1999 - 2004	Abdul Azis Abdul Ghani	BN (UMNO)
11th	N28	2004 – 2008	Abu Pit	BN (UMNO)
12th	N28	2008 – 2013	Hasan Abd Rahman	BN (UMNO)
13th	N28	2013 – 2018	Hasan Abd Rahman	BN (UMNO)
14th	N28	2018 – 2021	Hasan Abd Rahman	BN (UMNO)
15th	N28	2021 – 2026	Siti Faizah Abdul Azis	BN (UMNO)
16th	N28	2026 – present	Jezlee Pit	BN (UMNO)

== Election results ==
Malacca state election, 2026
Party	Candidate	Votes	%	∆%
BN	Jezlee Pit	9,610	78.72	▲30.64
PH	Aminuddin Abdul Jalil	2,112	17.30	▲0.15
Independent	Noorizan Jantan	486	3.98	▲3.98
Total valid votes		12,208		
Total rejected ballots		98		
Unreturned ballots		9		
Turnout		12,315	76.76	▲8.23
Registered electors		16,043		
Majority		7,498	61.42	▲47.04
BN hold		Swing		
Source(s) https://electiondata.my/elections/mlk/SE-16/

Malacca state election, 2021
Party	Candidate	Votes	%	∆%
BN	Siti Faizah Abdul Aziz	3,801	48.08	▼3.25
PN	Muhammad Jefri Safry	2,664	33.70	▲33.70
PH	Farzana Hayani Mohd Nasir	1,356	17.15	▲17.15
PUTRA	Nazatul Asyraf Md Dom	84	1.06	▲1.06
Total valid votes		7,905	100.00	
Total rejected ballots		189		
Unreturned ballots		18		
Turnout		8,112	68.53	▼17.24
Registered electors		11,837		
Majority		1,137	14.38	▼2.45
BN hold		Swing		
Source(s) https://lom.agc.gov.my/ilims/upload/portal/akta/outputp/1715764/PUB%20583.pdf

Malacca state election, 2018
Party	Candidate	Votes	%	∆%
BN	Hasan Abd Rahman	5,088	51.33	▼11.72
PKR	Azalina Abdul Rahman	3,419	34.49	▲34.49
PAS	Zakariya Kasnin	1,405	14.17	▼22.78
Total valid votes		9,912	100.00	
Total rejected ballots		168		
Unreturned ballots		34		
Turnout		10,114	85.77	▼2.65
Registered electors		11,792		
Majority		1,669	16.84	▼9.26
BN hold		Swing		

Malacca state election, 2013
Party	Candidate	Votes	%	∆%
BN	Hasan Abd Rahman	5,709	63.05	▼2.10
PAS	Kintan Man	3,346	36.95	▲2.10
Total valid votes		9,055	100.00	
Total rejected ballots		142		
Unreturned ballots		29		
Turnout		9,226	88.42	▲5.48
Registered electors		10,434		
Majority		2,363	26.10	▼4.21
BN hold		Swing		

Malacca state election, 2008
Party	Candidate	Votes	%	∆%
BN	Hasan Abd Rahman	4,872	65.15	▼6.69
PAS	Aminuddin Abdul Jalil	2,606	34.85	▲6.69
Total valid votes		7,478	100.00	
Total rejected ballots		131		
Unreturned ballots		7		
Turnout		7,616	82.94	▲0.59
Registered electors		9,182		
Majority		2,266	30.30	▼13.38
BN hold		Swing		

Malacca state election, 2004
Party	Candidate	Votes	%	∆%
BN	Abu Pit	5,046	71.84	▲11.76
PAS	Azutdin Hasan	1,978	28.16	▼11.76
Total valid votes		7,024	100.00	
Total rejected ballots		181		
Unreturned ballots		2		
Turnout		7,207	82.36	▲4.39
Registered electors		8,751		
Majority		3,068	43.68	▲23.52
BN hold		Swing		

Malacca state election, 1999
Party	Candidate	Votes	%	∆%
BN	Abdul Azis Abdul Ghani	4,042	60.08	▼21.87
PAS	Azutdin Hasan	2,686	39.92	▲21.87
Total valid votes		6,728	100.00	
Total rejected ballots		171		
Unreturned ballots		10		
Turnout		6,909	77.97	▲1.71
Registered electors		8,861		
Majority		1,356	20.15	▼43.74
BN hold		Swing		

Malacca state election, 1995
Party	Candidate	Votes	%	∆%
BN	Abdul Azis Abdul Ghani	5,134	81.95	▲11.00
PAS	Ismail Jaafar	1,131	18.05	▲18.05
Total valid votes		6,265	100.00	
Total rejected ballots		146		
Unreturned ballots		12		
Turnout		6,423	76.26	▼2.91
Registered electors		8,422		
Majority		4,003	63.89	▲21.99
BN hold		Swing		

Malacca state election, 1990
Party	Candidate	Votes	%	∆%
BN	Abu Zahar Isnin	5,022	70.95	▲0.27
S46	Abu Samah Ahmad	2,056	29.05	▲29.05
Total valid votes		7,078	100.00	
Total rejected ballots		298		
Unreturned ballots		24		
Turnout		7,400	79.18	▲8.45
Registered electors		9,346		
Majority		2,966	41.90	▲0.54
BN hold		Swing		

Malacca state election, 1986
Party	Candidate	Votes	%	∆%
BN	Abu Zahar Isnin	4,168	70.68	▼13.84
PAS	Rahimi Bani	1,729	29.32	▲13.84
Total valid votes		5,897	100.00	
Total rejected ballots		307		
Unreturned ballots		0		
Turnout		6,204	70.73	▼4.79
Registered electors		8,772		
Majority		2,439	41.36	▼27.68
BN hold		Swing		

Malacca state election, 1982: Sungei Rambai
Party	Candidate	Votes	%	∆%
BN	Ahmad Ithnin	5,083	84.52	▲22.78
PAS	Mohd. Yatim Abd. Wahab	931	15.48	▲1.47
Total valid votes		6,014	100.00	
Total rejected ballots		208		
Unreturned ballots		0		
Turnout		6,222	75.52	▼2.76
Registered electors		8,239		
Majority		4,152	69.04	▲31.56
BN hold		Swing		

Malacca state election, 1978: Sungei Rambai
Party	Candidate	Votes	%	∆%
BN	Ahmad Dahlan Salleh	3,288	61.73	▼5.71
DAP	Abdul Karim Abu	1,292	24.26	▲24.26
PAS	Jaliluddin Abd. Wahid	746	14.01	▲14.01
Total valid votes		5,326	100.00	
Total rejected ballots		280		
Unreturned ballots		0		
Turnout		5,606	78.27	▲0.09
Registered electors		7,162		
Majority		1,996	37.48	▲2.58
BN hold		Swing		

Malacca state election, 1974: Sungei Rambai
Party	Candidate	Votes	%	∆%
BN	Ahmad Dahlan Salleh	3,114	67.45	▲13.26
PEKEMAS	Abdul Karim Abu	1,503	32.55	▲32.55
Total valid votes		4,617	100.00	
Total rejected ballots		300		
Unreturned ballots		0		
Turnout		4,917	78.18	▼1.06
Registered electors		6,289		
Majority		1,611	34.89	▲10.89
BN gain from Alliance		Swing		-

Malacca state election, 1969: Sungei Rambai
Party	Candidate	Votes	%	∆%
Alliance	Ahmad Dahlan Salleh	2,522	54.19	▼13.45
Parti Sosialis Rakyat Malaysia	Omar Abdullah	1,405	30.19	▲1.56
PMIP	Jantan Leman	727	15.62	▲11.89
Total valid votes		4,654	100.00	
Total rejected ballots		92		
Unreturned ballots		0		
Turnout		4,746	79.25	▼1.31
Registered electors		5,989		
Majority		1,117	24.00	▼15.01
Alliance hold		Swing		

Malacca state election, 1964: Sungei Rambai
Party	Candidate	Votes	%	∆%
Alliance	Ibrahim Abdul Hamid	2,880	67.64	▼0.34
Socialist Front	Omar Abdullah	1,219	28.63	▼3.39
PMIP	Ali Omar	159	3.73	▲3.73
Total valid votes		4,258	100.00	
Total rejected ballots		220		
Unreturned ballots		0		
Turnout		4,478	80.55	▲1.98
Registered electors		5,559		
Majority		1,661	39.01	▲3.05
Alliance hold		Swing		

Malacca state election, 1959: Sungei Rambai
Party	Candidate	Votes	%
Alliance	Ibrahim Abdul Hamid	2,346	67.98
Socialist Front	Othman Hussin	1,105	32.02
Total valid votes		3,451	100.00
Total rejected ballots		85	
Unreturned ballots		0	
Turnout		3,536	78.58
Registered electors		4,500	
Majority		1,241	35.96
This was a new constituency created.
