= Lendu (state constituency) =

State constituency in Malacca, Malaysia

Lendu (N04)
Malacca constituency

State constituency
- Legislature: Malacca State Legislative Assembly
MLA
Abdul Hakim Abdul Wahid
BN
- Constituency created: 2004
- First contested: 2004
- Last contested: 2026

Demographics
- Electors (2026): 15,043

N04 Lendu within Malacca, as used for the 2021 state election

Lendu is a state constituency in Malacca, Malaysia, that has been represented in the Malacca State Legislative Assembly.

The state constituency was first contested in 2004 and is mandated to return a single Assemblyman to the Malacca State Legislative Assembly under the first-past-the-post voting system. Since 2013, the State Assemblyman for Lendu was Sulaiman Md Ali from United Malays National Organisation (UMNO) which is part of the state's ruling coalition, Barisan Nasional (BN).

== Definition ==
The Lendu constituency contains the polling districts of Pekan Masjid Tanah, Durian Daun, Sungai Baru Hulu and Pekan Lendu.

== Demographics ==
Ethnic breakdown of Lendu's electorate as of 2026
1. Malays (77.5%)
2. Chinese (15.9%)
3. Indians (4.70%)
4. Other Ethnicities (2.00%)

== History ==
According to the gazette issued on 5 November 2026, the Lendu constituency has a total of 4 polling districts.

State constituency	Polling districts	Code	Location
Lendu (N04)	Pekan Masjid Tanah	134/04/01	SK Sri Laksamana; SJK (C) Masjid Tanah
Lendu (N04)	Durian Daun	134/04/02	SK Durian Daun
Lendu (N04)	Sungai Baru Hulu	134/04/03	SK Datuk Tambichik Karim; SM Sains Datuk Setia Abdul Ghani Ali
Lendu (N04)	Pekan Lendu	134/04/04	SJK (C) Lendu

=== Representation history ===
Members of the Legislative Assembly for Lendu
Assembly	No	Years	Member	Party
Constituency created from Masjid Tanah and Ramuan China
11th	N04	2004 – 2008	Abd Haziz Abdul Gani	BN (UMNO)
12th	N04	2008 – 2013	Idderis Kassim	BN (UMNO)
12th	N04	2013	Vacant (Note: Vacant from 10 March 2013 until the 2013 Malaysian general election due to the incumbent died in office.)	
13th	N04	2013 – 2018	Sulaiman Md Ali	BN (UMNO)
14th	N04	2018 – 2021	Sulaiman Md Ali	BN (UMNO)
15th	N04	2021 – 2026	Sulaiman Md Ali	BN (UMNO)
16th	N04	2026 – present	Abdul Hakim Abdul Wahid	BN (UMNO)

== Election results ==
Malacca state election, 2026
Party	Candidate	Votes	%	∆%
BN	Abdul Hakim Abdul Wahid	8,296	78.96	▲15.09
BERSATU	Nazri Ramli	2,211	21.04	▲21.04
Total valid votes		10,507		
Total rejected ballots		158		
Unreturned ballots		14		
Turnout		10,679	70.91	▲3.59
Registered electors		15,043		
Majority		6,085	57.92	▲13.73
BN hold		Swing		
Source(s) https://electiondata.my/elections/mlk/SE-16/

Malacca state election, 2021
Party	Candidate	Votes	%	∆%
BN	Sulaiman Md Ali	4,486	63.87	▲17.00
PN	Abdullah Mahadi	1,382	19.68	▲19.68
PH	Mohamad Asri Ibrahim	1,155	16.45	▼23.11
Total valid votes		5,887	100.00	
Total rejected ballots		75		
Unreturned ballots		12		
Turnout		7,110	67.32	▼16.75
Registered electors		10,561		
Majority		3,104	44.19	▲36.88
BN hold		Swing		
Source(s) https://lom.agc.gov.my/ilims/upload/portal/akta/outputp/1715764/PUB%20583.pdf

Malacca state election, 2018
Party	Candidate	Votes	%	∆%
BN	Sulaiman Md Ali	4,016	46.87	▼19.78
PKR	Ridhuan Affandi Abu Bakar	3,389	39.56	▲39.56
PAS	Arshad Mohamad Som	1,163	13.57	▼19.78
Total valid votes		8,568	100.00	
Total rejected ballots		83		
Unreturned ballots		50		
Turnout		8,701	84.07	▼1.97
Registered electors		10,350		
Majority		627	7.31	▼25.99
BN hold		Swing		

Malacca state election, 2013
Party	Candidate	Votes	%	∆%
BN	Sulaiman Md Ali	5,009	66.65	▲2.96
PAS	Asri Shaik Abdul Aziz	2,506	33.35	▼2.96
Total valid votes		7,515	100.00	
Total rejected ballots		98		
Unreturned ballots		0		
Turnout		7,613	86.04	▲8.93
Registered electors		8,848		
Majority		2,503	33.30	▲5.92
BN hold		Swing		
Source(s) "Federal Government Gazette - Notice of Contested Election, State Legislative Assembly for the State of Selangor [P.U. (B) 192/2013]" (PDF). Attorney General's Chambers of Malaysia. 26 April 2013. Archived from the original (PDF) on 2019-12-29. "Federal Government Gazette - Results of Contested Election and Statements of the Poll after the Official Addition of Votes, State Constituencies for the State of Selangor [P.U. (B) 233/2013]". Attorney General's Chambers of Malaysia. 22 May 2013. Archived from the original (PDF) on 2018-10-02.

Malacca state election, 2008
Party	Candidate	Votes	%	∆%
BN	Idderis Kassim	3,798	63.69	▼14.25
PAS	Mohammad Amir Yakub	2,165	36.31	▲14.25
Total valid votes		5,963	100.00	
Total rejected ballots		113		
Unreturned ballots		76		
Turnout		6,152	77.11	▼0.55
Registered electors		7,978		
Majority		1,633	27.38	▼28.50
BN hold		Swing		

Malacca state election, 2004
Party	Candidate	Votes	%
BN	Abdul Haziz Abdul Gani	4,546	77.94
PAS	Mohammad Amir Yakub	1,287	22.06
Total valid votes		5,833	100.00
Total rejected ballots		129	
Unreturned ballots		0	
Turnout		5,962	77.66
Registered electors		7,677	
Majority		3,259	55.88
BN hold		Swing	
This was a new constituency created.
