= Bukit Katil (state constituency) =

State constituency in Malacca, Malaysia

Bukit Katil (N17)
Malacca constituency

State constituency
- Legislature: Malacca State Legislative Assembly
MLA
Muhammad Ridzuan Mohd Sarif
PN
- Constituency created: 2018
- First contested: 2018
- Last contested: 2026

Demographics
- Electors (2026): 35,359

N17 Bukit Katil within Malacca, as used for the 2021 state election

Bukit Katil is a state constituency in Malacca, Malaysia, that has been represented in the Malacca State Legislative Assembly.

== Demographics ==
Ethnic breakdown of Bukit Katil's electorate as of 2026
1. Malays (64.8%)
2. Chinese (28.7%)
3. Indians (4.70%)
4. Other Ethnicities (1.80%)

== History ==
=== Polling districts ===
According to the federal gazette issued on 5 November 2026, the Bukit Katil constituency is divided into 8 polling districts.

State constituency	Polling District	Code	Location
Bukit Katil（N17）	Bukit Beruang	137/17/01	SMK Bukit Baru; SK Bukit Beruang
Bukit Katil（N17）	Padang Jambu	137/17/02	SRA (JAIM) Padang Jambu
Bukit Katil（N17）	Bukit Baru Dalam	137/17/03	SJK (C) Keh Seng
Bukit Katil（N17）	Paya Ikan	137/17/04	SK Jalan Datuk Palembang
Bukit Katil（N17）	Bukit Pulau	137/17/05	SRA (JAIM) Ar Rahman, Bukit Pulau
Bukit Katil（N17）	Kampungku Sayang	137/17/06	SK Bukit Baru
Bukit Katil（N17）	Taman Tun Rahah	137/17/07	SK Kampung Tun Razak; Kolej Vokasional Melaka Tengah
Bukit Katil（N17）	Kampung Bukit Katil	137/17/08	SK Dato' Demang Hussin; SMK Bukit Katil

=== Representation history ===
Members of the Legislative Assembly for Bukit Katil
Parliament	No	Years	Member	Party
Constituency renamed from Bukit Baru, Bachang and Duyong
14th	N17	2018–2021	Adly Zahari	PH (AMANAH)
15th	N17	2021–2026	Adly Zahari	PH (AMANAH)
16th	N17	2026 – present	Muhammad Ridzuan Mohd Sarif	PN (PAS)

== Election results ==
Malacca state election, 2026
Party	Candidate	Votes	%	∆%
PN	Muhammad Ridzuan Mohd Sarif	15,305	60.65	▲37.97
PH	Adly Zahari	8,698	34.47	▼7.08
BERSAMA	Aliza Che Amran	1,119	4.43	▲4.43
Independent	Abu Bakar Sabudin	115	0.46	▲0.46
Total valid votes		25,237		
Total rejected ballots		188		
Unreturned ballots		34		
Turnout		25,459	72.00	▲6.09
Registered electors		35,359		
Majority		6,607	25.58	▲19.13
PN gain from PH		Swing		-
Source(s) https://electiondata.my/elections/mlk/SE-16/

Malacca state election, 2021
Party	Candidate	Votes	%	∆%
PH	Adly Zahari	6,805	41.55	▲41.55
BN	Hasnoor Hussein	5,748	35.10	▼2.37
PN	Muhammad Al Afiz Yahya	3,715	22.68	▲22.68
Independent	Abdul Hamid Mustapah	109	0.67	▲0.67
Total valid votes		16,377	100.00	
Total rejected ballots		311		
Unreturned ballots		61		
Turnout		16,749	65.91	▼21.02
Registered electors		25,410		
Majority		1,057	6.45	▼6.15
PH hold		Swing		

Malacca state election, 2018
Party	Candidate	Votes	%
PKR	Adly Zahari	11,226	52.14
BN	Yunus Hitam	8,067	37.47
PAS	Muhamat Puhat Bedol	2,237	10.81
Total valid votes		21,530	100.00
Total rejected ballots		266	
Unreturned ballots		0	
Turnout		21,796	86.93
Registered electors		25,072	
Majority		3,159	12.60
This was a new constituency created.
