= Chief Minister of Malacca =

Chief executive of state of Malacca

- Ketua Menteri Melaka

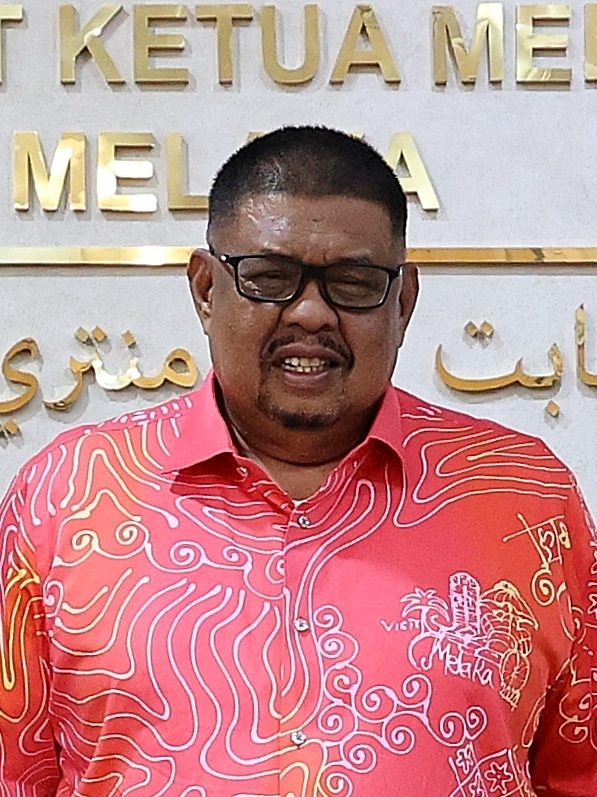
- Incumbent; Ab Rauf Yusoh since 31 March 2023
- Government of Malacca
- Style: Yang Amat Berhormat (The Most Honourable)
- Member of: Malacca State Executive Council
- Reports to: Malacca State Legislative Assembly
- Residence: Seri Bendahara, Ayer Keroh, Malacca
- Seat: Tingkat 4 (Suite), Blok Bendahara, Seri Negeri, Hang Tuah Jaya, 75450 Ayer Keroh, Malacca
- Appointer: Mohd Ali Rustam; as Yang di-Pertua Negeri of Malacca
- Term length: 5 years or lesser, renewable once (while commanding the confidence of the Malacca State Legislative Assembly With State Elections held no more than five years apart)
- Inaugural holder: Osman Talib
- Formation: 31 August 1957; 69 years ago
- Deputy: Senior Member of the Melaka State Executive Council (de facto)
- Website: www.melaka.gov.my/my/kerajaan/ketua-menteri-melaka

The chief minister of Malacca (Malay: Ketua Menteri Melaka) is the head of government in the Malaysian state of Malacca. According to convention, the chief minister is the leader of the majority party or largest coalition party in the Malacca State Legislative Assembly. The position has been held by Ab Rauf Yusoh since 31 March 2023.

== Appointment ==
According to the state constitution, the Yang di-Pertua Negeri of Malacca appoints the chief finister to preside over the Executive Council and requires the chief minister to be a member of the Legislative Assembly who in his judgment is likely to command the confidence of the majority of the members of the Assembly and must be a Malaysian citizen by naturalization or by registration. The Yang di-Pertua Negeri on the chief minister's advice can appoint no more than ten nor less than four members from among the members of the Legislative Assembly.

The member of the Executive Council must take and subscribe the oath of office and allegiance in the presence of the Yang di-Pertua Negeri as well as the oath of secrecy before they can exercise the functions of office. The Executive Council is collectively responsible to the Legislative Assembly. The members of the Executive Council can not hold any office of profit and engage in any trade, business or profession that would cause conflict of interest.

If a government cannot get its appropriation (budget) legislation passed by the Legislative Assembly, or the Legislative Assembly passes a vote of "no confidence" in the government, the chief minister is bound by convention to resign immediately. The Yang di-Pertua Negeri's choice of replacement chief minister will be dictated by the circumstances. A member of the Executive Council other than the chief minister can not hold office during the pleasure of the Yang di-Pertua Negeri, unless the appointment of any member of the Executive Council has been revoked by the Yang di-Pertua Negeri on the advice of the chief minister but may at any time resign his office.

Following a resignation in other circumstances, defeat in an election, or the death of a chief minister, the Yang di-Pertua Negeri will generally appoint the person voted by the governing party as their new leader to the position of chief minister.

== Powers ==
The power of the chief minister is subject to several limitations. Chief ministers removed as leader of their party, or whose government loses a vote of no confidence in the Legislative Assembly, must advise a state election to resign the office, or be dismissed by the Yang di-Pertua Negeri. The defeat of a supply bill (one that concerns the spending of money) or unable to pass important policy-related legislation is seen to require the resignation of the government or dissolution of the Legislative Assembly, much like a non-confidence vote, since a government that cannot spend money is hamstrung, also called loss of supply.

The chief minister's party will normally have a majority in the Legislative Assembly and party discipline is exceptionally strong in Malaccan politics, so passage of the government's legislation through the Legislative Assembly is mostly a formality.

== Caretaker chief minister ==
The Legislative Assembly continues for five years from the date of its first meeting unless dissolved by the Yang di-Pertua Negeri sooner. The state constitution permits a delay of 60 days of general election to be held from the date of dissolution and the Legislative Assembly to be summoned to meet on a date not later than 120 days from the date of dissolution. Conventionally, between the dissolution of one legislative assembly and the convening of the next, the chief minister and the executive council remain in office in a caretaker capacity.

== List of chief ministers of Malacca ==
The following is the list of chief ministers of Malacca since 1957:

Colour key (for political parties):
Alliance / BN PH

| No. | Portrait | Name (Birth–Death) Constituency | Term of office | | | Party (Note: This column names only the Chief Minister's party. The state government he heads may be a complex coalition of several parties and independents; those are not listed here.) | Election | Assembly |
| No. | Portrait | Name (Birth–Death) Constituency | Took office | Left office | Time in office | Party | Election | Assembly |
|---|---|---|---|---|---|---|---|---|
| 1 | | Osman Talib (1925–1984) | 31 August 1957 | 1 June 1959 | 1 year, 275 days | Alliance (UMNO) | – | – |
| 2 | | Abdul Ghafar Baba (1925–2006); MLA for Tanjong Kling | 1 June 1959 | 7 October 1967 | 8 years, 129 days | Alliance (UMNO) | 1959 | 1st |
| 2 | | Abdul Ghafar Baba (1925–2006); MLA for Tanjong Kling | 1 June 1959 | 7 October 1967 | 8 years, 129 days | Alliance (UMNO) | 1964 | 2nd |
| 3 | | Talib Karim (1911–1977); MLA for Alor Gajah | 7 October 1967 | 1 August 1972 | 4 years, 300 days | Alliance (UMNO) | – | 2nd |
| 3 | | Talib Karim (1911–1977); MLA for Alor Gajah | 7 October 1967 | 1 August 1972 | 4 years, 300 days | Alliance (UMNO) | 1969 | 3rd |
| 4 | | Abdul Ghani Ali (1923–2004); MLA for Ramuan China (until 1974); MLA for Sungei Bahru (from 1974) | 1 August 1972 | 11 July 1978 | 5 years, 345 days | Alliance (UMNO) | – | 3rd |
| 4 | | Abdul Ghani Ali (1923–2004); MLA for Ramuan China (until 1974); MLA for Sungei Bahru (from 1974) | 1 August 1972 | 11 July 1978 | 5 years, 345 days | BN (UMNO) | 1974 | 4th |
| 5 | | Mohd Adib Mohamad Adam (1941–2022); MLA for Ayer Panas | 11 July 1978 | 26 April 1982 | 3 years, 290 days | BN (UMNO) | 1978 | 5th |
| 6 | | Tan Sri Datuk Seri; Abdul Rahim Thamby Chik (born 1950); MLA for Kelemak (until 1986); MLA for Masjid Tanah (from 1986) | 26 April 1982 | 14 October 1994 | 12 years, 172 days | BN (UMNO) | 1982 | 6th |
| 6 | | Tan Sri Datuk Seri; Abdul Rahim Thamby Chik (born 1950); MLA for Kelemak (until 1986); MLA for Masjid Tanah (from 1986) | 26 April 1982 | 14 October 1994 | 12 years, 172 days | BN (UMNO) | 1986 | 7th |
| 6 | | Tan Sri Datuk Seri; Abdul Rahim Thamby Chik (born 1950); MLA for Kelemak (until 1986); MLA for Masjid Tanah (from 1986) | 26 April 1982 | 14 October 1994 | 12 years, 172 days | BN (UMNO) | 1990 | 8th |
| 7 | | Datuk Seri; Mohd Zin Abdul Ghani (1941–1997); MLA for Kelemak (until 1995); MLA for Melekek (from 1995) | 14 October 1994 | 14 May 1997 | 2 years, 213 days | BN (UMNO) | – | 8th |
| 7 | | Datuk Seri; Mohd Zin Abdul Ghani (1941–1997); MLA for Kelemak (until 1995); MLA for Melekek (from 1995) | 14 October 1994 | 14 May 1997 | 2 years, 213 days | BN (UMNO) | 1995 | 9th |
| 8 | | Datuk Seri; Abu Zahar Ithnin (1937–2013); MLA for Merlimau | 23 May 1997 | 2 December 1999 | 2 years, 194 days | BN (UMNO) | – | 9th |
| 9 | | Datuk Seri; Mohd Ali Rustam (born 1949); MLA for Paya Rumput (until 2004); MLA for Bukit Baru (from 2004) | 2 December 1999 | 7 May 2013 | 13 years, 157 days | BN (UMNO) | 1999 | 10th |
| 9 | | Datuk Seri; Mohd Ali Rustam (born 1949); MLA for Paya Rumput (until 2004); MLA for Bukit Baru (from 2004) | 2 December 1999 | 7 May 2013 | 13 years, 157 days | BN (UMNO) | 2004 | 11th |
| 9 | | Datuk Seri; Mohd Ali Rustam (born 1949); MLA for Paya Rumput (until 2004); MLA for Bukit Baru (from 2004) | 2 December 1999 | 7 May 2013 | 13 years, 157 days | BN (UMNO) | 2008 | 12th |
| 10 | | Datuk Seri Utama; Idris Haron (born 1966); MLA for Sungai Udang | 7 May 2013 | 11 May 2018 | 5 years, 5 days | BN (UMNO) | 2013 | 13th |
| 11 | | Adly Zahari (born 1971); MLA for Bukit Katil | 11 May 2018 | 9 March 2020 | 1 year, 304 days | PH (AMANAH) | 2018 | 14th |
| 12 | | Datuk Seri Utama; Sulaiman Md Ali (born 1966); MLA for Lendu | 9 March 2020 | 31 March 2023 | 3 years, 23 days | BN (UMNO) | – | 14th |
| 12 | | Datuk Seri Utama; Sulaiman Md Ali (born 1966); MLA for Lendu | 9 March 2020 | 31 March 2023 | 3 years, 23 days | BN (UMNO) | 2021 | 15th |
| 13 | | Datuk Seri Utama; Ab Rauf Yusoh (born 1961); MLA for Tanjung Bidara | 31 March 2023 | Incumbent | 3 years, 230 days | BN (UMNO) | – | 15th |
| 13 | | Datuk Seri Utama; Ab Rauf Yusoh (born 1961); MLA for Tanjung Bidara | 31 March 2023 | Incumbent | 3 years, 230 days | BN (UMNO) | 2026 | 16th |

=== Living former chief ministers ===
| Name | Term of office | Date of birth |
|---|---|---|
| Abdul Rahim Thamby Chik | 1982–1994 | 10 April 1950 (age 76) |
| Mohd Ali Rustam | 1999–2013 | 24 August 1949 (age 77) |
| Idris Haron | 2013–2018 | 13 May 1966 (age 60) |
| Adly Zahari | 2018–2020 | 15 February 1971 (age 55) |
| Sulaiman Md Ali | 2020–2023 | 20 December 1966 (age 59) |
