= Malaysian United Party =

Political party of Malaysia

Malaysian United Party Parti Bersama Malaysia
- Abbreviation: BERSAMA
- President: Ahmad Syukri Che Abdul Razab
- Co-de facto leaders: Rafizi Ramli; Nik Nazmi Nik Ahmad
- Founder: Tan Gin Theam
- Founded: March 2016
- Legalised: 2 December 2016
- Split from: People's Justice Party (PKR) (2026)
- Headquarters: 41, Jalan PP 16/4, Perdana Industrial Park, Taman Putra Perdana, 47136 Puchong, Selangor, Malaysia
- Membership: 29,200 (2026)
- Ideology: Third Way; Reformism; Progressivism; Social liberalism Liberal democracy
- Political position: Centre-left
- Colours: Yellow; Dark blue
- Slogan: Barisan Rakyat, Suara Malaysia (People's Front, Malaysia's Voice)
- Dewan Negara: 0 / 70
- Dewan Rakyat: 0 / 222
- Dewan Undangan Negeri: 0 / 611

Website
- bersama.org

The Malaysian United Party (Malay: Parti Bersama Malaysia, abbreviated BERSAMA) is a political party in Malaysia. The party was founded in 2016 with the intention of acting as a third force. It was taken over in 2026 by Rafizi Ramli and Nik Nazmi, and rebranded with a new symbol and manifesto.

== History ==
BERSAMA was registered in 2016 and based in George Town, Penang. The party's stated intention was to act as a third force in Malaysian politics and assume the role of providing check and balance on both the ruling and opposition parties. The initial membership of the party consisted of civil society members from the ethnic Chinese community helmed by business owner, Tan Gin Theam, aided by two former Barisan Nasional politicians, David Yim Boon Leong and Lim Boo Chang. The party was abbreviated as MU and MUP until 2026.

The party contested 20 state seats and five parliamentary seats, all in the state of Penang, in the 2018 Malaysian general election but failed in their maiden electoral venture with all their candidates having lost their deposits.

Rafizi Ramli and Nik Nazmi announced that they would take over the party on 19 May 2026. It will contest the next election without entering into any alliances. In conjunction with the takeover, a new 12-point agenda was announced.

On 16 October, Nik Nazmi was detained by the Selangor Islamic Religious Department on suspicion of khalwat. He was subsequently suspended from party activities for three months.

Former logo (2016-2026)

== Organisational structure ==
- President:
  - Ahmad Syukri Che Abdul Razab
- De facto co-leaders:
  - Rafizi Ramli
  - Nik Nazmi Nik Ahmad

== Election results ==
=== General election results ===
Election	Total seats won	Seats contested	Total votes	Voting Percentage	Outcome of election	Election leader
2018	0 / 222	5	2,102	0.02%	0 seat (Note: No representation in Parliament.)	Tan Gin Theam

=== State election results ===
State assembly	Election	Votes	%	Seats	Won/contested	+/–	Position	Status
Perlis	2022	Did not contest						No seats
Kedah	2023	Did not contest						No seats
Kelantan	2023	Did not contest						No seats
Terengganu	2023	Did not contest						No seats
Penang	2023	Did not contest						No seats
Perak	2022	Did not contest						No seats
Pahang	2022	Did not contest						No seats
Selangor	2023	Did not contest						No seats
Negeri Sembilan	2026	Did not contest						No seats
Malacca	2026	19,176	3.9	0 / 28	0 / 16	Steady	4th	No seats
Johor	2026	28,816	1.5	0 / 56	0 / 15	Steady	4th	No seats
Sabah	2025	Did not contest						No seats
Sarawak	2021	Did not contest						No seats

State election	State Legislative Assembly													
State election	Perlis	Kedah	Kelantan	Terengganu	Penang	Perak	Pahang	Selangor	Negeri Sembilan	Malacca	Johor	Sabah	Sarawak	Total won / Total contested
2018					0 / 40									0 / 20
2026										0 / 28	0 / 56			0 / 30

== See also ==
- Politics of Malaysia
- List of political parties in Malaysia
