= Malacca State Legislative Assembly =

Legislature of Malaysian state of Malacca

Malacca State Legislative Assembly Dewan Undangan Negeri Melaka ديوان اوندڠن نݢري ملاک
- 16th Malacca Legislative Assembly

Type
- Type: Unicameral

History
- Founded: 1959

Leadership
- Yang di-Pertua Negeri: Mohd Ali Rustam since 4 June 2020
- Speaker: Vacant, BN-UMNO since TBD
- Deputy Speaker: Mohd Yadzil Yaakub, PN-WAWASAN since TBD
- Chief Minister: Ab Rauf Yusoh, BN-UMNO since 31 March 2023
- Opposition Leader: Kerk Chee Yee, PH-DAP since 2026

Structure
- Seats: 28 + 0 Nominated Member (Maximum 35 Members); Quorum: 9 Simple majority: 15; Two-thirds majority: 19
- Political groups: (As of 14 November 2026) Government (24); BN (21): UMNO (18); MCA (2); MIC (1); PN (3): PAS (2); WAWASAN (1); Opposition (4); PH (4): DAP (4); Speaker BN (non-MLA)
- Committees: 4: Public Accounts Committee; Rules of Proceedings Committee; Right and Privileges Committee; Committee of Selection

Elections
- Voting system: Plurality: First-past-the-post (28 single-member constituencies)
- Last election: 14 November 2026
- Next election: TBD

Meeting place
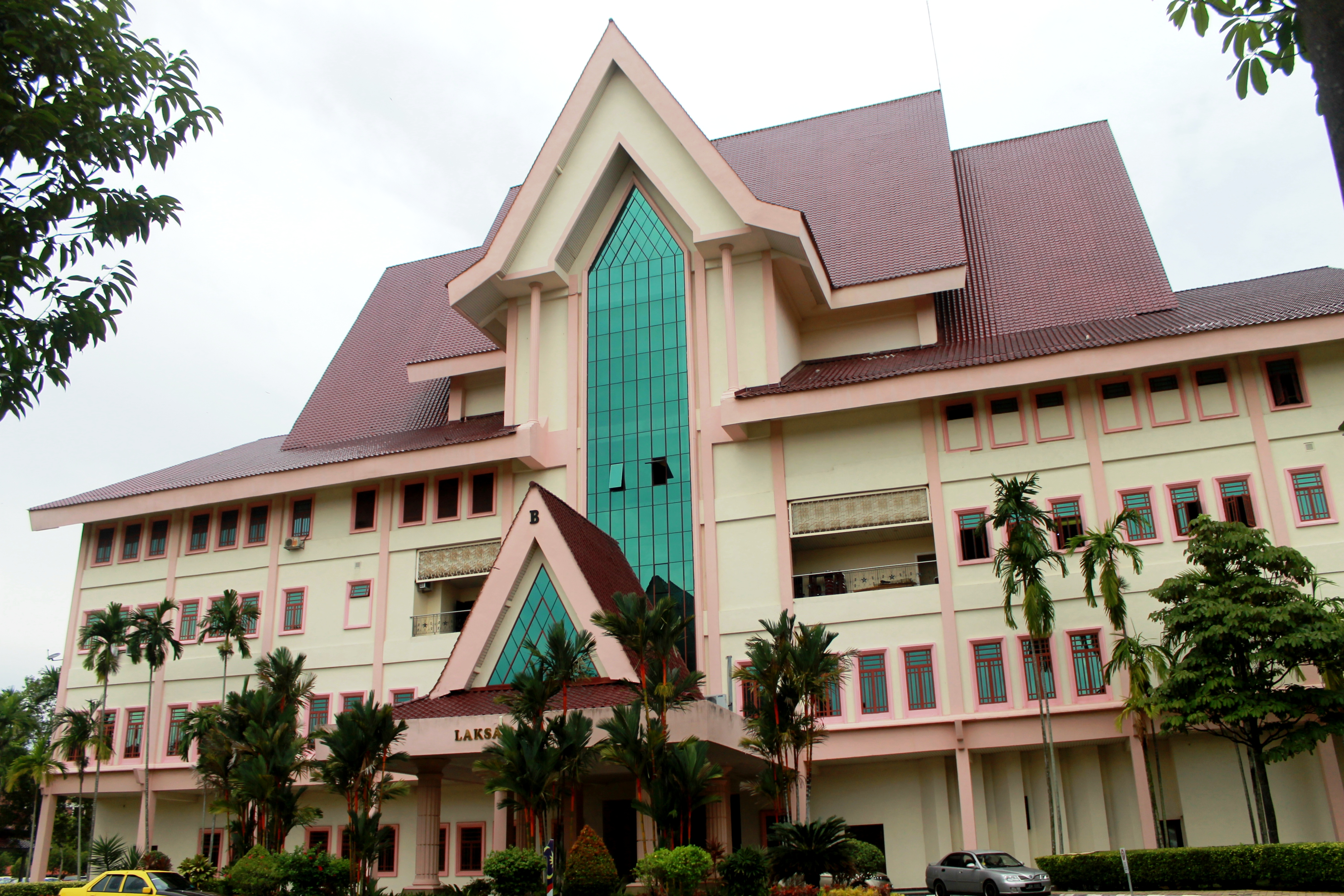
- Blok Laksamana, Seri Negeri complex, Hang Tuah Jaya, Ayer Keroh, Malacca

Website
- www.melaka.gov.my

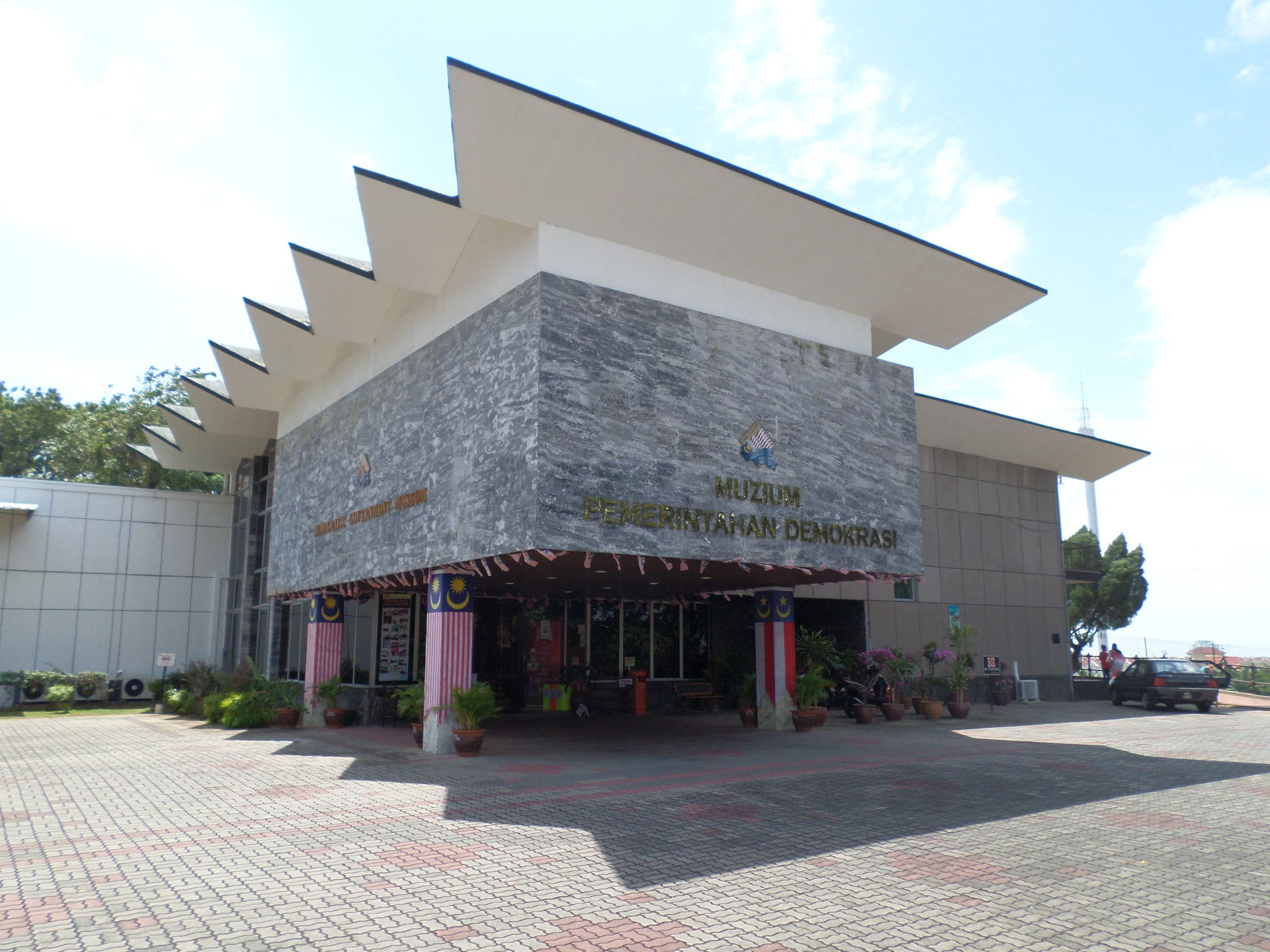
Former Malacca State Legislative Assembly building which is now the Democratic Government Museum.

The Malacca State Legislative Assembly (Malay: Dewan Undangan Negeri Melaka) is the unicameral legislature of the Malaysian state of Malacca. It is composed of 28 members who are elected from single-member constituencies throughout the state. Elections are held no more than five years apart, along with elections to the federal parliament and other state assemblies.

The State Legislative Assembly convenes at the Malacca State Secretariat Building, also known as the Seri Negeri complex in Ayer Keroh.

Map of current constituencies (since 2018)

== Current composition ==
Government (24)					Opposition (4)
BN			PN		PH
21			3		4
18	2	1	2	1	4
UMNO	MCA	MIC	PAS	WAWASAN	DAP

No.	Parliamentary Constituency	No.	State Constituency	Member	Coalition (Party)	Post
N/A	N/A	N/A	Non-MLA	TBD	TBD	
P134	Masjid Tanah	N01	Kuala Linggi	Rosli Abdullah	BN (UMNO)	Deputy EXCO Member
P134	Masjid Tanah	N02	Tanjung Bidara	Ab Rauf Yusoh	BN (UMNO)	Chief Minister
P134	Masjid Tanah	N03	Ayer Limau	Hameed Mytheen Kunju Basheer	BN (UMNO)	EXCO Member
P134	Masjid Tanah	N04	Lendu	Abdul Hakim Abdul Wahid	BN (UMNO)	Deputy EXCO Member
P134	Masjid Tanah	N05	Taboh Naning	Zulkiflee Mohd Zin	BN (UMNO)	Deputy EXCO Member
P135	Alor Gajah	N06	Rembia	Ahmad Norazril Abd Aziz	BN (UMNO)	Deputy EXCO Member
P135	Alor Gajah	N07	Gadek	Nadarajah Sellappa	BN (MIC)	EXCO Member
P135	Alor Gajah	N08	Machap Jaya	Ngwe Hee Sem	BN (MCA)	Deputy EXCO Member
P135	Alor Gajah	N09	Durian Tunggal	Mustafa Musa	BN (UMNO)	Deputy EXCO Member
P135	Alor Gajah	N10	Asahan	Fairul Nizam Roslan	BN (UMNO)	EXCO Member
P136	Tangga Batu	N11	Sungai Udang	Rais Yasin	BN (UMNO)	EXCO Member
P136	Tangga Batu	N12	Pantai Kundor	Tuminah Kadi	BN (UMNO)	Deputy EXCO Member
P136	Tangga Batu	N13	Paya Rumput	Rafie Ahmad	PN (PAS)	
P136	Tangga Batu	N14	Kelebang	Lim Ban Hong	BN (MCA)	EXCO Member
P137	Hang Tuah Jaya	N15	Pengkalan Batu	Siti Aisyah Mahmood	BN (UMNO)	Deputy EXCO Member
P137	Hang Tuah Jaya	N16	Ayer Keroh	Kerk Chee Yee	PH (DAP)	
P137	Hang Tuah Jaya	N17	Bukit Katil	Muhammad Ridzuan Mohd Sarif	PN (PAS)	EXCO Member
P137	Hang Tuah Jaya	N18	Ayer Molek	Mohd Ridhwan Mohd Ali	BN (UMNO)	EXCO Member
P138	Kota Melaka	N19	Kesidang	Allex Seah Shoo Chin	PH (DAP)	
P138	Kota Melaka	N20	Kota Laksamana	Low Chee Leong	PH (DAP)	
P138	Kota Melaka	N21	Duyong	Mohd Noor Helmy Abdul Halem	BN (UMNO)	
P138	Kota Melaka	N22	Bandar Hilir	Leng Chau Yen	PH (DAP)	
P138	Kota Melaka	N23	Telok Mas	Abdul Razak Abdul Rahman	BN (UMNO)	EXCO Member
P139	Jasin	N24	Bemban	Mohd Yadzil Yaakub	PN (WAWASAN)	
P139	Jasin	N25	Rim	Khaidirah Abu Zahar	BN (UMNO)	EXCO Member
P139	Jasin	N26	Serkam	Azman Abdullah	BN (UMNO)	Deputy EXCO Member
P139	Jasin	N27	Merlimau	Muhamad Akmal Saleh	BN (UMNO)	EXCO Member
P139	Jasin	N28	Sungai Rambai	Jezlee Pit	BN (UMNO)	Deputy EXCO Member

== Seating arrangement ==
Vacant	N06 Rembia (Deputy EXCO Member)	N28 Sungai Rambai (Deputy EXCO Member)	N26 Serkam (Deputy EXCO Member)	N04 Lendu (Deputy EXCO Member)		N13 Paya Rumput (Deputy EXCO Member)	N12 Pantai Kundor (Deputy EXCO Member)	N01 Kuala Linggi (Deputy EXCO Member)	Vacant
Vacant	N15 Pengkalan Batu (Deputy EXCO Member)	N18 Ayer Molek (EXCO Member)	N25 Rim (EXCO Member)	N03 Ayer Limau (EXCO Member)	N10 Asahan (EXCO Member)	N23 Telok Mas (EXCO Member)	N27 Merlimau (EXCO Member)	N21 Duyong (Deputy EXCO Member)	State Financial Officer
Vacant	N22 Bandar Hilir	N07 Gadek (EXCO Member)	B	Sergeant-at-Arm		A	N14 Klebang (EXCO Member)	N08 Machap Jaya (Deputy EXCO Member)	State Legal Advisor
Vacant	N20 Kota Laksamana	N17 Bukit Katil (EXCO Member)	B	the Mace		A	N11 Sungai Udang (EXCO Member)	N09 Durian Tunggal (Deputy EXCO Member)	State Secretary
	N19 Kesidang	Vacant	B	Secretary		A	N02 Tanjung Bidara (Chief Minister)	N05 Taboh Naning (Deputy EXCO Member)
	N16 Ayer Keroh (Opposition Leader)		B	Speaker		A		N24 Bemban (Deputy Speaker)
				Yang Di-Pertua Negeri

== Role ==
The Malacca State Legislative Assembly's main function is to enact laws that apply in the state. It is also the forum for members to voice their opinions on the state government's policies and implementation of those policies. Under the Privileges, Immunities and Powers Ordinance 1963, assemblymen are given the right to freely discuss current issues such as public complaints. On financial matters, the Assembly approves supply to the government and ensures that the funds are spent as approved and in the tax-payers' interest.

The State Executive Council (EXCO) is appointed from members of the State Assembly. Led by the Chief Minister, it exercises executive power on behalf of the Governor and is responsible to the State Assembly.

=== Melcat ===
The Speaker also chairs the Malacca Committee on Competency, Accountability and Transparency (Melcat), a six-member panel consisting of state assemblymen which holds public hearings to investigate state issues. Melcat was formed when Pakatan Harapan came to power after the 2018 election.

== Speakers of the Assembly ==
The following are the Speakers of the Malacca State Legislative Assembly since 1959:

No.	Speaker	Term start	Term end	Party	Constituency
1	Goh Kay Seng	23 May 1959	29 February 1964	Alliance (MCA)	Kota Barat
2	Talib Karim	21 May 1964	5 October 1967	Alliance (UMNO)	Alor Gajah
3	Mohd Abd. Rahman	20 November 1967	19 March 1969	Alliance (UMNO)	Batu Berendam
4	Ahmad Manap	7 April 1971	11 June 1978	Alliance (UMNO)	Tanjong Kling
4	Ahmad Manap	7 April 1971	11 June 1978	BN (UMNO)	Sungei Udang
5	Abdul Aziz Tapa	15 September 1978	28 March 1982	BN (UMNO)	Nyalas
6	Abdul Razak Alias	31 May 1982	19 July 1986	BN (UMNO)	Taboh Naning
7	Abu Zahar Ithnin	4 August 1986	19 October 1994	BN (UMNO)	Sungai Rambai
8	Jaafar Lajis	25 October 1994	5 April 1995	BN (UMNO)	Rim
9	Nasir Manap	8 June 1995	December 1999	BN (UMNO)	Alai
10	Amid Nordin	December 1999	March 2004	BN (UMNO)	Alai
11	Mo'min Abd Aziz	March 2004	April 2008	BN (UMNO)	Non-MLA
12	Othman Muhamad	April 2008	April 2018	BN (UMNO)	Non-MLA
13	Omar Jaafar	19 July 2018	11 May 2020	PH (PKR)	Non-MLA
14	Ab Rauf Yusoh	11 May 2020	4 October 2021	BN (UMNO)	Non-MLA
15	Ibrahim Durum	27 December 2021	Incumbent	BN (UMNO)	Non-MLA

== Election pendulum ==
The 2026 Malacca state election witnessed 24 governmental seats and 4 non-governmental seats filled the Malacca State Legislative Assembly. The government side has 20 safe seats and 2 fairly safe seat, while the non-government side has 3 safe seats.

2026 Malacca state election

GOVERNMENT SEATS
Marginal
Machap Jaya	Ngwe Hee Sem	MCA	58.56
Gadek	Nadarajah Sellappa	MIC	58.66
Fairly safe
Paya Rumput	Rafie Ahmad	PAS	58.79
Pantai Kundor	Tuminah Kadi @ Mohd Hashim	UMNO	59.19
Safe
Bukit Katil	Muhammad Ridzuan Mohd Sarif	PAS	60.65
Pengkalan Batu	Siti Aisyah Mahmood	UMNO	62.93
Kelebang	Lim Ban Hong	MCA	63.57
Bemban	Mohd Yadzil Yaakub	WAWASAN	64.56
Durian Tunggal	Mustafa Musa	UMNO	64.86
Rembia	Ahmad Norazril Abd Aziz	UMNO	65.77
Kuala Linggi	Rosli Abdullah	UMNO	70.06
Telok Mas	Abdul Razak Abdul Rahman	UMNO	73.35
Duyong	Mohd Noor Helmy Abdul Halem	UMNO	74.98
Rim	Khaidirah Abu Zahar	UMNO	78.13
Sungai Rambai	Jezlee Pit	UMNO	78.72
Lendu	Abdul Hakim Abdul Wahid	UMNO	78.96
Merlimau	Muhamad Akmal Saleh	UMNO	79.71
Taboh Naning	Zulkiflee Mohd Zin	UMNO	81.76
Asahan	Fairul Nizam Roslan	UMNO	82.01
Ayer Molek	Mohd Ridhwan Mohd Ali	UMNO	83.58
Sungai Udang	Rais Yasin	UMNO	84.25
Serkam	Azman Abdullah	UMNO	86.07
Tanjung Bidara	Ab Rauf Yusoh	UMNO	87.32
Ayer Limau	Hameed Mytheen Kunju Basheer	UMNO	88.13

NON-GOVERNMENT SEATS
Marginal
Ayer Keroh	Kerk Chee Yee	DAP	55.08
Safe
Kesidang	Allex Seah Shoo Chin	DAP	60.03
Kota Laksamana	Low Chee Leong	DAP	68.35
Bandar Hilir	Leng Chau Yen	DAP	74.52

== List of Assemblies ==
Assembly	Term began	Members	Committee	Governing parties
Settlement Council	1955	19	Osman (1957–1959)	Alliance (UMNO–MCA)
1st	1959	20	Abdul Ghafar I	Alliance (UMNO–MCA)
2nd	1964	20	Abdul Ghafar II (1964–1967); Talib I (1967–1969)	Alliance (UMNO–MCA–MIC)
3rd	1969	20	Talib II (1969–1972)	Alliance (UMNO–MCA)
3rd	1969	20	Abdul Ghani I (1972–1974)	Alliance (UMNO–MCA) (1972–1973)
3rd	1969	20	Abdul Ghani I (1972–1974)	BN (UMNO–MCA) (1973–1974)
4th	1974	20	Abdul Ghani II	BN (UMNO–MCA)
5th	1978	20	Mohd Adib	BN (UMNO–MCA)
6th	1982	20	Abdul Rahim I	BN (UMNO–MCA)
7th	1986	20	Abdul Rahim II	BN (UMNO–MCA–MIC)
8th	1990	20	Abdul Rahim III (1990–1994); Mohd Zin I (1994–1995)	BN (UMNO–MCA–MIC)
9th	1995	25	Mohd Zin II (1995–1997); Abu Zahar I (1997–1999)	BN (UMNO–MCA–MIC)
10th	1999	25	Mohd Ali I	BN (UMNO–MCA–MIC)
11th	2004	28	Mohd Ali II	BN (UMNO–MCA–MIC–GERAKAN)
12th	2008	28	Mohd Ali III	BN (UMNO–MCA–MIC)
13th	2013	28	Idris Harun	BN (UMNO–MCA–MIC)
14th	2018	28	Adly (2018–2020)	PH (AMANAH–DAP–PKR–BERSATU)
14th	2018	28	Sulaiman I (2020–2021)	BN (UMNO)–PN (BERSATU) (2020–2021)
15th	2021	28	Sulaiman II (2021–2023)	BN (UMNO–MCA–MIC) (2021–2022)
15th	2021	28	Sulaiman II (2021–2023)	BN (UMNO–MCA–MIC)–PH (DAP–AMANAH) (2022–2023)
15th	2021	28	Ab Rauf (2023–2026)	BN (UMNO–MCA–MIC)–PH (DAP–AMANAH) (2023–2026)
15th	2021	28	Ab Rauf (2023–2026)	BN (UMNO–MCA–MIC) (2026)
16th	2026	28	Ab Rauf II	BN (UMNO–MCA–MIC)–PN (PAS–WAWASAN) (2026–present)

== See also ==
- List of State Seats Representatives in Malaysia
- State legislative assemblies of Malaysia
