= Government of Malacca =

Executive and legislative authorities governing the Malaysian state of Malacca

Malacca state government
- Kerajaan Negeri Melaka
- State government
- Coat of arms of Malacca

Overview
- Established: 31 August 1957; 69 years ago
- State: Malacca
- Leader: Chief Minister
- Appointed by: Yang di-Pertua Negeri
- Main organ: Malacca State Executive Council
- Ministries: 15 departments
- Responsible to: Malacca State Legislative Assembly
- Annual budget: RM621.8 million (2026)
- Headquarters: Seri Negeri complex, Ayer Keroh
- Website: www.melaka.gov.my

The Government of Malacca refers to the government authority of the Malaysian state of Malacca. The state government adheres to and is created by both the Malaysian federal constitution, the supreme law of Malaysia, and the constitution of Malacca, the supreme law in Malacca. The government of Malacca is based in the town of Ayer Keroh instead of the state's official capital Malacca City.

The state government consists of only two branches - executive and legislative. The Malacca State Executive Council forms the executive branch, whilst the Malacca State Legislative Assembly is the legislature of the state government. Malacca's head of government is the chief minister. The state government does not have a judiciary branch, as Malaysia's judicial system is a federalised system operating uniformly throughout the country.

== Executive ==
=== Head of government ===
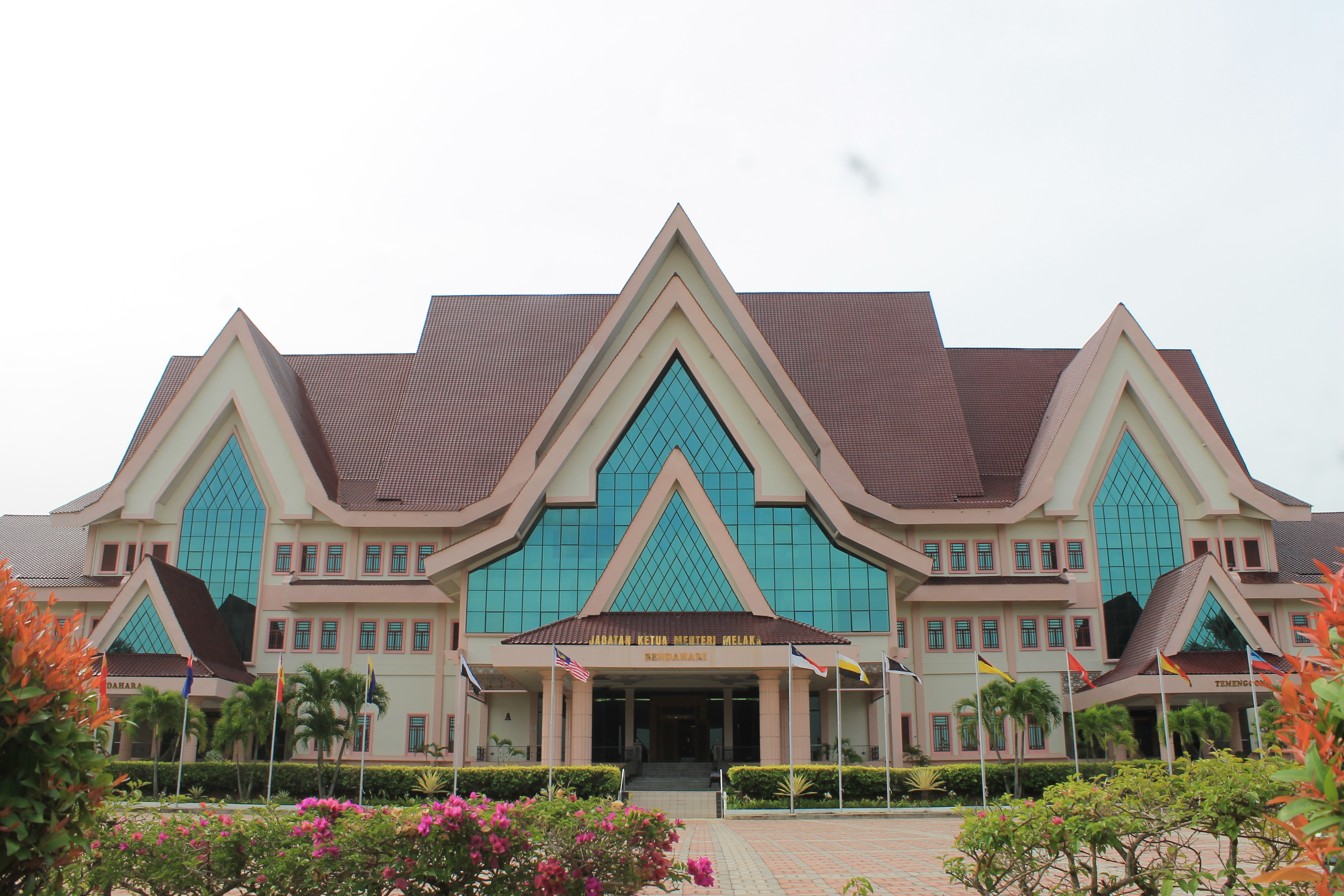
The Seri Negeri complex houses the Office of the Chief Minister of Malacca and the Legislative Assembly Building, as well as other state government offices.

The Chief Minister is the head of government in Malacca. He is officially appointed by the Governor, Malacca's head of state, on the basis of the latter's judgement that the former commands the confidence of the majority of the State Assemblymen in the Malacca State Legislative Assembly. The Chief Minister and his Executive Council shall be collectively responsible to Legislative Assembly. The Office of the Chief Minister is situated at the Seri Negeri complex Bendahara Block in Ayer Keroh.

The current Chief Minister of Malacca is Ab Rauf Yusoh of the United Malays National Organisation (UMNO), which controls the most seats in the State Legislative Assembly among the Barisan Nasional component parties. Yusoh was sworn in on 31 March 2023 after his predecessor Sulaiman Md Ali resigned two days prior on 29 March 2023.

=== Cabinet ===
The Malacca State Executive Council forms the executive branch of the Malacca state government and is analogous in function to the Malaysian federal Cabinet. The Executive Council comprises the Chief Minister, and between four and ten other State Assemblymen from the Malacca State Legislative Assembly. Aside from these, three other ex officio members of the Executive Council are the State Secretary, the State Legal Adviser and the State Financial Officer.

Members of the Executive Council since 31 March 2023 are as follows.

==== Members ====
BN (10)	PH (1)
UMNO (8); MCA (1); MIC (1)	DAP (1)

Name	Portfolio	Party	Constituency	Term start	Term end
Ab Rauf Yusoh (Chief Minister)	Economic Planning; Finance; Land Affairs; Non-governmental Agencies; Investment; Industry; Technical, Vocational Education and Training (TVET) Development	BN (UMNO)	Tanjung Bidara	31 March 2023	Incumbent
Rais Yasin (Senior Member)	Housing; Local Government; Drainage; Climate Change; Disaster Management	BN (UMNO)	Paya Rumput	5 April 2023	Incumbent
Abdul Razak Abdul Rahman	Tourism; Heritage; Arts; Culture	BN (UMNO)	Telok Mas	5 April 2023	Incumbent
Muhamad Akmal Saleh	Rural Development; Agriculture; Food Security	BN (UMNO)	Merlimau	5 April 2023	19 January 2026
Kalsom Noordin	Women Development; Family Development; Community Development	BN (UMNO)	Pengkalan Batu	5 April 2023	Incumbent
Rahmad Mariman	Education; Higher Education; Religious Affairs	BN (UMNO)	Ayer Molek	5 April 2023	Incumbent
Fairul Nizam Roslan	Science; Technology; Innovation; Digital Communications	BN (UMNO)	Asahan	5 April 2023	Incumbent
Hameed Mytheen Kunju Basheer	Works; Infrastructure; Public Facilities; Transport	BN (UMNO)	Ayer Limau	5 April 2023	Incumbent
Ngwe Hee Sem	Health; Human Resources; Unity	BN (MCA)	Machap Jaya	5 April 2023	Incumbent
Shanmugam Ptcyhay	Youth; Sports; Non-governmental Organisations (NGOs)	BN (MIC)	Gadek	5 April 2023	Incumbent
Allex Seah Shoo Chin	Entrepreneur Development; Cooperatives; Consumer Affairs	PH (DAP)	Kesidang	5 April 2023	Incumbent

==== Deputy Members ====
BN (8)	PH (2)
UMNO (8)	DAP (2)

Deputy Members since 6 April 2023 have been :

Name	Portfolio	Party	Constituency	Term start	Term end
Khaidhirah Abu Zahar	Economic Planning; Finance; Land Affairs; Non-governmental Agencies; Investment; Industry; Technical, Vocational Education and Training (TVET) Development	BN (UMNO)	Rim	6 April 2023	Incumbent
Zulkiflee Mohd Zin	Housing; Local Government; Drainage; Climate Change; Disaster Management	BN (UMNO)	Taboh Naning	6 April 2023	Incumbent
Zaidi Attan	Tourism; Heritage; Arts; Culture	BN (UMNO)	Serkam	6 April 2023	Incumbent
Low Chee Leong	Rural Development; Agriculture; Food Security	PH (DAP)	Kota Laksamana	6 April 2023	Incumbent
Leng Chau Yen	Women Development; Family Development; Community Development	PH (DAP)	Bandar Hilir	6 April 2023	Incumbent
Rosli Abdullah	Education; Higher Education; Religious Affairs	BN (UMNO)	Kuala Linggi	6 April 2023	Incumbent
Mohd Noor Helmy Abdul Halem	Science; Technology; Innovation; Digital Communications	BN (UMNO)	Duyong	6 April 2023	Incumbent
Zahari Abd Khalil	Works; Infrastructure; Public Facilities; Transport	BN (UMNO)	Durian Tunggal	6 April 2023	Incumbent
Siti Faizah Abdul Azis	Health; Human Resources; Unity	BN (UMNO)	Sungai Rambai	6 April 2023	Incumbent
Vacant	Youth; Sports; Non-governmental Organisations (NGOs)	Vacant			
Tuminah Kadi	Entrepreneur Development; Cooperatives; Consumer Affairs	BN (UMNO)	Pantai Kundor	6 April 2023	Incumbent

=== Ex officio members ===
The State Secretary, the State Legal Adviser and the State Financial Officer are ex officio members of the Executive Council.

Name	Position	Ref
Azhar Arshad	State Secretary	
Khairul Azreem Mamat	State Legal Adviser	
Salhah Salleh	State Financial Officer	

== Legislature ==
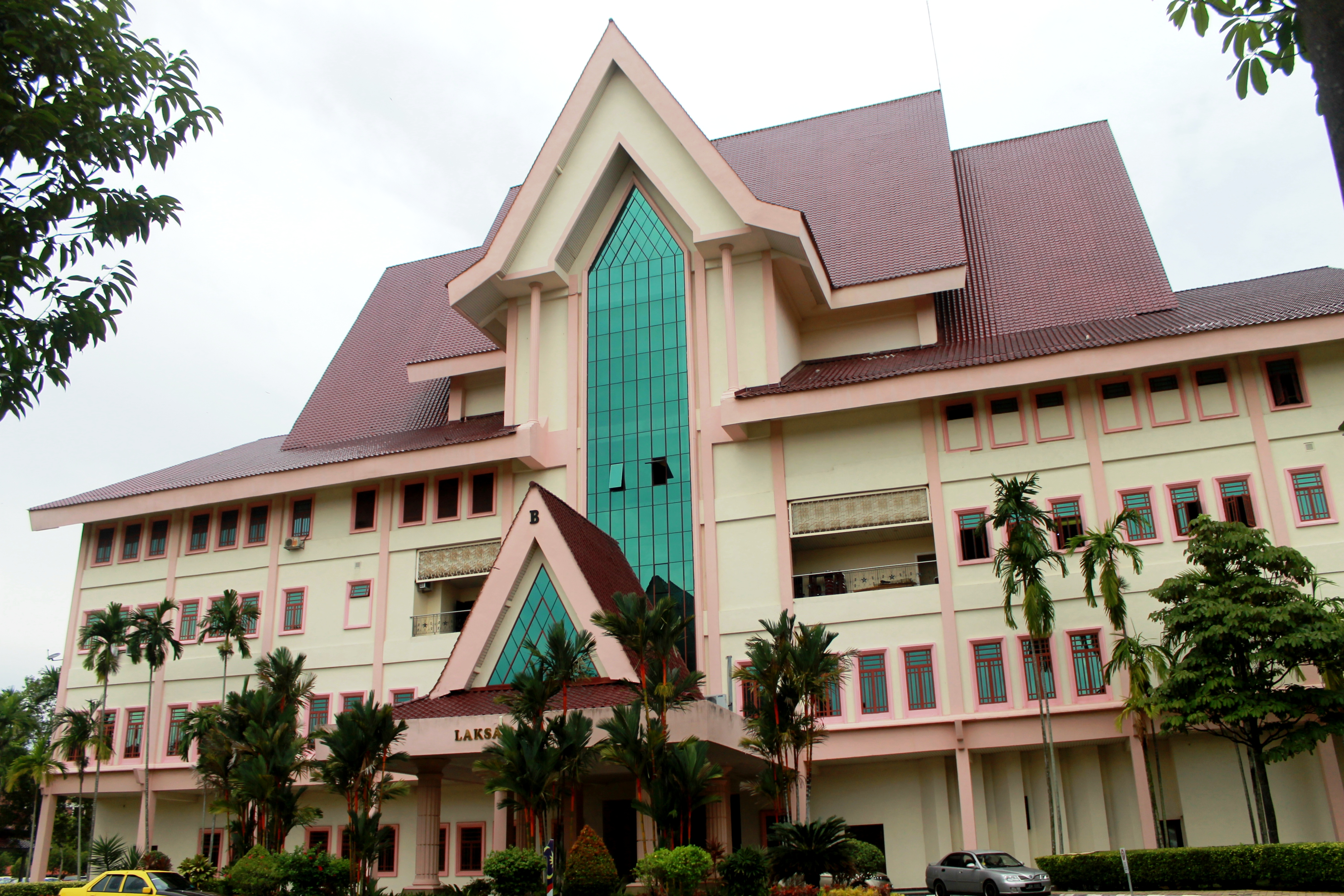
Seri Negeri complex Laksamana Block

Composition of the Malacca State Legislative Assembly. Barisan Nasional (BN) seats Pakatan Harapan (PH) seats Perikatan Nasional (PN) seats

The Malacca State Legislative Assembly is the legislative branch of the Malacca state government. The unicameral legislature consists of 28 seats that represent the 28 state constituencies within Malacca, with each constituency being represented by an elected State Assemblyman. The Legislative Assembly convenes at the Seri Negeri complex Laksamana Block in Ayer Keroh.

The legislature has a maximum mandate of five years by law and follows a multi-party system; the ruling party (or coalition) is elected through a first-past-the-post system. The Governor may dissolve the legislature at any time and usually does so upon the advice of the Chief Minister.

A Speaker is elected by the Legislative Assembly to preside over the proceedings and debates of the legislature. The Speaker may or may not be an elected State Assemblyman; in the case of the latter, the elected Speaker shall become a member of the Legislative Assembly additional to the elected State Assemblymen already in the legislature.

== Malacca State Government Secretariat ==
=== Development Cluster ===
- State Economic Planning Unit
- Local Government Unit
- Water Regulatory Agency
- Musaadah Services and Youth Development Division
- Infrastructure Corridor and Social Impact Division
- Tourism Promotion Division (Tourism Melaka)

=== Management Cluster ===
- Human Resources Management Division
- Management Services Division
- State Legislative Assembly and Executive Council Unit
- Malacca State Education Trust Fund
- Malacca State Sports Council
- Office of Chief Minister

=== Information and Communications Technology Cluster ===
- Integrity Unit
- Corporate Communications Division
- Internal Audit and Public Inquiry Division
- Chief Minister Incorporated

== Departments, statutory bodies and subsidiaries ==
=== Departments ===
- Malacca State Treasury and Finance Department
- Malacca State Mufti Department
- Malacca State Syariah Judiciary Department
- Malacca State Syariah Prosecution Department
- Office of Lands and Mines Malacca
- Malacca Town and Country Planning Department (PLANMalaysia Melaka)
- Malacca Islamic Religious Affairs Department
- Malacca Irrigation and Drainage Department
- Malacca Public Works Department
- Malacca Social Welfare Department
- Malacca State Agriculture Department
- Malacca Veterinary Services Department
- Malacca State Forestry Department

=== Statutory bodies ===
- Malacca State Development Corporation (Melaka Corporation)
- Malacca Customary Land Development Corporation
- Malacca Foundation
- Malacca Museum Corporation
- Malacca Public Library Corporation
- Malacca Islamic Religious Council
- Malacca Biotechnology Corporation
- Malacca Green Technology Corporation
- Malacca River And Coastal Development Corporation
- Malacca Housing Board
- Malacca Stadium Corporation
- Office of the Strait of Malacca Waterfront Economic Zone

=== Subsidiaries ===
- Chief Minister Incorporated
  - Syarikat Air Melaka
  - Kumpulan Melaka Berhad
    - Melaka International Bowling Centre (MITC Bowlplex Sdn Bhd)
    - Taming Sari Tower (Melaka Taming Sari Berhad)
    - KMB Iklim Marin Sdn Bhd
    - Kumpulan Melaka Engineering Sdn Bhd
    - Konsortium Bersatu YKIP Sdn. Bhd. (Affiliated)
    - KMB Express Solution Sdn. Bhd. (Affiliated)
    - Wangi KMB Sdn. Bhd. (Affiliated)
    - KMB Quarry Sdn Bhd (Affiliated)
    - KMB Travel Holidays Sdn Bhd (Affiliated)
    - Tanjung Bruas Port Sdn Bhd (Affiliated, joint venture with MMC Corporation)
    - Indera Persada Sdn Bhd (Affiliated)
    - Padang Pahlawan Sdn Bhd (Affiliated)
    - Putra Specialist Hospital (Affiliated)
    - Panorama Melaka Sdn Bhd (Defunct)
  - Pemasaran Melaka Sdn Bhd
  - Melaka Youth Development Corporation Sdn Bhd
  - Melaka Hari Ini Sdn Bhd
  - Melaka Finance House Berhad (Co-owned with Education Trust Fund)
  - Farmasi Putra Sdn Bhd (Affiliated)
  - Klinik Putra Sdn Bhd (Affiliated)
  - Marble Valley Two Sdn Bhd (Affiliated)
- Malacca State Development Corporation (Melaka Corporation)
  - Melaka International Trade Centre
  - Melaka Sentral
  - Perbadanan Melaka Holdings Sdn Bhd
  - MCorp Hotel Sdn Bhd
  - MCorp Technology Sdn Bhd
  - Melaka Halal Hub Sdn Bhd
  - PM Multilink Sdn Bhd
  - Invest Melaka Berhad
  - PM Project Centre Sdn Bhd
  - Melaka Bekal Sdn Bhd
  - MCorp Corporate Services Sdn Bhd
- Malacca Foundation (Yayasan Melaka)
  - Pembangunan Pertanian Melaka Sdn Bhd
  - Hartanah Bumiputera Melaka
  - Melaka International College of Science and Technology (MICOST)
  - SAMEL Plantation Sdn Bhd
  - YM Creative World Sdn Bhd
  - International College of Yayasan Melaka (Yaspem Sdn Bhd)
- Malacca Museum Corporation
  - Melaka World Heritage Sdn Bhd

== District and Land Offices ==
- Alor Gajah District
- Jasin District
- Melaka Tengah District

== Local governments ==
- Alor Gajah Municipal Council
- Hang Tuah Jaya Municipal Council
- Jasin Municipal Council
- Malacca City Council
