= Lee Kiat Lee =

Malaysian politician

- 李杰尔

Personal details
- Born: 23 June 1975 (age 50) Malacca, Malaysia
- Party: Malaysian Chinese Association (MCA)
- Spouse: Leong How Luan
- Children: 3 sons
- Occupation: Advocate & Solicitor/Politician

Lee Kiat Lee (simplified Chinese: 李杰尔; traditional Chinese: 李傑爾; pinyin: Lǐ Jié'ěr; Pe̍h-ōe-jī: Lí Kia̍t-ní; born 23 June 1975) is a Malaysian politician for the Malaysian Chinese Association (MCA), in Malaysia. He is also an advocate and solicitor by profession.

== Biography ==
Born on 23 June 1975 in Malacca, Lee Kiat Lee is the eldest son of Mr Lee Han Kiong who is a former housing contractor and runs a food and beverage business called “Wang Food Court” in Pengkalan Rama within Dun Duyong from 1994 to 2009. Kiat Lee’s mother, Mdm Chong Ah Lan, is the director of a housing developer company, Chong Woo Yit Sdn Bhd in Malim, Melaka. Kiat Lee has two sisters. In year 2000, follows his father footstep, Kiat Lee also ventures in food and beverage business and opened a restaurant “Jit Seng Vegetarian” in Melaka Raya, Melaka.

=== Education ===
Lee Kiat Lee started his early education stage in Sekolah Jenis Kebangsaan (C) Siang Lin in Durian Daun, Melaka which he then continues and completed his secondary education in Pay Fong High School Melaka in 1993. In 1994, Kiat Lee studied Law in HELP University, formally known as Help Institute and, subsequently as HELP University College in Kuala Lumpur. He continue to pursue his Law is University of Glamorgan in South Wales, United Kingdom. After Wales in 1998, Kiat Lee continues with his CLP back in University of Malaya and done his reading in Chamber in a prominent firm in Malacca in 1999. In 2001, Kiat Lee qualified as an Advocate & Solicitor of High Courts (Malaysia) and practiced as a Legal Assistant until 2006. Since 2006, Lee founded and started his own legal firm with a partner in the name Messrs “Chia & Lee”

=== Marriage and children ===
Kiat Lee is married to Leong How Luan. The couple have three sons.

== Political background ==
Kiat Lee started to be active in politics when he joined as a Malaysian Chinese Association (MCA) member in 2003. In 2004, Kiat Lee assisted YB Wong Nai Chee who was the candidate of Barisan National in 2004 General Election for constituency Kota Melaka (P138). Lee has assisted YB Wong Nai Chee in work and planning in MCA party. In 2008, Kiat Lee himself contested in DUN Kota Laksamana, Melaka under MCA party ticket against Betty Chew from DAP party. Since 2006, Kiat Lee is the Chairman of Jalan Tun Tan Cheng Lock MCA Branch in Melaka. He is also the Chief for Legal Aid Bureau MCA Youth Melaka and MCA Division Kota Melaka. Beside that, Kiat Lee is also the Legal Advisor for MCA Melaka Crisis Relief Squad and MCA Melaka Public Complain Bureau.

In 2008, Kiat Lee, a new candidate at that time, was defeated by Betty Chew for the Kota Laksamana seat where he had only 3,801 votes against 11,043 votes with Chew. Even though Kiat Lee had lost, he said that he had learned a lot through that election. He has discovered a way to enrich people's life through his own experience in the election and ways to deal with greater pressure.

== Social service background ==
- Former President of Persatuan Penduduk-penduduk Taman ASEAN, Melaka
- Deputy Chief of Chinese Assembly Hall, Youth
- Advisor of Lee Association, both Mother Body and Youth Section, Melaka
- First Class Performer of Persatuan Seni Pertuturan (Cross talk) Cina Malaysia.
- Committee member of Persatuan Seni Pertuturan Cina Malaysia.
- Coach of Multimedia University Cross Talk class.
- Committee member of Pay Fong High School Alumni, Melaka
- Deputy Chief Lam Ann Association, youth section
- Legal advisor of temple Seck Kia Eenh
- Legal advisor of Judo Association, Melaka
- Legal advisor of Pertubuhan Belia Nian Shao Qing, Melaka
- Legal Advisor of Melaka Line Dance Association.
- Auditor of Alumni S.R.J.K (c) Siang Lin.
- Secretary for Persatuan Ahklak Chi Kak Kok, Melaka.
- Member for the Board of Director for S.R.J.K (c) Yu Ying, Semabok
- Legal Advisor for Tokong Lian Puan Gong, Semabok
- Legal Advisor for Tae Kwon Do (MGTF), Melaka
- Legal Advisor for Tae Kwon Do ( MGTF), Daerah Melaka Tengah
- Legal Advisor for Persatuan Bulan Sabit Merah Cabang 63, Melaka
- Legal Advisor for Persatuan St. john, cabang Kubu, Melaka Tengah
- Legal Advisor for many temples in many places of Melaka
- Popularly invited as M.C or performing cross talk show for many functions (more than 100 events since year 2000) in and out of Melaka and Malaysia.
- Organising Chairman for Youth Buddhist Association Malaysia 2017 Dharma
- Organising Chairman for Chinese Assembly Hall 2017 3399 cultural event in Bukit Cina
- Acted in two local movies name Bird House and Filial. The movie has qualified for four international movie festival finalist in the year of 2007. Whereas the short movie “Filial” is very commonly blasted for education purpose, it reach fifty thousand plus view in YouTube since 2007 till todate.

== Election results ==
Malacca State Legislative Assembly
Year	Constituency	Candidate	Votes	Pct	Opponent(s)	Votes	Pct	Ballots cast	Majority	Turnout
2008	N20 Kota Laksamana	Lee Kiat Lee (MCA)	3,801	25.25%	Betty Chew Gek Cheng (DAP)	11,043	73.35%	15,055	7,242	79.53%
2018	N21 Duyong	Lee Kiat Lee (MCA)	4,747	30.85%	Damian Yeo Shen Li (DAP)	7,642	49.66%	15,601	2,895	86.15%
2018	N21 Duyong	Lee Kiat Lee (MCA)	4,747	30.85%	Kamarudin Sedik (PAS)	2,938	19.09%	15,601	2,895	86.15%
2018	N21 Duyong	Lee Kiat Lee (MCA)	4,747	30.85%	Lim Jak Wong (IND)	62	0.40%	15,601	2,895	86.15%
