= Sim Tong Him =

Malaysian politician (born 1948)

- 沈同钦

Member of the Malaysian Parliament for Kota Melaka
- In office 8 March 2008 – 9 May 2018
- Preceded by: Wong Nai Chee (BN–MCA)
- Succeeded by: Khoo Poay Tiong (PH–DAP)
- Majority: 11,390 (2008); 20,746 (2013)

Member of the Malacca State Legislative Assembly for Bandar Hilir
- In office 25 April 1995 – 21 April 2004
- Preceded by: Gan Boon Leong (BN–MCA)
- Succeeded by: Goh Leong San (PR–DAP)
- Majority: 1,516 (1995); 2,064 (1999)

Member of the Malacca State Legislative Assembly for Tranquerah (Tengkera)
- In office 1986–1995
- Preceded by: N/A
- Succeeded by: Goh Leong San (BA–DAP)
- Majority: 1,988 (1986); 3,135 (1990)

Personal details
- Born: 8 September 1948 (age 78) Malacca, Federation of Malaya (now Malaysia)
- Citizenship: Malaysian
- Party: Independent (2018–present); Democratic Action Party (DAP) (1982–2018)
- Children: 3
- Occupation: Politician
- Website: www.facebook.com/SimTongHimchenTongQin/

Sim Tong Him (simplified Chinese: 沈同钦; traditional Chinese: 沈同欽; pinyin: Shěn Tóngqīn; Pe̍h-ōe-jī: Sím Tông-khim; born 8 September 1948) is a Malaysian politician. He is the former Member of Parliament for Kota Melaka, Malacca for two terms from 2008 to 2018. Presently Sim is an independent politician after his resignation from Democratic Action Party (DAP) in 2017.

== Background ==
Sim is a relative of the prominent Malaysian Chinese educationist Datuk Sim Mow Yu.

== Political career ==
Sim joined the DAP in 1982. He contested the state constituency of Tranquerah, Malacca and won twice in 1986 general election and 1990 general election to become its assemblyman from 1986 to 1995 before switching to contest the state seat of Bandar Hilir, Malacca in 1995 general election and won again in the 1999 general election thus became its assemblyman from 1995 until 2004. In the 2004 general election, Sim contested the state seat of Ayer Keroh but lost.

Sim had been the DAP state chairman for Malacca until succeeded by Goh Leong San after a hotly contested internal state election on 19 December 2005, which also saw DAP secretary-general Lim Guan Eng and his wife Betty Chew get the lowest number of votes out of 15 candidates, thus causing Chew to lose her seat on the Malacca DAP committee entirely.

However he was chosen by DAP to contest the Kota Melaka parliamentary seat in the 2008 general election but he won by beating predecessor Wong Nai Chee of Malaysian Chinese Association (MCA) with a majority 11,390 vote and retained it again in the 2013 general election by beating Yee Kok Wah of MCA with a majority 20,746 vote. But on the 20 April nomination day of the election, beside registering as DAP official candidate to defend his Kota Melaka parliamentary seat, Sim made a surprise commotion by also registering to contest the Kota Laksamana state seat too but as an independent against DAP candidate concurrently, causing DAP to initially expel him. But only two days later on 22 April he announced his withdrawal as the state seat of Kota Laksamana Independent candidate to fully back the DAP candidate, Lai Keun Ban, instead and to focus to continue defend the Kota Melaka parliamentary seat under the DAP. As preparation for the voting day on 5 May already done by the Election Commission (EC), thus his candidacy still appeared on the ballots and managed to get 1,242 votes that finish last among three candidates and still had his deposit forfeited in the election.

On 17 September 2015, a doctor from Malacca who is also the Bukit Palah DAP branch chairman, Dr Wong Fort Pin, successfully sued Sim and Goh for defamation and won RM300,000 in damages. Both Sim and Goh party membership was suspended for one-year suspension on 16 February 2016, reportedly for disparaging the party.

On 12 February 2017, Sim, along with three other DAP Malacca state assemblymen namely Goh (Duyong), Lim Jack Wong (Bachang) and Chin Choong Seong (Kesidang) announced their resignation from the party to be Independent, citing lack of trust in DAP leadership. They formed the 'Justice League' to contest in the 2018 general election (GE14) as independent candidates using the key as their common symbol. Sim contested the Kota Laksamana state seat whereas Goh will go for both parliamentary (Kota Malacca) and state seat (Kesidang). Lim and Chin will contest the Ayer Keroh and Bandar Hilir state seats respectively. In the GE14, Sim officially contested first time as independent candidate for the state seat of Kota Laksamana but lost.

== Election results ==
Malacca State Legislative Assembly
Year	Constituency	Candidate	Votes	Pct	Opponent(s)	Votes	Pct	Ballots cast	Majority	Turnout
1986	N13 Tranquerah	Sim Tong Him (DAP)	8,267	55.17%	Ng Peng Hong @ Ng Peng Hay (MCA)	6,279	41.90%	14,984	1,988	77.76%
1986	N13 Tranquerah	Sim Tong Him (DAP)	8,267	55.17%	Thei Niu Kim (PPPM)	104	0.69%	14,984	1,988	77.76%
1990	N13 Tranquerah	Sim Tong Him (DAP)	9,142	57.86%	Khoo Heng Peng (MCA)	6,007	38.02%	15,799	3,135	78.02%
1990	N13 Tranquerah	Sim Tong Him (DAP)	9,142	57.86%	Loo Kin (IND)	374	2.37%	15,799	3,135	78.02%
1995	N18 Bandar Hilir	Sim Tong Him (DAP)	6,445	54.98%	Boon Ah Soo (MCA)	4,929	42.05%	11,722	1,516	75.18%
1999	N18 Bandar Hilir	Sim Tong Him (DAP)	6,835	57.65%	Ng Peng Ann (MCA)	4,771	40.24%	11,855	2,064	74.69%
2004	N16 Ayer Keroh	Sim Tong Him (DAP)	6,562	39.41%	Seah Kwi Tong (MCA)	9,549	57.36%	16,649	2,987	80.12%
2013	N20 Kota Laksamana	Sim Tong Him (IND)^{[A]}	1,242	7.35%	Lai Keun Ban (DAP)	11,969	70.85%	16,893	8,507	86%
2013	N20 Kota Laksamana	Sim Tong Him (IND)^{[A]}	1,242	7.35%	Chiw Tiang Chai (MyPPP)	3,462	20.49%	16,893	8,507	86%
2018	N20 Kota Laksamana	Sim Tong Him (IND)^{[B]}	517	1.7%	Low Chee Leong (DAP)	20,181	67.40%	24,952	16,173	83.30%
2018	N20 Kota Laksamana	Sim Tong Him (IND)^{[B]}	517	1.7%	Melvin Chua Kew Wei (MCA)	4,008	13.4%	24,952	16,173	83.30%

^{A} Sim who surprisingly registered as an independent candidate on nomination day but withdrew later to support DAP named candidate, still had his candidacy appeared on the EC voting ballot officially.
^{B} Sim and three others MLA who had quit DAP Malacca earlier, had formed the 'Justice League' informal Independent bloc and contested as Independent candidates using the key symbol.

Parliament of Malaysia
Year	Constituency	Candidate	Votes	Pct	Opponent(s)	Votes	Pct	Ballots cast	Majority	Turnout
2008	P138 Kota Melaka	Sim Tong Him (DAP)	38,640	57.26%	Wong Nai Chee (MCA)	27,250	40.38%	67,479	11,390	79.57%
2013	P138 Kota Melaka	Sim Tong Him (DAP)	49,521	62.17%	Yee Kok Wah (MCA)	28,775	36.13%	79,651	20,746	86.30%
