= Allex Seah Shoo Chin =

Malaysian politician, data analyst and engineer

Yang Berhormat Tuan Allex Seah Shoo Chin MLA
- 谢守钦

Member of the Malacca State Executive Council (Entrepreneur Development, Cooperatives and Consumer Affairs)
- In office 5 April 2023 – 14 July 2026
- Governor: Mohd Ali Rustam
- Deputy: Tuminah Kadi
- Chief Minister: Ab Rauf Yusoh
- Preceded by: Ab Rauf Yusoh (Senior Member, Entrepreneur Development and Cooperatives); Ngwe Hee Sem (Consumer Affairs)
- Succeeded by: TBD
- Constituency: Kesidang

Member of the Malacca State Legislative Assembly for Kesidang
- Incumbent
- Assumed office 9 May 2018
- Preceded by: Chin Choong Seong (PR–DAP)
- Majority: 14,612 (2018); 10,237 (2021); 9,352 (2026)

State Secretary of the Democratic Action Party of Malacca
- Incumbent
- Assumed office 24 January 2022
- Secretary-General: Lim Guan Eng (2022); Anthony Loke Siew Fook (since 2022)
- State Chairman: Damian Yeo Shen Li (2022–2023); Tey Kok Kiew (2023–2024); Khoo Poay Tiong (since 2024)
- Assistant: Lim Kwok Thuan (2022–2024); Teng Wen Jie (since 2024)
- Preceded by: Damian Yeo Shen Li

Faction represented in Malacca State Legislative Assembly
- 2018–: Pakatan Harapan

Personal details
- Born: Allex Seah Shoo Chin; 21 May 1983 (age 43) Malacca, Malaysia
- Citizenship: Malaysian
- Party: Democratic Action Party (DAP)
- Other political affiliations: Pakatan Harapan (PH)
- Children: 3 (2 sons & 1 daughter)
- Occupation: Politician
- Profession: Data analyst; engineer
- Allex Seah Shoo Chin on Facebook

Allex Seah Shoo Chin

Chinese name
- Traditional Chinese: 謝守欽
- Simplified Chinese: 谢守钦
Transcriptions
Standard Mandarin
- Hanyu Pinyin: Xiè Shǒuqīn

Allex Seah Shoo Chin (simplified Chinese: 谢守钦; traditional Chinese: 謝守欽; pinyin: Xiè Shǒuqīn; born 21 May 1983) is a Malaysian politician, data analyst and engineer who has served as Member of the Malacca State Legislative Assembly (MLA) for Kesidang since May 2018. He served as Member of the Malacca State Executive Council (EXCO) in the Barisan Nasional (BN) state administration under Chief Minister Ab Rauf Yusoh from April 2023 to his resignation in July 2026. He is a member of the Democratic Action Party (DAP), a component party of the Pakatan Harapan (PH) coalition. He has served as State Secretary of the DAP of Malacca since January 2022. He is presently the sole Melaka EXCO Member of PH and DAP.

== Political career ==
=== Member of the Melaka State Legislative Assembly (since 2018) ===
In the 2018 Malacca state election, Seah was nominated by his party DAP to contest for the Kesidang state seat. He defeated another candidate and Goh Leong San who contested as an independent candidate and was previously a DAP member before the election. He was elected to the Melaka State Legislative Assembly as the Kesidang MLA for the first term.

In the 2021 Melaka state election, Seah was renominated to defend the Kesidang state seat. He again defeated other candidates of BN and Perikatan Nasional (PN) and reelected as the Kesidang NLA for the second term.

=== State Secretary of Democratic Action Party of Melaka (since 2022) ===
On 24 January 2022, Seah was appointed as State Secretary of DAP of Melaka, taking over from Damian Yeo Shen Li who was earlier named as the State Chairman to replace Tey Kok Kiew, who resigned from the position to assume responsibility for the defeat of the party in the 2021 Melaka state election. During the Melaka DAP State Convention on 24 November 2024, Seah was reappointed as the State Secretary.

=== Member of the Melaka State Executive Council (since 2023) ===
On 5 April 2023, Seah was appointed as Member of the Melaka State EXCO in charge of Entrepreneur Development, Cooperatives and Consumer Affairs by Chief Minister Ab Rauf. His appointment also formed a state coalition government between BN and PH as he as the only PH MLA and 9 BN MLAs formed the Ab Rauf EXCO lineup. On 19 April 2023, he praised the hypermarkets and supermarkets in Melaka who took the Menu Rahmah initiative to offer cheaper and more affordable prices of essential items that led consumers to lower expenditure. He also assured that the supply of the essential items was enough throughout the Hari Raya festive season.

== Personal life ==
Seah is married. Seah and his wife have three children who are two sons and a daughter.

== Election results ==
Malacca State Legislative Assembly
Year	Constituency	Candidate	Votes	Pct	Opponent(s)	Votes	Pct	Ballots cast	Majority	Turnout
2018	N19 Kesidang	Allex Seah Shoo Chin (DAP)	22,880	72.64%	Ng Choon Koon (MCA)	8,268	26.25%	31,497	14,612	85.58%
2018	N19 Kesidang	Allex Seah Shoo Chin (DAP)	22,880	72.64%	Goh Leong San (IND)	349	1.11%	31,497	14,612	85.58%
2021	N19 Kesidang	Allex Seah Shoo Chin (DAP)	14,769	65.86%	Leong Hui Ying (MCA)	4,532	20.21%	22,425	10,237	61.08%
2021	N19 Kesidang	Allex Seah Shoo Chin (DAP)	14,769	65.86%	Patrick Ng Chin Kae (GERAKAN)	3,124	13.93%	22,425	10,237	61.08%
2026	N19 Kesidang	Allex Seah Shoo Chin (DAP)	21,986	60.03%	Albert Kok Boon Chang (WAWASAN)	12,634	34.50%	36,623	9,352	67.20%
2026	N19 Kesidang	Allex Seah Shoo Chin (DAP)	21,986	60.03%	Bryan Kek Kit Hun (BERSAMA)	2,003	5.47%	36,623	9,352	67.20%
