= Leng Chau Yen =

Malaysian politician

Yang Berhormat Puan Leng Chau Yen MLA
- 林朝雁

Deputy Member of the Malacca State Executive Council (Women, Family and Community Development)
- In office 6 April 2023 – 14 July 2026
- Governor: Mohd Ali Rustam
- Chief Minister: Ab Rauf Yusoh
- Member: Kalsom Noordin
- Preceded by: Position established
- Succeeded by: TBD
- Constituency: Bandar Hilir

Member of the Malacca State Legislative Assembly for Bandar Hilir
- Incumbent
- Assumed office 20 November 2021
- Preceded by: Tey Kok Kiew (PH–DAP)
- Majority: 7,778 (2021); 7,857 (2026)

State Vice Chairperson of the Democratic Action Party of Malacca
- Incumbent
- Assumed office 25 January 2022 Serving with Khoo Poay Tiong (2022–2024); Chandru Suparmaniam (since 2024)
- Secretary-General: Lim Guan Eng (2022); Anthony Loke Siew Fook (since 2022)
- State Chairman: Damian Yeo Shen Li (2022–2023); Tey Kok Kiew (2023–2024); Khoo Poay Tiong (since 2024)

Faction represented in the Malacca State Legislative Assembly
- 2021–: Pakatan Harapan

Personal details
- Born: Leng Chau Yen; 14 November 1984 (age 42) Malacca, Malaysia
- Citizenship: Malaysia
- Party: Democratic Action Party (DAP) (since 2012)
- Other political affiliations: Pakatan Harapan (PH)
- Spouse: Teh Chean Loong (m. 2011)
- Education: New Era University
- Occupation: Politician
- Leng Chau Yen on Facebook

Leng Chau Yen (Chinese: 林朝雁; pinyin: Lín Cháoyàn; born 14 November 1984) is a Malaysian politician who has served as Member of the Malacca State Legislative Assembly (MLA) for Bandar Hilir since November 2021. She served as Deputy Member of the Malacca State Executive Council (EXCO) in the Barisan Nasional (BN) state administration under Chief Minister Ab Rauf Yusoh and Member Kalsom Noordin from April 2023 to her resignation in July 2026. She is a member of the Democratic Action Party (DAP), a component party of the Pakatan Harapan (PH) coalition. She has served as State Vice Chairperson of the DAP of Malacca since January 2022 and Women Chief of DAP of Kota Melaka since 2020. She was one of the only two Melaka Deputy EXCO Members of PH and DAP along with Low Chee Leong and the sole female Malacca MLA of PH and DAP. She also served as the State Publicity Secretary of DAP of Malacca from 2018 to her promotion to the vice chairpersonship in 2022, Political Secretary and Special Officer to former Malacca EXCO Member and Bandar Hilir MLA Tey Kok Kiew from 2013 to 2021, Division Youth Publicity Secretary of DAP of Kota Melaka in 2014, Division Youth Secretary of DAP of Kota Melaka from 2015 to 2016, Branch Secretary of the DAP of Kampung Hilir from 2014 to 2016, State Assistant Secretary of DAP of Malacca from 2016 to 2018, State Women Secretary of DAP of Malacca from 2017 to 2019 and State Youth Vice Chief of DAP of Malacca from 2017 to 2019.

== Political career ==
=== Member of the Malacca State Legislative Assembly (since 2021) ===
In the 2021 Malacca state election, Leng made her electoral debut after being nominated by PH to contest for the Bandar Hilir state seat, taking over Malacca DAP Chairman Tey Kok Kiew who switched to the Bemban state seat. She won the seat and was elected to the Malacca State Legislative Assembly as the Bandar Hilir MLA for the first term after defeating Lee Kah Sean of BN, Clarice Chan Ming Wang of Perikatan Nasional (PN) and independent candidate Mak Chee Kin by a majority of 7,778 votes.

=== State Vice Chairperson of the Democratic Action Party of Malacca (since 2022) ===
On 25 January 2022, she was appointed as State Vice Chairperson of DAP of Malacca.

=== Deputy Member of the Malacca State Executive Council (since 2023) ===
On 6 April 2023, Leng was appointed by Chief Minister Ab Rauf as the Deputy EXCO Member in charge of Women, Family and Community Development, deputising for EXCO Member Kalsom Noordin.

== Election results ==
Malacca State Legislative Assembly
Year	Constituency	Candidate	Votes	Pct	Opponent(s)	Votes	Pct	Ballots cast	Majority	Turnout
2021	N21 Bandar Hilir	Leng Chau Yen (DAP)	9,091	81.19%	Lee Kah Sean (MCA)	1,313	11.72%	11,197	7,778	57.55%
2021	N21 Bandar Hilir	Leng Chau Yen (DAP)	9,091	81.19%	Clarice Chan Ming Wang (Gerakan)	634	5.66%	11,197	7,778	57.55%
2021	N21 Bandar Hilir	Leng Chau Yen (DAP)	9,091	81.19%	Mak Chee Kin (IND)	159	1.42%	11,197	7,778	57.55%
2026	N21 Bandar Hilir	Leng Chau Yen (DAP)	9,942	74.52%	Jasmine Lok Huey Yee (MCA)	2,085	15.63%	13,342	7,857	57.90%
2026	N21 Bandar Hilir	Leng Chau Yen (DAP)	9,942	74.52%	Mohd Nor Rashidi Ab Jalil (BERSAMA)	1,315	9.86%	13,342	7,857	57.90%
