= Koh Nai Kwong =

Malaysian politician

Yang Berhormat Senator Datuk Wira Koh Nai Kwong DCSM
- 古乃光
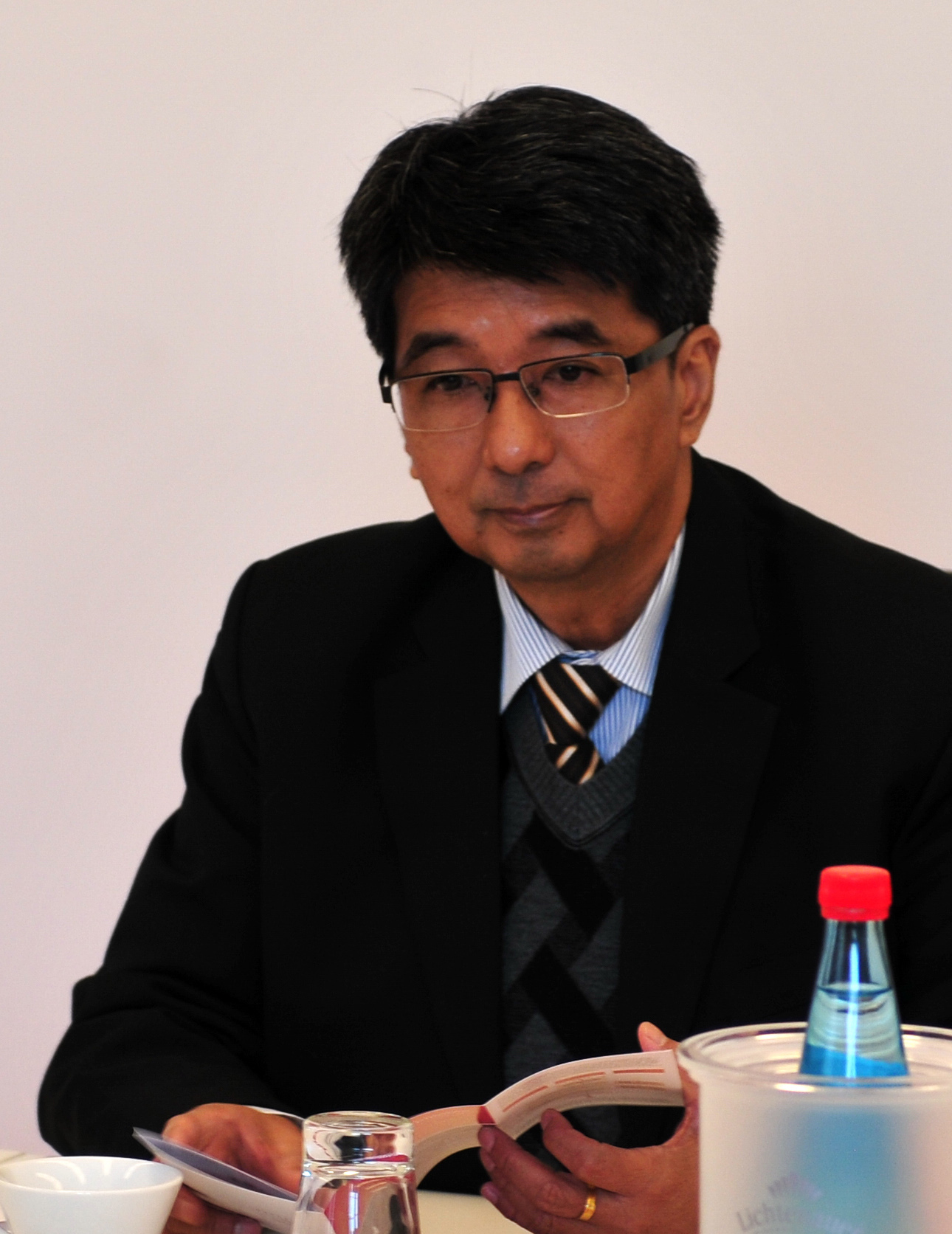
- Koh Nai Kwong (2014)

Senator Elected by the Malacca State Legislative Assembly
- Incumbent
- Assumed office 6 March 2024 Serving with Mustafa Musa
- Monarch: Ibrahim
- Prime Minister: Anwar Ibrahim
- Preceded by: Himself
- In office 10 December 2020 – 9 December 2023 Serving with Mohamad Ali Mohamad (2020–2023); Mustafa Musa (2023)
- Monarch: Abdullah
- Prime Minister: Muhyiddin Yassin (2020–2021); Ismail Sabri Yaakob (2021–2022); Anwar Ibrahim (2022–2023)
- Preceded by: Lee Tian Sing
- Succeeded by: Himself

Member of the Malaysian Parliament for Alor Gajah
- In office 5 May 2013 – 9 May 2018
- Preceded by: Fong Chan Onn (BN–MCA)
- Succeeded by: Mohd Redzuan Md Yusof (PH–BERSATU)
- Majority: 11,597 (2013)

Member of the Malacca State Executive Council

(Housing, Local Government, Environment and Transportation)
- In office 2007–2008
- Governor: Mohd Khalil Yaakob
- Chief Minister: Mohd Ali Rustam
- Constituency: Kesidang

Member of the Malacca State Legislative Assembly for Kesidang
- In office 21 March 2004 – 8 March 2008
- Preceded by: Position established
- Succeeded by: Goh Leong San (PR–DAP)
- Majority: 1,701 (2004)

Faction represented in Dewan Negara
- 2020–2023, 2024–: Barisan Nasional

Faction represented in Dewan Rakyat
- 2013–2018: Barisan Nasional

Faction represented in the Malacca State Legislative Assembly
- 2004–2008: Barisan Nasional

Personal details
- Born: Koh Nai Kwong; 28 February 1961 (age 65) Pandan Jaya, Malacca Town, Malacca, Federation of Malaya (now Malaysia)
- Party: Malaysian Chinese Association (MCA)
- Other political affiliations: Barisan Nasional (BN)
- Education: University of Wales (LLB (Hons))
- Occupation: Politician
- Profession: Lawyer
- Website: ybhgdatukkohnaikwong.blogspot

Koh Nai Kwong (Chinese: 古乃光; pinyin: Gǔ Nǎiguāng; Pe̍h-ōe-jī: Kó͘ Nái-kong; born 28 February 1961) is a Malaysian politician and lawyer who has served as a Senator since March 2024 and from December 2020 to December 2023. He served as Member of the Malacca State Executive Council (EXCO) in the Barisan Nasional (BN) state administration under former Chief Minister Mohd Ali Rustam from 2007 to 2008, Member of Parliament (MP) for Alor Gajah from May 2013 to May 2018 and Member of the Malacca State Legislative Assembly (MLA) for Kesidang from March 2004 to March 2008. He is a member, the State Deputy Chairman and the Division Chief of Hang Tuah Jaya of the Malaysian Chinese Association (MCA), a component party of the BN coalition. He was also the State Legal Advisor to BN of Malacca from 2006 to 2011.

== Political career ==
=== Member of the Malacca State Legislative Assembly (2004–2008) ===
==== 2004 Malacca state election ====
In the 2004 Malacca state election, Koh made his electoral debut after being nominated by BN to contest for the Kesidang state seat. He was elected to the Malacca State Legislative Assembly as Kesidang MLA for the first term after defeating Lim Jak Wong of the Democratic Action Party (DAP) by a majority of 1,701 votes.

=== Member of the Malacca State Executive Council (2007–2008) ===
In 2007, Koh was appointed as Member of the Malacca State EXCO in charge of Housing, Local Government, Environment and Transportation by Chief Minister Mohd Ali. In 2008, he lost the position after he was not reelected as an MLA in the 2008 Malacca state election.

=== Candidate for the Member of the Malacca State Legislative Assembly (2008 & 2018) ===
==== 2008 Malacca state election ====
In the 2008 Malacca state election, Koh was renominated by BN to defend the Kesidang seat. He lost the seat and was not reelected as the Kesidang MLA for the second term after losing to Goh Leong San of the Pakatan Rakyat (PR) by a minority of 1,399 votes.

==== 2018 Malacca state election ====
In the 2018 Malacca state election, Koh was renominated by BN to contest for the Machap Jaya state seat instead of defending the Alor Gajah seat. He was not elected as the Machap Jaya MLA after losing to Ginie Lim Siew Lin of the Pakatan Harapan (PH) by a minority of 1,336 votes.

=== Member of Parliament (2013–2018) ===
==== 2013 general election ====
In the 2013 general election, Koh was renominated by BN to contest for the Alor Gajah federal seat. He won the seat and was elected to the Parliament as the Alor Gajah MP after defeating Damian Yeo Shen Li of the PR by the majority of 11,597 votes.

=== Senatorship (2020-2023, 2024-now) ===
On 21 December 2020, Koh was elected to the Parliament as the Senator representing Malacca after being nominated and approved by the Malacca State Legislative Assembly. His term ended on 9 December 2023 and was reappointed for a second term in March 2024.

== Election results ==
Malacca State Legislative Assembly
Year	Constituency	Candidate	Votes	Pct	Opponent(s)	Votes	Pct	Ballots cast	Majority	Turnout
2004	N19 Kesidang	Koh Nai Kwong (MCA)	6,846	55.94%	Lim Jak Wong (DAP)	5,145	42.04%	12,239	1,701	78.95%
2008	N19 Kesidang	Koh Nai Kwong (MCA)	5,842	43.84%	Goh Leong San (DAP)	7,241	54.34%	13,325	1,399	80.89%
2018	N08 Machap Jaya	Koh Nai Kwong (MCA)	4,214	33.10%	Ginie Lim Siew Lin (PKR)	5,550	43.60%	10,718	1,336	84.30%
2018	N08 Machap Jaya	Koh Nai Kwong (MCA)	4,214	33.10%	Wan Zahidi Wan Ismail (PAS)	775	6.10%	10,718	1,336	84.30%

Parliament of Malaysia
Year	Constituency	Candidate	Votes	Pct	Opponent(s)	Votes	Pct	Ballots cast	Majority	Turnout
2013	P135 Alor Gajah	Koh Nai Kwong (MCA)	32,594	60.82%	Damian Yeo Shen Li (DAP)	20,997	39.18%	55,131	11,597	86.70%

== Honours ==
- Malaysia
  - Recipient of the 17th Yang di-Pertuan Agong Installation Medal (2024)
- Malacca
  - Knight Commander of the Exalted Order of Malacca (DCSM) – Datuk Wira (2017)
  - Companion Class I of the Exalted Order of Malacca (DMSM) – Datuk (2009)
  - Member of the Exalted Order of Malacca (DSM) (2001)

== See also ==
- Members of the Dewan Negara, 14th Malaysian Parliament
- Members of the Dewan Negara, 15th Malaysian Parliament
- List of people who have served in both Houses of the Malaysian Parliament
