= Taman ASEAN =

Coordinates: 2°14′N 102°13′E

Taman ASEAN is a township in Melaka, Malaysia. This township is located at AMJ Highway between Cheng, Pokok Mangga and Malim Jaya. It has 9 associations.
