= Tey Kok Kiew =

Malaysian politician

Yang Berbahagia Datuk Tey Kok Kiew DMSM
- 郑国球

Member of the Malacca State Executive Council
- In office 16 May 2018 – 2 March 2020 (Housing, Local Government and Environment)
- Governor: Mohd Khalil Yaakob
- Chief Minister: Adly Zahari
- Preceded by: Ismail Othman
- Succeeded by: Abdul Ghafar Atan
- Constituency: Bandar Hilir

Member of the Malacca State Legislative Assembly for Bandar Hilir
- In office 8 March 2008 – 20 November 2021
- Preceded by: Goh Leong San (DAP)
- Succeeded by: Leng Chau Yen (PH–DAP)
- Majority: 4,912 (2008); 7,952 (2013); 11,313 (2018)

State Chairman of the Democratic Action Party of Malacca
- In office 12 January 2023 – 7 June 2024
- Deputy: Saminathan Ganesan
- Secretary-General: Anthony Loke Siew Fook
- Preceded by: Damian Yeo Shen Li
- Succeeded by: Khoo Poay Tiong
- In office 13 December 2015 – 21 November 2021
- Secretary-General: Lim Guan Eng
- Preceded by: Goh Leong San
- Succeeded by: Damian Yeo Shen Li

Faction represented in Malacca State Legislative Assembly
- 2008–2018: Democratic Action Party
- 2018–2021: Pakatan Harapan

Personal details
- Born: 18 January 1972 (age 54) Pantai Belimbing, Alor Gajah, Malacca, Malaysia
- Citizenship: Malaysian
- Party: Democratic Action Party (DAP)
- Other political affiliations: Pakatan Harapan (PH)
- Occupation: Politician
- Tey Kok Kiew on Facebook

Tey Kok Kiew (Chinese: 鄭國球; Jyutping: Zeng6 Gwok3 Kau4; Pe̍h-ōe-jī: Tēⁿ Kok-kiû) is a Malaysian politician who served as Member of the Malacca State Executive Council (EXCO) in the Pakatan Harapan (PH) state administration under former Chief Minister Adly Zahari from May 2018 to the collapse of the PH state administration in March 2020 as well as Member of the Malacca State Legislative Assembly (MLA) for Bandar Hilir from March 2008 to November 2021. He is a member from Democratic Action Party (DAP), a component party of the PH coalition. He served as State Chairman of DAP of Malacca for the first term from December 2015 to his resignation in November 2021 following a huge defeat of DAP in the 2021 Malacca state election and the second term from January 2023 to his resignation again in June 2024.

== Politics ==
Tey initially contested as a DAP candidate in the 2008 Malacca state election for the Bandar Hilir state seat in 2008 and went on to defend the seat in the 2013 and 2018 Melaka state elections. Tey was fielded by the party to spearhead the DAP younger faces in the subsequent 2021 Malacca state election as the PH candidate replacing the incumbent Wong Fort Pin who was however dropped to contest Bemban seat which was considered a more risky election for DAP and Tey.

== Controversies and issues ==
In 2018, DAP secretary-general Lim Guan Eng had rebuked Tey, the DAP Malacca chief and Wong, the Deputy Speaker of Malacca State Legislative Assembly and assemblyman of Bemban then on their acceptance of the Malacca state "Datukship" in their first year as MLA which had breached the party's long-standing principal agreed upon since the mid-1990s on DAP elected representatives not to receive honours awards during their active political service period. Lim called for those involved to apologise which Wong had obliged and even offered to return the award but Tey did not and remained adamant. Tey opined the party should have inform the King, state rulers or governors for such principal policy.

== Election results ==
Malacca State Legislative Assembly
Year	Constituency	Candidate	Votes	Pct	Opponent(s)	Votes	Pct	Ballots cast	Majority	Turnout%
2008	N22 Bandar Hilir	Tey Kok Kiew (DAP)	9,591	67.21%	Chock Choon Sin (MCA)	4,679	32.79%	14,421	4,912	76.83%
2013	N22 Bandar Hilir	Tey Kok Kiew (DAP)	11,754	75.56%	Ronald Gan Yong Hoe (MCA)	3,802	24.44%	15,756	7,952	83.20%
2018	N22 Bandar Hilir	Tey Kok Kiew (DAP)	14,038	83.05%	Lee Chong Leng (MCA)	2,725	16.12%	17,602	11,313	83.90%
2018	N22 Bandar Hilir	Tey Kok Kiew (DAP)	14,038	83.05%	Chin Choong Seong (IND)	141	0.83%	17,602	11,313	83.90%
2021	N24 Bemban	Tey Kok Kiew (DAP)	3,095	25.43%	Mohd Yadzil Yaakub (BERSATU)	4,211	34.60%	12,169	328	65.52%
2021	N24 Bemban	Tey Kok Kiew (DAP)	3,095	25.43%	Koh Chin Han (MCA)	3,883	31.92%	12,169	328	65.52%
2021	N24 Bemban	Tey Kok Kiew (DAP)	3,095	25.43%	Ng Choon Koon (IND)	850	6.98%	12,169	328	65.52%
2021	N24 Bemban	Tey Kok Kiew (DAP)	3,095	25.43%	Azmi Kamis (IND)	130	1.07%	12,169	328	65.52%

== Honours ==
=== Honours of Malaysia ===
- Malacca
  - Companion Class I of the Exalted Order of Malacca (DMSM) – Datuk (2018)
