= Goh Leong San =

Malaysian politician

- 吴良山

Member of the Malacca State Legislative Assembly for Duyong
- In office 5 May 2013 – 9 May 2018
- Preceded by: Gan Tian Loo (BN–MCA)
- Succeeded by: Damian Yeo Shen Li (PH–DAP)
- Majority: 205 (2013)

Member of the Malacca State Legislative Assembly for Kesidang (formerly Tengkera)
- In office 8 March 2008 – 5 May 2013
- Preceded by: Koh Nai Kwong (BN–MCA)
- Succeeded by: Chin Choong Seong (PR–DAP)
- Majority: 1,399 (2008)

Member of the Malacca State Legislative Assembly for Bandar Hilir
- In office 21 March 2004 – 8 March 2008
- Preceded by: Sim Tong Him (BA–DAP)
- Succeeded by: Tey Kok Kiew (PR–DAP)
- Majority: 356 (2004)

Member of the Malacca State Legislative Assembly for Tengkera (formerly Tranquerah)
- In office 25 April 1995 – 21 March 2004
- Preceded by: Sim Tong Him (GR–DAP)
- Succeeded by: (change to Kesidang) Koh Nai Kwong (BN–MCA)
- Majority: 1,189 (1995)

State Chairman of Democratic Action Party of the Malacca
- In office 19 December 2005 – 14 December 2015
- Preceded by: Sim Tong Him
- Succeeded by: Tey Kok Kiew

Personal details
- Born: 15 November 1967 (age 58) Malacca, Malaysia
- Party: Malaysian United Party (BERSAMA) (2026–present); Independent (2017–2026); Democratic Action Party (DAP) (1994–2017)
- Other political affiliations: Pakatan Harapan (PH) (2015-2017); Pakatan Rakyat (PR) (2008-2015); Barisan Alternatif (BA) (1999-2004); Gagasan Rakyat (GR) (1994-1996)
- Children: 3
- Education: University of Science Malaysia
- Occupation: Politician

Goh Leong San
- Traditional Chinese: 吳良山
- Simplified Chinese: 吴良山
Transcriptions
Standard Mandarin
- Hanyu Pinyin: Wú Liángshān
Southern Min
- Hokkien POJ: Gô͘ Liôngsan

Goh Leong San (simplified Chinese: 吴良山; traditional Chinese: 吳良山; pinyin: Wú Liángshān; Pe̍h-ōe-jī: Gô͘ Liông-san; born 15 November 1967) is a Malaysian politician. Goh is a former Malacca State Legislative Assemblyman (MLA) for several Malacca state constituencies; Tengkera (1995-2004), Bandar Hilir (2004-2008), Kesidang (2008-2013) and Duyong (2013-2018).

Goh is a member of the Malaysian United Party (BERSAMA) and was a member of the Democratic Action Party (DAP) until 2017. He was previously the state chairman for Malacca and also Central Executive Committee member for DAP.

== Early life and education ==
Goh was born on 15 November 1967 in Malacca. His name, Leong San, literally means "Hero of Mount Liang" in Chinese, a name that also was used in the famous Chinese classical novel Water Margin.

He completed his tertiary education at Universiti Sains Malaysia (USM) obtaining the Bachelor of Science and Master of Science in Chemistry. He then became a chemist and household products manufacturer.

== Political career ==
Goh had joined the DAP in 1994. He contested the constituency of Tengkera twice and won in 1995 and 1999 to become its assemblyman from 1995 to 2004 before switching to contest the seat Bandar Hilir, Malacca in 2004 election.

Goh ascended to the DAP Malacca State Chief in 2005, succeeding his mentor Sim Tong Him. Goh had secured 85 votes in the hotly contested party internal election, which also saw DAP secretary-general Lim Guan Eng and his wife Betty Chew unexpectedly got the lowest number of votes out of 15 candidates, thus causing Chew to lose her seat on the Malacca DAP committee entirely. Chew was "saddened by the results", but said she accepted her defeat. However, Teresa Kok, a DAP Member of Parliament (MP), suggested there was a conspiracy behind the defeat of Lim and Chew in their re-election campaigns. Both Goh and Sim DAP membership was suspended for one-year suspension on 16 February 2016, reportedly for disparaging the party. Goh was initially alleged to turn Independent assemblyman but somehow refuted by DAP which maintained he was still a member under suspension of the party later.

In the 2008 election, Goh at age 40 continued to run for state assemblyman seat and had won again against incumbent Koh Nai Kwong of MCA-BN in the electoral constituency of Kesidang with margin of 1,399 votes

In the 2013 election, he faced off against Gan Tian Loo from MCA-BN for the Duyong, Malacca state seat and won again, though by a much smaller margin of just 205 votes. He however later resigned as state opposition leader in October 2013.

Goh himself was ousted as the state DAP chief on 14 December 2015 by the newly-elected state committee that had selected Tey Kok Kiew instead.

On 12 February 2017, Goh along with Sim, MP for Kota Melaka and two other Malacca state assemblymen namely Lim Jack Wong of Bachang, and Chin Choong Seong of Kesidang finally decided and announced their resignation from the DAP to be Independents, citing lack of trust in the party leadership. They later had formed an independent candidates bloc called 'Justice League' to contest in the 2018 election (GE14) using the key as their common symbol but all had lost. In the elections, Goh contested as independent candidate the parliamentary constituency of Kota Melaka and state constituency of Bandar Hilir concurrently but had lost both constituencies.

Hence, even though Goh never got to be an MP of Dewan Rakyat, he had become a five-term assemblyman of various state seats from 2004 until 2018.

== Controversies ==
On 17 September 2015, Dr. Wong Fort Pin, the Bukit Palah DAP branch chairman who is also a doctor then, successfully sued Goh with Sim for defamation because of libelous media statements they have issued to implicate him in outraging the modesty of his patients and also accused his sibling of being involved in illegal activities. He won RM300,000 in damages.

== Personal life ==
Goh is married and a father of three children.

== Election results ==
Malacca State Legislative Assembly
Year	Constituency	Candidate	Votes	Pct	Opponent(s)	Votes	Pct	Ballots cast	Majority	Turnout
1995	N16 Tengkera	Goh Leong San (DAP)	6,797	53.63%	Lim Her Leng @ Lim Kok Jerk (MCA)	5,608	44.24%	12,675	2,451	77.07%
1999	N16 Tengkera	Goh Leong San (DAP)	7,618	56.36%	Soon Tian Szu (MCA)	5,634	41.70%	13,511	1,984	78.23%
2004	N22 Bandar Hilir	Goh Leong San (DAP)	7,273	49.74%	Chock Choon Sin (MCA)	6,917	47.31%	14,622	356	75.40%
2008	N19 Kesidang	Goh Leong San (DAP)	7,241	54.34%	Koh Nai Kwong (MCA)	5,842	43.84%	13,325	1,399	80.89%
2013	N21 Duyong	Goh Leong San (DAP)	7,997	49.98%	Gan Tian Loo (MCA)	7,792	48.70%	16,055	205	87.60%
2018	N19 Kesidang	Goh Leong San (IND)	349	0.90%	Allex Seah Shoo Chin (DAP)	22,880	61.30%	31,970	14,612	85.60%
2018	N19 Kesidang	Goh Leong San (IND)	349	0.90%	Ng Choon Koon (MCA)	8,268	22.10%	31,970	14,612	85.60%

Parliament of Malaysia
Year	Constituency	Candidate	Votes	Pct	Opponent(s)	Votes	Pct	Ballots cast	Majority	Turnout
2004	P135 Alor Gajah	Goh Leong San (DAP)	7,372	18.74%	Fong Chan Onn (MCA)	29,920	76.05%	39,343	22,548	76.26%
2018	P138 Kota Melaka	Goh Leong San (IND)	1,415	1.34%	Khoo Poay Tiong (DAP)	76,518	72.69%	107,085	49,175	84.42%
2018	P138 Kota Melaka	Goh Leong San (IND)	1,415	1.34%	Choo Wei Sern (MCA)	27,343	25.97%	107,085	49,175	84.42%
