= Bandar Hilir (state constituency) =

Political subdivision in Malaysia

Bandar Hilir (N22)
Malacca constituency

State constituency
- Legislature: Malacca State Legislative Assembly
MLA
Leng Chau Yen
PH
- Constituency created: 1974
- First contested: 1974
- Last contested: 2026

Demographics
- Electors (2026): 23,042

N22 Bandar Hilir within Malacca, as used for the 2021 state election

Bandar Hilir is a state constituency in Malacca, Malaysia, that has been represented in the Malacca State Legislative Assembly.

== Demographics ==
Ethnic breakdown of Bandar Hilir's electorate as of 2026
1. Chinese (73.9%)
2. Malays (11.4%)
3. Other Ethnicities (7.90%)
4. Indians (6.70%)

== History ==
=== Polling districts ===
According to the gazette issued on 5 November 2026, the Bandar Hilir constituency has a total of 10 polling districts.

State constituency	Polling districts	Code	Location
Bandar Hilir (N22)	Bunga Raya	138/22/01	SMK Tinggi Perempuan Melaka
Bandar Hilir (N22)	Bukit China	138/22/02	SK Bukit China
Bandar Hilir (N22)	Bukit Gedong	138/22/03	SK Seri Bandar
Bandar Hilir (N22)	Bandar Kaba	138/22/04	SMK St. Francis
Bandar Hilir (N22)	Bandar Hilir Tengah	138/22/05	SMK Infant Jesus Convent
Bandar Hilir (N22)	Lorong Panjang	138/22/06	SJK (C) Pay Fong 2
Bandar Hilir (N22)	Kg Bandar Hilir	138/22/07	SK Convent Infant Jesus 1
Bandar Hilir (N22)	Melaka Raya	138/22/08	SK Convent Infant Jesus 2
Bandar Hilir (N22)	Perkampungan Portugis	138/22/09	SMK Canossa Convent
Bandar Hilir (N22)	Ujong Pasir Pantai	138/22/10	SMK Canossa Convent

=== Representation history ===
Members of the Legislative Assembly for Bandar Hilir
Assembly	No	Years	Member	Party
Constituency created from Kota Timor, Kota Selatan and Semabok
4th	N20	1974 - 1978	Bernard Sta Maria	DAP
5th	N20	1978 - 1982	Bernard Sta Maria	DAP
6th	N20	1982 - 1996	Gan Boon Leong (颜文龙)	BN (MCA)
7th	N16	1986 - 1990	Gan Boon Leong (颜文龙)	BN (MCA)
8th	N16	1990 - 1995	Gan Boon Leong (颜文龙)	BN (MCA)
9th	N18	1995 – 1999	Sim Tong Him (沈同钦)	DAP
10th	N18	1999 – 2004	Sim Tong Him (沈同钦)	DAP
11th	N22	2004 – 2008	Goh Leong San (吴良山)	DAP
12th	N22	2008 – 2013	Tey Kok Kiew (郑国球)	PR (DAP)
13th	N22	2013 – 2018	Tey Kok Kiew (郑国球)	PR (DAP)
14th	N22	2018 – 2021	Tey Kok Kiew (郑国球)	PH (DAP)
15th	N22	2021 – 2026	Leng Chau Yen (林朝雁)	PH (DAP)
16th	N22	2026 – present	Leng Chau Yen (林朝雁)	PH (DAP)

== Election results ==
Malacca state election, 2026
Party	Candidate	Votes	%	∆%
PH	Leng Chau Yen	9,942	74.52	▼6.67
BN	Jasmine Lok Huey Yee	2,085	15.63	▲3.91
BERSAMA	Mohd Nor Rashidi Ab Jalil	1,315	9.86	▲9.86
Total valid votes		13,342		
Total rejected ballots		87		
Unreturned ballots		10		
Turnout		13,439	58.32	▲0,77
Registered electors		23,042		
Majority		7,857	58.89	▼10.58
PH hold		Swing		
Source(s) https://electiondata.my/elections/mlk/SE-16/

Malacca state election, 2021
Party	Candidate	Votes	%	∆%
PH	Leng Chau Yen	9,091	81.19	▲81.19
BN	Lee Kah Sean	1,313	11.72	▼4.40
PN	Clarice Chan Ming Wang	634	5.66	▲5.66
Independent	Mak Chee Kin	159	1.42	▲1.42
Total valid votes		11,197	100.00	
Total rejected ballots		226		
Unreturned ballots		34		
Turnout		11,457	57.55	▼26.35
Registered electors		19,909		
Majority		7,778	69.47	▲2.54
PH hold		Swing		
Source(s) https://lom.agc.gov.my/ilims/upload/portal/akta/outputp/1715764/PUB%20583.pdf

Malacca state election, 2018
Party	Candidate	Votes	%	∆%
PKR	Tey Kok Kiew	14,038	83.05	▲83.05
BN	Lee Chong Leng	2,725	16.12	▼8.32
Independent	Chin Choong Seong	141	0.83	▲0.83
Total valid votes		16,904	100.00	
Total rejected ballots		122		
Unreturned ballots		0		
Turnout		17,602	83.90	▲0.87
Registered electors		20,990		
Majority		11,313	66.93	▲15.81
PKR hold		Swing		

Malacca state election, 2013
Party	Candidate	Votes	%	∆%
DAP	Tey Kok Kiew	11,754	75.56	▲8.35
BN	Ronald Gan Yong Hoe	3,802	24.44	▼8.35
Total valid votes		15,556	100.00	
Total rejected ballots		200		
Unreturned ballots		0		
Turnout		15,756	83.03	▲6.21
Registered electors		18,976		
Majority		7,952	51.12	▲16.70
DAP hold		Swing		

Malacca state election, 2008
Party	Candidate	Votes	%	∆%
DAP	Tey Kok Kiew	9,591	67.21	▲15.96
BN	Chock Choon Sin	4,679	32.79	▼15.96
Total valid votes		14,270	100.00	
Total rejected ballots		151		
Unreturned ballots		0		
Turnout		14,421	76.83	▲1.42
Registered electors		18,771		
Majority		4,912	34.42	▲31.91
DAP hold		Swing		

Malacca state election, 2004
Party	Candidate	Votes	%	∆%
DAP	Goh Leong San	7,273	51.25	▼7.64
BN	Chock Choon Sin	6,917	48.75	▲7.64
Total valid votes		14,190	100.00	
Total rejected ballots		252		
Unreturned ballots		180		
Turnout		14,622	75.40	▲0.72
Registered electors		19,392		
Majority		356	2.51	▼15.28
DAP hold		Swing		

Malacca state election, 1999
Party	Candidate	Votes	%	∆%
DAP	Sim Tong Him	6,835	58.89	▲2.23
BN	Ng Peng Ann	4,771	41.11	▼2.23
Total valid votes		11,606	100.00	
Total rejected ballots		200		
Unreturned ballots		49		
Turnout		11,855	74.69	▼0.50
Registered electors		15,873		
Majority		2,064	17.78	▲4.46
DAP hold		Swing		

Malacca state election, 1995
Party	Candidate	Votes	%	∆%
DAP	Sim Tong Him	6,445	56.66	▲16.12
BN	Boon Ah Soo (Man Ah Soo)	4,929	43.34	▼9.02
Total valid votes		11,374	100.00	
Total rejected ballots		268		
Unreturned ballots		80		
Turnout		11,722	75.18	▼2.44
Registered electors		15,591		
Majority		1,516	13.33	▲1.51
DAP gain from BN		Swing		-

Malacca state election, 1990
Party	Candidate	Votes	%	∆%
BN	Gan Boon Leong	8,560	52.36	▼0.87
DAP	Tan Tong Chiew	6,628	40.54	▲1.04
PAS	Abdul Jani Abas	1,161	7.10	▲0.35
Total valid votes		16,349	100.00	
Total rejected ballots		334		
Unreturned ballots		0		
Turnout		16,683	77.62	▲1.97
Registered electors		21,492		
Majority		1,932	11.82	▼1.91
BN hold		Swing		

Malacca state election, 1986
Party	Candidate	Votes	%	∆%
BN	Gan Boon Leong	7,870	53.23	▼12.06
DAP	Ang Kwee Teng	5,840	39.50	▲5.23
PAS	Jaliluddin bin Abd. Wahid	998	6.75	▲6.75
Independent	Rosnah binti Kamarudin	77	0.52	▲0.08
Total valid votes		14,785	100.00	
Total rejected ballots		356		
Unreturned ballots		0		
Turnout		15,141	75.65	▼2.25
Registered electors		20,014		
Majority		2,030	13.73	▼17.29
BN hold		Swing		

Malacca state election, 1982
Party	Candidate	Votes	%	∆%
BN	Gan Boon Leong	6,447	65.29	▲18.97
DAP	Lim Kit Siang	3,384	34.27	▼19.41
Independent	Lee Ching Sen	44	0.45	▲0.45
Total valid votes		9,875	100.00	
Total rejected ballots		175		
Unreturned ballots		0		
Turnout		10,050	77.90	▲0.06
Registered electors		12,901		
Majority		3,063	31.02	▲23.66
BN gain from DAP		Swing		-

Malacca state election, 1978
Party	Candidate	Votes	%	∆%
DAP	Bernard Sta Maria	4,522	53.68	▲1.28
BN	Gan Boon Leong	3,902	46.32	▲3.32
Total valid votes		8,424	100.00	
Total rejected ballots		243		
Unreturned ballots		0		
Turnout		8,667	77.84	▲1.95
Registered electors		11,134		
Majority		620	7.36	▼2.04
DAP hold		Swing		

Malacca state election, 1974
Party	Candidate	Votes	%
DAP	Bernard Sta Maria	3,093	52.40
BN	Gan Boon Leong	2,538	43.00
Parti Sosialis Rakyat Malaysia	Mohd. Yusof Mohd.	138	2.34
PEKEMAS	Geh Thuan Choo	134	2.27
Total valid votes		5,903	100.00
Total rejected ballots		131	
Unreturned ballots		0	
Turnout		6,034	75.89
Registered electors		7,951	
Majority		555	9.40
This was a new constituency created.
