= Kota Laksamana =

Kota Laksamana (N20)
Malacca constituency

State constituency
- Legislature: Malacca State Legislative Assembly
MLA
Low Chee Leong
PH
- Constituency created: 2003
- First contested: 2004
- Last contested: 2026

Demographics
- Electors (2026): 34,066

N20 Kota Laksamana within Malacca, as used for the 2021 state election

Kota Laksamana is a state constituency in Malacca, Malaysia, that has been represented in the Malacca State Legislative Assembly.

The state constituency was first contested in 2004 and is mandated to return a single Assemblyman to the Malacca State Legislative Assembly under the first-past-the-post voting system. Since 2018, the State Assemblyman for Kota Laksamana is Low Chee Leong from the Democratic Action Party (DAP) which is part of the state's opposition coalition, Pakatan Harapan (PH).

== Definition ==
The Kota Laksamana constituency contains the polling districts of Kesidang Indah, Tun Perak, Kampung Enam, Pengkalan Rama Pantai, Kenanga Seksyen 1, Kenanga Seksyen 2, Kenanga Seksyen 3, Tengkera Pantai, Tengkera, Kubu, Kampung Morten, Pengkalan Rama, Kampung Hulu, Kampung Belanda, Kampung Mata Kuching and Taman Kota Laksamana.

== Demographics ==
Ethnic breakdown of Kota Laksamana's electorate as of 2026
1. Chinese (75.4%)
2. Malays (19.7%)
3. Indians (3.70%)
4. Other Ethnicities (1.10%)

== History ==
=== Polling districts ===
According to the gazette issued on 5 November 2026, the Kota Laksamana constituency has a total of 15 polling districts.

State constituency	Polling districts	Code	Location
Kota Laksamana (N20)	Kesidang Indah	138/20/01	SMK Tun Tuah
Kota Laksamana (N20)	Tun Perak	138/20/02	SMJK Tinggi Cina Melaka
Kota Laksamana (N20)	Kampung Enam	138/20/03	SMJK Notre Dame Convent
Kota Laksamana (N20)	Pengkalan Rama Pantai	138/20/04	SJK (C) Ping Ming
Kota Laksamana (N20)	Kenanga Seksyen 1	138/20/05	SRA (JAIM) Tengkera
Kota Laksamana (N20)	Kenanga Seksyen 2	138/20/06	SMJK Katholik
Kota Laksamana (N20)	Kenanga Seksyen 3	138/20/07	SJK (C) Notre Dome
Kota Laksamana (N20)	Tengkera Pantai	138/20/08	SMK (P) Methodist
Kota Laksamana (N20)	Tengkera	138/20/09	SMK Gajah Berang
Kota Laksamana (N20)	Kubu	138/20/10	Sekolah Menengah Pay Fong
Kota Laksamana (N20)	Kampung Morten	138/20/11	SRA (JAIM) Al Aliah Kubu
Kota Laksamana (N20)	Pengkalan Rama	138/20/12	SJK (C) Ping Ming
Kota Laksamana (N20)	Kampung Hulu	138/20/13	SJK (C) Pay Teck
Kota Laksamana (N20)	Kampung Belanda	138/20/14	SJK (T) Melaka (Kubu)
Kota Laksamana (N20)	Taman Kota Laksamana	138/20/15	SK Kubu

=== Representation history ===
Members of the Legislative Assembly for Kota Laksamana
Assembly	No	Years	Member	Party
Constituency created from Durian Daun, Tengkera and Bandar Hilir
11th	N20	2004–2008	Betty Chew Gek Cheng (周玉清)	DAP
12th	N20	2008–2013	Betty Chew Gek Cheng (周玉清)	PR (DAP)
13th	N20	2013–2018	Lai Keun Ban (赖君万)	PR (DAP)
14th	N20	2018–2021	Low Chee Leong (刘志俍)	PH (DAP)
15th	N20	2021–2026	Low Chee Leong (刘志俍)	PH (DAP)
16th	N20	2026 – present	Low Chee Leong (刘志俍)	PH (DAP)

== Election results ==
Malacca state election, 2026: Kota Laksamana
Party	Candidate	Votes	%	∆%
PH	Low Chee Leong	14,599	68.36	▼12.47
BN	Melvin Chua Kew Wei	5,175	24.23	▲12.18
BERSAMA	Ethan Lim Zhi Hao	1,582	7.41	▲7.41
Total valid votes		21,356	100.00	
Total rejected ballots		180		
Unreturned ballots		27		
Turnout		21,563	63.30	▲4.44
Registered electors		34,066		
Majority		9,424	44.13	▼24.65
PH hold		Swing		
Source(s) https://electiondata.my/elections/mlk/SE-16/

Malacca state election, 2021: Kota Laksamana
Party	Candidate	Votes	%	∆%
PH	Low Chee Leong	13,508	80.83	▲80.83
BN	Benjamin Low Chin Hong	2,014	12.05	▼4.17
PN	Fong Khai Ling	1,190	7.12	▲7.12
Total valid votes		16,712	100.00	
Total rejected ballots		163		
Unreturned ballots		63		
Turnout		16,938	58.86	▼24.45
Registered electors		28,777		
Majority		11,494	68.78	▲3.31
PH hold		Swing		
Source(s) https://lom.agc.gov.my/ilims/upload/portal/akta/outputp/1715764/PUB%20583.pdf

Malacca state election, 2018: Kota Laksamana
Party	Candidate	Votes	%	∆%
PKR	Low Chee Leong	20,181	81.69	▲81.69
BN	Melvin Chua Kew Wei	4,008	16.22	▼4.54
Independent	Sim Tong Him	517	2.09	▼5.36
Total valid votes		24,706	100.00	
Total rejected ballots		201		
Unreturned ballots		45		
Turnout		24,952	83.31	▼2.30
Registered electors		29,952		
Majority		16,173	65.47	▲14.44
PKR hold		Swing		

Malacca state election, 2013: Kota Laksamana
Party	Candidate	Votes	%	∆%
DAP	Lai Keun Ban	11,969	71.79	▼2.60
BN	Chiw Tiang Chai	3,462	20.76	▼4.85
Independent	Sim Tong Him	1,242	7.45	▲7.45
Total valid votes		16,673	100.00	
Total rejected ballots		220		
Unreturned ballots		0		
Turnout		16,893	85.61	▲6.08
Registered electors		19,732		
Majority		8,507	51.03	▲2.25
DAP hold		Swing		
Source(s) "Federal Government Gazette - Notice of Contested Election, State Legislative Assembly for the State of Selangor [P.U. (B) 192/2013]" (PDF). Attorney General's Chambers of Malaysia. 26 April 2013. Archived from the original (PDF) on 2019-12-29. "Federal Government Gazette - Results of Contested Election and Statements of the Poll after the Official Addition of Votes, State Constituencies for the State of Selangor [P.U. (B) 233/2013]" (PDF). Attorney General's Chambers of Malaysia. 22 May 2013. Archived from the original (PDF) on 2018-10-02.

Malacca state election, 2008: Kota Laksamana
Party	Candidate	Votes	%	∆%
DAP	Betty Chew Gek Cheng	11,043	74.39	▲11.61
BN	Lee Kiat Lee	3,801	25.61	▼11.61
Total valid votes		14,844	100.00	
Total rejected ballots		196		
Unreturned ballots		15		
Turnout		15,055	79.53	▲0.63
Registered electors		18,930		
Majority		7,242	48.78	▲23.22
DAP hold		Swing		

Malacca state election, 2004: Kota Laksamana
Party	Candidate	Votes	%
DAP	Betty Chew Gek Cheng	8,944	62.78
BN	Lim Eng Tack	5,302	37.22
Total valid votes		14,246	100.00
Total rejected ballots		215	
Unreturned ballots		0	
Turnout		14,461	78.90
Registered electors		18,957	
Majority		3,642	25.56
This was a new constituency created.
