= Duyong (state constituency) =

Political subdivision in Malaysia

Duyong (N21)
Malacca constituency

State constituency
- Legislature: Malacca State Legislative Assembly
MLA
Mohd Noor Helmy Abdul Halem
BN
- Constituency created: 1994
- First contested: 1995
- Last contested: 2026

Demographics
- Electors (2026): 26,528

N21 Duyong within Malacca, as used for the 2021 state election

Duyong is a state constituency in Malacca, Malaysia, that has been represented in the Malacca State Legislative Assembly.

== Demographics ==
Ethnic breakdown of Duyong's electorate as of 2026
1. Malay (63.8%)
2. Chinese (29.9%)
3. Indian (4.80%)
4. Other ethnicities (1.50%)

== History ==
=== Polling districts ===
According to the gazette issued on 5 November 2026, the Duyong constituency has a total of 6 polling districts.

State constituency	Polling districts	Code	Location
Duyong (N21)	Pengkalan Rama Tengah	138/21/01	SMK Tun Tijah
Duyong (N21)	Durian Daun	138/21/02	SK (P) Durian Daun
Duyong (N21)	Kg Padang Semabok	138/21/03	SK Pendidikan Khas Melaka
Duyong (N21)	Semabok	138/21/04	SK Semabok
Duyong (N21)	Perigi Hang Tuah	138/21/05	SK Duyong
Duyong (N21)	Seri Duyong	138/21/06	SK Seri Duyong; SRA (JAIM) Seri Duyong

=== Representation history ===
Members of the Legislative Assembly for Duyong
Assembly	No	Years	Member	Party
Constituency created from Ayer Molek, Durian Daun and Bandar Hilir
9th	N19	1995 – 1999	Gan Boon Leong (颜文龙)	BN (MCA)
10th	N19	1999 – 2004	Gan Boon Leong (颜文龙)	BN (MCA)
11th	N21	2004 – 2008	Gan Tian Loo (颜天禄)	BN (MCA)
12th	N21	2008 – 2013	Gan Tian Loo (颜天禄)	BN (MCA)
13th	N21	2013 – 2016	Goh Leong San (吴良山)	PR (DAP)
13th	N21	2016 – 2018	Goh Leong San (吴良山)	Independent
14th	N21	2018 – 2021	Damian Yeo Shen Li (杨胜利)	PH (DAP)
15th	N21	2021–2026	Mohd Noor Helmy Abdul Halem	BN (UMNO)
16th	N21	2026 – present	Mohd Noor Helmy Abdul Halem	BN (UMNO)

== Election results ==
Malacca state election, 2026
Party	Candidate	Votes	%	∆%
BN	Mohd Noor Helmy Abdul Halem	15,067	74.98	▲36.43
PH	Poo Long Suan	5,027	25.02	▼11.88
Total valid votes		20,094	100.00	
Total rejected ballots		103		
Unreturned ballots		17		
Turnout		20,214	76.20	▲8.01
Registered electors		26,528		
Majority		10,040	49.96	▲48.02
BN hold		Swing		
Source(s) https://electiondata.my/elections/mlk/SE-16/

Malacca state election, 2021
Party	Candidate	Votes	%	∆%
BN	Mohd Noor Helmy Abdul Halem	4,684	38.55	▲7.80
PH	Damian Yeo Shen Li	4,484	36.90	▲36.90
PN	Kamaruddin Sidek	2,874	23.65	▲23.65
Independent	Gan Tian Soh	60	0.49	▼0.11
Independent	Muhammad Hafiz Ishak	57	0.47	▲0.47
PUTRA	Mohd Faizal Hamzah	52	0.43	▲0.43
Total valid votes		12,211	100.00	
Total rejected ballots		173		
Unreturned ballots		52		
Turnout		12,436	68.19	▼17.95
Registered electors		18,237		
Majority		200	1.64	▼17.17
BN gain from PKR		Swing		?

Malacca state election, 2018
Party	Candidate	Votes	%	∆%
PKR	Damian Yeo Shen Li	7,642	49.66	▲49.66
BN	Lee Kiat Lee	4,747	30.85	▼18.50
PAS	Kamarudin Sidek	2,938	19.09	▲19.09
Independent	Lim Jak Wong	62	0.40	▲0.40
Total valid votes		15,389	100.00	
Total rejected ballots		155		
Unreturned ballots		57		
Turnout		15,601	86.15	▼1.43
Registered electors		18,110		
Majority		2,895	18.81	▲17.51
PKR hold		Swing		

Malacca state election, 2013
Party	Candidate	Votes	%	∆%
DAP	Goh Leong San	7,997	50.65	▲3.99
BN	Gan Tian Loo	7,792	49.35	▼3.99
Total valid votes		15,789	100.00	
Total rejected ballots		212		
Unreturned ballots		54		
Turnout		16,055	87.58	▲8.46
Registered electors		18,332		
Majority		205	1.30	▼5.37
DAP gain from BN		Swing		?

Malacca state election, 2008
Party	Candidate	Votes	%	∆%
BN	Gan Tian Loo	6,442	53.34	▼10.39
DAP	Damian Yeo Shen Li	5,636	46.66	▲10.39
Total valid votes		12,078	100.00	
Total rejected ballots		253		
Unreturned ballots		0		
Turnout		12,331	79.12	▲2.18
Registered electors		15,585		
Majority		806	6.68	▼22.78
BN hold		Swing		

Malacca state election, 2004
Party	Candidate	Votes	%	∆%
BN	Gan Tian Loo	7,211	64.73	▲14.51
DAP	Aw Boon Huan	3,929	35.27	▼14.51
Total valid votes		11,140	100.00	
Total rejected ballots		250		
Unreturned ballots		15		
Turnout		11,405	76.94	▼0.76
Registered electors		14,824		
Majority		3,282	29.46	▲29.02
BN hold		Swing		

Malacca state election, 1999
Party	Candidate	Votes	%	∆%
BN	Gan Boon Leong	5,074	50.22	▼3.37
DAP	Aw Boon Huan	5,029	49.78	▲13.77
Total valid votes		10,103	100.00	
Total rejected ballots		223		
Unreturned ballots		19		
Turnout		10,345	77.70	▼0.24
Registered electors		13,314		
Majority		45	0.45	▼17.14
BN hold		Swing		

Malacca state election, 1995
Party	Candidate	Votes	%
BN	Gan Boon Leong	5,119	53.60
DAP	Lee Kee Hiong	3,439	36.01
PAS	Mohd Ali Mohd. Sharif	993	10.40
Total valid votes		9,551	100.00
Total rejected ballots		162	
Unreturned ballots		25	
Turnout		9,738	77.94
Registered electors		12,494	
Majority		1,680	17.59
This was a new constituency created.
