= Melaka International College of Science and Technology =

College in Malacca, Malaysia

Melaka International College of Science and Technology (MiCoST)
- Kolej Antarabangsa Sains dan Teknologi Melaka
- Type: College
- Established: 2006
- President: Datuk Hj. Mustafa Musa
- Location: Wisma Yayasan Melaka, BLOCK C, Lot 925, Jalan Hang Tuah, 75300, Malacca, Malaysia
- Campus: Urban
- Colours: Blue & Red
- Website: micost.edu.my

Melaka International College of Science and Technology (Note: College uses the Malay language spelling of the state's name, as opposed to the more traditional English language spelling of its name, "Malacca") (Malay: Kolej Antarabangsa Sains dan Teknologi Melaka, MiCoST) is a college in Malacca, Malaysia owned by its state Government, through statutory body Yayasan Melaka's subsidiary company, YM Mediscience Sdn Bhd. MiCoST has Diploma programs in Business Management, Information Technology And Multimedia, Health Sciences and Early Childhood Education. Started from 2021, Micost also offer Sijil Kemahiran Malaysia (SKM) Operasi Sistem Komputer Level 3 for those who not qualify for Diploma after SPM and can continue till Level 4 which is on the same level as a Diploma.

== Background ==
MiCoST began its operation in 2006 with the Diploma in Pharmacy program in cooperation with MARA University of Technology (UiTM). Students are award Diploma by UiTM upon the completion of the three-year program.

In 2010, MiCoST added Diploma programs in Pharmacy, Human Resource Management, Office Management, Business Management, Accountancy.

In 2011, MiCoST became the Asia e-University's (AeU) learning centre for Southern Region of Peninsular Malaysia. That same year, MiCoST began a partnership with University of Cyberjaya (UoC).

In November 2014, MiCoST established the Faculty of Information Technology and Multimedia. This faculty offered five new programmes

- Game Design
- Graphic Design
- Interactive Media
- Digital Animation

In 2016, MiCoST added four diploma programmes in partnership with UiTM: Business Studies, Science, Pre-Diploma Science & Pre-Diploma Perdagangan.

== Courses ==
=== Sijil Kemahiran Malaysia (SKM) ===
- Level 3 Computer Operating System
- Level 4 Administration Computer System
- Level 2 Two Phase Electrical Installation & Maintenance
- Level 3 Three Phase Electrical Installation & Maintenance

=== Pre-Diploma ===
- Commerce (UiTM collaboration)
- Business Studies (UiTM collaboration)

=== Diploma ===
- Science (UiTM collaboration)
- Pharmacy (UiTM collaboration)
- Business Studies (UiTM collaboration)
- Psychology (UoC collaboration)
- Occupational Safety and Health (UoC collaboration)
- Early Childhood Education (UoC collaboration)
- Pharmacy (MiCoST)
- Business Studies (MiCoST)
- Office Management (MiCoST)
- Human Resource Management (MiCoST)
- Public Administration (MiCoST)
- Digital Animation (MiCoST)
- Game design (MiCoST)
- Graphic Design (MiCoST)
- Interactive Media (MiCoST)

=== Doctorate ===
- Business Administration (DBA)

== University Partners ==
- Universiti Teknologi MARA (UiTM)
- University of Cyberjaya (UoC)
- Asia e University (AEU)
- Mahsa University

== See also ==
- List of universities in Malaysia
