= Bernard Sta Maria =

Malaysian politician

- Born: 20 September 1944; Malacca
- Died: 30 July 1987 (aged 42); Malacca
- Occupations: Author, politician, community leader

Bernard Sta Maria (1944 – 30 July 1987) was a Malaysian politician, community leader and author. He was a member of the Legislative Assembly.

A member of the Democratic Action Party, he was first elected to the Malacca State Legislative Assembly in May 1969 making him the youngest elected State assemblyman at the age of 25. Re-elected for the second term in 1974 and the third term in 1978 for the state constituency of Bandar Hilir, Malacca. He represented the State of Malacca at the Commonwealth Parliamentary Conference at Suva, Fiji in 1981.

He was the founder of the Malacca Portuguese Cultural Society in 1967 and also the Educacao Tutorial Services in 1979.

He visited Portuguese communities in Portugal, Australia and Hawaii. He published his first book in 1976 entitle The Golden Son Of The Kadazan, a biography of Peter Mojuntin, a Kadazan community leader. His second book My People My Country was published in 1981.

In addition, he visited Portugal to witness the signing of the twin city agreement between Lisbon and the state of Malacca in 1984. Later, he delivered his last official speech at the Portuguese community conference in Macau in 1986, titled "The Scope and Dimension of Portuguese Consciousness In The Far East."

He died from serious bronchitis at age 43, in Malacca on 30 July 1987.
