= Mohd Noor Helmy =

Malaysian politician

Yang Berhormat Datuk Mohd Noor Helmy Abdul Halem DPSM BKT PJK MLA
- محمد نور حلمي عبدالحالام
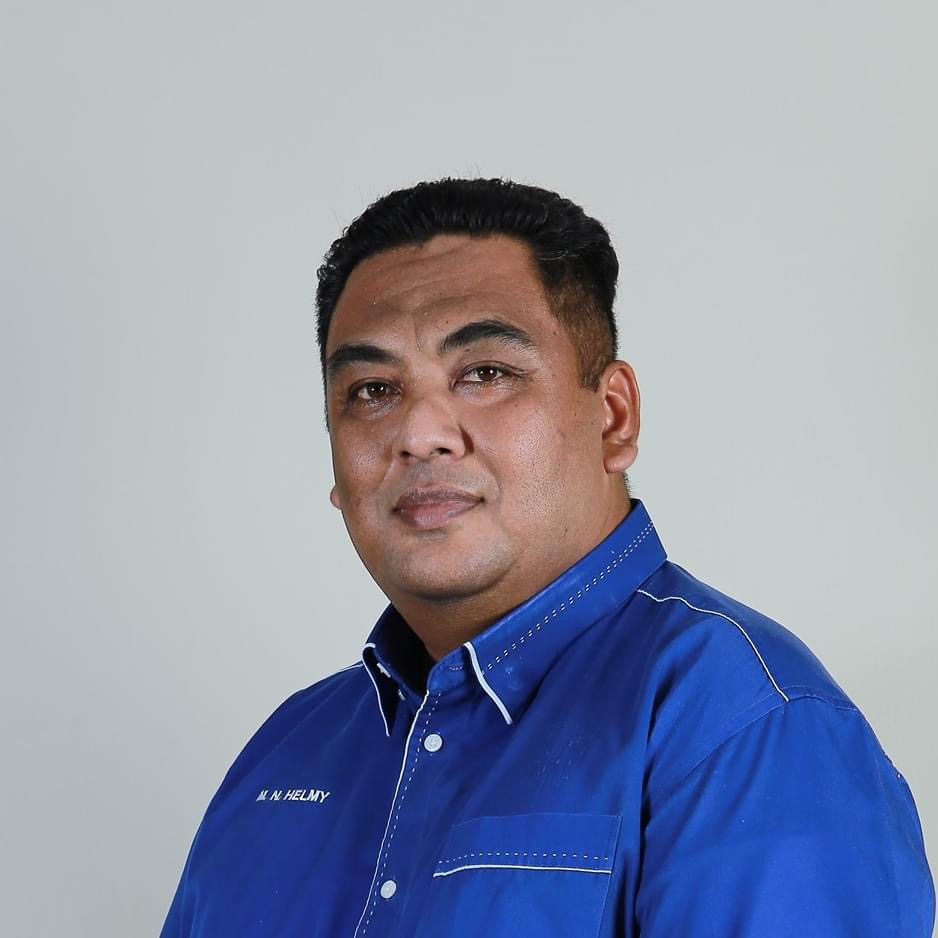
- Helmy's the-then profile picture that was taken prior to the 2021 Malacca state election

Deputy Member of the Malacca State Executive Council
- In office 6 April 2023 – 14 November 2026 (Science, Technology, Innovation, and Digital Communication)
- Governor: Mohd Ali Rustam
- Chief Minister: Ab Rauf Yusoh
- Member: Fairul Nizam Roslan
- Preceded by: Position established
- Constituency: Duyong

Member of the Malacca State Legislative Assembly for Duyong
- Incumbent
- Assumed office 20 November 2021
- Preceded by: Damian Yeo Shen Li (PH–DAP)
- Majority: 200 (2021); 10,040 (2026)

Personal details
- Born: Mohd Noor Helmy bin Abdul Halem; 8 January 1981 (age 45) Negeri Sembilan, Malaysia
- Party: United Malays National Organisation (UMNO)
- Other political affiliations: Barisan Nasional (BN)
- Education: University of Technology MARA (BEng); Asia e University (MBA)
- Occupation: Politician
- Mohd Noor Helmy on Facebook; Mohd Noor Helmy on TikTok

Mohd Noor Helmy bin Abdul Halem (Jawi: محمد نور حلمي عبدالحالام, Malay pronunciation: [muhammad noor helmy]; born 8 January 1981) is a Malaysian politician who has served as the Deputy Member of the Malacca State Executive Council (EXCO) in the Barisan Nasional (BN) state administration under Chief Minister Ab Rauf Yusoh since April 2023 and Member of the Malacca State Legislative Assembly (MLA) for Duyong since November 2021. He is a member of the United Malays National Organisation (UMNO), a component party of the Barisan Nasional (BN) coalition.

== Political career ==
=== State assembly candidacy ===
Mohd Noor Helmy's electoral presence first started by becoming the Barisan Nasional candidate for the Duyong seat in the Malacca State Legislative Assembly during the 2021 Malacca state election. Mohd Noor Helmy made an electoral upset by defeating the incumbent state assemblyman Damian Yeo Shen Li with a small majority where the seat has been held by DAP since 2013. He then became a Deputy Member of the Melaka State Executive Council in charge of Science, Technology, Innovation, and Digital Communication after the state cabinet reshuffled under Chief Minister Ab Rauf Yusoh. Prior to his state electoral appointment, Mohd Noor Helmy was formerly a City Councilor within the Malacca City Council (MBMB).

=== Career in UMNO and BN ===
Mohd Noor Helmy has held several posts within BN and UMNO where he was the former Youth Chief of UMNO Kota Melaka. He is currently a Member of the Executive Committee (EXCO/AJK) for the division.

== Views ==
=== Illegal immigration ===
Mohd Noor Helmy has gained his popularity in social media particularly in TikTok. He is known for his on-the-ground work and no-nonsense attitude where he has amassed over 1.2 million followers and 32.4 million likes in his Tiktok account as of June 2025. Mohd Noor Helmy has strict and rigid views over "PATIs" (Malay: Pendatang Asing Tanpa Izin) or illegal immigrants, particularly ethnic Rohingyas who reside in Malaysia without proper documentation.

== Election results ==
Malacca State Legislative Assembly
Year	Constituency	Candidate	Votes	Pct	Opponent(s)	Votes	Pct	Ballots cast	Majority	Turnout
2021	N21 Duyong	Mohd Noor Helmy Abdul Halem (UMNO)	4,684	38.55%	Damian Yeo Shen Li (DAP)	4,484	36.90%	12,436	200	68.19%
2021	N21 Duyong	Mohd Noor Helmy Abdul Halem (UMNO)	4,684	38.55%	Kamaruddin Sidek (PAS)	2,874	23.56%	12,436	200	68.19%
2021	N21 Duyong	Mohd Noor Helmy Abdul Halem (UMNO)	4,684	38.55%	Gan Tian Soh (IND)	60	0.49%	12,436	200	68.19%
2021	N21 Duyong	Mohd Noor Helmy Abdul Halem (UMNO)	4,684	38.55%	Muhammad Hafiz Ishak (IND)	57	0.47%	12,436	200	68.19%
2021	N21 Duyong	Mohd Noor Helmy Abdul Halem (UMNO)	4,684	38.55%	Mohd Faizal Hamzah (PUTRA)	52	0.43%	12,436	200	68.19%
2026	N21 Duyong	Mohd Noor Helmy Abdul Halem (UMNO)	15,067	74.98%	Poo Long Suan (DAP)	4,830	25.02%	19,897	10,040	76.20%

== Honours and awards ==
=== Honours of Malaysia ===
- Malacca
  - Lieutenant of the Exalted Order of Malacca (DPSM) – Datuk (2023)
  - Recipient of the Commendable Service Star (BKT) (2020)
  - Recipient of the Meritorious Service Medal (PJK) (2015)
