= Pokok Mangga =

Kampung Pokok Mangga is a village in Klebang, a suburb of Malacca City, the capital of the Malaysian state of Malacca.
