= Bemban (state constituency) =

Electoral district in Malacca, Malaysia

Bemban (N24)
Malacca constituency

State constituency
- Legislature: Malacca State Legislative Assembly
MLA
Mohd Yadzil Yaakub
PN
- Constituency created: 2004
- First contested: 2004
- Last contested: 2026

Demographics
- Electors (2026): 26,381

N24 Bemban within Malacca, as used for the 2021 state election

Bemban is a state constituency in Malacca, Malaysia, that has been represented in the Melaka State Legislative Assembly.

The state constituency was first contested in 2004 and is mandated to return a single Assemblyman to the Melaka State Legislative Assembly under the first-past-the-post voting system. Since 2021, the State Assemblyman for Bemban is Mohd Yadzil Yaakub from the WAWASAN.

== Definition ==
The Bemban constituency contains the polling districts of Pondok Kempas, Ayer Kangkong, Kesang Tua, Kesang Jaya, Ayer Barok, Taman Maju, Ayer Panas, Seri Bemban and Tehel.

== Demographics ==
Ethnic breakdown of Bemban's electorate as of 2026
1. Malay (62.1%)
2. Chinese (19.7%)
3. Indian (17.0%)
4. Other ethnicities (1.10%)

== History ==
=== Polling districts ===
According to the gazette issued on 5 November 2026, the Bemban constituency has a total of 9 polling districts.

State constituency	Polling districts	Code	Location
Bemban（N24）	Pondok Kempas	139/24/01	SJK (C) Pay Yap
Bemban（N24）	Ayer Kangkong	139/24/02	SRA (JAIM) FELDA Tun Ghaffar Ayer Kangkong
Bemban（N24）	Kesang Tua	139/24/03	SK Kesang Tua
Bemban（N24）	Kesang Jaya	139/24/04	SRA (JAIM) Kesang Tua
Bemban（N24）	Ayer Barok	139/24/05	SK Air Baruk
Bemban（N24）	Taman Maju	139/24/06	SMA Tun Perak; SMK Tan Sri Haji Abdul Aziz Tapa
Bemban（N24）	Ayer Panas	139/24/07	SMK Seri Bemban
Bemban（N24）	Seri Bemban	139/24/08	SK Seri Bemban; SJK (C) Pay Chiao
Bemban（N24）	Tehel	139/24/09	SK Tehel

=== Representation history ===
Members of the Legislative Assembly for Bemban
Assembly	No	Years	Member	Party
Constituency created from Ayer Panas and Rim
11th	N24	2004 – 2008	Chong Tam On (钟谭安)	BN (MCA)
12th	N24	2008 – 2013	Chua Kheng Hwa (蔡健华)	BN (MCA)
13th	N24	2013 – 2018	Ng Choon Koon (吴俊兑)	BN (MCA)
14th	N24	2018 – 2021	Wong Fort Pin (黃和平)	PH (DAP)
15th	N24	2021 – 2026	Mohd Yadzil Yaakub	PN (BERSATU)
15th	N24	2026	Mohd Yadzil Yaakub	Independent
15th	N24	2026	Mohd Yadzil Yaakub	PN (WAWASAN)
16th	N24	2026 – present	Mohd Yadzil Yaakub	PN (WAWASAN)

== Election results ==
Malacca state election, 2026
Party	Candidate	Votes	%	∆%
PN	Mohd Yadzil Yaakub	11,881	64.56	▲29.90
BERSAMA	Muhammad Solehin Saleh	4,140	22.50	▲22.50
BERSATU	Muhammad Rabaie Ab Hamid	2,109	11.46	▲11.46
Independent	Abd Halim Said	274	1.49	▲1.49
Total valid votes		18,404		
Total rejected ballots		182		
Unreturned ballots		24		
Turnout		18,610	70.54	▲3.76
Registered electors		26,381		
Majority		7,741	42.06	▲39.37
PN hold		Swing		
Source(s) https://electiondata.my/elections/mlk/SE-16/

Malacca state election, 2021
Party	Candidate	Votes	%	∆%
PN	Mohd Yadzil Yaakub	4,211	34.60	▲34.60
BN	Koh Chin Han	3,883	31.91	▼4.77
PH	Tey Kok Kiew	3,095	25.43	▲25.43
Independent	Ng Choon Koon	850	6.98	▲6.98
Independent	Azmi Kamis	130	1.07	▲1.07
Total valid votes		12,169	100.00	
Total rejected ballots		197		
Unreturned ballots		37		
Turnout		12,403	66.78	▼18.57
Registered electors		18,573		
Majority		328	2.69	▼6.03
PN gain from PKR		Swing		?
Source(s) https://lom.agc.gov.my/ilims/upload/portal/akta/outputp/1715764/PUB%20583.pdf

Malacca state election, 2018
Party	Candidate	Votes	%	∆%
PKR	Wong Fort Pin	6,998	45.40	▲45.40
BN	Koh Chin Han	5,653	36.68	▼20.87
PAS	Suhaimi Harun	2,762	17.92	▲17.92
Total valid votes		15,413	100.00	
Total rejected ballots		227		
Unreturned ballots		59		
Turnout		15,699	85.35	▼1.89
Registered electors		18,393		
Majority		1,345	8.72	▼5.38
PKR gain from BN		Swing		?

Malacca state election, 2013
Party	Candidate	Votes	%	∆%
BN	Ng Choon Koon	7,731	57.55	▼3.24
DAP	Gandhi Rajan Nalliah	5,703	43.45	▲3.24
Total valid votes		13,434	100.00	
Total rejected ballots		360		
Unreturned ballots		0		
Turnout		13,794	87.24	▲9.37
Registered electors		15,811		
Majority		2,028	14.10	▼7.48
BN hold		Swing		
Source(s) "Federal Government Gazette - Notice of Contested Election, State Legislative Assembly for the State of Selangor [P.U. (B) 192/2013]" (PDF). Attorney General's Chambers of Malaysia. 26 April 2013. Archived from the original (PDF) on 29 December 2019. "Federal Government Gazette - Results of Contested Election and Statements of the Poll after the Official Addition of Votes, State Constituencies for the State of Selangor [P.U. (B) 233/2013]" (PDF). Attorney General's Chambers of Malaysia. 22 May 2013. Archived from the original (PDF) on 2 October 2018.

Malacca state election, 2008
Party	Candidate	Votes	%	∆%
BN	Chua Kheng Hwa	6,031	60.79	▼6.20
DAP	Steven Ho Hia Kim	3,890	39.21	▲25.58
Total valid votes		9,921	100.00	
Total rejected ballots		590		
Unreturned ballots		36		
Turnout		10,547	77.87	▲0.21
Registered electors		13,544		
Majority		2,141	21.58	▼26.03
BN hold		Swing		

Malacca state election, 2004
Party	Candidate	Votes	%
BN	Chong Tam On	6,245	66.99
PKR	Abdul Wahab Ibrahim	1,807	19.38
DAP	Yap Kok Guan	1,270	13.63
Total valid votes		9,322	100.00
Total rejected ballots		429	
Unreturned ballots		0	
Turnout		9,751	77.66
Registered electors		12,556	
Majority		4,438	47.61
This was a new constituency created.
