= Pay Fong High School =

High school

Pay Fong Middle School
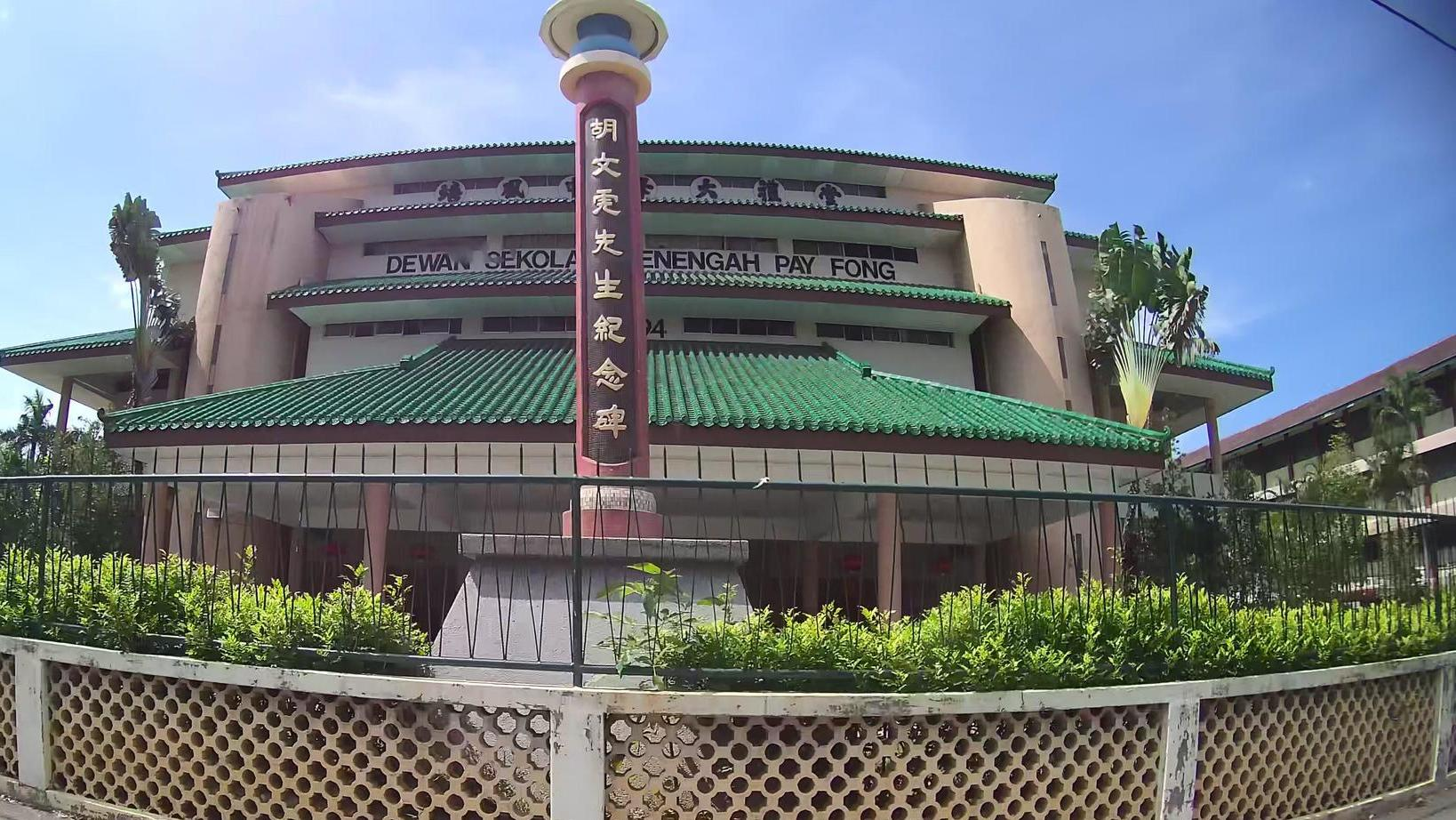

Location
- 40, Jalan Tan Chay Yan; Malacca, 75300; Malaysia
- Coordinates: 2.201417°N 102.243987°E

Information
- Type: Chinese independent high school
- Motto: 公 忠 勤 毅 Public-spirited, loyal, diligent, and persevering
- Established: 7 July 1913
- School district: Melaka Tengah
- Language: Chinese, Malay, English
- Website: http://www.payfong.edu.my/

Pay Fong Middle School
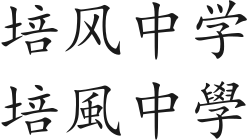
- Pay Fong Middle School in Simplified Chinese (top) and Traditional Chinese (below) character
- Traditional Chinese: 培風中學
- Simplified Chinese: 培风中学
Transcriptions
Standard Mandarin
- Hanyu Pinyin: Péifēng Zhōngxué

Pay Fong High School (培风中学), also referred to as Pay Fong Middle School, is a Malaysian Chinese Independent High School located in Malacca, Malaysia. It was established on 7 July 1913 and is currently the only Chinese school in the state. The school is located along Jalan Tan Chay Yan and Jalan Kampong Empat, near Jalan Kubu.

== Events ==
In the 1950s and 1960s, the school was a centre of activity for "leftist" students and teachers. In November 1957, more than a hundred students staged a protest against the government's educational policy. After meeting in the basketball ground, the students locked the gates and kept the keys. Riot squads arrived at the school within minutes and encircled it to break up the protest. The students eventually dispersed though some booed at the police. A few years later in 1959, two students were arrested and jailed for possessing "subversive documents". The school's website was allegedly hacked by an unknown student in 2017 and student details are leaked online.
