= Kesidang =

State constituency of Malaysia

Kesidang (N19)
Malacca constituency

State constituency
- Legislature: Malacca State Legislative Assembly
MLA
Allex Seah Shoo Chin
PH
- Constituency created: 2003
- First contested: 2004
- Last contested: 2026

Demographics
- Electors (2026): 54,910

N19 Kesidang within Malacca, as used for the 2021 state election

Kesidang is a state constituency in Malacca, Malaysia, that has been represented in the Melaka State Legislative Assembly.

The state constituency was first contested in 2004 and is mandated to return a single Assemblyman to the Melaka State Legislative Assembly under the first-past-the-post voting system. Since 2018, the State Assemblyman for Kesidang is Allex Seah Shoo Chin from the Democratic Action Party (DAP) which is a component parfy of the Pakatan Harapan (PH) coalition.

== Definition ==
The Kesidang constituency contains the polling districts of Taman Merdeka, Batu Berendam, Taman Melaka Baru, Malim Jaya, Bertam, Taman Asean, Kampung Padang, Bakar Batu and Limbongan.

== Demographics ==
Ethnic breakdown of Kesidang's electorate as of 2026
1. Chinese (54.7%)
2. Malays (38.5%)
3. Indians (5.00%)
4. Other Ethnicities (1.80%)

== History ==
=== Polling districts ===
According to the gazette issued on 5 November 2026, the Kesidang constituency has a total of 9 polling districts.

State constituency	Polling districts	Code	Location
Kesidang (N19)	Taman Merdeka	138/19/01	SK Taman Merdeka; SRA (JAIM) Taman Datuk Thamby Chik Karim
Kesidang (N19)	Batu Berendam	138/19/02	SK Batu Berendam
Kesidang (N19)	Taman Melaka Baru	138/19/03	SK Batu Berendam 2
Kesidang (N19)	Malim Jaya	138/19/04	SMK Malim
Kesidang (N19)	Bertam	138/19/05	SK Malim; SJK (C) Ting Hwa
Kesidang (N19)	Taman Asean	138/19/06	SJK (C) Malim
Kesidang (N19)	Kampung Padang	138/19/07	SRA (JAIM) Kampung Padang
Kesidang (N19)	Bakar Batu	138/19/08	SK Bachang
Kesidang (N19)	Limbongan	138/19/09	SK Tengkera 1

=== Representation history ===
Members of the Legislative Assembly for Kesidang
Assembly	No	Years	Member	Party
Constituency created from Tengkera, Paya Rumput and Durian Daun
11th	N19	2004 – 2008	Koh Nai Kwong (古乃光)	BN (MCA)
12th	N19	2008 – 2013	Goh Leong San (吴良山)	PR (DAP)
13th	N19	2013 – 2018	Chin Choong Seong (陈仲祥)	PR (DAP)
14th	N19	2018 – 2021	Allex Seah Shoo Chin (谢守钦)	PH (DAP)
15th	N19	2021–2026	Allex Seah Shoo Chin (谢守钦)	PH (DAP)
16th	N19	2026 – present	Allex Seah Shoo Chin (谢守钦)	PH (DAP)

== Election results ==
Malacca state election, 2026: Kesidang
Party	Candidate	Votes	%	∆%
PH	Allex Seah Shoo Chin	21,986	60.03	▼5.83
PN	Albert Kok Boon Chang	12,634	34.50	▲20.57
BERSAMA	Bryan Kek Kit Hun	2,003	5.47	▲5.47
Total valid votes		36,623		
Total rejected ballots		228		
Unreturned ballots		51		
Turnout		36,902	67.20	▲6.12
Registered electors		54,910		
Majority		9,352	25.53	▼20.12
PH hold		Swing		
Source(s) https://electiondata.my/elections/mlk/SE-16/

Malacca state election, 2021: Kesidang
Party	Candidate	Votes	%	∆%
PH	Allex Seah Shoo Chin	14,769	65.86	▲65.86
BN	Leong Hui Ying	4,532	20.21	▼6.04
PN	Patrick Ng Chin Kae	3,124	13.93	▲13.93
Total valid votes		22,425		
Total rejected ballots		269		
Unreturned ballots		93		
Turnout		22,787	61.08	▼24.50
Registered electors		37,304		
Majority		10,237	45.65	▼0.74
PH hold		Swing		
Source(s) https://lom.agc.gov.my/ilims/upload/portal/akta/outputp/1715764/PUB%20583.pdf

Malacca state election, 2018: Kesidang
Party	Candidate	Votes	%	∆%
PKR	Allex Seah Shoo Chin	22,880	72.64	▲72.64
BN	Ng Choon Koon	8,268	26.25	▼11.08
Independent	Goh Leong San	349	1.11	▲1.11
Total valid votes		31,497	100.00	
Total rejected ballots		380		
Unreturned ballots		93		
Turnout		31,970	85.58	▼0.93
Registered electors		37,355		
Majority		14,612	46.39	▲21.05
PKR hold		Swing		

Malacca state election, 2013: Kesidang
Party	Candidate	Votes	%	∆%
DAP	Chin Choong Seong	9,443	62.67	▲7.32
BN	Lim Eng Teck	5,625	37.33	▼7.32
Total valid votes		15,068	100.00	
Total rejected ballots		156		
Unreturned ballots		0		
Turnout		15,224	86.51	▲5.62
Registered electors		17,597		
Majority		3,818	25.34	▲14.64
DAP hold		Swing		
Source(s) "Federal Government Gazette - Notice of Contested Election, State Legislative Assembly for the State of Selangor [P.U. (B) 192/2013]" (PDF). Attorney General's Chambers of Malaysia. 26 April 2013. Archived from the original (PDF) on 2019-12-29. "Federal Government Gazette - Results of Contested Election and Statements of the Poll after the Official Addition of Votes, State Constituencies for the State of Selangor [P.U. (B) 233/2013]" (PDF). Attorney General's Chambers of Malaysia. 22 May 2013. Archived from the original (PDF) on 2018-10-02.

Malacca state election, 2008: Kesidang
Party	Candidate	Votes	%	∆%
DAP	Goh Leong San	7,241	55.35	▲12.44
BN	Koh Nai Kwong	5,842	44.65	▼12.44
Total valid votes		13,083	100.00	
Total rejected ballots		221		
Unreturned ballots		21		
Turnout		13,325	80.89	▲1.99
Registered electors		16,472		
Majority		1,399	10.70	▼3.48
DAP gain from BN		Swing		?

Malacca state election, 2004: Kesidang
Party	Candidate	Votes	%
BN	Koh Nai Kwong	6,846	57.09
DAP	Lim Jak Wong	5,145	42.91
Total valid votes		11,991	100.00
Total rejected ballots		240	
Unreturned ballots		0	
Turnout		12,231	78.90
Registered electors		15,502	
Majority		1,701	14.18
This was a new constituency created.
