= Low Chee Leong =

Malaysian politician

Yang Berhormat Tuan Low Chee Leong MLA
- 刘志俍

Deputy Member of the Malacca State Executive Council (Rural Development, Agriculture and Food Security)
- In office 6 April 2023 – 14 July 2026
- Governor: Mohd Ali Rustam
- Chief Minister: Ab Rauf Yusoh
- Member: Muhamad Akmal Saleh
- Preceded by: Position established
- Succeeded by: TBD
- Constituency: Kota Laksamana

Member of the Malacca State Executive Council (Health and Anti-drugs)
- In office 16 May 2018 – 2 March 2020
- Governor: Mohd Khalil Yaakob
- Chief Minister: Adly Zahari
- Preceded by: Ab Rahman Ab Karim
- Succeeded by: Rahmad Mariman
- Constituency: Kota Laksamana

Member of the Malacca State Legislative Assembly for Kota Laksamana
- Incumbent
- Assumed office 9 May 2018
- Preceded by: Lai Keun Ban (PR–DAP)
- Majority: 16,173 (2018); 11,494 (2021); 9,424 (2026)

Faction represented in Malacca State Legislative Assembly
- 2018–: Pakatan Harapan

Personal details
- Born: Low Chee Leong; 1970 (age 55–56) Malacca, Malaysia
- Citizenship: Malaysian
- Party: Democratic Action Party (DAP)
- Other political affiliations: Pakatan Harapan (PH)
- Occupation: Politician
- Website: www.n20melaka.info
- Low Chee Leong on Facebook

Low Chee Leong

Chinese name
- Traditional Chinese: 劉誌俍
- Simplified Chinese: 刘志俍
- Hanyu Pinyin: Liú Zhìliáng
- Jyutping: Lau4 Zi3 Loeng4
- Hokkien POJ: Lâu Chì-liông
- Tâi-lô: Lâu Tsì-liông

Low Chee Leong (born 1970) is a Malaysian politician who has served as Member of the Malacca State Legislative Assembly (MLA) for Kota Laksamana since May 2018.

He served as Member of the Malacca State Executive Council (EXCO) in the Pakatan Harapan (PH) state administration under former Chief Minister Adly Zahari from May 2018 to the collapse of the PH state administration in March 2020 and Deputy Member of the Malacca State EXCO in the Barisan Nasional (BN) state administration under Chief Minister Ab Rauf Yusoh and Member Muhamad Akmal Saleh from April 2023 to his resignation in July 2026. He was one of the only two Malacca Deputy EXCO Members of PH and DAP along with Leng Chau Yen. His appointment as a Deputy EXCO Member in April 2023 is a demotion as he was previously appointed an EXCO member in May 2018.

This has rarely happened in the Malaysian politics. He is a member of the Democratic Action Party (DAP), a component party of the PH coalition.

== Election results ==
Malacca State Legislative Assembly
Year	Constituency	Candidate	Votes	Pct	Opponent(s)	Votes	Pct	Ballots cast	Majority	Turnout%
2018	N20 Kota Laksamana	Low Chee Leong (DAP)	20,181	81.69%	Melvin Chua Kew Wei (MCA)	4,008	16.22%	24,952	16,173	83.30%
2018	N20 Kota Laksamana	Low Chee Leong (DAP)	20,181	81.69%	Sim Tong Him (IND)	517	2.09%	24,952	16,173	83.30%
2021	N20 Kota Laksamana	Low Chee Leong (DAP)	13,508	80.83%	Benjamin Low Chin Hong (MCA)	2,014	12.05%	16,712	11,494	58.07%
2021	N20 Kota Laksamana	Low Chee Leong (DAP)	13,508	80.83%	Karen Fong Khai Ling (GERAKAN)	1,190	7.12%	16,712	11,494	58.07%
2026	N20 Kota Laksamana	Low Chee Leong (DAP)	14,599	68.36%	Melvin Chua Kew Wei (MCA)	5,175	24.23%	21,356	9,424	63.30%
2026	N20 Kota Laksamana	Low Chee Leong (DAP)	14,599	68.36%	Ethan Lim Zhi Hao (BERSAMA)	1,582	7.41%	21,356	9,424	63.30%
