= Gan Boon Leong =

Former Malaysian politician

Yang Berbahagia Datuk Wira Gan Boon Leong DCSM DMSM JSM AMN
- 颜文龙

Member of the Malacca State Legislative Assembly for Duyong
- In office 1995–1999

Member of the Malacca State Legislative Assembly for Bandar Hilir
- In office 1982–1995

Personal details
- Born: 25 August 1937
- Died: 15 August 2022 (aged 84)

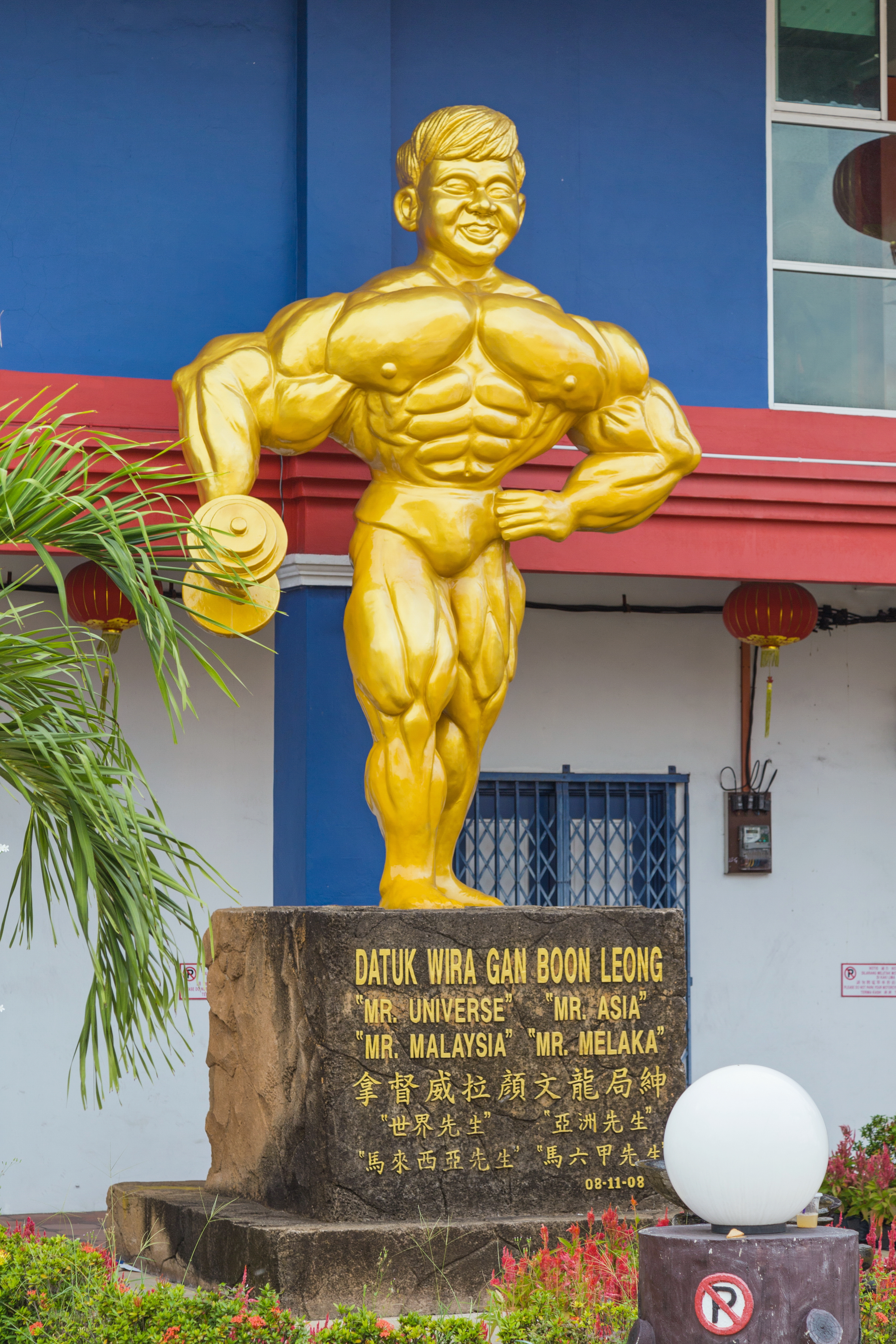
Statue of Gan Boon Leong.

Gan Boon Leong (25 August 1937 – 15 August 2022) was a Malaysian politician. He was a member of Malaysian Chinese Association, a component party of Barisan Nasional.

== Early life ==
Gan was born on 25 August 1937.

== Political career ==
Gan started his political career by winning the Bandar Hilir state constituency seat and defeated Lim Kit Siang with a large majority in 1986. He subsequently won the seat in 1990. In 1995 and 1999, Gan won to Duyong state constituency seat. He was retired from politics in 2004.

== Death ==
Gan died on 15 August 2022 due to old age.

== Election results ==
Malacca State Legislative Assembly
Year	Constituency	Candidate	Votes	Pct	Opponent(s)	Votes	Pct	Ballots cast	Majority	Turnout
1982	N20 Bandar Hilir	Gan Boon Leong (MCA)	6,447	65.29%	Lim Kit Siang (DAP)	3,384	34.27%	10,050	3,063	77.9%
1982	N20 Bandar Hilir	Gan Boon Leong (MCA)	6,447	65.29%	Lee Ching Sen (IND)	44	0.45%	10,050	3,063	77.9%
1986	N16 Bandar Hilir	Gan Boon Leong (MCA)	7,870	53.23%	Ang Kwee Teng (DAP)	5,840	39.50%	15,141	2,030	75.65%
1986	N16 Bandar Hilir	Gan Boon Leong (MCA)	7,870	53.23%	Jaliluddin Abdul Wahid (PAS)	998	6.75%	15,141	2,030	75.65%
1986	N16 Bandar Hilir	Gan Boon Leong (MCA)	7,870	53.23%	Rosnah Baharuddin (IND)	77	0.52%	15,141	2,030	75.65%
1990	N16 Bandar Hilir	Gan Boon Leong (MCA)	8,560	52.36%	Tan Tong Chiew (DAP)	6,628	40.54%	10,763	4,867	79.11%
1990	N16 Bandar Hilir	Gan Boon Leong (MCA)	8,560	52.36%	Abdul Jani Abas (PAS)	1,161	7.10%	10,763	4,867	79.11%
1995	N19 Duyong	Gan Boon Leong (MCA)	5,119	53.60%	Lee Kee Hiong (DAP)	3,439	36.01%	9,738	1,680	77.94%
1995	N19 Duyong	Gan Boon Leong (MCA)	5,119	53.60%	Mohd Ali Mohd Sharif (PAS)	993	10.40%	9,738	1,680	77.94%
1999	N19 Duyong	Gan Boon Leong (MCA)	5,074	50.22%	Aw Boon Huan (DAP)	5,029	49.78%	10,326	45	77.56%

== Honours ==
- Malaysia
  - Member of the Order of the Defender of the Realm (AMN) (1977)
  - Companion of the Order of Loyalty to the Crown of Malaysia (JSM) (1997)
- Malacca
  - Companion Class I of the Exalted Order of Malacca (DMSM) – Datuk (1982)
  - Knight Commander of the Exalted Order of Malacca (DCSM) – Datuk Wira (1995)
