= Damian Yeo Shen Li =

Malaysian politician

Member of the Malacca State Legislative Assembly for Duyong
- In office 9 May 2018 – 20 November 2021
- Preceded by: Goh Leong San (IND)
- Succeeded by: Mohd Noor Helmy Abdul Halem (BN–UMNO)
- Majority: 2,895 (2018)

Personal details
- Born: 31 March 1975 (age 51) Malacca, Malaysia
- Party: Democratic Action Party (DAP)
- Other political affiliations: Pakatan Rakyat (PR); Pakatan Harapan (PH)
- Education: University of London (LLB)
- Occupation: Politician
- Profession: Lawyer

Damian Yeo Shen Li is a Malaysian politician and lawyer who served as member of the Malacca State Legislative Assembly (MLA) for Duyong from May 2018 to November 2021 as well as state chairman of the Democratic Action Party of Malacca from 2022 to 2023. He is a member of Democratic Action Party (DAP), a component party of Pakatan Harapan (PH) and formerly Pakatan Rakyat (PR) coalitions.

== Background ==
Damian Yeo Shen Li was born into a Peranakan family in Malacca, Malaysia on 31 March 1975. He holds a Bachelor of Laws (Hons) from University of London in 1996. He also have a law firm named Damian S. L. Yeo & L. C. Goh, he served as managing partner and head of corporate and advisory of the law firm.

== Political career ==
=== Candidate of 2008 general election ===
In the 2008 Malacca state election, Damian Yeo Shen Li made his first electoral debut after being nominated by DAP to contest for the Duyong state seat. He was defeated by Gan Tian Loo of BN by majority of 806 votes.

=== Candidate of 2013 general election ===
In the 2013 Malaysian general election, Damian Yeo Shen Li was nominated by DAP to contest for the Alor Gajah federal seat. He was defeated by Koh Nai Kwong of BN by majority of 11,597.

=== Member of the Malacca State Legislative Assembly (2018–2021) ===
In the 2018 Malacca state election, Damian Yeo Shen Li was nominated by DAP again to contest for the Duyong seat and won the seat and was elected to the Malacca State Legislative Assembly as the Duyong MLA for the first term after defeating Lee Kiat Lee of BN, Kamarudin Sidek of PAS and independent candidate Lim Jak Wong by a majority of 2,895 votes.

In the 2021 Malacca state election, Damian Yeo Shen Li was defeated by Mohd Noor Helmy Abdul Halem of BN by a slim majority of 200 votes.

=== Resignation as State Chairman of the DAP of Malacca ===
Damian Yeo Shen Li announced his resignation as State Chairman of the DAP of Malacca, citing work commitments.

== Election results ==
Malacca State Legislative Assembly
Year	Constituency	Candidate	Votes	Pct	Opponent(s)	Votes	Pct	Ballots cast	Majority	Turnout
2008	N21 Duyong	Damian Yeo Shen Li (DAP)	5,636	46.66%	Gan Tian Loo (MCA)	6,442	53.34%	12,331	806	79.12%
2018	N21 Duyong	Damian Yeo Shen Li (DAP)	7,642	49.66%	Lee Kiat Lee (MCA)	4,747	30.85%	15,601	2,895	86.15%
2018	N21 Duyong	Damian Yeo Shen Li (DAP)	7,642	49.66%	Kamarudin Sidek (PAS)	2,938	19.09%	15,601	2,895	86.15%
2018	N21 Duyong	Damian Yeo Shen Li (DAP)	7,642	49.66%	Lim Jak Wong (IND)	62	0.40%	15,601	2,895	86.15%
2021	N21 Duyong	Damian Yeo Shen Li (DAP)	4,484	36.90%	Mohd Noor Helmy Abdul Halem (UMNO)	4,684	38.55%	12,436	200	68.19%
2021	N21 Duyong	Damian Yeo Shen Li (DAP)	4,484	36.90%	Kamaruddin Sidek (PAS)	2,874	23.65%	12,436	200	68.19%
2021	N21 Duyong	Damian Yeo Shen Li (DAP)	4,484	36.90%	Gan Tian Soh (IND)	60	0.49	12,436	200	68.19%
2021	N21 Duyong	Damian Yeo Shen Li (DAP)	4,484	36.90%	Muhammad Hafiz Ishak (IND)	57	0.47%	12,436	200	68.19%
2021	N21 Duyong	Damian Yeo Shen Li (DAP)	4,484	36.90%	Mohd Faizal Hamzah (PUTRA)	52	0.43%	12,436	200	68.19%

Parliament of Malaysia
Year	Constituency	Candidate	Votes	Pct	Opponent(s)	Votes	Pct	Ballots cast	Majority	Turnout
2013	P135 Alor Gajah	Damian Yeo Shen Li (DAP)	20,997	39.18%	Koh Nai Kwong (MCA)	32,594	60.82%	55,131	11,597	86.70%
