= Betty Chew =

Malaysian politician

Betty Chew Gek Cheng
- 周玉清

Member of the Malacca State Legislative Assembly for Kota Laksamana
- In office 21 March 2004 – 5 May 2013
- Preceded by: Position established
- Succeeded by: Lai Keun Ban
- Majority: 7,242

Member of the Malacca State Legislative Assembly for Durian Daun
- In office 29 November 1999 – 21 March 2004
- Preceded by: Yew Kok Kee
- Succeeded by: Position abolished
- Majority: 3,369

Personal details
- Born: 15 August 1964 (age 61) Tengkera, Malacca, Malaysia
- Party: Democratic Action Party (DAP)
- Other political affiliations: Pakatan Harapan (PH) (since 2015); Pakatan Rakyat (PR) (2008-2015); Barisan Alternatif (BA) (1998-2004)
- Spouse: Lim Guan Eng
- Children: 4
- Occupation: Politician

Betty Chew Gek Cheng (Chinese: 周玉清; pinyin: Zhōu Yùqīng; Pe̍h-ōe-jī: Chiu Ge̍k-chheng; born 15 August 1964) is a Malaysian politician from the Democratic Action Party (DAP), a component party of the Pakatan Harapan (PH) opposition coalition who served as Member of the Malacca State Legislative Assembly (MLA) for Kota Laksamana from March 2004 to May 2013 and Durian Daun from November 1999 to March 2004. She also served as Malacca State Women Chief of DAP of as of 2005. She is also the spouse and wife of Lim Guan Eng, the present National Chairman and former Secretary-General of DAP, former Minister of Finance and former Chief Minister of Penang as well as the daughter-in-law of another former Secretary-General and former National Chairman of DAP, Lim Kit Siang.

In 2005, she suffered a surprise defeat when running for re-election to the DAP Malacca committee, placing second-last, finishing ahead of only her husband. However, while her husband automatically qualified to sit on the committee by virtue of his position as party Secretary-General, Chew did not. Chew was "saddened by the results", but said she accepted her defeat. However, Teresa Kok, a DAP Member of Parliament, suggested there was a conspiracy behind the defeat of Lim and Chew in their re-election campaigns.

In 2006, it was reported that Chew would become the first Malacca assemblyman to give birth while in office. At the time, Chew had 4 children with Lim.

In 2008, Chew defeated newcomer Lee Kiat Lee for the Kota Laksamana seat where she had 11043 votes while Lee had only 3801 votes.

== Election results ==
Malacca State Legislative Assembly
Year	Constituency	Candidate	Votes	Pct	Opponent(s)	Votes	Pct	Ballots cast	Majority	Turnout
1999	N17 Durian Daun	Betty Chew Gek Cheng (DAP)	7,380	64.77%	Chew Chong Lin (MCA)	4,011	35.2%	11,605	3,369	73.88%
2004	N20 Kota Laksamana	Betty Chew Gek Cheng (DAP)	8,944	62.74%	Lim Eng Tack (MCA)	5,302	37.19%	14,471	3,642	76.34%
2008	N20 Kota Laksamana	Betty Chew Gek Cheng (DAP)	11,043	73.35%	Lee Kiat Lee (MCA)	3,801	25.25%	15,055	7,242	79.53%
