= Malacca State Route M143 =

Road in Malaysia

Melaka Route 143
- Jalan Kuala Sungai Baru–Sungai Udang

Major junctions
- Northwest end: Kuala Sungai Baru
- FT 138 Federal Route 138; M157 State Route M157; FT 5 Federal Route 5
- Southeast end: Sungai Udang

Location
- Country: Malaysia
- Primary destinations: Pengkalan Balak, Tanjung Bidara

Highway system
- Highways in Malaysia; Expressways; Federal; State

Jalan Kuala Sungai Baru–Sungai Udang, Malacca State Route M143 is a major road in Malacca, Malaysia.

== History ==
The Kuala Linggi–Kuala Sungai Baru (M143) sections and Kuala Sungai Baru–Sungai Raya (N143) sections are gazetted as Federal Route 138.

== Junction lists ==
The entire route is located in Malacca.

Legend:

- I/C - Interchange, I/S - Intersection, RSA - Rest and service area, OBR - Overhead bridge restaurant, R/R - Restaurant and rest plaza, L/B - Layby, V/P - Vista point, TN - tunnel, T/P - Toll plaza, BR - Bridge
- C - Cloverleaf, S - Stack, T-A - Trumpet-A, T-B - Trumpet-B, DT - Directional-T/Y, SDT - Semi-Directional-T/Y, P-Y - Partial-Y, D - Diamond, P-C - Partial cloverleaf, D-D - Diverging diamond, D-R - Direct ramp

District	Location	km	mi	Name	Destinations	Notes
Alor Gajah	Kuala Sungai Baru			Kuala Linggi–Kuala Sungai Baru see also FT 138 Malaysia Federal Route 138		
Alor Gajah	Kuala Sungai Baru			Kuala Sungai Baru	FT 138 Malaysia Federal Route 138 – Kuala Sungai Baru town centre, Port Dickson, Akademi Laut Malaysia (ALAM), Lubuk China, Masjid Tanah, Malacca City	T-junctions
Alor Gajah	Kuala Sungai Baru			Kampung Baru Paya Mengkuang		
Alor Gajah	Kuala Sungai Baru			Kampung Sungai Tuang		
Alor Gajah	Kuala Sungai Baru			Kampung Sungai Kertah		
Alor Gajah	Pengkalan Balak			Pengkalan Balak	M157 Malacca State Route M157 – Londang, Masjid Tanah, Malacca Matriculation College (KMM), Pengkalan Balak beach V	Roundabout
Alor Gajah	Tanjung Bidara			Kampung Tanjung Bidara	Tanjung Bidara beach V	
Melaka Tengah	Sungai Udang			Sungai Udang	FT 5 Malaysia Federal Route 5 – Port Dickson, Masjid Tanah, Tanjung Kling, Malacca City	T-junctions
1.000 mi = 1.609 km; 1.000 km = 0.621 mi: Concurrency terminus
