= Malaysia Federal Route 138 =

Road in Malaysia

Federal Route 138

Route information
- Maintained by Malaysian Public Works Department
- Length: 16.30 km (10.13 mi)

Major junctions
- Northwest end: Kuala Linggi
- M161 Jalan Ramuan China-Kuala Sungai Baru; M143 Jalan Kuala Sungai Baru-Sungai Udang; FT 5 Federal Route 5 M142 Lubuk Redan–Masjid Tanah
- Northeast end: Masjid Tanah; Kampung Jeram

Location
- Country: Malaysia
- Primary destinations: Kuala Sungai Baru, Tanjung Bidara

Highway system
- Highways in Malaysia; Expressways; Federal; State

Federal Route 138 is a federal road in Malacca, Malaysia, connecting Masjid Tanah and Kuala Linggi. It was originally known as Jalan Kuala Sungai Baru-Sungai Udang (Malacca State Route M143 on Kuala Linggi–Kuala Sungai Baru side) and Jalan Lubuk Redan–Masjid Tanah (Malacca State Route M142). Federal Route 138 features Sungai Linggi Bridge and was built to provide a shorter, less-winding alternative to Federal Route 5 for journeys from Malacca City to Port Dickson. Kilometre Zero of Federal Route 138 is at Kampung Jeram near Masjid Tanah.

== Features ==
=== Notable features ===
- Shortcut routes to Port Dickson from Malacca City.
- Kolej Universiti Islam Melaka (KUIM)
- Akademi Laut Malaysia (ALAM) (Malaysian Maritime Academy)
- Sungai Linggi Bridge - A box girder bridge near Dutch Kuala Linggi Fort officially opened on 10 July 1990 by fourth Malaysian Prime Minister, Mahathir Mohamad.

At most sections, the Federal Route 138 was built under the JKR R5 road standard, allowing maximum speed limit of up to 90 km/h.

=== Overlaps ===
- Kuala Linggi - Kuala Sungai Baru: M143 Jalan Kuala Sungai Baru-Sungai Udang

=== Alternate routes ===
None

=== Sections with motorcycle lanes ===
None

== Junction lists ==
Legend:

- I/C - Interchange, I/S - Intersection, RSA - Rest and service area, OBR - Overhead bridge restaurant, R/R - Restaurant and rest plaza, L/B - Layby, V/P - Vista point, TN - tunnel, T/P - Toll plaza, BR - Bridge
- C - Cloverleaf, S - Stack, T-A - Trumpet-A, T-B - Trumpet-B, DT - Directional-T/Y, SDT - Semi-Directional-T/Y, P-Y - Partial-Y, D - Diamond, P-C - Partial cloverleaf, D-D - Diverging diamond, D-R - Direct ramp

State	District	Km	Exit	Name	Destinations	Notes
Negeri Sembilan	Port Dickson			Kampung Sungai Raya	FT 5 Malaysia Federal Route 5 – Port Dickson, Pasir Panjang, Linggi, Rembau, Seremban; North–South Expressway Southern Route / AH2 – Kuala Lumpur, Johor Bahru	
Negeri Sembilan	Port Dickson			Batu Ibol		
Negeri Sembilan	Port Dickson			UNITI	Persiaran UNITI – UNITI	
Negeri Sembilan	Port Dickson			Kampung Tanjung Agas		
Negeri Sembilan–Malacca border			BR	Sungai Linggi Bridge		
Malacca	Alor Gajah		R/R	Kuala Linggi; Kuala Linggi Malacca Recreational Area	Kuala Linggi Malacca Recreational Area – V	
Malacca	Alor Gajah			Malaysian Maritime Enforcement Agency (MMEA) Kuala Linggi Maritime District		
Malacca	Alor Gajah			Rural Transformation Centre (RTC)		
Malacca	Alor Gajah			Kampung Seberang Parit		
Malacca	Alor Gajah			Jalan Kuala Linggi	Jalan Kuala Linggi – Kuala Linggi, Bagan Che Amar, Kampung Nelayan, Dutch Fort (Hollandfoort) V	T-junctions
Malacca	Alor Gajah			Kampung Tanjung Serai		
Malacca	Alor Gajah			Desa Balqis Beach Resort	Desa Balqis Beach Resort @ Kuala Linggi	
Malacca	Alor Gajah			Kampung Tanjung Dahan		
Malacca	Alor Gajah			Malaysian Maritime Academy (ALAM)	Malaysian Maritime Academy (ALAM)	T-junctions
Malacca	Alor Gajah			Kampung Tengah		
Malacca	Alor Gajah			Malacca University (KUIM)	Malacca University (KUIM)	T-junctions
Malacca	Alor Gajah			Kampung Hilir		
Malacca	Alor Gajah			Kuala Sungai Baru	M161 Jalan Ramuan China–Kuala Sungai Baru – Ramuan China	T-junctions
Malacca	Alor Gajah		BR	Sungai Baru Bridge		
Malacca	Alor Gajah			Jalan Kuala Sungai Baru–Sungai Udang	M143 Malacca State Route M143 – Pengkalan Balak, Sungai Udang, Tanjung Bidara	T-junctions
Malacca	Alor Gajah			Taman Haji Abdullah Samad		
Malacca	Alor Gajah			Kampung Ujung Padang		
Malacca	Alor Gajah			Kampung Lubuk Redan		
Malacca	Alor Gajah			Kampung Pulau		
Malacca	Alor Gajah	0.0		Masjid Tanah; Kampung Jeram	FT 5 Malaysia Federal Route 5 – Linggi, Lubuk China, Masjid Tanah, Malacca	Junctions
Through to M142 Lubuk Redan–Masjid Tanah
