= Linggi River =

River in Negeri Sembilan and Malacca, Malaysia

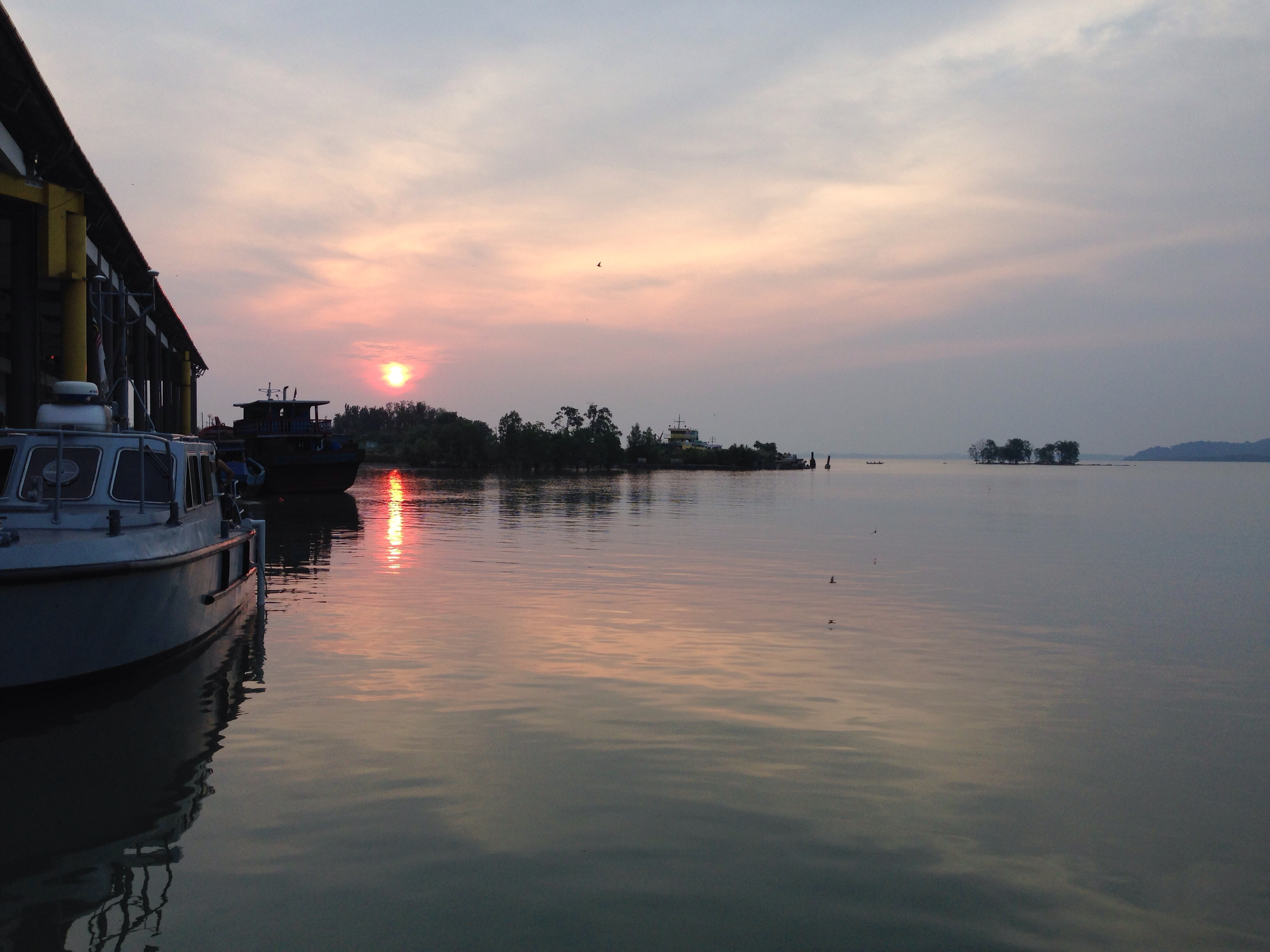
- A pier at the mouth of the Linggi, near the Negeri Sembilan-Malacca state border.

- Linggi River (Malacca) Linggi River (Negeri Sembilan) Linggi River (Peninsular Malaysia)
- Native name: Sungai Linggi (Malay)

Location
- Country: Malaysia
- State: Negeri Sembilan and Malacca

Physical characteristics
- Source: Titiwangsa Mountains
  - location: Telapak Buruk-Berembun massif near Pantai, Seremban District, Negeri Sembilan
  - coordinates: 2°49′02″N 101°59′14″E
- Mouth: Strait of Malacca
  - location: Kuala Linggi, Alor Gajah District, Malacca and Kampung Tanjung Agas, Port Dickson District, Negeri Sembilan
  - coordinates: 2°23′26″N 101°58′26″E
- Length: 83.5 km (51.9 mi)

Basin features
- Tributaries
  - right: Semin River; Rembau River
- Bridges: Jambatan Kampung Barisan; Jambatan Jalan Rantau; Jambatan Kuala Linggi
- Inland ports: Port of Kuala Sungai Linggi

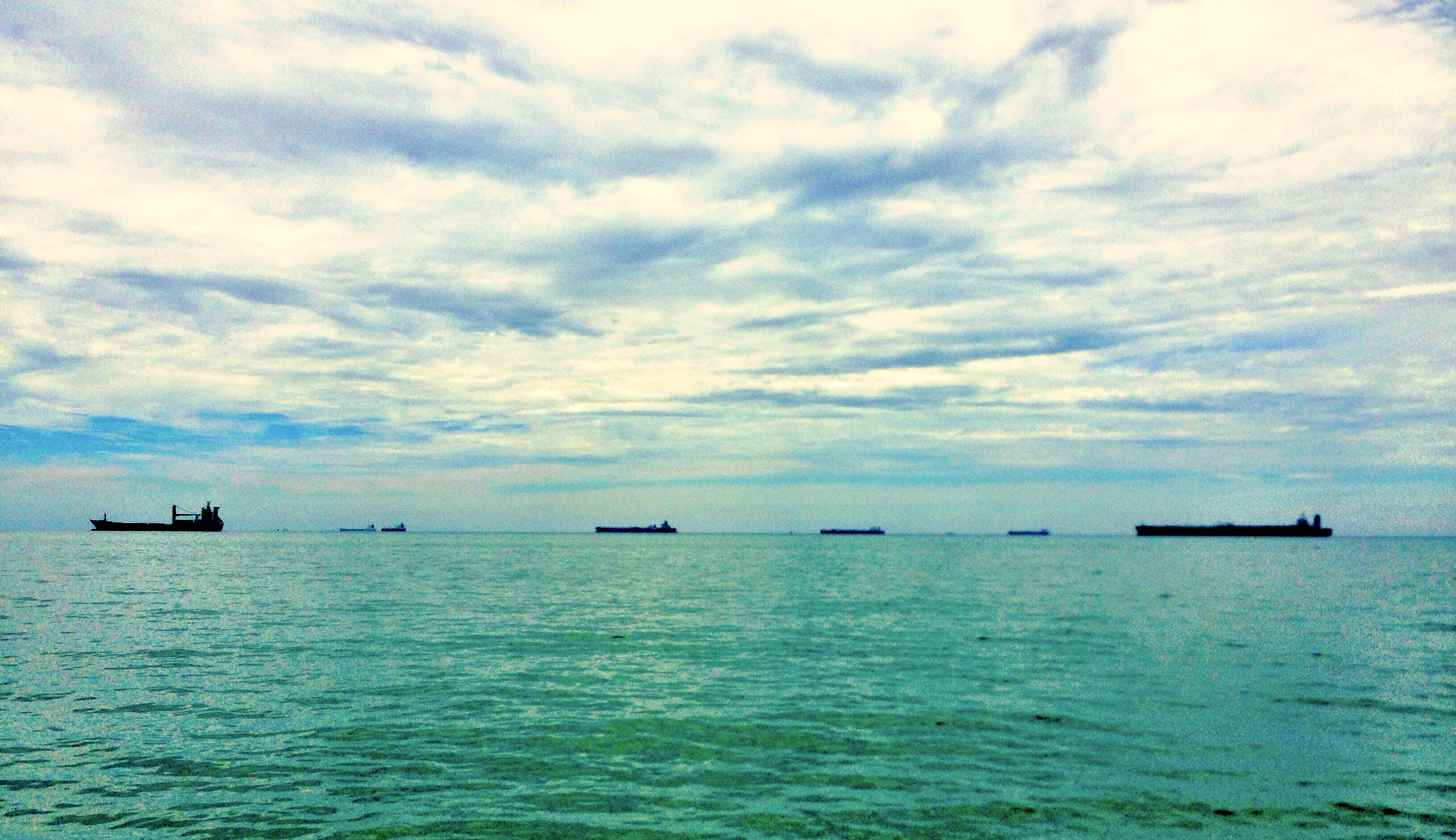
Oil tankers near the Linggi River mouth

The Linggi River (Malay: Sungai Linggi) is a river in Malaysia which flows through the states of Negeri Sembilan and Malacca. It is one of two major rivers that serve as water sources for most of Negeri Sembilan's population, the other being the Muar River, which lies within the state's eastern half.

== Toponymy ==
The name Linggi means 'stem' in Buginese and refers to the strongest vertical plate at the bow of a ship. The namesake town of Linggi, Negeri Sembilan on the river's eastern bank was predominantly settled by native Malays of Bugis descent (whom are mostly descendants of migrants from neighbouring Selangor state with ancestral roots in South Sulawesi, Indonesia) although most of Negeri Sembilan's ethnic Malays are of Minangkabau heritage. Portuguese cartographic records dating back to the 17th century refer the river as the Panagim.

== History ==
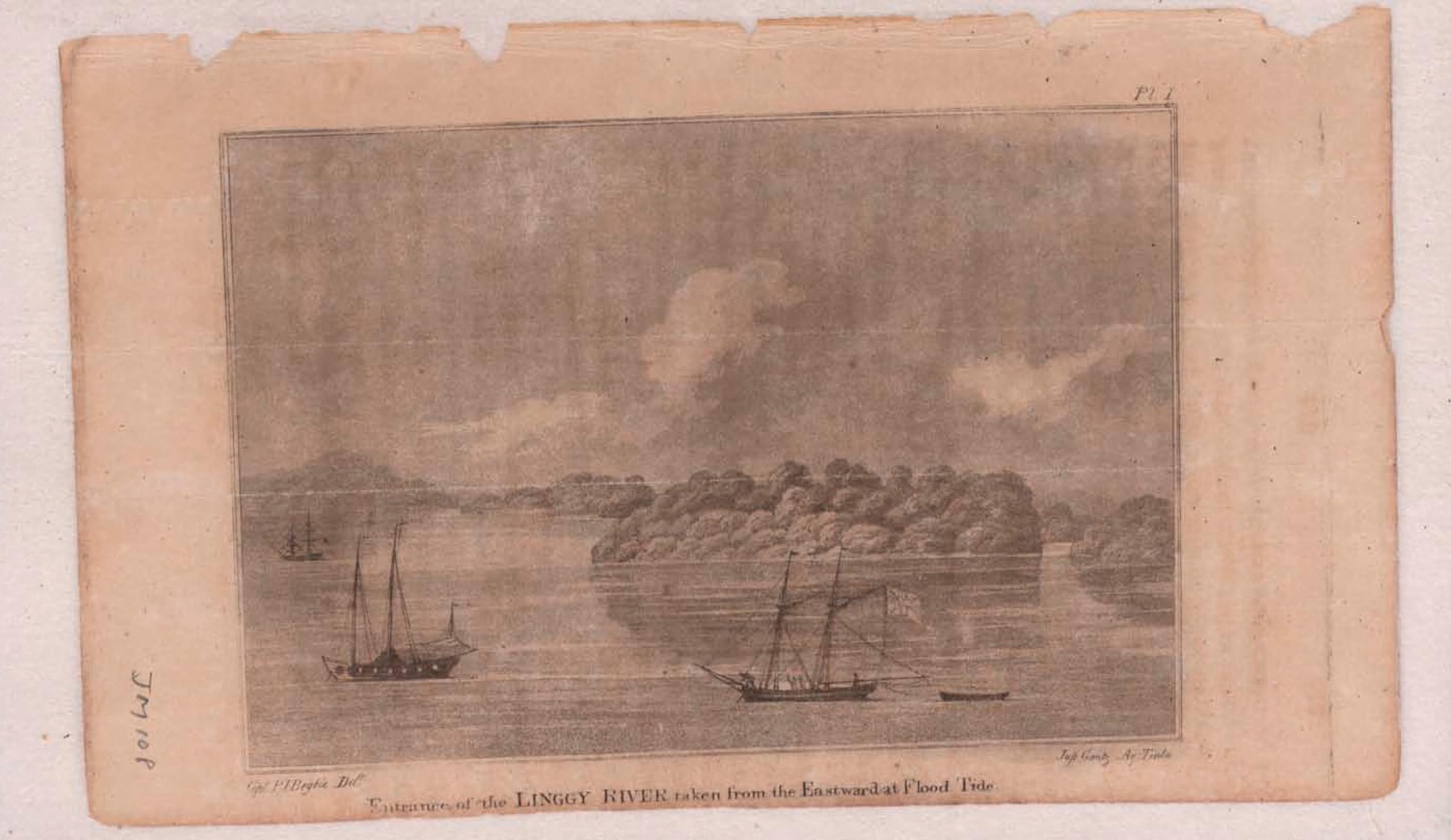
The river, known as the Linggy, as depicted in The Malayan Peninsula (1834) by P.J. Begbie.

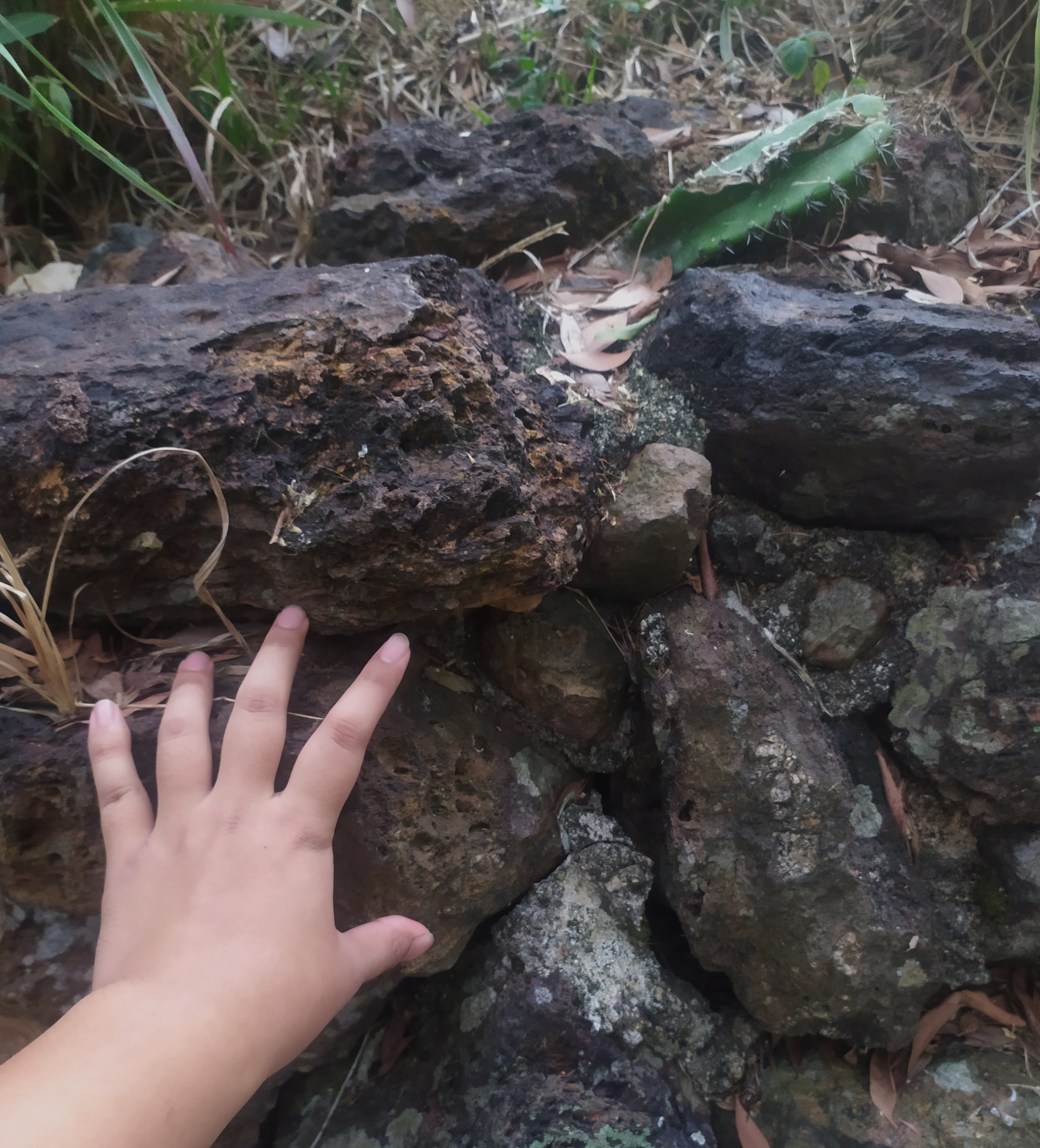
Details of masonry of the fortifications at Fort Supai.

The Linggi, alongside the Muar, played a key role as trade routes since the era of the Malacca Sultanate around the 15th century, as well as the main entry points for the Minangkabau people to enter what is now known as Negeri Sembilan. The former served as the only route linking the tin-rich area of Sungai Ujong to the eponymous port city of Malacca, while the latter was part of the famous Laluan Penarikan, a cross-peninsular riverine route that connects the town of Muar on the west coast with Pekan on the east coast, linking to the Pahang River via the Serting River in Jempol.

Several conflicts took place around the river in the 19th century:

=== Sungai Ujong–Selangor border dispute ===
In 1766, the sultanate of Selangor was founded under the leadership of Sultan Salehuddin after years of Buginese influx to the area, with Kuala Selangor being the first centre of administration. In the following years, they expanded south towards the Linggi River, annexing the area within Sepang River, which was previously under Sungai Ujong, in the process. This has led to the dissatisfaction of Dato' Klana Sendeng, the Undang of Sungai Ujong at the time, as the Linggi River was within his dominion, and he was also responsible for the taxations in the area as well.

In 1862, he expressed objection towards the Sultan of Selangor, Sultan Abdul Samad, over the annexation of the Linggi River, as well as Tanjung Tuan. A delegate of the sultanate, Raja Abdullah, was sent to negotiate with him regarding the border dispute a year later. Also present in the negotiation was Capt. Playfair of the Straits Settlement of Malacca. The negotiation ended with Raja Abdullah, in reluctance, cedes Lukut and the Linggi River to Sungai Ujong viva voce. Nevertheless, Selangorean nobles continued to rule over these areas.

The dispute rose again in 1866, which resulted in Sultan Abdul Samad cedes the river to Dato' Klana Sendeng as the boundary between the two territories two years later in a written statement, and it fared negative reactions from the nobles of Klang and Lukut. The dispute ensued until in 1878, where the crisis was solved in a treaty witnessed by B. Douglas, the Resident of Selangor; P.J. Murray, the Resident of Sungai Ujong; Sultan Abdul Samad and Dato' Klana Syed Abdul Rahman. Following the treaty, the border between Selangor and Sungai Ujong (later modern Negeri Sembilan) is set along the course of the Sepang River until today. An agreement regarding the cession of Lukut into Sungai Ujong was signed in Singapore on 30 July 1880. In response, Sungai Ujong ceded the northern part of its territory (Semenyih, Kajang, Bangi, Beranang and Broga) to Selangor.

=== Klana–Bandar conflict and British intervention in Sungai Ujong ===
Dato' Klana Syed Abdul Rahman had been rivals with another nobleman from the same area, Dato' Bandar Abdullah Tunggal. Syed Abdul Rahman was instated as the Undang of Sungai Ujong in 1872, in the wake of the death of his uncle, Dato' Klana Sendeng. Since then, they engaged in a tight competition in spreading their influence throughout the chiefdom, as well as to gain control over the Linggi River. Speaking of areas of influence, Dato' Klana Syed Abdul Rahman's dominion covers Ampangan, Setul, Lenggeng and parts of Seremban; while Dato' Bandar Abdullah Tunggal's cover Rasah, extending northwards to Labu.

The conflict stemmed from Abdullah Tunggal's rising popularity thanks to his profitable taxations imposed in the ports along the Linggi, including Rasah. Deeming him to be a direct competitor, Syed Abdul Rahman argued with him over the taxations in Kuala Linggi. Feeling threatened, the Dato' Klana sought for British assistance in restoring his position as the ruler of Sungai Ujong. On 21 April 1874, a treaty between the Dato' Klana and the British was sealed, of which he accepted being under the protection of the British Empire, as well as assigned the settlements of Sempang to Permatang Pasir to be under British control. With this treaty effective, Capt. P.J. Murray was appointed as the first Resident of Sungai Ujong, and Syed Abdul Rahman also restored his immunity as the Undang. In addition, this also granted the British full authority to collect taxes along the Linggi, only leading to the Dato' Bandar's ire once he learned about it. In retaliation, he firmly opposed against the treaty, and to a certain degree, sent death threats to the former.

Planning an uprising against Syed Abdul Rahman, Abdullah Tunggal's allies consisted of his fellow followers, Chinese miners, as well as his nephew, Raja Mahmud, including Raja Mahadi from Selangor. On 4 October, Sir Andrew Clarke, the Governor of the Straits Settlements, dispatched W.A. Pickering along with a team of policemen from Malacca to Sungai Ujong to coax the Dato' Bandar to make peace with the Dato' Klana, along with the Chinese miners to not partake in the conflict.

The conflict escalates as several diplomatic attempts between Syed Abdul Rahman and Abdullah Tunggal by Pickering and his men failed. The Dato' Bandar was last seen reinforcing his fortifications in Kepayang in a 14 November visit by Pickering to Sungai Ujong. Meanwhile, the Dato' Klana has appointed a new Dato' Bandar from the same suku (equivalent to a clan) by the name of Ahmad Bukit, and ordered him to declare war against the previous Dato' Bandar, Abdullah Tunggal. This clearly contradicts to the Adat Perpatih, where both of them should not wage war between each other since they are considered as relatives. Nevertheless, as there are no options left, he resorted into armed conflict to restore peace in Sungai Ujong. On 15 November, the Dato' Klana sent a letter to Abdullah Tunggal to come to Sungai Ujong in peace, of which the latter declined.

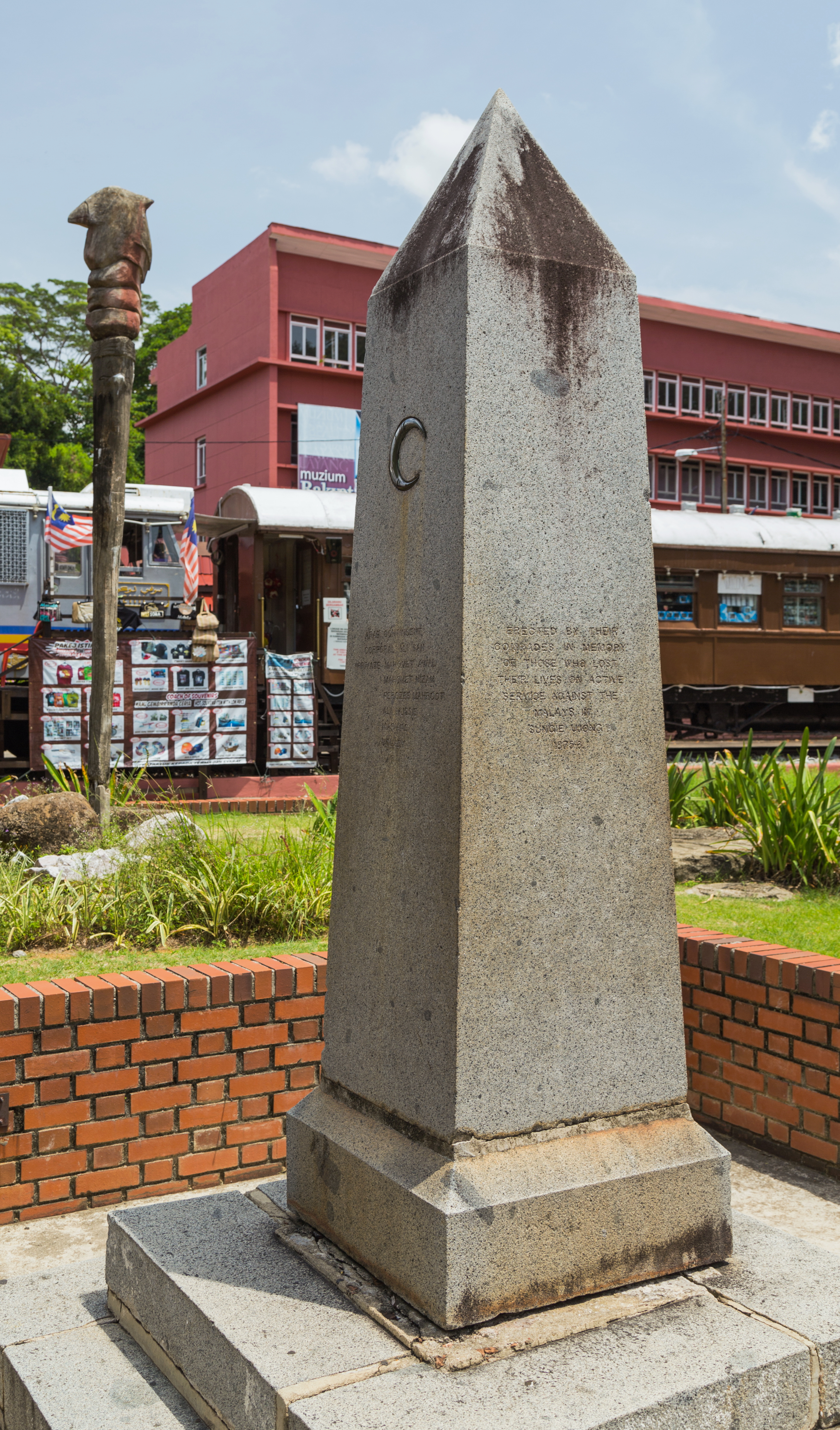
The Sungei Ujong War Memorial in Malacca City.

A civil war broke off on 16 November where Syed Abdul Rahman and his 400 men attacked and conquered two of Abdullah Tunggal's fortresses in Rahang and Rasah. The next day, he, along with Pickering and a team of 200 Malays, including Arabs, marched towards Kepayang, where they retreated back to Ampangan as Raja Mahmud came at his uncle's behest. Following the incident, he wrote a letter to Singapore for military backup. Meanwhile, Abdullah Tunggal reconquered his Rasah fortress with the aid from the people of Rembau, according to a report by Pickering to Capt. Shaw of Malacca. News revolving around the war spread to Malacca and Singapore, and Capt. Shaw dispatched a backup squad consisting of Lts. H.W. Palmer and G.B. Peyton, a sergeant, a bugler, and 26 soldiers from the 10th Regiment including some policemen. They set off to Sungai Ujong by sea and arrived in Ampangan via the Linggi River on 25 November, but prior to their arrival, Pickering's team successfully seized Rahang and Rasah from Abdullah Tunggal.

The civil war lasted until 17 December, where Abdullah Tunggal surrendered himself to Syed Abdul Rahman and the British in Sungai Ujong, and was exiled to Singapore on 15 January 1875, where he spent the rest of his life there and died. This event signifies the beginning of British rule in Sungai Ujong. In 1889, during the reign of Tuanku Muhammad, Seri Menanti, along with its peripheral chiefdoms, including Rembau and Tampin were combined into a single confederation known as the Confederacy of Seri Menanti, of which both Sungai Ujong and Jelebu later joined in 1895, forming the state of Negeri Sembilan at its modern borders. Following this, Tuanku Muhammad became the first Yamtuan Besar of modern Negeri Sembilan, and Martin Lister was made the first Resident. The newly formed state was then incorporated into the Federated Malay States along with Selangor, Perak and Pahang the same year.

== Course ==
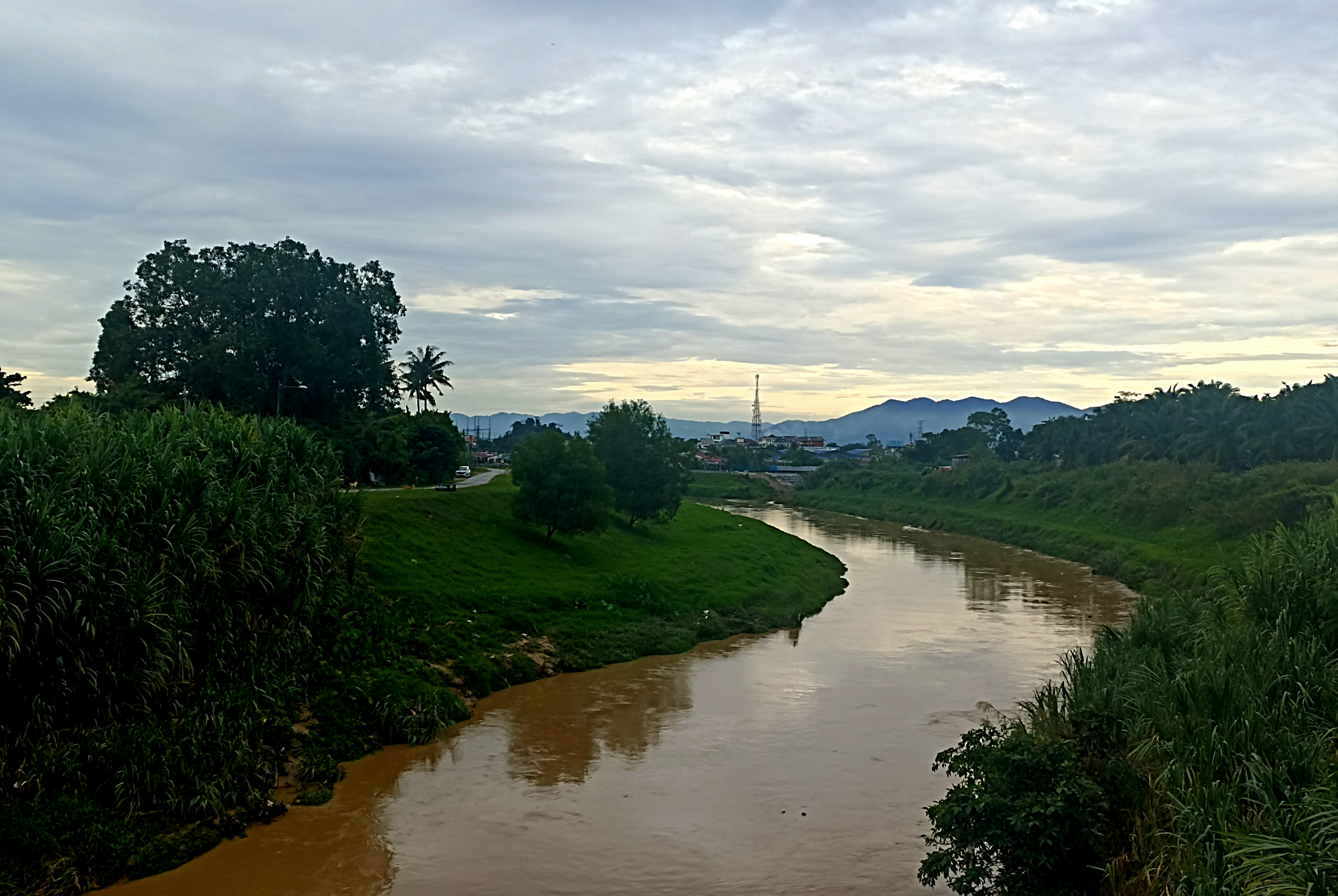
The Linggi near Rantau, looking upstream. The Titiwangsa Mountains are visible in the background.

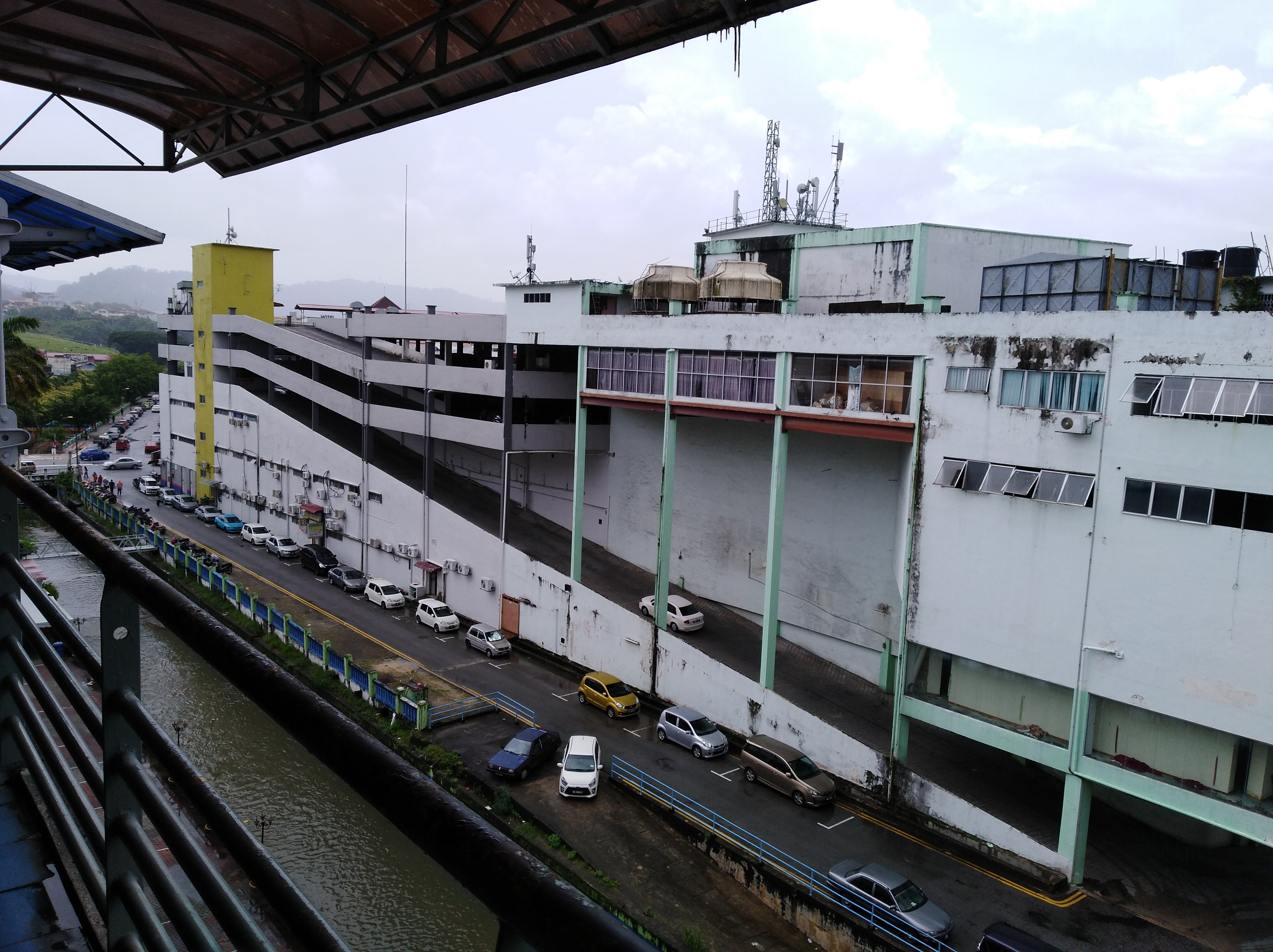
The Temiang River in downtown Seremban, a tributary of the Linggi.

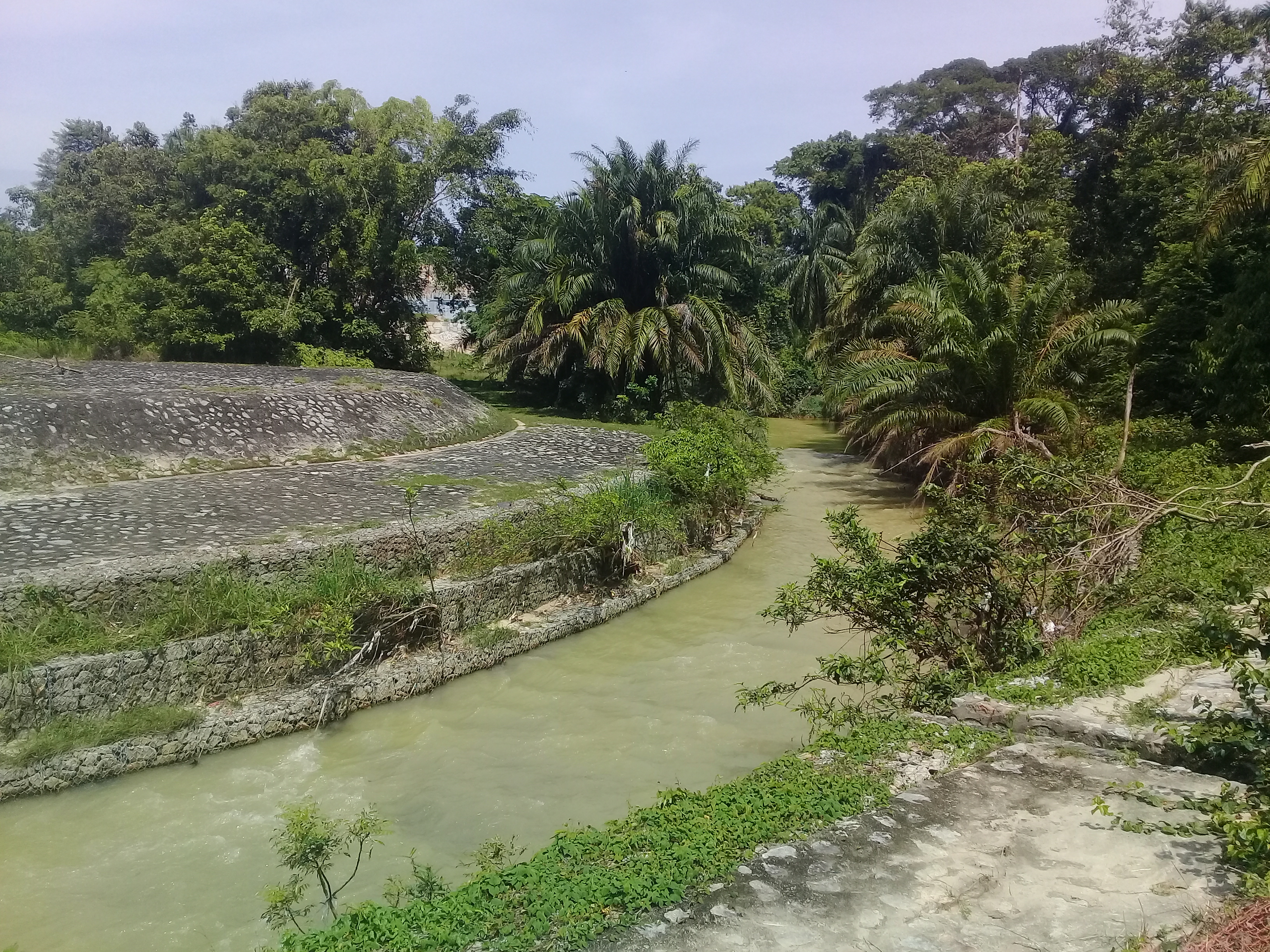
Pedas River, a tributary of the Linggi.

Sharing a common source with the Muar River, the Linggi starts from the western foothills of the Telapak Buruk-Berembun massif of the Negri Titiwangsa in Kampung Jerlang, Pantai in Seremban District, flowing southwards through the towns of Ampangan, Seremban, Rasah, Mambau and Rantau in the same district, Linggi in Port Dickson District and ends at the small coastal hamlet of Kuala Linggi in Alor Gajah District, Malacca, where a 360-metre long bridge connecting the two states is located.

== Tourism ==
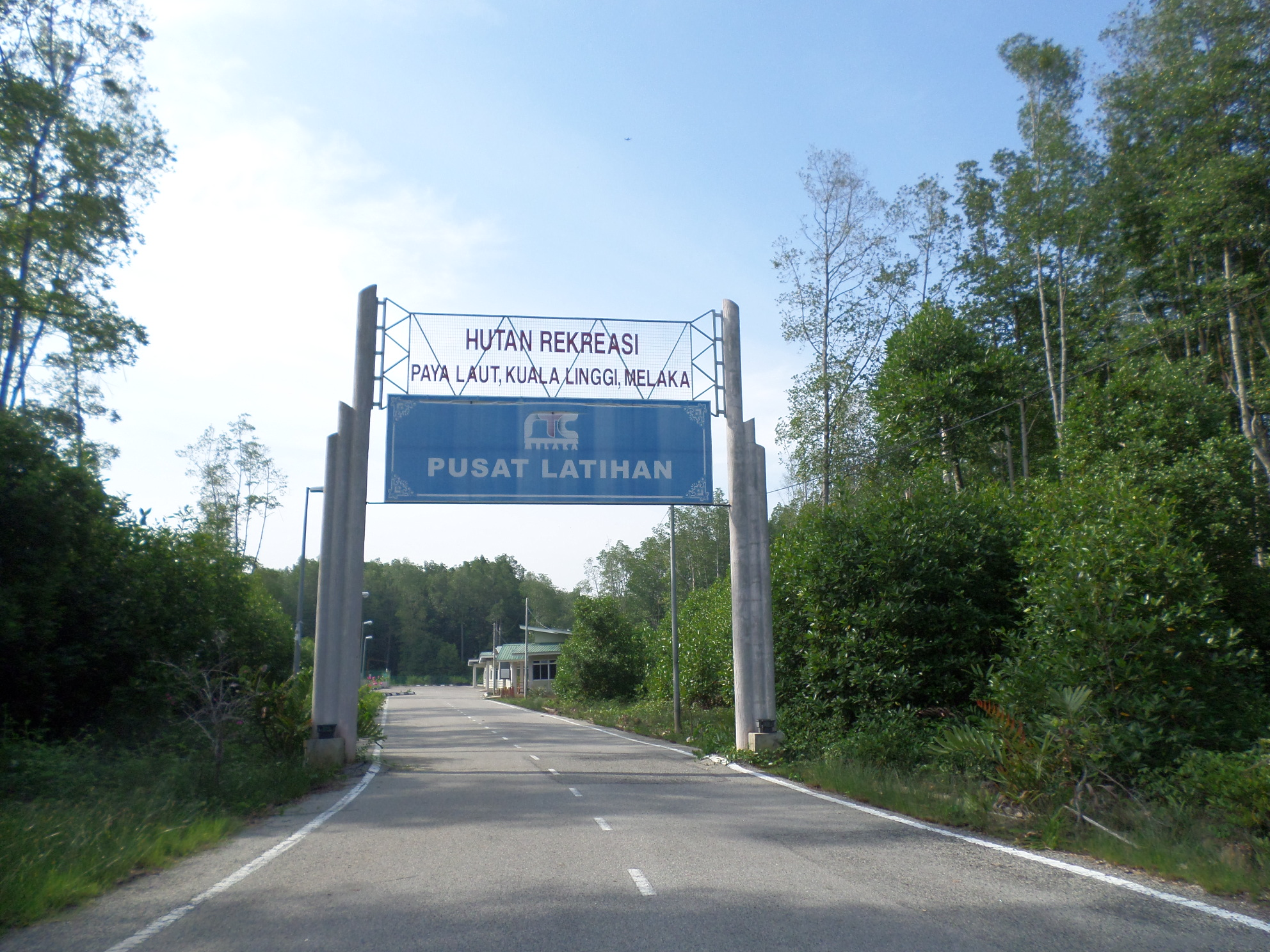
Kuala Linggi Mangrove Recreational Forest

The estuary of the Linggi River is known for its biodiversity and historical significance. It hosts one of the biggest population of saltwater crocodiles in the country. There is a sanctuary dedicated to the protection and conservation of saltwater crocodile habitat, situated in Kampung Tanjung Agas on the Negri side of the river. The mangrove forests along the estuary provides a habitat for fireflies and other marine life such as mudskippers and lokan, a type of bivalve. The Malaccan state government had designated the Paya Lebar section of the river's estuary as a major tourist attraction as an initiative to boost the economy of the state's north, where tourists will embark on a cruise through the river's lush mangrove swamps. Moreover, the mangrove forest at the Kuala Linggi section had been previously gazetted by the state government as a nature reserve, known as the Kuala Linggi Mangrove Recreational Forest.

Also present are the remnants of two fortresses, Fort Kuala Linggi (also known as Fort Supai and Fort Filiphina) in Kuala Linggi, and Fort Simpang in Paya Lebar, both were erected during the Dutch colonial period.

== Gallery ==
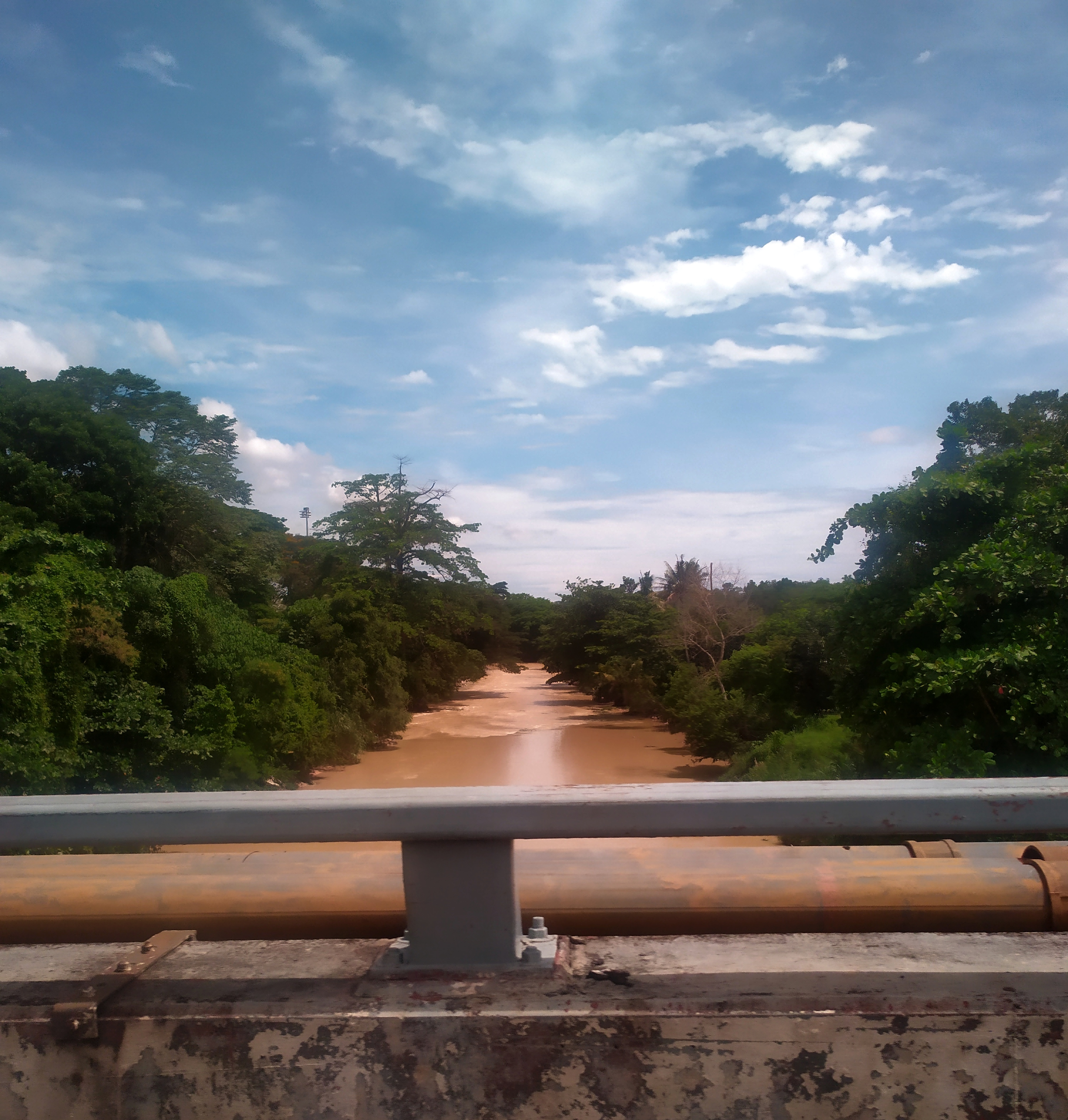
The Linggi at Rasah, looking downstream

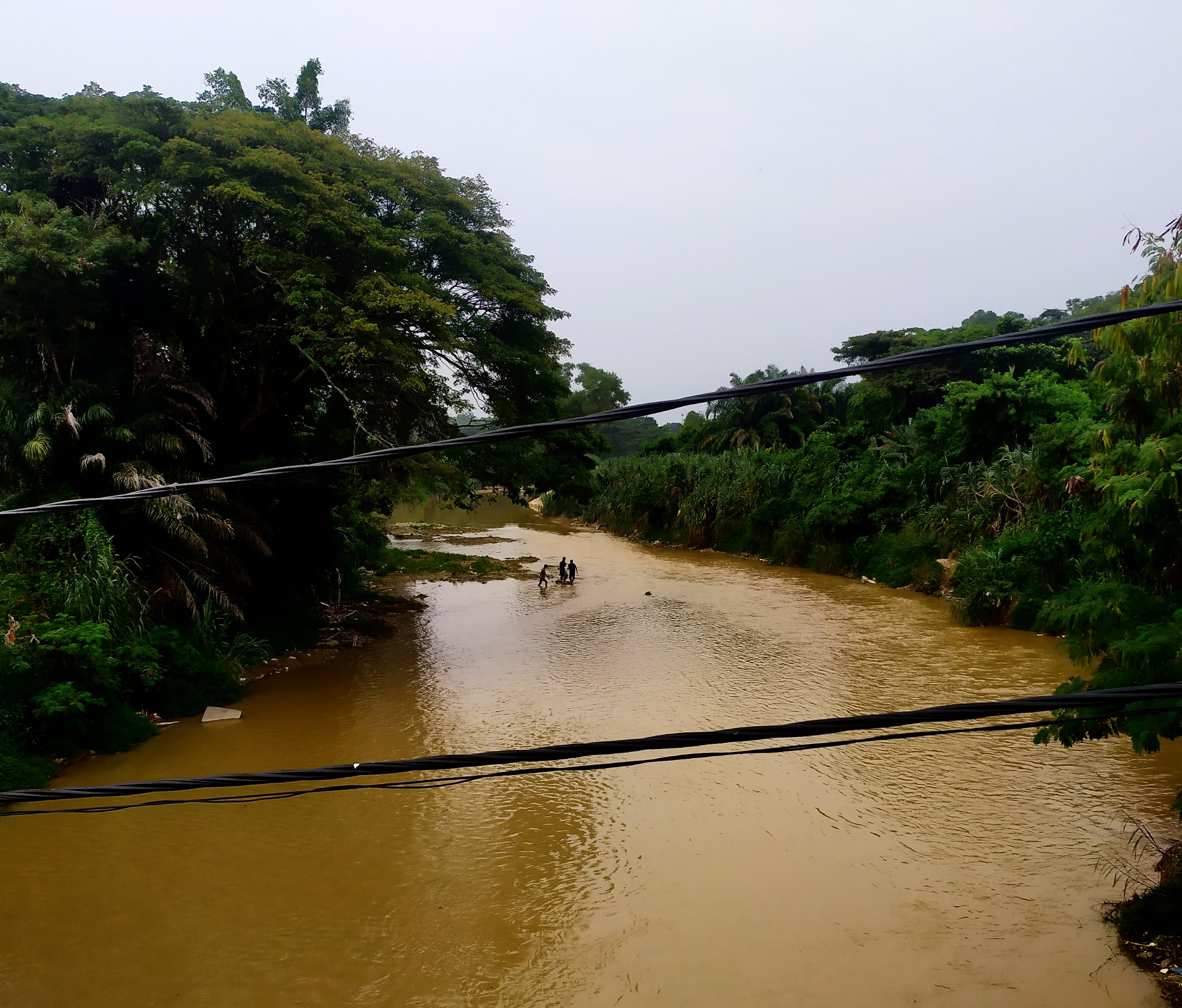
Village locals fishing in the river near Mambau

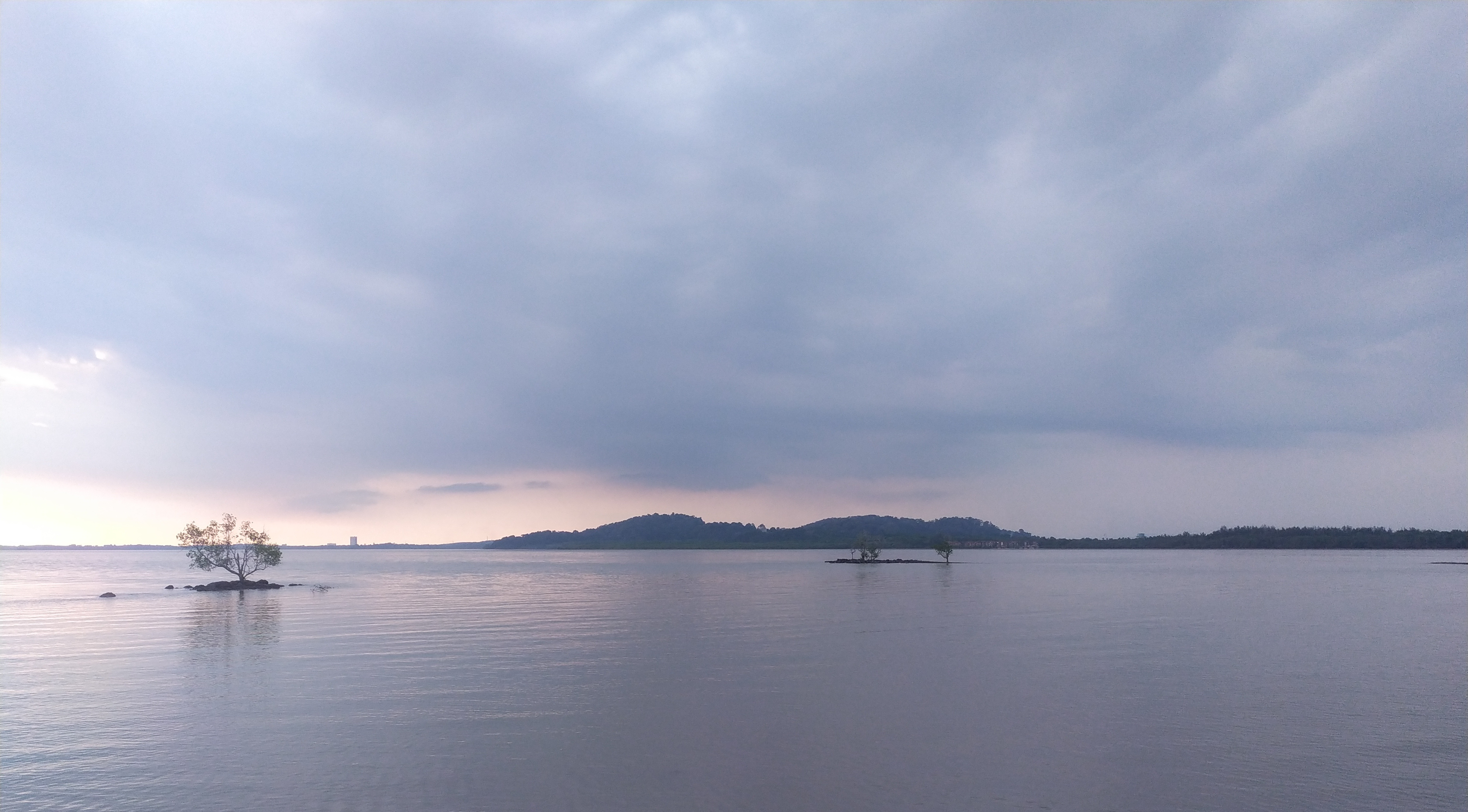
Skerries at the river's estuary

== See also ==
- List of rivers of Malaysia
- Port of Kuala Sungai Linggi
