= Malacca State Route M157 =

Road in Malaysia

Melaka Route 157
- Jalan Londang

Major junctions
- North end: Masjid Tanah
- FT 5 Federal Route 5 M143 State Route M143
- South end: Pengkalan Balak

Location
- Country: Malaysia
- Primary destinations: Londang, Tanjung Bidara

Highway system
- Highways in Malaysia; Expressways; Federal; State

Malacca State Route M157, Jalan Londang is a major road in Malacca, Malaysia. It is also a main route to Tanjung Bidara beach.

== Junction lists ==
The entire route is located in Alor Gajah District, Malacca.

Legend:

- I/C - Interchange, I/S - Intersection, RSA - Rest and service area, OBR - Overhead bridge restaurant, R/R - Restaurant and rest plaza, L/B - Layby, V/P - Vista point, TN - tunnel, T/P - Toll plaza, BR - Bridge
- C - Cloverleaf, S - Stack, T-A - Trumpet-A, T-B - Trumpet-B, DT - Directional-T/Y, SDT - Semi-Directional-T/Y, P-Y - Partial-Y, D - Diamond, P-C - Partial cloverleaf, D-D - Diverging diamond, D-R - Direct ramp

Location	km	mi	Destinations	Notes
Masjid Tanah			FT 5 Malaysia Federal Route 5 – Port Dickson, Lubuk China, Sungai Udang, Malacca City	T-junctions
Masjid Tanah			Kampung Beringin	
Masjid Tanah			Kampung Solok Ayer Kelulut	
Londang			Londang Town Centre	
Londang			Kampung Solok Kemang	
Pengkalan Balak			Malacca Matriculation College (KMM)	T-junctions
Pengkalan Balak			M143 Malacca State Route M143 – Port Dickson, Kuala Sungai Baru, Sungai Udang, Tanjung Bidara beach Pengkalan Balak beach V	Roundabout
1.000 mi = 1.609 km; 1.000 km = 0.621 mi
