= Kuala Linggi Bridge =

Bridge in Malaysia

Kuala Linggi Bridge Jambatan Kuala Linggi
- Coordinates: 2°23′48″N 101°58′58″E
- Carries: Motor vehicles, Pedestrians
- Crosses: Linggi River
- Locale: Malaysia Federal Route 138
- Maintained by: Malaysian Public Works Department (JKR) Alor Gajah and Port Dickson

Characteristics
- Design: box girder bridge
- Total length: 360 metres
- Width: --
- Longest span: --

History
- Designer: Government of Malaysia; Malaysian Public Works Department (JKR)
- Constructed by: Malaysian Public Works Department (JKR)
- Opened: July 10, 1990

Location
- Interactive map of Kuala Linggi Bridge

The Kuala Linggi Bridge (Malay: Jambatan Kuala Linggi) is a bridge border of Negeri Sembilan and Malacca crossing Linggi River, Malaysia. The bridge is located near Dutch Fort in Melaka side. Built at a cost of RM 20 million, it was officially opened on 10 July 1990 by fourth Malaysian Prime Minister, Mahathir Mohamad.

== See also ==
- Transport in Malaysia
