= Konet Island =

Islet off the shores of Telok Gong in Kuala Sungai Baru, Malacca, Malaysia

Native name: Pulau Konet

Geography
- Location: Strait of Malacca
- Coordinates: 2°20′39″N 102°2′39″E
- Area: 0.014 km^{2} (0.0054 sq mi)

Administration
- Malaysia
- State: Malacca
- District: Alor Gajah
- Mukim: Kuala Sungai Baru

Konet Island (Malay: Pulau Konet) is a tidal island located 100 metres off the shores of Telok Gong in Kuala Sungai Baru, Malacca, Malaysia. It is rich with corals and colourful ornamental fishes, connected to the mainland by a tombolo and is accessible by foot at low tide. Similar to Besar Island and according to local legends, the island is also believed to be the home of the elves known as Orang bunian. Another islet with similar feature, Keramat Island, is located 50 metres west of this islet.

== See also ==
- List of islands of Malaysia
