= Kuala Linggi Mangrove Recreational Forest =

Forest in Alor Gajah, Malacca, Malaysia

Kuala Linggi Mangrove Recreational Forest Malay: Hutan Rekreasi Paya Laut Kuala Linggi
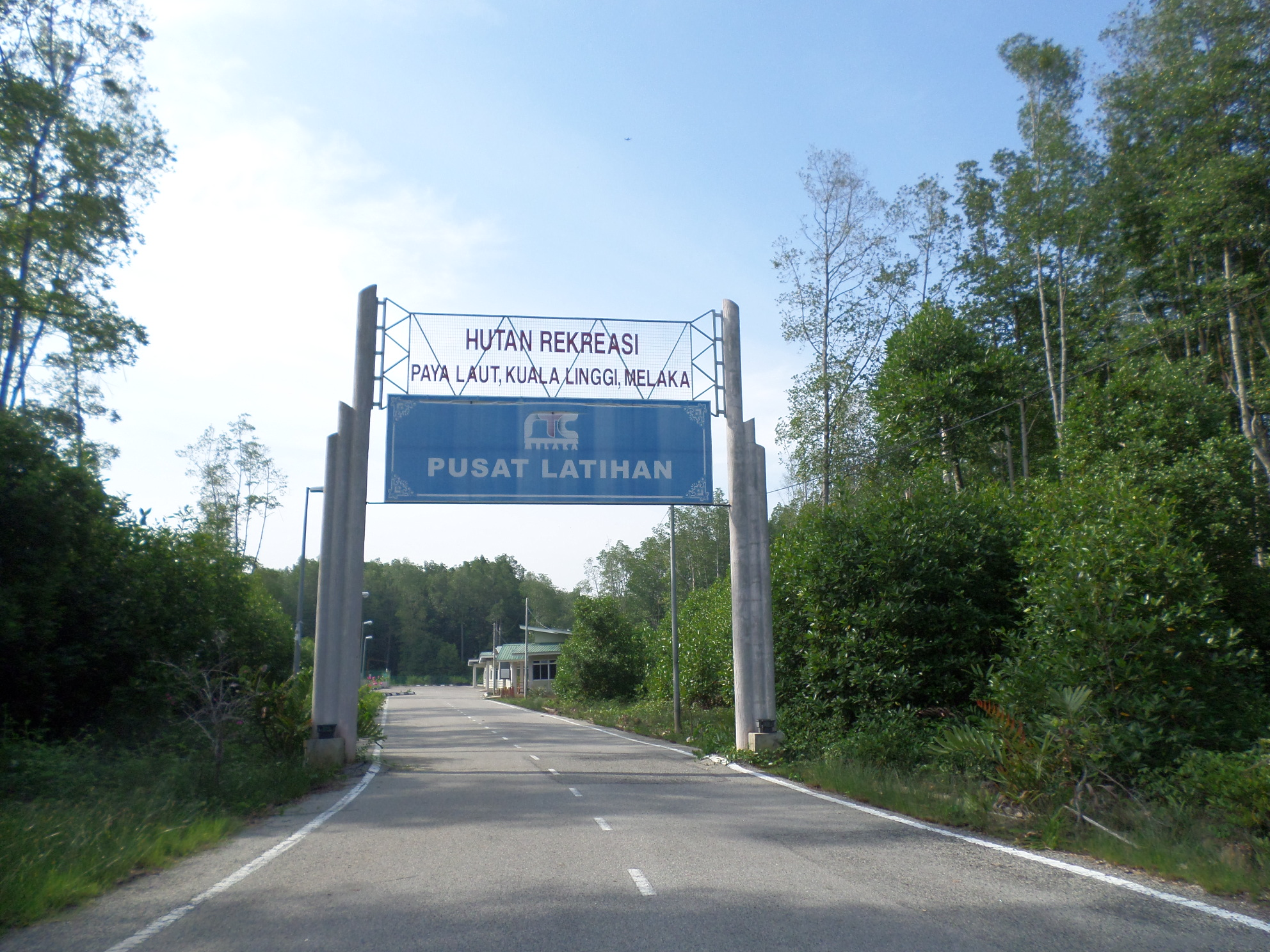

- Location within Malacca
- Interactive map of Kuala Linggi Mangrove Recreational Forest

Geography
- Location: Kuala Linggi, Kuala Sungai Baru, Alor Gajah, Malacca, Malaysia
- Coordinates: 2°23′36.6″N 101°59′01.8″E

The Kuala Linggi Mangrove Recreational Forest (Malay: Hutan Rekreasi Paya Laut Kuala Linggi) is a mangrove forest located in Kuala Linggi near Kuala Sungai Baru, Alor Gajah District, Malacca, Malaysia, on the south bank of the Linggi River estuary.

== See also ==
- Geography of Malaysia
- List of tourist attractions in Malacca
