= Kuala Sungai Baru =

- Suburb
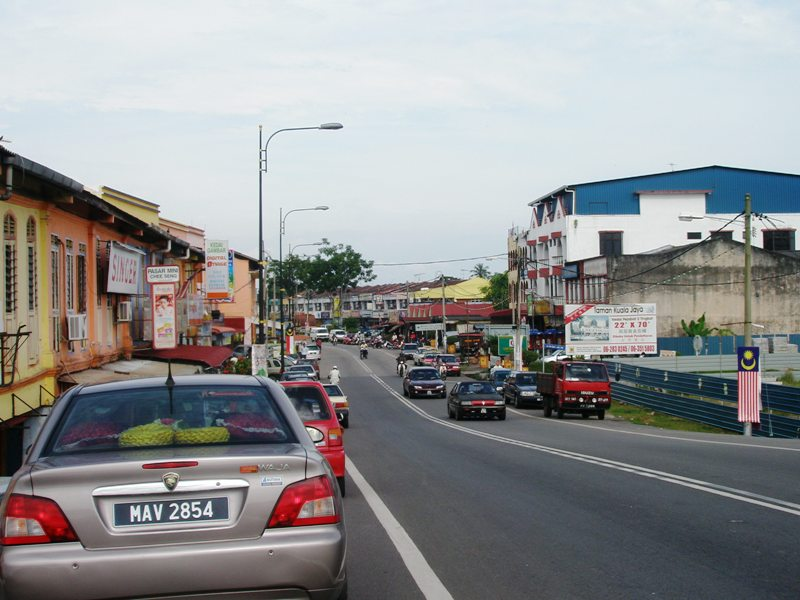
- Shophouses lining up Kuala Sungai Baru main road, picture taken on 17 November 2007.
- Interactive map of Kuala Sungai Baru
- Coordinates: 2°21′N 102°02′E
- Country: Malaysia
- State: Malacca
- Town: Alor Gajah
- District: Alor Gajah

Area
  - Total: 11.55 km^{2} (4.46 sq mi)
  - Suburb: 11.45 km^{2} (4.42 sq mi)
  - Town: 0.10 km^{2} (0.039 sq mi)

Population
  - Total: 7,663
  - Density: 663.5/km^{2} (1,718/sq mi)
- Postal code: 78200

Kuala Sungai Baru (also spelt Kuala Sungei Bharu, translated as New River Mouth) is a mukim and town in Alor Gajah District, Malacca, Malaysia, with fishing as main economic activity. It is situated midway between Kuala Linggi and Pengkalan Balak and is approximately 15 kilometers from Masjid Tanah.

== Education ==
Kindergarten

- Al-Falah Cemerlang
- Kampung Permatang Social Welfare Department Kindergarten

Primary Schools

- Darul Falah Religious Primary School
- Kuala Linggi National Primary School
- Othman Shawal National Primary School

Secondary Schools

- Rahmat National Secondary School
- Darul Falah Religious Secondary School (State Islamic Religious Department Affiliated)

Tertiary Institutions

- Universiti Islam Melaka (UniMEL) - (translated as Malacca Islamic University) The state government's private university which focused on Islamic Science, Psychology and Technology disciplines. It was established in 1996 as Malacca International Islamic Technology College (Malay: Kolej Teknologi Islam Antarabangsa Melaka, KTIAM) under the Act of Private Higher Educational Institutions 1996, upgraded by the Ministry of Higher Education to Malacca Islamic University College (Malay: Kolej Universiti Islam Melaka, KUIM) in 2009 and upgraded again to a fully fledged University on 8 April 2021.
- Malaysian Maritime Academy - A maritime training academy in Malaysia wholly owned by MISC Berhad with a 30 hectares campus in the town, which provides training for seagoing personnel.

== Infrastructures ==
- Port of Kuala Sungai Linggi - Commercially known as Linggi International Floating Transshipment & Trading HUB (LIFT-HUB), it is a transshipment area for liquid bulk transshipments and break-bulking located offshore of Linggi River in the Strait of Malacca.
- KSB Village Resort - A privately owned 36 room resort in the vicinity of the Kuala Sungai Baru town.

== Religious sites ==
- Al-Fatah Mosque, Kampung Ladang
- Al-Hasaniah Mosque
- Al-Muttaqin Mosque
- Nur Alam Tanjung Dahan Mosque
- Surau Ar-Raudhah
- Surau At-Taufiqiyah
- Surau Kampung Permatang Tengah
- Surau Nur Jannah
- Surau Taman Kuala Permai

== Tourist attractions ==
- Konet Island - An islet located 100 metres off the shores of Telok Gong, it is connected to the mainland by a tombolo and is accessible by foot at low tide.
- Kuala Linggi Mangrove Recreational Forest - Mangrove recreational forest at the mouth of the Linggi River, near the border between Negeri Sembilan and Malacca.
- Kuala Linggi Fort - A fort that was built at Kampung Kuala Linggi and atop the Bukit Supai (Sepoy’s Hill). It was erected by the Dutch and Bugis soldiers as a sign of friendship after a war which took place from 1756 until 1757, strategically located in an area capable of monitoring the incoming and outgoing river traffic in the past. Besides being known as "Supai Fort", it was also known as Fort Filiphina, after the name of the Dutch Governor’s daughter at that time. According to local history, the agreement between the Dutch and Bugis soldiers took place on 1 January 1758. This agreement empowered the Dutch control over the Linggi area and the tin trading. The square shaped fort was erected from an arrangement of laterite stones. For defense, a semi circle was made at each corner of the fort where cannons were placed.
- Cape Rachado Lighthouse - A lighthouse located in Tanjung Tuan, believed to be the oldest in the country, with its history allegedly dating back to Portuguese rule of Malacca during the 16th century.

== Gallery ==
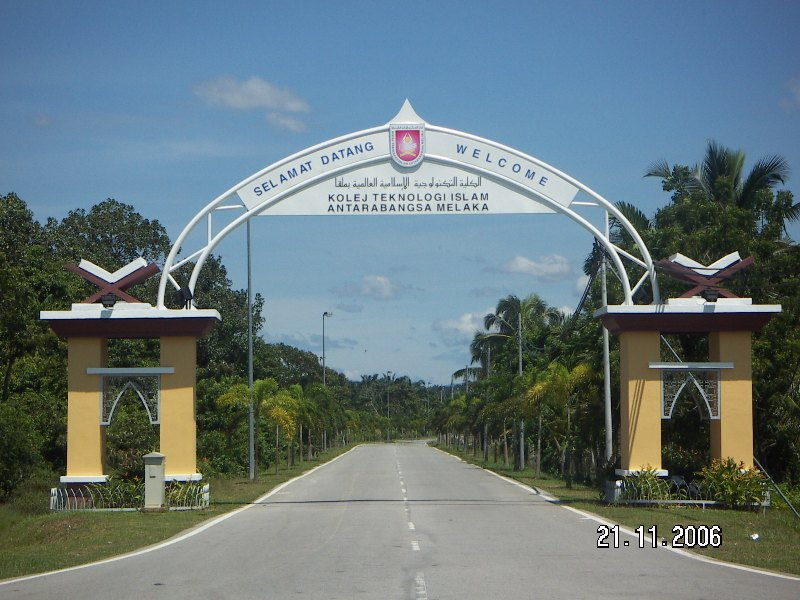
Entrance to Melaka International Islamic Technology College (now Universiti Islam Melaka).

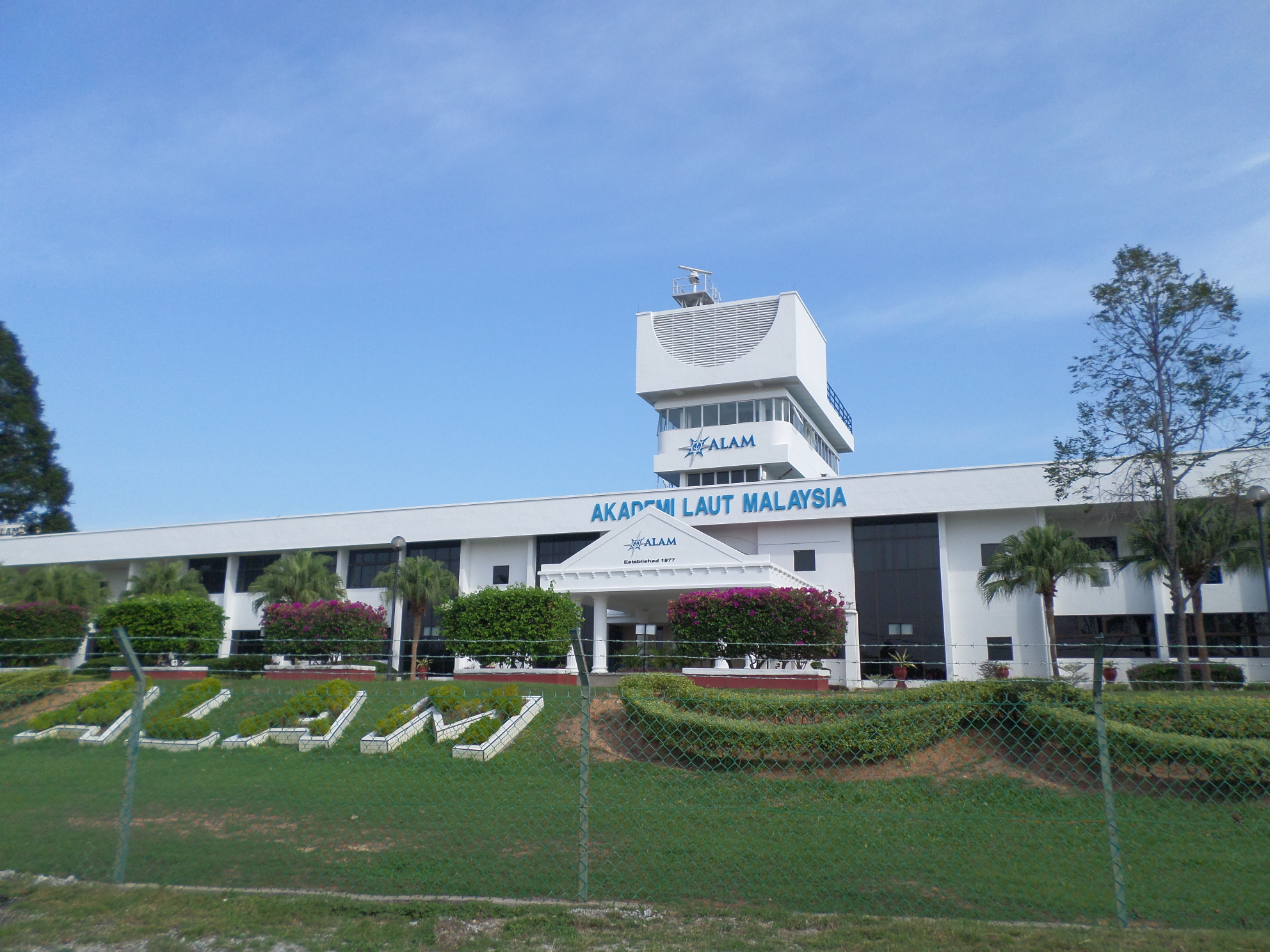
Exterior of the Malaysian Maritime Academy.

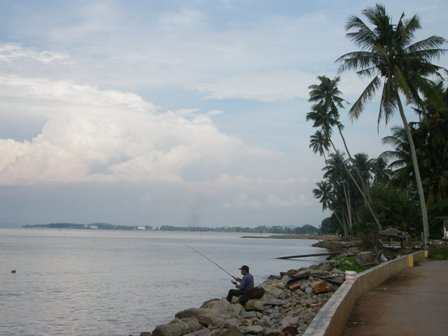
Fishing is popular in Kuala Sungai Baru

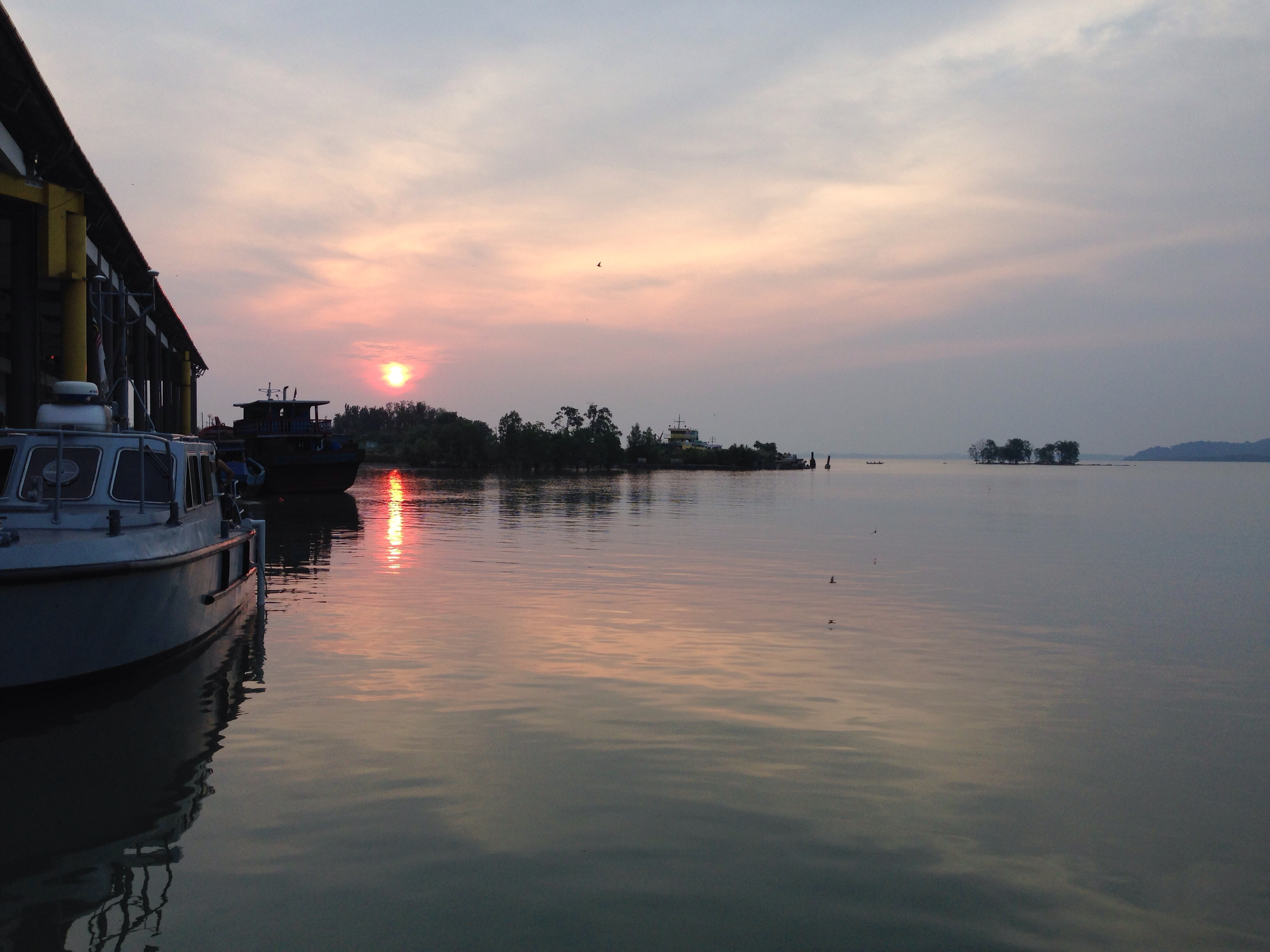
Linggi Pier, where barter trade activity took place, as a fishing jetty.

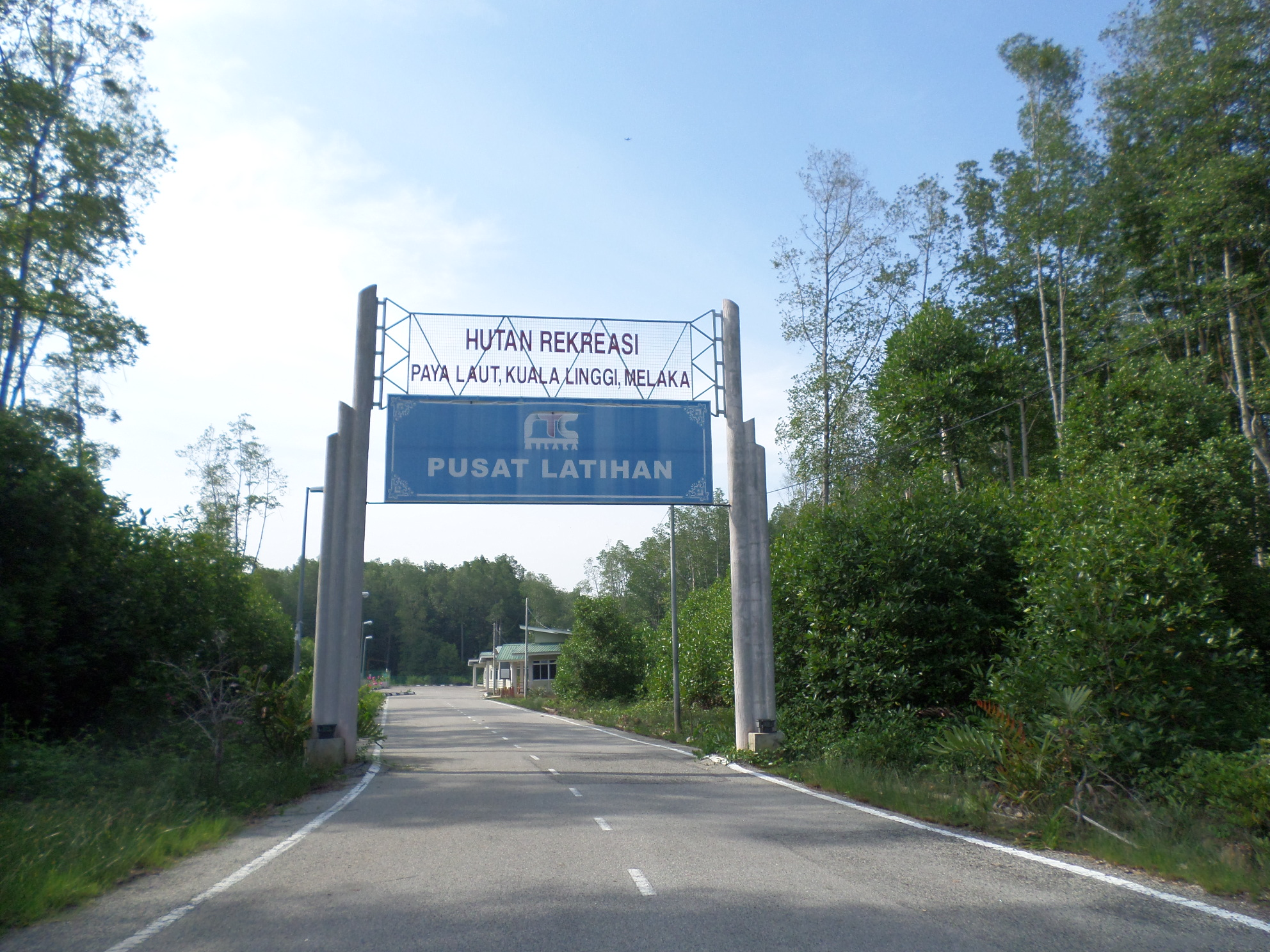
Kuala Linggi Mangrove Recreational Forest Entrance

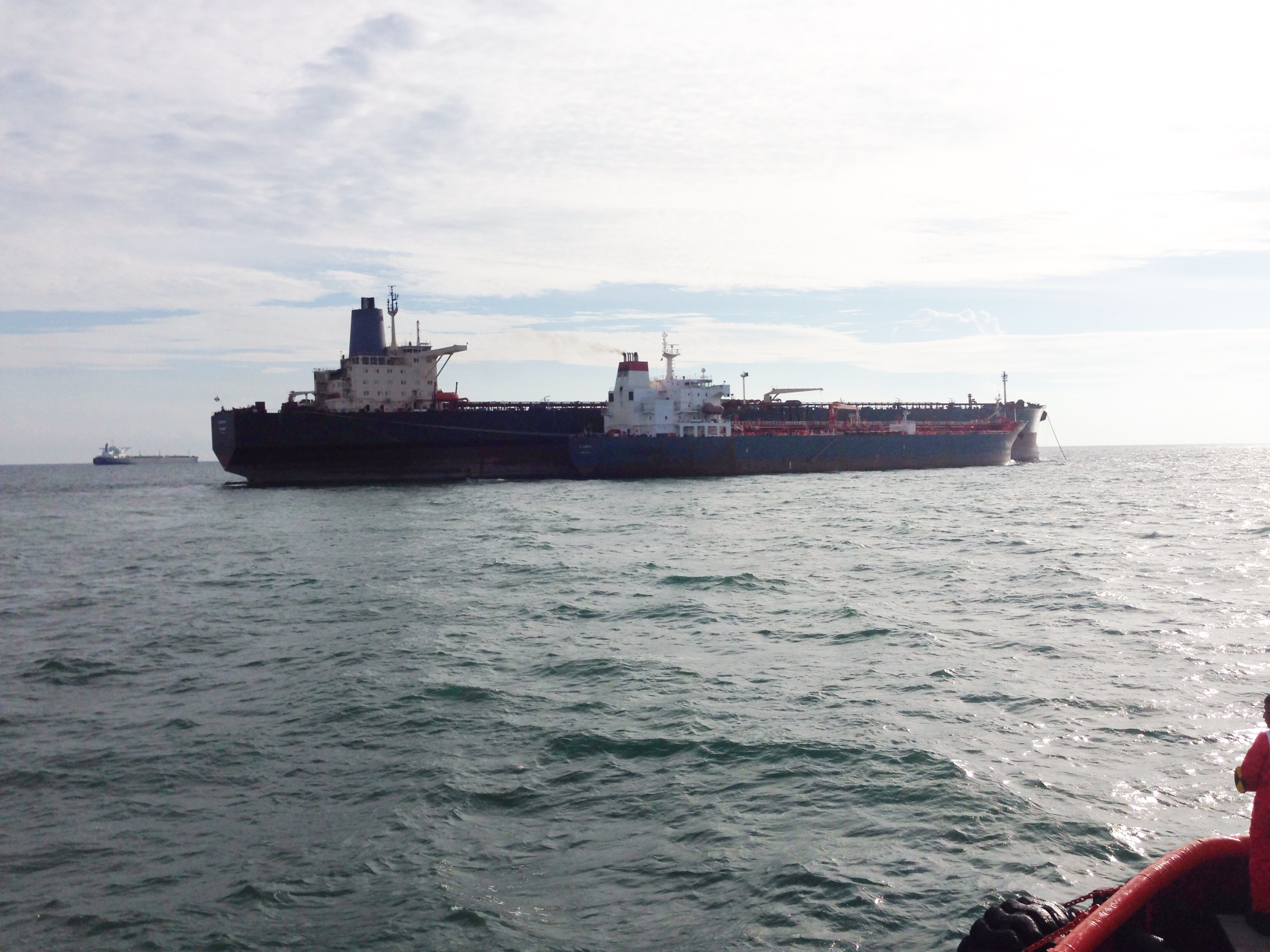
On going Ship to Ship operation at Linggi Port

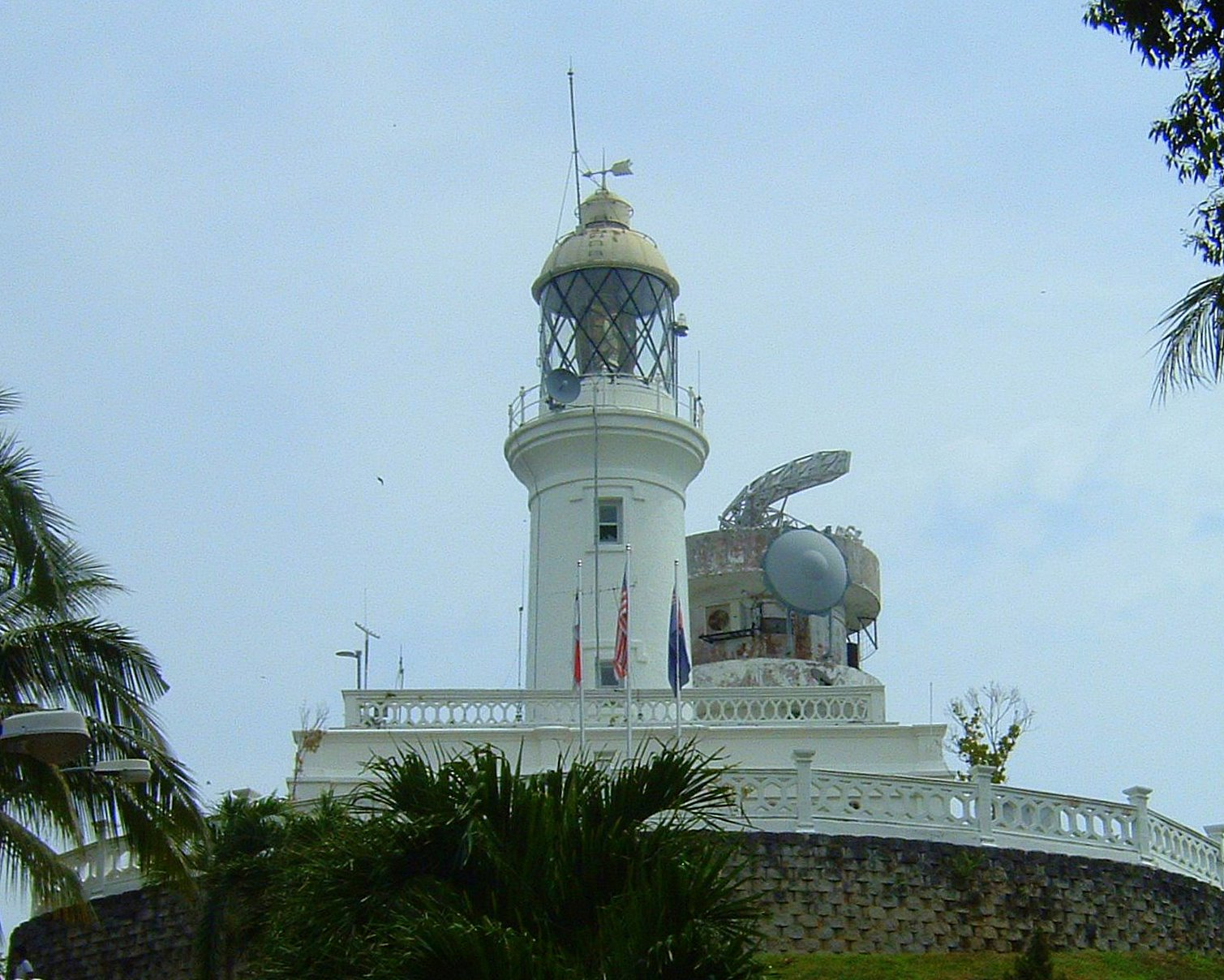
Cape Rachado Lighthouse

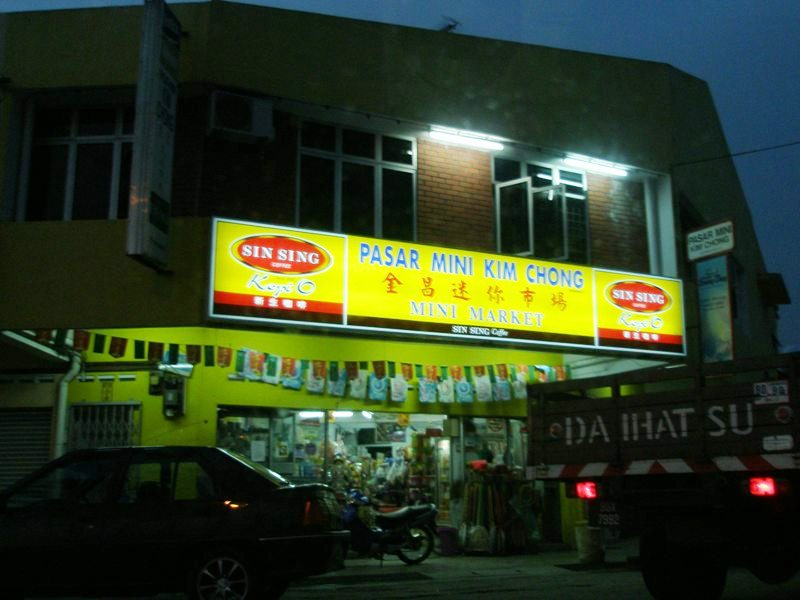
Kim Chong grocery shop is famous within the Kuala Sungai Baru people

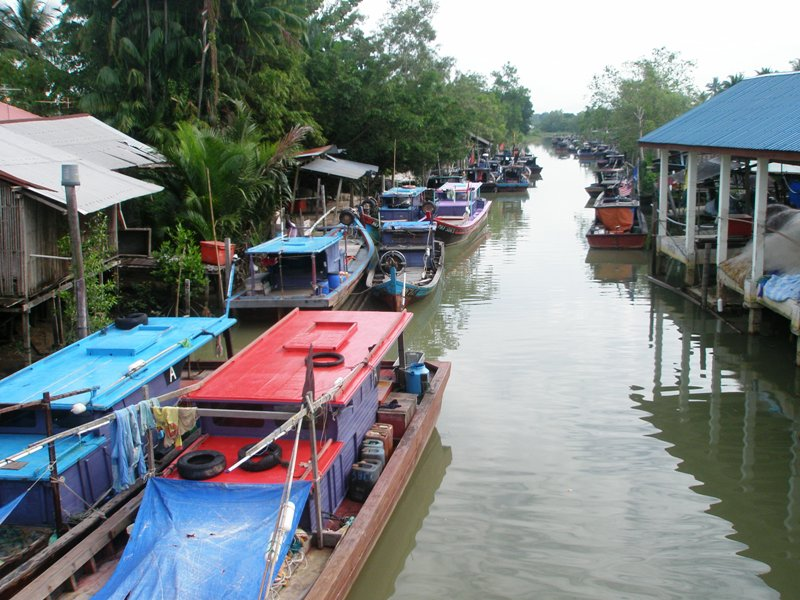
Boatpark

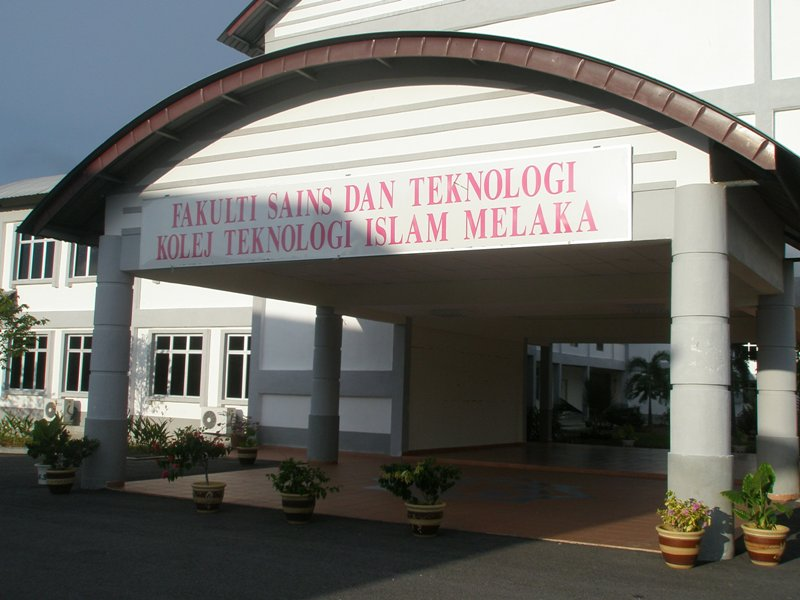
Faculty of Science and Technology is one of the university college's faculties

== See also ==
- Alor Gajah
