= Malaysian Maritime Academy =

Malaysian Maritime Academy logo

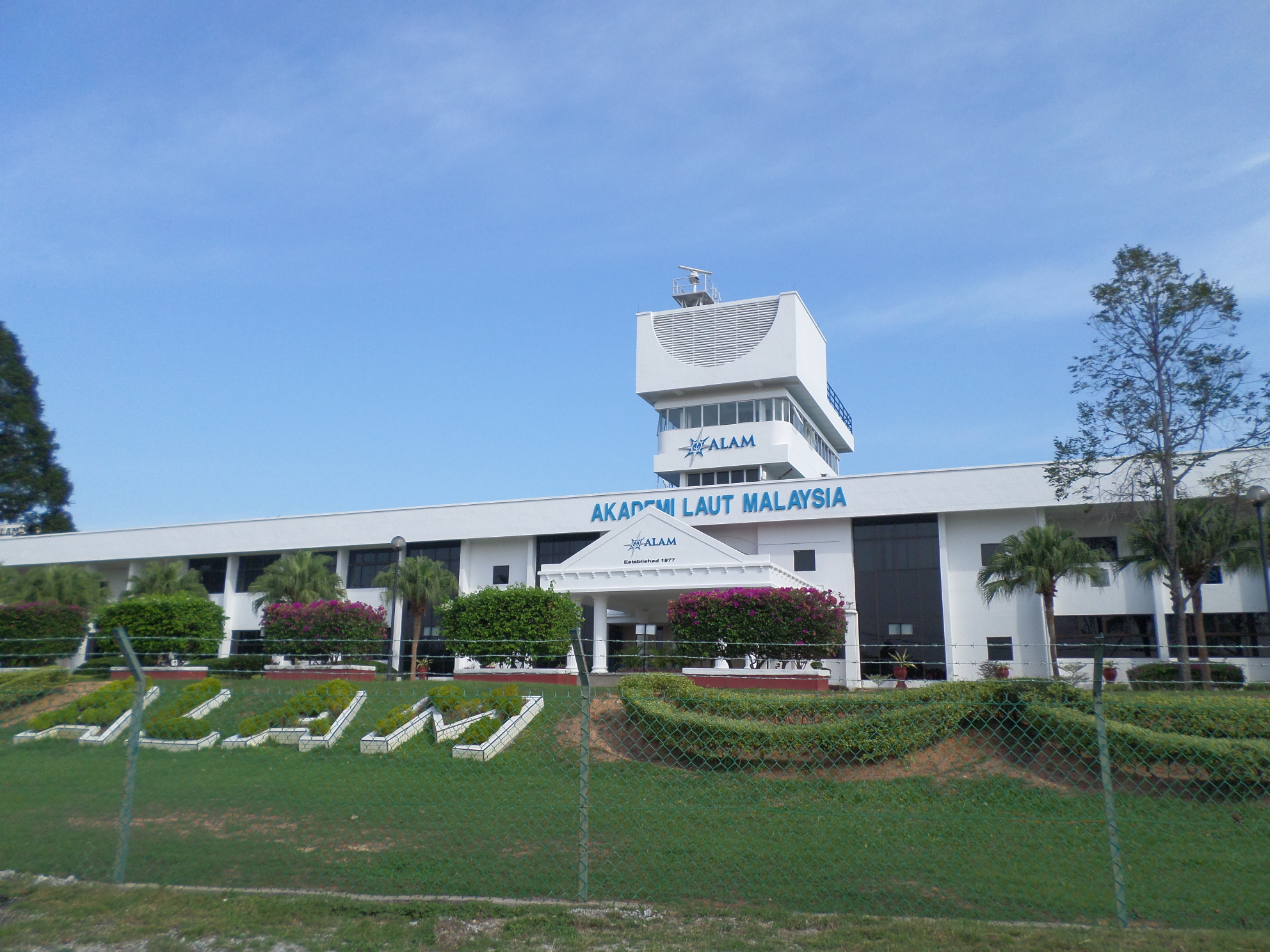
Malaysian Maritime Academy

Malaysian Maritime Academy (Malay: Akademi Laut Malaysia, MMA or ALAM) is a maritime training academy with a 30 hectares campus located in Kuala Sungai Baru, Malacca, Malaysia which provides training for seagoing personnel. It was established in 1976 by MISC Berhad, International Shipping Carriers Hong Kong and the Malaysian Ministry of Transport as the MATES Foundation (Malaysian Training and Education for Seamen). In the beginning, only male cadets are enrolled into the academy.

Malaysian Maritime Academy was only known by its present name, when it was upgraded to an academy with the award of government charter by former prime minister, Tun Dr. Mahathir Mohammad in 1981 and was subsequently placed under the supervision of the Implementation and Coordination unit, Prime Minister's Department. In 1997, it was privatised to Malaysian Maritime Academy Sdn. Bhd. (MMASB), a consortium comprising MISC Berhad, Petronas (Petroliam Nasional Berhad), Penang Shipbuilding and Construction Sdn. Bhd. and Klang Port Management Sdn. Bhd. Malaysian Maritime Academy only became fully owned by MISC Berhad in 2006 and began accepting female cadets the same year.

== Faculties ==
- Nautical Studies
- Marine Engineering
- Deck Able Seafarer
- Engine Able Seafarer
- Additional STCW and OPITO approved courses.

== See also ==
- Petronas
  - MISC Berhad
- Royal Malaysian Navy
