= Port of Kuala Sungai Linggi =

Port in the Malacca Strait, Malaysia

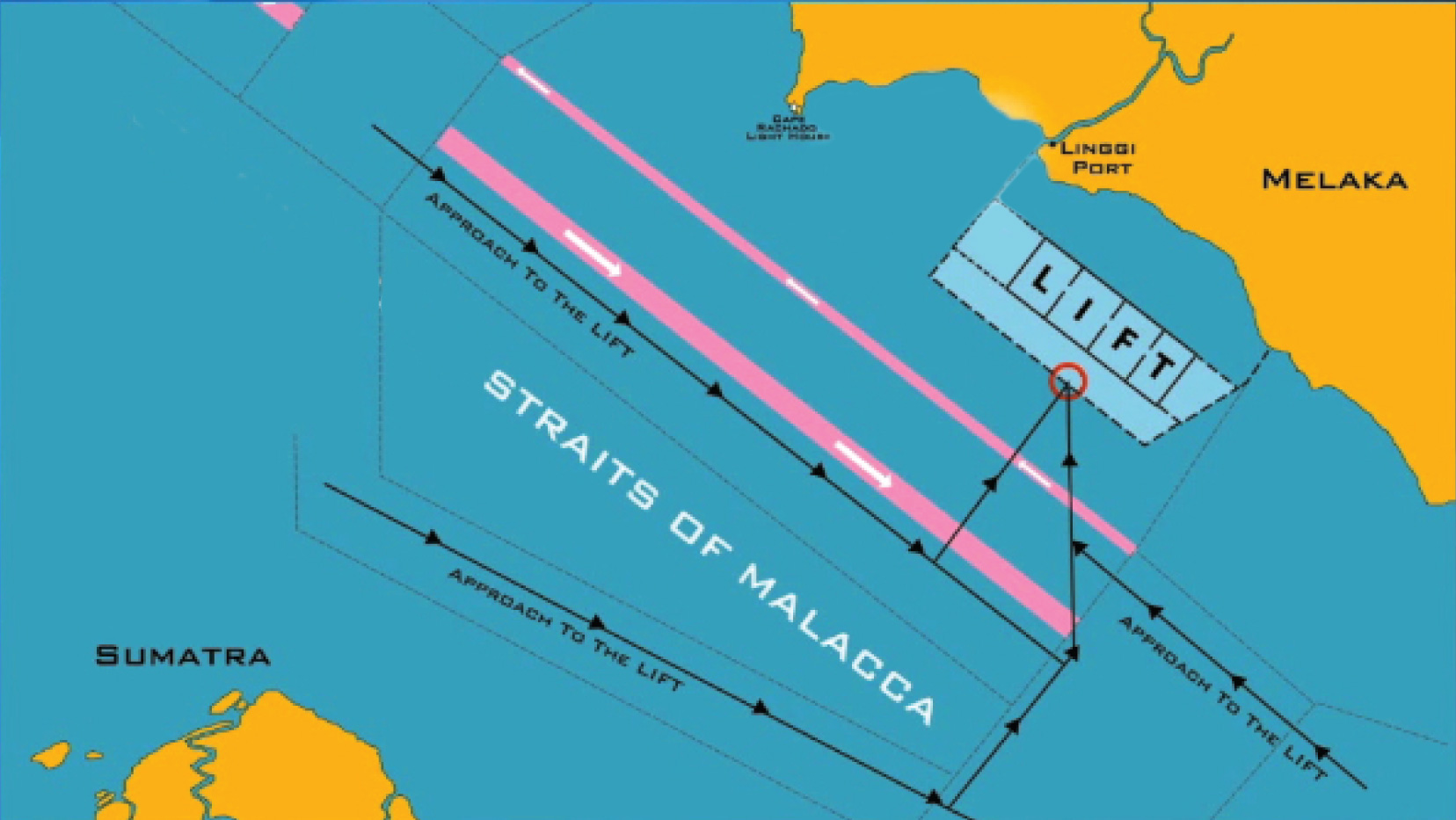
LIFT HUB map

The Port of Kuala Sungai Linggi (Malay: Pelabuhan Kuala Sungai Linggi), or Sungai Linggi commercially known as Linggi International Floating Transshipment and Trading Hub (LIFT-HUB), is a transshipment area for liquid bulk transshipments and break-bulking from western regions such as the Middle East to eastern regions or Australia located offshore of the Linggi River in the Malacca Strait. It is among the largest designated ship-to-ship cargo transfer area in Malaysia. Gazetted in 2006, Port of Sungai Linggi covers an area of 154 km² (45 sq mi) and has catered over 1000 tankers including ULCC and VLCC's since its beginning. The name "Kuala Linggi" was named after the name of the nearby river, Linggi River. Linggi means 'stem' in Buginese and refers to the strongest vertical plate at the bow of a ship.

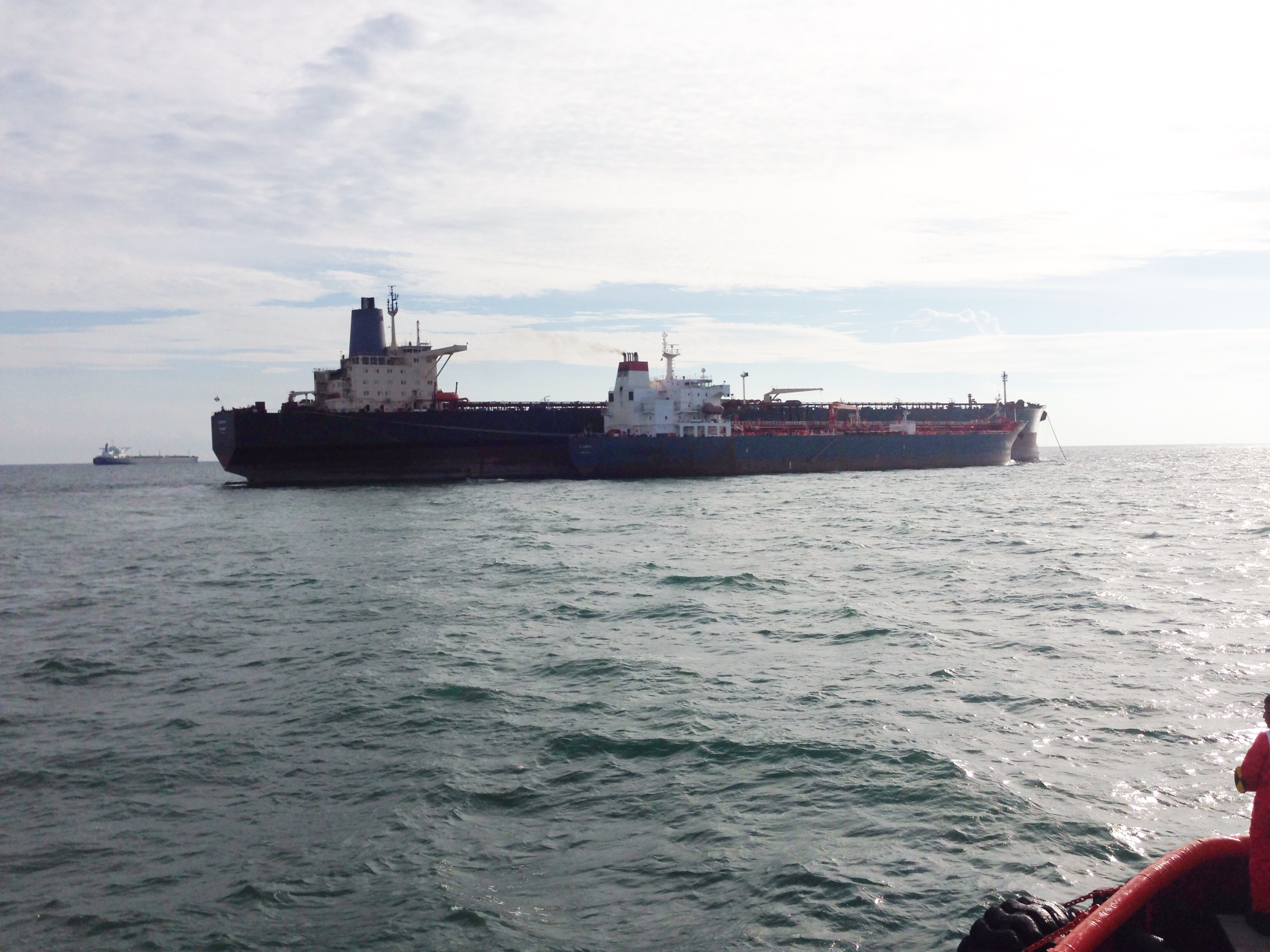
On going Ship to Ship operation at Linggi Port

== Location ==
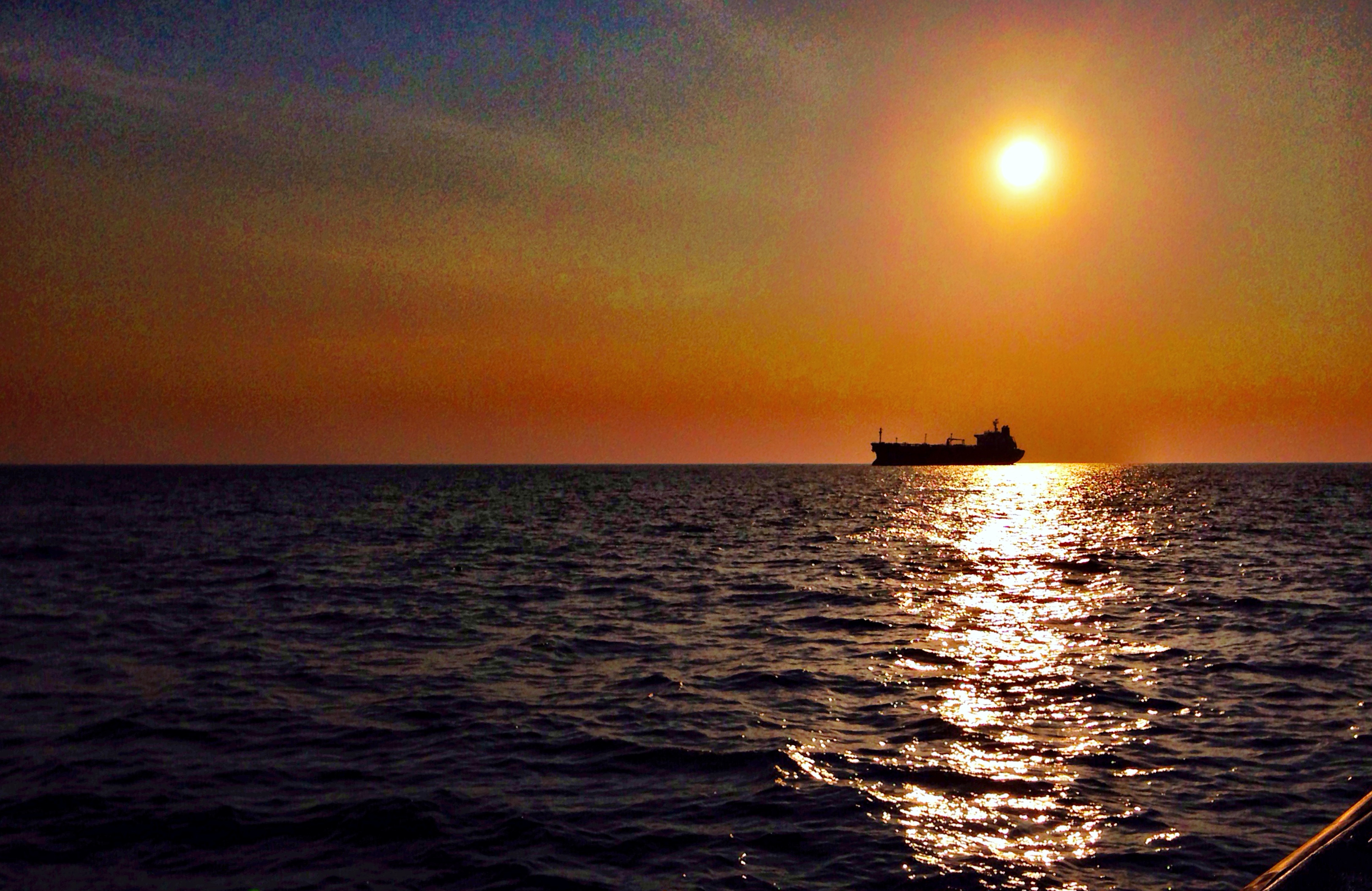
Dusk at Linggi

As the name suggests, the Port of Sungai Linggi is located at the estuary of the Linggi River that defines the border between the states of Negeri Sembilan and Malacca and accessible via air from the nearest international airport, KLIA (1 hour) and by road from Singapore (5 hours). LIFT-HUB is located approximately 20 n.m. SE of Port Dickson and 2.0 n.m. NW of Sungai Udang port (Lat. 02° 23′ 19.66" N, Long. 101° 58′ 34.90" E) on the Malacca coast, west coast of Malaysia and accessible via Strait of Malacca.

== Characteristics ==
- Seaport area covers about 45 sq NM
- Depth at designated transfer area ranging from 25–30 m
- Good holding ground, with tidal stream less than 2.5 knots.
- Max. draft for approaching 22m with under keel clearance of 3.5 m

== Port limits ==
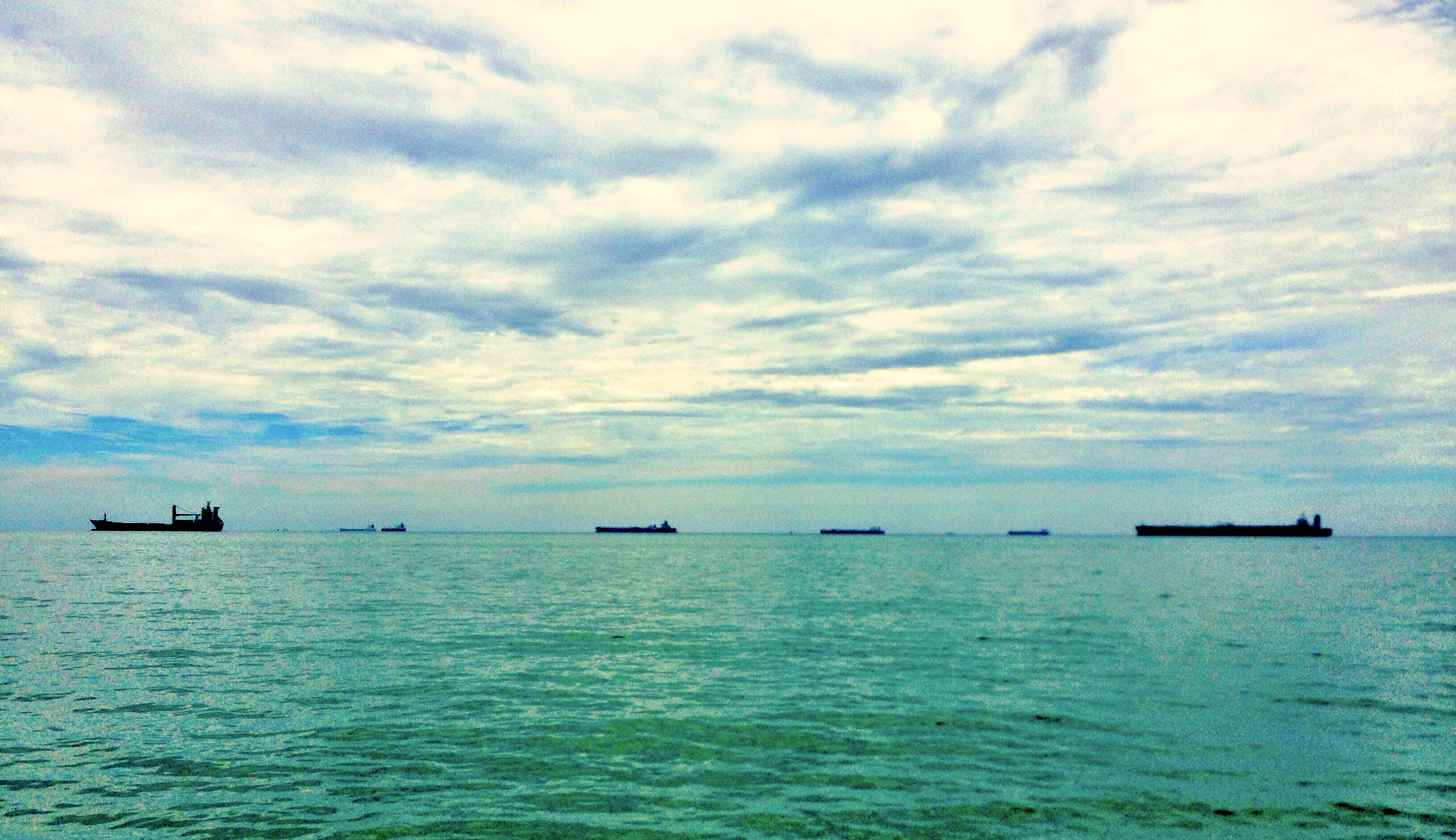
Various floaters lined up in Linggi for ship to ship operation

Sungai Linggi port limits area is 9 nm by 5 nm bounded by the following co-ordinates:

- 02°23.30′N 101°58.20′E
- 02°17.40′N 102°05.00′E
- 02°16.50′N 102°04.30′E
- 02°14.70′N 102°01.30′E
- 02°19.40′N 101°55.20′E
- 02°23.54′N 101°58.20′E
- 02°23.80′N 101°58.90′E
- 02°23.75′N 101°58.99′E

== Charts ==
For charts reference please see:

- MAL Chart No. 532
- BA Charts No. 1141
- BA Charts No. 3946
- BA Malacca Strait Pilot, NP 44
