= Tanjung Bidara =

Beach in Malacca, Malaysia

Tanjung Bidara Beach Pantai Tanjung Bidara (Malay)
- beach
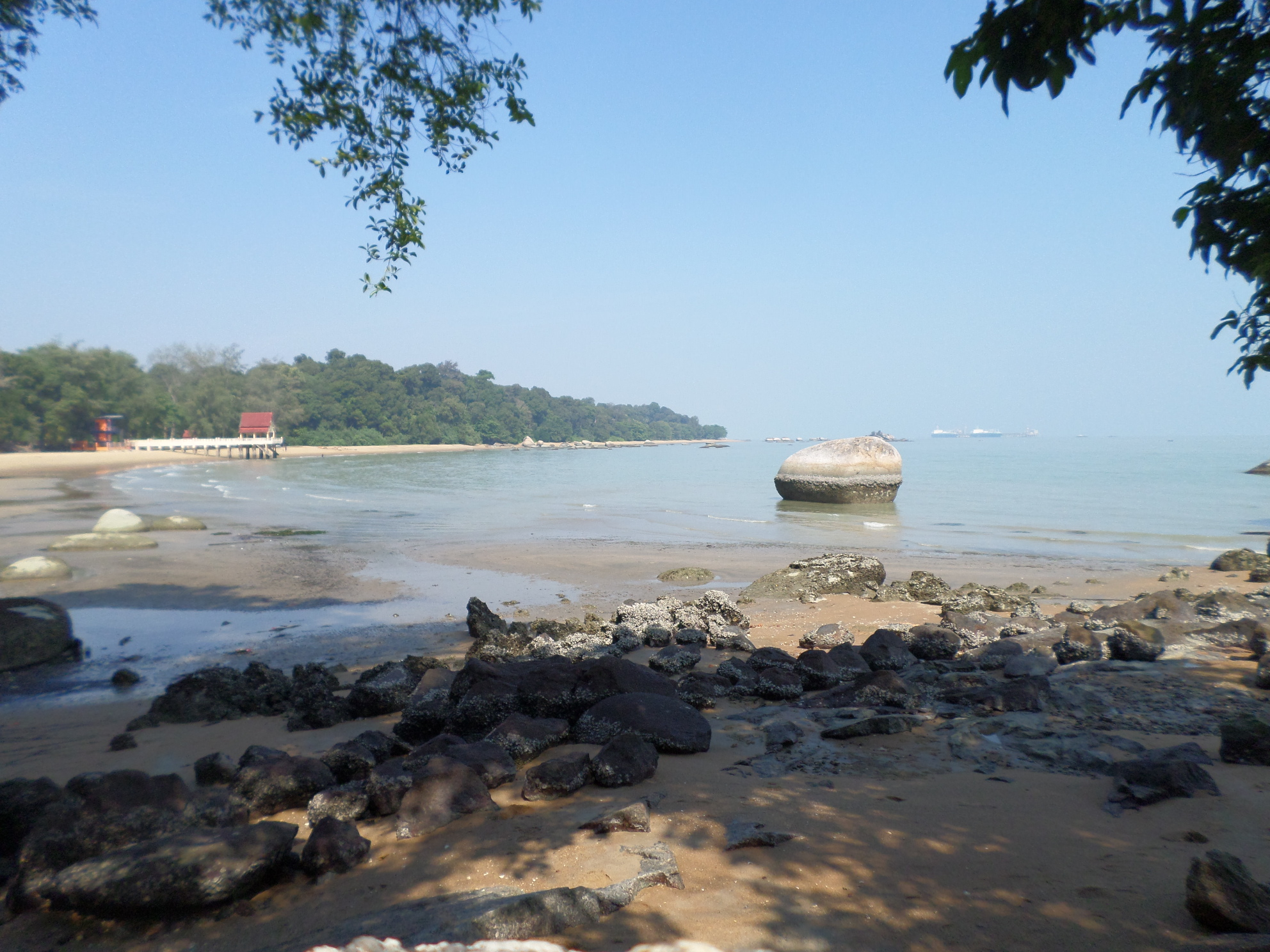

- Location within Malacca
- Coordinates: 2°17′29″N 102°5′18.05″E
- Location: Masjid Tanah, Alor Gajah District, Malacca, Malaysia

Tanjung Bidara is a beach in the town of Masjid Tanah, south of Pengkalan Balak Beach in Alor Gajah District, in the Malaysian state of Malacca. It is one of the important landing sites of the hawksbill turtles in the state. There are several accommodations within the beach area with Laguna Bidara Beach Resort being the main one.
