= Kuala Linggi =

Kuala Linggi (N01)
Malacca constituency

State constituency
- Legislature: Malacca State Legislative Assembly
MLA
Rosli Abdullah
BN
- Constituency created: 1984
- First contested: 1986
- Last contested: 2026

Demographics
- Electors (2026): 15,483

N01 Kuala Linggi within Malacca, as used for the 2021 state election

Kuala Linggi is a state constituency in Malacca, Malaysia, that has been represented in the Malacca State Legislative Assembly. The state constituency was first contested in 1986 and is mandated to return a single Assemblyman to the Malacca State Legislative Assembly under the first-past-the-post voting system. Since 2021, the State Assemblyman for Kuala Linggi is Rosli Abdullah from United Malays National Organisation (UMNO) which is part of the state's ruling coalition, Barisan Nasional (BN).

== Definition ==
The Kuala Linggi constituency contains the polling districts of Tanjung Dahan, Sungai Baru Hilir, Kampung Tengah, Permatang, Kuala Sungai Baru, Paya Mengkuang and Telok Gong.

== Demographics ==
Ethnic breakdown of Kuala Linggi's electorate as of 2026
1. Malays (72.3%)
2. Chinese (20.1%)
3. Other Ethnicities (6.10%)
4. Indians (1.40%)

== History ==
=== Polling districts ===
According to the gazette issued on 5 November 2026, the Kuala Linggi constituency has a total of 7 polling districts.

State constituency	Polling districts	Code	Location
Kuala Linggi（N01）	Tanjung Dahan	134/01/01	SK Kuala Linggi
Kuala Linggi（N01）	Sungai Baru Hilir	134/01/02	SK Ayer Jernih
Kuala Linggi（N01）	Kampung Tengah	134/01/03	SK Kampung Tengah
Kuala Linggi（N01）	Permatang	134/01/04	SK Othman Shawal
Kuala Linggi（N01）	Kuala Sungai Baru	134/01/05	SJK (C) Yok Sin
Kuala Linggi（N01）	Paya Mengkuang	134/01/06	SK Sungai Tuang
Kuala Linggi（N01）	Telok Gong	134/01/07	SMK Rahmat

=== Representation history ===
Members of the Legislative Assembly for Kuala Linggi
Assembly	No	Years	Member	Party
Constituency created from Sungei Bahru and Masjid Tanah
7th	N01	1986 – 1990	Bahari Hasan	BN (UMNO)
8th	N01	1990 – 1995	Ibrahim Durum	BN (UMNO)
9th	N01	1995 – 1999	Ibrahim Durum	BN (UMNO)
10th	N01	1999 – 2004	Ibrahim Durum	BN (UMNO)
11th	N01	2004 – 2008	Abdul Rahman Palit	BN (UMNO)
12th	N01	2008 – 2013	Ismail Othman	BN (UMNO)
13th	N01	2013 – 2018	Ismail Othman	BN (UMNO)
14th	N01	2018 – 2021	Ismail Othman	BN (UMNO)
15th	N01	2021 – 2026	Rosli Abdullah	BN (UMNO)
16th	N01	2026 – present	Rosli Abdullah	BN (UMNO)

== Election results ==
Malacca state election, 2026: Kuala Linggi
Party	Candidate	Votes	%	∆%
BN	Rosli Abdullah	7,760	70.06	▲18.99
PH	Muhammad Mukhlisul Mubin Julasapiyah	2,877	25.98	▲1.28
BERSAMA	Nur Farhana Hamzah	439	3.96	▲3.96
Total valid votes		11,076		
Total rejected ballots		86		
Unreturned ballots		5		
Turnout		11,167	72.12	▲6.78
Registered electors		15,483		
Majority		4,883	44.08	▲17.71
BN hold		Swing		
Source(s) https://electiondata.my/elections/mlk/SE-16/

Malacca state election, 2021: Kuala Linggi
Party	Candidate	Votes	%	∆%
BN	Rosli Abdullah	3,554	51.07	▼1.27
PH	Julasapiah Kasim	1,718	24.70	▼12.72
PN	Aziah Mohd Sa'ad	1,645	23.64	▲23.64
Independent	Kamisan Palil	51	0.73	▲0.73
Total valid votes		6,968		
Total rejected ballots		162		
Unreturned ballots		10		
Turnout		7,140	65.34	▼26.37
Registered electors		10,928		
Majority		1,836	26.37	▲11.45
BN hold		Swing		
Source(s) https://lom.agc.gov.my/ilims/upload/portal/akta/outputp/1715764/PUB%20583.pdf

Malacca state election, 2018: Kuala Linggi
Party	Candidate	Votes	%	∆%
BN	Ismail Othman	4,812	52.34	▼11.78
PKR	Hasmorni Tamby	3,440	37.42	▲37.42
PAS	Azmi Sambul	941	10.24	▼25.64
Total valid votes		9,193	100.00	
Total rejected ballots		126		
Unreturned ballots		18		
Turnout		9,337	84.54	▼2.59
Registered electors		11,045		
Majority		1,372	14.92	▼13.32
BN hold		Swing		

Malacca state election, 2013: Kuala Linggi
Party	Candidate	Votes	%	∆%
BN	Ismail Othman	5,521	64.12	▼0.08
PAS	Julasapiyah Kassim	3,090	35.88	▲0.08
Total valid votes		8,611	100.00	
Total rejected ballots		131		
Unreturned ballots		0		
Turnout		8,742	87.13	▲7.69
Registered electors		10,033		
Majority		2,431	28.24	▼0.16
BN hold		Swing		
Source(s) "Federal Government Gazette - Notice of Contested Election, State Legislative Assembly for the State of Selangor [P.U. (B) 192/2013]" (PDF). Attorney General's Chambers of Malaysia. 26 April 2013. Archived from the original (PDF) on 2019-12-29. "Federal Government Gazette - Results of Contested Election and Statements of the Poll after the Official Addition of Votes, State Constituencies for the State of Selangor [P.U. (B) 233/2013]" (PDF). Attorney General's Chambers of Malaysia. 22 May 2013. Archived from the original (PDF) on 2018-10-02.

Malacca state election, 2008: Kuala Linggi
Party	Candidate	Votes	%	∆%
BN	Ismail Othman	4,468	64.20	▼15.86
PAS	Julasapiyah Kassim	2,491	35.80	▲15.86
Total valid votes		6,959	100.00	
Total rejected ballots		137		
Unreturned ballots		9		
Turnout		7,105	79.44	▼0.31
Registered electors		8,933		
Majority		1,977	28.40	▼31.72
BN hold		Swing		

Malacca state election, 2004: Kuala Linggi
Party	Candidate	Votes	%	∆%
BN	Ismail Othman	5,364	80.06	▲11.47
PAS	Julasapiyah Kassim	1,336	19.94	▼11.47
Total valid votes		6,700	100.00	
Total rejected ballots		127		
Unreturned ballots		3		
Turnout		6,830	79.78	▲0.71
Registered electors		8,561		
Majority		4,028	60.12	▲22.95
BN hold		Swing		

Malacca state election, 1999: Kuala Linggi
Party	Candidate	Votes	%	∆%
BN	Ibrahim Durum	4,478	68.59	▼16.49
PAS	Julasapiyah Kassim	2,051	31.41	▲21.11
Total valid votes		6,529	100.00	
Total rejected ballots		209		
Unreturned ballots		11		
Turnout		6,749	79.07	▲1.27
Registered electors		8,535		
Majority		2,427	37.17	▼37.61
BN hold		Swing		

Malacca state election, 1995: Kuala Linggi
Party	Candidate	Votes	%	∆%
BN	Ibrahim Durum	5,269	85.08	▲1.38
PAS	Md. Ali Bagus	638	10.30	▲10.30
S46	Ishak Atan	286	4.62	▼11.68
Total valid votes		6,193	100.00	
Total rejected ballots		126		
Unreturned ballots		6		
Turnout		6,325	77.81	▼0.37
Registered electors		8,129		
Majority		4,631	74.78	▲7.37
BN hold		Swing		

Malacca state election, 1990: Kuala Linggi
Party	Candidate	Votes	%	∆%
BN	Ibrahim Durum	5,599	83.70	▼4.02
S46	Ishak Atan	1,090	16.30	▲16.30
Total valid votes		6,689	100.00	
Total rejected ballots		193		
Unreturned ballots		8		
Turnout		6,890	78.18	▲4.81
Registered electors		8,813		
Majority		4,509	67.41	▼8.05
BN hold		Swing		

Malacca state by-election, 1990: Kuala Linggi Upon the death of the incumbent, Bahari Hasan
Party	Candidate	Votes	%	∆%
BN	Ibrahim Durum	5,447	87.73	▲21.23
Independent	Abdul Ghani Long	762	12.27	▼7.83
Total valid votes		6,209	100.00	
Total rejected ballots		145		
Unreturned ballots		176		
Turnout		6,530	73.37	▲1.09
Registered electors		8,900		
Majority		4,685	75.45	▲29.06
BN hold		Swing		

Malacca state election, 1986: Kuala Linggi
Party	Candidate	Votes	%
BN	Bahari Hasan	3,841	66.50
Independent	Md. Ali Bagus	1,161	20.10
PAS	Ab. Rahman Hasan	774	13.40
Total valid votes		5,776	100.00
Total rejected ballots		269	
Unreturned ballots		0	
Turnout		6,045	72.28
Registered electors		8,363	
Majority		2,680	46.40
This was a new constituency created.
