= Ayer Keroh Highway =

Road in Malaysia

Federal Route 143
- Lebuh Ayer Keroh 爱极乐快速公路 (Ayer Keroh Avenue)
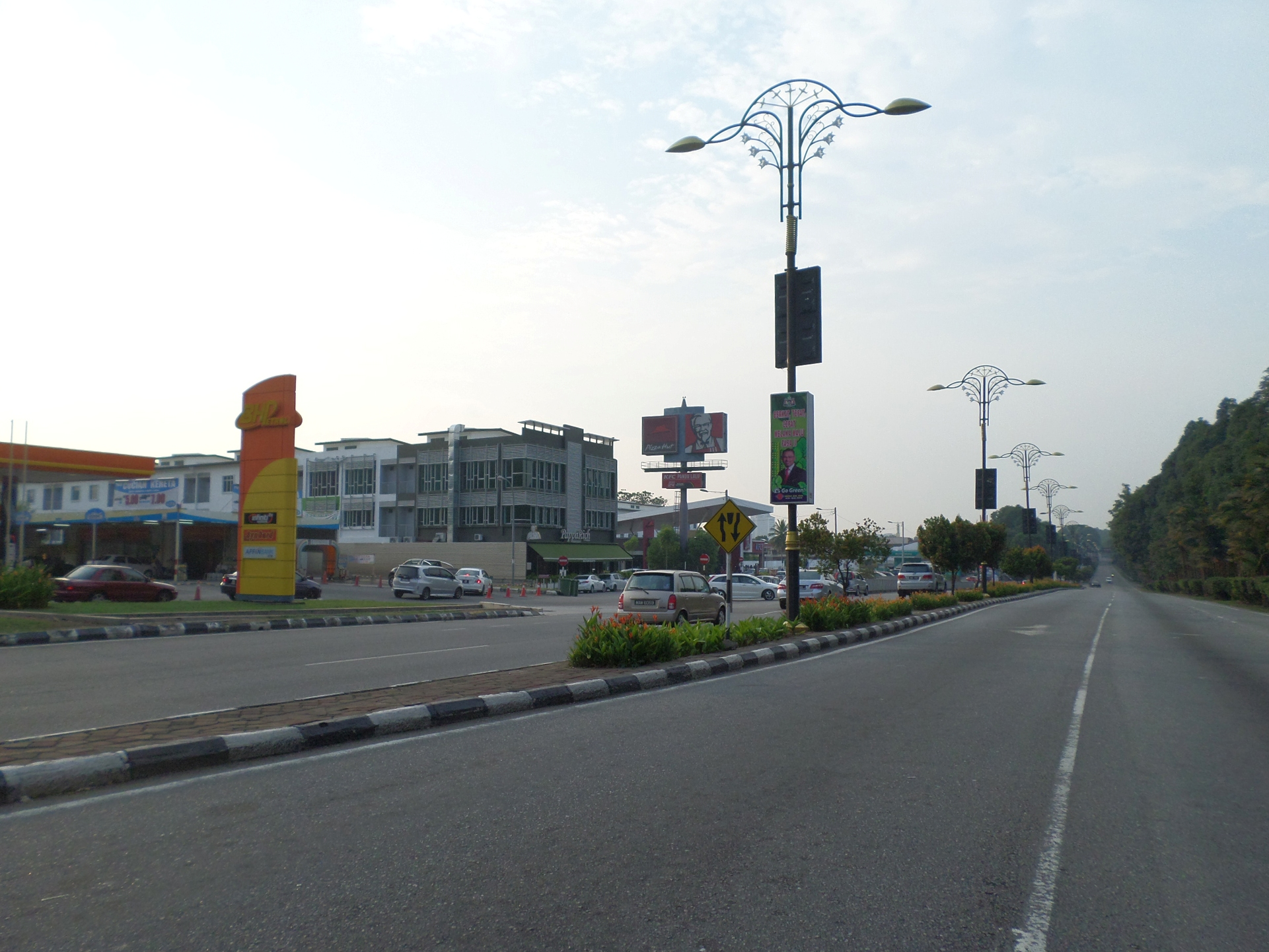

Route information
- Maintained by Malaysian Public Works Department
- Length: 11.80 km (7.33 mi)
- Existed: 1993–present
- History: Completed in 1997

Major junctions
- North end: Ayer Keroh Interchange; North–South Expressway Southern Route / AH2
- North–South Expressway Southern Route / AH2; M29 State Route M29; FT 33 SPA Highway; FT 264 Federal Route 264; M126 State Route M126; M144 State Route M144; FT 142 Federal Route 142
- South end: Batu Berendam; Tun Abdul Ghafar Intersections

Location
- Country: Malaysia
- Primary destinations: Malacca City, Ayer Keroh, Hang Tuah Jaya, Durian Tunggal

Highway system
- Highways in Malaysia; Expressways; Federal; State

Ayer Keroh Highway, Federal Route 143, also known as Lebuh Ayer Keroh or Ayer Keroh Avenue and officially named Jalan Tun Abdul Razak or Tun Abdul Razak Road, is the main dual carriageway highway that connects Malacca City of Malacca, Malaysia to the North–South Expressway via Ayer Keroh Interchange. Ayer Keroh, the main satellite town of Malacca City is located along the road. Lebuh Ayer Keroh used to be State Route M31 before being recommissioned by Malaysian Public Works Department. Before 1993, most of the road was a two-lane road before it was upgraded to a dual-carriageway in 1993 (Ayer Keroh Toll Plaza–Graha Makmur) and in 1997 (entire route).

== Route Background ==
The Kilometre Zero of the Federal Route 143 starts at Jalan Durian Tunggal junctions near Ayer Keroh toll plaza of the Ayer Keroh Interchange.

== History ==
=== Hang Tuah Jaya Junctions ===
The flyover from Ayer Keroh Old Road Junctions to Hang Tuah Jaya Junctions provide smoother access bypassing Hang Tuah Jaya Junctions. In the same time, Ayer Keroh Old Road Junctions is changed to full access.

=== Tun Abdul Ghafar Intersections ===
The direct access flyover from FT142 Malacca City to Ayer Keroh Highway is built to reduce traffic congestion in Tun Abdul Ghafar Intersections. In the same time, the Tun Abdul Ghafar Intersections are rebuilt.

== Features ==
- Ayer Keroh Gateway Arch
- Ayer Keroh
- Hang Tuah Jaya
- Mamee-Double Decker factory

=== Alternative routes ===
- Malaysia Federal Route 264

At most sections, the Federal Route 143 was built under the JKR R5 road standard, with a speed limit of 90 km/h (56 mph).

== Junction and interchange lists ==
The entire route is located in Malacca.

Legend:

- I/C - Interchange, I/S - Intersection, RSA - Rest and service area, OBR - Overhead bridge restaurant, R/R - Restaurant and rest plaza, L/B - Layby, V/P - Vista point, TN - tunnel, T/P - Toll plaza, BR - Bridge
- C - Cloverleaf, S - Stack, T-A - Trumpet-A, T-B - Trumpet-B, DT - Directional-T/Y, SDT - Semi-Directional-T/Y, P-Y - Partial-Y, D - Diamond, P-C - Partial cloverleaf, D-D - Diverging diamond, D-R - Direct ramp

| District | Location | km | mi | Exit | Name | Destinations | Notes |
|---|---|---|---|---|---|---|---|
| Alor Gajah | MPHTJ | | | 231 | Ayer Keroh-NSE I/C | North–South Expressway Southern Route / AH2 – Kuala Lumpur, Seremban, Alor Gajah, Jasin, Johor Bahru, Singapore | Trumpet interchange |
| Alor Gajah | MPHTJ | | | Ayer Keroh Toll Plaza | | | |
| Alor Gajah | MPHTJ | | | | Melaka Butterfly and Reptile Sanctuary | Melaka Butterfly and Reptile Sanctuary – | Southbound |
| Alor Gajah | MPHTJ | 11.8 | 7.3 | 14301 | Jalan Durian Tunggal I/S | M29 Jalan Durian Tunggal – Durian Tunggal | T-junctions, from Malacca only |
| Alor Gajah | MPHTJ | | | 14302 | SPA Highway I/C | FT 33 SPA Highway – Paya Rumput, Alor Gajah, Sungai Udang, Universiti Teknikal Malaysia Melaka (UTeM) | Cloverleaf interchange |
| Alor Gajah | MPHTJ | | | Petronas L/B (southbound) | | | |
| Alor Gajah | MPHTJ | | | Gateway Arch RSA – Tourist Information Centre (southbound) | | | |
| Alor Gajah-Melaka Tengah District border | MPHTJ | | | Ayer Keroh Gateway Arch | | | |
| Melaka Tengah | MPHTJ | | | Gateway Arch RSA – Tourist Information Centre (northbound) | | | |
| Melaka Tengah | MPHTJ | | | | Malaysia Heritage Studios | Malaysia Heritage Studios – Mini Malaysia, Mini Malaysia Park, Mini ASEAN Park, Ayer Keroh Country Resort | Southbound |
| Melaka Tengah | MPHTJ | | | | Ayer Keroh forest reserve | | Northbound |
| Melaka Tengah | MPHTJ | | | | Malacca Zoo | Malacca Zoo – | Southbound |
| Melaka Tengah | MPHTJ | | | | Melaka Crocodile Farm | Melaka Crocodile Farm, McDonald's drive-thru | Northbound |
| Melaka Tengah | MPHTJ | | | | Dataran Sejarah | Dataran Sejarah – Tourist Information Centre | |
| Melaka Tengah | MPHTJ | | | 14303 | Jalan Tasik I/S | Jalan Tasik – Ayer Keroh Golf and Country Resort | LILO |
| Melaka Tengah | MPHTJ | | | 14304 | Hang Tuah Jaya; Hang Tuah Jaya I/S | Persiaran Ayer Keroh – Hang Tuah Jaya, Melaka International Trade Centre (MITC), Melaka Planetarium, Al-Alami Mosque; FT 264 Malaysia Federal Route 264 – Gapam, Bemban, Jasin, Seri Negeri complex | Diamond interchange |
| Melaka Tengah | MPHTJ | | | 14305 | Ayer Keroh; Jalan Ayer Keroh Lama I/S | M126 Malacca State Route M126 – Bukit Beruang, Batu Berendam, Malacca International Airport | T-junctions under flyover |
| Melaka Tengah | MPHTJ | | | | Ayer Keroh; Ayer Keroh Industrial Area I/S | Ayer Keroh Industrial Area, Taman Muzaffar | Junctions |
| Melaka Tengah | MPHTJ | | | | Ayer Keroh Industrial Area | | |
| Melaka Tengah | MPHTJ | | | | Mamee-Double Decker factory | | |
| Melaka Tengah | MBMB | | | 14307 | Bukit Beruang I/S | Jalan Istana – Bukit Beruang, Istana Melaka (Yang di-Pertua Negeri (Governor's) Palace), Hospital Pantai , Multimedia University (MMU) (Malacca Campus); M144 Malacca State Route M144 – Bukit Katil, Bemban, Jasin | Junctions |
| Melaka Tengah | MBMB | | | 14308 | Graha Makmur I/S | Jalan Graha Makmur – AEON Ayer Keroh, Graha Makmur (MBMB City Hall) | Junctions |
| Melaka Tengah | MBMB | | | | Melaka Mall (Plaza Kota Mas) | Melaka Mall (Plaza Kota Mas) | |
| Melaka Tengah | MBMB | | | 14309 | Jalan Bukit Beruang I/S | M29 Jalan Bukit Beruang – Bukit Beruang; Jalan Datuk Ghani Ali – Duyong, Semabok | Junctions |
| Melaka Tengah | MBMB | | | 14310 | Jalan Penghulu Abbas I/S | Jalan Penghulu Abbas – Bukit Baru, Bukit Piatu | T-junctions |
| Melaka Tengah | MBMB | | | 14311 | Bukit Sebukor I/S | Jalan Pengkalan Batu – Pengkalan Batu, Batu Berendam; Jalan Bukit Sebukor – Bukit Sebukor | Junctions |
| Melaka Tengah | MBMB | 0.0 | 0.0 | 14312 | Batu Berendam; Tun Abdul Ghafar I/S | Jalan Solok Pantai Peringgit – Gallery of the Chief Minister of Malacca, Tun Ghafar Baba Museum; FT 142 Malaysia Federal Route 142 – Batu Berendam, Malacca Airport (Batu Berendam Airport), Malacca City, Malacca General Hospital , Masjid Al Azim, Historical Places of Malacca (UNESCO World Heritage Sites) | Intersections |
1.000 mi = 1.609 km; 1.000 km = 0.621 mi: Concurrency terminus; Electronic toll collection; Incomplete access
