= Jalan Durian Tunggal–Tangkak =

Road in Malaysia

Melaka Route 2
- Jalan Durian Tunggal–Tangkak
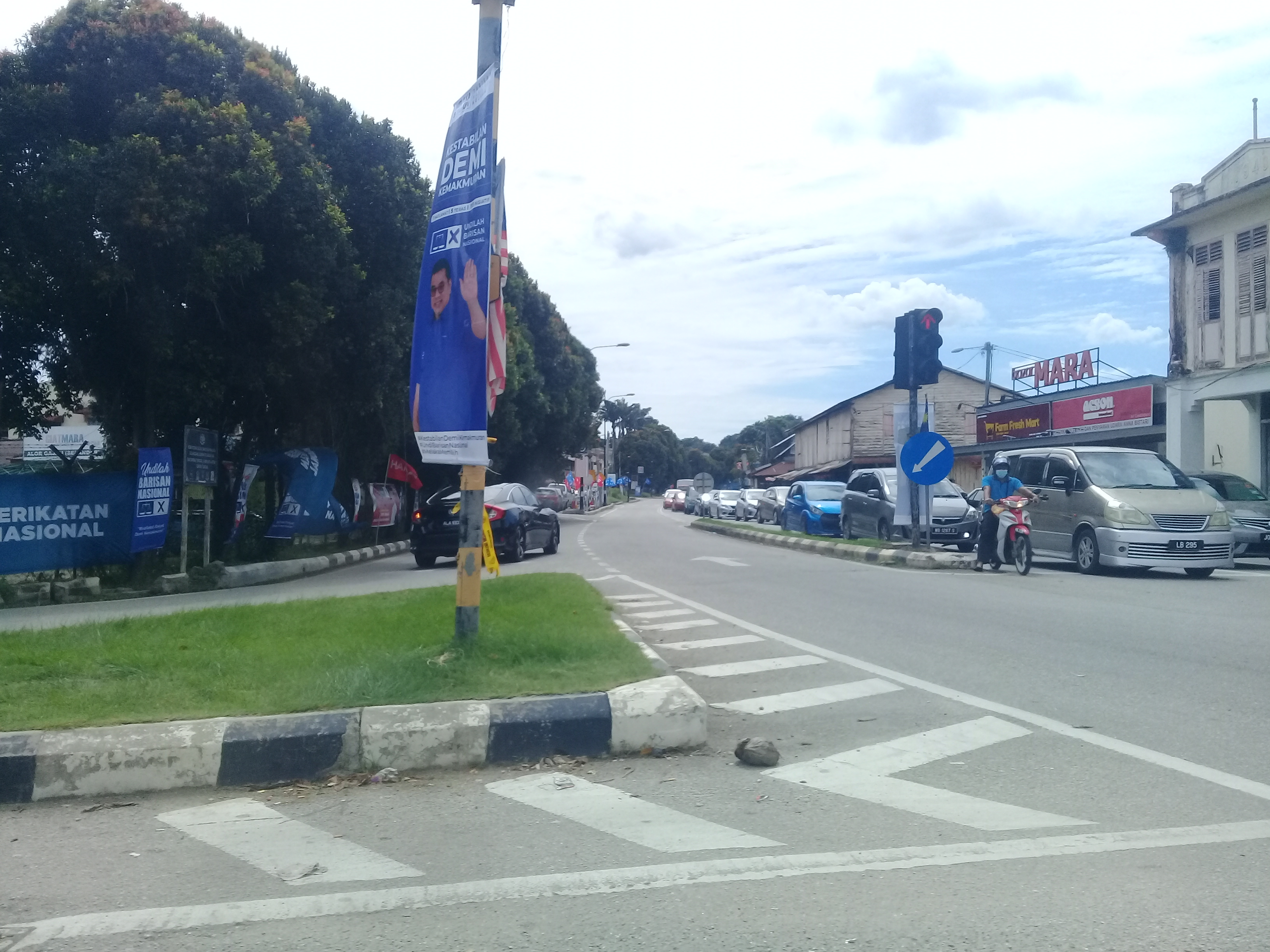
- Jalan Durian Tunggal–Tangkak M2 at Durian Tunggal

Major junctions
- Southwest end: Malacca City
- FT 19 AMJ Highway; FT 142 Federal Route 142; M126 Jalan Sungai Putat; FT 33 SPA Highway; M29 Jalan Durian Tunggal; M19 Jalan Machap; M13 Jalan Dangi–Kesang Pajak; M109 Jalan Tiang Dua; FT 144 Federal Route 144; M25 Jalan Merlimau–Jasin; M15 Jalan Nyalas
- Northeast end: Kampung Chohong

Location
- Country: Malaysia
- Primary destinations: Durian Tunggal, Ayer Keroh, Malacca Airport , Batu Berendam, Sempang Gading, Jasin, Chin-Chin

Highway system
- Highways in Malaysia; Expressways; Federal; State

Johor Route 21
- Jalan Sialang
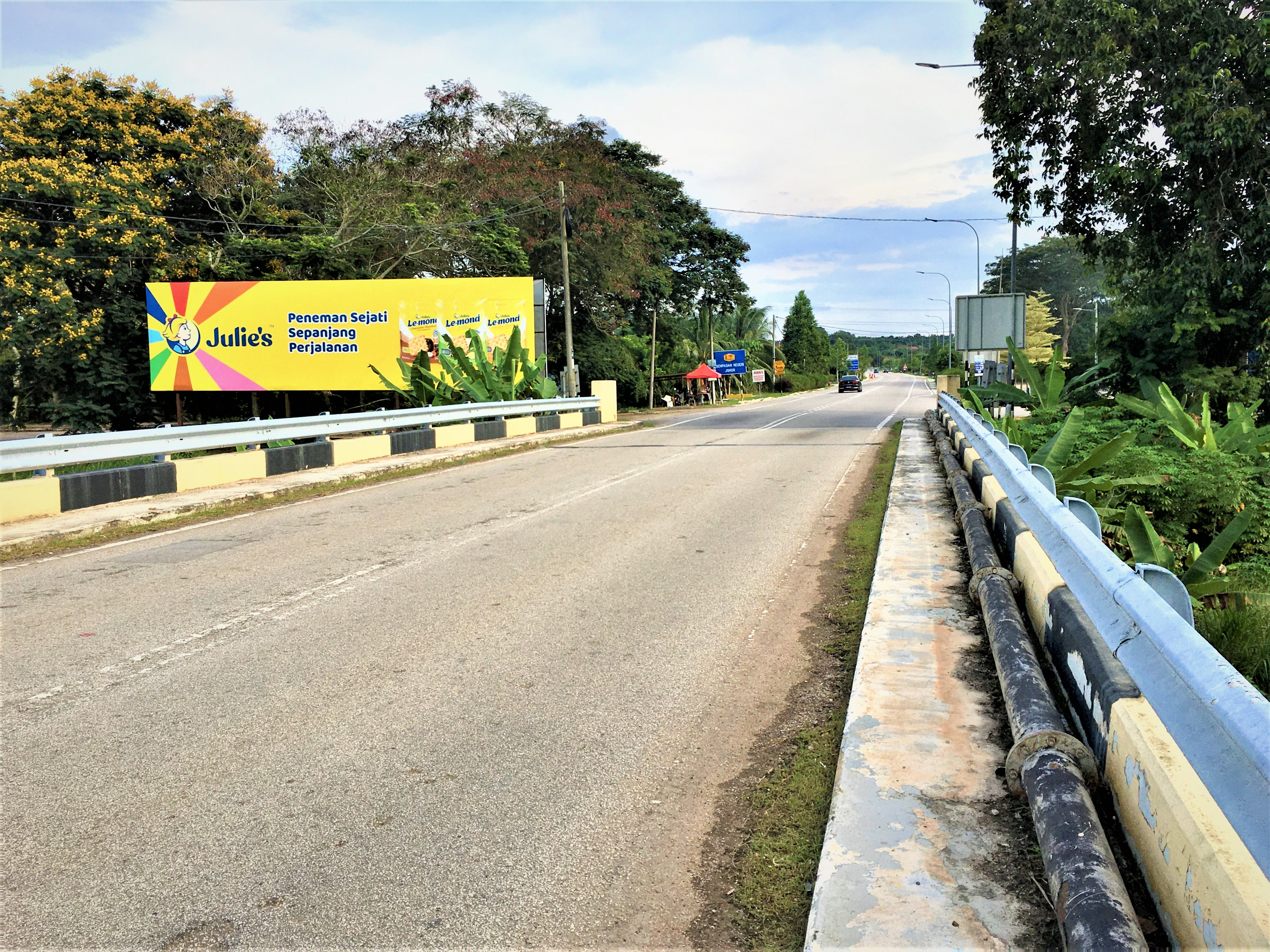
- Chohong River Bridge on the Johor–Malacca border, looking into Johor.

Major junctions
- Northwest end: Kampung Chohong, Malacca
- M15 Jalan Nyalas; J192 State Route J192; FT 23 Federal Route 23; J187 Jalan Solok
- Southeast end: Tangkak, Johor

Location
- Country: Malaysia
- Primary destinations: Kampung Sailang, Kampung Tanjung Laboh, Taman Ledang

Highway system
- Highways in Malaysia; Expressways; Federal; State

Jalan Durian Tunggal–Tangkak, also known as M2 in the Malacca side and M21/J21 Jalan Sialang in the Johor side, are the main state roads in Malacca and Johor, Malaysia. The routes were previously known as part of FT142 Malaysia Federal Route 142, before they were recommissioned back as their own state road.

== Route background ==
The Kilometre Zero of the Malacca State Route M2 starts at Batu Berendam.

== History ==
=== Durian Tunggal section reroute ===
==== Phase 1 ====
On 11 May 2025, Hang Tuah Jaya Municipal Council test the ability of changing the Taman Desa Idaman junctions to T-junctions with LILO for Durian Tunggal Commercial Centre (Pusat Perniagaan Durian Tunggal). After 14 days, on 25 May 2025, the Taman Desa Idaman junctions is changed to T-junctions with LILO permanently.

==== Phase 2 ====
The M2 sections between Jalan Durian Tunggal intersections near to Shell and Jalan Murai Jaya intersections is changed from bidirectional route to single direction route for Selandar bound, along with Jalan Murai Jaya and M29 Jalan Durian Tunggal between Jalan Murai Jaya and M2.

== Features ==
=== Notable features ===
At most section, the roads was built under the JKR R5 road standard, allowing maximum speed limit of up to 90 km/h.

- Main route to Universiti Teknikal Malaysia Melaka (UTeM)

=== Overlaps ===
- FT142 Malaysia Federal Route 142 (Jalan Bachang Intersections–Malacca Airport Roundabout)

There are no alternate routes or sections with motorcycle lanes.

== Junction lists ==
State	District	Location	km	mi	Name	Destinations	Notes
Malacca	Melaka Tengah	Malacca City			Malacca City; Jalan Tun Razak-AMJ Highway I/C	FT 19 AMJ Highway – Alor Gajah, Tampin, Umbai, Muar, Batu Pahat; Jalan Tun Perak – City Centre, Historical Places of Malacca (UNESCO World Heritage Sites)	Junctions
Malacca	Melaka Tengah	Bachang			Bachang		
Malacca	Melaka Tengah	Bachang			Jalan Tun Fatimah	M7 Jalan Tun Fatimah – Malim Jaya, Melaka Sentral, Ayer Keroh	Intersection
Malacca	Melaka Tengah	Bachang			Jalan Bachang	FT 142 Malaysia Federal Route 142 – Malacca, Ayer Keroh; M128 Jalan Mohd Zin – Cheng	Intersection
Malacca	Melaka Tengah	Batu Berendam			Jalan Sungai Putat	M126 Malacca State Route M126 – Bukit Beruang, Ayer Keroh; North–South Expressway Southern Route / AH2 – Kuala Lumpur, Johor Bahru	T-junctions
Malacca	Melaka Tengah	Batu Berendam			Malacca Airport (Batu Berendam Airport)	Malacca Airport (Batu Berendam Airport) – Main Terminal, Arrival/Departures	Roundabout
Malacca	Alor Gajah	Cheng			Taman Merdeka	Taman Merdeka	Roundabout
Malacca	Alor Gajah	Cheng			Cheng	FT 33 SPA Highway – Sungai Udang, Masjid Tanah, Alor Gajah, Ayer Keroh; North–South Expressway Southern Route / AH2 – Kuala Lumpur, Johor Bahru	Interchange
Malacca	Alor Gajah	Cheng			Kuala Gangsa-WCE	West Coast Expressway	Under Planning
Malacca	Alor Gajah	Cheng			Kampung Gangsa		
Malacca	Alor Gajah	Durian Tunggal			Durian Tunggal; Taman Desa Idaman	Jalan Desa Idaman – Taman Desa Idaman; Durian Tunggal Commercial Centre (LILO)	T-junctions and LILO
Malacca	Alor Gajah	Durian Tunggal			Durian Tunggal	M29 Jalan Durian Tunggal – Ayer Keroh; North–South Expressway Southern Route / AH2 – Kuala Lumpur, Johor Bahru	Entrance from M29 only
Malacca	Alor Gajah	Durian Tunggal			Durian Tunggal	M130 Jalan Belimbing Dalam – Belimbing, Belimbing Dalam	LILO
Malacca	Alor Gajah	Durian Tunggal			Durian Tunggal; Jalan Alor Gajah Lama	M17 Jalan Alor Gajah Lama – Alor Gajah, Melaka Pindah; Jalan Murai Jaya – Taman Murai Jaya, Ayer Keroh	Intersections
Malacca	Alor Gajah	Durian Tunggal			Durian Tunggal Recreational Lake	Durian Tunggal Recreational Lake	
Malacca	Alor Gajah	Durian Tunggal			Sempang Gading	M19 Jalan Machap – Machap, Selandar, Simpang Kuala Sungga, Gemencheh	T-junctions
Malacca	Alor Gajah	Durian Tunggal			Universiti Teknikal Malaysia Melaka (UTeM)	Universiti Teknikal Malaysia Melaka (UTeM)	T-junctions; Max. weights: 5 tans with UTeM permissions
Malacca	Jasin	Kesang Pajak			Kesang Pajak	M13 Jalan Dangi–Kesang Pajak – Batang Melaka, Selandar	T-junctions
Malacca	Jasin	Kesang Tua			Kesang Tua		
Malacca	Jasin	Kesang Tua			Kampung Kesang	M109 Malacca State Route M109 – Bemban, Tiang Dua, Serkam	T-junctions
Malacca	Jasin	Kesang Tua			Kampung Ayer Perah	M129 Jalan Ayer Perah – Jalan Taman Maju, Selandar	Junctions
Malacca	Jasin	Jasin			Jasin	FT 144 Malaysia Federal Route 144 – Kampung Chabau, Nyalas, Bemban, Kandang	Roundabout
Malacca	Jasin	Jasin			Kerayong I/S	M25 Malacca State Route M25 – Merlimau, Muar; North–South Expressway Southern Route / AH2 – Kuala Lumpur, Johor Bahru	Roundabout
Malacca	Jasin	Chin-Chin			Kampung Mentibong		
Malacca	Jasin	Chin-Chin			Kampung Terentang		
Malacca	Jasin	Chin-Chin			Chin-Chin	M15 Jalan Nyalas – Nyalas, Simpang Bekoh, Asahan, Jementah	T-junctions
Malacca–Johor border					Kesang River bridge		
Johor	Tangkak	Sialang			Kesang Border recreational area		
Johor	Tangkak	Sialang			Kampung Sialang		
Johor	Tangkak	Sialang			Kampung Tanjung Laboh		
Johor	Tangkak	Tangkak			Taman Ledang	J192 Johor State Route J192 – Muar, Malacca, Batu Pahat, Sungai Mati, Bukit Gambir	T-junctions
Johor	Tangkak	Tangkak			Tangkak	FT 23 Malaysia Federal Route 23 – Segamat, Jementah, Gunung Ledang, Sungai Mati, Muar; J187 Jalan Solok – Solok, Bukit Gambir; North–South Expressway Southern Route / AH2 – Kuala Lumpur, Johor Bahru	Junctions
1.000 mi = 1.609 km; 1.000 km = 0.621 mi: Concurrency terminus; Proposed; Incomplete access
