= SPA Highway =

Road in Malaysia

Federal Route 33
- Sungai Udang–Paya Rumput–Ayer Keroh Highway

Route information
- Maintained by Malaysian Public Works Department
- Length: 23.1 km (14.4 mi)
- Existed: 2002–present
- History: Completed in 2005

Major junctions
- West end: Sungai Udang
- FT 5 Federal Route 5 FT 19 AMJ Highway; M2 State Route M2; FT 143 Ayer Keroh Highway
- East end: Ayer Keroh

Location
- Country: Malaysia
- Primary destinations: Tanjong Minyak, Bukit Rambai, Bertam Ulu, Paya Rumput, Alor Gajah, Krubong, Cheng, Batu Berendam, Durian Tunggal, Simpang Gading

Highway system
- Highways in Malaysia; Expressways; Federal; State

Lebuh SPA (Sungai Udang–Paya Rumput–Ayer Keroh Highway), Federal Route 33 (formerly Malacca State Route M17), is a major highway in Malacca state, Malaysia. This 23.1 km (14.4 mi) highway connects Sungai Udang in the west to Ayer Keroh in the east.

== Route background ==
The Kilometre Zero of the Federal Route 33 starts from Sungai Udang.

== History ==
Construction began in 2002 and was completed in 2005. In 2010, the highway was gazetted as the federal roads by JKR as Federal Route 33.

== Features ==
- This highway features fast lane-to-slow lane U-turns.
- Two-lane carriageway
- Hang Jebat Stadium

At most sections, the SPA Highway was built under the JKR R5 road standard as a dual-carriageway highway with partial access control, with a speed limit of 90 km/h (56 mph).

There are no overlaps, alternate routes, or sections with motorcycle lanes.

== Interchange lists ==
The entire route is located in Malacca.

Legend:

- I/C - Interchange, I/S - Intersection, RSA - Rest and service area, OBR - Overhead bridge restaurant, R/R - Restaurant and rest plaza, L/B - Layby, V/P - Vista point, TN - tunnel, T/P - Toll plaza, BR - Bridge
- C - Cloverleaf, S - Stack, T-A - Trumpet-A, T-B - Trumpet-B, DT - Directional-T/Y, SDT - Semi-Directional-T/Y, P-Y - Partial-Y, D - Diamond, P-C - Partial cloverleaf, D-D - Diverging diamond, D-R - Direct ramp

District	Km	Exit	Name	Destinations	Notes
Alor Gajah	0.0	3301	Sungai Udang; Sungai Udang I/S	FT 5 Malaysia Federal Route 5 – Port Dickson, Masjid Tanah, Kuala Sungai Baru, Tanjung Bidara, Sungai Udang, Tangga Batu, Tanjung Kling, Malacca City, Muar	T-junctions
Central Malacca			Sungai Udang Prison Complex		
Central Malacca		BR	Viaduct		
Central Malacca		3302	Jalan Bukit Rambai I/S	M9 Jalan Bukit Rambai – Bukit Rambai	T-junctions
Central Malacca		3303	Paya Rumput; Paya Rumput I/C	FT 19 AMJ Highway – Paya Rumput, Alor Gajah, Malacca City, Muar, Batu Pahat	Diamond interchange
Central Malacca		3304	Hang Jebat Sports Complex I/S	Hang Jebat Sports Complex	T-junctions
Central Malacca		3305	Padang Siapong I/S	Kampung Padang Siapong	Junctions
Central Malacca-Alor Gajah district border		BR	Malacca River Bridge		
Alor Gajah		3306	Gangsa I/C	M2 Jalan Durian Tunggal–Tangkak – Durian Tunggal, Jasin, Chin Chin, Batu Berendam, Malacca International Airport, Malacca City	Interchange
Alor Gajah		3307	Malacca International Trade Centre I/S	Jalan MITC – Hang Tuah Jaya, Malacca International Trade Centre (MITC), Taman Tasik Utama	T-junctions
Alor Gajah			Ayer Keroh Malaysian National Service Camp		
Alor Gajah		3308	Ayer Keroh; Ayer Keroh I/C	FT 143 Ayer Keroh Highway – Ayer Keroh, Malacca City, Durian Tunggal; North–South Expressway Southern Route / AH2 – Kuala Lumpur, Johor Bahru	Cloverleaf interchange
Alor Gajah			Kolej Yayasan Saad	Jalan Kolej Yayasan Saad – Kolej Yayasan Saad	Junctions
Alor Gajah	23.1		Universiti Teknikal Malaysia Melaka (UTeM)	Universiti Teknikal Malaysia Melaka (UTeM)	
