= Malaysia Federal Route 142 =

Road in Malaysia

Federal Route 142
- Jalan Mufti Haji Khalil; Jalan Batu Berendam

Route information
- Maintained by Malaysian Public Works Department
- Length: 6.00 km (3.73 mi)

Major junctions
- South end: Malacca City; Peringgit-AMJ Highway
- FT 19 AMJ Highway; FT 143 Ayer Keroh Highway
- Northeast end: Batu Berendam

Location
- Country: Malaysia
- Primary destinations: Ayer Keroh, Malacca International Airport

Highway system
- Highways in Malaysia; Expressways; Federal; State

Federal Route 142, or Jalan Mufti Haji Khalil and Jalan Batu Berendam, is a federal road in Malacca, Malaysia. This route previously used to be known as Malacca State Route M1 on Melaka–Batu Berendam side before recommissioned as a federal road. The Kilometre Zero of the Federal Route 142 starts at Peringgit-AMJ Highway interchange.

The actual route of Federal Route 142 is Melaka–Batu Berendam side. Some web mapping services such as Google Maps shows that the Jalan Durian Tunggal–Tangkak (combination of Malacca State Route M2 and Johor State Route J21) as parts of FT142. However, that is the incorrect signing.

== Features ==
At most sections, the Federal Route 142 was built under the JKR R5 road standard, allowing maximum speed limit of up to 90 km/h (56 mph).

== Junction lists ==
The entire route is located in Melaka Tengah District, Malacca.

Legend:

- I/C - Interchange, I/S - Intersection, RSA - Rest and service area, OBR - Overhead bridge restaurant, R/R - Restaurant and rest plaza, L/B - Layby, V/P - Vista point, TN - tunnel, T/P - Toll plaza, BR - Bridge
- C - Cloverleaf, S - Stack, T-A - Trumpet-A, T-B - Trumpet-B, DT - Directional-T/Y, SDT - Semi-Directional-T/Y, P-Y - Partial-Y, D - Diamond, P-C - Partial cloverleaf, D-D - Diverging diamond, D-R - Direct ramp

Km	Exit	Name	Destinations	Notes
0.0		Malacca City; Peringgit-AMJ Highway I/C	FT 19 AMJ Highway – Alor Gajah, Tampin, Umbai, Muar, Batu Pahat; Jalan Taming Sari – City Centre, Historical Places of Malacca (UNESCO World Heritage Sites)	Diamond interchange
		Al Azim Mosque	Al Azim Mosque (Malacca's State Mosque)	
		Malacca Hospital	Malacca Hospital	
		Tun Abdul Ghafar I/S	Jalan Solok Pantai Peringgit – Galeria Seri Bendahara (Melaka Chief Minister's Museum), Tun Ghafar Baba Museum; FT 143 Ayer Keroh Highway – Bukit Beruang, Hang Tuah Jaya, Ayer Keroh; North–South Expressway Southern Route / AH2 – Kuala Lumpur, Johor Bahru	Junctions with ramp to FT143
	BR	Sungai Putat bridge		
		Taman Melaka Baru		
		Taman Batu Berendam Putra		
		Taman Ara Insan		
		Batu Berendam; Batu Berendam I/S	M128 Jalan Mohd Zin – Cheng; M2 Jalan Bachang – Bachang	Junctions
		Jalan Sungai Putat	M126 Malacca State Route M126 – Bukit Beruang, Ayer Keroh; North–South Expressway Southern Route / AH2 – Kuala Lumpur, Johor Bahru	T-junctions
6.0		Malacca Airport (Batu Berendam Airport)	Malacca Airport (Batu Berendam Airport) – Main Terminal, Arrival/Departures; M2 Jalan Durian Tunggal–Tangkak – Durian Tunggal, Kesang Pajak, Jasin	Roundabout

== See also ==
- Jalan Durian Tunggal–Tangkak – The route that always mistaken labelled as FT142
