= Malaysia Federal Route 264 =

Road in Malaysia

Federal Route 264
- Jalan Duyong–Ayer Keroh; Jalan Tun Hamzah; Jalan Gapam (Ayer Keroh–Gapam side)

Route information
- Length: 9.9 km (6.2 mi)

Major junctions
- South end: Semabok
- FT 5 FT 19 AMJ Highway; M102 Jalan Duyong–Tiang Dua; M144 Jalan Bukit Katil; M12 Jalan Gapam; FT 143 Ayer Keroh Highway
- North end: Ayer Keroh

Location
- Country: Malaysia
- Primary destinations: Duyong, Bukit Katil, Gapam

Highway system
- Highways in Malaysia; Expressways; Federal; State

Federal Route 264 (comprising Jalan Duyong–Ayer Keroh, Jalan Tun Hamzah (formerly part of Malacca State Route M107) and Jalan Gapam (formerly sections of Malacca State Route M12 between Ayer Keroh and Gapam side)) is a federal road in Malacca, Malaysia. It is a shortcut route to the North–South Expressway Southern Route via Ayer Keroh Interchange. The Kilometre Zero is located at Semabok.

== Features ==
At most sections, the Federal Route 264 was built under the JKR R5 road standard, allowing maximum speed limit of up to 90 km/h.

== Junction lists ==
The entire route is located in Melaka Tengah District, Malacca.

Legend:

- I/C - Interchange, I/S - Intersection, RSA - Rest and service area, OBR - Overhead bridge restaurant, R/R - Restaurant and rest plaza, L/B - Layby, V/P - Vista point, TN - tunnel, T/P - Toll plaza, BR - Bridge

Km	Exit	Name	Destinations	Notes
0.0		Semabok; Semabok-AMJ Highway I/S	FT 5 FT 19 AMJ Highway – Malacca City, Alor Gajah, Tampin, Umbai, Muar, Batu Pahat	3-way intersections
		Kampung Jambatan Duyong		
		Semabok Dalam I/S	Jalan Semabok Dalam – Kampung Semabok Dalam, Kampung Duyong, Perkampungan Hang Tuah (Hang Tuah Village), Perigi Hang Tuah (Hang Tuah's Well), Masjid Jamek Laksamana Hang Tuah (Admiral Hang Tuah's Jamek Mosque)	4-way intersections
		Duyong; Duyong I/S	Jalan Semabok Jaya – Taman Semabok Jaya; M102 Jalan Duyong–Tiang Dua – Ayer Molek, Tiang Dua, Bemban, Jasin	4-way intersections
		Kampung Bukit Baharu		
		Taman Duyong Permai		
		Jalan Kiai Haji Hashim I/S	Jalan Kiai Haji Hashim – Kampung Pulau Upeh, Taman Bukit Katil Permai	4-way intersections
		Taman Bukit Katil		
		Kampung Bukit Sama Tahu		
		Bukit Katil; Bukit Katil I/S	M144 Jalan Bukit Katil – Batu Berendam, Malacca City, Ayer Keroh, Bemban, Jasin; North–South Expressway Southern Route / AH2 – Kuala Lumpur, Johor Bahru	4-way intersections
		Taman Tun Rahah		
		Taman Saujana I/S	Jalan Wawasan – Taman Saujana; Jalan Kampung Tun Razak – Kampung Tun Razak, Kampung Ulu Tehel	4-way intersections
		Ozana Impian		
		Melaka Perdana		
		Gapam; Gapam I/S	M12 Jalan Gapam – Bemban, Jasin	3-way intersections
		Seri Negeri Roundabout	Seri Negeri, Seri Bendahara (Malacca Chief Minister's Residence)	Roundabout
		Ministry of Home Affairs, Malacca		
		World Youth Foundation (WYF) Complex		
		Ayer Keroh; Ayer Keroh Highway I/S	Persiaran Ayer Keroh – Hang Tuah Jaya, Melaka International Trade Centre (MITC), Malacca Planetarium, Al-Alami Mosque; FT 143 Ayer Keroh Highway – Malacca City, Bukit Beruang, Durian Tunggal, Universiti Teknikal Malaysia Melaka (UTeM); North–South Expressway Southern Route / AH2 – Kuala Lumpur, Johor Bahru	4-way intersections
