= Malacca State Route M126 =

Road in Malaysia

Melaka Route 126
- Jalan Sungai Putut

Major junctions
- West end: Batu Berendam
- FT 142 Jalan Batu Berendam; M29 Jalan Ayer Keroh Lama; FT 143 Ayer Keroh Highway
- East end: Ayer Keroh

Location
- Country: Malaysia
- Primary destinations: Bukit Beruang

Highway system
- Highways in Malaysia; Expressways; Federal; State

Jalan Sungai Putat (Malacca State Route M126) is a major road in Malacca state, Malaysia. The road connects Batu Berendam to Ayer Keroh. It is also a shortcut road to North–South Expressway Southern Route via Ayer Keroh Interchange from Batu Berendam.

== Junction lists ==
The entire route is located in Melaka Tengah District, Malacca.

Legend:

- I/C - Interchange, I/S - Intersection, RSA - Rest and service area, OBR - Overhead bridge restaurant, R/R - Restaurant and rest plaza, L/B - Layby, V/P - Vista point, TN - tunnel, T/P - Toll plaza, BR - Bridge
- C - Cloverleaf, S - Stack, T-A - Trumpet-A, T-B - Trumpet-B, DT - Directional-T/Y, SDT - Semi-Directional-T/Y, P-Y - Partial-Y, D - Diamond, P-C - Partial cloverleaf, D-D - Diverging diamond, D-R - Direct ramp

Location	km	Name	Destinations	Notes
Batu Berendam		Batu Berendam; Sungai Putat I/S	FT 142 Malaysia Federal Route 142 – Jasin, Durian Tunggal, Batu Berendam Airport, Malacca City	3-way intersections
Sungai Putat		Kampung Sungai Putat		
Sungai Putat		Sungai Putat bridge		
Bukit Beruang		Ayer Keroh Lama I/S	Jalan Muzaffar Shah – Taman Muzaffar Shah, Royal Malaysian Police Melaka Contingent Headquarters; M29 Jalan Bukit Beruang – Bukit Beruang, Istana Melaka (Yang di-Pertua Negeri (Governor's) Palace), Multimedia University (MMU) (Malacca Campus)	4-way intersections
Ayer Keroh		Ayer Keroh Health Clinic	Ayer Keroh Health Clinic	
Ayer Keroh		Hang Tuah Jaya; Hang Tuah Jaya I/S	Jalan Utama MITC – Hang Tuah Jaya, Melaka International Trade Centre (MITC), Planetarium Melaka, Al-Alami Mosque	3-way intersections
Ayer Keroh		Malacca State Syariah High Court	Malacca State Syariah High Court	
Ayer Keroh		Ayer Keroh; Ayer Keroh Highway I/S	FT 143 Ayer Keroh Highway – Ayer Keroh, Ayer Keroh Golf and Country Club, Dataran Sejarah, Malacca Zoo, Crocodile Farm, Mini Malaysia, Malacca City; North–South Expressway Southern Route / AH2 – Kuala Lumpur, Johor Bahru	3-way intersections
1.000 mi = 1.609 km; 1.000 km = 0.621 mi
