= ProJET =

Malaysian chain of petrol stations

- Company type: Petroleum
- Industry: Petrol Stations
- Founded: 1999
- Defunct: 2007; 19 years ago
- Fate: Merged with Shell
- Headquarters: Malaysia
- Area served: Parts of Klang Valley, Negeri Sembilan and Melaka
- Owner: ConocoPhillips and Sime Darby

ProJET was a chain of petrol stations in Malaysia that was touted as the country's first "Superstation", offering refueling services that accepted both credit card and cash payments, along with additional facilities. The chain, formed in 1999, was eventually absorbed into the country's chain of Shell stations in 2007.

== History ==
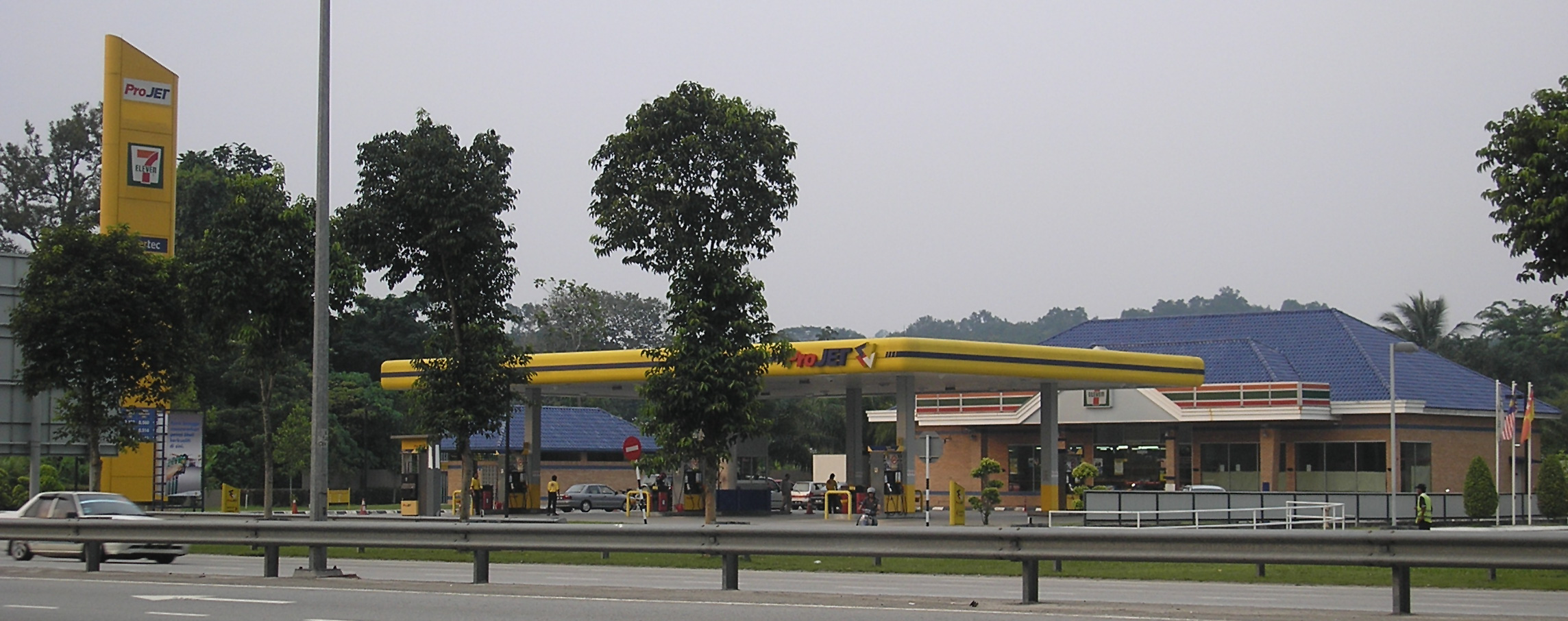
ProJET petrol station along Cheras-Kajang Expressway, pictured in 2007

In 1999, Dialog Group Bhd signed a Memorandum of Understanding with ProJET Malaysia Sdn Bhd as an Authorised Branded Marketer to build, own and operate up to 150 ProJET "superstations", petrol retails and convenience stores. In 2005, ProJET rented out its convenience stores to Convenience Shopping Sdn Bhd to operate the 24-hour 7-Eleven stores, to improve its offerings to customers.

At the time of the stations' grand opening, ProJET had only acquired more than five years of experience in the petroleum business since its introduction by ConocoPhillips, in conjunction with Sime Darby Bhd. ProJET was the first foreign company in 30 years to be awarded a license to operate petrol stations in Malaysia.

Despite a relatively smooth launch, ProJET was unable to penetrate the petroleum retail market in the country during the following years. In 2003, ProJET was reported to control about 1% of the local petroleum market.

In August 2007, Royal Dutch Shell PLC received Malaysia's approval to acquire 100% of ConocoPhillips's wholly owned subsidiary Conoco Jet (Malaysia) Sdn Bhd, which at the time operated the ProJET retail marketing assets in Malaysia. As a result, all ProJET stations were remodelled into Shell stations in late-2007. The ProJET name remains in use independently.

== Stations ==
ProJET was reported to have owned up to 40 stations, primarily in various portions of the Klang Valley, encompassing Selangor and Kuala Lumpur, and outlying states.

- Ampang Jaya
- Damansara Jaya
- Jalan Banting
- Kajang
- Malim Jaya, Malacca
- Senawang
- Puchong Kinrara
- Puchong Permai
- Shah Alam
- Taman Connaught, Cheras
- Jalan Ulu Kelang
- Wangsa Maju (Section 5)
- Johor Bahru

== See also ==
- Jet, a similarly named petrol station chain operated by ConocoPhillips.
