= MKZ =

MKZ or mkz may refer to:

- Lincoln MKZ, mid-size luxury car from the Lincoln Motor Company
- Makasae language, a Papuan language (ISO 639-3)
- Malacca International Airport in Malaysia (IATA code)
- MKZ Medienkulturzentrum Dresden e. V. (Center for Media Culture), a research center of Dresden University of Technology
