= Bukit Beruang =

Town in Malacca, Malaysia

- Neighbourhood
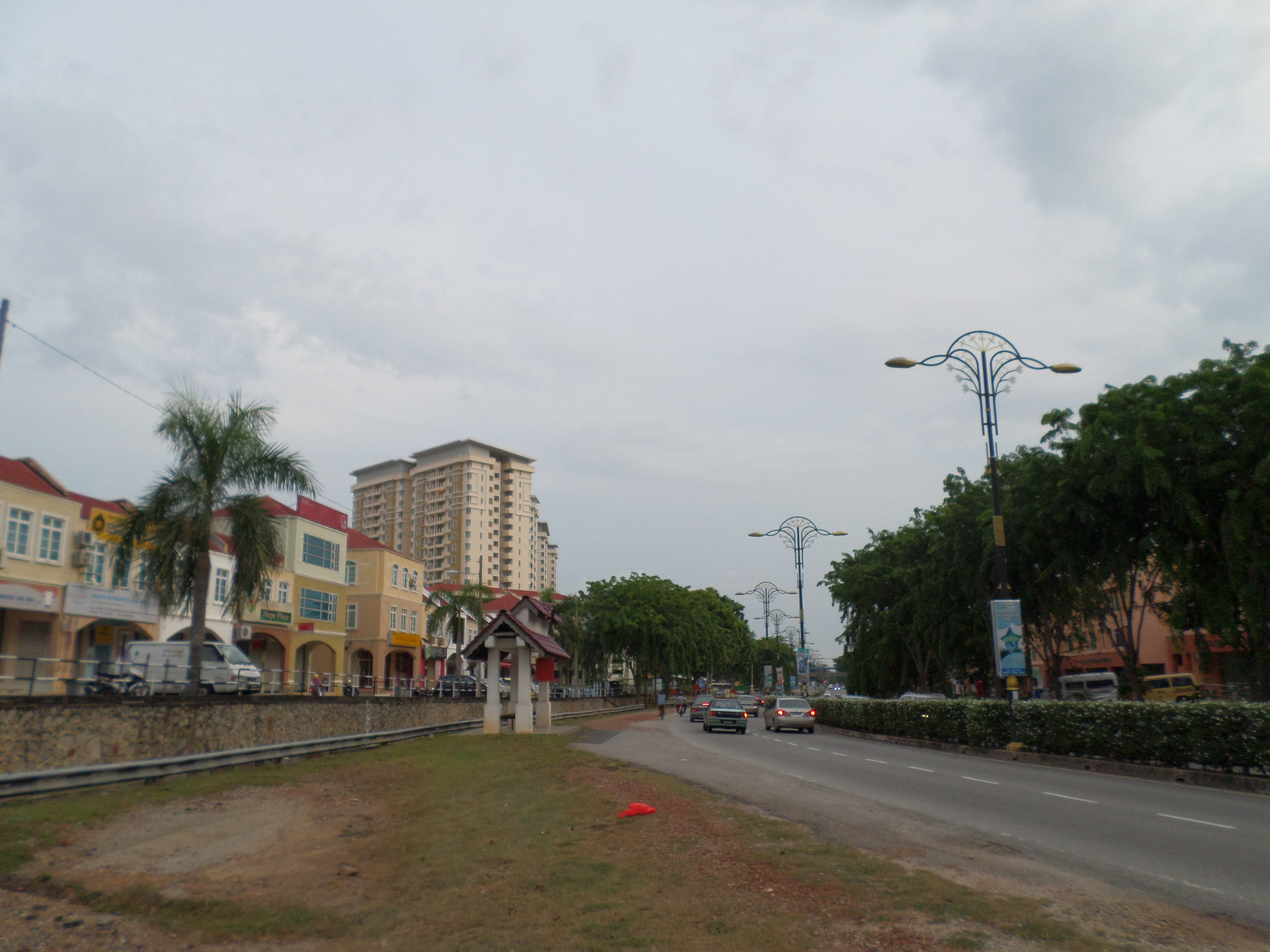
- Part of south bound Jalan Bukit Beruang, the namesake main road of the town. On the left are shophouses of Taman Bukit Beruang Permai, and on the right are those of Taman Bukit Beruang Indah. In the background are residential blocks of Ixora Apartment.
- Interactive map of Bukit Beruang
- Coordinates: 2.240°N 102.279°E
- Country: Malaysia
- State: Malacca
- City/Town: Malacca City (South); Hang Tuah Jaya (North)
- District: Melaka Tengah
- Postal code: 75450

Bukit Beruang (lit. 'Bear Hill') is a neighbourhood of Malacca City in the Malaysian state of Malacca named after an eponymous hill north of the neighbourhood with a height of 116.3 metres (382 ft), which is a famous spot for hiking. Located 8.8 km (5.5 mi) north of the city centre, it lies within the Bukit Baru suburb and adjacent to the towns of Batu Berendam, Peringgit, Ayer Keroh, Bukit Piatu and Semabok. The main tertiary education institution in Bukit Beruang is the Malacca Campus of the Multimedia University (MMU), a private university owned by telecommunication company Telekom Malaysia located at the foot of Beruang Hill.

== Residential estates ==
- Bukit Beruang Public Housing (the earliest among the earliest)
- Taman Bunga Raya- TBRS3 & TBR'Teratai (road to Bukit Beruang)
- Taman Bukit Melaka
- Taman Kerjasama-(earliest taman in Bkt Beruang)
- Taman Faridah-(Only have 6 house)
- Taman Megah
- Taman Bukit Beruang
- Taman Bukit Beruang Utama- 7 Terbalek B.A.Sejagat
- Taman Dahlia
- Taman Bukit Beruang Permai
- Taman Bukit Beruang Indah
- Taman Sentosa
- Taman Seroja
- Kampung Bukit Beruang Jaya
- Taman Melawis
- Kampung Baru Bukit Beruang
- Kampung Saga Bukit Beruang
- Kampung Wakaf
- Kampung Telok
- Seri Temenggong Police Flat
- Ixora MMU Kondom
- Taman Saujana Gemok Wan Hotak Hang

== Education ==
- Multimedia University Malacca Campus (Malay: Kampus Melaka Universiti Multimedia)
- Bukit Beruang National School (Malay: Sekolah Kebangsaan Bukit Beruang)
- Bukit Beruang (Chinese) National Type School (Malay: Sekolah Jenis Kebangsaan (Cina) Bukit Beruang)

== Hotels ==
- Beruang Hill Urban Resort
