= Johor State Route J192 =

Road in Johor, Malaysia

Johor Route 192
- Jalan Naib Long

Route information
- Length: 1.80 km (1.12 mi)

Major junctions
- Northwest end: Jalan Sialang
- FT 23 Federal Route 23; J21 State Route J21
- Southeast end: Tangkak

Location
- Country: Malaysia

Highway system
- Highways in Malaysia; Expressways; Federal; State

Johor State Route J192, Jalan Naib Long is a major state road in Tangkak District, Johor, Malaysia. The 1.80 km (1.12 mi) route serves as the alternative route from Muar and Sungai Mati to Jasin, Asahan and Nyalas.

== History ==
In June 2022, the local government has been installed the "Turn Left if no vehicles" on five intersections, including Jalan Hospital junctions, Taman Payamas junctions, Jalan Hasan junctions, Bandar Tangkak junctions and Jalan Naib Long junctions.

On 2 April 2024, an accident involved one motorcycle and one car happened at Jalan Naib Long near the Kampung Padang Lerek 1, a motorcyclist killed immediately.

== Features ==
- One traffic light at Sekolah Rendah Agama Bandar Tangkak.

== Junction lists ==
The entire route is located in Tangkak District, Johor.

Location	km	mi	Name	Destinations	Notes
Tangkak			Jalan Muar	FT 23 Malaysia Federal Route 23 – Muar, Malacca, Batu Pahat, Sungai Mati, Bukit Gambir, Sagil, Jementah, Segamat	T-junctions
Tangkak			Jalan Sri Tangkak	Jalan Sri Tangkak	T-junctions
Tangkak			Kampung Bukit Kecil	J21 Jalan Sialang – Malacca, Jasin, Asahan, Nyalas, Bukit Gambir, Serom, Town Centre	T-junctions
1.000 mi = 1.609 km; 1.000 km = 0.621 mi
