= Chin-Chin =

Swiss punk band

- Origin: Biel, Switzerland
- Genres: Indie rock; punk rock; C86; twee pop
- Years active: 1982–1988
- Labels: Farmer Records; 53rd & 3rd Records
- Past members: Karin; Esther; Marie-Anne; Carol

Chin-Chin (also known as Chin Chin) were an all-female Swiss indie/punk rock band formed in 1982 in Biel, Switzerland. The trio consisted of Karin (guitar/vocals), Esther (bass/vocals), and Marie-Anne (drums/vocals). They are considered the nearest thing Switzerland produced to a C86 band and gained recognition in the UK through John Peel and a BBC radio session for Janice Long. Their music blended Ramones-style punk with 1960s girl group harmonies and glam rock influences.

== History ==
=== Formation and early years (1982–1983) ===
Chin-Chin were formed in 1982 in Biel, Switzerland, by Karin (guitar/vocals), Esther (bass/vocals), and Marie-Anne (drums/vocals). Esther and Marie-Anne had previously been singers in Sophisticated Boom Boom, a local all-female new wave/indie pop band from Büren an der Aare that released a self-titled album in 1982. Neither had actually played bass or drums before; Karin had a background in classical and acoustic guitar but had never played rock music. Undeterred, they began rehearsing covers of classics like The Ronettes' "Baby, I Love You" and The Crystals' "Da Doo Ron Ron," as well as originals.

The Swiss punk band SOZZ (who ran the label Farmer Records) allowed Chin-Chin to rehearse in their practice room and lent them guitars and a drum kit until they could afford their own instruments. In November 1983, Chin-Chin played their first gig at the AJZ/Coupole in Biel. Although the band started life as a trio, it was always the aim to recruit a lead singer and a second guitarist, but the search proved very difficult.

=== Early releases and Sound of the Westway (1984–1985) ===
The trio briefly expanded to a quartet with the addition of a singer named Carol, and recorded their debut single, "We Don't Wanna Be Prisoners," in 1984. They soon returned to the original trio format, with Marie-Anne taking over lead vocals.

In 1985, they released their debut album, Sound of the Westway, on Farmer Records. The 13-track album was recorded in just seven days and received positive press, including an interview with NME journalist Everett True and airplay from BBC legend John Peel. The album has since become one of the most sought-after Swiss punk releases.

In 2010, the album was reissued on vinyl by Slumberland Records in conjunction with Mississippi Records, featuring new artwork and mastering.

=== UK recognition, final single, and BBC session (1986–1988) ===
Following the positive reception in the UK, Chin-Chin were signed by the management of Scottish indie band The Shop Assistants, whose fans they were. They toured Germany with The Shop Assistants and released their second and final single, "Stop! Your Crying" / "Cry in Vain," in 1986 on the Shop Assistants' label, 53rd & 3rd Records (run by David Keegan and Stephen Pastel). Stephen Pastel later recalled: "where did (the fabulous) chin-chin come from? they were a swiss band and they played with the shop assistants when the shop assistants were touring europe. they were just massive shop assistants fans and they really just wanted to be on the same label as the shop assistants, and they just sent over their tape." In 1987, the single was expanded into an 8-song 12-inch compilation also titled Stop! Your Crying, featuring tracks from the EP alongside selections from Sound of the Westway.

They also served as support acts for The Pogues, Anti-Nowhere League, New Model Army, TV Personalities, and Die Toten Hosen.

In 1988, Chin-Chin recorded a four-track session for BBC Radio 1's Janice Long show. The session included songs that were never recorded elsewhere. The band split sometime after this session, leaving behind a small but well-regarded discography.

=== Cry in Vain compilation and later reissues (2021–2023) ===
In 2021, Optic Nerve Recordings reissued the "Stop! Your Crying" single as a limited-edition 7-inch on half-blue/half-yellow vinyl as part of their Optic Sevens 3.0 series.

In 2023, Optic Nerve Recordings released Cry in Vain, a 14-track career-spanning compilation featuring tracks from the 7-inch single "We Don't Wanna Be Prisoners" (1984), the Sound of the Westway LP (1985), the 12-inch single "Stop! Your Crying" (1986), and the previously unreleased Janice Long BBC session from 1988. The compilation received positive reviews, with critics praising its blend of punk energy and pop hooks.

== Musical style and influences ==
Chin-Chin's music drew from a wide range of influences, including The Clash, Ramones, X-Ray Spex, Blondie, Generation X, Siouxsie and the Banshees, David Bowie, Motown, 1960s girl groups, and glam rock bands like T. Rex and Slade. Their sound has been described as a blend of DIY punk, bubblegum pop, catchy harmonies, fuzz guitars, and twee pop, and they have been noted as precursors to the riot grrrl movement of the early 1990s. Critics have compared them to The Shop Assistants, The Pastels, Talulah Gosh, Girls at Our Best!, and Kleenex.

== Critical reception and legacy ==
Maximum Rocknroll described their music as "pure punky pop perfection, just an unadulterated rush of wild BUZZCOCKS/RAMONES energy with sped-up '60s girl group harmonies, like the Stiff Records-era GO-GO'S given a full Creation Records treatment." The same publication called "Stop! Your Crying" and "Cry in Vain" "anthemic buzzsaw bangers for the ages" and hailed the band as "legit femme-punk godhead."

Spectrum Culture wrote that Cry in Vain is "an excellent, well-chosen compilation" and noted that the band's music is "vibrant, a little patchy and a lot of fun." The review also highlighted the band's "soaring-but-wistful, 'Be My Baby'-layered harmonies."

Chin-Chin have been recognized as one of the only all-female bands in Switzerland during the 1980s writing their own material, playing regular gigs, and releasing records. Their album Sound of the Westway has become one of the most sought-after 80s indie-pop records.

== Band members ==
- Karin – guitar, vocals
- Esther – bass, vocals
- Marie-Anne – drums, vocals (lead vocals from 1984 onward)
- Carol – vocals (briefly in 1984)

== Discography ==
=== Albums ===
==== Sound of the Westway (1985) ====
Released on Farmer Records. Reissued in 2010 on Slumberland/Mississippi Records with new artwork and mastering.

Side one
No.	Title	Length
1.	"Dark Days"
2.	"My Guy"
3.	"Never Surrender"
4.	"Even If It's a Lie"
5.	"Jungle of Fear"
6.	"Why Am I So Lonely?"
7.	"Room of Sadness"

Side two
No.	Title	Length
8.	"War"
9.	"Love Song"
10.	"Proud Soldiers"
11.	"Stay With Me"
12.	"Dead Life"
13.	"Why Am I So Lonely II"
14.	"Da Doo Ron Ron / My Boy Lollipop"

=== EPs and singles ===
==== "We Don't Wanna Be Prisoners" 7-inch (1984) ====
Released on Farmer Records.

No.	Title	Length
1.	"We Don't Wanna Be Prisoners"
2.	"Desires Only"
3.	"The World's Burning"

==== "Stop! Your Crying" 12-inch (1986) ====
Released on 53rd & 3rd Records. Expanded to 8-song compilation Stop! Your Crying in 1987.

No.	Title	Length
1.	"Stop! Your Crying"
2.	"Revolution"
3.	"Cry in Vain"

=== Compilations ===
==== Stop! Your Crying (1987) ====
8-song 12-inch compilation released on 53rd & 3rd Records. Features tracks from the 1986 single alongside selections from Sound of the Westway.

No.	Title	Length
1.	"Stop! Your Crying"
2.	"Revolution"
3.	"Cry in Vain"
4.	"Dark Days"
5.	"My Guy"
6.	"Why Am I So Lonely?"
7.	"War"
8.	"Never Surrender"

==== Cry in Vain (2023) ====
14-track compilation released on Optic Nerve Recordings. Includes the previously unreleased Janice Long BBC session from 1988.

From the "We Don't Wanna Be Prisoners" 7-inch (1984)
No.	Title	Length
1.	"We Don't Wanna Be Prisoners"
2.	"Desires Only"
3.	"The World's Burning"

From Sound of the Westway (1985)
No.	Title	Length
4.	"Dark Days"
5.	"My Guy"
6.	"Never Surrender"
7.	"Why Am I So Lonely?"
8.	"War"

From the "Stop! Your Crying" 12-inch (1986)
No.	Title	Length
9.	"Stop! Your Crying"
10.	"Revolution"
11.	"Cry in Vain"

From the Janice Long BBC session (previously unreleased)
No.	Title	Length
12.	"Cheat Boy Cheat"
13.	"Inescapable"
14.	"Nowhere to Run"
