= Hang Tuah Jaya Municipal Council =

Local authority in Hang Tuah Jaya, Malaysia

Hang Tuah Jaya Municipal Council Majlis Perbandaran Hang Tuah Jaya

Type
- Type: Local authority of Hang Tuah Jaya

History
- Founded: 1 January 2010

Leadership
- President: Sapiah Haron
- Municipal Secretary: Rohaya Abdullah

Meeting place
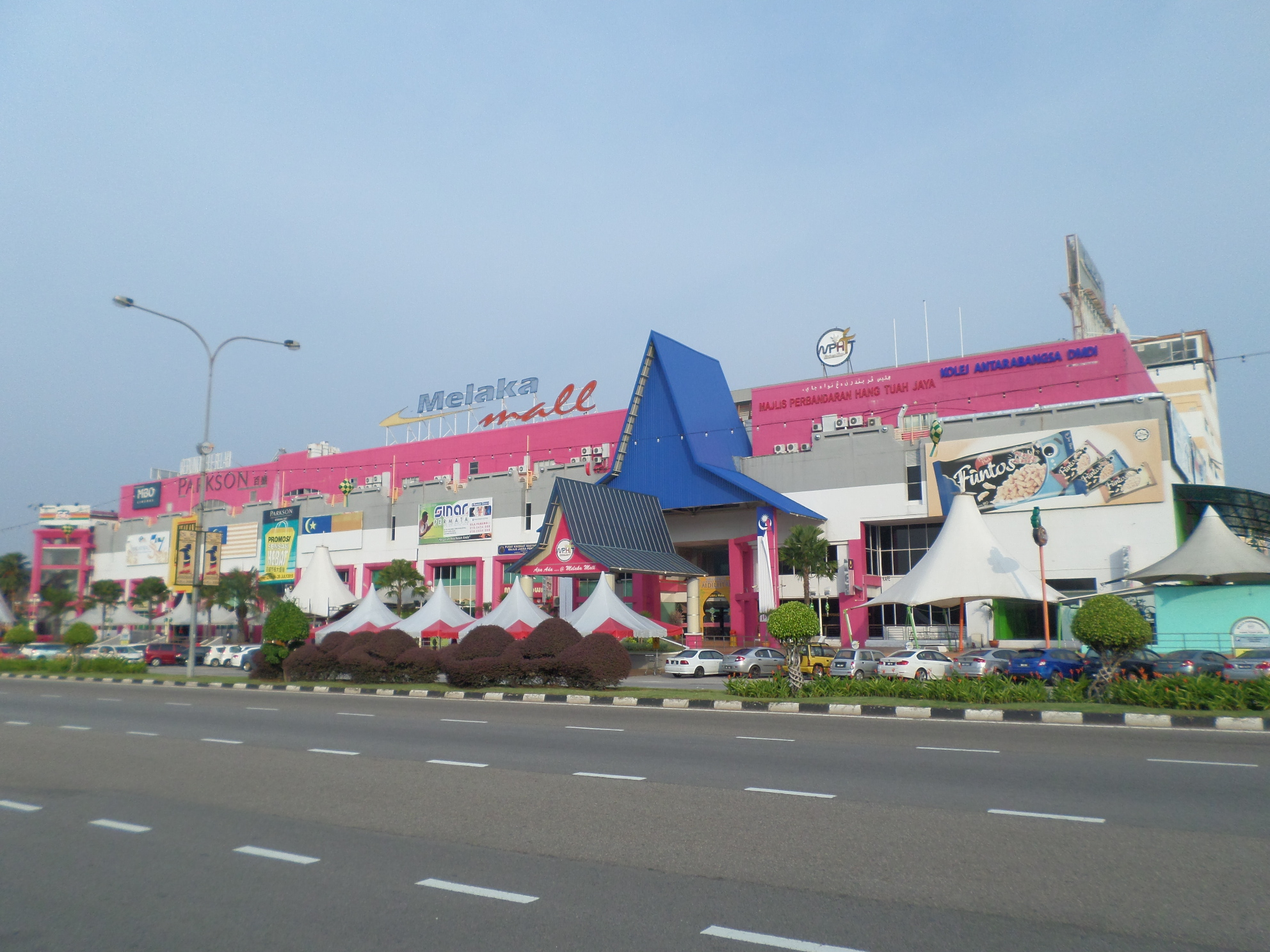
- SF-01, Aras 2, Kompleks Melaka Mall, Jalan Tun Abdul Razak - Lebuh Ayer Keroh, Hang Tuah Jaya, 75450, Ayer Keroh, Melaka.

Website
- www.mphtj.gov.my

Hang Tuah Jaya Municipal Council (Malay: Majlis Perbandaran Hang Tuah Jaya, MPHTJ) is the local authority which administers Hang Tuah Jaya, a municipality covering an area of 145.5886 square kilometres (35,975.7 acres) and consists of the northern part of Melaka Tengah District, the western part of Jasin District and the southeastern part of Alor Gajah District in Malacca, Malaysia.

Like all local governments in Malaysia, MPHTJ are responsible for public health and sanitation, waste removal and management, town planning, environmental protection and building control, social and economic development and general maintenance functions of the town's urban infrastructure. The MPHTJ main headquarters is located at Melaka Mall (formerly known as Kotamas) in Ayer Keroh, Hang Tuah Jaya, opposite the headquarters of Malacca City Council along Ayer Keroh Highway.

Hang Tuah Jaya Municipal Council was established under Section 3 of the Local Government Act 1976, (Act 171) as the Local Authority of Hang Tuah Jaya and began operations on 1 January 2010.

== Organisation ==
=== List of presidents ===
#	Name of President	In office
1	Kamarudin Md Shah	2010–2011
2	Sapiah Haron	2011–2014
3	Zali Mat Yasin	2014–2015
4	Mansor Sudin	2015–2017
5	Murad Husin	2017–2018
6	Mahani Masban	2018–2019
7	Mohd Rafee Ibrahim	2019–31 March 2020
8	Shadan Othman	1 April 2020 – 31 January 2023
9	Sapiah Haron	1 February 2023–present

== Departments and Units ==
12 Departments and 5 Units

- Internal Audit Unit
- Law Unit
- One Stop Centre Unit
- Arrears Management Unit
- Integrity Unit
- Management Service Department
- Financial Department
- Enforcement Department
- Property Evaluation and Management Department
- Urban Planning Department
- Engineering Department
- Licensing Department
- Corporate and Social Service Department
- Zoo Department
- Information Technology Department
- Landscape and Environmental Health Department
- Building Control Department

== See also ==
- Malacca City Council
- Iskandar Puteri City Council
- Putrajaya Corporation
