= Malaysia Heritage Studios =

Theme park in Ayer Keroh, Malacca, Malaysia

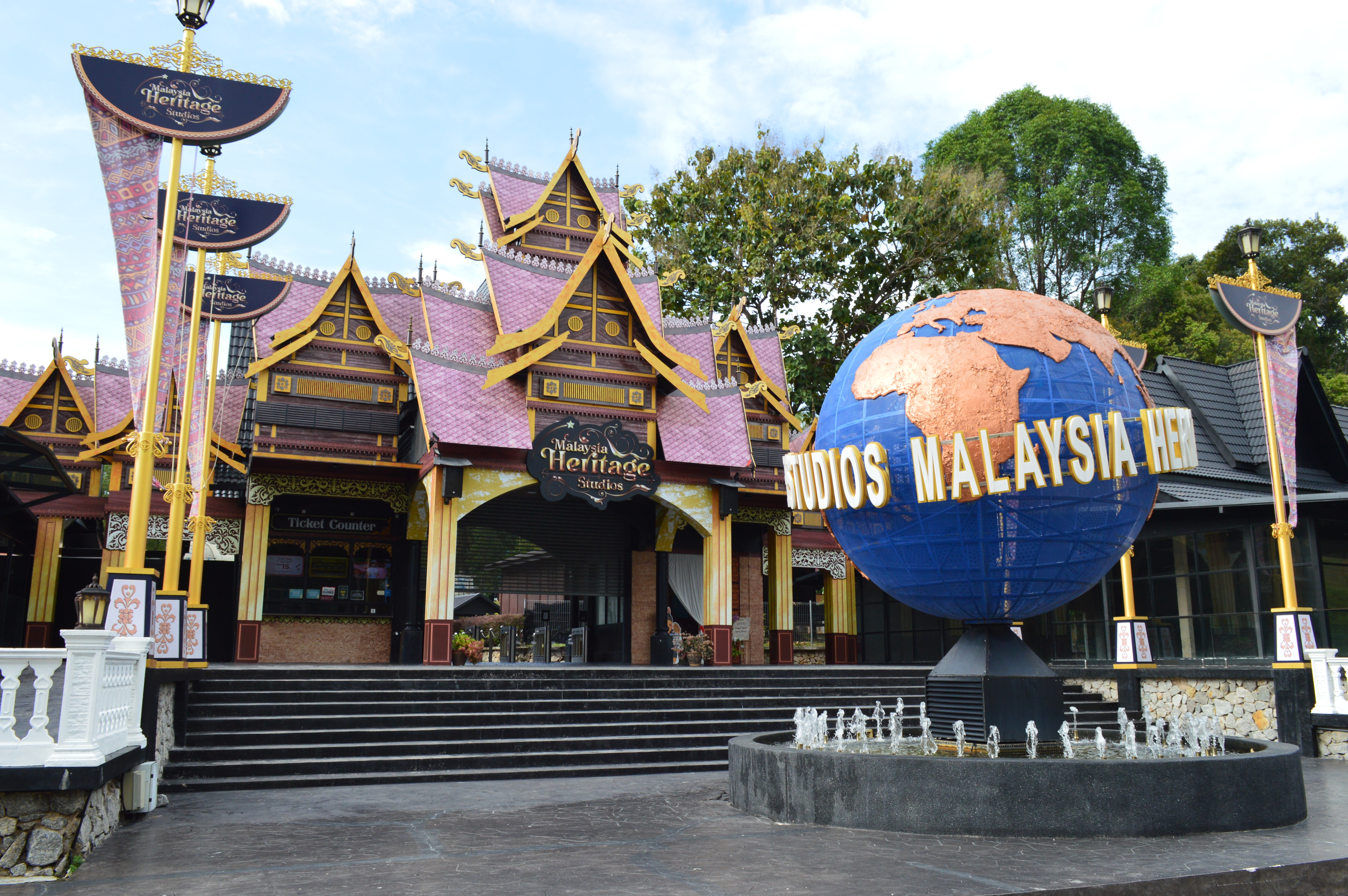
- Interactive map of Malaysia Heritage Studios
- Location: Ayer Keroh, Malacca, Malaysia
- Coordinates: 2°16′50.5″N 102°18′02.3″E
- Status: Operating
- Theme: Southeast Asia
- Website: Official website

Mini Malaysia Cultural Park
- Status: Operating
- Opened: 17 July 1986

Mini ASEAN Cultural Park
- Status: Operating
- Opened: 3 September 1991

Malaysia Heritage Studios, formerly Mini Malaysia and ASEAN Cultural Park (Malay: Taman Mini Malaysia dan ASEAN), is a cultural theme park in Ayer Keroh, Malacca, Malaysia. It is divided into two sections – the Mini Malaysia section, which was opened on 17 July 1986 and showcases the traditional houses from every state in Malaysia and the Mini ASEAN section, which was opened on 3 September 1991 and showcases the traditional houses from every member countries of the Association of Southeast Asian Nations (ASEAN).

On 19 December 2022, Mini Malaysia and ASEAN Cultural Park was renovated and reopened as "Malaysia Heritage Studios". Each of the houses in Mini Malaysia became into art galleries and museums, and the central area became a gallery for mythological creatures from Malay and local folklore, such as the Garuda bird. Additionally, there is also a globe statue at the entrance bearing the Park's name, which is surrounded by water fountain similar to Universal Studios, Inc. logo. Malaysia Heritage Studios was officially opened on 5 February 2024.

== Exhibitions ==
=== Mini Malaysia ===
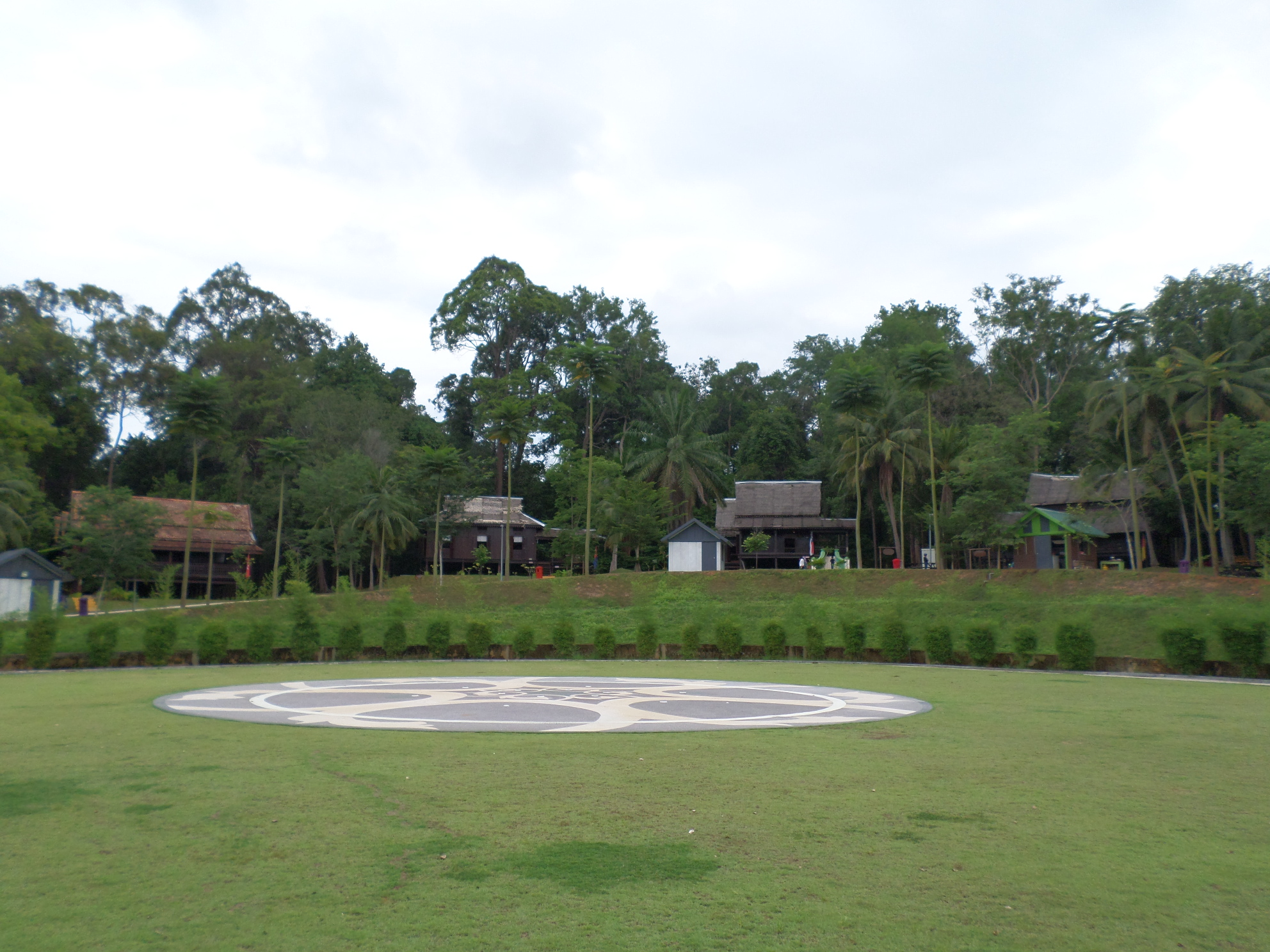
Mini Malaysia

- Perlis Long Roofed House
- Penang Long Roofed House
- Kedah Long Roofed House
- Perak Long Roofed House
- Selangor Long Roofed House
- Negeri Sembilan Long Roofed House
- Malacca Long Roofed House
- Johore Five Roofed House
- Kelantan Long Roofed House
- Terengganu Five Roofed House
- Pahang Long Roofed House
- Sabah Traditional House
- Sarawak Traditional House

=== Mini ASEAN ===
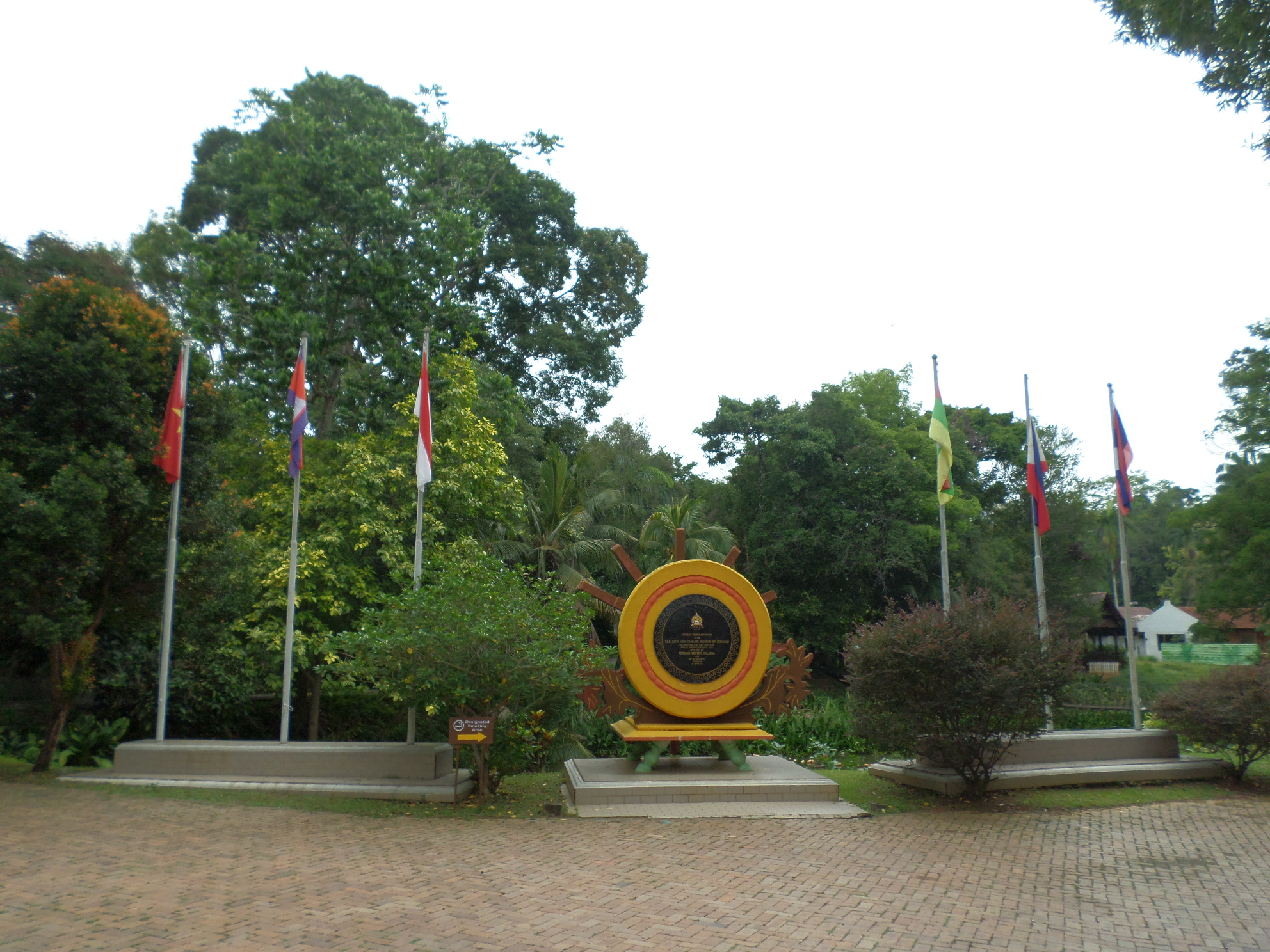
Mini ASEAN

- Traditional House of Thailand
- Traditional House of Philippines
- Traditional House of Brunei
- Traditional House of Indonesia
- Traditional House of Singapore
- Traditional House of Vietnam
- Traditional House of Myanmar
- Traditional House of Cambodia
- Traditional House of Laos

== See also ==
- List of tourist attractions in Malacca
