= Taman Malim Jaya =

Coordinates: 2°14′30″N 102°14′00″E

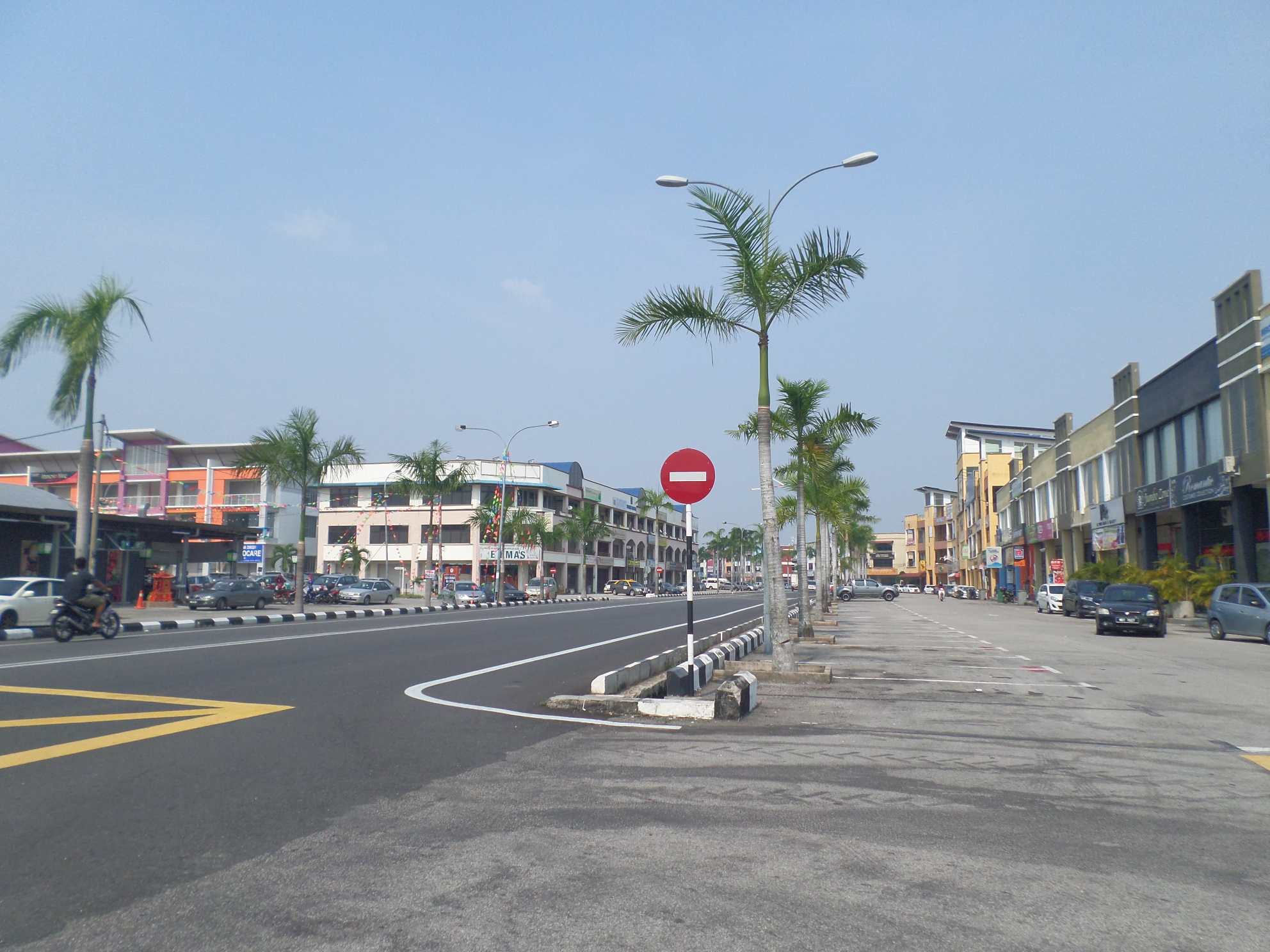
Malim Jaya

Taman Malim Jaya is a residential area and business district in Batu Berendam, Melaka Tengah District, Malacca, Malaysia.

== Transport ==
In August 2023, changes of ways on two junctions accessing the area were planned out by departments due to frequent accidents.

== Education ==
- Sekolah Menengah Kebangsaan Malim
- Sekolah Kebangsaan Malim
