= Malacca General Hospital =

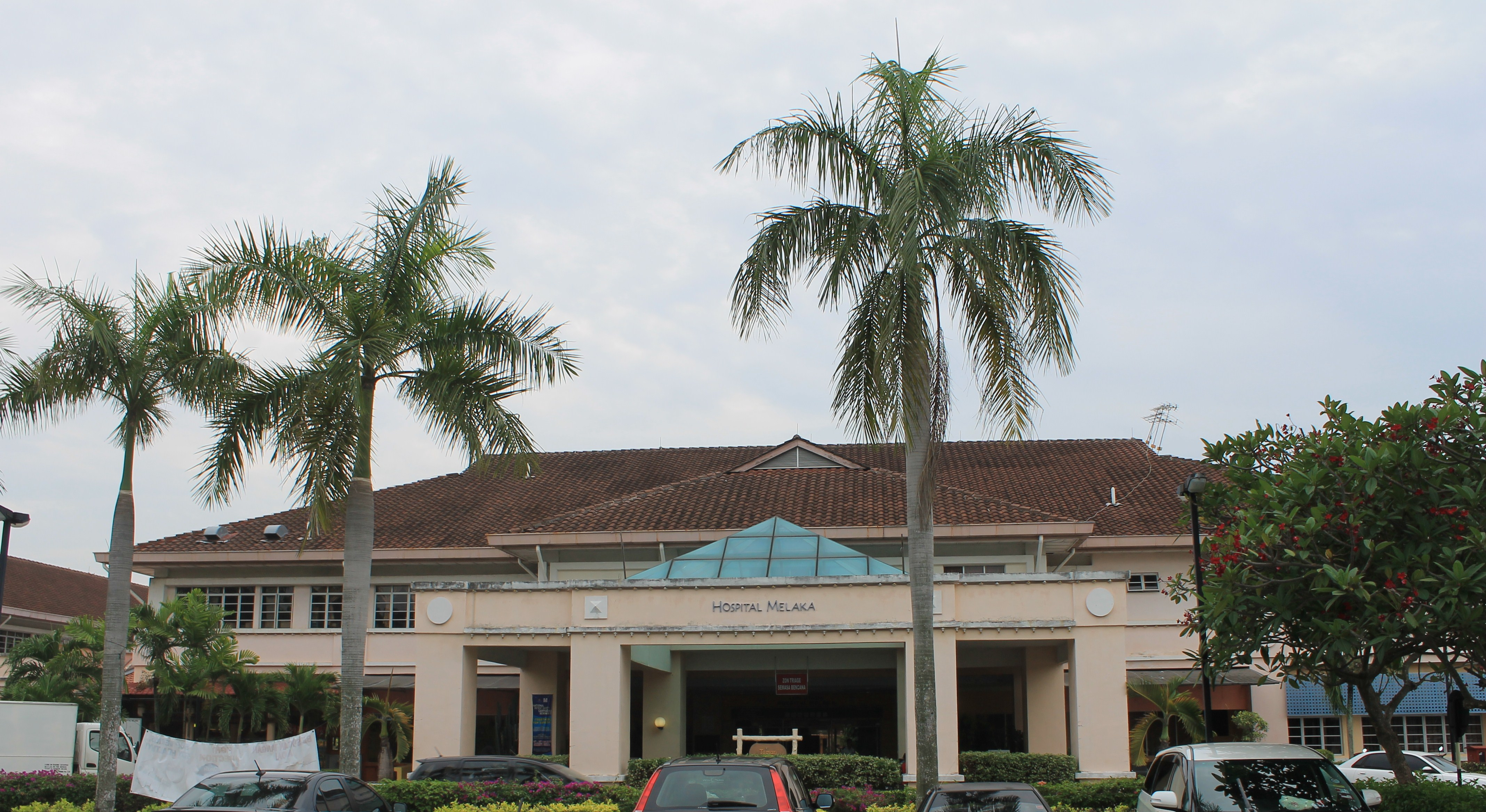

Geography
- Location: Malacca City, Center Malacca, Malacca, Malaysia
- Coordinates: 2°13′1″N 102°15′41″E

Organisation
- Care system: Public
- Type: District General

Services
- Emergency department: Yes
- Beds: 806

History
- Founded: 12 February 1934

Links
- Website: hmelaka.moh.gov.my

Malacca General Hospital (Malay: Hospital Besar Melaka) is a government-funded district general hospital in Malacca City, Center Malacca, Malacca, Malaysia. A secondary and specialist hospital, it serves as a referral centre for patients from primary and health centres in the state as well as the northern part of Johor and the Tampin district of Negeri Sembilan.

== Location ==
The general hospital is located in the Jalan Peringgit/Jalan Bukit Palah which is about 15 minutes drive from the Malacca City. It has a land area of approximately 17.4 acres (7.0 ha) and possesses well-equipped facilities and infrastructure. An expansion plan is currently in progress which will add several new buildings on the site.

== History ==
With initial funding of Straits Settlement $2.34 million, Malacca General Hospital opened on 12 February 1934 in a ceremony over which Sir Cecil Clementi presided. The grand opening was also attended by British Colonial Secretary Andrew Caldecott, Commanding Officer Major General Lewin, Director of Medical Treatment and Health Dr R.D. Fitzgerald, Resident Counselor M.W. Millington and many other well-known guests including 700 people from Malacca.

== Infrastructure and facilities ==
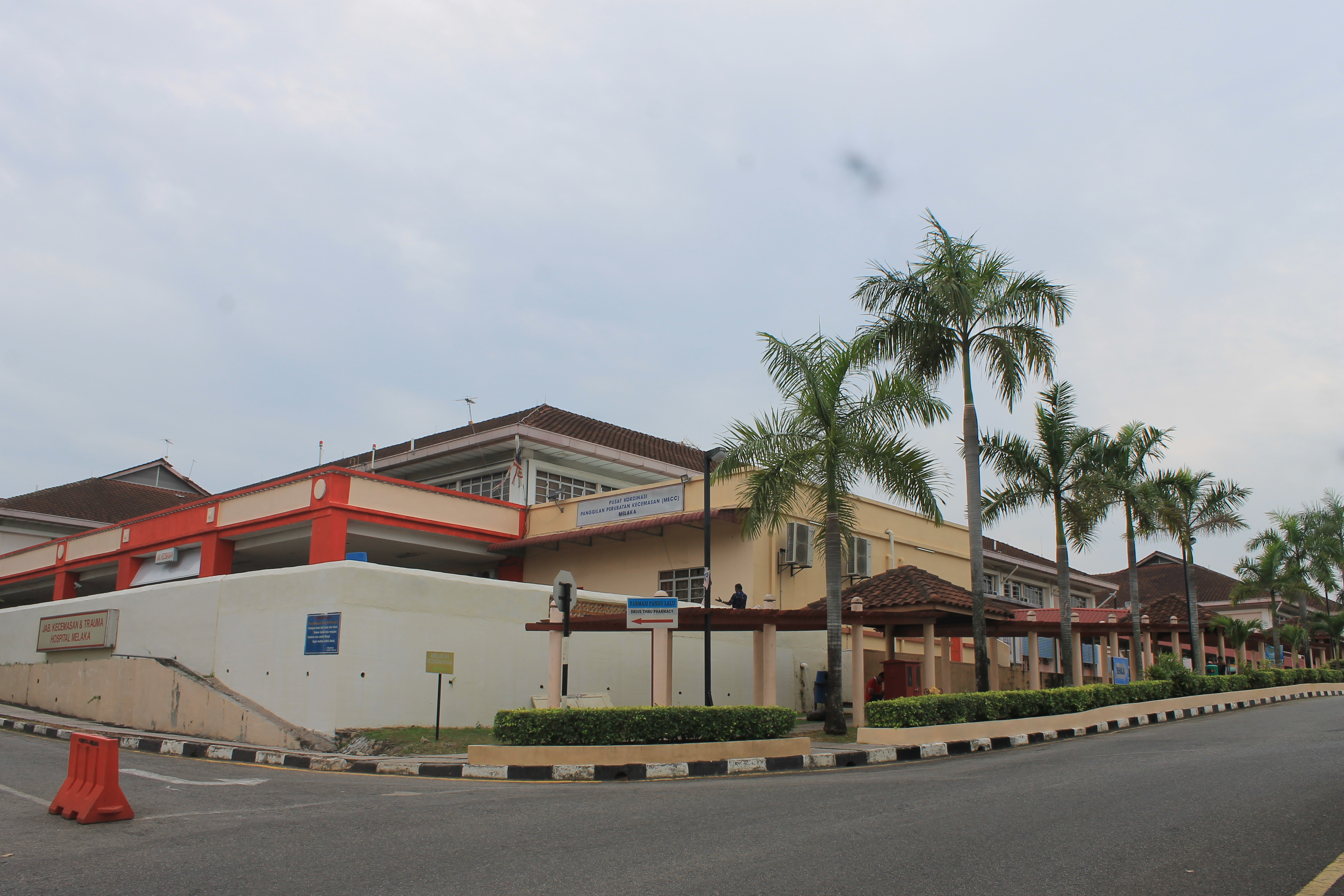
Emergency and trauma department of Malacca General Hospital

Set within landscaped gardens for the comfort of patients and visitors, the hospital has remained fully equipped with medical facilities and infrastructure since its opening. There are four ward blocks providing 806 beds across 17 wards. Other basic necessities including telephones, ATMs and vending machines along with many others are within easy reach in the hospital. There are also a cafeteria, mosque and waiting rooms.

Due to its location, Malacca General Hospital receives referrals from all the peripheral clinics and hospitals in Malacca as well as from neighbouring states such as Johor (Tangkak, Muar) and Negeri Sembilan (Tampin). As a result, the hospital is generally busy with an ever-increasing workload. On occasion bed occupancy rates in some wards exceed 100%.

== Medical Education and services ==
=== Melaka Manipal Medical College ===
Along with Muar General Hospital, Malacca General Hospital serves as one of the two main teaching hospitals for medical students from the Melaka Manipal Medical College, which itself is situated within walking distance of the hospital.

=== Malacca Midwifery School ===
Opened on 1 February 1982, the school's purpose is to provide midwifery course for nurses from the Malaysian Ministry of Health as well as the corporate and defence sectors. Theoretical and practical sessions are conducted at the school.

=== Malacca Nursing School ===
The Malacca Hospital Nursing School provides basic training for nurses from all over Malaysia. Instruction incorporates theoretical as well as practical experience in the Malacca General Hospital under a three-year programme that covers all aspects of nursing care. Upon completion, nurses are posted to hospitals all over the country. The nursing school is well equipped and staffed by dedicated nursing tutors. It is an accredited nursing training institution for Malaysia.

== Chest Clinic ==
The Chest Clinic is the registration center for all tuberculosis cases in Malacca and keeps records of every such patient in the city. This clinic also provides health education for tuberculosis patients and their families.

All tuberculosis treatments and outpatient services including appointments and revisions are also managed by the clinic, as well as the provision of anti-tubercular medicines and tuberculosis program cards to all medical centres and wards. The clinic is the referral center for specialist services and has a special lab to examine sputum samples as well as Acid-fast Bacilli (AFB) Culture Research.

== See also ==
- Healthcare in Malaysia
