= Durian Tunggal =

Town in Malacca, Malaysia

- Suburb
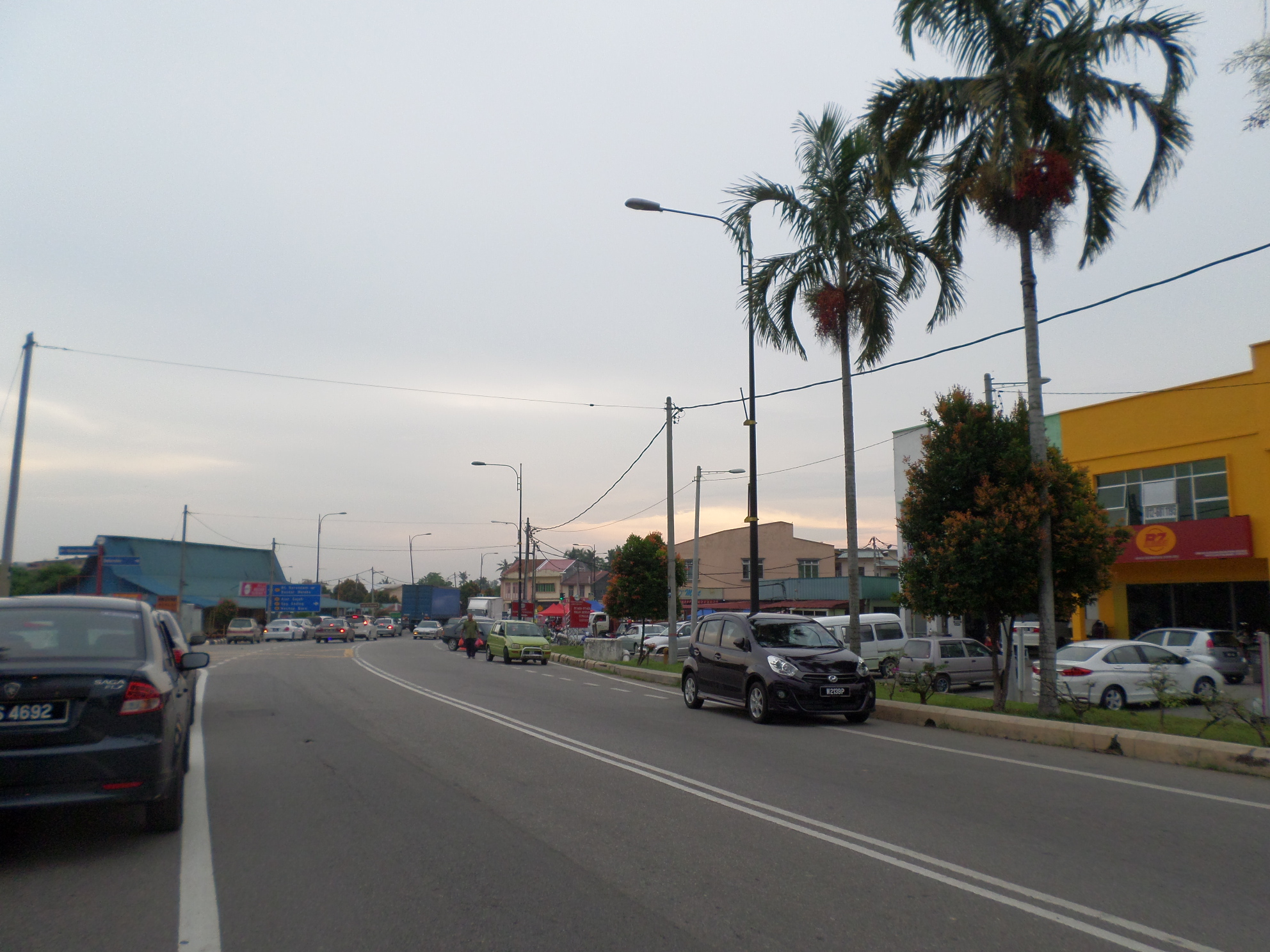
- Durian Tunggal Town Centre, at the intersection of Malaysia Federal Route 142 and Jalan Durian Tunggal (Route M29) – the main road of the town
- Interactive map of Durian Tunggal
- Coordinates: 2°19′N 102°17′E
- Country: Malaysia
- State: Malacca
- Town: Alor Gajah (North); Hang Tuah Jaya (South)
- District: Alor Gajah

Area
  - Total: 50.20 km^{2} (19.38 sq mi)
  - Suburb: 50.01 km^{2} (19.31 sq mi)
  - Town: 0.19 km^{2} (0.073 sq mi)

Population (2020)
  - Total: 42,185
  - Density: 840.3/km^{2} (2,176/sq mi)
- Postal code: 76100

Durian Tunggal (translated as only/sole durian) is a mukim and town in Malacca, Malaysia. Geographically part of Alor Gajah District, it lies adjacent to towns like Ayer Keroh, Kesang, Ayer Panas and Machap. Since 2010, 69% of the town (34.90414 km^{2} (13.47656 mi^{2})) came under Hang Tuah Jaya Municipal Council jurisdiction, while the rest is administered by Alor Gajah Municipal Council.

== Education ==
Kindergarten

- Kampung Gangsa Social Welfare Department Kindergarten
- PASTI Al Affian Islamic Early Childhood Education Centre (Malaysian Islamic Party affiliated)

Primary Schools

- Durian Tunggal National Primary School
- Durian Tunggal Malacca Islamic Religious Department Religious Primary School
- Sin Wah National Type Chinese Primary School
- Durian Tunggal Tamil National Type Primary School

Secondary Schools

- Durian Tunggal National Secondary School (Malay: Sekolah Menengah Kebangsaan Durian Tunggal)

Tertiary Institutions

- Universiti Teknikal Malaysia Melaka (Main campus)

== Infrastructures ==
- Durian Tunggal Reservoir - A reservoir with a capacity of 32,600,000 cubic metres (26,400 acre⋅ft) and whose inflow is the Malacca River. It is one of the main source of water supply to residents in Malacca.

== Religious sites ==
- An-Naim Mosque
- Durian Tunggal Muslim Cemetery
- Qing Xuan Kong Temple (Taoist Temple)
- Sri Astha Thasa Puja Kaliamman (Hindu Temple)

== Tourist attractions ==
- Melaka International Motorsport Circuit (MIMC) - A motorsport racetrack which was built at a cost of RM 9.9 million and opened in 2009.

== See also ==
- Alor Gajah District
- Hang Tuah Jaya
