= Tun Abdul Ghafar Baba Memorial =

- Memorial Tun Abdul Ghafar Baba
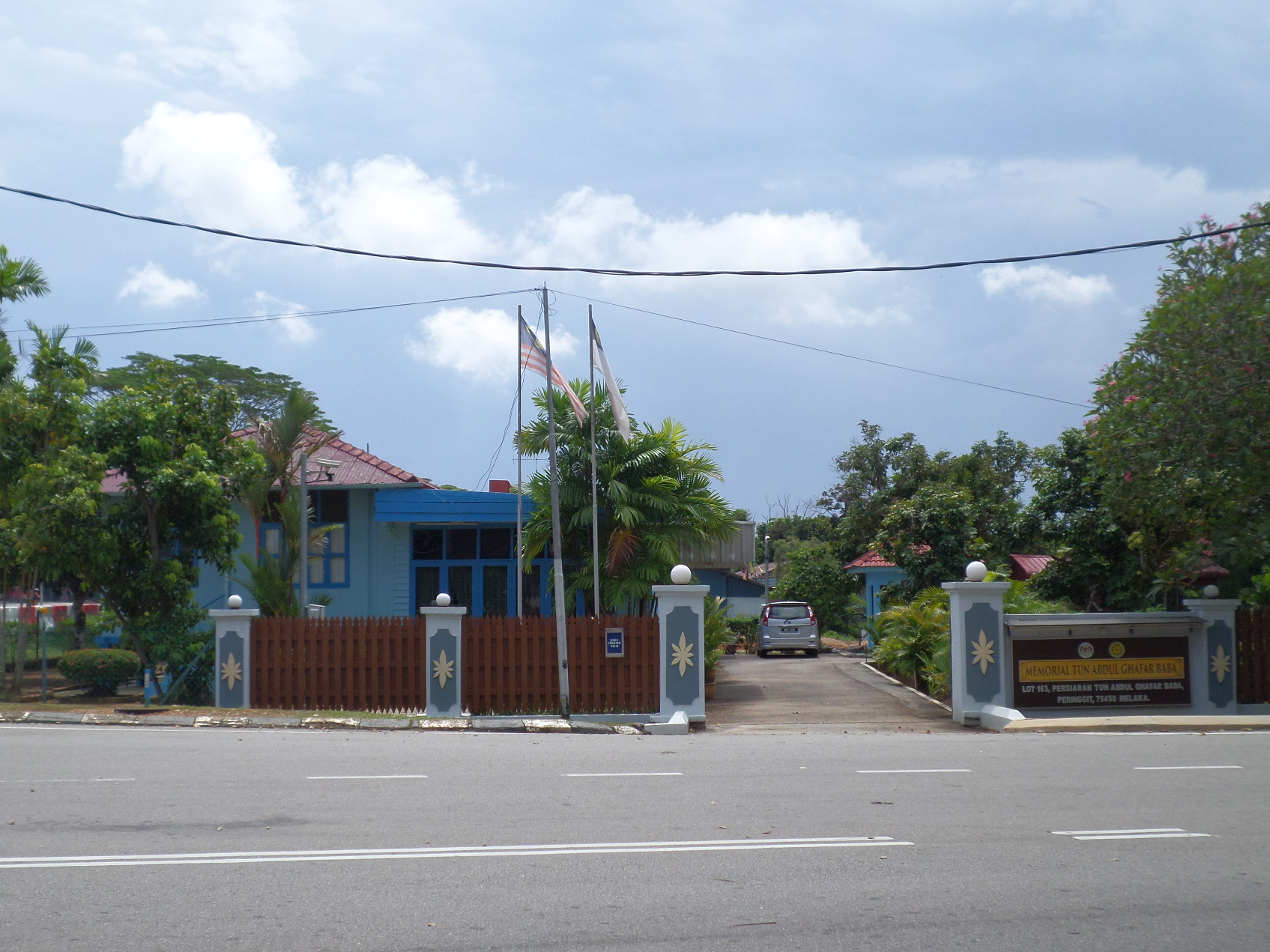
- Entrance of the Memorial
- Established: 28 February 2006
- Location: Peringgit, Malacca, Malaysia
- Coordinates: 2°13′23.7″N 102°15′35.5″E
- Type: museum
- Owner: National Archives of Malaysia

Tun Abdul Ghafar Baba Memorial (Malay: Memorial Tun Abdul Ghafar Baba) is a museum in Peringgit, Malacca, Malaysia, which commemorates the life of Abdul Ghafar Baba, who was the Deputy Prime Minister of Malaysia from 1986 to 1993 under Prime Minister Mahathir Mohamad and the Chief Minister of Malacca from 1959 to 1967. Constructed in 1956 and served as Ghafar Baba's residence when he was the chief minister of the state, the building was converted into a memorial and was opened to the public on 28 February 2006.

The memorial is divided into two exhibition halls, a lower and an upper: The lower hall displays most of Ghafar Baba's personal belongings from his tenure as Chief Minister of Malacca, Minister and Deputy Prime Minister. The upper hall displays his various souvenirs, photos, books, a television set, and other miscellaneous furniture items and fittings that were used by him and his family.

== See also ==
- List of tourist attractions in Malacca
- List of museums in Malaysia
