= Universiti Teknikal Malaysia Melaka =

Public university in Malacca, Malaysia

Coordinates: 2°18′50″N 102°19′06″E

- اونيۏرسيتي تيكنيكل مليسيا ملاك (Jawi)
- Emblem
- Former name: Kolej Universiti Teknikal Kebangsaan Malaysia
- Motto: Kompetensi Teras Kegemilangan
- Motto in English: Excellence Through Competency
- Type: Public
- Established: 1 December 2000; 25 years ago
- Affiliations: ASAIHL; MTUN
- Chancellor: Tuan Yang Terutama Tun Seri Setia (Dr.) Hj. Mohd. Ali bin Mohd. Rustam (Governor of Malacca)
- Vice-Chancellor: Prof. Ts. Dr. Massila Kamalrudin
- Academic staff: 879(April 2020)
- Administrative staff: 1,184
- Students: 12,852 (April 2020)
- Undergraduates: 11,470 (April 2020)
- Postgraduates: 1,382 (April 2020)
- Location: Hang Tuah Jaya, 76100 Durian Tunggal, Melaka, Malaysia, Hang Tuah Jaya, Durian Tunggal, Malacca, Malaysia
- Language: English, Bahasa Malaysia
- Website: www.utem.edu.my

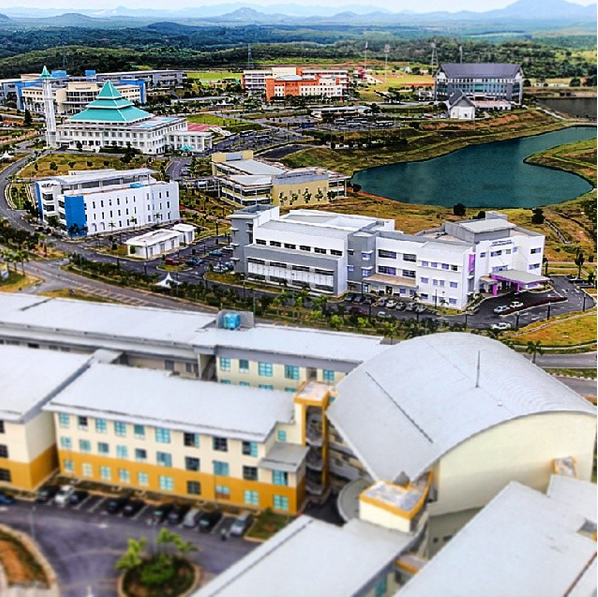
Bird's-eye view of Universiti Teknikal Malaysia Melaka main campus in Durian Tunggal

First Kolej Universiti Teknikal Kebangsaan Malaysia Emblem (2000–2002)

Second Kolej Universiti Teknikal Kebangsaan Malaysia Emblem (2002–2007)

Universiti Teknikal Malaysia Melaka (Jawi: اونيۏرسيتي تيكنيكل مليسيا ملاك, literally meaning Technical University of Malaysia, Malacca, abbreviated as UTeM) is a public university located in Durian Tunggal, Malacca, Malaysia. It is the first technical public university and the 14th public university overall in Malaysia. The university is considered the pioneer in the use of the "Practice and Application Oriented" teaching and learning method for tertiary level technical education in Malaysia.

UTeM was established on 1 December 2000 as Kolej Universiti Teknikal Kebangsaan Malaysia (National Technical University College of Malaysia, abbreviated as KUTKM), under Section 20 of the University and University College Act 1971 (Act 30) under the Orders of Kolej Universiti Teknikal Kebangsaan Malaysia (Incorporated) 2001. On 1 February 2007, KUTKM was upgraded into a full-fledged technical university and got its present name. At the same time, its emblem was rehashed as the University's emblem.

In 2015, the university is granted autonomy status.

== Campus ==
Its eight faculties are supported by two learning centres.

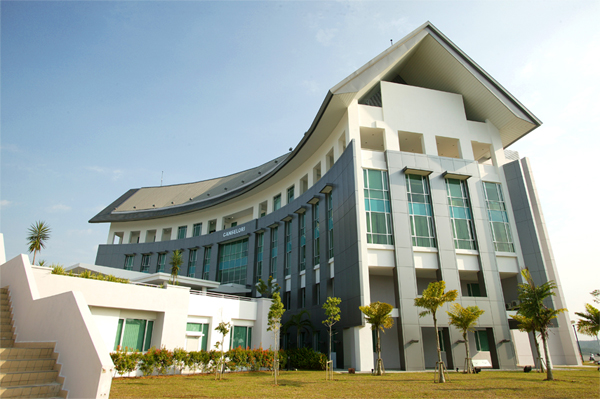
UTeM Main Campus, Durian Tunggal

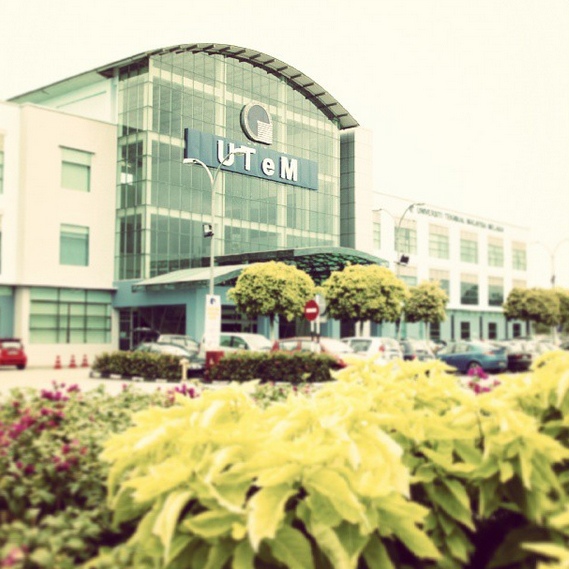
UTeM Technology Campus, Ayer Keroh

== Basic statistics ==
=== Student demography ===
As of 31 July 2019, there are:

- 10,930 students, where there are:
  - 24 Engr.D
  - 688 PhD(s) - 403 are International Students
  - 664 Masters - 113 are International Students
  - 8,383 Bachelor's degree - 161 are International Students
  - 1,171 Diploma
- 26,418 Graduates since 2005

=== Graduates' general employability ===
As of 31 May 2019, the Graduates' General Employability rate is 86%, with the breakdown statistics of:

- 65.3% Working
- 12.57% Pursuing Further Education
- 3% Improving Skillsets
- 5.13% Waiting for Placement

=== Course demography ===
As of September 2019, there are 86 programmes offered:

- 13 PhD Programmes
- 37 Masters Programmes
- 29 Degree Programmes
- 5 Diploma Programmes
- 2 New B.Tech. Programmes to be introduced September 2019

== Alumni ==
As of April 2020 there were 26,242 alumni.
