= Hang Tuah Jaya =

- Municipality
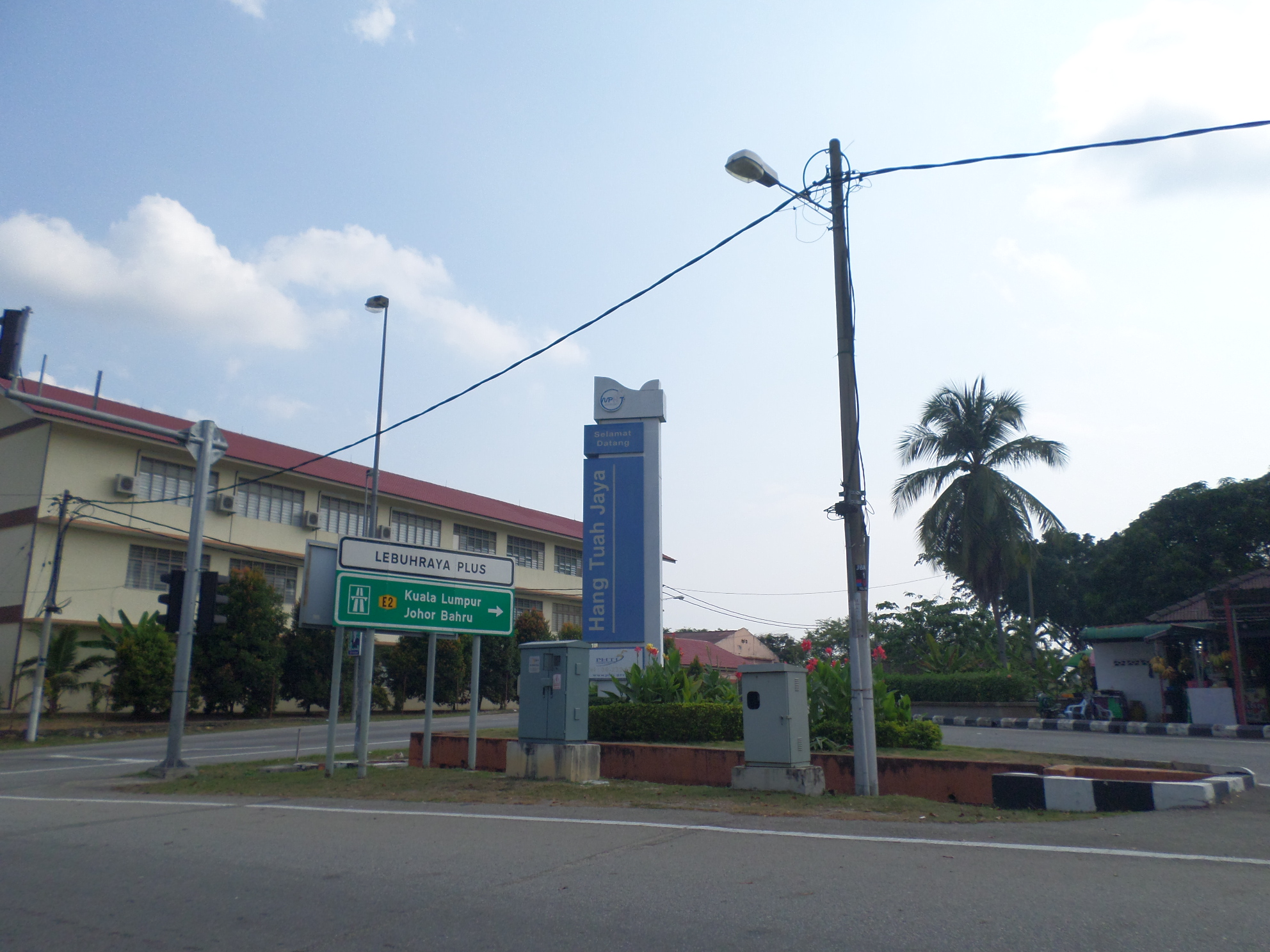

- Seal
- Etymology: Hang Tuah
- Nickname: Smart City (Bandaraya Pintar)
- Location within Malacca Location within Peninsular Malaysia
- Coordinates: 2°16′N 102°17′E
- Country: Malaysia
- State: Malacca
- District: Alor Gajah, Melaka Tengah and Jasin
- Founded: 25 June 2006
- Municipality status: 1 January 2010

Government
  - Type: Local government
  - Body: Hang Tuah Jaya Municipal Council
  - President: Sapiah Haron

Area
  - Total: 144.61 km^{2} (55.83 sq mi)
- Postal code: 75xxx to 77xxx
- Website: www.mphtj.gov.my

Logo of Hang Tuah Jaya Corporation (2005–2013).

Logo of Malacca Green Technology Corporation, successor of Hang Tuah Jaya Corporation.

Hang Tuah Jaya is a planned area in the Malaysian state of Malacca created by its government as the state's administrative centre and smart city with economical, social, infrastructural and recreational developments. It is the only landlocked municipality in the state.

== Etymology ==
Hang Tuah Jaya is named after the legendary Malay warrior – Hang Tuah and its name is a combination of the warrior's name with "jaya", a Sanskrit word adopted into Malay language which means "success" or "victory".

== History ==
Before 2010, Hang Tuah Jaya was administered by the Hang Tuah Jaya Corporation (Malay: Perbadanan Hang Tuah Jaya, PHTJ), a state government agency which was established on 1 June 2005 and headquartered at Melaka International Trade Centre (MITC) to oversee its development.

It was launched by the fifth Prime Minister of Malaysia, Abdullah Ahmad Badawi on 25 June 2006, consists of parts of Melaka Tengah, Alor Gajah and Jasin districts and covers an area of 144 square kilometres (36,000 acres). The area became a municipality on 1 January 2010 and governed by the Hang Tuah Jaya Municipal Council (Malay: Majlis Perbandaran Hang Tuah Jaya, MPHTJ), which is headquartered at Melaka Mall in Ayer Keroh, opposite the headquarters of the Malacca City Council along Ayer Keroh Highway.

After Hang Tuah Jaya Municipal Council became the local government of Hang Tuah Jaya, Hang Tuah Jaya Corporation was rebranded as the Malacca Green Technology Corporation (Malay: Perbadanan Teknologi Hijau Melaka, MGTC or PTHM) on 8 November 2013.

== Administrative area ==
The administrative area consists of parts of the following mukims:

Subdivision	Area (acre)	Area (sq mi)	Area (km^{2})
Bukit Katil	7,240.64	11.31	29.30
Batu Berendam	3,362.25	5.25	13.61
Bukit Baru	2,555.85	3.99	10.34
Bachang	538.46	0.84	2.18
Ayer Molek	449.55	0.70	1.82
Peringgit	101.01	0.16	0.41
Melaka Tengah District subtotal	14,247.76	22.26	57.66
Ayer Panas	12,735.99	19.90	51.54
Kesang	123.80	0.19	0.50
Jasin District subtotal	12,859.79	20.09	52.04
Durian Tunggal	8,625.49	13.48	34.91
Alor Gajah District subtotal	8,625.49	13.48	34.91
Total	35,733.04	55.83	144.61

Mukim can be either a subdivision of a district or a subdivision of sub-district (Section 11(c) of the National Land Code 1965).

== See also ==
- Hang Tuah Jaya Municipal Council
- Putrajaya
- Iskandar Puteri
- Malacca City
- Alor Gajah
- Jasin (town)
