= Malacca Airport =

Airport in Central Malacca, Malacca, Malaysia

Malacca Airport Lapangan Terbang Melaka
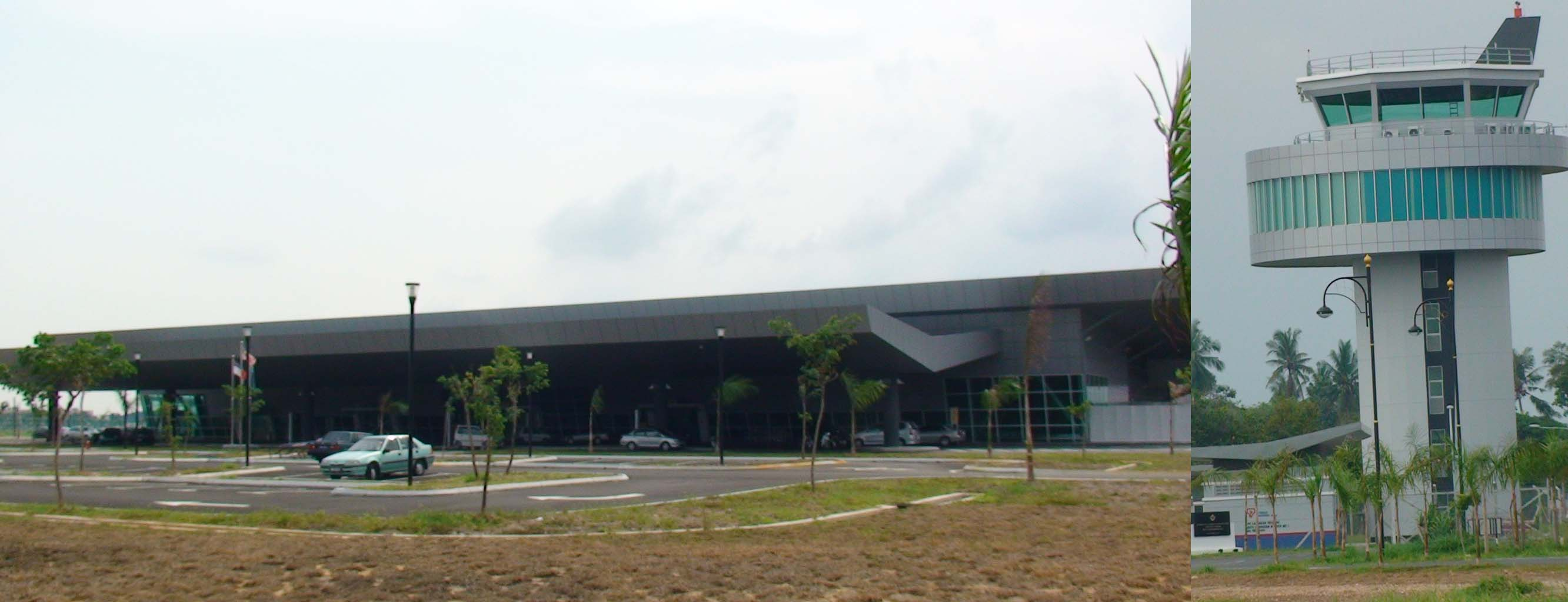
- IATA: MKZ; ICAO: WMKM

Summary
- Airport type: Public
- Owner: Khazanah Nasional
- Operator: Malaysia Airports Holdings Berhad
- Serves: Malacca, Malaysia
- Location: Batu Berendam, Malacca, Malaysia
- Time zone: MST (UTC+08:00)
- Elevation AMSL: 40 ft (12 m)
- Coordinates: 02°15′47″N 102°15′09″E

Maps
- Malacca state in Peninsular Malaysia, Malaysia

- Location in Batu Berendam, Malacca, Peninsular Malaysia MKZ /WMKM (Malaysia) MKZ /WMKM (Southeast Asia) MKZ /WMKM (Asia)

Runways
Direction	Length		Surface
Direction	m	ft	Surface
03/21	2,135	7,005	Asphalt

Statistics (2023)
- Passenger: 23,489 (▲24.8%)
- Airfreight (tonnes): 0.1 (▼41.8%)
- Aircraft movements: 41,891 (▼2.6%)
- Source: official web site AIP Malaysia

Malacca Airport (IATA: MKZ, ICAO: WMKM), previously known as Batu Berendam Airport, is situated in Batu Berendam, Malacca, Malaysia. This airport serves not only the state of Malacca but also northern Johor and Negeri Sembilan. The terminal complex, spanning 7,000 m^{2} (75,000 sq ft), is equipped with international-standard amenities and has an annual passenger capacity of 1.5 million. The airport features a 2,135-meter runway, accommodating narrowbody aircraft such as the Boeing 737 and Airbus A320.

== History ==
The construction of the airport was approved in April 1950 and was expected to be completed within a year.

The airport, which occupies 141 acres (0.57 km^{2}) of land, was completed in August 1952 at a cost of $500,000. The first plane landed at the airport the following month. The Dakota aircraft of Malayan Airways arrived at the airport four times a week.

The airport and particularly its control tower bears historical significance as it was the same tower which guided the plane of Tunku Abdul Rahman, the first Prime Minister of Malaysia, to land from London on 20 February 1956. It was in Malacca that Tunku announced the date for the independence of then Malaya from the United Kingdom. Considering the historical nature of this control tower, the Chief Minister of Malacca, Mohd Ali Rustam unsuccessfully attempted to save the tower, by either relocating it, or by changing plans to incorporate the tower. The tower was demolished during renovations in 2007.

Between 2008 and 2014, the airport was served by Sky Aviation which operated flights from Pekanbaru five times per week. Flights ceased in 2014 when Sky Aviation suspended all operations.

Malaysian airline Malindo Air launched four-weekly flights from the Malacca Airport to Penang, Malaysia, and Pekanbaru, Indonesia, on 4 November 2014.

In 2016, Indonesian airline XpressAir launched four-weekly flights from Malacca Airport to Pekanbaru, Indonesia, on 29 April 2016. China Southern Airlines launched an inaugural charter flight from Malacca Airport to Guangzhou, China, on 29 September 2016. By the end of 2016, China Southern Airlines stopped charter flights to Malacca.

The airport is also used as the base of the Malaysian Flying Academy (MFA), which has been operating out of the airport since 1987.

AirAsia group chief executive officer Tan Sri Tony Fernandes said he had discussed with Transport Minister Datuk Seri Liow Tiong Lai in Putrajaya on 29 June 2016 for the potential of turning the Malacca Airport into a low-cost terminal. Fernandes said AirAsia wanted to use the Malacca Airport but had been unable to convince MAHB to allow AirAsia to use the airport.

AirAsia marked the arrival of its inaugural flight from Penang to Malacca on 1 July 2019.

In September 2023, all commercial operations had ceased, with airlines citing lack of demand and high operational costs. The state government was subsequently offering incentives in order to woo back airlines to use the airport, yet to date to no avail. During this time, Malacca Airport served only private jets, with the entire airport running with just 39 staff on duty each day.

In October 2024, Malacca Airport had reopened, as Scoot began almost daily flights from Singapore.

== Airlines and destinations ==
=== Passenger ===
Airlines	Destinations
Scoot	Singapore

== Ground transportation ==
The airport is served by bus M12, an hourly BAS.MY local bus service operated by Handal Indah that connects the airport to Melaka Sentral from 6 am till 9 pm. Taxis and ride-hailing apps are also available at the airport.

== New terminal ==
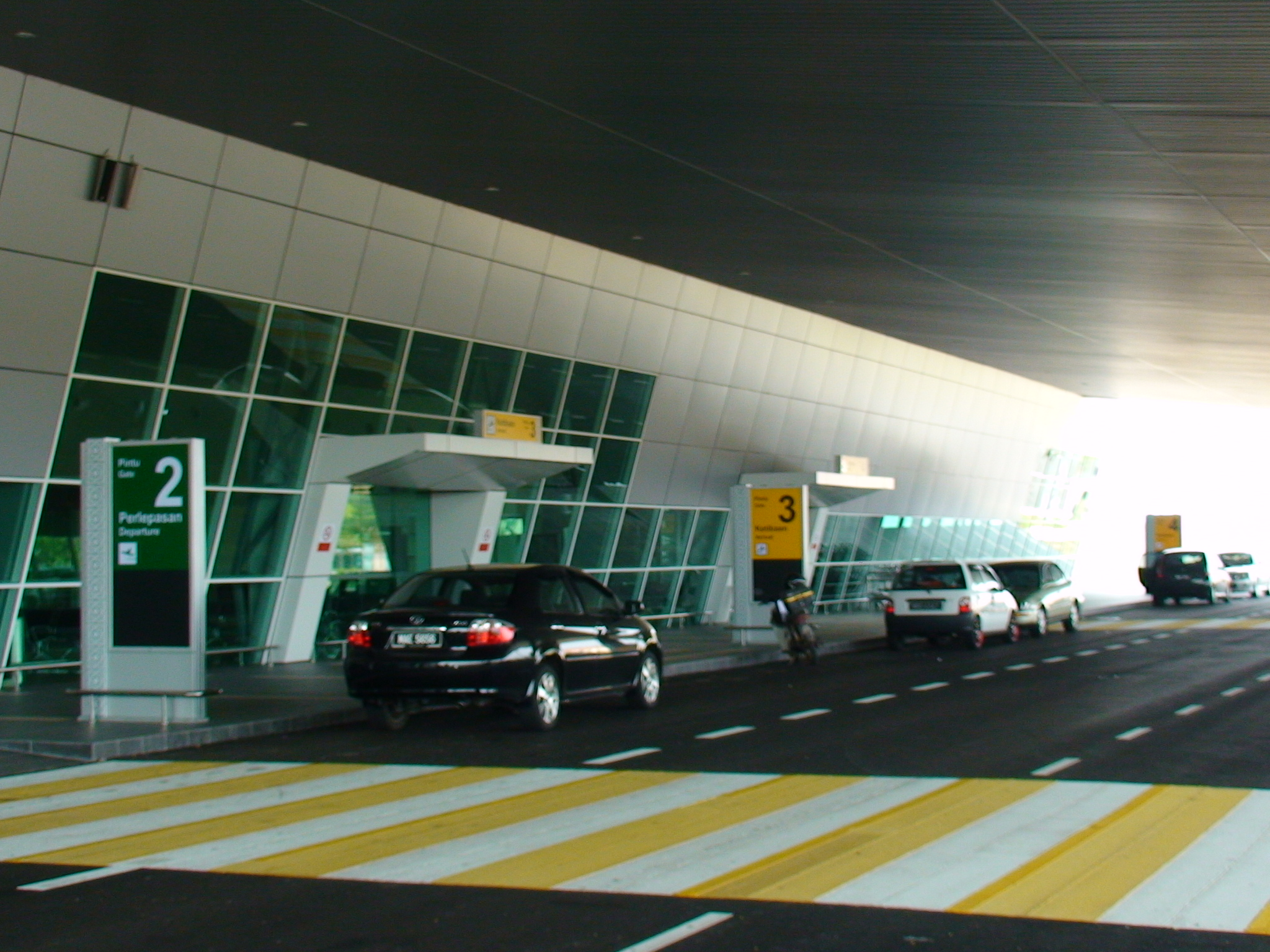
New terminal entrance

Construction of a new terminal started on 1 April 2006. The runway was upgraded from 1,372 m × 37 m (4,501 ft × 121 ft), to 2,045 m × 45 m (6,709 ft × 148 ft) and is now 2,135 m × 45 m (7,005 ft × 148 ft), allowing Boeing 737 and Airbus A320 aircraft to take off. The terminal complex was replaced by a new 7,000 m^{2} (75,000 sq ft) terminal equipped with international-standard amenities. The control tower was replaced and complemented with advanced aeronautical devices. Both ends of the runway now contain facilities to guide night landing and better assure safety in bad weather conditions.

In May 2009, the new terminal was officially opened. The new terminal could handle 1.5 million passengers annually as opposed to the 30,000 of the old terminal. The new airport terminal was officiated by the Prime Minister of Malaysia, Datuk Seri Najib Tun Razak on 4 February 2010.

== Facilities ==
APR-Aerospace Engineering has built a hangar in Malacca Airport which can accommodate Boeing 737 or Airbus A320 for Aircraft maintenance, repair and overhaul (MRO) services, Aircraft modification and retrofits, Aircraft technical handling and ground support services, Aircraft spare support and pooling, Technical training on aircraft maintenance, repair and overhaul and Structured On-the-Job Training for APR-ATC's TAME program. The hangar was completed in April 2016.

The major facilities that are found in this airport include taxi services, gift shops, cafe, duty-free outlets, conference rooms, multi-purpose meeting and event centre, wheelchair service, staff assistance and free WiFi internet access.

Malacca Airport is one of the seven airports in Malaysia that provide e-Visa facilities for Chinese tourists from September 2016 onwards.

To the west of this airport is the Batu Berendam Light Aircraft Industrial Zone, where the headquarters of Composites Technology Research Malaysia (CTRM) as well as the pilot training centre of the Malaysian Flying Academy are located. The former is the manufacturer of two-seater composite light aircraft Eagle Aircraft Eagle 150, as well as the manufacturer of several aerospace components such as aircraft wings, nacelles, empennage and doors for aviation companies like Airbus and Boeing.

== Expansion and developments ==
In August 2015, Prime Minister of Malaysia, Datuk Seri Najib Tun Razak, announced that the federal government is mulling a proposal to expand Malacca Airport, particularly in conjunction with the recent Cabinet endorsement of the southern state's "twin state" status with China's Guangzhou city. Malacca Airport will upgrade its runway, apron, aerobridge and taxiway.

In October 2016, Transport Minister Datuk Seri Liow Tiong Lai said Malacca Airport in Batu Berendam may be relocated to accommodate larger aircraft like the Boeing 777. Liow said a decision will be reached by the end of 2016 whether to move the airport to another location or to keep the airport at its present site based on the recommendation from an aviation consultant.

On 30 January 2017, State Transport, Project Rehabilitation and International Trade Committee chairman Datuk Lim Ban Hong said the runway of the state airport will be extended to 2,500 metres (m) following the decision by the Federal Government to extend the runway in a bid to accommodate larger aircraft without the need for land acquisitions while the work is expected to be completed in a short span of time. The expansion of Malacca Airport will be completed in 2019.

On 27 November 2017, Malacca CM Idris Haron said Malacca Airport is expected to upgrade next year (2018) with an upgrade cost of RM74 million (under RMKe-11). The runway will be upgraded from 2135 m to 2665 m and a taxiway will be built and the apron will be expanded as well.

On 20 September 2018, Malacca CM Adly Zahari announced that Malaysia Airports Holdings Berhad (MAHB) will introduce a five-year rebate on the passenger service charge (PSC) for flights from Malacca Airport (MKZ). Aside from the rebates, Adly said airline companies operating from MKZ will also be exempted from paying landing charges for a year. According to MAHB, the incentives were introduced as part of the group's efforts in working with the state government and airlines to promote tourism in the country.

== Traffic and statistics ==
Annual passenger numbers and aircraft statistics
Year	Passengers handled	Passenger % change	Cargo (metric tonnes)	Cargo % change	Aircraft movements	Aircraft % change
2009	18,576	Steady	127	Steady	54,160	Steady
2010	21,687	▲16.7	144	▲13.4	60,811	▲12.3
2011	21,261	▼2.0	139	▼3.5	53,702	▼11.7
2012	34,352	▲61.6	195	▲40.3	48,881	▼9.0
2013	21,637	▼37.0	N/A	Steady	36,978	▼24.4
2014	14,178	▼58.7	N/A	Steady	23,747	▼35.8
2015	69,710	▲391.7	N/A	Steady	19,800	▼16.6
2016	58,703	▼15.8	N/A	Steady	35,252	▲78.0
2017	62,076	▲5.8	N/A	Steady	37,867	▲7.4
2018	52,493	▼15.4	N/A	Steady	33,333	▼12.0
2019	135,569	▲158.3	0.1	Steady	52,072	▲56.2
2020	29,424	▼78.3	N/A	Steady	37,998	▼27.0
2021	No Data	No Data	No Data	No Data	No Data	No Data
2022	18,821	Steady	0.1	Steady	43,022	▲57.8
2023	23,489	▲24.8	0.1	▼41.8	41,891	▼2.6
^{Source: Malaysia Airports Holdings Berhad}

== See also ==
- List of airlines of Malaysia
- List of airports in Malaysia
- Busiest airports in Malaysia
