= Batu Berendam =

Town in Malacca, Malaysia

- Suburb
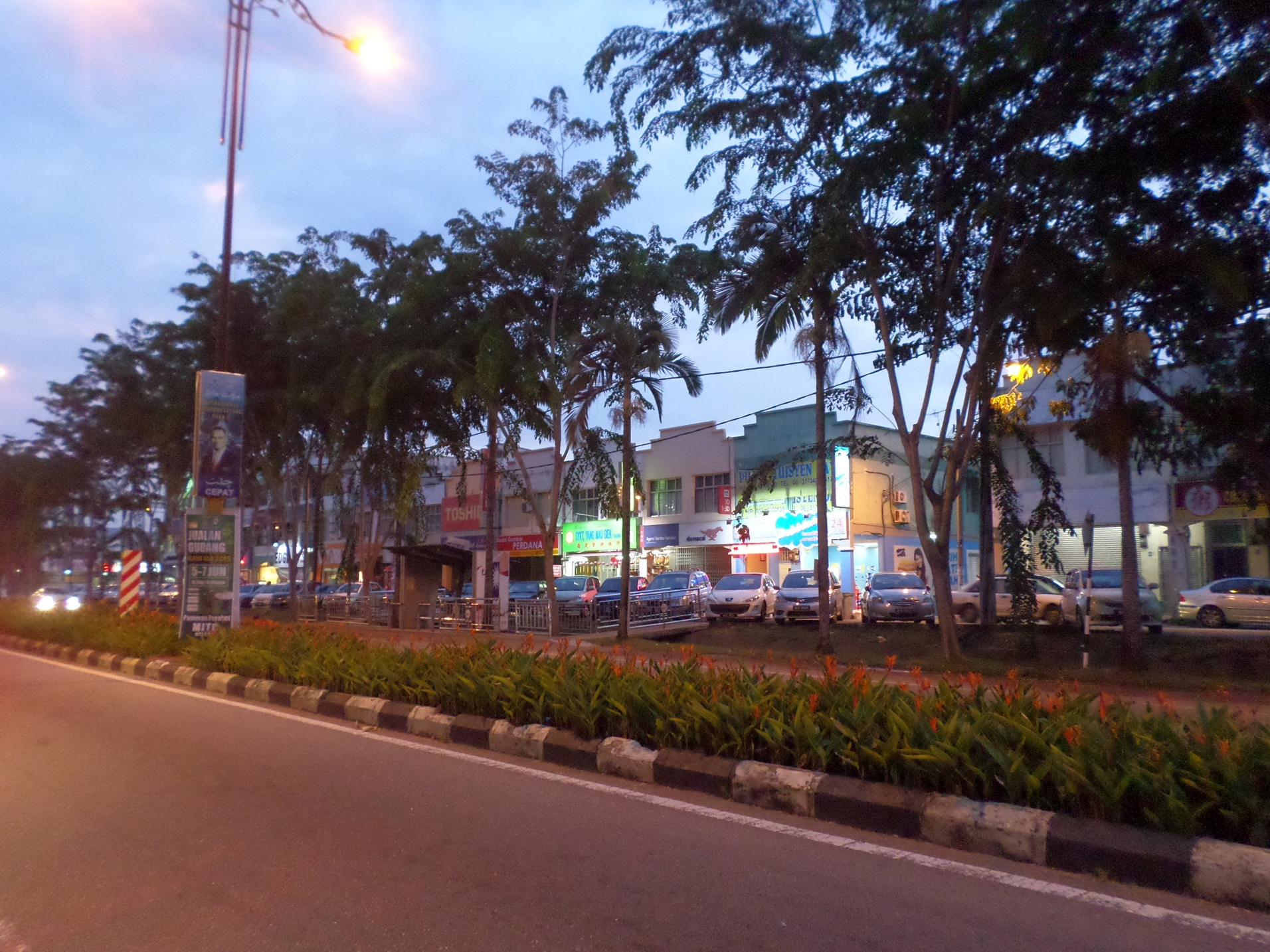
- View of shophouses on Taman Melaka Baru side along Jalan Tunku Abdul Rahman at dusk.
- Interactive map of Batu Berendam
- Coordinates: 02°15′00″N 102°15′00″E
- Country: Malaysia
- State: Malacca
- City/Town: Malacca City (South); Hang Tuah Jaya (North)
- District: Melaka Tengah

Area
  - Total: 13.4 km^{2} (5.2 sq mi)
- (Note: Including suburb (12.8 sq km) and the town area (0.6 sq km).)

Population (2020)
  - Total: 49,635
  - Density: 3,700/km^{2} (9,590/sq mi)
- (Note: Including 46,859 people in the suburb and 2,776 people in the town area.)
- Time zone: UTC+8 (MST)
- Postal code: 75350

Batu Berendam (translated as immersed rock) is a town and suburb of Malacca City in the Malaysian state of Malacca. Located 7 km north of the city centre, it is home to the state's principal airport – Malacca Airport which was built in 1952, as well as an eponymous free industrial zone built in 1973, which houses mostly overseas-based electronics factory including German company Infineon Technologies (formerly a semiconductor division of Siemens).

Until the 1970s, Batu Berendam was a relatively rural village, with rice farming being the main economic activity. Batu Berendam used to be accessible by train from Pulau Sebang like other towns along the Malacca River during the British colonial era, until the Imperial Japanese Army dismantled the railway track during World War II, part of which ran through what is now the airport runway.

In 1990, Batu Berendam became Malacca's premier aerospace manufacturing hub, when Composites Technology Research Malaysia (now CTRM Holdings Sdn Bhd) set up a factory on the west side of Malacca Airport to produce Eagle light aircraft. However, production of these aircraft ceased in 2005 due to low demands, and it shifted its focus towards producing components for Airbus, Boeing and Embraer aircraft.

== Climate ==
Climate data for Batu Berendam
Month	Jan	Feb	Mar	Apr	May	Jun	Jul	Aug	Sep	Oct	Nov	Dec	Year
Mean daily maximum °C (°F)	31 (88)	32 (90)	32 (90)	32 (90)	31 (88)	31 (88)	30 (86)	30 (86)	30 (86)	31 (88)	30 (86)	30 (86)	30 (86)
Mean daily minimum °C (°F)	22 (72)	22 (72)	23 (73)	23 (73)	23 (73)	23 (73)	22 (72)	22 (72)	22 (72)	23 (73)	22 (72)	22 (72)	22 (72)
Average precipitation mm (inches)	89 (3.5)	92 (3.6)	156 (6.1)	181 (7.1)	179 (7.0)	178 (7.0)	194 (7.6)	187 (7.4)	202 (8.0)	226 (8.9)	228 (9.0)	153 (6.0)	2,064 (81.3)
Source: Weatherbase

== Place of Worship ==
Mosque: Masjid Al-Hidayah Batu Berendam

Buddhist temple:

- Wat Phra Buddha Jinaraja
- Taiwan Buddhist Tzu Chi Foundation Malaysia (Malacca Branch)

Chinese temple:

- Ling Yun Ting Temple (灵云亭)
- Wu Sheng Dì Jun Temple (武聖帝君壇)
- Hian Seng Keong Temple (新马六甲花园玄聖宫)

Hindu temple: Sri Subramaniar Devasthanam Temple

Cemetery: Bukit Jelutong Chinese Cemetery

== Education ==
Primary schools

- Batu Berendam National School
- Batu Berendam 2 National School
- Wen Hua National Type Chinese Primary School

High schools

- Munshi Abdullah National Secondary School
- Tun Mutahir National Secondary School
- Sultan Muhammad National Religious Secondary School

Malacca Industrial Skills Development and Entrepreneur Centre (MISDEC) is a non-profit institute located at the Batu Berendam Industrial Park that focuses on training in the fields of Mechatronic Engineering, Halal, Business and Artificial Intelligence.

== Industrial areas ==
- Batu Berendam Free Industrial Zone

== Gallery ==
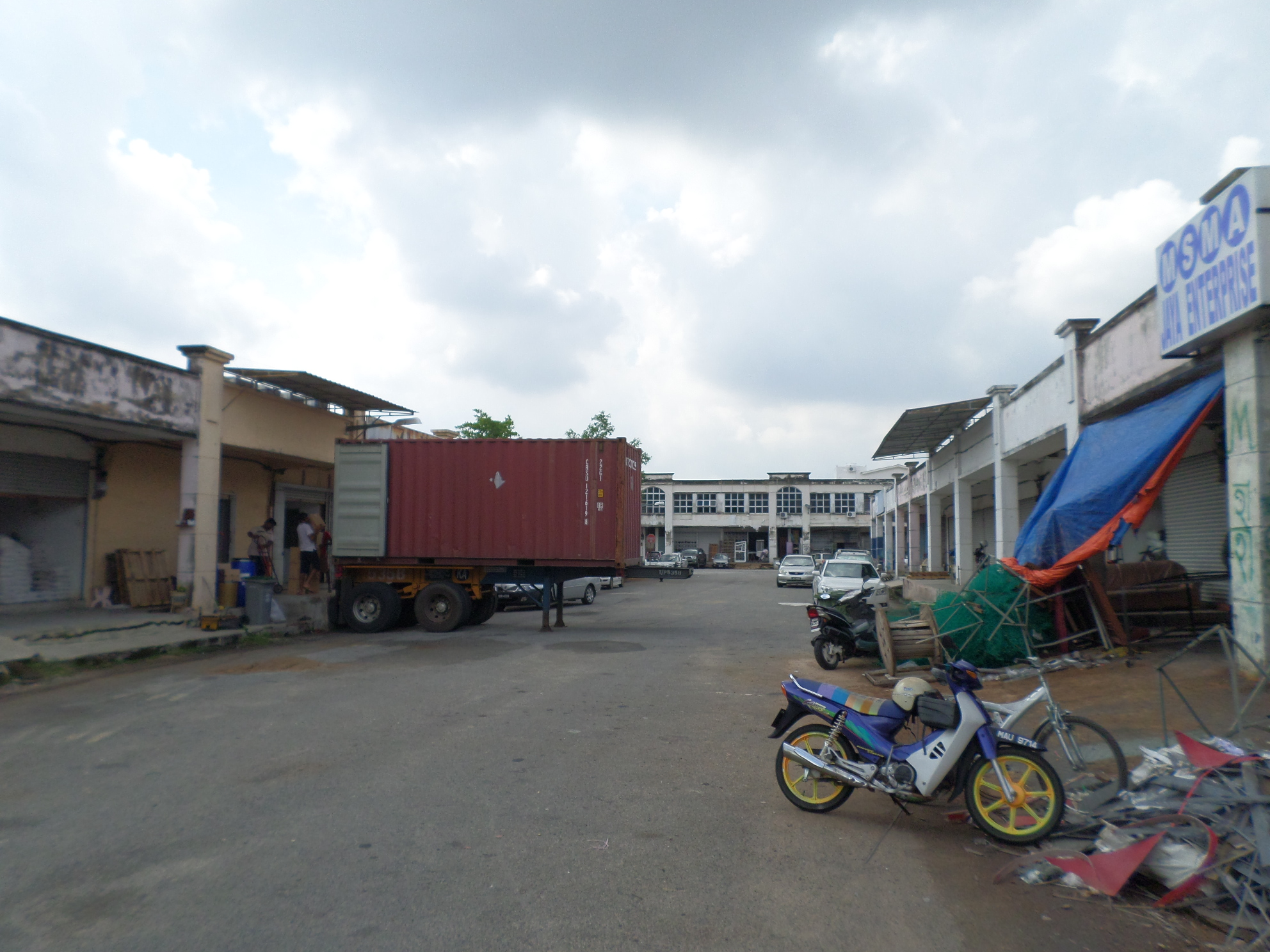
Batu Berendam Industrial Area

== See also ==
- List of cities and towns in Malaysia by population
