= Malacca State Route M10 =

Road in Malaysia

Melaka Route 10
- Jalan Simpang Ampat

Major junctions
- West end: Kampung Pengkalan Paoh
- FT 5 Federal Route 5 FT 19 AMJ Highway; FT 61 Federal Route 61; M131 Jalan Menggong
- East end: Kampung Hutan Percha

Location
- Country: Malaysia
- Primary destinations: Lubuk China, Brisu, Simpang Ampat, Alor Gajah, Pulau Sebang, Tampin, Batang Melaka

Highway system
- Highways in Malaysia; Expressways; Federal; State

Jalan Simpang Ampat, Malacca State Route M10 is a major road in Malacca, Malaysia. It is also a main route to A' Famosa Resort.

== Junction lists ==
The entire route is located in Alor Gajah District, Malacca.

Legend:

- I/C - Interchange, I/S - Intersection, RSA - Rest and service area, OBR - Overhead bridge restaurant, R/R - Restaurant and rest plaza, L/B - Layby, V/P - Vista point, TN - tunnel, T/P - Toll plaza, BR - Bridge
- C - Cloverleaf, S - Stack, T-A - Trumpet-A, T-B - Trumpet-B, DT - Directional-T/Y, SDT - Semi-Directional-T/Y, P-Y - Partial-Y, D - Diamond, P-C - Partial cloverleaf, D-D - Diverging diamond, D-R - Direct ramp

| Location | km | mi | Name | Destinations | Notes |
|---|---|---|---|---|---|
| Lubuk China | | | Lubuk China; Kampung Pengkalan Paoh | FT 5 Malaysia Federal Route 5 – Port Dickson, Linggi, Masjid Tanah, Malacca City | Roundabout |
| Lubuk China | | | Jalan Titian Bintagor | Jalan Titian Bintagor – Kampung Titian Bintagor | T-junctions |
| Lubuk China | | | Kampung Sungai Jernih | | Junctions |
| Lubuk China | | | Lubuk China | | |
| Lubuk China | | | Kampung Gaung Keladi | | |
| Lubuk China | | | Kampung Sungai Siput | | |
| Lubuk China | | | Kampung Lubuk Buntar | | |
| Lubuk China | | | Sungai Siput bridge | | |
| Lubuk China | | | Kampung Lendu | | |
| Lubuk China | | | Brisu | M155 Jalan Kampung Ayer Limau – Masjid Tanah | T-junctions |
| Simpang Ampat | | | Jalan Padang Kambing | M153 Jalan Padang Kambing – Ayer Paabas, Melekek, Lendu, Alor Gajah | T-junctions |
| Simpang Ampat | | | Kampung Sungai Buloh | | |
| Simpang Ampat | | | Kampung Lubuk Kepong | | |
| Simpang Ampat | | | Taman Rumah Awam | | |
| Simpang Ampat | | | Simpang Ampat | FT 19 AMJ Highway – Seremban, Rembau, Alor Gajah, Malacca; North–South Expressway Southern Route / AH2 – Kuala Lumpur, Johor Bahru | Junctions |
| A' Famosa Resort | | | A' Famosa Resort Entrance 1 | A' Famosa Resort – A' Famosa Golf and Country Club, A' Famosa Waterworld, Cowboy Town, A' Famosa Animal World Safari, Bukit PM | T-junctions |
| A' Famosa Resort | | | A' Famosa Resort Entrance 2 | A' Famosa Resort – Villas | T-junctions |
| Pulau Sebang | | | Pulau Sebang | FT 61 Malaysia Federal Route 61 – Tampin, Gemencheh, Gemas, Segamat, Alor Gajah, Malacca | Junctions |
| Pulau Sebang | | | Kampung Arongan | Jalan Kubang Gajah – Kampung Kubang Gajah | T-junctions |
| Kemuning | | | Jalan Kemuning | M135 Jalan Kemuning – Kemuning, Gadek | T-junctions |
| Kemuning | | | Kampung Hutan Percha | M131 Jalan Menggong – Batang Melaka, Gemencheh, Gemas, Segamat, Selandar, Alor Gajah, Nyalas | T-junctions |
1.000 mi = 1.609 km; 1.000 km = 0.621 mi
