= Malacca State Route M8 =

Melaka Route 8
- Jalan Alor Gajah–Nyalas
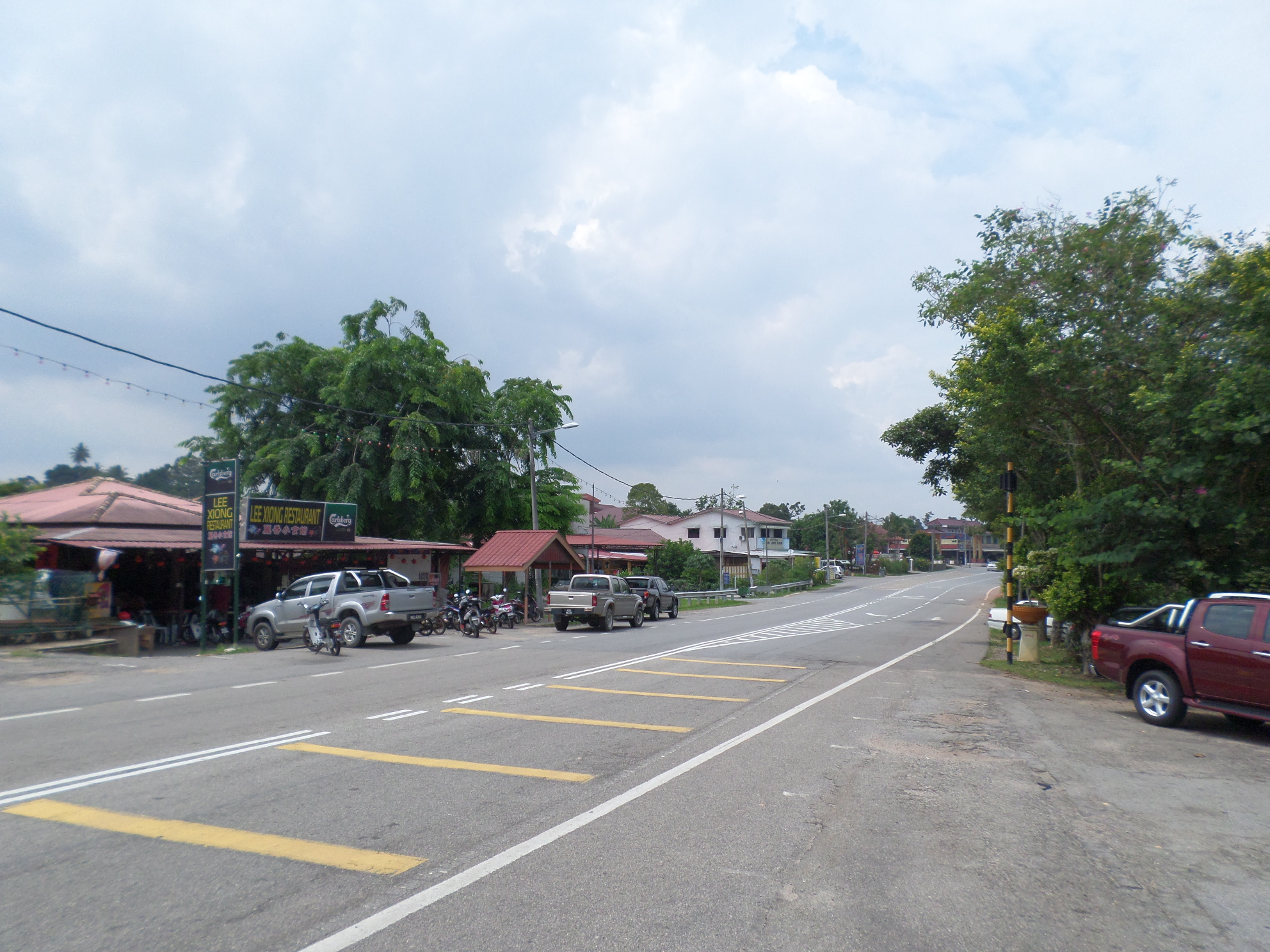
- State Route M8 crossing through Machap Baru

Major junctions
- West end: Alor Gajah
- FT 139 Federal Route 139; FT 191 Jalan Lama Alor Gajah; FT 19 AMJ Highway; M17 Jalan Pengkalan; M131 Jalan Bukit Bulat; M147 Jalan Bukit Tambun; M19 State Route M19; M13 Jalan Dangi–Kesang Pajak; M129 Jalan Jasin–Selandar; M120 Jalan Kampung Jus; M15 Jalan Nyalas
- East end: Nyalas

Location
- Country: Malaysia
- Primary destinations: Seri Pengkalan, Lesong Batu, Machap Umboo, Machap Baru, Ayer Pasir, Selandar, Bukit Senggeh, Gapis

Highway system
- Highways in Malaysia; Expressways; Federal; State

Malacca State Route M8, Jalan Alor Gajah–Nyalas, Jalan Gapis, is a state road in Malacca, Malaysia. The Kilometre Zero of the State Route M8 starts at Jalan Lama Alor Gajah intersections.

== History ==
Malacca State Route M8 on Masjid Tanah–Lendu–Alor Gajah side was recommissioned as Federal Route 139.

== Features ==
=== Overlaps ===
- M19 Malacca State Route M19 – Simpang Gading–Ayer Pasir

== Junction lists ==
The entire route is located in Malacca.

Legend:

- I/C - Interchange, I/S - Intersection, RSA - Rest and service area, OBR - Overhead bridge restaurant, R/R - Restaurant and rest plaza, L/B - Layby, V/P - Vista point, TN - tunnel, T/P - Toll plaza, BR - Bridge
- C - Cloverleaf, S - Stack, T-A - Trumpet-A, T-B - Trumpet-B, DT - Directional-T/Y, SDT - Semi-Directional-T/Y, P-Y - Partial-Y, D - Diamond, P-C - Partial cloverleaf, D-D - Diverging diamond, D-R - Direct ramp

District	Location	km	mi	Name	Destinations	Notes
Alor Gajah	Alor Gajah			Through to FT 139 Malaysia Federal Route 139		
Alor Gajah	Alor Gajah			Alor Gajah	FT 191 Jalan Lama Alor Gajah – Town Centre, Tampin, Malacca City	Junctions
Alor Gajah	Alor Gajah			AMJ Highway	FT 19 AMJ Highway – Seremban, Rembau, Tampin, Gemas, Segamat, Malacca City, Muar, Batu Pahat; North–South Expressway Southern Route / AH2 – Kuala Lumpur, Johor Bahru	Junctions
Alor Gajah	Alor Gajah			Malacca River bridge		
Alor Gajah	Seri Pengkalan			Seri Pengkalan	M17 Jalan Pengkalan – Alor Gajah, Tampin, Durian Tunggal, Jasin, Malacca City	Junctions
Alor Gajah	Seri Pengkalan			Seri Pengkalan	Jalan Pengkalan Indah 2 1 – Taman Pengkalan Indah; Jalan Samarinda – Taman Samarinda, Taman Seri Sutera; Jalan Melaka Perdana Utama – Taman Melaka Perdana	Multiple T-junctions
Alor Gajah	Lesong Batu			Lesong Batu	Jalan Lesong Batu Jaya – Royal Malaysia Police Alor Gajah District Headquarters	T-junctions
Alor Gajah	Lesong Batu			Lesung Batu Emas	Jalan Lesung Batu Emas Utama – Lesung Batu Emas	T-junctions
Alor Gajah	Machap Umboo			Taman Seri Manggis	Jalan SM 1 – Taman Seri Manggis	T-junctions
Alor Gajah	Machap Umboo			Machap Umboo	Jalan Sekolah – SJK (C) Machap Umboo	T-junctions
Alor Gajah	Machap Umboo			Kampung Permai	Jalan Utama Kampung Permai – Kampung Permai	T-junctions
Alor Gajah	Machap			Machap	M131 Jalan Bukit Bulat – Machap Bukit Bulat, Menggong, Hutan Percha	T-junctions
Alor Gajah	Machap			Machap	M147 Jalan Bukit Tambun – Durian Tunggal, Malacca City	T-junctions
Alor Gajah	Machap Baru			Machap Baru	Jalan Sekolah – SJK (C) Machap Baru	T-junctions
Alor Gajah	Machap Baru			Machap Baru	Jalan Balai – Machap Baru New Village	T-junctions
Alor Gajah	Machap Baru			Jalan Simpang Gading	M19 Jalan Simpang Gading – Durian Tunggal, Malacca City	Western terminus of concurrency with M19
Alor Gajah	Ayer Pasir			Ayer Pasir	M19 Jalan Tebong – Kuala Sungga, Tebong	Eastern terminus of concurrency with M19
Alor Gajah	Ayer Pasir			Bukit Sedanan (West)	Jalan Kampung Baru Bukit Sedanan – Kampung Baru Bukit Sedanan	T-junctions
Jasin	Selandar			Bukit Sedanan (East)	Jalan Kampung Baru Bukit Sedanan – Kampung Baru Bukit Sedanan	T-junctions
Jasin	Selandar			Selandar	Jalan Kampung Baru – Kampung Baru Selandar	T-junctions
Jasin	Selandar			Selandar; Jalan Dangi–Kesang Pajak	M13 Jalan Dangi–Kesang Pajak – Gemenceh, Batang Melaka, Kesang Pajak, Jasin	Roundabout
Jasin	Selandar			Taman Selandar Indah	Jalan Indah 1 – Taman Selandar Indah	T-junctions
Jasin	Selandar			Jalan Jasin–Selandar	M129 Jalan Jasin–Selandar – Gemenceh, Batang Melaka, Kesang Pajak, Jasin, Simpang Bekoh, Asahan, Jementah	T-junctions
Jasin	Bukit Senggeh			Taman Bukit Senggeh		
Jasin	Bukit Senggeh			Kampung Bukit Senggeh	Jalan Kampung Bukit Senggeh – Kampung Bukit Senggeh	T-junctions
Jasin	Bukit Senggeh			Kampung Jus	M120 Jalan Kampung Jus – Kampung Jus	T-junctions
Jasin	Gapis			Kampung Gapis		
Jasin	Gapis			Gapis River Bridge		
Jasin	Gapis			Bukit Mempelam		
Jasin	Nyalas			Kampung Mantai		
Jasin	Nyalas			Taman Nyalas Baru	Jalan Nyalas Baru 5 – Taman Nyalas Baru, SJK (C) Toon Hua	T-junctions
Jasin	Nyalas			Nyalas	M15 Jalan Nyalas – Air Kuning Selatan, Gemas, Segamat, Asahan, Simpang Bekoh, Tangkak, Jementah, Jasin, Malacca City; M167 Jalan FELDA Bukit Senggeh – FELDA Bukit Senggeh, Jasin, Bemban, Malacca City	T-junctions
1.000 mi = 1.609 km; 1.000 km = 0.621 mi: Concurrency terminus; Route transition
