= AMJ Highway =

Road in Malaysia

Federal Route 19 and 5
- Lebuh AMJ (Alor Gajah–Central Malacca–Jasin Highway)

Route information
- Maintained by Malaysian Public Works Department
- Existed: 2001–present
- History: Completed in 2007

Major junctions
- Northwest end: Bulatan Taboh Naning, Malacca
- North–South Expressway Southern Route / AH2; FT 191 Jalan Lama Alor Gajah; FT 61 Federal Route 61; FT 139 Federal Route 139; FT 19 Jalan Taboh Naning; FT 142 Federal Route 142; FT 140 Federal Route 140; FT 33 SPA Highway; FT 144 Federal Route 144; FT 264 Federal Route 264; FT 5 Federal Route 5 FT 23 Federal Route 23; FT 224 Muar Bypass
- Southeast end: Parit Bunga, Tangkak, Johor

Location
- Country: Malaysia
- Primary destinations: Simpang Ampat, Tampin, Alor Gajah, Batu Berendam, Malacca Town, Umbai, Merlimau

Highway system
- Highways in Malaysia; Expressways; Federal; State

Lebuhraya Alor Gajah–Melaka Tengah–Jasin (Alor Gajah–Central Malacca–Jasin Highway), or popularly known as Lebuh AMJ (Alor Gajah–Central Malacca (Malacca)–Jasin), Federal Routes 19 (Malaccan side) and 5 (Johorean side) is a divided highway across Malacca state, Malaysia.

== Route background ==
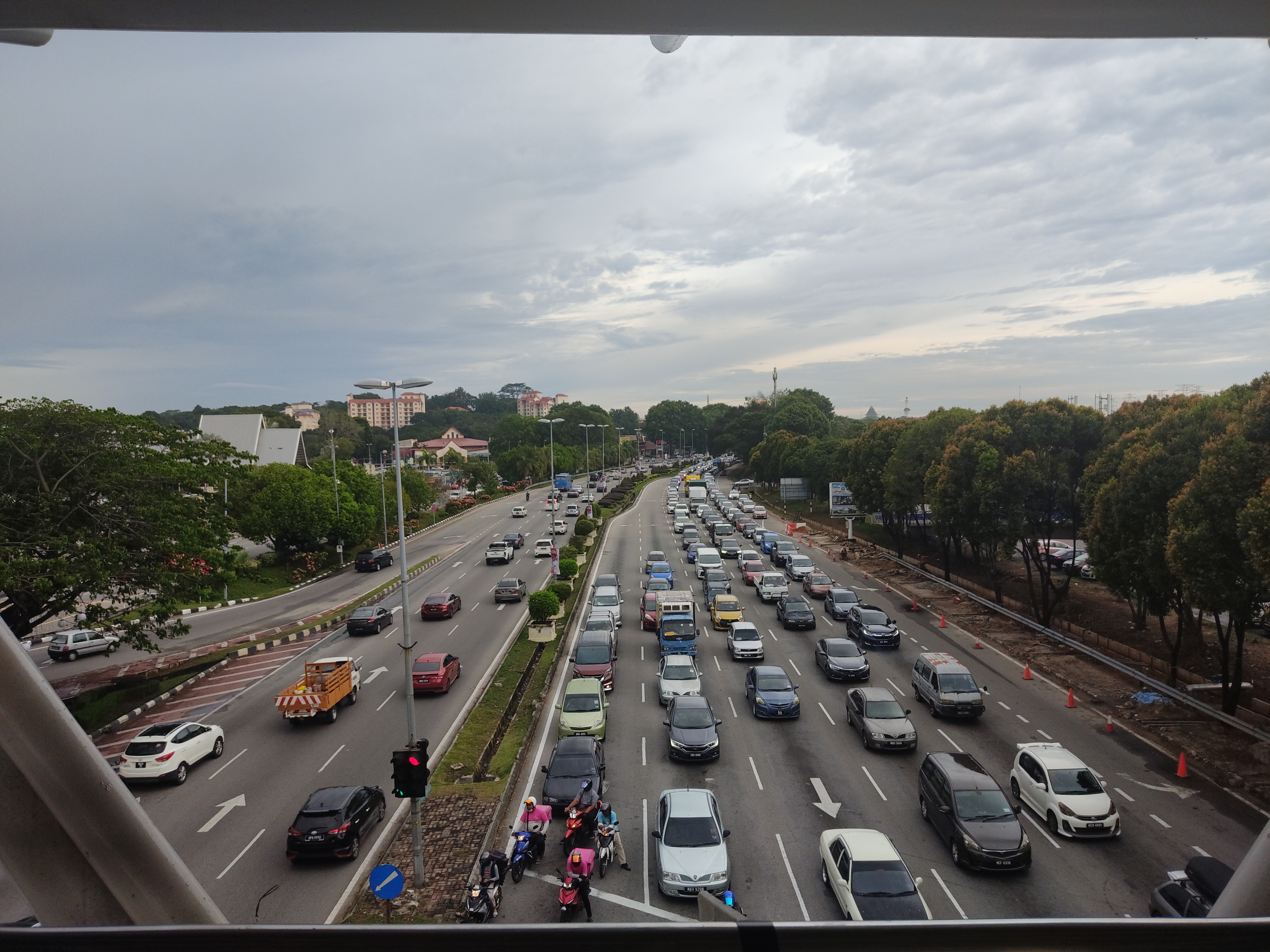
AMJ Highway section in Melaka Sentral

Generally, the Lebuh AMJ runs north–south from Simpang Ampat to Malacca City before running from west–east from Malacca City to Muar. The entire Malaccan section of the Lebuh AMJ is signed as Federal Route 19, while the Johorean section of the highway is signed as Federal Route 5. The route numbers overlap along the section between Sungai Duyong Intersection to Semabok Interchange. Meanwhile, the section between Malim and Semabok was signed as Federal Route 191 but was decommissioned in 2012 when the entire Lebuh AMJ was gazetted as FT19.

The Kilometre Zero of the Federal Route 19 used to be located at Jalan Hang Tuah-Jalan Kubu intersection in Malacca City. After the Lebuh AMJ was gazetted as the Federal Route 19 in 2012, the Kilometre Zero was moved to Jalan Lama Kesang Intersection at Kesang, Johor.

== History ==
Lebuh AMJ was constructed due to the traffic congestion along the former Federal Routes 19 (Malacca–Simpang Ampat) and 5 (Malacca–Muar). The Simpang Ampat–Malim section of the highway was constructed as an upgrade of the existing Federal Route 19 route, while the Sungai Duyong–Kesang section of the highway was built as an entirely new route. The project was started from 2001 and was completed in 2007 with the total cost of RM505 million. Three interchanges were built along the highway, namely Semabok Interchange, Al Azim Interchange and Malim Jaya Interchange. The entire Lebuh AMJ was opened to traffic on 29 June 2007.

The Lebuh AMJ is notorious for having many unattended cows being left roaming along the Sungai Duyong–Kesang section, posing risks of accidents to motorists. To reduce accidents caused by the unattended cows, the state government of Malacca proposed safety measures such as street lights, high-mast lighting and fences to be installed along the section, which would cost RM5 million.

On 19 October 2024, a project to construct an overpass of 5 kilometres from Pulau Gadong to Taman Cheng Perdana crossing six signal-controlled intersections on the highway was approved for appropriation in 2025 Malaysian federal budget.

== Features ==
There are five Rest and Service Area (RSA) along Lebuh AMJ: two at Sungai Rambai, one at Paya Rumput, one at Rembia and one at Melekek.

At most sections, the Lebuh AMJ was built under the JKR R5 road standard as a dual-carriageway highway with partial access control, allowing maximum speed limit of up to 90 km/h. This highway also features fast lane-to-slow lane U-turns.

Overlaps: Semabok–Duyong, Kesang–Muar (overlaps with route 5)

There are no alternate routes or sections with motorcycle lanes.

== Junction lists ==
Legend:

- I/C - Interchange, I/S - Intersection, RSA - Rest and service area, OBR - Overhead bridge restaurant, R/R - Restaurant and rest plaza, L/B - Layby, V/P - Vista point, TN - tunnel, T/P - Toll plaza, BR - Bridge
- C - Cloverleaf, S - Stack, T-A - Trumpet-A, T-B - Trumpet-B, DT - Directional-T/Y, SDT - Semi-Directional-T/Y, P-Y - Partial-Y, D - Diamond, P-C - Partial cloverleaf, D-D - Diverging diamond, D-R - Direct ramp

State	District	km	Exit	Name	Destinations	Notes
Through to FT 224 Muar Bypass
Johor	Tangkak		39	Parit Bunga I/C	FT 5 Jalan Kesang – Tanjung Agas, Bandar Maharani Bandar Diraja (Muar) town centre FT 23 Jalan Segamat–Muar – Segamat, Jementah, Tangkak, Gunung Ledang, Bukit Gambir; North–South Expressway Southern Route / AH2 – Kuala Lumpur, Johor Bahru	Southern terminus as FT5
Johor	Tangkak			Parit Ismail		
Johor	Tangkak		BR	Parit Ismail bridge		
Johor	Tangkak			Parit Ismail elevated U-turn	U-turn – Tanjung Agas, Bandar Maharani Bandar Diraja (Muar) town centre	
Johor	Tangkak		BR	Parit Karang bridge		
Johor	Tangkak			Parit Karang		
Johor	Tangkak			JPJ Enforcement Station		Muar bound
Johor	Tangkak		BR	Parit Kemang bridge		
Johor	Tangkak		38	Kesang Laut I/S	J134 Jalan Kesang Laut – Kesang Laut	Malacca bound
Johor	Tangkak			U-turn		Southbound
Johor	Tangkak		37	Kesang I/S	FT 5 Jalan Melaka–Muar – Sungai Rambai, Merlimau, Sebatu	Northern terminus as FT5; Southern terminus as FT19
Johor–Malacca border			BR	Sungai Kesang bridge		
Malacca	Jasin		RSA	Sungai Rambai recreational area	Sungai Rambai recreational area -	Westbound
Malacca	Jasin		36	Sungai Rambai I/S	M14 Jalan Merlimau Darat – Parit Perawas, Sungai Mati, Sungai Rambai	Westbound
Malacca	Jasin		RSA	Sungai Rambai RSA	Sungai Rambai RSA -	Eastbound
Malacca	Jasin		RSA	Sungai Rambai RSA	Sungai Rambai RSA -	Westbound
Malacca	Jasin		35	Parit Putat I/S	M19 Jalan Parit Putat – Kampung Gadong, Sungai Rambai	
Malacca	Jasin		BR	Parit Putat bridge		
Malacca	Jasin			U-turn		Both bounds
Malacca	Jasin		BR	Parit Sebatu bridge		
Malacca	Jasin		34A 34B	Sebatu I/S	M117 Jalan Permatang Tulang – Kampung Gadong, Sebatu, Permatang Tulang	
Malacca	Jasin			U-turn		Both bounds
Malacca	Jasin		33	Batu Gajah I/S	M14 Jalan Merlimau Darat – Batu Gajah, Merlimau Pasir	
Malacca	Jasin		32	Merlimau (North) I/S	M25 Jalan Merlimau–Jasin – Jasin, Merlimau	
Malacca	Jasin			U-turn		Both bounds
Malacca	Jasin		31	Tiang Dua I/S	M109 Jalan Tiang Dua – Buloh Lang, Batu Akar, Tiang Dua, Bemban, Jasin, Serkam	
Malacca	Jasin			U-turn		Both bounds
Malacca	Central Malacca		30	Umbai (North) I/S	M105 Jalan Paya Dalam – Paya Dalam, Tiang Dua, Umbai	
Malacca	Central Malacca		BR	Sungai Umbai bridge		
Malacca	Central Malacca			U-turn		Both bounds
Malacca	Central Malacca		BR	Sungai Punggor bridge		
Malacca	Central Malacca		29A 29B	Sempang Bugis I/S	M103 Jalan Sempang Bugis – Kampung Bukit Batu, Kampung Balik Bukit, Sempang Bugis, Telok Mas, Padang Temu, Bandar Hilir, Henry Gurney Prisoners School	
Malacca	Central Malacca			U-turn		Both bounds
Malacca	Central Malacca		BR	Jalan Balik Bukit overpass		
Malacca	Central Malacca		28	Kandang I/S	FT 144 Jalan Kandang – Jasin, Kandang	
Malacca	Central Malacca		BR	Sungai Duyong bridge		
Malacca	Central Malacca		27	Duyong I/S	FT 5 Jalan Melaka–Muar – Kandang, Umbai, Serkam	Overlaps with FT5
Malacca	Central Malacca		26	Duyong-Bukit Katil I/S	FT 264 Jalan Duyong–Bukit Katil – Ayer Keroh, Bukit Katil	Overlaps with FT5
Malacca	Central Malacca		25	Semabok I/C	FT 5 Jalan Semabok – Malacca City Centre, Bandar Hilir, Historical Places of Malacca (UNESCO World Heritage Sites)	Overlaps with FT5
Malacca	Central Malacca			Taman Semabok		
Malacca	Central Malacca		24	Bukit Piatu I/S	Jalan Bukit Piatu – Bukit Piatu, Bukit Baru, Bandar Hilir, Malacca City Centre, Historical Places of Malacca (UNESCO World Heritage Sites)	
Malacca	Central Malacca		23A	Bukit Baru I/S	Jalan Bukit Baru – Bukit Baru, Malacca General Hospital	
Malacca	Central Malacca		23	Al-Azim I/C	FT 142 Jalan Mufti Haji Khalil – Batu Berendam, Ayer Keroh, Malacca International Airport(MIA), Malacca General Hospital; FT 142 Jalan Taming Sari – Malacca City Centre, Historical Places of Malacca (UNESCO World Heritage Sites)	
Malacca	Central Malacca			Pringgit		
Malacca	Central Malacca			Malacca Sentral		
Malacca	Central Malacca		22	Malacca Sentral I/S	Jalan Melaka Sentral – Melaka Sentral; Jalan Panglima Awang – Malacca City Centre, Historical Places of Malacca (UNESCO World Heritage Sites)	
Malacca	Central Malacca			Tesco Malacca		
Malacca	Central Malacca		BR	Malacca River bridge		
Malacca	Central Malacca		21	Bachang I/S	M2 Jalan Bachang – Bachang, Malacca City Centre, Historical Places of Malacca (UNESCO World Heritage Sites)	
Malacca	Central Malacca		20	Kesidang I/S	M3 Jalan Datuk Wira Poh Ah Tiam – Tengkera(Tranquerah), Klebang Beach; FT 19 Jalan Tun Perak – Malacca City Centre, Historical Places of Malacca (UNESCO World Heritage Sites)	
Malacca	Central Malacca		19	Malim Jaya I/C	Jalan Malim Jaya – Malim Jaya	
Malacca	Central Malacca		18	Pokok Mangga I/S	M5 Jalan Pokok Mangga – Pokok Mangga	
Malacca	Central Malacca			Taman ASEAN		LILO
Malacca	Central Malacca		BR	Sungai Bertam (Malim River) bridge		
Malacca	Central Malacca			Kampung Bertam		
Malacca	Central Malacca		17	Pulau Gadong I/S	M7 Jalan Pulau Gadong – Pulau Gadong, Tanjong Kling, Batu Berendam, Malacca International Airport	
Malacca	Central Malacca		16B	Batu Berendam Industrial Area I/S	M128 Jalan Dato' Mohd Zin – Batu Berendam, Batu Berendam Industrial Park, Malacca International Airport	
Malacca	Central Malacca		16A	Bukit Cheng I/S	M133 Jalan Bukit Cheng – Kampung Bukit Cheng	
Malacca	Central Malacca			Kampung Cheng		
Malacca	Central Malacca		15	Jalan Tangga Batu I/S	FT 140 Jalan Tangga Batu – Bukit Rambai, Tangga Batu	
Malacca	Central Malacca		14	Cheng I/S	Taman Cheng Baru, Cheng Perdana (Eden Heights), Taman Bukit Cheng	
Malacca	Central Malacca		13	SPA Highway I/C	FT 33 SPA Highway – Sungei Udang, Sungai Udang Prison, Terendak Camp, Commander Camp, Masjid Tanah, Port Dickson, Krubong, Ayer Keroh	
Malacca	Central Malacca		RSA	Paya Rumput RSA	Paya Rumput RSA -	Northbound
Malacca	Central Malacca		BR	Sungai Paya Rumput bridge		
Malacca	Central Malacca		12	Paya Rumput I/S	FT 19 Malacca–Alor Gajah old road – Kampung Paya Rumput	
Malacca	Central Malacca			Kampung Solok Haji Dollah		
Malacca	Alor Gajah		11	Zarina Industrial Area I/S	Zarina Industrial Area	
Malacca	Alor Gajah		10	Rembia I/S	M145 Jalan Lendu – Lendu, Masjid Tanah, Kampung Kemian	
Malacca	Alor Gajah		BR	Sungai Rembia bridge		
Malacca	Alor Gajah		RSA	Rembia RSA	Rembia RSA -	Northbound
Malacca	Alor Gajah		9	Gajah Mati I/S	FT 191 Jalan Dato' Dol Said – Alor Gajah, Kelemak	
Malacca	Alor Gajah		8	Seri Pengkalan I/S	M8 Malacca State Route M8 – Machap, Selandar, Nyalas; FT 139 Malaysia Federal Route 139 – Masjid Tanah, Lendu	
Malacca	Alor Gajah		7	Jelatang I/S	M17 Jalan Alor Gajah Lama – Alor Gajah, Durian Tunggal	
Malacca	Alor Gajah		6	Datuk Seri Mohd Zin I/S (Pengkalan I/S)	FT 61 Jalan Datuk Mohd Zin – Tampin, Gemencheh, Gemas, Segamat	
Malacca	Alor Gajah		5	Paya Datuk I/S	FT 191 Jalan Datuk Naning – Alor Gajah, Hospital Alor Gajah	
Malacca	Alor Gajah		4	Melekek I/S	M132 Jalan Paya Dalam – Ayer Pa'abas, Lendu	
Malacca	Alor Gajah			Kampung Paya Datuk		
Malacca	Alor Gajah			Kampung Solok Sinda		
Malacca	Alor Gajah		3	Pegoh Industrial Estate I/S	Jalan Kawasan Perindustrian Pegoh – Pegoh Industrial Estate, Honda Car Assembly Plant	
Malacca	Alor Gajah			Kampung Batang Melekek		
Malacca	Alor Gajah			Kampung Pereling		
Malacca	Alor Gajah		RSA	Melekek RSA	Melekek RSA -	Northbound
Malacca	Alor Gajah		2	Simpang Ampat I/S	M10 Jalan Lubok China–Kemus–Pulau Sebang – Lubok China, Brisu, Linggi, Pulau Sebang, A Famosa Resort, Hutan Percha	
Malacca	Alor Gajah		L/B	Simpang Ampat Craft L/B		Northbound
Malacca	Alor Gajah		1	Taboh Naning Roundabout	North–South Expressway Southern Route / AH2 – Kuala Lumpur, Seremban, Pedas/Linggi, Malacca, Johor Bahru	3-way roundabout
Through to FT 19 Jalan Taboh Naning
