= Malaysia Federal Route 139 =

Road in Malaysia

Federal Route 139

Route information
- Maintained by Malaysian Public Works Department
- Length: 13.10 km (8.14 mi)

Major junctions
- West end: Masjid Tanah
- FT 5 Federal Route 5 M155 Jalan Kampung Ayer Limau; M158 Jalan Ayer Paabas; M145 Jalan Lendu; FT 191 Jalan Lama Alor Gajah; FT 19 AMJ Highway; M8 State Route M8
- East end: Alor Gajah

Location
- Country: Malaysia
- Primary destinations: Lendu

Highway system
- Highways in Malaysia; Expressways; Federal; State

Federal Route 139 is a federal road in Malacca, Malaysia. This route was known as Malacca State Route M8 on Masjid Tanah–Lendu–Alor Gajah side before it was recommissioned as a federal road. The Kilometre Zero of the Federal Route 139 starts at Masjid Tanah.

== Features ==
At most sections, the Federal Route 139 was built under the JKR R5 road standard, allowing maximum speed limit of up to 90 km/h.

== Junction lists ==
The entire route is located in Alor Gajah District, Malacca.

Legend:

- I/C - Interchange, I/S - Intersection, RSA - Rest and service area, OBR - Overhead bridge restaurant, R/R - Restaurant and rest plaza, L/B - Layby, V/P - Vista point, TN - tunnel, T/P - Toll plaza, BR - Bridge
- C - Cloverleaf, S - Stack, T-A - Trumpet-A, T-B - Trumpet-B, DT - Directional-T/Y, SDT - Semi-Directional-T/Y, P-Y - Partial-Y, D - Diamond, P-C - Partial cloverleaf, D-D - Diverging diamond, D-R - Direct ramp

Location	km	mi	Name	Destinations	Notes
Masjid Tanah	0.0	0.0	Masjid Tanah	FT 5 Malaysia Federal Route 5 – Port Dickson, Linggi, Lubuk China, Londang, Sungai Udang, Malacca City, Tanjung Bidara, Malacca Matriculation Collage (KMM)	T-junctions
Masjid Tanah			Masjid Tanah; Masjid Pekan Masjid Tanah	Masjid Pekan Masjid Tanah (The origin of Masjid Tanah (Soil Mosque))	Historical site
Masjid Tanah			Sungai Baru bridge		
Masjid Tanah			Masjid Tanah; Taman Bandar Baru Utama Masjid Tanah	Jalan Taman Bandar Baru Utama – Taman Bandar Baru Utama Masjid Tanah; M155 Jalan Kampung Ayer Limau – Brisu, Lubuk China	Junctions
Masjid Tanah			Kampung Durian Daun		
Masjid Tanah			Kampung Solok Berangan		
Lendu			Lendu	M158 Jalan Ayer Paabas – Ayer Paabas	T-junctions
Lendu			Lendu	M145 Jalan Lendu – Kampung Kemian, Rembia	T-junctions
Alor Gajah			Sungai Siput bridge		
Alor Gajah			UiTM Malacca Campus	Universiti Teknologi MARA (UiTM) Malacca Campus	T-junctions
Alor Gajah			Taman Sutera Alor Gajah		
Alor Gajah	13.1	8.1	Alor Gajah; Kampung Ayer Udang	FT 191 Jalan Lama Alor Gajah – Town Centre, Tampin, Malacca City	Junctions
Alor Gajah			AMJ Highway	FT 19 AMJ Highway – Seremban, Rembau, Tampin, Malacca City, Muar, Batu Pahat; North–South Expressway Southern Route / AH2 – Kuala Lumpur, Johor Bahru	Junctions
Alor Gajah			Through to M8 Malacca State Route M8		
1.000 mi = 1.609 km; 1.000 km = 0.621 mi: Route transition
