= Malacca State Route M109 =

Road in Malaysia

Melaka Route 109
- Jalan Tiang Dua

Major junctions
- North end: Kampung Kesang
- M2 State Route M2; FT 144 Federal Route 144; FT 19 AMJ Highway; FT 5 Federal Route 5 M108 State Route M108
- South end: Serkam Pantai

Location
- Country: Malaysia
- Primary destinations: Bemban, Tiang Dua, Serkam

Highway system
- Highways in Malaysia; Expressways; Federal; State

Jalan Tiang Dua (Malacca State Route M109) is a major road in Malacca state, Malaysia.

== History ==
State Route M109 become one of the roads came with painted road marking, this initiative will reduces the risks of accident during night.

== Features ==
FT144 Malaysia Federal Route 144 (191.3 m) overlaps with State Route M109. No alternate routes or motorcycle lanes are available.

== Junction lists ==
The entire route is located in Jasin District, Malacca.

Legend:

- I/C - Interchange, I/S - Intersection, RSA - Rest and service area, OBR - Overhead bridge restaurant, R/R - Restaurant and rest plaza, L/B - Layby, V/P - Vista point, TN - tunnel, T/P - Toll plaza, BR - Bridge

Location	km	Name	Destinations	Notes
Serkam		Serkam Pantai	M108 Malacca State Route M108 – Umbai, Umbai Jetty (Ferry to Big Island), Merlimau; Serkam Pantai – Medan Ikan Bakar Serkam (Serkam's fish grill spot)	Junctions
Serkam		Serkam	FT 5 Malaysia Federal Route 5 – Alor Gajah, Malacca City, Umbai, Merlimau, Muar, Batu Pahat	Junctions
Serkam		Bukit Serkam	M109 Jalan Bukit Serkam – Malacca City, Alor Gajah, Umbai	T-junctions
Serkam		Taman Serkam Jaya		
Serkam		Kampung Batak		
Serkam		AMJ Highway	FT 19 AMJ Highway – Alor Gajah, Malacca Town, Muar, Batu Pahat	Junctions
Serkam		Jasin Scientex City	M109 Jalan Dato' Mulia – Jasin, Bukit Kepok; North–South Expressway Southern Route / AH2 – Kuala Lumpur, Johor Bahru	Roundabout
Tiang Dua		Tiang Dua	M102 Jalan Duyong–Tiang Dua – Tiang Dua, Duyong, Malacca City, Ayer Keroh; North–South Expressway Southern Route / AH2 – Kuala Lumpur, Johor Bahru	T-junctions
Tiang Dua		Botani Parkland City I/S	Jalan Jasin Selatan–Lipat Kajang – Botani Parkland City, Jasin Smart City; North–South Expressway Southern Route / AH2 – Kuala Lumpur, Johor Bahru; Jalan Bukit Kajang – Tehel, Ayer Molek, Malacca City	Roundabout
Bemban		Bemban	FT 144 Malaysia Federal Route 144 – Jasin, Nyalas, Kandang, Malacca City	Junctions; Overlap with FT144
Bemban		Jalan Gapam	M12 Jalan Gapam – Ayer Keroh; North–South Expressway Southern Route / AH2 – Kuala Lumpur, Johor Bahru	T-junctions
Bemban		Kampung Ayer Panas		
Kesang Tua		Golden Valley Golf and Country Club		
Kesang Tua		Kampung Kesang	M2 Jalan Durian Tunggal–Tangkak – Malacca City, Batu Berendam, Jasin, Tangkak	T-junctions
1.000 mi = 1.609 km; 1.000 km = 0.621 mi: Concurrency terminus
