= Malacca State Route M108 =

Road in Malaysia

Melaka Route 108

Major junctions
- Northwest end: Umbai
- FT 5 Federal Route 5 M109 State Route M109; M111 State Route M111; M110 State Route M110
- Southeast end: Merlimau

Location
- Country: Malaysia
- Primary destinations: Serkam Pantai, Sempang Pantai

Highway system
- Highways in Malaysia; Expressways; Federal; State

Malacca State Route M108, Jalan Serkam Pantai are a set of major roads in Malacca, Malaysia, Jalan in Malay means walk. This area has number of schools.

== Junction lists ==
The entire route is located in Jasin District, Malacca.

Legend:

- I/C - Interchange, I/S - Intersection, RSA - Rest and service area, OBR - Overhead bridge restaurant, R/R - Restaurant and rest plaza, L/B - Layby, V/P - Vista point, TN - tunnel, T/P - Toll plaza, BR - Bridge
- C - Cloverleaf, S - Stack, T-A - Trumpet-A, T-B - Trumpet-B, DT - Directional-T/Y, SDT - Semi-Directional-T/Y, P-Y - Partial-Y, D - Diamond, P-C - Partial cloverleaf, D-D - Diverging diamond, D-R - Direct ramp

Location	km	mi	Destinations	Notes
Umbai			FT 5 Malaysia Federal Route 5 – Malacca City, Alor Gajah, Jasin, Muar, Batu Pahat	T-junctions
Umbai			Jalan Jeti Anjung Batu – Umbai Ferry Terminal (Ferry to Pulau Besar)	T-junctions
Serkam Pantai			M109 Malacca State Route M109 – Tiang Dua, Bemban, Jasin, Medan Ikan Bakar; FT 5 Malaysia Federal Route 5 – Malacca City, Alor Gajah, Merlimau, Jasin, Muar, Batu Pahat; North–South Expressway Southern Route / AH2 – Kuala Lumpur, Johor Bahru	Junctions
Sempang Pantai			Kampung Sempang Pantai	T-junctions
Sempang Pantai			M111 Malacca State Route M111 – Sempang Pantai, Merlimau	T-junctions
Merlimau			Tun Teja Mausoleum	
Merlimau			Kampung Merlimau Pantai	
Merlimau			Penghulu Nattar's House	
Merlimau			M110 Malacca State Route M110; FT 5 Malaysia Federal Route 5 – Malacca City, Alor Gajah, Merlimau, Jasin, Muar, Batu Pahat; North–South Expressway Southern Route / AH2 – Kuala Lumpur, Johor Bahru	T-junctions
1.000 mi = 1.609 km; 1.000 km = 0.621 mi
