= Malaysia Federal Route 144 =

Road in Malaysia

Federal Route 144
- Jalan Kandang–Jasin–Chabau

Route information
- Length: 23.60 km (14.66 mi)

Major junctions
- South end: Kandang
- FT 5 Federal Route 5 FT 19 AMJ Highway; M102 Jalan Duyong–Tiang Dua; M144 Jalan Bukit Katil; M109 Jalan Tiang Dua; M2 Jalan Durian Tunggal-Tangkak; M15 Jalan Nyalas
- North end: Kampung Chabau

Location
- Country: Malaysia
- Primary destinations: Ayer Molek, Bemban, Ayer Merbau, Nyalas

Highway system
- Highways in Malaysia; Expressways; Federal; State

Federal Route 144, or Jalan Kandang–Jasin–Chabau (formerly Malacca State Route M27), is a federal road in Malacca state, Malaysia. The highway starts at Kandang.

== Features ==
Most sections of the Federal Route 144 were built under the JKR R5 road standard, allowing maximum speed limit of up to 90 km/h.

== Junction lists ==
The entire route is located in Malacca.

Legend:

- I/C - Interchange, I/S - Intersection, RSA - Rest and service area, OBR - Overhead bridge restaurant, R/R - Restaurant and rest plaza, L/B - Layby, V/P - Vista point, TN - tunnel, T/P - Toll plaza, BR - Bridge

District	Km	Exit	Name	Destinations	Notes
Central Malacca			Kandang	FT 5 Malaysia Federal Route 5 – Malacca City, Alor Gajah, Umbai, Merlimau, Muar	T-junctions
Central Malacca			AMJ Highway	FT 19 AMJ Highway – Malacca City, Alor Gajah, Merlimau, Muar	Junctions
Central Malacca			Kampung Bakar Batu		
Central Malacca			Kampung Permatang	M102 Jalan Duyong–Tiang Dua – Duyong, Hang Tuah's well, Tiang Dua	Junctions
Central Malacca			Ayer Molek		
Central Malacca			Kampung Pengkalan Minyak		
Central Malacca			Jalan Bukit Katil	M144 Jalan Bukit Katil – Bukit Katil, Ayer Keroh; North–South Expressway Southern Route / AH2 – Kuala Lumpur, Johor Bahru	T-junctions
Jasin			Jalan Tambak Paya	M165 Jalan Tambak Paya – Kampung Tambak Paya	T-junctions
Jasin			Jalan Kampung Tehel	M24 Jalan Kampung Tehel – Kampung Tehel, Kampung Tanjung Labuh	T-junctions
Jasin			Jalan Kampung Tehel	M24 Jalan Kampung Tehel – Kampung Tehel, Kampung Tanjung Labuh	T-junctions
Jasin			Bemban	M109 Jalan Tiang Dua – Ayer Panas, Tiang Dua, Serkam	Junctions
Jasin			Ayer Merbau		
Jasin			Jasin	M2 Jalan Durian Tunggal–Tangkak – Alor Gajah, Batu Berendam, Malacca City, Chin-Chin, Merlimau, Tangkak, Jementah, Segamat, Muar	Junctions
Through to M27 Jalan Jasin–Chabau
