= Jalan Dangi–Kesang Pajak =

Road in Malaysia

Malacca and Negeri Sembilan M13 and N13
- Jalan Dangi–Kesang Pajak

Major junctions
- North end: Dangi, Negeri Sembilan
- N17 Jalan Dangi; FT 1 Federal Route 1 N18 Jalan Batang Malacca; M8 State Route M8; M142 Jalan Durian Tunggal–Tangkak
- South end: Kesang Pajak, Malacca

Location
- Country: Malaysia
- Primary destinations: Gemencheh, Batang Melaka, Selandar

Highway system
- Highways in Malaysia; Expressways; Federal; State

Jalan Dangi–Kesang Pajak (Malacca State Route M13 or Negeri Sembilan State Route N13) is a major road in Malacca and Negeri Sembilan state, Malaysia.

== Junction lists ==
Legend:

- I/C - Interchange, I/S - Intersection, RSA - Rest and service area, OBR - Overhead bridge restaurant, R/R - Restaurant and rest plaza, L/B - Layby, V/P - Vista point, TN - tunnel, T/P - Toll plaza, BR - Bridge
- C - Cloverleaf, S - Stack, T-A - Trumpet-A, T-B - Trumpet-B, DT - Directional-T/Y, SDT - Semi-Directional-T/Y, P-Y - Partial-Y, D - Diamond, P-C - Partial cloverleaf, D-D - Diverging diamond, D-R - Direct ramp

State	District	Location	km	mi	Name	Destinations	Notes
Negeri Sembilan	Kuala Pilah	Dangi			Dangi	N17 Jalan Dangi – Johol, Rembau, Kampung Kepis, Rompin, Bahau	T-junctions
Negeri Sembilan	Jempol	Bahau					
Negeri Sembilan	Tampin	Gemencheh			Jalan Kampung Bukit Rokan	Jalan Kampung Bukit Rokan – Kampung Bukit Rokan	T-junctions
Negeri Sembilan	Tampin	Gemencheh			Gemencheh	FT 1 Malaysia Federal Route 1 – Seremban, Tampin, Gemas, Segamat	Junctions
Negeri Sembilan	Tampin	Batang Melaka			Batang Melaka	N18 Jalan Batang Melaka – Ayer Kuning Selatan	T-junctions
Negeri Sembilan	Tampin	Batang Melaka			Railway crossing bridge		
Malacca	Jasin	Batang Melaka			Batang Melaka		
Malacca	Jasin	Selandar			Jalan Kampung Jus	M120 Jalan Kampung Jus – Kampung Jus	T-junctions
Malacca	Jasin	Selandar			Selandar	M8 Malacca State Route M8 – Alor Gajah, Lendu, Masjid Tanah, Nyalas	Junctions
Malacca	Jasin	Kesang Pajak			Kampung Tengah		
Malacca	Jasin	Kesang Pajak			Kesang Pajak	M2 Jalan Durian Tunggal–Tangkak – Malacca City, Batu Berendam, Durian Tunggal, Jasin, Chin-Chin, Tangkak; North–South Expressway Southern Route / AH2 – Kuala Lumpur, Johor Bahru	T-junctions
1.000 mi = 1.609 km; 1.000 km = 0.621 mi
