= Malaysia Federal Route 61 =

Road in Malaysia

Federal Route 61
- Jalan Alor Gajah–Tampin; Jalan Dato' Mohd Zin

Route information
- Maintained by Malaysian Public Works Department
- Length: 14.08 km (8.75 mi)

Major junctions
- North end: Tampin, Negeri Sembilan
- FT 191 Jalan Lama Alor Gajah; FT 19 AMJ Highway; M10 Jalan Simpang Ampat; FT 1 Federal Route 1
- South end: Alor Gajah, Malacca

Location
- Country: Malaysia
- Primary destinations: Gemencheh, Gemas, Pulau Sebang

Highway system
- Highways in Malaysia; Expressways; Federal; State

Federal Route 61, or Jalan Alor Gajah–Tampin or Jalan Dato' Mohd Zin on Malacca side, is a federal road in Malacca and Negeri Sembilan state, Malaysia. The road connects Alor Gajah in the south to Tampin in the north. The road is named after former Melaka Chief Minister, Mohd Zin Abdul Ghani.

== Route background ==
The Kilometre Zero of the Federal Route 61 starts at Tampin, Negeri Sembilan.

== Features ==
At most sections, the Federal Route 61 was built under the JKR R5 road standard, allowing maximum speed limit of up to 90 km/h.

There are no overlaps, or sections with motorcycle lanes.

There is one alternate route: Pulau Sebang–Tampin: Tampin Bypass (see below).

== Junction lists ==
Legend:

- I/C - Interchange, I/S - Intersection, RSA - Rest and service area, OBR - Overhead bridge restaurant, R/R - Restaurant and rest plaza, L/B - Layby, V/P - Vista point, TN - tunnel, T/P - Toll plaza, BR - Bridge
- C - Cloverleaf, S - Stack, T-A - Trumpet-A, T-B - Trumpet-B, DT - Directional-T/Y, SDT - Semi-Directional-T/Y, P-Y - Partial-Y, D - Diamond, P-C - Partial cloverleaf, D-D - Diverging diamond, D-R - Direct ramp

State	District	Location	km	mi	Name	Destinations	Notes
Malacca	Alor Gajah	Alor Gajah			Alor Gajah	FT 191 Jalan Lama Alor Gajah – Seremban, Rembau, Alor Gajah Hospital, Malacca City, Muar, Batu Pahat; North–South Expressway Southern Route / AH2 – Kuala Lumpur, Johor Bahru	Roundabout
Malacca	Alor Gajah	Alor Gajah			Alor Gajah; Alor Gajah District and Land Office	Alor Gajah District and Land Office	
Malacca	Alor Gajah	Alor Gajah			Jalan Alor Gajah Lama	M17 Jalan Alor Gajah Lama – Kampung Balak, Durian Tunggal	T-junctions
Malacca	Alor Gajah	Alor Gajah			AMJ Highway	FT 19 AMJ Highway – Seremban, Rembau, Malacca City, Muar, Batu Pahat; North–South Expressway Southern Route / AH2 – Kuala Lumpur, Johor Bahru	Junctions
Malacca	Alor Gajah	Gadek			Kampung Dalong		
Malacca	Alor Gajah	Gadek			Gadek	Gadek Hot Springs	
Malacca	Alor Gajah	Gadek			Jalan Kemuning	M135 Jalan Kemuning – Kemuning	T-junctions
Malacca	Alor Gajah	Pulau Sebang			Pulau Sebang	M10 Jalan Simpang Ampat – Simpang Ampat, Brisu, Lubuk China, A' Famosa Resort, Kemuning, Batang Melaka; North–South Expressway Southern Route / AH2 – Kuala Lumpur, Johor Bahru	Junctions
Malacca	Alor Gajah	Pulau Sebang			Pulau Sebang	FT 61 Tampin Bypass – Seremban, Rembau, Segamat, Kuala Pilah	T-junction
Malacca	Alor Gajah	Tampin			Railway crossing bridge		
Malacca	Alor Gajah	Tampin			Tampin Railway Station	P&R KTM ETS	
Malacca	Alor Gajah	Tampin			Tampin; Malacca side		
Negeri Sembilan	Tampin	Tampin	0.0	0.0	Tampin; Negeri Sembilan side	FT 1 Malaysia Federal Route 1 – Seremban, Rembau, Gemencheh, Gemas, Segamat, Johol, Kuala Pilah; FT 61 Tampin Bypass – Alor Gajah, Malacca	Junctions
1.000 mi = 1.609 km; 1.000 km = 0.621 mi

=== Tampin Bypass ===
State	District	Location	km	mi	Name	Destinations	Notes
Malacca	Alor Gajah	Tampin			Pulau Sebang	FT 61 Main Route – Tampin town centre, Tampin railway station, Alor Gajah, Malacca City	T-junction
Malacca	Alor Gajah	Tampin			Railway crossing bridge		
Malacca	Alor Gajah	Tampin			Tampin; Malacca side		
Negeri Sembilan	Tampin	Tampin			Tampin; Negeri Sembilan side		
Negeri Sembilan	Tampin	Tampin			Tampin; Negeri Sembilan side	FT 1 Malaysia Federal Route 1 – Seremban, Rembau, Tampin town centre, Gemencheh, Gemas, Segamat, Johol, Kuala Pilah	Junctions
1.000 mi = 1.609 km; 1.000 km = 0.621 mi
