= Malaysia Federal Route 191 =

Road in Malaysia

Federal Route 191
- Jalan Lama Alor Gajah (Jalan Dato' Dol Said)

Route information
- Maintained by Malaysian Public Works Department
- Length: 5.50 km (3.42 mi)

Major junctions
- North end: Kampung Melekek
- FT 139 Federal Route 139; FT 61 Federal Route 61; FT 19 AMJ Highway
- South end: Kampung Gajah Mati

Location
- Country: Malaysia
- Primary destinations: Tampin, Alor Gajah

Highway system
- Highways in Malaysia; Expressways; Federal; State

Jalan Lama Alor Gajah or Jalan Dato' Dol Said, Federal Route 191, is a federal road in the state of Malacca, Malaysia. The road connects Kampung Gajah Mati to Kampung Melekek. The Kilometre Zero of the Federal Route 19 starts at Kampung Melekek.

== History ==
The road used to be a part of Federal Route 19.

== Features ==
At most sections, the Federal Route 191 was built under the JKR R5 road standard with partial access control, with a speed limit of 90 km/h.

== Junction lists ==
The entire route is located in Alor Gajah District, Malacca.

Legend:

- I/C - Interchange, I/S - Intersection, RSA - Rest and service area, OBR - Overhead bridge restaurant, R/R - Restaurant and rest plaza, L/B - Layby, V/P - Vista point, TN - tunnel, T/P - Toll plaza, BR - Bridge
- C - Cloverleaf, S - Stack, T-A - Trumpet-A, T-B - Trumpet-B, DT - Directional-T/Y, SDT - Semi-Directional-T/Y, P-Y - Partial-Y, D - Diamond, P-C - Partial cloverleaf, D-D - Diverging diamond, D-R - Direct ramp

Location	km	mi	Name	Destinations	Notes
Alor Gajah			Kampung Gajah Mati	FT 19 AMJ Highway – Seremban, Rembau, Tampin, Malacca City, Muar, Batu Pahat; North–South Expressway Southern Route / AH2 – Kuala Lumpur, Johor Bahru	T-junctions
Alor Gajah			Kampung Gajah Mati		
Alor Gajah			Kampung Sungai Petai		
Alor Gajah			Alor Gajah Industrial Area	Alor Gajah Industrial Area	T-junctions
Alor Gajah			Kampung Ayer Udang	FT 139 Malaysia Federal Route 139 – Masjid Tanah, Lendu, Machap, Selandar, Nyalas	Junctions
Alor Gajah			Kampung Tepat		
Alor Gajah			Alor Gajah	Jalan Kelemak Jaya	T-junctions
Alor Gajah			Alor Gajah		
Alor Gajah			Alor Gajah; Bulatan Alor Gajah	FT 61 Malaysia Federal Route 61 – Tampin, Gemencheh, Gemas, Segamat, Alor Gajah District and Land Office	Roundabout
Alor Gajah			Alor Gajah; Dataran Alor Gajah	Dataran Alor Gajah, Muzium Adat	
Alor Gajah			Alor Gajah		
Alor Gajah			Alor Gajah Hospital	Alor Gajah Hospital	
Alor Gajah	0.0	0.0	Kampung Gajah Mati	FT 19 AMJ Highway – Seremban, Rembau, Tampin, Malacca City, Muar, Batu Pahat; North–South Expressway Southern Route / AH2 – Kuala Lumpur, Johor Bahru	T-junctions
1.000 mi = 1.609 km; 1.000 km = 0.621 mi
