= Julies =

Julies may refer to:

== People ==
- Isaac Julies (born 1952), South African politician
- Nathaniel Julies, South African boy that was killed by police in South Africa, see killing of Nathaniel Julies
- Samuel Julies (born 1993), South African soccer player
- Wayne Julies (born 1978), South African rugby union footballer

== Other uses ==
- Plural of Julie (given name)
- Plural of the month of July

== See also ==
- Julie (disambiguation)
- Julie's, Malaysian biscuit brand
