= Gadek Hot Spring =

Hot spring in Alor Gajah, Melaka, Malaysia

- Kolam Air Panas Gadek
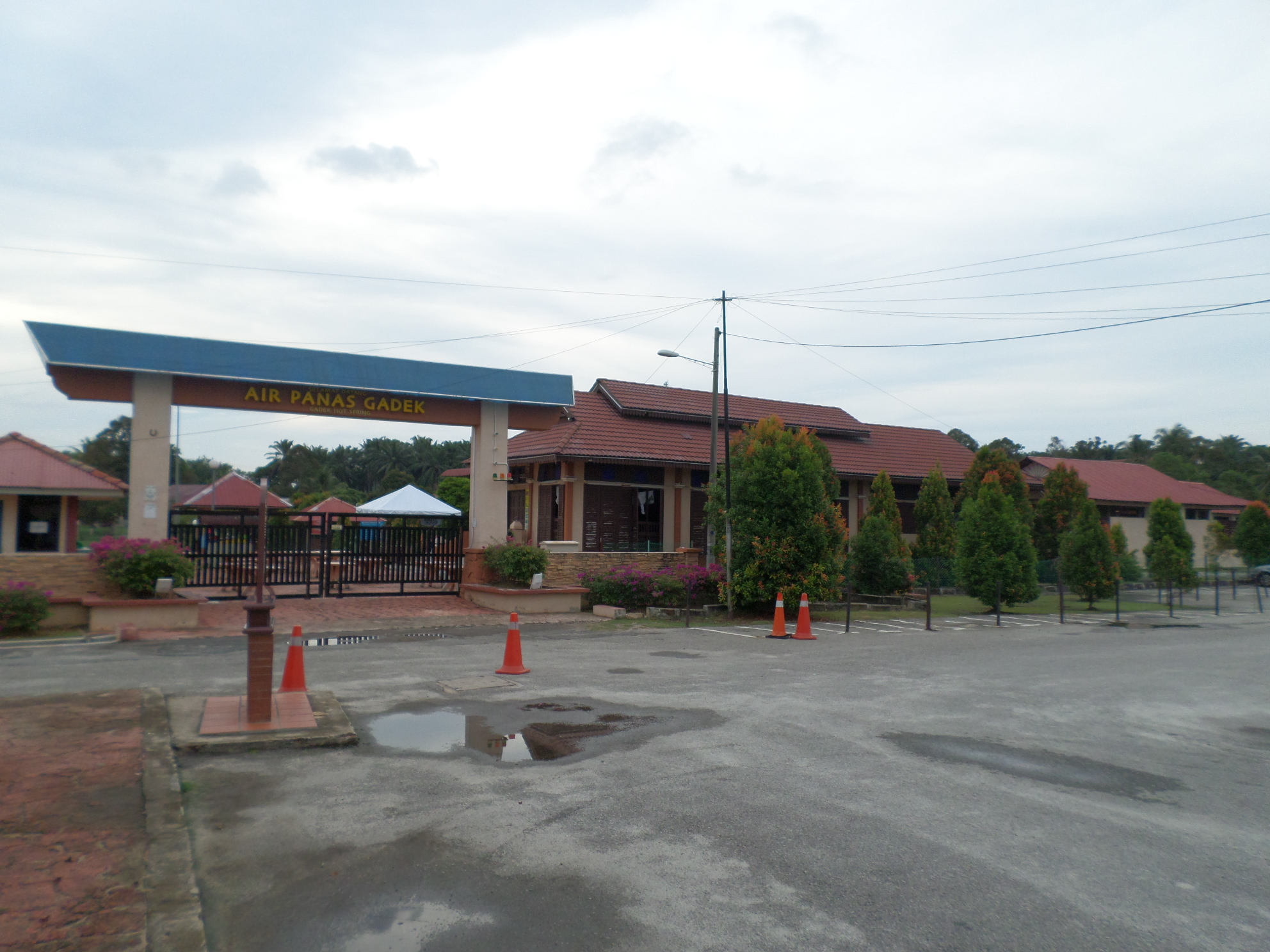
- Interactive map of Gadek Hot Spring
- Location: Alor Gajah, Melaka, Malaysia
- Coordinates: 2°24′30.7″N 102°14′20.2″E
- Type: hot spring
- Discharge: 5.4 litres per minute
- Temperature: 56 °C (133 °F)

The Gadek Hot Spring (Malay: Kolam Air Panas Gadek) is a hot spring in Alor Gajah, Melaka, Malaysia.

== History ==
The area around the hot spring was firstly developed in the 1980s and has been improved over time as a popular tourist attraction.

== Geology ==
The hot spring has a surface temperature of 56 °C with an average water flow of 5.4 litres per minute, containing hydrogen sulphite gas.

== Facilities ==
The hot spring is equipped with restaurant, food stalls, children's playground, outdoor swimming pool and bathrooms.

== Opening time ==
The hot spring opens everyday from 7.00 a.m. to 9.00 p.m.

== See also ==
- Geography of Malaysia
