= Malacca State Route M3 =

Road in Malaysia

Melaka Route 3
- Jalan Datuk Wira Poh Ah Tiam (Jalan Lorong Pandan)

Major junctions
- North end: Kesidang
- FT 19 AMJ Highway; FT 19 Federal Route 19; FT 5 Federal Route 5
- South end: Jalan Tengkera (Tranquerah Road)

Location
- Country: Malaysia
- Primary destinations: Tengkera (Tranquerah)

Highway system
- Highways in Malaysia; Expressways; Federal; State

Malacca State Route M3, Jalan Datuk Wira Poh Ah Tiam, also known as Jalan Lorong Pandan, is a major highway in Malacca state, Malaysia. It was built in April 2007 and was named after former Malacca's State Assemblyman for Machap and also State Housing and Local Government Committee, Datuk Wira Poh Ah Tiam.

== Naming ==
Lorong Pandan was given a new name, Jalan Datuk Wira Poh ah Tiam, which was suggested by Mohd Ali Rustam, and has passed in the Malacca State Legislative Assembly on 21 March 2007, the name was officially changed on 23 March 2007.

== Development ==
A road sign at the junction where Jalan Malim turns left into Lorong Pandan was replaced to the Jalan Datuk Wira Poh Ah Tiam. A new road sign was also installed at the junction where Tengkera leading to Limbongan and turns left into Lorong Pandan.

In October 2022, a sign was added at the junction where Jalan Malim turns left into Jalan Datuk Wira Poh Ah Tiam to allow drivers to turn on red.

== Junction lists ==
The entire route is located in Melaka Tengah District, Malacca.

Legend:

- I/C - Interchange, I/S - Intersection, RSA - Rest and service area, OBR - Overhead bridge restaurant, R/R - Restaurant and rest plaza, L/B - Layby, V/P - Vista point, TN - tunnel, T/P - Toll plaza, BR - Bridge
- C - Cloverleaf, S - Stack, T-A - Trumpet-A, T-B - Trumpet-B, DT - Directional-T/Y, SDT - Semi-Directional-T/Y, P-Y - Partial-Y, D - Diamond, P-C - Partial cloverleaf, D-D - Diverging diamond, D-R - Direct ramp

Location	km	mi	Name	Destinations	Notes
Kesidang			Kesidang	FT 19 AMJ Highway – Tampin, Alor Gajah, Batu Berendam, Jasin, Muar, Batu Pahat; FT 19 Jalan Malim – Jalan Hang Tuah (Bona Vista), Malacca City	T-junctions
Kesidang			Taman Kesidang		
Kesidang			Kampung Lapan	Jalan Kampung Lapan – Kampung Lapan, Kampung Enam	T-junctions
Kesidang			Taman Kenanga	Homestay Malacca	
Tengkera			Kampung Pandan Mawar	Kampung Pandan Mawar, Malacca International School	Junctions
Tengkera	0.0	0.0	Tengkera (Tranquerah)	FT 5 Malaysia Federal Route 5 – Port Dickson, Masjid Tanah, Sungai Udang, Tanjung Kling, Limbongan, Malacca City	T-junctions
1.000 mi = 1.609 km; 1.000 km = 0.621 mi
