= Malacca State Route M144 =

Road in Malaysia

Melaka Route 144

Major junctions
- West end: Bukit Beruang
- FT 143 Ayer Keroh Highway; FT 264 Federal Route 264; FT 144 Federal Route 144
- South end: Jalan Kandang–Jasin

Location
- Country: Malaysia
- Primary destinations: Bukit Katil, Duyong

Highway system
- Highways in Malaysia; Expressways; Federal; State

Jalan Bukit Katil or Jalan Tun Kudu, Malacca State Route M144 is a dual-carriageway state road in Malacca state, Malaysia. It is also a main road to North–South Expressway Southern Route via FT143 Lebuh Ayer Keroh.

== Junction lists ==
The entire route is located in Melaka Tengah District, Malacca.

Legend:

- I/C - Interchange, I/S - Intersection, RSA - Rest and service area, OBR - Overhead bridge restaurant, R/R - Restaurant and rest plaza, L/B - Layby, V/P - Vista point, TN - tunnel, T/P - Toll plaza, BR - Bridge
- C - Cloverleaf, S - Stack, T-A - Trumpet-A, T-B - Trumpet-B, DT - Directional-T/Y, SDT - Semi-Directional-T/Y, P-Y - Partial-Y, D - Diamond, P-C - Partial cloverleaf, D-D - Diverging diamond, D-R - Direct ramp

| Location | km | Name | Destinations | Notes |
|---|---|---|---|---|
| Bukit Beruang | | Bukit Beruang; Bukit Beruang I/S | Jalan Istana – Bukit Beruang, Istana Melaka, Multimedia University (MMU) Melaka Campus, Pantai Hospital; FT 143 Ayer Keroh Highway – Ayer Keroh, Batu Berendam, Malacca City; North–South Expressway Southern Route / AH2 – Kuala Lumpur, Johor Bahru | Junctions |
| Bukit Katil | | Taman IKS Bukit Katil | | |
| Bukit Katil | | Bukit Katil; Bukit Katil I/S | FT 264 Malaysia Federal Route 264 – Ayer Keroh, Seri Negeri complex, Duyong, Semabok, Umbai, Muar, Batu Pahat | Junctions |
| Bukit Katil | | Bukit Katil | | |
| Bukit Katil | | BTP Melaka | Bahagian Teknologi Pendidikan (BTP) Negeri Melaka | |
| Bukit Katil | | SMK Bkit Katil | Sekolah Menengah Kebangsaan Bkit Katil | |
| Bukit Katil | | Sungai Duyong bridge | | |
| Bukit Katil | | Taman PJ | | |
| Ayer Molek | | Jalan Kandang–Jasin | FT 144 Malaysia Federal Route 144 – Bemban, Jasin, Kandang, Umbai, Muar; M165 Jalan Tun Kudu – Tiang Dua, Bukit Lintang | Junctions |
1.000 mi = 1.609 km; 1.000 km = 0.621 mi
