= Simpang Ampat, Alor Gajah =

Simpang Ampat
- Suburb
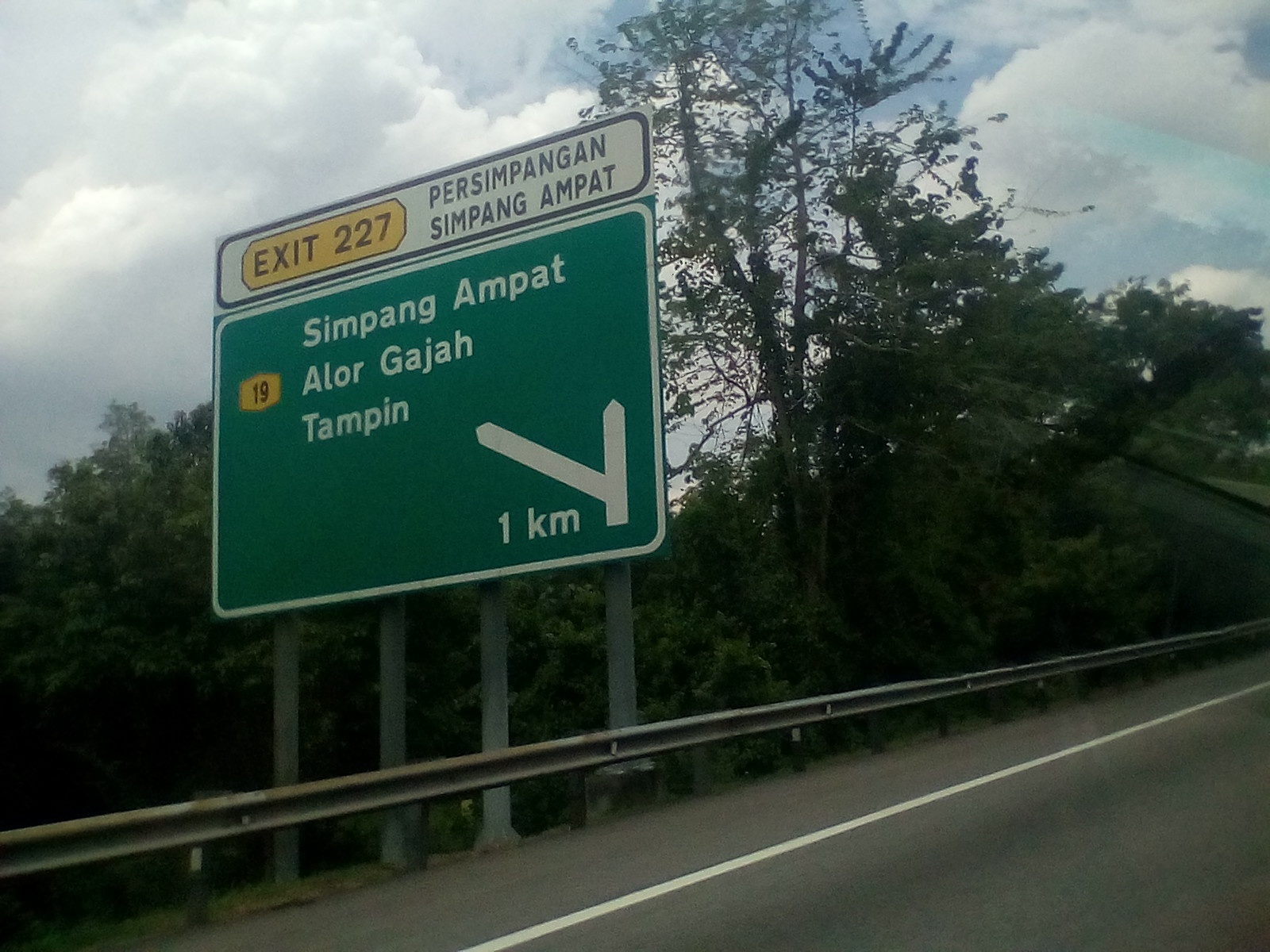
- Simpang Ampat Interchange (Exit 227) Signboard on North-South Expressway, exit left in 1 kilometre.
- Interactive map of Simpang Ampat
- Coordinates: 2°26′N 102°11′E
- Country: Malaysia
- State: Malacca
- Town: Alor Gajah
- District: Alor Gajah

Area
  - Total: 19.34 km^{2} (7.47 sq mi)

Population
  - Total: 3,558
  - Density: 184.0/km^{2} (476.5/sq mi)
- Time zone: UTC+8 (MYT)
- Postal code: 78000

Simpang Ampat or Simpang Empat or Sempang Ampat is a small town in Alor Gajah District, Malacca, Malaysia. Part of the Alor Gajah municipality, it lies adjacent to Taboh Naning, Pulau Sebang, Alor Gajah and Ayer Paabas towns and constitutes the entire Pegoh Mukim.

== Economy ==
- Pegoh Hicom Industrial Park - Home of the Honda Malaysia's car manufacturing plant, which assembling cars for the local market and also selected automotive parts for Honda's overall ASEAN market.

== Education ==
- JKR Centre of Excellence for Engineering and Technology (CREaTE) - A Research institute owned by Public Works Department (JKR) which focuses on asset management, project management and engineering services development.
- Naning National Secondary School

== Religious sites ==
- Al-Hidayah Mosque
- Sri Bala Thandayuthabani Temple

== Tourist attractions ==
- A' Famosa Resort - A family resort located near the town's exit on the North–South Expressway, which features a zoo, a water theme park and a golf course. It was named after a 16th-century Portuguese fort which is located in Malacca City Centre.
- Naning Heritage and History Museum - A museum that houses cultural and historical exhibits and information about Naning. Its building was constructed in 1951 at Bukit Naning (Bukit Pereling) and was used as Official Residency and Hall by Penghulu Haji Mohd Shah bin Mohd Said al-Haj, the 18th Penghulu of Naning as the Administrative Centre for Perpatih Customs from 1953 until his death on 13 June 2004.
