= Lendu, Alor Gajah =

Human settlement in Malaysia

Coordinates: 2°22′N 102°10′E

Lendu is a small town in Alor Gajah District in the Malaysian state of Malacca. Politically, Lendu is situated within the parliamentary constituency of Masjid Tanah and the state constituency of the same name.

== Education ==
- Universiti Teknologi MARA Malacca Branch Alor Gajah Campus (Malay: Universiti Teknologi MARA Cawangan Melaka Kampus Alor Gajah)

== Tourist attractions ==
- The Rubber Escape Resort Hotel

== See also ==
- Alor Gajah District
