= Datuk Wira Poh Ah Tiam Machap Recreational Park =

Park in Alor Gajah, Melaka, Malaysia

- Taman Rekreasi Datuk Wira Poh Ah Tiam Machap
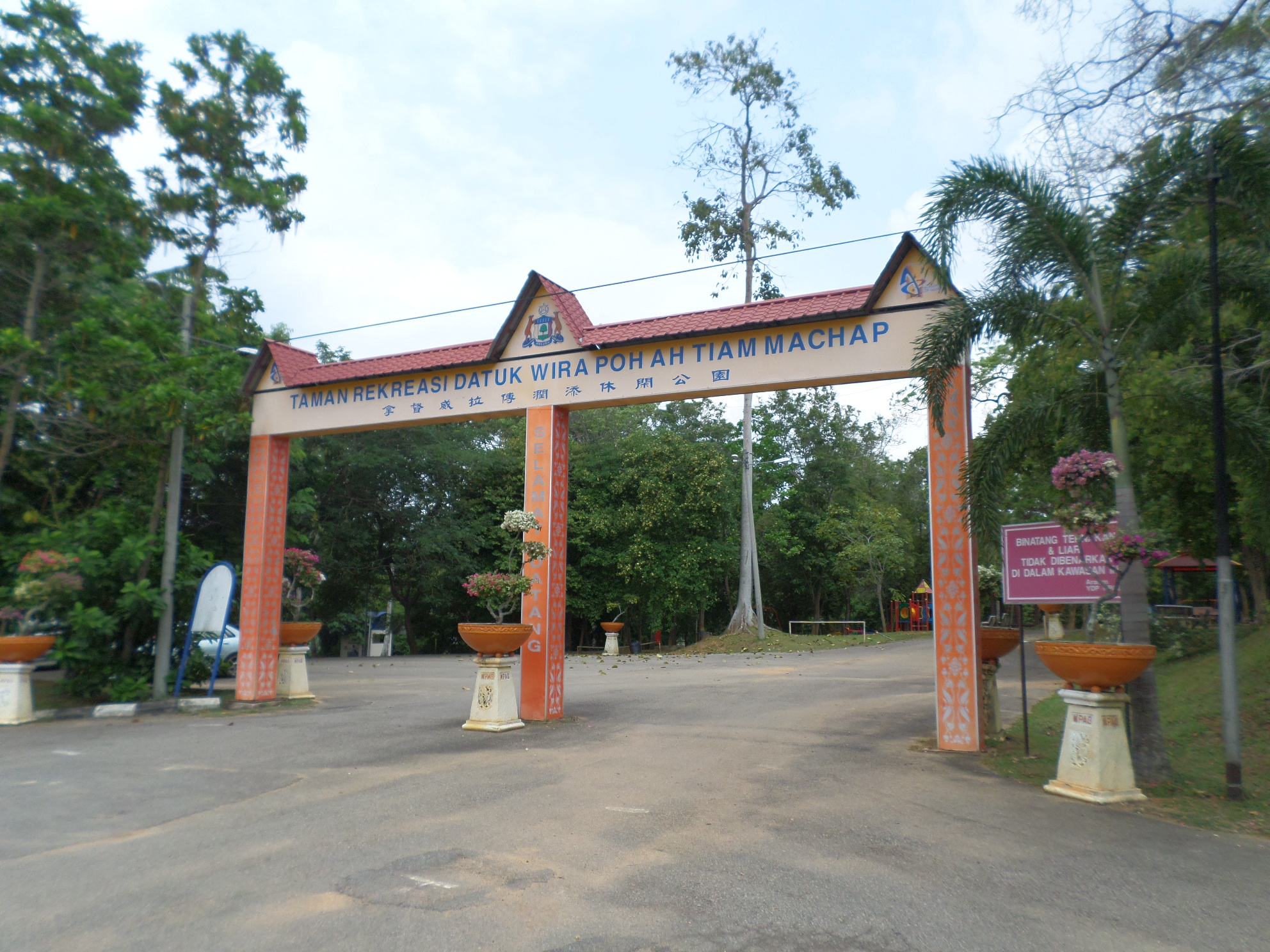
- Interactive map of Datuk Wira Poh Ah Tiam Machap Recreational Park
- Type: park
- Location: Machap Baru, Alor Gajah, Melaka, Malaysia
- Coordinates: 2°22′45.8″N 102°19′42.9″E
- Opened: 2007
- Budget: MYR1.2 million

The Datuk Wira Poh Ah Tiam Machap Recreational Park (Malay: Taman Rekreasi Datuk Wira Poh Ah Tiam Machap; Chinese: 拿督威拉傅润添休闲公园) is a park in Machap Baru, Alor Gajah District, Melaka, Malaysia. The park commemorates the late politician Poh Ah Tiam.

== Architecture ==
The park was constructed with a cost of MYR1.2 million.

== See also ==
- List of tourist attractions in Melaka
