= Lubuk China =

Town in Malacca, Malaysia

Coordinates: 2°27′18″N 102°4′17.4″E

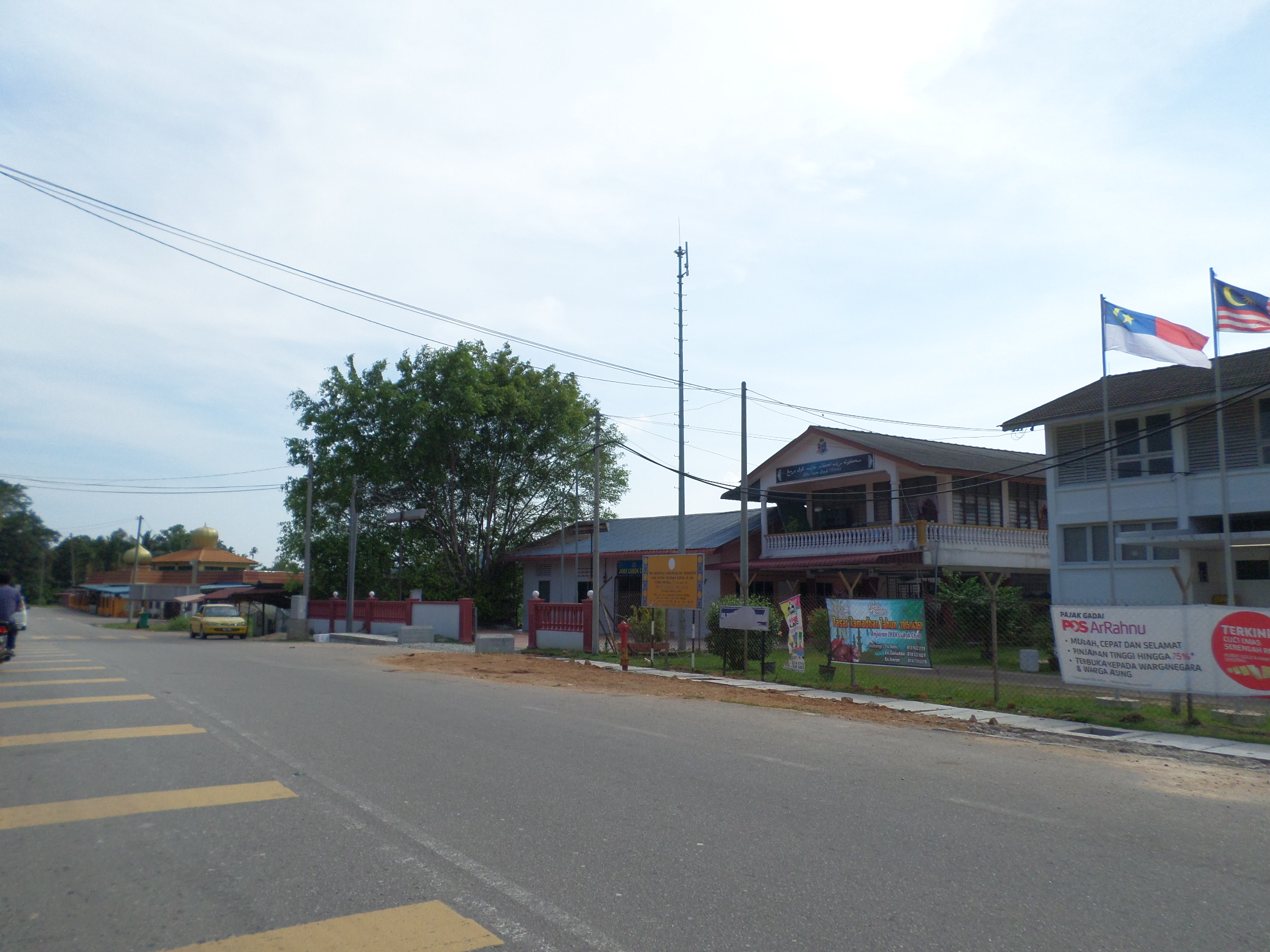
Lubuk China

Lubuk China is a small town in Alor Gajah District, Malacca, Malaysia, situated near the border with Negeri Sembilan.

== Tourist attractions ==
- The Orchard Wellness and Health Resort

== See also ==
- List of cities and towns in Malaysia by population
