= Alor Gajah Square =

Square in Alor Gajah, Malacca, Malaysia

Alor Gajah Square Dataran Alor Gajah
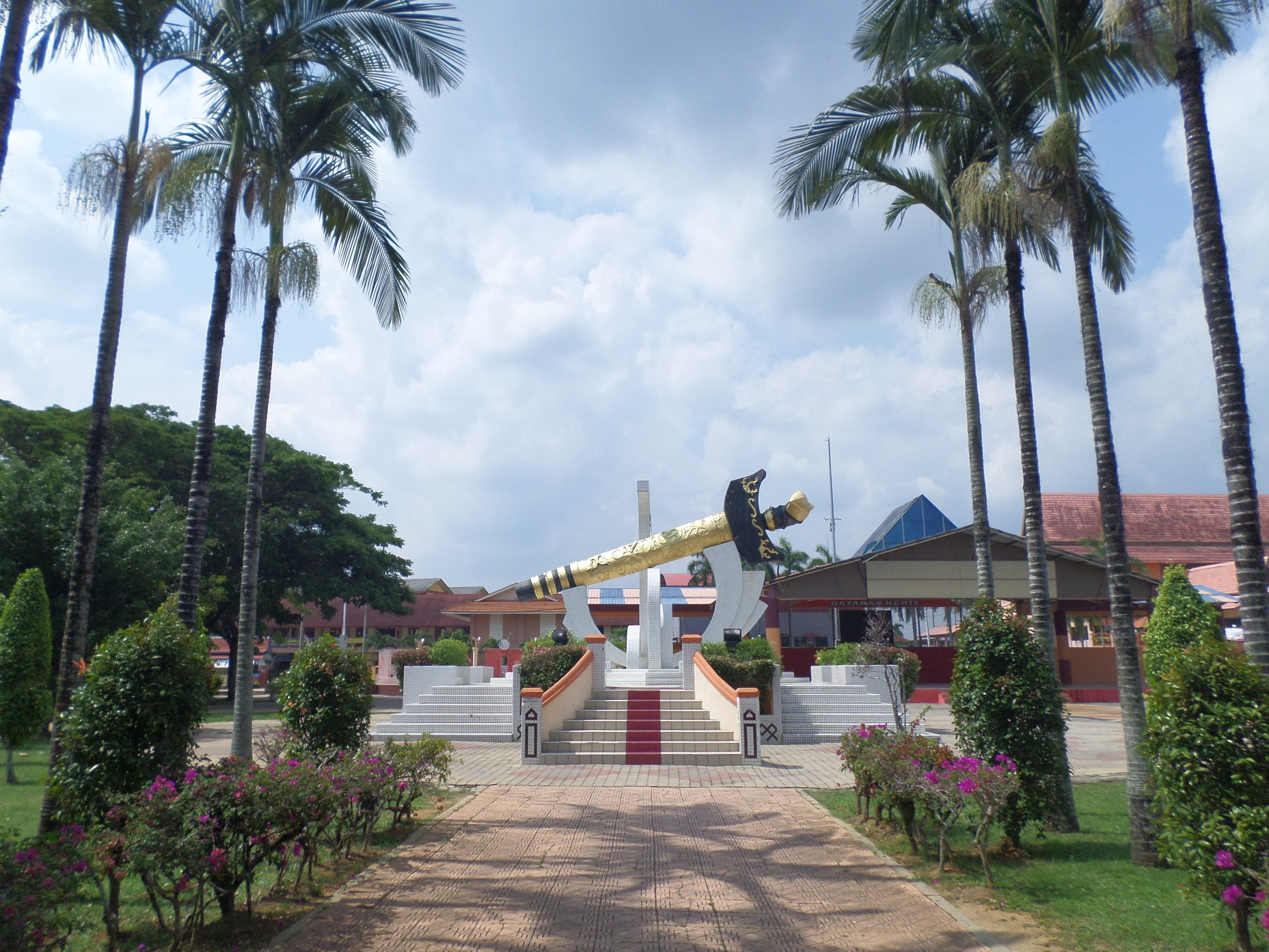
- Architectural style: Town square
- Location: Alor Gajah, Malacca, Malaysia
- Location within Malacca
- Coordinates: 2°22′59.3″N 102°12′35.0″E

Alor Gajah Square (Malay: Dataran Alor Gajah) or Keris Square (Malay: Dataran Keris) is the town square of Alor Gajah in the Malaysian state of Malacca which features a large bronze sculpture of a kris.

== See also ==
- List of tourist attractions in Malacca
