= Julie's =

Malaysian biscuit brand

Julie's Manufacturing Sdn Bhd
- Company type: Private Limited Company
- Industry: Food processing, snack
- Founded: 1981; 45 years ago in Alor Gajah, Malacca, Malaysia
- Headquarters: Alor Gajah, Malacca, Malaysia
- Area served: Global
- Key people: Su Chin Hock, founder
- Products: Biscuits, cookies
- Website: www.julies.com.my
- Footnotes / references <mapframe text='Location of Julie's' width='250' height='250' zoom='16' latitude='2.36357' longitude='102.20644'> { "type": "ExternalData",  "service": "geoshape",  "ids": "Q73982647",  "properties": {    "title": "Julie's", "description": "",

Julie's is a Malaysian biscuit brand founded in 1984 by Su Chin Hock in Malacca, Malaysia. Sold in over 80 countries, it has been marketed as Julie's since 1985. Its products include Julie's Peanut Butter Sandwich biscuits and Julie's Love Letters wafer rolls.

== History ==
Su named the brand Julie's to appeal to the global market and stand out from local competitors. Its logo is a young girl with blonde hair. In an interview, Su's son Tzy Horng said that Julie is a name his father made up and not that of a real person.

In 2021, Julie's character was rebranded with a shorter bob-haircut and red and blue headband. A comedic heist short film Operation Maybe was released online to accompany the rebrand. At that time the company reorganised its range of products and created unified product designs.

== Product lines ==
Julie's divides its products into six lines or Ranges: Sandwich Range, OAT 25 Range, Le-mond Range, Crackers Range, Love Letters Range, Assorted Biscuits Range, Decadent Snack Range, and Other.

== Product issues ==
In October 2008, Julie's biscuits were found to be contaminated with melamine-tainted ammonium bicarbonate from factories in China. Product stocks were recalled and destroyed while orders were withdrawn. Julie's reputation took a hit and customers lost faith. This resulted in a loss of approximately RM14 million linked to the milk scandal.

With the support of the Malaysia External Trade Development Corp (MATRADE) and the Ministry of Health, they were able to recover from the crisis. In 2014, Julie's brought in RM280 million in sales.
