= Malaysia Federal Route 19 =

Road in Malaysia

Federal Route 19

Route information
- Maintained by Malaysian Public Works Department
- Length: 68.50 km (42.56 mi)

Major junctions
- North end: Kampung Ulu Kendong, Negeri Sembilan
- FT 1 Federal Route 1 North–South Expressway Southern Route / AH2; M10 Jalan Simpang Ampat; FT 139 Federal Route 139; FT 191 Jalan Lama Alor Gajah; FT 61 Federal Route 61; FT 19 AMJ Highway
- South end: Malacca Town, Melaka

Location
- Country: Malaysia
- Primary destinations: Tampin, Alor Gajah

Highway system
- Highways in Malaysia; Expressways; Federal; State

Federal Route 19 is a federal road in the state of Malacca, Malaysia. The road connects Kampung Ulu Kendong in Negeri Sembilan to Malacca Town.

== Route background ==
The Kilometre Zero of the Federal Route 19 starts at Kampung Ulu Kendong at Negeri Sembilan–Melaka state border.

== History ==
The road used to be the main railway line of Kemus–Malacca. The railway line was dismantled in 1942, following the Japanese occupation. In 2004, about 80% of the route from Melaka city to Simpang Ampat (including Melaka Bypass and Alor Gajah Bypass) was upgraded to a dual-carriageway known as AMJ Highway (Federal Route 19).

== Features ==
At most sections, the Federal Route 19 was built under the JKR R5 road standard as a dual-carriageway highway (except Kg. Gajah Mati–Alor Gajah–Kg. Melekek section and Taboh Naning–Ulu Kendong section) with partial access control, with a speed limit of 90 km/h.

There is one overlap: Bulatan Taboh Naning–Kampung Melekek, Kampung Gajah Mati–Malim Jaya (overlaps with 19 AMJ Highway).

There are no alternate routes or sections with motorcycle lanes.

== Junction lists ==
Legend:

- I/C - Interchange, I/S - Intersection, RSA - Rest and service area, OBR - Overhead bridge restaurant, R/R - Restaurant and rest plaza, L/B - Layby, V/P - Vista point, TN - tunnel, T/P - Toll plaza, BR - Bridge
- C - Cloverleaf, S - Stack, T-A - Trumpet-A, T-B - Trumpet-B, DT - Directional-T/Y, SDT - Semi-Directional-T/Y, P-Y - Partial-Y, D - Diamond, P-C - Partial cloverleaf, D-D - Diverging diamond, D-R - Direct ramp

State	District	Km	Exit	Name	Destinations	Notes
Malacca	Melaka Tengah			Malacca; Dewan Hang Tuah	Jalan Munshi Abdullah – Semabok; Jalan Kubu – Tengkera	
Malacca	Melaka Tengah			Malacca; Jalan Hang Tuah (Hang Tuah Walk)	Federal building, Chief Ministers Department, Stadium Hang Tuah	
Malacca	Melaka Tengah			Jalan Panglima Awang	Jalan Panglima Awang	Junctions
Malacca	Melaka Tengah			Jalan Bachang	Jalan Bachang	Junctions
Malacca	Melaka Tengah			Kampung Tambak	FT 19 AMJ Highway – Muar, Batu Pahat; M3 Klebang Highway – Klebang, Tengkera	
Malacca				Kampung Gajah Mati–Bulatan Taboh Naning	see also FT 19 AMJ Highway	
Malacca	Alor Gajah			Simpang Ampat-NSE; Bulatan Taboh Naning	Kampung Taboh Naning, Historical Dol Said's House; North–South Expressway Southern Route – Kuala Lumpur, Seremban, Pedas-Linggi, Ayer Keroh, Malacca, Jasin, Johor Bahru	Roundabout
Malacca	Alor Gajah			Kampung Lanjut		
Malacca	Alor Gajah			Naning	Masjid Naning, Makam Dol Said	
Malacca	Alor Gajah			Kampung Cherana Puteh		
Malacca	Alor Gajah		BR	Railway crossing bridge		
Malacca	Alor Gajah			Kemus	Kemus	T-junctions
Negeri Sembilan	Rembau	0.0		Kampung Ulu Kendong	FT 1 Malaysia Federal Route 1 – Seremban, Rembau, Tampin, Gemencheh, Gemas, Segamat	T-junctions

== See also ==
- AMJ Highway
