= A' Famosa Resort =

Resort in Alor Gajah, Melaka, Malaysia

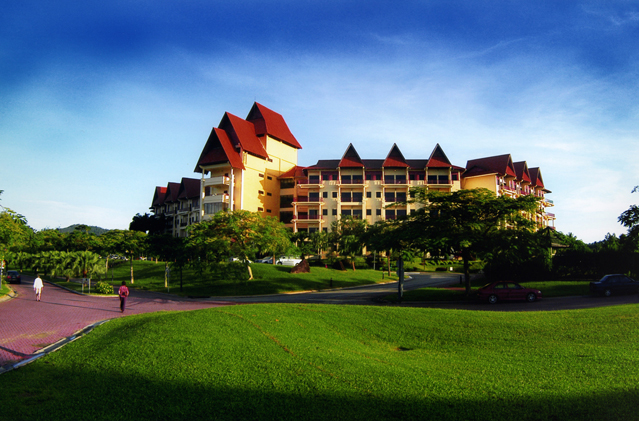
- Resort Hotel
- Interactive map of A' Famosa Resort
- Location: Simpang Ampat, Alor Gajah, Malacca, Malaysia
- Coordinates: 02°24′18.19″N 102°13′13.84″E
- Opened: 1992
- Area: 1,300 acres (530 ha)

A' Famosa Resort Malaysia is a family resort located in Alor Gajah, Malacca, Malaysia, near the Simpang Ampat exit on the North–South Expressway. It was named after the 16th century Portuguese fort of the same name which was once stood near the harbour of Malacca city. The logo of the resort also incorporates a stylized silhouette of the fort's gateway in the background.

== Overview ==
A' Famosa is situated on 1,300 acres (530 ha), the bulk of which is a 27-hole golf course, a water theme park called Water Theme Park, a zoo called Safari Wonderland, a night entertainment Old West, a Resort Hotel, and several blocks of condotels and villas.

== Components ==
The 150-acre (61 ha) A’Famosa Safari Wonderland is a wildlife safari that is home to more than 100 species of the animals, featuring a Walk-through Area, Chicken Farm, Monkey Island, and a truck drive through the Safari park itself. The park also hosts a number of animal presentations, such as Elephant Encounter, Colour of the Birds, Animals Fun Play

The A’Famosa Water Theme Park covers an area of 20 acres (8.1 ha), the largest Water Theme Park in Malaysia, offers slides, pools and activities for family, adults and kids

The 5-acre (2.0 ha) A’Famosa Old West features a various entertainment outlets, such as restaurants, a shopping village, etc. There is also a nightly carnival which consists of an animal musical parade, dancing and fireworks.

The accommodation available at A’Famosa Resort consists of a resort hotel with balconies. This facility offers self-contained studios, 2-bedroom and 3-bedroom units, and villas ranging from three to five bedrooms.

Freeport A'Famosa Outlet is an open-air mall located near the resort and operated in collaboration with London-based Freeport Retail. Opened on 28 January 2016, its architecture is themed on Malacca's Dutch heritage and features a lake, fountains, carousel and windmill. It offers over 80 brands of fashion, sports and accessories with a total size of 180,000 square feet (17,000 m^{2}).

== History ==
In July 2014, A'Famosa Resort made the largest ketupat replica in Malaysia which was recorded in the Malaysia Book of Records (MBOR)

== Transportation ==
A Famosa Resort is a 10-minute drive via Federal Route 61 from KTM Komuter Tampin (Pulau Sebang).

== Gallery ==
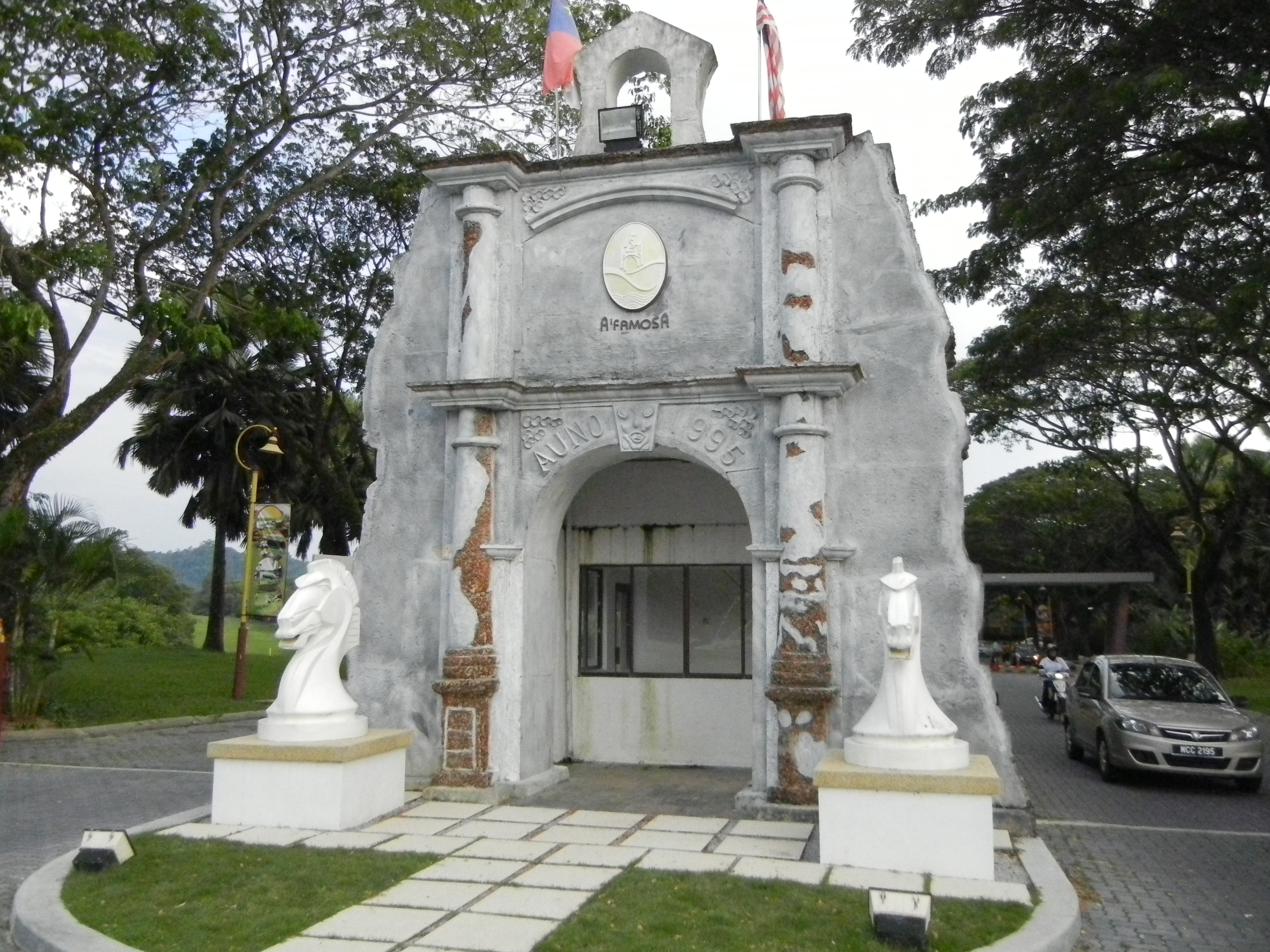
Entrance gate

== See also ==
- List of tourist attractions in Malacca
