= Serkam =

Town in Jasin, Melaka, Malaysia

Coordinates: 2°09′N 102°23′E

- Town
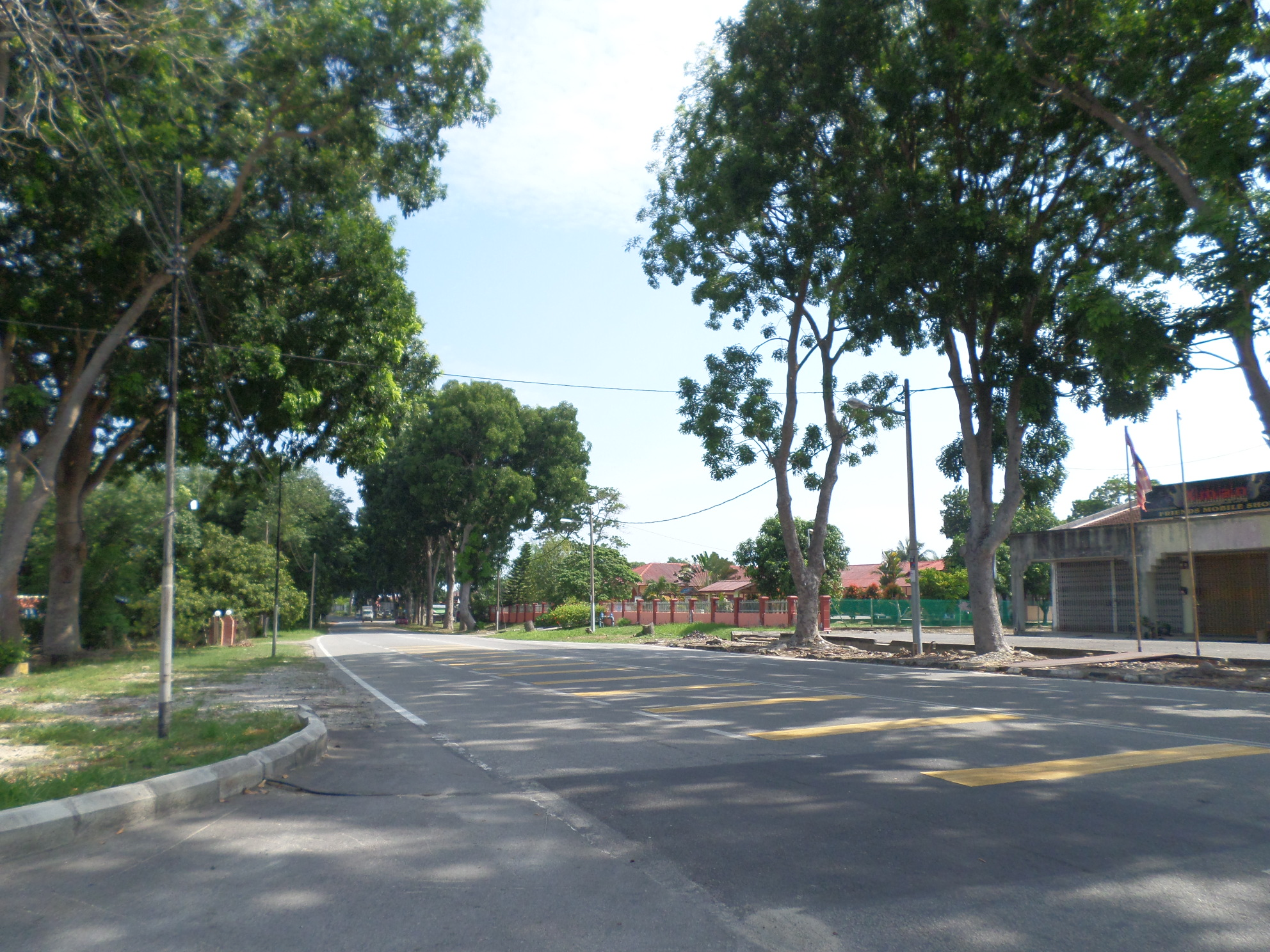

- Serkam in Jasin District
- Country: Malaysia
- State: Malacca
- District: Jasin

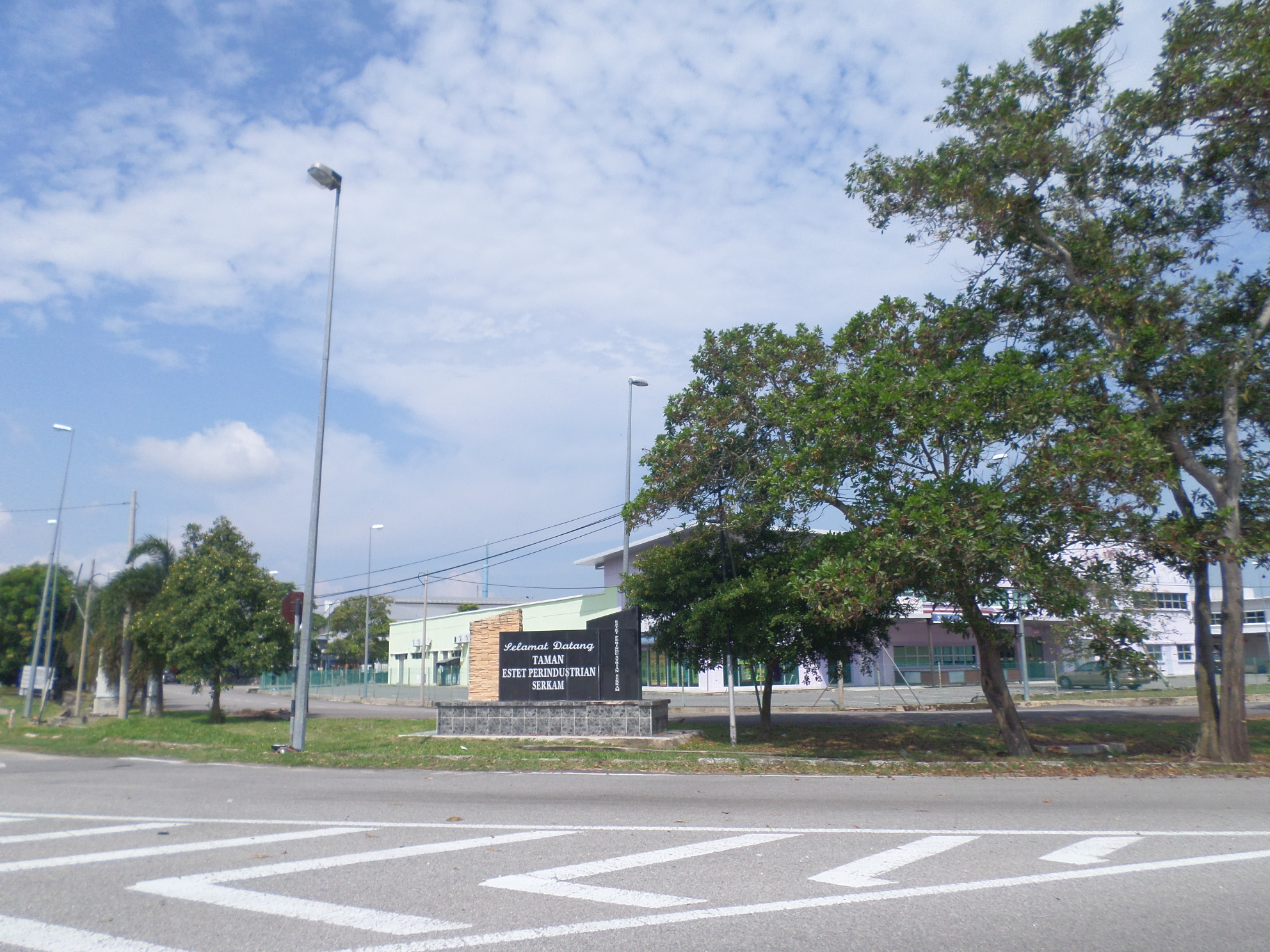
Serkam Industrial Area

Serkam is a mukim and town in Jasin District in the Malaysian state of Malacca.

== Economy ==
Serkam Industrial Area is the town's main industrial area. Notable tenants include Melaka Halal Hub Sdn Bhd, a fully owned subsidiary of the Malacca State Development Corporation.

== Places of worship ==
- Serkam Jamek Mosque

== Tourist attractions ==
- Ikan bakar Food Court.

== See also ==
- Jasin District
