= Selandar =

Town in Jasin, Malacca, Malaysia

Coordinates: 2°23′N 102°23′E

Selandar Selandau (Malaccan Malay) Solanda (Negeri Sembilan Malay)
- Town and Mukim
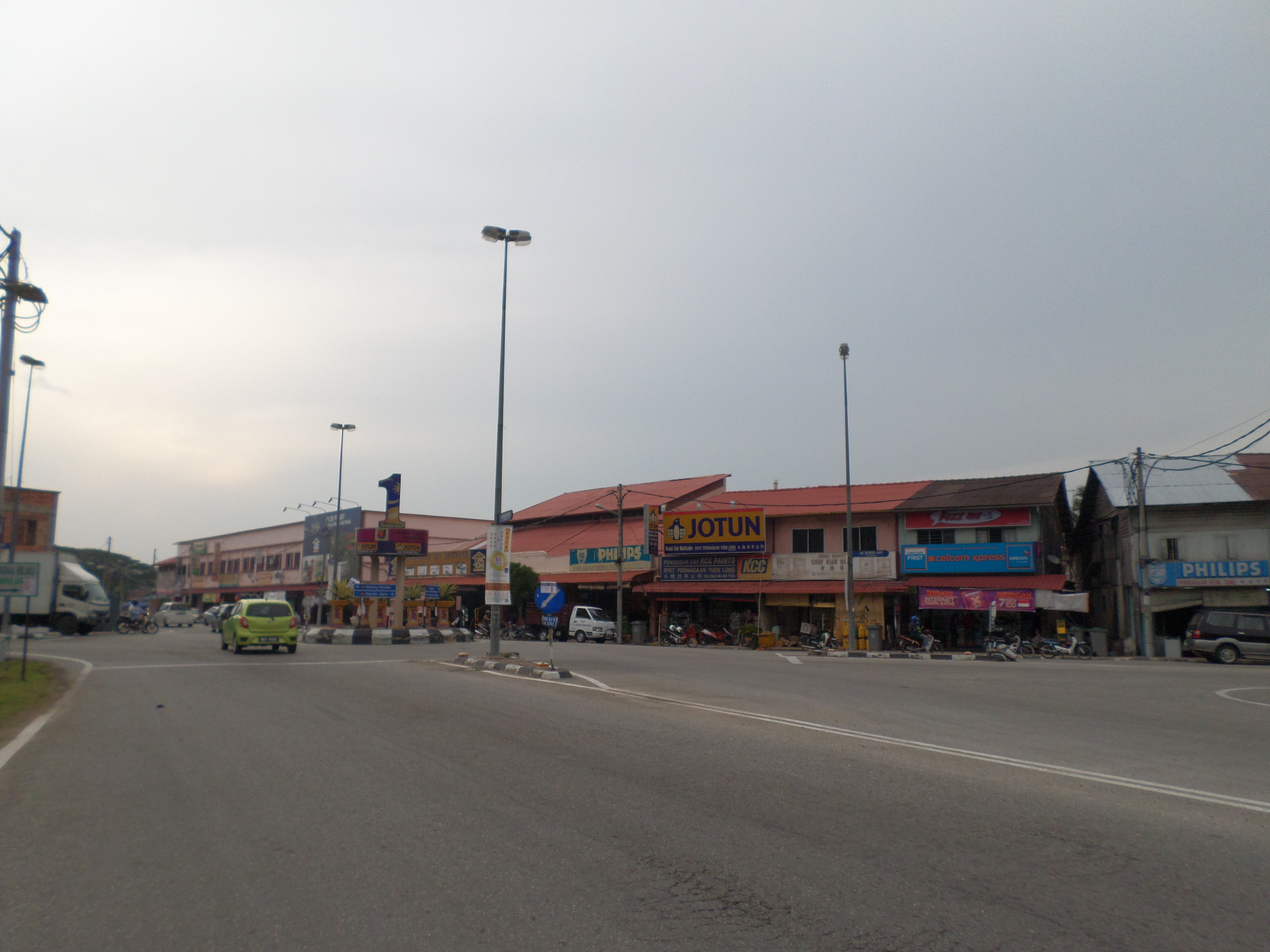

- Selandar in Jasin District
- Country: Malaysia
- State: Malacca
- District: Jasin

Selandar (Malaccan Malay: Selandau; Negeri Sembilan Malay: Solanda; Jawi: سلاندر) is a small town in Jasin District, Malacca, Malaysia.

== Education ==
- SBP Integrasi Selandar - One of the two Fully Residential Schools in the state of Malacca and one of the 12 such schools in Malaysia.
- Selandar Community College
- Selandar Industrial Training Institute

== Tourist attractions ==
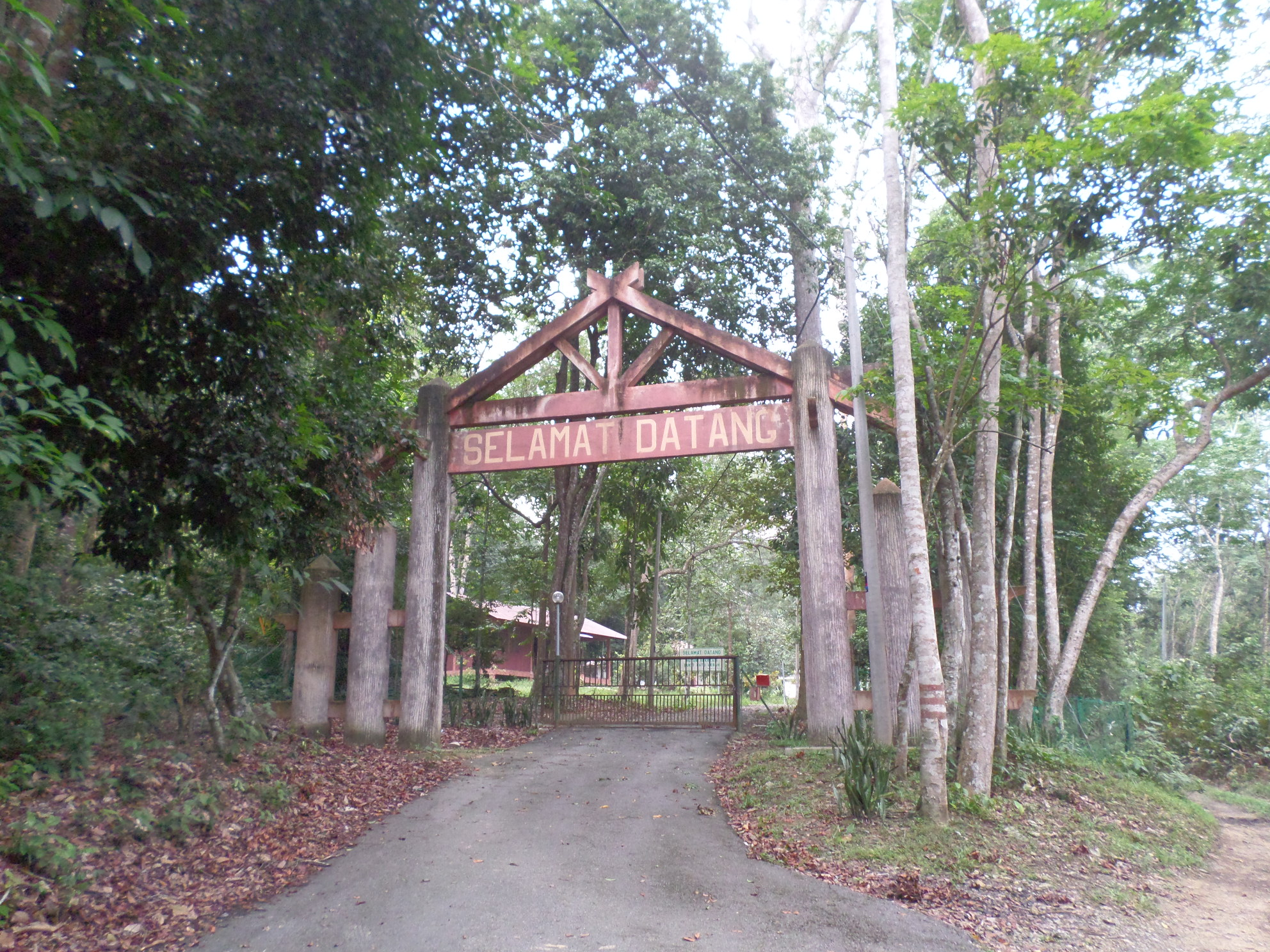
Bukit Batu Lebah Jungle Eco Park

- Bukit Batu Lebah Recreational Forest - A recreational forest situated in the Bukit Senggeh Forest Reserve built for hiking and caving activities.
- Bukit Langsat Recreational Forest
- Selandar Agro Park
