= Alor Gajah District =

District in Malacca, Malaysia

- District
- Daerah Alor Gajah
- Location of Alor Gajah District in Malacca
- Interactive map of Alor Gajah District
- Location of Alor Gajah District in Malaysia
- Coordinates: 2°16′N 102°09′E
- Country: Malaysia
- State: Malacca
- Seat: Alor Gajah
- Local area government(s): Alor Gajah Municipal Council (Alor Gajah North); Hang Tuah Jaya Municipal Council (Alor Gajah Southeast)

Government
  - District officer: Rahiji Ranom

Area
  - Total: 660 km^{2} (250 sq mi)

Population (2019)
  - Total: 212,000
  - Density: 320/km^{2} (830/sq mi)
- Time zone: UTC+8 (MST)
  - Summer (DST): UTC+8 (Not observed)
- Postcode: 76100 and 78xxx
- Calling code: +6-06-5
- Vehicle registration plates: M

Alor Gajah District, formerly known as Northern District, is one of the three administrative districts of Malacca, Malaysia. It borders Tampin District, Rembau District and Port Dickson District (including the exclave of Tanjung Tuan) in Negeri Sembilan to the north and borders Jasin and Melaka Tengah Districts in the east and south respectively. Alor Gajah Municipal Council is the local government for this district.

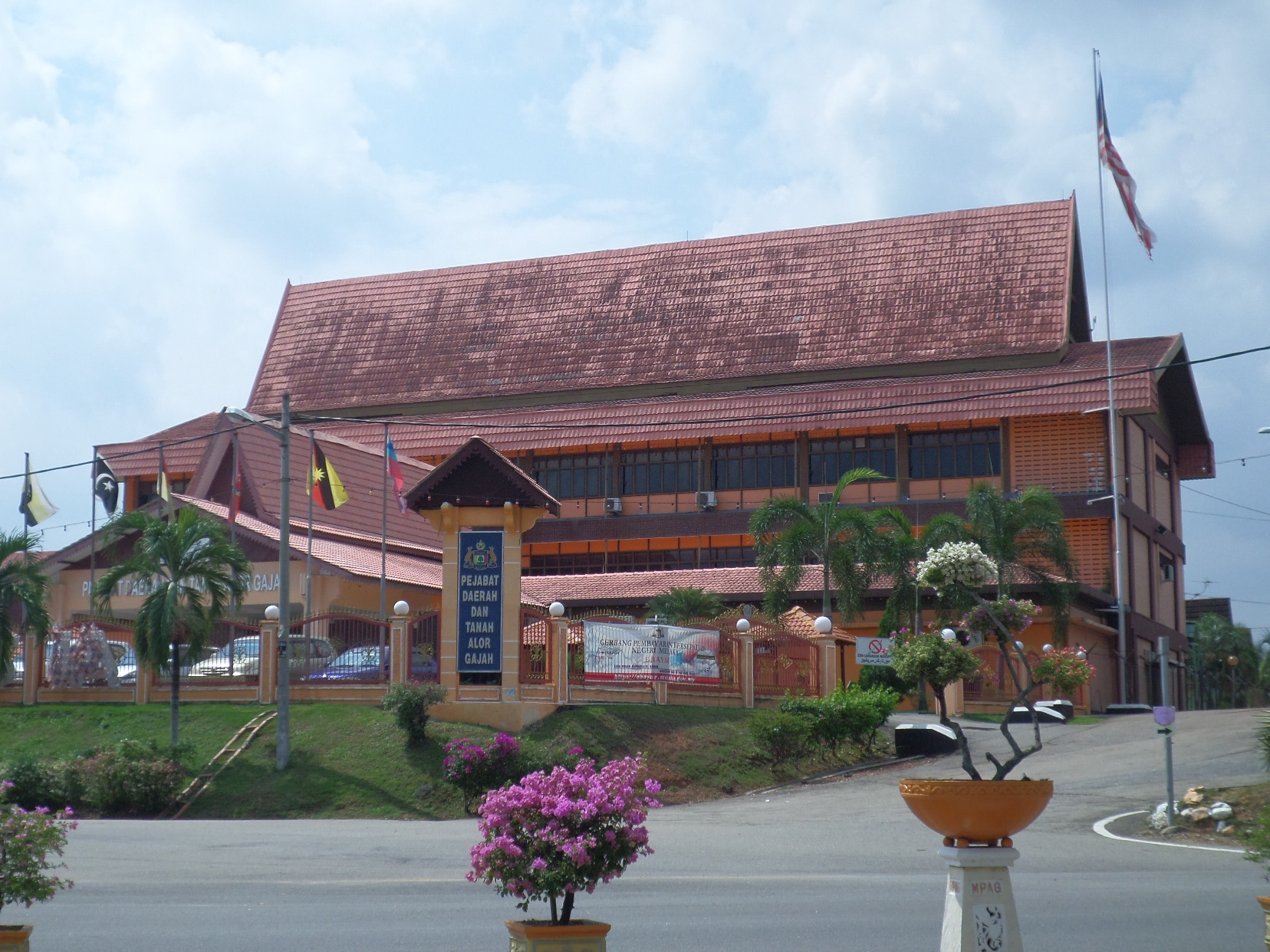
Alor Gajah District and Land Office

== Administrative divisions ==

The district is divided into 31 mukims (sub-districts) and consists of 7 towns which are Alor Gajah, Masjid Tanah, Pulau Sebang, Lubuk China, Kuala Sungai Baru, Rambia and Durian Tunggal.

Mukim	Area	Mukim	Area
1	Ayer Paabas	17	Parit Melana
2	Belimbing	18	Pegoh
3	Beringin	19	Pulau Sebang
4	Brisu	20	Ramuan Cina Besar
5	Durian Tunggal	21	Ramuan Cina Kecil
6	Gadek	22	Rembia
7	Kelemak	23	Sungai Baru Hilir
8	Kemuning	24	Sungai Baru Ulu
9	Kuala Linggi	25	Sungai Baru Tengah
10	Kuala Sungai Baru	26	Sungai Buluh
11	Lendu	27	Sungai Petai
12	Machap	28	Sungai Siput
13	Masjid Tanah	29	Taboh Naning
14	Melaka Pindah	30	Tanjung Rimau
15	Melekek	31	Tebong
16	Padang Sebang		

== Demographics ==
Historical population
Year	Pop.	±%
1991	116,653	—
2000	132,317	+13.4%
2010	173,712	+31.3%
2020	249,356	+43.5%

== Federal Parliament and State Assembly Seats ==
List of Alor Gajah district representatives in the Federal Parliament (Dewan Rakyat)

Parliament	Seat Name	Member of Parliament	Party
P134	Masjid Tanah	Mas Ermieyati Samsudin	Perikatan Nasional (PPBM)
P135	Alor Gajah	Adly Zahari	Pakatan Harapan (AMANAH)

List of Alor Gajah district representatives in the State Legislative Assembly

Parliament	State	Seat Name	State Assemblyman	Party
P134	N1	Kuala Linggi	Rosli Abdullah	Barisan Nasional (UMNO)
P134	N2	Tanjung Bidara	Ab Rauf Yusoh	Barisan Nasional (UMNO)
P134	N3	Ayer Limau	Hameed Basheer	Barisan Nasional (UMNO)
P134	N4	Lendu	Sulaiman Md Ali	Barisan Nasional (UMNO)
P134	N5	Taboh Naning	Zulkiflee Mohd Zin	Barisan Nasional (UMNO)
P135	N6	Rembia	Muhammad Jailani Khamis	Barisan Nasional (UMNO)
P135	N7	Gadek	Shanmugam Ptcyhay	Barisan Nasional (MIC)
P135	N8	Machap Jaya	Ngwe Hee Sem	Barisan Nasional (MCA)
P135	N9	Durian Tunggal	Zahari Kalil	Barisan Nasional (UMNO)

== Educational institutions ==
- Advanced Technology Training Centre (ADTEC; Malay: Pusat Latihan Teknologi Tinggi), Taboh Naning
- Malaysian Maritime Academy (Malay: Akademi Laut Malaysia, ALAM), Kuala Sungai Baru
- University College Agroscience Malaysia (UCAM), Ayer Pa'abas
- University College of Islam Melaka (Malay: Kolej Universiti Islam Melaka, KUIM), Kuala Sungai Baru
- University of Kuala Lumpur (UniKL) Taboh Naning Campus, Taboh Naning - Institute of Chemical and Bioengineering Technology
- Universiti Teknologi MARA (UiTM) Alor Gajah Campus, Lendu
- MARA College of High Skills (Malay: Kolej Kemahiran Tinggi MARA), Masjid Tanah
- National Youth Institute of High Skills (IKTBN; Malay: Institut Kemahiran Tinggi Belia Negara), Masjid Tanah
- Malacca Matriculation College (Malay: Kolej Matrikulasi Melaka), Londang, Masjid Tanah
- Poultry Institute of Technology (ITU; Malay: Institut Teknologi Unggas) Masjid Tanah
- Masjid Tanah Community College (Malay: Kolej Komuniti Masjid Tanah), Masjid Tanah

== Transport ==
- Pulau Sebang/Tampin railway station at Pulau Sebang

== Tourist attractions ==
- A' Famosa Resort
- Alor Gajah British Graveyard
- Alor Gajah Square
- Cape Rachado Lighthouse
- Datuk Wira Poh Ah Tiam Machap Recreational Park
- Dol Said's Grave
- Gadek Hot Spring
- Pengkalan Balak Beach
- Kota Supai

== See also ==
- Districts of Malaysia
