= Alor Gajah =

- Town and district capital
- Alor Gajah Town; Bandar Alor Gajah
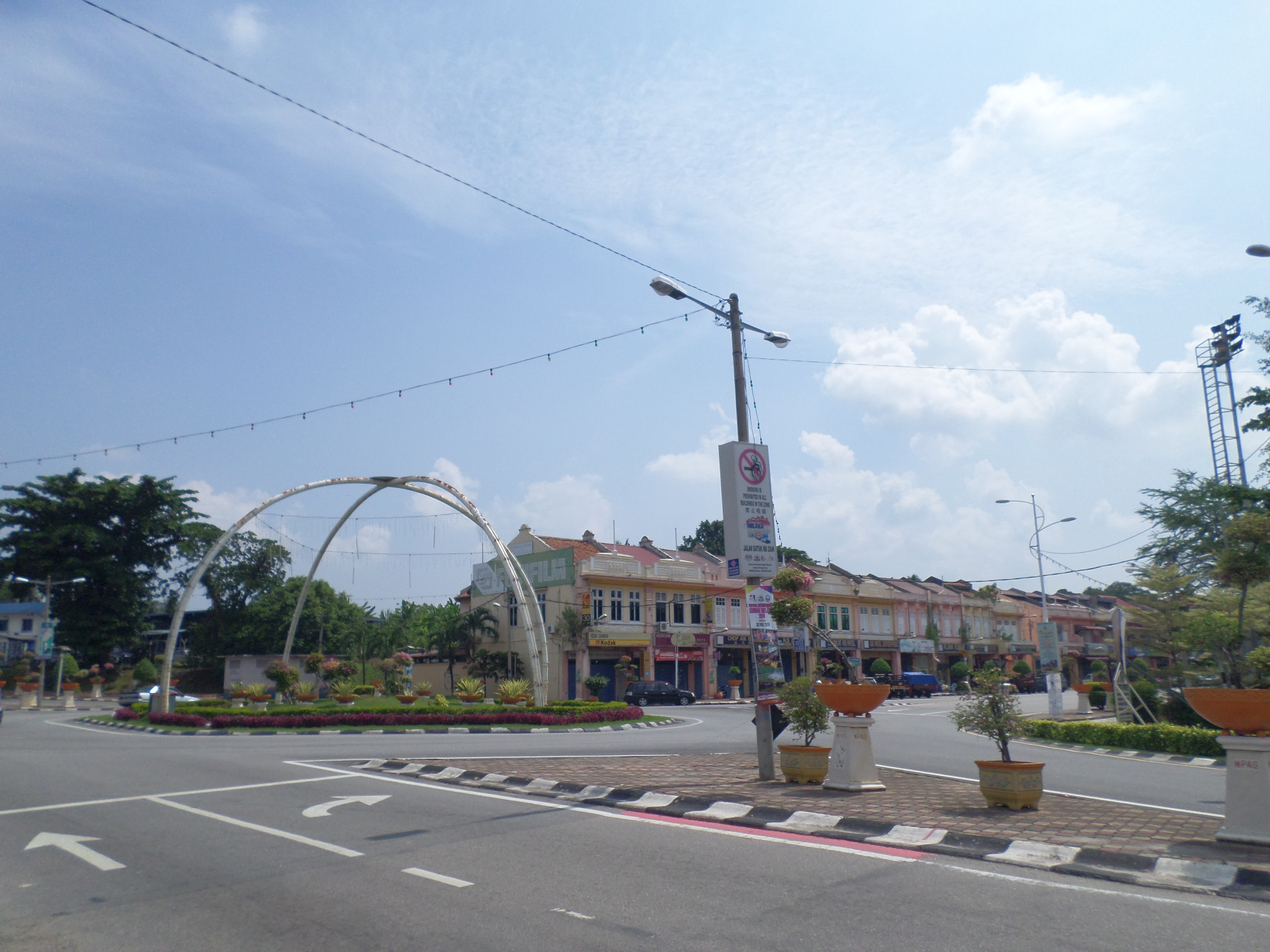

- Emblem
- Motto: Alor Gajah Dynamic - Progressive - Holistic (Malay: Alor Gajah Dinamik - Progresif - Holistik)
- Interactive map of Alor Gajah
- Coordinates: 2°23′00″N 102°13′00″E
- Country: Malaysia
- State: Malacca
- District: Alor Gajah
- Granted municipal status: 1 May 2003

Government
  - Type: Local government
  - Body: Alor Gajah Municipal Council
  - President: Saifuddin Abdul Karim
  - MP: Adly Zahari (PH–AMANAH)
  - MLA: Muhammad Jailani Khamis (PN–PAS)

Population (2010)
  - Alor Gajah Town: 21,267
  - Demonym: Alor Gajahan
- Time zone: UTC+8 (MST)
  - Summer (DST): Not observed
- Postal code: 78xxx
- Area code(s): +6065 (landline only)
- Vehicle registration: M
- Website: www.mpag.gov.my

Alor Gajah Municipal Council Majlis Perbandaran Alor Gajah

Type
- Type: Local authority

History
- Founded: 1 May 2003

Leadership
- President: Saifuddin Abdul Karim
- Municipal Secretary: Saleh Mohd Dom

Meeting place
- Majlis Perbandaran Alor Gajah (MPAG), Lebuh AMJ, 78000 Alor Gajah, Melaka, Malaysia.

Website
- www.mpag.gov.my

Alor Gajah is a town and district seat of Alor Gajah District in the Malaysian state of Malacca. It is governed by Alor Gajah Municipal Council (Malay: Majlis Perbandaran Alor Gajah), which was formerly known as Alor Gajah District Council (Malay: Majlis Daerah Alor Gajah) from 1 July 1978 until 1 May 2003.

== Etymology ==
Alor Gajah used to be one of the forest areas believed to be the routes (Malay: alor) for wild elephants (Malay: gajah).

== Climate ==
Climate data for Alor Gajah
Month	Jan	Feb	Mar	Apr	May	Jun	Jul	Aug	Sep	Oct	Nov	Dec	Year
Mean daily maximum °C (°F)	31 (88)	32 (90)	32 (90)	32 (90)	31 (88)	31 (88)	31 (88)	30 (86)	31 (88)	31 (88)	31 (88)	30 (86)	32.8 (91.0)
Mean daily minimum °C (°F)	22 (72)	22 (72)	23 (73)	23 (73)	23 (73)	23 (73)	22 (72)	22 (72)	22 (72)	22 (72)	22 (72)	22 (72)	23.8 (74.8)
Average rainfall mm (inches)	189.8 (7.47)	210.1 (8.27)	273.5 (10.77)	298.9 (11.77)	243.1 (9.57)	128.7 (5.07)	141.1 (5.56)	168.9 (6.65)	198.1 (7.80)	280.1 (11.03)	330.3 (13.00)	261.2 (10.28)	2,723.8 (107.24)
Average rainy days (≥ 1.0 mm)	11	12	16	16	14	9	10	11	13	17	18	15	162
Source: Climate Data

== Economy ==
Julie's, a prominent biscuits manufacturer, is based in Alor Gajah. In addition, Alor Gajah is home to Honda's Malaysian assembly plant.

== Infrastructures ==
=== Education ===
- Alor Gajah Foundation College of Technology (KT-YAGA; Malay: Kolej Teknologi Yayasan Alor Gajah)
- MARA University of Technology (UiTM), Alor Gajah campus
- University College of Agroscience Malaysia (UCAM)

=== Healthcare ===
- Alor Gajah Hospital

=== Transportation hubs ===
- AG Sentral Bus Terminal
- Masjid Tanah Sentral
- Pulau Sebang Bus and Taxi Terminal
- Pulau Sebang/Tampin railway station

== Tourist attractions ==
- Alor Gajah British Graveyard
- Alor Gajah Square - A town square which features a large bronze sculpture of a kris (dagger).
- A Famosa Resort
  - Freeport A'Famosa Outlet Village
- Cherana Putih Hot Springs
- Gadek Hot Springs
- Tomb of Dol Said

== Transportation ==
=== By road ===
Alor Gajah is served by Federal Routes 19 and 61, as well as State Routes M8 and M17.

=== By rail ===
Alor Gajah town is not served by KTM's West Coast Line. However, the nearest train station is located in Pulau Sebang on the state border with Negeri Sembilan, which is approximately 12 kilometres (7.5 mi) north of the town.

== Gallery ==
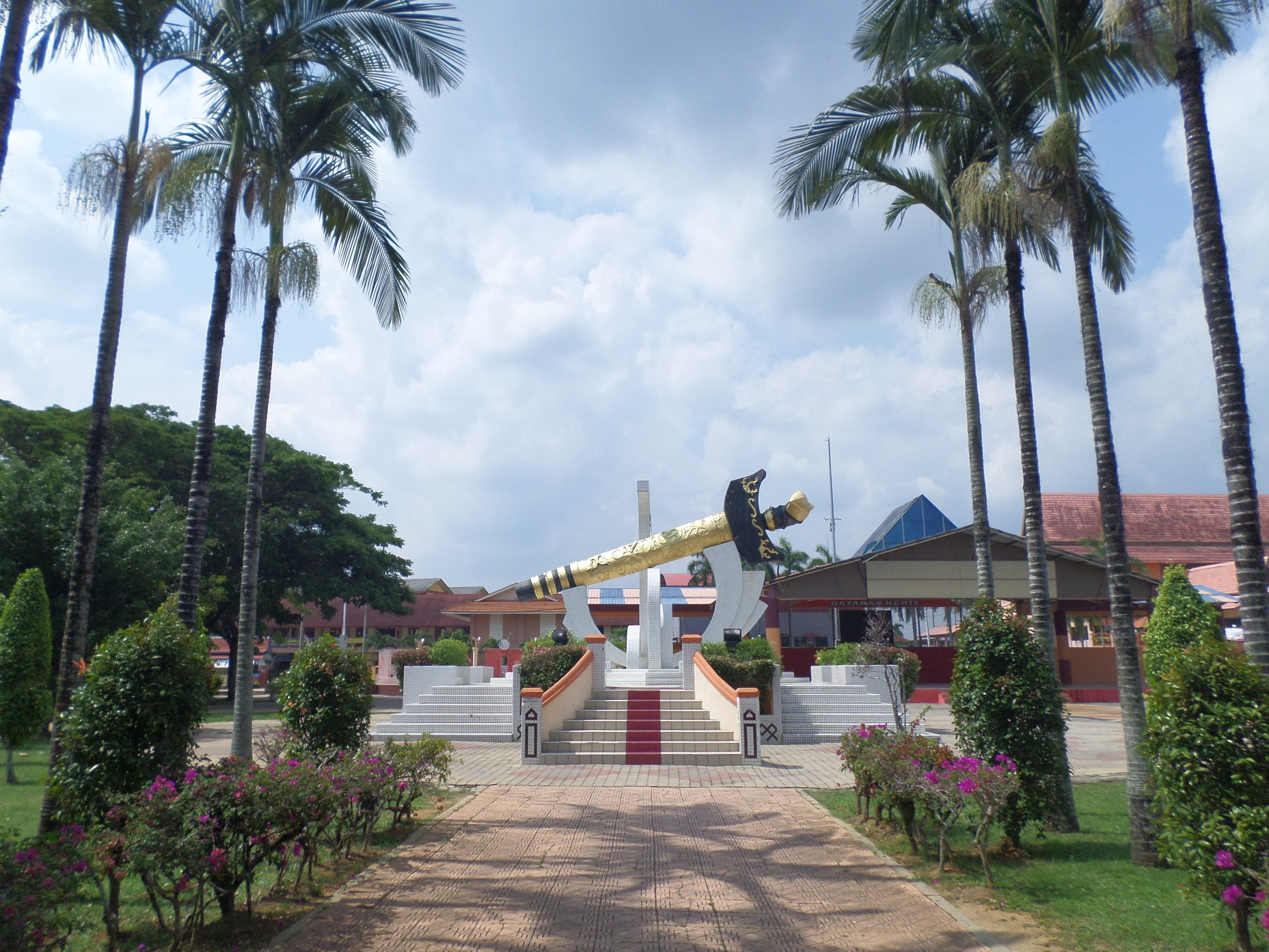
Alor Gajah Square

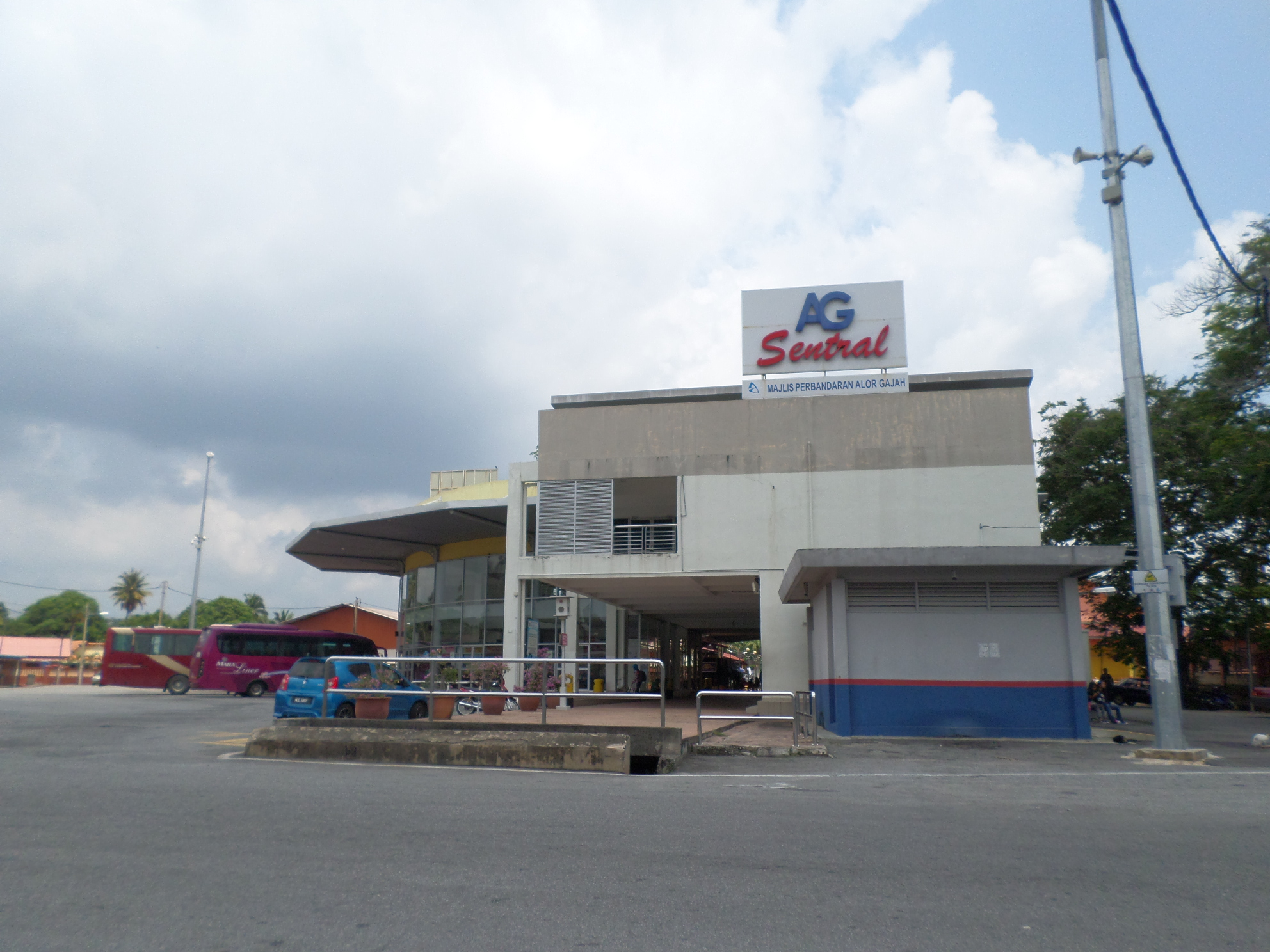
AG Sentral Bus Terminal

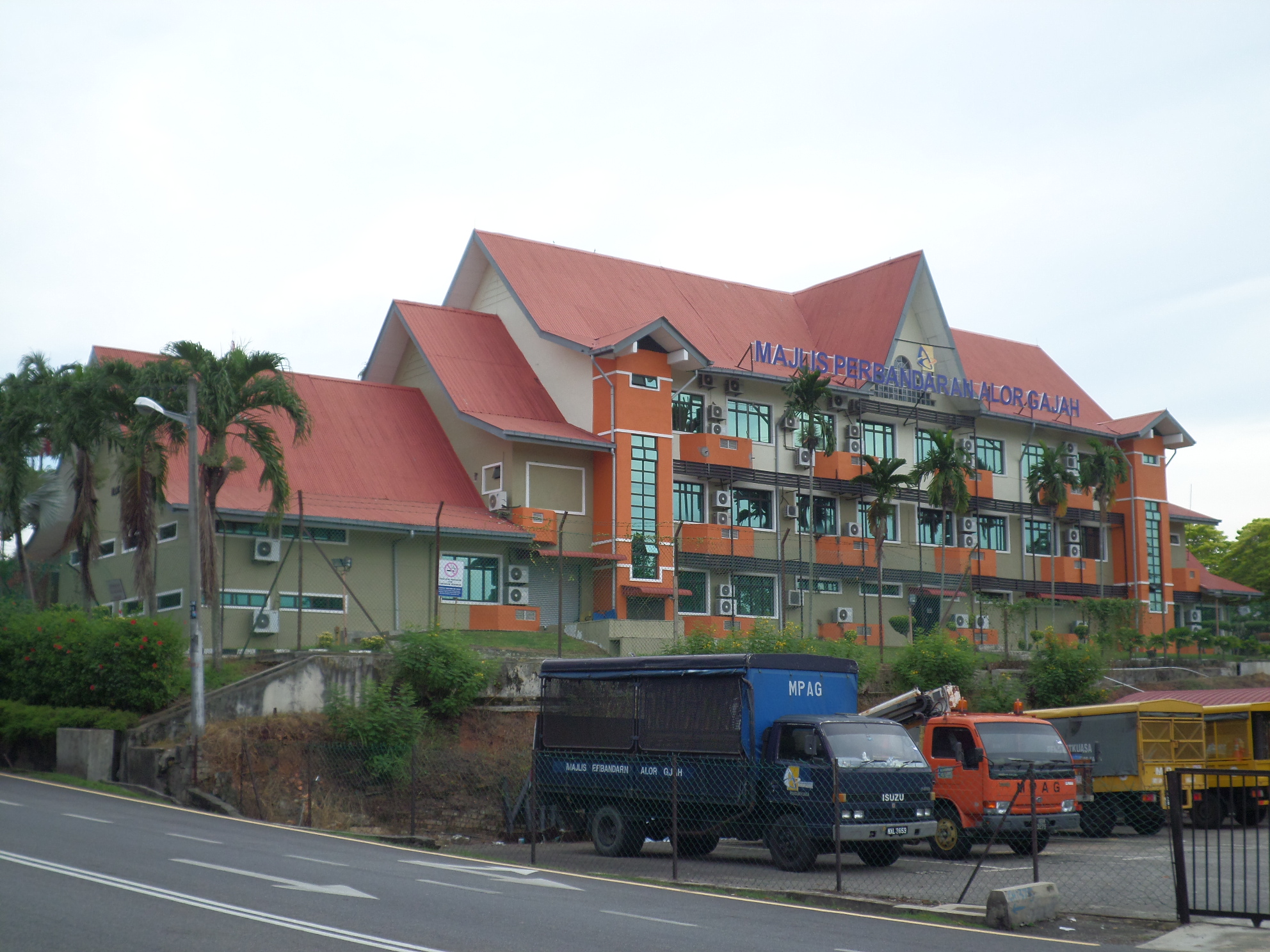
Former Alor Gajah Municipal Council Headquarters

District and Land Office

Ar-Rasyidin Mosque

Alor Gajah-style cucur udang, slathered with sweet chili sauce

== See also ==
- Malacca City
- Hang Tuah Jaya
- Jasin
