= Jasin–NSE Highway =

Road in Malaysia

Melaka Route 25

Route information
- Length: 5 km (3.1 mi)
- Existed: 1997–present
- History: Completed in 1999

Major junctions
- North end: Jasin Interchange
- North–South Expressway Southern Route / AH2; Jasin South Highway; M25 State Route M25
- South end: Jalan Merlimau–Jasin

Location
- Country: Malaysia
- Primary destinations: Lipat Kajang, Jasin, Merlimau

Highway system
- Highways in Malaysia; Expressways; Federal; State

Jasin–NSE Highway is a dual-carriageway highway in Malacca State, Malaysia. It is also a main route to North–South Expressway Southern Route via Jasin Interchange.

== Junction lists ==
The entire route is located in Jasin District, Malacca.

Legend:

- I/C - Interchange, I/S - Intersection, RSA - Rest and service area, OBR - Overhead bridge restaurant, R/R - Restaurant and rest plaza, L/B - Layby, V/P - Vista point, TN - tunnel, T/P - Toll plaza, BR - Bridge
- C - Cloverleaf, S - Stack, T-A - Trumpet-A, T-B - Trumpet-B, DT - Directional-T/Y, SDT - Semi-Directional-T/Y, P-Y - Partial-Y, D - Diamond, P-C - Partial cloverleaf, D-D - Diverging diamond, D-R - Direct ramp

Location	km	mi	Exit	Name	Destinations	Notes
Lipat Kajang	0.0	0.0	233	Jasin-NSE I/C	North–South Expressway Southern Route / AH2 – Kuala Lumpur, Seremban, Ayer Keroh, Tangkak, Johor Bahru, Singapore	Trumpet interchange
Lipat Kajang			Jasin Toll Plaza			
Lipat Kajang			Jasin T/P L/B (both bounds)			
Lipat Kajang	3.0	1.9		Lipat Kajang Estate I/S	Jasin South Highway – Jasin, Bemban	Roundabout
Lipat Kajang	4.0	2.5		Lipat Kajang Estate	Lipat Kajang Estate, Taman Perumahan Dato' Mohd Hidhir Abdul Rahman	Junctions
Lipat Kajang	5.0	3.1		Jalan Merlimau–Jasin I/S	M25 Malacca State Route M25 – Lipat Kajang, Jasin, Nyalas, Asahan, Merlimau, Umbai, Malacca City, MRSM Tun Ghafar Baba Jasin, Politeknik Merlimau	T-junctions
1.000 mi = 1.609 km; 1.000 km = 0.621 mi: Electronic toll collection
