= Malacca State Route M25 =

Road in Malaysia

Melaka Route 25
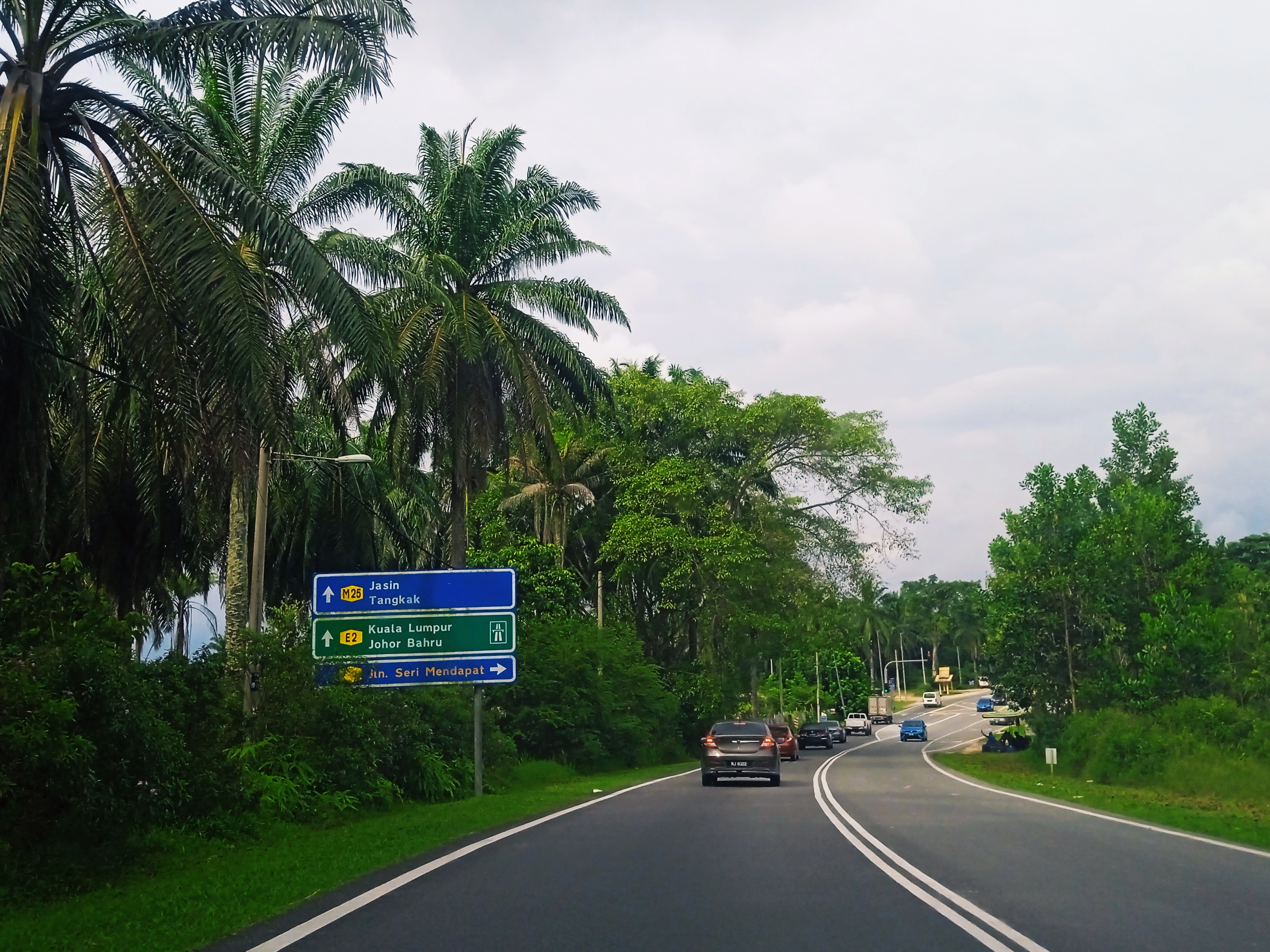
- Jalan Merlimau-Jasin M25 at Kampung Seri Mendapat, Jasin

Major junctions
- North end: Simpang Kerayong, Jasin
- M2 Jalan Durian Tunggal–Tangkak; M25 Jasin-NSE Highway; FT 19 AMJ Highway; M109 Jalan Dato' Mulia; M14 Jalan Merlimau Darat; FT 5 Federal Route 5
- South end: Merlimau

Location
- Country: Malaysia
- Primary destinations: Chin-Chin, Asahan, Tangkak, Nyalas

Highway system
- Highways in Malaysia; Expressways; Federal; State

Jalan Merlimau–Jasin, Malacca State Route M25 is a major road in Malacca state, Malaysia. It is also a main route to the North–South Expressway Southern Route via the Jasin Interchange.

== Route background ==
The Kilometre Zero of Jalan Merlimau–Jasin starts at Merlimau, at its interchange with the Federal Route 5, the main trunk road of the west coast of Peninsular Malaysia.

== Features ==
- Kempas Devon Estate

Most sections of Federal Route M25 were built to the JKR R5 road standard, allowing a maximum speed limit of up to 90 km/h.

=== Alternate routes ===
- Kempas Devon bypass
- Jasin–NSE Highway, a dual carriageway highway to North–South Expressway Southern Route via Jasin Interchange.
- Jasin South Highway, a dual carriageway highway from Jasin Interchange to Jasin, Bemban and Malacca City

There is no motorcycle lanes in this highway.

== Junction lists ==
The entire route is located in Jasin District, Malacca.

Legend:

- I/C - Interchange, I/S - Intersection, RSA - Rest and service area, OBR - Overhead bridge restaurant, R/R - Restaurant and rest plaza, L/B - Layby, V/P - Vista point, TN - tunnel, T/P - Toll plaza, BR - Bridge
- C - Cloverleaf, S - Stack, T-A - Trumpet-A, T-B - Trumpet-B, DT - Directional-T/Y, SDT - Semi-Directional-T/Y, P-Y - Partial-Y, D - Diamond, P-C - Partial cloverleaf, D-D - Diverging diamond, D-R - Direct ramp

Location	km	mi	Name	Destinations	Notes
Merlimau			Merlimau South	FT 5 Malaysia Federal Route 5 – Malacca City, Alor Gajah, Umbai, Sungai Rambai, Muar, Batu Pahat	T-junctions
Merlimau	0.0	0.0	Merlimau	M14 Jalan Merlimau Darat – Merlimau Pasir, Batu Gajah, Sungai Rambai, Malacca City, Alor Gajah, Umbai	Junctions
Merlimau			Merlimau Industrial Area	Merlimau Industrial Area	T-junctions
Merlimau			SeDARY	Sekolah Dato' Abdul Rahman Yaakob	T-junctions
Merlimau			Sekolah Dang Anum	Sekolah Dang Anum	T-junctions
Merlimau			Taman Merlimau	Taman Merlimau	T-junctions
Merlimau			Merlimau Layby, KFC Drive Thru (both bound)		
Merlimau			Masjid Merlimau	Masjid Merlimau	T-junctions
Merlimau			Politeknik Merlimau	Politeknik Merlimau	T-junctions
Merlimau			Bandar Baru Merlimau	Bandar Baru Merlimau	T-junctions
Merlimau			Merlimau Estate	Merlimau Estate	
Merlimau			AMJ Highway	FT 19 AMJ Highway – Malacca City, Alor Gajah, Muar, Batu Pahat	Junctions
Merlimau			Industrial Estate	Industrial Estate	T-junctions
Merlimau			Jalan Tiang Dua	M109 Jalan Dato' Mulia – Tiang Dua, Bemban, Umbai	T-junctions
Merlimau			Seri Mendapat	Jalan Seri Mendapat – Seri Mendapat, UiTM Jasin Campus	T-junctions
Jasin			Kempas Devon Estate	Kempas Devon Estate	T-junctions
Jasin			Kempas Devon Estate	Kempas Devon Estate	T-junctions
Jasin			Jasin–NSE Highway	M25 Jasin–NSE Highway – Jasin, Bemban; North–South Expressway Southern Route / AH2 – Kuala Lumpur, Seremban, Malacca, Ayer Keroh, Tangkak, Pagoh, Johor Bahru, Singapore	T-junctions
Jasin			Lipat Kajang	M129 Malacca State Route M129 – Jasin Industrial Park, Selandar	T-junctions
Jasin			Jasin; Kerayong I/S	M2 Jalan Durian Tunggal–Tangkak – Jasin town centre, Malacca Town, Batu Berendam, Chin-Chin, Nyalas, Asahan, Jementah, Tangkak, Segamat	Roundabout
1.000 mi = 1.609 km; 1.000 km = 0.621 mi
