= Malacca State Route M14 =

Road in Malaysia

Melaka Route 14

Major junctions
- West end: Merlimau
- M25 State Route M25; M113 State Route M113; M115 State Route M115; M25 State Route M117; M119 State Route M119; M112 State Route M112; FT 19 AMJ Highway; FT 5 Federal Route 5
- East end: Sungai Rambai

Location
- Country: Malaysia
- Primary destinations: Batu Gajah, Merlimau Pasir, Teluk Rimba, Sungai Mati

Highway system
- Highways in Malaysia; Expressways; Federal; State

Jalan Merlimau Darat or Jalan Batu Gajah, Malacca State Route M14 is a major road in Malacca state, Malaysia

== Junction lists ==
The entire route is located in Jasin District, Malacca.

Legend:

- I/C - Interchange, I/S - Intersection, RSA - Rest and service area, OBR - Overhead bridge restaurant, R/R - Restaurant and rest plaza, L/B - Layby, V/P - Vista point, TN - tunnel, T/P - Toll plaza, BR - Bridge
- C - Cloverleaf, S - Stack, T-A - Trumpet-A, T-B - Trumpet-B, DT - Directional-T/Y, SDT - Semi-Directional-T/Y, P-Y - Partial-Y, D - Diamond, P-C - Partial cloverleaf, D-D - Diverging diamond, D-R - Direct ramp

Location	km	mi	Name	Destinations	Notes
Merlimau			Merlimau	FT 5 Malaysia Federal Route 5 – Malacca City, Alor Gajah, Umbai, Muar, Batu Pahat, Pontian; M25 Malacca State Route M25 – Jasin; North–South Expressway Southern Route / AH2 – Kuala Lumpur, Johor Bahru	Junctions
Merlimau			Sungai Merlimau Bridge		
Merlimau			Jalan Pahlawan	M113 Jalan Pahlawan – Muar, Batu Pahat	T-junctions
Merlimau			Merlimau Pasir		
Merlimau			Batu Gajah	M115 Jalan Merlimau Pasir – Muar, Batu Pahat	T-junctions
Merlimau			AMJ Highway	FT 19 AMJ Highway – Malacca City, Alor Gajah, Muar, Batu Pahat, Pontian	Junctions
Sungai Rambai			Kampung Sebatu Darat	M117 Malacca State Route M117 – Kampung Simen, Kampung Sebatu, Permatang Tulang, Muar, Batu Pahat	T-junctions
Sungai Rambai			Parit Putat	M119 Jalan Parit Putat – Kampung Parit Putat, Sungai Rambai, Muar, Batu Pahat	T-junctions
Sungai Rambai			Kampung Parit Perawas	M112 Jalan Kesang Tasik – Kesang Tasik, Sungai Mati, Tangkak, Segamat; North–South Expressway Southern Route / AH2 – Kuala Lumpur, Johor Bahru	T-junctions
Sungai Rambai			AMJ Highway	FT 19 AMJ Highway – Malacca City, Alor Gajah, Muar, Batu Pahat, Pontian	Junctions
Sungai Rambai			Sungai Rambai	FT 5 Malaysia Federal Route 5 – Malacca City, Alor Gajah, Umbai, Muar, Batu Pahat, Pontian	T-junctions
1.000 mi = 1.609 km; 1.000 km = 0.621 mi
