= Malacca State Route M117 =

Road in Malaysia

Melaka Route 117
- Jalan Permatang Tulang

Major junctions
- North end: Batu Gajah
- M14 Jalan Merlimau Darat; FT 5 AMJ Highway; FT 5 Federal route 5
- South end: Jalan Sungai Rambai

Location
- Country: Malaysia
- Primary destinations: Sebatu

Highway system
- Highways in Malaysia; Expressways; Federal; State

Jalan Permatang Tulang/Jalan Laidin/Jalan Ibrahim, Malacca State Route M117 is a major road in Malacca state, Malaysia

== Junction lists ==
The entire route is located in Jasin District, Malacca.

Location	km	mi	Name	Destinations	Notes
Merlimau			Batu Gajah	M14 Malacca State Route M14 – Merlimau, Sungai Rambai	T-junctions
Merlimau			AMJ Highway	FT 19 AMJ Highway – Alor Gajah, Malacca City, Jasin, Merlimau, Muar, Batu Pahat, Johor Bahru	Separated by AMJ Highway
Merlimau			Sebatu	FT 5 Malaysia Federal Route 5 – Alor Gajah, Malacca City, Jasin, Merlimau, Sungai Rambai, Muar, Batu Pahat, Johor Bahru	Junctions
Merlimau			Kampung Permatang Tulang		
Merlimau			Jalan Sungai Rambai	FT 5 Malaysia Federal Route 5 – Alor Gajah, Malacca City, Jasin, Merlimau, Sungai Rambai, Muar, Batu Pahat, Johor Bahru	T-junctions
1.000 mi = 1.609 km; 1.000 km = 0.621 mi: Incomplete access
