= MYDIN =

Malaysian supermarket chain

Mydin Mohamed Holdings Berhad
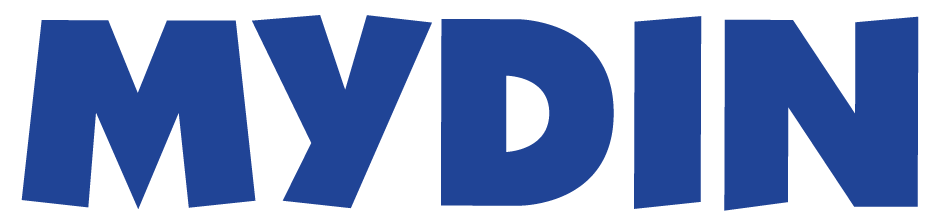

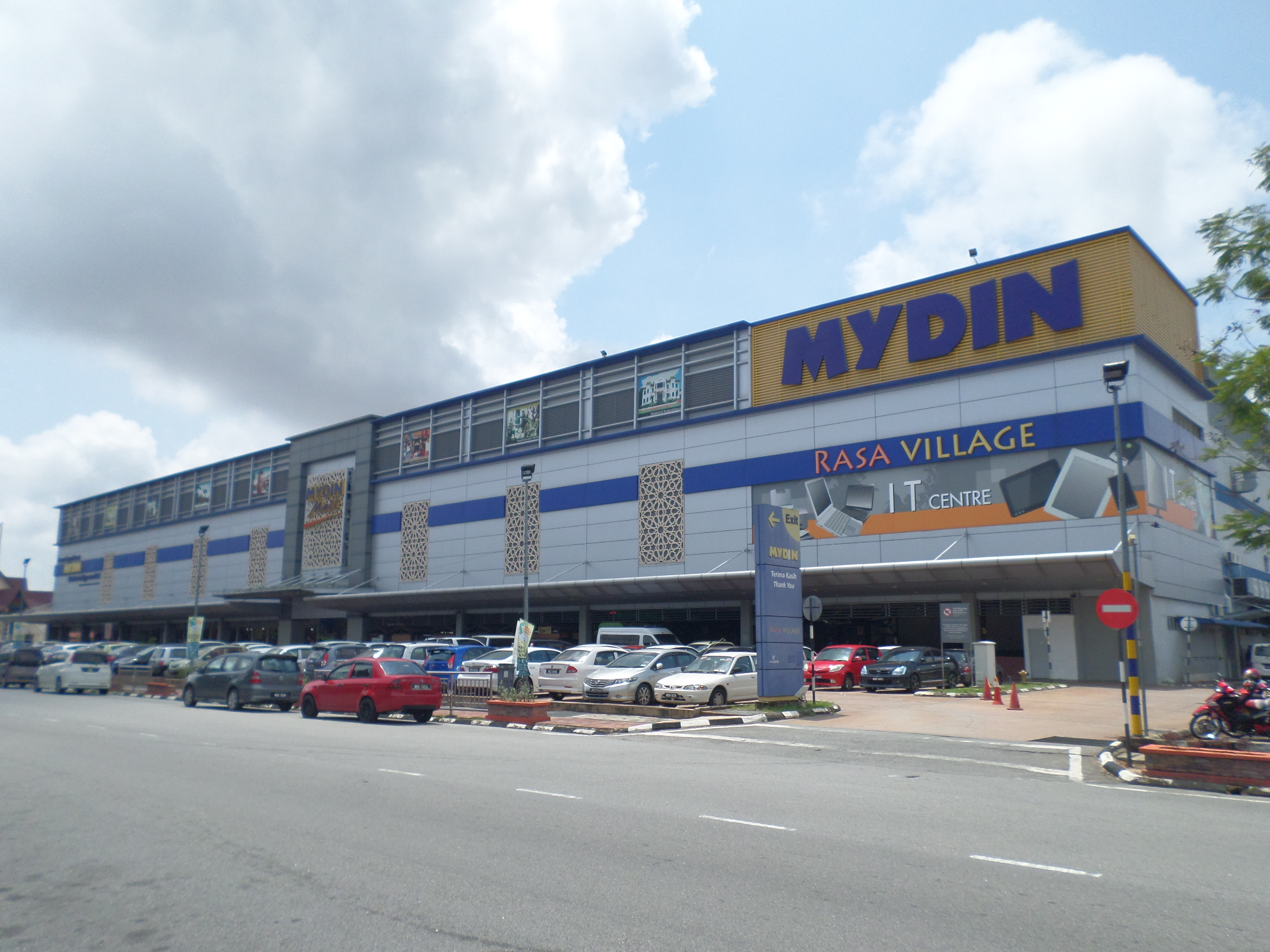
- Mydin Mall Ayer Keroh
- Trade name: MYDIN
- Type: Private
- Industry: Wholesale and Retail
- Founded: 5 August 1957; 69 years ago in Kota Bharu, Malaya
- Founder: Mydin Mohamed
- Headquarters: Subang Jaya, Selangor, Malaysia
- Number of locations: 71 outlets (2025)
- Key people: Ameer Ali Mydin, Managing Director
- Owner: Mydin Mohamed Holdings Berhad
- Website: www.mydin.com.my

Mydin Mohamed Holdings Berhad (MYDIN) is a Malaysian Halal hypermarket and retail chain.

== History ==
MYDIN was founded in August 1957 by Mydin Mohamed in Kota Bharu, Kelantan. The first shop was a small wooden shop in Jalan Tok Hakim, Kota Bharu, selling toys and general goods.

With the help of his children, he expanded the business to Kuala Terengganu in 1979 and later marked a step further by the opening of its first branch in Kuala Lumpur at Jalan Masjid India in 1989.

In 2013, MYDIN ventured into premium retail with the opening of SAM's Groceria; the words SAM's is an acronym for Saya Anak Malaysia. The first store opened at the Kuala Lumpur Sentral railway station.

To date, MYDIN has 71 branches nationwide, including 28 MYDIN Supermarkets, 17 MYDIN Emporiums, 3 MYDIN Bazaars, 3 MYDIN Mart franchises, 5 convenience stores operating as MyMart, 7 MYDIN supermarket and 2 premium stores known as SAM’S Groceria.

== List of stores ==
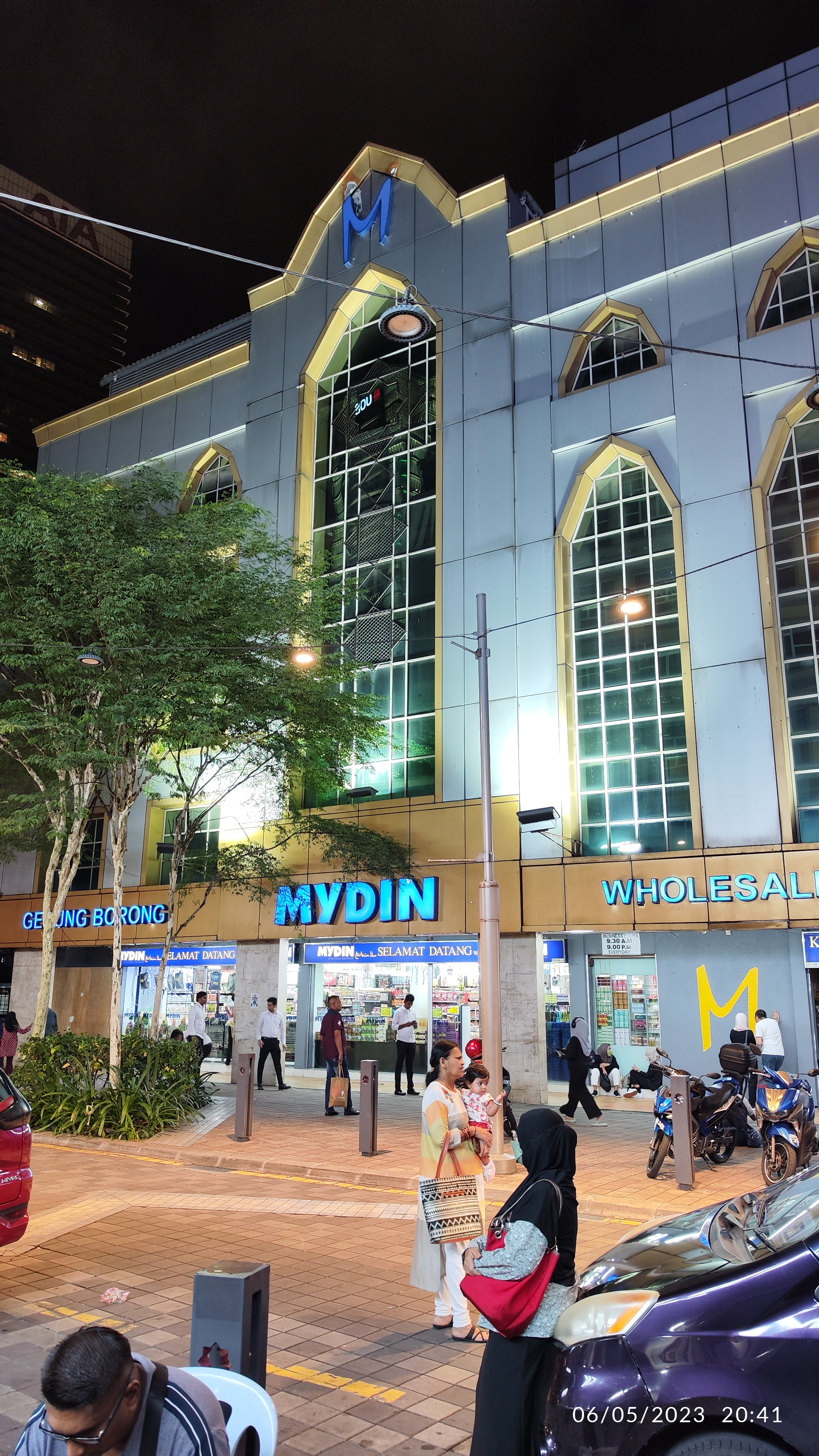
Mydin's first store in Kuala Lumpur, at Jalan Masjid India

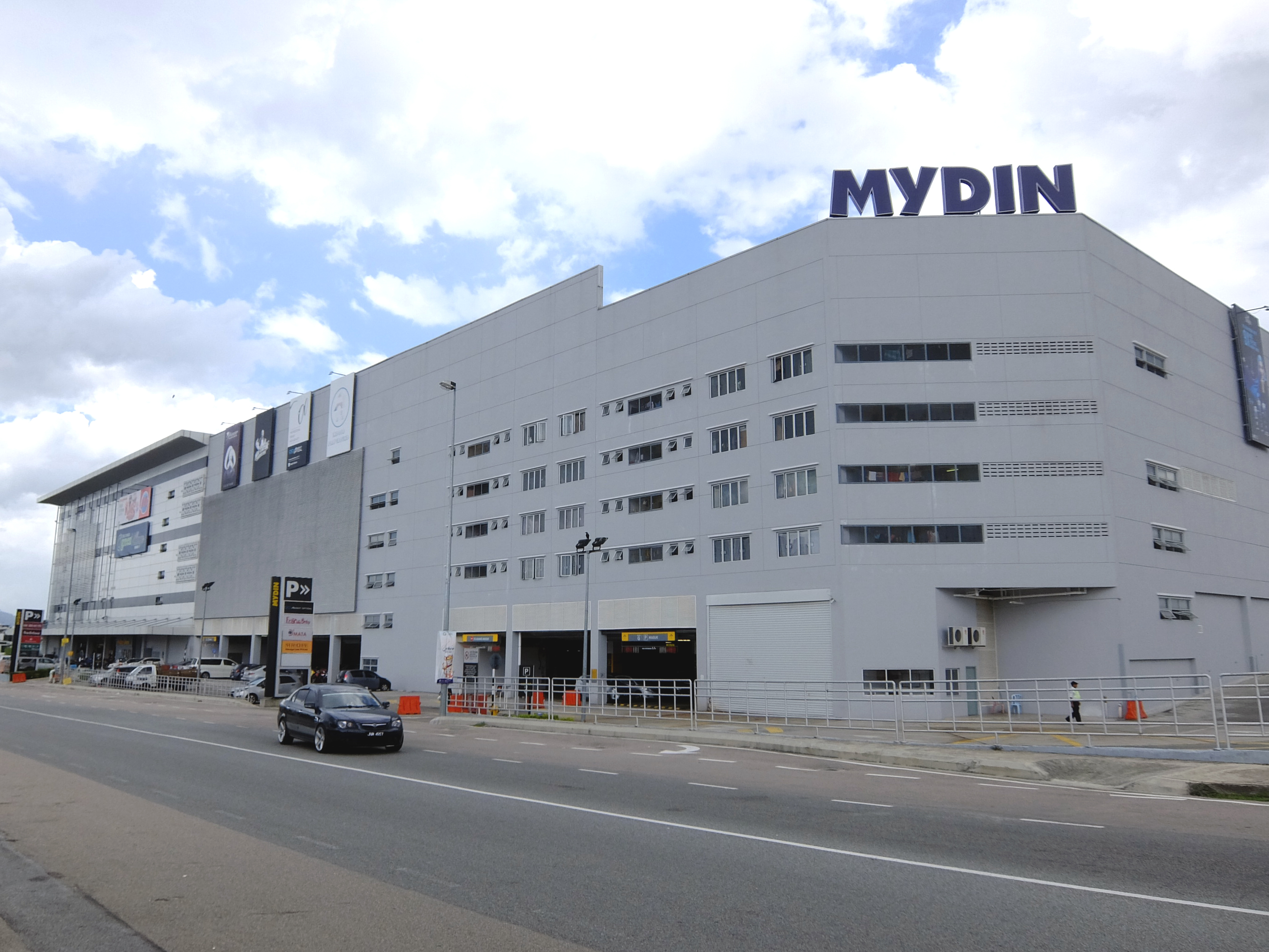
Mydin in Iskandar Puteri, Johor

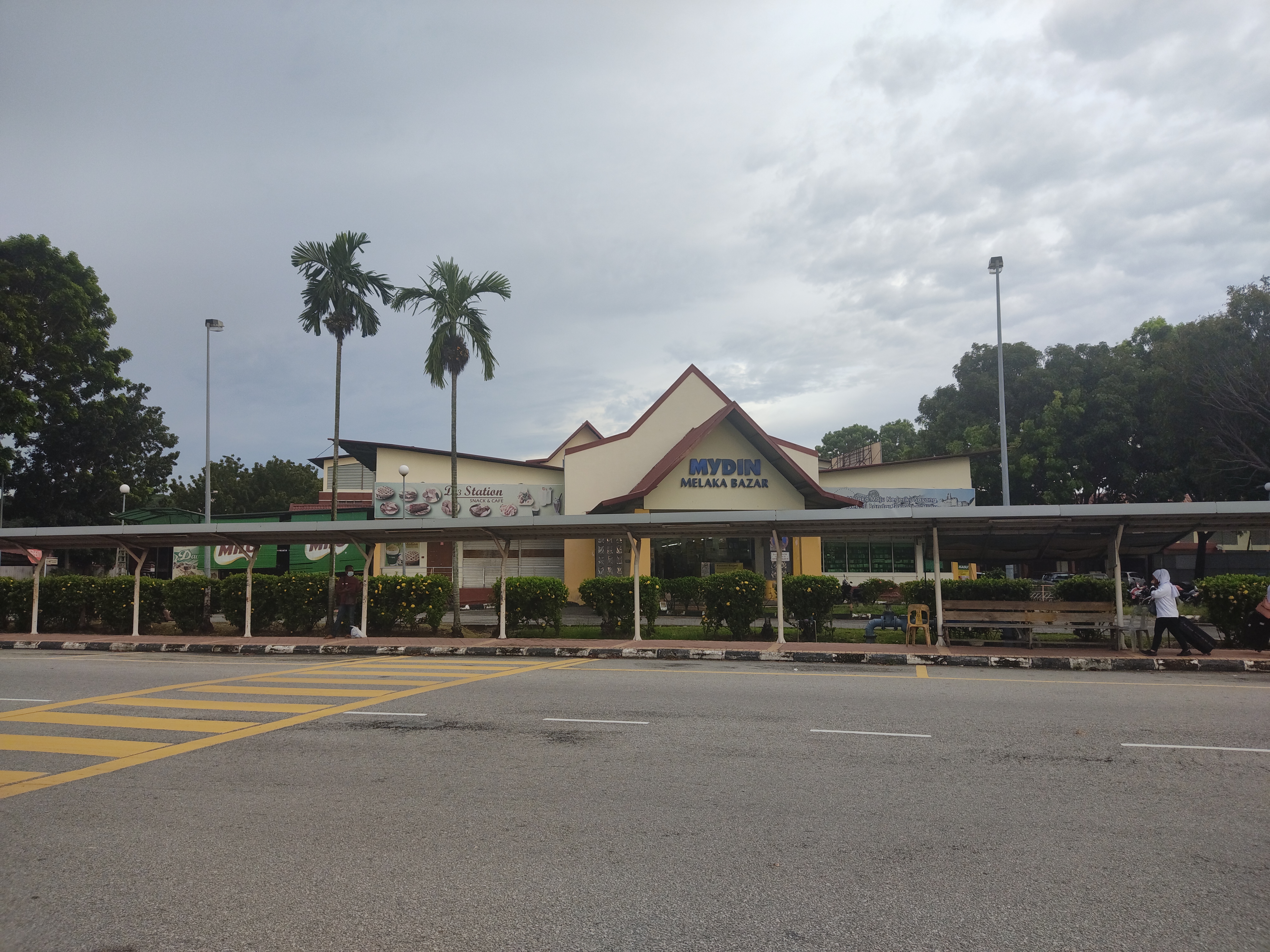
Mydin Bazaar in Melaka Sentral

This is a list of Mydin stores around Malaysia as of May 2021. Note that Emporiums and Mydin Marts operates as one wholesale supermarket, and is not located at retail mall buildings.

List of Mydin stores around Malaysia
Stores	Location	State
Central Peninsular Malaysia
Subang Jaya Hypermarket	USJ, Subang Jaya	Selangor
Semenyih Hypermarket	Bandar Teknologi Kajang, Kajang	Selangor
Putrajaya Bazaar	Diplomatic Precinct, Putrajaya	Federal Territories
Danau Saujana	Setapak, Kuala Lumpur	Federal Territories
Bukit Jelutong	Bukit Jelutong, Shah Alam	Selangor
Semenyih	Semenyih, Kajang	Selangor
Bangi	Bandar Baru Bangi, Kajang	Selangor
Puncak Jalil	Puncak Jalil, Seri Kembangan	Selangor
Lagenda Suria	Batu 14 Hulu Langat, Kajang	Selangor
Sinar Kota Emporium	Kuala Lumpur	Federal Territories
Selayang Emporium	Taman Selayang Utama, Selayang	Selangor
Masjid India Emporium	Kuala Lumpur	Federal Territories
Masjid India Emporium 2	Kuala Lumpur	Federal Territories
Chow Kit Emporium	Kuala Lumpur	Federal Territories
Tengku Kelana Emporium	Klang	Selangor
Kajang Emporium	Kajang	Selangor
Rawang Emporium	Rawang	Selangor
Klang Emporium	Klang	Selangor
Mydin Mart Padang Jawa	Padang Jawa, Shah Alam	Selangor
Mydin Mart Shah Alam	Section 18, Shah Alam	Selangor
Mydin Mart Sri Muda	Taman Sri Muda, Shah Alam	Selangor
North Peninsular Malaysia
Manjoi Hypermarket	Manjoi, Ipoh	Perak
Meru Raya Hypermarket	Bandar Meru Raya, Ipoh	Perak
Gopeng Hypermarket	Gopeng, Kampar	Perak
Parit Buntar Hypermarket	Parit Buntar	Perak
Taman Batik Hypermarket	Taman Batik, Sungai Petani	Kedah
Taman Saga Hypermarket	Taman Saga, Alor Setar	Kedah
Bukit Mertajam Hypermarket	Perai	Penang
Bukit Jambul Hypermarket	Bukit Jambul	Penang
Bandar Bertam Hypermarket	Kepala Batas	Penang
Wholesale Emporium Penang	George Town	Penang
South Peninsular Malaysia
Kulai Utama Hypermarket	Taman Kulai Utama, Kulai	Johor
Mutiara Rini Hypermarket	Mutiara Rini, Skudai	Johor
Taman Rinting Hypermarket	Taman Rinting, Masai	Johor
Pelangi Indah Hypermarket	Taman Pelangi Indah, Ulu Tiram	Johor
Bazaar Anjung Nusajaya	Iskandar Puteri	Johor
Senawang Hypermarket	Senawang, Seremban	Negeri Sembilan
Seremban 2 Hypermarket	Seremban 2, Seremban	Negeri Sembilan
Kota Seriemas	Kota Seriemas, Nilai	Negeri Sembilan
Melaka Hypermarket	MITC, Ayer Keroh	Melaka
Pulau Sebang Hypermarket	Pulau Sebang, Alor Gajah	Melaka
Jasin Hypermarket	Bandar Jasin Bestari, Jasin	Melaka
Melaka Emporium	Melaka City	Melaka
Melaka Bazaar	Melaka Sentral, Melaka City	Melaka
East Coast District
Tunjong Hypermarket	Tunjong	Kelantan
Kubang Kerian Hypermarket	Kubang Kerian, Kelantan	Kelantan
Kota Bharu Emporium	Kota Bharu	Kelantan
Rantau Panjang Emporium	Rantau Panjang, Pasir Mas	Kelantan
Jengka Hypermarket	Bandar Tun Razak, Maran	Pahang
Kuantan Emporium	Kuantan	Pahang
Pekan Emporium	Pekan	Pahang
Kuala Terengganu Hypermarket	Kuala Terengganu	Terengganu
Gong Badak Hypermarket	Gong Badak, Kuala Nerus	Terengganu
Kuala Terengganu Emporium	Kuala Terengganu	Terengganu
Kuala Ibai Emporium	Kuala Terengganu	Terengganu
Borneo District
Sejati Ujana Hypermarket	Sandakan	Sabah
Samariang Hypermarket	Samariang, Kuching	Sarawak
Vista Tunku Hypermarket	Petra Jaya, Kuching	Sarawak

== See also ==
- List of hypermarkets in Malaysia
