= Jalan Kesang Tasik =

Road in Malaysia

Malacca and Johor M112 and J60
- Jalan Kesang Tasik

Major junctions
- West end: Kampung Parit Perawas
- M14 Jalan Merlimau Darat; FT 23 Federal Route 23
- East end: Sungai Mati

Location
- Country: Malaysia
- Primary destinations: Sungai Rambai, Kesang Tasik

Highway system
- Highways in Malaysia; Expressways; Federal; State

Jalan Kesang Tasik (Malacca State Route M112 and Johor State Route J60) is a major road in Malacca and Johor state, Malaysia. It is a section in Malaysia Federal Route 5 (FT5) and Federal Route 23 (FT23).

== Junction lists ==
State	District	Location	km	mi	Name	Destinations	Notes
Malacca	Jasin	Kampung Parit Perawas			Kampung Parit Perawas	M14 Jalan Merlimau Darat – Merlimau, Batu Gajah, Sungai Rambai, Malacca	T-junctions
Malacca	Jasin	Kampung Teluk Gong			Kampung Teluk Gong		
Malacca–Johor border					Kesang River bridge		
Johor	Tangkak	Sungai Mati			Kampung Tasik		
Johor	Tangkak	Sungai Mati			Kesang Tasik		
Johor	Tangkak	Sungai Mati			Sungai Mati	FT 23 Malaysia Federal Route 23 – Tangkak, Jementah, Segamat, Bukit Gambir, Muar; North–South Expressway Southern Route / AH2 – Kuala Lumpur, Johor Bahru	T-junctions
1.000 mi = 1.609 km; 1.000 km = 0.621 mi
