= Lipat Kajang =

Village in Malacca state, Malaysia

Lipat Kajang is a small village in Jasin District in the Malaysian state of Malacca located near the town of Jasin. Elkay Industrial Park, formerly known as the Lipat Kajang Industrial Park, is the village's main industrial area. Notable tenants include Xinyi Solar (Malaysia) Sdn Bhd, a subsidiary of global leading glass manufacturer – Xinyi Glass Holdings Limited.
