= Portuguese Well =

Former water well in Jasin, Malacca, Malaysia

- Perigi Portugis
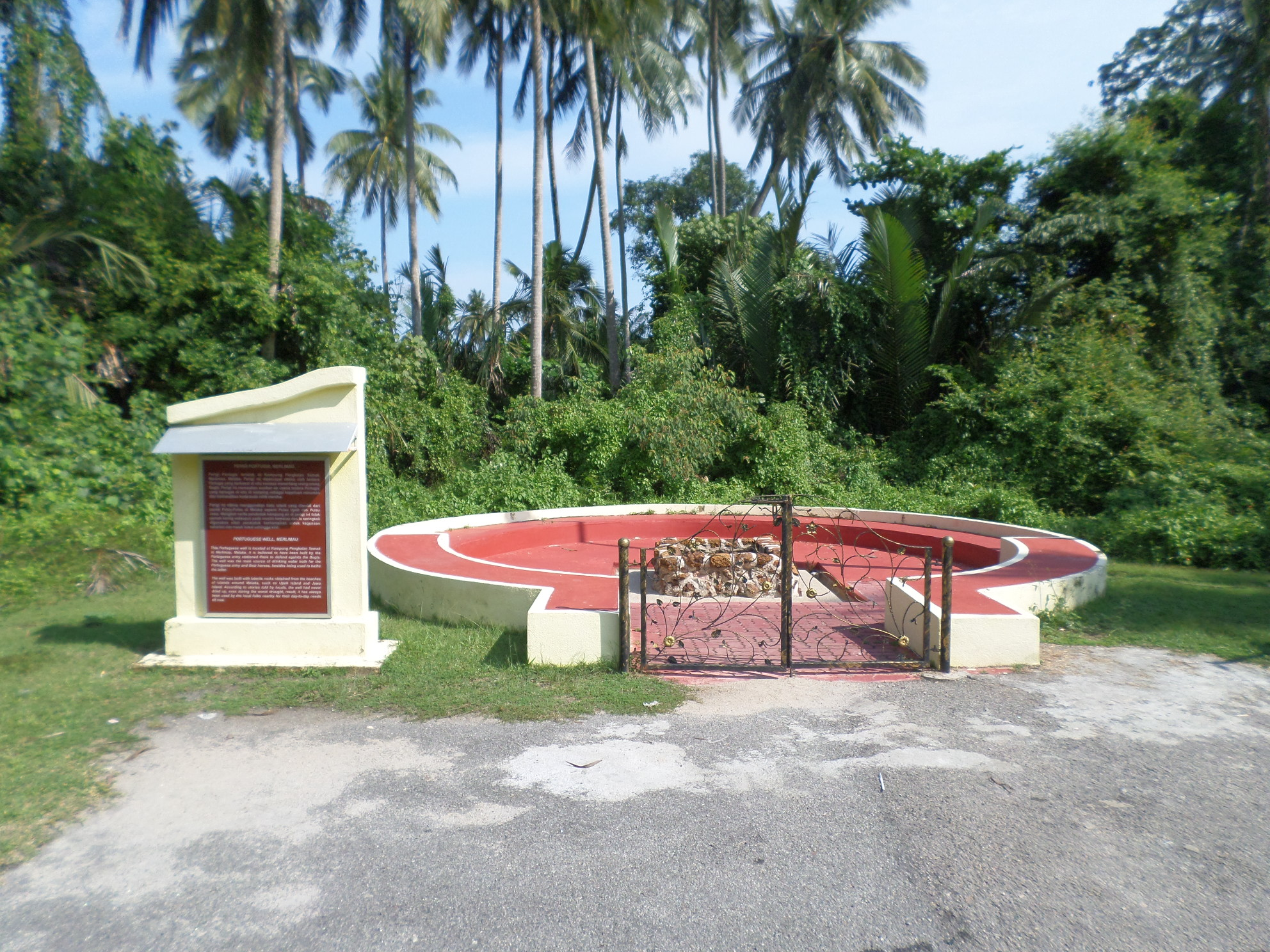
- Interactive map of the Portuguese Well area

General information
- Type: former water well
- Location: Merlimau, Jasin, Malacca, Malaysia
- Coordinates: 2°07′47.0″N 102°25′07.1″E

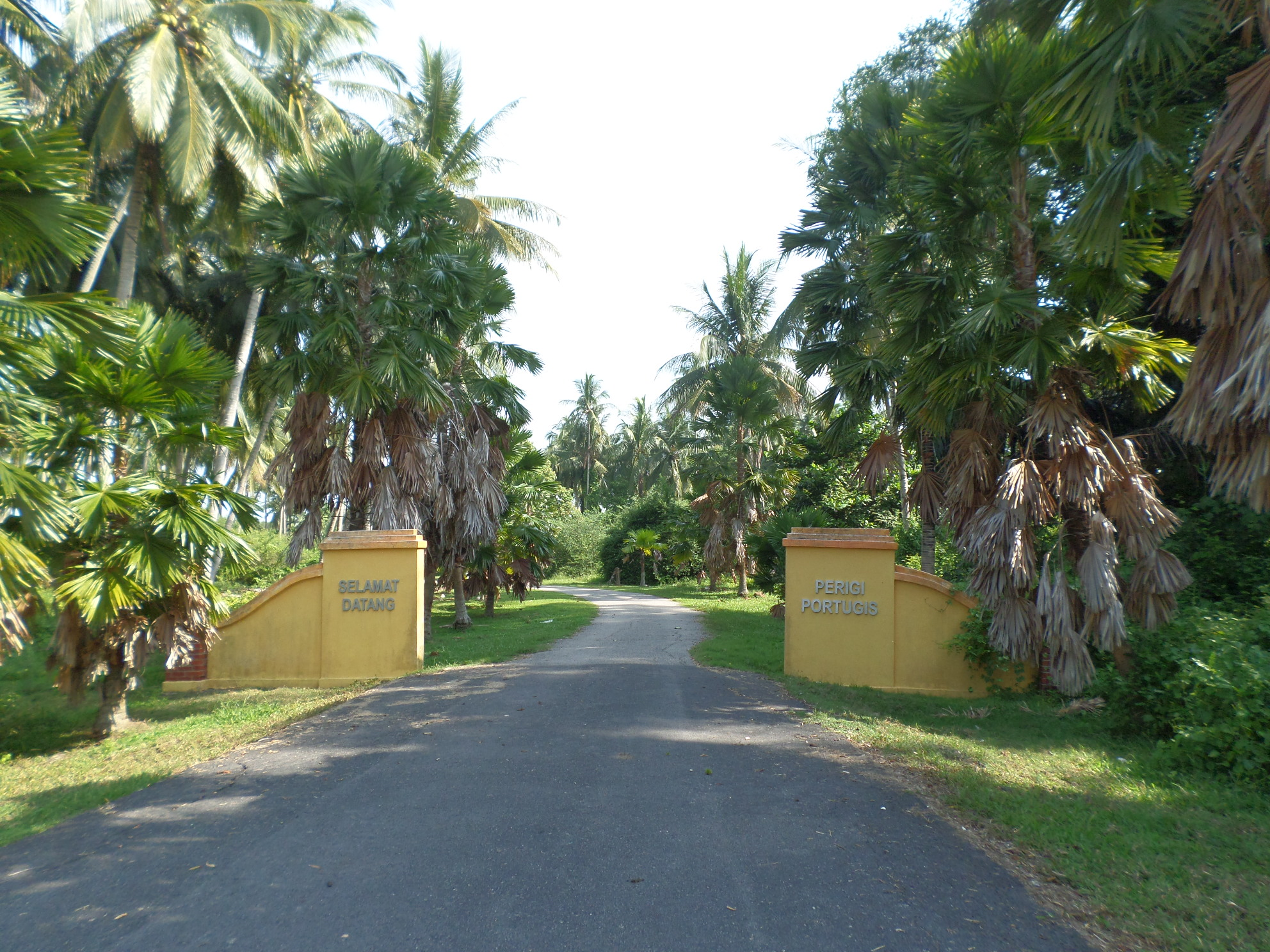
Portuguese Well entrance gate

Portuguese Well (Malay: Perigi Portugis) is a water well in Kampung Pengkalan Samak, Merlimau, Jasin District, Malacca, Malaysia, which was built with laterite rocks obtained from the beaches. The well was dug by the Portuguese during their rule in Malacca as the water source for the soldiers when they were stationed here to protect Merlimau from the attack which came from Muar.

== See also ==
- List of tourist attractions in Malacca
