= Jasin Hot Spring =

Hot spring in Jasin, Melaka, Malaysia

- Kolam Air Panas Jasin
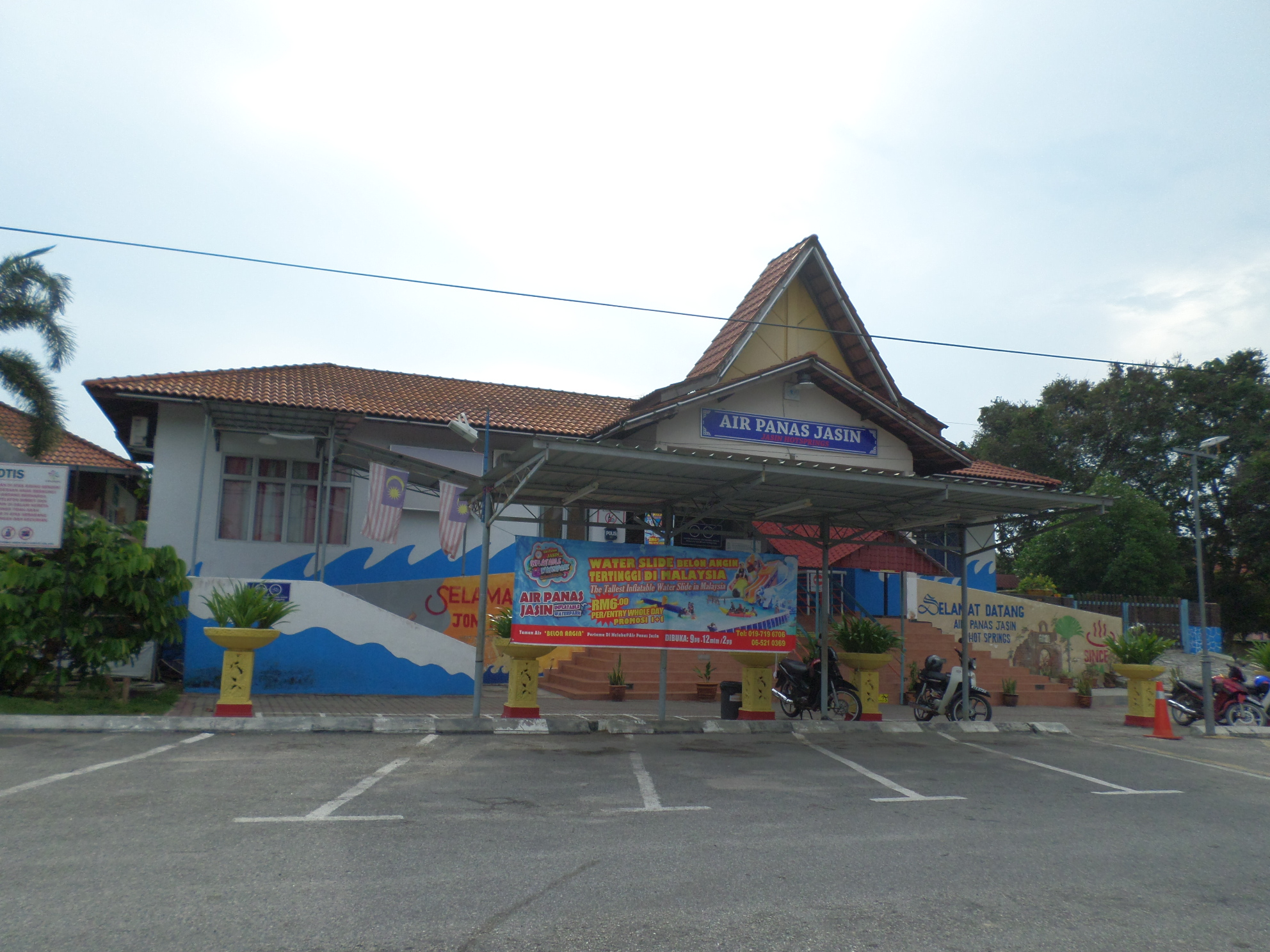
- Interactive map of Jasin Hot Spring
- Location: Bemban, Jasin, Melaka, Malaysia
- Coordinates: 2°17′27.9″N 102°22′36.0″E
- Type: hot spring

The Jasin Hot Spring (Malay: Kolam Air Panas Jasin) is a hot spring in Bemban, Jasin District, Melaka, Malaysia.

== History ==
The hot spring was originally established by businessman Tan Kim Tean from Singapore on 8 May 1884 as a public bathing house.

== Architecture ==
The hot spring compound covers an area of 1.2 hectares.

== Opening time ==
The hot spring opens everyday except Monday from 9.00 a.m. to 12.00 a.m.

== See also ==
- Geography of Malaysia
