= Bandar Jasin Bestari =

Suburb in Jasin, Melaka, Malaysia

Coordinates: 2°19′N 102°26′E

Bandar Jasin Bestari (Jasin Smart City) is a residential neighbourhood in the town of Bemban of Jasin District, in the Malaysian state of Malacca developed by Malacca Customary Land Corporation (PERTAM).
