= Agricultural Museum (Malaysia) =

Museum in Jasin, Malacca, Malaysia

- Muzium Pertanian
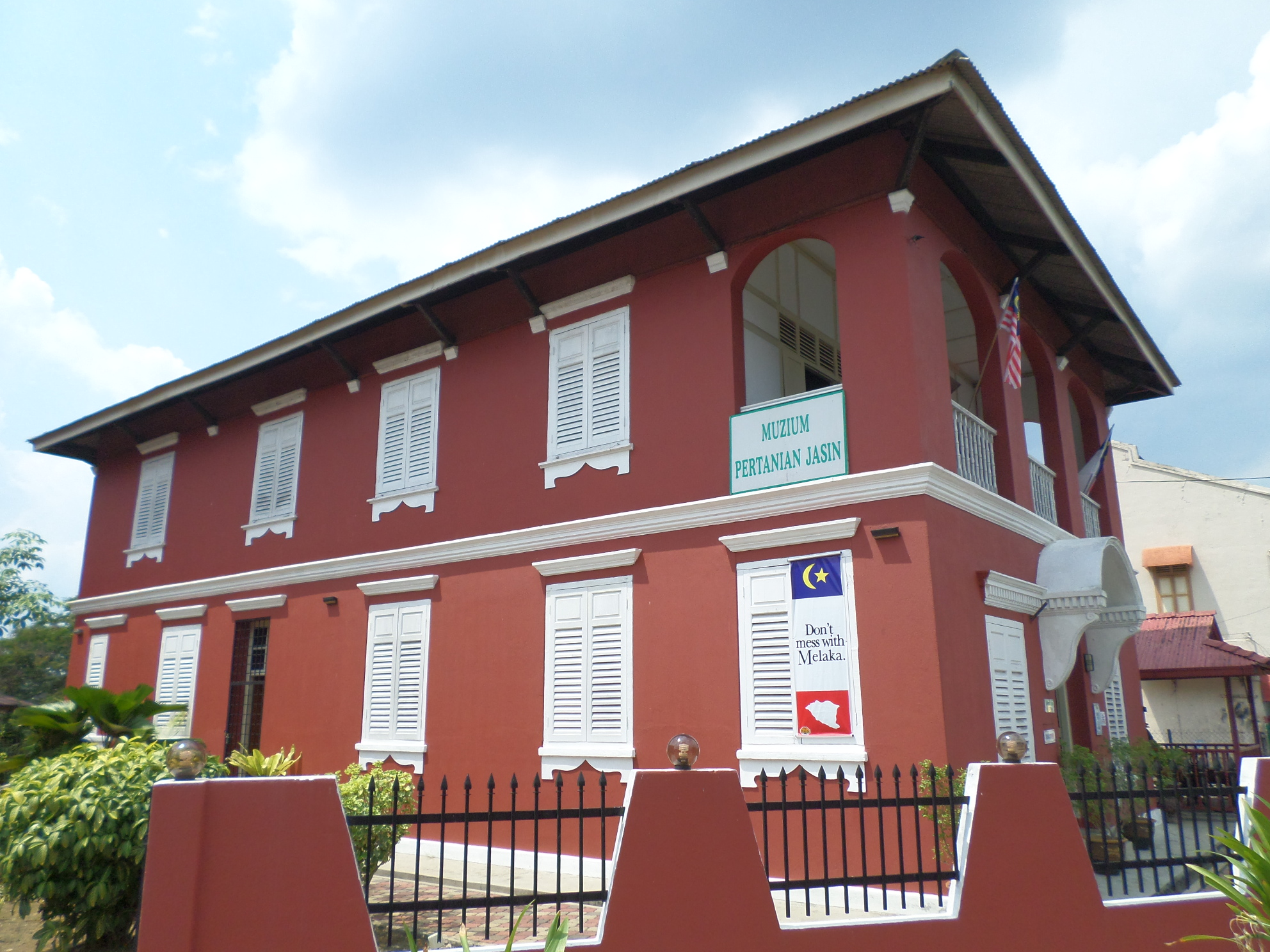
- Established: October 1990
- Location: Jasin, Malacca, Malaysia
- Coordinates: 2°18′36.4″N 102°25′52.6″E
- Type: museum

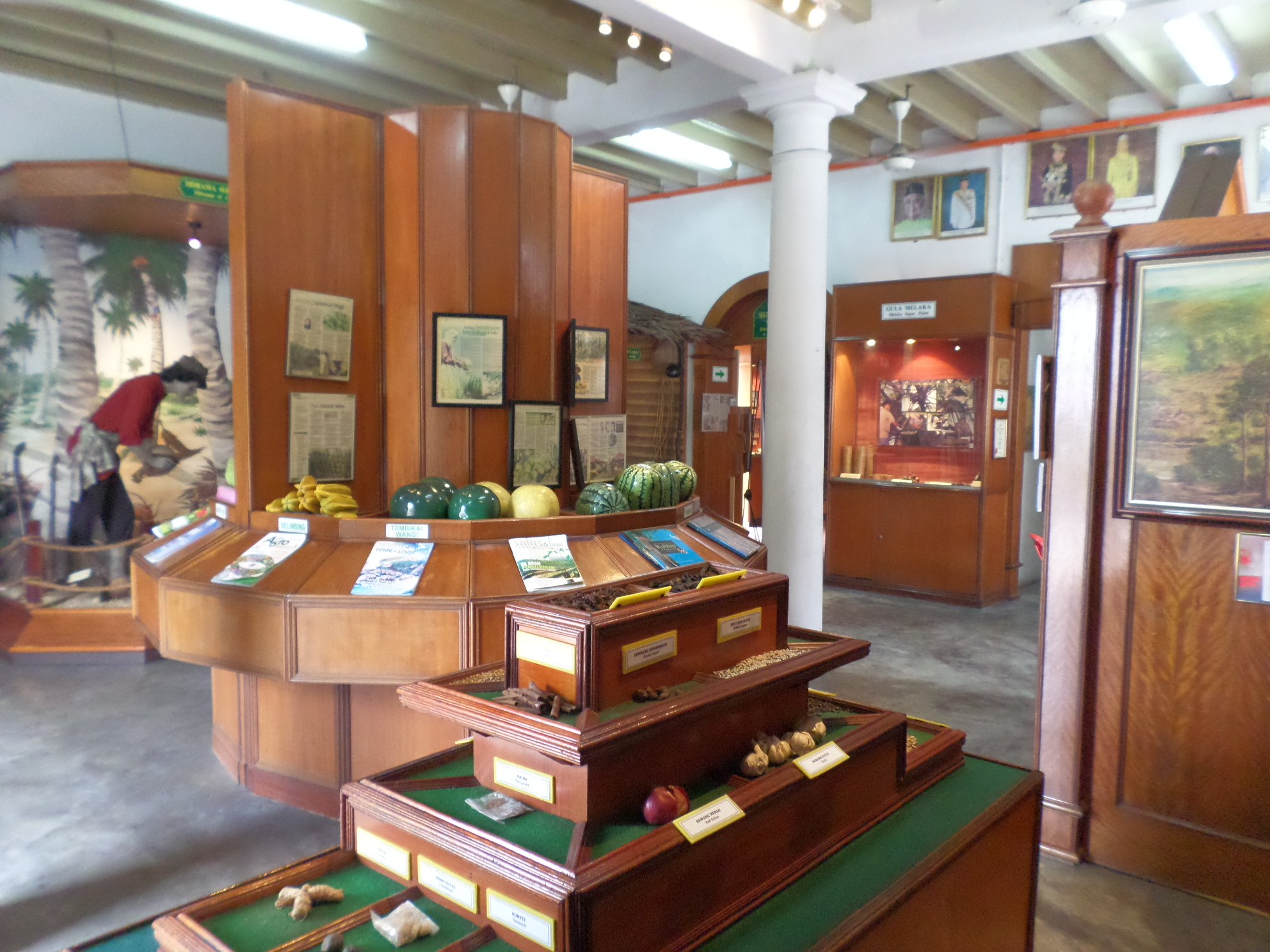
Agriculture Museum exhibition hall

Agricultural Museum (Malay: Muzium Pertanian) is a museum about agriculture in Jasin Town, Jasin District, Malacca, Malaysia. The museum building was originally the first post office in Jasin Town before it was converted into a museum, which opened to the public in October 1990. The museum displays the historical activities and the economy of the local Jasin people, especially in the fields of agriculture.

== See also ==
- List of museums in Malaysia
- List of tourist attractions in Malacca
- Agriculture in Malaysia
