= Bemban =

Town in Malacca, Malaysia

Bemban Bemban
- Town
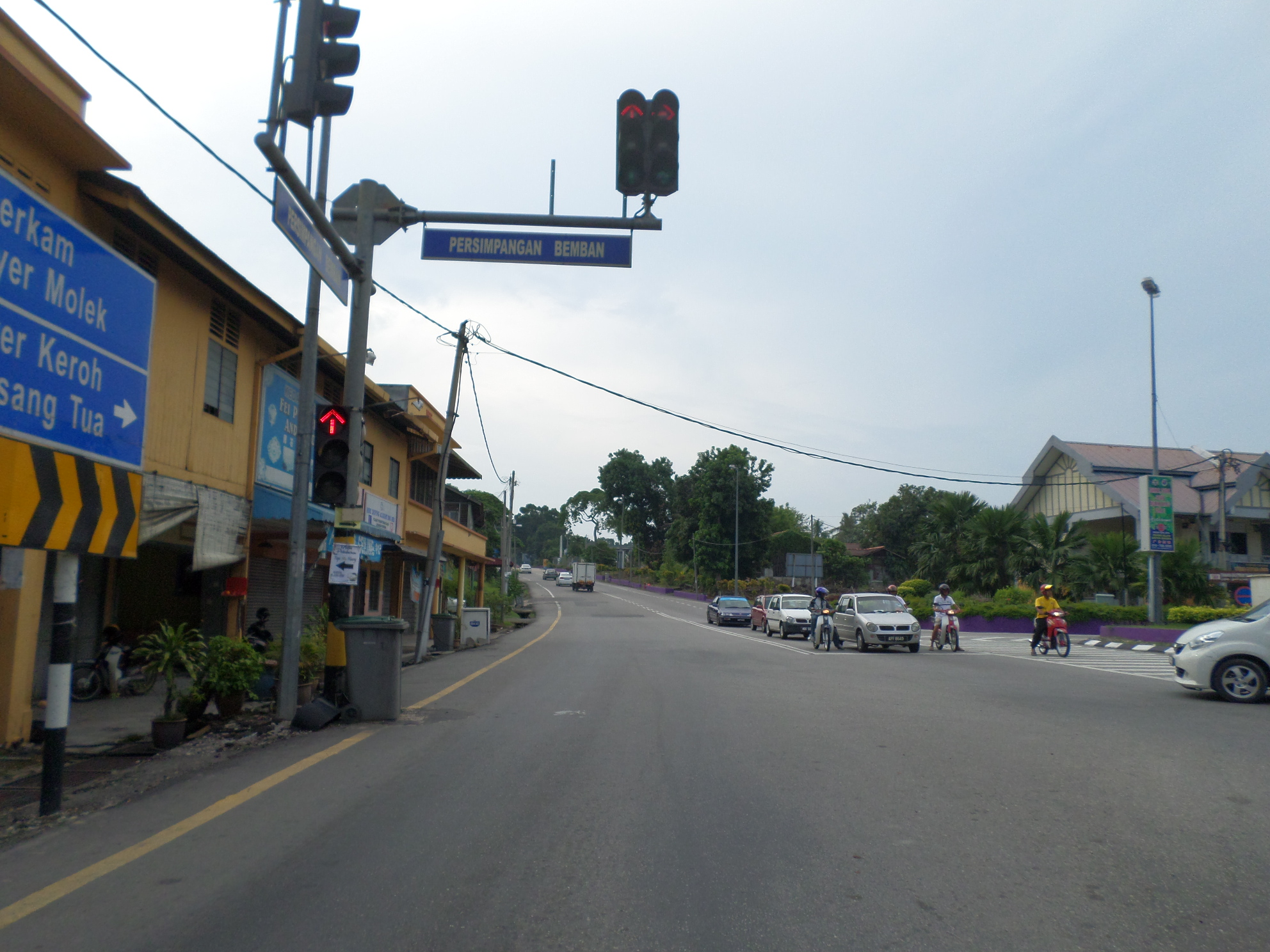
- Y-Junction at the Town Centre
- Interactive map of Bemban
- Coordinates: 2°16′12″N 102°22′48″E
- Country: Malaysia
- State: Malacca
- District: Jasin

Area
  - Total: 69.11 km^{2} (26.68 sq mi)
- Time zone: UTC+8 (MST)
  - Summer (DST): Not observed
- Postal code: 77200

Bemban is a small town in Jasin District in the Malaysian state of Malacca.

== Economy ==
- Mydin Hypermarket Bandar Jasin Bestari

== Residential neighbourhoods ==
- Bandar Jasin Bestari

== Sports and recreation ==
- Orna Golf and Country Club - A golf resort owned and managed by Orna Resort Berhad.

== Tourist attractions ==
- Jasin Hot Spring

== See also ==
- Jasin District
- List of cities and towns in Malaysia by population
