= Jasin Square =

Town square in Jasin Town, Melaka, Malaysia

- Town square
- Dataran Jasin
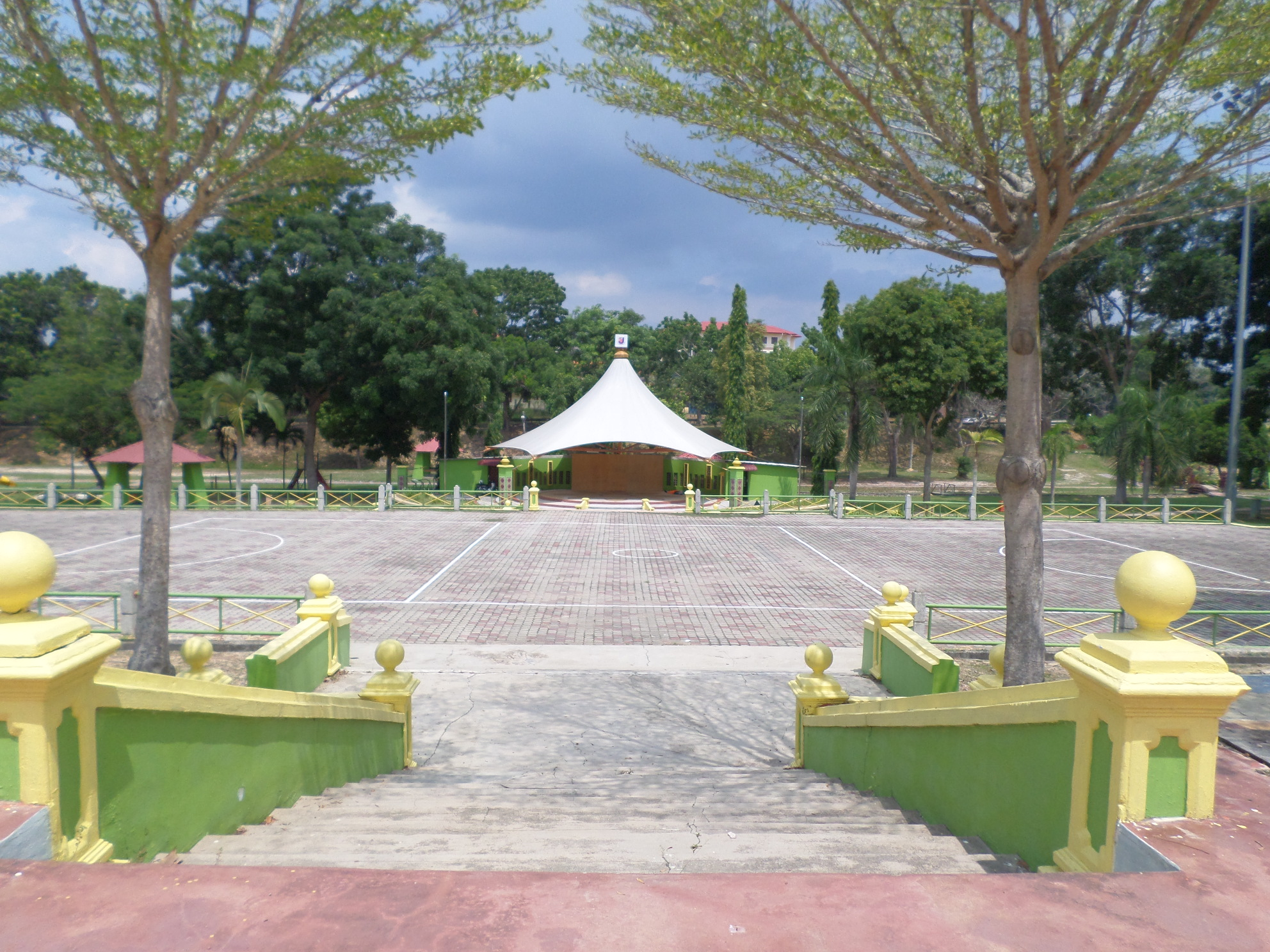
- Location: Jasin, Melaka, Malaysia
- Location within Malacca
- Coordinates: 2°18′18.6″N 102°25′20.2″E

The Jasin Square (Malay: Dataran Jasin) is a town square in Jasin Town, Jasin District, Melaka, Malaysia.

== Architecture ==
The square features facilities such as reflection place, playground, stage, rest hut and extreme sport area.

== See also ==
- List of tourist attractions in Melaka
