= Jasin (town) =

Town in Jasin District, Malacca, Malaysia

- Town and district capital
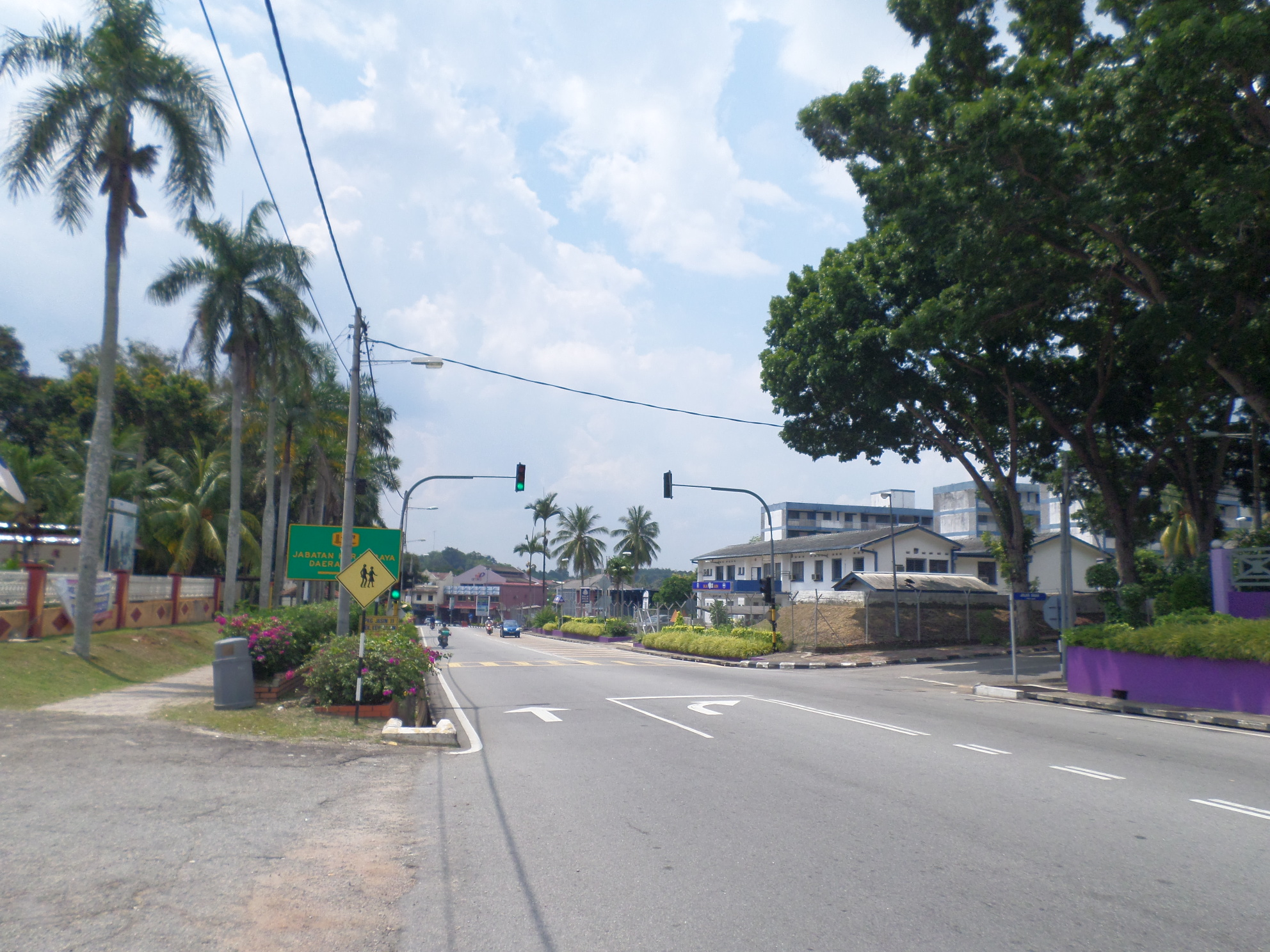
- Traffic lights at a street in Jasin town, the former headquarters of the Municipal Council is on the right.

- Emblem

- Location within Malacca Location within Peninsular Malaysia
- Coordinates: 2°18′38″N 102°25′52″E
- Country: Malaysia
- State: Malacca
- District: Jasin
- Granted municipality status: 1 January 2007

Government
  - Type: Local government
  - Body: Jasin Municipal Council
  - President: Rosemanizam Mohd Nalif@Zawawi

Population (2001)
  - Total: 92,883
- Time zone: UTC+8 (MST)
  - Summer (DST): Not observed
- Website: www.mpjasin.gov.my

Jasin Municipal Council Majlis Perbandaran Jasin

Type
- Type: Local authority

History
- Founded: 1 January 2007

Leadership
- President: Rosemanizam Mohd Nalif@Zawawi
- Municipal Secretary: Muhammad Zahiruddin Mohd Zahari

Meeting place
- Vista Alamanda, 77000 Jasin, Malacca

Website
- www.mpjasin.gov.my

Jasin is a town and the seat of Jasin District, Malacca, Malaysia. It is governed by Jasin Municipal Council (Malay: Majlis Perbandaran Jasin), which was formerly known as Jasin District Council (Malay: Majlis Daerah Jasin) from 1 July 1978 until 1 January 2007 and the Jasin Rural District Council (Malay: Majlis Daerah Luar Bandar Jasin) from 23 August 1957 until 1 July 1978.

== Economy ==
- Jasin Industrial Park has an area of over 202 acres (82 ha), mainly housing light and medium industries.

== Tourist attractions ==
- Agricultural Museum
- Jasin Square

== Transportation ==
The Jasin Sentral bus station is the main transportation hub of this town and the district itself.

== Gallery ==
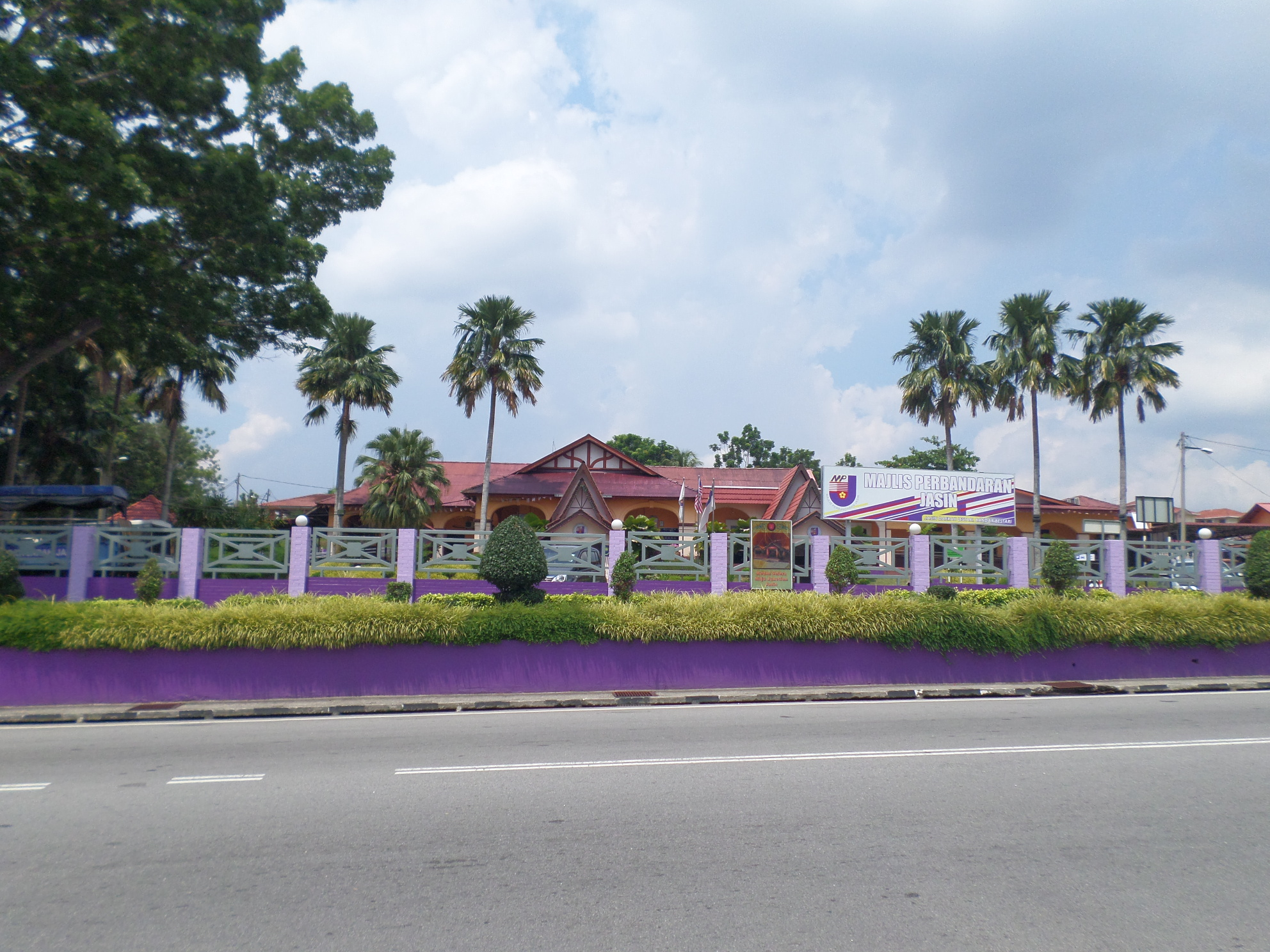
Former Jasin Municipal Council Headquarters

== See also ==
- Alor Gajah
- Hang Tuah Jaya
- Malacca City
