= Sungai Rambai =

Town in Jasin, Malacca, Malaysia

- town
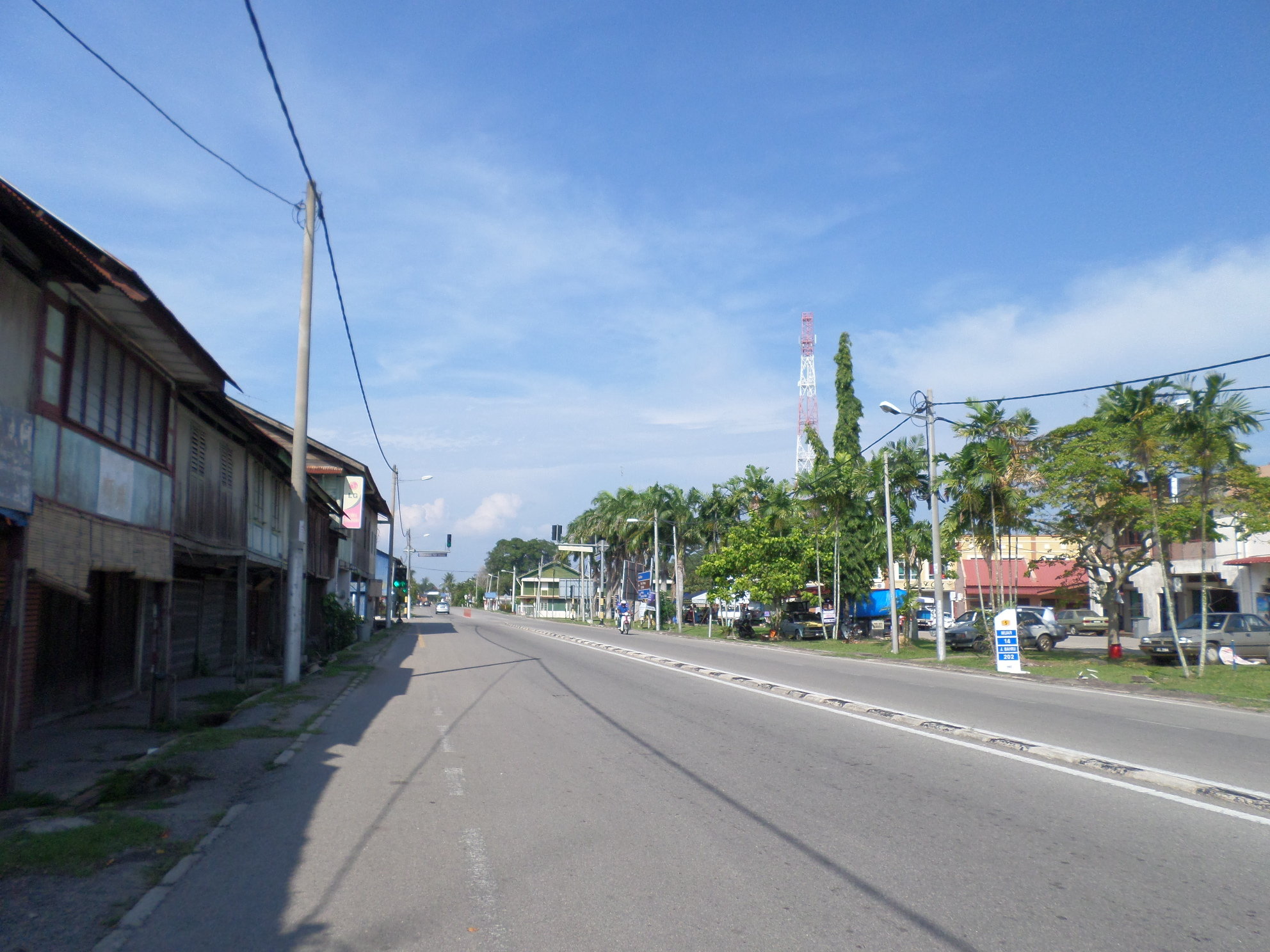

- Location within Malacca Location within Peninsular Malaysia
- Coordinates: 2°07′N 102°30′E
- Country: Malaysia
- State: Malacca
- District: Jasin

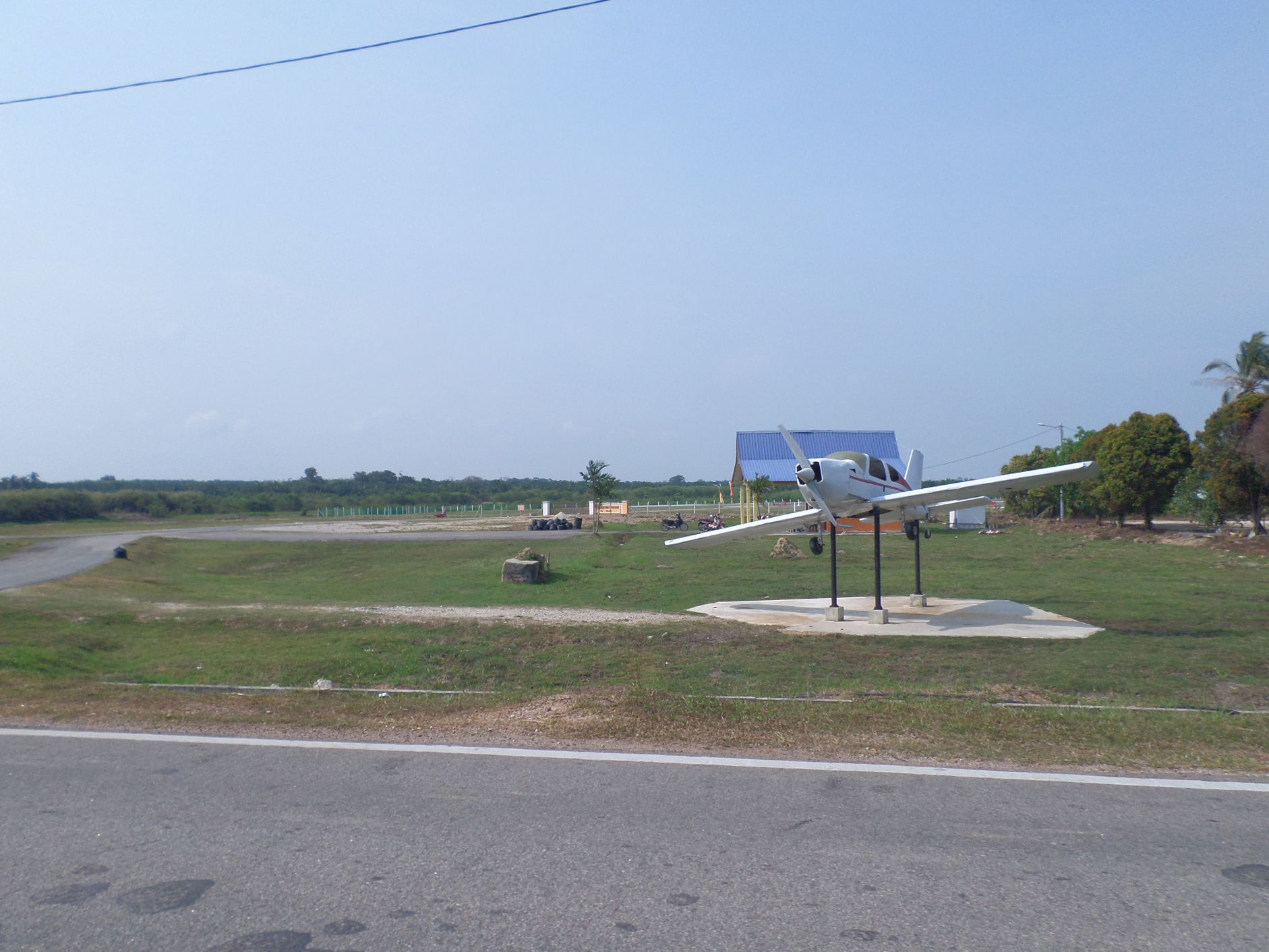
Sungai Rambai Aerodrome

Sungai Rambai is a town located in Jasin District, Malacca, Malaysia, next to the border of Johor at Kesang River.

== Administration ==
Sungai Rambai was made an autonomous subdistrict (daerah kecil) in March 2017 but the autonomy was revoked after the 2018 elections.

== Politics ==
Sungai Rambai is also a state constituency in the Malacca State Legislative Assembly.

== Infrastructures ==
- Sungai Rambai Aerodrome - General aviation airstrip for light aircraft, such as Cessna 172.
- Sungai Rambai Recreational Park
- Halaman Dewan Rambai d'Istana
- Youth Movement Centre (Malay: Pusat Gerakan Belia)
