= Merlimau =

Town in Jasin, Melaka, Malaysia

- Town
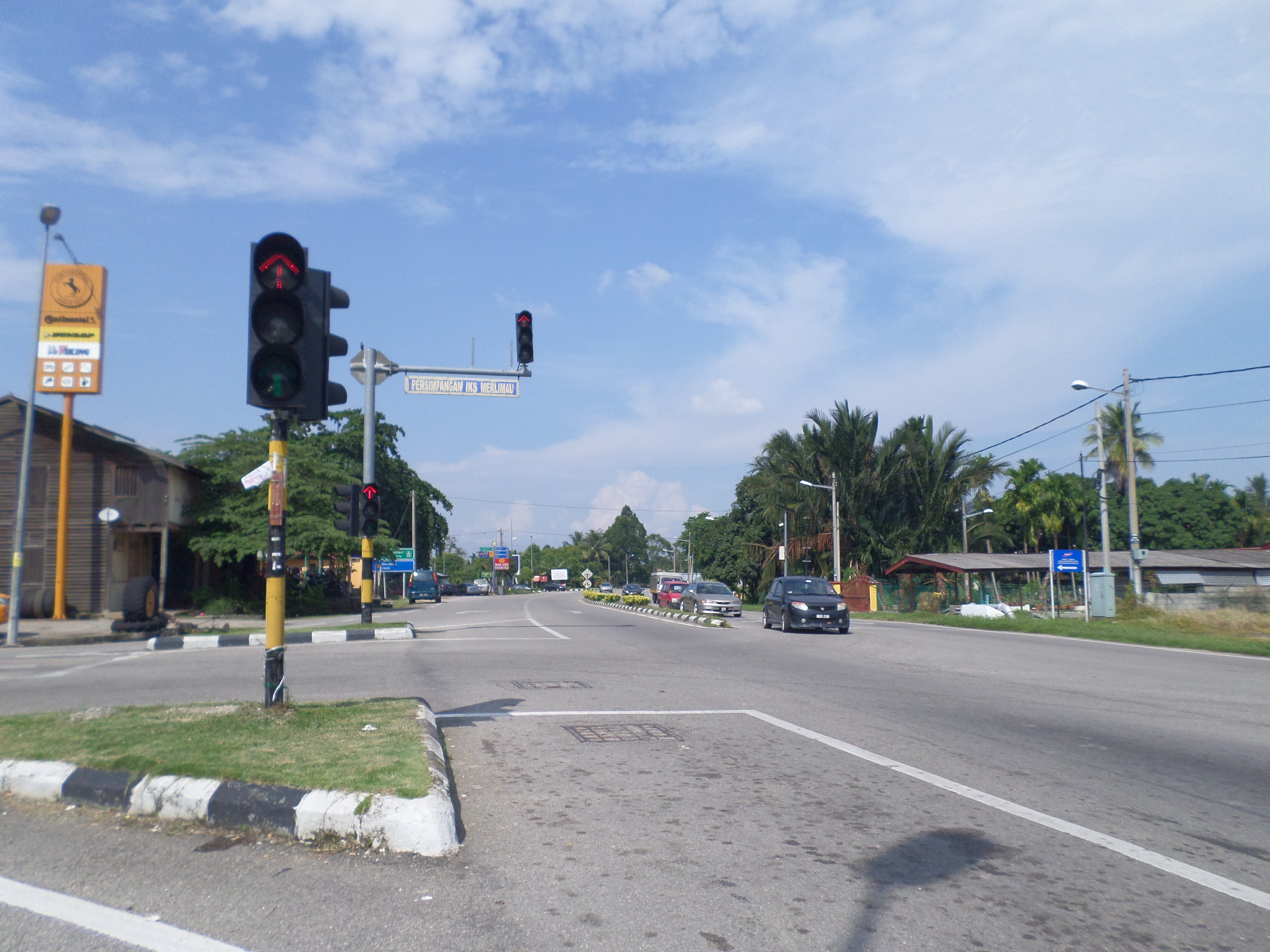

- Location within Malacca Location within Peninsular Malaysia
- Coordinates: 2°09′N 102°26′E
- Country: Malaysia
- State: Malacca
- District: Jasin

Merlimau is a mukim and town in Jasin District, Malacca, Malaysia. Politically, it is situated in the parliament constituency of P139 Jasin, and state constituency of N27 Merlimau, which consists of seven ballot box areas, namely Ayer Merbau, Chincin, Jasin Lalang, Merlimau Utara, Merlimau Pasir, Permatang Serai, and Pengkalan Samak.

== Economy ==
- Merlimau Industrial Area

== Education ==
- Merlimau Polytechnic (Malay: Politeknik Merlimau)
- Universiti Teknologi MARA Malacca Branch Jasin Campus (Malay: Universiti Teknologi MARA Cawangan Melaka Kampus Jasin)

== Tourist attractions ==
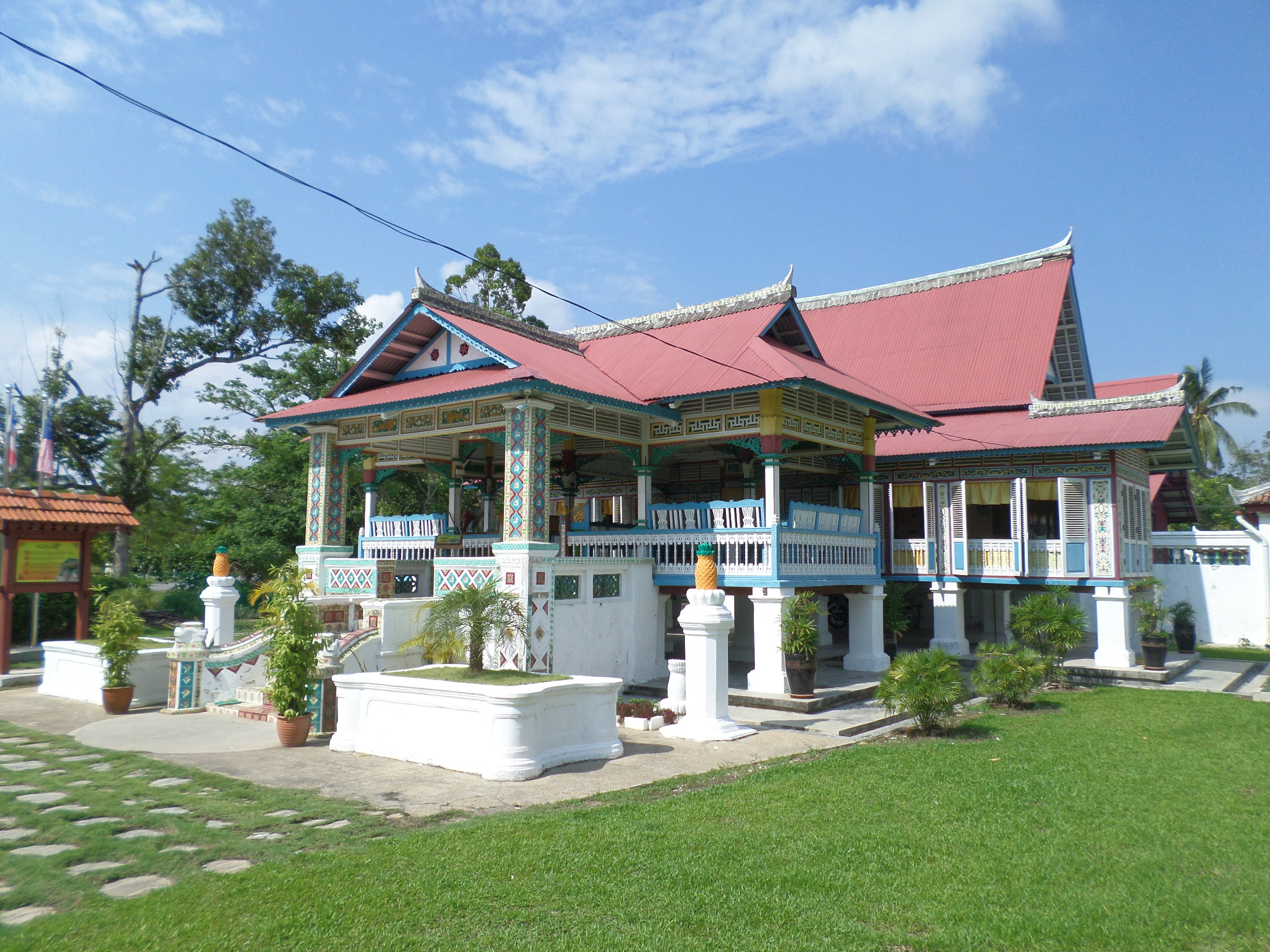
Demang Abdul Ghani Gallery

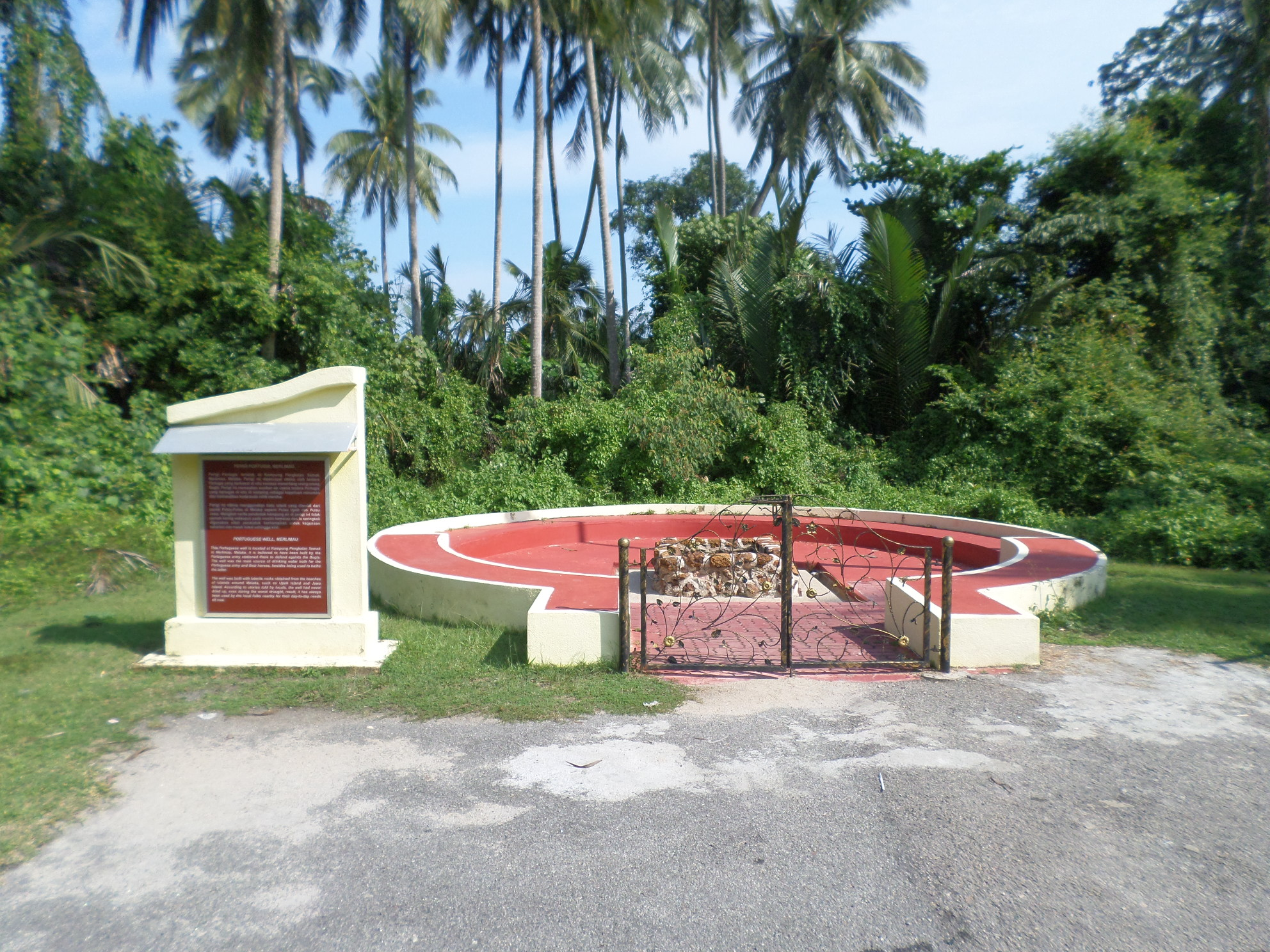
Portuguese Well

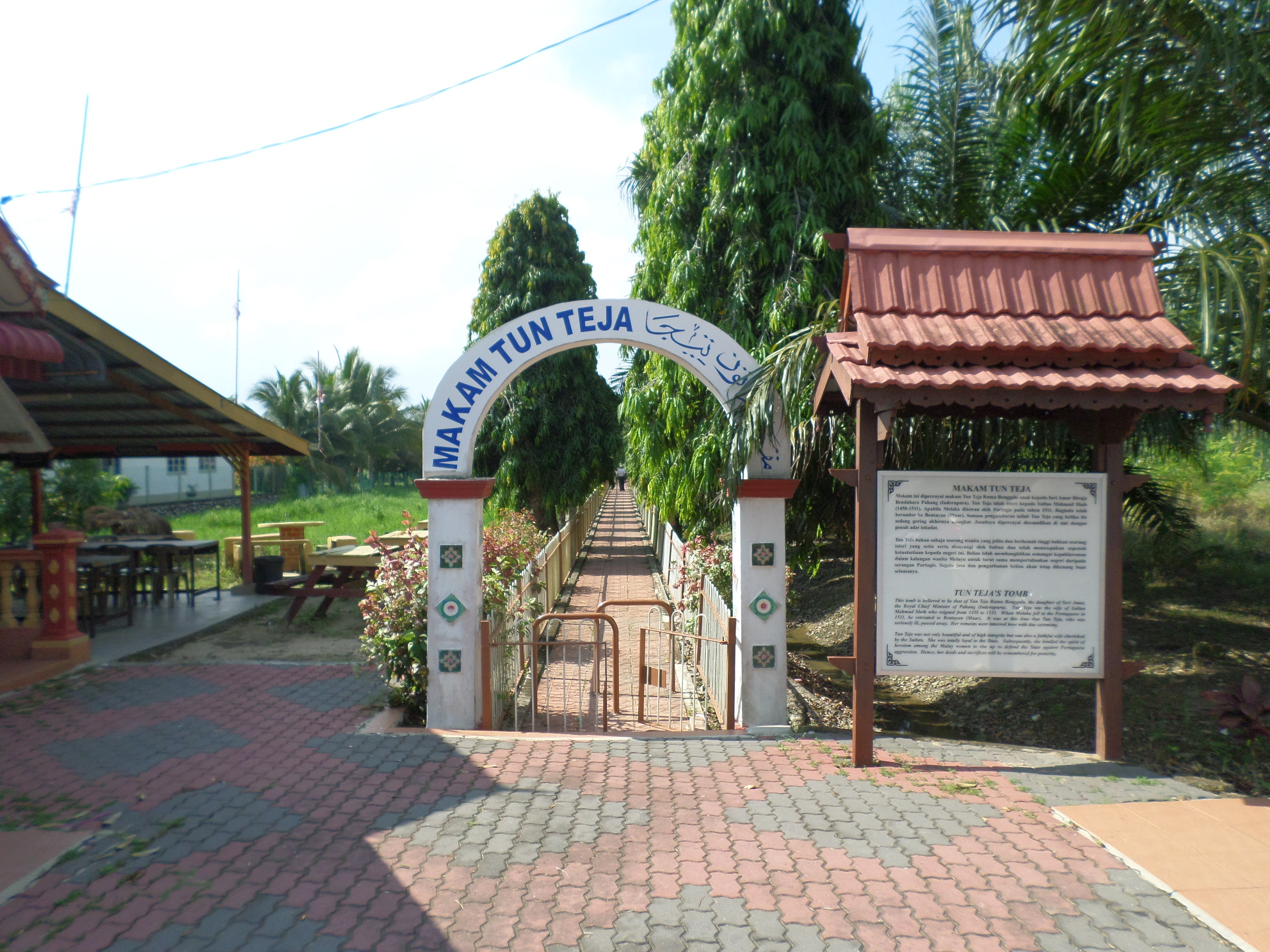
Tun Teja Mausoleum

- Demang Abdul Ghani Gallery - A gallery opened in February 2011 and used to be the house of Demang Abdul Ghani, whose ancestor came from Palembang and his family. Built in 1831, its first known occupants were people of Abdul Majid's generation. The building, sometimes called the Merlimau Palace, was the administrative centre of the village in the past and often used as a meeting place to discuss community affairs.
- Portuguese Well - A water well in Kampung Pengkalan Samak which was built with laterite rocks obtained from the beaches. The well was dug by the Portuguese soldiers during Portuguese rule in Malacca as their water source when they were stationed at the town to protect it from the attack which came from Muar.
- Tun Teja Mausoleum - The burial place of Tun Teja Ratna Benggala, consort of Sultan Mahmud Shah who ruled Malacca from 1458 to 1511. She was believed to have died on the way to Muar, Johor, when the sultan was escaping the invasion of the Portuguese in 1511 and was buried at Kampung Pengkalan Samak. The mausoleum is located in the middle of a paddy field, with her tomb painted in white and the headstone is covered with yellow cloths.

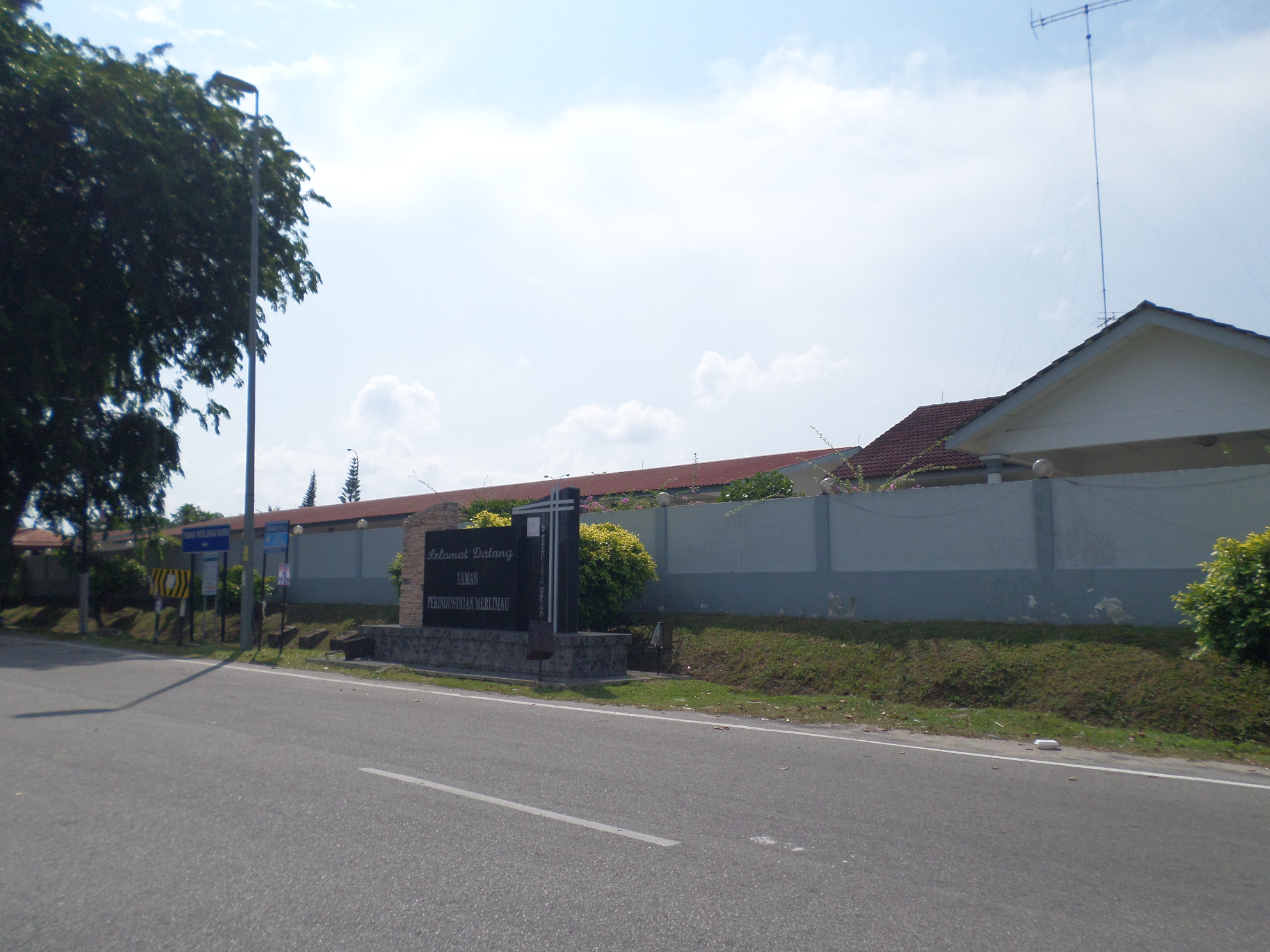
Merlimau Industrial Area

== Gallery ==
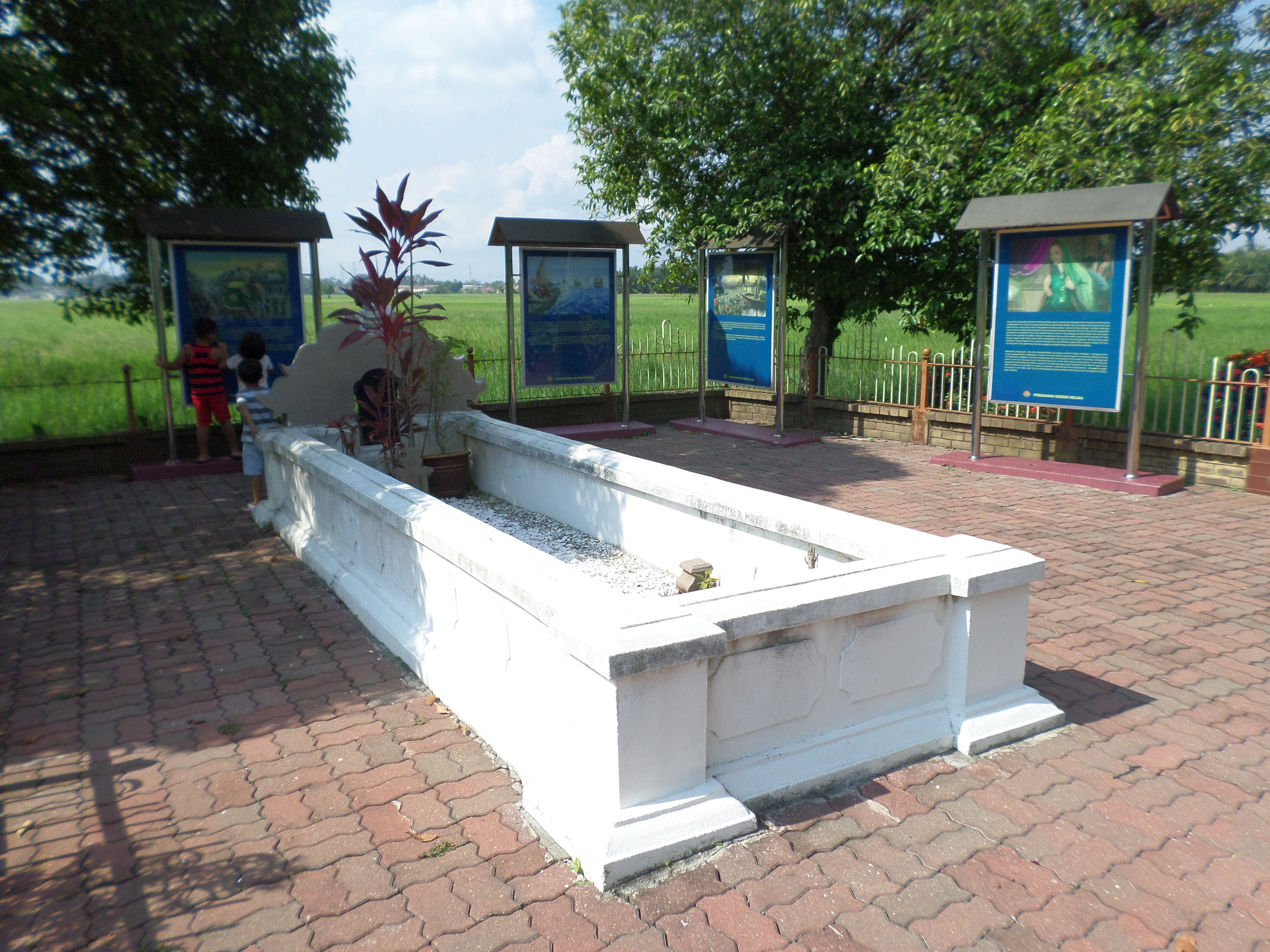
Tun Teja's Tomb
