= Jasin District =

District in Malacca, Malaysia

- District of Malacca
- Daerah Jasin
- Interactive map of Jasin District
- Location of Jasin District in Malaysia
- Coordinates: 2°18′N 102°25′E
- Country: Malaysia
- State: Malacca
- Seat: Jasin
- Local area government(s): Jasin Municipal Council (Jasin East); Hang Tuah Jaya Municipal Council (Jasin West)

Government
  - District officer: Anis Ali Hasan

Area
  - Total: 676.07 km^{2} (261.03 sq mi)

Population (2019)
  - Total: 156,600
  - Density: 231.6/km^{2} (599.9/sq mi)
- Time zone: UTC+8 (MST)
  - Summer (DST): UTC+8 (Not observed)
- Postcode: 77xxx
- Calling code: +6-06
- Vehicle registration plates: M

Jasin District, formerly known as Southern District, is one of the three administrative district in Malacca, Malaysia. It borders Tangkak District of Johor to the east, Tampin District of Negeri Sembilan to the north and Alor Gajah District and Melaka Tengah District to the west. The district capital is Jasin Town.

== History ==
The early establishment of Jasin started since the establishment of small settlement by the local people. They chose an area near river mainly for their water supply, communication and agricultural purpose. To sustain life, they planted paddy and grew vegetables and fruit.

== Geography ==
Jasin District is the largest district in Malacca occupying 41.47% of the state area. The Kesang River runs through the center of Jasin Town. The Kesang River separates the new town from the old town center. Almost 75% of the district area is flat plain, located not more than 50 meters above sea level.

== Administrative divisions ==

Jasin District is divided into 20 mukims:

Mukim	Area	Mukim	Area
1	Air Panas	11	Nyalas
2	Batang Melaka	12	Rim
3	Bukit Senggeh	13	Sebatu
4	Chabau	14	Selandar
5	Chinchin	15	Sempang
6	Chohong	16	Semujok
7	Jasin	17	Serkam
8	Jus	18	Sungai Rambai
9	Kesang	19	Tedong
10	Merlimau	20	Umbai

Two big towns:

- Jasin
- Merlimau

And nine small towns:

- Pekan Asahan
- Batang Melaka
- Bemban
- Chinchin
- Kesang Pajak
- Nyalas
- Selandar
- Simpang Bekoh
- Sungai Rambai

== Demographics ==
Historical population
Year	Pop.	±%
1991	92,771	—
2000	101,659	+9.6%
2010	131,539	+29.4%
2020	151,937	+15.5%

== Federal Parliament and State Assembly Seats ==
Jasin district is divided with two federal constituencies with northern part of Jasin in Alor Gajah constituency while the rest of district in Jasin constituency.

List of Jasin district representatives in the Federal Parliament (Dewan Rakyat)

Parliament	Seat Name	Member of Parliament	Party
P135	Alor Gajah	Adly Zahari	Pakatan Harapan (AMANAH)
P137	Hang Tuah Jaya	Adam Adli Abd Halim	Pakatan Harapan (KEADILAN)
P139	Jasin	Zulkifli Ismail	Perikatan Nasional (PAS)

List of Jasin district representatives in the State Legislative Assembly (Dewan Undangan Negeri)

Parliament	State	Seat Name	State Assemblyman	Party
P135	N10	Asahan	Fairul Nizam Roslan	Barisan Nasional (UMNO)
P137	N18	Ayer Molek	Rahmad Mariman	Barisan Nasional (UMNO)
P139	N24	Bemban	Mohd Yadzil Yaakub	Perikatan Nasional (BERSATU)
P139	N25	Rim	Khaidirah Abu Zahar	Barisan Nasional (UMNO)
P139	N26	Serkam	Zaidi Attan	Barisan Nasional (UMNO)
P139	N27	Merlimau	Muhamad Akmal Saleh	Barisan Nasional (UMNO)
P139	N28	Sungai Rambai	Siti Faizah Abdul Azis	Barisan Nasional (UMNO)

== Economy ==
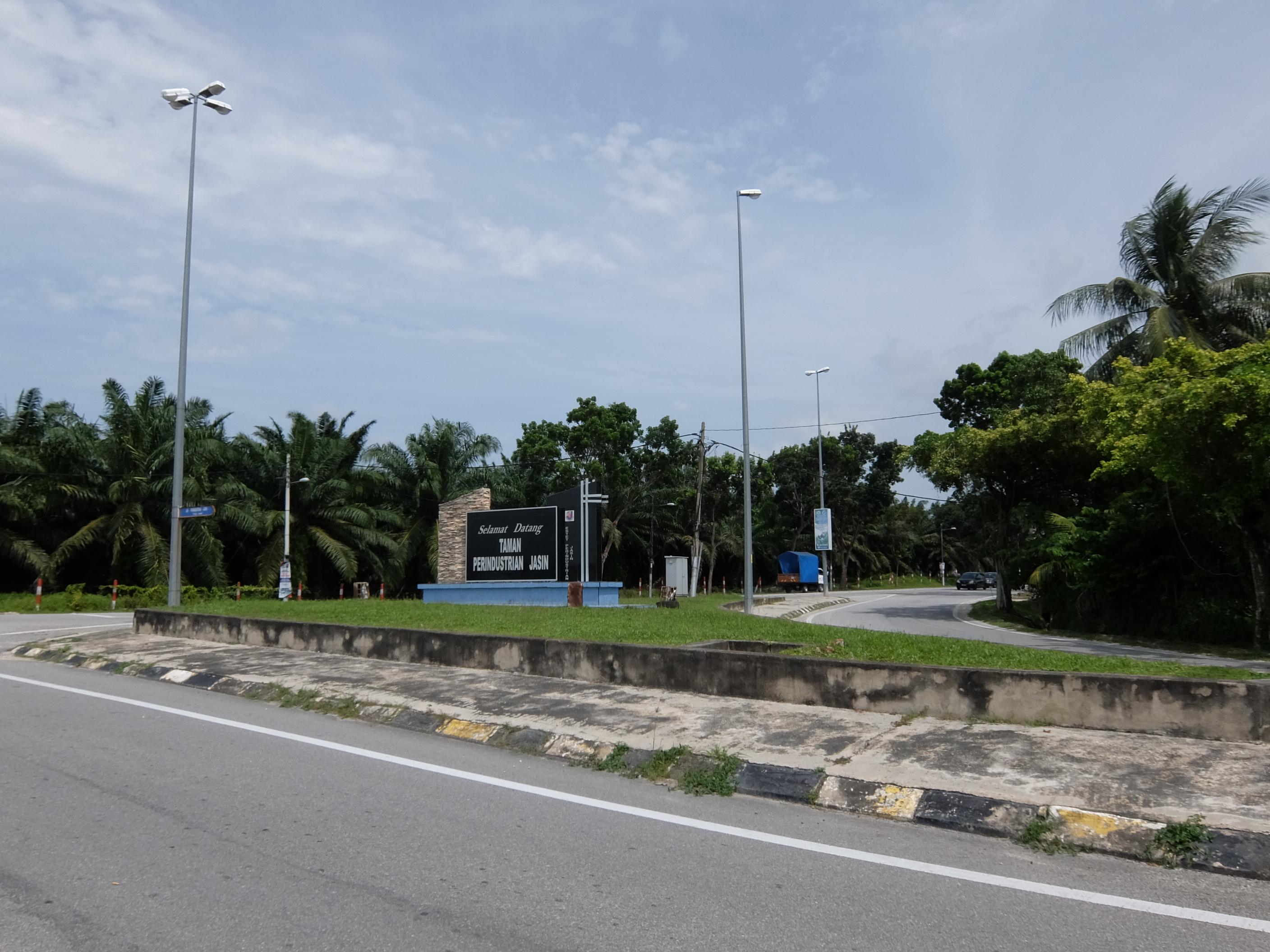
Jasin Industrial Park

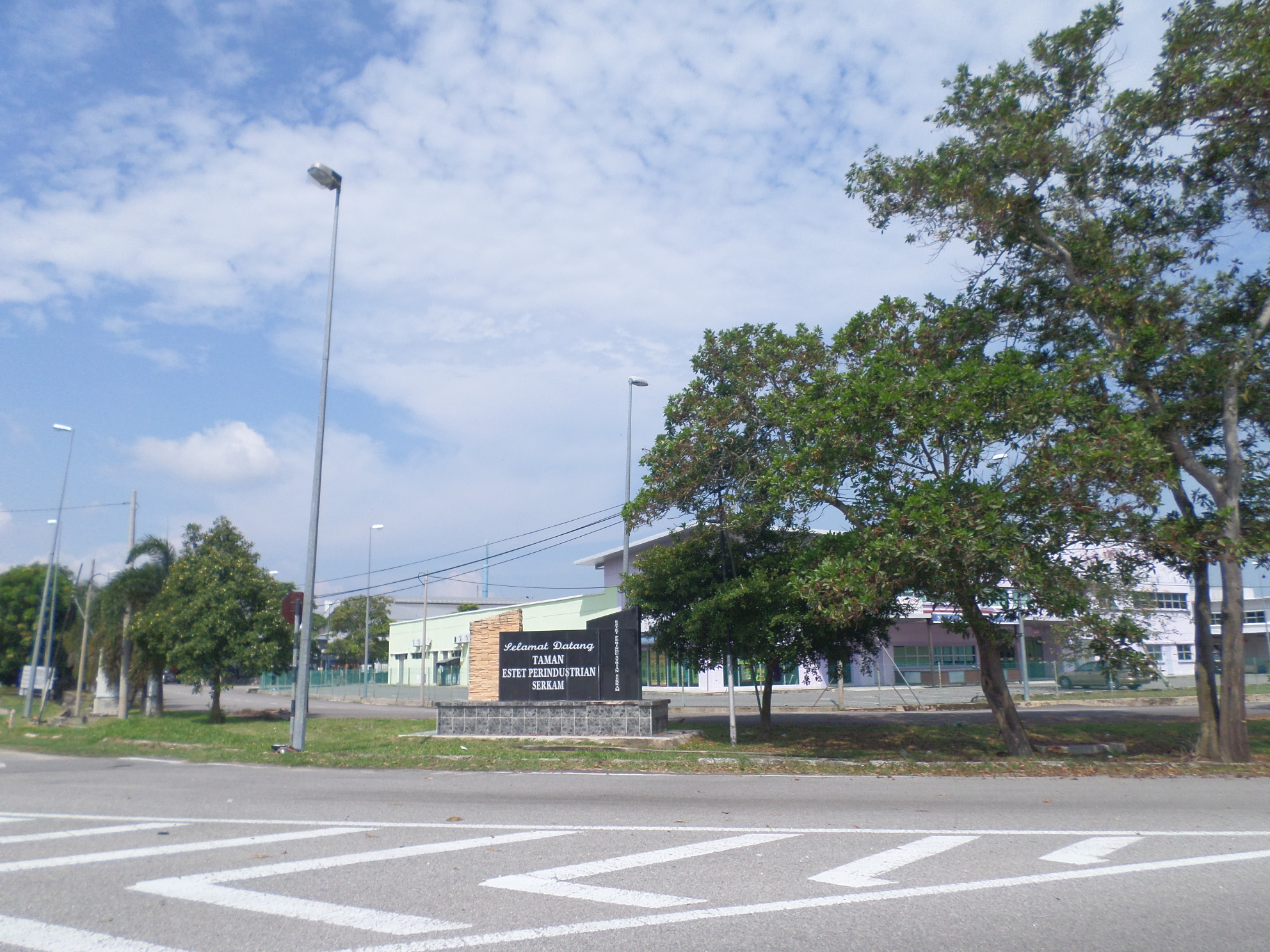
Serkam Industrial Area

Major businesses are mainly conducted by the Malays with a handful of Chinese, South Indians and Gujaratis. Jasin was known for its best Nasi Lemak especially in Kesang most peaceful place in Jasin District, it was made from generation to generation in Malay culture, also Kuih and Mee Bandung.

Because the district has been designated as a water catchment area, industrialization is restricted to around the towns of Jasin and Merlimau. A large proportion of the land is used for the growing of rubber trees, oil palm and fruits. The area is also known for its durian fruits.

The old town center of Jasin Town consists of mainly 1920s 2-storey shophouses where small businesses is conducted on the ground floor and the owner lives above. Modern commercial buildings adorn the new town area and only one bridge over the Kesang River connects the new town to the old town.

=== Industrial areas ===
- Elkay Industrial Park
- Jasin Industrial Park
- Serkam Industrial Area

== Infrastructure ==
=== Medicine ===
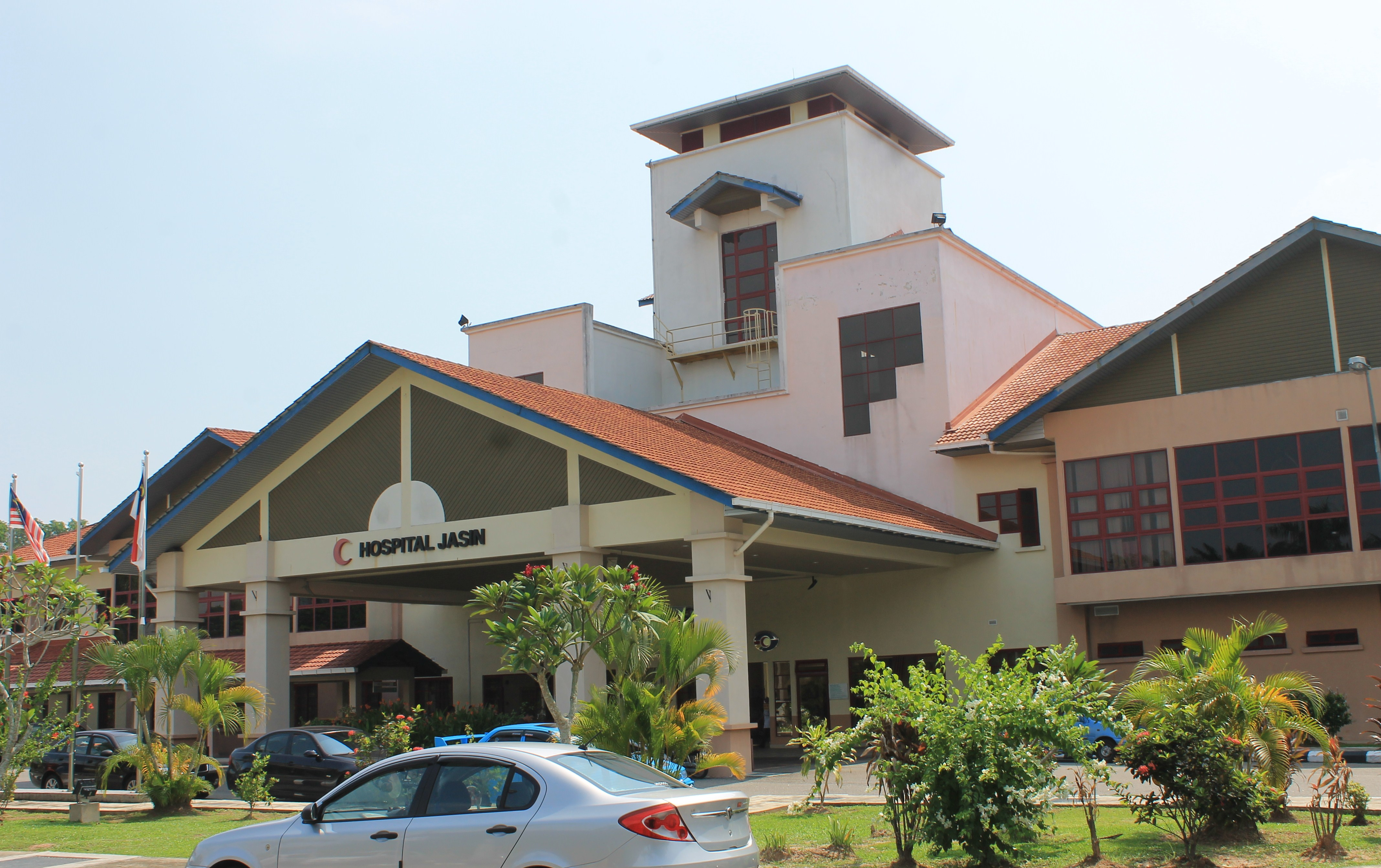
Jasin Hospital

Jasin boasts a new government hospital, Jasin Hospital, which replaced the old one that was fast becoming insufficient to meet the needs of the growing population. The hospital also serves as a teaching hospital for Malacca Manipal Medical College.

Besides the hospital, other government healthcare facilities include

- 7 community clinics
- 9 dental clinics
- 22 klinik desa (village clinics)

=== Education ===
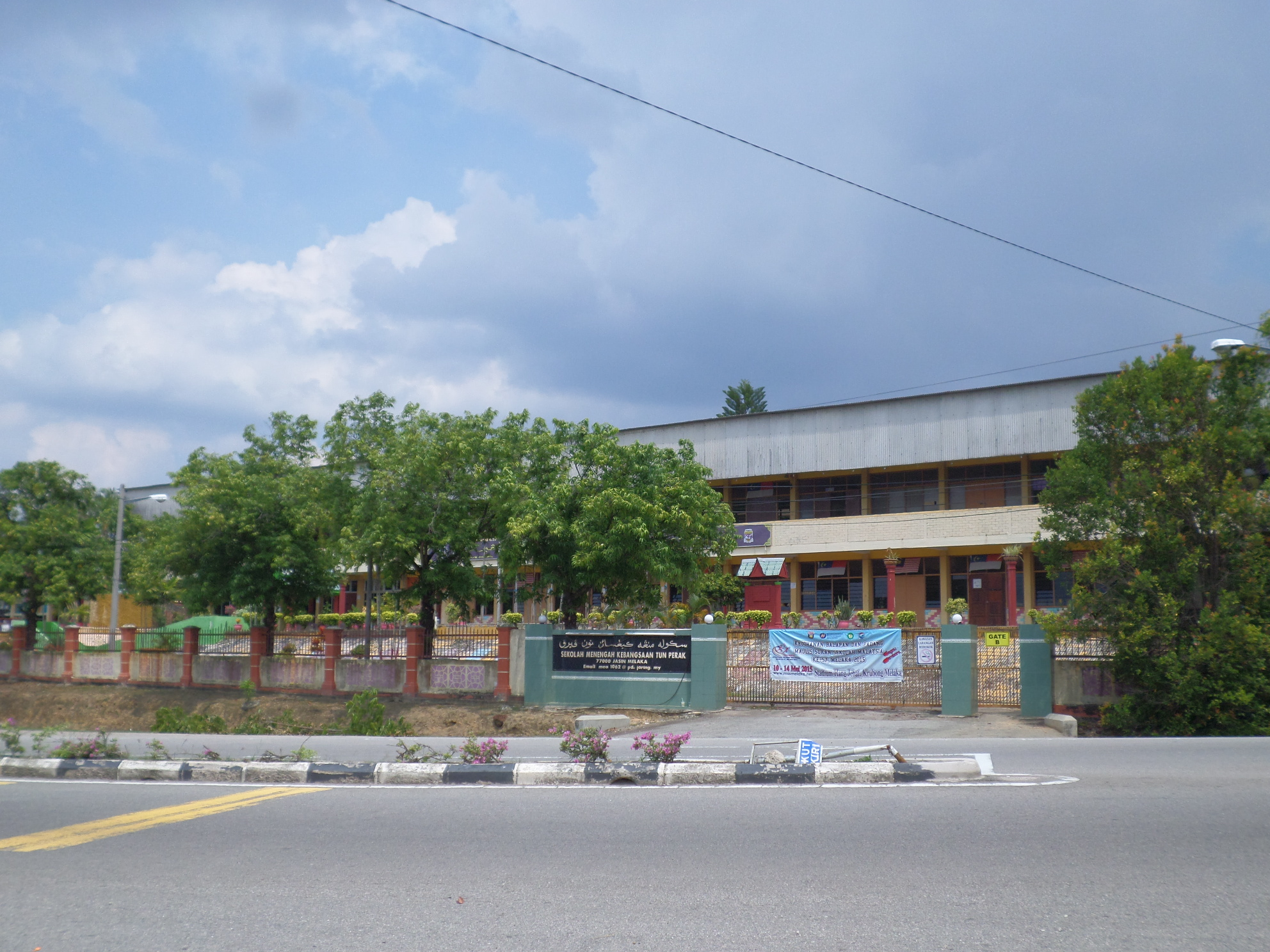
SMK Tun Perak

There are about 19 schools in Jasin district. Schools such as MRSM Tun Ghafar Baba, SMK Iskandar Shah and SMK Dang Anum are examples of schools that are well known in Malaysia. The Malaysia Institute of Aviation Technology, part of the Universiti Kuala Lumpur, is also located in Jasin. Other schools are listed below:

Extended content
- MRSM Tun Ghafar Baba (MARA Junior Science College of Tun Ghafar Baba)

Jalan Sempang Kerayong, 77000 Jasin, Malacca.

- Institut Kemahiran MARA (MARA Skills Institute)

Jalan Chinchin, Simpang Kerayong Peti Surat 141, 77000 Jasin, Malacca

- SBP Integrasi Selandar (Selandar Integrated Boarding School)

Jalan Batang Melaka, 77500 Selandar, Malacca.

- SMK Iskandar Shah (Iskandar Shah Secondary School)

Jalan Kelubi, 77000 Jasin, Malacca.

- SMK Dang Anum (Dang Anum Secondary School)

Jalan Jasin, 77300 Merlimau, Malacca.

- SMK Tun Perak (Tun Perak Secondary School)

Jalan Bunga Tanjung (Jalan Taman Maju), 77000 Jasin, Malacca.

- SMK Datuk Bendahara (Datuk Bendahara Secondary School)

Jalan Pegawai, 77000 Jasin, Malacca.

- SMK Seri Bemban (Seri Bemban Secondary School)

Jalan Ayer Panas, 77200 Bemban, Malacca.

- SMK Simpang Bekoh (Simpang Bekoh Secondary School)

Jalan Asahan, 77100 Jasin, Malacca.

- SMK Selandar (Selandar Secondary School)

Pejabat Pos Selandar, 77500 Selandar, Malacca.

- SMK Sungai Rambai (Sungai Rambai Secondary School)

Jalan Parit Putat, 77400 Sungai Rambai, Malacca.

- SMK Jasin (Jasin Secondary School)

Jalan Bunga Tanjung, 77000 Jasin, Malacca.

- SMK Sri Mahkota (Sri Mahkota Secondary School)

KM16, Umbai, 77300 Merlimau, Malacca.

- SMK DARY (SMK Datuk Abdul Rahman Ya'kob) (DARY Secondary School)

Jalan Jasin, 77300 Merlimau, Malacca.

- SMK Teknik Jasin (Jasin Technical Secondary School)

Jalan Kemendor, 77000 Jasin, Malacca.

- SMK Nyalas (Nyalas Secondary School)

Jalan Melangkan, Nyalas, 77100 Asahan, Malacca.

- Politeknik Merlimau (Merlimau Politechnic)

Karung Berkunci 1031, Pejabat Pos Merlimau, 77300 Merlimau, Malacca.

- Universiti Teknologi MARA (MARA Technology University)

77000 Jasin, Malacca.

- Kolej Komuniti Jasin (Jasin Community College)

77000 Jasin, Malacca.

- Kolej Komuniti Selandar (Selandar Community College)

Jalan Batang Melaka, 77500 Selandar, Malacca.

- Pusat Lagenda Program Latihan Khidmat Negara (PKLN) Asahan

KM 69, Jalan Kolam Air, Mukim Chabau, 77100 Asahan, Malacca.

== Tourist attractions ==
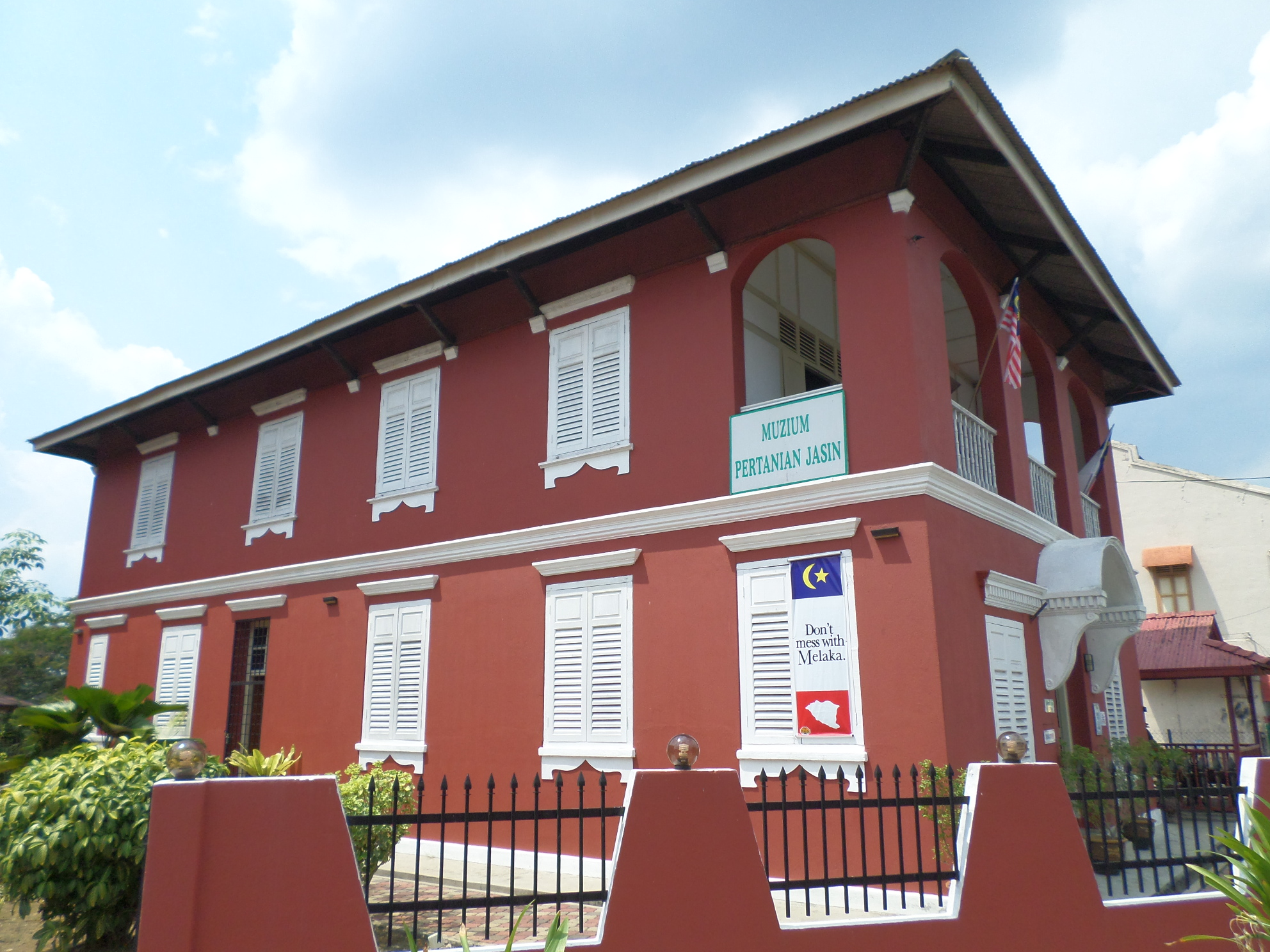
Agricultural Museum

- Acehnese Headstone
- Agricultural Museum
- Asahan Waterfall
- Bukit Langsat Recreational Forest
- Chinchin Lake Extreme Park
- Datuk Senara Mausoleum
- Demang Abdul Ghani Gallery
- Jasin Square
- Portuguese Well
- Selandar Agro Park
- Serkam Jamek Mosque
- Serompol Tehel Recreational Park
- Sultan Ali of Johor Mausoleum, Umbai Mukim
- Tun Teja Mausoleum
- Jus Reservoir

== Transportation ==
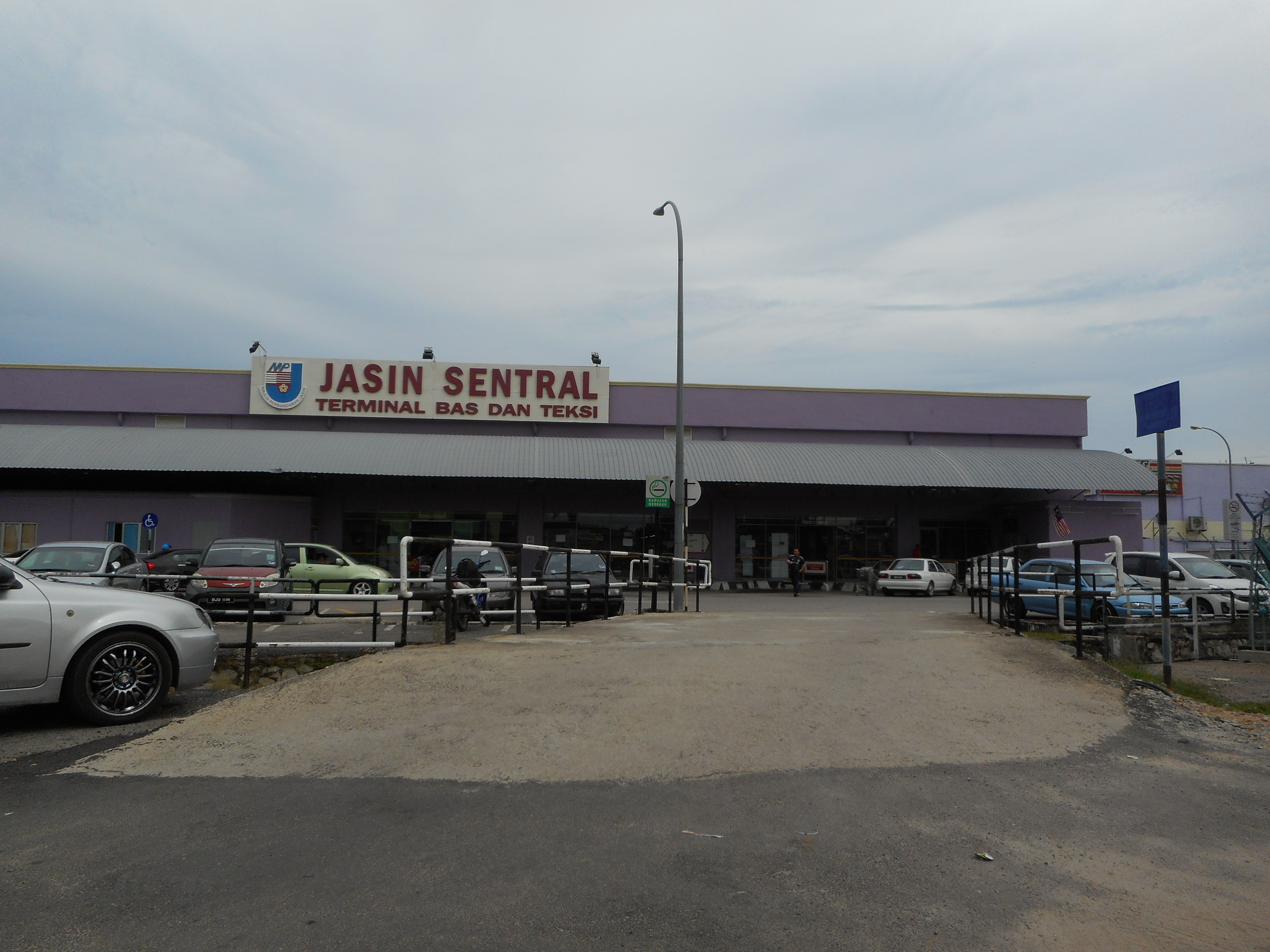
Jasin Sentral Bus and Taxi Terminal

Jasin town center is about half-an-hour drive away from Malacca City. From nearby Asahan it is possible to ascend the peak of Mount Ledang in Johor. Asahan is a border town boasting waterfalls. Jasin also borders Tangkak District, particularly the town of Tangkak in Johor. The two towns are about ten minutes' drive away from each other.

== See also ==
- Districts of Malaysia
