= Abdul Rahim Thamby Chik =

Malaysian politician

Yang Berbahagia Tan Sri Datuk Seri Abdul Rahim Thamby Chik PSM DGSM SSSA DPMJ DA AMN PJK
- عبدالرحيم ثمبي چئ

6th Chief Minister of Malacca
- In office 26 April 1982 – 13 October 1994
- Governor: Syed Zahiruddin Syed Hassan (1982–1984); Syed Ahmad Syed Mahmud Shahabuddin (1984–1994)
- Preceded by: Mohd Adib Mohamad Adam
- Succeeded by: Mohd Zin Abdul Ghani

Vice President of Parti Wawasan Negara
- Incumbent
- Assumed office 20 June 2026

10th Youth Chief of the United Malays National Organisation
- In office 1993–1994
- President: Mahathir Mohamad
- Preceded by: Najib Razak
- Succeeded by: Ahmad Zahid Hamidi

Federal Ministerial Roles
- 1978–1980: Parliamentary Secretary of Primary Industries
- 1980–1981: Parliamentary Secretary of Trade and Industry

Division Chief of the Malaysian United Indigenous Party of Alor Gajah
- In office 3 November 2024 – 2026
- Deputy: Rozaini Salim
- Preceded by: Zamzuri Ariffin

Faction represented in the Malacca State Legislative Assembly
- 1982–1999: Barisan Nasional

Faction represented in Dewan Rakyat
- 1978–1982: Barisan Nasional

State Chairman of the Malaysian United Indigenous Party of Malacca
- In office 18 January 2025 – 2026
- President: Muhyiddin Yassin
- Deputy: Azzaruddin Idris
- Preceded by: Mohd Yadzil Yaakub
- Succeeded by: Mohamad Ali Mohamad

Corporate Roles
- 2010–2015: Chairman of Rubber Industry Smallholders Development Authority (RISDA)

Personal details
- Born: Abdul Rahim bin Thamby Chik; 10 April 1949 (age 77) Kampung Pangkalan Balak, Masjid Tanah, Malacca, Federation of Malaya (now Malaysia)
- Citizenship: Malaysian
- Party: United Malays National Organisation (UMNO) (until 2018); Malaysian United Indigenous Party (BERSATU) (2018 – 24 February 2026); National Vision Party (WAWASAN) (since 2026)
- Other political affiliations: Barisan Nasional (BN) (until 2018); Pakatan Harapan (PH) (2018–2020); Perikatan Nasional (PN) (since 2020)
- Spouse: Zabedah Abdullah
- Relations: Zahir Kelvin Ong Abdullah (son-in-law)
- Children: Zetty Juyanty, Tutty Rahiza, Petty Diyana, Rahimy
- Parents: Thamby Chik Karim (father); Habsah Hassan (mother)
- Education: University of Malaya
- Occupation: Politician; Corporate member
- Website: rahimthambychik.blogspot.my

Abdul Rahim bin Thamby Chik (Jawi: عبدالرحيم ثمبي چئ, Malay pronunciation: [abdul rahim]; born 10 April 1949) is a Malaysian politician. He was the 6th Chief Minister of Malacca from 1982 to 1994. He is a former Youth Chief of the United Malays National Organisation (UMNO), a major component party of Barisan Nasional (BN) coalition. He was aligned with Mahathir Mohamad during the 1987 UMNO General Assembly. He was a member and the Division Chief of Alor Gajah of the Malaysian United Indigenous Party (BERSATU), a component party of the Perikatan Nasional (PN) coalition and State Chairman of BERSATU of Melaka from January 2025 to 2026. He is also formerly the Chairman of the Rubber Industry Smallholders Development Authority (RISDA) from 2010 to 2015. Presently, he is a member and Vice President of WAWASAN.

== Personal life ==
His father, Thamby Chik Abdul Karim, died before his 16th birthday.

== Background ==
Rahim is married to Puan Sri Zabedah Abdullah and the couple have 4 children; Zetty Juyanty, Tutty Rahiza, Petty Diyana and Rahimy. Their eldest daughter, Zetty married the former TV3 personality, Zahir Kelvin Ong Abdullah (né Kelvin Ong), an ethnic Chinese from Kuching, Sarawak and divorced in 2026.

== Education ==
Rahim received his primary school education at Sekolah Kebangsaan Pengkalan Balak, Masjid Tanah. Then he studied at Sekolah Menengah Kebangsaan Ghafar Baba, Malacca and Sekolah Menengah Datuk Seri Amar DiRaja, Muar, Johor. He continued his studies at University of Malaya (UM) and managed to graduate with bachelor's degree of Applied Economy (1969–1973).

== Controversies ==
In 1994 Rahim was initially charged with the statutory rape of an underaged girl; however, the public prosecutor later withdrew the charge citing lack of evidence. He resigned as chief minister of Malacca and youth chief of UMNO amid allegations he had sexual relations with the 15-year-old girl. In 1995, Democratic Action Party (DAP) leader, Lim Guan Eng, who in the past had accused Rahim of raping the minor and had criticised the then-government for not acting against Rahim; was charged and sentenced to 18 months’ jail by the Melaka High Court for maliciously printing false news instead under the Printing Presses and Publications Act 1984 and under the Sedition Act 1948, but Lim was eventually released after 12 months.

In 1999, Anwar Ibrahim in one of four police reports he made; Tun H.S. Lee report 22517/99 dated 20 August 1999 had accused that the then-Prime Minister Mahathir Mohamed, Attorney-General Mohtar Abdullah and Senior Deputy Public Prosecutor Abdul Gani Patail for abuse of power to cover-up the corruption case involving Rahim. A copy of the report was also sent to the Badan Pencegah Rasuah (BPR) then.

On 21 March 2011, Rahim was one of the 'Datuk T' trio; together with Datuk Shazryl Eskay Abdullah and Datuk Shuaib Lazim who screened a sex video at Bilik Seri Makmur, Hotel Carcosa Seri Negara; claiming it was of the opposition leader then Anwar Ibrahim allegedly engaging a prostitute to journalists which Anwar had denied the allegation. On 24 June 2011, they were charged and fined by Kuala Lumpur Magistrate Court for screening the sex video after they pleaded guilty.

Rahim was fined RM1,900 in default three months imprisonment by the Shah Alam Sessions Court on 20 September 2016, for making an offensive comment about Raja Muda of Selangor, Tengku Amir Shah on 25 September 2015. He also tendered a public apology to Selangor Ruler Sultan Sharafuddin Idris Shah and Tengku Amir, besides expressing remorse for his action. Rahim had earlier on 5 October 2015 claimed trial to an original charge of posting a seditious claim in his Facebook account that Tengku Amir was an apostate. However, the prosecution withdrew the charge after he pleaded guilty to the alternative charge.

== Election results ==
Parliament of Malaysia
Year	Constituency	Candidate	Votes	Pct	Opponent(s)	Votes	Pct	Ballots cast	Majority	Turnout
1978	P095 Alor Gajah	Abdul Rahim Thamby Chik (UMNO)	22,745	76.79%	Yaakop Abdul Hassan (PAS)	6,876	23.21%		15,869	

Malacca State Legislative Assembly
Year	Constituency	Candidate	Votes	Pct	Opponent(s)	Votes	Pct	Ballots cast	Majority	Turnout
1982	N04 Kelemak	Abdul Rahim Thamby Chik (UMNO)								
1986	N03 Masjid Tanah	Abdul Rahim Thamby Chik (UMNO)	5,199	83.24%	Kassim Yunus (PAS)	1,047	16.76%	6,562	4,152	70.32%
1990	N03 Masjid Tanah	Abdul Rahim Thamby Chik (UMNO)	6,262	86.66%	Kassim Yunus (PAS)	964	13.34%	7,462	5,298	78.78%

== Honours ==
=== Honours of Malaysia ===
- Malaysia
  - Commander of the Order of Loyalty to the Crown of Malaysia (PSM) – Tan Sri (1990)
  - Member of the Order of the Defender of the Realm (AMN) (1980)
- Malacca
  - Grand Commander of the Exalted Order of Malacca (DGSM) – Datuk Seri (1984)
  - Recipient of the Meritorious Service Medal (PJK)
- Johor
  - Commander of the Order of the Crown of Johor (DPMJ) – Dato' (1982)
- Sarawak
  - Grand Commander of the Order of the Star of Hornbill Sarawak (DA) – Datuk Amar (1986)
- Selangor
  - Grand Companion of the Order of Sultan Salahuddin Abdul Aziz Shah (SSSA) – Dato' Seri (1988)

Political offices
Preceded by Mohd Adib Mohamad Adam	Chief Minister of Melaka; 1982 - 1994	Succeeded by Mohd Zin Abdul Ghani
