= Melaka Planetarium =

Planetarium in Ayer Keroh, Malacca, Malaysia

Coordinates: 2°16′17.2″N 102°17′13.2″E

Melaka Planetarium Adventure Space Centre
- Planetarium Melaka
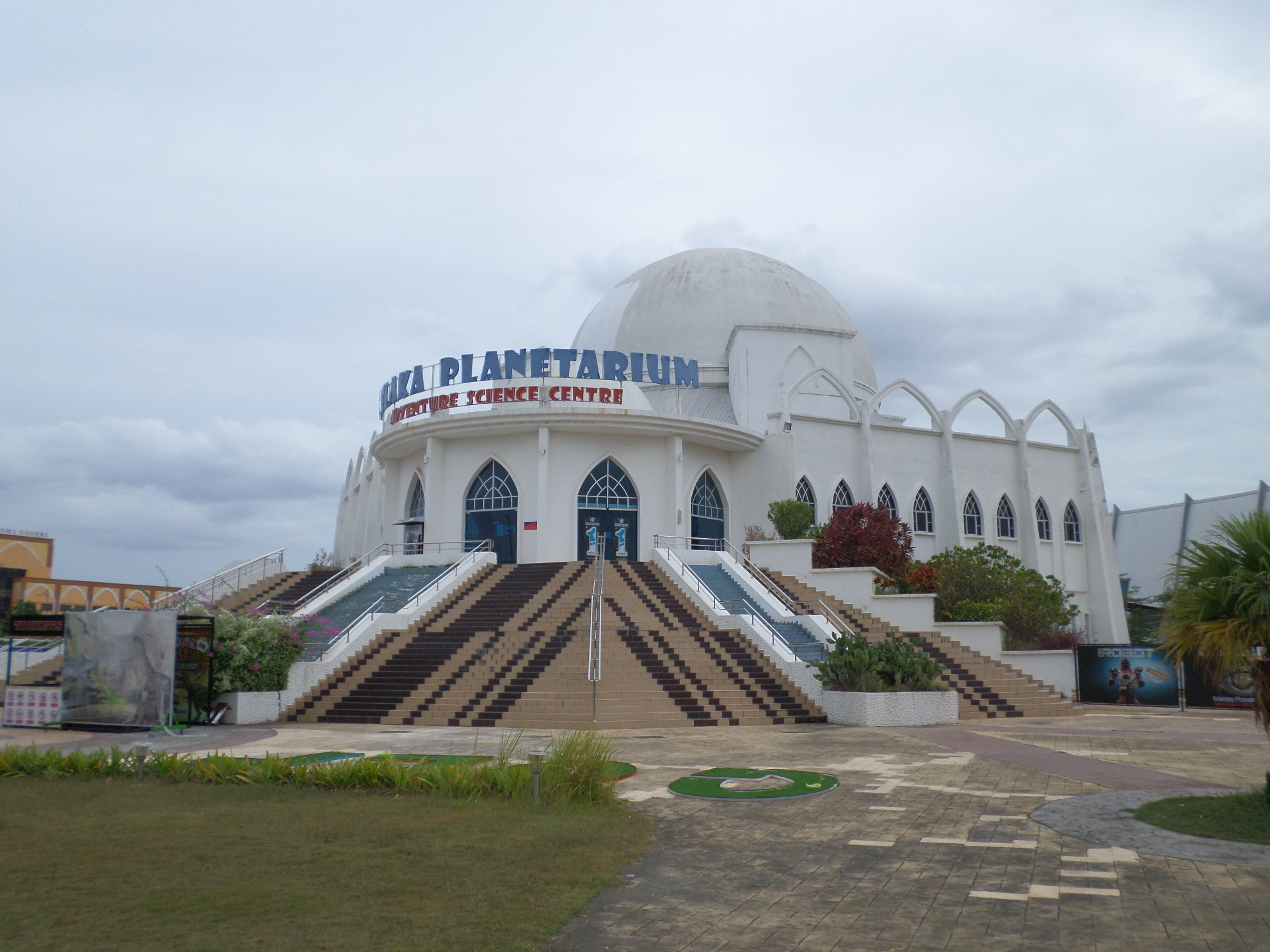
- Interactive map of the Melaka Planetarium Adventure Space Centre area

General information
- Type: planetarium
- Location: Ayer Keroh, Malacca, Malaysia
- Inaugurated: 10 August 2009
- Closed: 23 January 2019
- Cost: MYR20 million
- Owner: Planetarium Melaka Sdn. Bhd. (subsidiary of Malacca Chief Minister Incorporated)
- Operator: Planetarium Melaka Sdn. Bhd. (subsidiary of Malacca Chief Minister Incorporated)

Technical details
- Floor count: 3
- Floor area: 0.7 hectares

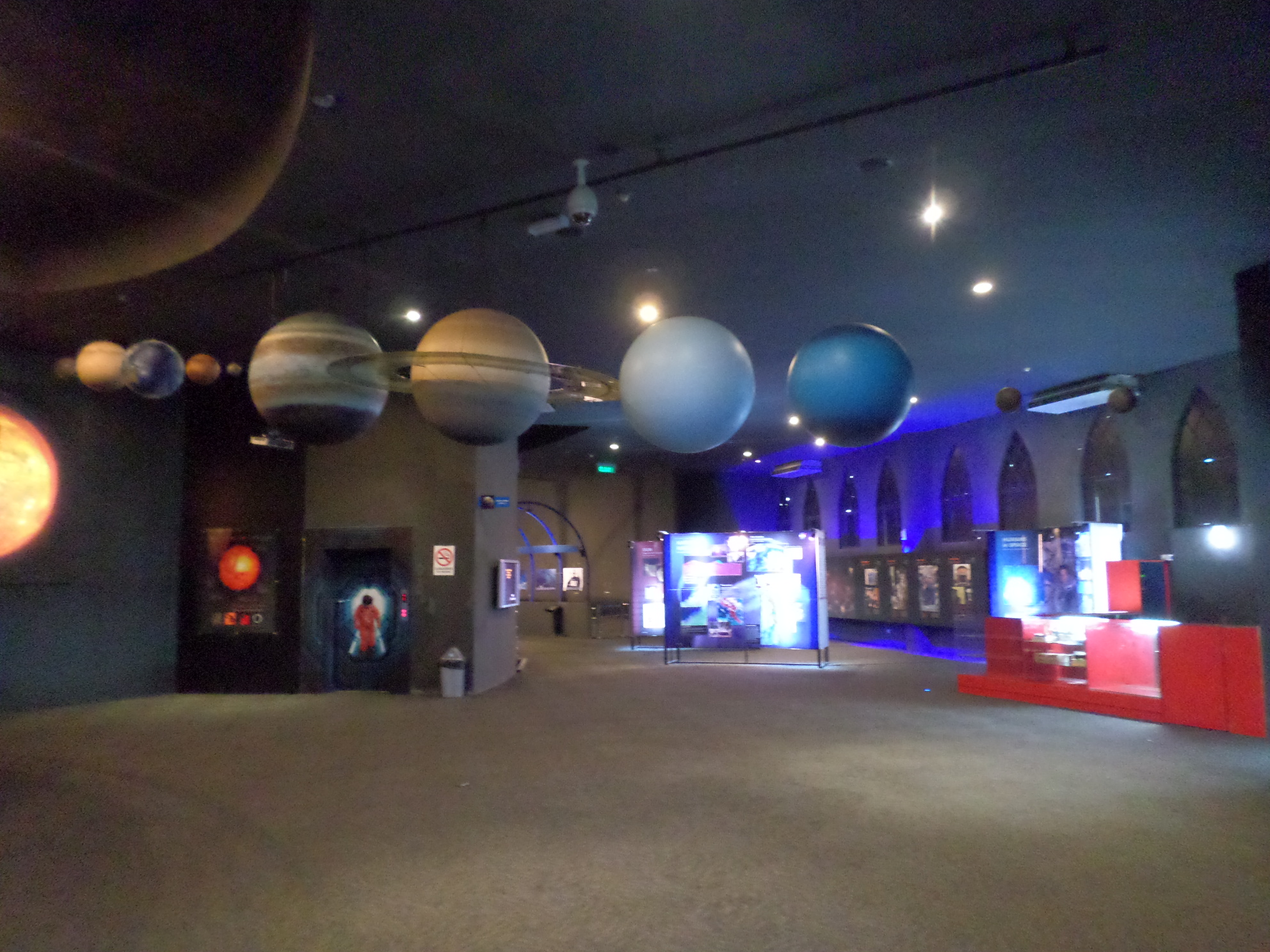
Melaka Planetarium exhibition hall

Melaka Planetarium (Malay: Planetarium Melaka), (Note: Planetarium uses the Malay language spelling of the state's name, as opposed to the more traditional English language spelling of its name, "Malacca".) officially known as Melaka Planetarium Adventure Science Centre, was a planetarium located at Melaka International Trade Centre business district in the town of Ayer Keroh, at the Malaysian state of Malacca. Its opening was officiated by Malacca State Chief Minister Mohd Ali Rustam on 10 August 2009, and is the second planetarium in the state after the Al-Khawarizmi Astronomy Complex in Masjid Tanah. The planetarium features Islamic architecture and a landing UFO, costing MYR20 million to be built. It covers an area of 0.7 hectares, with 3 floors. The planetarium is divided into four sections—which are astronomy, outer space, simulation, and physics, and exhibits the magnificent cosmos, history of astronomy and astronomers and also various other attractions.

== Closing ==
Two incident occur in 2018. In May, a temporary extension of the structure got in fire while in November, a wall part of the structure collapsed. It have been declared unsafe on 2019 and sealed. Muhammad Jailani Khamis, Malacca state exco announced that the state government will repair the structure along with Galaxy World development. However, this was never materialised.

== See also ==
- List of tourist attractions in Malacca
