= Alor Gajah (federal constituency) =

Federal constituency of Malacca, Malaysia

Alor Gajah (P135)
Malacca constituency

Federal constituency
- Legislature: Dewan Rakyat
- MP: Adly Zahari; PH
- Constituency created: 1974
- First contested: 1974
- Last contested: 2022

Demographics
- Population (2020): 171,073
- Electors (2026): 97,336
- Area (km²): 560
- Pop. density (per km²): 305.5

Alor Gajah is a federal constituency in Alor Gajah District and Jasin District, Malacca, Malaysia, that has been represented in the Dewan Rakyat since 1974.

The federal constituency was created in the 1974 redistribution and is mandated to return a single member to the Dewan Rakyat under the first past the post voting system.

== Demographics ==
Ethnic breakdown of Alor Gajah's electorate as of 2022
1. Malay (62.7%)
2. Chinese (23.8%)
3. Indian (12.9%)
4. Other ethnicities (0.70%)

As of 2020, Alor Gajah has a population of 171,073 people.

Age breakdown of Alor Gajah's electorate as of 2022
1. 18-20 (6.34%)
2. 21-29 (21.0%)
3. 30-39 (21.6%)
4. 40-49 (16.9%)
5. 50-59 (14.4%)
6. 60-69 (11.3%)
7. 70-79 (5.86%)
8. 80-89 (2.17%)
9. above 90 (0.39%)
Gender breakdown of Alor Gajah's electorate as of 2022
1. Male (49.2%)
2. Female (50.8%)

== History ==
=== Polling districts ===
According to the gazette issued on 5 November 2026, the Alor Gajah constituency has a total of 41 polling districts.

State constituency	Polling districts	Code	Location
Rembia (N06)	Pekan Alor Gajah	135/06/01	SK Alor Gajah 1; SJK (T) Alor Gajah
Rembia (N06)	Kelemak	135/06/02	SK Dato' Naning
Rembia (N06)	Jelatang	135/06/03	Kolej Vokesional Datuk Seri Mohd Zin
Rembia (N06)	Kampung Tebat	135/06/04	SMK Dato' Dol Said
Rembia (N06)	Sungai Petai	135/06/05	SK Sungai Petai
Rembia (N06)	Pekan Rembia	135/06/06	SJK (C) Kiow Min
Rembia (N06)	Jeram	135/06/07	SK Rembia
Gadek (N07)	Bukit Sebang	135/07/01	SMJK Pulau Sebang
Gadek (N07)	Pekan Pulau Sebang	135/07/02	SMK Sultan Mansor Shah
Gadek (N07)	Kuala Ina	135/07/03	SJK (T) Pulau Sebang
Gadek (N07)	Arongan	135/07/04	SK Pulau Sebang
Gadek (N07)	Tanjung Rimau	135/07/05	SRA (JAIM) Padang Sebang
Gadek (N07)	Padang Sebang	135/07/06	SK Padang Sebang
Gadek (N07)	Paya Datuk	135/07/07	SRA (JAIM) Paya Datok
Gadek (N07)	Pegoh	135/07/08	SK Pegoh
Gadek (N07)	Ganun	135/07/09	SK Ganun
Gadek (N07)	Pekan Gadek	135/07/10	SJK (C) Peng Min
Machap Jaya (N08)	Tebong	135/08/01	SJK (T) Pekan Tebong
Machap Jaya (N08)	FELDA Hutan Percha	135/08/02	SK Hutan Percha
Machap Jaya (N08)	Kemuning	135/08/03	SK Kemuning
Machap Jaya (N08)	Solok Mengong	135/08/04	SK Menggong
Machap Jaya (N08)	Machap Baru	135/08/05	SJK (C) Machap Baru
Machap Jaya (N08)	Ayer Pasir	135/08/06	SRA (JAIM) Kampung Ayer Pasir Machap
Machap Jaya (N08)	Machap Umbor	135/08/07	SJK (C) Machap Umboo
Machap Jaya (N08)	Melaka Pindah	135/08/08	SK Lesong Batu; SK Melaka Pindah
Durian Tunggal (N09)	Parit Melana	135/09/01	SK Parit Melana
Durian Tunggal (N09)	Belimbing Dalam	135/09/02	SK Belimbing Dalam
Durian Tunggal (N09)	Bukit Tambun	135/09/03	SK Durian Tungal; SRA (JAIM) Durian Tunggal
Durian Tunggal (N09)	Pekan Durian Tungal	135/09/04	SMK Durian Tungal
Durian Tunggal (N09)	Gangsa	135/09/05	SK Gangsa; SJK (C) Chabau
Asahan (N10)	Simpang Tebong	135/10/01	SJK (C) On Lok
Asahan (N10)	Pekan Selandar	135/10/02	SJK (C) Chiao Chee
Asahan (N10)	Bukit Sedanan	135/10/03	SK Seri Machap
Asahan (N10)	Batang Melaka	135/10/04	SK Batang Melaka
Asahan (N10)	Jus	135/10/05	SK Jus
Asahan (N10)	Bukit Senggeh	135/10/06	SK Bukit Senggeh
Asahan (N10)	Pekan Nyalas	135/10/07	SK Nyalas
Asahan (N10)	FELDA Bukit Senggeh	135/10/08	SK (FELDA) Bukit Senggeh
Asahan (N10)	Pondok Batang	135/10/09	SK Masjid Baru
Asahan (N10)	Ladang Bukit Asahan	135/10/10	SJK (T) Ladang Bukit Asahan
Asahan (N10)	Pekan Asahan	135/10/11	SK Asahan

=== Representation history ===
Members of Parliament for Alor Gajah
Parliament	No	Years	Member	Party	Vote Share
Constituency created from Malacca Utara and Malacca Selatan
4th	P095	1974–1978	Abdul Ghafar Baba (عبدالغفار بابا)	BN (UMNO)	20,890; 78.89%
5th	P095	1978–1982	Abdul Rahim Thamby Chik (عبدالرحيم ثمبي چئ)	BN (UMNO)	22,745; 76.79%
6th	P095	1982–1986	Mohd Adib Mohamad Adam (محمد أديب محمد آدم)	BN (UMNO)	25,342; 72.50%
7th	P110	1986–1990	Mohd Adib Mohamad Adam (محمد أديب محمد آدم)	BN (UMNO)	19,770; 83.46%
8th	P110	1990–1995	Ibrahim Jendol (إبراهيم جندول)	BN (UMNO)	23,201; 85.24%
9th	P120	1995–1999	Abu Seman Yusop (أبو ثمن يوسوڤ)	BN (UMNO)	29,652; 86.68%
10th	P120	1999–2004	Abu Seman Yusop (أبو ثمن يوسوڤ)	BN (UMNO)	24,615; 66.71%
11th	P135	2004–2008¹	Fong Chan Onn (冯镇安)	BN (MCA)	29,920; 80.23%
12th	P135	2008–2013	Fong Chan Onn (冯镇安)	BN (MCA)	26,354; 66.18%
13th	P135	2013–2018	Koh Nai Kwong (古乃光)	BN (MCA)	32,594; 60.82%
14th	P135	2018–2020	Mohd Redzuan Md Yusof (محمد رضوان مد يوسف)	PH (BERSATU)	29,330; 50.73%
14th	P135	2020–2022	Mohd Redzuan Md Yusof (محمد رضوان مد يوسف)	PN (BERSATU)	29,330; 50.73%
15th	P135	2022–present	Adly Zahari (عدلي ظهري)	PH (AMANAH)	28,178; 38.60%

Note: ^{1}Noted that in 2004 redelineation exercise this Alor Gajah constituency is now shifted east to Alor Gajah city centre from former Selandar constituency, not Masjid Tanah which now renamed as Masjid Tanah.

=== State constituency ===
Parliamentary constituency	State constituency						
Parliamentary constituency	1955–59*	1959–1974	1974–1986	1986–1995	1995–2004	2004–2018	2018–present
Alor Gajah						Asahan	
Alor Gajah						Durian Tunggal	
Alor Gajah						Gadek	
Alor Gajah			Kelemak				
Alor Gajah				Kuala Linggi			
Alor Gajah			Machap			Machap	
Alor Gajah							Machap Jaya
Alor Gajah			Masjid Tanah				
Alor Gajah					Melekek		
Alor Gajah					Ramuan China		
Alor Gajah						Rembia	
Alor Gajah				Sungai Bahru			
Alor Gajah					Sungai Udang		
Alor Gajah			Sungei Bahru				
Alor Gajah			Taboh Naning				

=== Historical boundaries ===
State Constituency	Area				
State Constituency	1974	1984	1994	2003	2018
Asahan				Asahan; Batang Melaka; Kampung Jus; Nyalas; Selandar	
Durian Tunggal				Belimbing; Durian Tunggal; Kampung Bukit Tambun; Parit Melana; Taman Angkasa Nuri	
Gadek				Bandar Satelit Sebang; Gadek; Kampung Arongan; Padang Sebang; Pulau Sebang	
Kelemak	Alor Gajah; Ayer Pa'abas; Genting Cheng Estate; Melaka Pindah; Pengkalan	Alor Gajah; Ayer Pa'abas; Kampung Cherana Putih; Simpang Ampat; Taboh Naning			
Kuala Linggi		Kampung Ayer Molek; Kuala Linggi; Kuala Sungai Baru; Paya Mengkuang; Tanjung Bidara	Kampung Ayer Molek; Kampung Man Lok; Kuala Linggi; Kuala Sungai Baru; Paya Mengkuang		
Machap	Gadek; Hutan Percha; Kemuning; Machap; Padang Sebang			Hutan Percha; Kemuning; Menggong; Melaka Pindah; Tebong	
Machap Jaya					Hutan Percha; Kemuning; Menggong; Melaka Pindah; Tebong
Masjid Tanah	Kampung Lekok; Masjid Tanah; Pengkalan Balak; Sungai Baru; Tanjung Bidara	Kampung Lekok; Lendu; Masjid Tanah; Sungai Baru; Taman Makmur	Lendu; Masjid Tanah; Pengkalan Balak; Sungai Baru; Tanjung Bidara		
Melekek			Ayer Pa'abas; Brisu; Kampung Bukit Payung; Simpang Ampat; Taboh Naning		
Ramuan China			Kampung Lekok; Ladang Sungai Baru; Lubok China; Paya Lebar; Ramuan China		
Rembia				Alor Gajah; Kampung Gajah Mati; Kasa Heights; Kelemak; Rembia	
Sungai Bahru	Kampung Man Lok; Ladang Sungai Baru; Paya Lebar; Ramuan China; Solok Limau Nipis	Brisu; Kampung Man Lok; Ladang Sungai Baru; Paya Lebar; Ramuan China			
Sungai Udang			Ayer Salak; Bertam; Kampung Ayer Supai; Kampung Paya Rumput; Sungai Udang		
Taboh Naning	Brisu; Kampung Bukit Payung; Pulau Sebang; Simpang Ampat; Taboh Naning				

=== Current state assembly members ===
No.	State Constituency	Member	Coalition (Party)
N06	Rembia	Ahmad Norazril Abd Aziz	BN (UMNO)
N07	Gadek	Nadarajah Sellappa	BN (MIC)
N08	Machap Jaya	Ngwe Hee Sem	BN (MCA)
N09	Durian Tunggal	Mustafa Musa	BN (UMNO)
N10	Asahan	Fairul Nizam Roslan	BN (UMNO)

=== Local governments & postcodes ===
No.	State Constituency	Local Government	Postcode
N06	Rembia	Alor Gajah Municipal Council	75350 Melaka; 76100 Durian Tunggal; 77100 Asahan; 77500 Selandar; 78000 Alor Gajah
N07	Gadek	Alor Gajah Municipal Council	75350 Melaka; 76100 Durian Tunggal; 77100 Asahan; 77500 Selandar; 78000 Alor Gajah
N08	Machap Jaya	Alor Gajah Municipal Council	75350 Melaka; 76100 Durian Tunggal; 77100 Asahan; 77500 Selandar; 78000 Alor Gajah
N09	Durian Tunggal	Alor Gajah Municipal Council; Hang Tuah Jaya Municipal Council (Durian Tunggal and UTEM areas)	75350 Melaka; 76100 Durian Tunggal; 77100 Asahan; 77500 Selandar; 78000 Alor Gajah
N10	Asahan	Jasin Municipal Council	75350 Melaka; 76100 Durian Tunggal; 77100 Asahan; 77500 Selandar; 78000 Alor Gajah

== Election results ==
Malaysian general election, 2022
Party	Candidate	Votes	%	∆%
PH	Adly Zahari	28,178	38.60	▲38.60
BN	Shahril Sufian Hamdan	27,288	37.38	▼1.28
PN	Mohd Redzuan Md Yusof	17,211	23.58	▲23.58
PEJUANG	Muhammad Nazriq Abdul Rahman	323	0.44	▲0.44
Total valid votes		73,000	100.00	
Total rejected ballots		726		
Unreturned ballots		174		
Turnout		73,900	79.20	▼4.65
Registered electors		93,311		
Majority		890	1.22	▼10.85
PH hold		Swing		
Source(s) https://lom.agc.gov.my/ilims/upload/portal/akta/outputp/1753258/PUB%20616%20PARLIMEN%20MELAKA.pdf

Malaysian general election, 2018
Party	Candidate	Votes	%	∆%
PKR	Mohd Redzuan Md Yusof	29,330	50.73	▲50.73
BN	Wong Nai Chee	22,350	38.66	▼22.16
PAS	Mohammad Nazree Mohammad Aris	6,135	10.61	▲10.61
Total valid votes		57,815	100.00	
Total rejected ballots		1,007		
Unreturned ballots		178		
Turnout		59,000	83.85	▼2.85
Registered electors		70,364		
Majority		6,980	12.07	▼9.57
PKR gain from BN		Swing		?
Source(s) "His Majesty's Government Gazette - Notice of Contested Election, Parliament for the State of Malacca [P.U. (B) 243/2018]" (PDF). Attorney General's Chambers of Malaysia. 3 May 2018. "Federal Government Gazette - Results of Contested Election and Statements of the Poll after the Official Addition of Votes, Parliamentary Constituencies for the State of Malacca [P.U. (B) 317/2018]" (PDF). Attorney General's Chambers of Malaysia. 28 May 2018. Archived from the original (PDF) on 29 December 2019.

Malaysian general election, 2013
Party	Candidate	Votes	%	∆%
BN	Koh Nai Kwong	32,594	60.82	▼5.36
DAP	Damian Yeo Shen Li	20,997	39.18	▲5.36
Total valid votes		53,591	100.00	
Total rejected ballots		1,437		
Unreturned ballots		103		
Turnout		55,131	86.70	▲9.33
Registered electors		63,591		
Majority		11,597	21.64	▼10.72
BN hold		Swing		
Source(s) "Federal Government Gazette - Notice of Contested Election, Parliament for the State of Malacca [P.U. (B) 180/2013]" (PDF). Attorney General's Chambers of Malaysia. 26 April 2013. "Federal Government Gazette - Results of Contested Election and Statements of the Poll after the Official Addition of Votes, Parliamentary Constituencies for the State of Malacca [P.U. (B) 221/2013]" (PDF). Attorney General's Chambers of Malaysia. 22 May 2013.

Malaysian general election, 2008
Party	Candidate	Votes	%	∆%
BN	Fong Chan Onn	26,354	66.18	▼14.05
DAP	Tan Lay Siang	13,470	33.82	▲14.05
Total valid votes		39,824	100.00	
Total rejected ballots		1,953		
Unreturned ballots		77		
Turnout		41,854	77.37	▲1.11
Registered electors		54,097		
Majority		12,884	32.36	▼28.10
BN hold		Swing		

Malaysian general election, 2004
Party	Candidate	Votes	%	∆%
BN	Fong Chan Onn	29,920	80.23	▲13.52
DAP	Goh Leong San	7,372	19.77	▲19.77
Total valid votes		37,292	100.00	
Total rejected ballots		1,941		
Unreturned ballots		110		
Turnout		39,343	76.26	▼5.32
Registered electors		51,588		
Majority		22,548	60.46	▲27.04
BN hold		Swing		

Malaysian general election, 1999
Party	Candidate	Votes	%	∆%
BN	Abu Seman Yusop	24,615	66.71	▼19.97
PAS	Ab. Ghani Ab. Rahman	12,283	33.29	▲19.97
Total valid votes		36,898	100.00	
Total rejected ballots		961		
Unreturned ballots		3,996		
Turnout		41,855	81.58	▲1.88
Registered electors		51,303		
Majority		12,332	33.42	▼39.94
BN hold		Swing		

Malaysian general election, 1995
Party	Candidate	Votes	%	∆%
BN	Abu Seman Yusop	29,652	86.68	▲1.44
PAS	Omar Baba	4,556	13.32	▼1.44
Total valid votes		34,208	100.00	
Total rejected ballots		1,503		
Unreturned ballots		1,239		
Turnout		36,950	79.70	▲2.45
Registered electors		46,363		
Majority		25,096	73.36	▲2.90
BN hold		Swing		

Malaysian general election, 1990
Party	Candidate	Votes	%	∆%
BN	Ibrahim Jendol	23,201	85.24	▲1.78
PAS	Moktar Ibrahim	4,019	14.76	▼1.78
Total valid votes		27,220	100.00	
Total rejected ballots		771		
Unreturned ballots		0		
Turnout		27,991	77.25	▲7.34
Registered electors		36,234		
Majority		19,182	70.48	▲3.56
BN hold		Swing		

Malaysian general election, 1986
Party	Candidate	Votes	%	∆%
BN	Mohd Adib Mohamad Adam	19,770	83.46	▲10.96
PAS	Ab Rahman Hasan	3,918	16.54	▲4.12
Total valid votes		23,688	100.00	
Total rejected ballots		758		
Unreturned ballots		0		
Turnout		24,446	69.91	▼4.56
Registered electors		34,966		
Majority		15,852	66.92	▲9.51
BN hold		Swing		

Malaysian general election, 1982
Party	Candidate	Votes	%	∆%
BN	Mohd Adib Mohamad Adam	25,342	72.50	▼4.29
DAP	Lim Swee	5,274	15.09	▲15.09
PAS	Abdul Rahman Hassan	4,340	12.42	▼10.79
Total valid votes		34,956	100.00	
Total rejected ballots		1,114		
Unreturned ballots		0		
Turnout		36,070	74.47	▼1.57
Registered electors		48,437		
Majority		20,068	57.41	▲3.83
BN hold		Swing		

Malaysian general election, 1978
Party	Candidate	Votes	%	∆%
BN	Abdul Rahim Thamby Chik	22,745	76.79	▼2.10
PAS	Yaakop Abdul Hassan	6,876	23.21	▲23.21
Total valid votes		29,621	100.00	
Total rejected ballots		2,061		
Unreturned ballots		0		
Turnout		31,682	76.04	▼1.72
Registered electors		41,663		
Majority		15,869	53.58	▼4.20
BN hold		Swing		

Malaysian general election, 1974
Party	Candidate	Votes	%
BN	Abdul Ghafar Baba	20,890	78.89
PEKEMAS	Abdul Ghani Long	5,591	21.11
Total valid votes		26,481	100.00
Total rejected ballots		1,269	
Unreturned ballots		0	
Turnout		27,750	77.76
Registered electors		35,663	
Majority		15,299	57.78
This was a new constituency created.
