= 1994 Malacca rape scandal =

1994 political scandal in Malaysia

The 1994 Malacca rape scandal was a political scandal in Malaysian politics in the mid-1990s. It involved an unnamed 15-year old Malay schoolgirl, who accused chief minister of Malacca, Abdul Rahim Thamby Chik and 13 other people of statutory rape. Eight of the accused confessed to their acts. In August 1994, the schoolgirl was detained by police under "protective custody" and was told not to lodge reports against Abdul Rahim. Two months later, under controversial circumstances, prosecution dropped the case, citing a lack of evidence, and ordered the detainment of the alleged victim in a rehabilitation centre. The scandal greatly damaged Abdul Rahim's career, and amidst public pressure, he resigned as chief minister in November 1994.

The scandal went further when Lim Guan Eng, the DAP MP for Kota Melaka, published statements on urging for the release of the detained schoolgirl and criticising government inaction against prosecuting Abdul Rahim. Due to his actions, he was arrested and charged with sedition in 1995. In 1997, he was found guilty and given a fine, but was imprisoned in 1998 for a year after his appeal against the ruling was dismissed, thereby losing his parliamentary seat. His trial and conviction ignited popular dissatisfaction towards the Mahathir administration and the Malaysian judiciary, and was among the factors which contributed to a rise of political tensions in Malaysia as was demonstrated in the Reformasi movement in the late-1990s.

== Background ==
Abdul Rahim Thamby Chik was chief minister of Malacca since 1982, and UMNO Youth Chief since 1993. He was known to be a staunch ally of prime minister Mahathir Mohamad since the 1980s. In 1994, an unnamed school girl from Alor Gajah, Malacca lodged 17 police reports on 14 men for having sexual relations with her when she was 15-years old. One of the alleged sexual relationships involved Abdul Rahim, an allegation that he has denied. In a press conference hosted by her family in November 1999, it was stated that he was the first of the 14 men to have sexual relationships with her. Eight of the 14 people accused confessed to their acts. Medical examinations on the alleged victim confirmed that she was around eight weeks pregnant, though the father's identity was not identified. The girl gave birth to a female baby in 1995.

== Events ==
=== Investigations ===
In August 1994, the schoolgirl was detained by police under "protective custody" and was told not to lodge reports against Abdul Rahim. Investigation of the case begun on 29 August 1994, of which the police collected statements from 42 people, including the alleged victim, her friends, and her school teacher. A forensic expert and two medical experts assisted the police in the investigation.

On 21 October 1994, the prosecutor, Attorney General Mohtar Abdullah dropped Rahim's case, citing a lack of prima facie evidence. Abdul Hamid Othman, a minister in the prime minister's department, proposed to persecute the girl under Islamic law for illicit sex and pregnancy outside marriage, a decision met with outrage from women's rights groups. The courts finally settled to place the girl under custody of a rehabilitation center for "wayward girls" for three years. None of the people who confessed to having sexual intercourse with the alleged victim were sentenced or sent to prison.

The prosecution's ruling was met with outrage and allegations of bias. Several women rights groups protested against the decision. In November 1994, Mahathir's daughter, Marina, published a newspaper article titled Whither justice?, describing the girls' treatment by the authorities as a "gross mockery of justice". The girl's father, who initially consented to sending her to the rehabilitation centre, withdrew his approval by stating that he able to take care of his daughter, but the court continued to remand her in the centre. Her family reported that she repeatedly tried to escape from a rehabilitation centre in Rembau without avail.

Pressured by public opinion, Rahim resigned as UMNO Youth Chief in September 1994, and as chief minister on 21 November 1994. His resignation from UMNO Youth was not accepted by Mahathir, and he was reinstated as UMNO Youth Chief despite significant opposition from within the organisation. He ultimately resigned his position in 1996.

=== Intervention from Lim Guan Eng ===
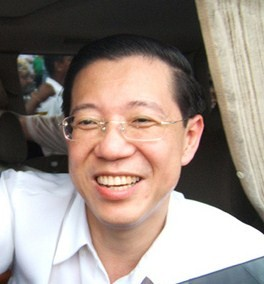
Lim Guan Eng, 2008.

The grandmother of the schoolgirl, Pendek Ahmad, was reportedly furious over the prosecution's ruling. After the detained girl was not granted contact from her family by authorities for eight days, in early-1995, the family sought for help from Lim Guan Eng, the DAP MP for Kota Melaka for her release. Lim published statements on behalf of the girl, criticising the government for not acting against Abdul Rahim, and Mohtar for applying "double standards" on the final ruling.

Due to his remarks, Lim was charged by the government on 28 February 1995 for prompting "disaffection with the administration of justice in Malaysia". On 13 March, he was again accused of spreading "false information maliciously", referring to the printing of five-thousand pamphlets, titled Victim imprisoned, criminal free, that denoted the phrase "imprisoned victim" to describe the girl, of which the authorities considered false. He was arrested and charged with sedition under the Sedition Act 1948 and Printing Presses and Publications Act 1984.

Lim's trial began on 20 June 1995. On 28 April 1997, he was found guilty and was given a fine of RM15,000 by the high court. However, following the dismissal of his appeal, the verdict was soon changed to two simultaneous 18-month prison terms. This meant he was disqualified from his parliamentary seat and barred from any elections for five years. He was imprisoned for 12 months, between 25 August 1998 and August 1999.

== Aftermath ==
The scandal was part of an emerging debate in the country during the early-1990s over gender issues.

In June 1998, 43 members of the UK parliament tabled an early day motion in support of Lim's release. On 25 August, Lim was declared a prisoner of conscience by Amnesty International, who demanded his immediate release. In February 1999, an Inter-Parliamentary Union report cited that Lim's imprisonment failed to comply with international standards.

Lim's conviction ignited popular dissatisfaction against the government and the judicial system, and attracted widespread sympathy from both the Chinese and Malays, as he, a Chinese politician, had put himself in risk for defending a Malay girl and her family, seen as a rare occurrence in the racially-divided country. When he was released from prison in late-August 1999, he was given a welcome by a multiracial crowd, who greeted him as a "hero".

As a response to Lim's actions, Abdul Rahim sued DAP for defamation. In October 2003, he retracted the suit after DAP made a formal apology towards Abdul Rahim. In 2016, Mohamad Sabu was threatened with legal action from Abdul Rahim after comparing Lim's 1998 arrest as a "re-run" of his 2015 corruption charges. In 2020, Abdul Rahim sued DAP again after the party published statements on Malaysiakini and the party website that implicated him in several scandals, including the 1994 rape allegations. In 2025, the lawsuit was ruled in favor of DAP, and he was ordered to pay RM150,000 to DAP and Malaysiakini as reparations.

In 2018, Abdul Rahim alleged that the rape allegations were a "dirty conspiracy" planned to cause the downfall of both himself and Mahathir. He further claimed that his political career, such as staging a pro-Chechen protest during the First Chechen War, brought fame for UMNO and jealousy among his political rivals.

== See also ==
- Reformasi
