= Thomas Brodie (disambiguation) =

Thomas Brodie (1903–1993) was a British Army soldier.

Thomas Brodie or Tom Brodie may also refer to:

- Thomas Brodie (Royal Navy officer) (1779–1811)
- Thomas Dawson Brodie (1832–1896), Scottish lawyer and peer
- Thomas Vernor Alexander Brodie, British lawyer
- Thomas Gregor Brodie (1866–1916), British physiologist
- Thomas L. Brodie (born 1943), Irish theologian
- Tom Brodie (actor) (born 1978), English actor
- T. J. Brodie, Canadian ice hockey defenceman

== See also ==
- Brodie (surname)
- Thomas Brodie-Sangster (born 1990), English actor and musician
