= Selandar (federal constituency) =

Malacca constituency

Defunct federal constituency
- Legislature: Dewan Rakyat
- Constituency created: 1984
- Constituency abolished: 2004
- First contested: 1986
- Last contested: 1999

Selandar was a federal constituency in Malacca, Malaysia, that was represented in the Dewan Rakyat from 1986 to 2004.

The federal constituency was created in the 1984 redistribution and was mandated to return a single member to the Dewan Rakyat under the first past the post voting system.

== History ==
It was abolished in 2004 when it was redistributed.

=== Representation history ===
Members of Parliament for Selandar
Parliament	No	Years	Member	Party	Vote Share
Constituency created from Alor Gajah, Batu Berendam and Jasin
7th	P111	1986-1990	Kok Wee Kiat (郭伟杰)	BN (MCA)	17,864; 70.66%
8th	P111	1990-1995	Fong Chan Onn (冯镇安)	BN (MCA)	19,120; 68.68%
9th	P121	1995-1999	Fong Chan Onn (冯镇安)	BN (MCA)	28,366; 84.54%
10th	P121	1999-2004	Fong Chan Onn (冯镇安)	BN (MCA)	23,955; 65.18%
Constituency abolished, renamed to Alor Gajah

=== State constituency ===
Parliamentary constituency	State constituency						
Parliamentary constituency	1955–59*	1959–1974	1974–1986	1986–1995	1995–2004	2004–2018	2018–present
Selandar				Bukit Asahan			
Selandar					Bukit Sedanan		
Selandar					Durian Tunggal		
Selandar				Kemuning			
Selandar				Pulau Sebang			
Selandar					Rembia		
Selandar				Tebong			

=== Historical boundaries ===
State Constituency	Area	
State Constituency	1984	1994
Bukit Asahan	Asahan; Batang Melaka; FELDA Bukit Senggeh; Nyalas; Simpang Bekoh	Asahan; Batang Melaka; FELDA Bukit Senggeh; Nyalas; Selandar
Bukit Sedanan		FELCRA Bukit Sedanan; Gadek; Kemuning; Tebong; Machap
Durian Tunggal		Durian Tunggal; Kampung Bukit Tambun; Kampung Gangsa; Melaka Pindah; Parit Melana
Kemuning	Belimbing; Gadek; Kemuning; Melaka Pindah; Parit Melana	
Pulau Sebang	Bandar Satelit Sebang; Kampung Bukit Nangka; Kampung Tanjong Rimau; Padang Sebang; Pulau Sebang	
Rembia		Alor Gajah; Kelemak; Rembia; Sungai Petai; Taman Seri Bayu
Tebong	Bukit Kemendor; Durian Tunggal; Machap; Selandar; Tebong	

== Election results ==
Malaysian general election, 1999
Party	Candidate	Votes	%	∆%
BN	Fong Chan Onn	23,055	65.18	▼19.36
PKR	Chua Tian Chang	12,316	34.82	▲34.82
Total valid votes		35,371	100.00	
Total rejected ballots		1,084		
Unreturned ballots		70		
Turnout		36,525	73.70	▼0.10
Registered electors		49,558		
Majority		10,739	30.36	▼38.72
BN hold		Swing		

Malaysian general election, 1995
Party	Candidate	Votes	%	∆%
BN	Fong Chan Onn	28,366	84.54	▲15.86
S46	Burkhan Abdullah	5,186	15.46	▼15.86
Total valid votes		33,552	100.00	
Total rejected ballots		1,497		
Unreturned ballots		111		
Turnout		35,160	73.80	▼1.86
Registered electors		47,641		
Majority		23,180	69.08	▲31.72
BN hold		Swing		

Malaysian general election, 1990
Party	Candidate	Votes	%	∆%
BN	Fong Chan Onn	19,120	68.68	▼1.98
S46	Samat Abdullah	8,719	31.32	▲31.32
Total valid votes		27,839	100.00	
Total rejected ballots		898		
Unreturned ballots		0		
Turnout		28,737	75.66	▲4.96
Registered electors		37,983		
Majority		10,401	37.36	▼3.96
BN hold		Swing		

Malaysian general election, 1986
Party	Candidate	Votes	%
BN	Kok Wee Kiat	17,864	70.66
DAP	Ang Kuang Meng	7,417	29.34
Total valid votes		25,281	100.00
Total rejected ballots		1,098	
Unreturned ballots		0	
Turnout		26,379	70.70
Registered electors		37,313	
Majority		10,447	41.32
This was a new constituency created.
