= Kenneth O'Connor =

British soldier and lawyer, later judge

Sir Kenneth Kennedy O'Connor KBE MC QC (21 December 1896 – 13 January 1985) was a soldier, lawyer and judge who served in the British Colonial Service.

== Early life ==
O'Connor was born in Ranchi, then in the Chota Nagpur Division of the Bengal Presidency of British India. He was the second child of the Revd. William O'Connor and his wife Emma Kennedy. He was educated at the Abbey School, Beckenham, and Saint Columba's College, Dublin, a Church of Ireland boarding school, where he was a chorister and cricketer. From there, he won a choral scholarship to Worcester College, Oxford, but did not take it up, due to his military service during the First World War.

O'Connor had an older sister, Dorothy Georgina Noel O'Connor, who in 1921 was a teacher of modern languages at Wycombe Abbey in Buckinghamshire. By that year, their father was a widower.

O'Connor's father, born in Tuam and a graduate of the Royal University of Ireland, was ordained in 1891 into the Church of Ireland in Armagh. He was a curate at Carlingford, County Louth, then an SPG missionary at Ranchi, Chota Nagpur, from 1892 to 1900, returning home to take up the post of organising secretary of the SPG in Ireland from 1901 to 1913. He then returned to Ranchi until 1915, later holding a benefice in the Diocese of Oxford as Rector of Hedgerley, Buckinghamshire, before in 1929 retiring, having lost heart due to the poor attendance at his parish church. He went to live at Princes Risborough and died in December 1951, aged 89. He was reported to be "a courtly, scholarly clergyman of obvious sincerity".

== India ==
In 1915, O'Connor joined the Cadet College, Quetta, as an Indian Army officer cadet, and from there on 29 June 1916 was commissioned onto the Unattached List. On 2 July 1916 he was attached to the 15th Ludhiana Sikhs, and on 29 June 1917 was promoted to Lieutenant in the 14th King George's Own Ferozepore Sikhs. In 1919, following an action in 1918 during the British campaign in Mesopotamia against the Ottomans, O'Connor was awarded the Military Cross

"...for conspicuous gallantry and devotion to duty at Mushaw on the 26th October 1918. Whilst boldly leading his men across a dry river bed swept by heavy fire he was knocked down by a partially spent bullet and struck by another, which wounded him in the leg. He at once picked himself up and continued to advance to the far side of the river bed, where loss of blood and exhaustion forced him to lie down. He continued to encourage his men and inspired them by his fine example."

O'Connor later wrote a short account of the Battle of Sharqat. After the war, he resigned his commission in the Indian Army, retiring with the rank of Captain. In 1919, he joined the Political Department of the Government of Mesopotamia, then in 1920 the Foreign and Political Department of the Government of India, serving until 1922. In December 1920, he was posted as the Assistant Commissioner in Hazara, a district of the North-West Frontier Province adjoining the Khyber Pass, and was later the District Commissioner in Charsadda.

== Legal career ==
In 1922, O'Connor took the life-changing decision to return to England to train as a barrister. He was admitted to Gray's Inn and was called to the London Bar in 1924. He practiced at the London bar for a few years, then went out to Singapore, where he worked as an advocate until 1941, becoming a partner in the firm of Drew & Napier. He was Chairman of the Straits Settlements Association in the late 1930s and played a key role in planning the civilian evacuation of the island in the event of a Japanese invasion. Having already sent his wife and children to Australia for their safety, before the arrival of the Japanese with three other men he escaped from Singapore in a small open sailing boat, with only a school atlas for navigation. Despite these limitations, the men successfully sailed to Sumatra. O'Connor later wrote a short account of this adventure, entitled Four Men in a Boat. By August 1942 he had joined his family in Adelaide.

== Colonial Legal Service ==
O'Connor joined the Colonial Legal Service and in 1943 was appointed Attorney General of Nyasaland, a British protectorate in Africa. After the war ended in 1945, he returned to Singapore to reconstruct the legal practice of Drew & Napier. In 1946, he was appointed Attorney General of the Malayan Union, and in 1948 as Attorney General of Kenya, travelling by sea from Singapore via London, with his wife and one young son. In Kenya in 1950, he was appointed a King's Counsel. In 1951, O'Connor took up the post of Chief Justice of Jamaica, in which position he served until 1954. He was knighted in 1952.

In 1954, he was recalled to Kenya as Chief Justice, serving until 1957. During his time as Chief Justice of Kenya, the Mau Mau Uprising was at its peak. O'Connor was the senior presiding judge in many Mau Mau trials, the most notable being that of Dedan Kimathi, whom O'Connor sentenced to death in 1957. O'Connor finished his legal career as President of the Court of Appeal for Eastern Africa from 1957 to 1962, with jurisdiction over Kenya, Uganda and Tanganyika.

== Personal life ==
In Singapore, O'Connor met Margaret Helen Wise, the eldest daughter of Percy Furlong Wise MBE. They were married at Eton, Buckinghamshire, in 1928 and had two sons, Anthony, born in 1933, and Hugh, born in 1940. His father-in-law was the manager of the Kepayang Estate, a rubber plantation in Malaya, and retired to Devon, England, in 1930, dying there in November 1940.

With the approaching independence of the British possessions in East Africa, in 1962 O'Connor and his wife retired to Buckland Court, at Buckland, Surrey, England, the home of a friend from Kenya, Sir Arthur Hope-Jones.

In April 1965, the O'Connors' son Hugh was married in Poole, Dorset.

O'Connor's sister Dorothy died unmarried in Surrey in 1969. He died in Westfield Close, Wimborne, Dorset, on 13 January 1985, aged 88 and his widow in Dorset in February 1989, aged 84.

== Selected publications ==
- Guide to the Law of Property Act 1925 ( 1926)
- Editor, Straits Settlements Law Reports
