= Cecil Majella Sheridan =

British lawyer (1911–2000)

Cecil Majella Sheridan CMG

Attorney-General of Federation of Malaya
- In office 1959–1963
- Preceded by: Thomas Vernor Alexander Brodie
- Succeeded by: Abdul Kadir Yusuf

Personal details
- Born: 9 December 1911
- Died: 22 May 2000 (aged 88)
- Children: 2 sons and 1 daughter
- Occupation: Lawyer

Cecil Majella Sheridan CMG (9 December 1911 – 22 May 2000) was a British lawyer who served as the last British Attorney-General of Malaya and was responsible for much of the legal work involved in the formation of Malaysia.

== Early life and education ==
Sheridan was born on 9 December 1911, the son of J.P. Sheridan of Liverpool. He was educated at Ampleforth College. He was admitted as a solicitor in 1934, and was called to the Bar by the Inner Temple in 1952.

== Career ==
Sheridan began his career as a solicitor in Liverpool in 1934, and continued in practice until 1940. During the Second World War he served as a pilot in Royal Air Force Volunteer Reserve (RAFVR) and resigned in 1946 with the honorary rank of Squadron Leader.

Sheridan joined the Colonial Legal Service in 1946 and went to Malaya. There he served as Crown Counsel and Deputy Public Prosecutor, Malayan Union (1946–1948) and Legal Adviser to the Malay States of Pahang, Kelantan, Trengganu and Selangor, and of Penang (1948–1955). He then served as legal draftsman, Federation of Malaya (1955–1957), and Solicitor-General, Federation of Malaya (1957–1959). He was responsible for much of the legal work relating to the formation of Malaysia. From 1959 to 1963, he served as the last British Attorney-General of the Federation of Malaya and Malaysia. From 1962 to 1963, he served on the Inter-Governmental Committees for the Borneo Territories of Sabah and Sarawak, and Singapore.

After retiring to England, Sheridan served as Chairman of the Traffic Commissioners and Licensing Authority, East Midlands (1965–1982), and then as a company director (1984–1993).

== Personal life ==
Sheridan married in 1949, Monica, daughter of Sir Frank Ereaut and they had two sons and a daughter.

== Honours ==
Sheridan was appointed Companion of the Order of St Michael and St George (CMG) in the 1961 Birthday Honours. In 1963, he was awarded the Panglima Mangku Negara.
