= Fong Chan Onn =

Malaysian politician

Yang Berbahagia Tan Sri Datuk Seri Fong Chan Onn PSM DGSM
- 冯镇安

Minister of Human Resources
- In office 15 December 1999 – 18 March 2008
- Monarchs: Salahuddin; Sirajuddin; Mizan Zainal Abidin
- Prime Minister: Mahathir Mohamad; Abdullah Ahmad Badawi
- Deputy: Abdul Latiff Ahmad (1999–2004); Abdul Rahman Bakar (2004–2008)
- Preceded by: Lim Ah Lek
- Succeeded by: Subramaniam Sathasivam
- Constituency: Selandar; Alor Gajah

Deputy Minister of Education
- In office 27 October 1990 – 14 December 1999 Serving with Leo Michael Toyad (1990-1995); Mohd Khalid Mohd Yunos (1995-1999)
- Monarchs: Azlan Shah; Ja'afar; Salahuddin
- Prime Minister: Mahathir Mohamad
- Minister: Anwar Ibrahim (1990-1991); Sulaiman Daud (1991-1995); Najib Razak (1995-1999)
- Preceded by: Woon See Chin
- Succeeded by: Han Choon Kim
- Constituency: Selandar

Member of the Malaysian Parliament for Alor Gajah
- In office 21 March 2004 – 5 May 2013
- Preceded by: Abu Seman Yusop (BN–UMNO)
- Succeeded by: Koh Nai Kwong (BN–MCA)
- Majority: 22,548 (2004); 12,884 (2008)

Member of the Malaysian Parliament for Selandar
- In office 20 October 1990 – 21 March 2004
- Preceded by: Kok Wee Kiat (BN–MCA)
- Succeeded by: Constituency abolished
- Majority: 10,401 (1990); 23,180 (1995); 10,739 (1999)

Malaysian Chinese Association (MCA) Malacca State Liaison Committee chairman
- In office 2007–2008
- Preceded by: Poh Ah Tiam
- Succeeded by: Wee Ka Siong

Personal details
- Born: 29 February 1944 (age 82) Seremban, Negeri Sembilan, Japanese occupation of Malaya (now Malaysia)
- Party: Malaysian Chinese Association (MCA)
- Other political affiliations: Barisan Nasional (BN); Perikatan Nasional (PN)
- Spouse: Tan Lay Hwa (陈丽华)
- Education: University of Canterbury; University of Rochester
- Occupation: Politician
- Profession: Electrical engineer
- Website: fongchanonn.blogspot.com

Fong Chan Onn (simplified Chinese: 冯镇安; traditional Chinese: 馮鎮安; pinyin: Féng Zhèn'ān, born 29 February 1944) is a Malaysian politician and a former Minister of Human Resources. He is a former vice-president of the Malaysian Chinese Association (MCA), a component party of the then-ruling Barisan Nasional (BN) coalition. He served as a Member of Parliament for Selandar from 1999 to 2004 and Alor Gajah from 2004 until 2013.

== Profile ==
Fong received his bachelor's degree in electrical engineering from the University of Canterbury in New Zealand. He went on to receive his MBA and PhD in Operations Research/Industrial Economics from University of Rochester, New York.

He began his career in the civil service as an engineer at the Kuala Lumpur Telecommunications Department. He later joined the Faculty of Economics and Administration at the University of Malaya, rising to become Dean in 1990.

== Political career ==
Fong was elected as the Member of Parliament for Selandar in the 1990, 1995, 1999 general elections and for Alor Gajah constituency in the 2004, 2008 general elections .

Fong became an MCA vice-president in 1996, but stepped down after the 2008 MCA elections when he lost his bid for re-election.

From 1990 to 1999, he served as Deputy Minister of Education. Following the 1999 general elections, Fong was appointed Minister of Human Resources by Prime Minister Mahathir Mohamad. He remained in that ministry until 2008, when he left the Cabinet, and retired from Parliament at the 2013 election.

Post retirement, he became the Chairman of Enterprise Asia, a non-governmental organisation (NGO) that is set up to champion entrepreneurship development in Asia.

== Election results ==
Parliament of Malaysia
Year	Constituency	Candidate	Votes	Pct	Opponent(s)	Votes	Pct	Ballots cast	Majority	Turnout
1990	P111 Selandar	Fong Chan Onn (MCA)	19,120	68.68%	Samat Abdullah (S46)	8,719	31.32%	28,737	10,401	75.66%
1995	P121 Selandar	Fong Chan Onn (MCA)	28,366	84.54%	Burkhan Abdullah (S46)	5,186	15.46%	35,160	23,180	73.80%
1999	P121 Selandar	Fong Chan Onn (MCA)	23,055	65.18%	Chua Tian Chang (keADILan)	12,316	34.82%	36,525	10,739	73.70%
2004	P135 Alor Gajah	Fong Chan Onn (MCA)	29,920	76.05%	Goh Leong San (DAP)	7,372	18.74%	39,343	22,548	76.26%
2008	P135 Alor Gajah	Fong Chan Onn (MCA)	26,354	66.18%	Tan Lay Siang (DAP)	13,470	33.82%	41,854	12,884	77.37%

== Honours ==
=== Honours of Malaysia ===
- Malaysia
  - Commander of the Order of Loyalty to the Crown of Malaysia (PSM) – Tan Sri (2011)
- Malacca
  - Grand Commander of the Exalted Order of Malacca (DGSM) – Datuk Seri (2005)
  - Knight Commander of the Exalted Order of Malacca (DCSM) – Datuk Wira (2003)
  - Companion Class I of the Exalted Order of Malacca (DMSM) – Datuk (1995)

== Personal life ==
Fong is also an avid photographer and has won awards for his images. For two consecutive years he has won The Societies Photographer of Year (2018 and 2019) gaining international success for his photography.

== See also ==
- Selandar (federal constituency)
- Alor Gajah (federal constituency)
