= Mohd Adib Mohamad Adam =

Malaysian politician (1941–2022)

Yang Berbahagia Datuk Seri Mohd Adib Mohamad Adam DGSM

5th Chief Minister of Malacca
- In office 11 July 1978 – 26 April 1982
- Governor: Syed Zahiruddin Syed Hassan
- Preceded by: Abdul Ghani Ali
- Succeeded by: Abdul Rahim Thamby Chik

Minister of Lands and Regional Development
- In office 17 July 1984 – 11 August 1986
- Preceded by: Rais Yatim
- Succeeded by: Sulaiman Daud

Minister of Information
- In office 1982–1984
- Preceded by: Mohamed Rahmat
- Succeeded by: Rais Yatim

Member of the Malaysian Parliament for Alor Gajah
- In office 14 June 1982 – 3 October 1990
- Preceded by: Abdul Rahim Thamby Chik
- Succeeded by: Ibrahim Jendol
- Majority: 15,852 (1986); 20,068 (1982)

Member of the Malacca State Legislative Assembly for Ayer Panas
- In office 1978–1982
- Preceded by: Hashim Yusoff
- Succeeded by: Mat Aris Konil

Personal details
- Born: Mohd Adib bin Mohamad Adam; 3 July 1941
- Died: 21 September 2022 (aged 81) Kuala Lumpur, Malaysia
- Resting place: Makam Pahlawan Negeri, Masjid Al Azim, Malacca
- Citizenship: Malaysian
- Party: Malaysian United Indigenous Party (BERSATU) (2019–2022); United Malays National Organisation (UMNO) (–2018)
- Other political affiliations: Barisan Nasional (BN) (– 2018, aligned; 2020–2022); Pakatan Harapan (PH) (2018–2020); Perikatan Nasional (PN) (2020–2022)
- Spouse: Zainiah Hussein
- Children: Ahmad Azam; Ahmad Azuwar; Aida; Azdarlina
- Occupation: Politician, Corporate member

Mohd Adib bin Mohamad Adam (3 July 1941 – 21 September 2022) was a Malaysian politician who served as the 5th Chief Minister of Malacca from July 1978 to April 1982, Minister of Lands and Regional Development from 1984 to 1986 and Minister of Information from 1982 to 1984. He was a member of the United Malays National Organisation (UMNO), a component party of the Barisan Nasional (BN) coalition and member of the Malaysian United Indigenous Party (BERSATU), presently a component party of the Perikatan Nasional (PN) coalition and formerly Pakatan Harapan (PH) coalition.

== Education and early career ==
He attended Sekolah Menengah Kebangsaan Tinggi Melaka for his secondary education.

Adib served as the Assistant District Officer in Kuala Selangor. He then resigned to become the executive secretary at the headquarters of UMNO at Putra World Trade Centre (PWTC). In 1971, he was appointed the Information Attaché to the Malaysia Embassy in Netherlands.

== Politics ==
After Adib won the Malacca state assembly seat of Ayer Panas in the 1978 general election, he replace Datuk Setia Haji Abdul Ghani Ali as the new Chief Minister of Malacca. He was only 37 years old and he served as Chief Minister for four years from 11 July 1978 to 26 April 1982. He was then replaced by Tan Sri Abdul Rahim Thamby Chik in 1982 by Mahathir Mohamad who became the new Prime Minister earlier in 1981.

Adib contested the parliamentary seat of Alor Gajah, Malacca in the subsequent 1982 general election and he won to be the Member of Parliament. He was then selected to be the Minister of Information replacing Dato' Mohamed Rahmat who was appointed ambassador to Jakarta, Indonesia. He served in that portfolio for two years (1982–1984) before he was appointed as Minister of Lands and Regional Development (1984–1986).

== Personal life and death ==
Adib had four children. He died in Kuala Lumpur on 21 September 2022, at the age of 81.

== Biography book ==
- Dato Seri Adib bin Adam - by Siti Rohana Omar.

== Election results ==
Parliament of Malaysia
Year	Constituency	Candidate	Votes	Pct	Opponent(s)	Votes	Pct	Ballots cast	Majority	Turnout
1982	P095 Alor Gajah	Mohd Adib Mohamad Adam (UMNO)	25,342	72.50%	Lim Swee (DAP)	5,274	15.09%	36,070	20,068	74.47%
1982	P095 Alor Gajah	Mohd Adib Mohamad Adam (UMNO)	25,342	72.50%	Abdul Rahman Hassan (PAS)	4,340	12.42%	36,070	20,068	74.47%
1986	P110 Alor Gajah	Mohd Adib Mohamad Adam (UMNO)	19,770	83.46%	Ab Rahman Hasan (PAS)	3,918	16.54%	24,446	15,852	69.91%

== Honours ==
- Malacca
  - Grand Commander of the Exalted Order of Malacca (DGSM) – Datuk Seri (1983)

Political offices
Preceded by Abdul Ghani Ali	Chief Minister of Melaka; 11 Julai 1978 – 26 April 1982	Succeeded by Abdul Rahim Thamby Chik
