= Mohtar Abdullah =

Attorney General of Malaysia

Yang Berbahagia Tan Sri Mohtar Abdullah PMN PSM SJMK DGSM KMN

6th Attorney General of Malaysia
- In office 1994–2000
- Preceded by: Abu Talib Othman
- Succeeded by: Ainum Mohd Saaid

Personal details
- Born: 7 May 1944 Masjid Tanah, Malacca, Japanese occupation of Malaya
- Died: 7 July 2003 (aged 59) Kuala Lumpur, Malaysia
- Resting place: Bukit Kiara Muslim Cemetery, Kuala Lumpur
- Spouse: Zaleha Shukor
- Education: University of Singapore
- Profession: Lawyer

Mohtar bin Abdullah (7 May 1944 – 7 July 2003) was a Malaysian lawyer. He was the Attorney General of Malaysia from 1994 to 2000 and also served as a judge in the High Court and Federal Court.

Mohtar's term as Attorney General was marred by the controversy surrounding the 1998 sodomy trial of former Deputy Prime Minister Anwar Ibrahim.

== Biography ==
Mohtar studied at the University of Singapore. He entered the judicial and legal service in 1971. He served as a judge on the High Court from 1990 to 1994 before being appointed Attorney General. After his tenure as Attorney General, he was appointed to the Federal Court in January 2002.

Less than three months into his term, he suffered a stroke. After surgery to remove a blood clot in his brain, Mohtar fell into coma for a nearly year. He died on 7 July 2003, in Kuala Lumpur Hospital aged 59.

== Honours ==
=== Honours of Malaysia ===
- Malaysia
  - Officer of the Order of the Defender of the Realm (KMN) (1983)
  - Commander of the Order of Loyalty to the Crown of Malaysia (PSM) – Tan Sri (1996)
  - Commander of the Order of the Defender of the Realm (PMN) – Tan Sri (1999)
- Kelantan
  - Knight Grand Commander of the Order of the Life of the Crown of Kelantan (SJMK) – Dato' (1998)
- Malacca
  - Grand Commander of the Exalted Order of Malacca (DGSM) – Datuk Seri (1998)

== See also ==
- 1994 Malacca rape scandal
