= Thomas Vernor Alexander Brodie =

British colonial administrator (1907–1975)

Attorney-General of Federation of Malaya
- In office 1955–1959
- Preceded by: Michael Joseph Hogan
- Succeeded by: Cecil Majella Sheridan

Personal details
- Born: 9 October 1907
- Died: 13 November 1975 (aged 68)
- Children: 1 daughter
- Education: Brasenose College, Oxford
- Occupation: Lawyer

Thomas Vernor Alexander Brodie (9 October 1907 – 13 November 1975) was a British lawyer who served as Attorney-General of the Federation of Malaya from 1955 to 1959.

== Early life an education ==
Brodie was born on 9 October 1907 in Richmond, London the son of Norman Brodie of the Indian Civil Service. He was educated at Marlborough College and Brasenose College, Oxford where he read Law and Classics. He was called to the Bar by the Middle Temple in 1931.

== Career ==
Brodie joined the Colonial Legal Service in 1938 as Assistant Legal Advisor to the Federated Malay States and served in Perak and Kuala Lumpur. In the same year, he was appointed Crown Counsel, Straits Settlements. In 1941, he joined the Federation Volunteer Force, served in the Malayan campaign, was captured by the Japanese army, and from 1942 to 1945 incarcerated as a POW Changi Prison, Singapore, where he contracted diphtheria.

After the Second World War, he rejoined the Colonial Legal Service in Malaya. In 1947, served as Custodian of Enemy Property, Official Assignee and Public Trustee of Singapore, and in 1949 served as Deputy Public Prosecutor for Singapore. In 1950 was appointed Solicitor-General of the Federation of Malaya. While serving in the post, he was appointed QC (Malaya) in 1952, and drafted the Emergency Regulations.

In 1955, he was appointed Attorney-General of Federation of Malaya, having served as acting Attorney-General during the previous three years. While in office he was responsible for preparing new legislation. He played a leading role in the drafting of the Constitution of the Federation of Malaya while serving as a member of the working committee which reviewed the terms of the new constitution proposed by the Reid Commission. He retired in 1959.

== Personal life and death ==
Brodie married Mollie Chubb in 1947 and they had a daughter.

Brodie died on 13 November 1975, aged 68.

== Honours ==
In 1958, Brodie received the Malaysian honour, Panglima Mangku Negara (Hon).
