= Mas Ermieyati Samsudin =

Malaysian politician

Yang Berhormat Datuk Wira Mas Ermieyati Samsudin DCSM DMSM DSM BCM PJK ANS MP
- مس إرمياتي شمس الدين
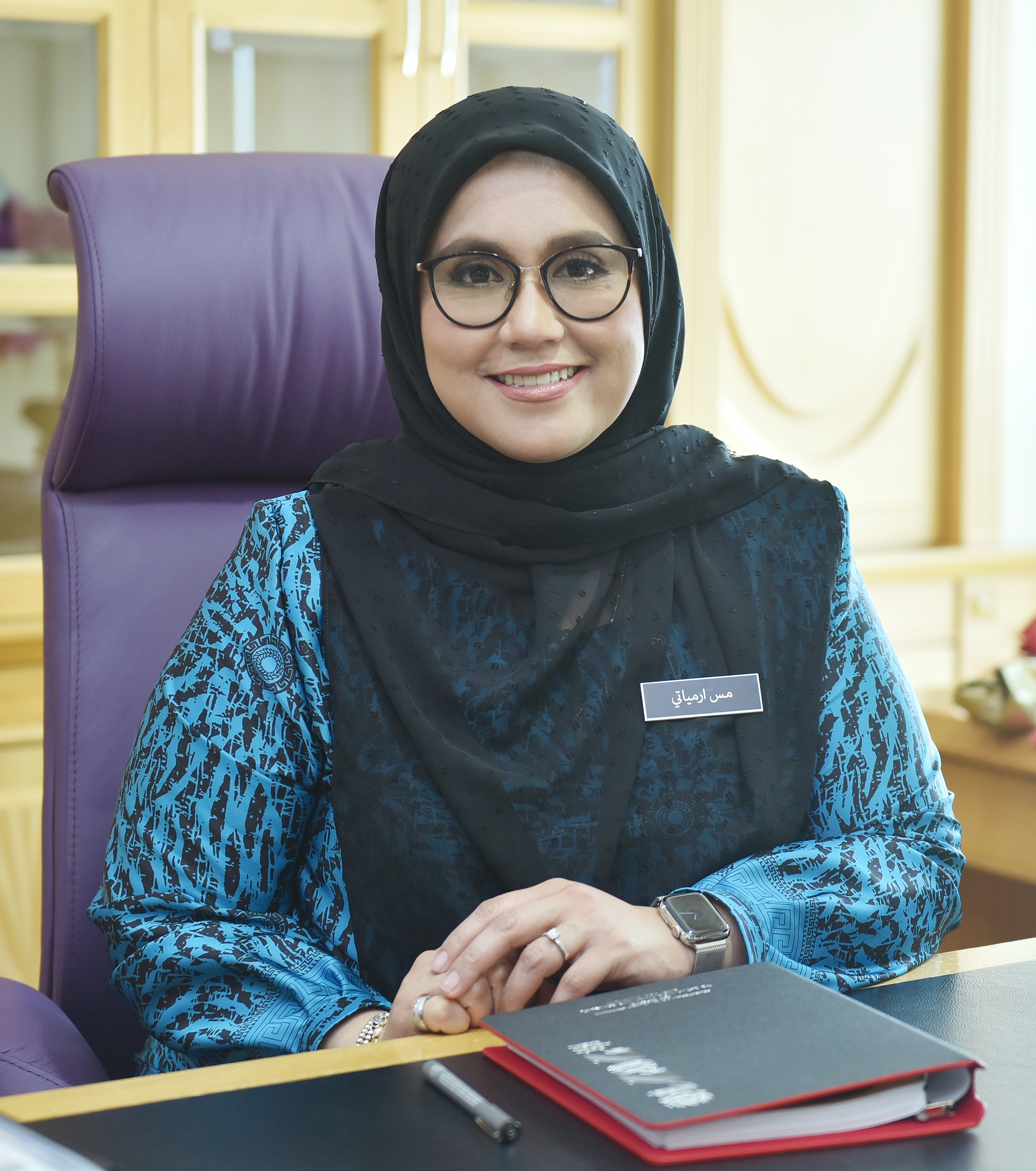

Chairperson of the Public Accounts Committee
- Incumbent
- Assumed office 4 April 2023
- Nominated by: Anwar Ibrahim
- Appointed by: Johari Abdul
- Deputy: Wong Shu Qi (2023–2024); Teresa Kok Suh Sim (since 2024)
- Preceded by: Wong Kah Woh
- Constituency: Masjid Tanah

Deputy Minister in the Prime Minister's Department (Parliament and Law)
- In office 30 August 2021 – 24 November 2022
- Monarch: Abdullah
- Prime Minister: Ismail Sabri Yaakob
- Minister: Wan Junaidi Tuanku Jaafar
- Preceded by: Shabudin Yahaya
- Succeeded by: Ramkarpal Singh
- Constituency: Masjid Tanah

Deputy Minister of Entrepreneur Development and Cooperatives
- In office 10 March 2020 – 16 August 2021
- Monarch: Abdullah
- Prime Minister: Muhyiddin Yassin
- Minister: Wan Junaidi
- Preceded by: Mohd Hatta Ramli (Deputy Minister of Entrepreneur Development)
- Succeeded by: Muslimin Yahaya
- Constituency: Masjid Tanah

Deputy Minister of Tourism and Culture
- In office 29 July 2015 – 10 May 2018
- Monarchs: Abdul Halim (2015–2016); Muhammad V (2016–2018)
- Prime Minister: Najib Razak
- Minister: Mohamed Nazri Abdul Aziz
- Preceded by: James Dawos Mamit (Deputy Minister of Tourism); Joseph Salang Gandum (Deputy Minister of Information, Communication and Culture I); Maglin Dennis D'Cruz (Deputy Minister of Information, Communication and Culture II)
- Succeeded by: Muhammad Bakhtiar Wan Chik (Deputy Minister of Tourism, Arts and Culture)
- Constituency: Masjid Tanah

Member of the Malaysian Parliament for Masjid Tanah
- Incumbent
- Assumed office 5 May 2013
- Preceded by: Abu Seman Yusop (BN–UMNO)
- Majority: 16,200 (2013); 8,159 (2018); 4,411 (2022)

2nd Women Chief of the Malaysian United Indigenous Party
- Incumbent
- Assumed office 28 October 2024
- President: Muhyiddin Yassin
- Vice Women Chief: Nolee Ashilin Mohammed Radzi
- Preceded by: Rina Harun

2nd Vice Women Chief of the Malaysian United Indigenous Party
- In office 16 August 2020 – 28 October 2024
- President: Muhyiddin Yassin
- Women Chief: Rina Harun
- Preceded by: Shamsilah Siru
- Succeeded by: Nolee Ashilin Mohammed Radzi

4th Women Youth Chief of the United Malays National Organisation
- In office 12 October 2013 – 24 June 2018
- President: Najib Razak
- Vice Women Youth Chief: Zahida Zarik Khan
- Preceded by: Rosnah Shirlin
- Succeeded by: Zahida Zarik Khan

Faction represented in Dewan Rakyat
- 2013–2018: Barisan Nasional
- 2018: Independent
- 2019–2020: Pakatan Harapan
- 2020: Malaysian United Indigenous Party
- 2020–: Perikatan Nasional

Personal details
- Born: Mas Ermieyati binti Samsudin; 13 November 1976 (age 49) Malacca General Hospital, Malacca, Malaysia
- Citizenship: Malaysian
- Party: UMNO (2001–2018); Independent (2018); BERSATU (since 2019, suspended since 2026); National Vision Party (Malaysia) (WAWASAN) (since 2026)
- Other political affiliations: Barisan Nasional (BN) (2001–2018); Pakatan Harapan (PH) (2019–2020); Perikatan Nasional (PN) (since 2020)
- Spouse: Mohd Helmy Abd Talib
- Children: 5 (4 sons and 1 daughter)
- Parents: Samsudin Md. Ali (father); Salbiah Ahmad (mother)
- Education: National University of Malaysia
- Occupation: Politician
- Profession: Lawyer
- Website: emysamsudin.blogspot.com
- Mas Ermieyati Samsudin on Facebook; Mas Ermieyati Samsudin on Parliament of Malaysia

Mas Ermieyati binti Samsudin (Jawi: مس إرمياتي بنت شمس الدين; born 13 November 1976) is a Malaysian politician and lawyer who has served as Chairperson of the Public Accounts Committee (PAC) since April 2023 and as the Member of Parliament (MP) for Masjid Tanah since May 2013. She served as Deputy Minister in the Prime Minister's Department in charge of Parliament and Law in the Barisan Nasional (BN) administration under former prime minister Ismail Sabri Yaakob and former Minister Wan Junaidi Tuanku Jaafar from August 2021 to the collapse of BN administration in November 2022, Deputy Minister of Entrepreneur Development and Cooperatives in the Perikatan Nasional (PN) administration under former Prime Minister Muhyiddin Yassin and former Minister Wan Junaidi Tuanku Jaafar from March 2020 to the collapse of the PN administration in August 2021 and the Deputy Minister of Tourism and Culture in the BN administration under former Prime Minister Najib Razak and former Minister Mohamed Nazri Abdul Aziz from July 2015 to the collapse of the BN administration in May 2018. She is a member and the Women Chief of the Malaysian United Indigenous Party (BERSATU), a component party of the PN coalition and was a member of United Malays National Organisation (UMNO), a component party of the BN coalition. She has previously served as the 2nd Vice Women Chief of BERSATU from August 2020 to October 2024 and the Women Youth Chief of UMNO from October 2013 to June 2018. After the defeat of BN to the Pakatan Harapan (PH) opposition coalition in the 2018 general election, she resigned from UMNO in 2018 and joined BERSATU in 2019. She is also the second female PAC Chairperson after Noraini Ahmad in Malaysian history.

== Early life and educations ==
She was born on 13 November 1976 at the Malacca General Hospital and is the second child of Hjh Salbiah Ahmad and Hj Samsudin Md Ali. Raised in Malacca and earned an early education at Methodist Girls School (2) Tengkera, Melaka and Sekolah Kebangsaan Ramuan China Besar, Masjid Tanah Melaka. She then received an offer to Full Boarding School, Sekolah Tun Fatimah, Johor Bahru (1989-1993) and furthered her studies at Law Matriculation and Law Degree in National University of Malaysia (UKM), Bangi, Selangor.

== Career ==
After graduating with a Law Degree from UKM, she started her career as an advocate and solicitor lawyer at Khairul Latif & Associates and Adillah A. Nordin. In 2004, with two partners, Mohd Khairul Nizam Abd Kadir and Desmond Ho Chee Cheong, Mas Ermieyati opened their own legal firm, Messrs. Ermiey Nizam & Ho. The same time of interest in volunteer work is well-suited to the soul. Since school age and as early as 15, she has been active with the Association of Youth Movement 4B (GB4B). She is currently the Member of the GB4B Malaysia Top Council Member. As the MP for Masjid Tanah, she selectively insinuated with unfounded claims that the Anwar government was trying to bring in more permanent residents from China.

== Politics ==
=== Early involvement ===
She was involved in politics since becoming a lawyer in 2001 when the third UMNO wing of PUTERI was agreed by the UMNO President to be established throughout the country. This time she was offered a seat in the sponsorship committee at Alor Gajah. In 2003, she became the Chairwoman of PUTERI UMNO Division of Alor Gajah and the Head of PUTERI State of Melaka (new delineation of 2004 changed to the Masjid Tanah Division) for 10 years until 2013 and during the same period, she was also EXCO PUTERI UMNO Malaysia.

=== General Election 2013 ===
In the 2013 Malaysian general election, Mas Ermieyati was elected the Masjid Tanah MP as the Barisan National candidate, defeating PAS candidate Mohd Nasaie Bin Ismail. She obtained 27,688 votes compared to her opponent's 11,488 votes. She represented Malaysia abroad in conferences such as the 34th General Assembly of the ASEAN Inter-Parliamentary Assembly (AIPA), and the Women In Parliament Forum. In 2014, she represented the Malaysian Parliament in Tehran for the 9th Parliamentary Union of OIC Member States (Puic) Conference and Meetings.

=== Malacca State Election 2021 ===
The 2021 Malacca state election was held on 20 November 2021 following the dissolution of the Malacca State Legislative Assembly on 4 October 2021. The dissolution was triggered by the withdrawal of support from four state assemblymen, which caused the collapse of the Pakatan Harapan–led state government and resulted in a political deadlock. The election was conducted during the COVID-19 pandemic under strict health protocols imposed by the Election Commission of Malaysia. Voter turnout was 65.85%, significantly lower than previous state elections, which was widely attributed to pandemic-related concerns and movement restrictions. Barisan Nasional (BN) won a two-thirds supermajority, securing 21 out of 28 seats, allowing it to form the state government without coalition partners. Pakatan Harapan won five seats, while Perikatan Nasional secured two seats. Following the election, Sulaiman Md Ali was sworn in as the Chief Minister of Malacca on 22 November 2021.

== Personal life ==
She is married to Mohd Helmy Abd Talib and has five children - 4 sons named Haiqal, Hakim, Hafiy and Hasif and a daughter named Eiman Miesha.

== Election results ==
Parliament of Malaysia
Year	Constituency	Candidate	Votes	Pct	Opponent(s)	Votes	Pct	Ballots cast	Majority	Turnout
2013	P134 Masjid Tanah	Mas Ermieyati Samsudin (UMNO)	27,688	70.68%	Nasaie Ismail (PAS)	11,488	29.32%	39,827	16,200	86.67%
2018	P134 Masjid Tanah	Mas Ermieyati Samsudin (UMNO)	22,898	54.10%	Sabirin Ja’afar (BERSATU)	14,739	34.82%	42,325	8,159	83.52%
2018	P134 Masjid Tanah	Mas Ermieyati Samsudin (UMNO)	22,898	54.10%	Mohd Nasir Othman (PAS)	4,688	11.08%	42,325	8,159	83.52%
2022	P134 Masjid Tanah	Mas Ermieyati Samsudin (BERSATU)	25,604	46.77%	Abdul Hakim Abdul Wahid (UMNO)	21,193	38.71%	54,479	4,411	79.15%
2022	P134 Masjid Tanah	Mas Ermieyati Samsudin (BERSATU)	25,604	46.77%	Muthalib Uthman (MUDA)	7,445	13.60%	54,479	4,411	79.15%
2022	P134 Masjid Tanah	Mas Ermieyati Samsudin (BERSATU)	25,604	46.77%	Handrawirawan Abu Bakar (PEJUANG)	507	0.93%	54,479	4,411	79.15%

Malacca State Legislative Assembly
Year	Constituency	Candidate	Votes	Pct	Opponent(s)	Votes	Pct	Ballots cast	Majority	Turnout
2021	N02 Tanjung Bidara	Mas Ermieyati Samsudin (BERSATU)	3,195	44.11%	Ab Rauf Yusoh (UMNO)	3,559	49.14%	7,243	364	71.48%
2021	N02 Tanjung Bidara	Mas Ermieyati Samsudin (BERSATU)	3,195	44.11%	Zainal Hassan (PKR)	489	6.75%	7,243	364	71.48%

== Honours ==
=== Honours of Malaysia ===
- Malaysia
  - Recipient of the 17th Yang di-Pertuan Agong Installation Medal (2024)
- Malacca
  - Knight Commander of the Exalted Order of Malacca (DCSM) – Datuk Wira (2017)
  - Companion Class I of the Exalted Order of Malacca (DMSM) – Datuk (2014)
  - Member of the Exalted Order of Malacca (DSM) (2011)
  - Recipient of the Distinguished Service Star (BCM) (2007)
  - Recipient of the Meritorious Service Medal (PJK) (2004)
- Negeri Sembilan
  - Member of the Order of Loyalty to Negeri Sembilan (ANS) (2008)

== See also ==
- Masjid Tanah (federal constituency)
- Tanjung Bidara (state constituency)
