= Masjid Tanah (federal constituency) =

Federal constituency of Malacca, Malaysia

Masjid Tanah (P134)
Malacca constituency

Federal constituency
- Legislature: Dewan Rakyat
- MP: Mas Ermieyati Samsudin; PN
- Constituency created: 2003
- First contested: 2004
- Last contested: 2022

Demographics
- Population (2020): 95,689
- Electors (2026): 72,207
- Area (km²): 325
- Pop. density (per km²): 294.4

Masjid Tanah is a federal constituency in Alor Gajah District, Malacca, Malaysia, that has been represented in the Dewan Rakyat since 2004.

The federal constituency was created in the 2003 redistribution and is mandated to return a single member to the Dewan Rakyat under the first past the post voting system.

== Demographics ==
Ethnic breakdown of Masjid Tanah's electorate as of 2022
1. Malay (84.1%)
2. Chinese (11.7%)
3. Indian (3.60%)
4. Other ethnicities (0.60%)

As of 2020, Masjid Tanah has a population of 95,689 people.

Age breakdown of Masjid Tanah's electorate as of 2022
1. 18-20 (6.27%)
2. 21-29 (22.3%)
3. 30-39 (21.9%)
4. 40-49 (16.3%)
5. 50-59 (14.4%)
6. 60-69 (10.9%)
7. 70-79 (5.59%)
8. 80-89 (2.00%)
9. above 90 (0.35%)
Gender breakdown of Masjid Tanah's electorate as of 2022
1. Male (48.7%)
2. Female (51.3%)

== History ==
=== Polling districts ===
According to the gazette issued on 5 November 2026, the Masjid Tanah constituency has a total of 30 polling districts.

State constituency	Polling districts	Code	Location
Kuala Linggi（N01）	Tanjung Dahan	134/01/01	SK Kuala Linggi
Kuala Linggi（N01）	Sungai Baru Hilir	134/01/02	SK Ayer Jernih
Kuala Linggi（N01）	Kampung Tengah	134/01/03	SK Kampung Tengah
Kuala Linggi（N01）	Permatang	134/01/04	SK Othman Shawal
Kuala Linggi（N01）	Kuala Sungai Baru	134/01/05	SJK (C) Yok Sin
Kuala Linggi（N01）	Paya Mengkuang	134/01/06	SK Sungai Tuang
Kuala Linggi（N01）	Telok Gong	134/01/07	SMK Rahmat
Tanjung Bidara (N02)	Kampung Pulau	134/02/01	SK Jeram
Tanjung Bidara (N02)	Lubok Redan	134/02/02	SK Lubok Redan
Tanjung Bidara (N02)	Sungai Baru Tengah	134/02/03	Kolej Matrikulasi Melaka
Tanjung Bidara (N02)	Pengkalan Balak	134/02/04	SK Pengkalan Balak
Tanjung Bidara (N02)	Pasir Gembor	134/02/05	SK Tanjong Bidara
Ayer Limau (N03)	Sungai Siput	134/03/01	SK Sungai Siput
Ayer Limau (N03)	Sungai Jerneh	134/03/02	SK Sungai Jernih
Ayer Limau (N03)	Ramuan China Kechil	134/03/03	SMK Lubok China
Ayer Limau (N03)	FELCRA Ramuan China Kechil	134/03/04	SRA (JAIM) Ramuan China Kechil
Ayer Limau (N03)	Ramuan China Besar	134/05/05	SK Ramuan China Besar
Ayer Limau (N03)	Kampung Lekok	134/03/06	SK Demang Taha; SRA (JAIM) Paya Rumput, Masjid Tanah
Ayer Limau (N03)	Kampung Pinang	134/03/07	SK Ayer Limau
Lendu (N04)	Pekan Masjid Tanah	134/04/01	SK Sri Laksamana; SJK (C) Masjid Tanah
Lendu (N04)	Durian Daun	134/04/02	SK Durian Daun
Lendu (N04)	Sungai Baru Hulu	134/04/03	SK Datuk Tambichik Karim; SM Sains Datuk Setia Abdul Ghani Ali
Lendu (N04)	Pekan Lendu	134/04/04	SJK (C) Lendu
Taboh Naning (N05)	Cherana Puteh	134/05/01	SK Cherana Puteh
Taboh Naning (N05)	Simpang Empat	134/05/02	SK Simpang Empat
Taboh Naning (N05)	Berisu	134/05/03	SK Berisu
Taboh Naning (N05)	Sungai Buloh	134/05/04	SK Sungai Buloh
Taboh Naning (N05)	Batang Melekek	134/05/05	SK Melekek
Taboh Naning (N05)	Rantau Panjang	134/05/06	SK Rantau Panjang
Taboh Naning (N05)	Ayer Paabas	132/05/07	SK Ayer Pa'abas

=== Representation history ===
Members of Parliament for Masjid Tanah
Parliament	No	Years	Member	Party
Constituency created from Alor Gajah
11th	P134	2004–2008	Abu Seman Yusop (ابو سمن يوسوڤ)	BN (UMNO)
12th	P134	2008–2013	Abu Seman Yusop (ابو سمن يوسوڤ)	BN (UMNO)
13th	P134	2013–2018	Mas Ermieyati Samsudin (مس إرمياتي شمس الدين)	BN (UMNO)
14th	P134	2018	Mas Ermieyati Samsudin (مس إرمياتي شمس الدين)	BN (UMNO)
14th	P134	2018–2020	Mas Ermieyati Samsudin (مس إرمياتي شمس الدين)	PH (BERSATU)
14th	P134	2020–2022	Mas Ermieyati Samsudin (مس إرمياتي شمس الدين)	PN (BERSATU)
15th	P134	2022–present	Mas Ermieyati Samsudin (مس إرمياتي شمس الدين)	PN (BERSATU)

=== State constituency ===
Parliamentary constituency	State constituency						
Parliamentary constituency	1955–59*	1959–1974	1974–1986	1986–1995	1995–2004	2004–2018	2018–present
Masjid Tanah						Ayer Limau	
Masjid Tanah						Kuala Linggi	
Masjid Tanah						Lendu	
Masjid Tanah						Taboh Naning	
Masjid Tanah						Tanjung Bidara	

=== Historical boundaries ===
State Constituency	Area	
State Constituency	2003	2018
Ayer Limau	Ayer Limau; Lubok China; Paya Lebar; Ramuan China; Taman Datuk Setia	
Kuala Linggi	Kuala Linggi; Kampung Ayer Molek; Kampung Man Lok; Kuala Sungai Baru; Taman Kuala Permai	
Lendu	Kampung Bukit Hantu; Lendu; Masjid Tanah; Sungai Baru Ulu; Taman Makmur	
Taboh Naning	Ayer Pa'abas; Brisu; Kampung Seri Kendong; Simpang Ampat; Taboh Naning	
Tanjung Bidara	Air Hitam Darat; Kampung Seri Jeram; Pengkalan Balak; Seruling Jaya; Tanjung Bidara	

=== Current state assembly members ===
No.	State Constituency	Member	Coalition (Party)
N01	Kuala Linggi	Rosli Abdullah	BN (UMNO)
N02	Tanjung Bidara	Ab Rauf Yusoh	BN (UMNO)
N03	Ayer Limau	Hameed Mytheen Kunju Basheer	BN (UMNO)
N04	Lendu	Abdul Hakim Abdul Wahid	BN (UMNO)
N05	Taboh Naning	Zulkiflee Mohd Zin	BN (UMNO)

=== Local governments & postcodes ===
No.	State Constituency	Local Government	Postcode
N01	Kuala Linggi	Alor Gajah Municipal Council	76300 Sungai Udang; 76450 Melaka; 78000 Alor Gajah; 78100 Lubok China; 78200 Kuala Sungai Baru; 78300 Masjid Tanah
N02	Tanjung Bidara	Alor Gajah Municipal Council	76300 Sungai Udang; 76450 Melaka; 78000 Alor Gajah; 78100 Lubok China; 78200 Kuala Sungai Baru; 78300 Masjid Tanah
N03	Ayer Limau	Alor Gajah Municipal Council	76300 Sungai Udang; 76450 Melaka; 78000 Alor Gajah; 78100 Lubok China; 78200 Kuala Sungai Baru; 78300 Masjid Tanah
N04	Lendu	Alor Gajah Municipal Council	76300 Sungai Udang; 76450 Melaka; 78000 Alor Gajah; 78100 Lubok China; 78200 Kuala Sungai Baru; 78300 Masjid Tanah
N05	Taboh Naning	Alor Gajah Municipal Council	76300 Sungai Udang; 76450 Melaka; 78000 Alor Gajah; 78100 Lubok China; 78200 Kuala Sungai Baru; 78300 Masjid Tanah

== Election results ==
Malaysian general election, 2022
Party	Candidate	Votes	%	∆%
PN	Mas Ermieyati Samsudin	25,604	46.77	▲46.77
BN	Abdul Hakim Abdul Wahid	21,193	38.71	▼15.39
MUDA	Muthalib Uthman	7,445	13.60	▲13.60
GTA	Handrawirawan Abu Bakar	507	0.93	▲0.93
Total valid votes		54,749	100.00	
Total rejected ballots		406		
Unreturned ballots		115		
Turnout		55,270	79.90	▼3.87
Registered electors		69,174		
Majority		4,411	8.06	▼11.22
PN gain from BN		Swing		?
Source(s) https://lom.agc.gov.my/ilims/upload/portal/akta/outputp/1753258/PUB%20616%20PARLIMEN%20MELAKA.pdf

Malaysian general election, 2018
Party	Candidate	Votes	%	∆%
BN	Mas Ermieyati Samsudin	22,898	54.10	▼16.58
PKR	Sabirin Ja'afar	14,739	34.82	▲34.82
PAS	Mohd Nasir Othman	4,688	11.08	▼18.24
Total valid votes		42,325	100.00	
Total rejected ballots		636		
Unreturned ballots		132		
Turnout		43,093	83.77	▼2.90
Registered electors		51,441		
Majority		8,159	19.28	▼22.08
BN hold		Swing		
Source(s) "His Majesty's Government Gazette - Notice of Contested Election, Parliament for the State of Malacca [P.U. (B) 243/2018]" (PDF). Attorney General's Chambers of Malaysia. 3 May 2018. "Federal Government Gazette - Results of Contested Election and Statements of the Poll after the Official Addition of Votes, Parliamentary Constituencies for the State of Malacca [P.U. (B) 317/2018]" (PDF). Attorney General's Chambers of Malaysia. 28 May 2018. Archived from the original (PDF) on 2019-12-29.

Malaysian general election, 2013
Party	Candidate	Votes	%	∆%
BN	Mas Ermieyati Samsudin	27,688	70.68	▲0.79
PAS	Nasaie Ismail	11,488	29.32	▼0.79
Total valid votes		39,176	100.00	
Total rejected ballots		566		
Unreturned ballots		85		
Turnout		39,827	86.67	▲8.57
Registered electors		45,952		
Majority		16,200	41.36	▲1.58
BN hold		Swing		
Source(s) "Federal Government Gazette - Notice of Contested Election, Parliament for the State of Malacca [P.U. (B) 180/2013]" (PDF). Attorney General's Chambers of Malaysia. 26 April 2013. "Federal Government Gazette - Results of Contested Election and Statements of the Poll after the Official Addition of Votes, Parliamentary Constituencies for the State of Malacca [P.U. (B) 221/2013]" (PDF). Attorney General's Chambers of Malaysia. 22 May 2013.

Malaysian general election, 2008
Party	Candidate	Votes	%	∆%
BN	Abu Seman Yusop	21,582	69.89	▼10.80
PAS	Ab Ghani Ab Rahman	9,297	30.11	▲10.80
Total valid votes		30,879	100.00	
Total rejected ballots		717		
Unreturned ballots		119		
Turnout		31,715	78.10	▼0.88
Registered electors		40,606		
Majority		12,285	39.78	▼21.60
BN hold		Swing		

Malaysian general election, 2004
Party	Candidate	Votes	%
BN	Abu Seman Yusop	24,188	80.69
PAS	Muhamad Burok	5,789	19.31
Total valid votes		29,977	100.00
Total rejected ballots		745	
Unreturned ballots		85	
Turnout		30,807	78.98
Registered electors		39,006	
Majority		18,399	61.38
This was a new constituency created.
