= Pengkalan Balak Beach =

Beach in Alor Gajah, Malacca, Malaysia

Pengkalan Balak Beach Pantai Pengkalan Balak (Malay)
- beach
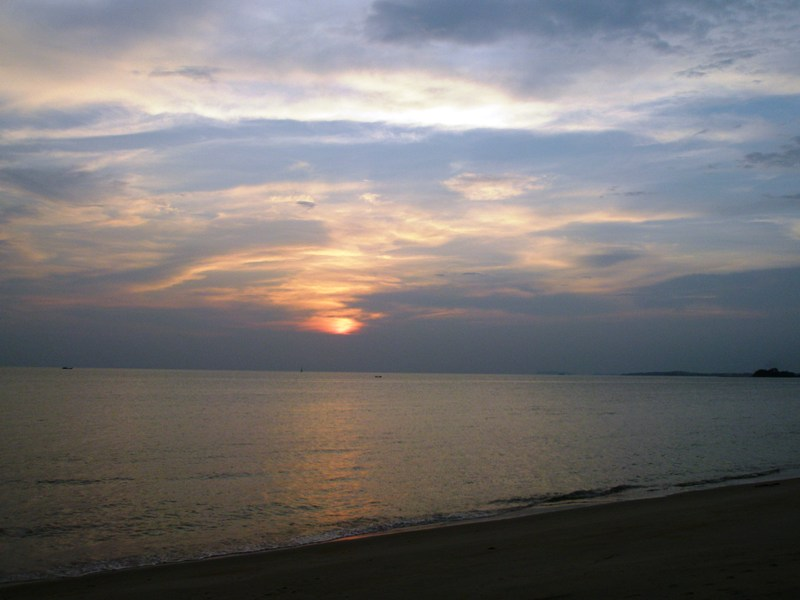

- Location within Malacca
- Coordinates: 2°18′39.3″N 102°04′25.9″E
- Location: Masjid Tanah, Alor Gajah District, Malacca, Malaysia

Pengkalan Balak Beach (Malay: Pantai Pengkalan Balak) is a beach in Masjid Tanah, Alor Gajah District, Melaka, Malaysia. It is one of the important landing sites of the hawksbill turtles in the state.

A turtle conservation and information centre was set up by the Department of Fisheries at the Padang Kemunting Village to protect the species. The beach features turtle sculptures, which were installed by Alor Gajah Municipal Council on 28 December 2020 with a cost of RM20,000.

== Sports and recreation ==
- Hang Jebat Sailing Centre - A Sailing Training Centre owned by the Malacca Stadium Corporation.

== See also ==
- Geography of Malaysia
- List of tourist attractions in Malacca
