= Durian Tunggal (state constituency) =

State constituency in Melaka, Malaysia

Durian Tunggal (N09)
Malacca constituency

State constituency
- Legislature: Malacca State Legislative Assembly
MLA
Mustafa Musa
BN
- Constituency created: 1994
- First contested: 1995
- Last contested: 2026

Demographics
- Electors (2026): 21,181

N09 Durian Tunggal within Malacca, as used for the 2021 state election

Durian Tunggal is a state constituency in Malacca, Malaysia, that has been represented in the Melaka State Legislative Assembly.

The state constituency was first contested in 1995 and is mandated to return a single Assemblyman to the Melaka State Legislative Assembly under the first-past-the-post voting system. Since 2021, the State Assemblyman for Durian Tunggal is Zahari Abdul Khalil from United Malays National Organisation (UMNO) which is part of the state's ruling coalition, Barisan National (BN).

== Definition ==
The Durian Tunggal constituency contains the polling districts of Parit Melana, Belimbing Dalam, Bukit Tambun, Pekan Durian Tunggal and Gangsa.

== Demographics ==
Ethnic breakdown of Durian Tunggal's electorate as of 2026
1. Malays (67.0%)
2. Chinese (22.9%)
3. Indians (8.60%)
4. Other Ethnicities (1.60%)

== History ==
=== Polling districts ===
According to the gazette issued on 5 November 2026, the Durian Tunggal constituency has a total of 5 polling districts.

State constituency	Polling districts	Code	Location
Durian Tunggal (N09)	Parit Melana	135/09/01	SK Parit Melana
Durian Tunggal (N09)	Belimbing Dalam	135/09/02	SK Belimbing Dalam
Durian Tunggal (N09)	Bukit Tambun	135/09/03	SK Durian Tungal; SRA (JAIM) Durian Tunggal
Durian Tunggal (N09)	Pekan Durian Tungal	135/09/04	SMK Durian Tungal
Durian Tunggal (N09)	Gangsa	135/09/05	SK Gangsa; SJK (C) Chabau

=== Representation history ===
Members of the Legislative Assembly for Durian Tunggal
Assembly	No	Years	Member	Party
Constituency created from Tebong and Kemuning
9th	N09	1995–1999	Sahar Arpan	BN (UMNO)
10th	N09	1999–2004	Abdul Karim Daud	BN (UMNO)
11th	N09	2004–2008	Hamdin Abdollah	BN (UMNO)
12th	N09	2008–2013	Ab Wahab Ab Latip	BN (UMNO)
13th	N09	2013–2018	Ab Wahab Ab Latip	BN (UMNO)
14th	N09	2018–2021	Mohd Sofi Abdul Wahab	PH (AMANAH)
15th	N09	2021 – 2026	Zahari Abd Khalil	BN (UMNO)
16th	N09	2026 – present	Mustafa Musa	BN (UMNO)

== Election results ==
Malacca state election, 2026
Party	Candidate	Votes	%	∆%
BN	Mustafa Musa	10,141	64.86	▲24.31
PH	Asyraf Minghat	5,494	35.14	▲0.78
Total valid votes		15,635	100.00	
Total rejected ballots		125		
Unreturned ballots		29		
Turnout		15,789	74.54	▲4.93
Registered electors		21,181		
Majority		4,647	29.72	▲23.53
BN hold		Swing		
Source(s) https://electiondata.my/elections/mlk/SE-16/

Malacca state election, 2021
Party	Candidate	Votes	%	∆%
BN	Zahari Abd Khalil	3,663	40.55	▲0.29
PH	Mohd Sofi Abdul Wahab	3,104	34.36	▲34.36
PN	Ja'afar Othman	2,208	24.44	▲24.44
Independent	Mohd Erfan Mahrilar	58	0.64	▲0.64
Total valid votes		9,033	100.00	
Total rejected ballots		216		
Unreturned ballots		68		
Turnout		9,267	69.61	▼16.71
Registered electors		13,312		
Majority		559	6.19	▼0.71
BN gain from PKR		Swing		?
Source(s) https://lom.agc.gov.my/ilims/upload/portal/akta/outputp/1715764/PUB%20583.pdf

Malacca state election, 2018
Party	Candidate	Votes	%	∆%
PKR	Mohd Sofi Abdul Wahab	5,213	47.16	▲47.16
BN	Ab Wahab Ab Latip	4,450	40.26	▼16.34
PAS	Mohsin Ibrahim	1,391	12.58	▲12.58
Total valid votes		11,054	100.00	
Total rejected ballots		202		
Unreturned ballots		33		
Turnout		11,289	86.32	▼3.30
Registered electors		13,078		
Majority		763	6.90	▼6.30
PKR gain from BN		Swing		?

Malacca state election, 2013
Party	Candidate	Votes	%	∆%
BN	Ab Wahab Ab Latip	5,645	56.60	▼3.71
PAS	Adly Zahari	4,329	43.40	▲3.71
Total valid votes		9,974	100.00	
Total rejected ballots		159		
Unreturned ballots		0		
Turnout		10,133	89.62	▲7.29
Registered electors		11,306		
Majority		1,316	13.20	▼7.42
BN hold		Swing		
Source(s) "Federal Government Gazette – Notice of Contested Election, State Legislative Assembly for the State of Selangor [P.U. (B) 192/2013]" (PDF). Attorney General's Chambers of Malaysia. 26 April 2013. Archived from the original (PDF) on 2019-12-29. "Federal Government Gazette – Results of Contested Election and Statements of the Poll after the Official Addition of Votes, State Constituencies for the State of Selangor [P.U. (B) 233/2013]" (PDF). Attorney General's Chambers of Malaysia. 22 May 2013. Archived from the original (PDF) on 2018-10-02.

Malacca state election, 2008
Party	Candidate	Votes	%	∆%
BN	Ab Wahab Ab Latip	4,317	60.31	▼10.69
PAS	Ab Ghani Ab Rahman	2,841	39.69	▲10.69
Total valid votes		7,158	100.00	
Total rejected ballots		173		
Unreturned ballots		12		
Turnout		7,343	82.33	▲1.05
Registered electors		8,933		
Majority		1,476	20.62	▼21.38
BN hold		Swing		

Malacca state election, 2004
Party	Candidate	Votes	%	∆%
BN	Hamdin Abdollah	4,496	71.00	▲8.60
PAS	Minghat Mamut	1,836	29.00	▼8.60
Total valid votes		6,332	100.00	
Total rejected ballots		189		
Unreturned ballots		19		
Turnout		6,540	81.52	▲1.54
Registered electors		8,023		
Majority		2,660	42.01	▲17.19
BN hold		Swing		

Malacca state election, 1999
Party	Candidate	Votes	%	∆%
BN	Abdul Kadir Daud	4,016	62.41	▼9.67
PAS	Minghat Mamut	2,419	37.59	▲9.67
Total valid votes		6,435	100.00	
Total rejected ballots		274		
Unreturned ballots		4		
Turnout		6,713	79.97	▲0.79
Registered electors		8,394		
Majority		1,597	24.82	▼19.35
BN hold		Swing		

Malacca state election, 1995
Party	Candidate	Votes	%
BN	Sahar Arpan	4,353	72.08
PAS	Minghat Mamut	1,686	27.92
Total valid votes		6,039	100.00
Total rejected ballots		163	
Unreturned ballots		7	
Turnout		6,209	79.19
Registered electors		7,841	
Majority		2,667	44.16
This was a new constituency created.
