= Al-Khawarizmi Astronomy Complex =

Observatory in Alor Gajah, Melaka, Malaysia

Al-Khawarizmi Astronomy Complex Kompleks Falak Al-Khawarizmi
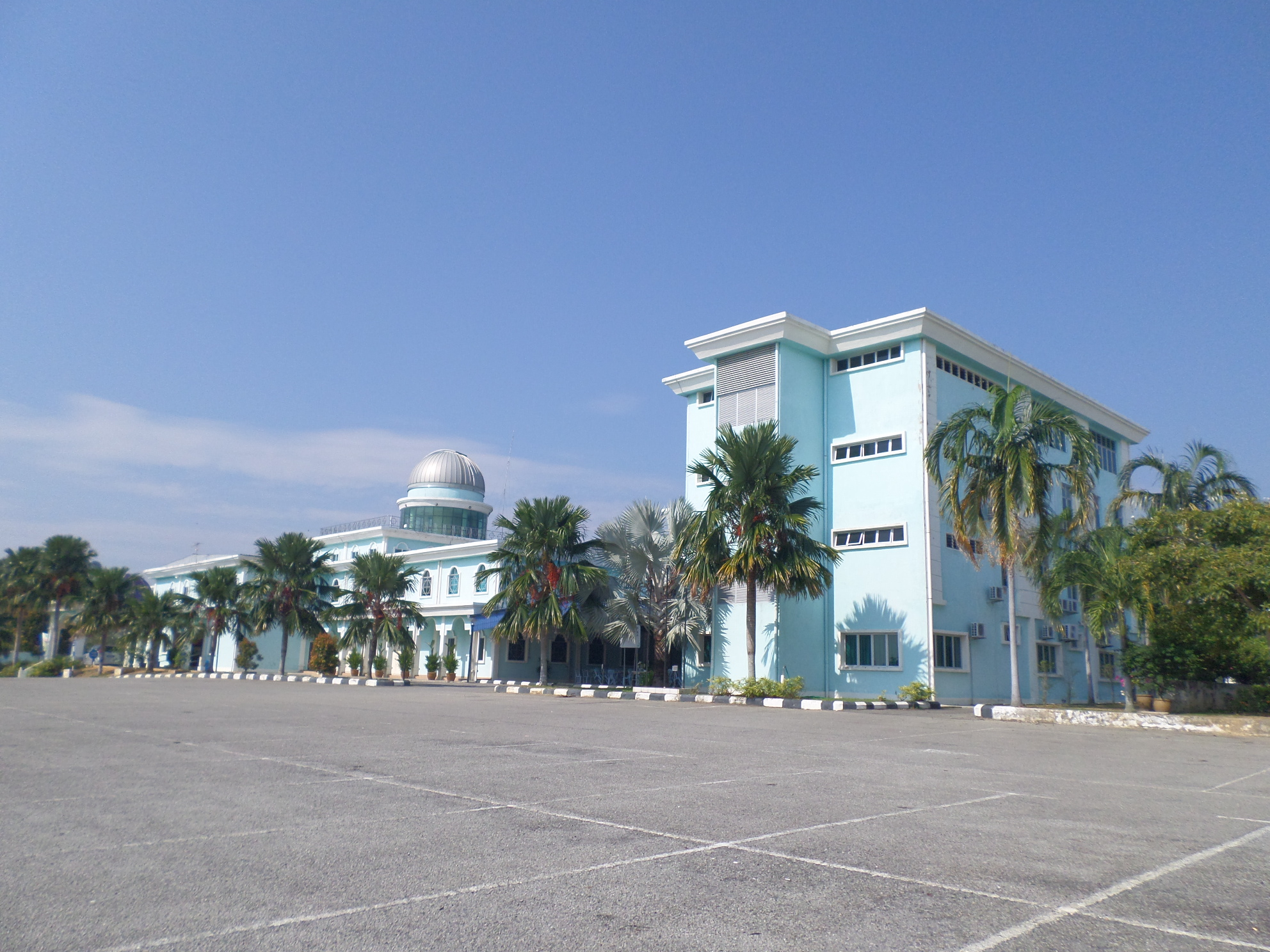
- Named after: Al-Khwarizmi
- Organization: Melaka State Mufti Department
- Location: Masjid Tanah, Alor Gajah, Melaka, Malaysia
- Coordinates: 2°17′40.2″N 102°05′02.2″E
- Established: 2002
- Website: www.khawarizmiobs.com
- Location of Al-Khawarizmi Astronomy Complex; Kompleks Falak Al-Khawarizmi

The Al-Khawarizmi Astronomy Complex (Malay: Kompleks Falak Al-Khawarizmi) is an observatory in Masjid Tanah, Alor Gajah District, Melaka, Malaysia. It is owned by Melaka State Government and operated by Melaka Mufti Department.

== Name ==
The astronomy complex is named after astronomer Muhammad ibn Musa al-Khwarizmi.

== History ==
The astronomy complex was established in different stages. The first stage was the observatory established in 2002, followed by the planetarium in 2005 and finally the training centre in 2008. The total cost for its development was RM20 million.

== Architecture ==
- Observatory
- Planetarium
- Training Centre

== See also ==
- List of tourist attractions in Melaka
