= Masjid Tanah =

- Town

Other transcription(s)
  - Jawi: مسجد تانه
  - Chinese: 马日丹那 (Simplified) 馬日丹那 (Traditional); Mǎrì Dānnà (Hanyu Pinyin)
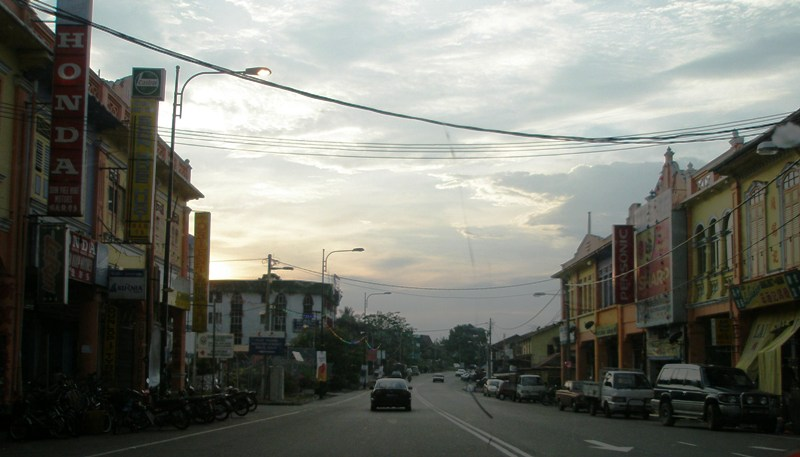
- The town of Masjid Tanah.
- Interactive map of Masjid Tanah
- Coordinates: 2°21′N 102°07′E
- Country: Malaysia
- State: Malacca
- District: Alor Gajah

Government
  - Type: Municipal council
  - Body: Alor Gajah Municipal Council

Population
  - Total: 95,689
- Postal code: 78300

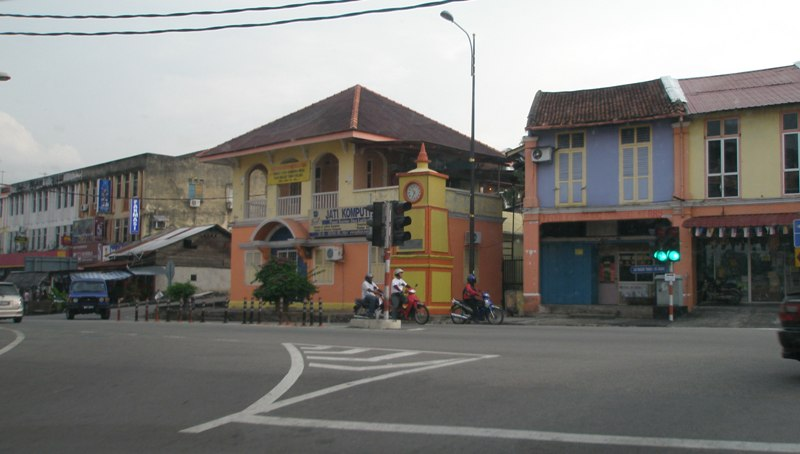
Middle of Masjid Tanah town with its historic clock tower, called the Big Ben. A local team in the 1970s also carried the same name.

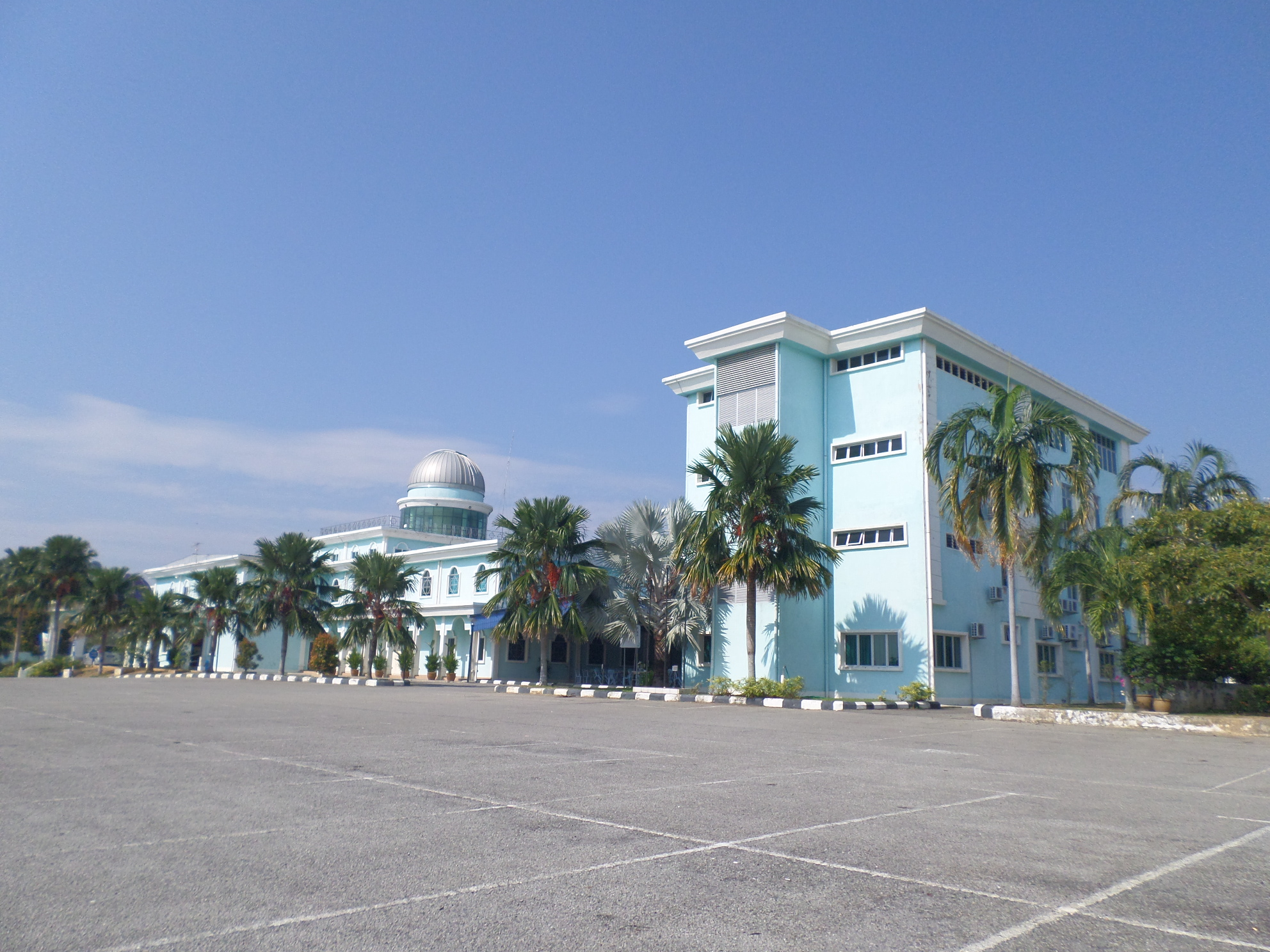
Al-Khawarizmi Astronomy Complex

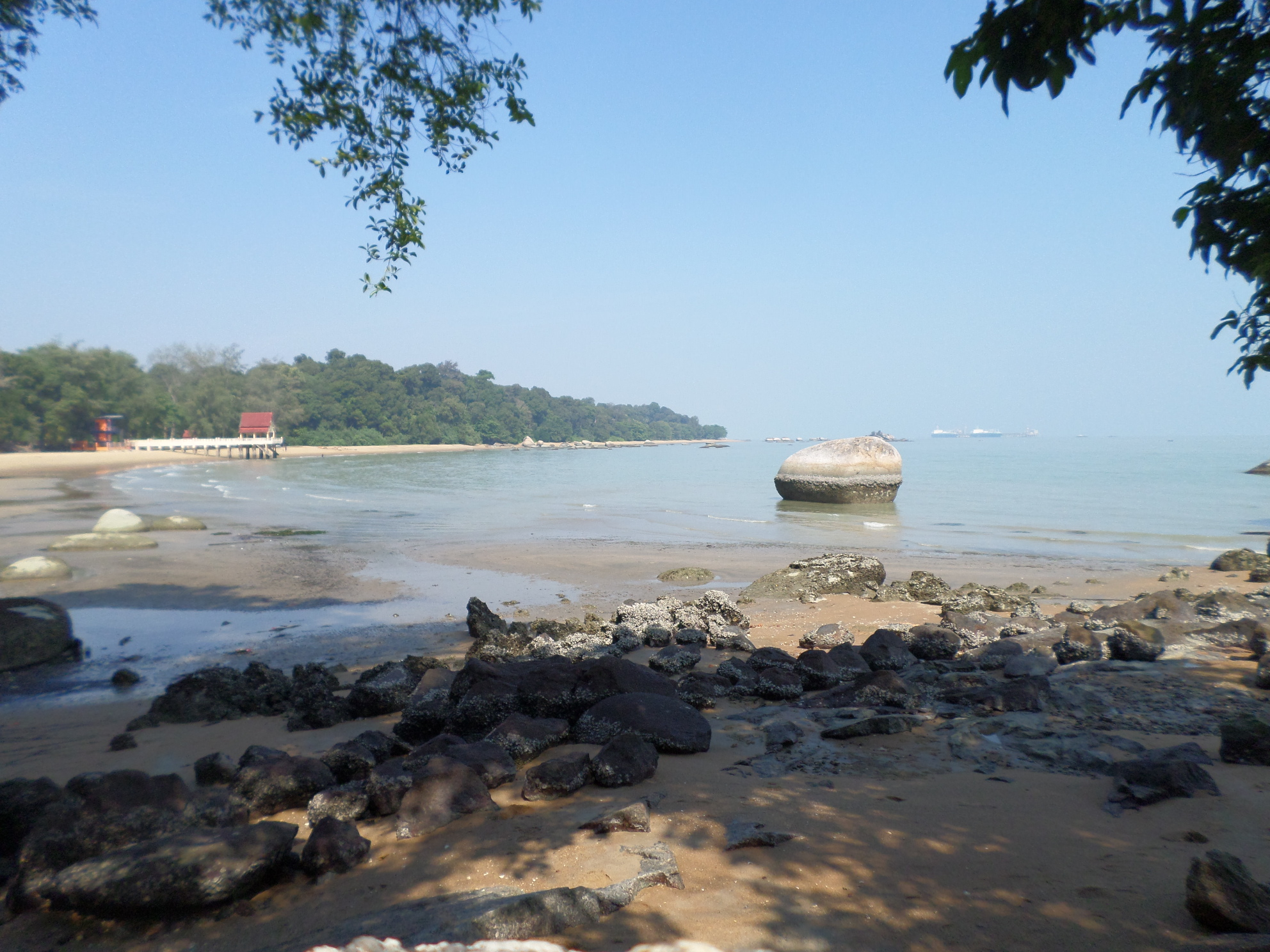
Tanjung Bidara Beach

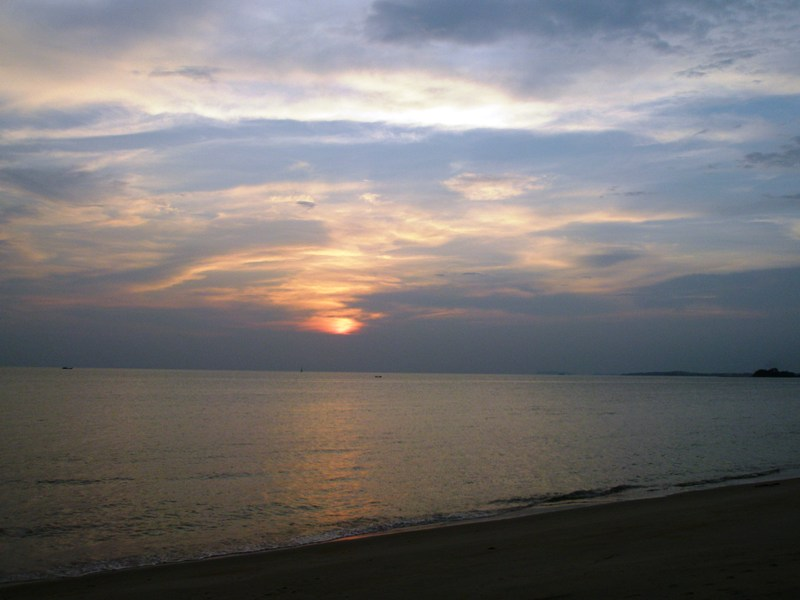
Pengkalan Balak Beach

Masjid Tanah (Jawi: مسجد تانه) is a town and parliamentary constituency in northwestern Malacca, Malaysia, bordering Negeri Sembilan across the Linggi River.

== History ==
According to local oral folklore, Masjid Tanah was first settled by Minangkabau people along with local Malays from Malacca Sultanate Empire in the 14th–15th centuries.

Masjid Tanah once belonged to the state of Naning until the British conquest in 1832 when it was integrated to the Straits Settlement of Malacca.

The name of Masjid Tanah comes from a mosque (masjid) that was built from soil (tanah) by a sheikh from Gujarat around 1800. This mosque was also maintained by a local named Hj. Sulong bin Sibeng. The mosque that was built from soil was demolished later but reconstructed in 1951. This mosque was utilized by several nearby kampungs (villages).

In the late 1990s, there was a real estate boom in Masjid Tanah when the government decided to build a Petronas oil refinery in nearby Sungai Udang. It has many beaches in Pengkalan Balak, 7 km away, and is close to Kuala Sungai Baru.

== Administration ==
Each kampung in the constituency has their own leader (ketua kampung). Most of the kampungs are named after plant species. This tradition of taking the name based on plants is probably influenced by the concept of the name of Melaka itself. Melaka is in fact a name of a tree.

Masjid Tanah is presently administered by Alor Gajah Municipal Council (Majlis Perbandaran Alor Gajah, MPAG). Since 2021, there is a proposal to detach Masjid Tanah as a separate district from Alor Gajah, pending final approval from the Federal Government.

== Demographics ==
Population of Masjid Tanah constituency is 95,689 according to the 2020 census, of which 91% are Malays.

Masjid Tanah, located in the northwestern part of Melaka is very near to Negeri Sembilan. Hence, most of its people are the descendants of Minangkabau people, similar to Negeri Sembilan. They usually carry "Loghat Hulu" (a dialect in Malay language also similar to Negeri Sembilan but slightly different) or Minang accent, and shared the same culture of Adat Perpatih. In some kampung the "culture of working together" or "gotong royong" was still implemented. But most of the culture is now forgotten. The young preferred to work in urban areas and the houses in the kampungs are mostly uninhabited.

== Educational institutions ==
- SMK Ghafar Baba
- SMK Sultan Alauddin
- SMK Hang Kasturi
- Sekolah Menengah Imtiaz Ulul Albab Melaka
- Masjid Tanah Community College (Malay: Kolej Komuniti Masjid Tanah)
- MARA College of High Skills (Malay: Kolej Kemahiran Tinggi MARA)
- National Youth Institute of High Skills (IKTBN; Malay: Institut Kemahiran Tinggi Belia Negara)
- Malacca Matriculation College, (Malay: Kolej Matrikulasi Melaka)
- Poultry Institute of Technology (ITU; Malay: Institut Teknologi Unggas)

== Sports and recreation ==
- Hang Jebat Sailing Centre, Pengkalan Balak

== Tourist attractions ==
- Al-Khawarizmi Astronomy Complex - An observatory owned by the Malacca Islamic Religious Council. The astronomy complex is named after astronomer Muhammad ibn Musa al-Khwarizmi. It was developed in different stages: the first being the observatory established in 2002, followed by the planetarium in 2005 and finally the training centre in 2008. The total cost for its development was RM20 million.
- Tanjung Bidara Beach
- Turtle Conservation and Information Centre
- Pengkalan Balak Beach

== Notable natives ==
Datuk Abu Seman Yusop, the former Malaysian Deputy of Home Minister (2009–2013), comes from this town. He is also the former Member of Parliament for Masjid Tanah.

Since 2013, Mas Ermieyati Samsudin (Perikatan Nasional) is the MP for Masjid Tanah. She is the first female MP in the constituency's history.

== See also ==
- Masjid Tanah (federal constituency)
- List of cities and towns in Malaysia by population
