= Abu Seman Yusop =

Malaysian politician

Yang Berbahagia Tan Sri Datuk Seri Abu Seman Yusop PSM SMW DCSM DMSM KMN

Deputy Minister of Home Affairs I
- In office 10 April 2009 – 15 May 2013 Serving with Jelaing Mersat (2009–2010); Lee Chee Leong (2010–2013) (Deputy Minister of Home Affairs II)
- Monarchs: Mizan Zainal Abidin; Abdul Halim
- Prime Minister: Najib Razak
- Minister: Hishammuddin Hussein
- Preceded by: Wan Ahmad Farid Wan Salleh (Deputy Minister of Home Affairs I)
- Succeeded by: Wan Junaidi Tuanku Jaafar
- Constituency: Masjid Tanah

Deputy Minister of Defence
- In office 19 March 2008 – 9 April 2009
- Monarch: Mizan Zainal Abidin
- Prime Minister: Abdullah Ahmad Badawi
- Minister: Najib Razak (2008–2008); Abdullah Ahmad Badawi (2008–2009)
- Preceded by: Zainal Abidin Zin
- Succeeded by: Abdul Latiff Ahmad
- Constituency: Masjid Tanah

Deputy Minister of Federal Territories
- In office 14 February 2006 – 18 March 2008
- Monarchs: Sirajuddin; Mizan Zainal Abidin
- Prime Minister: Abdullah Ahmad Badawi
- Minister: Mohd Isa Abdul Samad (2004–2005); Shahrizat Abdul Jalil (Acting) (2005–2006); Zulhasnan Rafique (2006–2008)
- Preceded by: Zulhasnan Rafique
- Succeeded by: Saravanan Murugan
- Constituency: Masjid Tanah

Parliamentary Secretary of the Ministry of Internal Security
- In office 2004–2006
- Monarchs: Sirajuddin; Mizan Zainal Abidin
- Prime Minister: Abdullah Ahmad Badawi
- Minister: Abdullah Ahmad Badawi
- Deputy Minister: Noh Omar (Deputy Minister of Internal Security I); Chia Kwang Chye (Deputy Minister of Internal Security II)
- Constituency: Masjid Tanah

Member of the Malaysian Parliament for Masjid Tanah
- In office 21 March 2004 – 5 May 2013
- Preceded by: New constituency
- Succeeded by: Mas Ermieyati Samsudin (BN–UMNO)
- Majority: 18,399 (2004); 12,285 (2008)

Member of the Malaysian Parliament for Alor Gajah
- In office 25 April 1995 – 21 March 2004
- Preceded by: Ibrahim Jendol (BN–UMNO)
- Succeeded by: Fong Chan Onn (BN–MCA)
- Majority: 25,096 (1995); 12,332 (1999)

Faction represented in Dewan Rakyat
- 1995–2013: Barisan Nasional

Personal details
- Born: 10 January 1944 (age 82) Malacca, British Malaya (now Malaysia)
- Party: United Malays National Organisation (UMNO)
- Other political affiliations: Barisan Nasional (BN); Perikatan Nasional (PN); Muafakat Nasional (MN)
- Spouse: Rahimi Yeop
- Children: 2
- Education: Middle Temple
- Occupation: Politician
- Profession: Lawyer

Abu Seman bin Yusop (born 10 January 1944) is a Malaysian politician who was the Member of Parliament of Malaysia for the Masjid Tanah constituency in the state of Melaka from 2004 to 2013. A member of the United Malays National Organisation (UMNO) party in the then-governing Barisan Nasional coalition, he served in the deputy ministry of successive governments during that period.

Before entering politics, Abu Seman was a lawyer with his own firm. He is a former police inspector and prosecutor.

== Political career ==
Abu Seman was elected to federal Parliament in the 2004 general election for the seat of Masjid Tanah. He was subsequently appointed as a Parliamentary Secretary, and in 2009 was appointed as the Deputy Minister of Home Affairs by the newly installed Prime Minister Najib Razak. His ministerial and parliamentary career came to an end in 2013, when he was not selected to recontest his seat for Barisan Nasional.

== Election results ==
Parliament of Malaysia
Year	Constituency	Candidate	Votes	Pct	Opponent(s)	Votes	Pct	Ballot cast	Majority	Turnout
1995	P120 Alor Gajah	Abu Seman Yusop (UMNO)	29,652	86.68%	Omar Baba (PAS)	4,556	13.32%	36,950	25,096	79.70%
1999	P120 Alor Gajah	Abu Seman Yusop (UMNO)	24,615	66.71%	Abdul Ghani Abdul Rahman (PAS)	12,283	33.29%	41,855	12,332	81.58%
2004	P134 Masjid Tanah	Abu Seman Yusop (UMNO)	24,188	80.69%	Muhamad Burok (PAS)	5,789	19.31%	30,807	18,399	78.98%
2008	P134 Masjid Tanah	Abu Seman Yusop (UMNO)	21,582	69.89%	Abdul Ghani Abdul Rahman (PAS)	9,297	30.11%	31,715	12,285	78.10%

== Honours ==
=== Honours of Malaysia ===
- Malaysia
  - Commander of the Order of Loyalty to the Crown of Malaysia (PSM) – Tan Sri (2016)
  - Officer of the Order of the Defender of the Realm (KMN) (1998)
- Federal Territory (Malaysia)
  - Grand Commander of the Order of the Territorial Crown (SMW) – Datuk Seri (2015)
- Malacca
  - Knight Commander of the Exalted Order of Malacca (DCSM) – Datuk Wira (1998)
  - Companion Class I of the Exalted Order of Malacca (DMSM) – Datuk (1994)
