= Attorney General of Malaysia =

Principal legal adviser of Malaysia

- Peguam Negara Malaysia ڤڬوام نڬارا مليسيا
- Incumbent; Mohd Dusuki Mokhtar since 12 November 2024
- Attorney General's Chambers
- Style: The Honourable (Malay: Yang Berbahagia)
- Reports to: Prime Minister
- Seat: Putrajaya
- Appointer: Yang di-Pertuan Agong on the recommendation of the Prime Minister of Malaysia
- Term length: No fixed term
- Constituting instrument: Article 145 of the Federal Constitution
- Formation: 1946
- First holder: Kenneth O'Connor (as Attorney General of the Malayan Union)
- Deputy: Solicitor General of Malaysia; Solicitor General II of Malaysia; Solicitor General III of Malaysia
- Website: agc.gov.my

The Attorney General of Malaysia (Malay: Peguam Negara also referred to as the AG; Jawi: ڤڬوام نڬارا مليسيا) is the principal legal adviser of Malaysia. The Attorney General is also the highest ranking public prosecutor in the country and is also known as the Public Prosecutor, or simply PP. The powers with regard to prosecution is contained in Article 145(3) of the Federal Constitution. For instance, exercisable at his discretion, the Attorney General may institute, conduct or discontinue any proceedings for an offence, other than proceedings before a Syariah court, a native court or a court-martial.

Unlike a number of other Commonwealth common law jurisdictions, the head of the prosecuting authority in Malaysia is simply known as the Public Prosecutor, or PP, instead of the Director of Public Prosecutions, or DPP. In Malaysia, a prosecuting officer is known as a Deputy Public Prosecutor, also known as DPP, and it should not be confused with the previous meaning.

The AG is also the head of the Attorney General's Chambers. There are separate chambers for the state of Sabah and Sarawak which deals with civil law matters affecting the respective state government. Criminal prosecution duties in Sabah and Sarawak are handled by the Malaysian AG. The other states in Peninsular Malaysia do not have separate chambers.

The AG has often been accused of being partial towards the executive or offering too much deference towards the executive. The 8th AG, Tommy Thomas, is the first non-Malay and non-Muslim Attorney General to hold office since the formation of Malaysia in 1963. Pakatan Harapan leader Anwar Ibrahim clarified that his appointment will not adversely affect the status of Islam in the country. Thomas resigned on 28 February 2020.

== Article 145 ==
The A-G's overall powers, roles, and responsibilities are provided for in Article 145 of the Federal Constitution:

1. The Yang di-Pertuan Agong shall, on the advice of the Prime Minister, appoint a person who is qualified to be a judge of the Federal Court to be the Attorney General for the Federation.
2. It shall be the duty of the Attorney General to advise the Yang di-Pertuan Agong or the cabinet or any minister upon such legal matters, and to perform such other duties of a legal character, as may from time to time be referred or assigned to him by the Yang di-Pertuan Agong or the Cabinet, and to discharge the functions conferred on him by or under this Constitution or any other written law.
3. The Attorney General shall have power, exercisable at his discretion, to institute, conduct or discontinue any proceedings for an offence, other than proceedings before a Syariah court, a native court or a court-martial.
  1. Federal law may confer on the Attorney General power to determine the courts in which or the venue at which any proceedings which he has power under Clause (3) to institute shall be instituted or to which such proceedings shall be transferred.
4. In the performance of his duties the Attorney General shall have the right of audience in, and shall take precedence over any other person appearing before, any court or tribunal in the Federation.
5. Subject to Clause (6), the Attorney General shall hold office during the pleasure of the Yang di-Pertuan Agong and may at any time resign his office and, unless he is a member of the Cabinet, shall receive such remuneration as the Yang di-Pertuan Agong may determine.
6. The person holding the office of Attorney General immediately prior to the coming into operation of this Article shall continue to hold the office on terms and conditions not less favourable than those applicable to him immediately before such coming into operation and shall not be removed from office except on the like grounds and in the like manner as a judge of the Federal Court.

== List of attorneys general ==
No.	Attorney General of Malayan Union	Term of office		
No.	Attorney General of Malayan Union	Took office	Left office	Time in office
1.	Kenneth O'Connor	1946	1948	2 years

No.	Attorney General of Federation of Malaya	Term of office		
No.	Attorney General of Federation of Malaya	Took office	Left office	Time in office
-	E. P. S. Bell (Acting)	1948	1948	
1.	Stafford Foster-Sutton	1948	1950	2 years
2.	Michael Joseph Hogan	1950	1955	5 years
3.	Thomas Vernor Alexander Brodie	1955	1959	4 years
4.	Cecil Majella Sheridan	1959	1963	4 years

No.	Attorney General of Malaysia	Term of office		
No.	Attorney General of Malaysia	Took office	Left office	Time in office
1.	Abdul Kadir Yusuf	1963	1977	14 years
2.	Hamzah Abu Samah	1977	1980	3 years
3.	Abu Talib Othman	1980	1993	13 years
4.	Mohtar Abdullah	1994	2000	6 years
5.	Ainum Mohd Saaid	January 2001	December 2001	
6.	Tan Sri Datuk Seri Panglima; Abdul Gani Patail (b.1955)	1 January 2002	27 July 2015	13 years, 207 days
7.	Tan Sri Dato' Sri Haji; Mohamed Apandi Ali (b.1950)	27 July 2015	4 June 2018	2 years, 312 days
–	Engku Nor Faizah Engku Atek (Acting)	2018	2018	
8.	Tan Sri; Tommy Thomas (b.1952)	4 June 2018	28 February 2020	1 year, 269 days
–	Engku Nor Faizah Engku Atek (Acting)	3 March 2020	6 March 2020	3 days
9.	Tan Sri Dato' Sri; Idrus Harun (b.1955)	6 March 2020	6 September 2023	3 years, 185 days
10.	Tan Sri Datuk; Ahmad Terrirudin Mohd Salleh (b.1968)	6 September 2023	11 November 2024	1 year, 67 days
11.	Tan Sri Dato'; Mohd Dusuki Mokhtar (b.1967)	12 November 2024	Incumbent	1 year, 300 days
