= Women in state legislative assemblies of Malaysia =

Women in Malaysia's government

This article is an overview of representation of women in Malaysia's state legislative assemblies.

== Johor ==
There have been 34 women in the Johor State Legislative Assembly since its establishment in 1959. In the 15th Johor State Legislative Assembly, there are 10 women in the 56 member Legislative Assembly.

Women have had the right to vote and the right to stand as candidates since 1959. The first successful female candidate for the Legislative Assembly was Fatimah Abdul Majid, who was elected as the member for Plentong in 1959. Since then there have continuously been female members in the Assembly.

This is an incomplete list of women who have served as members of the Johor State Legislative Assembly, ordered by seniority. This list includes women who served in the past and who continue to serve in the present.

Party	Name	Constituency	Year elected	Year left	Reason
Alliance (UMNO)	Fatimah Abdul Majid	Plentong	1959	1964	Not Contested
Alliance (UMNO)	Hasnah Ahmad	Plentong	1964	1974	Transferred
BN (UMNO)	Hasnah Ahmad	Plentong	1964	1974	Transferred
BN (UMNO)	Hasnah Ahmad	Tiram	1974	1978	Transferred
BN (UMNO)	Hasnah Ahmad	Kota Tinggi	1978	1982	Not Contested
Alliance (UMNO)	Zaharah Abdul Majid	Parit Jawa	1969	1974	Transferred
BN (UMNO)	Zaharah Abdul Majid	Parit Jawa	1969	1974	Transferred
BN (UMNO)	Zaharah Abdul Majid	Sri Menanti	1974	1982	Not Contested
BN (UMNO)	Sabariah Ahmad	Kesang	1982	1986	Transferred
BN (UMNO)	Sabariah Ahmad	Jorak	1986	1999	Not Contested
BN (UMNO)	Khatijah Md Som	Pulai Sebatang	1986	1990	Transferred
BN (UMNO)	Khatijah Md Som	Benut	1990	1995	Transferred
BN (UMNO)	Khatijah Md Som	Pulai Sebatang	1995	1999	Not Contested
BN (UMNO)	Atikah Abdullah	Sri Medan	1990	1999	Not Contested
BN (UMNO)	Halimah Mohamed Sadique	Gunung Lambak	1995	2004	Transferred
BN (UMNO)	Halimah Mohamed Sadique	Pasir Raja	2004	2008	Not Contested
BN (UMNO)	Jamilah Othman	Bukit Naning	1999	2004	Not Contested
BN (UMNO)	Asiah Md Ariff	Sedili	1999	2004	Transferred
BN (UMNO)	Asiah Md Ariff	Johor Lama	2004	2018	Not Contested
BN (UMNO)	Jamaliah @ Jamilah Endan	Kukup	1999	2008	Not Contested
BN (MCA)	Lim Kee Moi	Yong Peng	2004	2013	Defeated
BN (UMNO)	Robia Kosai	Sungai Balang	2004	2013	Not Contested
BN (MIC)	Murukasvary Thanarajan	Tenggaroh	2008	2013	Not Contested
BN (UMNO)	Hamimah Mansor	Penawar	2008	2018	Not Contested
BN (UMNO)	Norshida Ibrahim	Buloh Kasap	2013	2018	Not Contested
BN (UMNO)	Zaiton Ismail	Sungai Balang	2013	2022	Not Contested
BN (UMNO)	Azizah Zakaria	Parit Raja	2013	2018	Not Contested
DAP	Chew Peck Choo	Yong Peng	2013	2022	Retired
PH (DAP)	Chew Peck Choo	Yong Peng	2013	2022	Retired
DAP	Gan Peck Cheng	Penggaram	2013	2026	Retired
PH (DAP)	Gan Peck Cheng	Penggaram	2013	2026	Retired
DAP	Liow Cai Tung	Johor Jaya	2013	2026	Not Contested
PH (DAP)	Liow Cai Tung	Johor Jaya	2013	2026	Not Contested
DAP	Wong Shu Qi	Senai	2013	2018	Not Contested
PH (AMANAH)	Nor Hayati Bachok	Maharani	2018	2022	Defeated
BN (UMNO)	Nor Rashidah Ramli	Parit Raja	2018		Serving
BN (UMNO)	Alwiyah Talib	Endau	2018		Serving
PH (BERSATU)	Alwiyah Talib	Endau	2018		Serving
PN (BERSATU)	Alwiyah Talib	Endau	2018		Serving
BN (UMNO)	Alwiyah Talib	Endau	2018		Serving
BN (UMNO)	Rashidah Ismail	Pasir Raja	2018	2026	Not Contested
BN (UMNO)	Sharifah Azizah Syed Zain	Penawar	2018	2022	Transferred
BN (UMNO)	Sharifah Azizah Syed Zain	Mahkota	2022	2024	Death
PH (DAP)	Ng Kor Sim	Jementah	2022	2026	Defeated
BN (MIC)	Saraswathy Nallathamby	Kemelah	2022	2026	Not Contested
BN (UMNO)	Haslinda Salleh	Tenang	2022	2026	Not Contested
BN (UMNO)	Khairin Nisa Ismail	Serom	2022	2026	Not Contested
BN (UMNO)	Norlizah Noh	Johor Lama	2022		Serving
BN (UMNO)	Fauziah Misri	Penawar	2022		Serving
MUDA	Amira Aisya Abdul Aziz	Puteri Wangsa	2022	2026	Not Contested
PH (DAP)	Marina Ibrahim	Skudai	2022	2026	Retired
BN (UMNO)	Hasrunizah Hassan	Pulai Sebatang	2022		Serving
BN (UMNO)	Nadhirah Afiqah Abdul Rahim	Serom	2026		Serving
PH (DAP)	Felicia Poh Rui Ling	Penggaram	2026		Serving
PH (DAP)	Chu Poh Yee	Mengkibol	2026		Serving
BN (MCA)	Chan San San	Johor Jaya	2026		Serving
PH (DAP)	Kartiyaini Jeyapalan	Skudai	2026		Serving

=== Proportion ===
Assembly	Number of women members	Percentage of women members	Total members (including men)
1st	1	3.13%	32
2nd	1	3.13%	32
3rd	2	6.25%	32
4th	2	6.25%	32
5th	2	6.25%	32
6th	1	3.13%	32
7th	2	5.56%	36
8th	3	8.33%	36
9th	4	10.00%	40
10th	4	10.00%	40
11th	5	8.93%	56
12th	5	8.93%	56
13th	9	16.07%	56
14th	9	16.07%	56
15th	15	26.79%	56
15th (after 2024)	14	25.00%	56
16th	10	17.86%	56

== Kedah ==
There have been 18 women in the Kedah State Legislative Assembly since its establishment in 1959. In the 15th Kedah State Legislative Assembly, there are 4 women in the 36 member Legislative Assembly.

Women have had the right to vote and the right to stand as candidates since 1959. The first successful female candidate for the Legislative Assembly was Hamidah Omar, who was elected as the member for Sik-Gurun in 1959. Since then there have continuously been female members in the Assembly.

This is an incomplete list of women who have served as members of the Kedah State Legislative Assembly, ordered by seniority. This list includes women who served in the past and who continue to serve in the present.

Party	Name	Constituency	Year elected	Year left	Reason
Alliance (UMNO)	Hamidah Omar	Sik-Gurun	1959	1964	Transferred
Alliance (UMNO)	Hamidah Omar	Pokok Sena	1964	1969	Defeated
Alliance (UMNO)	Sharimah Mahmud	Sik-Gurun	1964	1969	Not Contested
BN (UMNO)	Azizah Taib	Kuala Nerang	1978	1986	Not Contested
BN (UMNO)	Fatimah Ismail	Ayer Puteh	1986	1995	Transferred
BN (UMNO)	Fatimah Ismail	Sungai Tiang	1995	1999	Not Contested
BN (UMNO)	Rokiah Hashim	Tanjong Dawai	1986	1995	Not Contested
BN (UMNO)	Barishah @ Habshah Saad	Tunjang	1995	2004	Not Contested
BN (UMNO)	Che Pora Omar	Merbau Pulas	1995	1999	Not Contested
BN (UMNO)	Marlia Abd. Latiff	Merbau Pulas	1999	2004	Not Contested
BN (UMNO)	Rosnah Abd. Majid	Tanjong Dawai	1999	2004	Not Contested
BN (UMNO)	Khalidah Adibah Ayob	Bukit Kayu Hitam	2004	2008	Not Contested
BN (UMNO)	Suraya Yaacob	Sungai Tiang	2004	2023	Not Contested
PAS	Siti Aishah Ghazali	Merbau Pulas	2008		Serving
PN (PAS)	Siti Aishah Ghazali	Merbau Pulas	2008		Serving
BN (UMNO)	Kama Noriah Ibrahim	Pedu	2013	2018	Defeated
BN (UMNO)	Norsabrina Mohd. Noor	Bandar Baharu	2013	2023	Not Contested
PH (AMANAH)	Salmee Said	Kota Siputeh	2018	2023	Defeated
PH (BERSATU)	Halimaton Shaadiah Saad	Bukit Kayu Hitam	2018		Serving
PN (BERSATU)	Halimaton Shaadiah Saad	Bukit Kayu Hitam	2018		Serving
PN (BERSATU)	Shamsilah Siru	Ayer Hangat	2023		Serving
PN (PAS)	Mardhiyyah Johari	Pengkalan Kundor	2023		Serving

=== Proportion ===
Assembly	Number of women members	Percentage of women members	Total members (including men)
1st	1	4.17%	24
2nd	2	8.33%	24
3rd	0	0.00%	24
4th	0	0.00%	26
5th	1	3.85%	26
6th	1	3.85%	26
7th	2	7.14%	28
8th	2	7.14%	28
9th	3	8.33%	36
10th	3	8.33%	36
11th	2	5.56%	36
12th	2	5.56%	36
13th	4	11.11%	36
14th	5	13.89%	36
15th	4	11.11%	36

== Kelantan ==
There have been 9 women in the Kelantan State Legislative Assembly since its establishment in 1959. In the 15th Kelantan State Legislative Assembly, there are 3 women in the 45 member Legislative Assembly.

Women have had the right to vote and the right to stand as candidates since 1959. The first successful female candidate for the Legislative Assembly was Tengku Noor Asiah Tengku Ahmad, who was elected as the member for Sungei Pinang in 1982. Since then there have continuously been female members in the Assembly.

This is an incomplete list of women who have served as members of the Kelantan State Legislative Assembly, ordered by seniority. This list includes women who served in the past and who continue to serve in the present.

Party	Name	Constituency	Year elected	Year left	Reason
BN (UMNO)	Tengku Noor Asiah Tengku Ahmad	Sungei Pinang	1982	1986	Not Contested
BN (UMNO)	Zaleha Hussin	Salor	1986	1990	Defeated
S46	Kelthum Ahmed	Temangan	1990	1995	Not Contested
S46	Mek Som Mohamed	Mengkebang	1995	1999	Not Contested
PAS	Rohani Ibrahim	Tanjong Mas	2004		Serving
PN (PAS)	Rohani Ibrahim	Tanjong Mas	2004		Serving
PAS	Wan Ubaidah Omar	Kijang	2008	2018	Not Contested
PAS	Mumtaz Md. Nawi	Demit	2013	2023	Not Contested
PN (PAS)	Mumtaz Md. Nawi	Demit	2013	2023	Not Contested
PH (AMANAH)	Hafidzah Mustakim	Kota Lama	2023		Serving
PN (PAS)	Nor Ashilah Mohamed Zin	Limbongan	2023		Serving

=== Proportion ===
Assembly	Number of women members	Percentage of women members	Total members (including men)
1st	0	0.00%	30
2nd	0	0.00%	30
3rd	0	0.00%	30
4th	0	0.00%	36
5th	0	0.00%	36
6th	1	2.78%	36
7th	1	2.56%	39
8th	1	2.56%	39
9th	1	2.33%	43
10th	0	0.00%	43
11th	1	2.22%	45
12th	2	4.44%	45
13th	3	6.67%	45
14th	2	4.44%	45
15th	3	6.67%	45

== Malacca ==
There have been 13 women in the Malacca State Legislative Assembly since its establishment in 1959. In the 15th Malacca State Legislative Assembly, there are 5 women in the 28 member Legislative Assembly.

Women have had the right to vote and the right to stand as candidates since 1959. The first successful female candidate for the Legislative Assembly was Fatimah Ahmad, who was elected as the member for Bukit Rambai in 1974. Since then there have continuously been female members in the Assembly.

This is an incomplete list of women who have served as members of the Malacca State Legislative Assembly, ordered by seniority. This list includes women who served in the past and who continue to serve in the present.

Party	Name	Constituency	Year elected	Year left	Reason
BN (UMNO)	Fatimah Ahmad	Bukit Rambai	1974	1986	Not Contested
BN (UMNO)	Jenah Sarip	Bukit Asahan	1986	1995	Not Contested
BN (UMNO)	Hazizah Mohd Sultan	Tangga Batu	1995	1999	Not Contested
DAP	Betty Chew Gek Cheng	Durian Daun	1999	2004	Transferred
DAP	Betty Chew Gek Cheng	Kota Laksamana	2004	2013	Not Contested
BN (UMNO)	Ramlah Abas	Rim	1999	2008	Not Contested
BN (UMNO)	Latipah Omar	Taboh Naning	2008	2021	Not Contested
BN (UMNO)	Norpipah Abdol	Rembia	2008	2018	Defeated
PH (PKR)	Ginie Lim Siew Lin	Machap Jaya	2018	2021	Not Contested
BN (UMNO)	Kalsom Noordin	Pengkalan Batu	2021	2026	Not Contested
BN (UMNO)	Khaidiriah Abu Zahar	Rim	2021		Serving
BN (UMNO)	Siti Faizah Abdul Azis	Sungai Rambai	2021	2026	Not Contested
PH (DAP)	Leng Chau Yen	Bandar Hilir	2021		Serving
BN (UMNO)	Tuminah Kadi @ Mohd Hasim	Pantai Kundor	2021		Serving
BN (UMNO)	Siti Aisyah Mahmood	Pengkalan Batu	2026		Serving

=== Proportion ===
Assembly	Number of women members	Percentage of women members	Total members (including men)
1st	0	0.00%	20
2nd	0	0.00%	20
3rd	0	0.00%	20
4th	1	5.00%	20
5th	1	5.00%	20
6th	1	5.00%	20
7th	1	5.00%	20
8th	1	5.00%	20
9th	1	4.00%	25
10th	2	8.00%	25
11th	2	7.14%	28
12th	3	10.71%	28
13th	2	7.14%	28
14th	2	7.14%	28
15th	5	17.86%	28
16th	4	14.29%	28

== Negeri Sembilan ==
There have been 18 women in the Negeri Sembilan State Legislative Assembly since its establishment in 1959. In the 14th Negeri Sembilan State Legislative Assembly, there are 3 women in the 36 member Legislative Assembly.

Women have had the right to vote and the right to stand as candidates since 1959. The first successful female candidate for the Legislative Assembly was Siti Rahmah Kassim, who was elected as the member for Terentang in 1959. Since then there have continuously been female members in the Assembly.

This is an incomplete list of women who have served as members of the Negeri Sembilan State Legislative Assembly, ordered by seniority. This list includes women who served in the past and who continue to serve in the present.

Party	Name	Constituency	Year elected	Year left	Reason
Alliance (UMNO)	Siti Rahmah Kassim	Terentang	1959	1969	Not Contested
Alliance (UMNO)	Sapiah Talib	Johol	1964	1974	Not Contested
BN (UMNO)	Sapiah Talib	Johol	1964	1974	Not Contested
BN (UMNO)	Khatimah Ibrahim	Pantai	1974	1986	Transferred
BN (UMNO)	Khatimah Ibrahim	Ampangan	1986	1990	Not Contested
BN (UMNO)	Tengku Kalsom Tengku Muda Chik	Pilah	1974	1982	Not Contested
BN (UMNO)	Dermataksiah Abdul Jalil	Ampangan	1990	1999	Not Contested
BN (UMNO)	Napsiah Omar	Pilah	1995	1999	Not Contested
BN (MCA)	Yu Chok Tow	Mambau	1999	2008	Not Contested
BN (UMNO)	Norhayati Omar	Pilah	1999	2008	Not Contested
BN (UMNO)	Bibi Sharliza Mohd Khalid	Paroi	2004	2008	Not Contested
BN (UMNO)	Bibi Sharliza Mohd Khalid	Juasseh	2023	2026	Not Contested
DAP	Wong May May	Mambau	2008	2013	Not Contested
BN (UMNO)	Zainab Nasir	Gemas	2008	2013	Not Contested
BN (UMNO)	Norhayati Omar	Pilah	2013	2018	Defeated
DAP	Mary Josephine Pritam Singh	Rahang	2013	2023	Not Contested
PH (DAP)	Mary Josephine Pritam Singh	Rahang	2013	2023	Not Contested
PH (DAP)	Nicole Tan Lee Koon	Bukit Kepayang	2018		Serving
PH (PKR)	Tengku Zamrah Tengku Sulaiman	Ampangan	2023	2026	Not Contested
PH (PKR)	Noorzunita Begum Abdullah	Pilah	2023	2026	Defeated
BN (UMNO)	S Leza Md Yasin	Pilah	2026		Serving
BN (UMNO)	Siti Nur Umaira Hasim	Labu	2026		Serving

=== Proportion ===
Assembly	Number of women members	Percentage of women members	Total members (including men)
1st	1	4.17%	24
2nd	2	8.33%	24
3rd	1	4.17%	24
4th	2	8.33%	24
5th	2	8.33%	24
6th	1	4.17%	24
7th	1	3.57%	28
8th	1	3.57%	28
9th	2	6.25%	32
10th	2	6.25%	32
11th	3	8.33%	36
12th	2	5.56%	36
13th	2	5.56%	36
14th	2	5.56%	36
15th	4	11.11%	36
16th	3	8.33%	36

== Pahang ==
There have been 16 women in the Pahang State Legislative Assembly since its establishment in 1959. In the 14th Pahang State Legislative Assembly, there are 2 women in the 42 member Legislative Assembly.

Women have had the right to vote and the right to stand as candidates since 1959. The first successful female candidate for the Legislative Assembly was Mahimon Harun, who was elected as the member for Telok Sisek in 1959. Since then there have continuously been female members in the Assembly.

This is an incomplete list of women who have served as members of the Pahang State Legislative Assembly, ordered by seniority. This list includes women who served in the past and who continue to serve in the present.

Party	Name	Constituency	Year elected	Year left	Reason
Alliance (UMNO)	Mahimon Harun	Telok Sisek	1959	1974	Not Contested
BN (UMNO)	Mahimon Harun	Telok Sisek	1959	1974	Not Contested
BN (UMNO)	Sariah Kamiso	Jengka	1974	1982	Not Contested
BN (UMNO)	Shamsiah Abdul Hamid	Bandar Pekan	1974	1982	Not Contested
BN (UMNO)	Kamariah Mat Noh	Tembeling	1982	1990	Not Contested
BN (UMNO)	Latifah Abdul Ghaffar	Beserah	1982	1986	Not Contested
BN (UMNO)	Rahimah Mohammad Rawi	Tembeling	1990	1995	Not Contested
BN (UMNO)	Rahimah Mohammad Rawi	Tahan	1995	1999	Not Contested
BN (UMNO)	Maznah Mazlan	Muadzam Shah	1995	2018	Not Contested
BN (UMNO)	Rosni Zahari	Hulu Jempol	1999	2004	Transferred
BN (UMNO)	Rosni Zahari	Kuala Sentul	2004	2008	Not Contested
DAP	Leong Mee Meng	Tras	2004	2008	Transferred
BN (UMNO)	Shahaniza Shamsuddin	Kuala Sentul	2008	2022	Not Contested
BN (UMNO)	Nurhidayah Mohamad Shahaimi	Luit	2013	2018	Defeated
DAP	Kamache Doray Rajoo	Sabai	2013	2022	Defeated
PH (DAP)	Kamache Doray Rajoo	Sabai	2013	2022	Defeated
DAP	Leong Yu Man	Triang	2013		Serving
PH (DAP)	Leong Yu Man	Triang	2013		Serving
BN (UMNO)	Samsiah Arshad	Bukit Ibam	2018	2022	Defeated
PH (DAP)	Young Syefura Othman	Ketari	2018	2022	Not Contested
BN (UMNO)	Sabariah Saidan	Guai	2022		Serving

=== Proportion ===
Assembly	Number of women members	Percentage of women members	Total members (including men)
1st	1	4.17%	24
2nd	1	4.17%	24
3rd	1	4.17%	24
4th	2	6.25%	32
5th	2	6.25%	32
6th	2	6.25%	32
7th	1	3.03%	33
8th	1	3.03%	33
9th	2	5.26%	38
10th	2	5.26%	38
11th	3	7.14%	42
12th	2	4.76%	42
13th	5	11.90%	42
14th	5	11.90%	42
15th	2	4.76%	42

== Penang ==
There have been 18 women in the Penang State Legislative Assembly since its establishment in 1959. In the 14th Penang State Legislative Assembly, there are 5 women in the 40 member Legislative Assembly.

Women have had the right to vote and the right to stand as candidates since 1959. The first successful female candidates for the Legislative Assembly were Ragayah Ariff and Kee Phaik Cheen, who were elected as the member for Sungai Acheh and Batu Uban respectively in 1986. Since then there have continuously been female members in the Assembly.

This is an incomplete list of women who have served as members of the Penang State Legislative Assembly, ordered by seniority. This list includes women who served in the past and who continue to serve in the present.

Party	Name	Constituency	Year elected	Year left	Reason
BN (UMNO)	Ragayah Ariff	Sungai Acheh	1986	1990	Not Contested
BN (Gerakan)	Kee Phaik Cheen	Batu Uban	1986	2004	Not Contested
BN (UMNO)	Rokiah Bee Hassan	Telok Ayer Tawar	1990	1995	Not Contested
BN (UMNO)	Jahara Hamid	Telok Ayer Tawar	1995	2018	Not Contested
DAP	Chong Eng	Batu Lancang	1995	1999	Defeated
BN (MCA)	Tan Cheng Liang	Jawi	1995	2008	Defeated
BN (Gerakan)	Ng Siew Lai	Bukit Tengah	1999	2008	Defeated
BN (UMNO)	Siti Faridah Arshad	Telok Bahang	2004	2008	Not Contested
BN (UMNO)	Zabariah Abdul Wahab	Bertam	2008	2013	Not Contested
DAP	Ong Kok Fooi	Berapit	2008	2018	Not Contested
PKR	Norlela Ariffin	Penanti	2013	2023	Not Contested
PH (PKR)	Norlela Ariffin	Penanti	2013	2023	Not Contested
DAP	Chong Eng	Padang Lalang	2013	2023	Not Contested
PH (DAP)	Chong Eng	Padang Lalang	2013	2023	Not Contested
DAP	Yap Soo Huey	Pulau Tikus	2013	2018	Not Contested
DAP	Lim Siew Khim	Sungai Pinang	2013		Serving
PH (DAP)	Lim Siew Khim	Sungai Pinang	2013		Serving
BN (UMNO)	Nor Hafizah Othman	Permatang Berangan	2018	2023	Defeated
PH (DAP)	Heng Lee Lee	Berapit	2018		Serving
PH (DAP)	Syerleena Abdul Rashid	Seri Delima	2018	2023	Not Contested
PH (DAP)	Phee Syn Tze	Sungai Puyu	2023		Serving
PH (DAP)	Connie Tan Hooi Peng	Seri Delima	2018		Serving

=== Proportion ===
Assembly	Number of women members	Percentage of women members	Total members (including men)
1st	0	0.00%	24
2nd	0	0.00%	24
3rd	0	0.00%	24
4th	0	0.00%	27
5th	0	0.00%	27
6th	0	0.00%	27
7th	2	6.06%	33
8th	2	6.06%	33
9th	4	12.12%	33
10th	4	12.12%	33
11th	4	10.00%	40
12th	3	7.50%	40
13th	6	15.00%	40
14th	6	15.00%	40
15th	4	10.00%	40

== Perak ==
There have been 31 women in the Perak State Legislative Assembly since its establishment in 1959. In the 15th Perak State Legislative Assembly, there are 12 women in the 59 member Legislative Assembly.

Women have had the right to vote and the right to stand as candidates since 1959. The first successful female candidates for the Legislative Assembly were Halimah Abdul Raof and Som Abdullah, who were elected as the member for Parit Buntar and Batak Rabit respectively in 1959. Since then there have continuously been female members in the Assembly.

This is an incomplete list of women who have served as members of the Perak State Legislative Assembly, ordered by seniority. This list includes women who served in the past and who continue to serve in the present.

Party	Name	Constituency	Year elected	Year left	Reason
Alliance (UMNO)	Halimah Abdul Raof	Parit Buntar	1959	1974	Not Contested
BN (UMNO)	Halimah Abdul Raof	Parit Buntar	1959	1974	Not Contested
Alliance (UMNO)	Som Abdullah	Batak Rabit	1959	1969	Not Contested
BN (UMNO)	Munah Lebai Rafar	Chenderiang	1974	1978	Not Contested
BN (UMNO)	Mahwany @ Radziah Marahuddin	Hutan Melintang	1974	1990	Not Contested
BN (UMNO)	Rokiah Kayat	Bota	1978	1986	Not Contested
BN (MCA)	Wu Lian Hwa	Kuala Pari	1982	1986	Not Contested
BN (UMNO)	Zainab Ibrahim	Belanja	1986	1995	Not Contested
DAP	Lok Swee Chin	Falim	1986	1995	Not Contested
BN (UMNO)	Mazidah Zakaria	Sungai Rokam	1990	1995	Transferred
BN (UMNO)	Mazidah Zakaria	Hulu Kinta	1995	2008	Not Contested
BN (UMNO)	Khamsiyah Yeop	Kenering	1995	1999	Not Contested
BN (UMNO)	Ainon Khariyah Mohd Abas	Kampong Gajah	1999	2004	Not Contested
BN (UMNO)	Siti Salmah Mat Jusak	Chenderoh	2004	2013	Transferred
BN (UMNO)	Siti Salmah Mat Jusak	Lubok Merbau	2013	2018	Not Contested
DAP	Hee Yit Foong	Jelapang	2004	2013	Not Contested
BN (UMNO)	Hamidah Osman	Sungai Rapat	2004	2013	Defeated
DAP	Leong Mee Meng	Jalong	2008	2013	Not Contested
BN (UMNO)	Rusnah Kassim	Hulu Kinta	2008	2013	Transferred
BN (UMNO)	Rusnah Kassim	Behrang	2013	2018	Defeated
DAP	Lim Pek Har	Menglembu	2008	2018	Not Contested
BN (UMNO)	Nolee Ashilin Mohammed Radzi	Tualang Sekah	2008	2022	Not Contested
PN (BERSATU)	Nolee Ashilin Mohammed Radzi	Tualang Sekah	2008	2022	Not Contested
BN (UMNO)	Wan Norashikin Wan Noordin	Kampong Gajah	2008	2013	Not Contested
BN (UMNO)	Salbiah Mohamed	Temengor	2013		Serving
PKR	Chua Yee Ling	Kuala Sapetang	2013	2018	Defeated
DAP	Wong May Ing	Pantai Remis	2013		Serving
PH (DAP)	Wong May Ing	Pantai Remis	2013		Serving
BN (UMNO)	Jamilah Zakaria	Trong	2018	2022	Defeated
PH (DAP)	Jenny Choy Tsi Jen	Canning	2018		Serving
BN (UMNO)	Wan Norashikin Wan Noordin	Kampong Gajah	2018	2022	Defeated
PH (PKR)	Sandrea Ng Shy Ching	Teja	2018		Serving
PH (DAP)	Thulsi Thivani Manogaran	Buntong	2022		Serving
PN (PAS)	Najihatussalehah Ahmad	Bota	2022		Serving
PH (DAP)	Bavani Veraiah @ Shasha	Malim Nawar	2022		Serving
PH (DAP)	Angeline Koo Hai Yen	Keranji	2022		Serving
PH (PKR)	Wong Chai Yi	Simpang Pulai	2022		Serving
PN (BERSATU)	Norhaslinda Zakaria	Pangkor	2022		Serving
PH (PKR)	Wasanthee Sinnasamy	Hutan Melintang	2022		Serving
BN (UMNO)	Salina Samsudin	Behrang	2022		Serving

=== Proportion ===
Assembly	Number of women members	Percentage of women members	Total members (including men)
1st	2	5.00%	40
2nd	2	5.00%	40
3rd	1	2.50%	40
4th	2	4.76%	42
5th	2	4.76%	42
6th	3	7.14%	42
7th	3	6.52%	46
8th	3	6.52%	46
9th	2	3.85%	52
10th	2	3.85%	52
11th	4	6.78%	59
12th	8	13.56%	59
13th	7	11.86%	59
14th	7	11.86%	59
15th	12	20.34%	59

== Perlis ==
There have been 11 women in the Perlis State Legislative Assembly since its establishment in 1959. In the 15th Perlis State Legislative Assembly, there are 2 women in the 15 member Legislative Assembly.

Women have had the right to vote and the right to stand as candidates since 1959. The first successful female candidate for the Legislative Assembly was Ramlah @ Che Ah Long, who was elected as the member for Kayang in 1990. Since then there have continuously been female members in the Assembly.

This is an incomplete list of women who have served as members of the Perlis State Legislative Assembly, ordered by seniority. This list includes women who served in the past and who continue to serve in the present.

Party	Name	Constituency	Year elected	Year left	Reason
BN (UMNO)	Ramlah @ Che Ah Long	Kayang	1990	1999	Not Contested
BN (UMNO)	Ramlah @ Che Ah Long	Simpang Empat	1990	1999	Not Contested
BN (UMNO)	Sopiah Ahmad	Bintong	1995	1999	Not Contested
BN (UMNO)	Azihani Ali	Sena	1999	2008	Not Contested
BN (MCA)	Oui Ah Lan @ Ng Ah Lan	Indera Kayangan	2002	2008	Not Contested
BN (UMNO)	Asmaiza Ahmad	Chuping	2013	2022	Defeated
BN (UMNO)	Rela Ahmad	Bintong	2013	2018	Not Contested
BN (UMNO)	Siti Berenee Yahaya	Mata Ayer	2018	2022	Defeated
PH (PKR)	Gan Ay Ling	Indera Kayangan	2018		Serving
BN (UMNO)	Rozieana Ahmad	Pauh	2018	2022	Defeated
PN (PAS)	Wan Badariyah Wan Saad	Mata Ayer	2022	2026	Death
PN (BERSATU)	Marzita Mansor	Sena	2022		Serving

=== Proportion ===
Assembly	Number of women members	Percentage of women members	Total members (including men)
1st	0	0.00%	12
2nd	0	0.00%	12
3rd	0	0.00%	12
4th	0	0.00%	12
5th	0	0.00%	12
6th	0	0.00%	12
7th	0	0.00%	14
8th	1	7.14%	14
9th	2	13.33%	15
10th	1	6.67%	15
10th (after 2002)	2	13.33%	15
11th	2	13.33%	15
12th	0	0.00%	15
13th	2	13.33%	15
14th	4	26.67%	15
15th	3	20.00%	15
15th (after 2026)	2	13.33%	15

== Sarawak ==
There have been 15 women in the Sarawak State Legislative Assembly since its establishment in 1867. In the 19th Sarawak State Legislative Assembly, there are 5 women in the 82 member Legislative Assembly.

Women have had the right to vote and the right to stand as candidates since 1969. The first successful female candidate for the Legislative Assembly was Ajibah Abol, who was elected as the member for Semariang in 1971. Since then there have continuously been female members in the Assembly.

This is an incomplete list of women who have served as members of the Sarawak State Legislative Assembly, ordered by seniority. This list includes women who served in the past and who continue to serve in the present.

Party	Name	Constituency	Year elected	Year left	Reason
Alliance (BUMIPUTERA)	Ajibah Abol	Semariang	1971	1976	Died
BN (PBB)	Ajibah Abol	Semariang	1971	1976	Died
BN (PBB)	Hafsah Harun	Semariang	1976	1979	Transferred
BN (PBB)	Hafsah Harun	Petra Jaya	1979	1987	Not Contested
BN (PBB)	Sharifah Mordiah Tuanku Fauzi	Sebandi	1979	1981	Resigned
BN (PBB)	Sharifah Mordiah Tuanku Fauzi	Petra Jaya	1987	1991	Transferred
BN (PBB)	Sharifah Mordiah Tuanku Fauzi	Pantai Damai	1991	2001	Transferred
BN (PBB)	Sharifah Mordiah Tuanku Fauzi	Samariang	2001	2006	Not Contested
BN (PBB)	Dona Babel	Samariang	1996	2001	Not Contested
BN (SUPP)	Lily Yong Lee Lee	Padungan	2001	2006	Defeated
BN (PBB)	Fatimah Abdullah	Dalat	2001		Serving
GPS (PBB)	Fatimah Abdullah	Dalat	2001		Serving
BN (PBB)	Sharifah Hasidah Sayeed Aman Ghazali	Samariang	2006		Serving
GPS (PBB)	Sharifah Hasidah Sayeed Aman Ghazali	Samariang	2006		Serving
DAP	Violet Yong Wui Wui	Pending	2006		Serving
PH (DAP)	Violet Yong Wui Wui	Pending	2006		Serving
BN (PBB)	Simoi Peri	Lingga	2006	2021	
GPS (PBB)	Simoi Peri	Lingga	2006	2021	
DAP	Ting Tze Fui	Meradong	2006	2016	Defeated
BN (PBB)	Rosey Yunus	Bekenu	2006		Serving
GPS (PBB)	Rosey Yunus	Bekenu	2006		Serving
DAP	Christina Chiew Wang See	Batu Kawah	2011	2016	Defeated
DAP	Irene Mary Chang Oi Ling	Bukit Assek	2016	2021	Defeated
PH (DAP)	Irene Mary Chang Oi Ling	Bukit Assek	2016	2021	Defeated
BN (PBB)	Jamilah Anu	Tanjong Datu	2017	2021	
GPS (PBB)	Jamilah Anu	Tanjong Datu	2017	2021	
GPS (PBB)	Dayang Noorazah Awang Sohor	Lingga	2021		Serving

=== Proportion ===
Assembly	Number of women members	Percentage of women members	Total members (including men)
8th	1	2.08%	48
9th	2	4.17%	48
10th	2	4.17%	48
11th	1	2.08%	48
12th	1	2.08%	48
13th	1	1.79%	56
14th	2	3.23%	62
15th	3	4.84%	62
16th	6	8.45%	71
17th	7	9.86%	71
18th	6	7.32%	82
18th (after 2017)	7	8.54%	82
19th	5	6.10%	82

== Sabah ==
There have been 23 women in the Sabah State Legislative Assembly since its establishment in 1963. In the 15th Sabah State Legislative Assembly, there are 5 women in the 60 member Legislative Assembly.

Women have had the right to vote and the right to stand as candidates since 1967. The first successful female candidate for the Legislative Assembly was Rahimah Stephens, who was elected as the member for Kiulu in 1976. Since then there have continuously been female members in the Assembly.

This is an incomplete list of women who have served as members of the Sabah State Legislative Assembly, ordered by seniority. This list includes women who served in the past and who continue to serve in the present.

Party	Name	Constituency	Year elected	Year left	Reason
BERJAYA	Rahimah Stephens	Kiulu	1976	1985	Not Contested
BERJAYA	Kolnah Sahih	Kuala Kinabatangan	1981	1985	Not Contested
USNO	Azizah Mohd Dun	Klias	1985	1986	Not Contested
USNO	Dayang Mahani Pengiran Ahmad Raffae	Lumadan	1985	1999	Not Contested
BN (UMNO)	Dayang Mahani Pengiran Ahmad Raffae	Lumadan	1985	1999	Not Contested
PBS	Ariah Tengku Ahmad	Kawang	1986	1994	Defeated
PBS	Jamilah Sulaiman	Sipitang	1990	1994	Defeated
BN (UMNO)	Sarinum Sadikun	Lumadan	1999	2008	Not Contested
BN (PBS)	Jornah Mozihim	Matunggong	2004	2013	Not Contested
BN (UMNO)	Jainab Ahmad	Karambunai	2004	2018	Defeated
BN (SAPP)	Melanie Chia Chui Ket	Luyang	2004	2013	Not Contested
BN (PBS)	Lasiah Baranting @ Anita	Tandek	2008	2020	Defeated
BN (UMNO)	Azizah Mohd Dun	Klias	2008	2013	Not Contested
BN (UMNO)	Hamisah Samad	Tanjong Batu	2008	2020	Not Contested
PBS	Julita Mojungki	Matunggong	2018		Serving
GRS (PBS)	Julita Mojungki	Matunggong	2018		Serving
PH (PKR)	Christina Liew Chin Jin	Api-Api	2018	2025	Not Contested
DAP	Janie Lasimbang	Kapayan	2018	2025	Defeated
PH (DAP)	Janie Lasimbang	Kapayan	2018	2025	Defeated
WARISAN	Jenifer Lasimbang	Moyog	2018	2020	Not Contested
WARISAN	Manis Muka Mohd Darah	Bugaya	2018	2020	Death
WARISAN	Norazlinah Arif	Kunak	2018	2025	Defeated
GRS (GAGASAN)	Norazlinah Arif	Kunak	2018	2025	Defeated
PN (STAR)	Flovia Ng	Tulid	2020	2025	Not Contested
GRS (STAR)	Flovia Ng	Tulid	2020	2025	Not Contested
WARISAN	Rina Jainal	Kukusan	2020		Serving
GRS (PHRS)	Rina Jainal	Kukusan	2020		Serving
Independent	Rina Jainal	Kukusan	2020		Serving
WARISAN	Isnaraissah Munirah Majilis	Usukan	2025		Serving
WARISAN	Edna Jessica Majimbun	Inanam	2025		Serving
WARISAN	Nurulalsah Hassan Alban	Sungai Sibuga	2025		Serving

=== Proportion ===
Assembly	Number of women members	Percentage of women members	Total members (including men)
3rd	0	0.00%	32
4th	0	0.00%	32
5th	1	2.08%	48
6th	1	2.08%	48
7th	2	4.17%	48
8th	2	4.17%	48
9th	3	6.25%	48
10th	1	2.08%	48
11th	1	2.08%	48
12th	4	6.67%	60
13th	6	10.00%	60
14th	3	5.00%	60
15th	8	13.33%	60
16th	7	9.58%	73
16th (after 2022)	6	8.22%	73
17th	5	6.85%	73

== Selangor ==
There have been 41 women in the Selangor State Legislative Assembly since its establishment in 1959. In the 15th Selangor State Legislative Assembly, there are 5 women in the 56 member Legislative Assembly.

Women have had the right to vote and the right to stand as candidates since 1959. The first successful female candidates for the Legislative Assembly were Ganga Nayar and Salmah Mohd Salleh, who were elected as the member for Serendah and Semenyih respectively in 1971. Since then there have continuously been female members in the Assembly.

This is an incomplete list of women who have served as members of the Selangor State Legislative Assembly, ordered by seniority. This list includes women who served in the past and who continue to serve in the present.

Party	Name	Constituency	Year elected	Year left	Reason
Gerakan	Ganga Nayar	Serendah	1971	1974	Not Contested
Alliance (UMNO)	Salmah Mohd. Salleh	Semenyih	1971	1978	Not Contested
BN (UMNO)	Salmah Mohd. Salleh	Semenyih	1971	1978	Not Contested
BN (UMNO)	Norsiah Abdul Rahim	Jeram	1974	1982	Not Contested
BN (UMNO)	Zaleha Ismail	Permatang	1978	1982	Not Contested
BN (UMNO)	Fatimah Suhaimi	Banting	1982	1995	Not Contested
BN (UMNO)	Rakibah Abdul Manap	Hulu Kelang	1986	1990	Not Contested
DAP	Oon Hong Geok	Taman Aman	1986	1995	Transferred
DAP	Oon Hong Geok	Damansara Utama	1995	1999	Not Contested
BN (UMNO)	Mesrah Selamat	Jeram	1995	2004	Not Contested
BN (UMNO)	Rakibah Abdul Manap	Gombak Setia	1995	1999	Not Contested
BN (UMNO)	Norkhaila Jamaluddin	Taman Medan	1999	2004	Not Contested
BN (MIC)	Kamala Ganapathy	Kota Raja	1999	2004	Transferred
BN (MIC)	Kamala Ganapathy	Seri Andalas	2004	2008	Defeated
BN (MCA)	Low Lee Leng	Kajang	2004	2008	Defeated
BN (UMNO)	Seripah Noli Syed Hussin	Seri Setia	2004	2008	Defeated
BN (Gerakan)	Yong Dai Ying	Bukit Lanjan	2004	2008	Defeated
BN (UMNO)	Norliza Ahmad	Selat Klang	2004	2008	Defeated
PKR	Gan Pei Nei	Rawang	2008	2018	Not Contested
DAP	Lee Ying Ha	Teratai	2008	2013	Defeated
DAP	Teresa Kok Suh Sim	Kinrara	2008	2013	Not Contested
DAP	Hannah Yeoh Tseow Suan	Subang Jaya	2008	2018	Not Contested
PKR	Haniza Mohamed Talha	Taman Medan	2008	2018	Transferred
PH (PKR)	Haniza Mohamed Talha	Lembah Jaya	2018	2021	Not Contested
PBM	Haniza Mohamed Talha	Lembah Jaya	2018	2021	Not Contested
PKR	Elizabeth Wong Keat Ping	Bukit Lanjan	2008	2023	Not Contested
PH (PKR)	Elizabeth Wong Keat Ping	Bukit Lanjan	2008	2023	Not Contested
PKR	Rodziah Ismail	Batu Tiga	2008	2023	Not Contested
PH (PKR)	Rodziah Ismail	Batu Tiga	2008	2023	Not Contested
PAS	Halimah Ali	Selat Klang	2008	2018	Defeated
BN (UMNO)	Rosni Sohar	Hulu Bernam	2013	2023	Not Contested
DAP	Lee Kee Hiong	Kuala Kubu Baharu	2013	2024	Death
PH (DAP)	Lee Kee Hiong	Kuala Kubu Baharu	2013	2024	Death
DAP	Tiew Way Keng	Teratai	2013	2018	Not Contested
PAS	Noor Hanim Ismail	Seri Serdang	2013	2018	Defeated
DAP	Yeo Bee Yin	Damansara Utama	2013	2018	Not Contested
BN (UMNO)	Halimaton Saadiah Bohan	Kota Damansara	2013	2018	Defeated
PKR	Daroyah Alwi	Sementa	2013	2023	Not Contested
PH (PKR)	Daroyah Alwi	Sementa	2013	2023	Not Contested
PBM	Daroyah Alwi	Sementa	2013	2023	Not Contested
DAP	Lai Nyuk Lan	Sungai Pelek	2013	2018	Not Contested
PKR	Wan Azizah Wan Ismail	Kajang	2014	2018	Not Contested
PH (PKR)	Rozana Zainal Abidin	Permatang	2018	2023	Not Contested
PH (PKR)	Juwairiya Zulkifli	Bukit Melawati	2018	2023	Defeated
PH (AMANAH)	Siti Mariah Mahmud	Seri Serdang	2018	2023	Not Contested
PH (DAP)	Michelle Ng Mei Sze	Subang Jaya	2018		Serving
PH (DAP)	Lim Yi Wei	Kampung Tunku	2018		Serving
PH (DAP)	Jamaliah Jamaluddin	Bandar Utama	2018		Serving
PH (DAP)	Wong Siew Ki	Balakong	2018	2023	Transferred
PH (DAP)	Wong Siew Ki	Seri Kembangan	2023		Serving
PN (BERSATU)	Nurul Syazwani Noh	Permatang	2023		Serving
PH (AMANAH)	Anfal Saari	Taman Templer	2023		Serving
PH (PKR)	Pua Pei Ling	Bukit Lanjan	2023		Serving
PH (AMANAH)	Mariam Abdul Rashid	Meru	2023		Serving
PH (DAP)	Pang Sock Tao	Kuala Kubu Baharu	2024		Serving

=== Proportion ===
Assembly	Number of women members	Percentage of women members	Total members (including men)
1st	0	0.00%	28
2nd	0	0.00%	28
3rd	2	7.14%	28
4th	2	6.06%	33
5th	2	6.06%	33
6th	1	3.03%	33
7th	3	7.14%	42
8th	2	4.76%	42
9th	3	6.25%	48
10th	3	6.25%	48
11th	5	8.93%	56
12th	8	14.29%	56
13th	14	25.00%	56
13th (after 2014)	15	26.79%	56
14th	12	21.43%	56
14th (after 2018)	13	23.21%	56
15th	9	16.07%	56

== Terengganu ==
There has been 2 women in the Terengganu State Legislative Assembly since its establishment in 1959. In the 15th Terengganu State Legislative Assembly, there is a woman in the 32 member Legislative Assembly after 49 years.

Women have had the right to vote and the right to stand as candidates since 1959. The first successful female candidate for the Legislative Assembly was Teh Hassan, who was elected as the member for Chukai in 1971.

This is an incomplete list of women who have served as members of the Terengganu State Legislative Assembly, ordered by seniority. This list includes women who served in the past and who continue to serve in the present.

Party	Name	Constituency	Year elected	Year left	Reason
Alliance (UMNO)	Teh Hassan	Chukai	1971	1974	Not Contested
BN (UMNO)	Teh Hassan	Chukai	1971	1974	Not Contested
PN (PAS)	Zuraida Mohd Noor	Ladang	2023		Serving

=== Proportion ===
Assembly	Number of women members	Percentage of women members	Total members (including men)
1st	0	0.00%	24
2nd	0	0.00%	24
3rd	1	4.17%	24
4th	0	0.00%	28
5th	0	0.00%	28
6th	0	0.00%	28
7th	0	0.00%	32
8th	0	0.00%	32
9th	0	0.00%	32
10th	0	0.00%	32
11th	0	0.00%	32
12th	0	0.00%	32
13th	0	0.00%	32
14th	0	0.00%	32
15th	1	3.13%	32
