= State legislative assemblies of Malaysia =

Subnational legislatures

Peninsular Malaysia's State Legislative Assembly (DUN) constituencies (marked in blue border) for 2018-2023 session.

In Malaysia, a state legislative assembly, officially Dewan Undangan Negeri (DUN), is the legislative branch of the state governments in each of the 13 Malaysian states. Members of a state legislative assembly comprises elected representatives from single-member constituencies during state elections through the first-past-the-post voting system.

The assemblies have powers to enact state laws as provided for by the Constitution of Malaysia. The majority party in each assembly forms the state government, and the leader of the majority party becomes Menteri Besar (for states with hereditary rulers) or Chief Minister (for states without hereditary rulers) of the state.

The state legislative assemblies are unicameral, unlike the bicameral Parliament of Malaysia. The hereditary rulers or Yang di-Pertua Negeri (governors) are vested with powers to dissolve their respective state legislative assemblies on the advice of the menteri besar or chief minister. Once dissolved, elections must be carried out within an interim period of sixty (60) days.

== List of state legislative assemblies in Malaysia ==
The list excludes Kuala Lumpur, Putrajaya and Labuan as Federal Territories do not have state legislative assemblies and are governed directly by the federal government under the Ministry of Federal Territories together with local authorities, namely the Kuala Lumpur City Hall, Putrajaya Corporation and Labuan Corporation respectively.

Peninsular Malaysia

State constituencies in Peninsular Malaysia, by party affiliation. (As of February 2026)

Government-led state (7)	Opposition-led state (4)
BN-led government (4); PH-led government (3)	PN (4)

State (and Assembly)	Seats (2018)	Population (2020)	Population/seat	Governing party / coalition	Government Leader	Speaker	Opposition party / coalition	Opposition Leader
Johor (16th)	56	4,009,670	71,601	BN	Onn Hafiz Ghazi	Zahari Sarip	PH	Andrew Chen Kah Eng
Kedah (15th)	36	2,131,427	59,206	PN + BERSATU	Muhammad Sanusi Md Nor	Zubir Ahmad	PH	Bau Wong Bau Ek
Kelantan (15th)	45	1,792,501	39,833	PN + BERSATU	Mohd Nassuruddin Daud	Mohd Amar Abdullah	BN + PH	Mohd Syahbuddin Hashim
Malacca (15th)	28	1,000,003	35,658	BN + PN	Ab Rauf Yusoh	Ibrahim Durum	PH	TBA
Negeri Sembilan (16th)	36	1,199,974	33,333	BN + PN	Ismail Lasim	Awaludin Said	PH	Arul Kumar Jambunathan
Pahang (15th)	42	1,591,295	37,888	BN + PH + BERSATU	Wan Rosdy Wan Ismail	Mohd Sharkar Shamsudin	PN	Tuan Ibrahim Tuan Man
Penang (15th)	40	1,740,405	43,510	PH + BN	Chow Kon Yeow	Law Choo Kiang	PN & BERSATU	Muhammad Fauzi Yusoff
Perak (15th)	59	2,496,041	42,306	PH + BN	Saarani Mohamad	Mohamad Zahir Abdul Khalid	PN & BERSATU	Razman Zakaria
Perlis (15th)	15	284,885	18,992	BERSATU + PN	Abu Bakar Hamzah	Rus'sele Eizan	PH	Gan Ay Ling
Selangor (15th)	56	6,994,423	124,900	PH + BN	Amirudin Shari	Lau Weng San	BERSATU & PN	Mohamed Azmin Ali
Terengganu (15th)	32	1,149,440	35,920	PN	Ahmad Samsuri Mokhtar	Mohd Nor Hamzah	N/A	

Sabah & Sarawak

State constituencies in Sabah and Sarawak, by party affiliation. (As of January 2026)

Government-led state (2)
- GRS-led government (1)
- GPS-led government (1)

State (and Assembly)	Seats (2018)	Population (2020)	Population/seat	Governing party / coalition	Government Leader	Speaker	Opposition party / coalition	Opposition Leader
Sabah (17th)	73	3,418,785	46,833	GRS + PH + BN + STAR + PN	Hajiji Noor	Kadzim M. Yahya	WARISAN & KDM	Mohd Shafie Apdal
Sarawak (19th)	82	2,453,677	29,923	GPS	Abang Abdul Rahman Zohari Abang Openg	Mohamad Asfia Awang Nassar	PH	Chong Chieng Jen

== Lists of State Assembly Representatives in Malaysia ==
- List of Malayan State and Settlement Council Representatives (1954–1959)
- List of Malaysian State Assembly Representatives (1959–1964)
- List of Malaysian State Assembly Representatives (1964–1969)
- List of Malaysian State Assembly Representatives (1969–1974)
- List of Malaysian State Assembly Representatives (1974–1978)
- List of Malaysian State Assembly Representatives (1978–1982)
- List of Malaysian State Assembly Representatives (1982–1986)
- List of Malaysian State Assembly Representatives (1986–1990)
- List of Malaysian State Assembly Representatives (1990–1995)
- List of Malaysian State Assembly Representatives (1995–1999)
- List of Malaysian State Assembly Representatives (1999–2004)
- List of Malaysian State Assembly Representatives (2004–2008)
- List of Malaysian State Assembly Representatives (2008–2013)
- List of Malaysian State Assembly Representatives (2013–2018)
- List of Malaysian State Assembly Representatives (2018–2023)
- List of Malaysian State Assembly Representatives (2023–present)

== Women ==
- Women in state legislative assemblies of Malaysia

== See also ==
- Politics of Malaysia
- List of state by-elections in Malaysia
