= List of Malaysian State Assembly Representatives (1974–1978) =

Subnational legislature representatives

List of Malaysian State Assembly Representatives (1969–1974)
List of Malaysian State Assembly Representatives (1974–1978)
List of Malaysian State Assembly Representatives (1978–1982)

The following are the members of the Dewan Undangan Negeri or state assemblies, elected in the 1974 state election and by-elections. Also included is the list of the Sabah state assembly members who were elected in 1976.

== Perlis ==
No.	State Constituency	Member	Party
BN 12
N01	Titi Tinggi	Leong Choon Ling	BN (MCA)
N02	Chuping	Ahmad Said	BN (UMNO)
N03	Bintong	Jaafar Hassan	BN (UMNO)
N04	Bandar Kangar	Tan Thean Choo	BN (MCA)
N05	Paya	Mahmud Hashim	BN (UMNO)
N06	Oran	Abdullah Hassan	BN (UMNO)
N07	Kuala Perlis	Mohamed Noor Yub	BN (UMNO)
N08	Kayang	Hazim Abu Bakar	BN (UMNO)
N09	Utan Aji	Syed Darus Syed Hashim	BN (UMNO)
N10	Bandar Arau	Hussain Abdul Rahman	BN (PAS)
N11	Kurong Anai	Wan Ahmad Wan Abdullah	BN (UMNO)
N12	Sanglang	Ahmad Long	BN (PAS)

== Kedah ==
No.	State Constituency	Member	Party
BN 24 | DAP 1 | IND 1
N01	Langkawi	Fadzil Ahmad	BN (UMNO)
N02	Jerlun	Mahmud Abdul Jalil	BN (UMNO)
N03	Tunjang	Ismail Hanafi	BN (PAS)
N04	Jitra	Osman @ Mohd Daud Aroff	BN (UMNO)
N05	Kuala Nerang	Syed Ahmad Syed Mahmud Shahabudin	BN (UMNO)
N06	Pokok Sena	Osman Mohd Marzuki	BN (PAS)
N07	Anak Bukit	Wahab Sulaiman	BN (PAS)
N08	Pengkalan Kundor	Ahmad Awang	BN (PAS)
N09	Alor Merah	Mohd. Abu Bakar Rautin Ibrahim	BN (UMNO)
N10	Bandar Alor Setar	Karpal Singh	DAP
N11	Langgar-Limbong	Sudin Wahab	BN (PAS)
N12	Bukit Raya	Ismail @ Shafie Kassim	BN (PAS)
N13	Sik	Harun Jusoh	BN (PAS)
N14	Pendang	Safirol Hashim	BN (UMNO)
N15	Bayu	Mat Rasit @ Abdul Rashid Hashim	IND
N16	Kupang	Mohd Ramli Abdullah	BN (PAS)
N17	Sala	Yahaya Junid	BN (PAS)
N18	Yan	Abdullah Ismail	BN (UMNO)
N19	Jeniang	Zainol Abidin Johari	BN (UMNO)
N20	Merbok	Hashim Osman from 15 April 1975	BN (UMNO)
N20	Merbok	Mansor Akil until 1975	BN (UMNO)
N21	Tikam Batu	Ong Boon Seong (王绍雄)	BN (Gerakan)
N22	Kuala Ketil	Mohamed Muslim Othman	BN (UMNO)
N23	Lunas	Lim Wan Ming from 13 June 1976	BN (MCA)
N23	Lunas	Soon Cheng Leong until 1976	BN (MCA)
N24	Merbau Pulas	Mustapha Kassim	BN (UMNO)
N25	Kulim	Leong Man Kai	BN (MCA)
N26	Serdang	Ismail Dahalan	BN (UMNO)

== Kelantan ==
No.	State Constituency	Member	Party
BN 36
N01	Simpangan	Hussein Abdullah	BN (PAS)
N02	Sungei Pinang	Che Lat Kassim	BN (UMNO)
N03	Wakaf Bharu	Omar Awang Kechik	BN (UMNO)
N04	Semut Api	Wan Mamat Wan Yusoff	BN (PAS)
N05	Kemumin	Abdullah Ahmad	BN (PAS)
N06	Sering	Nik Abdullah Arshad	BN (PAS)
N07	Tendong	Mohamed Nasir	BN (PAS)
N08	Meranti	Nik Man Nik Mohamed	BN (PAS)
N09	Bandar Pasir Mas	Hashim Omar	BN (PAS)
N10	Sungei Keladi	Foo Chow Yong @ Foo Hong Sang	BN (MCA)
N11	Telipot	Hassan Yaacob	BN (PAS)
N12	Kubang Kerian	Salahuddin Abdullah	BN (PAS)
N13	Tawang	Mohamed Nor Yusoff	BN (PAS)
N14	Perupok	Mustapha Othman	BN (PAS)
N15	Jelawat	Mohamed Yaacob	BN (UMNO)
N16	Gual Periok	Hussein Ahmad	BN (UMNO)
N17	Lemal	Haron Sulong	BN (PAS)
N18	Tok Uban	Musa Mohamed	BN (PAS)
N19	Salor	Abdul Rahman Awang Sulong	BN (PAS)
N20	Ketereh	Ishak Lotfi Omar	BN (PAS)
N21	Peringat	Mohamed Amin @ Abdul Hamid Salleh	BN (PAS)
N22	Bukit Panau	Omar Muhamed @ Mamat	BN (PAS)
N23	Lanas	Abdul Samad Drahman	BN (UMNO)
N24	Gual Ipoh	Mustafa Yaakub	BN (UMNO)
N25	Pulai Chondong	Abdullah Mohamed	BN (UMNO)
N26	Bandar Machang	Ibrahim Mohamed	BN (UMNO)
N27	Sungei Rasau	Wan Ismail Wan Ibrahim	BN (PAS)
N28	Bandar Pasir Puteh	Raja Mahmud Raja Mamat	BN (UMNO)
N29	Cherang Ruku	Wan Omar Wan Majid	BN (UMNO)
N30	Selising	Abdul Kadir Mat Sa'ad	BN (PAS)
N31	Temangan	Nik Hussain Abdul Rahman	BN (PAS)
N32	Guchil	Muhammad Awang	BN (PAS)
N33	Pahi	Abdul Aziz Talib	BN (UMNO)
N34	Jeli	Nik Mohamed Mustaffa Shafie	BN (PAS)
N35	Gua Musang	Abdul Ghani Abu Bakar	BN (UMNO)
N36	Manek Urai	Hussein Sulaiman	BN (UMNO)

== Trengganu ==
No.	State Constituency	Member	Party
BN 27 | IND 1
N01	Kuala Besut	Hussin Jusoh	BN (PAS)
N02	Kampong Raja	Abu Bakar Ahmad	BN (UMNO)
N03	Bukit Kenak	Abdullah Jusoh	BN (UMNO)
N04	Ulu Besut	Hussein Abdullah	BN (UMNO)
N05	Setiu	Tengku Mahmud Mansur	BN (UMNO)
N06	Langkap	Salleh Mohamed	BN (UMNO)
N07	Batu Rakit	Abdullah Abdul Rahman	BN (UMNO)
N08	Seberang Takir	Abdul Rashid Ngah	BN (UMNO)
N09	Telemung	Ahmad Sidi Ismail	BN (UMNO)
N10	Binjai	Abdul Rahman Ali	BN (UMNO)
N11	Tanggol	Salleh Ismail	BN (UMNO)
N12	Kuala Brang	Abdul Rashid Su	BN (PAS)
N13	Jeram	Awang Abu Bakar	BN (PAS)
N14	Bukit Tunggal	Abdul Rahman Awang	BN (UMNO)
N15	Manir	Ismail Yusof	BN (UMNO)
N16	Bukit Payong	Mukhtar Mohamed	BN (PAS)
N17	Bandar	Toh Seng Chong	BN (MCA)
N18	Ladang	Abu Bakar Daud	BN (UMNO)
N19	Wakaf Mempelam	Mohamed @ Harun Jusoh	BN (PAS)
N20	Batu Burok	Abdul Muttalib Salleh	IND
N21	Marang	Kasim Ahmad	BN (PAS)
N22	Merchang	Mohamed Adib Omar	BN (UMNO)
N23	Sura	Omar Shukri Embong	BN (PAS)
N24	Jerangau	Che Muda Yusoff	BN (PAS)
N25	Paka	Ismail Haitami Salleh	BN (UMNO)
N26	Kemasek	Wan Adnan Wan Ismail	BN (UMNO)
N27	Bukit Bandi	Wan Yahya Wan Mohd.	BN (PAS)
N28	Chukai	Wan Mokhtar Ahmad	BN (UMNO)

== Penang ==
No.	State Constituency	Member	Party
BN 23 | DAP 2 | Pekemas 1 | IND 1
N01	Penaga	Hassan Mohd. Noh	BN (UMNO)
N02	Bertam	Abdul Rahman Abbas from 16 June 1977	BN (UMNO)
N02	Bertam	Ahmad Abdullah until 7 May 1977	BN (UMNO)
N03	Tasek Gelugor	Mohamed Noor Ahmad	BN (UMNO)
N04	Bagan Ajam	Ibrahim Abdul Razak	BN (UMNO)
N05	Bagan Jermal	Ong Yi How	Pekemas
N06	Bagan Dalam	T. Subbiah	BN (MIC)
N07	Sungai Dua	Zabidi Ali	BN (PAS)
N08	Kubang Semang	Mohamad Noor Bakar	BN (UMNO)
N09	Penanti	Abdullah Mohamad @ Mahmud	BN (UMNO)
N10	Bukit Tengah	Harun Sirat	BN (Gerakan)
N11	Pekan Bukit Mertajam	Oh Teck Aun	DAP
N12	Machang Bubok	Lim Heng Tee	BN (Gerakan)
N13	Bukit Tambun	Ng Swee Ching	DAP
N14	Sungai Bakap	S. P. Chelliah	BN (Gerakan)
N15	Sungai Acheh	Ahmad Salleh	BN (UMNO)
N16	Telok Bahang	Yahaya Mohd. Yusoff	BN (UMNO)
N17	Sungai Nibong	Choong Sim Poey	BN (Gerakan)
N18	Bayan Lepas	Khalid Ahmad Suleiman	BN (UMNO)
N19	Tanjong Bunga	Khoo Gark Kim	BN (Gerakan)
N20	Ayer Itam	David Choong Ewe Leong	BN (MCA)
N21	Paya Terubong	Khoo Teng Chye	BN (Gerakan)
N22	Padang Kota	Lim Chong Eu	BN (Gerakan)
N23	Kampong Kolam	Khoo Kay Por	BN (Gerakan)
N24	Pengkalan Kota	Chooi Yew Choy	IND
N25	Datok Keramat	Teh Ewe Lim	BN (Gerakan)
N26	Sungai Pinang	Wong Choong Woh	BN (Gerakan)
N27	Bukit Gelugor	Tan Ghim Hwa	BN (Gerakan)

== Perak ==
No.	State Constituency	Member	Party
BN 31 | DAP 11
N01	Temengor	Wan Mohamed Wan Teh	BN (UMNO)
N02	Kenering	Tajol Rosli Mohd Ghazali from 19 November 1977	BN (UMNO)
N02	Kenering	Mohamed Ghazali Jawi until 1 October 1977	BN (UMNO)
N03	Selama	Abdul Aziz Ahmad	BN (UMNO)
N04	Batu Kurau	Tajudin Ali	BN (UMNO)
N05	Simpang Lima	Ismail Abdul Rauf	BN (UMNO)
N06	Kuala Kurau	Zakaria J. Ali	BN (UMNO)
N07	Alor Pongsu	Mohamed Abbas from 18 December 1974	BN (UMNO)
N07	Alor Pongsu	Masud Untoi until 5 November 1974	BN (UMNO)
N08	Gunong Semanggol	Baharuddin Abdul Latif	BN (PAS)
N09	Lintang	Mohamed Bashir Mohamed Bahari	BN (UMNO)
N10	Jalong	Ngan Siong Hing @ Ngan Siong Eng	DAP
N11	Kamunting	Cheong Kim Foong	BN (MCA)
N12	Klian Pauh	Lim Eng Chuan	DAP
N13	Changkat Jering	Ang Chin Wah	BN (Gerakan)
N14	Bukit Gantang	Ahmad Mansor	BN (UMNO)
N15	Lenggong	Saidin Mat Piah	BN (UMNO)
N16	Lubok Merbau	Mohamed Junid	BN (PAS)
N17	Bukit Chandan	Ahmad Zainal	BN (UMNO)
N18	Manong	Shafie Mohamed Saman	BN (UMNO)
N19	Chemor	Yap Boon En	BN (PPP)
N20	Gopeng	P. Patto	DAP
N21	Guntong	Mohamed Salleh Nakhoda Hitam	DAP
N22	Kepayang	Lim Cho Hock	DAP
N23	Pasir Puteh	Daing Ibrahim Othman	DAP
N24	Kuala Pari	Lim Nyit Sin	DAP
N25	Pengkalan Baharu	Abdul Malek Ahmad	BN (UMNO)
N26	Pantai Remis	Young Heow Choo	DAP
N27	Belanja	Hisan Ibrahim	BN (UMNO)
N28	Bota	Abdul Latif Mat Lajim	BN (PAS)
N29	Tanjong Tualang	Cheong Kai Foo	BN (MCA)
N30	Kampar	Chan Heng Woh	DAP
N31	Tapah	Lim Yoon Yook	BN (MCA)
N32	Chenderiang	Munah Lebai Rafar	BN (UMNO)
N33	Sitiawan	R. Shanmugaveloo	BN (MIC)
N34	Pangkor	Phung Ah See @ Phung Teik Hua	DAP
N35	Kampong Gajah	Sapian Mat Sam	BN (UMNO)
N36	Sungei Manik	Mohamed Yusof Maidin	BN (UMNO)
N37	Pasir Bedamar	Thee Ah Kow	DAP
N38	Changkat Jong	Darus Mohamed Said	BN (UMNO)
N39	Bidor	Chin Kee Seong	BN (PPP)
N40	Slim	R. M. Idris	BN (UMNO)
N41	Rungkup	Mohamed Yaacob Mohamed	BN (UMNO)
N42	Hutan Melintang	Mahwany @ Radziah Marahuddin	BN (UMNO)

== Pahang ==
No.	State Constituency	Member	Party
BN 32
N01	Jelai	Ramli Abdul Ghani	BN (UMNO)
N02	Tanah Rata	Wong Lok Hoi	BN (Gerakan)
N03	Bukit Betong	Wan Abdul Rahman Wan Ibrahim	BN (UMNO)
N04	Bandar Lipis	Chin Hon Kit	BN (MCA)
N05	Benta	Zakaria Taha	BN (UMNO)
N06	Tahan	Harun Gintong	BN (UMNO)
N07	Tembeling	Abdul Rahman Bilal Akil	BN (UMNO)
N08	Jenderak	Mohamed Khairuddin Kawi	BN (UMNO)
N09	Bandar Jerantut	Ho Chock Keong	BN (MCA)
N10	Kerdau	Ahmad Sallehuddin Omar	BN (UMNO)
N11	Beserah	Ismail Siabit	BN (UMNO)
N12	Sungai Lembing	Wan Abdullah Wan Osman	BN (UMNO)
N13	Bandar Kuantan	Lim Ah Lek @ Lim Mok Siang	BN (MCA)
N14	Batu Talam	Abdul Rahman Ismail	BN (UMNO)
N15	Dong	Tengku Mustapha Tengku Setia Alam	BN (UMNO)
N16	Bandar Raub	Loke Kwok Kheong	BN (MCA)
N17	Paya Besar	Abdul Rashid Abdul Rahman	BN (UMNO)
N18	Bandar Maran	Sulong Awang Hitam	BN (UMNO)
N19	Jengka	Sariah Kamiso	BN (UMNO)
N20	Chenor	Mahmud Mat Taib	BN (UMNO)
N21	Karak	Chan Tan Chuan	BN (MCA)
N22	Bandar Bentong	Fu Ah Kow @ Poo Yew Choy	BN (MCA)
N23	Semantan	Abdul Malek Mohamed	BN (UMNO)
N24	Kuala Pahang	Muhamad Jusoh	BN (UMNO)
N25	Chini	Mohamed Abdul Ghani	BN (UMNO)
N26	Bandar Pekan	Shamsiah Abdul Hamid	BN (UMNO)
N27	Bukit Ibam	Mohamed Rusdi Mohamed Ariff	BN (PAS)
N28	Rompin	Abdul Latiff Kantan	BN (UMNO)
N29	Mentekab	Annuar Mohd. Seh	BN (UMNO)
N30	Bera	Mansor Silong	BN (UMNO)
N31	Triang	Ngau Boon Min	BN (MCA)
N32	Bandar Temerloh	Awang Ngah Tok Muda Ibrahim	BN (UMNO)

== Selangor ==
No.	State Constituency	Member	Party
BN 30 | IND 2 | DAP 1
N01	Sungei Ayer Tawar	Jamaluddin Suhaimi	BN (UMNO)
N02	Sabak	Lope Salleh Long @ Zainal Abidin	BN (UMNO)
N03	Sungei Besar	Mohamed Ghazali Kantan	BN (UMNO)
N04	Sungei Panjang	Hamdan Bakri	BN (PAS)
N05	Sekinchan	Mohamed Kassim Mohamed Yusof	BN (UMNO)
N06	Sungei Burong	Kamaruzaman Ahmad	BN (UMNO)
N07	Kalumpang	Shoib Ahmad	BN (UMNO)
N08	Kuala Kubu Baru	Chan Keong Hon	BN (MCA)
N09	Batang Kali	Rosedin Yaacob	BN (UMNO)
N10	Permatang	Mohamed Said Bahir	BN (UMNO)
N11	Asam Jawa	N. S. Maniam	BN (MIC)
N12	Jeram	Norsiah Abdul Rahim	BN (UMNO)
N13	Rawang	Lee Kim Sai	BN (MCA)
N14	Gombak	Zakaria Yahaya	BN (UMNO)
N15	Ampang	Lim Heng Kiap	BN (MCA)
N16	Dusun Tua	Mohamed Azmir Mohamed Nazir	BN (UMNO)
N17	Kajang	Lee Teck Su	IND
N18	Semenyih	Salmah Mohd. Salleh	BN (UMNO)
N19	Kapar	Sanad Said	BN (UMNO)
N20	Sementa	Onn Ismail	BN (UMNO)
N21	Selat Kelang	Gan Ching Yen	BN (MCA)
N22	Bukit Raja	Vadiveloo Govindasamy	BN (MIC)
N23	Bandar Kelang	Thong Kok Mau	BN (MCA)
N24	Kampong Jawa	Raja Zulkifli Raja Borhan	BN (UMNO)
N25	Petaling Jaya	Fan Yew Teng	DAP
N26	Sungei Way	V. L. Kandan	BN (MIC)
N27	Serdang	Yap Pian Hon	BN (MCA)
N28	Panglima Garang	Mohamed Kamil Abdul Ghani	BN (UMNO)
N29	Banting	Hormat Rafei	BN (UMNO)
N30	Morib	Ishak Pangat @ Shafaat from 6 May 1978	BN (UMNO)
N30	Morib	Harun Idris until 23 March 1978	BN (UMNO)
N31	Dengkil	Ahmad Razali Mohamad Ali	BN (UMNO)
N32	Sungei Pelek	Lim Tuan Siong	BN (MCA)
N33	Batu Laut	Abdul Jabar Mohamed Yusof	IND

== Negri Sembilan ==
No.	State Constituency	Member	Party
BN 21 | DAP 3
N01	Kuala Klawang	Lim Kim Kee	BN (MCA)
N02	Pertang	Aminuddin Abdul Manap	BN (UMNO)
N03	Bahau	Thong Hiang Kim	BN (MCA)
N04	Jempol	Jaafar Harun from 31 December 1977	BN (UMNO)
N04	Jempol	Mohamed Yassin Othman until 23 November 1977	BN (UMNO)
N05	Lenggeng	Soong Sang @ Yun Sang	BN (MCA)
N06	Pantai	Khatimah Ibrahim	BN (UMNO)
N07	Labu	Shahardin Hashim	BN (UMNO)
N08	Rantau	Sheikh Mohamed Hamid Mohamed Said	BN (UMNO)
N09	Rasah	John Fernandez	DAP
N10	Rahang	Chen Man Hin	DAP
N11	Sungei Ujong	Liew Ah Kim	DAP
N12	Terentang	Yazid Baba	BN (UMNO)
N13	Sri Menanti	Mansor Othman	BN (UMNO)
N14	Ulu Muar	Abdul Kadir Abdullah	BN (UMNO)
N15	Pilah	Tengku Kalsom Tengku Muda Chik	BN (UMNO)
N16	Johol	Hamzah Yatim	BN (UMNO)
N17	Jimah	Yap Ah Peng	BN (MCA)
N18	Si Rusa	A. Ponniah	BN (MIC)
N19	Pasir Panjang	Azahari Hamzah	BN (PAS)
N20	Linggi	Samad Said	BN (UMNO)
N21	Kota	Dahalan Aman	BN (UMNO)
N22	Gemencheh	Mohamad Taha Talib	BN (UMNO)
N23	Gemas	Mohamed Salleh Mohamed Hashim	BN (UMNO)
N24	Rompin	Yee Kok Ching	BN (MCA)

== Malacca ==
No.	State Constituency	Member	Party
BN 16 | DAP 4
N01	Taboh Naning	Abdul Razak Alias	BN (UMNO)
N02	Sungei Bahru	Abdul Ghani Ali	BN (UMNO)
N03	Machap	Yeow Kay	BN (MCA)
N04	Kelemak	Abdul Ghani Ishak	BN (UMNO)
N05	Masjid Tanah	Johari Mohd Yusoff	BN (UMNO)
N06	Batang Melaka	Lai See Liong	BN (MCA)
N07	Nyalas	Sabaruddin Yaakub	BN (UMNO)
N08	Ayer Panas	Hashim Yusoff	BN (UMNO)
N09	Serkam	Abdul Aziz Alias	BN (UMNO)
N10	Sungei Rambai	Ahmad Dahlan Salleh	BN (UMNO)
N11	Tanjong Minyak	Mohd. Nor Noordin	BN (PAS)
N12	Ayer Keroh	Hashim Pit	BN (UMNO)
N13	Ayer Molek	Mohamed Di Abdul Ghani	BN (UMNO)
N14	Sungei Udang	Ahmad Manap	BN (UMNO)
N15	Bukit Rambai	Fatimah Ahmad	BN (UMNO)
N16	Peringgit	Tan Cheng Swee	BN (MCA)
N17	Tranquerah	Chan Teck Chan	DAP
N18	Kubu	Lim Kit Siang	DAP
N19	Durian Daun	Yong Wee Yook	DAP
N20	Bandar Hilir	Bernard Sta Maria	DAP

== Johore ==
No.	State Constituency	Member	Party
BN 31 | DAP 1
N01	Buloh Kasap	G. Pasamanickam	BN (MIC)
N02	Ayer Panas	Teo Ah Kiang @ Chiang Kee Foon	BN (MCA)
N03	Bandar Segamat	Tan Peng Khoon	BN (MCA)
N04	Bukit Serampang	Talib Ali	BN (UMNO)
N05	Bekok	Ng Nam Seng	BN (MCA)
N06	Bandar Kluang	Lee Kaw	DAP
N07	Endau	Abdul Rahman Sabri	BN (UMNO)
N08	Mersing	Tiah Eng Bee	BN (MCA)
N09	Tangkak	Lau Kheng Lay	BN (MCA)
N10	Serom	Ngah Abdul Rahman	BN (UMNO)
N11	Jorak	Abdul Rahman Mahmud	BN (UMNO)
N12	Kesang	Othman Saat	BN (UMNO)
N13	Sri Lalang	Soo Ah Teck	BN (MCA)
N14	Sri Medan	Kamisan Ashari	BN (UMNO)
N15	Bandar Maharani	Chua Song Lim	BN (MCA)
N16	Parit Jawa	Shahadan Sabtu from 5 November 1977	BN (UMNO)
N16	Parit Jawa	Mohamed Zain Maidin until 13 September 1977	BN (UMNO)
N17	Layang-Layang	Law Lai Heng	BN (MCA)
N18	Kulai	Lau Tong	BN (MCA)
N19	Kota Tinggi	Salleh Tahir	BN (UMNO)
N20	Johore Lama	Mohamed Yusoff Jani	BN (UMNO)
N21	Parit Raja	Yusak Nawawi	BN (UMNO)
N22	Simpang Rengam	Syed Zain Edros Al-Shahab	BN (UMNO)
N23	Sri Menanti	Zaharah Abdul Majid	BN (UMNO)
N24	Peserai	Ridwan Salim Bilal	BN (UMNO)
N25	Bandar Penggaram	Lim Tong Keng from 5 February 1977	BN (MCA)
N25	Bandar Penggaram	Tan Siew Yong until 27 December 1976	BN (MCA)
N26	Rengit	Ahmad Paiman	BN (UMNO)
N27	Benut	Jalok Daing Malibok	BN (UMNO)
N28	Kukup	Abdullah Sudin	BN (UMNO)
N29	Gelang Patah	Mohd. Yunus Sulaiman	BN (UMNO)
N30	Skudai	Elias Udin	BN (UMNO)
N31	Tiram	Hasnah Ahmad	BN (UMNO)
N32	Tanjong Petri	Abdul Hamid Rahmat	BN (UMNO)

== Sabah ==
=== 1976–1981 ===
No.	State Constituency	Member	Party
BERJAYA 28 | USNO 20
N01	Banggi	Mustapha Harun	Sabah Alliance (USNO)
N02	Kudat	Yong Sze Kiun	BERJAYA
N03	Bengkoka	Abdul Salam Harun	Sabah Alliance (USNO)
N04	Matunggong	George Mojuntin from 29 July 1978	BERJAYA
N04	Matunggong	Amil Matiggi 20 December 1977–1912 June 1978	BERJAYA
N04	Matunggong	Michael Francis Wong until 23 November 1977	BERJAYA
N05	Langkon	Michael Madinal	BERJAYA
N06	Tandek	Villson Malingka	BERJAYA
N07	Usukan	Mohamed Said Keruak	Sabah Alliance (USNO)
N08	Tempasuk	Ashkar Hasbollah	Sabah Alliance (USNO)
N09	Kebuyau	Yapin Gimpoton	BERJAYA
N10	Sugut	Pengiran Khafid Pengiran Salleh from 21 May 1980	BERJAYA
N10	Sugut	Betua Abbah until 4 April 1980	Sabah Alliance (USNO)
N11	Semawang	Salleh Otik	Sabah Alliance (USNO)
N12	Labuk	Paul Baklin	BERJAYA
N13	Sulaman	Jumah Salim	Sabah Alliance (USNO)
N14	Tamparuli	Peter James Ongkili	BERJAYA
N15	Kiulu	Rahimah Stephens from 15 July 1976	BERJAYA
N15	Kiulu	Fuad Stephens until 1976	BERJAYA
N16	Kundasang	Mynoor Ginggor	BERJAYA
N17	Ranau	Jirin Salium from 24 November 1979	BERJAYA
N17	Ranau	Amin Jahali until 4 October 1979	Sabah Alliance (USNO)
N18	Tambunan	Joseph Pairin Kitingan	BERJAYA
N19	Likas	Wong Yau Ket	BERJAYA
N20	Kota Kinabalu	Lim Guan Sing from 31 July 1976	BERJAYA
N20	Kota Kinabalu	Chong Thain Vun until 1976	BERJAYA
N21	Tanjong Aru	Matthew Gonzaga from 31 July 1976	BERJAYA
N21	Tanjong Aru	Darius Binion until 1976	BERJAYA
N22	Inanam	Marcel Leiking from 29 July 1978	BERJAYA
N22	Inanam	Clarence E. Mansul until 12 June 1978	BERJAYA
N23	Moyog	Conrad Mojuntin from 31 July 1976	BERJAYA
N23	Moyog	Peter Mojuntin until 1976	BERJAYA
N24	Kawang	Fred Sinidol @ Tokudung	BERJAYA
N25	Elopura	Yap Pak Leong	BERJAYA
N26	Bandar Sandakan	Stephen Wong Soon Yu	BERJAYA
N27	Karamunting	Lau Pui Keong	BERJAYA
N28	Sekong	Pengiran Ahmad Pengiran Indar	Sabah Alliance (USNO)
N29	Kuala Kinabatangan	Pengiran Galpam Pengiran Indar	Sabah Alliance (USNO)
N30	Kuamut	Abdul Malek Chua	BERJAYA
N31	Papar	Mohamed Noor Mansor from 31 July 1976	BERJAYA
N31	Papar	Salleh Sulong until 1976	BERJAYA
N32	Bongawan	Dzulkifli Abdul Hamid	Sabah Alliance (USNO)
N33	Kuala Penyu	Fadzil Wong	BERJAYA
N34	Labuan	Mohammed Omar Beldram	Sabah Alliance (USNO)
N35	Klias	Mohammad Taufeck Asneh	Sabah Alliance (USNO)
N36	Lumadan	Mohamed Dun Banir	BERJAYA
N37	Bingkor	Ayub Aman	BERJAYA
N38	Sook	Suffian Koroh	BERJAYA
N39	Pensiangan	Abu Bakar Anik	BERJAYA
N40	Lahad Datu	Mohamed Sunoh Marso	BERJAYA
N41	Kunak	Salim Bacho	Sabah Alliance (USNO)
N42	Semporna	Sakaran Dandai	Sabah Alliance (USNO)
N43	Tenom	Harris Salleh	BERJAYA
N44	Sipitang	Maidin Jais	Sabah Alliance (USNO)
N45	Kemabong	Justin Sanggau from 21 May 1980	BERJAYA
N45	Kemabong	Albert Chew Ah Nyuk until 4 April 1980	BERJAYA
N46	Merotai	Mohamed Tambi	Sabah Alliance (USNO)
N47	Balung	S. Abas S. Ali from 24 November 1979	BERJAYA
N47	Balung	Abu Bakar Titingan until 12 October 1979	Sabah Alliance (USNO)
N48	Bandar Tawau	Hiew Nyuk Yin	BERJAYA

== Sarawak ==
=== 1974–1979 ===
No.	State Constituency	Member	Party
BN 30 | SNAP 18
N01	Lundu	Chong Kim Mook	BN (SUPP)
N02	Bau	Lee Nyan Choi	SNAP
N03	Kuching Barat	Abang Abu Bakar Abang Mustapha	BN (PBB)
N04	Kuching Timor	Chua Kock Meng from 17 March 1979	IND
N04	Kuching Timor	Lo Foot Kee until 20 February 1979	SNAP
N05	Semariang	Hafsah Harun from July 1976	BN (PBB)
N05	Semariang	Ajibah Abol until 1976	BN (PBB)
N06	Sekama	Sim Kheng Hong	BN (SUPP)
N07	Sebandi	Abdul Rahman Hamzah	BN (PBB)
N08	Muara Tuang	Adenan Satem from 20 January 1979	BN (PBB)
N08	Muara Tuang	Mohamad Musa until 17 November 1978	BN (PBB)
N09	Batu Kawah	Chong Kiun Kong	BN (SUPP)
N10	Bengoh	Segus Ginyai	BN (SUPP)
N11	Tarat	Arthur Madeng	BN (PBB)
N12	Tebakang	Michael Ben Panggi	SNAP
N13	Semera	Mohammed Puteh @ Lee Thiam Kee	BN (PBB)
N14	Gedong	Mohammad Tawan Abdullah @ Hilary Tawan Masan	BN (PBB)
N15	Lingga-Sebuyau	Daniel Tajem Miri	SNAP
N16	Simanggang	Hollis Tini	BN (SUPP)
N17	Engkilili-Skrang	Nadeng Linggoh	SNAP
N18	Ulu Ai	David Jemut	SNAP
N19	Saribas	Abang Ahmad Urai Abang Mohideen	BN (PBB)
N20	Layar	Alfred Jabu Numpang	BN (PBB)
N21	Kalaka	Ahmad Zaidi Adruce	BN (PBB)
N22	Krian	Dunstan Endawie Enchana	SNAP
N23	Kuala Rajang	Abdul Rahman Ya'kub	BN (PBB)
N24	Repok	Chong Siew Chiang	BN (SUPP)
N25	Matu-Daro	Awang Hipni Pengiran Anu	BN (PBB)
N26	Binatang	Anthony Teo Tiao Gin	BN (SUPP)
N27	Sibu Tengah	Chew Kim Poon	BN (SUPP)
N28	Sibu Luar	Wong Soon Kai	BN (SUPP)
N29	Igan	Ling Beng Siong	BN (SUPP)
N30	Dudong	Sandah Jarrow	SNAP
N31	Balingian	Wan Habib Syed Mahmud from 11 June 1977	BN (PBB)
N31	Balingian	Salleh Jafaruddin until 14 April 1977	BN (PBB)
N32	Oya	Edwin Esnen Unang	BN (PBB)
N33	Pakan	Jawie Wilson Masing	SNAP
N34	Meluan	Gramong Jelian	SNAP
N35	Machan	Gramong Juna from 16 September 1978	BN (SNAP)
N35	Machan	Leo Moggie Irok until 28 July 1978	SNAP
N36	Ngemah	Francis Umau a/k Empam	SNAP
N37	Song	Ngelambong Banggau	BN (PBB)
N38	Pelagus	Jonathan Sabai Ajing	SNAP
N39	Baleh	Peter Gani Kiai	SNAP
N40	Belaga	Nyipa Kilah @ Nyipa Bato	BN (SUPP)
N41	Tatau	Joseph Mamat Samuel	SNAP
N42	Kemena	Celestine Ujang Jilan	BN (PBB)
N43	Subis	Mumin Kader	BN (PBB)
N44	Miri	Chia Chin Shin	BN (SUPP)
N45	Marudi	Edward Jeli Belayong	SNAP
N46	Telang Usan	Joseph Balan Seling	SNAP
N47	Limbang	James Wong Kim Min	SNAP
N48	Lawas	Awang Daud Pengiran Matusin	BN (PBB)
