= List of Malaysian State Assembly Representatives (1978–1982) =

Subnational legislature representatives

List of Malaysian State Assembly Representatives (1974–1978)
List of Malaysian State Assembly Representatives (1978–1982)
List of Malaysian State Assembly Representatives (1982–1986)

The following are the members of the Dewan Undangan Negeri or state assemblies, elected in the 1978 state election and by-elections. Also included is the list of the Sabah and Sarawak state assembly members who were elected in 1981 and 1979 respectively. During this period, Mahathir Mohamad was sworn in as Malaysia’s Prime Minister on July 16, 1981, marking the beginning of his 22-year tenure.

== Perlis ==
No.	State Constituency	Member	Party
BN 12
N01	Titi Tinggi	Ng Eng Toon @ Goh Eng Toon from 19 August 1978	BN (MCA)
N01	Titi Tinggi	Leong Choon Ling until 8 July 1978	BN (MCA)
N02	Chuping	Ahmad Said	BN (UMNO)
N03	Bintong	Jaafar Hassan	BN (UMNO)
N04	Bandar Kangar	Tan Thean Choo (陈天慈)	BN (MCA)
N05	Paya	Mahmud Hashim	BN (UMNO)
N06	Oran	Ali Ahmad	BN (UMNO)
N07	Kuala Perlis	Mohamed Noor Yub	BN (UMNO)
N08	Kayang	Hazim Abu Bakar	BN (UMNO)
N09	Utan Aji	Idrus Kassim	BN (UMNO)
N10	Bandar Arau	Syed Ahmad Syed Alwi	BN (UMNO)
N11	Kurong Anai	Abu Bakar Ahmad	BN (UMNO)
N12	Sanglang	Saad @ Md Zain Hamzah	BN (UMNO)

== Kedah ==
No.	State Constituency	Member	Party
BN 19 | PAS 7
N01	Langkawi	Syed Nahar Syed Sheh Shahabudin	BN (UMNO)
N02	Jerlun	Abu Bakar Omar	PAS
N03	Tunjang	Hanafi Ramli	BN (UMNO)
N04	Jitra	Osman @ Mohd Daud Aroff	BN (UMNO)
N05	Kuala Nerang	Azizah Taib	BN (UMNO)
N06	Pokok Sena	Baharom Bakar	BN (UMNO)
N07	Anak Bukit	Wahab Sulaiman	PAS
N08	Pengkalan Kundor	Jamaluddin Lebai Bakar	BN (UMNO)
N09	Alor Merah	Mohd. Abu Bakar Rautin Ibrahim	BN (UMNO)
N10	Bandar Alor Setar	Cheah Chong Chiew	BN (MCA)
N11	Langgar-Limbong	Sudin Wahab	PAS
N12	Bukit Raya	Safirol Hashim from 5 April 1980	BN (UMNO)
N12	Bukit Raya	Ismail @ Shafie Kassim until 11 February 1980	PAS
N13	Sik	Hamzah Abdul Latif	PAS
N14	Pendang	Shaari Abu Bakar	BN (UMNO)
N15	Bayu	Seroji Haron	BN (UMNO)
N16	Kupang	Mohd Ramli Abdullah	PAS
N17	Sala	Yahaya Junid	PAS
N18	Yan	Abdullah Ismail	BN (UMNO)
N19	Jeniang	Zainol Abidin Johari	BN (UMNO)
N20	Merbok	Hashim Osman	BN (UMNO)
N21	Tikam Batu	Ong Chow Song	BN (MCA)
N21	Tikam Batu	Ong Chow Song	BN (Gerakan)
N22	Kuala Ketil	Supramaniam Ahnasamy Pillai	BN (MIC)
N23	Lunas	Sang Chok Seong (方卓雄)	BN (MCA)
N24	Merbau Pulas	Mustapha Kassim	BN (UMNO)
N25	Kulim	Leong Man Kai	BN (MCA)
N26	Serdang	Mohamed Muslim Othman	BN (UMNO)

== Kelantan ==
No.	State Constituency	Member	Party
BN 23 | BERJASA 11 | PAS 2
N01	Simpangan	Tahir Abdul Aziz	BERJASA
N02	Sungei Pinang	Che Lat Kassim	BN (UMNO)
N03	Wakaf Bharu	Omar Awang Kechik	BN (UMNO)
N04	Semut Api	Mohamad Hussin	BN (UMNO)
N05	Kemumin	Umar Ibrahim	BERJASA
N06	Sering	Nik Abdullah Arshad	PAS
N07	Tendong	Ghazali Awang Ibrahim from 10 June 1978	BERJASA
N07	Tendong	Mohamed Nasir until 19 April 1978	BERJASA
N08	Meranti	Hanifa Ahmad	BERJASA
N09	Bandar Pasir Mas	Abdullah Che Hitam	BN (UMNO)
N10	Sungei Keladi	Foo Chow Yong @ Foo Hong Sang	BN (MCA)
N11	Telipot	Ahmad Rastom Ahmad Maher	BN (UMNO)
N12	Kubang Kerian	Nik Bahari Shah Yusoff	BERJASA
N13	Tawang	Dato’ Tuan Haji Mohd Daud Ali	BERJASA
N14	Perupok	Wan Mohamad Wan Ahmad	BERJASA
N15	Jelawat	Mohamad Hassan	BN (UMNO)
N16	Gual Periok	Hussein Ahmad	BN (UMNO)
N17	Lemal	Nor Mohamad Mohd. Din	BERJASA
N18	Tok Uban	Daud Yatimee Ahmad	BERJASA
N19	Salor	Sofian Awang	BERJASA
N20	Ketereh	Ariffin Mahmud	BN (UMNO)
N21	Peringat	Wan Hashim Wan Ahmad	BERJASA
N22	Bukit Panau	Abdul Latif Abdul Rahman	BN (UMNO)
N23	Lanas	Mohamed Yaacob	BN (UMNO)
N24	Gual Ipoh	Mustafa Yaakub	BN (UMNO)
N25	Pulai Chondong	Abdullah Muhammad	BN (UMNO)
N26	Bandar Machang	Ibrahim Mohamed	BN (UMNO)
N27	Sungei Rasau	Yahaya Yusoff	BN (UMNO)
N28	Bandar Pasir Puteh	Raja Mahmud Raja Mamat	BN (UMNO)
N29	Cherang Ruku	Wan Omar Wan Majid	BN (UMNO)
N30	Selising	Wan Mohamed Wan Abu Bakar	BN (UMNO)
N31	Temangan	Salleh Che Harun	BN (UMNO)
N32	Guchil	Mohamad Isa	BN (UMNO)
N33	Pahi	Abdul Aziz Talib	BN (UMNO)
N34	Jeli	Abdul Samad Drahman	BN (UMNO)
N35	Gua Musang	Abdul Ghani Abu Bakar	BN (UMNO)
N36	Manek Urai	Wan Abdullah Wan Su	PAS

== Trengganu ==
No.	State Constituency	Member	Party
BN 28
N01	Kuala Besut	Wan Zakaria Wan Abdul Rahman from 30 July 1979	BN (UMNO)
N01	Kuala Besut	Zakaria Muda until 24 June 1979	BN (UMNO)
N02	Kampong Raja	Abu Bakar Ahmad	BN (UMNO)
N03	Bukit Kenak	Abdullah Jusoh	BN (UMNO)
N04	Ulu Besut	Hussein Abdullah	BN (UMNO)
N05	Setiu	Tengku Mahmud Mansur	BN (UMNO)
N06	Langkap	Salleh Mohamed	BN (UMNO)
N07	Batu Rakit	Wan Ibrahim Wan Othman	BN (UMNO)
N08	Seberang Takir	Abdul Rashid Ngah	BN (UMNO)
N09	Telemung	Ahmad Sidi Ismail	BN (UMNO)
N10	Binjai	Abdul Rahman Ali	BN (UMNO)
N11	Tanggol	Salleh Ismail	BN (UMNO)
N12	Kuala Brang	Mohamed Nor Abdullah	BN (UMNO)
N13	Jeram	Abdul Rashid Muhammad	BN (UMNO)
N14	Bukit Tunggal	Abdul Rahman Awang	BN (UMNO)
N15	Manir	Ismail Yusof	BN (UMNO)
N16	Bukit Payong	Abdul Razak Taib	BN (UMNO)
N17	Bandar	Tok Teng Sai	BN (MCA)
N18	Ladang	Abu Bakar Daud	BN (UMNO)
N19	Wakaf Mempelam	Shafie Abdul Rahman	BN (UMNO)
N20	Batu Burok	Abdul Muttalib Salleh	BN (UMNO)
N21	Marang	Tengku Zahid Musa	BN (UMNO)
N22	Merchang	Mohamed Adib Omar	BN (UMNO)
N23	Sura	Mustaffa Abdul Majeed	BN (UMNO)
N24	Jerangau	Muda Abdullah	BN (UMNO)
N25	Paka	Ismail Haitami Salleh	BN (UMNO)
N26	Kemasek	Wan Adnan Wan Ismail	BN (UMNO)
N27	Bukit Bandi	Ismail Al-Falah Salleh	BN (UMNO)
N28	Chukai	Wan Mokhtar Ahmad	BN (UMNO)

== Penang ==
No.	State Constituency	Member	Party
BN 20 | DAP 5 | PAS 1 | IND 1
N01	Penaga	Hassan Mohd. Noh	BN (UMNO)
N02	Bertam	Abdul Rahman Abbas	BN (UMNO)
N03	Tasek Gelugor	Mohamed Noor Ahmad	BN (UMNO)
N04	Bagan Ajam	Ibrahim Abdul Razak	BN (UMNO)
N05	Bagan Jermal	Sak Cheng Lum	BN (MCA)
N06	Bagan Dalam	T. Subbiah	BN (MIC)
N07	Sungai Dua	Zabidi Ali	PAS
N08	Kubang Semang	Mohamad Noor Bakar	BN (UMNO)
N09	Penanti	Abdullah Mohamad @ Mahmud	BN (UMNO)
N10	Bukit Tengah	Liang Thau Sang	BN (Gerakan)
N11	Pekan Bukit Mertajam	Seow Hun Khim	DAP
N12	Machang Bubok	Lim Heng Tee	BN (Gerakan)
N13	Bukit Tambun	Ng Swee Ching	BN (MCA)
N14	Sungai Bakap	Teoh Kooi Sneah	BN (Gerakan)
N15	Sungai Acheh	Ahmad Salleh	BN (UMNO)
N16	Telok Bahang	Ahmad Radhi Pachee	BN (UMNO)
N17	Sungai Nibong	Tan Chong Teik (陈崇德)	BN (Gerakan)
N18	Bayan Lepas	Khalid Ahmad Suleiman	BN (UMNO)
N19	Tanjong Bunga	Khoo Gark Kim	BN (Gerakan)
N20	Ayer Itam	Peter Paul Dason	DAP
N21	Paya Terubong	Chin Nyok Soo	DAP
N22	Padang Kota	Lim Chong Eu	BN (Gerakan)
N23	Kampong Kolam	Ooi Ean Kwong recontest, won on 9 December 1978	DAP
N24	Pengkalan Kota	Lim Kean Siew from 15 November 1980	BN (MCA)
N24	Pengkalan Kota	Chooi Yew Choy until 26 September 1980	IND
N25	Datok Keramat	Teh Ewe Lim	BN (Gerakan)
N26	Sungai Pinang	Ong Hean Tee	BN (Gerakan)
N27	Bukit Gelugor	Karpal Singh	DAP

== Perak ==
No.	State Constituency	Member	Party
BN 32 | DAP 9 | PAS 1
N01	Temengor	Shamsuddin Din	BN (UMNO)
N02	Kenering	Wan Mohamed Wan Teh	BN (UMNO)
N03	Selama	Abdul Aziz Ahmad	BN (UMNO)
N04	Batu Kurau	Abdul Manan Mohamed Ali	BN (UMNO)
N05	Simpang Lima	Ismail Abdul Rauf	BN (UMNO)
N06	Kuala Kurau	Abdul Rahman Mokhtar	PAS
N07	Alor Pongsu	Mohamed Abas	BN (UMNO)
N08	Gunong Semanggol	Zainal Abidin Zin	BN (UMNO)
N09	Lintang	Mohamed Bashir Mohamed Bahari	BN (UMNO)
N10	Jalong	Lim Keng Yaik	BN (Gerakan)
N11	Kamunting	Ahmad Nawi	BN (UMNO)
N12	Klian Pauh	Lim Eng Chuan	DAP
N13	Changkat Jering	Ang Chin Wah	BN (Gerakan)
N14	Bukit Gantang	Ahmad Mansor	BN (UMNO)
N15	Lenggong	Saidin Mat Piah	BN (UMNO)
N16	Lubok Merbau	Mior Aris Mior Abu Bakar	BN (UMNO)
N17	Bukit Chandan	Wong Yee Kao	BN (MCA)
N18	Manong	Shafie Mohamed Saman	BN (UMNO)
N19	Chemor	Yap Boon En (叶文恩)	BN (PPP)
N20	Gopeng	P. Patto	DAP
N21	Guntong	Mohamed Salleh Nakhoda Hitam	DAP
N22	Kepayang	Lim Cho Hock	DAP
N23	Pasir Puteh	Chian Heng Kai	DAP
N24	Kuala Pari	Lim Nyit Sin	DAP
N25	Pengkalan Baharu	Abdul Malik Ahmad	BN (UMNO)
N26	Pantai Remis	Young Heow Choo	DAP
N27	Belanja	Ahmad Azizuddin Zainal Abidin	BN (UMNO)
N28	Bota	Rokiah Kayat	BN (UMNO)
N29	Tanjong Tualang	Cheong Kai Foo	BN (MCA)
N30	Kampar	Lee Kak Hoi (李格海)	DAP
N31	Tapah	Lim Yoon Yook	BN (MCA)
N32	Chenderiang	Abdul Wahab Abu Bakar	BN (UMNO)
N33	Sitiawan	Rajasegaran Samy Nathan	BN (MIC)
N34	Pangkor	Peter Tang Ah Lik	BN (MCA)
N35	Kampong Gajah	Ramli Ngah Talib	BN (UMNO)
N36	Sungei Manik	Mohamed Yusof Maidin	BN (UMNO)
N37	Pasir Bedamar	Thee Ah Kow	DAP
N38	Changkat Jong	Darus Mohamed Said	BN (UMNO)
N39	Bidor	Peter Chin Gan Oon (陈仁安)	BN (MCA)
N40	Slim	Idris Abdul Rauf	BN (UMNO)
N41	Rungkup	Mohamed Yaacob Mohamed	BN (UMNO)
N42	Hutan Melintang	Mahwany @ Radziah Marahuddin	BN (UMNO)

== Pahang ==
No.	State Constituency	Member	Party
BN 32
N01	Jelai	Mohamed Hashim Idrus	BN (UMNO)
N02	Tanah Rata	Sangaralingam Muthu Muthaya	BN (MIC)
N03	Bukit Betong	Abu Bakar Chu	BN (UMNO)
N04	Bandar Lipis	Chin Hon Kit	BN (MCA)
N05	Benta	Zuki Kamaluddin	BN (UMNO)
N06	Tahan	Harun Jaafar	BN (UMNO)
N07	Tembeling	Abdul Rahman Bilal Akil	BN (UMNO)
N08	Jenderak	Abdullah Hashim Mohamed Ali	BN (UMNO)
N09	Bandar Jerantut	Ho Chock Keong	BN (MCA)
N10	Kerdau	Mohd Lazim	BN (UMNO)
N11	Beserah	Abdul Rahim Abu Bakar	BN (UMNO)
N12	Sungai Lembing	Wan Abdullah Wan Osman	BN (UMNO)
N13	Bandar Kuantan	Lim Ah Lek @ Lim Mok Siang	BN (MCA)
N14	Batu Talam	Abdul Razak Hitam	BN (UMNO)
N15	Dong	Tengku Mustapha Tengku Seti	BN (UMNO)
N16	Bandar Raub	Tan Liew Thong (陈流通)	BN (MCA)
N17	Paya Besar	Abdul Rashid Abdul Rahman	BN (UMNO)
N18	Bandar Maran	Nasir Mat Piah	BN (UMNO)
N19	Jengka	Sariah Kamiso	BN (UMNO)
N20	Chenor	Mahmud Mat Taib	BN (UMNO)
N21	Karak	Chan Tan Chuan (陈赞全)	BN (MCA)
N22	Bandar Bentong	Fu Ah Kow @ Poo Yew Choy	BN (MCA)
N23	Semantan	Abdul Malek Mohamed	BN (UMNO)
N24	Kuala Pahang	Hashim Mohamed Zin	BN (UMNO)
N25	Chini	Mohamed Abdul Ghani	BN (UMNO)
N26	Bandar Pekan	Shamsiah Abdul Hamid	BN (UMNO)
N27	Bukit Ibam	Mohd Khalil Yaakob	BN (UMNO)
N28	Rompin	Abdul Latif Kantan	BN (UMNO)
N29	Mentekab	Idris Long	BN (UMNO)
N30	Bera	Jaafar Salleh	BN (UMNO)
N31	Triang	Ngau Boon Min	BN (MCA)
N32	Bandar Temerloh	Awang Ngah Tok Muda Ibrahim	BN (UMNO)

== Selangor ==
No.	State Constituency	Member	Party
BN 29 | DAP 3 | IND 1
N01	Sungei Ayer Tawar	Khalil Kasmijan	BN (UMNO)
N02	Sabak	Mohamad Yusof Abdul Latif	BN (UMNO)
N03	Sungei Besar	Mohamed Ghazali Kantan	BN (UMNO)
N04	Sungei Panjang	Ariffin Mat Rawi	BN (UMNO)
N05	Sekinchan	Mohamed Kassim Mohamed Yusof	BN (UMNO)
N06	Sungei Burong	Kamaruzaman Ahmad	BN (UMNO)
N07	Kalumpang	Shoib Ahmad	BN (UMNO)
N08	Kuala Kubu Baru	Pan Su Peng	DAP
N09	Batang Kali	Rosedin Yaacob	BN (UMNO)
N10	Permatang	Zaleha Ismail	BN (UMNO)
N11	Asam Jawa	N. S. Maniam	BN (MIC)
N12	Jeram	Norsiah Abdul Rahim	BN (UMNO)
N13	Rawang	Lee Kim Sai	BN (MCA)
N14	Gombak	Zakaria Yahaya	BN (UMNO)
N15	Ampang	Tan Kui Sui	BN (MCA)
N16	Dusun Tua	Mohamed Azmir Mohamed Nazir	BN (UMNO)
N17	Kajang	Liew Ah Kim	DAP
N18	Semenyih	Abdul Hamid Mohamed Said	BN (UMNO)
N19	Kapar	Sanad Said	BN (UMNO)
N20	Sementa	Onn Ismail	BN (UMNO)
N21	Selat Kelang	Gan Ching Yen	BN (MCA)
N22	Bukit Raja	Vadiveloo Govindasamy	BN (MIC)
N23	Bandar Kelang	Tong Kok Mau	BN (MCA)
N24	Kampong Jawa	Raja Zulkifli Raja Borhan from 29 July 1978	BN (UMNO)
N25	Petaling Jaya	Soong Siew Hoong	BN (Gerakan)
N26	Sungei Way	V. L. Kandan	BN (MIC)
N27	Serdang	Lee Lam Thye	DAP
N28	Panglima Garang	Mohamed Kamil Abdul Ghani	BN (UMNO)
N29	Banting	Hormat Rafei	BN (UMNO)
N30	Morib	Ishak Pangat @ Shafaat	BN (UMNO)
N31	Dengkil	Ahmad Razali Mohamad Ali	BN (UMNO)
N32	Sungei Pelek	Choo Yong Fatt	BN (MCA)
N33	Batu Laut	Abdul Jabar Mohamed Yusof	IND

== Negri Sembilan ==
No.	State Constituency	Member	Party
BN 21 | DAP 3
N01	Kuala Klawang	Lim Kim Kee	BN (MCA)
N02	Pertang	Rais Yatim	BN (UMNO)
N03	Bahau	Thong Hiang Kim	BN (MCA)
N04	Jempol	Jaafar Harun	BN (UMNO)
N05	Lenggeng	Soong Sang @ Yun Sang	BN (MCA)
N06	Pantai	Khatimah Ibrahim	BN (UMNO)
N07	Labu	Shahardin Hashim	BN (UMNO)
N08	Rantau	Sheikh Mohamed Hamid Mohamed Said	BN (UMNO)
N09	Rasah	M. Kuppusamy	DAP
N10	Rahang	Chen Man Hin	DAP
N11	Sungei Ujong	Hu Sepang	DAP
N12	Terentang	Yazid Baba	BN (UMNO)
N13	Sri Menanti	Ahmad Kasim	BN (UMNO)
N14	Ulu Muar	Ali Manaf from 17 September 1981	BN (UMNO)
N14	Ulu Muar	Abdul Kadir Abdullah until 1981	BN (UMNO)
N15	Pilah	Tengku Kalsom Tengku Muda Chik	BN (UMNO)
N16	Johol	Hamzah Yatim	BN (UMNO)
N17	Jimah	Yap Ah Peng (叶安平)	BN (MCA)
N18	Si Rusa	A. Ponniah	BN (MIC)
N19	Pasir Panjang	Mustaffa Hassan	BN (UMNO)
N20	Linggi	Mohd Isa Abdul Samad	BN (UMNO)
N21	Kota	Dahalan Amin	BN (UMNO)
N22	Gemencheh	Mohamad Taha Talib	BN (UMNO)
N23	Gemas	Mohamed Salleh Mohamed Hashim	BN (UMNO)
N24	Rompin	Yee Kok Ching	BN (MCA)

== Malacca ==
No.	State Constituency	Member	Party
BN 16 | DAP 4
N01	Taboh Naning	Abdul Razak Alias	BN (UMNO)
N02	Sungei Bahru	Mohamed Jais	BN (UMNO)
N03	Machap	Ng Kim Fong	BN (MCA)
N04	Kelemak	Abdul Jalil Abdul Rahman	BN (UMNO)
N05	Masjid Tanah	Idris Ghani	BN (UMNO)
N06	Batang Melaka	Lim Soo Kiang	BN (MCA)
N07	Nyalas	Abdul Aziz Tapa	BN (UMNO)
N08	Ayer Panas	Mohd Adib Mohamad Adam	BN (UMNO)
N09	Serkam	Abdul Aziz Alias	BN (UMNO)
N10	Sungei Rambai	Ahmad Dahlan Salleh	BN (UMNO)
N11	Tanjong Minyak	Ahmad Nordin Mohamed Amin	BN (UMNO)
N12	Ayer Keroh	Samad Kassim	BN (UMNO)
N13	Ayer Molek	Mohamed Di Abdul Ghani	BN (UMNO)
N14	Sungei Udang	Abdul Rashid Othman	BN (UMNO)
N15	Bukit Rambai	Fatimah Ahmad	BN (UMNO)
N16	Peringgit	Tee Cheng Yok	BN (MCA)
N17	Tranquerah	Chan Teck Chan	DAP
N18	Kubu	Lim Kit Siang	DAP
N19	Durian Daun	Yong Wee Yook	DAP
N20	Bandar Hilir	Bernard Sta Maria	DAP

== Johore ==
No.	State Constituency	Member	Party
BN 31 | DAP 1
N01	Buloh Kasap	M. K. Muthusamy	BN (MIC)
N02	Ayer Panas	Teo Ah Kiang @ Chiang Kee Foon	BN (MCA)
N03	Bandar Segamat	Tan Peng Khoon	BN (MCA)
N04	Bukit Serampang	Talib Ali	BN (UMNO)
N05	Bekok	Ng Nam Seng	BN (MCA)
N06	Bandar Kluang	Lee Kaw	DAP
N07	Endau	Abdul Rahman Sabri	BN (UMNO)
N08	Mersing	Lim Ik Kim	BN (MCA)
N09	Tangkak	Lau Kheng Lay	BN (MCA)
N10	Serom	Ngah Abdul Rahman	BN (UMNO)
N11	Jorak	Abdul Rahman Mahmud	BN (UMNO)
N12	Kesang	Othman Saat	BN (UMNO)
N13	Sri Lalang	Sim Geok Peak (Chinese: 沈玉壁)	BN (MCA)
N14	Sri Medan	Kamisan Ashari	BN (UMNO)
N15	Bandar Maharani	Musa Ismail	BN (UMNO)
N16	Parit Jawa	Shahadan Sabtu	BN (UMNO)
N17	Layang-Layang	Law Boon King @ Low Boon Hong	BN (MCA)
N18	Kulai	Lau Tong	BN (MCA)
N19	Kota Tinggi	Hasnah Ahmad	BN (UMNO)
N20	Johore Lama	Sema'on @ Ma'on Omar	BN (UMNO)
N21	Parit Raja	Sharif Lassim	BN (UMNO)
N22	Simpang Rengam	Syed Zain Edros Al-Shahab	BN (UMNO)
N23	Sri Menanti	Zaharah Abdul Majid	BN (UMNO)
N24	Peserai	Ridwan Salim Bilal	BN (UMNO)
N25	Bandar Penggaram	Lim Tong Keng	BN (MCA)
N26	Rengit	Ahmad Paiman	BN (UMNO)
N27	Benut	Jalok Daing Malibok	BN (UMNO)
N28	Kukup	Abdullah Sudin	BN (UMNO)
N29	Gelang Patah	Mohd. Yunus Sulaiman	BN (UMNO)
N30	Skudai	Ali Othman	BN (UMNO)
N31	Tiram	Jaafar Hamzah	BN (UMNO)
N32	Tanjong Petri	Law Lai Heng	BN (MCA)

== Sabah ==
=== 1981–1985 ===
No.	State Constituency	Member	Party
BERJAYA 44 | USNO 3 | PCBS 1
N01	Banggi	Yahya Othman from 28 January 1983	BN (BERJAYA)
N01	Banggi	Abdul Salam Harun until 1983	USNO
N02	Kudat	Chong Kah Kiat	BN (BERJAYA)
N03	Bengkoka	Jasni Piut from 29 April 1981	BN (BERJAYA)
N04	Matunggong	Michael Francis Wong @ Mohamad Faizal	BN (BERJAYA)
N05	Langkon	Michael Madinal	BN (BERJAYA)
N06	Tandek	Villson Malingka from 1 October 1982	BN (BERJAYA)
N06	Tandek	Dason Suran Gaban until 1982	BN (BERJAYA)
N07	Usukan	Pandikar Amin Mulia from 1 October 1982	USNO
N07	Usukan	Mohamed Said Keruak until 1982	USNO
N08	Tempasuk	Mohamed Noor Mansoor	BN (BERJAYA)
N09	Kebuyau	Yapin Gimpoton @ Timothy	BN (BERJAYA)
N10	Sugut	Pengiran Abdul Kafid Pengiran Salleh	BN (BERJAYA)
N11	Semawang	Salleh Otik	BN (BERJAYA)
N12	Labuk	K. K. Paul Baklin Gurandi	BN (BERJAYA)
N13	Sulaman	Nawawi Budin	BN (BERJAYA)
N14	Tamparuli	Clarence E. Mansul from 16 July 1983	BN (BERJAYA)
N14	Tamparuli	James Ongkili until 1983	BN (BERJAYA)
N15	Kiulu	Rahimah Stephens	BN (BERJAYA)
N16	Kundasang	Amari Ginggor	BN (BERJAYA)
N17	Ranau	Jirin Saliun	BN (BERJAYA)
N18	Tambunan	Joseph Pairin Kitingan recontest, won on 29 December 1984	BN (BERJAYA)
N18	Tambunan	Joseph Pairin Kitingan recontest, won on 29 December 1984	IND
N19	Likas	Chin Kok Kong	BN (BERJAYA)
N20	Kota Kinabalu	Lim Guan Sing	BN (BERJAYA)
N21	Tanjong Aru	Paul Wong @ Wong Kau Chai Sindin	BN (BERJAYA)
N22	Inanam	Marcel Leiking	BN (BERJAYA)
N23	Moyog	Conrad Mojuntin	BN (BERJAYA)
N24	Kawang	Fred Sinidol @ Tokudung	BN (BERJAYA)
N25	Elopura	Yap Pak Leong	BN (BERJAYA)
N26	Bandar Sandakan	Stephen Wong Soon Yu	BN (BERJAYA)
N27	Karamunting	Lau Pui Keong	BN (BERJAYA)
N28	Sekong	Mohammad Jifli	BN (BERJAYA)
N29	Kuala Kinabatangan	Kolnah Sahih	BN (BERJAYA)
N30	Kuamut	Abdul Malek Chua	BN (BERJAYA)
N31	Papar	Mohd. Saidi Lampoh	BN (BERJAYA)
N32	Bongawan	Abdul Hamid Kanizaman	BN (BERJAYA)
N33	Kuala Penyu	Rashiddin Hatt Bulanggung	BN (BERJAYA)
N34	Labuan	Jamal Nordin	BN (BERJAYA)
N35	Klias	Mohammad Taufeck Asneh	BN (BERJAYA)
N36	Lumadan	Johari Mohamed Dun from 8 November 1981	BN (BERJAYA)
N36	Lumadan	Mohamed Dun Banir until 1981	BN (BERJAYA)
N37	Bingkor	Ayub Aman	BN (BERJAYA)
N38	Sook	Suffian Koroh	BN (BERJAYA)
N39	Pensiangan	Eric Thomas Koroh	BN (BERJAYA)
N40	Lahad Datu	Mohamed Sunoh Marso	BN (BERJAYA)
N41	Kunak	Salim Bacho from 8 November 1981	USNO
N41	Kunak	Abdul Hamid Mustapha until 1981	BN (BERJAYA)
N42	Semporna	Sakaran Dandai	BN (BERJAYA)
N43	Tenom	Harris Salleh	BN (BERJAYA)
N44	Sipitang	Ramli Dua	BN (BERJAYA)
N45	Kemabong	Justin Sanggau	BN (BERJAYA)
N46	Merotai	Abdul Ghapur Salleh	BN (BERJAYA)
N47	Balung	Ahmad Bahrom Abu Bakar Titingan from 8 November 1981	BN (BERJAYA)
N47	Balung	S. Abas S. Ali until 1981	BN (BERJAYA)
N48	Bandar Tawau	Chan Tze Hiang	PCBS

== Sarawak ==
=== 1979–1983 ===
No.	State Constituency	Member	Party
BN 45 | IND 3
N01	Lundu	Chong Kim Mook	BN (SUPP)
N02	Tasik Biru	Patrick Uren	IND
N03	Padungan	Tan Meng Chong	IND
N04	Stampin	Sim Kheng Hong	BN (SUPP)
N05	Petra Jaya	Hafsah Harun	BN (PBB)
N06	Satok	Abang Abdul Rahman Zohari Abang Openg from 23 May 1981	BN (PBB)
N06	Satok	Abang Abu Bakar Abang Mustapha until 1981	BN (PBB)
N07	Sebandi	Abdul Taib Mahmud from 25 March 1981	BN (PBB)
N07	Sebandi	Sharifah Mordiah Tuanku Fauzi until 1981	BN (PBB)
N08	Muara Tuang	Adenan Satem	BN (PBB)
N09	Batu Kawah	Chong Kiun Kong	BN (SUPP)
N10	Bengoh	Stephen Yong Kuet Tze until 1982	BN (SUPP)
N10	Bengoh	William Tanyuh Nub from August 1982	BN (SUPP)
N11	Tarat	Robert Jacob Ridu	BN (PBB)
N12	Tebakang	Michael Ben Panggi	BN (SNAP)
N13	Semera	Abang Ahmad Urai Abang Mohideen	BN (PBB)
N14	Gedong	Mohammad Tawan Abdullah @ Hilary Tawan Masan	BN (PBB)
N15	Lingga	Daniel Tajem Miri	BN (SNAP)
N16	Sri Aman	Hollis Tini	BN (SUPP)
N17	Engkilili	Jonathan Narwin from 1982	BN (SNAP)
N17	Engkilili	Nadeng Linggoh until 1982	BN (SNAP)
N18	Batang Ai	Mikai Mandau from 1982	IND
N18	Batang Ai	David Jemut until 1982	BN (SNAP)
N19	Saribas	Zainuddin Satem	BN (PBB)
N20	Layar	Alfred Jabu Numpang	BN (PBB)
N21	Kalaka	Wan Yusof Tuanku Bujang	BN (PBB)
N22	Krian	Dunstan Endawie Enchana	BN (SNAP)
N23	Kuala Rajang	Mohamad Asfia Awang Nasar	BN (PBB)
N24	Matu-Daro	from 23 May 1981	BN (PBB)
N24	Matu-Daro	Abdul Rahman Ya'kub until 1981	BN (PBB)
N25	Repok	Law Hieng Ding	BN (SUPP)
N26	Meradong	Thomas Hii King Hiong	BN (SUPP)
N27	Maling	Wong Soon Kai	BN (SUPP)
N28	Seduan	Ting Ing Mieng	BN (SUPP)
N29	Igan	David Tiong Chiong Chu	BN (SUPP)
N30	Dudong	Sandah Jarrow	BN (SNAP)
N31	Balingian	Wan Habib Syed Mahmud	BN (PBB)
N32	Oya	Salleh Jafaruddin from 28 January 1980	BN (PBB)
N32	Oya	Edwin Esnen Unang until 31 December 1979	BN (PBB)
N33	Pakan	Jawie Wilson Masing	BN (SNAP)
N34	Meluan	Gramong Jelian	BN (SNAP)
N35	Machan	Gramong Juna	BN (SNAP)
N36	Ngemah	Joseph Kudi	BN (SNAP)
N37	Katibas	Ambrose Blikau Enturan	BN (PBB)
N38	Pelagus	Jonathan Sabai Ajing	BN (SNAP)
N39	Baleh	Peter Gani Kiai	BN (SNAP)
N40	Belaga	Tajang Laing	IND
N41	Tatau	Joseph Mamat Samuel	BN (SNAP)
N42	Kemena	Celestine Ujang Jilan	BN (PBB)
N43	Subis	Mumin Kader	BN (PBB)
N44	Miri	Chia Chin Shin	BN (SUPP)
N45	Marudi	Edward Jeli Belayong	BN (SNAP)
N46	Telang Usan	Joseph Balan Seling	BN (SNAP)
N47	Limbang	James Wong Kim Min	BN (SNAP)
N48	Lawas	Noor Tahir	BN (PBB)
