= List of Malaysian State Assembly Representatives (1982–1986) =

Subnational legislature representatives

List of Malaysian State Assembly Representatives (1978–1982)
List of Malaysian State Assembly Representatives (1982–1986)
List of Malaysian State Assembly Representatives (1986–1990)

The following are the members of the Dewan Undangan Negeri or state assemblies, elected in the 1982 state election and by-elections. Also included is the list of the Sabah and Sarawak state assembly members who were elected in 1985 and 1983 respectively.

== Perlis ==
| No. | State Constituency | Member | Party |
|---|---|---|---|
BN 11 | PAS 1
| N01 | Titi Tinggi | Ng Eng Toon @ Goh Eng Toon | BN (MCA) |
| N02 | Chuping | Shaari Jusoh | BN (UMNO) |
| N03 | Bintong | Shuib Mohamad | PAS |
| N04 | Bandar Kangar | Lee Kim Cheng | BN (MCA) |
| N05 | Paya | Taib Ismail | BN (UMNO) |
| N06 | Oran | Ali Ahmad | BN (UMNO) |
| N07 | Kuala Perlis | Ahmad Osman | BN (UMNO) |
| N08 | Kayang | Talib Ali | BN (UMNO) |
| N09 | Utan Aji | Idrus Kassim | BN (UMNO) |
| N10 | Bandar Arau | Syed Ahmad Syed Alwi | BN (UMNO) |
| N11 | Kurong Anai | Abu Bakar Ahmad | BN (UMNO) |
| N12 | Sanglang | Saad @ Md Zain Hamzah | BN (UMNO) |

== Kedah ==
| No. | State Constituency | Member | Party |
|---|---|---|---|
BN 24 | PAS 2
| N01 | Langkawi | Syed Nahar Syed Sheh Shahabudin | BN (UMNO) |
| N02 | Jerlun | Yusuf Abdul Rahman | BN (UMNO) |
| N03 | Tunjang | Hanafi Ramli | BN (UMNO) |
| N04 | Jitra | Osman @ Mohd Daud Aroff | BN (UMNO) |
| N05 | Kuala Nerang | Azizah Taib | BN (UMNO) |
| N06 | Pokok Sena | Hamid Tahir | BN (UMNO) |
| N07 | Anak Bukit | Zakaria Said | BN (UMNO) |
| N08 | Pengkalan Kundor | Jamaluddin Lebai Bakar | BN (UMNO) |
| N09 | Alor Merah | Khalid Abdullah | BN (UMNO) |
| N10 | Bandar Alor Setar | Cheah Chong Chiew | BN (MCA) |
| N11 | Langgar-Limbong | Said Yassin | PAS |
| N12 | Bukit Raya | Fadzil Noor | PAS |
| N13 | Sik | Mohamed Noh Ahmad | BN (UMNO) |
| N14 | Pendang | Shaari Abu Bakar | BN (UMNO) |
| N15 | Bayu | Raja Ariffin Raja Sulaiman | BN (UMNO) |
| N16 | Kupang | Zainal Mat Isa | BN (UMNO) |
| N17 | Sala | Ahmad Awang | BN (UMNO) |
| N18 | Yan | Abdullah Ismail | BN (UMNO) |
| N19 | Jeniang | Zainol Abidin Johari | BN (UMNO) |
| N20 | Merbok | Hashim Osman | BN (UMNO) |
| N21 | Tikam Batu | Ong Chow Song | BN (Gerakan) |
| N22 | Kuala Ketil | S. Subramaniam | BN (MIC) |
| N23 | Lunas | Sang Chok Seong | BN (MCA) |
| N24 | Merbau Pulas | Mahmud Mohamad Zain | BN (UMNO) |
| N25 | Kulim | Yong Pau Chak | BN (MCA) |
| N26 | Serdang | Abdul Majid Itam | BN (UMNO) |

== Kelantan ==
| No. | State Constituency | Member | Party |
|---|---|---|---|
BN 26 | PAS 10
| N01 | Simpangan | Tahir Abdul Aziz | BN (BERJASA) |
| N02 | Sungei Pinang | Tengku Noor Asiah Tengku Ahmad | BN (UMNO) |
| N03 | Wakaf Bharu | Omar Awang Kechik | BN (UMNO) |
| N04 | Semut Api | Wan Mamat Wan Yusoff | PAS |
| N05 | Kemumin | Umar Ibrahim from 8 September 1983 | BN (BERJASA) |
| N05 | Kemumin | Che Hassan Che Ishak until 1983 | PAS |
| N06 | Sering | Daud Ibrahim | PAS |
| N07 | Tendong | Abdul Ghani Mahmud | BN (BERJASA) |
| N08 | Meranti | Nik Man Nik Mohamed | PAS |
| N09 | Bandar Pasir Mas | Mohamad Hassan Che Wil @ Hassan Ismail | BN (UMNO) |
| N10 | Sungei Keladi | Foo Chow Yong @ Foo Hong Sang | BN (MCA) |
| N11 | Telipot | Ahmad Rastom Ahmad Maher | BN (UMNO) |
| N12 | Kubang Kerian | Mohamad Asri Muda | PAS |
| N13 | Tawang | Idris Ahmad | PAS |
| N14 | Perupok | Mohamed Nor Awang | PAS |
| N15 | Jelawat | Mohamad Hassan | BN (UMNO) |
| N16 | Gual Periok | Zakaria Boto | BN (UMNO) |
| N17 | Lemal | Abdul Fatah Harun | PAS |
| N18 | Tok Uban | Daud Yatimee Ahmad | BN (BERJASA) |
| N19 | Salor | Mustapha Ibrahim | PAS |
| N20 | Ketereh | Ariffin Mahmud | BN (UMNO) |
| N21 | Peringat | Wan Hashim Wan Ahmad | BN (BERJASA) |
| N22 | Bukit Panau | Abdul Latif Abdul Rahman | BN (UMNO) |
| N23 | Lanas | Mohamed Yaacob | BN (UMNO) |
| N24 | Gual Ipoh | Mustafa Yaakub | BN (UMNO) |
| N25 | Pulai Chondong | Abdullah Mohamed | BN (UMNO) |
| N26 | Bandar Machang | Ibrahim Mohamed | BN (UMNO) |
| N27 | Sungei Rasau | Yahaya Yusoff | BN (UMNO) |
| N28 | Bandar Pasir Puteh | Raja Mahmud Raja Mamat | BN (UMNO) |
| N29 | Cherang Ruku | Jailani Jaafar | BN (UMNO) |
| N30 | Selising | Wan Mohamed Wan Abu Bakar from 8 September 1983 | BN (UMNO) |
| N30 | Selising | Abdul Rahman Ahmad until 1983 | PAS |
| N31 | Temangan | Salleh Che Harun | BN (UMNO) |
| N32 | Guchil | Mohamad Isa | BN (UMNO) |
| N33 | Pahi | Abdul Aziz Talib | BN (UMNO) |
| N34 | Jeli | Abdul Samad Drahman | BN (UMNO) |
| N35 | Gua Musang | Abdul Ghani Abu Bakar | BN (UMNO) |
| N36 | Manek Urai | Ariffin Said | BN (UMNO) |

== Trengganu ==
| No. | State Constituency | Member | Party |
|---|---|---|---|
BN 23 | PAS 5
| N01 | Kuala Besut | Wan Zakaria Wan Abd. Rahman | BN (UMNO) |
| N02 | Kampong Raja | Abdullah Muhammad | BN (UMNO) |
| N03 | Bukit Kenak | Hassan Said | BN (UMNO) |
| N04 | Ulu Besut | Hussein Abdullah | BN (UMNO) |
| N05 | Setiu | Tengku Mahmud Tengku Mansoor | BN (UMNO) |
| N06 | Langkap | Salleh Mohamed | BN (UMNO) |
| N07 | Batu Rakit | Wan Ibrahim Wan Othman | BN (UMNO) |
| N08 | Seberang Takir | Abdul Rashid Ngah | BN (UMNO) |
| N09 | Telemung | Ahmad Sidi Ismail | BN (UMNO) |
| N10 | Binjai | Muda Mamat from 9 November 1982 | BN (UMNO) |
| N10 | Binjai | Mohamed Nor Ali until 1982 | BN (UMNO) |
| N11 | Tanggol | Mustafa Muda | BN (UMNO) |
| N12 | Kuala Brang | Wan Muda Mohamed | BN (UMNO) |
| N13 | Jeram | Abu Bakar Chik | PAS |
| N14 | Bukit Tunggal | Ahmad Kassim Sudut | BN (UMNO) |
| N15 | Manir | Harun Taib | PAS |
| N16 | Bukit Payong | Abdul Razak Taib | BN (UMNO) |
| N17 | Bandar | Tok Teng Sai | BN (MCA) |
| N18 | Ladang | Abu Bakar Daud | BN (UMNO) |
| N19 | Wakaf Mempelam | Mustafa @ Hassan Ali | PAS |
| N20 | Batu Burok | Wan Abd Muttalib @ Wan Musa Embong | PAS |
| N21 | Marang | Abdul Hadi Awang | PAS |
| N22 | Merchang | Harun Ali | BN (UMNO) |
| N23 | Sura | Othman Omar | BN (UMNO) |
| N24 | Jerangau | Muda Abdullah | BN (UMNO) |
| N25 | Paka | Syed Omar Mohamed | BN (UMNO) |
| N26 | Kemasek | Wan Adnan Wan Ismail | BN (UMNO) |
| N27 | Bukit Bandi | Ismail Al-Falah Salleh | BN (UMNO) |
| N28 | Chukai | Wan Mokhtar Ahmad | BN (UMNO) |

== Penang ==
| No. | State Constituency | Member | Party |
|---|---|---|---|
BN 25 | DAP 2
| N01 | Penaga | Hassan Mohd. Noh | BN (UMNO) |
| N02 | Bertam | Abdul Rahman Abbas | BN (UMNO) |
| N03 | Tasek Gelugor | Mohamed Noor Ahmad | BN (UMNO) |
| N04 | Bagan Ajam | Mohd Yusoff Salleh | BN (UMNO) |
| N05 | Bagan Jermal | Sak Cheng Lum | BN (MCA) |
| N06 | Bagan Dalam | T. Subbiah | BN (MIC) |
| N07 | Sungai Dua | Mohd Shariff Omar | BN (UMNO) |
| N08 | Kubang Semang | Adnan Ramli | BN (UMNO) |
| N09 | Penanti | Yusoff Helmi Shafie | BN (UMNO) |
| N10 | Bukit Tengah | Liang Thau Sang | BN (Gerakan) |
| N11 | Pekan Bukit Mertajam | Song Ban Kheng | BN (MCA) |
| N12 | Machang Bubok | Lim Heng Tee | BN (Gerakan) |
| N13 | Bukit Tambun | Khoo Soo Kheng | BN (MCA) |
| N14 | Sungai Bakap | Teoh Kooi Sneah | BN (Gerakan) |
| N15 | Sungai Acheh | Ahmad Salleh | BN (UMNO) |
| N16 | Telok Bahang | Yahaya Ahmad | BN (UMNO) |
| N17 | Sungai Nibong | Tan Chong Teik | BN (Gerakan) |
| N18 | Bayan Lepas | Mohd Zain Omar | BN (UMNO) |
| N19 | Tanjong Bunga | Khoo Gark Kim | BN (Gerakan) |
| N20 | Ayer Itam | Lee Jong Ki | BN (MCA) |
| N21 | Paya Terubong | Chin Nyok Soo | BN (MCA) |
| N22 | Padang Kota | Lim Chong Eu | BN (Gerakan) |
| N23 | Kampong Kolam | Wong Hoong Keat | BN (MCA) |
| N24 | Pengkalan Kota | Teoh Teik Huat | DAP |
| N25 | Datok Keramat | Teh Ewe Lim | BN (Gerakan) |
| N26 | Sungai Pinang | Ong Hean Tee | BN (Gerakan) |
| N27 | Bukit Gelugor | Karpal Singh | DAP |

== Perak ==
| No. | State Constituency | Member | Party |
|---|---|---|---|
BN 38 | DAP 4
| N01 | Temengor | Shamsuddin Din | BN (UMNO) |
| N02 | Kenering | Johan Lahamat from 9 April 1983 | BN (UMNO) |
| N02 | Kenering | Wan Mohamed Wan Teh until 1983 | BN (UMNO) |
| N03 | Selama | Abdul Haqq @ Abdul Aziz Ahmad | BN (UMNO) |
| N04 | Batu Kurau | Abdul Manan Mohamed Ali | BN (UMNO) |
| N05 | Simpang Lima | Mohamed Talib Hanapiah | BN (UMNO) |
| N06 | Kuala Kurau | Shaarani Mohamed | BN (UMNO) |
| N07 | Alor Pongsu | Mohamed Abas | BN (UMNO) |
| N08 | Gunong Semanggol | Shamsuddin Man | BN (UMNO) |
| N09 | Lintang | Meor Osman Pinawa @ Panjang Mohamed Hanapiah | BN (UMNO) |
| N10 | Jalong | Lim Keng Yaik | BN (Gerakan) |
| N11 | Kamunting | Abdul Khalid Mohamed Nasir | BN (UMNO) |
| N12 | Klian Pauh | Siew Kok Kan | BN (Gerakan) |
| N13 | Changkat Jering | Cheong Kai Foo | BN (Gerakan) |
| N14 | Bukit Gantang | Hashim Ghazali | BN (UMNO) |
| N15 | Lenggong | Umar Ismail | BN (UMNO) |
| N16 | Lubok Merbau | Mior Aris Mior Abu Bakar | BN (UMNO) |
| N17 | Bukit Chandan | Shaari Mohamed Noor | BN (UMNO) |
| N18 | Manong | Shafie Mohamed Saman | BN (UMNO) |
| N19 | Chemor | Chin Kee Seong | BN (MCA) |
| N20 | Gopeng | Loke Yuen Yow | BN (MCA) |
| N21 | Guntong | Chin Yoong Fee | BN (MCA) |
| N22 | Kepayang | Lau Dak Kee from 16 October 1982 | DAP |
| N22 | Kepayang | Lim Cho Hock until 1982 | DAP |
| N23 | Pasir Puteh | Liew Yoon Sin | BN (MCA) |
| N24 | Kuala Pari | Wu Lian Hwa | BN (MCA) |
| N25 | Pengkalan Baharu | Abdul Malik Ahmad | BN (UMNO) |
| N26 | Pantai Remis | Yu Yang Kien | DAP |
| N27 | Belanja | Ahmad Azizuddin Zainal Abidin | BN (UMNO) |
| N28 | Bota | Rokiah Kayat | BN (UMNO) |
| N29 | Tanjong Tualang | Tan Tiew Bok | BN (MCA) |
| N30 | Kampar | Ang Kok Yeang | BN (MCA) |
| N31 | Tapah | Lee Soon Heng @ Lee Chai Fan | BN (MCA) |
| N32 | Chenderiang | Look Kuan @ Look Kok Kong | BN (MCA) |
| N33 | Sitiawan | Rajasegaran Samy Nathan | BN (MIC) |
| N34 | Pangkor | Ting Chek Ming | DAP |
| N35 | Kampong Gajah | Ramli Ngah Talib | BN (UMNO) |
| N36 | Sungei Manik | Mohamed Yusof Maidin | BN (UMNO) |
| N37 | Pasir Bedamar | Fadzlan Yahya | DAP |
| N38 | Changkat Jong | Mohamed Arshad Abdullah | BN (UMNO) |
| N39 | Bidor | Seng Yong Pheow | BN (MCA) |
| N40 | Slim | Dzulkarnain Abdul Rahman | BN (UMNO) |
| N41 | Rungkup | Mohamed Jamrah from 3 December 1983 | BN (UMNO) |
| N41 | Rungkup | Mohamed Yaacob Mohamed until 1983 | BN (UMNO) |
| N42 | Hutan Melintang | Mahwany @ Radziah Marahuddin | BN (UMNO) |

== Pahang ==
| No. | State Constituency | Member | Party |
|---|---|---|---|
BN 31 | DAP 1
| N01 | Jelai | Mohamed Hashim Idrus | BN (UMNO) |
| N02 | Tanah Rata | Sangaralingam Muthu Muthaya | BN (MIC) |
| N03 | Bukit Betong | Abdullah Sulaiman | BN (UMNO) |
| N04 | Bandar Lipis | Chin Hon Kit | BN (MCA) |
| N05 | Benta | Zuki Kamaluddin | BN (UMNO) |
| N06 | Tahan | Armia Abdullah | BN (UMNO) |
| N07 | Tembeling | Kamariah Mat Noh | BN (UMNO) |
| N08 | Jenderak | Abdullah Hashim Mohamed Ali | BN (UMNO) |
| N09 | Bandar Jerantut | Ho Chock Keong | BN (MCA) |
| N10 | Kerdau | Abdullah Kia | BN (UMNO) |
| N11 | Beserah | Latifah Abdul Ghaffar | BN (UMNO) |
| N12 | Sungai Lembing | Wan Abdullah Wan Osman | BN (UMNO) |
| N13 | Bandar Kuantan | Lim Ah Lek @ Lim Mok Siang | BN (MCA) |
| N14 | Batu Talam | Abdul Razak Hitam | BN (UMNO) |
| N15 | Dong | Tengku Mustapha Tengku Seti | BN (UMNO) |
| N16 | Bandar Raub | Lip Tuck Chee from 4 June 1983 | DAP |
| N16 | Bandar Raub | Tan Liew Thong until 1983 | BN (MCA) |
| N17 | Paya Besar | Abdul Rashid Abdul Rahman | BN (UMNO) |
| N18 | Bandar Maran | Abd. Jalil Mohd. Seh | BN (UMNO) |
| N18 | Bandar Maran | Ayub Teh from 4 January 1986 | BN (UMNO) |
| N19 | Jengka | Zainal Hassan | BN (UMNO) |
| N20 | Chenor | Mahmud Mat Taib | BN (UMNO) |
| N21 | Karak | Chan Tan Chuan | BN (Gerakan) |
| N22 | Bandar Bentong | Fu Ah Kow @ Poo Yew Choy | BN (MCA) |
| N23 | Semantan | Abdul Malek Mohamed | BN (UMNO) |
| N24 | Kuala Pahang | Hashim Mohamed Zin | BN (UMNO) |
| N25 | Chini | Wan Mohamed Razali Wan Mahussin | BN (UMNO) |
| N26 | Bandar Pekan | Najib Razak | BN (UMNO) |
| N27 | Bukit Ibam | Abdul Jabbar Ibrahim | BN (UMNO) |
| N28 | Rompin | Hasan Arifin | BN (UMNO) |
| N29 | Mentekab | Abdul Aziz Rahman | BN (UMNO) |
| N30 | Bera | Zulkefly Awang | BN (UMNO) |
| N31 | Triang | Lim Ong Hang | DAP |
| N32 | Bandar Temerloh | Abdullah Mohammed | BN (UMNO) |

== Selangor ==
| No. | State Constituency | Member | Party |
|---|---|---|---|
BN 31 | DAP 1 | IND 1
| N01 | Sungei Ayer Tawar | Zainal Dahlan | BN (UMNO) |
| N02 | Sabak | Mohamad Yusof Abdul Latif | BN (UMNO) |
| N03 | Sungei Besar | Mohamed Ghazali Kantan | BN (UMNO) |
| N04 | Sungei Panjang | Ariffin Mat Rawi | BN (UMNO) |
| N05 | Sekinchan | Tan Kui Sui @ Tan Kai See | BN (MCA) |
| N06 | Sungei Burong | Abdul Shukur Siraj | BN (UMNO) |
| N07 | Kalumpang | Ramli Abdul Rahman | BN (UMNO) |
| N08 | Kuala Kubu Baru | Choo Yong Fatt | BN (MCA) |
| N09 | Batang Kali | Muhammad Muhammad Taib | BN (UMNO) |
| N10 | Permatang | Khalid Ahmad | BN (UMNO) |
| N11 | Asam Jawa | M. Mahalingam | BN (MIC) |
| N12 | Jeram | Miskon Sutero | BN (UMNO) |
| N13 | Rawang | Tang See Hang | BN (MCA) |
| N14 | Gombak | Saidin Thamby | BN (UMNO) |
| N15 | Ampang | Ahmad Razali Mohamad Ali | BN (UMNO) |
| N16 | Dusun Tua | Mohamad Fahmi Ibrahim | BN (UMNO) |
| N17 | Kajang | Lim Ann Koon | BN (MCA) |
| N18 | Semenyih | Marwilis Yusof | BN (UMNO) |
| N19 | Kapar | Sanad Said | BN (UMNO) |
| N20 | Sementa | Onn Ismail | BN (UMNO) |
| N21 | Selat Kelang | Ng Boon Thong @ Ng Thian Hock | BN (MCA) |
| N22 | Bukit Raja | S. S. Subramaniam | BN (MIC) |
| N23 | Bandar Kelang | Tan Seng Giaw | DAP |
| N24 | Kampong Jawa | Mohammed Zin Sulaiman | BN (UMNO) |
| N25 | Petaling Jaya | Soong Siew Hoong | BN (Gerakan) |
| N26 | Sungei Way | Mazlan Harun | BN (UMNO) |
| N27 | Serdang | Yap Pian Hon | BN (MCA) |
| N28 | Panglima Garang | Tarikh Junid | BN (UMNO) |
| N29 | Banting | Fatimah Suhaimi | BN (UMNO) |
| N30 | Morib | Abu Bakar Abdul Hamid | BN (UMNO) |
| N31 | Dengkil | T. M. Thurai | BN (MIC) |
| N32 | Sungei Pelek | Ng Soon Por @ Ng Ah Hock | BN (MCA) |
| N33 | Batu Laut | Abdul Jabar Mohamed Yusof | IND |

== Negri Sembilan ==
| No. | State Constituency | Member | Party |
|---|---|---|---|
BN 22 | DAP 2
| N01 | Kuala Klawang | Wong See Wah | BN (MCA) |
| N02 | Pertang | Abdul Kadir Kassim | BN (UMNO) |
| N03 | Bahau | Chew Hock Thye | BN (MCA) |
| N04 | Jempol | Mohamed Khalid Mohamed Yunus | BN (UMNO) |
| N05 | Lenggeng | Gan Kong Seng | BN (MCA) |
| N06 | Pantai | Khatimah Ibrahim | BN (UMNO) |
| N07 | Labu | Shahardin Hashim | BN (UMNO) |
| N08 | Rantau | Ismail Lebai Kamat | BN (UMNO) |
| N09 | Rasah | M. Kuppusamy | DAP |
| N10 | Rahang | Hu Sepang | DAP |
| N11 | Sungei Ujong | Oh Her Sang | BN (MCA) |
| N12 | Terentang | Yazid Baba | BN (UMNO) |
| N13 | Sri Menanti | Ahmad Kasim | BN (UMNO) |
| N14 | Ulu Muar | Ali Manaf | BN (UMNO) |
| N15 | Pilah | Ramli Ujang | BN (UMNO) |
| N16 | Johol | Ishak Mohamed Yusof | BN (UMNO) |
| N17 | Jimah | Yap Ah Peng | BN (MCA) |
| N18 | Si Rusa | Muthupalaniappan @ Mani Muthuraman Chettiar | BN (MIC) |
| N19 | Pasir Panjang | Mustaffa Hassan | BN (UMNO) |
| N20 | Linggi | Mohd Isa Abdul Samad | BN (UMNO) |
| N21 | Kota | Ismail Yassin | BN (UMNO) |
| N22 | Gemencheh | Waad Mansor from 22 May 1982 | BN (UMNO) |
| N23 | Gemas | Mohamed Salleh Mohamed Hashim | BN (UMNO) |
| N24 | Rompin | Yee Kok Ching | BN (MCA) |

== Malacca ==
| No. | State Constituency | Member | Party |
|---|---|---|---|
BN 18 | DAP 2
| N01 | Taboh Naning | Abdul Razak Alias | BN (UMNO) |
| N02 | Sungei Bahru | Mohamed Jais | BN (UMNO) |
| N03 | Machap | Ng Kim Fong | BN (MCA) |
| N04 | Kelemak | Abdul Rahim Thamby Chik | BN (UMNO) |
| N05 | Masjid Tanah | Idris Ghani | BN (UMNO) |
| N06 | Batang Melaka | Lim Soo Kiang | BN (MCA) |
| N07 | Nyalas | Abdul Aziz Tapa | BN (UMNO) |
| N08 | Ayer Panas | Mat Aris Konil | BN (UMNO) |
| N09 | Serkam | Nawawi Ahmad | BN (UMNO) |
| N10 | Sungei Rambai | Ahmad Ithnin | BN (UMNO) |
| N11 | Tanjong Minyak | Ahmad Abdullah | BN (UMNO) |
| N12 | Ayer Keroh | Samad Kassim | BN (UMNO) |
| N13 | Ayer Molek | Mohd. Tamrin Abdul Ghafar | BN (UMNO) |
| N14 | Sungei Udang | Ahmad Nordin Mohd Amin | BN (UMNO) |
| N15 | Bukit Rambai | Fatimah Ahmad | BN (UMNO) |
| N16 | Peringgit | Tee Cheng Yok | BN (MCA) |
| N17 | Tranquerah | Ng Peng Hay | BN (MCA) |
| N18 | Kubu | Yong Wee Yook | DAP |
| N19 | Durian Daun | Lai Keun Ban | DAP |
| N20 | Bandar Hilir | Gan Boon Leong | BN (MCA) |

== Johore ==
| No. | State Constituency | Member | Party |
|---|---|---|---|
BN 32
| N01 | Buloh Kasap | V. Arumugam | BN (MIC) |
| N02 | Ayer Panas | Law Lai Heng | BN (MCA) |
| N03 | Bandar Segamat | Lim Si Cheng | BN (MCA) |
| N04 | Bukit Serampang | Zakaria Salleh | BN (UMNO) |
| N05 | Bekok | Siaw Siew Bee | BN (MCA) |
| N06 | Bandar Kluang | Kang Chow Oh | BN (MCA) |
| N07 | Endau | Abdul Ajib Ahmad | BN (UMNO) |
| N08 | Mersing | Lim Ik Kim | BN (MCA) |
| N09 | Tangkak | Lim Tong Keng | BN (MCA) |
| N10 | Serom | Mohd. Nor Mohd. Dom | BN (UMNO) |
| N11 | Jorak | Abdul Rahman Mahmud | BN (UMNO) |
| N12 | Kesang | Sabariah Ahmad | BN (UMNO) |
| N13 | Sri Lalang | Sim Geok Peak | BN (MCA) |
| N14 | Sri Medan | Kamisan Shaari | BN (UMNO) |
| N15 | Bandar Maharani | Musa Ismail | BN (UMNO) |
| N16 | Parit Jawa | Mohd Salleh Kasmin | BN (UMNO) |
| N17 | Layang-Layang | Law Boon King @ Low Boon Hong | BN (MCA) |
| N18 | Kulai | Khoo Che Wat | BN (Gerakan) |
| N19 | Kota Tinggi | Yusof Malim Kuning | BN (UMNO) |
| N20 | Johore Lama | Atashah Majid | BN (UMNO) |
| N21 | Parit Raja | Sharif Lassim | BN (UMNO) |
| N22 | Simpang Rengam | Syed Zain Edros Al-Shahab | BN (UMNO) |
| N23 | Sri Menanti | Mohd Sham Sailan | BN (UMNO) |
| N24 | Peserai | Ridwan Salim Bilal | BN (UMNO) |
| N25 | Bandar Penggaram | Tan Peng Khoon | BN (MCA) |
| N26 | Rengit | Abdul Jalal Abu Bakar | BN (UMNO) |
| N27 | Benut | Hasmuni Salim | BN (UMNO) |
| N28 | Kukup | Ahmad Abdullah | BN (UMNO) |
| N29 | Gelang Patah | Mohd. Yunus Sulaiman | BN (UMNO) |
| N30 | Skudai | Mahmud Daud | BN (UMNO) |
| N31 | Tiram | Ali Hassan | BN (UMNO) |
| N32 | Tanjong Petri | Woon See Chin | BN (MCA) |

== Sabah ==
=== 1985–1986 ===
| No. | State Constituency | Member | Party |
|---|---|---|---|
PBS 25 | USNO 16 | BERJAYA 6 | PASOK 1
| N01 | Banggi | Amir Kahar Mustapha | USNO |
| N02 | Kudat | Wong Phin Chung | PBS |
| N03 | Bengkoka | Abdul Salam Harun | USNO |
| N04 | Matunggong | Mathius Majihi | PBS |
| N05 | Tandek | Saibul Supu | PBS |
| N06 | Langkon | Bugie Galadam | PBS |
| N07 | Tempasuk | Yahya Lampong | USNO |
| N08 | Usukan | Mustapha Harun | USNO |
| N09 | Kadamaian | Banggai Basirun | PBS |
| N10 | Tamparuli | Wilfred Bumburing | PBS |
| N11 | Sulaman | Abdul Hamid Mustapha | USNO |
| N12 | Kiulu | Gisin Lombut | PBS |
| N13 | Kundasang | Ewon Ebin | PBS |
| N14 | Ranau | Mark Koding | PBS |
| N15 | Sugut | Ampong Puyon | USNO |
| N16 | Labuk | Tan Yung Hi @ Tan Yong Gee | PBS |
| N17 | Sungai Sibuga | Bernard Chu Thau Hien | PBS |
| N18 | Elopura | Tham Nyip Shen | PBS |
| N19 | Tanjong Papat | Tan Kit Sher | PBS |
| N20 | Karamunting | Lau Pui Keong recontest, won on 25 January 1986 | BN (BERJAYA) |
| N20 | Karamunting | Lau Pui Keong recontest, won on 25 January 1986 | PBS |
| N21 | Sekong | Pitting Mohamed Ali | USNO |
| N22 | Sukau | Zaki Gusmiah from 25 January 1986 | USNO |
| N22 | Sukau | Saman Gulam until 1986 | USNO |
| N23 | Kuamut | Abdul Malek Chua | BN (BERJAYA) |
| N24 | Tambunan | Joseph Pairin Kitingan | PBS |
| N25 | Bingkor | Uling Anggan @ Thomas | PBS |
| N26 | Moyog | Ignatius Stephen Malanjum | PASOK |
| N27 | Inanam | Stephen Kinson Kutai @ Joni Bilingan | PBS |
| N28 | Likas | Yong Teck Lee | PBS |
| N29 | Api-Api | Chau Tet On | PBS |
| N30 | Sembulan | Francis Leong Che Kiong | PBS |
| N31 | Petagas | James Andrew Vitales | PBS |
| N32 | Kawang | Wenche Lajingah | PBS |
| N33 | Buang Sayang | Osu Sukam from 25 January 1986 | USNO |
| N33 | Buang Sayang | Othman Mohamed Yassin until 1985 | USNO |
| N34 | Bongawan | Ibrahim Pengiran Dewa | USNO |
| N35 | Kuala Penyu | Johan Ghani | USNO |
| N36 | Klias | Azizah Mohd Dun | USNO |
| N37 | Lumadan | Dayang Mahani Pengiran Ahmad Raffae | USNO |
| N38 | Sipitang | Jawawi Isa | USNO |
| N39 | Tenom | Kadoh Agundong | PBS |
| N40 | Kemabong | Limun Laikim | PBS |
| N41 | Sook | Joseph Kurup | PBS |
| N42 | Nabawan | Adut Sigoh @ Joe Said Besar | PBS |
| N43 | Merotai | Abdul Ghapur Salleh | BN (BERJAYA) |
| N44 | Sri Tanjong | Hiew Min Kong | BN (BERJAYA) |
| N45 | Lahad Datu | Mohamed Sunoh Marso | BN (BERJAYA) |
| N46 | Kunak | Salim Bachu | USNO |
| N47 | Balung | Ahmad Bahrom Abu Bakar Titingan recontest, won on 25 January 1986 | BN (BERJAYA) |
| N47 | Balung | Ahmad Bahrom Abu Bakar Titingan recontest, won on 25 January 1986 | PBS |
| N48 | Sulabayan | Sakaran Dandai | USNO |

== Sarawak ==
=== 1983–1987 ===
| No. | State Constituency | Member | Party |
|---|---|---|---|
BN 30 | SNAP 8 | PBDS 6 | IND 4
| N01 | Lundu | Ramsay Noel Jitam | BN (SUPP) |
| N02 | Tasik Biru | Patau Rubis | SNAP |
| N03 | Padungan | Song Swee Guan | BN (SUPP) |
| N04 | Stampin | Sim Kheng Hong | BN (SUPP) |
| N05 | Petra Jaya | Hafsah Harun | BN (PBB) |
| N06 | Satok | Abang Abdul Rahman Zohari Abang Openg | BN (PBB) |
| N07 | Sebandi | Abdul Taib Mahmud | BN (PBB) |
| N08 | Muara Tuang | Adenan Satem | BN (PBB) |
| N09 | Batu Kawah | Chong Kiun Kong | BN (SUPP) |
| N10 | Bengoh | Wilfred Rata Nissom | IND |
| N11 | Tarat | Robert Jacob Ridu | BN (PBB) |
| N12 | Tebakang | Michael Ben Panggi | SNAP |
| N13 | Semera | Wan Abdul Wahab Wan Sanusi | BN (PBB) |
| N14 | Gedong | Mohammad Tawan Abdullah @ Hilary Tawan Masan | BN (PBB) |
| N15 | Lingga | Daniel Tajem Miri | PBDS |
| N16 | Sri Aman | Hollis Tini | BN (SUPP) |
| N17 | Engkilili | Sung Cho Nang @ Sim Choo Nam | IND |
| N18 | Batang Ai | Sylvester Langit Uming until 1 June 1986 | SNAP |
| N18 | Batang Ai | Mikai Mandau from 31 August 1986 | IND |
| N19 | Saribas | Zainuddin Satem | BN (PBB) |
| N20 | Layar | Alfred Jabu Numpang | BN (PBB) |
| N21 | Kalaka | Wan Yusof Tuanku Bujang | BN (PBB) |
| N22 | Krian | Edmund Langgu Saga | PBDS |
| N23 | Kuala Rajang | Saidi Olia | BN (PBB) |
| N24 | Matu-Daro | Abdul Wahab Dolah | BN (PBB) |
| N25 | Repok | David Teng Lung Chi | BN (SUPP) |
| N26 | Meradong | Thomas Hii King Hiong | BN (SUPP) |
| N27 | Maling | Wong Soon Kai | BN (SUPP) |
| N28 | Seduan | Ting Ing Mieng | BN (SUPP) |
| N29 | Igan | David Tiong Chiong Chu | BN (SUPP) |
| N30 | Dudong | Wilfred Kiroh Jeram | IND |
| N31 | Balingian | Wan Habib Syed Mahmud | BN (PBB) |
| N32 | Oya | Salleh Jafaruddin until 14th April 1986 | BN (PBB) |
| N32 | Oya | Wan Madzihi Wan Mahdzar from 2 July 1986 | BN (PBB) |
| N33 | Pakan | Jawie Wilson Masing | PBDS |
| N34 | Meluan | Geman Itam | SNAP |
| N35 | Machan | Gramong Juna | PBDS |
| N36 | Ngemah | Joseph Kudi | PBDS |
| N37 | Katibas | Ambrose Blikau Enturan | BN (PBB) |
| N38 | Pelagus | Nueng Kudi | SNAP |
| N39 | Baleh | James Jemut Masing | PBDS |
| N40 | Belaga | Tajang Laing | BN (PBB) |
| N41 | Tatau | Bolhassan Kambar | IND |
| N42 | Kemena | Celestine Ujang Jilan | BN (PBB) |
| N43 | Subis | Usop Wahab | BN (PBB) |
| N44 | Miri | George Chan Hong Nam | BN (SUPP) |
| N45 | Marudi | Edward Jeli Belayong | SNAP |
| N46 | Telang Usan | Joseph Balan Seling | SNAP |
| N47 | Limbang | James Wong Kim Min | SNAP |
| N48 | Lawas | Noor Tahir | BN (PBB) |
