= List of Malaysian State Assembly Representatives (1999–2004) =

Subnational legislature representatives

List of Malaysian State Assembly Representatives (1995–1999)
List of Malaysian State Assembly Representatives (1999–2004)
List of Malaysian State Assembly Representatives (2004–2008)

The following are the members of the Dewan Undangan Negeri or state assemblies, elected in the 1999 state election and by-elections. Also included is the list of the Sarawak state assembly members who were elected in 2001. During this period, then-Prime Minister Mahathir Mohamad voluntarily stepped down and retired in 2003.

== Perlis ==
No.	State Constituency	Member	Party
BN 12 | PAS 3
N01	Titi Tinggi	Loh Yoon Foo	BN (MCA)
N02	Beseri	Zahidi Zainul Abidin	BN (UMNO)
N03	Chuping	Yazid Mat	BN (UMNO)
N04	Mata Ayer	Ishak Arshad	BN (UMNO)
N05	Santan	Zolkharnain Abidin	BA (PAS)
N06	Bintong	Md Isa Sabu	BN (UMNO)
N07	Sena	Azihani Ali	BN (UMNO)
N08	Indera Kayangan	Oui Ah Lan @ Ng Ah Lan from 19 January 2002	BN (MCA)
N08	Indera Kayangan	Khor Lian Tee until 19 December 2001	BN (MCA)
N09	Kuala Perlis	Bakar Saad	BN (UMNO)
N10	Kayang	Mohamad Hadzi Nordin	BN (UMNO)
N11	Pauh	Abu Bakar Ismail	BN (UMNO)
N12	Tambun Tulang	Shahidan Kassim	BN (UMNO)
N13	Guar Sanji	Ahmad Ali	BA (PAS)
N14	Simpang Empat	Zahari Bakar	BN (UMNO)
N15	Sanglang	Hashim Jasin	BA (PAS)

== Kedah ==
10th Kedah State Legislative Assembly
←	9th Assembly	11th Assembly	→

Overview
- Legislative body: Kedah State Legislative Assembly
- Jurisdiction: Kedah
- Meeting place: Wisma Darul Aman, Alor Setar
- Term: 26 December 1999 – November 2003
- Election: 1999 state election
- Government: Kedah State Executive Council
- Website: mmk.kedah.gov.my
- Members: 36
- Speaker: Badruddin Amiruldin
- Deputy Speaker: Md Rozai Shafian
- Menteri Besar: Sanusi Junid (until 11 December 1999); Syed Razak Syed Zain Barakbah
- Opposition Leader: Fadzil Noor (until 23 June 2002); Azizan Abdul Razak
- Party control: Barisan Nasional

Sovereign
- Sultan: Sultan Abdul Halim Mu’adzam Shah

=== Elected members ===
No.	State Constituency	Member	Party
BN 23 | PAS 12 | keADILan 1
N01	Padang Matsirat	Md Hasan Bulat (EXCO Member)	BN (UMNO)
N02	Kuah	Sanusi Junid	BN (UMNO)
N03	Ayer Hitam	Abdul Ghani Ahmad	BA (PAS)
N04	Kota Siputeh	Abu Hasan Sarif	BN (UMNO)
N05	Tunjang	Barishah @ Habshah Saad	BN (UMNO)
N06	Jitra	Othman Ishak (EXCO Member)	BN (UMNO)
N07	Kuala Nerang	Mohamad Yusoff Zakaria	BA (PAS)
N08	Pedu	Wan Jaafar Wan Ahmad	BA (PAS)
N09	Bukit Lada	Ismail Kamis	BA (PAS)
N10	Langgar	Mohamad Shauki Ibrahim	BA (PAS)
N11	Tanjong Seri	Fadzil Hanafi (EXCO Member)	BN (UMNO)
N12	Derga	Cheung Khai Yan	BN (Gerakan)
N13	Kota Darul Aman	Chong Kau Chai @ Chong Itt Chew	BN (MCA)
N14	Alor Merah	Ahmad Bashah Md Hanipah (EXCO Member)	BN (UMNO)
N15	Anak Bukit	Amiruddin Hamzah from 18 July 2002	BA (PAS)
N15	Anak Bukit	Fadzil Noor until 23 June 2002	BA (PAS)
N16	Kubang Rotan	Syed Razak Syed Zain Barakbah (Menteri Besar)	BN (UMNO)
N17	Pengkalan Kundor	Phahrolrazi Zawawi	BA (PAS)
N18	Bukit Raya	Mohamed Taulan Mat Rasul	BA (PAS)
N19	Sungai Tiang	Md Rozai Shafian (Deputy Speaker)	BN (UMNO)
N20	Sala	Azizan Abdul Razak (Opposition Leader)	BA (PAS)
N21	Guar Chempedak	Abdul Razak Hashim	BN (UMNO)
N22	Belantek	Mohd Isa Shafie	BA (PAS)
N23	Jeneri	Yahya Abdullah	BA (PAS)
N24	Bukit Selambau	Saravanan Velia Udayar (EXCO Member)	BN (MIC)
N25	Gurun	Beh Heng Seong (EXCO Member)	BN (MCA)
N26	Tanjong Dawai	Rosnah Abd. Majid (EXCO Member)	BN (UMNO)
N27	Pantai Merdeka	Mat Akhair Shafie	BN (UMNO)
N28	Bakar Arang	Tan Hong Eng	BN (MCA)
N29	Sidam	Fong Chok Gin (EXCO Member)	BN (Gerakan)
N30	Bayu	Zainol Md Isa (EXCO Member)	BN (UMNO)
N31	Kupang	Suhaimi Ahmad	BA (PAS)
N32	Kuala Ketil	Mohd Hadzir Ismail	BN (UMNO)
N33	Merbau Pulas	Marlia Abd. Latiff	BN (UMNO)
N34	Lunas	Saifuddin Nasution Ismail from 29 November 2000	BA (KeADILan)
N34	Lunas	M Joseph Philomin Joseph Fernandez until 4 November 2000	BN (MIC)
N35	Kulim	Yong Pau Chak	BN (MCA)
N36	Bandar Baharu	Osman Md Aji (EXCO Member)	BN (UMNO)

=== Seating arrangement ===
N27 Pantai Merdeka	N32 Kuala Ketil	N28 Bakar Arang	N13 Kota Darul Aman		Vacant	Vacant	Vacant	Vacant
N33 Merbau Pulas	N21 Guar Chempedak	N35 Kulim	N02 Kuah		Vacant	Vacant	Vacant	Vacant
	N12 Derga	N07 Kuala Nerang	N08 Pedu		N14 Alor Merah (EXCO Member)	N06 Jitra (EXCO Member)	Vacant
		N23 Belantek	C		B	N11 Tanjong Seri (EXCO Member)
	N03 Kota Siputeh	N24 Jeneri	D	Sergeant-at-Arm	A	N24 Sidam (EXCO Member)	N19 Sungai Tiang (Deputy Speaker)
	N05 Tunjang	N04 Ayer Hitam	D		A	N25 Bukit Selambau (EXCO Member)	N26 Tanjong Dawai (EXCO Member)
	N15 Anak Bukit	N18 Bukit Raya	D	the Mace	A	N22 Gurun (EXCO Member)	N36 Bandar Baharu (EXCO Member)
	N34 Lunas	N10 Langgar	D	the Mace	A	N01 Padang Matsirat (EXCO Member)	State Financial Officer
	N31 Kupang	N17 Pengkalan Kundor	D		A	N30 Bayu (EXCO Member)	State Legal Advisor
	N09 Bukit Lada	N20 Sala (Opposition Leader)	D	Secretary	A	N16 Kubang Rotan (Menteri Besar)	State Secretary
				Speaker
				Sultan

== Kelantan ==
No.	State Constituency	Member	Party
PAS 41 | BN 2
N01	Pengkalan Kubor	Wan Husain Wan Ahmad	BA (PAS)
N02	Kelaboran	Noordin Yaakub	BA (PAS)
N03	Pasir Pekan	Ahmad Yaakob	BA (PAS)
N04	Kijang	Abdul Halim Abdul Rahman	BA (PAS)
N05	Chempaka	Nik Abdul Aziz Nik Mat	BA (PAS)
N06	Panchor	Mohd Yusoff Ludin	BA (PAS)
N07	Tanjong Mas	Wan Abdul Rahim Wan Abdullah	BA (PAS)
N08	Kota Lama	Anuar Tan Abdullah	BA (PAS)
N09	Bunut Payong	Takiyuddin Hassan	BA (PAS)
N10	Wakaf Bharu	Ramli Abu Bakar	BA (PAS)
N11	Tendong	Wan Othman Wan Yusoff	BA (PAS)
N12	Pengkalan Pasir	Hassan Abdullah	BA (PAS)
N13	Meranti	Mohd. Nassuruddin Daud	BA (PAS)
N14	Gual Periok	Abdullah Ab. Razak	BA (PAS)
N15	Bukit Tuku	Mohd Yusof Abdullah	BA (PAS)
N16	Salor	Buni Amin Hamzah	BA (PAS)
N17	Pasir Tumboh	Ahmad Baihaki Atiqullah	BA (PAS)
N18	Kenali	Mohamed Daud	BA (PAS)
N19	Tawang	Hassan Mohamood Junid	BA (PAS)
N20	Perupok	Omar Mohammed	BA (PAS)
N21	Jelawat	Shaary Awang	BA (PAS)
N22	Melor	Wan Ismail Wan Jusoh	BA (PAS)
N23	Kadok	Shamsudin @ Mohamed Shukri Ab. Rahman	BA (PAS)
N24	Ketereh	Md. Ashari Mamat	BA (PAS)
N25	Chetok	Hanafi Daud	BA (PAS)
N26	Bukit Panau	Mat Yusoff Mat Sah	BA (PAS)
N27	Gual Ipoh	Muhamad Kamil Harun	BA (PAS)
N28	Selising	Saipul Bahrin Mohamad	BA (PAS)
N29	Limbongan	Zainuddin Awang Hamat	BA (PAS)
N30	Semerak	Hussin Awang	BA (PAS)
N31	Gaal	Nik Mazian Nik Mohamad	BA (PAS)
N32	Pulai Chondong	Zulkifli Mamat	BA (PAS)
N33	Banggol Judah	Zakaria Yaacob	BA (PAS)
N34	Kemuning	Hassan Muhamad	BA (PAS)
N35	Kemahang	Md. Anizam Ab. Rahman	BA (PAS)
N36	Air Lanas	Abdullah Ya'kub	BA (PAS)
N37	Pergau	Mamat Abdullah	BA (PAS)
N38	Guchil	Zulkafli Yacob	BA (PAS)
N39	Mengkebang	Ibrahim Mahmood	BA (PAS)
N40	Manek Urai	Ismail Yaacob	BA (PAS)
N41	Dabong	Abdul Ghafar Yusoff	BA (PAS)
N42	Paloh	Nozula Mat Diah	BN (UMNO)
N43	Galas	Mohamad Saufi Deraman	BN (UMNO)

== Terengganu ==
No.	State Constituency	Member	Party
PAS 28 | BN 4
N01	Kuala Besut	Nik Muhammad Zawawi Salleh	BA (PAS)
N02	Kampung Raja	Abd Rahman @ Abdul Aziz Abas	BA (PAS)
N03	Jertih	Salleh Abas (EXCO Member)	BA (PAS)
N04	Hulu Besut	Abdullah Mat Dan	BA (PAS)
N05	Jabi	Shaharizukirnain Abdul Kadir	BA (PAS)
N06	Permaisuri	Rozali Muhammad	BA (PAS)
N07	Langkap	Mohamad Hitam	BA (PAS)
N08	Batu Rakit	Abu Bakar Chik (EXCO Member)	BA (PAS)
N09	Tepuh	Abu Bakar Abdullah (EXCO Member)	BA (PAS)
N10	Teluk Pasu	Ismail Mamat	BA (PAS)
N11	Seberang Takir	Abdul Rashid Ngah	BN (UMNO)
N12	Bukit Tunggal	Alias Razak	BA (PAS)
N13	Wakaf Mempelam	Mohd Abdul Wahid Endut (EXCO Member)	BA (PAS)
N14	Bandar	Md Azmi Lop Yusof	BA (PAS)
N15	Ladang	Sulaiman Abdullah	BA (PAS)
N16	Batu Buruk	Wan Abd Muttalib @ Wan Musa Embong (EXCO Member)	BA (PAS)
N17	Alur Limbat	Yahaya Ali (EXCO Member)	BA (PAS)
N18	Bukit Payung	Hassan Mohd Salleh	BA (PAS)
N19	Ru Rendang	Abdul Hadi Awang (Menteri Besar)	BA (PAS)
N20	Pengkalan Berangan	Mustafa @ Hassan Ali (EXCO Member)	BA (PAS)
N21	Telemung	T Putera T Awang	BN (UMNO)
N22	Manir	Harun Taib (EXCO Member)	BA (PAS)
N23	Kuala Berang	Mamad Puteh	BA (PAS)
N24	Ajil	Rosol Wahid	BN (UMNO)
N25	Bukit Besi	Roslan Ismail	BA (PAS)
N26	Rantau Abang	Azman Shapawi Abdul Rani	BA (PAS)
N27	Sura	Wan Hassan Mohd Ramli (EXCO Member)	BA (PAS)
N28	Paka	Satiful Bahri Mamat	BA (PAS)
N29	Kemasik	Mohamad @ Abu Bakar Ali	BN (UMNO)
N30	Kijal	Mehamad Sulong	BA (PAS)
N31	Cukai	Awang Jusoh (EXCO Member)	BA (PAS)
N32	Air Putih	Ismail Harun	BA (PAS)

== Penang ==
No.	State Constituency	Member	Party
BN 30 | DAP 1 | KeADILan 1 | PAS 1
N01	Penaga	Azhar Ibrahim	BN (UMNO)
N02	Bertam	Hilmi Abdul Rashid	BN (UMNO)
N03	Pinang Tunggal	Yahaya Abdul Hamid	BN (UMNO)
N04	Permatang Berangan	Abd Ro'ni A. Hasan	BN (UMNO)
N05	Sungai Dua	Jasmin Mohamed	BN (UMNO)
N06	Telok Ayer Tawar	Jahara Hamid	BN (UMNO)
N07	Sungai Puyu	Loo Ah Dee @ Lee Ah Lee	BN (MCA)
N08	Bagan Jermal	Sak Cheng Lum	BN (MCA)
N09	Perai	Rajapathy Kuppusamy	BN (MIC)
N10	Seberang Jaya	Radin Muhamad Amin Radin Hadi Munir	BN (UMNO)
N11	Permatang Pasir	Mohd Hamdan Abdul Rahman	BA (PAS)
N12	Penanti	Abdul Rahman Abdul Kadir	BA (KeADILan)
N13	Berapit	Lau Chiek Tuan	BN (MCA)
N14	Machang Bubok	Toh Kin Woon	BN (Gerakan)
N15	Bukit Tengah	Ng Siew Lai	BN (Gerakan)
N16	Sungai Bakap	Lai Chew Hock	BN (Gerakan)
N17	Jawi	Tan Cheng Liang	BN (MCA)
N18	Sungai Acheh	Abd. Rashid Abdullah	BN (UMNO)
N19	Tanjong Bunga	Koh Tsu Koon	BN (Gerakan)
N20	Air Itam	Lye Siew Weng	BN (MCA)
N21	Kebun Bunga	Teng Hock Nan	BN (Gerakan)
N22	Padang Kota	Teng Chang Yeow	BN (Gerakan)
N23	Pengkalan Kota	Lee Hack Teik	BN (MCA)
N24	Kampong Kolam	Lim Gim Soon	BN (MCA)
N25	Datok Keramat	Lim Boo Chang	BN (Gerakan)
N25	Datok Keramat	Lim Boo Chang	BN (MCA)
N26	Sungai Pinang	Looi Swee Cheang	BN (Gerakan)
N27	Batu Lancang	Law Heng Kiang	BA (DAP)
N28	Bukit Gelugor	Koay Kar Huah	BN (MCA)
N29	Paya Terubong	Loh Hock Hun	BN (MCA)
N30	Batu Uban	Kee Phaik Cheen	BN (Gerakan)
N31	Bayan Lepas	Lim Chien Aun	BN (Gerakan)
N31	Bayan Lepas	Lim Chien Aun	BN (MCA)
N32	Telok Kumbar	Syed Amerruddin Syed Ahmad	BN (UMNO)
N33	Telok Bahang	Hilmi Yahaya	BN (UMNO)

== Perak ==
No.	State Constituency	Member	Party
BN 44 | DAP 4 | PAS 3 | KeADILan 1
N01	Pengkalan Hulu	Ibrahim Mohd Hanafiah	BN (UMNO)
N02	Temenggor	Mokhtarudin Mohamad Kaya	BN (UMNO)
N03	Kenering	Tajol Rosli Mohd Ghazali	BN (UMNO)
N04	Selama	Mohd Ali Mohd Isa	BN (UMNO)
N05	Batu Kurau	Mohd Jafri Mohd Yunus	BN (UMNO)
N06	Titi Serong	Ahmad Azhar Sharin	BA (PAS)
N07	Kuala Kurau	Ahmad Shariffudin A Aziz	BN (UMNO)
N08	Alor Pongsu	Qamaruz Zaman Ismail	BN (UMNO)
N09	Gunong Semanggol	Jaberal @ Sabran Hasmawi @ Asmawi	BA (PAS)
N10	Kuala Sapetang	Siew Kok Kan	BN (Gerakan)
N11	Changkat Jering	Mat Isa Ismail	BN (UMNO)
N12	Trong	Saharudin Abd Jabar	BN (UMNO)
N13	Kamunting	Abdul Malek Mohamed Hanafiah	BN (UMNO)
N14	Pokok Assam	Ho Cheng Wang	BN (MCA)
N15	Aulong	Yeong Sing Chee	BN (MCA)
N16	Lenggong	Saarani Mohamad	BN (UMNO)
N17	Lubok Merbau	Jamal Nasir Rasdi	BN (UMNO)
N18	Lintang	Mohamad Padil Harun	BN (UMNO)
N19	Jalong	Chang Ko Youn	BN (Gerakan)
N20	Manjoi	Nadzri Ismail	BN (UMNO)
N21	Hulu Kinta	Mazidah Zakaria	BN (UMNO)
N22	Taman Canning	Hiew Yew Can @ Khiew Yau Kan	BN (Gerakan)
N23	Tebing Tinggi	Chew Wai Khoon	BN (MCA)
N24	Pasir Pinji	Chan Kam	BN (MCA)
N25	Bercham	Tan Chin Meng	BN (MCA)
N26	Buntong	Yik Phooi Hong	BN (MCA)
N27	Menglembu	Keong Meng Sing	BA (DAP)
N28	Lahat	Lee Kon Yin	BN (MCA)
N29	Bukit Chandan	Ahmad Jaafar	BN (UMNO)
N30	Manong	Ramly Zahari	BN (UMNO)
N31	Pengkalan Baharu	Hamdi Abu Bakar	BN (UMNO)
N32	Pantai Remis	Nga Kor Ming	BA (DAP)
N33	Belanja	Faizol Fazli Mohamed	BA (PAS)
N34	Bota	Usaili Alias	BA (KeADILan)
N35	Rapat Setia	Chang Kon You	BN (MCA)
N36	Teja	Ho Wai Cheong	BN (MCA)
N37	Tualang Sekah	Mohd Radzi Manan	BN (UMNO)
N38	Kuala Dipang	Chong Fah	BN (MCA)
N39	Malim Nawar	Lee Chee Leong	BN (MCA)
N40	Chenderiang	Ong Ka Chuan	BN (MCA)
N41	Ayer Kuning	Azman Mahalan	BN (UMNO)
N42	Sungai Manik	Mohamed Pakri @ Mohamed Nazri A Rahim	BN (UMNO)
N43	Kampong Gajah	Ainon Khariyah Mohd Abas	BN (UMNO)
N44	Pangkor	Mohamad Wajdi Ishak	BN (UMNO)
N45	Pasir Panjang	Munisamy Kuppan	BN (MIC)
N46	Sitiawan	Hu Chan You	BA (DAP)
N47	Rungkup	Abdullah Ahmad	BN (UMNO)
N48	Hutan Melintang	Rajoo Govindasamy	BN (MIC)
N49	Pasir Bedamar	Seah Leong Peng	BA (DAP)
N50	Changkat Jong	Onn Hamzah	BN (UMNO)
N51	Sungkai	Ganesan Retanam	BN (MIC)
N52	Slim	Junus Wahid	BN (UMNO)

== Pahang ==
No.	State Constituency	Member	Party
BN 30 | PAS 6 | DAP 1 | KeADILan 1
N01	Cameron Highlands	Law Kee Long	BN (MCA)
N02	Jelai	Omar Othman	BN (UMNO)
N03	Padang Tengku	Abdul Halim Mansor	BN (UMNO)
N04	Ceka	Fong Koong Fuee	BN (MCA)
N05	Benta	Mohd. Soffi Abd. Razak	BN (UMNO)
N06	Batu Talam	Tengku Paris Tengku Razlan	BN (UMNO)
N07	Teras	Chan Choon Fah	BN (MCA)
N08	Dong	Shahiruddin Ab Moin	BN (UMNO)
N09	Tahan	Abd Malik Yusof	BA (PAS)
N10	Damak	Lau Lee	BN (MCA)
N11	Pulau Tawar	Ahmad Shukri Ismail	BN (UMNO)
N12	Beserah	Fauzi Abdul Rahman	BN (UMNO)
N13	Teruntum	Kan Tong Leong	BN (MCA)
N14	Indera Mahkota	Ti Lian Ker	BN (MCA)
N15	Sungai Lembing	Md Sohaimi Mohamed Shah	BN (UMNO)
N16	Lepar	Ahmad Tajuddin Sulaiman	BN (UMNO)
N17	Penur	Abdul Aziz Long	BA (PAS)
N18	Kuala Pahang	Mohd Iqmal Hamdi Mohd Rusdi	BA (PAS)
N19	Bebar	Ishak Muhamad	BN (UMNO)
N20	Cini	Mohd Jafri Ab Rashid	BA (KeADILan)
N21	Luit	Ahmad Munawar Abdul Jalil	BN (UMNO)
N22	Hulu Jempol	Rosni Zahari	BN (UMNO)
N23	Jengka	Tuan Ibrahim Tuan Man	BA (PAS)
N24	Cenur	Tan Mohd Aminuddin Ishak	BN (UMNO)
N25	Jenderak	Mohamed Jaafar	BN (UMNO)
N26	Sanggang	Redzwan Harun from 1 April 2000	BN (UMNO)
N26	Sanggang	Abdullah Kia until 26 February 2000	BN (UMNO)
N27	Lancang	Mohd Sharkar Shamsudin	BN (UMNO)
N28	Bilut	Hoh Khai Mun	BN (MCA)
N29	Ketari	Yum Ah Ha @ Yim Ah Ha from 31 March 2002	BN (Gerakan)
N29	Ketari	Loke Koon Kam until 3 February 2002	BN (Gerakan)
N30	Sabai	Davendran Murthy	BN (MIC)
N31	Pelangai	Adnan Yaakob	BN (UMNO)
N32	Semantan	Idris Omar	BA (PAS)
N33	Teriang	Leong Ngah Ngah	BA (DAP)
N34	Guai	Abdul Aziz Yaakob	BA (PAS)
N35	Bera	Mohd Hayani Abd Rahman	BN (UMNO)
N36	Bukit Ibam	Hasan Arifin	BN (UMNO)
N37	Muadzam Shah	Maznah Mazlan	BN (UMNO)
N38	Tioman	Mustafar Abu Bakar	BN (UMNO)

== Selangor ==
No.	State constituency	Member	Party
BN 42 | PAS 4 | DAP 1 | KeADILan 1
N01	Sungai Air Tawar	Mat Yasir Ikhsan	BN (UMNO)
N02	Sabak	Raja Ideris Raja Ahmad	BN (UMNO)
N03	Sungai Besar	Sallehen Mukhyi	BA (PAS)
N04	Sungai Panjang	Mohamed Khir Toyo	BN (UMNO)
N05	Sekinchan	Chia Kim Lem	BN (MCA)
N06	Sungai Burung	Hasan Mohamed Ali	BA (PAS)
N07	Hulu Bernam	Mohamed Idris Abu Bakar	BN (UMNO)
N08	Kuala Kubu Baharu	Ch'ng Toh Eng	BN (MCA)
N09	Batang Kali	Zainal Abidin Sakom	BN (UMNO)
N10	Permatang	Abu Hassan Omar	BN (UMNO)
N11	Ijok	Sivalingam Arumugam Karuppiah	BN (MIC)
N12	Jeram	Mesrah Selamat	BN (UMNO)
N13	Rawang	Tang See Hang	BN (MCA)
N14	Selayang Baharu	Ahmad Bhari Abd Rahman	BN (UMNO)
N15	Paya Jaras	Sulaiman Samat	BN (UMNO)
N16	Sungai Tua	Jagarasah Verasamy	BN (MIC)
N17	Gombak Setia	Ismail Kamus	BA (PAS)
N18	Hulu Kelang	Mohamed Azmin Ali	BA (KeADILan)
N19	Ampang	Mufti Suib	BN (UMNO)
N20	Pandan	Mad Aris Mad Yusof	BN (UMNO)
N21	Lembah Jaya	Ismail Kijo	BN (UMNO)
N22	Dusun Tua	Zainal Abidin Ahmad	BN (UMNO)
N23	Kajang	Shafie Abu Bakar	BA (PAS)
N24	Beranang	Ahmad Kuris Mohd Nor	BN (UMNO)
N25	Damansara Utama	Lim Choon Kin	BN (MCA)
N26	Kampung Tunku	Wong Sai Hou	BN (MCA)
N27	Bukit Gasing	Lim Thuang Seng	BN (Gerakan)
N28	Taman Medan	Norkhaila Jamaluddin	BN (UMNO)
N29	Pucung	Mohamad Satim Diman	BN (UMNO)
N30	Sri Kembangan	Liew Yuen Keong	BN (MCA)
N31	Balakong	Hoh Hee Lee	BN (MCA)
N32	Bukit Lanjan	Lum Weng Keong	BN (Gerakan)
N33	Kelana Jaya	Mohd Mokhtar Ahmad Dahalan	BN (UMNO)
N34	Subang Jaya	Lee Hwa Beng	BN (MCA)
N35	Batu Tiga	Salamon Selamat	BN (UMNO)
N36	Sungai Renggam	Ahmad Nawawi M. Zin	BN (UMNO)
N37	Kota Raja	Kamala Ganapathy	BN (MIC)
N38	Meru	Jaei Ismail	BN (UMNO)
N39	Sementa	Abd Rahman Palil	BN (UMNO)
N40	Selat Klang	Zakaria Deros	BN (UMNO)
N41	Bandar Klang	Teng Chang Khim	BA (DAP)
N42	Pelabuhan Klang	Tai Chang Eng @ Teh Chang Ying	BN (MCA)
N43	Sijangkang	Abdul Fatah Iskandar	BN (UMNO)
N44	Teluk Datuk	Ei Kim Hock	BN (MCA)
N45	Morib	Samat @ Abd Samad Maharudin	BN (UMNO)
N46	Batu Laut	Mohd Khailani Mangon	BN (UMNO)
N47	Dengkil	Mohd Sharif Jajang	BN (UMNO)
N48	Sungai Pelek	Liew Chee Khong @ Liew Chee Choong	BN (MCA)

== Negeri Sembilan ==
No.	State constituency	Member	Party
BN 32
N01	Chennah	Lim Yong @ Lim Chen	BN (MCA)
N02	Klawang	Shamsul Bahari @ Ramli Mat	BN (UMNO)
N03	Pertang	Razak Mansor	BN (UMNO)
N04	Sungai Lui	Anuar Rasidin @ Rashidin	BN (UMNO)
N05	Serting	Lilah Yasin	BN (UMNO)
N06	Bahau	See Ah Kow	BN (MCA)
N07	Jeram Padang	Rajagopalu Thamotharapillay	BN (MIC)
N08	Palong	Kamaruddin Mohd Din	BN (UMNO)
N09	Gemas	Mohd Yassin Bakar	BN (UMNO)
N10	Gemencheh	Waad Mansor	BN (UMNO)
N11	Repah	Gan Chin Yap	BN (MCA)
N12	Kota	Zaharudin Mohd Shariff	BN (UMNO)
N13	Juasseh	Hasan Malek	BN (UMNO)
N14	Senaling	Ismail Lasim	BN (UMNO)
N15	Johol	Darus Salim Bulin	BN (UMNO)
N16	Pilah	Norhayati Omar	BN (UMNO)
N17	Seri Menanti	Ibrahim Jahaya	BN (UMNO)
N18	Nilai	Peter Lai Yit Fee	BN (MCA)
N19	Lenggeng	Ishak Ismail	BN (UMNO)
N20	Senawang	Woo Ah Lek @ Woo Siak Chee	BN (Gerakan)
N21	Ampangan	Zakaria Nordin	BN (UMNO)
N22	Lobak	Khoo Seng Hock	BN (MCA)
N23	Labu	Muhamad Sahlan Shaid	BN (UMNO)
N24	Temiang	Lee Yuen Fong	BN (MCA)
N25	Rahang	Yip Chee Kiong	BN (MCA)
N26	Mambau	Yu Chok Tow	BN (MCA)
N27	Rantau	Ab. Ghani Hassan	BN (UMNO)
N28	Chembong	Firdaus Muhammad Rom Harun	BN (UMNO)
N29	Linggi	Mohd Isa Abdul Samad	BN (UMNO)
N30	Pasir Panjang	Sainy Edris	BN (UMNO)
N31	Si Rusa	Yohevel Esekimuthu	BN (MIC)
N32	Lukut	Yeow Chai Thiam	BN (MCA)

== Malacca ==
No.	State constituency	Member	Party
BN 21 | DAP 4
N01	Kuala Linggi	Ibrahim Durum	BN (UMNO)
N02	Ramuan China	Long @ Mohd Nor Said	BN (UMNO)
N03	Melekek	Nawi Ahmad	BN (UMNO)
N04	Masjid Tanah	Ramli Mohd Said	BN (UMNO)
N05	Sungai Udang	Ab Karim Sulaiman	BN (UMNO)
N06	Pulau Sebang	Ab. Aziz Isa	BN (UMNO)
N07	Bukit Sedanan	Poh Ah Tiam	BN (MCA)
N08	Bukit Asahan	Raghavan Raman	BN (MIC)
N09	Durian Tunggal	Abdul Karim Daud	BN (UMNO)
N10	Rembia	Hamdin Abdollah	BN (UMNO)
N11	Tangga Batu	Yaakub Md. Amin	BN (UMNO)
N12	Paya Rumput	Mohd Ali Rustam	BN (UMNO)
N13	Ayer Keroh	Seah Kwi Tong	BN (MCA)
N14	Bachang	Lim Jak Wong	BA (DAP)
N15	Ayer Molek	Momin Abdul Aziz	BN (UMNO)
N16	Tengkera	Goh Leong San	BA (DAP)
N17	Durian Daun	Betty Chew Gek Cheng	BA (DAP)
N18	Bandar Hilir	Sim Tong Him	BA (DAP)
N19	Duyong	Gan Boon Leong	BN (MCA)
N20	Alai	Amid Nordin	BN (UMNO)
N21	Ayer Panas	Chong Tam On	BN (MCA)
N22	Rim	Ramlah Abas	BN (UMNO)
N23	Merlimau	Nazari Adzim	BN (UMNO)
N24	Serkam	Ahmad Hamzah	BN (UMNO)
N25	Sungai Rambai	Abdul Azis Abdul Ghani	BN (UMNO)

== Johor ==
No.	State constituency	Member	Party
BN 40
N01	Sepinang	Othman Jais	BN (UMNO)
N02	Jementah	Gan Lian Keng @ Lee Ah Kau	BN (MCA)
N03	Tangkak	Yap Chik Dong	BN (MCA)
N04	Serom	Abdul Ghani Othman	BN (UMNO)
N05	Bukit Serampang	Tahir Mohd Taat	BN (UMNO)
N06	Jorak	Samat Aripin	BN (UMNO)
N07	Tenang	Ibrahim Daud	BN (UMNO)
N08	Bekok	Tan Kok Hong @ Tan Yi	BN (MCA)
N09	Endau	Zainal Abidin Osman	BN (UMNO)
N10	Tenggaroh	Krishnasamy Shiman	BN (MIC)
N11	Paloh	Choong Ah Onn @ Chong Ah Owon	BN (MCA)
N12	Mengkibol	Ng Kim Lai	BN (MCA)
N13	Sri Medan	Ahmad Zahri Jamil	BN (UMNO)
N14	Semerah	Tan Teck Poh @ Tan Ah Too	BN (MCA)
N15	Bukit Naning	Jamilah Othman	BN (UMNO)
N16	Maharani	Lau Yew Wee @ Low Yu Wee	BN (MCA)
N17	Parit Bakar	Mohd Ismail Mohd Shah	BN (UMNO)
N18	Sungai Balang	Md Salikon Sarpin	BN (UMNO)
N19	Parit Yaani	Hamzah Ramli	BN (UMNO)
N20	Parit Raja	Ali Shikh Ahmad	BN (UMNO)
N21	Penggaram	Chua Soi Lek	BN (MCA)
N22	Rengit	Zainal Abidin Mohamed Zin	BN (UMNO)
N23	Panti	Mohamad Ameran Sohiran	BN (UMNO)
N24	Gunung Lambak	Halimah Mohamed Sadique	BN (UMNO)
N25	Simpang Renggam	Law Boon King @ Low Boon Hong	BN (MCA)
N26	Benut	Saklon @ Salehon Sengot	BN (UMNO)
N27	Kulai	Khoo Che Wat	BN (Gerakan)
N28	Bukit Permai	Adam Abdul Hamid	BN (UMNO)
N29	Sedili	Asiah Md Ariff	BN (UMNO)
N30	Pengerang	Harun Abdullah	BN (UMNO)
N31	Tiram	Mohamad Dolmat	BN (UMNO)
N32	Pasir Gudang	Paliksina Sivalinggam	BN (MIC)
N33	Tanjong Puteri	Mohamad Kasbi	BN (UMNO)
N34	Stulang	Freddie Lonh Hoo Min @ Long Ah Mui	BN (MCA)
N35	Tambatan	Low Teh Hian	BN (MCA)
N36	Kempas	Osman Sapian	BN (UMNO)
N37	Tanjong Kupang	Baharom Ab Ghani	BN (UMNO)
N38	Skudai	Khoo Kong Ek	BN (Gerakan)
N39	Pulai Sebatang	Malik @ Abd Malik Ibrahim	BN (UMNO)
N40	Kukup	Jamaliah @ Jamilah Endan	BN (UMNO)

== Sabah ==
No.	State constituency	Member	Party
BN 31 | PBS 17
N01	Banggi	Amir Kahar Mustapha	BN (UMNO)
N02	Kudat	Chong Kah Kiat	BN (LDP)
N03	Bengkoka	Masrani Parman	BN (UMNO)
N04	Matunggong	Atong Mangabis	PBS
N05	Tandek	Maximus Ongkili	PBS
N06	Tempasuk	Musbah Jamli	BN (UMNO)
N07	Kadamaian	Timbon @ Herbert Lagadan	PBS
N08	Usukan	Salleh Said Keruak	BN (UMNO)
N09	Tamparuli	Edward Linggu Bukut	PBS
N10	Sulaman	Hajiji Noor	BN (UMNO)
N11	Kiulu	Lovis Rampas	PBS
N12	Inanam	Goh Chin Lok @ Johnny Goh	PBS
N13	Likas	Yong Teck Lee recontest, won on 21 July 2001	BN (SAPP)
N14	Api-Api	Yee Moh Chai	PBS
N15	Sembulan	Edward Yong Oui Fah	PBS
N16	Moyog	Clarenece Bongkos	PBS
N17	Petagas	Yahyah Hussin	BN (UMNO)
N18	Kawang	Osu Sukam	BN (UMNO)
N19	Pantai Manis	Abdul Rahim Ismail	BN (UMNO)
N20	Bongawan	Karim Bujang	BN (UMNO)
N21	Kuala Penyu	Wences Anggang	BN (UPKO)
N22	Klias	Lajim Ukin	BN (UMNO)
N23	Lumadan	Sarinum Sadikun	BN (UMNO)
N24	Sindumin	Sapawi Ahmad	BN (UMNO)
N25	Kundasang	Karim Adam	PBS
N26	Ranau	Siringan Gubat	BN (UPKO)
N27	Tambunan	Joseph Pairin Kitingan	PBS
N28	Bingkor	Jeffrey Kitingan	PBS
N29	Pensiangan	Ulin Pamiang	PBS
N30	Melalap	Radin Malleh	PBS
N31	Kemabong	Rubin Balang	BN (UMNO)
N32	Sugut	Surady Kayong	BN (UMNO)
N33	Labuk	Metah Asang	PBS
N34	Sungai Sibuga	Musa Aman	BN (UMNO)
N35	Sekong	Nahalan Damsal	BN (UMNO)
N36	Elopura	Tham Nyip Shen	BN (SAPP)
N37	Tanjong Papat	Raymond Tan Shu Kiah	BN (SAPP)
N38	Karamunting	Wong Lien Tat	BN (LDP)
N39	Sukau	Aklee Abass	BN (UMNO)
N40	Kuamut	Abd. Malek Chua	PBS
N41	Kunak	Jasa Rauddah	BN (UMNO)
N42	Lahad Datu	Samsu Baharum Abdul Rahman	BN (UMNO)
N43	Sulabayan	Mohd Lan Allani	BN (UMNO)
N44	Senallang	Nasir Sakaran	BN (UMNO)
N45	Balung	Abdul Manan Jakasa	BN (UMNO)
N46	Merotai	Patawari Patawe	BN (UMNO)
N47	Kalabakan	Abdul Ghapur Salleh	BN (UMNO)
N48	Sri Tanjong	Samson Chin Chee Tsu	PBS

== Sarawak ==
=== 2001–2006 ===
No.	State constituency	Member	Party
BN 60 | DAP 1 | IND 1
N01	Tanjong Datu	Ranum Mina	BN (SUPP)
N02	Tasik Biru	Peter Nansian Ngusie	BN (SNAP)
N03	Pantai Damai	Abdul Rahman Junaidi	BN (PBB)
N04	Demak Laut	Abang Draup Zamahari Abang Zen	BN (PBB)
N05	Tupong	Daud Abdul Rahman	BN (PBB)
N06	Satok	Abang Abdul Rahman Zohari Abang Openg	BN (PBB)
N07	Samariang	Sharifah Mordiah Tuanku Fauzi	BN (PBB)
N08	Padungan	Lily Yong Lee Lee	BN (SUPP)
N09	Pending	Sim Kheng Hui	BN (SUPP)
N10	Batu Lintang	Chan Seng Khai	BN (SUPP)
N11	Batu Kawah	Alfred Yap Chin Loi	BN (SUPP)
N12	Asajaya	Abdul Karim Rahman Hamzah	BN (PBB)
N13	Muara Tuang	Adenan Satem	BN (PBB)
N14	Bengoh	Jerip Susil	BN (SUPP)
N15	Tarat	Roland Sagah Wee Inn	BN (PBB)
N16	Tebedu	Michael Manyin Jawong	BN (PBB)
N17	Kedup	Frederick Bayoi Manggie	BN (PBB)
N18	Sadong Jaya	Wan Abdul Wahab Wan Sanusi	BN (PBB)
N19	Simunjan	Mohd. Naroden Majais	BN (PBB)
N20	Sebuyau	Julaihi Narawi	BN (PBB)
N21	Beting Maro	Bolhassan Di	BN (PBB)
N22	Bukit Begunan	Mong Dagang	BN (PBDS)
N23	Simanggang	Francis Harden Hollis	BN (SUPP)
N24	Engkilili	Toh Heng San	BN (SUPP)
N25	Batang Ai	Dublin Unting Ingkot	BN (PBDS)
N26	Saribas	Wahbi Junaidi	BN (PBB)
N27	Layar	Alfred Jabu Numpang	BN (PBB)
N28	Kalaka	Abdul Wahab Aziz	BN (PBB)
N29	Krian	Peter Nyarok Entrie	BN (SNAP)
N30	Belawai	Hamden Ahmad	BN (PBB)
N31	Serdeng	Mohamad Asfia Awang Nassar	BN (PBB)
N32	Matu-Daro	Abdul Wahab Dolah	BN (PBB)
N33	Meradong	Ting Check Sii	BN (SUPP)
N34	Repok	David Teng Lung Chi	BN (SUPP)
N35	Pakan	William Mawan Ikom	BN (SNAP)
N36	Meluan	Wong Judat	IND
N37	Ngemah	Gabriel Adit Demong	BN (PBDS)
N38	Machan	Gramong Juna	BN (PBB)
N39	Bukit Assek	Daniel Ngieng Kiong Ann	BN (SUPP)
N40	Dudong	Soon Choon Teck	BN (SUPP)
N41	Bawang Assan	Wong Soon Koh	BN (SUPP)
N42	Pelawan	Vincent Goh Chung Siong	BN (SUPP)
N43	Nangka	Awang Bemee Awang Ali Basah	BN (PBB)
N44	Dalat	Fatimah Abdullah	BN (PBB)
N45	Balingian	Abdul Taib Mahmud	BN (PBB)
N46	Tamin	Joseph Entulu Belaun	BN (PBDS)
N47	Kakus	John Sikie Tayai	BN (PBDS)
N48	Pelagus	Larry Sng Wei Shien	BN (PBDS)
N49	Katibas	Ambrose Blikau Enturan	BN (PBB)
N50	Baleh	James Jemut Masing	BN (PBDS)
N51	Belaga	Stanley Ajang Batok	BN (PBDS)
N52	Kemena	Stephen Rundi Utom	BN (PBB)
N53	Kidurong	Chiew Chiu Sing	DAP
N54	Jepak	Talib Zulpilip	BN (PBB)
N55	Lambir	Swin Jemaah @ Aidan Wing	BN (PBB)
N56	Piasau	George Chan Hong Nam	BN (SUPP)
N57	Senadin	Lee Kim Sin	BN (SUPP)
N58	Marudi	Sylvester Entrie Muran	BN (SNAP)
N59	Telang Usan	Lihan Jok	BN (PBB)
N60	Limbang	Richard Wong Shoan Fook	BN (SNAP)
N61	Lawas	Awang Tengah Ali Hasan	BN (PBB)
N62	Ba'kelalan	Nelson Balang Rining from 18 September 2004	BN (SPDP)
N62	Ba'kelalan	Judson Sakai Tagal until 12 July 2004	BN (SNAP)
