= List of Malaysian State Assembly Representatives (1995–1999) =

Subnational legislature representatives

List of Malaysian State Assembly Representatives (1990–1995)
List of Malaysian State Assembly Representatives (1995–1999)
List of Malaysian State Assembly Representatives (1999–2004)

The following are the members of the Dewan Undangan Negeri or state assemblies, elected in the 1995 state election and by-elections. Also included is the list of the Sabah and Sarawak state assembly members who were elected in 1994 and 1996 respectively.

== Perlis ==
No.	State Constituency	Member	Party
BN 15
N01	Titi Tinggi	Loh Yoon Foo	BN (MCA)
N02	Beseri	Nordin Abdullah	BN (UMNO)
N03	Chuping	Yazid Mat	BN (UMNO)
N04	Mata Ayer	Ishak Arshad	BN (UMNO)
N05	Santan	Bahari Taib	BN (UMNO)
N06	Bintong	Sopiah Ahmad	BN (UMNO)
N07	Sena	Selamat Saad	BN (UMNO)
N08	Indera Kayangan	Khor Lian Tee	BN (MCA)
N09	Kuala Perlis	Abd Karim @ Ibrahim Mat Salleh	BN (UMNO)
N10	Kayang	Mohamad Hadzi Nordin	BN (UMNO)
N11	Pauh	Abdul Aziz Saad	BN (UMNO)
N12	Tambun Tulang	Shahidan Kassim	BN (UMNO)
N13	Guar Sanji	Arof Saad	BN (UMNO)
N14	Simpang Empat	Ramlah @ Che Ah Long	BN (UMNO)
N15	Sanglang	Karim Salleh	BN (UMNO)

== Kedah ==
9th Kedah State Legislative Assembly
←	8th Assembly	10th Assembly	→

Overview
- Legislative body: Kedah State Legislative Assembly
- Jurisdiction: Kedah
- Meeting place: Wisma Darul Aman, Alor Setar
- Term: 5 June 1995 – October 1999
- Election: 1995 state election
- Government: Kedah State Executive Council
- Website: mmk.kedah.gov.my
- Members: 36
- Speaker: Zainol Md Isa (until 31 July 1998); Abdul Razak Hashim
- Deputy Speaker: Syeikh Alias Mustafa
- Menteri Besar: Osman @ Mohd Daud Aroff (until 16 June 1996); Sanusi Junid
- Opposition Leader: Fadzil Noor
- Party control: Barisan Nasional

Sovereign
- Sultan: Sultan Abdul Halim Mu’adzam Shah

=== Elected members ===
No.	State Constituency	Member	Party
BN 34 | PAS 2
N01	Padang Matsirat	Md Hasan Bulat (EXCO Member)	BN (UMNO)
N02	Kuah	Sanusi Junid (Menteri Besar)	BN (UMNO)
N03	Ayer Hitam	Abdul Rahman Ariffin (EXCO Member)	BN (UMNO)
N04	Kota Siputeh	Abu Hasan Sarif	BN (UMNO)
N05	Tunjang	Barishah @ Habshah Saad	BN (UMNO)
N06	Jitra	Osman @ Mohd Daud Aroff	BN (UMNO)
N07	Kuala Nerang	Abd. Lateh Mohd Saman	BN (UMNO)
N08	Pedu	Ghazali Ibrahim (EXCO Member)	BN (UMNO)
N09	Bukit Lada	Ahmad Lebai Sudin (EXCO Member)	BN (UMNO)
N10	Langgar	Alias Lebai Mustafa @ Syeikh Alias Mustafa	BN (UMNO)
N11	Tanjong Seri	Abdul Rahman Ibrahim	BN (UMNO)
N12	Derga	Cheung Khai Yan	BN (Gerakan)
N13	Kota Darul Aman	Chong Kau Chai @ Chong Itt Chew	BN (MCA)
N14	Alor Merah	Ahmad Bashah Md Hanipah	BN (UMNO)
N15	Anak Bukit	Abdullah Hasnan Kamaruddin (EXCO Member)	BN (UMNO)
N16	Kubang Rotan	Syed Razak Syed Zain Barakbah (EXCO Member)	BN (UMNO)
N17	Pengkalan Kundor	Mohd Jamil Md Idross	BN (UMNO)
N18	Bukit Raya	Fadzil Noor (Opposition Leader)	APU (PAS)
N19	Sungai Tiang	Fatimah Ismail	BN (UMNO)
N20	Sala	Azizan Abdul Razak	APU (PAS)
N21	Guar Chempedak	Abdul Razak Hashim (Speaker)	BN (UMNO)
N22	Belantek	Hamlan Din	BN (UMNO)
N23	Jeneri	Mohd. Hadzir Jaafar	BN (UMNO)
N24	Bukit Selambau	Saravanan Velia Udayar (EXCO Member)	BN (MIC)
N25	Gurun	Beh Heng Seong (EXCO Member)	BN (MCA)
N26	Tanjong Dawai	Badri Yunus	BN (UMNO)
N27	Pantai Merdeka	Jamaludin Yusof	BN (UMNO)
N28	Bakar Arang	Tan Hong Eng	BN (MCA)
N29	Sidam	Fong Chok Gin (EXCO Member)	BN (Gerakan)
N30	Bayu	Mohd Sibi Ahmad	BN (UMNO)
N31	Kupang	Zainol Md Isa (EXCO Member)	BN (UMNO)
N32	Kuala Ketil	Mohd Hadzir Ismail	BN (UMNO)
N33	Merbau Pulas	Che Pora Omar	BN (UMNO)
N34	Lunas	M Joseph Philomin Joseph Fernandez	BN (MIC)
N35	Kulim	Yong Pau Chak	BN (MCA)
N36	Bandar Baharu	Muhamad Fishol Said	BN (UMNO)

=== Seating arrangement ===
Vacant	Vacant	Vacant	Vacant		Vacant	Vacant	Vacant	Vacant
Vacant	N32 Kuala Ketil	N33 Merbau Pulas	N34 Lunas		N12 Derga	N11 Tanjong Seri	N35 Kulim	Vacant
	N28 Bakar Arang	N03 Kota Siputeh	N05 Tunjang		N31 Kupang (EXCO Member)	N09 Bukit Lada (EXCO Member)	N06 Jitra
Vacant		N30 Bayu	C		B	N08 Pedu (EXCO Member)
Vacant	N24 Jeneri	N27 Pantai Merdeka	D	Sergeant-at-Arm	A	N22 Gurun (EXCO Member)	N21 Guar Chempedak (Speaker)
Vacant	N23 Belantek	N10 Langgar	D		A	N04 Ayer Hitam (EXCO Member)	N24 Sidam (EXCO Member)
Vacant	N17 Pengkalan Kundor	N19 Sungai Tiang	D	the Mace	A	N25 Bukit Selambau (EXCO Member)	N01 Padang Matsirat (EXCO Member)
Vacant	N14 Alor Merah	N26 Tanjong Dawai	D	the Mace	A	N15 Anak Bukit (EXCO Member)	State Financial Officer
Vacant	N13 Kota Darul Aman	N20 Sala	D		A	N16 Kubang Rotan (EXCO Member)	State Legal Advisor
N36 Bandar Baharu	N07 Kuala Nerang	N18 Bukit Raya (Opposition Leader)	D	Secretary	A	N02 Kuah (Menteri Besar)	State Secretary
				Speaker
				Sultan

== Kelantan ==
No.	State Constituency	Member	Party
PAS 23 | S46 10 | BN 8 | VAC 2
N01	Pengkalan Kubor	Mat Nawi Mat Jusoh	BN (UMNO)
N02	Kelaboran	Noordin Yaakub	APU (S46)
N03	Pasir Pekan	Ahmad Yaakob	APU (PAS)
N04	Kijang	Abdul Halim Abdul Rahman	APU (PAS)
N05	Chempaka	Nik Abdul Aziz Nik Mat	APU (PAS)
N06	Panchor	Mohd Yusoff Ludin	APU (PAS)
N07	Tanjong Mas	Wan Abdul Rahim Wan Abdullah	APU (PAS)
N08	Kota Lama	Leong Su Siang	BN (MCA)
N09	Bunut Payong	Halim Mohamad	APU (PAS)
N10	Wakaf Bharu	Ramli Abu Bakar	APU (PAS)
N11	Tendong	Hussin Ahmad	APU (S46)
N12	Pengkalan Pasir	Hassan Abdullah	APU (PAS)
N13	Meranti	Mohd. Nassuruddin Daud	APU (PAS)
N14	Gual Periok	Nik Mustapha Nik Loding	APU (S46)
N15	Bukit Tuku	Mohd Yusof Abdullah	APU (PAS)
N16	Salor	Ahmad Rusli Iberahim	APU (S46)
N17	Pasir Tumboh	Vacant from 3 September 1999	VAC
N17	Pasir Tumboh	Daud Yusuf until 3 September 1999	APU (PAS)
N18	Kenali	Mohamed Daud	APU (PAS)
N19	Tawang	Hassan Mohamood	APU (PAS)
N20	Perupok	Omar Mohammed	APU (PAS)
N21	Jelawat	Vacant from 26 February 1999	VAC
N21	Jelawat	Mohd Daud Ja'afar until 26 February 1999	APU (S46)
N22	Melor	Zainal Abidin Ab. Kadir	BN (UMNO)
N23	Kadok	Shamsudin @ Mohamed Shukri Ab. Rahman	APU (PAS)
N24	Ketereh	Ariffin Mahmud	BN (UMNO)
N25	Chetok	Hanafi Daud	APU (PAS)
N26	Bukit Panau	Mat Yusoff Mat Sah	APU (PAS)
N27	Gual Ipoh	Tengku Alang Tengku Sulong	APU (S46)
N28	Selising	Che Bisi Hassan	APU (PAS)
N29	Limbongan	Samat Mamat	APU (S46)
N30	Semerak	Kamaruddin Mohd Nor from 11 August 1997	BN (UMNO)
N30	Semerak	Sulaiman Ahmad until 6 July 1997	APU (PAS)
N31	Gaal	Alwi Jusoh	APU (PAS)
N32	Pulai Chondong	Zulkifli Mamat from 6 January 1997	APU (PAS)
N32	Pulai Chondong	Mohamad Noor Ahmad until 2 December 1996	APU (S46)
N33	Banggol Judah	Yahya Othman	APU (PAS)
N34	Kemuning	Hassan Muhamad	APU (PAS)
N35	Kemahang	Mohd Adhan Kechik	BN (UMNO)
N36	Air Lanas	Abdullah Ya'kub	APU (PAS)
N37	Pergau	Abdul Aziz Derashid	BN (UMNO)
N38	Guchil	Mohd Razali Che Mat	BN (UMNO)
N39	Mengkebang	Mek Som Mohamed	APU (S46)
N40	Manek Urai	Ismail Yaacob	APU (PAS)
N41	Dabong	Mohd Rozali Isohak	APU (S46)
N42	Paloh	Nozula Mat Diah	APU (S46)
N43	Galas	Omar Mohamed	APU (S46)

== Terengganu ==
No.	State Constituency	Member	Party
BN 25 | PAS 7
N01	Kuala Besut	Wan Zakaria Wan Abd. Rahman	BN (UMNO)
N02	Kampung Raja	Yusoff Md. Nor	BN (UMNO)
N03	Jertih	Idris Mamat	BN (UMNO)
N04	Hulu Besut	Yaakub Abd. Kadir	BN (UMNO)
N05	Jabi	Mohd Lukman Muda	BN (UMNO)
N06	Permaisuri	Mohd Jidin Shafee	BN (UMNO)
N07	Langkap	Mamat Ghazalee Abd Rahman	BN (UMNO)
N08	Batu Rakit	Abdul Wahab Ngah	BN (UMNO)
N09	Tepuh	Abu Bakar Abdullah	APU (PAS)
N10	Teluk Pasu	Ismail Mamat	APU (PAS)
N11	Seberang Takir	Abdul Rashid Ngah	BN (UMNO)
N12	Bukit Tunggal	Mohamad Abu Bakar	BN (UMNO)
N13	Wakaf Mempelam	Mohd Abdul Wahid Endut	APU (PAS)
N14	Bandar	Wong Foon Meng	BN (MCA)
N15	Ladang	Roslan Awang Chik	BN (UMNO)
N16	Batu Buruk	Wan Abd Muttalib @ Wan Musa Embong	APU (PAS)
N17	Alur Limbat	Yahaya Ali	APU (PAS)
N18	Bukit Payung	Abdul Latiff Awang	BN (UMNO)
N19	Ru Rendang	Abdul Hadi Awang	APU (PAS)
N20	Pengkalan Berangan	Muda Mamat	BN (UMNO)
N21	Telemung	T Putera T Awang	BN (UMNO)
N22	Manir	Harun Taib	APU (PAS)
N23	Kuala Berang	Ibrahim Yusof	BN (UMNO)
N24	Ajil	Othman Daud	BN (UMNO)
N25	Bukit Besi	Awang Jabar	BN (UMNO)
N26	Rantau Abang	Shafiee Daud	BN (UMNO)
N27	Sura	Ibrahim Awang	BN (UMNO)
N28	Paka	Engku Bijaya Sura Syed Omar	BN (UMNO)
N29	Kemasik	Mohamad @ Abu Bakar Ali	BN (UMNO)
N30	Kijal	Ahmad Said	BN (UMNO)
N31	Cukai	Wan Mokhtar Ahmad	BN (UMNO)
N32	Air Putih	Harun Hasan	BN (UMNO)

== Penang ==
No.	State Constituency	Member	Party
BN 32 | DAP 1
N01	Penaga	Azhar Ibrahim	BN (UMNO)
N02	Bertam	Hilmi Abdul Rashid	BN (UMNO)
N03	Pinang Tunggal	Yahaya Abdul Hamid	BN (UMNO)
N04	Permatang Berangan	Mohd Shariff Omar	BN (UMNO)
N05	Sungai Dua	Jasmin Mohamed	BN (UMNO)
N06	Telok Ayer Tawar	Jahara Hamid	BN (UMNO)
N07	Sungai Puyu	Loo Ah Dee @ Lee Ah Lee	BN (MCA)
N08	Bagan Jermal	Sak Cheng Lum	BN (MCA)
N09	Perai	Rajapathy Kuppusamy	BN (MIC)
N10	Seberang Jaya	Abdul Latiff S. Mirasa	BN (UMNO)
N11	Permatang Pasir	Ahmad Saad	BN (UMNO)
N12	Penanti	Daud Taha	BN (UMNO)
N13	Berapit	Lau Chiek Tuan	BN (MCA)
N14	Machang Bubok	Toh Kin Woon	BN (Gerakan)
N15	Bukit Tengah	Liang Thau Sang	BN (Gerakan)
N16	Sungai Bakap	Lai Chew Hock from 8 November 1997	BN (Gerakan)
N16	Sungai Bakap	Ooi Theng Bok until 23 September 1997	BN (Gerakan)
N17	Jawi	Tan Cheng Liang	BN (MCA)
N18	Sungai Acheh	Abd. Rashid Abdullah	BN (UMNO)
N19	Tanjong Bunga	Koh Tsu Koon	BN (Gerakan)
N20	Air Itam	Lye Siew Weng	BN (MCA)
N21	Kebun Bunga	Teng Hock Nan	BN (Gerakan)
N22	Padang Kota	Teng Chang Yeow	BN (Gerakan)
N23	Pengkalan Kota	Lee Hack Teik	BN (MCA)
N24	Kampong Kolam	Lim Gim Soon	BN (MCA)
N25	Datok Keramat	Lim Boo Chang	BN (Gerakan)
N26	Sungai Pinang	Kang Chin Seng	BN (Gerakan)
N27	Batu Lancang	Chong Eng	GR (DAP)
N28	Bukit Gelugor	Koay Kar Huah	BN (MCA)
N29	Paya Terubong	Loh Hock Hun	BN (MCA)
N30	Batu Uban	Kee Phaik Cheen	BN (Gerakan)
N31	Bayan Lepas	Lim Chien Aun	BN (Gerakan)
N32	Telok Kumbar	Syed Amerruddin Syed Ahmad	BN (UMNO)
N33	Telok Bahang	Hilmi Yahaya	BN (UMNO)

== Perak ==
No.	State Constituency	Member	Party
BN 51 | DAP 1
N01	Pengkalan Hulu	Ibrahim Mohd Hanafiah	BN (UMNO)
N02	Temengor	Mokhtarudin Mohamad Kaya	BN (UMNO)
N03	Kenering	Khamsiyah Yeop	BN (UMNO)
N04	Selama	Mohd Ali Mohd Isa	BN (UMNO)
N05	Batu Kurau	Raja Ahmad Zainuddin Raja Omar	BN (UMNO)
N06	Titi Serong	Abdul Latif Mat Ali	BN (UMNO)
N07	Kuala Kurau	Ahmad Shariffudin A Aziz	BN (UMNO)
N08	Alor Pongsu	Baharudin Mat Nor	BN (UMNO)
N09	Gunong Semanggol	Saikidol Mohamad Noor	BN (UMNO)
N10	Kuala Sapetang	Siew Kok Kan	BN (Gerakan)
N11	Changkat Jering	Mat Isa Ismail from 8 November 1997	BN (UMNO)
N11	Changkat Jering	Mohamad Razlan Abdul Hamid until 26 September 1997	BN (UMNO)
N12	Trong	Saharudin Abd Jabar	BN (UMNO)
N13	Kamunting	Abdul Malek Mohamed Hanafiah	BN (UMNO)
N14	Pokok Assam	Ho Cheng Wang	BN (MCA)
N15	Aulong	Yap Peng Lan	BN (MCA)
N16	Lenggong	Talha Ismail	BN (UMNO)
N17	Lubok Merbau	Jamal Nasir Rasdi	BN (UMNO)
N18	Lintang	Mohamad Padil Harun	BN (UMNO)
N19	Jalong	Chang Ko Youn	BN (Gerakan)
N20	Manjoi	Nadzri Ismail	BN (UMNO)
N21	Hulu Kinta	Mazidah Zakaria	BN (UMNO)
N22	Taman Canning	Hiew Yew Can @ Khiew Yau Kan	BN (Gerakan)
N23	Tebing Tinggi	Chew Wai Khoon	BN (MCA)
N24	Pasir Pinji	Chan Kam	BN (MCA)
N25	Bercham	Tan Chin Meng	BN (MCA)
N26	Buntong	Yik Phooi Hong	BN (MCA)
N27	Menglembu	Liew Kai Chay @ Liew Choong Sang	BN (MCA)
N28	Lahat	Lee Kon Yin	BN (MCA)
N29	Bukit Chandan	Ahmad Jaafar	BN (UMNO)
N30	Manong	Ramly Zahari	BN (UMNO)
N31	Pengkalan Baharu	Hamdi Abu Bakar	BN (UMNO)
N32	Pantai Remis	Wong Chong Sang	BN (MCA)
N33	Belanja	Mohd Zaim Abu Hassan	BN (UMNO)
N34	Bota	Ismail Hasbolah	BN (UMNO)
N35	Rapat Setia	Song Yong Pheow	BN (MCA)
N36	Teja	Ho Wai Cheong	BN (MCA)
N37	Tualang Sekah	Mohd Radzi Manan	BN (UMNO)
N38	Kuala Dipang	Chong Fah	BN (MCA)
N39	Malim Nawar	Lee Chee Leong	BN (MCA)
N40	Chenderiang	Ong Ka Chuan	BN (MCA)
N41	Ayer Kuning	Azman Mahalan	BN (UMNO)
N42	Sungai Manik	Mohamed Pakri @ Mohamed Nazri A Rahim	BN (UMNO)
N43	Kampong Gajah	Ramli Ngah Talib	BN (UMNO)
N44	Pangkor	Mohamad Wajdi Ishak	BN (UMNO)
N45	Pasir Panjang	M. Muthiah	BN (MIC)
N46	Sitiawan	Hu Chan You	GR (DAP)
N47	Rungkup	Abdullah Ahmad	BN (UMNO)
N48	Hutan Melintang	Rajoo Govindasamy	BN (MIC)
N49	Pasir Bedamar	Mah Siew Keong	BN (Gerakan)
N50	Changkat Jong	Mohd Arshad Abdullah	BN (UMNO)
N51	Sungkai	Veerasingam Suppiah	BN (MIC)
N52	Slim	Junus Wahid	BN (UMNO)

== Pahang ==
No.	State Constituency	Member	Party
BN 37 | DAP 1
N01	Cameron Highlands	Law Kee Long	BN (MCA)
N02	Jelai	Omar Othman	BN (UMNO)
N03	Padang Tengku	Abdul Fattah Abdullah	BN (UMNO)
N04	Ceka	Fong Koong Fuee	BN (MCA)
N05	Benta	Suhaimi Ibrahim	BN (UMNO)
N06	Batu Talam	Syed Ali Syed Mohammad	BN (UMNO)
N07	Teras	Biaw Nga @ Liaw Per Lou	BN (MCA)
N08	Dong	Shahiruddin Ab Moin	BN (UMNO)
N09	Tahan	Rahimah Mohammad Kawi	BN (UMNO)
N10	Damak	Lau Lee	BN (MCA)
N11	Pulau Tawar	Azizan Yaakob	BN (UMNO)
N12	Beserah	Jamal Ab Nasir Ismail	BN (UMNO)
N13	Teruntum	Kan Tong Leong	BN (MCA)
N14	Indera Mahkota	Ti Lian Ker	BN (MCA)
N15	Sungai Lembing	Ibrahim Mohd Taib	BN (UMNO)
N16	Lepar	Mohd Khalil Yaakob	BN (UMNO)
N17	Penur	Zainuddin Juma'at	BN (UMNO)
N18	Kuala Pahang	Abdullah Md Derus	BN (UMNO)
N19	Bebar	Ishak Muhamad	BN (UMNO)
N20	Cini	Wan Mohamad Razali Wan Mahussin	BN (UMNO)
N21	Luit	Ayub Teh	BN (UMNO)
N22	Hulu Jempol	Nazri Othman	BN (UMNO)
N23	Jengka	Zainal Hassan	BN (UMNO)
N24	Cenur	Tan Mohd Aminuddin Ishak	BN (UMNO)
N25	Jenderak	Mohamed Jaafar	BN (UMNO)
N26	Sanggang	Abdullah Kia	BN (UMNO)
N27	Lancang	Bahari Yahaya	BN (UMNO)
N28	Bilut	Hoh Khai Mun	BN (MCA)
N29	Ketari	Loke Koon Kam	BN (Gerakan)
N30	Sabai	R. Sinnathamby	BN (MIC)
N31	Pelangai	Adnan Yaakob	BN (UMNO)
N32	Semantan	Mohd Sarit Yusoh	BN (UMNO)
N33	Teriang	Leong Ngah Ngah	GR (DAP)
N34	Guai	Mohd Hayani Abd Rahman	BN (UMNO)
N35	Bera	Abdul Malik Ismail	BN (UMNO)
N36	Bukit Ibam	Hasan Arifin	BN (UMNO)
N37	Muadzam Shah	Maznah Mazlan	BN (UMNO)
N38	Tioman	Mustafar Abu Bakar	BN (UMNO)

== Selangor ==
No.	State constituency	Member	Party
BN 45 | DAP 3
N01	Sungai Air Tawar	Zainal Dahlan	BN (UMNO)
N02	Sabak	Raja Ideris Raja Ahmad	BN (UMNO)
N03	Sungai Besar	Ramli Norani	BN (UMNO)
N04	Sungai Panjang	Mohd Pauzi Abdul Murad	BN (UMNO)
N05	Sekinchan	Chia Kim Lem	BN (MCA)
N06	Sungai Burung	Mohd Aini Taib	BN (UMNO)
N07	Hulu Bernam	Zainal Abidin Sakom	BN (UMNO)
N08	Kuala Kubu Baharu	Ch'ng Toh Eng	BN (MCA)
N09	Batang Kali	Muhammad Muhammad Taib	BN (UMNO)
N10	Permatang	Abu Hassan Omar from 29 May 1997	BN (UMNO)
N10	Permatang	Jamaluddin Adnan until 30 April 1997	BN (UMNO)
N11	Ijok	Sivalingam Arumugam Karuppiah	BN (MIC)
N12	Jeram	Mesrah Selamat	BN (UMNO)
N13	Rawang	Tang See Hang	BN (MCA)
N14	Selayang Baharu	Ahmad Bhari Abd Rahman	BN (UMNO)
N15	Paya Jaras	Saidin Tamby	BN (UMNO)
N16	Sungai Tua	S. Gopala Krishnan	BN (MIC)
N17	Gombak Setia	Rakibah Abdul Manap	BN (UMNO)
N18	Hulu Kelang	Fuad Hassan	BN (UMNO)
N19	Ampang	Mufti Suib	BN (UMNO)
N20	Pandan	Mad Aris Mad Yusof	BN (UMNO)
N21	Lembah Jaya	Ismail Kijo	BN (UMNO)
N22	Dusun Tua	Zainal Abidin Ahmad	BN (UMNO)
N23	Kajang	Choong Tow Chong	BN (MCA)
N24	Beranang	Shoib Md. Silin	BN (UMNO)
N25	Damansara Utama	Oon Hong Geok	GR (DAP)
N26	Kampung Tunku	Khoo Ooi Seng	BN (MCA)
N27	Bukit Gasing	Teng Chang Khim	GR (DAP)
N28	Taman Medan	Zahar Hashim	BN (UMNO)
N29	Puchong	Mohamad Satim Diman	BN (UMNO)
N30	Sri Kembangan	Liew Yuen Keong	BN (MCA)
N31	Balakong	Hoh Hee Lee	BN (MCA)
N32	Bukit Lanjan	Pius Martin	BN (Gerakan)
N33	Kelana Jaya	Mohd Mokhtar Ahmad Dahalan	BN (UMNO)
N34	Subang Jaya	Lee Hwa Beng	BN (MCA)
N35	Batu Tiga	Abu Sujak Mahmud	BN (UMNO)
N36	Sungai Renggam	Mohd Zin Mohamed	BN (UMNO)
N37	Kota Raja	Rajakupal Sinathamby	BN (MIC)
N38	Meru	Jaei Ismail	BN (UMNO)
N39	Sementa	Abd Rahman Palil	BN (UMNO)
N40	Selat Klang	Onn Ismail	BN (UMNO)
N41	Bandar Klang	Chua Kow Eng	GR (DAP)
N42	Pelabuhan Klang	Tai Chang Eng @ Teh Chang Ying	BN (MCA)
N43	Sijangkang	Abdul Fatah Iskandar	BN (UMNO)
N44	Teluk Datuk	Ei Kim Hock	BN (MCA)
N45	Morib	Samat @ Abd Samad Maharudin	BN (UMNO)
N46	Batu Laut	Mohd Khailani Mangon	BN (UMNO)
N47	Dengkil	Mohd Sharif Jajang	BN (UMNO)
N48	Sungai Pelek	Liew Chee Khong @ Liew Chee Choong	BN (MCA)

== Negeri Sembilan ==
No.	State constituency	Member	Party
BN 30 | DAP 2
N01	Chennah	Lim Yong @ Lim Chen	BN (MCA)
N02	Klawang	Shamsul Bahari @ Ramli Mat	BN (UMNO)
N03	Pertang	Razak Mansor	BN (UMNO)
N04	Sungai Lui	Anuar Rasidin @ Rashidin	BN (UMNO)
N05	Serting	Lilah Yasin	BN (UMNO)
N06	Bahau	See Ah Kow	BN (MCA)
N07	Jeram Padang	Sundram Muthaya	BN (MIC)
N08	Palong	Kamaruddin Mohd Din	BN (UMNO)
N09	Gemas	Mohd Yassin Bakar	BN (UMNO)
N10	Gemencheh	Waad Mansor	BN (UMNO)
N11	Repah	Gan Chin Yap from 29 May 1997	BN (MCA)
N11	Repah	Lay Chun Tai @ Loy Chee Tai until 1997	BN (MCA)
N12	Kota	Ahmad Apandi Johan	BN (UMNO)
N13	Juasseh	Hasan Malek	BN (UMNO)
N14	Senaling	Zainal Mokhtar Mohd Yunus	BN (UMNO)
N15	Johol	Darus Salim Bulin	BN (UMNO)
N16	Pilah	Napsiah Omar	BN (UMNO)
N17	Seri Menanti	Hashimuddin Abdul Kadir	BN (UMNO)
N18	Nilai	Peter Lai Yit Fee	BN (MCA)
N19	Lenggeng	Ishak Ismail	BN (UMNO)
N20	Senawang	Woo Ah Lek @ Woo Siak Chee	BN (Gerakan)
N21	Ampangan	Dermataksiah Abdul Jalil	BN (UMNO)
N22	Lobak	Khoo Seng Hock	GR (DAP)
N23	Labu	Muhamad Sahlan Shaid	BN (UMNO)
N24	Temiang	Lee Yuen Fong	GR (DAP)
N25	Rahang	Goh Siow Huat	BN (MCA)
N26	Mambau	Lee Chee Keong	BN (MCA)
N27	Rantau	Hamdan Mohamad	BN (UMNO)
N28	Chembong	Firdaus Muhammad Rom Harun	BN (UMNO)
N29	Linggi	Mohd Isa Abdul Samad	BN (UMNO)
N30	Pasir Panjang	Sainy Edris	BN (UMNO)
N31	Si Rusa	Krishnan Sellapan	BN (MIC)
N32	Lukut	Yeow Chai Thiam	BN (MCA)

== Malacca ==
No.	State constituency	Member	Party
BN 22 | DAP 3
N01	Kuala Linggi	Ibrahim Durum	BN (UMNO)
N02	Ramuan China	Long @ Mohd Nor Said	BN (UMNO)
N03	Melekek	Nawi Ahmad from 14 June 1997	BN (UMNO)
N03	Melekek	Mohd Zin Abdul Ghani until 14 May 1997	BN (UMNO)
N04	Masjid Tanah	Ramli Mohd Said	BN (UMNO)
N05	Sungai Udang	Noordin Yaani	BN (UMNO)
N06	Pulau Sebang	Mohd Shariff Mohd Drus	BN (UMNO)
N07	Bukit Sedanan	Poh Ah Tiam	BN (MCA)
N08	Bukit Asahan	R. Raghavan from 22 June 1996	BN (MIC)
N08	Bukit Asahan	Arunasalam Narayanan until 28 April 1996	BN (MIC)
N09	Durian Tunggal	Sahar Arpan	BN (UMNO)
N10	Rembia	Hamdin Abdollah	BN (UMNO)
N11	Tangga Batu	Hazizah Mohd Sultan	BN (UMNO)
N12	Paya Rumput	Yasin Mohd Sarif	BN (UMNO)
N13	Ayer Keroh	Seah Kwi Tong	BN (MCA)
N14	Bachang	Chua Peng Song	BN (MCA)
N15	Ayer Molek	Momin Abdul Aziz	BN (UMNO)
N16	Tengkera	Goh Leong San	GR (DAP)
N17	Durian Daun	Yew Kok Kee	GR (DAP)
N18	Bandar Hilir	Sim Tong Him	GR (DAP)
N19	Duyong	Gan Boon Leong	BN (MCA)
N20	Alai	Nasir Manap	BN (UMNO)
N21	Ayer Panas	Chong Tam On	BN (MCA)
N22	Rim	Dolah Atan	BN (UMNO)
N23	Merlimau	Abu Zahar Ithnin	BN (UMNO)
N24	Serkam	Ahmad Hamzah	BN (UMNO)
N25	Sungai Rambai	Abdul Azis Abdul Ghani	BN (UMNO)

== Johor ==
No.	State constituency	Member	Party
BN 40
N01	Sepinang	Othman Jais	BN (UMNO)
N02	Jementah	Gan Lian Keng @ Lee Ah Kau	BN (MCA)
N03	Tangkak	Yap Chik Dong	BN (MCA)
N04	Serom	Abdul Ghani Othman	BN (UMNO)
N05	Bukit Serampang	Ahmad Omar	BN (UMNO)
N06	Jorak	Sabariah Ahmad	BN (UMNO)
N07	Tenang	Bahari Haron	BN (UMNO)
N08	Bekok	Tan Kok Hong @ Tan Yi	BN (MCA)
N09	Endau	Abdul Latiff Ahmad	BN (UMNO)
N10	Tenggaroh	Krishnasamy Shiman	BN (MIC)
N11	Paloh	Choong Ah Onn @ Chong Ah Owon	BN (MCA)
N12	Mengkibol	Ng Kim Lai	BN (MCA)
N13	Sri Medan	Atikah Abdullah	BN (UMNO)
N14	Semerah	Tan Teck Poh @ Tan Ah Too	BN (MCA)
N15	Bukit Naning	Masiran Elias	BN (UMNO)
N16	Maharani	Tay Khim Seng	BN (MCA)
N17	Parit Bakar	Malek Munip	BN (UMNO)
N18	Sungai Balang	Muntaha Kailan	BN (UMNO)
N19	Parit Yaani	Mohamad Aziz	BN (UMNO)
N20	Parit Raja	Zahar Bachik	BN (UMNO)
N21	Penggaram	Chua Soi Lek	BN (MCA)
N22	Rengit	Zainal Abidin Mohamed Zin	BN (UMNO)
N23	Panti	Asmaon Ismail	BN (UMNO)
N24	Gunung Lambak	Halimah Mohamed Sadique	BN (UMNO)
N25	Simpang Renggam	Law Boon King @ Low Boon Hong	BN (MCA)
N26	Benut	Saklon @ Salehon Sengot	BN (UMNO)
N27	Kulai	Khoo Che Wat	BN (Gerakan)
N28	Bukit Permai	Adam Abdul Hamid	BN (UMNO)
N29	Sedili	Mohamadon Abu Bakar	BN (UMNO)
N30	Pengerang	Hasmoni Salim	BN (UMNO)
N31	Tiram	Ali Hassan	BN (UMNO)
N32	Pasir Gudang	K. S. Balakrishan	BN (MIC)
N33	Tanjong Puteri	Mohamad Kasbi	BN (UMNO)
N34	Stulang	Freddie Long Hoo Hin @ Long Ah Mui	BN (MCA)
N35	Tambatan	Low Teh Hian	BN (MCA)
N36	Kempas	Abdul Kadir Annuar	BN (UMNO)
N37	Tanjong Kupang	Baharom Ab Ghani	BN (UMNO)
N38	Skudai	Wong Siew Poh	BN (Gerakan)
N39	Pulai Sebatang	Khatijah Md. Som	BN (UMNO)
N40	Kukup	Ahmad Abdullah	BN (UMNO)

== Sabah ==
=== 1994–1999 ===
No.	State constituency	Member	Party
PBS 25 | BN 23
N01	Banggi	Amir Kahar Mustapha	GR (PBS)
N02	Kudat	Kong Fo Min @ Kong Hong Ming	BN (LDP)
N03	Bengkoka	Masrani Parman	BN (UMNO)
N04	Matunggong	Markus Majihi	GR (PBS)
N05	Tandek	Saibul Supu	GR (PBS)
N06	Langkon	Maximus Ongkili	GR (PBS)
N07	Tempasuk	Pandikar Amin Mulia	BN (UMNO)
N08	Usukan	Salleh Said Keruak	BN (UMNO)
N09	Kadamaian	Banggai Basirun	GR (PBS)
N10	Tamparuli	Wilfred Bumburing	GR (PBS)
N11	Sulaman	Hajiji Noor	BN (UMNO)
N12	Kiulu	Gisin Lombut	GR (PBS)
N13	Kundasang	Ewon Ebin	GR (PBS)
N14	Ranau	Siringan Gubat	GR (PBS)
N15	Sugut	Surady Kayong	BN (UMNO)
N16	Labuk	Tan Yung Hi @ Tan Yong Gee	GR (PBS)
N17	Sungai Sibuga	Musa Aman	BN (UMNO)
N18	Elopura	Tham Nyip Shen	BN (SAPP)
N19	Tanjong Papat	Raymond Tan Shu Kiah	BN (SAPP)
N20	Karamunting	Lau Pui Keong	GR (PBS)
N21	Sekong	Nahalan Damsal	BN (UMNO)
N22	Sukau	Aklee Abass	BN (UMNO)
N23	Kuamut	Joseph Sitin Saang	GR (PBS)
N24	Tambunan	Joseph Pairin Kitingan	GR (PBS)
N25	Bingkor	Jeffrey Kitingan	GR (PBS)
N26	Moyog	Bernard Giluk Dompok	GR (PBS)
N27	Inanam	Stephen Kinson Kutai @ Joni Bilingan	GR (PBS)
N28	Likas	Yong Teck Lee	BN (SAPP)
N29	Api-Api	Chau Tet On	GR (PBS)
N30	Sembulan	Chow Chin Thong @ Chau Chin Tang	GR (PBS)
N31	Petagas	Yahyah Hussin	BN (UMNO)
N32	Kawang	Osu Sukam	BN (UMNO)
N33	Buang Sayang	Abdul Rahim Ismail	BN (UMNO)
N34	Bongawan	Karim Bujang	BN (UMNO)
N35	Kuala Penyu	Wences Anggang	GR (PBS)
N36	Klias	Lajim Ukin	GR (PBS)
N37	Lumadan	Dayang Mahani Pengiran Ahmad Raffae	BN (UMNO)
N38	Sipitang	Sapawi Ahmad	BN (UMNO)
N39	Tenom	Kadoh Agundong	GR (PBS)
N40	Kemabong	Rubin Balang	GR (PBS)
N41	Sook	Joseph Kurup	GR (PBS)
N42	Nabawan	Adut Sigoh @ Joe Said Besar	GR (PBS)
N43	Merotai	Abdul Ghapur Salleh	BN (UMNO)
N44	Sri Tanjong	Michael Lim Sun Yang	GR (PBS)
N45	Lahad Datu	Mohamad Yusuf Amat Jamlee	BN (UMNO)
N46	Kunak	Unding Lana	BN (UMNO)
N47	Balung	Abdul Manan Jakasa	BN (UMNO)
N48	Sulabayan	Nasir Sakaran from 28 January 1995	BN (UMNO)
N48	Sulabayan	Sakaran Dandai until 27 December 1994	BN (UMNO)

== Sarawak ==
=== 1996–2001 ===
No.	State constituency	Member	Party
BN 57 | DAP 3 | IND 2
N01	Tanjong Datu	Ramsay Noel Jitam	BN (SUPP)
N02	Tasik Biru	Peter Nansian Ngusie	BN (SNAP)
N03	Pantai Damai	Sharifah Mordiah Tuanku Fauzi	BN (PBB)
N04	Demak Laut	Abang Draup Zamahari Abang Zen	BN (PBB)
N05	Tupong	Daud Abdul Rahman	BN (PBB)
N06	Satok	Abang Abdul Rahman Zohari Abang Openg	BN (PBB)
N07	Samariang	Dona Babel	BN (PBB)
N08	Padungan	Song Swee Guan	BN (SUPP)
N09	Pending	Sim Kheng Hui	BN (SUPP)
N10	Batu Lintang	Chan Seng Khai	BN (SUPP)
N11	Batu Kawah	Alfred Yap Chin Loi	BN (SUPP)
N12	Asajaya	Abdul Taib Mahmud	BN (PBB)
N13	Muara Tuang	Adenan Satem	BN (PBB)
N14	Bengoh	William Tanyuh	BN (SUPP)
N15	Tarat	Roland Sagah Wee Inn	BN (PBB)
N16	Tebedu	Michael Manyin Jawong	BN (PBB)
N17	Kedup	Frederick Bayoi Manggie	BN (PBB)
N18	Sadong Jaya	Wan Abdul Wahab Wan Sanusi	BN (PBB)
N19	Simunjan	Mohd. Naroden Majais	BN (PBB)
N20	Sebuyau	Julaihi Narawi	BN (PBB)
N21	Beting Maro	Bolhassan Di	BN (PBB)
N22	Bukit Begunan	Mong Dagang recontest, won on 15 March 1997	BN (PBDS)
N23	Simanggang	Francis Harden Hollis	BN (SUPP)
N24	Engkilili	Toh Heng San	BN (SUPP)
N25	Batang Ai	Dublin Unting Ingkot	BN (PBDS)
N26	Saribas	Wahbi Junaidi	BN (PBB)
N27	Layar	Alfred Jabu Numpang	BN (PBB)
N28	Kalaka	Abdul Wahab Aziz	BN (PBB)
N29	Krian	Peter Nyarok Entrie	BN (SNAP)
N30	Belawai	Hamden Ahmad	BN (PBB)
N31	Serdeng	Mohamad Asfia Awang Nassar	BN (PBB)
N32	Matu-Daro	Abdul Wahab Dolah	BN (PBB)
N33	Meradong	Yii Chu Lik	IND
N34	Repok	David Teng Lung Chi	BN (SUPP)
N35	Pakan	William Mawan Ikom	BN (SNAP)
N36	Meluan	Geman Itam	BN (SNAP)
N37	Ngemah	Gabriel Adit Demong	BN (PBDS)
N38	Machan	Gramong Juna	BN (PBB)
N39	Bukit Assek	Wong Ho Leng	DAP
N40	Dudong	Soon Choon Teck	BN (SUPP)
N41	Bawang Assan	Wong Soon Koh	BN (SUPP)
N42	Pelawan	Wong Sing Nang	DAP
N43	Nangka	Awang Bemee Awang Ali Basah	BN (PBB)
N44	Dalat	Mohd Effendi Norwawi	BN (PBB)
N45	Balingian	Abdul Ajis Abdul Majeed	BN (PBB)
N46	Tamin	Joseph Entulu Belaun	BN (PBDS)
N47	Kakus	John Sikie Tayai	BN (PBDS)
N48	Pelagus	Sng Chee Hua	BN (PBDS)
N49	Katibas	Ambrose Blikau Enturan	BN (PBB)
N50	Baleh	James Jemut Masing	BN (PBDS)
N51	Belaga	Stanley Ajang Batok	BN (PBDS)
N52	Kemena	Celestine Ujang Jilan recontest, won on 24 May 1997	BN (PBB)
N53	Kidurong	Wong Sing Ai until 12 September 1997	DAP
N53	Kidurong	Michael Sim Kiam Hui from 25 October 1997	BN (SUPP)
N54	Jepak	Talib Zulpilip	BN (PBB)
N55	Lambir	Swin Jemaah @ Aidan Wing	BN (PBB)
N56	Piasau	George Chan Hong Nam	BN (SUPP)
N57	Senadin	Lee Kim Sin	BN (SUPP)
N58	Marudi	Sylvester Entrie Muran	BN (SNAP)
N59	Telang Usan	Kebing Wan	IND
N60	Limbang	James Wong Kim Min	BN (SNAP)
N61	Lawas	Awang Tengah Ali Hasan	BN (PBB)
N62	Ba'kelalan	Judson Sakai Tagal	BN (SNAP)
