= Speaker of the Malacca State Legislative Assembly =

Presiding officer of the legislature of Malacca

- Yang di-Pertua Dewan Undangan Negeri Melaka
- Coat of arms of Malacca
- Incumbent; Ibrahim Durum since 27 December 2021
- Malacca State Legislative Assembly
- Style: Yang Berhormat; Tuan Yang di-Pertua (formal); Tuan Speaker/Tuan Pengerusi (informal and within the assembly)
- Member of: Committee of Rights and Freedoms, Committee of House Management Select, Committee of the Standing Rules State Assembly
- Reports to: Malacca State Legislative Assembly
- Seat: Blok Laksamana, Seri Negeri complex, Hang Tuah Jaya, Ayer Keroh, Malacca
- Appointer: Elected by members of the Malacca State Legislative Assembly
- Term length: Elected at the start of each Malacca State Legislative Assembly, upon a vacancy
- Constituting instrument: Constitution of Malacca
- Inaugural holder: Goh Kay Seng
- Formation: 23 May 1959; 67 years ago
- Deputy: Deputy Speaker of the Malacca State Legislative Assembly
- Website: www.melaka.gov.my

The Speaker of the Malacca State Legislative Assembly is the highest-ranking presiding officer in the Malacca State Legislative Assembly, the unicameral legislature of the Malaysian state of Malacca. They are responsible for convening sessions of the state's legislative body, organising debates, and examining the admissibility of petitions, bills and amendments. In the absence of the Speaker, the deputy will take their place. The speaker is selected through ballot in the first session of a new legislative assembly.

The incumbent Speaker is Ibrahim Durum. He was elected since 27 December 2021.

== Election ==
The Malacca State Legislative Assembly may from time to time elect a person of eligibility to become a Speaker of the assembly. A speaker may not be elected to be a Speaker unless he is a member or qualified to be a member of the legislative assembly. The speaker may resign at any time. He must vacate his office when either the legislative assembly first meet after a general election, or upon being disqualified to be a speaker, or upon the dissolution of the assembly, or on his ceasing to be a member of assembly other than because of the dissolution of the legislative assembly or ceased to be qualified of a member. A Deputy Speaker may also be chosen from any member of the legislative assembly.

== List of Speakers of the Malacca State Legislative Assembly ==
The following is the list of Speakers of the State Legislative Assembly since 1959:

Colour key (for political parties):
Alliance / Barisan Nasional Pakatan Harapan

No.	Portrait	Name (Birth–Death) (Constituency)	Term of office			Party (Note: This column names only the Speaker's party. The state legislaltive assembly he heads may be a complex coalition of several parties and independents; those are not listed here.)	Election	Assembly
No.	Portrait	Name (Birth–Death) (Constituency)	Took office	Left office	Time in office	Party	Election	Assembly
1.		Goh Kay Seng (?–?); MLA for Kota Barat	23 May 1959	29 February 1964	4 years, 283 days	Alliance (MCA)	1959	1st
2.		Datuk Haji; Talib Karim (?–?); MLA for Alor Gajah	21 May 1964	5 October 1967	3 years, 138 days	Alliance (UMNO)	1964	2nd
3.		Datuk Haji; Mohd Abd Rahman (?–?); MLA for Batu Berendam	20 November 1967	19 March 1969	1 year, 120 days	Alliance (UMNO)	–	2nd
4.		Datuk Haji; Ahmad Manap (?–?); MLA for Tanjong Kling; MLA for Sungei Udang	7 April 1971	11 June 1978	7 years, 66 days	Alliance (UMNO)	1969	3rd
4.		Datuk Haji; Ahmad Manap (?–?); MLA for Tanjong Kling; MLA for Sungei Udang	7 April 1971	11 June 1978	7 years, 66 days	BN (UMNO)	1974	4th
5.		Datuk Haji; Abdul Aziz Tapa (?–?); MLA for Nyalas	15 September 1978	28 March 1982	3 years, 195 days	BN (UMNO)	1978	5th
6.		Datuk; Abdul Razak Alias (?–?); MLA for Taboh Naning	31 May 1982	19 July 1986	4 years, 50 days	BN (UMNO)	1982	6th
7.		Datuk; Abu Zahar Ithnin (1937–2013); MLA for Sungai Rambai	4 August 1986	19 October 1994	8 years, 77 days	BN (UMNO)	1986	7th
7.		Datuk; Abu Zahar Ithnin (1937–2013); MLA for Sungai Rambai	4 August 1986	19 October 1994	8 years, 77 days	BN (UMNO)	1990	8th
8.		Datuk Haji; Jaafar Lajis (?–?); MLA for Rim	25 October 1994	5 April 1995	163 days	BN (UMNO)	–	8th
9.		Datuk Haji; Nasir Manap (?–?); MLA for Alai	8 June 1995	December; 1999	4 years	BN (UMNO)	1995	9th
10.		Datuk Wira; Amid Nordin (?–?); MLA for Alai	December; 1999	March; 2004	5 years	BN (UMNO)	1999	10th
11.		Datuk Wira Haji; Mo'min Abd Aziz (?–?); Non-MLA	March; 2004	April; 2008	4 years	BN (UMNO)	2004	11th
12.		Datuk Wira Haji; Othman Muhamad (?–?); Non-MLA	April; 2008	April; 2018	10 years	BN (UMNO)	2008	12th
12.		Datuk Wira Haji; Othman Muhamad (?–?); Non-MLA	April; 2008	April; 2018	10 years	BN (UMNO)	2013	13th
13.		Datuk Wira; Omar Jaafar (b.?); Non-MLA	19 July 2018	11 May 2020	1 year, 298 days	PH (PKR)	2018	14th
14.		Datuk Seri; Ab Rauf Yusoh (b.1961); Non-MLA	11 May 2020	4 October 2021	1 year, 147 days	BN (UMNO)	–	14th
15.		Datuk Wira; Ibrahim Durum (b.1986); Non-MLA	27 December 2021	Incumbent	4 years, 256 days	BN (UMNO)	2021	15th

== See also ==
- Malacca
- Malacca State Legislative Assembly
