= Omar Jaafar =

Malaysian politician

Yang Berbahagia Datuk Wira Omar Jaafar DCSM
- عمر بن جعفر

13th Speaker of the Malacca State Legislative Assembly
- In office 19 July 2018 – 11 May 2020
- Governor: Mohd Khalil Yaakob
- Chief Minister: Adly Zahari; Sulaiman Md Ali
- Deputy: Wong Fort Pin
- Preceded by: Othman Muhamad
- Succeeded by: Ab Rauf Yusoh
- Constituency: Non-MLA (Pakatan Harapan)

Personal details
- Born: 27 October 1941 (age 84) Malacca, Japanese occupation of Malaya
- Party: People's Justice Party (PKR)
- Other political affiliations: Pakatan Harapan (PH)
- Occupation: Politician

Omar bin Jaafar is a Malaysian politician and former Speaker of the Malacca State Legislative Assembly.

== Election results ==
Malacca State Legislative Assembly
Year	Constituency	Candidate	Votes	Pct	Opponent(s)	Votes	Pct	Ballots cast	Majority	Turnout%
1999	N21 Ayer Panas	Omar Jaafar (keADILan)	2,825	37.48%	Chong Tam On (MCA)	4,713	62.52%	7,757	1,888	76.05%

== Honours ==
- Malacca
  - Knight Commander of the Exalted Order of Malacca (DCSM) – Datuk Wira (2018)
