= Keramat (state constituency) =

Selangor constituency

Defunct state constituency
- Legislature: Selangor State Legislative Assembly
- Constituency created: 1984
- Constituency abolished: 1995
- First contested: 1986
- Last contested: 1990

Keramat was a state constituency in Selangor, Malaysia, that was represented in the Selangor State Legislative Assembly from 1986 to 1995.

The state constituency was created in the 1984 redistribution and was mandated to return a single member to the Selangor State Legislative Assembly under the first past the post voting system.

== History ==
It was abolished in 1995 when it was redistributed.

=== Representation history ===
Members of the Legislative Assembly for Keramat
Assembly	No	Years	Member	Party
Constituency created from Ampang
7th	N20	1986-1990	Mufti Suib	BN (UMNO)
8th	N20	1990-1995	Mufti Suib	BN (UMNO)
Constituency abolished, split into Ampang and Lembah Jaya

== Election results ==
Selangor state election, 1990
Party	Candidate	Votes	%	∆%
BN	Mufti Suib	12,428	64.40	▼0.09
S46	Ibrahim Abdullah	6,870	35.60	▲35.60
Total valid votes		19,298	100.00	
Total rejected ballots		447		
Unreturned ballots		0		
Turnout		19,745	72.30	▲9.72
Registered electors		27,311		
Majority		5,558	28.80	▼9.38
BN hold		Swing		

Selangor state election, 1986
Party	Candidate	Votes	%
BN	Mufti Suib	8,175	64.49
DAP	Yap Hon Chu	3,335	26.31
PAS	Ajus Jais	1,166	9.20
Total valid votes		12,676	100.00
Total rejected ballots		244	
Unreturned ballots		0	
Turnout		12,920	62.58
Registered electors		20,647	
Majority		4,840	38.18
This was a new constituency created.
