= Ab Rauf Yusoh =

Malaysian politician

Yang Amat Berhormat Datuk Seri Utama Dr. Ab Rauf Yusoh PJN DUNM SSAP DGSM DCSM DMSM JP MLA
- اب رؤوف يوسف
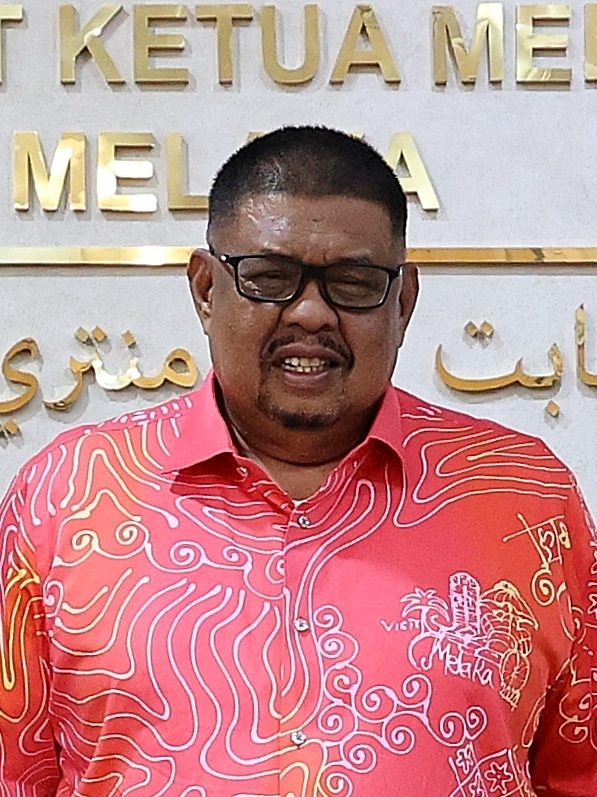
- Ab Rauf in 2026

13th Chief Minister of Malacca
- Incumbent
- Assumed office 31 March 2023
- Governor: Mohd Ali Rustam
- Preceded by: Sulaiman Md Ali
- Constituency: Tanjung Bidara

Senior Member of the Malacca State Executive Council
- In office 26 November 2021 – 31 March 2023 (Investment, Industry, Entrepreneur Development and Cooperatives)
- Governor: Mohd Ali Rustam
- Chief Minister: Sulaiman Md Ali
- Preceded by: Sulaiman Md Ali (Chief Minister, Investment and Industry); Norhizam Hassan Baktee (Member, Entrepreneur Development and Cooperatives)
- Succeeded by: Himself (Chief Minister, Investment and Industry); Allex Seah Shoo Chin (Member, Entrepreneur Development and Cooperatives)
- Constituency: Tanjung Bidara

14th Speaker of the Malacca State Legislative Assembly
- In office 11 May 2020 – 4 October 2021
- Governor: Mohd Khalil Yaakob (2020); Mohd Ali Rustam (2020–2021)
- Deputy: Ghazale Muhamad
- Chief Minister: Sulaiman Md Ali
- Preceded by: Omar Jaafar
- Succeeded by: Ibrahim Durum

State Chairman of the Barisan Nasional of Malacca
- Incumbent
- Assumed office 14 July 2018
- National Chairman: Ahmad Zahid Hamidi
- Preceded by: Idris Haron

State Chairman of the United Malays National Organisation of Malacca
- Incumbent
- Assumed office 14 July 2018
- President: Ahmad Zahid Hamidi
- Deputy: Mohamad Ali Mohamad (2018–2023); Rais Yasin (since 2023)
- Preceded by: Idris Haron

Member of the Malacca State Legislative Assembly for Tanjung Bidara
- Incumbent
- Assumed office 20 November 2021
- Preceded by: Md Rawi Mahmud (BN–UMNO)
- Majority: 364 (2021); 8,615 (2026)

Faction represented in Malacca State Legislative Assembly
- 2021–: Barisan Nasional

Personal details
- Born: Ab Rauf bin Yusoh; 20 September 1961 (age 65) Masjid Tanah, Malacca, Federation of Malaya (now Malaysia)
- Party: United Malays National Organisation (UMNO)
- Other political affiliations: Barisan Nasional (BN)
- Education: Universiti Kebangsaan Malaysia (PhD)
- Ab Rauf Yusoh on Facebook

Ab Rauf bin Yusoh (Jawi: اب رؤوف بن يوسف; born 20 September 1961) is a Malaysian politician who has served as the 13th chief minister of Malacca since 2023. A member of UMNO, he served as the party's state chairman since 2018 and as member of Malacca State Legislative Assembly for Tanjung Bidara since 2021.

He served as Senior Member of the Malacca State Executive Council (EXCO) in the Barisan Nasional (BN) state administration under former Chief Minister Sulaiman Md Ali from November 2021 to his promotion to the chief ministership in March 2023 and Speaker of the Malacca State Legislative Assembly from May 2020 to October 2021. He is a Member of Supreme Council and Division Chief of Masjid Tanah of UMNO, a component party of the BN coalition.

== Political career ==
=== Speaker of the Malacca State Legislative Assembly (2020–2021) ===
On 11 May 2020, Ab Rauf was elected as Speaker of the Malacca State Legislative Assembly to replace Omar Jaafar of PH after BN took over the state administration from PH on 9 March 2020. On 4 November 2021, he announced that the assembly had been dissolved after Chief Minister Sulaiman lost the majority support in the assembly due to the withdrawal support for him as Chief Minister by 4 MLAs.

=== Member of the Malacca State Legislative Assembly (since 2021) ===
In the 2021 Malacca state election, Ab Rauf made his electoral debut and was nominated by BN to contest for the Tanjung Bidara seat replacing the retiring MLA Md Rawi Mahmud. In the tightly contested election, he garnered 3,559 votes in total and narrowly defeated Perikatan Nasional (PN) candidate Mas Ermieyati Samsudin who was also the Deputy Minister in the Prime Minister's Department in charge of Parliament and Law as well as Member of Parliament (MP) for Masjid Tanah by a slim majority of only 364 votes.

=== Senior Member of the Malacca State Executive Council (2021–2023) ===
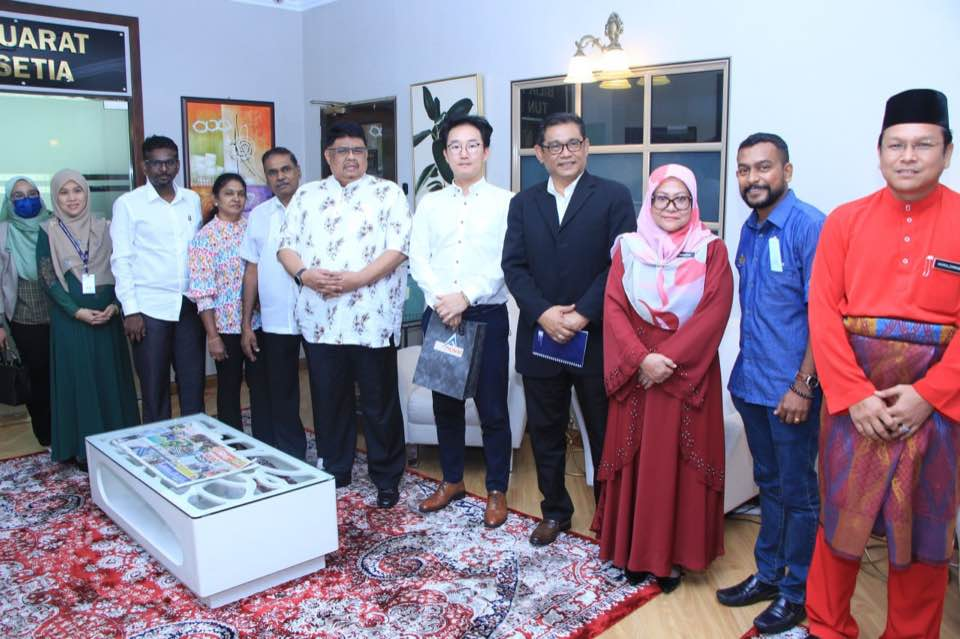
Ab Rauf seen here with the delegation from Royal Eco Train Development Co Ltd (RETD Korea) whilst serving as the Senior EXCO Member of Malacca.

On 26 November 2021, Chief Minister Sulaiman appointed Ab Rauf as a Senior EXCO member for the portfolios of Investment, Industry, Entrepreneur Development and Cooperatives. As the only Senior EXCO member, Ab Rauf was the de facto Deputy Chief Minister and second most powerful person in the state government after Sulaiman. As the Senior EXCO member, Ab Rauf worked closely with the governmental organisations of the state such as Malacca State Economic Planning Unit (SEPU or UPEN), Malaysia Investment and Development Authority (MIDA), Malacca State Development Corporation (MSDC or PKNM) as well as other local and international private companies and corporations. He also helped the state to secure various development projects and direct investments. Among the notable ones is the light rapid transit (LRT) railway network that applies the Magnetic Levitation (MagLev) technology and connects all the districts of the state.

=== Chief Minister of Malacca (since 2023) ===
==== Forming the EXCO and state government ====
On 31 March 2023, Ab Rauf was sworn in and appointed as the 13th Chief Minister of Malacca to take over Sulaiman who was confirmed to resign as Chief Minister two days ago on 29 March 2023. There were frequent speculations and rumours that Sulaiman was forced to resign as Chief Minister by Ab Rauf as well as Ab Rauf and Sulaiman had fallen out as the former who was the Malacca BN and UMNO Chairman was not appointed as Chief Minister after the 2021 state election, breaking the convention of the leader of the largest political coalition and party being appointed as the Chief Minister. Instead, Malacca UMNO Secretary Sulaiman was reappointed. However, both have also frequently denied the speculations and rumours. Before being appointed to the position, Deputy Prime Minister and BN Chairman Ahmad Zahid Hamidi explained that the decision of Sulaiman to resign was due to his "health problems", which have been questioned by many and proposed only Ab Rauf to Yang di-Pertua Negeri of Malacca Mohd Ali Rustam to be appointed as the new Chief Minister. His appointment also met criticisms from fellow BN Rembia MLA Muhammad Jailani Khamis who labelled him a "backdoor" Chief Minister. On the criticism of Jailani who broke rank with the party not to support him, he took the "wait and see" approach before deciding on any disciplinary actions against Jailani and urged him not to be a "hero" who get cheap political publicity by breaking rank with the party and criticising him. On the possibility of forming a coalition government with Pakatan Harapan (PH) by appointing PH MLAs to his EXCO, similar to the coalition government at the federal level, Ab Rauf added that he had yet to receive an indication from the central leadership of his party. He assured that his EXCO line-up would be finalised and unveiled in two days after discussions on it with Ahmad Zahid. He also pledged to make Malacca an investor-friendly state. He also noted that Malacca is the most politically stable state in Malaysia given that BN had gained a landslide victory in the 2021 state election. He characterised his upcoming EXCO lineup as inclusive and reflective of the coalition government at the federal level, indirectly confirming that his EXCO would consist of BN and PH MLAs and described it as pro-business and pro-reform. Ahmad Zahid also indirectly confirmed it. On 1 April 2023, Ab Rauf directly confirmed it and asked the people to expect an exemplary, appealing and attractive EXCO lineup. On 3 April 2023, Ab Rauf revealed that his EXCO will most likely be sworn in and appointed two days later on 5 April 2023 and the lineup had been accepted by Ahmad Zahid on 2 April 2023. On 5 April 2023, his EXCO was sworn in. He retained 7 EXCO members of the Sulaiman II EXCO and appointed three new EXCO members. The lineup consists of 10 BN MLAs and only 1 PH MLA. He also promoted Malacca UMNO Deputy Chairman Rais Yasin to Senior EXCO Member, a rank previously held by him, effectively making him the de facto Deputy Chief Minister and second most powerful person in the state government of Malacca after Ab Rauf and announced the reestablishment of the position of Deputy EXCO Member that was abolished in 2018. He added that the 10 EXCO members would have a deputy respectively and the 10 Deputy EXCO members were to be unveiled on 6 April 2023. He also rubbished the allegations that the appointments of Deputy EXCO Members are wastes of resources and money as he wanted all MLAs to be given roles to work with him on developing the state. On 6 April 2023, he demoted Low Chee Leong and Zaidi Attan to Deputy EXCO Members. Both of them previously served as EXCO Members. Demotion is rare in the Malaysian politics. After announcing the lineup of Deputy EXCO Members, he invited the two Opposition and PN MLAs to join his government in an effort to form a unity government, which is a government that has no opposition and comprises all Malacca MLAs. If it is done, it would be the first ever unity government in Malacca and Malaysia. He also added that he preferred finding similarities with Jailani than taking action against him. However, on 7 April 2023, his invitation was turned down by State Leader of the Opposition Mohd Yadzil Yaakub as they would like to check and balance the state government and not cross over for personal interests.

== Election results ==
Malacca State Legislative Assembly
Year	Constituency	Candidate	Votes	Pct	Opponent(s)	Votes	Pct	Ballots cast	Majority	Turnout
2021	N02 Tanjung Bidara	Ab Rauf Yusoh (UMNO)	3,559	49.14%	Mas Ermieyati Samsudin (BERSATU)	3,195	44.11%	7,243	364	71.48%
2021	N02 Tanjung Bidara	Ab Rauf Yusoh (UMNO)	3,559	49.14%	Zainal Hassan (PKR)	489	6.75%	7,243	364	71.48%
2026	N02 Tanjung Bidara	Ab Rauf Yusoh (UMNO)	10,079	87.32%	Mohd Yunazri Mustamiri (PKR)	1,464	12.68%	11,543	8,615	76.94%

== Honours ==
- Malaysia
  - Commander of the Order of Meritorious Service (PJN) – Datuk (2009)
- Malacca
  - Grand Principal of the Premier and Exalted Order of Malacca (DUNM) – Datuk Seri Utama (2023)
  - Grand Commander of the Exalted Order of Malacca (DGSM) – Datuk Seri (2017)
  - Commander of the Exalted Order of Malacca (DCSM) – Datuk Wira (2013)
  - Companion of the Exalted Order of Malacca (DMSM) – Datuk (2003)
  - Justice of the Peace (JP) (2011)
- Pahang
  - Grand Companion of the Order of Sultan Ahmad Shah of Pahang (SSAP) – Dato' Sri (2015)

Political offices
Preceded by Sulaiman Md Ali	13th Chief Minister of Malacca; 2023 – current	Incumbent
