= Ibrahim Durum =

Malaysian politician

Yang Berhormat Datuk Wira Haji Ibrahim Durum DCSM DMSM JP
- إبراهيم دوروم

15th Speaker of the Malacca State Legislative Assembly
- Incumbent
- Assumed office 27 December 2021
- Governor: Mohd Ali Rustam
- Deputy: Khaidhirah Abu Zahar (2021–2023); Kerk Chee Yee (2023–2026)
- Chief Minister: Sulaiman Md Ali (2021–2023); Ab Rauf Yusoh (since 2023)
- Preceded by: Ab Rauf Yusoh
- Constituency: Non-MLA

Member of the Melaka State Legislative Assembly for Kuala Linggi
- In office 21 October 1990 – 21 March 2004
- Preceded by: Bahari Hassan (BN–UMNO)
- Succeeded by: Abdul Rahman Palit (BN–UMNO)
- Majority: 4,509 (1990); 4,631 (1995); 2,427 (1999)

Faction represented in Malacca State Legislative Assembly
- 1990–2004: Barisan Nasional

Personal details
- Born: 29 May 1953 (age 73) Malacca, Federation of Malaya
- Citizenship: Malaysian
- Party: United Malays National Organisation (UMNO)
- Other political affiliations: Barisan Nasional (BN)
- Occupation: Politician

Ibrahim bin Durum is a Malaysian politician who has served as Speaker of the Malacca State Legislative Assembly since December 2021. He served as Member of the Malacca State Legislative Assembly (MLA) for Kuala Linggi from October 1990 to March 2004. He is a member of the United Malays National Organisation (UMNO), a component party of the Barisan Nasional (BN) coalition.

== Election results ==
Malacca State Legislative Assembly
| Year | Constituency | Candidate | Votes | Pct | Opponent(s) | Votes | Pct | Ballots cast | Majority | Turnout |
|---|---|---|---|---|---|---|---|---|---|---|
| 1990 | N01 Kuala Linggi | Ibrahim Durum (UMNO) | 5,599 | 83.70% | Ishak Atan (S46) | 1,090 | 16.30% | 6,882 | 4,509 | 78.09% |
| 1995 | N01 Kuala Linggi | Ibrahim Durum (UMNO) | 5,269 | 85.08% | Md Ali Bagus (PAS) | 638 | 10.30% | 6,325 | 4,631 | 77.81% |
| 1995 | N01 Kuala Linggi | Ibrahim Durum (UMNO) | 5,269 | 85.08% | Ishak Atan (S46) | 286 | 4.62% | 6,325 | 4,631 | 77.81% |
| 1999 | N01 Kuala Linggi | Ibrahim Durum (UMNO) | 4,478 | 68.58% | Julasapiyah Kassim (PAS) | 2,051 | 31.41% | 6,749 | 2,427 | 79.07% |

== Honours ==
- Malacca
  - Knight Commander of the Exalted Order of Malacca (DCSM) – Datuk Wira (2020)
  - Companion Class I of the Exalted Order of Malacca (DMSM) – Datuk (1994)
  - Justice of the Peace (JP) (2005)
