= Beranang (state constituency) =

Selangor constituency

Defunct state constituency
- Legislature: Selangor State Legislative Assembly
- Constituency created: 1994
- Constituency abolished: 2004
- First contested: 1995
- Last contested: 1999

Beranang was a state constituency in Selangor, Malaysia, that was represented in the Selangor State Legislative Assembly from 1995 to 2004.

The state constituency was created in the 1994 redistribution and was mandated to return a single member to the Selangor State Legislative Assembly under the first past the post voting system.

== History ==
It was abolished in 2004 when it was redistributed.

=== Representation history ===
Members of the Legislative Assembly for Beranang
Assembly	Years	Member	Party
Constituency created from Semenyih
9th	1995-1999	Shoib Md. Silin	BN (UMNO)
10th	1999-2004	Ahmad Kuris Mohd Nor	BN (UMNO)
Constituency abolished, renamed to Semenyih

== Election results ==
Selangor state election, 1999
Party	Candidate	Votes	%	∆%
BN	Ahmad Kuris Mohd Nor	8,760	58.92	
PAS	Zainudin Lapoh	6,108	41.08	
Total valid votes		14,868	100.00	
Total rejected ballots		369		
Unreturned ballots		3		
Turnout		15,240	74.03	
Registered electors		20,585		
Majority		2,652		
BN hold		Swing		

Selangor state election, 1995
Party	Candidate	Votes	%	∆%
BN	Shoib Md. Silin	10,242	76.30	
S46	Johari Ismail	1,595	11.88	
Independent	Kamaruddin Mohd Isa	1,587	11.82	
Total valid votes		13,424	100.00	
Total rejected ballots		470		
Unreturned ballots		53		
Turnout		13,947	72.00	
Registered electors		19,370		
Majority		8,647		
This was a new constituency created.
