= Jenderak =

Political subdivision in Malaysia

Jenderak (N27)
Pahang constituency

State constituency
- Legislature: Pahang State Legislative Assembly
MLA
Rodzuan Zaaba
BN
- Constituency created: 1959
- First contested: 1959
- Last contested: 2022

Demographics
- Electors (2022): 13,994

Jenderak is a state constituency in Pahang, Malaysia, that has been represented in the Pahang State Legislative Assembly.

== Demographics ==
Ethnic breakdown of Jenderak's electorate as of 2022
1. Malay (67.7%)
2. Other ethnicities (22.1%)
3. Chinese (6.59%)
4. Indian (3.66%)

== History ==
=== Polling districts ===
According to the federal gazette issued on 31 October 2022, the Jenderak constituency is divided into 11 polling districts.

State constituency	Polling Districts	Code	Location
Jenderak (N27）	Kampung Pian	087/27/01	Dewan Orang Ramai Kampung Pian
Jenderak (N27）	Sungai Mai	087/27/02	Dewan Orang Ramai Kampung Gong Halt dan Balai Raya Kampung Gong Halt
Jenderak (N27）	Kuala Mai	087/27/03	SK Kuala Mai Bharu
Jenderak (N27）	Paya Luas	087/27/04	SK Paya Luas
Jenderak (N27）	Kuala Krau	087/27/05	SJK (C) Kuala Krau
Jenderak (N27）	FELDA Jenderak Utara	087/27/06	SK LKTP Jenderak Utara
Jenderak (N27）	Kampung Jenderak	087/27/07	SK Jenderak
Jenderak (N27）	Kampung Dato Shariff	087/27/08	Dewan Serbaguna Kampung Dato' Sharif Ahmad
Jenderak (N27）	FELDA Jenderak Selatan	087/28/09	SK LKTP Jenderak Selatan
Jenderak (N27）	Paya Pelong	087/27/10	Balai Raya Kampung Paya Pelong
Jenderak (N27）	Penderas	087/27/11	SK Penderas

=== Representation history ===
Members of the Legislative Assembly for Jenderak
Assembly	No	Years	Name	Party
Constituency created
1st	N19	1959-1964	Mohamed Yusoff Long	Alliance (UMNO)
2nd	N19	1964-1969	Mohamed Yusoff Long	Alliance (UMNO)
		1969-1971	Assembly dissolved	
3rd	N19	1971-1973	Mohamed Yusoff Long	Alliance (UMNO)
3rd	N19	1973-1974	Mohamed Yusoff Long	BN (UMNO)
4th	N08	1974-1978	Mohamed Khairuddin Kawi	BN (UMNO)
5th	N08	1978-1982	Abdullah Hashim Mohamed Ali	BN (UMNO)
6th	N08	1982-1986	Abdullah Hashim Mohamed Ali	BN (UMNO)
7th	N22	1986-1990	Abdullah Kia	BN (UMNO)
8th	N22	1990-1995	Abdullah Kia	BN (UMNO)
9th	N25	1995-1999	Mohamed Jaafar	BN (UMNO)
10th	N25	1999-2004	Mohamed Jaafar	BN (UMNO)
11th	N27	2004-2008	Mohamed Jaafar	BN (UMNO)
12th	N27	2008-2013	Mohamed Jaafar	BN (UMNO)
13th	N27	2013-2018	Mohamed Jaafar	BN (UMNO)
14th	N27	2018-2022	Mohamed Jaafar	BN (UMNO)
15th	N27	2022–present	Rodzuan Zaaba	BN (UMNO)

== Election results ==
Pahang state election, 2022: Jenderak
Party	Candidate	Votes	%	∆%
BN	Rodzuan Zaaba	5,409	50.03	
PN	Md Anuar Daud	3,955	36.58	▲36.58
PH	Mohamad Hafez Harun	1,447	13.38	▲13.38
Total valid votes		10,811	100.00	
Total rejected ballots		231		
Unreturned ballots		12		
Turnout		11,054	78.99	
Registered electors		13,994		
Majority		1,454	13.45	
BN hold		Swing		
