= Pandan (state constituency) =

Selangor constituency

Defunct state constituency
- Legislature: Selangor State Legislative Assembly
- Constituency created: 1984
- Constituency abolished: 2004
- First contested: 1986
- Last contested: 1999

Pandan was a state constituency in Selangor, Malaysia, that was represented in the Selangor State Legislative Assembly from 1986 to 2004.

The state constituency was created in the 1984 redistribution and was mandated to return a single member to the Selangor State Legislative Assembly under the first past the post voting system.

== History ==
It was abolished in 2004 when it was redistributed.

=== Representation history ===
Members of the Legislative Assembly for Pandan
| Assembly | No | Years | Member | Party |
Constituency created from Ampang
| 7th | N21 | 1986-1990 | Mohd Fahmi Ibrahim | BN (UMNO) |
| 8th | N21 | 1990-1995 | Mad Aris Mad Yusof | BN (UMNO) |
| 9th | N20 | 1995-1999 | Mad Aris Mad Yusof | BN (UMNO) |
| 10th | N20 | 1999-2004 | Mad Aris Mad Yusof | BN (UMNO) |
Constituency abolished, split into Chempaka and Teratai

== Election results ==
Selangor state election, 1999
| Party | Candidate | Votes | % | ∆% |
|---|---|---|---|---|
| BN | Mad Aris Mad Yusof | 14,367 | 53.81 | ▼26.22 |
| PKR | Abdullah Sani Abdul Hamid | 12,333 | 46.19 | ▲46.19 |
| Total valid votes | | 26,700 | 100.00 | |
| Total rejected ballots | | 424 | | |
| Unreturned ballots | | 19 | | |
| Turnout | | 27,143 | 75.36 | ▲3.75 |
| Registered electors | | 36,018 | | |
| Majority | | 2,034 | 7.62 | ▼52.44 |
| BN hold | | Swing | | |

Selangor state election, 1995
| Party | Candidate | Votes | % | ∆% |
|---|---|---|---|---|
| BN | Mad Aris Mad Yusof | 16,861 | 80.03 | ▲23.13 |
| S46 | Mohamed Mustapha Abu | 4,207 | 19.97 | ▼23.13 |
| Total valid votes | | 21,068 | 100.00 | |
| Total rejected ballots | | 438 | | |
| Unreturned ballots | | 79 | | |
| Turnout | | 21,585 | 71.61 | ▼6.07 |
| Registered electors | | 30,143 | | |
| Majority | | 12,654 | 60.06 | ▲46.26 |
| BN hold | | Swing | | |

Selangor state election, 1990
| Party | Candidate | Votes | % | ∆% |
|---|---|---|---|---|
| BN | Mad Aris Mad Yusof | 16,689 | 56.90 | |
| S46 | Sarjat Ali | 12,641 | 43.10 | |
| Total valid votes | | 29,330 | 100.00 | |
| Total rejected ballots | | 723 | | |
| Unreturned ballots | | 144 | | |
| Turnout | | 30,197 | 77.68 | ▲77.68 |
| Registered electors | | 38,873 | | |
| Majority | | 4,048 | 13.80 | ▲13.80 |
| BN hold | | Swing | | |

Selangor state election, 1986
| Party | Candidate | Votes | % |
|---|---|---|---|
On the nomination day, Mohd Fahmi Ibrahim won uncontested.
| BN | Mohd Fahmi Ibrahim | | |
| Total valid votes | | | 100.00 |
| Total rejected ballots | | | |
| Unreturned ballots | | | |
| Turnout | | | |
| Registered electors | | | |
| Majority | | | |
This was a new constituency created.
