= Ampang (state constituency) =

Selangor constituency

Defunct state constituency
- Legislature: Selangor State Legislative Assembly
- Constituency created: 1958
- Constituency abolished: 2004
- First contested: 1959
- Last contested: 1999

Ampang was a state constituency in Selangor, Malaysia, that was represented in the Selangor State Legislative Assembly from 1959 to 2004.

The state constituency was created in the 1958 redistribution and was mandated to return a single member to the Selangor State Legislative Assembly under the first past the post voting system.

== History ==
It was abolished in 1986 when it was redistributed. It was re-created in 1994.

=== Representation history ===
Members of the Legislative Assembly for Ampang
Assembly	No	Years	Member	Party
Constituency created
1st	N11	1959-1964	Muhyeeddin Mohamed Zakaria	Alliance (UMNO)
2nd	N11	1964-1969	Muhyeeddin Mohamed Zakaria	Alliance (UMNO)
		1969-1971	Assembly dissolved	
3rd	N11	1971-1974	Wong Swee Oy (黃瑞霖)	DAP
4th	N15	1974-1978	Lim Heng Kiap (林廷甲)	BN (MCA)
5th	N15	1978-1982	Tan Kui Sui @ Tan Kai See (陳葵士)	BN (MCA)
6th	N15	1982-1986	Ahmad Razali Mohamad Ali	BN (UMNO)
Constituency abolished, split into Keramat and Pandan
Constituency re-created from Keramat
9th	N19	1995-1999	Mufti Suib	BN (UMNO)
10th	N19	1999-2004	Mufti Suib	BN (UMNO)
Constituency abolished, renamed to Bukit Antarabangsa

== Election results ==
Selangor state election, 1999
Party	Candidate	Votes	%	∆%
BN	Mufti Suib	10,776	52.76	▼19.48
DAP	Yap Kok Heng	9,650	47.24	▲19.48
Total valid votes		20,426	100.00	
Total rejected ballots		448		
Unreturned ballots		61		
Turnout		20,935	74.74	▲5.40
Registered electors		28,012		
Majority		1,126	5.51	▼38.95
BN hold		Swing		

Selangor state election, 1995
Party	Candidate	Votes	%	∆%
BN	Mufti Suib	12,695	72.23	▲2.70
DAP	Wong Kok Yew	4,880	27.77	▲27.77
Total valid votes		17,575	100.00	
Total rejected ballots		453		
Unreturned ballots		144		
Turnout		18,172	69.34	▼4.86
Registered electors		26,208		
Majority		7,815	44.47	▲5.41
BN hold		Swing		

Selangor state election, 1982
Party	Candidate	Votes	%	∆%
BN	Ahmad Razali Mohamad Ali	29,348	87.08	▲87.08
PAS	Abdul Karim Jamal	4,356	12.92	▼5.50
Total valid votes		33,704	100.00	
Total rejected ballots		1,148		
Unreturned ballots		0		
Turnout		34,852	69.39	▼4.99
Registered electors		50,229		
Majority		24,992	74.15	▲49.22
BN hold		Swing		

Selangor state election, 1978
Party	Candidate	Votes	%	∆%
BN	Tan Kui Sui @ Tan Kai See	12,749	52.82	▼5.73
DAP	Zainal Rampak	6,733	27.90	▼0.42
PAS	Ibrahim Ja'afar	4,447	18.43	▲18.43
Independent	Leow Kim Hock	206	0.85	▲0.85
Total valid votes		24,135	100.00	
Total rejected ballots		789		
Unreturned ballots		0		
Turnout		24,924	74.38	▲0.86
Registered electors		33,509		
Majority		6,016	24.93	▼5.31
BN hold		Swing		

Selangor state election, 1974
Party	Candidate	Votes	%	∆%
BN	Lim Heng Kiap	5,358	58.55	▲58.55
DAP	Au Keng Wah	2,591	28.31	▼14.59
PEKEMAS	Zainal Rampak	1,202	13.14	▲13.14
Total valid votes		9,151	100.00	
Total rejected ballots		343		
Unreturned ballots		0		
Turnout		9,494	73.52	▲14.23
Registered electors		12,913		
Majority		2,767	30.24	▲24.43
BN gain from DAP		Swing		?

Selangor state election, 1969
Party	Candidate	Votes	%	∆%
DAP	Wong Swee Oy	7,634	42.9	▲42.90
Alliance	Muhyeeddin Mohamed Zakaria	6,601	37.09	▼25.40
PMIP	Yunus Yatim	3,560	20.01	▲20.01
Total valid votes		17,795	100.00	
Total rejected ballots		1,118		
Unreturned ballots		0		
Turnout		18,913	59.29	▼10.38
Registered electors		31,899		
Majority		1,033	5.81	▼19.19
DAP gain from Alliance		Swing		?

Selangor state election, 1964
Party	Candidate	Votes	%	∆%
Alliance	Muhyeeddin Mohamed Zakaria	7,865	62.50	▲13.22
Socialist Front	Zakaria Mohamed Yusof	4,720	37.50	▲1.92
Total valid votes		12,585	100.00	
Total rejected ballots		777		
Unreturned ballots		0		
Turnout		13,362	69.67	▲8.42
Registered electors		19,178		
Majority		3,145	24.99	▲11.31
Alliance hold		Swing		?

Selangor state election, 1959
Party	Candidate	Votes	%
Alliance	Muhyeeddin Mohamed Zakaria	3,579	49.27
Socialist Front	Yusoff Betuah	2,585	35.59
PMIP	Mamat @ Abdul Samad Mohamed Salleh	853	11.74
National Party	Aziz Abdullah	247	3.40
Total valid votes		7,264	100.00
Total rejected ballots		86	
Unreturned ballots		0	
Turnout		7,350	61.26
Registered electors		11,999	
Majority		994	13.68
This was a new constituency created.
