= Cheka (state constituency) =

Political subdivision in Malaysia

Cheka (N04)
Pahang constituency

State constituency
- Legislature: Pahang State Legislative Assembly
MLA
Tuan Ibrahim Tuan Man
PN
- Constituency created: 1984 (as Ceka)
- First contested: 1986
- Last contested: 2022

Demographics
- Electors (2022): 16,822

Cheka is a state constituency in Pahang, Malaysia, that has been represented in the Pahang State Legislative Assembly.

== Demographics ==
Ethnic breakdown of Cheka's electorate as of 2022
1. Malay (72.4%)
2. Chinese (20.4%)
3. Indian (4.90%)
4. Other ethnicities (2.31%)

== History ==
=== Polling districts ===
According to the federal gazette issued on 31 October 2022, the Cheka constituency is divided into 11 polling districts.

State constituency	Polling district	Code	Location
Cheka（N04）	Kuala Lanar	079/04/01	SK Kuala Lanar
Cheka（N04）	Kuala Kenong	079/04/02	SK Batu 9
Cheka（N04）	Mela	079/04/03	SK Mela
Cheka（N04）	Kerambit	079/04/04	SK Kerambit
Cheka（N04）	Kampung Baru Penjom	079/04/05	SJK (C) Penjom
Cheka（N04）	Penjom	079/04/06	SK Penjom
Cheka（N04）	Cheneras	079/04/07	SK Clifford
Cheka（N04）	Sungai Kerpan	079/04/08	SJK (C) Chung Hwa
Cheka（N04）	Batu Kurap	079/04/09	Tadika Kekwa
Cheka（N04）	Bandar Lipis	079/04/10	SMK Clifford
Cheka（N04）	Bukit Bius	079/04/11	SK Wan Ibrahim

=== Representation history ===
Members of the Legislative Assembly for Cheka
Assembly	No	Years	Name	Party
Constituency created from Bandar Lipis, Tembeling and Tahan
Ceka
7th	N04	1986–1990	Abu Dahari Osman	BN (UMNO)
8th	N04	1990–1995	Abu Dahari Osman	BN (UMNO)
9th	N04	1995–1999	Fong Koong Fuee (房光辉)	BN (MCA)
10th	N04	1999–2004	Fong Koong Fuee (房光辉)	BN (MCA)
Cheka
11th	N04	2004–2008	Fong Koong Fuee (房光辉)	BN (MCA)
12th	N04	2008–2013	Fong Koong Fuee (房光辉)	BN (MCA)
13th	N04	2013–2018	Fong Koong Fuee (房光辉)	BN (MCA)
14th	N04	2018–2022	Lee Ah Wong (李亚旺)	BN (MCA)
15th	N04	2022–present	Tuan Ibrahim Tuan Man	PN (PAS)

== Election results ==
Pahang state election, 2022
Party	Candidate	Votes	%	∆%
PN	Tuan Ibrahim Tuan Man	5,634	45.51	▲45.51
BN	Ho Fong Mee	4,411	35.63	▼0.28
PH	Rasid Muhamad	2,255	18.21	▲18.21
PEJUANG	Aishaton Abu Bakar	81	0.65	▲0.65
Total valid votes		12,381	100.00	
Total rejected ballots		143		
Unreturned ballots		41		
Turnout		12,565	74.69	▼4.32
Registered electors		16,822		
Majority		1,223	9.88	▲7.79
PN gain from BN		Swing		?

Pahang state election, 2018
Party	Candidate	Votes	%	∆%
BN	Lee Ah Wong	3,475	35.91	▼20.36
PAS	Saludin Endol	3,273	33.82	▲33.82
PKR	Rasid Muhamad	2,930	30.27	▼13.46
Total valid votes		9,678	100.00	
Total rejected ballots		232		
Unreturned ballots		33		
Turnout		9,943	79.01	▼2.62
Registered electors		12,585		
Majority		202	2.09	▼10.44
BN hold		Swing		
Source(s) "Pahang - 14th General Election Malaysia (GE14 / PRU14)". The Star.

Pahang state election, 2013
Party	Candidate	Votes	%	∆%
BN	Fong Koong Fuee	5,324	56.26	▼2.27
PKR	Abas Awang	4,139	43.74	▲2.27
Total valid votes		9,463	100.00	
Total rejected ballots		211		
Unreturned ballots		56		
Turnout		9,730	81.63	▲7.54
Registered electors		11,920		
Majority		1,185	12.52	▼4.54
BN hold		Swing		

Pahang state election, 2008
Party	Candidate	Votes	%	∆%
BN	Fong Koong Fuee	4,391	58.53	▼6.13
PKR	Ishak Sat	3,111	41.47	▲41.47
Total valid votes		7,502	100.00	
Total rejected ballots		260		
Unreturned ballots		50		
Turnout		7,812	74.09	▲3.71
Registered electors		10,544		
Majority		1,280	17.06	▼12.25
BN hold		Swing		

Pahang state election, 2004
Party	Candidate	Votes	%	∆%
BN	Fong Koong Fuee	4,696	64.66	▲12.39
PAS	Abdul Wahab Sudin	2,567	35.34	▲35.34
Total valid votes		7,263	100.00	
Total rejected ballots		197		
Unreturned ballots		0		
Turnout		7,460	70.38	▲2.26
Registered electors		10,600		
Majority		2,129	29.31	▲24.79
BN hold		Swing		

Pahang state election, 1999: Ceka
Party	Candidate	Votes	%	∆%
BN	Fong Koong Fuee	3,708	52.26	▼8.38
PKR	Yusof Jaafar	3,387	47.74	▲47.74
Total valid votes		7,095	100.00	
Total rejected ballots		272		
Unreturned ballots		89		
Turnout		7,456	68.12	▼1.27
Registered electors		10,946		
Majority		321	4.52	▼16.76
BN hold		Swing		

Pahang state election, 1995: Ceka
Party	Candidate	Votes	%	∆%
BN	Fong Koong Fuee	4,243	60.64	▲60.64
S46	Ahmad Pilus	2,754	39.36	▲12.48
Total valid votes		6,997	100.00	
Total rejected ballots		809		
Unreturned ballots		148		
Turnout		7,954	69.38	▼2.27
Registered electors		11,464		
Majority		1,489	21.28	▼24.96
BN hold		Swing		

Pahang state election, 1990: Ceka
Party	Candidate	Votes	%	∆%
BN	Abu Dahari Osman	5,002	73.12	▲1.84
S46	Ahmad Pilus	1,839	26.88	▲26.88
Total valid votes		6,841	100.00	
Total rejected ballots		240		
Unreturned ballots		0		
Turnout		7,081	71.66	▲6.58
Registered electors		9,882		
Majority		3,163	46.24	▲3.68
BN hold		Swing		

Pahang state election, 1986: Ceka
Party	Candidate	Votes	%
BN	Abu Dahari Osman	3,653	71.28
PAS	Mohd Mokhtar Mansor	1,472	28.72
Total valid votes		5,125	100.00
Total rejected ballots		281	
Unreturned ballots		0	
Turnout		5,406	65.08
Registered electors		8,307	
Majority		2,181	42.56
This was a new constituency created.
