= Tangga Batu (state constituency) =

Malacca constituency

Defunct state constituency
- Legislature: Malacca State Legislative Assembly
- Constituency created: 1994
- Constituency abolished: 2004
- First contested: 1995
- Last contested: 1999

Tangga Batu was a state constituency in Malacca, Malaysia, that was represented in the Malacca State Legislative Assembly from 1995 to 2004.

The state constituency was created in the 1994 redistribution and was mandated to return a single member to the Malacca State Legislative Assembly under the first past the post voting system.

== History ==
It was abolished in 2004 when it was redistributed.

=== Representation history ===
Members of the Legislative Assembly for Tangga Batu
Assembly	No	Years	Member	Party
Constituency split from Sungai Udang and Tanjong Minyak
9th	N11	1995–1999	Hazizah Mohd Sultan	BN (UMNO)
10th	N11	1999–2004	Yaakub Md. Amin	BN (UMNO)
Constituency split into Pantai Kundor, Kelebang and Paya Rumput

== Election results ==
Malacca state election, 1999
Party	Candidate	Votes	%	∆%
BN	Yaakub Md. Amin	8,101	60.08	▼14.04
PKR	Hamzah Awang	5,382	39.92	▲39.92
Total valid votes		13,483	100.00	
Total rejected ballots		305		
Unreturned ballots		13		
Turnout		13,801	77.33	▲0.58
Registered electors		17,847		
Majority		2,719	20.17	▼33.49
BN hold		Swing		

Malacca state election, 1995
Party	Candidate	Votes	%
BN	Hazizah Mohd Sultan	9,228	74.13
PAS	Jaliluddin Abd. Wahid	2,548	20.47
S46	Abass Mohamed Noor	673	5.41
Total valid votes		12,449	100.00
Total rejected ballots		279	
Unreturned ballots		26	
Turnout		12,754	76.75
Registered electors		16,618	
Majority		6,680	53.66
This was a new constituency created.
