= Trong (state constituency) =

Political subdivision in Malaysia

Trong (N15)
Perak constituency

State constituency
- Legislature: Perak State Legislative Assembly
MLA
Faisal Abdul Rahman
PN
- Constituency created: 1995
- First contested: 1995
- Last contested: 2022

Demographics
- Electors (2022): 17,028

Trong is a state constituency in Perak, Malaysia, that has been represented in the Perak State Legislative Assembly.

== Demographics ==
Ethnic breakdown of Trong's electorate as of 2022
1. Malay (77.3%)
2. Chinese (13.3%)
3. Indian (8.92%)
4. Other ethnicities (0.49%)

== History ==
=== Polling districts ===
According to the federal gazette issued on 31 October 2022, the Trong constituency is divided into 14 polling districts.

| State constituency | Polling Districts | Code | Location |
|---|---|---|---|
| Trong（N15） | Kuala Trong | 059/15/01 | SJK (C) Siu Sin |
| Trong（N15） | Trong Barat | 059/15/02 | SK Toh Johan |
| Trong（N15） | Kampong Telok Trong | 059/15/03 | SK Temelok |
| Trong（N15） | Temelok | 059/15/04 | SK Temelok |
| Trong（N15） | Pasir Hitam Trong | 059/15/05 | SJK (C) Aik Hua |
| Trong（N15） | Sungai Tinggi | 059/15/06 | SK Sungai Tinggi |
| Trong（N15） | Sungai Che Rahmat | 059/15/07 | SK Permatang Raja |
| Trong（N15） | Permatang Raja | 059/15/08 | SK Permatang Raja |
| Trong（N15） | Batu Hampar | 059/15/09 | SK Batu Hampar |
| Trong（N15） | Sungai Rotan | 059/15/10 | SJK (C) Sungai Rotan |
| Trong（N15） | Padang Gajah | 059/15/11 | SK Padang Gajah |
| Trong（N15） | Ayer Terjun | 059/15/12 | SJK (C) Ngai Seng |
| Trong（N15） | Trong | 059/15/13 | SK Toh Johan |
| Trong（N15） | Bukit Gantang Selatan | 059/15/14 | SK Toh Johan |

=== Representation history ===
Members of the Legislative Assembly for Trong
| Assembly | No | Years | Name | Party |
Constituency created from Batu Hampar and Changkat Jering
| 9th | N12 | 1995–1999 | Saharudin Abdul Jabar | BN (UMNO) |
| 10th | N12 | 1999–2004 | Saharudin Abdul Jabar | BN (UMNO) |
| 11th | N15 | 2004–2008 | Rosli Husin | BN (UMNO) |
| 12th | N15 | 2008–2013 | Rosli Husin | BN (UMNO) |
| 13th | N15 | 2013–2018 | Zabri Abdul Wahid | BN (UMNO) |
| 14th | N15 | 2018–2022 | Jamilah Zakaria | BN (UMNO) |
| 15th | N15 | 2022–present | Faisal Abdul Rahman | PN (PAS) |

== Election results ==
Perak state election, 2022
| Party | Candidate | Votes | % | ∆% |
|---|---|---|---|---|
| PN | Faisal Abdul Rahman | 5,671 | 43.77 | ▲43.77 |
| BN | Jamilah Zakaria | 5,055 | 39.01 | ▼8.02 |
| PH | Junaida Jamaluddin | 2,119 | 16.35 | ▲16.35 |
| GTA | Mustaffa Kamal | 112 | 0.86 | ▲0.86 |
| Total valid votes | | 13,161 | 100.00 | |
| Total rejected ballots | | 191 | | |
| Unreturned ballots | | 13 | | |
| Turnout | | 13,365 | 77.29 | ▼4.08 |
| Registered electors | | 17,028 | | |
| Majority | | 616 | 4.76 | ▼12.61 |
| PN gain from BN | | Swing | | ? |

Perak state election, 2018
| Party | Candidate | Votes | % | ∆% |
|---|---|---|---|---|
| BN | Jamilah Zakaria | 5,139 | 47.03 | ▼11.24 |
| PAS | Faisal Abdul Rahman | 3,241 | 29.66 | ▼12.07 |
| PKR | Shaharuddin Abdul Rashid | 2,546 | 23.30 | ▲22.30 |
| Total valid votes | | 10,926 | 97.79 | |
| Total rejected ballots | | 209 | 1.87 | |
| Unreturned ballots | | 38 | 0.34 | |
| Turnout | | 11,173 | 81.37 | ▼3.63 |
| Registered electors | | 13,731 | | |
| Majority | | 1,898 | 17.37 | ▲0.33 |
| BN hold | | Swing | | |
Source(s) "RESULTS OF CONTESTED ELECTION AND STATEMENTS OF THE POLL AFTER THE OFFICIAL ADDITION OF VOTES".

Perak state election, 2013
| Party | Candidate | Votes | % | ∆% |
|---|---|---|---|---|
| BN | Zabri Abdul Wahid | 6,353 | 58.27 | ▲2.17 |
| PAS | Norazli Musa | 4,549 | 41.73 | ▼2.17 |
| Total valid votes | | 10,902 | 98.38 | |
| Total rejected ballots | | 163 | 1.47 | |
| Unreturned ballots | | 16 | 0.14 | |
| Turnout | | 11,081 | 85.00 | ▲14.50 |
| Registered electors | | 13,043 | | |
| Majority | | 1,804 | 17.04 | ▲4.84 |
| BN hold | | Swing | | |
Source(s) "KEPUTUSAN PILIHAN RAYA UMUM DEWAN UNDANGAN NEGERI".

Perak state election, 2008
| Party | Candidate | Votes | % | ∆% |
|---|---|---|---|---|
| BN | Rosli Husin | 4,212 | 56.10 | ▼13.62 |
| PAS | Norazli Musa | 3,296 | 43.90 | ▲13.62 |
| Total valid votes | | 7,508 | 97.63 | |
| Total rejected ballots | | 173 | 2.25 | |
| Unreturned ballots | | 9 | 0.12 | |
| Turnout | | 7,690 | 70.50 | ▲1.70 |
| Registered electors | | 10,908 | | |
| Majority | | 916 | 12.20 | ▼27.24 |
| BN hold | | Swing | | |
Source(s) "KEPUTUSAN PILIHAN RAYA UMUM DEWAN UNDANGAN NEGERI PERAK BAGI TAHUN 2008".

Perak state election, 2004
| Party | Candidate | Votes | % | ∆% |
|---|---|---|---|---|
| BN | Rosli Husin | 5,338 | 69.72 | ▼16.11 |
| PAS | Mohd Idris Zakaria | 2,318 | 30.28 | ▲16.11 |
| Total valid votes | | 7,656 | 97.74 | |
| Total rejected ballots | | 152 | 1.94 | |
| Unreturned ballots | | 25 | 0.32 | |
| Turnout | | 7,833 | 68.80 | ▲4.19 |
| Registered electors | | 11,386 | | |
| Majority | | 3,020 | 39.44 | ▲32.22 |
| BN hold | | Swing | | |
Source(s) "KEPUTUSAN PILIHAN RAYA UMUM DEWAN UNDANGAN NEGERI PERAK BAGI TAHUN 2004".

Perak state election, 1999
| Party | Candidate | Votes | % | ∆% |
|---|---|---|---|---|
| BN | Saharudin Abdul Jabar | 5,488 | 53.61 | ▼15.27 |
| PAS | Ghazali Abdullah | 4,749 | 46.39 | ▲15.27 |
| Total valid votes | | 10,237 | 97.12 | |
| Total rejected ballots | | 278 | 2.64 | |
| Unreturned ballots | | 26 | 0.25 | |
| Turnout | | 10,541 | 64.61 | ▼0.50 |
| Registered electors | | 16,315 | | |
| Majority | | 739 | 7.22 | ▼30.54 |
| BN hold | | Swing | | |
Source(s) "KEPUTUSAN PILIHAN RAYA UMUM DEWAN UNDANGAN NEGERI PERAK BAGI TAHUN 1999".

Perak state election, 1995
| Party | Candidate | Votes | % |
|---|---|---|---|
| BN | Saharudin Abdul Jabar | 6,471 | 68.8 |
| PAS | Sidek Mohd Noor | 2,923 | 31.12 |
| Total valid votes | | 9,394 | 96.69 |
| Total rejected ballots | | 303 | 3.12 |
| Unreturned ballots | | 19 | 0.20 |
| Turnout | | 9,716 | 65.11 |
| Registered electors | | 14,923 | |
| Majority | | 3,548 | 37.76 |
This was a new constituency created.
Source(s) "KEPUTUSAN PILIHAN RAYA UMUM DEWAN UNDANGAN NEGERI PERAK BAGI TAHUN 1995".
