= Alai (state constituency) =

Malacca constituency

Defunct state constituency
- Legislature: Malacca State Legislative Assembly
- Constituency created: 1994
- Constituency abolished: 2004
- First contested: 1995
- Last contested: 1999

Alai was a state constituency in Malacca, Malaysia, that was represented in the Malacca State Legislative Assembly from 1995 to 2004.

The state constituency was created in the 1994 redistribution and was mandated to return a single member to the Malacca State Legislative Assembly under the first past the post voting system.

== History ==
It was abolished in 2004 when it was redistributed.

=== Representation history ===
Members of the Legislative Assembly for Alai
Assembly	No	Years	Member	Party
Constituency split from Bandar Hilir and Serkam
9th	N20	1995–1999	Nasir Manap	BN (UMNO)
10th	N20	1999–2004	Amid Nordin	BN (UMNO)
Constituency split into Ayer Molek and Telok Mas

== Election results ==
Malacca state election, 1999
Party	Candidate	Votes	%	∆%
BN	Amid Nordin	6,204	55.39	▼18.68
PAS	Abd Rahman Jaafar	4,996	44.61	▲25.12
Total valid votes		11,200	100.00	
Total rejected ballots		248		
Unreturned ballots		8		
Turnout		11,456	80.69	▲0.98
Registered electors		14,198		
Majority		1,208	10.79	▼43.79
BN hold		Swing		

Malacca state election, 1995
Party	Candidate	Votes	%
BN	Nasir Manap	7,532	74.07
PAS	Abdul Gani Ahmad	1,982	19.49
S46	Abdul Wahab Abdul Razak	655	6.44
Total valid votes		10,169	100.00
Total rejected ballots		280	
Unreturned ballots		23	
Turnout		10,472	79.71
Registered electors		13,138	
Majority		5,550	54.58
This was a new constituency created.
