= 1999 Malaysian state elections =

State assembly elections were held in Malaysia on 29 November 1999 in all states except Sabah and Sarawak. The elections were held alongside general elections, and saw the opposition win a total of 113 seats, 98 of which went to the Pan-Malaysian Islamic Party (PAS), 11 to the Democratic Action Party (DAP) and 4 for the People's Justice Party. In the states of Kelantan and Terengganu, the PAS won by a huge margin–41-2 against Barisan Nasional and 28-4 respectively–hence allowing them to form the state governments in these states. In addition, the PAS also captured one-third of the seats in Kedah, with the remaining two-thirds going to Barisan Nasional (United Malays National Organisation won 16 seats and the Malaysian Chinese Association 2).

The election results were seen as a great gain for PAS, who previously had no state seats in Kedah and capturing only one seat in Terengganu in the 1995 elections. Observers attributed this to the neglect by the Federal Administration in the states of Terengganu and Kelantan.

Sabah held its state assembly election earlier on 12 – 13 March 1999.

== Results ==
=== Perlis ===
| Party or alliance | | Votes | % | Seats | +/– |
|---|---|---|---|---|---|
| Barisan Nasional | United Malays National Organisation | 39,111 | 47.49 | 10 | –3 |
| Barisan Nasional | Malaysian Chinese Association | 6,717 | 8.16 | 2 | 0 |
| Barisan Nasional | Total | 45,828 | 55.65 | 12 | –3 |
| Barisan Alternatif | Pan-Malaysian Islamic Party | 32,686 | 39.69 | 3 | +3 |
| Barisan Alternatif | Parti Keadilan Nasional | 3,841 | 4.66 | 0 | New |
| Barisan Alternatif | Total | 36,527 | 44.35 | 3 | +3 |
| Total | | 82,355 | 100.00 | 15 | 0 |
| Valid votes | | 82,355 | 96.19 | | |
| Invalid/blank votes | | 3,264 | 3.81 | | |
| Total votes | | 85,619 | 100.00 | | |
| Registered voters/turnout | | 105,733 | 80.98 | | |

=== Kedah ===
| Party or alliance | | Seats | +/– |
|---|---|---|---|
| Barisan Nasional | United Malays National Organisation | 16 | –10 |
| Barisan Nasional | Malaysian Chinese Association | 4 | 0 |
| Barisan Nasional | Malaysian Indian Congress | 2 | 0 |
| Barisan Nasional | Parti Gerakan Rakyat Malaysia | 2 | 0 |
| Barisan Nasional | Total | 24 | –10 |
| Pan-Malaysian Islamic Party | | 12 | +10 |
| Total | | 36 | 0 |

=== Kelantan ===
| Party or alliance | | Seats | +/– |
|---|---|---|---|
| Pan-Malaysian Islamic Party | | 41 | +17 |
| Barisan Nasional | United Malays National Organisation | 2 | –4 |
| Barisan Nasional | Malaysian Chinese Association | 0 | –1 |
| Barisan Nasional | Total | 2 | –5 |
| National Justice Party | | 0 | New |
| Total | | 43 | 0 |

=== Terengganu ===
| Party or alliance | | Seats | +/– |
|---|---|---|---|
| Pan-Malaysian Islamic Party | | 28 | +21 |
| Barisan Nasional | United Malays National Organisation | 4 | –20 |
| Barisan Nasional | Malaysian Chinese Association | 0 | –1 |
| Barisan Nasional | Total | 4 | –21 |
| Total | | 32 | 0 |

=== Penang ===
| Party or alliance | | Seats | +/– |
|---|---|---|---|
| Barisan Nasional | United Malays National Organisation | 10 | –2 |
| Barisan Nasional | Parti Gerakan Rakyat Malaysia | 10 | 0 |
| Barisan Nasional | Malaysian Chinese Association | 9 | 0 |
| Barisan Nasional | Malaysian Indian Congress | 1 | 0 |
| Barisan Nasional | Total | 30 | –2 |
| Democratic Action Party | | 1 | 0 |
| Pan-Malaysian Islamic Party | | 1 | +1 |
| National Justice Party | | 1 | +1 |
| Total | | 33 | 0 |

=== Perak ===
| Party or alliance | | Seats | +/– |
|---|---|---|---|
| Barisan Nasional | United Malays National Organisation | 26 | –4 |
| Barisan Nasional | Malaysian Chinese Association | 12 | –2 |
| Barisan Nasional | Parti Gerakan Rakyat Malaysia | 3 | –1 |
| Barisan Nasional | Malaysian Indian Congress | 3 | 0 |
| Barisan Nasional | People's Progressive Party | 0 | 0 |
| Barisan Nasional | Total | 44 | –7 |
| Democratic Action Party | | 4 | +3 |
| Pan-Malaysian Islamic Party | | 3 | +3 |
| National Justice Party | | 1 | New |
| Total | | 52 | 0 |

=== Pahang ===
| Party or alliance | | Seats | +/– |
|---|---|---|---|
| Barisan Nasional | United Malays National Organisation | 21 | –7 |
| Barisan Nasional | Malaysian Chinese Association | 7 | 0 |
| Barisan Nasional | Parti Gerakan Rakyat Malaysia | 1 | 0 |
| Barisan Nasional | Malaysian Indian Congress | 1 | 0 |
| Barisan Nasional | Total | 30 | –7 |
| Pan-Malaysian Islamic Party | | 6 | +6 |
| Democratic Action Party | | 1 | 0 |
| National Justice Party | | 1 | New |
| Total | | 38 | 0 |

=== Selangor ===
| Party or alliance | | Seats | +/– |
|---|---|---|---|
| Barisan Nasional | United Malays National Organisation | 26 | –4 |
| Barisan Nasional | Malaysian Chinese Association | 11 | 0 |
| Barisan Nasional | Malaysian Indian Congress | 3 | 0 |
| Barisan Nasional | Parti Gerakan Rakyat Malaysia | 2 | +1 |
| Barisan Nasional | Total | 42 | –3 |
| Pan-Malaysian Islamic Party | | 4 | +4 |
| Democratic Action Party | | 1 | –2 |
| National Justice Party | | 1 | New |
| Independents | | 0 | 0 |
| Total | | 48 | 0 |

=== Negeri Sembilan ===
| Party or alliance | | Seats | +/– |
|---|---|---|---|
| Barisan Nasional | United Malays National Organisation | 20 | 0 |
| Barisan Nasional | Malaysian Chinese Association | 9 | +2 |
| Barisan Nasional | Malaysian Indian Congress | 2 | 0 |
| Barisan Nasional | Parti Gerakan Rakyat Malaysia | 1 | 0 |
| Barisan Nasional | Total | 32 | +2 |
| Democratic Action Party | | 0 | –2 |
| Pan-Malaysian Islamic Party | | 0 | 0 |
| Total | | 32 | 0 |

=== Malacca ===
| Party or alliance | | Seats | +/– |
|---|---|---|---|
| Barisan Nasional | United Malays National Organisation | 16 | 0 |
| Barisan Nasional | Malaysian Chinese Association | 4 | –1 |
| Barisan Nasional | Malaysian Indian Congress | 1 | 0 |
| Barisan Nasional | Total | 21 | –1 |
| Democratic Action Party | | 4 | +1 |
| Pan-Malaysian Islamic Party | | 0 | 0 |
| Total | | 25 | 0 |

=== Johor ===
| Party or alliance | | Seats | +/– |
|---|---|---|---|
| Barisan Nasional | United Malays National Organisation | 25 | 0 |
| Barisan Nasional | Malaysian Chinese Association | 11 | 0 |
| Barisan Nasional | Malaysian Indian Congress | 2 | 0 |
| Barisan Nasional | Parti Gerakan Rakyat Malaysia | 2 | 0 |
| Barisan Nasional | Total | 40 | 0 |
| Democratic Action Party | | 0 | 0 |
| Pan-Malaysian Islamic Party | | 0 | 0 |
| Total | | 40 | 0 |

=== Sabah ===
| Party or alliance | | Votes | % | Seats | +/– |
|---|---|---|---|---|---|
| Barisan Nasional | United Malays National Organisation | 129,908 | 25.12 | 24 | +5 |
| Barisan Nasional | Sabah Progressive Party | 29,337 | 5.67 | 3 | 0 |
| Barisan Nasional | Liberal Democratic Party | 11,654 | 2.25 | 2 | +1 |
| Barisan Nasional | Sabah Democratic Party | 47,494 | 9.19 | 2 | New |
| Barisan Nasional | Malaysian Chinese Association | 5,963 | 1.15 | 0 | New |
| Barisan Nasional | Parti Bersatu Rakyat Sabah | 7,526 | 1.46 | 0 | New |
| Barisan Nasional | Angkatan Keadilan Rakyat | 8,033 | 1.55 | 0 | -1 |
| Barisan Nasional | Total | 239,915 | 46.40 | 31 | +6 |
| United Sabah Party | | 213,432 | 41.28 | 17 | -8 |
| Federated Sabah People's Front | | 54,732 | 10.59 | 0 | 0 |
| United Democratic Sabah People's Power Party | | 4,193 | 0.81 | 0 | 0 |
| Pan-Malaysian Islamic Party | | 1,352 | 0.26 | 0 | 0 |
| United Pasok Nunukragang National Organisation | | 18 | 0.00 | 0 | 0 |
| Independents | | 3,422 | 0.66 | 0 | 0 |
| Total | | 517,064 | 100.00 | 48 | 0 |
| Valid votes | | 517,064 | 98.13 | | |
| Invalid/blank votes | | 9,868 | 1.87 | | |
| Total votes | | 526,932 | 100.00 | | |
| Registered voters/turnout | | 726,690 | 72.51 | | |
