= Hulu Selangor (federal constituency) =

Federal constituency of Selangor, Malaysia

Hulu Selangor (P094)
Selangor constituency

Federal constituency
- Legislature: Dewan Rakyat
- MP: Mohd Hasnizan Harun; PN
- Constituency created: 1955
- First contested: 1955
- Last contested: 2022

Demographics
- Population (2020): 239,978
- Electors (2023): 156,664
- Area (km²): 1,712
- Pop. density (per km²): 140.2

Hulu Selangor (formerly Ulu Selangor) is a federal constituency in Hulu Selangor District, Selangor, Malaysia, that has been represented in the Dewan Rakyat since 1955.

The federal constituency is mandated to return a single member to the Dewan Rakyat under the first past the post voting system.

== Demographics ==
Ethnic breakdown of Hulu Selangor's electorate as of 2023
1. Malay (63.4%)
2. Chinese (17.8%)
3. Indian (14.9%)
4. Other ethnicities (3.97%)

Ref:

Age breakdown of Hulu Selangor's electorate as of 2023
1. 18-20 (8.03%)
2. 21-29 (25.5%)
3. 30-39 (20.8%)
4. 40-49 (15.8%)
5. 50-59 (15.0%)
6. 60-69 (9.41%)
7. 70-79 (3.89%)
8. 80-89 (1.29%)
9. above 90 (0.27%)
Gender breakdown of Hulu Selangor's electorate as of 2023
1. Male (49.6%)
2. Female (50.4%)

== History ==
=== Polling districts ===
According to the federal gazette issued on 18 July 2023, the Hulu Selangor constituency is divided into 50 polling districts.

State constituency	Polling Districts	Code	Location
Hulu Bernam (N05)	Kawasan S.K.C	094/05/01	SK Sri Keledang
Hulu Bernam (N05)	Ladang Lima Belas	094/05/02	SJK (T) Ladang Lima Belas Hulu Selangor
Hulu Bernam (N05)	Gedangsa	094/05/03	SMK Gedangsa
Hulu Bernam (N05)	Sungai Selisik	094/05/04	SK Sungai Selisek
Hulu Bernam (N05)	Kampung Gesir	094/05/05	SK Gesir Tengah
Hulu Bernam (N05)	Kampung Sungai Dusun	094/05/06	SK Kampung Soeharto
Hulu Bernam (N05)	Kampung Desa Maju	094/05/07	SK Sungai Tengi
Hulu Bernam (N05)	Kampung Sungai Tengi Selatan	094/05/08	SK Seri Fajar FELDA Sungai Tengi Selatan
Hulu Bernam (N05)	Changkat Asa	094/05/09	SJK (T) Ladang Changkat Asa
Hulu Bernam (N05)	Kampung Hulu Bernam	094/05/10	SRA Hulu Bernam; SJK (T) Ladang Kalumpang
Hulu Bernam (N05)	Ladang Escot	094/05/11	SK Hulu Bernam
Hulu Bernam (N05)	Kampung Gumut	094/05/12	SRA Kalumpang
Hulu Bernam (N05)	Bandar Kalumpang	094/06/13	SMK Kalumpang
Hulu Bernam (N05)	Kampung Baharu Kalumpang	094/05/14	SJK (C) Kalumpang
Hulu Bernam (N05)	Kuala Kalumpang	094/05/15	SK Kalumpang
Kuala Kubu Baharu (N06)	Kampung Baharu Kerling	094/06/01	SJK (C) Kerling
Kuala Kubu Baharu (N06)	Pertak	094/06/02	SJK (C) Bukit Fraser; Pusat Pembangunan Pendidikan & Nutrisi Kanak-Kanak Pertak; Tadika KEMAS Kg. Gerachi Jaya
Kuala Kubu Baharu (N06)	Ampang Pechah	094/06/03	SMK Ampang Pechah (Bestari)
Kuala Kubu Baharu (N06)	Kampung Baharu China K.K.B	094/06/04	SJK (C) Khing Ming Kuala Kubu Bharu
Kuala Kubu Baharu (N06)	Bandar Kuala Kubu Baharu	094/06/05	SMK Dato' Haji Kamaruddin Kuala Kubu Bharu
Kuala Kubu Baharu (N06)	Kampung Air Jernih	094/06/06	SMK Kuala Kubu Bharu (Sm3kb) Jalan Kolam Air
Kuala Kubu Baharu (N06)	Kerling	094/06/07	SK Kerling
Kuala Kubu Baharu (N06)	Lembah Beringin	094/06/08	SJK (T) Ladang Kerling
Kuala Kubu Baharu (N06)	Ladang Nigel Gardner	094/06/09	SJK (T) Nigel Gardner Bestari Jaya
Kuala Kubu Baharu (N06)	Jalan Kuala Keli	094/06/10	SJK (C) Rasa
Kuala Kubu Baharu (N06)	Kampung Baharu Rasa	094/06/11	SJK (C) Rasa
Kuala Kubu Baharu (N06)	Pekan Rasa	094/06/12	Dewan Orang ramai Jalan Anggerik
Kuala Kubu Baharu (N06)	Kampung Baharu Batang Kali	094/06/13	SJK (C) Batang Kali
Kuala Kubu Baharu (N06)	Hulu Yam Lama	094/06/14	SJK (C) Choong Chee Hulu Yam Lama
Kuala Kubu Baharu (N06)	Bandar Utama Batang Kali	094/06/15	SK Bandar Baru Batang Kali; SRA Bandar Utama Batang Kali
Kuala Kubu Baharu (N06)	Batu 30 Hulu Yam	094/06/16	SK Hulu Yam Lama
Batang Kali (N07)	Bukit Rasa	094/07/01	SK Rasa
Batang Kali (N07)	Batang Kali	094/07/02	SK Batang Kali
Batang Kali (N07)	Hulu Kali	094/07/03	SMK Bandar Baru Batang Kali
Batang Kali (N07)	Kampung Padang	094/07/04	SRA Hulu Yam Baharu
Batang Kali (N07)	Hulu Yam Baru 1	094/07/05	SK Ulu Yam Bharu
Batang Kali (N07)	Hulu Yam Baru 2	094/07/06	SJK (C) Kampung Gurney Hulu Yam Baharu
Batang Kali (N07)	Serendah	094/07/07	SRA Serendah
Batang Kali (N07)	Sungai Choh	094/07/08	SK Sungai Choh
Batang Kali (N07)	Sungai Gapi	094/07/09	SK Antara Gapi
Batang Kali (N07)	Taman Bukit Teratai	094/07/10	SJK (T) Sungai Choh Taman Bukit Teratai
Batang Kali (N07)	Sungai Buaya	094/07/11	SK Sungai Buaya
Batang Kali (N07)	Bukit Beruntung	094/07/12	SK Bukit Beruntung; SK Bukit Beruntung 2
Batang Kali (N07)	Bandar Sungai Buaya	094/07/13	SMK Bandar Sungai Buaya
Batang Kali (N07)	Bukit Sentosa 1 Hingga 5	094/07/14	SMK Bukit Sentosa
Batang Kali (N07)	Bukit Sentosa 6 Hingga 12	094/07/15	SK Bukit Sentosa; SMK Bukit Sentosa (2)
Batang Kali (N07)	Taman Bunga Raya	094/07/16	SRA Taman Bunga Raya; SMK Taman Bunga Raya (1)
Batang Kali (N07)	Kampung Baharu Serendah	094/07/17	SJK (C) Serendah
Batang Kali (N07)	Taman Bunga Raya 2	094/07/18	SK Taman Bunga Raya (1)
Batang Kali (N07)	Seri Serendah	094/07/19	SK Serendah

=== Representation history ===
Members of Parliament for Hulu Selangor
Parliament	No	Years	Member	Party	Vote Share
Constituency created
Ulu Selangor
Federal Legislative Council
1st		1955–1959	Che Halimahton Abdul Majid (چئ حليمةٌ عبدالمجيد)	Alliance (UMNO)	5,430; 82.40%
Parliament of the Federation of Malaya
1st	P078	1959–1963	Omar Ong Yoke Lin (翁毓麟)	Alliance (MCA)	6,537; 56.07%
Parliament of Malaysia
1st	P078	1963–1964	Omar Ong Yoke Lin (翁毓麟)	Alliance (MCA)	6,537; 56.07%
2nd	P078	1964–1969	Khaw Kai Boh (许启谟)	Alliance (MCA)	9,412; 69.15%
		1969–1971	Parliament was suspended		
3rd	P078	1971–1972	Khaw Kai Boh (许启谟)	Alliance (MCA)	8,278; 55.07%
3rd	P078	1972–1973	Michael Chen Wing Sum (曾永森)	Alliance (MCA)	11,052; 67.02%
3rd	P078	1973–1974	Michael Chen Wing Sum (曾永森)	BN (MCA)	11,052; 67.02%
4th	P075	1974–1978	Michael Chen Wing Sum (曾永森)	BN (MCA)	15,323; 75.14%
5th	P075	1978–1981	Michael Chen Wing Sum (曾永森)	BN (MCA)	17,670; 70.27%
5th	P075	1981–1982	Michael Chen Wing Sum (曾永森)	BN (GERAKAN)	17,670; 70.27%
6th	P075	1982–1986	Lee Kim Sai (李金狮)	BN (MCA)	14,138; 48.70%
Hulu Selangor
7th	P084	1986–1990	Subramaniam Sinniah (சி. சுப்ரமணியம்)	BN (MIC)	19,201; 67.41%
8th	P084	1990–1995	Palanivel Govindasamy (பழனிவேல் கோவிந்தசாமி)	BN (MIC)	20,839; 63.74%
9th	P088	1995–1999	Palanivel Govindasamy (பழனிவேல் கோவிந்தசாமி)	BN (MIC)	26,829; 80.15%
10th	P088	1999–2004	Palanivel Govindasamy (பழனிவேல் கோவிந்தசாமி)	BN (MIC)	22,143; 62.04%
11th	P094	2004–2008	Palanivel Govindasamy (பழனிவேல் கோவிந்தசாமி)	BN (MIC)	27,807; 67.61%
12th	P094	2008–2010	Zainal Abidin Ahmad (زين العابدين أحمد)	PR (PKR)	23,177; 50.21%
12th	P094	2010–2013	P. Kamalanathan (பி.கமலநாதன்)	BN (MIC)	24,997; 51.79%
13th	P094	2013–2018	P. Kamalanathan (பி.கமலநாதன்)	BN (MIC)	37,403; 50.89%
14th	P094	2018–2022	June Leow Hsiad Hui (廖书慧)	PH (PKR)	40,783; 47.86%
15th	P094	2022–present	Mohd Hasnizan Harun (محمّد حسن ظن هارون)	PN (PAS)	46,823; 38.24%

=== State constituency ===
Parliamentary constituency	State constituency						
Parliamentary constituency	1955–59*	1959–1974	1974–1986	1986–1995	1995–2004	2004–2018	2018–present
Hulu Selangor				Batang Kali			
Hulu Selangor					Hulu Bernam		
Hulu Selangor				Kalumpang			
Hulu Selangor				Kuala Kubu Baharu			
Ulu Selangor			Batang Kali				
Ulu Selangor			Kalumpang				
Ulu Selangor		Kuala Kubu					
Ulu Selangor			Kuala Kubu Bharu				
Ulu Selangor	Sabak Bernam						
Ulu Selangor	Selangor Ulu						
Ulu Selangor		Ulu Bernam					

=== Historical boundaries ===
State Constituency	Area					
State Constituency	1959	1974	1984	1994	2003	2018
Batang Kali		Batang Kali; Bukit Beruntung; Hulu Yam Lama; Serendah; Sungai Buaya		Ampang Pechah; Batang Kali; Bukit Beruntung; Hulu Yam Lama; Serendah	Batang Kali; Bukit Beruntung; Hulu Yam Lama; Serendah; Sungai Buaya	
Hulu Bernam	Hulu Bernam; Kalumpang; Kampung Selisek; Kerling; Sungai Tinggi			FELDA Gedangsa; FELDA Sungai Tengi; Hulu Bernam; Kalumpang; Kampung Selisek		
Kalumpang		FELDA Gedangsa; FELDA Sungai Tengi; Hulu Bernam; Kalumpang; Kampung Selisek				
Kuala Kubu	Ampang Pecah; Antara Gapi; Batang Kali; Hulu Yam; Rasa					
Kuala Kubu Baharu		Ampang Pecah; Kerling; Kuala Kubu Baharu; Rasa; Ladang Sungai Tinggi	Ampang Pecah; Kerling; Kuala Kubu Baharu; Pertak; Rasa	Bandar Batang Kali; Hulu Yam Lama; Kuala Kubu Baharu; Lembah Beringin; Pertak	Ampang Pecah; Bandar Batang Kali; Hulu Yam Lama; Kuala Kubu Baharu; Lembah Beringin	

=== Current state assembly members ===
No.	State Constituency	Member	Coalition (Party)
N05	Hulu Bernam	Mui'zzuddeen Mahyuddin	PN (PAS)
N06	Kuala Kubu Baharu	Pang Sock Tao	PH (DAP)
N07	Batang Kali	Muhammad Muhaimin Harith Abdullah Sani	PN (BERSATU)

=== Local governments & postcodes ===
No.	State Constituency	Local Government	Postcode
N05	Hulu Bernam	Hulu Selangor Municipal Council	44000, 44010, 44020, 44110 Kuala Kubu Baharu; 44100 Kerling; 44200 Rasa; 44300 Batang Kali; 48000, 48010, 48200, 48300 Rawang
N06	Kuala Kubu Baharu	Hulu Selangor Municipal Council	44000, 44010, 44020, 44110 Kuala Kubu Baharu; 44100 Kerling; 44200 Rasa; 44300 Batang Kali; 48000, 48010, 48200, 48300 Rawang
N07	Batang Kali	Hulu Selangor Municipal Council	44000, 44010, 44020, 44110 Kuala Kubu Baharu; 44100 Kerling; 44200 Rasa; 44300 Batang Kali; 48000, 48010, 48200, 48300 Rawang

== Election results ==
Malaysian general election, 2022
Party	Candidate	Votes	%	∆%
PN	Mohd Hasnizan Harun	46,823	38.24	▲38.24
PH	Sathia Prakash Nadarajan	45,261	36.97	▲36.97
BN	Mohan Thangarasu	27,050	22.09	▼10.05
PEJUANG	Harumaini Omar	1,849	1.51	▲1.51
PBM	Haniza Mohamed Talha	1,013	0.83	▲0.83
Independent	Azlinda Baroni	446	0.36	▲0.36
Total valid votes		122,442	100.00	
Total rejected ballots		1,424		
Unreturned ballots		218		
Turnout		124,804	79.34	▼6.61
Registered electors		154,317		
Majority		1,562	1.27	▼14.44
PN gain from PKR		Swing		?
Source(s) https://lom.agc.gov.my/ilims/upload/portal/akta/outputp/1753283/PUB612.pdf

Malaysian general election, 2018
Party	Candidate	Votes	%	∆%
PKR	June Leow Hsiad Hui	40,783	47.86	▲1.61
BN	P. Kamalanathan	27,392	32.14	▼18.75
PAS	Wan Mat Sulaiman	16,620	19.50	▲19.50
Independent	Kumar Paramasivam	426	0.50	▼0.50
Total valid votes		85,221	100.00	
Total rejected ballots		1,310		
Unreturned ballots		267		
Turnout		86,798	85.95	▼1.70
Registered electors		100,990		
Majority		13,391	15.71	▲11.07
PKR gain from BN		Swing		?
Source(s) "His Majesty's Government Gazette - Notice of Contested Election, Parliament for the State of Selangor [P.U. (B) 239/2018]" (PDF). Attorney General's Chambers of Malaysia. 3 May 2018. Archived from the original (PDF) on 2019-07-19. "Federal Government Gazette - Results of Contested Election and Statements of the Poll after the Official Addition of Votes, Parliamentary Constituencies for the State of Selangor [P.U. (B) 313/2018]" (PDF). Attorney General's Chambers of Malaysia. 28 May 2018. Archived from the original (PDF) on 2019-07-19.

Malaysian general election, 2013
Party	Candidate	Votes	%	∆%
BN	P. Kamalanathan	37,403	50.89	▼0.90
PKR	Khalid Jaafar	33,989	46.25	▼1.96
Independent	Radzali Mokhtar	1,105	1.50	▲1.50
Independent	Santhara Kumar	999	1.36	▲1.36
Total valid votes		73,496	100.00	
Total rejected ballots		1,451		
Unreturned ballots		166		
Turnout		75,113	87.65	▲11.58
Registered electors		85,697		
Majority		3,414	4.64	▲1.06
BN hold		Swing		
Source(s) "Federal Government Gazette - Notice of Contested Election, Parliament for the State of Selangor [P.U. (B) 176/2013]" (PDF). Attorney General's Chambers of Malaysia. 26 April 2013. Archived from the original (PDF) on 2018-09-30. "Federal Government Gazette - Results of Contested Election and Statements of the Poll after the Official Addition of Votes, Parliamentary Constituencies for the State of Selangor [P.U. (B) 217/2013]" (PDF). Attorney General's Chambers of Malaysia. 22 May 2013. Archived from the original (PDF) on 2018-09-30.

Malaysian general by-election, 25 April 2010 Upon the death of incumbent, Zainal Abidin Ahmad
Party	Candidate	Votes	%	∆%
BN	P. Kamalanathan	24,997	51.79	▲2.00
PKR	Mohd Zaid Ibrahim	23,272	48.21	▼2.00
Total valid votes		48,269	100.00	
Total rejected ballots		731		
Unreturned ballots		67		
Turnout		49,067	76.07	▲0.83
Registered electors		64,500		
Majority		1,725	3.58	▲3.16
BN gain from PKR		Swing		?
Source(s) "Pilihan Raya Kecil P.094 Hulu Selangor". Election Commission of Malaysia. Archived from the original on 2018-09-19.

Malaysian general election, 2008
Party	Candidate	Votes	%	∆%
PKR	Zainal Abidin Ahmad	23,177	50.21	▲50.21
BN	G. Palanivel	22,979	49.79	▼17.82
Total valid votes		46,156	100.00	
Total rejected ballots		1,466		
Unreturned ballots		223		
Turnout		47,845	75.24	▲2.47
Registered electors		63,593		
Majority		198	0.42	▼34.80
PKR gain from BN		Swing		?

Malaysian general election, 2004
Party	Candidate	Votes	%	∆%
BN	G. Palanivel	27,807	67.61	▲5.57
PAS	Ismail Kamus	13,324	32.39	▲32.39
Total valid votes		41,131	100.00	
Total rejected ballots		1,406		
Unreturned ballots		55		
Turnout		42,592	72.77	▲1.72
Registered electors		58,529		
Majority		14,483	35.22	▲11.14
BN hold		Swing		

Malaysian general election, 1999
Party	Candidate	Votes	%	∆%
BN	G. Palanivel	22,143	62.04	▼18.11
PKR	Halili Rahmat	13,548	37.96	▲37.96
Total valid votes		35,691	100.00	
Total rejected ballots		1,280		
Unreturned ballots		224		
Turnout		37,195	71.05	▲2.33
Registered electors		52,350		
Majority		8,595	24.08	▼39.90
BN hold		Swing		

Malaysian general election, 1995
Party	Candidate	Votes	%	∆%
BN	G. Palanivel	26,829	80.15	▲16.41
S46	Adnan Din	5,414	16.17	▼20.09
DAP	Peng Kim Sing	1,231	3.68	▲3.68
Total valid votes		33,474	100.00	
Total rejected ballots		1,575		
Unreturned ballots		174		
Turnout		35,223	68.72	▼4.38
Registered electors		51,255		
Majority		21,415	63.98	▲36.50
BN hold		Swing		

Malaysian general election, 1990
Party	Candidate	Votes	%	∆%
BN	G. Palanivel	20,839	63.74	▼3.67
S46	Nazar Yakin	11,857	36.26	▲36.26
Total valid votes		32,696	100.00	
Total rejected ballots		1,610		
Unreturned ballots		284		
Turnout		34,306	73.10	▲3.10
Registered electors		46,933		
Majority		8,982	27.48	▼7.34
BN hold		Swing		

1990 Data was sourced from Tindak Malaysia's Github

Malaysian general election, 1986
Party	Candidate	Votes	%	∆%
BN	S. Subramaniam	19,201	67.41	▲18.71
SDP	Mohamed Arif Kamaruddin	9,281	32.59	▲32.59
Total valid votes		28,482	100.00	
Total rejected ballots		1,497		
Unreturned ballots		0		
Turnout		29,979	70.00	▼4.68
Registered electors		42,826		
Majority		9,920	34.82	▲9.41
BN hold		Swing		

Malaysian general election, 1982: Ulu Selangor
Party	Candidate	Votes	%	∆%
BN	Lee Kim Sai	14,138	48.70	▼21.57
Independent	Mohamed Arif Kamaruddin	6,761	23.29	▲23.29
Independent	Wong Kim Wah	5,232	18.02	▲18.02
DAP	Pan Su Peng	2,897	9.98	▼9.38
Total valid votes		29,028	100.00	
Total rejected ballots		1,060		
Unreturned ballots		0		
Turnout		30,088	74.68	▼1.65
Registered electors		40,289		
Majority		7,377	25.41	▼25.50
BN hold		Swing		

Malaysian general election, 1978: Ulu Selangor
Party	Candidate	Votes	%	∆%
BN	Michael Chen Wing Sum	17,670	70.27	▼4.87
DAP	Leong Ching Hoe	4,868	19.36	▼5.50
PAS	Yusof Ahmad	2,607	10.37	▲10.37
Total valid votes		25,145	100.00	
Total rejected ballots		1,376		
Unreturned ballots		0		
Turnout		26,521	76.33	▼4.50
Registered electors		34,744		
Majority		12,802	50.91	▲0.63
BN hold		Swing		

Malaysian general election, 1974: Ulu Selangor
Party	Candidate	Votes	%	∆%
BN	Michael Chen Wing Sum	15,323	75.14	▲75.14
DAP	G. Davidson	5,070	24.86	▼8.12
Total valid votes		20,393	100.00	
Total rejected ballots		1,287		
Unreturned ballots		0		
Turnout		21,680	80.83	▲6.83
Registered electors		27,973		
Majority		10,253	50.28	▼23.72
BN gain		Swing		

Malaysian general by-election, 3 June 1972: Ulu Selangor Upon the death of incumbent, Khaw Kai Boh
Party	Candidate	Votes	%	∆%
Alliance	Michael Chen Wing Sum	11,052	67.02	▲11.95
DAP	Lau Dak Kee	5,439	32.98	▼11.95
Total valid votes		16,491	100.00	
Total rejected ballots		288		
Unreturned ballots		0		
Turnout		16,779	74.00	▼2.05
Registered electors		22,675		
Majority		5,613	34.04	▲23.90
Alliance hold		Swing		

Malaysian general election, 1969: Ulu Selangor
Party	Candidate	Votes	%	∆%
Alliance	Khaw Kai Boh	8,278	55.07	▼14.08
DAP	Liong Ah Nai	6,755	44.93	▲44.93
Total valid votes		15,033	100.00	
Total rejected ballots		820		
Unreturned ballots		0		
Turnout		15,853	76.05	▼4.67
Registered electors		20,845		
Majority		1,523	10.14	▼28.16
Alliance hold		Swing		

Malaysian general election, 1964: Ulu Selangor
Party	Candidate	Votes	%	∆%
Alliance	Khaw Kai Boh	9,412	69.15	▲13.08
Socialist Front	Mohamed Nazar Nong	4,199	30.85	▲30.85
Total valid votes		13,611	100.00	
Total rejected ballots		717		
Unreturned ballots		0		
Turnout		14,328	80.72	▼1.95
Registered electors		17,750		
Majority		5,213	38.30	▼26.16
Alliance hold		Swing		

Malayan general election, 1959: Ulu Selangor
Party	Candidate	Votes	%	∆%
Alliance	Omar Ong Yoke Lin	6,537	56.07	▼26.33
Independent	Chai Yoke Kin	5,121	43.93	▲43.93
Total valid votes		11,658	100.00	
Total rejected ballots		143		
Unreturned ballots		0		
Turnout		11,801	82.67	▼3.08
Registered electors		14,274		
Majority		1,416	12.14	▼52.66
Alliance hold		Swing		

Malayan general election, 1955: Ulu Selangor
Party	Candidate	Votes	%
Alliance	Halimaton Abdul Majid	5,430	82.40
National Party	Abd Rahman Maulana	1,160	17.60
Total valid votes		6,590	100.00
Total rejected ballots			
Unreturned ballots			
Turnout		6,590	85.75
Registered electors		7,685	
Majority		4,270	64.80
This was a new constituency created.
Source(s): The Straits Times.
