= Sathia Prakash Nadarajan =

Malaysian politician

Coordinating Officer of the Hulu Selangor parliamentary seat
- Incumbent
- Assumed office 2023

Deputy Secretary-General of the People's Justice Party
- Incumbent
- Assumed office 2022
- President: Anwar Ibrahim
- Secretary-General: Saifuddin Nasution Ismail (2022–2024); Fuziah Salleh (2024–present)

Branch Chief of the People's Justice Party of Hulu Selangor
- Incumbent
- Assumed office 2022
- President: Anwar Ibrahim
- State Chairman: Amirudin Shari
- Preceded by: June Leow Hsiad Hui

Personal details
- Born: Sathia Prakash a/l Nadarajan; 19 June 1977 (age 49) Rawang, Selangor, Malaysia
- Party: Parti Keadilan Rakyat (PKR)
- Other political affiliations: Pakatan Harapan (PH)
- Education: Crimea State Medical University (MD)
- Occupation: Politician
- Profession: Medical doctor, Entrepreneur

Sathia Prakash s/o Nadarajan is a Malaysian politician and doctor. He served as Deputy Secretary-General of the People's Justice Party (PKR) and Branch Chief of Hulu Selangor of the People' Justice Party (PKR) since 2022. He is also the Coordinating Officer of the Hulu Selangor parliamentary seat. He is a member of People's Justice Party (PKR), a component party of Pakatan Harapan (PH) coalitions.

Sathia Prakash also a founder of SP Care Group.

== Political career ==
Sathia Prakash was elected as Deputy Secretary-General of the People's Justice Party and Hulu Selangor PKR Branch Chief in 2022. In March 2025, Sathia Prakash announced his candidacy for PKR vice-president post for upcoming party election. In April, He was reelected as Hulu Selangor PKR Branch Chief, defeating June Leow Hsiad Hui and Kalaichelvan Jaganathan. On 23 May 2025 party election, Sathia managed gather around 2,573 votes and placed in 8th place for vice-president post election.

== Election results ==
Parliament of Malaysia
Year	Constituency	Candidate	Votes	Pct	Opponent(s)	Votes	Pct	Ballots cast	Majority	Turnout
2022	P094 Hulu Selangor	Sathia Prakash Nadarajan (PKR)	45,261	36.97%	Mohd Hasnizan Harun (PAS)	46,823	38.24%	124,804	1,562	79.34%
2022	P094 Hulu Selangor	Sathia Prakash Nadarajan (PKR)	45,261	36.97%	Mohan Thangarasu (MIC)	27,050	22.09%	124,804	1,562	79.34%
2022	P094 Hulu Selangor	Sathia Prakash Nadarajan (PKR)	45,261	36.97%	Harumaini Omar (PEJUANG)	1,849	1.51%	124,804	1,562	79.34%
2022	P094 Hulu Selangor	Sathia Prakash Nadarajan (PKR)	45,261	36.97%	Haniza Mohamed Talha (PBM)	1,013	0.83%	124,804	1,562	79.34%
2022	P094 Hulu Selangor	Sathia Prakash Nadarajan (PKR)	45,261	36.97%	Azlinda Baroni (IND)	446	0.36%	124,804	1,562	79.34%
