= Kuala Kubu Bharu =

- Town and district capital
- Interactive map of Kuala Kubu Bharu
- Coordinates: 3°34′N 101°39′E
- Country: Malaysia
- State: Selangor
- District: Hulu Selangor
- Founded: 1780
- Established: 1925
- Establishment of town board: 1952
- Establishment of district council: 1 January 1977
- Municipality status: 21 October 2021
- Founder: Sultan Ibrahim Shah

Government
  - Body: Hulu Selangor Municipal Council (MPHS)
  - President: Shukri Mohamad Hamin
  - District Officer: Hj Musa Ranli

Area
  - Total: 1,756.301 km^{2} (678.112 sq mi)

Population (2010)
  - Total: 194,387
  - Density: 111/km^{2} (290/sq mi)
- Postcode: 44xxx
- Calling code: +6-03-60
- Vehicle registration: B, W

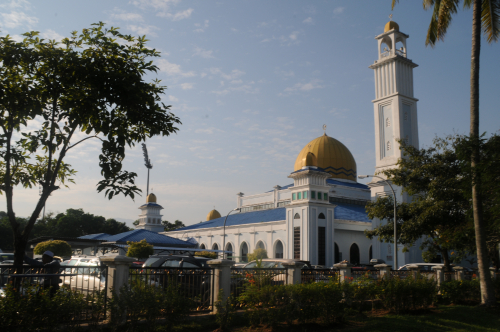
Kuala Kubu Bharu town Mosque.

Kuala Kubu Bharu in Hulu Selangor District

Kuala Kubu Bharu (also spelt Kuala Kubu Baru, Kuala Kubu Bahru or Kuala Kubu Baharu; abbreviated to KKB), is the district capital of Hulu Selangor District, Selangor, Malaysia. It is located 60 kilometres (37 mi) north of Kuala Lumpur and 80 kilometres (50 mi) from Shah Alam, the state capital. It serves as a gateway town to Fraser's Hill.

In 1883, the Sungai Selangor dam broke, causing a massive flood. It swept away the entire town the second time it broke in 1926, except for Guan Yin Gu Si Temple and Al-Hidayah Mosque. Following the flood, the British then relocated the town to a higher elevation and began to rebuild the town. Originally the town was named Kuala Kubu, however after the flood happened, the town was then renamed Kuala Kubu Bharu or New Kuala Kubu in English.

Kuala Kubu Bharu is arguably the first garden township in Asia, planned by the first government town planner of British Federated Malay States (FMS), Charles Crompton Reade in 1925.

The town is filled with pre-war buildings, mostly built by the locals, and they showcase the culture and architectural designs of that period of time.

== Politics ==
Kuala Kubu Bharu (N6) forms its own electoral district of the Selangor State Legislative Assembly. The area is currently represented by Pang Sock Tao from the Democratic Action Party after winning a by-election.

On the national level Kuala Kubu Bharu is part of the Hulu Selangor (P96) parliamentary constituency, currently represented by Mohd Hasnizan Harun of the federal opposition coalition Perikatan Nasional.

== Notable people ==
- Thomas Gerrard, World War I flying ace, was born in town
- Eja, Actress, host and model
