= Mohan Thangarasu =

Malaysian politician (born 1973)

Yang Berbahagia Datuk Mohan Thangarasu DPSM KMN

Senator Appointed by the Yang di-Pertuan Agong
- In office 1 December 2020 – 5 November 2022
- Monarch: Abdullah
- Prime Minister: Muhyiddin Yassin (2020–2021); Ismail Sabri Yaakob (2021–2022)
- In office 16 November 2017 – 15 November 2020
- Monarchs: Muhammad V (2017–2019); Abdullah (2019–2020)
- Prime Minister: Najib Razak (2017–2018); Mahathir Mohamad (2018–2020); Muhyiddin Yassin (2020)

Vice President of the Malaysian Indian Congress
- In office 6 November 2015 – 7 July 2024 Serving with Vigneswaran Sanasee (2015–2018); Jaspal Singh (2015–2018); Murugiah Thopasamy (2018–2024); Asojan Muniyandy (2018–2024); Vell Paari Samy Vellu (2019–2024); Kohilan Pillay Appu (2019–2024)
- President: Subramaniam Sathasivam (2015–2018); Vigneswaran Sanasee (2018–2024)
- Succeeded by: Nelson Renganathan

Personal details
- Born: Mohan a/l Thangarasu; 18 March 1973 (age 53) Batu 14, Puchong, Selangor
- Party: Malaysian Indian Congress (MIC)
- Other political affiliations: Barisan Nasional (BN)
- Occupation: Politician

Mohan s/o Thangarasu (born 18 March 1973) is a Malaysian politician who had served as a Senator from 2017 to 2022. He is a member of Malaysian Indian Congress (MIC), a component party of Barisan Nasional (BN) and has served as a Vice President of MIC from 2015 until 2024.

== Election results ==
Selangor State Legislative Assembly
Year	Constituency	Candidate	Votes	Pct	Opponent(s)	Votes	Pct	Ballot casts	Majority	Turnout
2008	N16 Batu Caves	Mohan Thangarasu (MIC)	7,376	38.49%	Amirudin Shari (PKR)	11,015	57.47%	19,165	3,639	74.51%
2008	N16 Batu Caves	Mohan Thangarasu (MIC)	7,376	38.49%	Azmi Hussain (IND)	379	1.98%	19,165	3,639	74.51%
2013	N49 Seri Andalas	Mohan Thangarasu (MIC)	15,858	32.45%	Xavier Jayakumar Arulanandam (PKR)	31,491	64.43%	49,552	15,633	87.30%
2013	N49 Seri Andalas	Mohan Thangarasu (MIC)	15,858	32.45%	Hanafiah Husin (IND)	871	1.78%	49,552	15,633	87.30%
2013	N49 Seri Andalas	Mohan Thangarasu (MIC)	15,858	32.45%	Uthayakumar Ponnusamy (IND)	614	1.26%	49,552	15,633	87.30%
2013	N49 Seri Andalas	Mohan Thangarasu (MIC)	15,858	32.45%	Kottappan Suppaiah (IND)	41	0.08%	49,552	15,633	87.30%

Parliament of Malaysia
Year	Constituency	Candidate	Votes	Pct	Opponent(s)	Votes	Pct	Ballots cast	Majority	Turnout
2022	P094 Hulu Selangor	Mohan Thangarasu (MIC)	27,050	22.09%	Mohd Hasnizan Harun (PAS)	46,823	38.24%	124,804	1,562	79.34%
2022	P094 Hulu Selangor	Mohan Thangarasu (MIC)	27,050	22.09%	Sathia Prakash Nadarajan (PKR)	45,261	36.97%	124,804	1,562	79.34%
2022	P094 Hulu Selangor	Mohan Thangarasu (MIC)	27,050	22.09%	Harumaini Omar (PEJUANG)	1,849	1.51%	124,804	1,562	79.34%
2022	P094 Hulu Selangor	Mohan Thangarasu (MIC)	27,050	22.09%	Haniza Mohamed Talha (PBM)	1,013	0.83%	124,804	1,562	79.34%
2022	P094 Hulu Selangor	Mohan Thangarasu (MIC)	27,050	22.09%	Azlinda Baroni (IND)	446	0.36%	124,804	1,562	79.34%

== Honours ==
- Malaysia
  - Officer of the Order of the Defender of the Realm (KMN) (2006)
- Malacca
  - Companion Class II of the Exalted Order of Malacca (DPSM) – Datuk (2013)
