= Khairul Azhari Saut =

Malaysian politician and businessman

Tuan Khairul Azhari Saut
- خير الأزهري سعود

Member of the Hulu Selangor District Council
- In office 2018–2020
- Yang Dipertua: Shukri Mohamad Hamin

Personal details
- Born: Khairul Azhari bin Saut; 15 January 1970 (age 56) Felda Sungai Tengi, Kuala Kubu Bharu, Hulu Selangor, Selangor, Malaysia
- Party: Malaysian United Indigenous Party (BERSATU) (since 2016)
- Other political affiliations: Pakatan Harapan (PH) (2016–2020); Perikatan Nasional (PN) (since 2020)
- Education: University of Malaya (DM); Universiti Malaysia Pahang Al-Sultan Abdullah (MBM)
- Occupation: Businessman; politician

Khairul Azhari bin Saut (Jawi: خير الأزهري بن سعود; born 15 January 1970) is a Malaysian politician and businessman who was a candidate for the Member of the Selangor State Legislative Assembly (MLA) for Kuala Kubu Baharu in the Kuala Kubu Baharu by-election in May 2024. He is a member and Acting Division Chief of Hulu Selangor of the Malaysian United Indigenous Party (BERSATU), a component party of the Perikatan Nasional (PN) coalition. He served as Member of the Hulu Selangor District Council from 2018 to 2020.

== Early life and education ==
Khairul Azhari bin Saut was born in FELDA Sungai Tengi, Kuala Kubu Bharu, Selangor, Malaysia. He received his early education at SK Felda Sungai Tengi, Kuala Kubu Bharu and SMK Felda Soeharto, Kuala Kubu Bharu, before continuing his studies at University of Malaya for an Executive Diploma in Management (DM) in 2019 and University Malaysia Pahang for Executive Masters in Business Management (MBM) in 2021.

== Early and business career ==
Khairul Azhari is a businessman. He is the general manager of Global Valley Venture Sdn Bhd, and has worked as a general manager at Petrogas Resources; head of oil and gas department at Damini Corporation; and financial executives at Bursa Malaysia.

== Political career ==
Khairul Azhari joined Malaysian United Indigenous Party since 2016 and became one of the founders of the party in Hulu Selangor. He was appointed as Deputy Head of the Hulu Selangor Division in 2016 to 2019. Then he was appointed as Deputy Head of the Hulu Selangor Division in 2019 to 2023, before being appointed acting Head of the Hulu Selangor Division in 2023. He was appointed as a Member of the Hulu Selangor District Council in 2018 to 2020. He was named as an election candidate representing the Perikatan Nasional for the Kuala Kubu Baharu by-election that takes place on 11 May 2024.

== Personal life ==
Khairul Azhari is married and has three children.

== Election results ==
Selangor State Legislative Assembly
Year	Constituency	Candidate	Votes	Pct	Opponent(s)	Votes	Pct	Ballots cast	Majority	Turnout
2024	N06 Kuala Kubu Baharu	Khairul Azhari Saut (BERSATU)	10,131	41.40%	Pang Sock Tao (DAP)	14,000	57.21%	24,471	3,869	61.51%
2024	N06 Kuala Kubu Baharu	Khairul Azhari Saut (BERSATU)	10,131	41.40%	Eris Nyau Ke Xin (IND)	188	0.77%	24,471	3,869	61.51%
2024	N06 Kuala Kubu Baharu	Khairul Azhari Saut (BERSATU)	10,131	41.40%	Hafizah Zainuddin (PRM)	152	0.62%	24,471	3,869	61.51%
