= Muhammad Muhammad Taib =

Malaysian politician

Yang Berbahagia Tan Sri Dato' Seri Muhammad Muhammad Taib PSM SPMS DGSM DPMS SSA AMN PJK
- محمد محمد طيب

Minister of Rural and Regional Development
- In office 19 March 2008 – 9 April 2009
- Monarch: Mizan Zainal Abidin
- Prime Minister: Abdullah Ahmad Badawi
- Deputy: Joseph Kurup; Joseph Entulu Belaun
- Preceded by: Abdul Aziz Shamsuddin
- Succeeded by: Shafie Apdal
- Constituency: Senator

11th Menteri Besar of Selangor
- In office 14 August 1986 – 14 April 1997
- Monarch: Salahuddin
- Preceded by: Ahmad Razali Mohamad Ali
- Succeeded by: Abu Hassan Omar
- Constituency: Batang Kali

Member of the Selangor State Legislative Assembly for Batang Kali
- In office 22 April 1982 – 29 November 1999
- Preceded by: Rosedin Yaacob (BN–UMNO)
- Succeeded by: Zainal Abidin Sakom (BN–UMNO)
- Majority: 4,162 (1982); Uncontested (1986); 5,190 (1990); Uncontested (1995)

Personal details
- Born: Muhammad bin Muhammad Taib; 29 July 1945 (age 81) Hulu Selangor, Selangor, Japanese occupation of Malaya (now Malaysia)
- Citizenship: Malaysian
- Party: United Malays National Organisation (UMNO) (1964–2013, 2017–present); Malaysian Islamic Party (PAS) (2013–2015); People's Justice Party (PKR) (2015–2017)
- Other political affiliations: Alliance Party (1964–1974); Barisan Nasional (BN) (1974–2013, 2017–present); Pakatan Rakyat (PR) (2013–2015); Pakatan Harapan (PH) (2015–2017)
- Spouse(s): Asbi Rohani Asnan; Tengku Puteri Zahariah binti Sultan Salehuddin Abdul Aziz Shah (divorced); Rodzina Hayati Tajul Ariffin
- Children: 11
- Education: University of Malaya
- Occupation: Politician, Teacher
- Website: https://mattaib.wordpress.com/

Muhammad bin Muhammad Taib (Jawi: محمد بن محمد طيب; born 29 July 1945), also fondly known as Mat Taib and also Mat Tyson, is a Malaysian politician who currently is a member of United Malays National Organisation (UMNO), a major component of Barisan Nasional (BN) coalition. He was the former Menteri Besar of Selangor and the former Rural and Regional Development Minister. Muhammad was also the former UMNO vice-president.

== Early life and education ==
Born in Kampung Sungai Manggis, Kuala Kalumpang, Hulu Selangor, he was of Minangkabau descent from Rao, West Sumatera. He went to an English Primary School in Kuala Kubu Baru. Muhammad is a graduate from Universiti Malaya with a first-class degree in History and Malay studies, and was also a former teacher at SMK Kuala Kubu Baru.

== Political career ==
The political veteran joined UMNO in 1964, and quickly rose within its ranks to be appointed as Selangor Umno deputy state liaison committee chief and elected UMNO vice-president. In 1993, Muhammad and two other top party leaders then - Najib Razak and Muhyiddin Yassin - won the vice-presidency after they joined Anwar Ibrahim who won the deputy presidency uncontested; forming Vision Team (Team Wawasan) to face the UMNO internal party election.

Muhammad was former Selangor state assemblyman of Batang Kali constituency for four terms, winning in the general elections of 1982, 1986, 1990 and 1995. He served as Menteri Besar of Selangor from 1986 to 1997. However, he was forced to resign as Selangor Menteri Besar in April 1997 after he was charged in Australia over currency irregularities involving more than $A1.2 million (RM2.9 million).

In 2006, he was appointed as a senator in the Dewan Negara, the upper house of the Parliament of Malaysia. This allowed him to be appointed as a minister by Prime Minister Abdullah Ahmad Badawi in March 2008. He contested the post of UMNO deputy president in March 2009 but came out second to Muhyiddin Yassin. His stint in the Cabinet ended after a reshuffling by new Prime Minister Najib Razak in April 2009.

On 14 April 2013, Muhammad joined opposition Pan-Malaysian Islamic Party (PAS), a component party of Pakatan Rakyat (PR) then. He was formally introduced by the party on 22 April 2013, just two days after the 13th General Election nomination day to avoid allegations that he took the step to be nominated in the general election. PAS is the only party that can lead Malaysia towards Islam, Muhammad said. In previous statements Muhammad was a strong critic for the Pakatan Rakyat led state government of Selangor. He stated that Pakatan Rakyat Selangor, under the helm of the Menteri Besar of Selangor Khalid Ibrahim was losing grip of the state. He even stated that he believes that Saiful Bukhari Azlan, the accuser of Anwar Ibrahim sexual escapades was the real victims and no one is helping Saiful Bukhari.

On 10 September 2015, Muhammad quit PAS as he was involved in the Gerakan Harapan Baru movement and was going to join a new party called AMANAH, but instead he joined People's Justice Party (PKR) of the Pakatan Harapan (PH) opposition coalition.

On 17 September 2017, Muhammad rejoined UMNO announced by Najib Razak in a special media conference after leaving it to be with the opposition for four years.

== Controversies ==
In 1987, Muhammad, during his early tenure as Selangor's Menteri Besar angered the Sultan of Selangor when it was found that he had secretly married the ruler's daughter Tengku Puteri Zahariah in Sungai Golok, Thailand. The late sultan later accepted his apologies.

In 1997, Muhammad was forced to resign after he was charged in Australia with making false currency declarations after millions of dollars were found in his suitcase as he was leaving the country. However, he was found not guilty, after claiming he could not understand the declaration forms which were in English. Somehow, in a later development, an investigative committee found that the court had erred in its judgment.

The prosecution at Brisbane Federal Court on 19 August 1997 as for his failure to declare bringing over A$5,000. He and his wife stay a few weeks in Brisbane and wishing to build a luxury house on a 4,500 hectare land at Gold Coast, in Queensland. After that he wish to fly to New Zealand. The land at Sovereign Island was registered under his wife's name Asbi Rohani Binti Asnan which was bought a year earlier for $3 million. Muhammad Taib was charged with failure to declare his assets.

== Personal life ==
Muhammad first married Asbi Rohani Asnan during his early teaching career in Tanjung Malim, and they had four daughters and one son together.

He later married Tengku Puteri Zahariah binti Sultan Salahuddin Abdul Aziz Shah, the daughter of the late Sultan of Selangor, Sultan Salahuddin Abdul Aziz Shah. During this marriage, he was granted the honorific title Yang Amat Mulia and later Yang Berhormat Mulia. The couple had one son before divorcing.

Muhammad also married Dr. Rodzina Hayati Tajul Ariffin, with whom he had four sons and one daughter.

== Election results ==
Selangor State Legislative Assembly
Year	Constituency	Candidate	Votes	Pct	Opponent(s)	Votes	Pct	Ballots cast	Majority	Turnout
1982	N09 Batang Kali	Muhammad Muhammad Taib (UMNO)	6,939	67.90%	Hong Chin Toh (DAP)	2,777	27.17%	10,220	4,162	79.00%
1986	N09 Batang Kali	Muhammad Muhammad Taib (UMNO)	Unopposed							
1990	N09 Batang Kali	Muhammad Muhammad Taib (UMNO)	8,575	68.70%	Sinniah Periannan (DAP)	3,385	27.12%	12,482	5,190	75.82%
1995	N09 Batang Kali	Muhammad Muhammad Taib (UMNO)	Unopposed							

== Honours ==
=== Honours of Malaysia ===
- Malaysia
  - Commander of the Order of Loyalty to the Crown of Malaysia (PSM) – Tan Sri (1989)
  - Member of the Order of the Defender of the Realm (AMN) (1985)
- Malacca
  - Grand Commander of the Exalted Order of Malacca (DGSM) – Datuk Seri (1989)
- Selangor
  - Knight Grand Commander of the Order of the Crown of Selangor (SPMS) – Dato' Seri (1991)
  - Knight Commander of the Order of the Crown of Selangor (DPMS) – Dato' (1987)
  - Companion of the Order of Sultan Salahuddin Abdul Aziz Shah (SSA) (1985)
  - Recipient of the Meritorious Service Medal (PJK) (1982)

== See also ==
- Batang Kali (state constituency)

Political offices
Preceded by Ahmad Razali Mohamad Ali	Chief Minister of Selangor; 14 August 1986 – 14 April 1997	Succeeded by Abu Hassan Haji Omar
