= Harumaini Omar =

Malaysian politician

Member of the Selangor State Legislative Assembly for Batang Kali
- In office 9 May 2018 – 16 February 2023
- Preceded by: Mat Nadzari Ahmad Dahlan (BN–UMNO)
- Succeeded by: Muhammad Muhaimin Harith Abdullah Sani (PN–BERSATU)
- Majority: 8,315 (2018)

Personal details
- Born: Harumaini bin Omar Malaysia
- Party: Malaysian United Indigenous Party (BERSATU) (–2020); Homeland Fighters Party (PEJUANG) (since 2020)
- Other political affiliations: Pakatan Harapan (PH) (–2020); Perikatan Nasional (PN) (February–August 2020)
- Education: Universiti Putra Malaysia (Master of Business and Administration)

Harumaini bin Omar is a Malaysian politician who served as Member of the Selangor State Legislative Assembly (MLA) for Batang Kali from May 2018 to his removal from office in February 2023. He is a member of the Homeland Fighters Party (PEJUANG) and was a member of the Malaysian United Indigenous Party (BERSATU), a component party of the Perikatan Nasional (PN) and formerly the Pakatan Harapan (PH) coalitions.

== Politics ==
He is a new face contesting for the Batang Kali state assembly seat. He won in a three-cornered contest against the incumbent, Dato' Mat Nadzari Ahmad Dahlan from BN and Mohd Hasnizan Harun from PAS in the last GE14.

He membership as a Member of the Selangor State Legislative Assembly for Batang Kali was terminated on 16 February 2023 for failing to appear without permission for more than 6 months as stipulated in the law of the Selangor State Legislative Assembly.

== Election results ==
Selangor State Legislative Assembly
Year	Constituency	Candidate	Votes	Pct	Opponent(s)	Votes	Pct	Ballots cast	Majority	Turnout
2018	N07 Batang Kali	Harumaini Omar (BERSATU)	21,536	51.08%	Mat Nadzari Ahmad Dahlan (UMNO)	13,221	31.35%	42,165	8,315	87.46%
2018	N07 Batang Kali	Harumaini Omar (BERSATU)	21,536	51.08%	Mohd Hasnizan Harun (PAS)	7,408	17.57%	42,165	8,315	87.46%

Parliament of Malaysia
Year	Constituency	Candidate	Votes	Pct	Opponent(s)	Votes	Pct	Ballots cast	Majority	Turnout
2022	P094 Hulu Selangor	Harumaini Omar (PEJUANG)	1,849	1.51%	Mohd Hasnizan Harun (PAS)	46,823	38.24%	124,804	1,562	79.34%
2022	P094 Hulu Selangor	Harumaini Omar (PEJUANG)	1,849	1.51%	Sathia Prakash Nadarajan (PKR)	45,261	36.97%	124,804	1,562	79.34%
2022	P094 Hulu Selangor	Harumaini Omar (PEJUANG)	1,849	1.51%	Mohan Thangarasu (MIC)	27,050	22.09%	124,804	1,562	79.34%
2022	P094 Hulu Selangor	Harumaini Omar (PEJUANG)	1,849	1.51%	Haniza Mohamed Talha (PBM)	1,013	0.83%	124,804	1,562	79.34%
2022	P094 Hulu Selangor	Harumaini Omar (PEJUANG)	1,849	1.51%	Azlinda Baroni (IND)	446	0.36%	124,804	1,562	79.34%

== See also ==
- Batang Kali (state constituency)
