= Zainal Abidin Sakom =

Malaysian politician

Yang Berbahagia Dato' Zainal Abidin Sakom DSSA AMS JP AMN
- زين العابدين ساکوم

Chairman of the Yayasan Basmi Kemiskinan
- Incumbent
- Assumed office 1990
- Preceded by: Position established

Member of the Selangor State Legislative Assembly for Batang Kali
- In office 25 November 1999 – 8 March 2008
- Preceded by: Muhammad Muhammad Taib (BN–UMNO)
- Succeeded by: Mohd Isa Abu Kasim (BN–UMNO)
- Majority: 4,907 (1999); 8,828 (2004)

Member of the Selangor State Legislative Assembly for Hulu Bernam
- In office 25 April 1995 – 25 November 1999
- Preceded by: Constituency created
- Succeeded by: Mohamed Idris Abu Bakar (BN–UMNO)
- Majority: 9,756 (1995)

Personal details
- Born: Zainal Abidin bin Sakom; 14 August 1950 (age 75) Selangor, Federation of Malaya
- Citizenship: Malaysian
- Party: United Malays National Organisation (UMNO)
- Other political affiliations: Barisan Nasional (BN)
- Occupation: Politician
- Zainal Abidin Sakom on Facebook

Zainal Abidin bin Sakom (born 14 August 1950) is a Malaysian politician and currently as chairman of Poverty Eradication.

== Election results ==
Selangor State Legislative Assembly
Year	Constituency	Candidate	Votes	Pct	Opponent(s)	Votes	Pct	Ballots cast	Majority	Turnout
1995	N07 Hulu Bernam	Zainal Abidin Sakom (UMNO)	10,579	92.78%	Abdul Majid Hasan (PAS)	823	7.22%	11,756	9,756	68.72%
1999	N09 Batang Kali	Zainal Abidin Sakom (UMNO)	9,048	68.60%	Sharifuddin Budin (KeADILan)	4,141	31.40%	13,648	4,907	72.91%
2004	N07 Batang Kali	Zainal Abidin Sakom (UMNO)	12,898	76.01%	Halil Rahmat (PKR)	4,070	23.99%	17,386	8,828	76.82%

== Honours ==
=== Honours of Malaysia ===
- Malaysia
  - Member of the Order of the Defender of the Realm (AMN) (1995)
- Selangor
  - Knight Companion of the Order of Sultan Salahuddin Abdul Aziz Shah (DSSA) – Dato' (1996)
  - Member of the Order of the Crown of Selangor (AMS) (1988)
  - Justice of the Peace (JP) (1991)
