= Mui'zzuddeen Mahyuddin =

Malaysian politician

Yang Berhormat Tuan Mui'zzuddeen Mahyuddin MLA
- معزالدين محیی الدین

Member of the Selangor State Legislative Assembly for Hulu Bernam
- Incumbent
- Assumed office 12 August 2023
- Preceded by: Rosni Sohar (BN–UMNO)
- Majority: 669 (2023)

Personal details
- Born: Mui'zzuddeen bin Mahyuddin; 29 April 1988 (age 38)
- Citizenship: Malaysian
- Party: Malaysian Islamic Party (PAS)
- Other political affiliations: Gagasan Sejahtera (GS) (2016–2020); Perikatan Nasional (PN) (since 2020)
- Education: Sekolah Kebangsaan Serendah (SK Serendah); Sekolah Menengah Agama Izzuddin Shah (SMA Izzuddin Shah); Sekolah Menengah Agama Persekutuan Kajang (SMA Persekutuan Kajang)
- Alma mater: Universiti Tenaga Nasional (UNITEN) (Bachelor's degree in mechanical engineering)
- Occupation: Politician
- Profession: Automotive engineer

Mui'zzuddeen bin Mahyuddin (born 29 April 1988), simply known as Muiz Mahyuddin, is a Malaysian politician and automotive engineer who has served as Member of the Selangor State Legislative Assembly (MLA) for Hulu Bernam since August 2023. He is a member and Division Committee Member of Hulu Selangor of the Malaysian Islamic Party (PAS), a component party of the Perikatan Nasional (PN) and formerly Gagasan Sejahtera (GS) coalitions. He served as the Division Secretary of PAS of Hulu Selangor from 2015 to 2021.

== Political career ==
=== Member of the Selangor State Legislative Assembly (since 2023) ===
==== 2023 Selangor state election ====
In the 2023 Selangor state election, Mui'zzuddeen made his electoral debut after being nominated by PN to contest the Hulu Bernam state seat. Mui'zzuddeen won the seat and was elected to the Selangor State Legislative Assembly as the Hulu Bernam MLA for the first term after narrowly defeating Mohd Amran Mohd Sakir of Pakatan Harapan (PH) by a majority of only 669 votes.

== Election results ==
Selangor State Legislative Assembly
Year	Constituency		Votes	Pct	Opponent(s)	Votes	Pct	Ballots cast	Majority	Turnout
2023	N05 Hulu Bernam	Mui'zzuddeen Mahyuddin (PAS)	10,718	51.61%	Mohd Amran Mohd Sakir (AMANAH)	10,049	48.39%	20,767	669	68.39%
