= Rosni Sohar =

Malaysian politician

Yang Berhormat Senator Datuk Rosni Sohar PJN DMSM
- روسني صحار

Senator Appointed by the Yang di-Pertuan Agong
- Incumbent
- Assumed office 9 January 2025
- Monarch: Ibrahim
- Prime Minister: Anwar Ibrahim

Member of the Selangor State Legislative Assembly for Hulu Bernam
- In office 5 May 2013 – 12 August 2023
- Preceded by: Mohamed Idris Abu Bakar (BN–UMNO)
- Succeeded by: Mui'zzuddeen Mahyuddin (PN–PAS)
- Majority: 3,032 (2013); 20 (2018)

Faction represented in the Selangor State Legislative Assembly
- 2013–2023: Barisan Nasional

Personal details
- Born: Rosni binti Sohar; 1 February 1958 (age 68) Selangor, Federation of Malaya (now Malaysia)
- Party: United Malays National Organisation (UMNO)
- Other political affiliations: Barisan Nasional (BN)
- Spouse: Aziz Deraman (died 2019)
- Education: Universiti Utara Malaysia
- Occupation: Politician

Rosni binti Sohar (born 1 February 1958) is a Malaysian politician who has served as a Senator since January 2025. She served as Member of the Selangor State Legislative Assembly (MLA) for Hulu Bernam from May 2013 to August 2023. She is a member of the United Malays National Organisation (UMNO), a component party of the Barisan Nasional (BN) coalition.

== Election results ==
Selangor State Legislative Assembly
Year	Constituency	Candidate	Votes	Pct	Opponent(s)	Votes	Pct	Ballots cast	Majority	Turnout
2013	N05 Hulu Bernam	Rosni Sohar (UMNO)	10,397	58.54%	Muhamad Idris Ahmad (PAS)	7,365	41.46%	18,124	3,032	86.58%
2018	N05 Hulu Bernam	Rosni Sohar (UMNO)	8,164	43.28%	Mohd Amran Sakir (AMANAH)	8,144	43.18%	19,243	20	84.19%
2018	N05 Hulu Bernam	Rosni Sohar (UMNO)	8,164	43.28%	Mohammed Salleh Ri (PAS)	2,554	13.54%	19,243	20	84.19%

== Honours ==
- Malaysia
  - Commander of the Order of Meritorious Service (PJN) – Datuk (2017)
  - Recipient of the 17th Yang di-Pertuan Agong Installation Medal (2025)
- Malacca
  - Companion Class I of the Exalted Order of Malacca (DMSM) – Datuk (2010)

== See also ==
- Members of the Dewan Negara, 15th Malaysian Parliament
