= Thomas Gerrard (RAF officer) =

British World War I flying ace

Thomas Francis Netterville Gerrard
- Born: 13 August 1897; Kuala Kubu Bharu, Selangor, Federated Malay States
- Died: 14 July 1923 (aged 25); Mosul, Mandatory Iraq
- Burial place: Ma'asker Al Raschid RAF Cemetery, Baghdad, Iraq
- Military career
- Allegiance: United Kingdom
- Branch: Royal Navy; Royal Air Force
- Service years: 1914–1923
- Rank: Major
- Nickname: "Teddy"
- Units: 'A' Squadron/No. 1 Squadron RNAS; No. 208 Squadron RAF; No. 1 Squadron RAF
- Commands: No. 209 Squadron RAF
- Conflicts: World War I
- Awards: Distinguished Service Cross; Croix de guerre (France)

Major Thomas Francis Netterville Gerrard DSC (13 August 1897 – 14 July 1923) was a British World War I flying ace credited with ten aerial victories. He died following a post-war equestrian accident.

== Early life and background ==
Gerrard was born in Malaysia, where his father Percy Netterville Gerrard (1870–1915) was a medical doctor of Anglo-Irish descent. His mother Alice Gerrard died while he was still young. By 1901 Thomas was living in his father's home city of Dublin with his grandmother, while his father married Clare Hoffman in May 1905. His father later served as a captain in the Malay States Volunteer Rifles, and was killed in action during the Singapore Mutiny. His uncle Eugene Louis Gerrard also served in the RNAS and RAF during World War I, rising to the rank of Air Commodore before retiring in 1929.

== World War I ==
Gerrard entered the Royal Naval Air Service as a probationary flight sub-lieutenant, and was confirmed in the rank of flight sub-lieutenant on 21 November 1914. He was awarded Royal Aero Club Aviator's Certificate No. 1180 at RNAS Hendon on 11 April 1915, and was stationed at RNAS Redcar, where on 4 July he ran his Caudron G.3 through a fence on landing, sustaining minor damage. He was promoted to flight lieutenant on 1 January 1916.

Gerrard first flew a FBA flying boat from the port of Dover. He was then transferred to "A" Squadron of the RNAS. While flying a Nieuport fighter aircraft, he scored his first victory on 8 July 1916.

On 5 December 1916, Gerrard was appointed acting flight commander, and this was confirmed on 31 December. After transferring to No. 1 Naval Squadron, Gerrard was assigned to fly Sopwith Triplanes; he would score eight victories with them between April and June 1917.

Gerrard was subsequently awarded the Distinguished Service Cross. The citation for it appeared in The London Gazette of 20 July 1917:

In recognition of his services during an air fight on 4 June 1917. This officer led his flight against 15-20 hostile aeroplanes, and alone had ten engagements with these machines. He attacked one, and fired sixty rounds into its cockpit at point-blank range, the enemy machine rolling over and over for 3,000 feet, and then falling vertically out of control. He then attacked another enemy machine which had dived on to one of our machines from behind, and with the help of a Scout he shot it down, the enemy being seen to crash to the ground. Another hostile scout was then attacked by pilot, end-on, and received a long burst at very close range, the enemy going down in a spin, but apparently righting himself lower down. During this last encounter Flt. Cdr. Gerrard's machine was riddled with bullets, but, by fine piloting, he landed safely, although all but his lateral controls were shot away and his machine damaged to such an extent as to require return to Depot for complete rebuilding. This officer has now destroyed at least seven hostile aircraft. He was on active service in France and Belgium from April to September, 1916, and during that period performed much valuable work.

During a brief posting with No. 208 Squadron, he used a Sopwith Camel to down his tenth and final victim on 6 April 1918. On 30 May 1918, Gerrard was promoted to temporary major, and was served as commander of No. 209 Squadron.

List of aerial victories
| No. | Date/time | Aircraft | Foe | Result | Location | Notes |
|---|---|---|---|---|---|---|
| 1 | 8 July 1916 @ 1405 hours | Nieuport fighter | Fokker Eindekker | Driven down out of control | Vicinity of Ostend, Belgium | |
| 2 | 14 April 1917 @ 0820 hours | Sopwith Triplane serial number N5440 | Enemy aircraft | Driven down out of control | Épinoy, France | |
| 3 | 24 April 1917 @ 1115 hours | Sopwith Triplane s/n N5440 | Albatros D.III fighter | Destroyed | Noyelles, France | |
| 4 | 24 April 1917 @ 1120 hours | Sopwith Triplane s/n N5440 | Albatros D.III | Driven down out of control | South of Wancourt, France | |
| 5 | 29 April 1917 @ 1110 hours | Sopwith Triplane s/n N5440 | Albatros D.III | Driven down out of control | Épinoy | |
| 6 | 19 May 1917 @ 1945 hours | Sopwith Triplane s/n N5440 | Albatros D.III | Driven down out of control | Henin-Liétard | |
| 7 | 4 June 1917 @ 0750 hours | Sopwith Triplane s/n N5440 | Albatros D.III | Driven down out of control | Moorslede-Menen, Belgium | |
| 8 | 4 June 1917 @ 0800 hours | Sopwith Triplane s/n N5440 | Albatros D.III | Destroyed | Mooreslede-Menen | Shared with Captain Philip F. Fullard |
| 9 | 7 June 1917 @ 0600 hours | Sopwith Triplane s/n N6291 | Albatros D.III | Destroyed | Ypres, Belgium | |
| 10 | 6 April 1918 @ 1130 hours | Sopwith Camel s/n B7196 | Fokker Triplane fighter | Driven down out of control | Lens | Shared with Lieutenants Wilfred Sneath and Gerald Cooper |

== Post World War I ==
On 22 April 1919, Gerrard relinquished his posting as acting major and reverted to the rank of captain. On 1 August 1919 he was granted a permanent commission as a lieutenant in the RAF. On 1 January 1921, he was promoted to flight lieutenant.

On 5 March 1921, he hosted a reunion dinner for 209 Squadron, with 47 attendees. On 29 June 1921, he attended the third annual reunion of RNAS veterans of the Dunkirk Station. Gerrard also participated in the Hendon Air Show in 1921, flying a Sopwith Snipe.

On 21 October 1922, he was transferred from the Central Flying School (Inland Area) to the No. 5 Flying Training School (Inland Area), and from there was transferred to No. 1 Squadron RAF in Iraq on 23 February 1923.

On 14 July 1923 Gerrard died from a cerebral haemorrhage in the Station Sick Quarters (SSQ) at Mosul after a fall from his polo pony, and was buried at the Hinaidi RAF Peace Cemetery (renamed Ma'asker Al Raschid RAF Cemetery in 1961) in the Zafaraniyah district of Baghdad in Plot 2 Row C Grave 11..
