= Mohd Hasnizan Harun =

Malaysian politician

Yang Berhormat Tuan Mohd Hasnizan Harun MP
- محمّد حسن ظن هارون

Member of the Malaysian Parliament for Hulu Selangor
- Incumbent
- Assumed office 19 November 2022
- Preceded by: June Leow Hsiad Hui (PH–PKR)
- Majority: 1,562 (2022)

Personal details
- Born: Mohd Hasnizan bin Harun Malaysia
- Party: Malaysian Islamic Party (PAS)
- Other political affiliations: Gagasan Sejahtera (GS) (2016–2020); Perikatan Nasional (PN) (since 2020)
- Education: Universiti Malaya; Universiti Kebangsaan Malaysia

Mohd Hasnizan bin Harun is a Malaysian politician who has served as the Member of Parliament (MP) for Hulu Selangor since November 2022. He is a member of the Malaysian Islamic Party (PAS), a component party of Perikatan Nasional (PN) and formerly Gagasan Sejahtera (GS) coalitions.

== Election results ==
Selangor State Legislative Assembly
| Year | Constituency | Candidate | Votes | Pct | Opponent(s) | Votes | Pct | Ballots cast | Majority | Turnout |
|---|---|---|---|---|---|---|---|---|---|---|
| 2018 | N07 Batang Kali | Mohd Hasnizan Harun (PAS) | 7,408 | 17.57% | Harumaini Omar (BERSATU) | 21,536 | 51.08% | 42,165 | 8,315 | 87.46% |
| 2018 | N07 Batang Kali | Mohd Hasnizan Harun (PAS) | 7,408 | 17.57% | Mat Nadzari Ahmad Dahlan (UMNO) | 13,221 | 31.35% | 42,165 | 8,315 | 87.46% |

Parliament of Malaysia
| Year | Constituency | Candidate | Votes | Pct | Opponent(s) | Votes | Pct | Ballots cast | Majority | Turnout |
|---|---|---|---|---|---|---|---|---|---|---|
| 2022 | P094 Hulu Selangor | Mohd Hasnizan Harun (PAS) | 46,823 | 38.24% | Sathia Prakash Nadarajan (PKR) | 45,261 | 36.97% | 124,804 | 1,562 | 79.34% |
| 2022 | P094 Hulu Selangor | Mohd Hasnizan Harun (PAS) | 46,823 | 38.24% | Mohan Thangarasu (MIC) | 27,050 | 22.09% | 124,804 | 1,562 | 79.34% |
| 2022 | P094 Hulu Selangor | Mohd Hasnizan Harun (PAS) | 46,823 | 38.24% | Harumaini Omar (PEJUANG) | 1,849 | 1.51% | 124,804 | 1,562 | 79.34% |
| 2022 | P094 Hulu Selangor | Mohd Hasnizan Harun (PAS) | 46,823 | 38.24% | Haniza Mohamed Talha (PBM) | 1,013 | 0.83% | 124,804 | 1,562 | 79.34% |
| 2022 | P094 Hulu Selangor | Mohd Hasnizan Harun (PAS) | 46,823 | 38.24% | Azlinda Baroni (IND) | 446 | 0.36% | 124,804 | 1,562 | 79.34% |

== Honours ==
=== Honours of Malaysia ===
- Malaysia
  - Recipient of the 17th Yang di-Pertuan Agong Installation Medal (2024)

== See also ==
- Hulu Selangor (federal constituency)
