= Al Hidayah Mosque =

Mosque in Kuala Kubu Bharu, Selangor, Malaysia

- Masjid Al Hidayah

Religion
- Affiliation: Islam
- Branch/tradition: Sunni

Location
- Location: Kuala Kubu Bharu, Selangor, Malaysia

Architecture
- Type: mosque

The Al Hidayah Mosque (Malay: Masjid Lama Al-Hidayah) is a historic mosque located in Ampang Pecah, Kuala Kubu Bharu, in Selangor, Malaysia. It is the likely the only surviving building of the original town of Kuala Kubu.

== See also ==
- Islam in Malaysia
