= Lee Kee Hiong =

Malaysian politician (1966–2024)

- 李继香

Member of the Selangor State Legislative Assembly for Kuala Kubu Baharu
- In office 5 May 2013 – 21 March 2024
- Preceded by: Wong Koon Mun (BN–MCA)
- Succeeded by: Pang Sock Tao (PH–DAP)
- Majority: 1,702 (2013); 7,134 (2018); 4,119 (2023)

Personal details
- Born: Lee Kee Hiong; 16 March 1966 Muar, Johor, Malaysia
- Died: 21 March 2024 (aged 58) Petaling Jaya, Selangor, Malaysia
- Cause of death: Ovarian cancer
- Resting place: Nirvana Crematorium, Shah Alam, Selangor, Malaysia
- Citizenship: Malaysian
- Party: Democratic Action Party (DAP)
- Other political affiliations: Gagasan Rakyat (GR) (1993–1996); Barisan Alternatif (BA) (1999–2004); Pakatan Rakyat (PR) (2008–2015); Pakatan Harapan (PH) (2015–2024)
- Spouse: Lee Jenn Huei
- Education: Pay Fong Chinese National Type School 1 Tun Tuah National Secondary School; Melaka High National Secondary School
- Alma mater: University of Malaya (Bachelor's degree in Resource Economics & Master's degree in Librarian and Information Science)
- Occupation: Politician

Lee Kee Hiong (16 March 1966 – 21 March 2024) was a Malaysian politician who served as Member of the Selangor State Legislative Assembly (MLA) for Kuala Kubu Baharu from May 2013 to her death in March 2024. She was a member and State Women Chief of Selangor of the Democratic Action Party (DAP), a component party of Pakatan Harapan (PH) and formerly Pakatan Rakyat (PR), Barisan Alternatif (BA) and Gagasan Rakyat (GR) coalitions. She was Member of the Kajang Municipal Council (MPKj) from 2008 to 2013, Political Secretary and Special Assistant to DAP veteran Lim Kit Siang and Member of the Board of Directors of the Women Empowerment Centre (PWB).

== Death ==
Lee died due to ovarian cancer in Petaling Jaya, Selangor, on 21 March 2024. She was 58. A by-election was held after her death in office on 11 May 2024. Pang Sock Tao of PH was elected as her successor as the Kuala Kubu Baharu MLA by a majority of 3,869 votes in the election.

== Election results ==
Malacca State Legislative Assembly
Year	Constituency	Candidate	Votes	Pct	Opponent(s)	Votes	Pct	Ballots cast	Majority	Turnout
1995	N19 Duyong	Lee Kee Hiong (DAP)	3,439	36.01%	Gan Boon Leong (MCA)	5,119	53.60%	9,738	1,680	77.94%
1995	N19 Duyong	Lee Kee Hiong (DAP)	3,439	36.01%	Mohd Ali Mohd Sharif (PAS)	993	10.40%	9,738	1,680	77.94%

Selangor State Legislative Assembly
Year	Constituency	Candidate	Votes	Pct	Opponent(s)	Votes	Pct	Ballots cast	Majority	Turnout
2013	N06 Kuala Kubu Baharu	Lee Kee Hiong (DAP)	9,469	53.46%	Ooi Hui Wen (MCA)	7,767	43.85%	18,165	1,702	85.74%
2013	N06 Kuala Kubu Baharu	Lee Kee Hiong (DAP)	9,469	53.46%	Yoong Tham Fook (IND)	250	1.41%	18,165	1,702	85.74%
2013	N06 Kuala Kubu Baharu	Lee Kee Hiong (DAP)	9,469	53.46%	Pritpal Singh Mender Singh (IND)	117	0.66%	18,165	1,702	85.74%
2013	N06 Kuala Kubu Baharu	Lee Kee Hiong (DAP)	9,469	53.46%	Nadarajah Supramaniam (IND)	108	0.61%	18,165	1,702	85.74%
2018	N06 Kuala Kubu Baharu	Lee Kee Hiong (DAP)	14,101	57.85%	Wong Koon Mun (MCA)	6,967	28.59%	24,746	7,134	84.94%
2018	N06 Kuala Kubu Baharu	Lee Kee Hiong (DAP)	14,101	57.85%	Naharudin Abdul Rashid (PAS)	3,306	13.56%	24,746	7,134	84.94%
2023	N06 Kuala Kubu Baharu	Lee Kee Hiong (DAP)	14,862	54.40%	Henry Teoh Kien Hong (Gerakan)	10,743	39.33%	27,662	4,119	69.13%
2023	N06 Kuala Kubu Baharu	Lee Kee Hiong (DAP)	14,862	54.40%	Sivaprakash Ramasamy (MUDA)	1,186	4.34%	27,662	4,119	69.13%
2023	N06 Kuala Kubu Baharu	Lee Kee Hiong (DAP)	14,862	54.40%	Chng Boon Lai (PRM)	527	1.90%	27,662	4,119	69.13%
