= Taman Medan (state constituency) =

Political subdivision in Selangor, Malaysia

Taman Medan (N33)
Selangor constituency

State constituency
- Legislature: Selangor State Legislative Assembly
MLA
Afif Bahardin
PN
- Constituency created: 1994
- First contested: 1995
- Last contested: 2023

Demographics
- Electors (2023): 61,959

Taman Medan is a state constituency in Selangor, Malaysia, that has been represented in the Selangor State Legislative Assembly since 1995. It has been represented by Afif Bahardin of Perikatan Nasional (PN) since 2023.

The state constituency was created in the 1994 redistribution and is mandated to return a single member to the Selangor State Legislative Assembly under the first past the post voting system.

== Demographics ==
Ethnic breakdown of Taman Medan's electorate as of 2023
1. Malay (45.0%)
2. Indian (39.9%)
3. Chinese (12.0%)
4. Other ethnicities (3.07%)

== History ==
=== Polling districts ===
According to the federal gazette issued on 30 March 2018, the Taman Medan constituency is divided into 16 polling districts.

State constituency	Polling Districts	Code	Location
Taman Medan (N33）	Seksyen 51	105/33/01	SJK (T) Vivekananda Petaling Jaya Taman Templer
Taman Medan (N33）	Seksyen 4 Petaling Jaya	105/33/02	SK Jalan Selangor (1); SK Jalan Selangor (2)
Taman Medan (N33）	Kawasan Melayu	105/33/03	SK Petaling Jaya
Taman Medan (N33）	PJS 1	105/33/04	SJK (C) Yuk Chyun
Taman Medan (N33）	Medan Pejasa	105/33/05	Dewan Masyarakat Taman Sri Manja
Taman Medan (N33）	Taman Dato Harun 1	105/33/06	SRA Taman Datuk Harun
Taman Medan (N33）	Taman Dato Harun 2	105/33/07	SK Taman Dato' Harun (1)
Taman Medan (N33）	PJS 3	105/33/08	Dewan Seberguna Jalan Medan 12
Taman Medan (N33）	PJS 4	105/33/09	SRA Kampung Medan 2
Taman Medan (N33）	Baiduri	105/33/10	SRA Kampung Baiduri
Taman Medan (N33）	Petaling Utama	105/33/11	KAFA Integrasi Kampung Pinang Tunggal
Taman Medan (N33）	PJS 2	105/33/12	SK Taman Medan
Taman Medan (N33）	PJS 2c/12	105/33/13	SMK Taman Dato' Harun
Taman Medan (N33）	PJS 2d	105/33/14	Balai Raya PJS 2d/11 Taman Medan
Taman Medan (N33）	Kampung Medan	105/33/15	SRA Medan Harun
Taman Medan (N33）	PJS 2c	105/33/16	Dewan Seberguna PJS 2c/6

=== Representation history ===
Members of the Legislative Assembly for Taman Medan
Assembly	No	Years	Member	Party
Constituency created from Lindongan, Bukit Gasing and Taman Aman
9th	N28	1995-1999	Zahar Hashim	BN (UMNO)
10th	N28	1999-2004	Norkhaila Jamaluddin	BN (UMNO)
11th	N33	2004-2008	Ab Wahab Ibrahim	BN (UMNO)
12th	N33	2008-2013	Haniza Mohamed Talha	PR (PKR)
13th	N33	2013-2018	Haniza Mohamed Talha	PR (PKR)
14th	N33	2018-2023	Syamsul Firdaus Mohamed Supri	PH (PKR)
15th	N33	2023–present	Afif Bahardin	PN (BERSATU)

== Election results ==
Selangor state election, 2023
Party	Candidate	Votes	%	∆%
PN	Afif Bahardin	22,316	50.03	▲50.03
PH	Ahmad Akhir Pakwan Chik	22,286	49.97	▼7.81
Total valid votes		44,602	100.00	
Total rejected ballots		301		
Unreturned ballots		43		
Turnout		44,946	72.54	▼12.58
Registered electors		61,959		
Majority		30	0.07	▼29.05
PN gain from PKR		Swing		?

Selangor state election, 2018
Party	Candidate	Votes	%	∆%
PKR	Syamsul Firdaus Mohamed Supri	21,712	57.78	▲57.78
BN	Abdul Mutalif Abdul Rahim	10,772	28.67	▼15.97
PAS	Ariffin Mahaiyuddin	5,090	13.55	▲13.55
Total valid votes		37,574	100.00	
Total rejected ballots		390		
Unreturned ballots		113		
Turnout		38,077	85.12	▲0.40
Registered electors		44,731		
Majority		10,940	29.12	▲19.17
PKR hold		Swing		

Selangor state election, 2013
Party	Candidate	Votes	%	∆%
PKR	Haniza Mohamed Talha	20,478	54.59	▼3.01
BN	Ab Wahab Ibrahim	16,747	44.64	▲2.44
Independent	Kamarul Jaman Seeni Mohideen	213	0.57	▲0.57
KITA	Johan Asik	55	0.15	▲0.15
Independent	Muhammad Zarqasyi Zulkarnain	21	0.06	▲0.06
Total valid votes		37,514	100.00	
Total rejected ballots		494		
Unreturned ballots		93		
Turnout		38,101	84.72	▲10.61
Registered electors		44,974		
Majority		3,731	9.95	▼5.25
PKR hold		Swing		
Source(s) "Federal Government Gazette - Notice of Contested Election, State Legislative Assembly for the State of Selangor [P.U. (B) 192/2013]" (PDF). Attorney General's Chambers of Malaysia. 26 April 2013. Archived from the original (PDF) on 2019-12-29. "Federal Government Gazette - Results of Contested Election and Statements of the Poll after the Official Addition of Votes, State Constituencies for the State of Selangor [P.U. (B) 233/2013]". Attorney General's Chambers of Malaysia. 22 May 2013. Archived from the original (PDF) on 2018-10-02.

Selangor state election, 2008
Party	Candidate	Votes	%	∆%
PKR	Haniza Mohamed Talha	16,803	57.60	▲45.31
BN	Munaliza Hamzah	12,370	42.40	▼25.51
Total valid votes		29,173	100.00	
Total rejected ballots		440		
Unreturned ballots		39		
Turnout		29,652	74.11	▲3.64
Registered electors		40,009		
Majority		4,433	15.20	▼35.30
PKR gain from BN		Swing		?

Selangor state election, 2004
Party	Candidate	Votes	%	∆%
BN	Ab Wahab Ibrahim	18,191	67.91	▲11.23
PAS	Ghazali Shaari	4,663	17.41	▼25.91
PKR	Wan M. Razali Wan A. Kadir	3,292	12.29	▲12.29
Independent	Kamarul Jaman Seeni Mohideen	641	2.39	▲2.39
Total valid votes		26,787	100.00	
Total rejected ballots		612		
Unreturned ballots		20		
Turnout		27,419	70.47	▼0.50
Registered electors		38,910		
Majority		13,528	50.50	▲37.14
BN hold		Swing		

Selangor state election, 1999
Party	Candidate	Votes	%	∆%
BN	Norkhaila Jamaluddin	13,258	56.68	▼24.53
PAS	Supian Md Nordin	10,135	43.32	▲43.32
Total valid votes		23,393	100.00	
Total rejected ballots		367		
Unreturned ballots		13		
Turnout		23,773	70.97	▼3.87
Registered electors		33,498		
Majority		3,123	13.36	▼49.06
BN hold		Swing		

Selangor state election, 1995
Party	Candidate	Votes	%
BN	Zahar Hashim	17,504	81.21
S46	Zahari Abd Hamid	4,050	18.79
Total valid votes		21,554	100.00
Total rejected ballots		442	
Unreturned ballots		73	
Turnout		22,069	67.10
Registered electors		32,892	
Majority		13,454	62.42
This was a new constituency created.
