= Hulu Bernam (state constituency) =

Electoral district in Selangor, Malaysia

Hulu Bernam (N05)
Selangor constituency

State constituency
- Legislature: Selangor State Legislative Assembly
MLA
Mui'zzuddeen Mahyuddin
PN
- Constituency created: 1958
- First contested: 1959
- Last contested: 2023

Demographics
- Electors (2023): 30,367

Hulu Bernam is a state constituency in Selangor, Malaysia, that has been represented in the Selangor State Legislative Assembly since 1959. It has been represented by Mui'zzuddeen Mahyuddin of Perikatan Nasional (PN) since 2023.

The state constituency was created in the 1958 redistribution and is mandated to return a single member to the Selangor State Legislative Assembly under the first past the post voting system.

== Demographics ==
Ethnic breakdown of Hulu Bernam's electorate as of 2023
1. Malay (70.0%)
2. Chinese (14.8%)
3. Indian (13.1%)
4. Other ethnicities (2.07%)

== History ==
=== Polling districts ===
According to the federal gazette issued on 30 March 2018, the Hulu Bernam constituency is divided into 15 polling districts.

State constituency	Polling Districts	Code	Location
Hulu Bernam (N05）	Kawasan S.K.C	094/05/01	SK Sri Keledang
Hulu Bernam (N05）	Ladang Lima Belas	094/05/02	SJK (T) Ladang Lima Belas Hulu Selangor
Hulu Bernam (N05）	Gedangsa	094/05/03	SMK Gedangsa
Hulu Bernam (N05）	Sungai Selisik	094/05/04	SK Sungai Selisik
Hulu Bernam (N05）	Kampung Gesir	094/05/05	SK Gesir Tengah
Hulu Bernam (N05）	Kampung Sungai Dusun	094/05/06	SK Kampung Soeharto
Hulu Bernam (N05）	Kampung Desa Maju	094/05/07	SK Sungai Tengi
Hulu Bernam (N05）	Kampung Sungai Tengi Selatan	094/05/08	SK Seri Fajar FELDA Sungai Tengi Selatan
Hulu Bernam (N05）	Changkat Asa	094/05/09	SJK (T) Ladang Changkat Asa
Hulu Bernam (N05）	Kampung Hulu Bernam	094/05/10	SRA Hulu Bernam
Hulu Bernam (N05）	Ladang Escot	094/05/11	SK Hulu Bernam
Hulu Bernam (N05）	Kampung Gumut	094/05/12	SRA Kalumpang
Hulu Bernam (N05）	Bandar Kalumpang	094/06/13	SMK Kalumpang
Hulu Bernam (N05）	Kampung Baharu Kalumpang	094/05/14	SJK (C) Kalumpang
Hulu Bernam (N05）	Kuala Kalumpang	094/05/15	SK Kalumpang

=== Representation history ===
Members of the Legislative Assembly for Hulu Bernam
Assembly	No	Years	Member	Party
Constituency created
Ulu Bernam
1st	N27	1959-1964	Noor Yusof	Alliance (UMNO)
2nd	N27	1964-1969	Shoib Ahmad	Alliance (UMNO)
		1969-1971	Assembly dissolved	
3rd	N27	1971-1973	Shoib Ahmad	Alliance (UMNO)
3rd	N27	1973-1974	Shoib Ahmad	BN (UMNO)
Constituency abolished, split into Kalumpang and Kuala Kubu Bharu
Constituency re-created from Kalumpang
Hulu Bernam
9th	N07	1995-1999	Zainal Abidin Sakom	BN (UMNO)
10th	N07	1999-2004	Mohamed Idris Abu Bakar	BN (UMNO)
11th	N05	2004-2008	Mohamed Idris Abu Bakar	BN (UMNO)
12th	N05	2008-2013	Mohamed Idris Abu Bakar	BN (UMNO)
13th	N05	2013-2018	Rosni Sohar	BN (UMNO)
14th	N05	2018–2023	Rosni Sohar	BN (UMNO)
15th	N05	2023–present	Mui'zzuddeen Mahyuddin	PN (PAS)

== Election results ==
Selangor state election, 2023
Party	Candidate	Votes	%	∆%
PN	Mui'zzuddeen Mahyuddin	10,718	51.61	▲51.61
PH	Mohd Amran Mohd Sakir	10,049	48.39	▲6.21
Total valid votes		20,767	100.00	
Total rejected ballots		194		
Unreturned ballots		22		
Turnout		20,983	69.10	▼15.09
Registered electors		30,367		
Majority		669	3.22	▲3.11
PN gain from BN		Swing		?

Selangor state election, 2018
Party	Candidate	Votes	%	∆%
BN	Rosni Sohar	8,164	43.28	▼15.26
PKR	Mohd Amran Mohd Sakir	8,144	43.18	▲43.18
PAS	Mohammed Salleh Ri	2,554	13.54	▼27.92
Total valid votes		18,862	100.00	
Total rejected ballots		323		
Unreturned ballots		58		
Turnout		19,243	84.19	▼2.39
Registered electors		22,857		
Majority		20	0.11	▼16.97
BN hold		Swing		

Selangor state election, 2013
Party	Candidate	Votes	%	∆%
BN	Rosni Sohar	10,397	58.54	▼5.75
PAS	Muhamad Idris Ahmad	7,365	41.46	▲5.75
Total valid votes		17,762	100.00	
Total rejected ballots		261		
Unreturned ballots		26		
Turnout		18,124	86.58	▲12.89
Registered electors		20,933		
Majority		3,032	17.08	▼11.50
BN hold		Swing		
Source(s) "Federal Government Gazette - Notice of Contested Election, State Legislative Assembly for the State of Selangor [P.U. (B) 192/2013]" (PDF). Attorney General's Chambers of Malaysia. 26 April 2013. Archived from the original (PDF) on 2019-12-29. "Federal Government Gazette - Results of Contested Election and Statements of the Poll after the Official Addition of Votes, State Constituencies for the State of Selangor [P.U. (B) 233/2013]" (PDF). Attorney General's Chambers of Malaysia. 22 May 2013. Archived from the original (PDF) on 2018-10-02.

Selangor state election, 2008
Party	Candidate	Votes	%	∆%
BN	Mohamed Idris Abu Bakar	7,985	64.29	▼13.06
PAS	Abdul Sukor Ali	4,436	35.71	▲13.06
Total valid votes		12,421	100.00	
Total rejected ballots		318		
Unreturned ballots		193		
Turnout		12,932	73.69	▲3.31
Registered electors		17,549		
Majority		3,549	28.58	▼26.12
BN hold		Swing		

Selangor state election, 2004
Party	Candidate	Votes	%	∆%
BN	Mohamed Idris Abu Bakar	9,264	77.35	▲8.39
PAS	Abdul Sukor Ali	2,713	22.65	▼8.39
Total valid votes		11,977	100.00	
Total rejected ballots		310		
Unreturned ballots		16		
Turnout		12,303	70.38	▲0.82
Registered electors		17,482		
Majority		6,551	54.70	▲16.78
BN hold		Swing		

Selangor state election, 1999
Party	Candidate	Votes	%	∆%
BN	Mohamed Idris Abu Bakar	7,856	68.96	▼23.82
PAS	Mazalan Hussin	3,536	31.04	▲23.82
Total valid votes		11,392	100.00	
Total rejected ballots		417		
Unreturned ballots		20		
Turnout		11,829	69.56	▲0.84
Registered electors		17,006		
Majority		4,320	37.92	▼47.64
BN hold		Swing		

Selangor state election, 1995
Party	Candidate	Votes	%	∆%
BN	Zainal Abidin Sakom	10,579	92.78	▲33.43
PAS	Abdul Majid Hasan	823	7.22	▲7.22
Total valid votes		11,402	100.00	
Total rejected ballots		351		
Unreturned ballots		3		
Turnout		11,756	68.72	
Registered electors		17,106		
Majority		9,756	85.56	
BN gain from Alliance		Swing		?

Selangor state election, 1969: Ulu Bernam
Party	Candidate	Votes	%	∆%
Alliance	Shoib Ahmad	4,569	59.35	▼12.16
DAP	Lamsah Azhari	3,130	40.65	▲40.65
Total valid votes		7,699	100.00	
Total rejected ballots		666		
Unreturned ballots		0		
Turnout		8,365	74.64	▼3.73
Registered electors		11,207		
Majority		1,439	18.70	▼24.32
Alliance hold		Swing		

Selangor state election, 1964: Ulu Bernam
Party	Candidate	Votes	%	∆%
Alliance	Shoib Ahmad	4,753	71.51	▲5.61
Socialist Front	Mohamed Nazar Nong	1,894	28.49	▼5.61
Total valid votes		6,647	100.00	
Total rejected ballots		483		
Unreturned ballots		0		
Turnout		7,130	78.37	▲0.03
Registered electors		9,098		
Majority		2,859	43.02	▲11.22
Alliance hold		Swing		

Selangor state election, 1959: Ulu Bernam
Party	Candidate	Votes	%
Alliance	Noor Yusof	3,392	65.90
Socialist Front	Abdullah Zainal	1,755	34.10
Total valid votes		5,147	100.00
Total rejected ballots		196	
Unreturned ballots		0	
Turnout		5,343	78.34
Registered electors		6,820	
Majority		1,637	31.80
This was a new constituency created.
