= Pang Sock Tao =

Malaysian politician, host, broadcaster, producer and debater

Yang Berhormat Puan Pang Sock Tao MLA
- 彭小桃

Assistant State Publicity Secretary of the Democratic Action Party of Selangor
- Incumbent
- Assumed office 12 December 2024
- Publicity Secretary: Wong Siew Ki
- Secretary-General: Anthony Loke Siew Fook
- State Chairman: Ng Sze Han
- Preceded by: Teh Hoong Keat

Assistant Youth Publicity Secretary of the Democratic Action Party
- Incumbent
- Assumed office 17 November 2024 Serving with Nursyaheera Abdul Ghafar
- Publicity Secretary: Ho Chi Yang
- Secretary-General: Anthony Loke Siew Fook
- Youth Chief: Woo Kah Leong

Member of the Selangor State Legislative Assembly for Kuala Kubu Baharu
- Incumbent
- Assumed office 11 May 2024
- Preceded by: Lee Kee Hiong (PH–DAP)
- Majority: 3,869 (2024)

Personal details
- Born: Pang Sock Tao; 26 April 1993 (age 33) Ampang, Selangor, Malaysia
- Party: Democratic Action Party (DAP) (since 2017)
- Other political affiliations: Pakatan Harapan (PH) (since 2017)
- Spouse: Yap Bing Yew (m. 2022)
- Relatives: Pang Sock Fong (elder sister); Pang Sock Ying (elder twin sister)
- Education: On Pong Chinese National Type School; Chung Hua Secondary School; Universiti Tenaga Nasional (BEng)
- Occupation: Politician

Pang Sock Tao

Chinese name
- Traditional Chinese: 彭小桃
- Simplified Chinese: 彭小桃
Transcriptions
Standard Mandarin
- Hanyu Pinyin: Péng Xiǎotáo

Pang Sock Tao (Chinese: 彭小桃; pinyin: Péng Xiǎotáo; born 26 April 1993) is a Malaysian politician who has served as Member of the Selangor State Legislative Assembly (MLA) for Kuala Kubu Baharu since May 2024. She is a member of the Democratic Action Party (DAP), a component party of the Pakatan Harapan (PH) coalition. She has served as the Assistant State Publicity Secretary of DAP of Selangor since December 2024 and Assistant Youth Publicity Secretary of DAP since November 2024. She is also the Press Secretary and was Special Affairs Officer to Minister of Housing and Local Government Nga Kor Ming and was also Special Affairs Officer to former Minister of Energy, Science, Technology, Environment and Climate Change Yeo Bee Yin.

== Early life and education ==
Pang was born in Ampang, Selangor, Malaysia on 26 April 1993. She attended On Pong Chinese National Type School, Ampang, Hulu Langat, Selangor and Chung Hua Secondary School, Port Dickson, Negeri Sembilan for her primary and secondary education respectively. She graduated from the Universiti Tenaga Nasional (UNITEN) after completing her tertiary education.

== Political career ==
Pang joined DAP in 2017. She actively campaigned for her party in the 2018 general election by attending many trails, becoming one of the most popular guests in those events. After PH took power following the 2018 general election, Yeo was named as a Cabinet minister and Pang was made her special affairs officer. After PH returned to power as a result of the 2022 general election, Nga was appointed as a Cabinet minister as well and Pang was given the role of his special affairs officer and later promoted to press secretary.

Besides serving under ministers, Pang served as a host on the social media platforms of the newspaper of her party, the 'Roketkini', increasing her popularity and was given a title of the 'Goddess of Ubah', referring her to as a pretty host on 'UbahTV', the media of her party. In 2022, she became a broadcaster and producer of 'UbahTV' and has since hosted the livestream programme 'Secretary-General Goes Online', which features Anthony Loke Siew Fook, the Secretary-General of DAP. In addition, Pang is also a debater, having won the 15th National Varsity Chinese Debating Championship as well as the 1st UCSI University Chinese Debate Tournament in 2018.

== Member of the Selangor State Legislative Assembly (since 2024) ==
In the 2024 Kuala Kubu Baharu by-election, Pang made her electoral debut after being nominated by PH to contest for the Kuala Kubu Baharu state seat. Pang won the seat and was elected to the Selangor State Legislative Assembly as the Kuala Kubu Baharu MLA after defeating Khairul Azhari Saut of Perikatan Nasional (PN) who is also the Acting Division Chief of Hulu Selangor of the Malaysian United Indigenous Party (BERSATU), independent candidate and businesswoman Eris Nyau Ke Xin and Hafizah Zainuddin of Parti Rakyat Malaysia (PRM) by a majority of 3,869 votes. When the Selangor State Legislative Assembly meeting convened on 4 July 2024, Pang was officially sworn in as the Kuala Kubu Baharu MLA.

== Personal life ==
Pang married lawyer and fellow debater Yap Bing Yew in 2022. Her elder sister Pang Sock Fong is also a politician who previously served as Member of the Ampang Jaya Municipal Council (MPAJ) and is presently the Vice Women Chief of Ampang of the People's Justice Party (PKR), another component party of the PH coalition. She also has a twin elder sister Pang Sock Ying.

== Election results ==
Selangor State Legislative Assembly
Year	Constituency	Candidate	Votes	Pct	Opponent(s)	Votes	Pct	Ballots cast	Majority	Turnout
2024	N06 Kuala Kubu Baharu	Pang Sock Tao (DAP)	14,000	57.21%	Khairul Azhari Saut (BERSATU)	10,131	41.40%	24,745	3,869	61.51%
2024	N06 Kuala Kubu Baharu	Pang Sock Tao (DAP)	14,000	57.21%	Eris Nyau Ke Xin (IND)	188	0.77%	24,745	3,869	61.51%
2024	N06 Kuala Kubu Baharu	Pang Sock Tao (DAP)	14,000	57.21%	Hafizah Zainuddin (PRM)	152	0.62%	24,745	3,869	61.51%
