= June Leow =

Malaysian politician

June Leow Hsiad Hui
- 廖书慧

Member of the Malaysian Parliament for Hulu Selangor
- In office 9 May 2018 – 19 November 2022
- Preceded by: P. Kamalanathan (BN–MIC)
- Succeeded by: Mohd Hasnizan Harun (PN–PAS)
- Majority: 13,391 (2018)

Faction represented in Dewan Rakyat
- 2018–2022: Pakatan Harapan

Personal details
- Born: June Leow Hsiad Hui; 5 June 1964 (age 62)
- Citizenship: Malaysian
- Party: People's Justice Party (PKR)
- Other political affiliations: Pakatan Harapan (PH)
- Spouse: Lim Hang Kiau (林汉侨) (died 2024)
- Children: 3
- Occupation: Politician
- June Leow on Parliament of Malaysia

June Leow Hsiad Hui (simplified Chinese: 廖书慧; traditional Chinese: 廖書慧; pinyin: Liào Shūhuì; Jyutping: Liu6 Syu1 Wai6; Pe̍h-ōe-jī: Liāu Su-hūi, born 5 June 1964) is a Malaysian politician who served as the Member of Parliament (MP) for Hulu Selangor from May 2018 to November 2022. She was also a member of the Hulu Selangor District Council (MDHS). She is a member of the People's Justice Party (PKR), a component party of the Pakatan Harapan (PH) coalition.

== Election results ==
Parliament of Malaysia
| Year | Constituency | Candidate | Votes | Pct | Opponent(s) | Votes | Pct | Ballots cast | Majority | Turnout |
|---|---|---|---|---|---|---|---|---|---|---|
| 2018 | P094 Hulu Selangor | June Leow Hsiad Hui (PKR) | 40,783 | 47.86% | Kamalanathan Panchanathan (MIC) | 27,392 | 32.14% | 86,798 | 13,391 | 85.95% |
| 2018 | P094 Hulu Selangor | June Leow Hsiad Hui (PKR) | 40,783 | 47.86% | Wan Mat Sulaiman (PAS) | 16,620 | 19.50% | 86,798 | 13,391 | 85.95% |
| 2018 | P094 Hulu Selangor | June Leow Hsiad Hui (PKR) | 40,783 | 47.86% | Kumar Paramasivam (IND) | 426 | 0.50% | 86,798 | 13,391 | 85.95% |
