= 2024 Kuala Kubu Baharu by-election =

2024 by-election in Selangor, Malaysia

- 11 May 2024

N06 Kuala Kubu Baharu seat in the Selangor State Legislative Assembly
	First party	Second party
	PH	PN
Candidate	Pang Sock Tao	Khairul Azhari Saut
Party	DAP	BERSATU
Alliance	PH	PN
Popular vote	14,000	10,131
Percentage	57.21%	41.40%
Kuala Kubu Baharu assemblywoman before election
Lee Kee Hiong (died)
Pakatan Harapan (DAP)
Elected Kuala Kubu Baharu assemblywoman
Pang Sock Tao
Pakatan Harapan (DAP)

The 2024 Kuala Kubu Baharu by-election was a by-election for the Selangor State Legislative Assembly seat of Kuala Kubu Baharu that was held on 11 May 2024. It was called following the death of incumbent, Lee Kee Hiong on 21 March 2024 of cancer. Lee had served as Member of the Selangor State Legislative Assembly for Kuala Kubu Baharu, serving since 2013 for three terms. It was the first Selangor state by-election since the 2023 Selangor state election. The last time Selangor had a by-election was during the 2019 Semenyih by-election.

Pang Sock Tao of Pakatan Harapan (PH) won the by-election after defeating Khairul Azhari Saut of Perikatan Nasional (PN), independent candidate Eris Nyau Ke Xin and Hafizah Zainuddin of Parti Rakyat Malaysia (PRM) by a majority of 3,869 votes.

== Events ==
On 7 April 2024, State Secretary of PH of Selangor Mohd Khairuddin Othman announced the appointment of Member of the Selangor State Executive Council (EXCO), MLA for Kinrara and State Secretary of DAP of Selangor Ng Sze Han as Election Director of the by-election. Mohd Khairuddin also said that he himself, alongside Member of Parliament (MP) for Puchong Yeo Bee Yin and MP for Shah Alam Azli Yusof would assist Ng in his role. Mohd Khairuddin also added that Selangor PH would draw up, prepare and coordinate the work and tasks of the campaign with the central committee of PH and parties of the Selangor coalition state government.

On 10 April 2024, Deputy Chairman of Perikatan Nasional (PN) and Deputy President of the Malaysian United Indigenous Party (BERSATU) Ahmad Faizal Azumu revealed that PN had identified the candidate representing the coalition and would soon officially announce the name. He then acknowledged that the coalition was contesting and fighting in the by-election as an underdog but declared confidence in garnering support of the Malays while also significantly attracting the votes of the Indian and Orang Asli voters in the Malay-majority Kuala Kubu Baharu. He also dismissed concerns about which PN component party would the candidate be of, be it BERSATU, Malaysian Islamic Party (PAS) or Parti Gerakan Rakyat Malaysia (GERAKAN), stressing that the candidate would be the one who represents the PN coalition instead of any of the parties.

The by-election was supposed to be maiden electoral participation of Parti Orang Asli Malaysia (ASLI), but its candidate failed to file its nomination on Nomination Day citing "technical issues".

== Timeline ==
The key dates are listed below.

Date	Event
4 April 2024	Issue of the Writ of Election
27 April 2024	Nomination Day
28 April – 10 May 2024	Campaigning Period
7 – 10 May 2024	Early polling day for postal and overseas voters
11 May 2024	Polling Day

== Results ==
Selangor state by-election, 11 May 2024: Kuala Kubu Baharu Upon the death of incumbent, Lee Kee Hiong
Party	Candidate	Votes	%	∆%
PH	Pang Sock Tao	14,000	57.21	▲2.81
PN	Khairul Azhari Saut	10,131	41.40	▲2.07
Independent	Eris Nyau Ke Xin	188	0.77	▲0.77
Parti Rakyat Malaysia	Hafizah Zainuddin	152	0.62	▼1.28
Total valid votes		24,471	100.00	
Total rejected ballots		263		
Unreturned ballots		11		
Turnout		24,745	61.51	▼7.74
Registered electors		40,226		
Majority		3,869	15.80	▲0.73
PH hold		Swing		

== Previous results ==
Selangor state election, 2023: Kuala Kubu Baharu
Party	Candidate	Votes	%	∆%
PH	Lee Kee Hiong	14,862	54.40	▼3.45
PN	Teoh Kien Hong	10,743	39.33	▲39.33
MUDA	Sivaprakash Ramasamy	1,186	4.34	▲4.34
Parti Rakyat Malaysia	Ch'ng Boon Lai	527	1.90	▲1.90
Total valid votes		27,318	100.00	
Total rejected ballots		364		
Unreturned ballots		27		
Turnout		27,709	69.25	▼15.69
Registered electors		40,015		
Majority		4,119	15.07	▼14.19
PH hold		Swing		
