= Muhammad Muhaimin Harith Abdullah Sani =

Malaysian politician

Yang Berhormat Tuan Muhammad Muhaimin Harith Abdullah Sani MLA
- مُحَمَّد مُهَيْمِن حَارِث عَبْدُٱلله ثَانِي
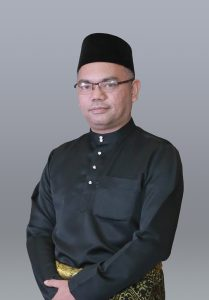

Member of the Selangor State Legislative Assembly for Batang Kali
- Incumbent
- Assumed office 12 August 2023
- Preceded by: Harumaini Omar (PH–BERSATU)
- Majority: 2,978 (2023)

Personal details
- Born: Muhammad Muhaimin Harith bin Abdullah Sani
- Citizenship: Malaysian
- Party: Malaysian United Indigenous Party (BERSATU)
- Other political affiliations: Perikatan Nasional (PN)
- Occupation: Politician

Muhammad Muhaimin Harith bin Abdullah Sani is a Malaysian politician who has served as Member of the Selangor State Legislative Assembly (MLA) for Batang Kali since August 2023. He is a member of the Malaysian United Indigenous Party (BERSATU), a component party of the Perikatan Nasional (PN) coalition.

== Political career ==
=== Member of the Selangor State Legislative Assembly (since 2023) ===
==== 2023 Selangor state election ====
In the 2023 Selangor state election, Muhammad Muhaimin Harith made his electoral debut after being nominated by PN to contest the Hulu Bernam state seat. Muhammad Muhaimin Harith won the seat and was elected to the Selangor State Legislative Assembly as the Batang Kali MLA for the first term after defeating Mohd Isa Abu Kasim of Barisan Nasional (BN) by a majority of 2,978 votes.

== Election results ==
Selangor State Legislative Assembly
Year	Constituency	Candidate	Votes	Pct	Opponent(s)	Votes	Pct	Ballots cast	Majority	Turnout
2023	N07 Batang Kali	Muhammad Muhaimin Harith Abdullah Sani (BERSATU)	32,285	52.42%	Mohd Isa Abu Kasim (UMNO)	29,307	47.58%	61,592	2,978	71.38%
