= Batang Kali (state constituency) =

State constituency in Selangor, Malaysia

Batang Kali (N07)
Selangor constituency

State constituency
- Legislature: Selangor State Legislative Assembly
MLA
Muhammad Muhaimin Harith Abdullah Sani
PN
- Constituency created: 1974
- First contested: 1974
- Last contested: 2023

Demographics
- Electors (2023): 86,282

Batang Kali is a state constituency in Selangor, Malaysia, that has been represented in the Selangor State Legislative Assembly since 1974. It has been represented by Muhammad Muhaimin Harith Abdullah Sani of Perikatan Nasional (PN) since 2023.

The state constituency was created in the 1974 redistribution. It returns a single member to the Selangor State Legislative Assembly under the first past the post voting system.

== Demographics ==
Ethnic breakdown of Batang Kali's electorate as of 2023
1. Malay (68.9%)
2. Indian (14.1%)
3. Chinese (12.8%)
4. Other ethnicities (4.17%)

== History ==
=== Polling districts ===
According to the federal gazette issued on 30 March 2018, the Batang Kali constituency is divided into 19 polling districts.

State constituency	Polling Districts	Code	Location
Batang Kali（N07）	Bukit Rasa	094/07/01	SK Rasa
Batang Kali（N07）	Batang Kali	094/07/02	SK Batang Kali
Batang Kali（N07）	Hulu Kali	094/07/03	SMK Bandar Baru Batang Kali
Batang Kali（N07）	Kampung Padang	094/07/04	SRA Hulu Yam Baharu
Batang Kali（N07）	Hulu Yam Baru 1	094/07/05	SK Ulu Yam Bharu
Batang Kali（N07）	Hulu Yam Baru 2	094/07/06	SJK (C) Kampung Gurney Hulu Yam Baharu
Batang Kali（N07）	Serendah	094/07/07	SRA Serendah
Batang Kali（N07）	Sungai Choh	094/07/08	SK Sungai Choh
Batang Kali（N07）	Sungai Gapi	094/07/09	SK Antara Gapi
Batang Kali（N07）	Taman Bukit Teratai	094/07/10	SJK (T) Sungai Choh Taman Bukit Teratai
Batang Kali（N07）	Sungai Buaya	094/07/11	SK Sungai Buaya
Batang Kali（N07）	Bukit Beruntung	094/07/12	SK Bukit Beruntung
Batang Kali（N07）	Bandar Sungai Buaya	094/07/13	SMK Bandar Sungai Buaya
Batang Kali（N07）	Bukit Sentosa 1 Hingga 5	094/07/14	SMK Bukit Sentosa
Batang Kali（N07）	Bukit Sentosa 6 Hingga 12	094/07/15	SK Bukit Sentosa
Batang Kali（N07）	Taman Bunga Raya	094/07/16	SRA Taman Bunga Raya
Batang Kali（N07）	Kampung Baharu Serendah	094/07/17	SJK (C) Serendah
Batang Kali（N07）	Taman Bunga Raya 2	094/07/18	SK Taman Bunga Raya (1)
Batang Kali（N07）	Seri Serendah	094/07/19	SK Serendah

=== Representation history ===
Members of the Legislative Assembly for Batang Kali
Assembly	No	Years	Member	Party
Constituency created from Kuala Kubu and Serendah
4th	N09	1974-1978	Rosedin Yaacob	BN (UMNO)
5th	N09	1978–1982	Rosedin Yaacob	BN (UMNO)
6th	N09	1982-1986	Muhammad Muhammad Taib	BN (UMNO)
7th	N09	1986–1990	Muhammad Muhammad Taib	BN (UMNO)
8th	N09	1990–1995	Muhammad Muhammad Taib	BN (UMNO)
9th	N09	1995–1999	Muhammad Muhammad Taib	BN (UMNO)
10th	N09	1999-2004	Zainal Abidin Sakom	BN (UMNO)
11th	N07	2004–2008	Zainal Abidin Sakom	BN (UMNO)
12th	N07	2008-2013	Mohd Isa Abu Kasim	BN (UMNO)
13th	N07	2013-2018	Mat Nadzari Ahmad Dahlan	BN (UMNO)
14th	N07	2018-2020	Harumaini Omar	PH (BERSATU)
14th	N07	2020–2023	Harumaini Omar	PEJUANG
14th	N07	2023	Vacant (Note: Vacant from 16 February 2023 until the 2023 Selangor state election due to the incumbent was vacated from his seat in an announcement by the Selangor State Assembly Speaker due to prolonged absenteeism without notice from the Assembly sitting since 28 July 2022.)	
15th	N07	2023–present	Muhammad Muhaimin Harith Abdullah Sani	PN (BERSATU)

== Election results ==
Selangor state election, 2023
Party	Candidate	Votes	%	∆%
PN	Muhammad Muhaimin Harith Abdullah Sani	32,285	52.11	▲52.11
BN	Mohd Isa Abu Kasim	29,307	47.89	▲16.54
Total valid votes		61,592	100.00	
Total rejected ballots		348		
Unreturned ballots		59		
Turnout		61,999	71.86	▼15.60
Registered electors		86,282		
Majority		2,978	4.22	▼15.51
PN gain from PKR		Swing		?

Selangor state election, 2018
Party	Candidate	Votes	%	∆%
PKR	Harumaini Omar	21,536	51.08	▲9.73
BN	Mat Nadzari Ahmad Dahlan	13,221	31.35	▼24.13
PAS	Mohd Hasnizan Harun	7,408	17.57	▲17.57
Total valid votes		42,165	100.00	
Total rejected ballots		492		
Unreturned ballots		200		
Turnout		42,857	87.46	▲9.59
Registered electors		49,000		
Majority		8,315	19.73	▲9.49
PKR gain from BN		Swing		?

Selangor state election, 2013
Party	Candidate	Votes	%	∆%
BN	Mat Nadzari Ahmad Dahlan	21,189	55.48	▲0.36
PKR	Ramachandran Kandasamy	15,791	41.35	▼3.53
Independent	Mustapa Kamal Sapingi	734	1.92	▲1.92
Independent	Mustaf Talib	476	1.25	▲1.25
Total valid votes		38,190	100.00	
Total rejected ballots		545		
Unreturned ballots		89		
Turnout		38,824	89.09	▲11.22
Registered electors		43,578		
Majority		5,398	14.13	▲3.89
BN hold		Swing		
Source(s) "Federal Government Gazette - Notice of Contested Election, State Legislative Assembly for the State of Selangor [P.U. (B) 192/2013]" (PDF). Attorney General's Chambers of Malaysia. 26 April 2013. Archived from the original (PDF) on 29 December 2019. "Federal Government Gazette - Results of Contested Election and Statements of the Poll after the Official Addition of Votes, State Constituencies for the State of Selangor [P.U. (B) 233/2013]" (PDF). Attorney General's Chambers of Malaysia. 22 May 2013. Archived from the original (PDF) on 2 October 2018.

Selangor state election, 2008
Party	Candidate	Votes	%	∆%
BN	Mohd Isa Abu Kasim	11,724	55.12	▼20.89
PKR	Mohd. Nashruddin Abd. Aziz	9,545	44.88	▲20.89
Total valid votes		21,269	100.00	
Total rejected ballots		404		
Unreturned ballots		0		
Turnout		21,673	77.87	▲1.05
Registered electors		27,832		
Majority		2,179	10.24	▼41.78
BN hold		Swing		

Selangor state election, 2004
Party	Candidate	Votes	%	∆%
BN	Zainal Abidin Sakom	12,898	76.01	▲7.41
PKR	Halili Rahmat	4,070	23.99	▼7.41
Total valid votes		16,968	100.00	
Total rejected ballots		412		
Unreturned ballots		6		
Turnout		17,386	76.82	▲3.91
Registered electors		22,632		
Majority		8,828	52.02	▲14.82
BN hold		Swing		

Selangor state election, 1999
Party	Candidate	Votes	%	∆%
BN	Zainal Abidin Sakom	9,048	68.60	▲68.60
PKR	Shariffuddin Budin	4,141	31.40	▲31.40
Total valid votes		13,189	100.00	
Total rejected ballots		446		
Unreturned ballots		13		
Turnout		13,648	72.91	▲72.91
Registered electors		18,718		
Majority		4,907	37.21	▲37.21
BN hold		Swing		

Selangor state election, 1995
Party	Candidate	Votes	%	∆%
On the nomination day, Muhammad Muhammad Taib won uncontested.
BN	Muhammad Muhammad Taib			
Total valid votes			100.00	
Total rejected ballots				
Unreturned ballots				
Turnout				
Registered electors				
Majority				
BN hold		Swing		

Selangor state election, 1990
Party	Candidate	Votes	%	∆%
BN	Muhammad Muhammad Taib	8,575	71.70	▲71.70
DAP	Sinniah Periannan	3,385	28.30	▲28.30
Total valid votes		11,960	100.00	
Total rejected ballots		522		
Unreturned ballots		28		
Turnout		12,510	75.99	▲75.99
Registered electors		16,462		
Majority		5,190	43.39	▲43.39
BN hold		Swing		

Selangor state election, 1986
Party	Candidate	Votes	%	∆%
On the nomination day, Muhammad Muhammad Taib won uncontested.
BN	Muhammad Muhammad Taib			
Total valid votes			100.00	
Total rejected ballots				
Unreturned ballots				
Turnout				
Registered electors				
Majority				
BN hold		Swing		

Selangor state election, 1982
Party	Candidate	Votes	%	∆%
BN	Muhammad Muhammad Taib	6,939	71.42	▲8.35
DAP	Hong Chin Toh	2,777	28.58	▲1.25
Total valid votes		9,716	100.00	
Total rejected ballots		504		
Unreturned ballots		0		
Turnout		10,220	79.00	▲0.81
Registered electors		12,936		
Majority		4,162	42.84	▲7.11
BN hold		Swing		

Selangor state election, 1978
Party	Candidate	Votes	%	∆%
BN	Rosedin Yaacob	5,032	63.07	▼7.48
DAP	Law See Lam	2,181	27.33	▼2.12
PAS	Yusof Ahmad	703	8.81	▲8.81
PEKEMAS	Ali Rahman	63	0.79	▲0.79
Total valid votes		7,979	100.00	
Total rejected ballots		499		
Unreturned ballots		0		
Turnout		8,478	78.20	▲1.31
Registered electors		10,842		
Majority		2,851	35.73	▼5.37
BN hold		Swing		

Selangor state election, 1974
Party	Candidate	Votes	%
BN	Rosedin Yaacob	4,425	70.55
DAP	Hamdan Husin	1,847	29.45
Total valid votes		6,272	100.00
Total rejected ballots		93	
Unreturned ballots			
Turnout		6,365	72.26
Registered electors		8,808	
Majority		2,578	41.10
This was a new constituency created.
