= Kuala Kubu Baharu (state constituency) =

State constituency in Selangor, Malaysia

Kuala Kubu Baharu (N06)
Selangor constituency

State constituency
- Legislature: Selangor State Legislative Assembly
MLA
Pang Sock Tao
PH
- Constituency created: 1974
- First contested: 1974
- Last contested: 2024

Demographics
- Electors (2023): 40,015

Kuala Kubu Baharu is a state constituency in Selangor, Malaysia, that has been represented in the Selangor State Legislative Assembly since 1974. The seat has been represented by Pang Sock Tao of Pakatan Harapan (PH) since 2024.

The state constituency was created in the 1974 redistribution and is mandated to return a single member to the Selangor State Legislative Assembly under the first past the post voting system.

== Demographics ==
Ethnic breakdown of Kuala Kubu Baharu's electorate as of 2024
1. Malay (47.6%)
2. Chinese (30.1%)
3. Indian (17.4%)
4. Other ethnicities (4.22%)
5. Sarawak Bumiputera (0.38%)
6. Sabah Bumiputera (0.26%)

== History ==
=== Polling districts ===
According to the federal gazette issued on 30 March 2018, the Kuala Kubu Baharu constituency is divided into 16 polling districts.

| State constituency | Polling Districts | Code | Location |
|---|---|---|---|
| Kuala Kubu Baharu (N06） | Kampung Baharu Kerling | 094/06/01 | SJK (C) Kerling |
| Kuala Kubu Baharu (N06） | Pertak | 094/06/02 | SJK (C) Bukit Fraser; SMK Ampang Pechah (Bestari) |
| Kuala Kubu Baharu (N06） | Ampang Pechah | 094/06/03 | SMK Ampang Pechah |
| Kuala Kubu Baharu (N06） | Kampung Baharu China K.K.B | 094/06/04 | SJK (C) Khing Ming Kuala Kubu Bharu |
| Kuala Kubu Baharu (N06） | Bandar Kuala Kubu Baharu | 094/06/05 | SMK Dato' Haji Kamaruddin Kuala Kubu Bharu |
| Kuala Kubu Baharu (N06） | Kampung Air Jernih | 094/06/06 | SMK Kuala Kubu Bharu (Sm3kb) Jalan Kolam Air |
| Kuala Kubu Baharu (N06） | Kerling | 094/06/07 | SK Kerling |
| Kuala Kubu Baharu (N06） | Lembah Beringin | 094/06/08 | SJK (T) Ladang Kerling |
| Kuala Kubu Baharu (N06） | Ladang Nigel Gardner | 094/06/09 | SJK (T) Nigel Gardner Bestari Jaya |
| Kuala Kubu Baharu (N06） | Jalan Kuala Keli | 094/06/10 | SJK (C) Rasa |
| Kuala Kubu Baharu (N06） | Kampung Baharu Rasa | 094/06/11 | SJK (C) Rasa |
| Kuala Kubu Baharu (N06） | Pekan Rasa | 094/06/12 | Dewan Orang ramai Jalan Anggerik |
| Kuala Kubu Baharu (N06） | Kampung Baharu Batang Kali | 094/06/13 | SJK (C) Batang Kali |
| Kuala Kubu Baharu (N06） | Hulu Yam Lama | 094/06/14 | SJK (C) Choong Chee Hulu Yam Lama |
| Kuala Kubu Baharu (N06） | Bandar Utama Batang Kali | 094/06/15 | SK Bandar Baru Batang Kali |
| Kuala Kubu Baharu (N06） | Batu 30 Hulu Yam | 094/06/16 | SK Hulu Yam Lama |

=== Representation history ===
Members of the Legislative Assembly for Kuala Kubu Baharu
| Assembly | No | Years | Member | Party |
Constituency created from Kuala Kubu and Ulu Bernam
Kuala Kubu Bharu
| 4th | N08 | 1974–1978 | Chan Keong Hon (陈强汉) | BN (MCA) |
| 5th | N08 | 1978–1982 | Pan Su Peng (潘仕平) | DAP |
| 6th | N08 | 1982–1986 | Choo Yong Fatt (曹勇发) | BN (MCA) |
Kuala Kubu Baharu
| 7th | N08 | 1986–1990 | Wong Ah Taih (王亚泰) | BN (MCA) |
| 8th | N08 | 1990–1995 | Wong Ah Taih (王亚泰) | BN (MCA) |
| 9th | N08 | 1995–1999 | Ch'ng Toh Eng (庄祷融) | BN (MCA) |
| 10th | N08 | 1999–2004 | Ch'ng Toh Eng (庄祷融) | BN (MCA) |
| 11th | N06 | 2004–2008 | Ch'ng Toh Eng (庄祷融) | BN (MCA) |
| 12th | N06 | 2008–2013 | Wong Koon Mun (黄冠文) | BN (MCA) |
| 13th | N06 | 2013–2015 | Lee Kee Hiong (李继香) | PR (DAP) |
| 13th | N06 | 2015–2018 | Lee Kee Hiong (李继香) | PH (DAP) |
| 14th | N06 | 2018–2023 | Lee Kee Hiong (李继香) | PH (DAP) |
| 15th | N06 | 2023–2024 | Lee Kee Hiong (李继香) | PH (DAP) |
| 15th | N06 | 2024–present | Pang Sock Tao (彭小桃) | PH (DAP) |

== Election results ==
Selangor state by-election, 11 May 2024 Upon the death of incumbent, Lee Kee Hiong
| Party | Candidate | Votes | % | ∆% |
|---|---|---|---|---|
| PH | Pang Sock Tao | 14,000 | 57.21 | ▲2.81 |
| PN | Khairul Azhari Saut | 10,131 | 41.40 | ▲2.07 |
| Independent | Eris Nyau Ke Xin | 188 | 0.77 | ▲0.77 |
| Parti Rakyat Malaysia | Hafizah Zainuddin | 152 | 0.62 | ▼1.28 |
| Total valid votes | | 24,471 | 100.00 | |
| Total rejected ballots | | 263 | | |
| Unreturned ballots | | 11 | | |
| Turnout | | 24,745 | 61.51 | ▼7.74 |
| Registered electors | | 40,226 | | |
| Majority | | 3,869 | 15.80 | ▲0.73 |
| PH hold | | Swing | | |

Selangor state election, 2023
| Party | Candidate | Votes | % | ∆% |
|---|---|---|---|---|
| PH | Lee Kee Hiong | 14,862 | 54.40 | ▼3.45 |
| PN | Henry Teoh Kien Hong | 10,743 | 39.33 | ▲39.33 |
| MUDA | Sivaprakash Ramasamy | 1,186 | 4.34 | ▲4.34 |
| Parti Rakyat Malaysia | Chang Boon Lai | 527 | 1.90 | ▲1.90 |
| Total valid votes | | 27,318 | 100.00 | |
| Total rejected ballots | | 364 | | |
| Unreturned ballots | | 27 | | |
| Turnout | | 27,709 | 69.25 | ▼15.69 |
| Registered electors | | 40,015 | | |
| Majority | | 4,119 | 15.07 | ▼14.19 |
| PH hold | | Swing | | |

Selangor state election, 2018
| Party | Candidate | Votes | % | ∆% |
|---|---|---|---|---|
| PKR | Lee Kee Hiong | 14,101 | 57.85 | ▲57.85 |
| BN | Wong Koon Mun | 6,967 | 28.59 | ▼15.26 |
| PAS | Naharudin Abdul Rashid | 3,306 | 13.56 | ▲13.56 |
| Total valid votes | | 24,374 | 100.00 | |
| Total rejected ballots | | 310 | | |
| Unreturned ballots | | 62 | | |
| Turnout | | 24,746 | 84.94 | ▼0.80 |
| Registered electors | | 29,133 | | |
| Majority | | 7,134 | 29.26 | ▲19.65 |
| PKR hold | | Swing | | |

Selangor state election, 2013
| Party | Candidate | Votes | % | ∆% |
|---|---|---|---|---|
| DAP | Lee Kee Hiong | 9,469 | 53.46 | ▲5.23 |
| BN | Ooi Hui Wen @ Jessie Ooi | 7,767 | 43.85 | ▼7.92 |
| Independent | Yoong Tham Fook | 250 | 1.41 | ▲1.41 |
| Independent | Pritpal Singh Mender Singh | 117 | 0.66 | ▲0.66 |
| Independent | Nadarajah Supramaniam | 108 | 0.61 | ▲0.61 |
| Total valid votes | | 17,711 | 100.00 | |
| Total rejected ballots | | 390 | | |
| Unreturned ballots | | 64 | | |
| Turnout | | 18,165 | 85.74 | ▲12.53 |
| Registered electors | | 21,186 | | |
| Majority | | 1,702 | 9.61 | ▲6.07 |
| DAP gain from BN | | Swing | | ? |
Source(s) "Federal Government Gazette - Notice of Contested Election, State Legislative Assembly for the State of Selangor [P.U. (B) 192/2013]" (PDF). Attorney General's Chambers of Malaysia. 26 April 2013. Archived from the original (PDF) on 2019-12-29. "Federal Government Gazette - Results of Contested Election and Statements of the Poll after the Official Addition of Votes, State Constituencies for the State of Selangor [P.U. (B) 233/2013]" (PDF). Attorney General's Chambers of Malaysia. 22 May 2013. Archived from the original (PDF) on 2018-10-02.

Selangor state election, 2008
| Party | Candidate | Votes | % | ∆% |
|---|---|---|---|---|
| BN | Wong Koon Mun | 6,555 | 51.77 | ▼27.93 |
| DAP | K Annamalai Ramu Kandasamy | 6,107 | 48.23 | ▲27.93 |
| Total valid votes | | 12,662 | 100.00 | |
| Total rejected ballots | | 549 | | |
| Unreturned ballots | | 122 | | |
| Turnout | | 13,333 | 73.21 | ▲2.14 |
| Registered electors | | 18,212 | | |
| Majority | | 448 | 3.54 | ▼55.86 |
| BN hold | | Swing | | |

Selangor state election, 2004
| Party | Candidate | Votes | % | ∆% |
|---|---|---|---|---|
| BN | Ch'ng Toh Eng | 10,005 | 79.70 | ▲7.80 |
| DAP | Kuan Wai Soon | 2,549 | 20.30 | ▼7.80 |
| Total valid votes | | 12,554 | 100.00 | |
| Total rejected ballots | | 531 | | |
| Unreturned ballots | | 6 | | |
| Turnout | | 13,091 | 71.07 | ▲0.57 |
| Registered electors | | 18,419 | | |
| Majority | | 7,456 | 59.40 | ▼15.60 |
| BN hold | | Swing | | |

Selangor state election, 1999
| Party | Candidate | Votes | % | ∆% |
|---|---|---|---|---|
| BN | Ch'ng Toh Eng | 7,907 | 71.90 | ▲71.90 |
| DAP | Cheah Kam Chiew | 3,090 | 28.10 | ▲28.10 |
| Total valid votes | | 10,997 | 100.00 | |
| Total rejected ballots | | 535 | | |
| Unreturned ballots | | 186 | | |
| Turnout | | 11,718 | 70.50 | ▲70.50 |
| Registered electors | | 16,622 | | |
| Majority | | 4,817 | 43.80 | ▲43.80 |
| BN hold | | Swing | | |

Selangor state election, 1995
| Party | Candidate | Votes | % | ∆% |
|---|---|---|---|---|
On the nomination day, Ch'ng Toh Eng won uncontested.
| BN | Ch'ng Toh Eng | | | |
| Total valid votes | | | 100.00 | |
| Total rejected ballots | | | | |
| Unreturned ballots | | | | |
| Turnout | | | | |
| Registered electors | | | | |
| Majority | | | | |
| BN hold | | Swing | | |

Selangor state election, 1990
| Party | Candidate | Votes | % | ∆% |
|---|---|---|---|---|
| BN | Wong Ah Taih | 5,565 | 60.27 | ▲11.62 |
| DAP | Tan Chik Poh | 3,669 | 39.73 | ▼3.01 |
| Total valid votes | | 9,234 | 100.00 | |
| Total rejected ballots | | 683 | | |
| Unreturned ballots | | 0 | | |
| Turnout | | 9,917 | 69.33 | ▲0.88 |
| Registered electors | | 14,304 | | |
| Majority | | 1,896 | 20.54 | ▲14.63 |
| BN hold | | Swing | | |

Selangor state election, 1986
| Party | Candidate | Votes | % | ∆% |
|---|---|---|---|---|
| BN | Wong Ah Taih | 3,962 | 48.65 | ▼10.51 |
| DAP | Leow Hok Len | 3,481 | 42.74 | ▲27.38 |
| SDP | Mohamed Arif Kamaruddin | 701 | 8.61 | ▼8.61 |
| Total valid votes | | 8,144 | 100.00 | |
| Total rejected ballots | | 557 | | |
| Unreturned ballots | | 0 | | |
| Turnout | | 8,701 | 68.45 | ▼5.64 |
| Registered electors | | 12,712 | | |
| Majority | | 481 | 5.91 | ▼27.77 |
| BN hold | | Swing | | |

Selangor state election, 1982: Kuala Kubu Bharu
| Party | Candidate | Votes | % | ∆% |
|---|---|---|---|---|
| BN | Choo Yoong Fatt | 5,645 | 59.16 | ▲59.16 |
| Independent | Wong Kim Wah | 2,431 | 25.48 | ▲25.48 |
| DAP | Pan Su Peng | 1,466 | 15.36 | ▼67.83 |
| Total valid votes | | 9,542 | 100.00 | |
| Total rejected ballots | | 426 | | |
| Unreturned ballots | | 0 | | |
| Turnout | | 9,968 | 74.09 | ▲0.28 |
| Registered electors | | 13,453 | | |
| Majority | | 3,214 | 33.68 | ▼32.70 |
| BN gain from DAP | | Swing | | ? |

Selangor state election, 1978: Kuala Kubu Bharu
| Party | Candidate | Votes | % | ∆% |
|---|---|---|---|---|
| DAP | Pan Su Peng | 3,202 | 83.19 | ▲83.19 |
| Independent | Yap Hon Chu | 647 | 16.81 | ▲16.81 |
| Total valid votes | | 3,849 | 100.00 | |
| Total rejected ballots | | 4,955 | | |
| Unreturned ballots | | 0 | | |
| Turnout | | 8,804 | 73.81 | ▼7.14 |
| Registered electors | | 11,928 | | |
| Majority | | 2,555 | 66.38 | ▲32.46 |
| DAP gain from BN | | Swing | | ? |

Selangor state election, 1974: Kuala Kubu Bharu
| Party | Candidate | Votes | % |
|---|---|---|---|
| BN | Chan Keong Hon | | |
| DAP | Leong Chin Hoe | | |
| Total valid votes | | | 100.00 |
| Total rejected ballots | | 529 | |
| Unreturned ballots | | | |
| Turnout | | | |
| Registered electors | | 9,760 | |
| Majority | | 2,412 | |
This was a new constituency created.
