= Haniza Talha =

Malaysian politician

Haniza Talha SMS
- النساء محمد طلحة

Non-executive Chairperson of the Syarikat Perumahan Negara Berhad
- In office 2 April 2021 – 15 July 2022
- Minister: Zuraida Kamaruddin
- Chief Executive Officer: Hasleen Isnin
- Preceded by: Hasbullah Osman
- Succeeded by: Mohd Nizar Zakaria

Member of the Selangor State Executive Council (Housing and Urban Living)
- In office 19 May 2018 – 28 June 2020
- Monarch: Sharafuddin
- Menteri Besar: Azmin Ali (19 May–19 June 2018); Amirudin Shari (2018–2020)
- Preceded by: Iskandar Abdul Samad
- Succeeded by: Rodziah Ismail
- Constituency: Lembah Jaya

Member of the Selangor State Legislative Assembly for Lembah Jaya
- In office 9 May 2018 – 12 August 2023
- Preceded by: Khasim Abdul Aziz (PAS)
- Succeeded by: Syed Ahmad Syed Abdul Rahman Alhadad (PH–PKR)
- Majority: 14,790 (2018)

Member of the Selangor State Legislative Assembly for Taman Medan
- In office 8 March 2008 – 9 May 2018
- Preceded by: Ab Wahab Ibrahim (BN–UMNO)
- Succeeded by: Syamsul Firdaus Mohamed Supri (PH–PKR)
- Majority: 4,433 (2008); 3,731 (2013)

2nd Deputy President of the Parti Bangsa Malaysia
- In office 8 January 2022 – 27 December 2022 Serving with Wong Judat & Edmund Santhara Kumar Ramanaidu
- President: Larry Sng Wei Shien
- Preceded by: Larry Sng Wei Shien
- Succeeded by: Steven Choong Shiau Yoon

Women Chief of the People's Justice Party
- In office 18 November 2018 – 14 April 2020
- President: Anwar Ibrahim
- Deputy: Daroyah Alwi
- Preceded by: Zuraida Kamaruddin
- Succeeded by: Fuziah Salleh

Faction represented in Selangor State Legislative Assembly
- 2008–2018: People's Justice Party
- 2018–2020: Pakatan Harapan
- 2020: Independent
- 2020–2022: Perikatan Nasional
- 2022–2023: Parti Bangsa Malaysia

Personal details
- Born: Haniza binti Mohamed Talha; 12 November 1962 (age 63) Batu Gajah, Perak, Federation of Malaya (now Malaysia)
- Citizenship: Malaysian
- Party: People's Justice Party (PKR) (–2020); Independent (2020–2022); Parti Bangsa Malaysia (PBM) (since 2022)
- Other political affiliations: Pakatan Harapan (PH) (–2020)
- Spouse: Shahrudin Omar
- Children: 7
- Education: University of Sheffield
- Occupation: Politician

Haniza binti Mohamed Talha (born 12 November 1962) is a Malaysian politician who served as Non-executive Chairperson of the Syarikat Perumahan Negara Berhad (SPNB) from April 2021 to her removal from the position in July 2022, Member of the Selangor State Executive Council (EXCO) from May 2018 to June 2020 and Member of the Selangor State Legislative Assembly (MLA) for Lembah Jaya from May 2018 to August 2023 and for Taman Medan from March 2008 to May 2018. She is a member of the Parti Bangsa Malaysia (PBM). She also served as the 2nd Deputy President of PBM from January to her removal from the party deputy presidency in December 2022. She was a member of the People's Justice Party (PKR), a component party of the Pakatan Harapan (PH) coalition.

== Background ==
Haniza was born 12 November 1962 in Batu Gajah, Perak. She received her early education in Perak and Penang, furthering her studies in architecture at the University of Sheffield, United Kingdom.

She used to work as a translator and writer on the Malaysia Today website.

In the 12th General Election in 2008 she was elected to be the State Assemblyman (ADN) for the Taman Medan area, Selangor, until 2013. She was also appointed as the Deputy Speaker of the Selangor State Assembly in 2008, then became the first woman to hold office that.

Haniza was also a member of the Selangor Select Committee on Capability, Accountability and Transparency (Selcat). In Parti Keadilan Rakyat (Keadilan) Haniza is the Selangor State Women's Justice Chief.

She married Shahrudin Omar and had seven children.

== Community Figure ==
As an elected representative, Haniza is highly respected for her concern in addressing local community issues in Taman Medan. She is very concerned with the welfare of senior citizens by implementing various community programs with them, including the Golden Age Friendly Scheme and the Jom Shopping program.

People with disabilities are also helped by her through the provision of free health cards and the provision of various infrastructure facilities such as 'ramp' for wheelchairs, and a special parking area at the Taman Medan People's Service Center.

In the education sector, he seeks a lot of assistance to schools including SJK (C) Chen Moh, SJK (C) Yuk Chun, SRA Ibnu Rushd and KAFA Integrasi.

To look after the welfare of young people, Haniza successfully created the Youth Square for youth sports and recreation facilities. The 'Homework Room' was built to help the children of the residents do their academic work while being monitored by the volunteer staff. Haniza also cares about building a balanced youth, by implementing the Taman Medan Progressive Student Program and the Selangor Dream Generation Program (GeMS).

== Deputy Speaker of the State Assembly ==
Haniza's appointment as the Deputy Speaker of the Selangor State Assembly in 2008 has made history in Malaysia as the first woman to hold the post in any state. The announcement on the appointment was made by Selangor Menteri Besar Tan Sri Abdul Khalid Ibrahim on 20 April 2008.

Haniza's achievement is mentioned as being the pride of women, especially in Taman Medan, either from her own party or the Barisan Nasional (BN) party.

== Toll Reduction NPE PJS2 ==
Haniza won the insistence of the people of Taman Medan to abolish the toll on the New Pantai Expressway (NPE) at PJS2. This toll which charges RM1.60 is said to burden the residents who make NPE the main route. The toll is also said to have caused congestion and accidents in the area. Through a press conference held at his office on May 7, 2008, Haniza urged the federal government to look into the issue.

This insistence was also supported by the locals (including those from the UMNO party) who staged a protest on 7 February 2009.

These insistence efforts bore fruit on 14 February 2009 when the federal government agreed to abolish tolls on the road, in the lane leading to Kuala Lumpur. However, tolls in the lanes towards Subang Jaya and Kelana Jaya were maintained.

Haniza continued its efforts to lobby the federal government to abolish tolls in both lanes as according to her, congestion and security problems were not resolved with the closure of only one lane.

Finally, on 17 February 2001, the federal government announced the reduction of tolls on the highway leading to Subang Jaya and Kelana Jaya, from RM1.60 to RM1.00.

The NPE is 19.5 kilometers long, opened since April 30, 2004. It is worth RM1.2 billion and is operated by the concessionaire New Pantai Express Way Sdn Bhd.

== Elections ==
In the 12th Malaysian general election in 2008, Haniza won the Taman Medan Selangor State Assembly seat from BN. She got 16,803 votes and won with a majority of 4,433 votes defeating BN candidate Munaliza Hamzah.

In the 13th Malaysian general election dated 5 May 2013, Haniza defended the Taman Medan State Assembly seat against four other candidates - one from the Barisan Nasional (BN) party, one from the KITA party and two others as independent candidates. The result was that Haniza won the contest by garnering 20,478 votes (equivalent to 3,731 majority votes), indicating that she had won the trust of the residents of Taman Medan whom she represented in the previous term.

In the 14th Malaysian general election dated 9 May 2018, Haniza managed to seize the Lembah Jaya Selangor State Assembly seat from PAS. She got 22,512 votes and won with a majority of 14,790 votes defeating three other candidates - one from the Barisan Nasional party, one from the PAS party who was also the incumbent in the previous term, Khasim Abdul Aziz and another Parti Rakyat Malaysia candidate.

In the 15th Malaysian general election dated 19 November 2022, Haniza contested for the Hulu Selangor parliamentary seat. She lost to PAS' Mohd Hasnizan Harun and managed to garner only 1,013 (0.83%) votes.

== Election results ==
Parliament of Malaysia
Year	Constituency	Candidate	Votes	Pct	Opponent(s)	Votes	Pct	Ballots cast	Majority	Turnout
2022	P094 Hulu Selangor	Haniza Mohamed Talha (PBM)	1,013	0.83%	Mohd Hasnizan Harun (PAS)	46,823	38.24%	122,442	1,562	79.34%
2022	P094 Hulu Selangor	Haniza Mohamed Talha (PBM)	1,013	0.83%	Sathia Prakash Nadarajan (PKR)	45,261	36.97%	122,442	1,562	79.34%
2022	P094 Hulu Selangor	Haniza Mohamed Talha (PBM)	1,013	0.83%	Mohan Thangarasu (MIC)	27,050	22.09%	122,442	1,562	79.34%
2022	P094 Hulu Selangor	Haniza Mohamed Talha (PBM)	1,013	0.83%	Harumaini Omar (PEJUANG)	1,849	1.51%	122,442	1,562	79.34%
2022	P094 Hulu Selangor	Haniza Mohamed Talha (PBM)	1,013	0.83%	Azlinda Baroni (IND)	446	0.36%	122,442	1,562	79.34%

Selangor State Legislative Assembly
Year	Constituency	Candidate	Votes	Pct	Opponent(s)	Votes	Pct	Ballots cast	Majority	Turnout
2008	N33 Taman Medan	Haniza Mohamed Talha (PKR)	16,803	57.60%	Munaliza Hamzah (UMNO)	12,370	42.40%	29,752	4,433	74.11%
2013	N33 Taman Medan	Haniza Mohamed Talha (PKR)	20,478	54.59%	Ab Wahab Ibrahim (UMNO)	16,747	44.64%	38,101	3,731	84.72%
2013	N33 Taman Medan	Haniza Mohamed Talha (PKR)	20,478	54.59%	Kamarul Jaman Seeni Mohideen (IND)	213	0.57%	38,101	3,731	84.72%
2013	N33 Taman Medan	Haniza Mohamed Talha (PKR)	20,478	54.59%	Johan Asik (KITA)	55	0.15%	38,101	3,731	84.72%
2013	N33 Taman Medan	Haniza Mohamed Talha (PKR)	20,478	54.59%	Muhammad Zarqasyi Zulkarnain (IND)	21	0.06%	38,101	3,731	84.72%
2018	N20 Lembah Jaya	Haniza Mohamed Talha (PKR)	22,612	59.60%	Muhamad Nizam Shith (UMNO)	7,722	20.45%	38,128	14,790	84.35%
2018	N20 Lembah Jaya	Haniza Mohamed Talha (PKR)	22,612	59.60%	Khasim Abdul Aziz (PAS)	7,358	19.48%	38,128	14,790	84.35%
2018	N20 Lembah Jaya	Haniza Mohamed Talha (PKR)	22,612	59.60%	Norizwan Mohamed (PRM)	177	0.47%	38,128	14,790	84.35%

== Honours ==
- Selangor
  - Companion of the Order of the Crown of Selangor (SMS) (2017)
