= Homeland Fighter's Party =

- Malay name: Parti Pejuang Tanah Air
- Abbreviation: PEJUANG
- President: Mukhriz Mahathir
- Chairman: Vacant
- Secretary-General: Amiruddin Hamzah
- Deputy President: Mior Nor Haidir Suhaimi
- Youth Chief: Muhammad Fikri Ahmad
- Information Chief: Muhammad Rafique Rashid Ali
- Women Chief: Che Asmah Ibrahim
- Women Youth Chief: Nurul Ashikin Mabahwi
- Founder: Mahathir Mohamad
- Founded: 12 August 2020
- Registered: 8 July 2021
- Legalised: 8 July 2021
- Split from: BERSATU
- Headquarters: N-02-08, Blok N, Conezion Commercial Centre, Lebuhraya IRC3, IOI Resort City, 62502 Putrajaya, Wilayah Persekutuan Putrajaya, Malaysia
- Ideology: Ketuanan Melayu; Malay nationalism Anti-corruption; Right-wing populism Islamism
- Political position: Right-wing
- National affiliation: Perikatan Nasional (since 2026) (Note: The party was formerly part of Gerakan Tanah Air (2022–2023) and was aligned with Pakatan Harapan and Warisan Plus (May–September 2020). Through PN it is aligned with Barisan Nasional (2020-2022)); Ikatan Prihatin Rakyat (2025–2026)
- Colours: Blue pantone
- Slogan: Pejuang Berprinsip (Principled Fighters)
- Anthem: Berjuang Untukmu
- Dewan Negara: 0 / 70
- Dewan Rakyat: 0 / 222
- Dewan Undangan Negeri: 0 / 607
- Chief ministers in Malaysia (Menteri Besar & Chief Minister): 0 / 13

Election symbol
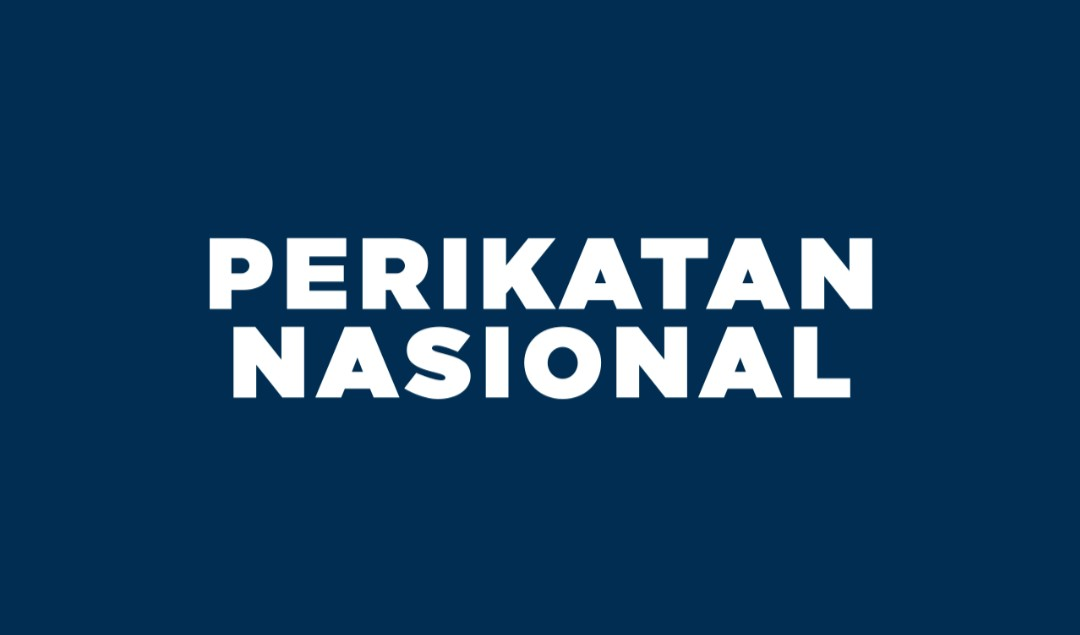

Party flag

Website
- pejuang.org.my

The Homeland Fighter's Party (Malay: Parti Pejuang Tanah Air, PEJUANG) is a right-wing, nationalist political party of Malaysia, formed in August 2020 by former prime minister Mahathir Mohamad in opposition to then ruling Perikatan Nasional (PN) government led by prime minister, chairman of PN and president of the Malaysian United Indigenous Party (BERSATU) Muhyiddin Yassin. In 2026, it became a member of Perikatan Nasional (PN), which was by then in opposition.

The logo of PEJUANG party consists of a stylised Jawi letter, ڤ (P), which is the first letter in the word "Pejuang".

== History ==
The party was formed by Mahathir Mohamad at the beginning of the 2020–2022 Malaysian political crisis, which was triggered by his resignation as prime minister and the exit of his Malaysian United Indigenous Party (BERSATU) from the governing Pakatan Harapan coalition. Mahathir and four MPs from BERSATU later rejected the leadership of Muhyiddin Yassin, BERSATU's president, when he was appointed prime minister with the backing of a new coalition, and were subsequently expelled from the party in May. They were later joined by Shahruddin Md Salleh, who resigned as deputy minister of works only three months after his appointment.

Mahathir announced his intentions to form a new Malay-based party ahead of the 2020 Slim by-election, but was not joined in his endeavour by former youth minister Syed Saddiq, a fellow BERSATU expellee.

The party made its electoral debut at the Slim by-election held in August, where it finished a distant second. Fewer than three months later, former education minister Maszlee Malik announced his departure from the party, at this point had yet to be formally registered, to sit as an independent MP. While still unregistered and not putting candidate Pejuang explicitly endorsed Warisan Plus campaign in 2020 Sabah state election.

The party was formally registered in July 2021 after judicial review against the state authorities' decision to reject its application.

While stating that the party was open to the possibility of co-operating with other parties, it contested the 2022 Johor state election outside of any coalition and fared poorly. It was defeated in the 42 (out of 56 total seats available) seats it contested. Party president Mukhriz Mahathir blamed the lack of exposure of the party's logo as one of the reasons for their defeat.

In the 2022 general election, the party contested 158 out of 222 seats available as part of the Gerakan Tanah Air coalition, but failed to be elected in any of them. The party's three sitting MPs that sought re-election, Mahathir in Langkawi, Mukhriz in Jerlun, and Amiruddin Hamzah in Kubang Pasu, fared poorly and lost their deposits.

A number of party leaders subsequently resigned from their leadership roles, including Mahathir as party chairman.

In January 2023, the party left Gerakan Tanah Air, which triggered the departure of a number of high-profile members, including Mahathir and deputy president Marzuki Yahya.

In February 2023, the party's number of elected representatives was reduced to four after its Selangor state chairman was ordered to vacate his Batang Kali in the Selangor legislative assembly as a result of non-attendance.

The party lost the remainder of its representation after opting not to contest in the 2023 Malaysian state elections, which followed Perikatan Nasional's decision not to admit it as a component party in March 2023.

In June 2026, Perikatan Nasional decided to admit the party alongside with Parti Wawasan Negara (which at the point was legally known as Parti Cinta Malaysia).

== List of leaders ==
Chairman

No.	Name (Birth–Death)	Portrait	Term of office	
1	Mahathir Mohamad (b. 1925)		12 August 2020	17 December 2022

President

No.	Name (Birth–Death)	Portrait	Term of office	
1	Mukhriz Mahathir (b. 1964)		12 August 2020	Incumbent

== Leadership structure ==
- Chairman:
  - Vacant
- President:
  - Mukhriz Mahathir
- Deputy President:
  - Mior Nor Haidir Suhaimi
- Women's Chief (Pejuanita):
  - Che Asmah Ibrahim
- Youth's Chief (Pejuang Muda):
  - Muhammad Fikri Ahmad
- Women's Youth Chief (Pejuanita Muda):
  - Nurul Ashikin Mabahwi
- Secretary-General:
  - Amiruddin Hamzah
- Treasurer:
  - Jamil Bidin
- Information Director:
  - Rafique Rashid Ali
- Welfare Board Chairman:
  - Vacant
- Legal Board Chairman:
  - Mior Nor Haidir Suhaimi
- Economic Affairs Board Chairman:
  - Vacant
- National Unity Board Chairman:
  - Azman Mohd Hashim
- NGO Board Chairman:
  - Amir Khusyairi Mohamad Tanusi
- Chairperson of the Training Bureau:
  - Wan Azliana Wan Adnan
- Chairperson of the International Relations Bureau:
  - Tariq Ismail Mustafa
- Chairperson of the Consumer Affairs Bureau:
  - Afiqah Mohammad
- Chairperson of the Sabah & Sarawak Affairs Bureau:
  - Nicholas Sylvester
- Chairperson of the Treasury, Communications and Multimedia Bureau:
  - Nabil Nih Ramli
- Central Executive Council members:
  - Amir Khusyairi Mohamad Tanusi
  - Ruslin Hasan
  - Sazmi Miah
  - Tariq Ismail
  - Sallehuddin Amiruddin
  - Ulya Aqamah Husamudin
  - Mohd Akmal Mohd Yusoff
  - Nur Amalina Izzati Tajuddin
- State Chairmen:
  - Wilayah Persekutuan: Kamal Abdul Aziz
  - Johor: Nornekman Osman
  - Kedah: Azimi Daim
  - Kelantan: Sazmi Miah
  - Malacca: Sheikh Ikhzan Sheikh Salleh
  - Negeri Sembilan: Norizan Ahmad
  - Pahang: Hamzah Jaafar
  - Perak: Mior Nor Haidir Suhaimi
  - Perlis: Rosley Mat
  - Penang: Muzaimi Ezrin Mukhtar
  - Sabah: Nicholas Sylvester
  - Selangor: Harumaini Omar
  - Terengganu: Vacant

== Members of Parliament ==
=== Dewan Negara (Senate) ===
==== Current Senators (15th Malaysian Parliament) ====
The party is currently unrepresented at Dewan Negara.

==== Previous senators ====
14th Malaysian Parliament

- Marzuki Yahya (2020–2021)

=== Dewan Rakyat (House of Representatives) ===
==== Current Members of Parliament (15th Malaysian Parliament) ====
The party is currently unrepresented at Dewan Rakyat.

==== Previous MPs ====
14th Malaysian Parliament

- Mahathir Mohamad (Langkawi, 2020–2022)
- Mukhriz Mahathir (Jerlun, 2020–2022)
- Amiruddin Hamzah (Kubang Pasu, 2020–2022)
- Shahruddin Md Salleh (Sri Gading, 2020–2022)

== Dewan Undangan Negeri (State Legislative Assembly) ==
=== Malaysian State Assembly Representatives ===
The party currently has no representative in any Malaysia State Assembly.

==== Previous Members of State Legislative Assembly ====
14th Kedah State Legislative Assembly

- Mukhriz Mahathir (Jitra, 2020–2023)
- Amiruddin Hamzah (Anak Bukit, 2020–2023)

14th Selangor State Legislative Assembly

- Harumaini Omar (Batang Kali, 2020–2023)
- Mohd Shaid Rosli (Jeram, 2020–2023)
- Sallehudin Amiruddin (Kuang, 2020–2023)

== General Election results ==
Election	Total seats won	Seats contested	Total votes	Voting percentage	Outcome of election	Election leader
2022	0 / 222	68	79,594	0.8%	▼4 seats; No representation in Parliament (Gerakan Tanah Air)	Mukhriz Mahathir

== State election results ==
State assembly	Election	Votes	%	Seats	Won/contested	+/–	Position (Note: As part of electoral coalition.)	Status
Perlis	2022	905	0.6	0 / 15	0 / 6	Steady	5th (Gerakan Tanah Air)	No seats
Kedah	2023	Did not contest						No seats
Kelantan	2023	Did not contest						No seats
Terengganu	2023	Did not contest						No seats
Penang	2023	Did not contest						No seats
Perak	2022	4,277	0.3	0 / 59	0 / 20	Steady	4th (Gerakan Tanah Air)	No seats
Pahang	2022	3,403	0.4	0 / 42	0 / 14	Steady	4th (Gerakan Tanah Air)	No seats
Selangor	2023	Did not contest						No seats
Negeri Sembilan	2026	Did not contest						No seats
Malacca	2026	Did not contest						No seats
Johor	2026	1,888	0.1	0 / 56	0 / 1	Steady	▲3rd (Perikatan Nasional)	No seats
Sabah	2025	Did not contest						No seats
Sarawak	2021	Did not contest						No seats

Note

State election	State Legislative Assembly													
State election	Perlis	Kedah	Kelantan	Terengganu	Penang	Perak	Pahang	Selangor	Negeri Sembilan	Malacca	Johor	Sabah	Sarawak	Total won / Total contested
2/3 majority	2 / 3	2 / 3	2 / 3	2 / 3	2 / 3	2 / 3	2 / 3	2 / 3	2 / 3	2 / 3	2 / 3	2 / 3	2 / 3	Legislative Assembly
2022											0 / 56			0 / 42
2022	0 / 15					0 / 59	0 / 42							0 / 40
2026											0 / 56			0 / 1

== See also ==
- Politics of Malaysia
- List of political parties in Malaysia
