= Malaysian Nuclear Agency =

Malaysian research centre

Coordinates: 2.9067566°N 101.7669592°E

- Agensi Nuklear Malaysia
- Logo of Nuklear Malaysia

Agency overview
- Formed: 1973; 53 years ago
- Jurisdiction: Government of Malaysia
- Headquarters: Agensi Nuklear Malaysia (Nuklear Malaysia), Bangi, 43000 Kajang, Selangor, Malaysia
- Minister responsible: Chang Lih Kang, Minister of Science, Technology and Innovation
- Agency executives: Rosli Darmawan, Director General; Muhammad Rawi Mohamed Zin, Deputy Director General (Research & Technology Development Programme); Ishak Mansor, Deputy Director General (Technical Service Programme)
- Parent department: Ministry of Science, Technology and Innovation
- Website: www.nuclearmalaysia.gov.my

The Malaysian Nuclear Agency (Malay: Agensi Nuklear Malaysia, ANM) or Nuklear Malaysia is a Malaysian nuclear technology research facility located in Bangi, Selangor. ANM introduces and promotes the application of nuclear science and technology for national development.

It is located near the National University of Malaysia (UKM) and the Malaysia Genome and Vaccine Institute (MGVI) in Bangi.

== History ==
Established on 19 September 1972, ANM was then known as the Centre for Application of Nuclear Malaysia (CRANE). It was formally named Tun Ismail Atomic Research Centre (PUSPATI).

In 1982, ANM started the operation of TRIGA PUSPATI Reactor (RTP) and the reactor reached its first criticality on 28 June 1982. It's a pool-type nuclear research reactor with its core located at the bottom of a 7 meters deep aluminum tank and surrounded by a biological shield based on high-density concrete. The reactor use enriched uranium and zirconium-hydride (U-ZrH1.6) as its solid fuel elements, while distillation water serves as a neutron coolant and moderator, and graphite serves as a neutron reflector. TRIGA PUSPATI is also the first and only nuclear reactor in Malaysia.

In June 1983, PUSPATI was placed under the patronage of the Prime Minister and was called Nuclear Energy Unit (UTN). It was placed under Ministry of Science, Technology and Environment in October 1990. In August 1994, its name was changed to Malaysian Institute for Nuclear Technology Research (MINT).

On 28 September 2006, following its restructuring, MINT was given a new identity, which is Malaysian Nuclear Agency. Its strategic location, near higher learning institutions. It is in close proximity to the National Administration Centre, Putrajaya, and the Multimedia Super Corridor, Cyberjaya.

The rebranding followed mass restructuring and the re-alignment of its core business towards establishing nuclear power in Malaysia as an alternative form of renewable energy.

== Organisational function ==
ANM functions are to:

- Conduct research and development, services and training in the field of nuclear technology for national development
- Encourage application, transfer and commercialisation of nuclear technology
- Coordinate and manage the national and international nuclear affairs, and act as the liaison agency with International Atomic Energy Agency and Comprehensive Nuclear-Test-Ban Treaty Organization

== See also ==
- Department of Atomic Energy, a Malaysian regulatory body on atomic energy and radioactive materials
- Atomic Energy Licensing Act 1984
