= Ministry of Science, Technology and Innovation (Malaysia) =

Government ministry of Malaysia

- Kementerian Sains, Teknologi dan Inovasi; MOSTI
- Coat of arms of Malaysia

Ministry overview
- Formed: 1973
- Preceding Ministry: Ministry of Energy, Science, Technology, Environment and Climate Change (MESTECC)
- Jurisdiction: Government of Malaysia
- Headquarters: Level 1-7, Block C4 & C5, Complex C, Federal Government Administration, 62662, Putrajaya, Malaysia.
- Annual budget: MYR 1,275,900,600 (2026)
- Minister responsible: Datuk Chang Lih Kang, Minister of Science, Technology and Innovation
- Deputy Minister responsible: Dato' Haji Mohammad Yusof bin Apdal, Deputy Minister of Science, Technology and Innovation
- Ministry executives: Datuk Seri Hj Hasnol Zam Zam bin Hj Ahmad, Secretary-General; Ruziah binti Shafei, Deputy Secretary-General (Planning and Science Acculturation); Norsham binti Abdul Latip, Deputy Secretary-General (Technology Development); Ooli Gunalan Manickam, Senior Under-Secretary (Management)
- Website: www.mosti.gov.my

Footnotes
- Ministry of Science, Technology and Innovation on Facebook

The Ministry of Science, Technology and Innovation (Malay: Kementerian Sains, Teknologi dan Innovatif), abbreviated MOSTI, is a ministry of the Government of Malaysia.

In the Seventh Mahathir cabinet, the entire component of the Ministry of Science, Technology and Innovation (MOSTI), Green Technology and Energy Components from the Ministry of Energy, Green Technology and Water (KeTTHA) and related components of Climate Change and Environment from the Ministry of Natural resources and Environment (NRE) has been restructured and formed the Ministry of Energy, Science, Technology, Environment & Climate Change (MESTECC). After the 2020 Malaysian political crisis, MESTECC has been restructured and its name has been changed to the Ministry of Science, Technology and Innovation (MOSTI) following the formation of the Muhyiddin cabinet. In the Anwar Ibrahim cabinet, the ministry was renamed to Ministry of Science and Technology with the removal of the innovation portfolio from the name.

The current Minister of Science, Technology and Innovation has been Chang Lih Kang since 3 December 2022.

== Organisation ==
- Minister of Science, Technology and Innovation
  - Deputy Minister of Science, Technology and Innovation
    - Secretary-General
      - Under the Authority of Secretary-General
        - International Affairs Unit
        - Internal Audit Unit
        - Legal Unit
        - Integrity Unit
      - Deputy Secretary-General (Planning and Science Acculturation)
        - Strategic Planning Division
        - Malaysia Science, Technology and Information Centre
        - Acculturation and Service Division
        - Space Rule Division
        - National Planetarium
        - National Science Center
      - Deputy Secretary-General (Technology Development)
        - Technology Strategy and S&T Application
        - Technology Transformation and R&D Commercialize
        - Fund Division
        - National Nanotechnology Centre
        - Malaysian Vaccine Development Project Management Office
      - Senior Division Secretary (Management)
        - Human Resources Development Unit
        - Finance Unit
        - Development Unit
        - Account Unit
        - Information Technology Management Unit
        - Administration Unit

== Division and section ==
=== Planning and STI Culturation Sectors ===
- Strategic Planning Division
- Strategic Data and Foresight Technology Division
- Malaysian Science and Technology Information Centre (MASTIC)
- STI and Culturation Services Division
- National Planetarium
- National Science Centre

=== Technology Development, Commercialization and STI Services Sector ===
- Strategic technology and S&T Applications Division
- National Nanotechnology Centre (NNC)
- Commercialization Division
- Fund Division

=== Management Sector ===
- Human Resource Management Division
- Finance Division
- Development Division
- Account Division
- Information Technology Management Division
- Administration Division

=== Divisions & Units under Secretary General ===
- Legal Unit
- Corporate Communication Unit
- Internal Audit Unit
- Integrity Unit
- International Division

== Departments and agencies ==
1. Department of Atomic Energy (LPTA), or Jabatan Tenaga Atom. (Official site)
2. Department of Chemistry Malaysia (JKM), or Jabatan Kimia Malaysia. (Official site)
3. Malaysian Nuclear Agency, or Agensi Nuklear Malaysia. (Official site)
4. Malaysian Space Agency (MYSA), or Agensi Angkasa Malaysia. (Official site)

== Ministers ==
| Minister | Portrait | Office | Executive Experience |
|---|---|---|---|
| Chang Lih Kang | | Minister of Science, Technology and Innovation | MLA for Teja (March 2008 – May 2018); MP for Tanjong Malim (May 2018 – current) |
| Yusof Apdal | | Deputy Minister of Science, Technology and Innovation | MLA for Lahad Datu (May 2013 – May 2018); MP for Lahad Datu (November 2022 – current); Deputy Minister of Higher Education (December 2022 – December 2025); MLA for Silam (November 2025 – current) |

== See also ==
- Minister of Science and Technology (Malaysia)
