= Department of Atomic Energy (Malaysia) =

Malaysian government agency

- Jabatan Tenaga Atom
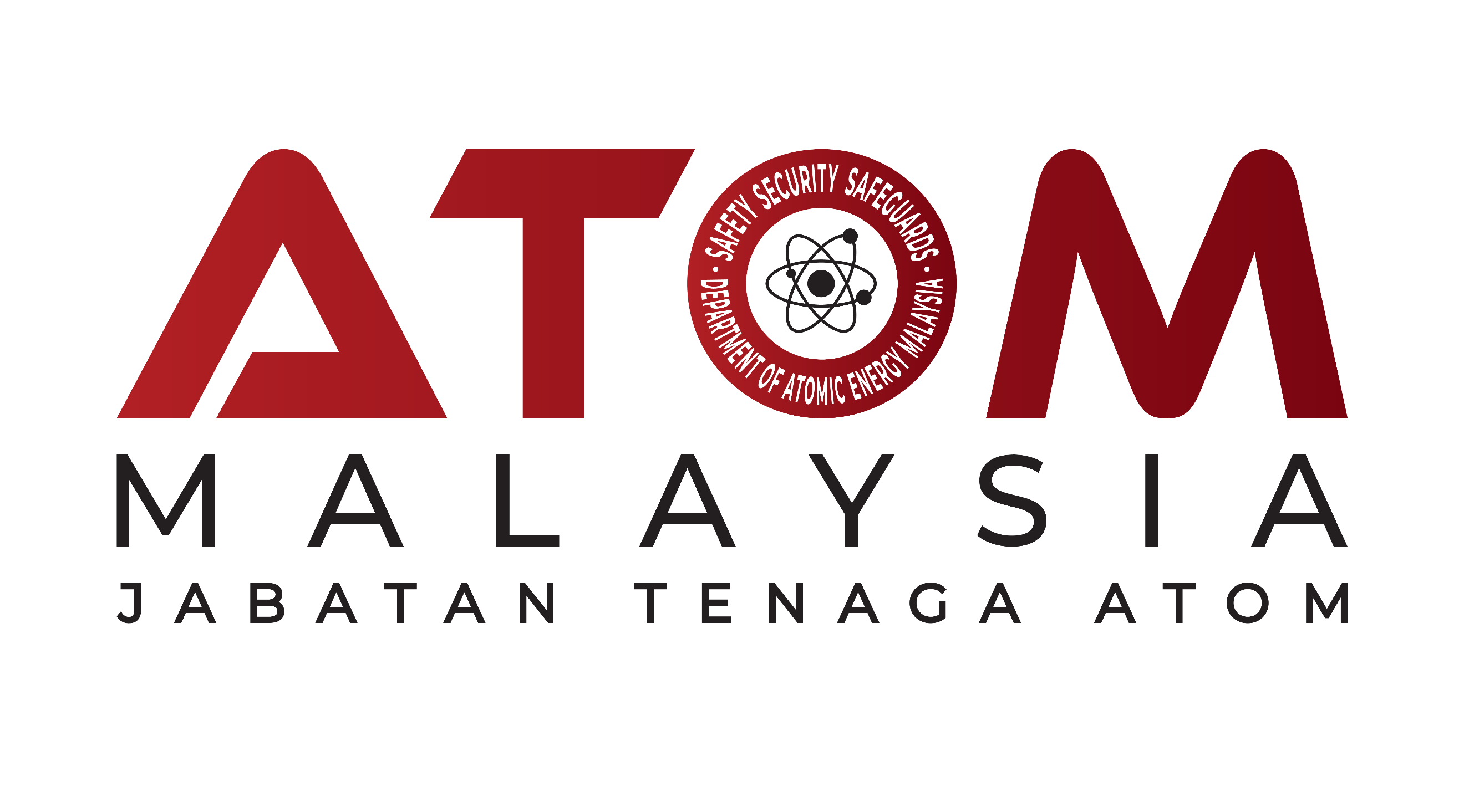

Department overview
- Formed: 1985; 41 years ago
- Preceding department: Atomic Energy Licensing Board (AELB)
- Jurisdiction: Government of Malaysia
- Headquarters: Batu 24, Jalan Dengkil, 43800 Dengkil, Selangor, Malaysia
- Minister responsible: Chang Lih Kang, Minister of Science, Technology and Innovation
- Deputy Minister responsible: Yusof Apdal, Deputy Minister of Science, Technology and Innovation
- Department executive: Hajah Noraishah Pungut, Director General
- Parent department: Ministry of Science, Technology and Innovation
- Key document: Atomic Energy Licensing Act 1984
- Website: www.atom.gov.my

The Department of Atomic Energy Malaysia (Malay: Jabatan Tenaga Atom Malaysia; Atom Malaysia), formerly known as the Atomic Energy Licensing Board (AELB; Malay: Lembaga Perlesenan Tenaga Atom), is a government agency under the Ministry of Science, Technology and Innovation (MOSTI) that is responsible for the regulation of atomic energy activities in Malaysia as stipulated in the Atomic Energy Licensing Act 1984 (Act 304).

Atom Malaysia is a regulatory authority that operates from its headquarters in Dengkil, Selangor and its four branches in Penang (relocated to Kedah in October 2022), Johor, Terengganu and Sarawak, all of which are responsible in licensing processes and enforcement activities related to radioactivity and atomic energy. Atom Malaysia is led by a Director General, which is currently held by Hjh. Noraishah binti Pungut.

In June 2022, the Public Service Department (JPA) of Malaysia approved the name change from AELB to Atom Malaysia. The name change took effect on that date, rebranding the agency from AELB to the Department of Atomic Energy (Atom Malaysia).

== Establishment ==
Control over the use of radioactive substances began in 1968, when Parliament passed the Radioactive Substances Act 1968. Due to the rapid development and utilization of atomic energy activities in Malaysia, in which requires more effective regulatory control, inspection and enforcement, the Atomic Energy Licensing Bill was drafted. This bill was then passed in Parliament in April 1984, as the Atomic Energy Licensing Act (Act 304). In line with Section 3 of the Act 304, Atomic Energy Licensing Board (AELB) was established under the Prime Minister's Department on 1 February 1985. AELB acts as an enforcement authority for the implementation of the Act. However, on 27 October 1990, AELB was then placed under the Ministry of Science, Technology and Innovation.

Today in 2022, AELB is renamed to be the Department of Atomic Energy (Atom Malaysia) due to the fact that since its establishment in 1985, this department is not known to have a name of its own. The Atomic Energy Licensing Board, whereby the "Board" by all definition only refers to the 5 board members. At the same time the Director General of this department also acts as an Executive Secretary to this Board.

== Objectives ==
To ensure all atomic energy activities are safe, secured and safeguarded (3S's) for protecting the public, workers and environment.

=== Mission ===
To regulate the use of atomic energy for nation's wealth and well being.

=== Vision ===
An effective regulatory body for safety, security and safeguards in atomic energy activities.

== Functions ==
Atom Malaysia's functions as set forth in Act 304 are as follows:

To advise the Ministers and the Government of Malaysia on matters relating to the Atomic Energy Licensing Act 1984 and the progress of its development, particularly on the implications of the development for Malaysia.

- controlling and monitoring the activity of atomic energy and the matters incidental thereto;

- to establish, maintain and develop scientific cooperation with any body, institution or other organization relating to nuclear matters or atomic energy as the Board deems fit for the purposes of the Atomic Energy Licensing Act 1984;

- where so directed by the Government of Malaysia, to implement or provide for the execution of obligations arising out of agreements, conventions or treaties relating to nuclear or atomic matters of which Malaysia is a party if the treaty, convention or treaty is connected with the purpose - the Atomic Energy Licensing Act 1984; and

- to do other matters arising or arising out of the functions of this Board under the Atomic Energy Licensing Act 1984 which is not contrary to the meaning of the Act, whether directed or not directed by the Minister.
