= Friston How =

British civil servant

Sir Friston Charles How, CB (17 September 1897 – 15 January 1990) was a British senior civil servant.

== Biography ==
How was born on 17 September 1897, the only child of Charles Friston How, of Leytonstone, and his wife, Jane Ethel How. After attending Leyton County High School for Boys, he went to the University of London, graduating with a Bachelor of Science degree (BSc) in 1917.

He entered the Honourable Artillery Company in 1916 and was commissioned into the Royal Marines the following year, serving out the remainder of World War I in France.

In 1920, How joined the Exchequer and Audit Department, and became one of His Majesty's Inspectors of Taxes until 1937. In the meantime, he was called to the bar at the Middle Temple in 1927. He was posted in the Air Ministry between 1937 and 1940, and then the Ministry of Aircraft Production until 1945, when he joined the Ministry of Supply. In 1954, he was appointed Secretary of the Atomic Energy Office, serving until 1959, when he retired.

The Office had been established in 1954 to assist the Prime Minister and Lord President of the Council in discharging their duties with regards to atomic energy, but was disbanded in 1959 and its functions merged into the Office of the Minister for Science. While retired from the Civil Service, he was a member of the Air Transport Advisory Council from 1960 to 1961 and a member of the Air Transport Licensing Board from 1960 to 1970.

== Personal life ==
He was appointed a Companion of the Order of the Bath (CB) in 1948 and a Knight Bachelor in 1958. He had married Ann Stewart, daughter of Alexander Chisholm Hunter of Aberdeen, in 1932; they had no children and she died in 1985. Sir Friston How died, aged 92, on 15 January 1990, having retired to live in Aberdeenshire.

Other offices
Preceded by Office established	Secretary, Atomic Energy Office; Under-Secretary: M. I. Michaels; 1954–1959	Succeeded by Office abolished
