= Fong Po Kuan =

Malaysian politician

- 冯宝君

Member of the Malaysian Parliament for Batu Gajah
- In office 29 November 1999 – 5 May 2013
- Preceded by: Yeong Chee Wah (BN–MCA)
- Succeeded by: Sivakumar Varatharaju Naidu (PR–DAP)
- Majority: 2,071 (1999); 8,033 (2004); 24,627 (2008)

Personal details
- Born: 15 September 1973 (age 53) Perak, Malaysia
- Party: Democratic Action Party (DAP)
- Other political affiliations: Barisan Alternatif (BA) (1999–2004); Pakatan Rakyat (PR) (2008–2015); Pakatan Harapan (PH) (since 2015)
- Spouse: Tan Chen Choon (陈正春)
- Occupation: Politician
- Website: pokuan.blogsome.com

Fong Po Kuan (simplified Chinese: 冯宝君; traditional Chinese: 馮寶君; pinyin: Féng Bǎojūn; Jyutping: fung4 bou2 gwan1; born 15 September 1973) is a Malaysian politician from the Democratic Action Party (DAP) political party. She is able to communicate in Chinese, English, and Malay.

== Education ==
She did her STPM in Anglo Chinese School, Ipoh in 1992. After that, she attended the International Islamic University Malaysia (IIUM) from 1993 to 1997, and graduated with a law degree.

== Political career ==
In the 1999 general election, Fong won the Batu Gajah parliamentary seat in the Dewan Rakyat, and became the youngest female Member of Parliament (MP) in Malaysia. She won 19,867 out of 38,774 votes, winning by a majority of 2,071 with 67.5% turnout. During her first term, she was suspended for six months from Parliament without wages or allowances for criticising the Speaker of the Dewan Rakyat. Her suspension was unique in that the Speaker had waived the seven-day notice period required to raise the issue, and that the matter was never brought to the Parliamentary Committee of Privileges. The 83 MPs, all from the Speaker's party, who voted for suspension only constituted 43% of parliament; while this was a majority of those present in the hall, it did not have a simple majority of the total number of MPs. The suspension was widely seen to be vindictive.

In 2003, Fong inquired in parliament why she had been compelled to wear the tudung for her graduation ceremony at IIUM. The Parliamentary Secretary of the Ministry of Education, Mahadzir Mohd Khir, stated wearing the tudung was encouraged but not mandatory. A year later, the IIUM Senate made it compulsory for female students to wear the tudung to their convocation ceremony.

In 2005, having noticed a few non-Muslim women wearing the tudung in the gallery, she raised a point of order about whether wearing the tudung was compulsory in Parliament. It was not.

Fong initially decided not to defend her seat in the 2008 general election. After DAP leaders asked her to reconsider, she finally agreed to run for re-election, retaining her Batu Gajah parliamentary seat for the third term with a majority of 24,627.

== Election results ==
Parliament of Malaysia
Year	Constituency	Candidate	Votes	Pct	Opponent(s)	Votes	Pct	Ballots cast	Majority	Turnout
1999	P063 Batu Gajah	Fong Po Kuan (DAP)	19,867	51.24%	Yeong Chee Wah (MCA)	17,796	45.89%	38,774	2,071	65.68%
1999	P063 Batu Gajah	Fong Po Kuan (DAP)	19,867	51.24%	Yang Kar Ming (MDP)	186	0.49%	38,774	2,071	65.68%
2004	P066 Batu Gajah	Fong Po Kuan (DAP)	28,847	56.62%	Ong Ka Chuan (MCA)	20,814	40.84%	50,952	8,033	69.66%
2008	P066 Batu Gajah	Fong Po Kuan (DAP)	39,922	70.95%	Cheah Yoke Can (MCA)	15,295	27.18%	56,270	24,627	72.78%

== Personal life ==
Fong, 35, married Johor DAP organising secretary Tan Chen Choon, 38, on 12 January 2008 then. They organised a quiet wedding ceremony solemnised by Ipoh Chin Woo Association's assistant registrar Datuk Ooi Foh Sing. Her husband, Tan later became Johor State Assemblyman for Jementah in 2013 and 2018 general elections and also appointed as Johor's EXCO in 2019.
