= Ng Kor Sim =

Malaysian politician

Yang Berhormat Ng Kor Sim
- 黄炣卿

Member of the Johor State Legislative Assembly for Jementah
- In office 12 March 2022 – 11 July 2026
- Preceded by: Tan Chen Choon (PH–DAP)
- Succeeded by: See Ann Giap (BN–MCA)
- Majority: 714 (2022)

Personal details
- Born: Ng Kor Sim
- Citizenship: Malaysian
- Party: Democratic Action Party (DAP)
- Other political affiliations: Pakatan Harapan (PH)
- Occupation: Politician

Ng Kor Sim is a Malaysian politician who served as the Member of the Johor State Legislative Assembly (MLA) for Jementah from March 2022 to July 2026. She is a member of the Democratic Action Party (DAP), a component party of the Pakatan Harapan (PH) coalition.

== Career ==
Before entering elected office, Ng was involved in Junior Chamber International (JCI), including as secretary general of JCI Muar in 2015, president of JCI Bandar Segamat in 2018, and director of public relations of JCI Malaysia in 2019.

In October 2024, Ng was elected treasurer of DAP Johor for the 2024–2027 term.

== Election results ==
Johor State Legislative Assembly
Year	Constituency	Candidate	Votes	Pct.	Opponent(s)	Votes	Pct.	Ballots cast	Majority	Turnout
2022	N02 Jementah	Ng Kor Sim (DAP)	8,877	40.92%	See Ann Giap (MCA)	8,163	37.63%	22,146	714	53.73%
2022	N02 Jementah	Ng Kor Sim (DAP)	8,877	40.92%	Maimunah Safwa Musa (PAS)	4,654	21.45%	22,146	714	53.73%
2026	N02 Jementah	Ng Kor Sim (DAP)	11,609	42.94%	See Ann Giap (MCA)	12,522	46.31%	27,038	913	65.73%
2026	N02 Jementah	Ng Kor Sim (DAP)	11,609	42.94%	Saifullah Abdul Wahab (PAS)	2,907	10.75%	27,038	913	65.73%
