= Atomic Energy Act 1984 =

Malaysian law that governs the use of atomic energy and nuclear materials

Parliament of Malaysia
- Long title: An Act to provide for the regulation and control over activities involving atomic energy, for adequate protection for the public and the environment from the harmful effects of activities involving atomic energy, the safety of activities involving atomic energy and security of radioactive material, nuclear material and facilities, the application of relevant measures for safeguards and liability for nuclear damage, and to provide for related matters.
- Citation: Act 304
- Territorial extent: Malaysia
- Passed by: Dewan Rakyat
- Passed: 6 April 1984
- Passed by: Dewan Negara
- Passed: 25 April 1984
- Royal assent: 27 June 1984
- Commenced: 1 February 1985 [P.U. (B) 44/1985]

Legislative history

Initiating chamber: Dewan Rakyat
- Introduced by: Abdullah Ahmad Badawi - Minister in the Prime Minister's Department
- First reading: 13 March 1984
- Second reading: 6 April 1984
- Third reading: 6 April 1984

Revising chamber: Dewan Negara
- Member(s) in charge: Abdullah Ahmad Badawi - Minister in the Prime Minister's Department
- First reading: 9 April 1984
- Second reading: 25 April 1984
- Third reading: 25 April 1984

Repeals
- Radioactive Substances Act 1968 [Act 17 of 1968]

Amended by
- Atomic Energy Licensing (Amendment) Act 2025 [Act A1779]

Related legislation
- Strategic Trade Act 2010

Keywords
- Atomic energy, Atomic Energy Licensing Board, Nuclear material, Radioactive material
- Status: In force

Atomic Energy Act 1984 (Malay: Akta Tenaga Atom 1984), formerly known as Atomic Energy Licensing Act 1984, is the main legislation that governs the use of atomic energy and nuclear materials in Malaysia. It also established the Atomic Energy Licensing Board (AELB) (Note: Now Department of Atomic Energy of Malaysia (Atom Malaysia) since June 2022.), which oversees the regulation and licensing of nuclear installation, radioactive material, nuclear material, and irradiating apparatus in Malaysia.

== History ==
In the 1960s, radiation and radioisotopes began to gain considerable utilization in the fields of research, engineering and medicine in Malaysia, particularly the use of X-ray in public and private healthcare facilities. This prompted the government to pass the Radioactive Substances Act 1968 to regulate their uses.

However, after Malaysia's accession to the International Atomic Energy Agency (IAEA) in 1969 and the construction of the TRIGA PUSPATI research reactor in Bangi in 1972, use of radition and radioisotopes in various fields increased significantly and the Malaysian government deemed the Radioactive Substances Act 1968 no longer be able to provide an adequate regulatory framework to control the use of atomic energy and nuclear materials.

Hence, the Atomic Energy Licensing Act 1984 was proposed and passed by the Dewan Rakyat on 6 April 1984, and by the Dewan Negara on 25 April the same year. On 1 February 1985, the Act fully came into force.

The Act remain unamended for 41 years until 2025, where a major amendment was passed to broaden the regulatory framework under the Act in compliance with international standards, and to explicitly ban the use and manufacturing of nuclear weapons. The amendment, which partially came into force on 1 December 2025, also provide a new regulatory framework for future adoption of nuclear power in Malaysia, but the government indicated that Malaysia will only decide on its adoption after 2030.

== Legal provisions ==
This Act is divided into 13 parts and one schedule, as follows:

- Part I: Preliminary
- ~~Part II: Atomic Energy Licensing Board~~ (repealed)
- Part IIA: Atomic Energy Advisory Council
- Part III: Control and Licensing
- Part IV: Cancellation, Suspension and Renewal of Licenses and Permits
- Part V: Health and Safety
- Part VA: Security
- Part VB: Safeguards
- Part VI: Decommissioning and Management of Radioactive Waste and Spent Fuel
- Part VII: Appeals
- Part VIII: Inspection and Enforcement
- Part VIIIA: Offences Relating to Security
- Part IX: Liability for Nuclear Damage
- Part X: General
- Schedule

=== Licensing ===
Under Section 15 and 16 of the Act, the AELB handles the licensing of all non-medical-related nuclear activities, while the licensing power of medical-related nuclear activities or apparatus is delegated to the Director General of Health under the Health Ministry.
