= Sandrea Ng Shy Ching =

Malaysian politician

Yang Berhormat Dato' Sandrea Ng Shy Ching DPMP MLA
- 黄诗情

Member of the Perak State Executive Council
- Incumbent
- Assumed office 22 November 2022
- Monarch: Nazrin Shah
- Menteri Besar: Saarani Mohamad
- Portfolio: Housing and Local Government (Note: Assumed portfolios on 23 November 2022 taking office.)
- Preceded by: Nolee Ashilin Mohammed Radzi (Housing, Local Government}
- Constituency: Teja

Member of the Perak State Legislative Assembly for Teja
- Incumbent
- Assumed office 9 May 2018
- Preceded by: Chang Lih Kang (PH–PKR)
- Majority: 4,390 (2018); 4,555 (2022)

Personal details
- Born: Sandrea Ng Shy Ching
- Citizenship: Malaysian
- Party: PKR
- Other political affiliations: Pakatan Harapan (PH); Barisan Nasional (BN) (aligned:since 2022)
- Education: Universiti Putra Malaysia 2003-2006
- Occupation: Politician

Chinese name
- Traditional Chinese: 黃詩情
- Simplified Chinese: 黄诗情
Transcriptions
Standard Mandarin
- Hanyu Pinyin: Huáng Shīqíng
Yue: Cantonese
- Jyutping: Wong4 Si1 Cing4
Southern Min
- Hokkien POJ: N̂g Si-chêng
- Tâi-lô: N̂g Si-tsîng

Sandrea Ng Shy Ching is a Malaysian politician who has served as Member of the Perak State Executive Council (EXCO) in the Barisan Nasional (BN) state administration under Menteri Besar Saarani Mohamad since November 2022 and Member of the Perak State Legislative Assembly (MLA) for Teja since May 2018. She is a member of the People's Justice Party (PKR), a component party of the Pakatan Harapan (PH) coalition. She is the Deputy Communication Director, Women Deputy Chief and Women Treasurer of PKR of Perak.

== Election results ==
Perak State Legislative Assembly
Year	Constituency	Candidate	Votes	Pct.	Opponent(s)	Votes	Pct.	Ballots cast	Majority	Turnout
2018	N46 Teja	Sandrea Ng Shy Ching (PKR)	10,546	55.13%	Albert Chang Chun Cheun (MCA)	6,156	32.18%	19,131	4,390	78.94%
2018	N46 Teja	Sandrea Ng Shy Ching (PKR)	10,546	55.13%	Mokthar Abdullah (PAS)	2,028	10.60%	19,131	4,390	78.94%
2022	N46 Teja	Sandrea Ng Shy Ching (PKR)	10,814	46.50%	Liew Yee Lin (MCA)	6,259	26.91%	23,257	4,555	70.54%
2022	N46 Teja	Sandrea Ng Shy Ching (PKR)	10,814	46.50%	Ahmad Ishak (BERSATU)	5,794	24.91%	23,257	4,555	70.54%
2022	N46 Teja	Sandrea Ng Shy Ching (PKR)	10,814	46.50%	Aswannudin Hariffudin (PEJUANG)	214	0.92%	23,257	4,555	70.54%
2022	N46 Teja	Sandrea Ng Shy Ching (PKR)	10,814	46.50%	Low Leong Sin (WARISAN)	176	0.76%	23,257	4,555	70.54%

== Honours ==
- Perak
  - Knight Commander of the Order of the Perak State Crown (DPMP) – Dato' (2026)
