= Loke Yuen Yow =

Malaysian politician

Yang Berbahagia Dato' Loke Yuen Yow DPMP AMP JP
- 陆垠佑

Deputy Minister of Youth and Sports
- In office 8 May 1995 – 14 December 1999
- Monarchs: Ja'afar; Salahuddin
- Prime Minister: Mahathir Mohamad
- Minister: Muhyiddin Yassin
- Preceded by: Teng Gaik Kwan
- Succeeded by: Ong Tee Keat
- Constituency: Tanjong Malim

Deputy Minister of Finance II
- In office 14 August 1989 – 3 May 1995 Serving with Wan Abu Bakar Wan Mohamad (1987–1990); Abdul Ghani Othman (1990–1993); Mustapa Mohamed (1993–1995) (Deputy Minister of Finance I)
- Monarchs: Azlan Shah; Ja'afar
- Prime Minister: Mahathir Mohamad
- Minister: Daim Zainuddin (1986–1991); Anwar Ibrahim (1991–1995)
- Preceded by: Ng Cheng Kiat
- Succeeded by: Wong See Wah
- Constituency: Tanjong Malim

Member of the Malaysian Parliament for Tanjong Malim
- In office 3 August 1986 – 8 March 2008
- Preceded by: Mak Hon Kam (BN–MCA)
- Succeeded by: Ong Ka Chuan (BN–MCA)
- Majority: 10,698 (1986); 15,246 (1990); 20,664 (1995); 11,222 (1999); 14,693 (2004)

Personal details
- Born: 10 September 1952 (age 74)
- Party: Malaysian Chinese Association (MCA)
- Other political affiliations: Barisan Nasional (BN)

Loke Yuen Yow (Chinese: 陆垠佑; pinyin: Lù Yín Yòu; born 10 September 1952) is a Malaysian politician. He was the Member of Parliament (MP) for Tanjong Malim from August 1986 to March 2008 and Deputy Minister of Youth and Sports during 1995–1999 in Mahathir Mohamad cabinet. His biggest achievement in Ministry of Youth and Sports is the organization of 1998 Commonwealth Games led by the minister Muhyiddin Yassin.

== Politics ==
=== Proposal to appoint President of MCA as second Deputy Prime Minister ===
He proposed to the then Prime Minister, Najib Tun Razak to establish a Deputy Prime Minister II post and appoint a Malaysian Chinese for the post as a sign of power sharing in 2009.

== Election results ==
Perak State Legislative Assembly
Year	Constituency	Candidate	Votes	Pct	Opponent(s)	Votes	Pct	Ballots cast	Majority	Turnout
1982	N20 Gopeng	Loke Yuen Yow (MCA)								

Parliament of Malaysia
Year	Constituency	Candidate	Votes	Pct	Opponent(s)	Votes	Pct	Ballot cast	Majority	Turnout
1986	P071 Tanjong Malim	Loke Yuen Yow (MCA)	18,693	62.65%	Liew Fatt Yuen (DAP)	7,995	26.80%	29,836	10,698	69.45%
1986	P071 Tanjong Malim	Loke Yuen Yow (MCA)	18,693	62.65%	Ho Shing Chong @ Ghazali Ho (PAS)	2,464	8.26%	29,836	10,698	69.45%
1990	P071 Tanjong Malim	Loke Yuen Yow (MCA)	23,953	70.54%	Abdul Rahim Mat Taib (DAP)	8,707	25.64%	33,956	15,246	69.82%
1995	P074 Tanjong Malim	Loke Yuen Yow (MCA)	25,752	80.70%	Wan Mokhtar Wan Endut (S46)	5,088	15.94%	31,910	20,664	60.90%
1999	P074 Tanjong Malim	Loke Yuen Yow (MCA)	22,150	64.11%	Ng Lum Yong (keADILan)	10,928	31.63%	34,549	11,222	63.17%
2004	P077 Tanjong Malim	Loke Yuen Yow (MCA)	24,283	68.84%	Shamsuddin Abdul Rahman (PKR)	9,590	27.19%	35,273	14,693	66.88%

== Honours ==
- Perak
  - Knight Commander of the Order of the Perak State Crown (DPMP) – Dato' (1989)
  - Member of the Order of the Perak State Crown (AMP) (1986)
  - Justice of the Peace (JP) (2002)
