= Tan Chen Choon =

Malaysian Politician

- 陈正春

Exco roles (Johor)
- 2019–2020: Chairman of the Local Government, Urban Wellbeing and Environment

Faction represented in Johor State Legislative Assembly
- 2013–2018: Democratic Action Party
- 2018–2022: Pakatan Harapan

Personal details
- Born: 5 January 1970 (age 56) Johor, Malaysia
- Citizenship: Malaysian
- Party: Democratic Action Party (DAP)
- Other political affiliations: Pakatan Rakyat (PR) (2008–2015); Pakatan Harapan (PH) (since 2015)
- Spouse: Fong Po Kuan
- Occupation: Politician

Tan Chen Choon is a Malaysian politician who served as Member of the Johor State Executive Council (EXCO) in the Pakatan Harapan (PH) state administration under former Menteri Besar Sahruddin Jamal from April 2019 to the collapse of the PH state administration in February 2020 and Member of the Johor State Legislative Assembly (MLA) for Jementah from May 2013 to March 2022. He is also the husband of former Member of Parliament (MP) for Batu Gajah Fong Po Kuan. He is a member of the Democratic Action Party (DAP), a component party of the Pakatan Harapan (PH) opposition coalition.

== Election results ==
Johor State Legislative Assembly
Year	Constituency	Candidate	Votes	Pct	Opponent(s)	Votes	Pct	Ballots cast	Majority	Turnout%
2004	N12 Bentayan	Tan Chen Choon (DAP)	7,229	48.56%	Lau Yee Wee (MCA)	7,657	51.44%	15,562	428	72.00%
2013	N02 Jementah	Tan Chen Choon (DAP)	12,781	54.70%	Lee Hong Tee (MCA)	10,585	45.30%	23,794	2,196	84.40%
2018	N02 Jementah	Tan Chen Choon (DAP)	16,336	59.07%	Chiam Yok Meng (MCA)	9,335	33.75%	28,296	7,001	83.60%
2018	N02 Jementah	Tan Chen Choon (DAP)	16,336	59.07%	Khairul Faizi Ahmad Kamil (PAS)	1,986	7.18%	28,296	7,001	83.60%
