= Ong Ka Chuan =

Malaysian politician

Yang Berbahagia Tan Sri Dato' Seri Ong Ka Chuan PSM SPMP DPMP PMP
- 黄家泉

Second Minister of International Trade and Industry
- In office 29 July 2015 – 9 May 2018 Serving with Mustapa Mohamed
- Monarchs: Abdul Halim; Muhammad V
- Prime Minister: Najib Razak
- Deputy: Lee Chee Leong (2015–2016); Ahmad Maslan; Chua Tee Yong (2016–2018)
- Preceded by: Position Established
- Succeeded by: Position Abolished
- Constituency: Tanjong Malim

Minister of Housing and Local Government
- In office 19 March 2008 – 9 April 2009
- Monarch: Mizan Zainal Abidin
- Prime Minister: Abdullah Ahmad Badawi
- Deputy: Hamzah Zainudin; Robert Lau Hoi Chew
- Preceded by: Ong Ka Ting
- Succeeded by: Kong Cho Ha
- Constituency: Tanjong Malim

Secretary-General of the Malaysian Chinese Association
- In office 2 January 2014 – 16 November 2018
- President: Liow Tiong Lai
- Deputy: Wee Jeck Seng
- Preceded by: Kong Cho Ha
- Succeeded by: Chew Mei Fun
- Constituency: Tanjong Malim
- In office 30 August 2005 – 11 November 2008
- President: Ong Ka Ting; Ong Tee Keat
- Deputy: Wong Kam Hoong
- Preceded by: Ting Chew Peh
- Succeeded by: Wong Foon Meng
- Constituency: Tanjong Malim

Member of the Malaysian Parliament for Tanjong Malim
- In office 8 March 2008 – 9 May 2018
- Preceded by: Loke Yuen Yow (BN–MCA)
- Succeeded by: Chang Lih Kang (PH–PKR)
- Majority: 5,422 (2008); 4,328 (2013)

Member of the Perak State Legislative Assembly for Chenderiang
- In office 3 August 1986 – 21 March 2004
- Preceded by: Chan Kon You (BN–MCA)
- Succeeded by: Look Kuan @ Look Kok Kong (BN–MCA)
- Majority: 3,929 (1986); 5,931 (1990); 6,311 (1995); 3,557 (1999)

Personal details
- Born: 29 May 1954 (age 72) Lenggong, Perak, Federation of Malaya (now Malaysia)
- Party: Malaysian Chinese Association (MCA)
- Other political affiliations: Barisan Nasional (BN); Perikatan Nasional (PN)
- Spouse: Chan Beng Choo
- Relations: Elder brother of Ong Ka Ting
- Children: 2
- Education: University of Malaya
- Occupation: Politician
- Profession: Teacher

Ong Ka Chuan (simplified Chinese: 黄家泉; traditional Chinese: 黃家泉; pinyin: Huáng Jiāquán; Pe̍h-ōe-jī: N̂g Ka-chôan; born 29 May 1954) is a Malaysian politician and was the Member of Parliament for Tanjung Malim, Perak from March 2008 to May 2018. Ong was the secretary-general for twice for the Malaysian Chinese Association (MCA), a component party of the Barisan Nasional coalition. The first time he was elected by the 7th MCA President Ong Ka Ting who is also his younger brother on 30 August 2005 and the second time by the 10th MCA President Liow Tiong Lai on 2 January 2014.

Ong was the Second Minister for International Trade and Industry from 2015 to 2018. Formerly he was the Minister of Housing and Local Government from 2008 to 2009.

== Early and personal life ==
Ong was born on 29 May 1954 in Lenggong, Perak. He graduated from the University of Malaya (UM) and worked as a school teacher before entering politics. He is married to Chan Beng Choo and the couple has two children.

MCA former President Ong Ka Ting, is his younger brother.

== Political career ==
Ong was a member of the Perak State Legislative Assembly for Chenderiang for four terms from 1986 to 2004, before contesting the federal seat of Batu Gajah in the 2004 general election. He lost to Fong Poh Kuan of the Democratic Action Party (DAP), despite the Barisan Nasional coalition making widespread gains nationwide. Despite this, he was appointed MCA secretary-general the following year and served concurrently with his brother Ong Ka Ting as president.

In the 2008 general elections, Ong contested and won the Tanjung Malim parliamentary seat. He was appointed Minister of Housing and Local Government. Later that year, Ong contested the MCA deputy presidency but lost to Chua Soi Lek, and was immediately removed as secretary-general by new president Ong Tee Keat. In 2009, he was dropped from the Cabinet by incoming Prime Minister Najib Razak.

In the 2013 general elections, Ong successfully defended his parliamentary seat despite MCA suffered its worst electoral result in its history. As a result of MCA poor performance and its previously passed resolution not to take up cabinet posts in the government if it failed in the 13th general election, MCA will not take up any government position. Later in 2013, MCA elected Liow Tiong Lai as the new president and reversed its resolution. Liow appointed Ong as new MCA secretary-general for the second time then. In 2015, Najib Razak in a cabinet reshuffle eventually appointed Ong as the Second Minister for International Trade and Industry.

He was dropped as a candidate for the Tanjong Malim constituency in the 2018 election.

== Election results ==
Perak State Legislative Assembly
Year	Constituency	Candidate	Votes	Pct	Opponent(s)	Votes	Pct	Ballots cast	Majority	Turnout
1986	N35 Chenderiang	Ong Ka Chuan (MCA)	7,754	63.59%	Aw Too Yen (DAP)	3,825	31.37%	12,194	3,929	66.99%
1990	N35 Chenderiang	Ong Ka Chuan (MCA)	9,482	68.32%	Shelvarajah Ponniah (DAP)	3,551	25.59%	13,879	5,931	66.59%
1995	N40 Chenderiang	Ong Ka Chuan (MCA)	8,582	72.67%	Harikrishnan Vellapan (DAP)	2,271	19.23%	11,809	6,311	62.41%
1995	N40 Chenderiang	Ong Ka Chuan (MCA)	8,582	72.67%	Foo Koon Yow (IND)	168	1.42%	11,809	6,311	62.41%
1999	N40 Chenderiang	Ong Ka Chuan (MCA)	7,168	58.79%	Mahinder Singh (keADILan)	3,611	29.62%	12,192	3,557	60.63%

Parliament of Malaysia
Year	Constituency	Candidate	Votes	Pct	Opponent(s)	Votes	Pct	Ballots cast	Majority	Turnout
2004	P066 Batu Gajah	Ong Ka Chuan (MCA)	20,814	40.85%	Fong Po Kuan (DAP)	28,847	56.62%	50,952	8,033	69.66%
2008	P077 Tanjong Malim	Ong Ka Chuan (MCA)	21,016	55.15%	Mohamad Azman Marjohan (PKR)	15,594	40.92%	38,107	5,422	71.25%
2013	P077 Tanjong Malim	Ong Ka Chuan (MCA)	28,225	52.86%	Tan Yee Kew (PKR)	23,897	44.75%	53,399	4,328	82.80%

== Honours ==
- Malaysia
  - Commander of the Order of Loyalty to the Crown of Malaysia (PSM) – Tan Sri (2022)
- Perak
  - Knight Grand Commander of the Order of the Perak State Crown (SPMP) – Dato' Seri (2008)
  - Knight Commander of the Order of the Perak State Crown (DPMP) – Dato' (1990)
  - Commander of the Order of the Perak State Crown (PMP) (1987)
