= Tanjong Malim (federal constituency) =

Federal constituency in Perak, Malaysia

Tanjong Malim (P077)
Perak constituency

Federal constituency
- Legislature: Dewan Rakyat
- MP: Chang Lih Kang; PH
- Constituency created: 1958
- First contested: 1959
- Last contested: 2022

Demographics
- Population (2020): 122,947
- Electors (2022): 93,873
- Area (km²): 1,882
- Pop. density (per km²): 65.3

Tanjong Malim is a federal constituency in Batang Padang District and Muallim District, Perak, Malaysia, that has been represented in the Dewan Rakyat since 1959.

The federal constituency was created in the 1958 redistribution and is mandated to return a single member to the Dewan Rakyat under the first past the post voting system.

== Demographics ==
Ethnic breakdown of Tanjong Malim's electorate as of 2022
1. Malay (55.0%)
2. Chinese (23.6%)
3. Indian (13.0%)
4. Other ethnicities (8.40%)

As of 2020, Tanjong Malim has a population of 122,947 people.

Age breakdown of Tanjong Malim's electorate as of 2022
1. 18–20 (5.49%)
2. 21–29 (19.4%)
3. 30–39 (23.6%)
4. 40–49 (18.0%)
5. 50–59 (12.8%)
6. 60–69 (11.3%)
7. 70–79 (6.91%)
8. 80–89 (2.02%)
9. above 90 (0.50%)
Gender breakdown of Tanjong Malim's electorate as of 2022
1. Male (50.2%)
2. Female (49.8%)

== History ==
=== Polling districts ===
According to the federal gazette issued on 31 October 2022, the Tanjong Malim constituency is divided into 49 polling districts.

State constituency	Polling districts	Code	Location
Sungkai (N57)	Pos Gedong	077/57/01	SK Pos Gedong
Sungkai (N57)	Jalan Bruseh	077/57/02	SK Bidor; SK Kampung Senta
Sungkai (N57)	Bidor Tengah	077/57/03	SJK (C) Choong Hua (1)
Sungkai (N57)	Bidor Baharu	077/57/04	SK Seri Bidor
Sungkai (N57)	Pekan Bidor	077/57/05	SMK Syeikh Abdul Ghani
Sungkai (N57)	Bidor Barat	077/57/06	SMK Choong Hua
Sungkai (N57)	Bidor Station Utara	077/57/07	SJK (C) Pin Min
Sungkai (N57)	Kampong Bahru Jalan Sungkai	077/57/08	SMK Syeikh Abdul Gahni
Sungkai (N57)	Pekan Pasir	077/57/09	SJK (C) Pekan Pasir
Sungkai (N57)	Bikam	077/57/10	SK Bikam
Sungkai (N57)	Kampong Baharu Bikam	077/57/11	SJK (C) Kuala Bikam
Sungkai (N57)	Sungkai	077/57/12	SMK Sungkai
Sungkai (N57)	Pekan Sungkai	077/57/13	SMK Sungkai
Sungkai (N57)	Buloh Telor	077/57/14	SMK Sungkai
Slim (N58)	Ladang Sungkai	077/58/01	SJK (T) Ladang Sungkai
Slim (N58)	Pekan Lama	077/58/02	SK Changkat Sulaiman
Slim (N58)	Changkat Sulaiman	077/58/03	SK Changkat Sulaiman
Slim (N58)	Trolak Utara	077/58/04	SK Trolak Utara
Slim (N58)	Trolak Selatan	077/58/05	SK Trolak Selatan
Slim (N58)	Trolak	077/58/06	SJK (T) Trolak
Slim (N58)	Pekan Slim	077/58/07	SK Slim River
Slim (N58)	Sungai Slim Utara	077/58/08	SK Aminuddin Bakri
Slim (N58)	Kampong Kuala Slim	077/58/09	SK Kuala Slim
Slim (N58)	Ladang Kepala Bali	077/58/10	SJK (T) Ldg Kelapa Bali
Slim (N58)	FELDA Gunong Besout I	077/58/11	SK Besout 3; SMK (FELDA) Besout
Slim (N58)	FELDA Gunong Besout II	077/58/12	SK Seri Besout
Slim (N58)	FELDA Gunong Besout V	077/58/13	SK Besout 5; SK Besout 4
Behrang (N59)	Kampong Poh	077/59/01	SK Kampong Poh
Behrang (N59)	Perlok	077/59/02	SK Perlok; SK Jernang
Behrang (N59)	Pos Tenau	077/59/03	SK Pos Tenau
Behrang (N59)	Klah	077/59/04	SK FELDA Sungai Kelah
Behrang (N59)	Trolak Timur	077/59/05	SK Trolak Timur
Behrang (N59)	Pos Bersih	077/59/06	SK Pos Bersih
Behrang (N59)	Ulu Slim	077/59/07	SK Ulu Slim
Behrang (N59)	Slim Village	077/59/08	SJK (C) Ho Pin
Behrang (N59)	Kampong Sawa	077/59/09	SK Slim Village
Behrang (N59)	Ladang Clunny	077/59/10	SJK (T) Ladang Clunny
Behrang (N59)	Kampong Balun	077/59/11	SK Balun
Behrang (N59)	Behrang Station	077/59/12	SK Sungai Behrang
Behrang (N59)	Behrang Timor	077/59/13	SK Dato Kamaruddin
Behrang (N59)	Behrang Ulu	078/59/14	SK Behrang
Behrang (N59)	Kampong Sungai Sekiah	078/59/15	SJK (C) Behrang Ulu
Behrang (N59)	Kampong Keteyong	077/59/16	SK Tanjong Malim
Behrang (N59)	Kampong Simpang Ampat	077/59/17	SMK Methodist
Behrang (N59)	Kampong Lambak	077/59/18	SK Tanjong Malim
Behrang (N59)	Jalan Keteyong	077/59/19	SJK (T) Tan Sri Dato' Manickavasagam
Behrang (N59)	Kampong Melaka	077/59/20	SJK (T) Tan Sri Dato' Manickavasagam
Behrang (N59)	Jalan Beirop	077/59/21	SMK Methodist
Behrang (N59)	Kampong Loke Yew	077/59/22	SRA Rakyat Al-Jihadiah

=== Representation history ===
Members of Parliament for Tanjong Malim
Parliament	No	Years	Member	Party	Vote Share
Constituency split from Batang Padang
Parliament of the Federation of Malaya
1st	P058	1959–1963	Lee Seck Fun (李锡勋)	Alliance (MCA)	8,038; 62.72%
Parliament of Malaysia
1st	P058	1963–1964	Lee Seck Fun (李锡勋)	Alliance (MCA)	8,038; 62.72%
2nd	P058	1964–1969	Lee Seck Fun (李锡勋)	Alliance (MCA)	9,983; 64.56%
		1969–1971	Parliament was suspended		
3rd	P058	1971–1973	Lee Seck Fun (李锡勋)	Alliance (MCA)	7,822; 46.27%
3rd	P058	1973–1974	Lee Seck Fun (李锡勋)	BN (MCA)	7,822; 46.27%
4th	P063	1974–1978	Mak Hon Kam (麦汉锦)	BN (MCA)	12,460; 64.52%
5th	P063	1978–1982	Mak Hon Kam (麦汉锦)	BN (MCA)	15,805; 68.19%
6th	P063	1982–1986	Mak Hon Kam (麦汉锦)	BN (MCA)	18,745; 67.51%
7th	P071	1986–1990	Loke Yuen Yow (陆垠佑)	BN (MCA)	18,693; 64.12%
8th	P071	1990–1995	Loke Yuen Yow (陆垠佑)	BN (MCA)	23,953; 73.34%
9th	P074	1995–1999	Loke Yuen Yow (陆垠佑)	BN (MCA)	25,752; 83.50%
10th	P074	1999–2004	Loke Yuen Yow (陆垠佑)	BN (MCA)	22,150; 66.96%
11th	P077	2004–2008	Loke Yuen Yow (陆垠佑)	BN (MCA)	24,283; 71.69%
12th	P077	2008–2013	Ong Ka Chuan (黄家泉)	BN (MCA)	21,016; 57.41%
13th	P077	2013–2018	Ong Ka Chuan (黄家泉)	BN (MCA)	28,225; 54.15%
14th	P077	2018–2022	Chang Lih Kang (郑立慷)	PH (PKR)	24,672; 45.44%
15th	P077	2022–present	Chang Lih Kang (郑立慷)	PH (PKR)	25,140; 36.08%

=== State constituency ===
Parliamentary constituency	State constituency						
Parliamentary constituency	1955–1959*	1959–1974	1974–1986	1986–1995	1995–2004	2004–2018	2018–present
Tanjong Malim						Behrang	
Tanjong Malim		Bidor					
Tanjong Malim		Slim					
Tanjong Malim				Sungkai			

=== Historical boundaries ===
State Constituency	Area					
State Constituency	1959	1974	1984	1994	2003	2018
Behrang					Behrang; FELDA Sungai Klah; FELDA Trolak Timur; Tanjung Malim; Ulu Slim	Behrang; FELDA Sungai Klah; FELDA Trolak Timur; Kampung Poh; Tanjung Malim
Bidor	Bidor; FELDA Sungai Klah; Kuala Bikam; Pos Gedong; Sungkai					
Slim	Behrang; FELDA Besout; FELDA Trolak; Slim; Tanjung Malim				FELDA Besout; FELDA Trolak; Kampung Klan Baru; Slim; Slim River	FELDA Besout; FELDA Trolak; Kampung Changkat Sulaiman; Ladang Sungai Kruit; Slim
Sungkai			Bidor; FELDA Sungai Klah; Kuala Bikam; Pos Gedong; Sungkai		Bidor; Kampung Poh; Kuala Bikam; Pos Gedong; Sungkai	Bidor; Kuala Bikam; Ladang Sungai Kruit; Pos Gedong; Sungkai

=== Current state assembly members ===
No.	State Constituency	Member	Coalition (Party)
N57	Sungkai	Sivanesan Achalingam	PH (DAP)
N58	Slim	Muhammad Zulfadli Zainal	PN (PAS)
N59	Behrang	Salina Samsudin	BN (UMNO)

=== Local governments & postcodes ===
No.	State Constituency	Local Government	Postcode
N57	Sungkai	Tapah District Council	35500 Bidor; 35600 Sungkai; 35700 Trolak; 35800, 35820 Slim River; 35900, 35910 Tanjong Malim; 35950 Behrang Stesen
N58	Slim	Tanjong Malim District Council (Trolak area); Tapah District Council	35500 Bidor; 35600 Sungkai; 35700 Trolak; 35800, 35820 Slim River; 35900, 35910 Tanjong Malim; 35950 Behrang Stesen
N59	Behrang	Tanjong Malim District Council; Tapah District Council (FELDA Sungai Klah and Perlok areas)	35500 Bidor; 35600 Sungkai; 35700 Trolak; 35800, 35820 Slim River; 35900, 35910 Tanjong Malim; 35950 Behrang Stesen

== Election results ==
Malaysian general election, 2022
Party	Candidate	Votes	%	∆%
PH	Chang Lih Kang	25,140	36.08	▲36.08
PN	Nolee Ashilin Mohammed Radzi	21,599	31.00	▲31.00
BN	Mah Hang Soon	20,963	30.09	▼5.48
Independent	Jamaluddin Mohd Radzi	1,032	1.48	▲1.48
PEJUANG	Amir Hamzah Abdul Rajak	609	0.87	▲0.87
Independent	Izzat Johari	328	0.47	▲0.47
Total valid votes		69,671	100.00	
Total rejected ballots		1,144		
Unreturned ballots		143		
Turnout		70,928	74.22	▼7.00
Registered electors		93,873		
Majority		3,541	5.08	▼4.79
PH hold		Swing		
Source(s) https://lom.agc.gov.my/ilims/upload/portal/akta/outputp/1753277/PUB610%20PARLIMEN%20PERAK.pdf

Malaysian general election, 2018
Party	Candidate	Votes	%	∆%
PKR	Chang Lih Kang	24,672	45.44	▼0.41
BN	Mah Hang Soon	19,314	35.57	▼18.58
PAS	Mohd Tarmizi Ab Rahman	10,311	18.99	▲18.99
Total valid votes		54,297	100.00	
Total rejected ballots		1,051		
Unreturned ballots		265		
Turnout		55,613	81.22	▼1.57
Registered electors		68,468		
Majority		5,358	9.87	▲1.57
PKR gain from BN		Swing		?
Source(s) "His Majesty's Government Gazette - Notice of Contested Election, Parliament for the State of Perak [P.U. (B) 237/2018]" (PDF). Attorney General's Chambers of Malaysia. 3 May 2018. "Federal Government Gazette - Results of Contested Election and Statements of the Poll after the Official Addition of Votes, Parliamentary Constituencies for the State of Perak [P.U. (B) 311/2018]" (PDF). Attorney General's Chambers of Malaysia. 28 May 2018.

Malaysian general election, 2013
Party	Candidate	Votes	%	∆%
BN	Ong Ka Chuan	28,225	54.15	▼3.26
PKR	Tan Yee Kew	23,897	45.85	▲3.26
Total valid votes		52,122	100.00	
Total rejected ballots		1,115		
Unreturned ballots		162		
Turnout		53,399	82.79	▲11.54
Registered electors		64,499		
Majority		4,328	8.30	▼6.52
BN hold		Swing		
Source(s) "Federal Government Gazette - Notice of Contested Election, Parliament for the State of Perak [P.U. (B) 174/2013]" (PDF). Attorney General's Chambers of Malaysia. 26 April 2013. Archived from the original (PDF) on 2019-12-29. "Federal Government Gazette - Results of Contested Election and Statements of the Poll after the Official Addition of Votes, Parliamentary Constituencies for the State of Perak [P.U. (B) 215/2013]" (PDF). Attorney General's Chambers of Malaysia. 22 May 2013.

Malaysian general election, 2008
Party	Candidate	Votes	%	∆%
BN	Ong Ka Chuan	21,016	57.41	▼14.28
PKR	Mohamad Azman Marjohan	15,594	42.59	▲14.28
Total valid votes		36,610	100.00	
Total rejected ballots		1,344		
Unreturned ballots		153		
Turnout		38,107	71.25	▲4.37
Registered electors		53,481		
Majority		5,422	14.82	▼28.56
BN hold		Swing		

Malaysian general election, 2004
Party	Candidate	Votes	%	∆%
BN	Loke Yuen Yow	24,283	71.69	▲4.73
PKR	Shamsuddin Abd Rahman	9,590	28.31	▼4.73
Total valid votes		33,873	100.00	
Total rejected ballots		1,283		
Unreturned ballots		117		
Turnout		35,273	66.88	▲3.71
Registered electors		52,740		
Majority		14,693	43.38	▲9.46
BN hold		Swing		

Malaysian general election, 1999
Party	Candidate	Votes	%	∆%
BN	Loke Yuen Yow	22,150	66.96	▼16.54
PKR	Ng Lum Yong	10,928	33.04	▲33.04
Total valid votes		33,078	100.00	
Total rejected ballots		1,308		
Unreturned ballots		163		
Turnout		34,549	63.17	▲2.27
Registered electors		54,692		
Majority		11,222	33.92	▼33.08
BN hold		Swing		

Malaysian general election, 1995
Party	Candidate	Votes	%	∆%
BN	Loke Yuen Yow	25,752	83.50	▲10.16
S46	Wan Mokhtar Wan Endut	5,088	16.50	▲16.50
Total valid votes		30,840	100.00	
Total rejected ballots		913		
Unreturned ballots		157		
Turnout		31,910	60.90	▼8.92
Registered electors		52,397		
Majority		20,664	67.00	▲20.32
BN hold		Swing		

Malaysian general election, 1990
Party	Candidate	Votes	%	∆%
BN	Loke Yuen Yow	23,953	73.34	▲9.22
DAP	Abdul Rahim Mat Taib	8,707	26.66	▼0.77
Total valid votes		32,660	100.00	
Total rejected ballots		1,296		
Unreturned ballots		0		
Turnout		33,956	69.82	▲0.37
Registered electors		48,635		
Majority		15,246	46.68	▲9.99
BN hold		Swing		

Malaysian general election, 1986
Party	Candidate	Votes	%	∆%
BN	Loke Yuen Yow	18,693	64.12	▼3.38
DAP	Liew Fatt Yuen	7,995	27.43	▲2.23
PAS	Ho Sing Chong @ Ghazali Ho	2,464	8.45	▲1.16
Total valid votes		29,152	100.00	
Total rejected ballots		684		
Unreturned ballots		0		
Turnout		29,836	69.45	▼4.37
Registered electors		42,959		
Majority		10,698	36.69	▼5.62
BN hold		Swing		

Malaysian general election, 1982
Party	Candidate	Votes	%	∆%
BN	Mak Hon Kam @ Mak Hoon Ting	18,745	67.51	▼0.68
DAP	Zakaria Abdul Manaf	6,996	25.20	▼6.61
PAS	Mohamed Rus Jaafar	2,025	7.29	▲7.29
Total valid votes		27,766	100.00	
Total rejected ballots		901		
Unreturned ballots		0		
Turnout		28,667	73.82	▼2.20
Registered electors		38,836		
Majority		11,749	42.31	▲5.93
BN hold		Swing		

Malaysian general election, 1978
Party	Candidate	Votes	%	∆%
BN	Mak Hon Kam @ Mak Hoon Ting	15,805	68.19	▲3.67
DAP	Zakaria Abdul Manaf	7,374	31.81	▲0.61
Total valid votes		23,179	100.00	
Total rejected ballots		985		
Unreturned ballots		0		
Turnout		24,164	76.02	▲0.66
Registered electors		31,785		
Majority		8,431	36.38	▲5.86
BN hold		Swing		

Malaysian general election, 1974
Party	Candidate	Votes	%	∆%
BN	Mak Hon Kam @ Mak Hoon Ting	12,460	64.52	▲64.52
DAP	Ibrahim Singgeh	6,262	32.42	▼13.64
PEKEMAS	Chong Ah Yin @ Chow Swee Chan	589	3.05	▲3.05
Total valid votes		19,311	100.00	
Total rejected ballots		788		
Unreturned ballots		0		
Turnout		20,099	75.36	▲6.68
Registered electors		26,757		
Majority		6,198	30.52	▲30.31
BN gain from Alliance Party (Malaysia) Party (Malaysia)		Swing		?

Malaysian general election, 1969
Party	Candidate	Votes	%	∆%
Alliance	Lee Seck Fun	7,822	46.27	▲18.29
DAP	Keoh Cheng See	7,787	46.06	▲46.06
PMIP	Abu Samah Majid	1,296	7.67	▲7.67
Total valid votes		16,905	100.00	
Total rejected ballots		1,155		
Unreturned ballots		0		
Turnout		18,060	68.68	▼9.60
Registered electors		26,295		
Majority		35	0.21	▼47.10
Alliance hold		Swing		

Malaysian general election, 1964
Party	Candidate	Votes	%	∆%
Alliance	Lee Seck Fun	9,983	64.56	▲1.84
Independent	Tan Boon Jin	2,667	17.25	▲1.84
Socialist Front	Omar Nordin	2,328	15.05	▲15.05
Independent	Abdul Rahman Abdul Wahab	486	3.14	▲3.14
Total valid votes		15,464	100.00	
Total rejected ballots		856		
Unreturned ballots		0		
Turnout		16,320	78.28	▲10.71
Registered electors		20,849		
Majority		7,655	47.31	▲21.87
Alliance hold		Swing		

Malayan general election, 1959
Party	Candidate	Votes	%
Alliance	Lee Seck Fun	8,038	62.72
PPP	R. C. Mahadeva Rayan	4,777	37.28
Total valid votes		12,815	100.00
Total rejected ballots		208	
Unreturned ballots		0	
Turnout		13,023	67.57
Registered electors		19,274	
Majority		3,261	25.44
This was a new constituency created.
