= Batu Gajah (federal constituency) =

Malaysian federal constituency

Batu Gajah (P066)
Perak constituency

Federal constituency
- Legislature: Dewan Rakyat
- MP: Sivakumar Varatharaju Naidu; PH
- Constituency created: 1958
- First contested: 1959
- Last contested: 2022

Demographics
- Population (2020): 137,227
- Electors (2022): 111,896
- Area (km²): 216
- Pop. density (per km²): 635.3

Batu Gajah is a federal constituency in Kinta District, Perak, Malaysia, that has been represented in the Dewan Rakyat since 1959.

The federal constituency was created in the 1958 redistribution and is mandated to return a single member to the Dewan Rakyat under the first past the post voting system.

== Demographics ==
Ethnic breakdown of Batu Gajah's electorate as of 2022
1. Chinese (69.1%)
2. Indian (17.2%)
3. Malay (13.4%)
4. Other ethnicities (0.30%)

As of 2020, Batu Gajah has a population of 137,227 people.

Age breakdown of Batu Gajah's electorate as of 2022
1. 18–20 (5.00%)
2. 21–29 (17.8%)
3. 30–39 (17.8%)
4. 40–49 (18.4%)
5. 50–59 (16.8%)
6. 60–69 (13.3%)
7. 70–79 (7.60%)
8. 80–89 (2.84%)
9. above 90 (0.48%)
Gender breakdown of Batu Gajah's electorate as of 2022
1. Male (50.5%)
2. Female (49.5%)

== History ==
=== Polling districts ===
According to the gazette issued on 31 October 2022, the Batu Gajah constituency has a total of 34 polling districts.

State constituency	Polling districts	Code	Location
Jelapang (N31)	Jelapang Timor	066/31/01	Dewan Orang Ramai Jelapang
Jelapang (N31)	Jelapang Utara	066/31/02	SJK (C) Jelapang
Jelapang (N31)	Jelapang Selatan	066/31/03	Tadika Jelapang
Jelapang (N31)	Jelapang Barat	066/31/04	Dewan Orang Ramai Jelapang
Jelapang (N31)	Jelapang	066/31/05	SJK (C) Jelapang
Jelapang (N31)	Silibin	066/31/06	SK Silibin
Jelapang (N31)	Taman Pertama	066/31/07	SJK (C) Yuh Hua
Jelapang (N31)	Taman Rishah	066/31/08	SJK (C) Yuh Hua
Jelapang (N31)	Jelapang Tengah	066/31/09	SJK (C) Jelapang
Jelapang (N31)	Bukit Kledang	066/31/10	SJK (C) Wan Hwa 2
Jelapang (N31)	Papan	066/31/11	SJK (C) Papan
Menglembu (N32)	Bandar Baru Menglembu	066/32/01	SMK Seri Keledang
Menglembu (N32)	Menglembu Lama	066/32/02	SMK Menglembu
Menglembu (N32)	Awana	066/32/03	SJK (C) Wan Hwa 1
Menglembu (N32)	Menglembu Barat	066/32/04	SJK (T) Menglembu
Menglembu (N32)	Menglembu Selatan	066/32/05	SMK Menglembu
Menglembu (N32)	Bukit Merah Timor	066/32/06	SJK (C) Bukit Merah
Menglembu (N32)	Bukit Merah Barat	066/32/07	SJK (C) Bukit Merah
Menglembu (N32)	Bukit Merah Tengah	066/32/08	SJK (C) Bukit Merah
Menglembu (N32)	Bukit Merah Barat Daya	066/32/09	SJK (C) Bukit Merah
Menglembu (N32)	Bukit Merah Selatan	066/32/10	Dewan Orang Ramai Bukit Merah
Menglembu (N32)	Lahat	066/32/11	SJK (C) Lahat
Tronoh (N33)	Gunong Hijau	066/33/01	SJK (C) Gunong Hijau
Tronoh (N33)	Jalan Lahat	066/33/02	SJK (C) Yit Chee
Tronoh (N33)	Jalan Siputeh	066/33/03	SJK (C) Yit Chee
Tronoh (N33)	Pekan Pusing	066/33/04	SK Pusing; SMK Pusing
Tronoh (N33)	Batu Gajah Utara	066/33/05	SMK Sultan Yussuf
Tronoh (N33)	Batu Gajah Selatan	066/33/06	SMK Toh Indera Wangsa Ahmad
Tronoh (N33)	Penempatan India	066/33/07	SJK (T) Changkat
Tronoh (N33)	Bemban	066/33/08	SJK (C) Bemban
Tronoh (N33)	Siputeh	066/33/09	SK Siputeh
Tronoh (N33)	Tronoh	066/33/10	SMK Tronoh
Tronoh (N33)	Nalla	066/33/11	SJK (C) Kampung Nalla
Tronoh (N33)	Kampong Bali	066/33/12	SJK (C) Kampung Bali

=== Representation history ===
Members of Parliament for Batu Gajah
Parliament	No	Years	Member	Party	Vote Share
Constituency created from Kinta Selatan
Parliament of the Federation of Malaya
1st	P052	1959–1963	Khong Kok Yat (孔国日)	PPP	8,442; 55.30%
Parliament of Malaysia
1st	P052	1963–1964	Khong Kok Yat (孔国日)	PPP	8,442; 55.30%
2nd	P052	1964–1969	Ng Fah Yam (吴华炎)	Alliance (MCA)	9,843; 51.89%
		1969–1971	Parliament was suspended		
3rd	P052	1971–1974	Lim Cho Hock (林子鹤)	DAP	12,240; 61.34%
4th	P058	1974–1978	Chian Heng Kai (陈庆佳)	DAP	13,549; 48.47%
5th	P058	1978–1982	Chian Heng Kai (陈庆佳)	DAP	18,752; 60.06%
6th	P058	1982–1986	Ban Hon Keong (万汉强)	BN (MCA)	19,156; 54.98%
7th	P060	1986–1990	Ting Chek Ming (陈则明)	DAP	21,501; 62.09%
8th	P060	1990–1995	Foo Piew Kok (符标国)	GR (DAP)	22,223; 61.88%
9th	P063	1995–1999	Yeong Chee Wah (杨智华)	BN (MCA)	20,155; 52.04%
10th	P063	1999–2004	Fong Po Kuan (冯宝君)	BA (DAP)	19,867; 52.49%
11th	P066	2004–2008	Fong Po Kuan (冯宝君)	DAP	28,847; 58.09%
12th	P066	2008–2013	Fong Po Kuan (冯宝君)	PR (DAP)	39,922; 72.30%
13th	P066	2013–2015	Sivakumar Varatharaju Naidu (வ. சிவகுமார்)	PR (DAP)	53,770; 77.78%
13th	P066	2015–2018	Sivakumar Varatharaju Naidu (வ. சிவகுமார்)	PH (DAP)	53,770; 77.78%
14th	P066	2018–2022	Sivakumar Varatharaju Naidu (வ. சிவகுமார்)	PH (DAP)	52,850; 84.17%
15th	P066	2022–present	Sivakumar Varatharaju Naidu (வ. சிவகுமார்)	PH (DAP)	60,999; 81.38%

=== State constituency ===
Parliamentary constituency	State constituency						
Parliamentary constituency	1955–1959*	1959–1974	1974–1986	1986–1995	1995–2004	2004–2018	2018–present
Batu Gajah				Falim			
Batu Gajah						Jelapang	
Batu Gajah			Kampar				
Batu Gajah				Lahat			
Batu Gajah					Menglembu		
Batu Gajah		Pusing					
Batu Gajah		Tanjong Tualang					
Batu Gajah						Tronoh	

=== Historical boundaries ===
State Constituency	Area					
State Constituency	1959	1974	1984	1994	2003	2018
Falim			Bukit Merah; Falim; Kampung Cempaka Sari; Kledang; Menglembu			
Jelapang					Bukit Kledang; Falim; Jelapang; Papan; Silibin	Bukit Kledang; Jelapang; Papan; Silibin; Taman Sepakat
Kampar		Ayer Hitam; Kampar; Keranji; Mambang Diawan; Tronoh Mines				
Lahat			Bandar Seri Botani; Batu Gajah; Jelapang; Lahat; Pusing	Batu Gajah; Bukit Kledang; Bukit Merah; Lahat; Pusing		
Menglembu				Falim; Jelapang; Kledang; Kuala Pari; Menglembu	Bukit Merah; Kledang; Kuala Pari; Lahat; Menglembu	Bukit Merah; Kledang; Lahat; Menglembu; Sungai Serokai
Pusing	Batu Gajah; Kampung Baru Nalla; Pusing; Siputeh; Tronoh					
Tanjong Tualang	Batu Gajah; FELCRA Sungai Durian; Kampung Changkat Tin; Kampung Seri Rahmat; Tanjong Tualang	Batu Gajah; FELCRA Sungai Durian; Kampung Changkat Mengkenan; Kampung Changkat Tin; Tanjong Tualang				
Tronoh					Batu Gajah; Bemban; Siputeh; Taman Anggerik; Tronoh	Batu Gajah; Bemban; Pusing; Siputeh; Tronoh

=== Current state assembly members ===
No.	State Constituency	Member	Coalition (Party)
N31	Jelapang	Cheah Pou Hian	PH (DAP)
N32	Menglembu	Chaw Kam Foon	PH (DAP)
N33	Tronoh	Steven Tiw Tee Siang	PH (DAP)

=== Local governments & postcodes ===
No.	State Constituency	Local Government	Postcode
N31	Jelapang	Ipoh City Council; Batu Gajah District Council (Papan area)	30020, 30100, 30200, 31450, 31500 Ipoh; 31000 Batu Gajah; 31550, 31560 Pusing; 31750 Tronoh
N32	Menglembu	Ipoh City Council	30020, 30100, 30200, 31450, 31500 Ipoh; 31000 Batu Gajah; 31550, 31560 Pusing; 31750 Tronoh
N33	Tronoh	Batu Gajah District Council	30020, 30100, 30200, 31450, 31500 Ipoh; 31000 Batu Gajah; 31550, 31560 Pusing; 31750 Tronoh

== Election results ==
Malaysian general election, 2022
Party	Candidate	Votes	%	∆%
PH	Sivakumar Varatharaju	60,999	81.38	▲81.38
PN	Woo Cheong Yuen	7,163	9.56	▲9.56
BN	Teoh Chin Chong	6,793	9.06	▼5.25
Total valid votes		74,955	100.00	
Total rejected ballots		825		
Unreturned ballots		155		
Turnout		75,935	67.86	▼10.52
Registered electors		111,896		
Majority		53,836	71.82	▲1.95
PH hold		Swing		
Source(s) https://lom.agc.gov.my/ilims/upload/portal/akta/outputp/1753277/PUB610%20PARLIMEN%20PERAK.pdf

Malaysian general election, 2018
Party	Candidate	Votes	%	∆%
PKR	Sivakumar Varatharaju Naidu	52,850	84.17	▲84.17
BN	Leong Chee Wai	8,982	14.31	▼7.91
Parti Sosialis Malaysia	Kunasekaran Krishnan	955	1.52	▲1.52
Total valid votes		62,787	100.00	
Total rejected ballots		733		
Unreturned ballots		284		
Turnout		63,804	78.38	▲5.60
Registered electors		81,399		
Majority		43,868	69.87	▲25.27
PKR hold		Swing		
Source(s) "His Majesty's Government Gazette - Notice of Contested Election, Parliament for the State of Perak [P.U. (B) 237/2018]" (PDF). Attorney General's Chambers of Malaysia. 3 May 2018. "Federal Government Gazette - Results of Contested Election and Statements of the Poll after the Official Addition of Votes, Parliamentary Constituencies for the State of Perak [P.U. (B) 311/2018]" (PDF). Attorney General's Chambers of Malaysia. 28 May 2018.

Malaysian general election, 2013
Party	Candidate	Votes	%	∆%
DAP	Sivakumar Varatharaju Naidu	53,770	77.78	▲5.48
BN	Loo Thin Tuck	15,360	22.22	▼5.48
Total valid votes		69,130	100.00	
Total rejected ballots		966		
Unreturned ballots		174		
Turnout		70,270	80.23	▲7.45
Registered electors		87,587		
Majority		38,410	55.56	▲10.96
DAP hold		Swing		
Source(s) "Federal Government Gazette - Notice of Contested Election, Parliament for the State of Perak [P.U. (B) 174/2013]" (PDF). Attorney General's Chambers of Malaysia. 26 April 2013. Archived from the original (PDF) on 29 December 2019. "Federal Government Gazette - Results of Contested Election and Statements of the Poll after the Official Addition of Votes, Parliamentary Constituencies for the State of Perak [P.U. (B) 215/2013]" (PDF). Attorney General's Chambers of Malaysia. 22 May 2013.

Malaysian general election, 2008
Party	Candidate	Votes	%	∆%
DAP	Fong Po Kuan	39,922	72.30	▲14.22
BN	Cheah Yoke Can	15,295	27.70	▼14.22
Total valid votes		55,217	100.00	
Total rejected ballots		911		
Unreturned ballots		142		
Turnout		56,270	72.78	▲3.12
Registered electors		77,313		
Majority		24,627	44.60	▲38.42
DAP hold		Swing		

Malaysian general election, 2004
Party	Candidate	Votes	%	∆%
DAP	Fong Po Kuan	28,847	58.09	▲5.60
BN	Ong Ka Chuan	20,814	41.91	▼5.11
Total valid votes		49,661	100.00	
Total rejected ballots		1,056		
Unreturned ballots		235		
Turnout		50,952	69.66	▲3.98
Registered electors		73,143		
Majority		8,033	6.18	▲0.71
DAP hold		Swing		

Malaysian general election, 1999
Party	Candidate	Votes	%	∆%
DAP	Fong Po Kuan	19,867	52.49	▲4.53
BN	Yeong Chee Wah	17,796	47.02	▼5.02
MDP	Yang Kar Ming	186	0.49	▲0.49
Total valid votes		37,849	100.00	
Total rejected ballots		925		
Unreturned ballots		0		
Turnout		38,774	65.68	▼2.95
Registered electors		59,034		
Majority		2,071	5.47	▲1.39
DAP gain from BN		Swing		?

Malaysian general election, 1995
Party	Candidate	Votes	%	∆%
BN	Yeong Chee Wah	20,155	52.04	▲13.92
DAP	Ngeh Koo Ham	18,576	47.96	▼13.92
Total valid votes		38,731	100.00	
Total rejected ballots		1,220		
Unreturned ballots		159		
Turnout		40,110	68.63	▼0.22
Registered electors		58,443		
Majority		1,579	4.08	▼19.68
BN gain from DAP		Swing		?

Malaysian general election, 1990
Party	Candidate	Votes	%	∆%
DAP	Foo Piew Kok	22,223	61.88	▼0.21
BN	Lee Chan Fai @ Lee Soon Heng	13,689	38.12	▲2.23
Total valid votes		35,912	100.00	
Total rejected ballots		901		
Unreturned ballots		0		
Turnout		36,813	68.85	▼2.27
Registered electors		53,465		
Majority		8,534	23.76	▼2.44
DAP hold		Swing		

Malaysian general election, 1986
Party	Candidate	Votes	%	∆%
DAP	Ting Chek Ming	21,501	62.09	▲17.07
BN	Ooi Foh Sing	12,429	35.89	▼19.09
SDP	Abu Samah Majid	699	2.02	▲2.02
Total valid votes		34,629	100.00	
Total rejected ballots		719		
Unreturned ballots				
Turnout		35,348	71.12	▼4.35
Registered electors		49,701		
Majority		9,072	26.20	▲16.24
DAP gain from BN		Swing		?

Malaysian general election, 1982
Party	Candidate	Votes	%	∆%
BN	Ban Hon Keong	19,156	54.98	▲15.04
DAP	Liew Ah Kim	15,686	45.02	▼15.04
Total valid votes		34,842	100.00	
Total rejected ballots		1,168		
Unreturned ballots		0		
Turnout		36,010	75.47	▼2.76
Registered electors		47,717		
Majority		3,470	9.96	▼10.16
BN gain from DAP		Swing		?

Malaysian general election, 1978
Party	Candidate	Votes	%	∆%
DAP	Chian Heng Kai @ Chin Soo Ha	18,752	60.06	▲11.59
BN	Chan Kit Chee	12,471	39.94	▼3.67
Total valid votes		31,223	100.00	
Total rejected ballots		1,505		
Unreturned ballots		0		
Turnout		32,728	78.23	▲2.04
Registered electors		41,835		
Majority		6,281	20.12	▲15.26
DAP hold		Swing		

Malaysian general election, 1974
Party	Candidate	Votes	%	∆%
DAP	Chian Heng Kai @ Chin Soo Ha	13,549	48.47	▼12.87
BN	Cheah Chun Chin	12,192	43.61	▲43.61
PEKEMAS	Choong Tien Chuan	1,647	5.89	▲5.89
Independent	Hashim Gera	568	2.03	▲2.03
Total valid votes		27,956	100.00	
Total rejected ballots		850		
Unreturned ballots		0		
Turnout		28,806	76.19	▼1.69
Registered electors		37,809		
Majority		1,357	4.86	▼22.34
DAP hold		Swing		

Malaysian general election, 1969
Party	Candidate	Votes	%	∆%
DAP	Lim Cho Hock	12,240	61.34	▲61.34
Alliance	Ng Fah Yam	6,812	34.14	▼17.75
PMIP	Adnan Mohd Hashim	901	4.52	▲4.52
Total valid votes		19,953	100.00	
Total rejected ballots		1,137		
Unreturned ballots		0		
Turnout		21,090	77.88	▼9.45
Registered electors		27,081		
Majority		5,428	27.20	▲23.42
DAP gain from Alliance		Swing		?

Malaysian general election, 1964
Party	Candidate	Votes	%	∆%
Alliance	Ng Fah Yam	9,843	51.89	▲9.29
PPP	Khong Kok Yat	9,127	48.11	▼7.19
Total valid votes		18,970	100.00	
Total rejected ballots		903		
Unreturned ballots		0		
Turnout		19,873	83.77	▲10.49
Registered electors		23,723		
Majority		716	3.78	▼8.92
Alliance gain from PPP		Swing		?

Malayan general election, 1959
Party	Candidate	Votes	%
PPP	Khong Kok Yat	8,442	55.30
Alliance	Yeoh Kian Teik	6,503	42.60
Independent	Thean Moi Tuck	322	2.11
Total valid votes		15,267	100.00
Total rejected ballots		127	
Unreturned ballots		0	
Turnout		15,394	73.28
Registered electors		21,006	
Majority		1,939	12.70
This was a new constituency created.
