= Jementah (state constituency) =

Political subdivision in Malaysia

Jementah (N02)
Johor constituency

State constituency
- Legislature: Johor State Legislative Assembly
MLA
See Ann Giap
BN
- Constituency created: 1984
- First contested: 1986
- Last contested: 2026

Demographics
- Population (2020): 44,055
- Electors (2026): 41,137
- Area (km²): 347

Jementah is a state constituency in Johor, Malaysia, that is represented in the Johor State Legislative Assembly.

The state constituency was first contested in 1986 and is mandated to return a single Assemblyman to the Johor State Legislative Assembly under the first-past-the-post voting system.

== Demographics ==
As of 2020, Jementah has a population of 44,055 people.

Ethnic breakdown of Jementah's electorate as of 2026
1. Chinese (49.2%)
2. Malay (41.8%)
3. Indian (7.70%)
4. Other ethnicities (1.20%)

== History ==
=== Polling districts ===
According to the gazette issued on 2 July 2026, the Jementah constituency has a total of 26 polling districts.

State constituency	Polling districts	Code	Location
Jementah (N02)	Gemas Baru	140/02/01	SJK (T) Lasang Fortrose
Jementah (N02)	Fortrose	140/02/02	SJK (T) Ladang Fortrose
Jementah (N02)	Sungai Senarut	140/02/03	SJK (T) Ldg Sungai Senarut
Jementah (N02)	Bandar Batu Anam	140/02/04	SMK Dato' Ahmad Arshad
Jementah (N02)	Batu Anam	140/02/05	SMK Seri Kenangan
Jementah (N02)	Bandan	140/02/06	Balai Raya Kampong Lubok Bandan
Jementah (N02)	Welch	140/02/07	SK Ladang Welch
Jementah (N02)	Paya Jakas	140/02/08	SK Paya Jakas
Jementah (N02)	Bandar Jementah Barat	140/02/09	SA Jementah
Jementah (N02)	Bandar Jementah Timor	140/02/10	SMK Jementah
Jementah (N02)	Bandar Jementah Tengah	140/02/11	SJK (C) Jementah 1
Jementah (N02)	Bandar Jementah Selatan	140/02/12	Dewan Seberguna Jementah
Jementah (N02)	Jementah	140/02/13	SK Jementah
Jementah (N02)	Sungai Siput	140/02/14	Balai Raya Kampung Sg. Siput
Jementah (N02)	Kampong Bukit Tunggal	140/02/15	SK Bukit Tunggal
Jementah (N02)	Tebing Tinggi	140/02/16	SK Tebing Tinggi
Jementah (N02)	Gemereh	140/02/17	SK Gemereh
Jementah (N02)	Berata	140/02/18	SA Gemereh
Jementah (N02)	Jalam Kolam Air	140/02/19	SA Bandar Segamat
Jementah (N02)	Sungai Kapeh	140/02/20	SK Bukit Hampar
Jementah (N02)	Pasar	140/02/21	SJK (C) Seg Hwa
Jementah (N02)	Bandar	140/02/21	SJK (C) Seg Hwa
Jementah (N02)	Jalan Gemereh	140/02/23	SMK Gemereh
Jementah (N02)	Genuang	140/02/24	Dewan Seberguna Kampung Abdullah
Jementah (N02)	Genuang Selatan	140/02/25	Dewan Choon Chew Chee Kampung Abdullah
Jementah (N02)	Kampong Abdullah Utara	140/02/26	SJK (C) Li Chi

=== Representation history ===
Members of the Legislative Assembly for Jementah
Assembly	No	Years	Member	Party
Constituency created from Bandar Segamat and Buloh Kasap
7th	N02	1986–1990	Lim Si Cheng (林時清)	BN (MCA)
8th	N02	1990–1995	Wong Peng Sheng (黃炳昇)	DAP
9th	N02	1995–1999	Gan Lian Keng @ Lee Ah Kau (颜联庆)	BN (MCA)
10th	N02	1999–2004	Gan Lian Keng @ Lee Ah Kau (颜联庆)	BN (MCA)
11th	N02	2004–2008	Lee Hong Tee (李煌治)	BN (MCA)
12th	N02	2008–2013	Lee Hong Tee (李煌治)	BN (MCA)
13th	N02	2013–2018	Tan Chen Choon (陈正春)	PR (DAP)
14th	N02	2018–2022	Tan Chen Choon (陈正春)	PH (DAP)
15th	N02	2022–2026	Ng Kor Sim (黃炣卿)	PH (DAP)
16th	N02	2026–present	See Ann Giap (徐安岄)	BN (MCA)

== Election results ==
Johor state election, 2026
Party	Candidate	Votes	%	∆%
BN	See Ann Giap	12,522	46.31	▲8.68
PH	Ng Kor Sim	11,609	42.94	▲2.02
PN	Saifullah Abdul Wahab	2,907	10.75	▼10.70
Total valid votes		27,038	100.00	
Total rejected ballots		303		
Unreturned ballots		33		
Turnout		27,374	66.54	▲12.82
Registered electors		41,137		
Majority		913	3.38	▲0.09
BN gain from PH		Swing		?

Johor state election, 2022
Party	Candidate	Votes	%	∆%
PH	Ng Kor Sim	8,877	40.92	▲40.92
BN	See Ann Giap	8,163	37.63	▲3.88
PN	Maimunah Safwa Musa	4,654	21.45	▲21.45
Total valid votes		21,694	100.00	
Total rejected ballots		348		
Unreturned ballots		104		
Turnout		22,146	53.73	▼29.87
Registered electors		41,221		
Majority		714	3.29	▼22.03
PH hold		Swing		
Source(s) "Federal Government Gazette - Results of Contested Election and Statements of the Poll After the Official Addition of Votes - State Constituencies for the State of Johore [P.U. (B) 166/2022]" (PDF). Attorney General's Chambers of Malaysia. 17 May 2022. Archived from the original (PDF) on 5 January 2023.

Johor state election, 2018
Party	Candidate	Votes	%	∆%
PKR	Tan Chen Choon	16,336	59.07	▲59.07
BN	Chiam Yok Meng	9,335	33.75	▼11.55
PAS	Khairul Faizi Ahmad Kamil	1,986	7.18	▲7.18
Total valid votes		27,657	100.00	
Total rejected ballots		557		
Unreturned ballots		0		
Turnout		28,296	83.60	▼0.80
Registered electors		33,866		
Majority		7,001	25.32	▲15.92
PKR hold		Swing		

Johor state election, 2013
Party	Candidate	Votes	%	∆%
DAP	Tan Chen Choon	12,781	54.70	▲9.74
BN	Lee Hong Tee	10,585	45.30	▼9.74
Total valid votes		23,366	100.00	
Total rejected ballots		428		
Unreturned ballots		44		
Turnout		23,794	84.40	
Registered electors		28,230		
Majority		2,196	9.40	
DAP gain from BN		Swing		-

Johor state election, 2008
Party	Candidate	Votes	%	∆%
BN	Lee Hong Tee	9,912	55.04	▼8.37
DAP	Pang Hok Liong	8,098	44.96	▲8.37
Total valid votes		18,010	100.00	
Total rejected ballots		424		
Unreturned ballots		0		
Turnout		18,434	72.91	
Registered electors		28,230		
Majority		1,814	10.07	
BN hold		Swing		

Johor state election, 2004
Party	Candidate	Votes	%	∆%
BN	Lee Hong Tee	11,174	63.41	▲0.12
DAP	Pang Hok Liong	6,449	36.59	▲0.53
Total valid votes		17,623	100.00	
Total rejected ballots		370		
Unreturned ballots		0		
Turnout		17,993	70.44	
Registered electors		28,230		
Majority		4,725	26.81	
BN hold		Swing		

Johor state election, 1999
Party	Candidate	Votes	%	∆%
BN	Gan Lian Keng	12,849	63.29	▼3.85
DAP	Wong Peng Seng	7,323	36.07	▲4.94
Total valid votes		20,303	100.00	
Total rejected ballots		579		
Unreturned ballots		64		
Turnout		20,946	70.44	
Registered electors		29,664		
Majority		5,526	27.22	
BN hold		Swing		

Johor state election, 1995
Party	Candidate	Votes	%	∆%
BN	Gan Lian Keng	13,354	67.13	▲18.24
DAP	Wong Peng Seng	6,449	32.03	▼19.08
Total valid votes		19,892	100.00	
Total rejected ballots		427		
Unreturned ballots		26		
Turnout		20,345	72.26	
Registered electors		28,155		
Majority		6,983	35.10	
BN hold		Swing		

Johor state election, 1990
Party	Candidate	Votes	%
DAP	Wong Peng Seng	9,252	51.11
BN	Gan Lian Keng	8,850	48.89
Total valid votes		18,102	100.00
Total rejected ballots		463	
Unreturned ballots		56	
Turnout		18,621	72.58
Registered electors		25,656	
Majority		402	2.22
BN hold		Swing	

Johor state election, 1986
Party	Candidate	Votes	%
On the nomination day, Lim Si Cheng won uncontested.
BN	Lim Si Cheng		
Total valid votes			100.00
Total rejected ballots			
Unreturned ballots			
Turnout			
Registered electors			
Majority			
This was a new constituency created.
