= Teja (state constituency) =

Political subdivision in Malaysia

Teja (N46)
Perak constituency

State constituency
- Legislature: Perak State Legislative Assembly
MLA
Sandrea Ng Shy Ching
PH
- Constituency created: 1986
- First contested: 1986
- Last contested: 2022

Demographics
- Electors (2022): 32,970

Teja is a state constituency in Perak, Malaysia, that has been represented in the Perak State Legislative Assembly.

== Demographics ==
Ethnic breakdown of Teja's electorate as of 2022
1. Chinese (42.2%)
2. Malay (38.0%)
3. Indian (10.4%)
4. Other ethnicities (9.38%)

== History ==
=== Polling districts ===
According to the federal gazette issued on 30 March 2018, the Teja constituency is divided into 11 polling districts.

State constituency	Polling district	Code	Location
Teja（N46）	Pos Raya	071/46/01	SK Pos Raya
Teja（N46）	Kampong Kepayang	071/46/02	SMK Simpang Pulai
Teja（N46）	Kampong Tekkah Baharu	071/46/03	SK Pengkalan Baharu
Teja（N46）	Kampong Bharu Kopisan	071/46/04	SJK (C) New Kopisan; SK Gopeng
Teja（N46）	Lawan Kuda Barat	071/46/05	SMK Seri Teja; SMK Idris Shah
Teja（N46）	Lawan Kuda Timor	071/46/06	SJK (C) Lawan Kuda Baru
Teja（N46）	Lawan Kuda Selatan	071/46/07	SJK (C) Lawan Kuda Baru
Teja（N46）	Kampong Pulai	071/46/08	Dewan Serbaguna Teja Kampong Pulai
Teja（N46）	Kampong Rawa	071/46/09	SK Gopeng
Teja（N46）	Gopeng	071/46/10	SJK (C) Man Ming
Teja（N46）	Kampong Sungai Itek	071/46/11	SK Sungai Itek; SK Ulu Geruntum

=== Representation history ===
Members of the Legislative Assembly for Teja
Assembly	No	Years	Name	Party
Constituency created from Gopeng, Chemor and Chenderiang
7th	N31	1986-1990	Loh Boon Eng (罗文恩)	BN (MCA)
8th	N31	1990-1995	R. K. Muthu	DAP
9th	N36	1995-1999	Ho Wai Cheong (何炜昌)	BN (MCA)
10th	N36	1999-2004	Ho Wai Cheong (何炜昌)	BN (MCA)
11th	N45	2004-2008	Ho Wai Cheong (何炜昌)	BN (MCA)
12th	N45	2008-2013	Chang Lih Kang (郑立慷)	PR (PKR)
13th	N45	2013-2018	Chang Lih Kang (郑立慷)	PR (PKR)
14th	N46	2018-2022	Sandrea Ng Shy Ching (黃诗情)	PH (PKR)
15th	N46	2022–present	Sandrea Ng Shy Ching (黃诗情)	PH (PKR)

== Election results ==
Perak state election, 2022
Party	Candidate	Votes	%	∆%
PH	Sandrea Ng Shy Ching	10,814	46.50	▲46.50
BN	Liew Yee Lin	6,259	26.91	▼5.96
PN	Ahmad Ishak	5,794	24.91	▲24.91
PEJUANG	Aswannudin Hariffudin	214	0.92	▲0.92
Heritage	Low Leong Sin	176	0.76	▲0.76
Total valid votes		23,257	100.00	
Total rejected ballots		309		
Unreturned ballots		29		
Turnout		23,959	72.67	▼6.28
Registered electors		32,970		
Majority		4,555	19.59	▼3.85
PH hold		Swing		

Perak state election, 2018
Party	Candidate	Votes	%	∆%
PKR	Sandrea Ng Shy Ching	10,546	56.31	▲0.32
BN	Albert Chang Chun Cheun	6,156	32.87	▼11.14
PAS	Mokthar Abdullah	2,028	10.83	▲10.83
Total valid votes		18,730	97.90	
Total rejected ballots		321	1.68	
Unreturned ballots		80	0.42	
Turnout		19,131	78.94	▼1.86
Registered electors		24,234		
Majority		4,390	23.44	▲11.46
PKR hold		Swing		
Source(s) "Results of the contested election and statements of the pall after the official addition of votes".

Perak state election, 2013
Party	Candidate	Votes	%	∆%
PKR	Chang Lih Kang	9,732	55.99	▲5.31
BN	Yew Sau Kham	7,650	44.01	▼5.31
Total valid votes		17,382	97.23	
Total rejected ballots		464	2.60	
Unreturned ballots		31	0.17	
Turnout		17,877	80.80	▲12.30
Registered electors		22,118		
Majority		2,082	11.98	▲10.62
PKR hold		Swing		
Source(s) "KEPUTUSAN PILIHAN RAYA UMUM DEWAN UNDANGAN NEGERI". Archived from the original on 2022-04-08.

Perak state election, 2008
Party	Candidate	Votes	%	∆%
PKR	Chang Lih Kang	6,533	50.68	▲50.98
BN	Yew Sau Kham	6,358	49.32	▼11.14
Total valid votes		12,891	97.23	
Total rejected ballots		367	2.77	
Unreturned ballots		0	0.00	
Turnout		13,258	68.50	▲5.16
Registered electors		19,355		
Majority		175	1.36	▼19.56
PKR gain from BN		Swing		?
Source(s) "KEPUTUSAN PILIHAN RAYA UMUM DEWAN UNDANGAN NEGERI PERAK BAGI TAHUN 2008".

Perak state election, 2004
Party	Candidate	Votes	%	∆%
BN	Ho Wai Cheong	6,775	60.46	▲4.68
DAP	Abdul Rahman Said Alli	4,430	39.54	▼4.68
Total valid votes		11,205	96.94	
Total rejected ballots		255	2.21	
Unreturned ballots		99	0.86	
Turnout		11,559	63.34	▲1.63
Registered electors		18,250		
Majority		2,345	20.92	▲8.20
BN hold		Swing		
Source(s) "KEPUTUSAN PILIHAN RAYA UMUM DEWAN UNDANGAN NEGERI PERAK BAGI TAHUN 2004".

Perak state election, 1999
Party	Candidate	Votes	%	∆%
BN	Ho Wai Cheong	8,029	55.78	▼12.73
DAP	Wong Yoon Choong	6,197	43.06	▲11.57
MDP	Narayanan Alluriah	167	1.16	▲1.16
Total valid votes		14,393	97.55	
Total rejected ballots		361	2.45	
Unreturned ballots		1	0.01	
Turnout		14,755	61.71	▼4.78
Registered electors		23,912		
Majority		1,832	12.72	▼24.30
BN hold		Swing		
Source(s) "KEPUTUSAN PILIHAN RAYA UMUM DEWAN UNDANGAN NEGERI PERAK BAGI TAHUN 2004".

Perak state election, 1995
Party	Candidate	Votes	%	∆%
BN	Ho Wai Cheong	9,873	68.51	▲17.37
DAP	Tan Mee Lin	4,538	31.49	▼17.37
Total valid votes		14,411	97.12	
Total rejected ballots		428	2.88	
Unreturned ballots		0	0.00	
Turnout		14,839	66.49	▼0.88
Registered electors		22,319		
Majority		5,335	37.02	▲34.74
BN hold		Swing		
Source(s) "KEPUTUSAN PILIHAN RAYA UMUM DEWAN UNDANGAN NEGERI PERAK BAGI TAHUN 2004".

Perak state election, 1990
Party	Candidate	Votes	%	∆%
DAP	R. K. Muthu	6,847	51.14	▲3.75
BN	Ho Wai Cheong	6,543	48.86	▼1.31
Total valid votes		13,390	96.75	
Total rejected ballots		450	3.25	
Unreturned ballots		0	0.00	
Turnout		13,840	67.37	▼3.42
Registered electors		20,543		
Majority		304	2.28	▼0.50
BN hold		Swing		
Source(s) "KEPUTUSAN PILIHAN RAYA UMUM DEWAN UNDANGAN NEGERI PERAK BAGI TAHUN 1990".

Perak state election, 1986
Party	Candidate	Votes	%
BN	Loh Boon Eng	6,597	50.17
DAP	R. K. Muthu	6,232	47.39
SDP	Lau Ken Fah	321	2.44
Total valid votes		13,150	96.97
Total rejected ballots		411	3.03
Unreturned ballots		0	0.00
Turnout		13,561	70.79
Registered electors		19,158	
Majority		365	2.78
This was a new constituency created.
Source(s) "KEPUTUSAN PILIHAN RAYA UMUM DEWAN UNDANGAN NEGERI PERAK BAGI TAHUN 1986".
