= Atomic energy =

Energy carried by atoms

Atomic energy or energy of atoms is energy carried by atoms. The term originated in 1903 when Ernest Rutherford began to speak of the possibility of atomic energy. H. G. Wells popularized the phrase "splitting the atom", before discovery of the atomic nucleus.

Atomic energy includes:

- Nuclear binding energy, the energy required to split a nucleus of an atom.
- Nuclear potential energy, the potential energy of the particles inside an atomic nucleus.
- Nuclear reaction, a process in which nuclei or nuclear particles interact, resulting in products different from the initial ones; see also nuclear fission and nuclear fusion.
- Radioactive decay, the set of various processes by which unstable atomic nuclei (nuclides) emit subatomic particles.

Atomic energy is the source of nuclear power, which uses sustained nuclear fission to boil water. It is also the source of the explosive force of an atomic bomb.

== See also ==
- Atomic Age
- Index of environmental articles
