= Chang Lih Kang =

Malaysian politician (born 1980)

Yang Berhormat Datuk Chang Lih Kang PMW MP
- 郑立慷
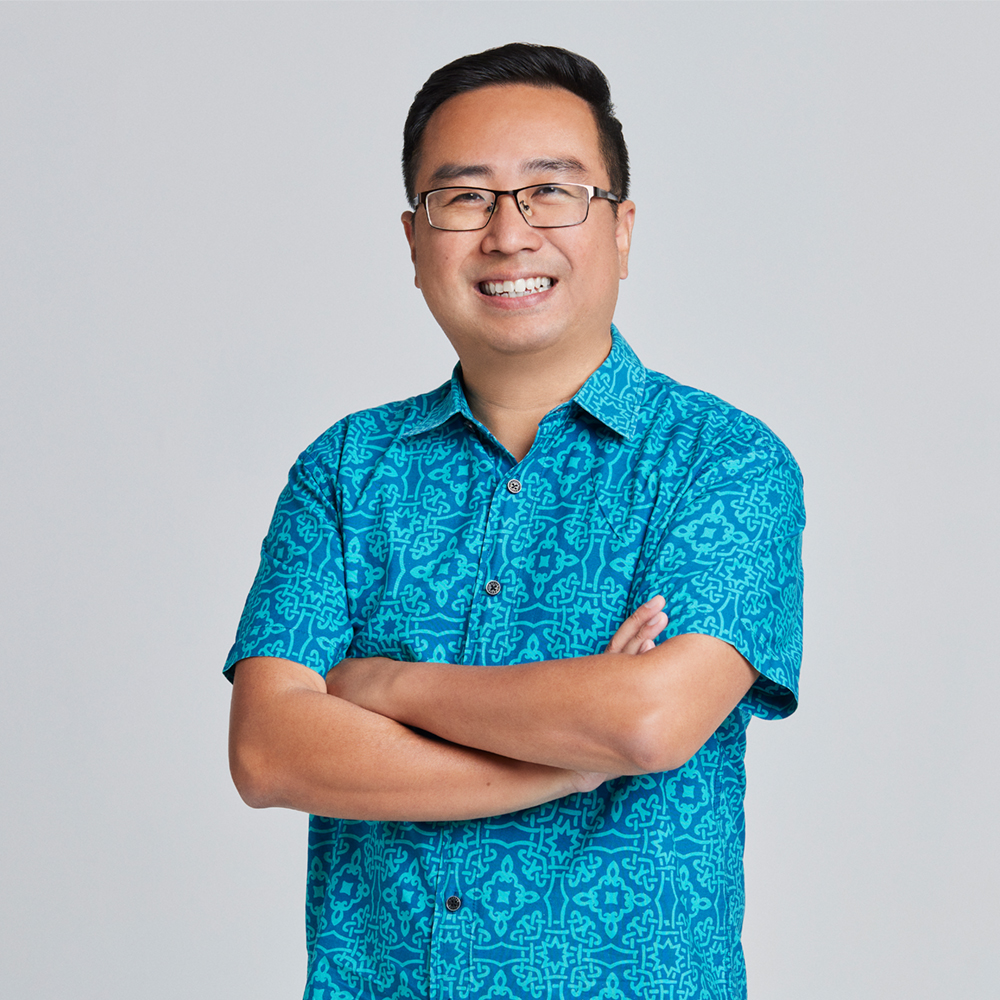

Minister of Science, Technology and Innovation
- Incumbent
- Assumed office 3 December 2022
- Monarchs: Abdullah (2022–2024); Ibrahim (since 2024)
- Prime Minister: Anwar Ibrahim
- Deputy: Arthur Joseph Kurup (2022–2023); Yusof Apdal (since 2023)
- Preceded by: Adham Baba
- Constituency: Tanjong Malim

Vice President of the People's Justice Party Appointed (2018–2022), Elected (since 2022)
- Incumbent
- Assumed office 28 December 2018 Serving with: Nurul Izzah Anwar &; Zuraida Kamaruddin (2018–2020) &; Xavier Jayakumar Arulanandam (2018–2021) &; Chua Tian Chang (2018–2022) &; Ali Biju (2018–2020) &; Michael Teo Yu Keng (2020–2022) &; Rafizi Ramli (2018–2022) &; Amirudin Shari (since 2022) &; Nik Nazmi Nik Ahmad (2022–2025) &; Aminuddin Harun (since 2022) &; Awang Husaini Sahari (2022–2025) &; Saraswathy Kandasami (2022–2025) &; Ramanan Ramakrishnan (since 2025)
- President: Anwar Ibrahim

Member of the Malaysian Parliament for Tanjong Malim
- Incumbent
- Assumed office 9 May 2018
- Preceded by: Ong Ka Chuan; (BN–MCA)
- Majority: 5,358 (2018); 3,541 (2022)

Member of the Perak State Legislative Assembly for Teja
- In office 8 March 2008 – 8 May 2018
- Preceded by: Ho Wai Cheong; (BN–MCA)
- Succeeded by: Sandrea Ng Shy Ching; (PH–PKR)
- Majority: 2,082 (2013); 175 (2008)

Personal details
- Born: Chang Lih Kang; 23 October 1980 (age 45) Ipoh, Kinta District, Perak, Malaysia
- Citizenship: Malaysia
- Party: People's Justice Party (PKR)
- Other political affiliations: Pakatan Rakyat (PR); (2008–2015); Pakatan Harapan (PH); (since 2015)
- Spouse: Chong Lai Chan @ Zhuang Lizhen (庄丽珍)
- Children: 2
- Education: University of Putra Malaysia, National University of Singapore
- Occupation: Politician
- Profession: Civil engineer

Chang Lih Kang (simplified Chinese: 郑立慷; traditional Chinese: 鄭立慷; pinyin: Zhèng Lìkāng, born 23 October 1980) is a Malaysian politician who has served as the Minister of Science, Technology and Innovation in the Unity Government administration under Prime Minister Anwar Ibrahim since December 2022 and the Member of Parliament (MP) for Tanjong Malim since May 2018. He served as Member of the Perak State Legislative Assembly (MLA) for Teja from March 2008 to May 2018. He is a member of the People's Justice Party (PKR), a component party of the PH coalition and has served as a Vice President of PKR since December 2018.

== Personal life and education ==
Chang holds a Bachelor of Engineering in Civil Engineering from University of Putra Malaysia and a Master in Public Administration from the Lee Kuan Yew School of Public Policy, National University of Singapore. He has a net worth of RM1 million as of September 2022.

== Political career ==
Chang Lih Kang joined Parti Keadilan Rakyat shortly after he graduated from university and made his debut in the 2008 General Election. He won the Teja state seat with a 175 vote majority. He would go on to defend the seat with a larger majority in 2013. In 2018, Chang decided to contest for the Tanjong Malim parliamentary seat, which was a Barisan Nasional stronghold and would go on and win the seat with a 5,000 over majority.

Chang was appointed as a Vice President of PKR by Anwar Ibrahim in 2018. In the 2022 party election, he would go on and contest and successfully got elected as one of the Vice Presidents of PKR after securing 34,939 votes, finishing second behind Amirudin Shari, thus making him the highest ranked ethnic Chinese and fourth highest position in the party.

In the 2022 general election, Chang Lih Kang successfully retained his Tanjong Malim federal seat, albeit with a smaller majority against Malaysian Chinese Association Deputy President Mah Hang Soon. Following the appointment of Anwar Ibrahim as the 10th Prime Minister of Malaysia, Chang was appointed as the Minister of Science, Technology and Innovation of Malaysia.

== Minister of Science, Technology and Innovation ==
In his capacity as minister, Chang Lih Kang launched the Hydrogen Economy and Technology Roadmap (HETR), which is set to address the 3 critical energy challenges - reliability, affordability and sustainability. The roadmap is a blueprint for new technologies and innovations in energy transition, embracing the potential of the hydrogen economy.

In August 2023, Chang said the Ekonomi Malaysia Madani plan is a strategic approach drive innovation in the country, in which he sets out the aim for a gross expenditure on Research & Development (GERD) of 3.5% by 2030 and aims for Malaysia to rank among the top 20 in the Global Innovation Index (GII) by 2025.

== Election results ==
Perak State Legislative Assembly
Year	Constituency	Candidate	Votes	Pct	Opponent(s)	Votes	Pct	Ballots cast	Majority	Turnout
2008	N45 Teja	Chang Lih Kang (PKR)	6,533	49.28%	Yew Sau Kham (MCA)	6,358	47.96%	13,258	175	68.50%
2013	N45 Teja	Chang Lih Kang (PKR)	9,732	54.44%	Yew Sau Kham (MCA)	7,650	42.79%	17,877	2,082	80.80%

Parliament of Malaysia
Year	Constituency	Candidate	Votes	Pct	Opponent(s)	Votes	Pct	Ballots cast	Majority	Turnout
2018	P077 Tanjong Malim	Chang Lih Kang (PKR)	24,672	45.44%	Mah Hang Soon (MCA)	19,314	35.57%	55,613	5,358	81.22%
2018	P077 Tanjong Malim	Chang Lih Kang (PKR)	24,672	45.44%	Mohd Tarmizi Ab Rahman (PAS)	10,311	18.99%	55,613	5,358	81.22%
2022	P077 Tanjong Malim	Chang Lih Kang (PKR)	25,140	36.08%	Nolee Ashilin Mohammed Radzi (BERSATU)	21,599	31.00%	69,671	3,541	74.22%
2022	P077 Tanjong Malim	Chang Lih Kang (PKR)	25,140	36.08%	Mah Hang Soon (MCA)	20,963	30.09%	69,671	3,541	74.22%
2022	P077 Tanjong Malim	Chang Lih Kang (PKR)	25,140	36.08%	Jamaluddin Mohd Radzi (IND)	1,032	1.48%	69,671	3,541	74.22%
2022	P077 Tanjong Malim	Chang Lih Kang (PKR)	25,140	36.08%	Amir Hamzah Abdul Rajak (IMAN)	609	0.87%	69,671	3,541	74.22%
2022	P077 Tanjong Malim	Chang Lih Kang (PKR)	25,140	36.08%	Ishak Zuhari (IND)	328	0.47%	69,671	3,541	74.22%

== Honours ==
=== Honours of Malaysia ===
- Malaysia
  - Recipient of the 17th Yang di-Pertuan Agong Installation Medal
- Federal Territory (Malaysia)
  - Commander of the Order of the Territorial Crown (PMW) – Datuk (2026)
