= State legislative assembly =

State legislative assembly may refer to

- State legislative assemblies of India
- State legislative assemblies of Malaysia
