= Exalted Order of Malacca =

Chivalric order of the Malaysian state of Malacca

Exalted Order of Malacca Darjah Seri Melaka

Awarded by the Yang di-Pertua Negeri of Malacca
- Type: Order
- Founded: 1978
- Status: Currently constituted
- Founder: Tun Syed Zahiruddin
- Grand Master: Tun Seri Setia Mohd Ali Rustam
- Grades: Grand Commander (DGSM); Commander (DCSM); Companion (DMSM); Lieutenant (DPSM); Member (DSM)
- Post-nominals: DGSM; DCSM; DMSM; DPSM; DSM

Precedence
- Next (higher): Premier and Exalted Order of Malacca
- Next (lower): None (lowest)
- – Ribbon bar

The Exalted Order of Malacca (Malay: Darjah Seri Melaka) is the third-highest state order of Malacca which is conferred by the Yang di-Pertua Negeri of Malacca. The order was constituted in 1978 by Yang di-Pertua Negeri Syed Zahiruddin along with the Premier and Exalted Order of Malacca.

== History ==
The Exalted Order of Malacca was established in 1978 by Yang di-Pertua Negeri Syed Zahiruddin along with the Premier and Exalted Order of Malacca. The order was established as the second highest state order and continued to be the second highest order until the creation of the Premier and Faithful Exalted Order of Malacca as the highest order by Yang di-Pertua Negeri Mohd Ali Rustam in 2020 following which the Exalted Order of Malacca became the state's third highest order.

== Grades ==
The Exalted Order of Malacca is conferred in five grades: Grand Commander, Knight Commander, Knight Companion, Companion, and Member.

=== Grand Commander ===
Darjah Gemilang Seri Melaka (DGSM) – Datuk Seri

The Grand Commander of the Exalted Order of Malacca (Malay: Darjah Gemilang Seri Melaka) is the highest grade of the order which was constituted in 1983 and amended in 2016. The recipients of the grade bear the title of "Datuk Seri", while the wives of the male recipients are titled as "Datin Seri". Husbands of female recipients are not entitled to any title. The recipients bear the post-nominal letters of "D.G.S.M."

The insignia of the grade comprises a collar, a sash, a badge and a star. The sash is worn from the right shoulder to the left hip.

The Grand Commander grade of the order is conferred at the advice of the Chief Minister and is conferred on heads of the state governments, heads of federal and state public services, ministers, members of Malacca EXCO Council, ambassadors and others of equivalent rank.

=== Commander ===
Darjah Cemerlang Seri Melaka (DCSM) – Datuk Wira

The Commander of the Exalted Order of Malacca (Malay: Darjah Cemerlang Seri Melaka) is the second highest grade of the order which was constituted in 1978. The recipients of the grade bear the title of "Datuk Wira", while the wives of the male recipients are titled as "Datin Wira". Husbands of female recipients are not entitled to any title. The recipients bear the post-nominal letters of "D.C.S.M."

The insignia of the grade comprises a collar, a sash, a badge and a star. The sash is worn from the right shoulder to the left hip.

The Commander grade of the order is conferred upon members of the state and federal governments and public services, members of the state government, members of the corporate sectors and others who have contributed with excellent and commendable services at the state or federal level.

=== Companion ===
Darjah Mulia Seri Melaka (DMSM) – Datuk

The Companion of the Exalted Order of Malacca (Malay: Darjah Mulia Seri Melaka) is the third grade of the order which was constituted in 1971. The recipients of the grade bear the title of "Datuk", while the wives of the male recipients are titled as "Datin". Husbands of female recipients are not entitled to any title. The recipients bear the post-nominal letters of "D.M.S.M."

The insignia of the grade comprises a sash, a badge and a star. The sash is worn from the right shoulder to the left hip.

The Companion grade of the order is conferred upon members of the Malacca State EXCO council, members of the state government, heads of the state or federal departments, members of the corporate sectors, politicians and other equivalents who have contributed with excellent and commendable services at the state or federal level.

=== Lieutenant ===
Darjah Pangkuan Seri Melaka (DPSM) – Datuk

The Lieutenant of the Exalted Order of Malacca (Malay: Darjah Pangkuan Seri Melaka) is the fourth grade of the order which was constituted in 2010. The recipients of the grade bear the title of "Datuk", while the wives of the male recipients are titled as "Datin". Husbands of female recipients are not entitled to any title. The recipients bear the post-nominal letters of "D.P.S.M."

The insignia of the grade Lieutenant a sash, a badge and a star. The sash is worn from the right shoulder to the left hip.

The Lieutenant grade of the order is conferred upon senior heads of the state or federal government departments and other equivalents for their excellent and commendable services to Malacca.

=== Member ===
Darjah Seri Melaka (DSM)

The Member of the Exalted Order of Malacca (Malay: Darjah Seri Melaka) is the lowest grade of the order which was constituted in 1971. The recipients are not entitled to bear any title. The post-nominal letters of the grade of the order is "D.S.M."

The insignia of the grade comprises a necklet which is worn by the recipients around the neck.

The Member grade of the order is conferred upon officials of the state government and other equivalent individuals for their devotion and services to Malacca.

== Recipients ==
=== Grand Commander (D.G.S.M.) ===
- 1983: Chong Hon Nyan
- 1983: Mohd Adib Mohamad Adam
- 1984: Abdul Rahim Thamby Chik
- 1984: Sanusi Junid
- 1984: Abdul Ajib Ahmad
- 1988: Abdul Taib Mahmud
- 1989: Muhammad Muhammad Taib
- 1991: Abu Talib Othman
- 1991: Anwar Ibrahim
- 1991: Azizan Zainul Abidin
- 1993: Ling Liong Sik
- 1994: Ahmad Sarji Abdul Hamid
- 1995: Marfuza Sheikh Mohd Osman
- 1995: Mohd Zin Abdul Ghani
- 1996: Salleh Said Keruak
- 1996: Abdul Halim Ali
- 1996: Ali Abul Hassan Sulaiman
- 1997: Abu Zahar Ithnin
- 1997: Mohamed Rahmat
- 1998: Mohtar Abdullah
- 1999: Eusoff Chin
- 2000: Daim Zainuddin
- 2001: Mohd Ali Rustam
- 2002: Samsudin Osman
- 2003: Tajol Rosli Mohd Ghazali
- 2003: Musa Aman
- 2004: Abdul Aziz Shamsuddin
- 2004: Abdul Gani Patail
- 2004: Abdul Kadir Sheikh Fadzir
- 2004: Adnan Yaakob
- 2004: Syed Razak Syed Zain Barakbah
- 2005: Annuar Musa
- 2005: Fong Chan Onn
- 2005: Tengku Adnan Tengku Mansor
- 2006: Chua Soi Lek
- 2006: Nor Mohamed Yakcop
- 2006: Zainuddin Maidin
- 2007: Azmi Khalid
- 2007: Rafidah Aziz
- 2007: Syed Hamid Albar
- 2009: Maximus Ongkili
- 2009: Liow Tiong Lai
- 2009: Mohd Sidek Hassan
- 2009: Noh Omar
- 2009: Zambry Abdul Kadir
- 2010: Ng Yen Yen
- 2010: Zaki Azmi
- 2011: H. Muhammad Sani
- 2011: Subramaniam Sathasivam
- 2011: Pax Mangudadatu (Honorary)
- 2011: Shaziman Abu Mansor
- 2011: Chor Chee Heung
- 2011: Rusli Zainal (Honorary)
- 2012: Alex Noerdin (Honorary)
- 2012: Gatot Pujo Nugroho (Honorary)
- 2013: Idris Haron
- 2014: Fadillah Yusof
- 2014: Hishammuddin Hussein
- 2014: Lee Matthew
- 2015: Mustapa Mohamed
- 2015: Wee Ka Siong
- 2016: Abdul Ghafar Atan
- 2016: Adenan Satem
- 2016: Ahmad Hamzah
- 2016: Ahmad Kamarulzaman Ahmad Badaruddin
- 2016: Ali Hamsa
- 2016: Lim Kok Wing
- 2016: Mohamed Apandi Ali
- 2016: Mohd Hussin Abd Hamid
- 2016: Naim Abu Bakar
- 2016: Son Chen Chuan
- 2016: Tan Kean Soon
- 2017: Ab Rauf Yusoh
- 2017: Gwee Yew Kiat
- 2017: Latiff Tamby Chik
- 2017: Md Yunos Husin
- 2017: Ng Kim Leng (Honorary)
- 2017: Pang Chee Khiong
- 2017: Poh Geok Seng
- 2017: Rahadian Mahmud Mohamed Khalil
- 2017: Soon Tian Szu
- 2017: Syed Mohd Yusof Syed Nasir
- 2017: Wan Junaidi Tuanku Jaafar
- 2017: Wang Yen Liang
- 2018: Noormustafa Kamal Yahya
- 2018: Borhan Dolah
- 2018: Roslan Ibrahim
- 2018: Roslan Md Taha
- 2018: Mohamad Fazil Shafie
- 2018: H'ng Bak Tee
- 2018: Ahmad Awang
- 2018: Shamsul Iskandar Md Akin
- 2018: Mohd Redzuan Md Yusof
- 2018: Dzulkefly Ahmad
- 2018: Mujahid Yusof Rawa
- 2018: Saifuddin Nasution Ismail
- 2018: Rina Harun
- 2018: Navaratnam a/l Narayanan
- 2018: Chua Ma Yu
- 2018: Jamil Salleh
- 2019: Mukhriz Mahathir
- 2019: Salahuddin Ayub
- 2019: Hasim Hasan
- 2019: Amir Hamzah Azizan
- 2019: Giles Bien Chia Hsui
- 2019: Kamaludin Md Said
- 2019: Mohammad bin Mentek
- 2019: Pang Tee Nam
- 2019: Piong Teck Min
- 2019: Rashpal Singh Randhay
- 2019: Suresh Raj a/l Lachmanan
- 2019: Teo Shiok Fu
- 2020: Affendi Buang
- 2020: Ismail Sabri Yaakob
- 2020: Mohamed Farid Abu Hassan
- 2020: Mohd Firuz Jaffril
- 2020: Noraini Ahmad
- 2021: Acryl Sani Abdullah Sani
- 2021: Zamrose Mohd Zain
- 2022: Ayob Khan Mydin Pitchay
- 2022: Prabowo Subianto (honorary)
- 2023: Razarudin Husain
- 2024: Irmohizam Ibrahim
- 2024: Lim Yeow Siong
- 2024: Mohammad Ab Rahman
- 2024: Shamsul Azri Abu Bakar
- 2024: Shum Che Kok
- 2025: Tiong King Sing
- 2025: Mohd Nizam Jaffar
- 2026: Fadhlina Sidek
- 2026: Hashim Hamzah
- 2026: Mohd Khalid Ismail
- 2026: Abdul Halim Aman
- 2026: Muhamad Norazlan Aris
- 2026: Sazali Hamzah
- 2026: Megat Zulkarnain Omardin

=== Commander (D.C.S.M.) ===
- 1983: Hashim Aman
- 1986: Abdul Rahman Arshad
- 1992: Mohd Zam Abdul Wahab
- 1993: Halim Saad
- 1993: Mohd Noor Ahmad
- 1994: Borhan Ahmad
- 1995: Abdul Rahman Jamal
- 1995: Gan Boon Leong
- 1995: Mohd Ali Rustam
- 1997: Ab Aziz Tapa
- 1997: Mohd Saleh Sulong
- 1998: Abdul Aziz Omar
- 1998: Abu Seman Yusop
- 1998: Mohamed Said Mohamed Ali
- 1999: Ismail Hashim
- 1999: Mazlan Ahmad
- 2000: Mohd Ghazali Mohd Yusoff
- 2001: Abdul Aziz Mohd Yusof
- 2001: Abdul Rahman Yatim
- 2001: Borhan Md Yaman
- 2001: Poh Ah Tiam
- 2003: Fong Chan Onn
- 2004: Ahmad Hamzah
- 2006: Mohd Anwar Mohd Nor
- 2006: Musa Hassan
- 2007: Awang Adek Hussin
- 2008: Wee Ka Siong
- 2009: Ahmad Hasbullah Mohd Nawawi
- 2009: Abdul Aziz Jaafar
- 2009: Ahmad Said Hamdan
- 2010: Lajim Ukin
- 2010: Syed Mokhtar Albukhary
- 2010: Rosni Sohar
- 2011: Ali Hamsa
- 2011: Abdul Ghafar Atan
- 2011: Idris Haron
- 2012: Mohd Irwan Serigar Abdullah
- 2012: Ismail Omar
- 2012: Zulkifeli Mohd Zin
- 2013: Khalid Abu Bakar
- 2014: Ab Rauf Yusoh
- 2014: Raja Mohamed Affandi
- 2015: Zamrose Mohd Zain
- 2015: Abdul Azeez Abdul Rahim
- 2016: Lee Chong Wei
- 2016: Norpipah Abdol
- 2016: Abdul Rahaman Abdul Karim
- 2016: S. Jeyaindran
- 2016: Gan Tian Loo
- 2016: Mohamad Fuzi Harun
- 2016: Abu Bakar Bin Mohamad Diah
- 2016: Roslan Md Taha
- 2016: Ghazale Muhamad
- 2017: Halimah Mohamed Sadique
- 2017: Razali Ibrahim
- 2017: Koh Nai Kwong
- 2017: Mas Ermieyati Samsudin
- 2017: Ismail Othman
- 2017: Zulkiple Kassim
- 2017: Ahmad Jazlan Yaakub
- 2018: Mohd Hatta Ramli
- 2018: Abdul Ghani Samsudin
- 2018: Omar Jaafar
- 2018: Mohamed Farid Md Rafik
- 2019: Marzuki Yahya
- 2019: Mohd Anuar Mohd Tahir
- 2020: Irmohizam Ibrahim
- 2020: Megat Zulkarnain Omardin
- 2020: Latipah Omar
- 2020: Ibrahim Durum
- 2021: Asmah Abdul Rahman
- 2021: Soh Chin Ann
- 2021: Md Rawi Mahmud
- 2021: Hasan Abd Rahman
- 2021: Mohd Rafiq Naizamohideen
- 2022: Zaidi Johari
- 2022: Zaini Jass
- 2022: Johan Abd Aziz
- 2023: Abdul Razak Abdul Rahman
- 2023: Asyraf Wajdi Dusuki
- 2024: Zuriyah Abdul Aziz
- 2024: Lim Ban Hong
- 2024: Shahrul Azuwar Abdul Aziz
- 2024: Roslan Abdul Rahman
- 2024: Mahadi Badrul Zaman
- 2025: Johan Rozali-Wathooth

=== Companion (D.M.S.M.) ===
- 1975: Abdullah Mohd Salleh
- 1982: Gan Boon Leong
- 1987: Abu Zahar Ithnin
- 1989: Mohd Ali Rustam
- 1990: Mohd Zin Abdul Ghani
- 1992: Poh Ah Tiam
- 1993: Ahmad Zahid Hamidi
- 1993: Fong Chan Onn
- 1993: Mohamed Nazri Abdul Aziz
- 1994: Ibrahim Durum
- 1994: Abu Seman Yusop
- 1994: Ibrahim Ali
- 1994: Mohamad Fatmi Che Salleh
- 1995: Mohd Sedek Mohd Ali
- 1995: Mohd Idris Jusi
- 1995: Ahmad Mohd Don
- 1996: Ahmad Hamzah
- 1996: Gopal Sri Ram
- 1996: A. Samad Said
- 1996: Zaini Mohd Said
- 1999: Awang Adek Hussin
- 2000: Tengku Adnan Tengku Mansor
- 2000: Noh Omar
- 2000: Hasan Malek
- 2001: Mohd Johari Baharum
- 2001: Ruslin Hasan
- 2002: Ab Rauf Yusoh
- 2002: Abdul Rahim Bakri
- 2002: Shafie Apdal
- 2002: Chor Chee Heung
- 2002: Abdul Aziz Jaafar
- 2002: Md Sirat Abu
- 2002: Sairin Karno
- 2002: Christopher Wan Soo Kee
- 2003: Abdul Latiff Ahmad
- 2003: Azimi Daim
- 2003: Tiki Lafe
- 2003: Zaid Ibrahim
- 2003: Adham Baba
- 2003: Tajuddin Abdul Rahman
- 2003: Abdul Latiff Ahmad
- 2003: Zahidi Zainul Abidin
- 2004: Ismail Sabri Yaakob
- 2004: Abdul Ghafar Atan
- 2004: Mohammad Said Yusof
- 2004: Rahman Ismail
- 2004: Abdul Halim Abdul Samad
- 2004: Yussof Mahal
- 2004: Abdul Rahman Bakar
- 2004: Hasim Rusdi
- 2005: Noraini Ahmad
- 2005: Ghulamhaidar Khan
- 2005: Idris Haron
- 2005: Zakaria Edris
- 2006: Hashim Suboh
- 2006: Ayub Yaakob
- 2006: Zulkifeli Mohd Zin
- 2006: Samsolbari Jamali
- 2007: Jamil Salleh
- 2006: Tee Siew Kiong
- 2007: Mohd Jidin Shafee
- 2007: Saravanan Murugan
- 2007: Koh Nai Kwong
- 2007: Arif Shah Omar Shah
- 2007: Kamarudin Md Nor
- 2008: Misbun Sidek
- 2008: Shah Rukh Khan (honorary)
- 2008: Mazlan Mansor
- 2009: Abdul Rahman Bakri
- 2009: Ahmad Maslan
- 2009: Lai Meng Chong
- 2009: Wee Jeck Seng
- 2009: Norpipah Abdol
- 2009: Ghazale Muhamad
- 2009: Latipah Omar
- 2009: Zakaria Sharif
- 2010: Ismail Othman
- 2010: Hasan Abd Rahman
- 2013: Azam Baki
- 2013: Hamidah Khamis
- 2013: Amiruddin Yusop
- 2014: Mas Ermieyati Samsudin
- 2014: Lim Ban Hong
- 2014: Roslan Ahmad
- 2015: Md Rawi Mahmud
- 2015: Zaidi Attan
- 2016: Mazlan Lazim
- 2016: Ramli Din
- 2016: Ibrahim Abdullah
- 2016: Shamsudin Mehat
- 2016: Rosli Mat Hassan
- 2017: Mohamad Ali Mohamad
- 2018: Husam Musa
- 2018: Hasan Bahrom
- 2018: Mohd Rafiq Naizamohideen
- 2018: Mohd Sofi Abdul Wahab
- 2018: Wong Fort Pin
- 2018: Tey Kok Kiew
- 2019: Ginie Lim Siew Lin
- 2018: Muhammad Jailani Khamis
- 2019: Norhizam Hassan Baktee
- 2019: Noor Effandi Ahmad
- 2020: Rahmad Mariman
- 2022: Isham Ishak
- 2022: Omar Raisul As-Salam Syah AS Omar
- 2023: Fairul Nizam Roslan
- 2024: Muhamad Akmal Saleh
- 2024: Zahid Rastam

=== Lieutenant (D.P.S.M.) ===
- 2011: Bashir Alias
- 2011: Chua Tee Yong
- 2011: Noriah Kasnon
- 2011: Noor Ehsanuddin Mohd Harun Narrashid
- 2011: Matulidi Jusoh
- 2011: Razali Idris
- 2011: Shahrul Zaman Yahya
- 2011: Wan Norashikin Wan Noordin
- 2012: Ahmad Badri Mohd Zahir
- 2012: Ismail Bakar
- 2013: Abd Halim Jusoh
- 2013: Mohan Thangarasu
- 2013: Rosyam Nor
- 2013: Shabudin Yahaya
- 2013: Vigneswaran Sanasee
- 2014: Abdul Razak Abdul Rahman
- 2014: Lim Pay Hen
- 2015: Abdul Rahman Ayob
- 2015: Dzulkifli Ahmad
- 2016: Chong Sin Woon
- 2016: Jason Teoh Sew Hock
- 2016: Kalsom Noordin
- 2016: Mohd Salleh Saidin
- 2016: Tan Teik Cheng
- 2016: Tengku Muhammad Fauzi Tengku Ibrahim
- 2019: Gue Teck
- 2019: Wan Abdul Rahim Wan Abdullah
- 2020: Budiman Mohd Zohdi
- 2020: Hameed Mytheen Kunju Basheer
- 2020: Khaidirah Abu Zahar
- 2020: Nicole Wong Siaw Ting
- 2020: Norshida Ibrahim
- 2020: Mohd Izhar Ahmad
- 2020: Rais Yasin
- 2022: Larry Sng Wei Shien
- 2022: Eldeen Husaini Mohd Hashim
- 2023: Mohd Noor Helmy Abdul Halem
- 2024: Remy Ishak
- 2025: Fan Bingbing
- Unknown : Mohd Asna Amin
- 2026:Yap Chen Hiong

== See also ==
- Orders, decorations, and medals of the Malaysian states and federal territories#Malacca
- List of post-nominal letters (Malacca)
