= Al Azim Mosque =

Mosque in Melaka City, Melaka, Malaysia

- Masjid Al Azim مسجد العظيم
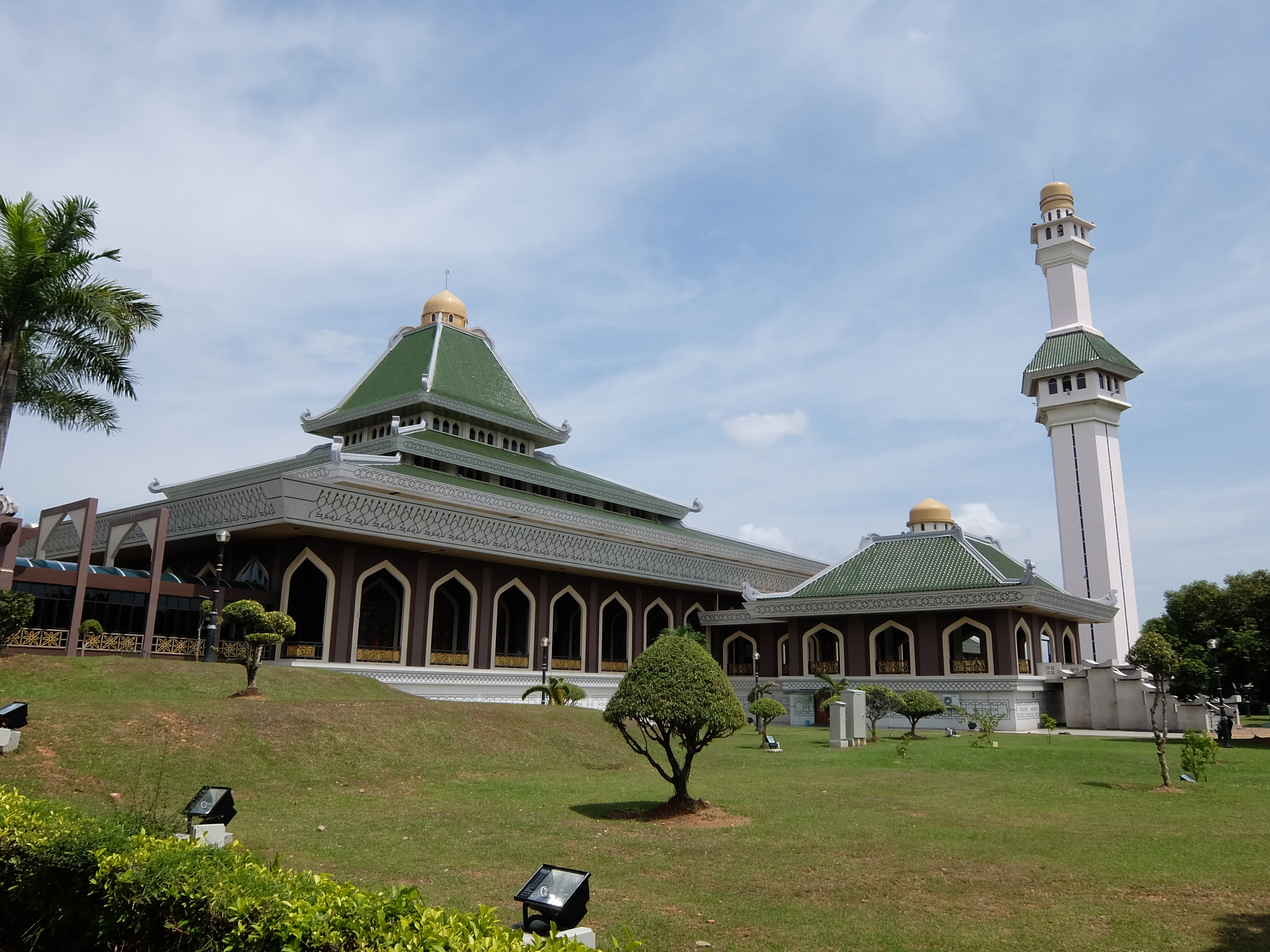

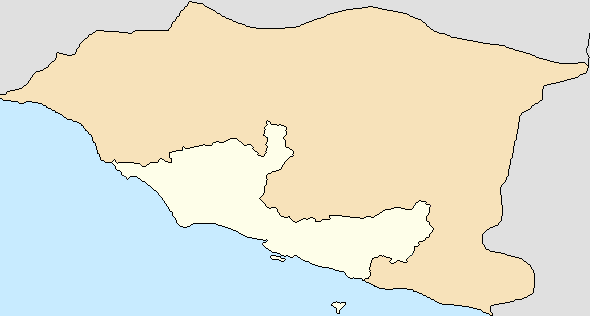
- Location within Malacca City

Religion
- Affiliation: Islam
- Branch/tradition: Sunni

Location
- Location: Jalan Solok Balik Bukit, Malacca, Malaysia
- Interactive map of Al Azim Mosque
- Coordinates: 2°12′55″N 102°15′44″E

Architecture
- Type: mosque
- Style: Malay
- Minaret: 1

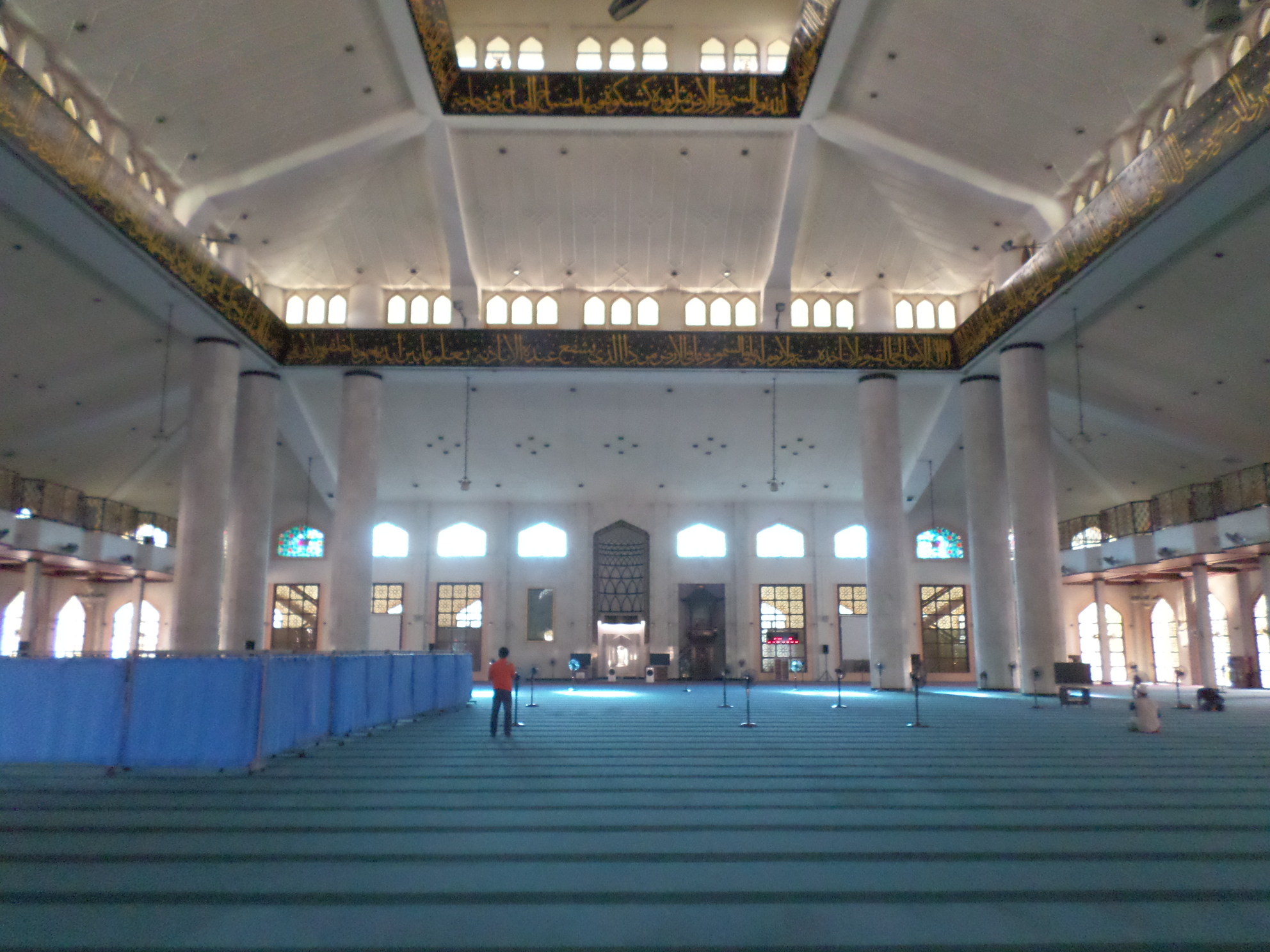
Al Azim Mosque prayer hall

Al-Azim Mosque (Malay: Masjid Al-Azim) is the state mosque of Malacca. It is located next to the Malacca General Hospital, the Malacca Al-Quran Museum and the State Heroes Mausoleum (Malay: Makam Pahlawan Negeri) and was constructed to replace the former state mosque at Tranquerah Mosque and officially opened on 13 July 1990 by the ninth Yang di-Pertuan Agong, Sultan Azlan Shah of Perak.

The state mosque follows typical Malaccan mosque architecture in the Malay style of the archipelago. The interior of the mosque also shows native influence and local Malacca Malay architecture. Aziz Tapa is one of the backpine who did the architecture on the mosque. The mosque has a lecture hall, auditorium, offices, a cafe and a museum. The mosque can accommodate 12,000 worshippers.

== Makam Pahlawan Negeri (State Heroes Mausoleum) ==
- Tun Syed Ahmad Al-Haj Syed Mahmud Shahabuddin – Malacca state Yang di-Pertua Negeri (Governor) (1984–2004) (died 2008)
- Datuk Seri Abu Zahar Ithnin – 8th Malacca state Chief Minister (1997–1999) (died 2013)
- Toh Puan Zurina Kassim – Wife of the former Malacca state governor, Tun Mohd Khalil Yaakob (died 2022)
- Datuk Seri Mohd Adib Mohamad Adam – 5th Malacca state Chief Minister (1978–1982) (died 2022)
- Datuk Seri Haji Mohd Zain Haji Abdul Ghani - 7th Malacca state Chief Minister (14 Oktober 1994-14 Mei 1997) (died 1997).

== See also ==
- Islam in Malaysia
- List of mosque in Malaysia
