= Premier and Exalted Order of Malacca =

Chivalric order of the Malaysian state of Malacca

Premier and Exalted Order of Malacca Darjah Utama Negeri Melaka

Awarded by the Yang di-Pertua Negeri of Malacca
- Type: Order
- Founded: 1978
- Status: Currently constituted
- Founder: Tun Syed Zahiruddin
- Grand Master: Tun Seri Setia Mohd Ali Rustam
- Grades: Grand Principal
- Post-nominals: D.U.N.M.

Precedence
- Next (higher): Premier and Faithful Exalted Order of Malacca
- Next (lower): Exalted Order of Malacca
- Ribbon bar

The Premier and Exalted Order of Malacca (Malay: Darjah Utama Negeri Melaka) is the second-highest state order of Malacca which is conferred by the Yang di-Pertua Negeri of Malacca. The order was the state's highest order until the establishment of the Premier and Faithful Exalted Order of Malacca by Yang di-Pertua Negeri Mohd Ali Rustam in 2020. The order was constituted in 1978 and amended in 2016. It is conferred in the single grade of Grand Principal (D.U.N.M.).

== History ==
The Premier and Exalted Order of Malacca was established by Yang di-Pertua Negeri Syed Zahiruddin in 1978 along with the Exalted Order of Malacca. The order was established as the highest state order and continued to be the highest order until the creation of the Premier and Faithful Exalted Order of Malacca by Yang di-Pertua Negeri Mohd Ali Rustam in 2020.

== Criteria ==
The Premier and Exalted Order of Malacca is conferred upon the Yang di-Pertua Negeri of Malacca who is also the sovereign of the order. As the sovereign, the Yang di-Pertua Negeri bestows the order upon other eminent individuals including the Yang di-Pertua Negeris of Sabah, Sarawak and Penang, the Prime Minister, the Deputy Prime Ministers and the Chief Minister of Malacca when deemed appropriate.

== Grades, post-nominals, and insignia ==
The Premier and Exalted Order of Malacca is conferred in the sole grade of Knight Grand Commander. All recipients of the order are entitled to bear the honorific prefix of "Datuk Seri Utama" while the wives of the male recipients are titled as "Datin Seri Utama". Husbands of the female recipients do not bear any style. All recipients bear the post-nominal letters of "D.U.N.M."

The recipients receive the insignia of the order upon their induction. The insignia comprises the riband of the order, a badge, a star and the collar.

== Recipients ==
- 1978: Syed Zahiruddin (Founder Grand Master)
- 1982: Mahathir Mohamad
- 1982: Musa Hitam
- 1984: Syed Ahmad Shahabuddin
- 1985: Tunku Abdul Rahman
- 1987: Sultan Salahuddin Al-Haj
- 1987: Ahmad Zaidi Adruce
- 1988: Sultan Iskandar
- 2003: Siti Hasmah Mohamad Ali
- 2004: Mohd Khalil Yaakob
- 2004: Abdullah Ahmad Badawi
- 2005: Abang Muhammad Salahuddin
- 2007: Najib Razak
- 2007: Zurina Kassim
- 2007: Jeanne Abdullah
- 2010: Rosmah Mansor
- 2015: Ahmad Zahid Hamidi
- 2016: Idris Haron
- 2019: Muhyiddin Yassin
- 2020: Mohd Ali Rustam
- 2020: Sulaiman Md Ali
- 2022: Ismail Sabri Yaakob
- 2023: Ab Rauf Yusoh
- 2025: Wan Ahmad Farid Wan Salleh

== See also ==
- Orders, decorations, and medals of the Malaysian states and federal territories#Malacca
- List of post-nominal letters (Malacca)
