= Mohd Zin Abdul Ghani =

Malaysian politician (1939–1997)

Yang Berbahagia Datuk Seri Mohd Zin Abdul Ghani DGSM PGDK PPN
- محمّد زين عبد الغني

7th Chief Minister of Malacca
- In office 14 October 1994 – 14 May 1997
- Governor: Syed Ahmad Syed Mahmud Shahabuddin
- Preceded by: Abdul Rahim Thamby Chik
- Succeeded by: Abu Zahar Ithnin

Member of the Malacca State Legislative Assembly for Melekek
- In office 1995–1997
- Preceded by: constituency renamed
- Succeeded by: Nawi Ahmad (BN–UMNO)

Member of the Malacca State Legislative Assembly for Kelemak
- In office 1986–1995
- Preceded by: Abdul Rahim Thamby Chik
- Succeeded by: constituency name changed

Personal details
- Born: 1939
- Died: 14 May 1997 (aged 57–58)
- Party: United Malays National Organisation (UMNO) (–1997)
- Other political affiliations: Barisan Nasional (BN) (–1997)
- Spouse(s): Fatimah Samdin (Died 19 October 2015) & Rosehani Ismail
- Children: Rozila Aini Binti Mohd Zin
- Occupation: Politician

Mohd Zin bin Abdul Ghani (1939 – 14 May 1997) was a Malaysian politician from Malacca. He was the Chief Minister of Malacca from 14 October 1994 to 14 May 1997.

== Political background ==
Mohd Zin successfully ran as Kelemak State Assemblyman. He was appointed as Chief Minister of Malacca to replace Abdul Rahim Thamby Chik who has resigned as Chief Minister following the involvement with a scandal involving an underage girl. He was swore in as a Chief Minister in front of the Yang di-Pertua Negeri of Malacca (Governor), Syed Ahmad Syed Mahmud Shahabuddin.

As Chief Minister, he also led the Malacca Customary Land Development Corporation (PERTAM). The Malacca State Cultured Seminary was held on 16 April 1996 in collaboration with the Chief Minister and was officially opened by then-Deputy Prime Minister of Malaysia, Anwar Ibrahim. He was also involved in the opening of the National Arts Day on 27 May 1995, the inauguration of the Museum of Arts 28 May 1995 and the launch of Munshi Abdullah speech organized by the Melaka Malay 9 December 1995.

== Controversies and issues ==
During his administration, there was talk of privatization Malacca Water Corporation (PAM) (now Syarikat Air Melaka (SAMB)) to Gibca Holdings Sdn. Bhd. and the agreement should be signed in May 1997. However the privatisation was postponed following the death of Mohd Zin on 14 May 1997.

On 11 April 1998, Mohd Zin's name was linked to a fraud case involving the former Malacca State Government Secretary, Abdul Rahman Jamal regarding the Sports Complex project in Paya Rumput worth (RM260 million). Abdul Rahman claimed that he was instructed by the former Chief Minister of Malacca, Mohd Zin Abdul Ghani to write a letter of recommendation for the approval of the Ministry of Finance.

== Death ==
Mohd Zin died on 14 May 1997 in Tawakkal Hospital, Kuala Lumpur at the age of 58. He was later buried at Kampung Pengkalan Muslim Cemetery in his hometown of Alor Gajah, Melaka. After Zin's death, he was replaced by Abu Zahar Ithnin as a Chief Minister. A by-election was held after his death.

== Election results ==
Malacca State Legislative Assembly
Year	Constituency	Candidate	Votes	Pct	Opponent(s)	Votes	Pct	Ballots cast	Majority	Turnout
1986	N04 Kelemak	Mohd Zin Abdul Ghani (UMNO)	5,477	86.09%	Jalil Mohamed Isa (PAS)	885	13.91%	6,602	4,592	68.81%
1990	N04 Kelemak	Mohd Zin Abdul Ghani (UMNO)	6,420	87.82%	Abdul Karim Mohamed Said (PAS)	890	12.18%	7,568	5,530	75.46%
1995	N03 Melekek	Mohd Zin Abdul Ghani (UMNO)	5,086	88.65%	Mohd Yusof Osman (PAS)	515	8.97%	5,737	4,571	73.03%

== Honours ==
- Malaysia
  - Member of the Order of the Defender of the Realm (AMN) (1986)
  - Medal of the Order of the Defender of the Realm (PPN) (1980)
- Malacca
  - Grand Commander of the Exalted Order of Malacca (DGSM) – Datuk Seri (1994)
  - Companion of the Exalted Order of Malacca (DMSM) – Datuk (1988)
- Sabah
  - Commander of the Order of Kinabalu (PGDK) – Datuk (1996)

== Memorials ==
=== Alor Gajah ===
- The Pengkalan Intersection at AMJ Highway (Federal Route 19) was renamed as Datuk Seri Mohd Zin Intersection.
- Jalan Tampin on Federal Route 61 was renamed as Jalan Datuk Mohd Zin.
- Sekolah Menengah Teknik Datuk Seri Mohd Zin, a secondary school.
- Kolej Vokasional Datuk Seri Mohd Zin, a vocational college at Kampung Pengkalan.

=== Melaka City/Batu Berendam ===
- Jalan Datuk Mohd Zin, a major road in Batu Berendam.
