= Gunn Chit Tuan =

Malaysian jurist

- Born: 21 May 1929; Kuala Lumpur, Malaysia
- Died: 18 May 2013 (aged 83)
- Education: Peterhouse, Cambridge University
- Occupation: Chief Justice
- Known for: Chief Justice of the High Court in Malaya
- Honors: Companion of the Order of Loyalty to the Crown of Malaysia (J.S.M.) (1973); Commander of the Order of Loyalty to the Crown of Malaysia (P.S.M.) - Tan Sri (1991); Commander of the Order of the Defender of the Realm (P.M.N.) - Tan Sri (1994)

Gunn Chit Tuan (21 May 1929 – 18 May 2013) was a Chief Justice of the High Court in Malaya, serving on the Supreme Court of Malaysia, High Court of Malaysia as well as in the Judicial and Legal Service as Senior Federal Counsel, Assistant Parliamentary Draftsman and President of the Sessions Court and Assistant District Officer in the Malayan Civil Service. He presided over the landmark case Commonwealth of Australia v Midforth (Malaysia) Sdn Bhd, which recognized that common law would still be applicalble after the statutory cutoff date of 7 April 1956. He retired from the court in 1994.

== Life ==
Tan Sri Gunn Chit Tuan was born in Kuala Lumpur on 21 May 1929.

He received his early education at Batu Road School and Victoria Institution before the Japanese occupation in 1941. He went on to read law at Peterhouse, Cambridge. Contemporary classmates include Lee Kuan Yew, Kwa Geok Choo (later Mrs Lee Kuan Yew), Yong Pung How, Eddie Barker, and Raja Tun Mohar Raja Badiozaman.

He was called to the English Bar by the Honourable Society of Lincoln's Inn in November 1952. He was admitted to the Malayan Bar in November 1953 and joined the firm SM Yong & Co.

== Career ==
He joined the Malayan Civil Service as an Assistant District Officer, and in 1958 joined the Judicial and Legal Service. There he served as President of the Sessions Court, Assistant Parliamentary Draftsman, and Senior Federal Counsel.

On 15 Jan 1977 he was elevated to the High Court in Malaya, the third highest court, the first being the Privy Council in the UK, and then the Federal Court.

In 1987 he was appointed to the Federal Court, now called the Supreme Court. In 1992 he became the Chief Justice of the High Court in Malaya.

== Significant cases ==
- Commonwealth of Australia v Midforth (Malaysia) Sdn Bhd

== Honours ==
- Malaysia :
  - Companion of the Order of Loyalty to the Crown of Malaysia (J.S.M.) (1973)
  - Commander of the Order of Loyalty to the Crown of Malaysia (P.S.M.) - Tan Sri (1991)
  - Commander of the Order of the Defender of the Realm (P.M.N.) - Tan Sri (1994)
