= Syed Ahmad Shahabuddin =

Malaysian politician

Yang Amat Berbahagia Tun Datuk Seri Utama Syed Ahmad Shahabuddin SMN SSM DUNM SPMS SPMK SSDK DP SPDK PNBS PGDK JMN JP

5th Yang di-Pertua Negeri of Malacca
- In office 4 December 1984 – 3 June 2004
- Chief Minister: Abdul Rahim Thamby Chik; Mohd Zin Abdul Ghani; Abu Zahar Ithnin; Mohd Ali Rustam
- Preceded by: Syed Zahiruddin
- Succeeded by: Mohd Khalil Yaakob

4th Menteri Besar of Kedah
- In office 14 December 1967 – 13 July 1978
- Monarch: Abdul Halim
- Preceded by: Syed Omar Syed Abdullah Shahabuddin
- Succeeded by: Syed Nahar Syed Sheh Shahabuddin

Personal details
- Born: Syed Ahmad bin Syed Mahmud Shahabuddin; 4 May 1925 Kulim, Kedah, Unfederated Malay States, British Malaya (now Malaysia)
- Died: 7 July 2008 (aged 83) Kuala Lumpur, Malaysia
- Resting place: Makam Pahlawan Negeri, Masjid Al Azim, Malacca
- Party: United Malays National Organisation (UMNO)
- Other political affiliations: Alliance; Barisan Nasional (BN)
- Spouse(s): Sharifah Haniffah Syed Alwi (died 1993); Marfuza Sheikh Mohd Osman
- Children: 10
- Education: Kolej Sultan Abdul Hamid

Syed Ahmad bin Syed Mahmud Shahabuddin (4 May 1925 – 7 July 2008) was a Malaysian politician. He was the Menteri Besar of Kedah from 1967 to 1978 and the fifth Yang di-Pertua Negeri (Governor) of Melaka state from 1984 until 2004, the longest-serving governor of Malacca.

== Life ==
Syed Ahmad was born on 4 May 1925 in Kulim, Kedah, Malaysia. He was the third son of five brothers and sisters. Syed Ahmad received his early education at Sekolah Melayu Kulim (Kulim Malay School) in 1932 till 1935 and continued his education at the Sultan Abdul Hamid College, Alor Star till he passed his Senior Cambridge Examination in 1947.

Syed Ahmad had wide experience and actively engaged in politics. He was the Kedah UMNO Assistant Secretary (1951–1954), Secretary Kedah UMNO (1954–1967), chairman, UMNO State Liaison Committee and Kedah National Front (1967–1978), UMNO Supreme Council Member (1968–1978), and deputy chairman, UMNO State Liaison Committee and Kedah National Front (1978–1984).

Syed Ahmad was appointed as Menteri Besar of Kedah (1967–1978) and Deputy Minister, Ministry of Home Affairs (1978–1982) and Malaysia's High Commissioner to Singapore (1982–1984). In 1984, he was appointed as the fifth Yang di-Pertua Negeri (Governor) of Melaka state.

Syed Ahmad married Toh Puan Sharifah Haniffah Syed Alwi in 1950 and they had six children. Toh Puan died on 5 July 1993 in Kuala Lumpur. In 1960, H.E. Tun married Toh Puan Datuk Seri Datin Seri Utama Marfuza Sheikh Mohd Osman and they had 4 children.

== Death ==
Syed Ahmad died on 7 July 2008 at his house in Taman Tun Dr Ismail, Kuala Lumpur. He was 83 years old. His body was buried at Melaka's State Heroes Mausoleum (Makam Pahlawan Negeri) near Al Azim Mosque in Malacca Town, Melaka. He was the first state leader to be buried there.

== Legacy ==
- The Sekolah Kebangsaan Tun Syed Ahmad Shahabuddin at Hang Tuah Jaya, Ayer Keroh was named after him.
- The Sekolah Menengah Kebangsaan Syed Ahmad at Kuala Nerang was also named after him.
- There is the mosque Masjid Tun Syed Ahmad Al-Haj in Bukit Beruang, Melaka was named after him.

== Honours and titles ==
He was awarded :

=== Titles ===
He held the title of "Tun Datuk Seri Utama" by combination of his highest Federal Malaysian title "Tun" (SMN) and his highest Malaccan title "Datuk Seri Utama" (DUNM)
In other states of Malaysia, a similar combination between his highest Federal Malaysian title "Tun" (SMN) and his local highest title may be used. Example: Tun Datuk Seri Panglima in Sabah.

=== Honours of Malacca ===
- As 5th Yang di-Pertua Negeri of Malacca (4 December 1984 – 3 June 2004)
  - Grand Master and Grand Commander of the Premier and Exalted Order of Malacca (DUNM) with title Datuk Seri Utama
  - Grand Master of the Exalted Order of Malacca

=== Honours of Malaysia ===
- Malaya
  - Companion of the Order of the Defender of the Realm (JMN) (1958)
- Malaysia
  - Recipient of the Malaysian Commemorative Medal (Silver) (PPM) (1965)
  - Commander of the Order of Loyalty to the Crown of Malaysia (PSM) – Tan Sri (1979)
  - Grand Commander of the Order of Loyalty to the Crown of Malaysia (SSM) – Tun (1987)
  - Grand Commander Order of the Defender of the Realm (SMN) – Tun (1989)
- Kedah
  - Justice of the peace (JP) of Kedah
  - Companion of the Order of the Crown of Kedah (SMK) (1965)
  - Knight Grand Commander of the Order of the Crown of Kedah (SPMK) – Dato' Seri (1968)
  - Knight Grand Companion of the Order of Loyalty to the Royal House of Kedah (SSDK) – Dato' Seri (1976)
- Selangor
  - Knight Grand Commander of the Order of the Crown of Selangor (SPMS) – Dato' Seri (1989)
- Sarawak
  - Knight Commander of the Order of the Star of Sarawak (PNBS) – Dato Sri
  - Knight Grand Commander of the Order of the Star of Hornbill Sarawak (DP) – Datuk Patinggi (1988)
- Sabah
  - Commander of the Order of Kinabalu (PGDK) – Datuk (1975)
  - Grand Commander of the Order of Kinabalu (SPDK) – Datuk Seri Panglima (1996)

Preceded by Syed Zahiruddin Syed Hassan	Yang di-Pertua Negeri of Malacca; 1984–2004	Succeeded by Mohd Khalil Yaakob
