= Abdul Jamil Abdul Rais =

Malaysian civil servant (1912–1994)

Yang Berbahagia Tan Sri Dato' Seri Abdul Jamil Abdul Rais PMN SPCM SPMS PJK
- عبدالجميل عبدالرئيس
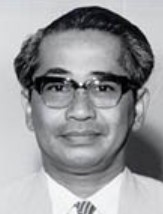

2nd Chief Secretary to the Government of Malaysia
- In office 1 September 1965 – 6 November 1967
- Preceded by: Abdul Aziz Abdul Majid
- Succeeded by: Tunku Mohamad Tunku Besar Burhanuddin

7th Menteri Besar of Selangor
- In office 1958 – May 1959
- Monarch: Hisamuddin
- Preceded by: Muhammad Ismail Abdul Latiff
- Succeeded by: Abu Bakar Baginda

Personal details
- Born: 14 January 1912 Kuala Kangsar, Perak, Federated Malay States
- Died: 12 July 1994 (aged 82) Kuala Lumpur, Malaysia
- Spouse: Puan Sri Datin Seri Norhimah Haji Khalid (m. 1936)
- Children: 11 (4 sons, 7 daughters)

Abdul Jamil bin Abdul Rais (14 January 1912–12 July 1994) is a former Malaysian civil servant who served as Menteri Besar of Selangor and Chief Secretary to the Government of Malaysia.

== Early life ==
Abdul Jamil Abdul Rais was born on 14 January 1912 in Kuala Kangsar, Perak. He received his early education at Hugh Clifford Secondary School, Kuala Kangsar; Malay College Kuala Kangsar (1931), before continuing his studies at Oxford University, England (1952-1953) majoring in agricultural economics. He continued his studies after receiving scholarships from the Queen.

== Career ==
He first served in the Malayan Administration Service at the Land and District Office in July 1932. As a Trainee Officer (Probationer Officer) M.A.S and placed in the Kuala Selangor District Office (1932), in the Sabak Bernam District Office, Selangor (1933). His career in this field became brighter when he worked at the Port Dickson District Office and later became Deputy Assistant District Officer (D.A.D.O) in Hulu Selangor (1938) and Deputy Assistant District Officer in Hilir Perak (1939-1941) when the Second World War broke out and Malaya was taken over by the Japanese for several years.

During Japan, he was active in the anti -Japanese movement through the Force 136 guerrilla force and was once captured by the Japanese. During the Japanese surrender to the British army, he was again captured by the CPM communists.

After World War II ended, he became Commissioner of Lands and Mines of Perlis (1948-1951); Perlis State Secretary (1951-1954); Selangor State Financial Officer (1954-1955); Selangor state secretary (1956) and Menteri Besar Selangor (1958-1959). After independence in 1957, in 1958-1959 Tunku Abdul Rahman chose him to be the Menteri Besar of Selangor.

Later in 1961-1964 he was appointed Secretary of the National Treasury / Secretary General of the Ministry of Finance. After that he became Permanent Secretary in the Prime Minister's Department and Cabinet Secretary (1964-1967). The Minister of Finance at that time was Tun Tan Siew Sin. He was also involved in planning the Malaysia Five Year Plan 1951-1965 with Tunku Abdul Rahman, Mohamed bin Baba and Raja Mohar Badiozaman etc. Jamil Rais as the chairman of the NDPC was commended for his good work in drafting the Malaysia Plan.

He became the Assistant State Secretary of Selangor (30 June 1956); Menteri Besar of Selangor (1957) for a term of four months and then appointed into the post after Malaya achieved Independence in August 1957. On 8 June 1958 he traveled the world for 3 months. Upon his return from the visit, he continued to hold the post of Selangor Menteri Besar. In 1959, he was assigned to the Malaysian Treasury. Secretary of the National Treasury (1961) and was the first Malay to hold the post. He was appointed the first Chief Secretary to the Government (1964). This position was renamed to the Permanent Secretary of the Prime Minister's Department and he was the person responsible for changing the name of the position in accordance with his duties.

At the same time, he held the position of Secretary to the Cabinet. In 1967, he was appointed Malaysian High Commissioner to London and also ambassador to Ireland.

27 years after his retirement from civil service in 1994, he died at age 82.

== Honours ==
- Malaya :
  - Companion of the Order of the Defender of the Realm (JMN) (1959)
  - Commander of the Order of the Defender of the Realm (PMN) – Tan Sri (1962)
- Malaysia :
  - Recipient of the Malaysian Commemorative Medal (gold) (PPM) (1965)
- Selangor :
  - Recipient of Meritorious Service Medal (silver medal) (PJK) (1956)
  - Knight Grand Commander of the Order of the Crown of Selangor (SPMS) – Dato' Seri (1979)
- Perak :
  - Knight Grand Commander of the Order of Cura Si Manja Kini (SPCM) – Dato' Seri (1993)
