= Surin Upatkoon =

Thai billionaire

Surin Upatkoon (Thai: สุรินทร์ อุภัทกุล; RTGS: Surin Uphatkun, Chinese: 劉錦坤) is a Thai billionaire. He made his fortune in a diversified range of industries, from telecom to lotteries. Most derive from his realized stake in Intouch Holdings. He started his business career in 1971 at a weaving firm. He graduated from Han Chiang High School. He resides primarily in Kuala Lumpur.

== Honours ==
=== Foreign honours ===
- Malaysia
  - Honorary Commander of the Order of Loyalty to the Crown of Malaysia (PSM) – Tan Sri (2012)
- Penang
  - Companion of the Order of the Defender of State (DMPN) – Dato' (2011)
