= Mohd Ali Rustam =

Malaysian politician

Tuan Yang Terutama Tun Seri Setia Mohd. Ali Mohd. Rustam SMN SPSM SPDK SUMW DUPN DUNM PSM DGSM DCSM DMSM DSM PBM
- محمد علي بن محمد رستم
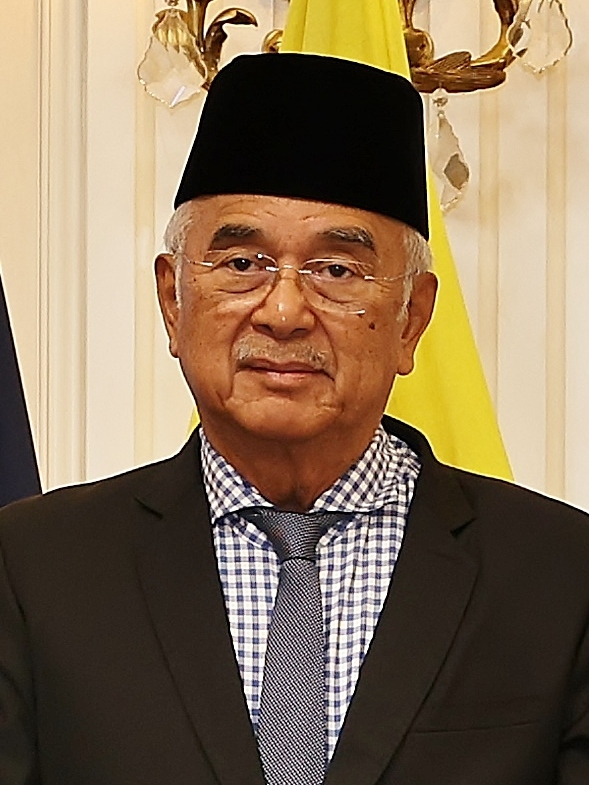
- Mohd Ali in 2026

7th Yang di-Pertua Negeri of Malacca
- Incumbent
- Assumed office 4 June 2020
- Chief Minister: Sulaiman Md Ali (2020–2023); Ab Rauf Yusoh (since 2023)
- Preceded by: Mohd Khalil Yaakob

9th Chief Minister of Malacca
- In office 3 December 1999 – 7 May 2013
- Governor: Syed Ahmad Syed Mahmud Shahabuddin; Mohd Khalil Yaakob
- Preceded by: Abu Zahar Ithnin
- Succeeded by: Idris Haron
- Constituency: Paya Rumput; Bukit Batu

Deputy Minister of Health
- In office 12 November 1996 – 14 December 1999
- Monarchs: Ja'afar; Salahuddin
- Prime Minister: Mahathir Mohamad
- Minister: Chua Jui Meng
- Preceded by: Siti Zaharah Sulaiman
- Succeeded by: Suleiman Mohamed
- Constituency: Batu Berendam

Deputy Minister of Transport
- In office 8 May 1995 – 12 November 1996
- Monarch: Ja'afar
- Prime Minister: Mahathir Mohamad
- Minister: Ling Liong Sik
- Preceded by: Zaleha Ismail
- Succeeded by: Ibrahim Saad
- Constituency: Batu Berendam

Member of the Malaysian Parliament for Batu Berendam
- In office 26 April 1995 – 29 November 1999
- Preceded by: Mohd Tamrin Tun Haji Abdul Ghafar (BN–UMNO)
- Succeeded by: Abdul Ghafar Baba (BN–UMNO)
- Majority: 22,175 (1995)

Member of the Malacca State Legislative Assembly for Bukit Baru
- In office 21 March 2004 – 5 May 2013
- Preceded by: Position established
- Succeeded by: Md Khalid Kassim (PAS)
- Majority: 5,992 (2004); 2,708 (2008)

Member of the Malacca State Legislative Assembly for Paya Rumput
- In office 29 November 1999 – 21 March 2004
- Preceded by: Yasin Mohd Sarif (BN–UMNO)
- Succeeded by: Tahir Hassan (BN–UMNO)
- Majority: 2,876 (1999)

Member of the Malacca State Legislative Assembly for Sungai Udang
- In office 21 October 1990 – 25 April 1995
- Preceded by: Ahmad Nordin Mohd Amin (BN–UMNO)
- Succeeded by: Noordin Yaani (BN–UMNO)
- Majority: 6,608 (1990)

Member of the Malacca State Legislative Assembly for Ayer Molek
- In office 4 August 1986 – 21 October 1990
- Preceded by: Mohd Tamrin Abdul Ghafar (BN–UMNO)
- Succeeded by: As'ari Ibrahim (BN–UMNO)
- Majority: 7,069 (1986)

Personal details
- Born: Mohd Ali bin Mohd Rustam; 24 August 1949 (age 77) Malacca, Federation of Malaya (now Malaysia)
- Citizenship: Malaysian
- Party: United Malays National Organisation (UMNO) (1968–2020)
- Other political affiliations: Alliance (1968–1973); Barisan Nasional (BN) (1974–2020)
- Spouse: Asmah Abdul Rahman
- Children: 3 children (include Mohd Ridhwan Mohd Ali )
- Education: University of Science Malaysia (BA); University of Malaya (MA,Phd)
- Occupation: Politician

Mohd. Ali bin Mohd. Rustam (Jawi: محمد علي بن محمد رستم; born 24 August 1949) is a Malaysian politician who has served as the 7th Yang di-Pertua Negeri of Malacca since June 2020. He served as the 9th Chief Minister of Malacca from December 1999 to May 2013, Deputy Minister of Health from November 1996 to December 1999, Deputy Minister of Transport from May 1995 to November 1996, Member of Parliament (MP) for Batu Berendam from April 1995 to November 1999, Member of the Malacca State Legislative Assembly (MLA) for Bukit Batu from March 2004 to May 2013, for Paya Rumput from November 1999 to March 2004, for Sungai Udang from October 1990 to April 1995 and for Ayer Molek from August 1986 to October 1990. He was a member of the United Malays National Organisation (UMNO), a component party of the Barisan Nasional (BN) coalition.

== Early life and education ==
Mohd Ali was born in Kampung Bukit Katil, Malacca on 24 August 1949. He got his first education at Sekolah Kebangsaan Bukit Katil and Sekolah Kebangsaan Semabok and continued his secondary education at Malacca High School. He got his tertiary education with Bachelor of Social Science at Universiti Sains Malaysia (USM).

He was awarded a Doctorate in History and Archeology from the Faculty of Arts and Social Sciences, University of Malaya for his research completion on "The Government's Role in Empowering Leadership and Socioeconomics of Youth in Malaysia, 1963-2013." Mohd Ali received his doctorate from UM Chancellor, Sultan Nazrin Muizzuddin Shah, on the first day of the university's 63rd Convocation ceremony.

== Political career ==
Mohd Ali joined UMNO in 1968 and became its vice-president from 2004 to 2009. He has been an elected representative in Malacca since 1986 and became Chief Minister on 3 December 1999 for fourteen years.

He was a member of the Dewan Rakyat for Batu Berendam from 1995 to 1999 and tried to contest in Bukit Katil (later Hang Tuah Jaya) in 2013 and 2018 general elections but lost both to Shamsul Iskandar Md Akin from People's Justice Party.

Mohd Ali is also president of the Malaysian Silat Federation (PESAKA), Malaysian Karate Federation and of Dunia Melayu Dunia Islam.

=== Chief Minister of Malacca (1999-2013) ===
Malacca became a fully developed state in 2010 under the leadership of Mohd Ali. This news came after Malacca fulfilled 32 indicators of development specified by Organization for Economic Cooperation and Development. Other contributions done by Mohd Ali include Melaka River Cruise, Melaka Straits Mosque and Taming Sari Tower.

=== Yang di-Pertua Negeri of Malacca (since 2020) ===
Mohd Ali entered the office of the Yang di-Pertua Negeri of Malacca on 5 June 2020 replacing Mohd Khalil Yaakob who ended his sixteen-year tenure as the Yang di-Pertua Negeri of Malacca and was reappointed for second term on 28 May 2024. He is the first native Malaccan to hold the highest post.

== Election results ==
Malacca State Legislative Assembly
Year	Constituency	Candidate	Votes	Pct	Opponent(s)	Votes	Pct	Ballots cast	Majority	Turnout
1986	N09 Ayer Molek	Mohd Ali Rustam (UMNO)	9,484	76.28%	Husin Kassim (PAS)	2,415	19.42%	12,433	7,069	75.38%
1990	N12 Sungai Udang	Mohd Ali Rustam (UMNO)	12,073	68.84%	Ahmad Nordin Mohd Amin (S46)	5,465	31.16%	18,659	6,608	77.68%
1999	N12 Paya Rumput	Mohd Ali Rustam (UMNO)	8,632	58.31%	Loo Ah Boo (DAP)	5,756	38.88%	14,803	2,876	78.53%
2004	N17 Bukit Baru	Mohd Ali Rustam (UMNO)	8,258	76.69%	Bakrin Sidek (PAS)	2,266	21.04%	10,768	5,992	79.71%
2008	N17 Bukit Baru	Mohd Ali Rustam (UMNO)	7,644	59.51%	Bakrin Sidek (PAS)	4,936	38.43%	12,845	2,708	80.77%

Parliament of Malaysia
Year	Constituency	Candidate	Votes	Pct	Opponent(s)	Votes	Pct	Ballots cast	Majority	Turnout
1995	P122 Batu Berendam	Mohd Ali Rustam (UMNO)	37,846	62.19%	Tan Seng Seng (DAP)	15,671	25.75%	62,528	22,175	78.30%
1995	P122 Batu Berendam	Mohd Ali Rustam (UMNO)	37,846	62.19%	Mohd. Nor Jaafar (PAS)	7,335	12.05%	62,528	22,175	78.30%
2013	P137 Bukit Katil	Mohd Ali Rustam (UMNO)	40,720	46.70%	Shamsul Iskandar Mohd Akin (PKR)	46,167	53.30%	88,271	5,733	88.77%
2018	P137 Hang Tuah Jaya	Mohd Ali Rustam (UMNO)	30,427	39.73%	Shamsul Iskandar Mohd Akin (PKR)	39,067	51.01%	76,583	8,640	86.72%
2018	P137 Hang Tuah Jaya	Mohd Ali Rustam (UMNO)	30,427	39.73%	Md Khalid Kassim (PAS)	7,089	9.26%	76,583	8,640	86.72%

== Honours ==
=== Honours of Malaysia ===
- Malaysia
  - Grand Commander of the Order of the Defender of the Realm (SMN) – Tun (2020)
  - Commander of the Order of Loyalty to the Crown of Malaysia (PSM) – Tan Sri (2014)
- Malacca
  - Founding Grand Master and Grand Principal of the Premier and Faithful Exalted Order of Malacca (SPSM) – Seri Setia (2020)
  - Grand Principal of the Premier and Exalted Order of Malacca (DUNM) – Datuk Seri Utama (2020)
  - Grand Commander of the Exalted Order of Malacca (DGSM) – Datuk Seri (2001)
  - Commander of the Exalted Order of Malacca (DCSM) – Datuk Wira (1995)
  - Companion of the Exalted Order of Malacca (DMSM) – Datuk (1989)
  - Member of the Exalted Order of Malacca (DSM)
  - Recipient of the Community Service Medal (PBM) (1982)
- Sabah
  - Grand Commander of the Order of Kinabalu (SPDK) – Datuk Seri Panglima (2005)
- Federal Territory (Malaysia) :
  - Grand Principal of the Order of the Territorial Crown (SUMW) – Datuk Seri Utama (2021)
- Penang
  - Grand Principal of the Order of the Defender of State (DUPN) – Dato' Seri Utama (2021)
- Perlis
  - Recipient of Tuanku Syed Sirajuddin Jamalullail Silver Jubilee Medal (2025)

=== Honorary degrees ===
- Malaysia
  - Honorary Ph.D. degree from Universiti Teknikal Malaysia Melaka (2003)
  - Honorary Ph.D. degree in Management from Multimedia University (2011)

Preceded by Mohd Khalil Yaakob	Yang di-Pertua Negeri of Malacca; 2020 – present	Incumbent

Preceded by Abu Zahar Ithnin	Chief Minister of Malacca; 1999 - 2013	Succeeded by Idris Haron
