= Abdul Malek Yusuf =

Malayan politician (1899–1977)

Yang Amat Berbahagia Tun Abdul Malek Yusuf SMN
- عبدالملک يوسف

2nd Yang di-Pertua Negeri of Malacca
- In office 31 August 1959 – 30 August 1971
- Preceded by: Leong Yew Koh
- Succeeded by: Abdul Aziz Abdul Majid

Personal details
- Born: Abdul Malek bin Yusuf; 9 August 1899 Kampung Chengkau, Rembau, Negeri Sembilan, Federated Malay States, British Malaya (now Malaysia)
- Died: 6 July 1977 (aged 77) Kuala Lumpur, Malaysia
- Resting place: Jalan Ampang Muslim Cemetery, Kuala Lumpur
- Spouse(s): Khatijah Ahmad; Fatimah Ismail

Tun Abdul Malek bin Yusuf (9 August 1899 – 6 July 1977) was the Yang di-Pertua Negeri of Malacca from 1959 to 1971. His 66th birthday was celebrated on 9 August 1965 with a public holiday in the state.

== Honours ==
=== Honour of Malaya ===
- Negeri Sembilan
  - Dato' Maha Kurnia
- Malaya
  - Grand Commander of the Order of the Defender of the Realm (SMN) – Tun (1961)
- Kelantan
  - Gold medal of the Sultan Yahya Petra Coronation Medal (1961)

Preceded by Leong Yew Koh	Yang di-Pertua Negeri of Malacca; 1959–1971	Succeeded by Abdul Aziz Abdul Majid
