= Lim Kok Wing =

Malaysian business magnate (1945–2021)

Yang Berbahagia Tan Sri Dato' Sri Lim Kok Wing PSM SSAP DGSM PNBS DHMS DPMS JSM AMN
- Born: 21 October 1945; Kuala Lumpur, Selangor, British Military Administration of Malaya
- Died: 1 June 2021 (aged 75)
- Occupations: Business magnate, philanthropist, educator, illustrator

Lim Kok Wing
- Traditional Chinese: 林國榮
- Simplified Chinese: 林国荣
Transcriptions
Standard Mandarin
- Hanyu Pinyin: Lín Guóróng
Yue: Cantonese
- Jyutping: Lam^{4} Gwok^{3} Wing^{4}
Southern Min
- Hokkien POJ: Lîm Kok-êng

Lim Kok Wing (Chinese: 林國榮; 1945 – 1 June 2021) was a Malaysian businessman, philanthropist, educator, and illustrator. He was the founding president of the Limkokwing University of Creative Technology.

== Early life ==
Lim was born on 21 October 1945 in Kuala Lumpur, Malaysia. He attended Methodist Boys School and Cochrane Road Secondary School.

== Career ==
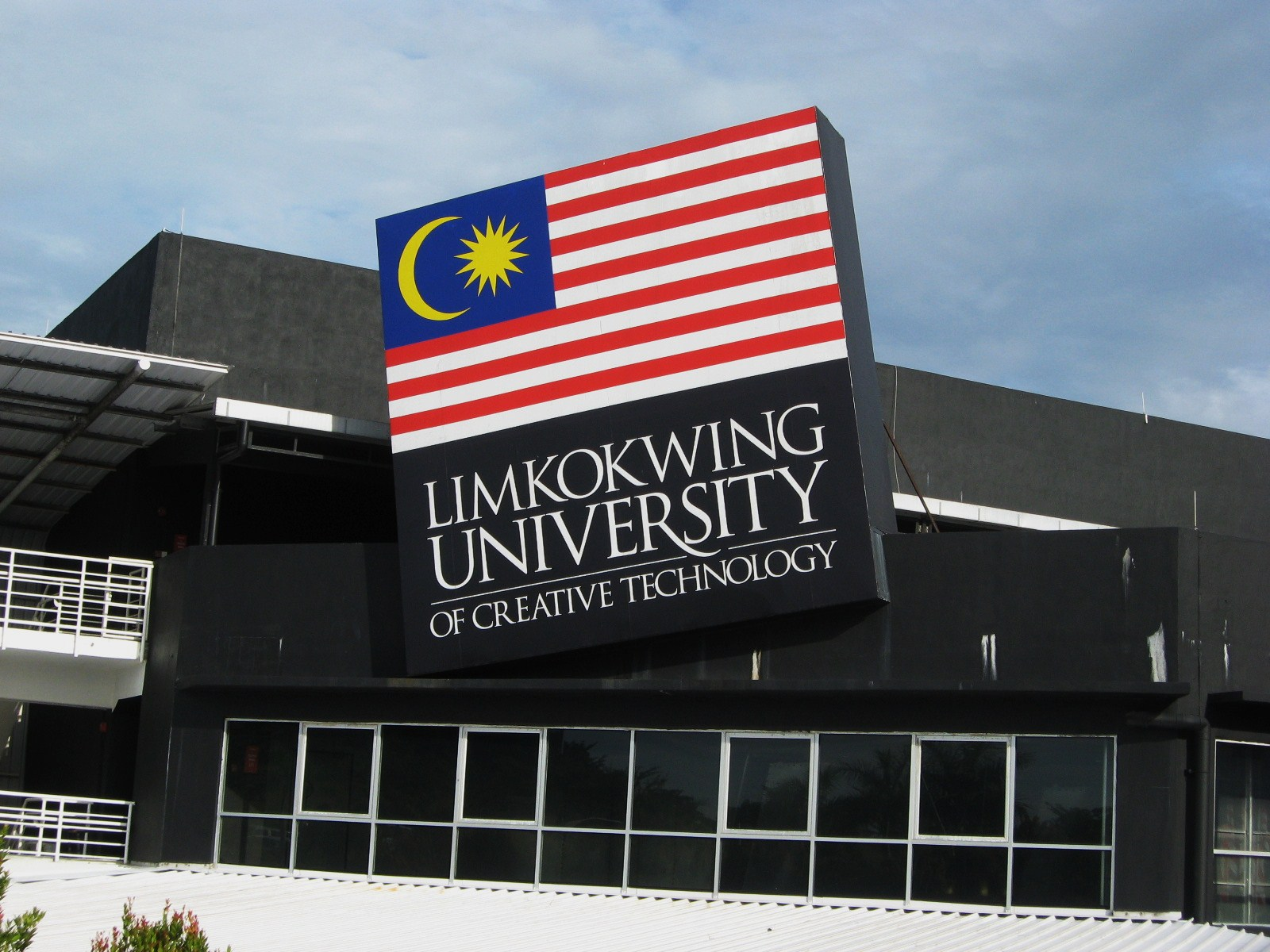
The Limkokwing University of Creative Technology in Cyberjaya, Malaysia, photographed in December 2007.

In 1975, at age 29, Lim established advertising firm Wings Creative Consultants. In 1992, he founded the Limkokwing University of Creative Technology in Cyberjaya. He also served as its president. In July 2007, following the establishment of Limkokwing University Botswana, Lim addressed the country's Parliament. The same year, Limkokwing University London was founded. In June 2020, the Limkokwing University of Creative Technology commissioned a billboard depicting Lim as "King of Africa," flanked by a cheetah and surrounded by African students; it was removed after receiving negative online responses.

== Death ==
Lim died on 1 June 2021, aged 75. He had been hospitalised the previous week after falling at home. Local newspaper The Star described him as "one of the most prominent figures in the higher education sector", while the Unesco Institute for Information Technologies in Education (IITE) called Lim a "great figure in education and philanthropy". Mahathir Mohamad remarked that Lim was an "avid supporter of the Malaysian vision", whereas Najib Razak noted that he "transformed the lives of many".

== Recognition ==
Lim received several awards for both his entrepreneurship and philanthropy. In 2006, he was named CEO of the Year by the Malaysia Canada Business Council. In 2007, he was awarded an honorary professorship by the Moscow Academy of the State and Municipal Management.

== Honours ==
- Malaysia :
  - Commander of the Order of Loyalty to the Crown of Malaysia (PSM) – Tan Sri (1995)
  - Companion of the Order of Loyalty to the Crown of Malaysia (JSM) (1989)
  - Member of the Order of the Defender of the Realm (AMN) (1982)
- Kedah :
  - Knight Commander of the Order of Loyalty to Sultan Abdul Halim Mu'adzam Shah (DHMS) – Dato' Paduka (2012)
- Malacca :
  - Grand Commander of the Exalted Order of Malacca (DGSM) – Datuk Seri (2016)
- Pahang :
  - Grand Knight of the Order of Sultan Ahmad Shah of Pahang (SSAP) – Dato' Sri (2009)
- Sarawak :
  - Knight Commander of the Most Exalted Order of the Star of Sarawak (PNBS) – Dato Sri (2013)
- Selangor :
  - Knight Commander of the Order of the Crown of Selangor (DPMS) – Dato'
