= Leong Yew Koh =

Malaysian politician

Yang Amat Berbahagia Major General Tun Leong Yew Koh SMN
- 梁宇皋
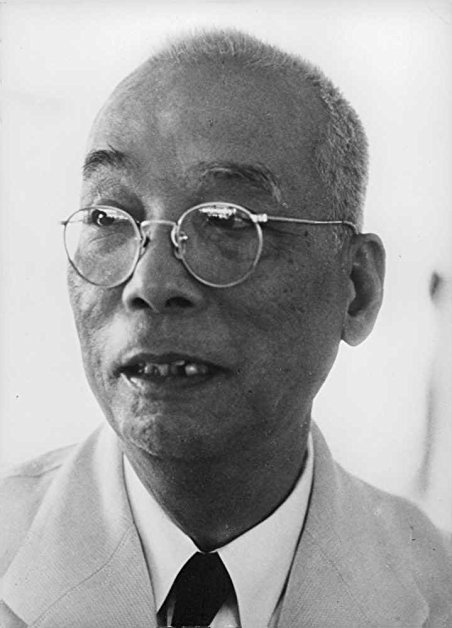
- Leong c. 1950s

Minister of Justice
- In office 12 September 1959 – 12 January 1963
- Monarchs: Abdul Rahman; Hisamuddin; Putra
- Prime Minister: Tunku Abdul Rahman
- Preceded by: Suleiman Abdul Rahman
- Succeeded by: Ismail Abdul Rahman

1st Yang di-Pertua Negeri of Malacca
- In office 31 August 1957 – 30 August 1959
- Chief Minister: Osman Talib; Abdul Ghafar Baba
- Preceded by: Office established
- Succeeded by: Abdul Malek Yusuf

Personal details
- Born: 22 August 1888 Sungai Siput, Kuala Kangsar, Perak, Federated Malay States, British Malaya
- Died: 12 January 1963 (aged 74) Petaling Jaya, Selangor, Federation of Malaya
- Party: Malayan Chinese Association (MCA)
- Spouse: Ho York Ling
- Children: 6
- Education: University of London
- Occupation: MCA Secretary-General (1952–1957)

Leong Yew Koh (Chinese: 梁宇皋; pinyin: Liáng Yǔgāo; Jyutping: Loeng4 Jyu5 Gou1; 22 August 1888 – 12 January 1963) was a Malayan politician who served as the 1st Yang di-Pertua Negeri of Malacca from the independence of the Federation of Malaya in August 1957 to August 1959 and Minister of Health from 1955 to 1956, Minister of Health and Social Welfare from 1956 to 1957 and Minister of Justice from 1959 to his death in January 1963. He was a Kuomintang member himself, serving under the Republic of China government from 1932 and later becoming the leader of the Overseas Chinese Anti-Japanese Army branch in Perak from 1942 until 1945, he was one of the founders of the Malayan Chinese Association (MCA) in 1949 and the party's first secretary-general.

== Early life and background ==
Born in Salak Utara, Sungai Siput, Kuala Kangsar, Perak on 22 August 1888, Leong was the son of Leong Yew Teen, a Chinese migrant tin miner of Cantonese descent, who was responsible for developing Salak Utara.

He went to Canton for his early education. At age 13, he came back to Malaya from China and studied in Anglo-Chinese School Ipoh and St Xavier's Institution, Penang. At age 16, he joined Tongmenghui Singapore.

He went to the University of London in 1908, studying economics, sociology, political science and law. He graduated in 1912 with an LLB.

== Further career ==
=== Malayan bar ===
He was called to the bar in 1920 and served as an advocate and solicitor in the Federated Malay States (FMS) and was also a member of the FMS Bar Committee until his resignation in 1932.

=== Republic of China ===
In 1932, Leong returned to China and served the Chinese government as counsellor of the Ministry of Railways, legal adviser to the Executive Yuan, member of Overseas Chinese Affairs Commission, adviser to the Treaty Commission of the Ministry of Foreign Affairs and inspector of China consulates in the Philippines, Dutch East Indies, Malaya and South Africa from 1935. He was also the senior commissioner for China in the Sino-British Joint Boundary Commission for the Investigation of the Southern Section of the Undelimited Yunnan-Burma Boundary from 1935 until 1937. He became counsellor to ambassador Chen Kung Po, the Chinese emissary to Rome in 1938. He then left the central government to join the Yunnan provincial government as development commissioner of the Second Frontier District of Yunnan.

== War-time era ==
=== Resistance activities in Malaya ===
Through the Japanese Malayan campaign during World War II, Leong was the leader of the Malayan Kuomintang-guerrilla branch of the Overseas Chinese Anti-Japanese Army (OCAJA) in Perak, where the group controlled the upper portion of the Perak River Valley. After the war ended and subsequent Japanese surrender, a negotiation was held between him and the British Malayan authorities where he agreed to the OCAJA under his authority being absorbed into the national Special Constabulary in 1947 to fight alongside the British against the Communist-influenced Malayan National Liberation Army (MNLA).

== Later and final years ==
=== Political career in Malaya ===
On 27 February 1949, Tan Cheng Lock founded the Malayan Chinese Association (MCA) along with Leong and Colonel H. S. Lee. Leong became the first Secretary-General of MCA.

He was appointed the Yang di-Pertua Negeri of Malacca on 31 August 1957, and served until 30 August 1959. In 1958, he was awarded a federal title of Tun, bestowed by DYMM Seri Paduka Baginda Yang di-Pertuan Agong of Malaya. He was then appointed the Justice Minister of Malaya in 1959. He died on 12 January 1963 in Petaling Jaya, Selangor.

He was the first and only Chinese to be appointed the Yang di-Pertua Negeri and a member of the Conference of Rulers in any of the Malayan states.

== Election results ==
Federal Legislative Council
Year	Constituency	Candidate	Votes	Pct	Opponent(s)	Votes	Pct	Ballots cast	Majority	Turnout
1955	Ipoh-Menglembu	Leong Yew Koh (MCA)	7,421	76.92%	Loh Ah Kee (NAP)	983	10.19%	9,651	6,438	82.70%
1955	Ipoh-Menglembu	Leong Yew Koh (MCA)	7,421	76.92%	D. R. Seenivasagam (PPP)	808	8.37%	9,651	6,438	82.70%
1955	Ipoh-Menglembu	Leong Yew Koh (MCA)	7,421	76.92%	W. E. Balasingam (IND)	439	4.55%	9,651	6,438	82.70%

== Honour ==
=== Honour of Malaya ===
- Malaya
  - Grand Commander of the Order of the Defender of the Realm (SMN) – Tun (1958)

New creation	Yang di-Pertua Negeri of Malacca; 1957–1959	Succeeded by Abdul Malek Yusuf
