= Idris Haron =

Malaysian politician

Yang Berbahagia Datuk Seri Utama Idris Haron DUNM SSAP DGSM DCSM DMSM DSM
- إدريس هارون
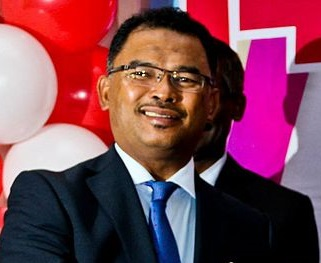

10th Chief Minister of Malacca
- In office 7 May 2013 – 10 May 2018
- Governor: Mohd Khalil Yaakob
- Preceded by: Mohd Ali Rustam
- Succeeded by: Adly Zahari
- Constituency: Sungai Udang

Leader of the Opposition of Malacca
- In office 10 May 2018 – 24 April 2020
- Governor: Mohd Khalil Yaakob (2018-2020)
- Chief Minister: Adly Zahari
- Preceded by: Khoo Poay Tiong
- Succeeded by: Adly Zahari
- Constituency: Sungai Udang

Ministerial roles
- 2008–2009: Deputy Minister of Higher Education

Exco roles (Melaka)
- 2020–2021: Chairman of the Regional, Rural Development and Flood Management Committee

Other roles
- 2010–: President of World Assembly of Youth

Personal details
- Born: Idris bin Haron; 13 May 1966 (age 60) Asahan, Malacca, Malaysia
- Citizenship: Malaysian
- Party: United Malays National Organisation (UMNO) (1993–2021); Independent (2021); People's Justice Party (PKR) (since 2021)
- Other political affiliations: Barisan Nasional (BN) (1993–2021); Perikatan Nasional (PN) (2020–2021); Muafakat Nasional (MN) (2019–2021); Pakatan Harapan (PH) (since 2021)
- Spouse: Fadilah Abdullah
- Children: 4
- Education: University of Texas at El Paso
- Occupation: Politician
- Website: idrisharon.blogspot.com

Idris bin Haron (born 13 May 1966) is a Malaysian politician who served as the 10th Chief Minister of Melaka from May 2013 to May 2018, Member of the Melaka State Executive Council (EXCO) from March 2020 to his resignation in October 2021, Member of the Melaka State Legislative Assembly (MLA) for Sungai Udang from May 2013 to November 2021, Deputy Minister of Higher Education from March 2008 to April 2009 and Member of Parliament (MP) for Tangga Batu from March 2004 to May 2013. Internationally, he is President of the World Assembly of Youth. He is a member of the People's Justice Party (PKR), a component party of the Pakatan Harapan (PH) coalition. He was also member of the United Malays National Organisation (UMNO), a component party of Barisan Nasional (BN) coalition.

== Background ==
Idris is married with four children. For his primary education, he went to four different schools: Sekolah Rendah Kebangsaan (SRK) Simpang Bekoh, SRK Belading, SRK Asahan from 1973 to 1977 and SRK Kubu from 1977 till 1978. He received his secondary education at Sekolah Menengah Sains Muzaffar Syah (MOZAC), Melaka from 1979 till 1983. At MOZAC, he became the school's best student. He later pursued his tertiary education at University of Texas at El Paso and received a Bachelor of Science in Electrical Engineering .

He was the Chairman of the Malaysian Student Conference until he graduated in 1989. In 1993 he participated in an intensive Japanese language training at ITM before pursuing further studies in a technical field at the Kensyu Centre in Tokyo, Japan. He has trained by the Kandenko Corporation Ltd for six months in Tokyo, Japan, in the field of electrical distribution systems. Before his election to Parliament, Idris was a Chairman & President of the Alor Gajah Municipal Council.

== Political career ==
Idris was elected to federal parliament in the 2004 election for the newly created seat of Tangga Batu. In his first year in Parliament, Idris made international news for complaining that the outfits worn by stewardesses on Malaysia Airlines would result in male passengers sexually harassing the stewardesses. After the 2008 election, Idris was appointed a Deputy Minister for Higher Education in the government of Abdullah Ahmad Badawi.

In the 2013 election, Idris vacated his federal parliamentary seat to contest the seat of Sungai Udang in the Malacca State Legislative Assembly. The move was far from a demotion: it was carried out by the Barisan Nasional coalition to install him as the Chief Minister of Malacca, replacing Mohd Ali Rustam. The coalition retained its majority in the state assembly and Idris was sworn in as Malacca's tenth Chief Minister.

=== Chief Minister of Malacca ===
He continued the legacy of his predecessor, Mohd Ali Rustam, but with opposing style by establishing "Melaka Maju-Fasa Dua" (Progressive Melaka-Phase Two). He set up four principles under this umbrella.

1. First, to raise Melaka's quality of products and services to the highest possible level, exceeding the expectations of customers who comprise investors, tourists and the people in the state.
2. Second, system and mechanism of products and services in Melaka must be sustainable.
3. Third, establishing conducive environment for investors and
4. fourth, to maintain the motivation of Melaka's workforce to produce top-notch quality. He also works under the word "Berkat, Tepat, Cepat" (Blessed, Fast, Accurate).

Under his leadership, Melaka obtained its biggest investment ever in her history of RM 4.38 billion in 2014. The waterfront of Melaka, stretching as far as 73 kilometers, were also upgraded for future beach port. He launched "Don't Mess With Melaka", modeled after a 1986 "Don't Mess With Texas" campaign in a bid against littering, crime and social ills. The goal of the campaign was to ensure the state remained one of the cleanest in the country. The statewide campaign used T-shirt and billboard advertising. The campaign's slogan drew criticism on the basis that it could seem to promote gangsterism. Idris defended the slogan, saying that it was a way to grasp the attention of youths through creative and aggressive marketing.

In 2016, Malacca become the safest place to live in Malaysia. The state crime rates dropped by 15.5 per cent in 2017 with 3,096 cases recorded compared to 3,663 in 2016. The State Socioeconomic Report 2017 published on 26 July 2018 reported that Malacca was the state that recorded the lowest unemployment rate in 2017 with only 1.0 percent.

=== Redevelopment of the Big Island ===
He headed the Big Island (Pulau Besar) redevelopment project starting with electricity supply to Big Island involving 12 towers from 4.7 kilometers of Siring Beach which will supply electricity at a capacity of five megawatts to a maximum capacity of 132 megawatts. The project, which began on 5 November 2012 and completed in February 2015, is aimed at making 129.64 hectares of the Big Island and houses resorts and historic areas, as one of the major tourism products in Melaka. The upgrading of Sekolah Menengah Agama Dan Tahfiz Al-Quran Pulau Besar Melaka is also ongoing to provide students with greater comfort to memorize the Koran. He has planned to develop Pulau Besar as a tourist island in the state. In March 2016, preliminary allocations were given to repair the mosque and food court on the island, besides the construction of a Maahad Tahfiz. Focus is on basic development before being followed by other facilities, including an international standard food court. When all the repair and construction work on the island is completed, it will be able to become an international resort island capable of attracting many visitors. The development process in the island is run in stages. The island's maintenance and development project will be able to attract a large number of tourists. At the same time, it will be one of the major contributors to the Melaka economy.

=== Taking Serious Look At Khurafat Activity ===
A complete jetty and mosque with police cottages and CCTV surveillance are designed to be built on the Big Island to avoid the bad deeds of the visitors, thereby preventing the activities of superstition. He has decided to direct the State Mufti Department, the Melaka Islamic Religious Department to hold a deep discussion to resolve the issue of superstition in the Big Island. In February 2018, he had received a full report on his activities on the Big Island and requested that a discussion involve a large desk be made to find the most appropriate approach to address the problem. He had interviewed the organizers of the program on the Big Island, most of them defending that they were doing the right way because each brought in insight from some of the corners of the world. He has told them that the practice is against the Islamic creed and it has to be eradicated.

=== Melaka Development ===
Total gross domestic product (GDP) revenue of RM27.9 billion and per capita income of RM35,699 recorded in 2013 increased to RM33.2 billion and per capita income of RM41,363 in 2017. During 2013 to 2017, Melaka successfully brought investments from outside amounted to RM17.1 billion and this excludes agreed investment, bringing the total to more than RM22 billion. The elevated viaduct was constructed at the intersection of MITC International Trade Center and Peringgit and is expected to be completed in June 2018 to reduce traffic congestion.

=== Melaka Sports Development Icon ===
Idris has been named the recipient of the Melaka Sports Development Icon Award in March 2018 in recognition of his services helping to develop state sports especially football. Malacca football has made a resurgence within a short period of time and continues to be in the Super League. Excellence in sports is able to enhance the image and attention of the Melaka state in the eyes of the world, especially with the achievements of boasting Melaka athletes and teams.

=== Defection, resignation as EXCO member and subsequent defeat in reelection as MLA ===
On 4 October 2021, he and three other MLAs, Pantai Kundor MLA Nor Azman Hassan of UMNO, Telok Mas MLA Noor Effandi Ahmad of Malaysian United Indigenous Party (BERSATU) and independent Pengkalan Batu MLA Norhizam Hassan Baktee declared their loss of confidence and withdrawal of support for Chief Minister Sulaiman Md Ali as well as claiming that the state government had fallen. On the same day, his UMNO membership was also nullified, after he triggered the collapse of the state government led by his party UMNO. He, Noor Effandi and Norhizam also resigned as EXCO members at the same day. He started aligning himself and three other MLAs with the Pakatan Harapan (PH) opposition coalition to form a new state government. However, the assembly was instead dissolved and an election was called. However, he carried on aligning with PH and allowed PH to decide on the future of their political careers. On 6 November 2021, he officially joined the People's Justice Party (PKR), a component party of the PH coalition and was fielded to contest the Asahan state seat with the PH ticket but lost.

== Election results ==
Parliament of Malaysia
Year	Constituency	Candidate	Votes	Pct	Opponent(s)	Votes	Pct	Ballots cast	Majority	Turnout
2004	P136 Tangga Batu	Idris Haron (UMNO)	26,766	79.36%	Shamsul Iskandar Mohd Akin (PKR)	7,522	20.64%	42,965	24,444	80.62%
2008	P136 Tangga Batu	Idris Haron (UMNO)	30,460	65.62%	Zainon Jaafar (PKR)	15,960	34.38%	49,675	14,500	82.53%

Malacca State Legislative Assembly
Year	Constituency	Candidate	Votes	Pct	Opponent(s)	Votes	Pct	Ballots cast	Majority	Turnout
2013	N11 Sungai Udang	Idris Haron (UMNO)	12,145	79.15%	Asri Buang (PKR)	3,009	19.61%	15,345	9,136	87.00%
2018	N11 Sungai Udang	Idris Haron (UMNO)	10,073	56.22%	Mohd Lokman Abdul Gani (PKR)	7,844	43.78%	17,917	2,229	80.30%
2021	N10 Asahan	Idris Haron (PKR)	2,666	30.99%	Fairul Nizam Roslan (UMNO)	5,659	65.77%	8,604	2,993	65.18%
2021	N10 Asahan	Idris Haron (PKR)	2,666	30.99%	Dhanesh Basil (Gerakan)	1,364	15.83%	8,604	2,993	65.18%
2021	N10 Asahan	Idris Haron (PKR)	2,666	30.99%	Mohd Noor Saleh (IND)	136	1.58%	8,604	2,993	65.18%
2021	N10 Asahan	Idris Haron (PKR)	2,666	30.99%	Azmar Ab Hamid (IND)	99	1.15%	8,604	2,993	65.18%
2021	N10 Asahan	Idris Haron (PKR)	2,666	30.99%	Mohd Akhir Ayob (IND)	44	0.51%	8,604	2,993	65.18%

== Honours ==
=== Honours of Malaysia ===
- Malacca
  - Grand Principal of the Premier and Exalted Order of Malacca (DUNM) – Datuk Seri Utama (2016)
  - Grand Commander of the Exalted Order of Malacca (DGSM) – Datuk Seri (2013)
  - Commander of the Exalted Order of Malacca (DCSM) – Datuk Wira (2011)
  - Companion of the Exalted Order of Malacca (DMSM) – Datuk (2005)
  - Member of the Exalted Order of Malacca (DSM) (2002)
- Pahang
  - Grand Companion of the Order of Sultan Ahmad Shah of Pahang (SSAP) – Dato' Sri (2015)

Political offices
Preceded by Mohd Ali Rustam	Chief Minister of Melaka; 2013-2018	Succeeded by Adly Zahari
Parliament of Malaysia
Preceded by Constituency established	Member of the Dewan Rakyat for Tangga Batu; 2004-2013	Succeeded by Abu Bakar Mohamad Diah
Diplomatic posts
Preceded by Mohd Ali Rustam	President of the World Assembly of Youth; 2010-present	Incumbent
