= Abdul Aziz Abdul Majid =

Malaysian politician and statesman

Yang Amat Berbahagia Tun Abdul Aziz Abdul Majid SMN PMN DPMK CBE
- عبدالعزيز عبدالمجيد
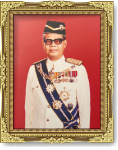

3rd Yang di-Pertua Negeri of Malacca
- In office 31 August 1971 – 9 May 1975
- Preceded by: Abdul Malek Yusuf
- Succeeded by: Syed Zahiruddin Syed Hassan

5th Menteri Besar of Selangor
- In office 1 September 1955 – 1956
- Preceded by: Raja Uda
- Succeeded by: Ismail Abdul Latif

3rd Menteri Besar of Negeri Sembilan
- In office 1 October 1952 – 1 October 1953
- Preceded by: Abdul Malek Yusuf
- Succeeded by: Abdul Malek Yusuf

1st Chief Secretary to the Government of Malaysia
- In office 1 August 1957 – 31 August 1965
- Monarchs: Abdul Rahman; Hisamuddin; Putra
- Prime Minister: Tunku Abdul Rahman
- Preceded by: Inaugural officeholder; new creation
- Succeeded by: Abdul Jamil Abdul Rais

Personal details
- Born: Abdul Aziz bin Abdul Majid; 12 March 1907 Kajang, Hulu Langat, Selangor, Federated Malay States
- Died: 10 May 1975 (aged 68) Malacca Town, Central Malacca, Malacca, Malaysia
- Spouse(s): Kamariah Sulaiman; Raja Teh Zaitunnisa Raja Kamaralzaman; Mariam Abdul Ghani (divorced)
- Relations: Abdul Aziz Yassin (son-in-law)
- Children: 4

Abdul Aziz bin Abdul Majid (12 March 1907 – 10 May 1975) was the Yang di-Pertua Negeri of Malacca from 1971 to 1975. He also served as Menteri Besar in two states from 1952 to 1956.

== Early life ==
He was educated at the Kajang High School in Kajang, Selangor.

In March 1948, he pursued his higher education by taking a course known as the 'Second Devonshire Training Course' at Oxford University, United Kingdom and later took a PhD in Law at the same university.

== Career ==
He started his career as a teacher before being appointed as a Collector of Land Revenue, Assistant District Officer and then a full District Officer. Later, he served as Assistant Secretary at the Selangor Local Commissioner's office. On 1 February 1948, he was again appointed as the First Secretary to the Selangor State Secretary.

After studying in United Kingdom, he was appointed District Officer of Teluk Anson (now Teluk Intan). He was later appointed as a Member of the State Assembly of Negeri Sembilan and Assistant Secretary of Internal Security in the Defense Division.

In 1952, he was appointed by Tuanku Abdul Rahman as the Menteri Besar of Negeri Sembilan. Then on 1 September 1955, he was appointed as Menteri Besar of Selangor.

In 1956, he was appointed to represent the Malay rulers in the Merdeka delegation to United Kingdom to discuss matters of defense for Malaysia. Later, upon independence in 1957 (four weeks or 30 days before the 31st of the month on August 1 of that year), he was appointed the first Chief Secretary to the Government of Malaysia and served until 1965, when he took optional compulsory retirement at the age of 58 years.

After his retirement from politics as well as from the civil service, he was appointed as Yang di-Pertua Negeri of Melaka and lived in the official residence, Sri Melaka (now used as a museum) until his death.

== Honours ==
=== Honours of Malaysia ===
- Malaya
  - Commander of the Order of the Defender of the Realm (PMN) – Tan Sri (1959)
- Malaysia
  - Grand Commander of the Order of the Defender of the Realm (SMN) – Tun (1973)
- Kelantan
  - Knight Commander of the Order of the Crown of Kelantan (DPMK) – Dato' (1961)

=== Foreign Honours ===
- United Kingdom
  - Honorary Commander of the Order of the British Empire (CBE) (1957)

=== Places named after him ===
Several places were named after him, including:

- Jalan Tun Abdul Aziz in Kajang, Selangor
- Tun Abdul Aziz Mosque in Petaling Jaya, Selangor
- Sekolah Kebangsaan Tun Abdul Aziz Majid in Hulu Langat, Selangor

Preceded by Abdul Malek Yusuf	Yang di-Pertua Negeri of Malacca; 1971–1976	Succeeded by Syed Zahiruddin Syed Hassan
