= Abu Zahar Ithnin =

Malaysian politician

Yang Berbahagia Datuk Seri Abu Zahar Ithnin DGSM DMSM AMN

Parliamentary Secretary of the Ministry of Home Affairs
- In office December 1999 – March 2004
- Succeeded by: Abu Seman Yusop as Parliamentary Secretary of the Ministry of Internal Security

8th Chief Minister of Malacca
- In office 23 May 1997 – 2 December 1999
- Preceded by: Mohd Zin Abdul Ghani
- Succeeded by: Mohd Ali Rustam

Member of the Malaysian Parliament for Jasin
- In office 20 December 1999 – 4 March 2004
- Preceded by: Abdul Ghafar Baba
- Succeeded by: Mohammad Said Yusof

Member of the Malacca State Legislative Assembly for Merlimau
- In office 1995–1999
- Preceded by: new constituency
- Succeeded by: Nazari Adzim

Speaker of the Malacca State Legislative Assembly
- In office 4 August 1986 – 19 October 1994
- Preceded by: Abdul Razak Alias
- Succeeded by: Jaafar Lajis

Member of the Malacca State Legislative Assembly for Sungai Rambai
- In office 1986–1995
- Preceded by: Ahmad Ithnin
- Succeeded by: Abdul Azis Abdul Ghani

Personal details
- Born: 14 September 1937 Kampung Merlimau Pasir, Merlimau, Melaka
- Died: 12 July 2013 (aged 75) Kampung Merlimau Pasir, Merlimau, Melaka
- Party: United Malays National Organisation (UMNO)
- Other political affiliations: Barisan Nasional (BN)
- Spouse: Khalijah binti Haji Mohd Jiddi
- Children: Zalina; Roslaini; Marina; Zuraini; Khaidiriah; Mohd Aidi Iskandar
- Education: Sekolah Tinggi Melaka, Institut Pendidikan Guru Kampus Kota Bharu
- Occupation: Politician

Abu Zahar bin Ithnin (14 September 1937–12 July 2013) was a Malaysian politician and the Chief Minister of Malacca from May 1997 to December 1999. He had also been Malacca State Legislative Assembly Speaker. His daughter, Dira Abu Zahar is also a politician and former actress.

== Death ==
Ithnin died of complications of a kidney disease on 12 July 2013 at the age of 74. He was buried at the Malacca Heroes Mausoleum near Al Azim Mosque, Malacca Town.

== Election results ==
Malacca State Legislative Assembly
Year	Constituency	Candidate	Votes	Pct	Opponent(s)	Votes	Pct	Ballots cast	Majority	Turnout
1986	N20 Sungai Rambai	Abu Zahar Ithnin (UMNO)	4,168	70.68%	Rahimin Bani (PAS)	1,729	29.32%	6,204	2,439	70.73%
1990	N20 Sungai Rambai	Abu Zahar Ithnin (UMNO)	5,022	70.95%	Abu Samah Ahmad (S46)	2,056	29.05%	7,376	2,966	79.13%
1995	N23 Merlimau	Abu Zahar Ithnin (UMNO)								

Parliament of Malaysia
Year	Constituency	Candidate	Votes	Pct	Opponent(s)	Votes	Pct	Ballots cast	Majority	Turnout
1999	P124 Jasin	Abu Zahar Ithnin (UMNO)	23,638	64.61%	Mujahid Yusof Rawa (PAS)	12,947	35.39%	37,467	10,691	77.78%

== Honours ==
- Malaysia
  - Member of the Order of the Defender of the Realm (AMN) (1980)
- Malacca
  - Companion of the Exalted Order of Malacca (DMSM) – Datuk (1987)
  - Grand Commander of the Exalted Order of Malacca (DGSM) – Datuk Seri (1995)
