= Mohd Khalil Yaakob =

Former governor of Malacca, Malaysia

Yang Amat Berbahagia Tun Datuk Seri Utama Mohd Khalil Yaakob SMN DUNM SSAP SJMK SUMZ SPDK PSM SIMP DP DSAP JSM SMP
- محمد خليل يعقوب
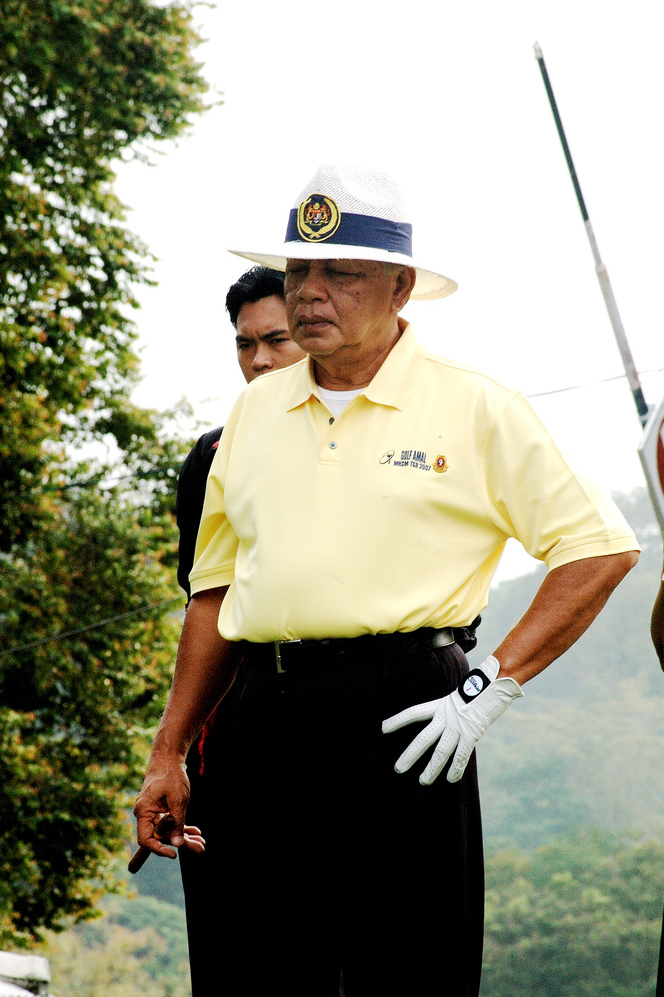

6th Yang di-Pertua Negeri of Malacca
- In office 4 June 2004 – 4 June 2020
- Chief Minister: See list: Mohd Ali Rustam Idris Haron Adly Zahari Sulaiman Md Ali
- Preceded by: Syed Ahmad Shahabuddin
- Succeeded by: Mohd Ali Rustam

Minister of Information
- In office 15 December 1999 – 26 March 2004
- Monarchs: Salahuddin; Sirajuddin
- Prime Minister: Mahathir Mohamad; Abdullah Ahmad Badawi
- Deputy: Mohd. Khalid Mohd. Yunos (1999-2002); Zainuddin Maidin (2002-2004); Donald Lim Siang Chai (2003-2004)
- Preceded by: Mohamed Rahmat
- Succeeded by: Abdul Kadir Sheikh Fadzir
- Constituency: Kuantan

13th Menteri Besar of Pahang
- In office 14 August 1986 – 22 May 1999
- Monarch: Ahmad Shah
- Preceded by: Najib Razak
- Succeeded by: Adnan Yaakob

Member of the Malaysian Parliament for Kuantan
- In office 29 November 1999 – 21 March 2004
- Preceded by: Fauzi Abdul Rahman
- Succeeded by: Fu Ah Kiow
- Majority: 7,343 (1999)

Personal details
- Born: Mohd Khalil bin Yaakob; 29 December 1937 (age 88) Kuantan, Pahang, Federated Malay States, British Malaya (now Malaysia)
- Citizenship: Malaysian
- Party: United Malays National Organisation (UMNO)
- Other political affiliations: Barisan Nasional (BN); Muafakat Nasional (MN)
- Spouse: Zurina Kassim (m. 1965; died 2022)
- Education: University of Malaya, Kolej Universiti Islam Melaka
- Profession: Diplomat

Mohd Khalil bin Yaakob (Jawi: محمد خليل بن يعقوب; born 29 December 1937) is a Malaysian politician who served as the 6th Yang di-Pertua Negeri of Malacca from June 2004 to June 2020, 12th Menteri Besar of Pahang from August 1986 to May 1999, Minister of Information in the Barisan Nasional (BN) administration under former Prime Minister Mahathir Mohamad from December 1999 to March 2004 and Member of Parliament (MP) for Kuantan from November 1999 to March 2004. He is a member of the United Malays National Organisation (UMNO), a component party of the ruling BN coalition.

== Early life ==
Born in Kuantan, Khalil attended Malay College Kuala Kangsar and later graduated with a Bachelor of Arts from the University of Malaya. He was a career diplomat and served in Italy, Morocco, Singapore and Indonesia.

== Political career ==
Khalil is a member of UMNO and served on its supreme council from 1984. He became party secretary-general in 1999 until his appointment as governor.

His was first elected to the Bukit Ibam state seat in the Pahang State Assembly during the 1978 general elections. In 1982, he won the Maran parliamentary seat and was appointed Deputy Minister of Education. He joined the Cabinet in 1984, serving as Minister in the Prime Minister's Department.

Khalil won the Bukit Tajau state seat in the 1986 general elections, and became Menteri Besar of Pahang. He served for three terms, until 1999. In the 1999 general elections, he rejoined federal politics and was elected as Member of Parliament for Kuantan. He was appointed Minister of Information but did not contest the next election, held in 2004.

In April 2001, a police report was lodged by Pahang state assemblyman Fauzi Abdul Rahman alleging that Mohd Khalil misappropriated state resources as Pahang Menteri Besar.

== Governor ==
On 4 June 2004, Khalil was appointed Yang di-Pertua Negeri of Malacca by Yang di-Pertuan Agong Tuanku Syed Sirajuddin.

During his term as the Yang di-Pertua Negeri (Governor), Khalil's main goal was to make Malacca a progress state in the year 2010 and then "Green Technology City State" in the year 2013. He was also made Malacca City as the UNESCO's World Heritage Site on 7 July 2008.

Among state major projects under his tenure include, Pulau Melaka, Malacca Straits Mosque, Hang Tuah Mall in Jalan Hang Tuah, Dataran Pahlawan Megamall, Menara Taming Sari, Hang Tuah Village in Duyong, Hang Tuah Jaya, Melaka Planetarium, Melaka Sentral, Melaka Monorail, UTC Melaka, upgrading the airport in Batu Berendam into international airport, Melaka Gateway and Malacca coastal reclamation land project.

== Interests ==
Mohd Khalil is fan of Indian actor M. G. Ramachandran and Tamil cinema in general. In August 2011, he re-enacted MGR's role in the film Vettaikaaran in a 45-minute performance at the State Culture and Art Auditorium.

== Legacy ==
The Tun Mohd Khalil Yaakob Mosque at Tanjung Minyak is named after him.

== Election results ==
Pahang State Legislative Assembly
Year	Constituency	Candidate	Votes	Pct	Opponent(s)	Votes	Pct	Ballots cast	Majority	Turnout
1978	N27 Bukit Ibam	Mohd Khalil Yaakob (UMNO)	Unknown							
1986	N19 Bukit Tajau	Mohd Khalil Yaakob (UMNO)	5,742	76.45%	Abd Manaf Othman (PAS)	1,769	23.55%	7,691	3,973	78.16%
1990	N19 Bukit Tajau	Mohd Khalil Yaakob (UMNO)	6,360	70.73%	Salleh Abdullah (S46)	2,632	29.27%	9,296	3,728	80.29%
1995	N19 Lepar	Mohd Khalil Yaakob (UMNO)	Unknown							

Parliament of Malaysia
Year	Constituency	Candidate	Votes	Pct	Opponent(s)	Votes	Pct	Ballots cast	Majority	Turnout
1982	P069 Maran	Mohd Khalil Yaakob (UMNO)	22,495	67.42%	Alwi Abdul Hamid (PAS)	10,868	32.58%	34,534	11,627	76.67%
1999	P083 Kuantan	Mohd Khalil Yaakob (UMNO)	28,479	57.40%	Fuziah Salleh (keADILan)	21,136	42.60%	52,308	7,343	74.26%

== Honours ==
He has been awarded:

=== Honours of Malaysia ===
- Malaysia
  - Companion of the Order of Loyalty to the Crown of Malaysia (JSM) (1979)
  - Commander of the Order of Loyalty to the Crown of Malaysia (PSM) – Tan Sri (1989)
  - Grand Commander of the Order of the Defender of the Realm (SMN) – Tun (2004)
- Kelantan
  - Knight Grand Commander of the Order of the Life of the Crown of Kelantan (SJMK) – Dato' (2004)
- Malacca
  - Grand Master (4 June 2004 – 3 June 2020) and Knight Grand Commander of the Premier and Exalted Order of Malacca (DUNM) – Datuk Seri Utama (2004)
- Pahang
  - Companion of the Order of the Crown of Pahang (SMP)
  - Knight Companion of the Order of Sultan Ahmad Shah of Pahang (DSAP) – Dato'
  - Grand Knight of the Order of the Crown of Pahang (SIMP) – formerly Dato', now Dato' Indera (1985)
  - Grand Knight of the Order of Sultan Ahmad Shah of Pahang (SSAP) – Dato' Sri (1987)
- Terengganu
  - Supreme Class Member of the Order of Sultan Mizan Zainal Abidin of Terengganu (SUMZ) – Dato' Seri Utama (2006)
- Sabah
  - Grand Commander of the Order of Kinabalu (SPDK) – Datuk Seri Panglima (2003)
- Sarawak
  - Knight Grand Commander of the Order of the Star of Hornbill Sarawak (DP) – Datuk Patinggi

=== Foreign honours ===
- Germany
  - Knight Grand Cross of the Order of Merit of the Federal Republic of Germany

=== Honorary doctorate ===
He was also awarded the Honorary Doctorate (PhD) in Leadership from Limkokwing University of Creative Technology (LUCT) on 29 September 2016.

Preceded by Syed Ahmad Syed Mahmud Shahabuddin	Yang di-Pertua Negeri of Malacca; 2004 – 2020	Succeeded by Mohd Ali Rustam
