= Syed Zahiruddin =

Malaysian politician

Yang Amat Berbahagia Orang Kaya Bendahara Seri Maharaja Tun Dato' Seri Diraja Syed Zahiruddin Syed Hassan SMN SPSA DUNM PSM DSA SPCM SPMP DPMP JMN PJK

4th Yang di-Pertua Negeri of Malacca
- In office 23 May 1976 – 30 November 1984
- Preceded by: Abdul Aziz Abdul Majid
- Succeeded by: Syed Ahmad Syed Mahmud Shahabuddin

Personal details
- Born: Syed Zahiruddin bin Syed Hassan; 11 October 1918 Pondok Tanjung, Kerian, Perak, Federated Malay States, British Malaya (now Malaysia)
- Died: 20 April 2013 (aged 94) Petaling Jaya, Selangor, Malaysia
- Resting place: Bukit Kiara Muslim Cemetery, Kuala Lumpur
- Spouse: Toh Puan Halimah Md. Noh
- Children: 10
- Parents: Syed Hassan Syed Ibrahim (father); Raja Halimah Raja Abdullah (mother)

Tun Syed Dato' Seri Diraja Zahiruddin bin Syed Hassan (11 October 1918 – 20 April 2013) was the Yang di-Pertua Negeri of Malacca from 1976 to 1984. Before his appointment he was a retired senior government administrative & diplomatic (PTD) officer. The position he held prior to retirement from PTD was Malaysia's Ambassador and High Commissioner to both Ireland in 1975 and the United Kingdom in 1974. He was also the holder of the State of Perak's Royal Chieftain position of Orang Kaya Dato' Bendahara Sri Maharaja, Orang Besar Empat Negeri Perak Darul Ridzuan. SMK Tun Syed Zahiruddin was also named after him.

== Death ==
Zahiruddin died on 20 April 2013 of a kidney failure, aged 95 and was buried at Bukit Kiara Muslim Cemetery in Kuala Lumpur.

== Awards and recognitions ==
=== Honours of Malaysia ===
- Malaysia
  - Grand Commander of the Order of the Defender of the Realm (SMN) – Tun (1976)
  - Commander of the Order of Loyalty to the Crown of Malaysia (PSM) – Tan Sri (1968)
  - Companion of the Order of the Defender of the Realm (JMN) (1965)
  - Malaysian Commemorative Medal (Silver) (PPM) (1965)
- Perak
  - Ordinary Class of the Perak Family Order of Sultan Azlan Shah (SPSA) – Dato' Seri Diraja (2005)
  - Grand Knight of the Azlanii Royal Family Order (DSA) – Dato' Seri (2009)
  - Knight Grand Commander of the Order of Cura Si Manja Kini (SPCM) – Dato' Seri (1987)
  - Knight Grand Commander of the Order of the Perak State Crown (SPMP) – Dato' Seri (1971)
  - Knight Commander of the Order of the Perak State Crown (DPMP) – Dato' (1964)

=== Places named after him ===
Several places were named after him, including:

- Tun Syed Zahiruddin Residential College, a residential college at University of Malaya, Kuala Lumpur
- SMK Tun Syed Zahiruddin, a secondary school in Merlimau, Malacca

Preceded by Abdul Aziz Abdul Majid	Yang di-Pertua Negeri of Malacca; 1976–1984	Succeeded by Syed Ahmad Syed Mahmud Shahabuddin
