= Order of the Defender of the Realm =

Malaysian federal award

Order of the Defender of the Realm Darjah Yang Mulia Pangkuan Negara
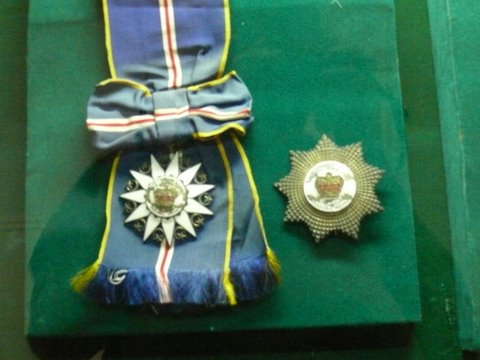
- Ribbon and Star of (highest) S.M.N rank

Awarded by the King of Malaysia
- Type: State Order
- Established: 9 August 1958
- Ribbon: Blue with a white-edged red central stripe and yellow edges.
- Motto: 'Dipeliharakan Allah - Pangkuan Negara' (By the Grace of God - Defender of the Realm)
- Eligibility: Former Prime Ministers, State Governors (Yang di-Pertua Negeri), Civil servants
- Awarded for: Meritorious service to the country
- Status: Currently constituted
- Sovereign: Sultan Ibrahim, King of Malaysia
- Grades: Grand Commander (SMN); Commander (PMN); Companion (JMN); Officer (KMN); Member (AMN); Medal (PPN)
- Post-nominals: S.M.N. / P.M.N. / J.M.N. / K.M.N. / A.M.N. / P.P.N.

Statistics
- First induction: 1958
- Last induction: 2025
- Total inductees: 45 Grand Commanders; 147 Commanders; 1,417 Companions; 10,909 Officers; 24,324 Members; 34,524 Medallists; 50 Honorary Grand Commanders; 102 Honorary Commanders; 199 Honorary Companions; 181 Honorary Officers; 265 Honorary Members; 207 Honorary Medallists

Precedence
- Next (higher): Order of the Crown of the Realm
- Next (lower): Order of Loyalty to the Crown of Malaysia
- Ribbon of the Order

The Most Esteemed Order of the Defender of the Realm (Malay: Darjah Yang Mulia Pangkuan Negara) is a Malaysian federal award presented for meritorious service to the country. The order's motto is 'Dipeliharakan Allah-Pangkuan Negara' (lit. 'By the Grace of God-Defender of the Realm').

The order was instituted on 6 August 1958 and initially had the five highest ranks. The medal was added on 19 August 1960.

== Order ranks ==
	Grand Commander	Commander	Companion	Officer	Member	Medal
Collar, Star and Medal						P.P.N. Medal front view
Suffixes	S.M.N.	P.M.N.	J.M.N.	K.M.N.	A.M.N.	P.P.N.
Titles	Tun	Tan Sri	None	None	None	None
Ribbons						

The order has six ranks:

=== Grand Commander ===
- Grand Commander of the Order of the Defender of the Realm (S.M.N.) (Malay: Seri Maharaja Mangku Negara).

This rank is limited to 25 living recipients at any time, except foreign citizens who are conferred honorary awards. The recipient of this award receives the title Tun and his wife Toh Puan.

The collar comprises the crests of the states in Malaysia with an eleven-pointed star made of gold-plated silver. The ribbon is of dark blue silk and has yellow stripes on both the edges. It has a central white stripe, charged with a smaller red stripe in its middle.

=== Commander ===
- Commander of the Order of the Defender of the Realm (P.M.N.) (Malay: Panglima Mangku Negara)

It is limited to 75 living recipients at any time, excluding foreign citizens who are conferred honorary awards. The recipient of this award receives the title Tan Sri and the recipient's wife takes the title of Puan Sri.

The Star is made of gold-plated silver and so is the badge but smaller in size. The ribbon has white stripes on both the edges and red stripes in the centre. The red stripes lie on the yellow stripes. The end of the ribbon is tied with a ribbon and the badge suspends from below the ribbon.

=== Companion ===
- Companion of the Order of the Defender of the Realm (J.M.N.) (Malay: Johan Mangku Negara)

Living recipients are limited to 700 only at any time, excluding foreign citizens who receive it as an honorary award. It does not carry any title.

The badge of the Johan Mangku Negara is an eleven-pointed star made of gold-plated silver. Each point is white and in between are a star and crescent moon. They are made of gold-plated silver. In the centre of the star is a white circle decorated with carvings of the Malaysian Royal Crown. The badge has a radius of 2¼ inches. It suspends from a ribbon which is of the same colour as that of the Grand Commander of the Order of the Defender of the Realm but has narrower stripes. The badge is worn around the neck. The badge for women has a ribbon which is tied in a bow. The badge suspends from the bow and is pinned to the chest.

=== Officer ===
- Officer of the Order of the Defender of the Realm (K.M.N.) (Malay: Kesatria Mangku Negara)

There is no limit to the number of persons to be awarded this honour. It can also be conferred on foreign citizens as an honorary award. It does not carry any title.

The badge of the Kesatria Mangku Negara is similar in shape as that of the Johan Mangku Negara. It has a radius of 2 inches. The badge suspends from a riband measuring 1½ inches. The ribbon is of the same colour as that of the Johan Setia Negara. There is a kris on the ribbon, upright with its blade pointing downward. The kris is enclosed in a circle. The badge is pinned on the chest. For the women, the ribbon is tied in a bow and the badge suspends from below the knot of the bow. The kris in the circle is pinned on the bow of the ribbon.

=== Member ===
- Member of the Order of the Defender of the Realm (A.M.N.) (Malay: Ahli Mangku Negara)

There is no limit to the number to be awarded this honour. It can also be conferred on foreign citizens as an honorary award.

The design the badge is the same as that of the Darjah Kesatria Mangku Negara but the kris lies in the centre. The badge has a radius of 1¾ inches. It is pinned to the chest. It suspends from a riband which is of the same colour as that of the Kesatria Mangku Negara. For women, the riband is tied in a bow and the badge suspends from below the centre of the bow.

=== Medal ===
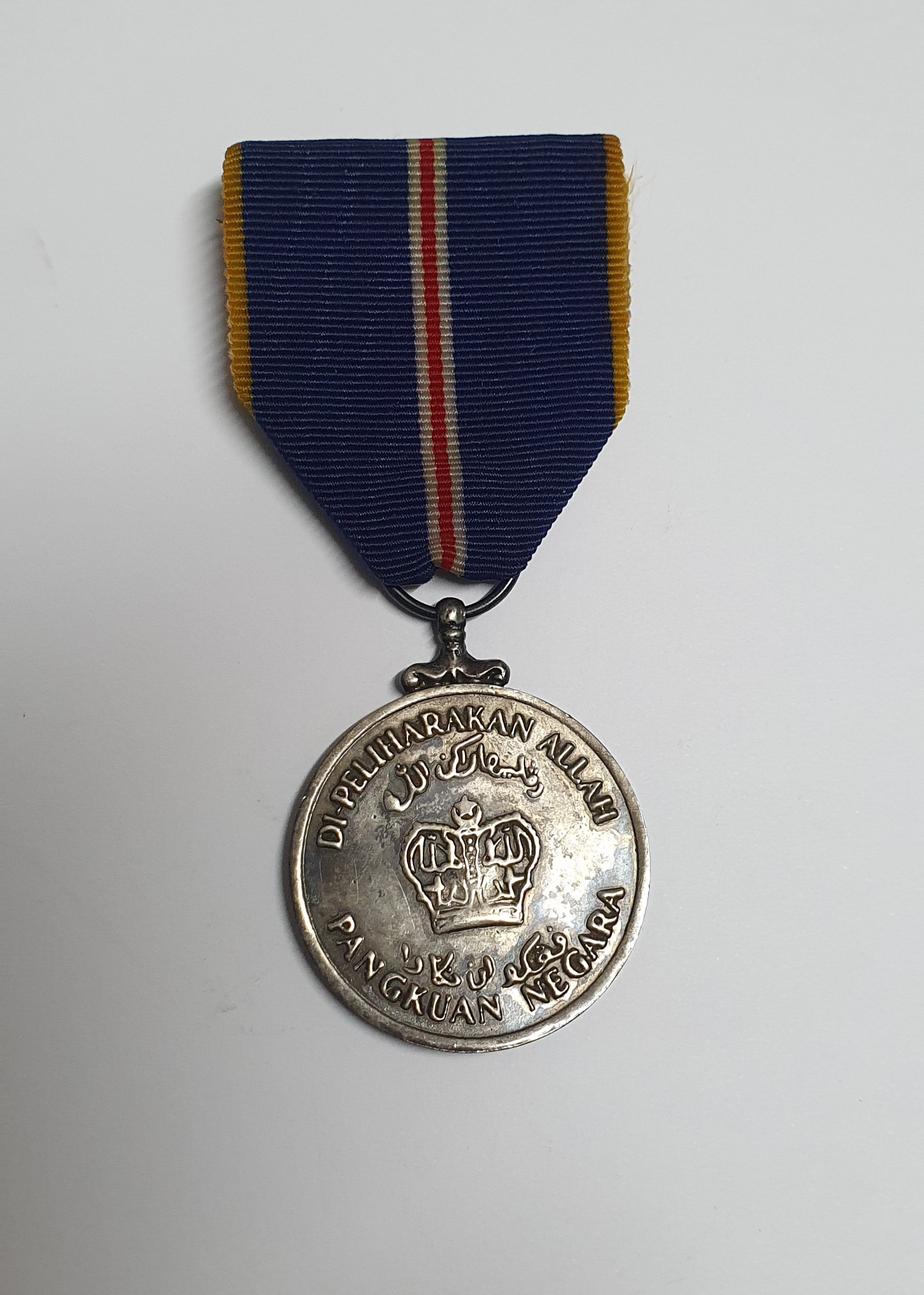
P.P.N. Medal front view

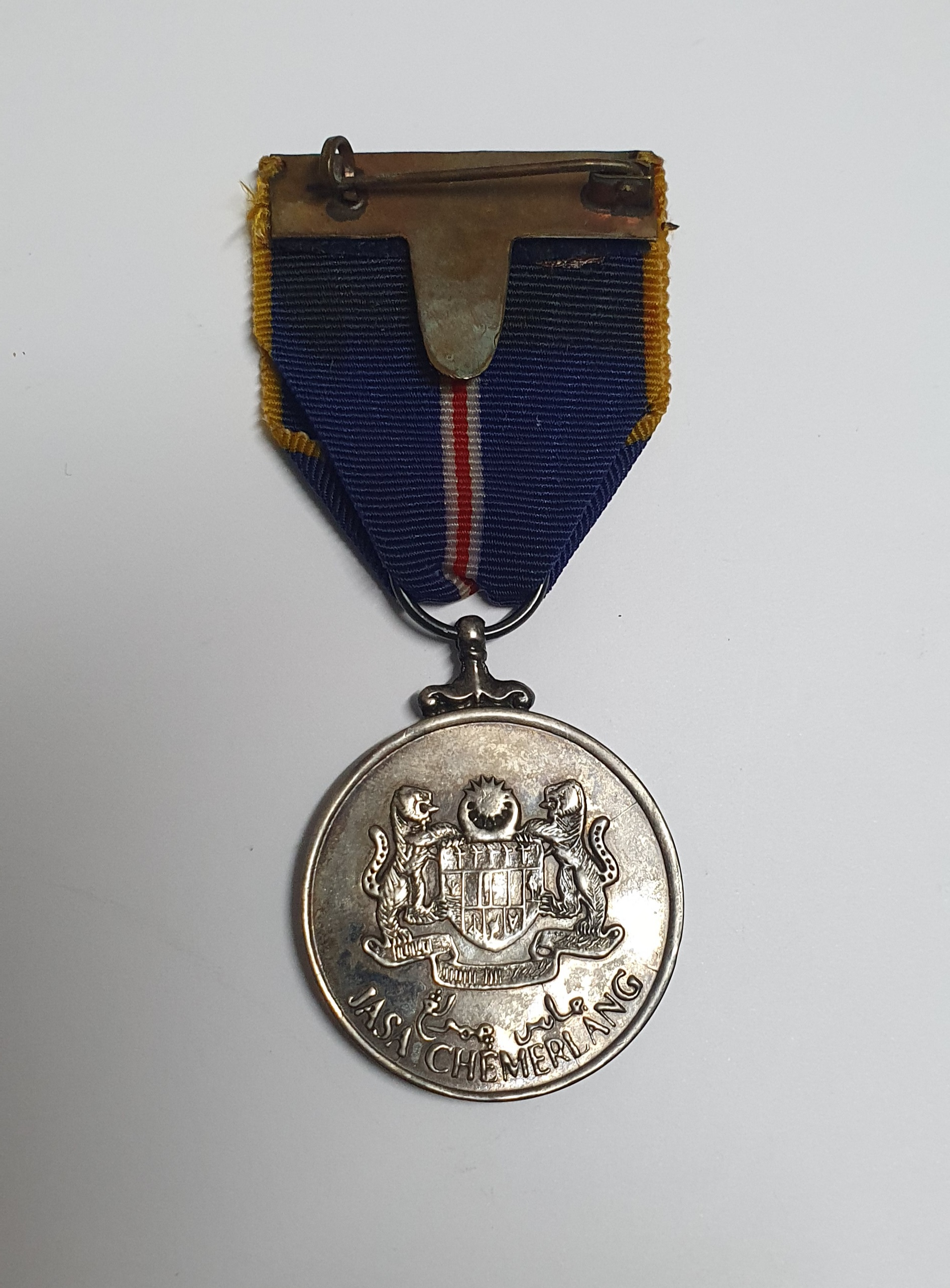
P.P.N. Medal rear view

- Medal of the Order of the Defender of the Realm (P.P.N.) (Malay: Pingat Pangkuan Negara)

There is no limit to the number to be honored with this award. It can also be conferred on foreign citizens as an honorary award. It does not carry any title.

The Pangkuan Negara medal is round and made of silver. On the surface is a carving of the Malaysian Royal Crown. The slogan DIPELIHARAKAN ALLAH is surmounted on the Crown. The alphabets are in Roman and Jawi. Under the Malaysian Royal Crown is another inscription, PANGKUAN NEGARA, also in Roman and Jawi alphabets. At the back of the badge is the Federal Crest with the inscription JASA CEMERLANG in Roman and Jawi. The badge suspends from a ribbon, which is of the same shape and colour as that of the Ahli Mangku Negara and is about 1½ inches wide.

== Recipients ==
Official source

=== Grand Commanders (S.M.N.) ===
The grand commander receives the title Tun and his wife Toh Puan.

- 1958: Tunku Kurshiah
- 1958: Tunku Ismail
- 1958: Tunku Munawir
- 1958: Tengku Yahya Petra
- 1958: Leong Yew Koh
- 1958: Raja Uda
- 1958: Tan Cheng Lock
- 1959: Abdul Razak Hussein
- 1959: Henry Lee Hau Shik
- 1959: Tengku Budriah
- 1961: Abdul Malek Yusuf
- 1963: Yusof Ishak
- 1964: Abang Openg
- 1964: Mustapha Harun
- 1967: Pengiran Ahmad Raffae
- 1968: Syed Sheh Shahabudin
- 1970: Syed Sheh Barakbah
- 1970: Tuanku Bujang
- 1970: Sharifah Rodziah Barakbah
- 1972: Abdul Aziz Abdul Majid
- 1975: Fuad Stephens
- 1976: Sardon Jubir
- 1976: Syed Zahiruddin
- 1977: Mohd Hamdan Abdullah
- 1978: Abang Muhammad Salahuddin
- 1978: Ahmad Koroh
- 1979: Mohamad Adnan Robert
- 1981: Hussein Onn
- 1982: Abdul Rahman Ya'kub
- 1982: Awang Hassan
- 1987: Tunku Ibrahim Ismail
- 1989: Ahmad Zaidi Adruce
- 1989: Hamdan Sheikh Tahir
- 1989: Mohammad Said Keruak
- 1989: Syed Ahmad Shahabuddin
- 1996: Sakaran Dandai
- 2001: Abdul Rahman Abbas
- 2003: Ahmadshah Abdullah
- 2003: Mahathir Mohamad
- 2004: Mohd Khalil Yaakob, 6th Yang di-Pertuan Negeri of Malacca
- 2009: Abdullah Ahmad Badawi
- 2011: Juhar Mahiruddin, 10th Yang di-Pertuan Negeri of Sabah
- 2014: Abdul Taib Mahmud, 7th Yang di-Pertuan Negeri of Sarawak
- 2020: Mohd Ali Mohd Rustam, 7th Yang di-Pertua Negeri of Malacca
- 2021: Ahmad Fuzi Abdul Razak, 8th Yang di-Pertua Negeri of Penang
- 2024: Wan Junaidi Tuanku Jaafar, 8th Yang di-Pertua Negeri of Sarawak
- 2024: Musa Aman, 11th Yang di-Pertua Negeri of Sabah
- 2025: Ramli Ngah Talib 9th Yang di-Pertua Negeri of Penang

=== Commanders (P.M.N.) ===
The commander receives the title Tan Sri and his wife Puan Sri.

- 1958: Abdul Aziz Abdul Majid
- 1958: Abdul Wahab Toh Muda Abdul Aziz
- 1958: Ahmad Perang
- 1958: Fatimah Hashim
- 1958: G. Shelley
- 1958: Gunn Lay Teik
- 1958: Mohamad Seth Mohamed Sa'aid
- 1958: Nik Ahmad Kamil
- 1958: S. Chelvasingam MacIntyre
- 1958: Syed Omar Shahabuddin
- 1958: Tunku Ismail Tunku Yahaya
- 1958: Tunku Ya'acob
- 1958: Michael Wong Pow Nee
- 1959: Ismail Abdul Rahman
- 1959: Omar Ong Yoke Lin
- 1959: Suleiman Abdul Rahman
- 1959: V. T. Sambanthan
- 1961: Sheikh Ahmad Mohd Hashim
- 1961: Lee Tiang Keng
- 1961: Loke Wan Tho
- 1961: Mohamed Din Ahmad
- 1961: Nik Mustapha Fadzil
- 1961: Sardon Jubir
- 1961: Tengku Indra Putra
- 1962: Abdul Jamil Abdul Rais
- 1962: Ahmad Husin
- 1962: Hassan Yunus
- 1962: Syed Sheh Shahabudin
- 1962: Zainal Abidin Ahmad
- 1963: Mohamed Noah Omar
- 1963: Mohamed Salleh Ismael
- 1964: Ismail Mohamed Ali
- 1964: Jugah Barieng
- 1964: Lee Kong Chian
- 1964: Tunku Osman
- 1964: Syed Jaafar Albar
- 1964: Syed Sheh Barakbah
- 1964: Mohammad Tahir Tan Tong Hye
- 1965: Ibrahim Fikri Mohamad
- 1965: Ghazali Shafie
- 1965: Runme Shaw
- 1965: Taib Andak
- 1965: Tay Teck Eng
- 1965: Tunku Mohamed Tunku Besar Burhanuddin
- 1965: Wee Chong Jin
- 1966: Abdul Kadir Yusof
- 1966: Mohd Sharif Abdul Samad
- 1966: Saw Seng Kew
- 1967: Azmi Mohamed
- 1967: Mohamed Said Mohamed
- 1968: Abdul Hamid Khan
- 1968: Lim Swee Aun
- 1970: Ibrahim Ismail
- 1970: Khaw Kai Boh
- 1970: Mohamed Ghazali Jawi
- 1970: V. Manickavasagam
- 1971: Mohammad Said Keruak
- 1971: Syed Nasir Ismail
- 1972: Abdul Kadir Shamsuddin
- 1972: Chik Mohamad Yusuf
- 1972: Ong Hock Thye
- 1972: Lee Siok Yew
- 1974: Abdul Rahman Hashim
- 1974: Lee Hun Hoe
- 1975: Ong Kee Hui
- 1975: Othman Saat
- 1975: Sarwan Singh Gill
- 1976: Mohammed Hanif Omar
- 1977: Abdul Rahman Ya'kub
- 1977: Abdullah Mohd Salleh
- 1977: Raja Mohar
- 1978: Mohd Sany Abdul Ghaffar
- 1979: Abang Ikhwan
- 1979: Abdullah Ayub
- 1979: Raja Azlan Shah
- 1981: Abdul Samad Idris
- 1981: Hashim Aman
- 1981: Mohd Ghazali Mohd Seth
- 1983: Hamzah Abu Samah
- 1983: Mohamed Salleh Abas
- 1984: Ismail Khan
- 1984: Mohamed Zahir Ismail
- 1984: Mohd Sunoh Marso
- 1985: Aishah Ghani
- 1985: Sallehuddin Mohamed
- 1986: Abdul Hamid Omar
- 1986: Khir Johari
- 1987: Mohd Ghazali Che Mat
- 1988: Hashim Mohd Ali
- 1988: Senu Abdul Rahman
- 1989: Abang Ahmad Urai
- 1989: Chan Siang Sun
- 1990: Ahmad Sarji Abdul Hamid
- 1990: Bahaman Samsudin
- 1990: Hashim Yeop Abdullah Sani
- 1990: Lee San Choon
- 1991: Tengku Ahmad Rithaudeen
- 1992: Abu Talib Othman
- 1992: Asri Muda
- 1992: Mohammed Jemuri Serjan
- 1992: Yaacob Mat Zain
- 1993: Abdul Rahman Abdul Hamid
- 1994: Borhan Ahmad
- 1994: Gunn Chit Tuan
- 1994: Musa Hitam
- 1994: Sulaiman Ninam Shah
- 1995: Abdul Rahim Mohd Noor
- 1995: Ismail Omar
- 1997: Abdul Halim Ali
- 1999: Lamin Mohd Yunus
- 1999: Mohtar Abdullah
- 2001: Mohd Zahidi Zainuddin
- 2001: Norian Mai
- 2001: Samsudin Osman
- 2004: Mohd Bakri Omar
- 2005: Abdul Gani Patail
- 2005: Mohd Anwar Mohd Nor
- 2007: Abdul Aziz Zainal
- 2007: Mohd Sidek Hassan
- 2007: Musa Hassan
- 2008: Rafidah Aziz
- 2009: Alauddin Mohd Sheriff
- 2009: Ong Ka Ting
- 2009: Syed Hamid Albar
- 2010: Azizan Ariffin
- 2010: Ismail Adam
- 2010: Joseph Pairin Kitingan
- 2011: Ismail Omar
- 2011: Harris Salleh
- 2012: Md Raus Sharif
- 2012: Zulkifeli Mohd Zin
- 2013: Ali Hamsa
- 2013: Lim Kok Wing
- 2014: Khalid Abu Bakar
- 2016: Mohamed Apandi Ali
- 2017: Mohamad Fuzi Harun
- 2017: Raja Mohamed Affandi
- 2017: Zulkefli Ahmad Makinudin
- 2019: Tengku Maimun Tuan Mat
- 2019: Ismail Bakar
- 2019: Zulkifli Zainal Abidin
- 2020: Mohd Zuki Ali
- 2020: Idrus Harun
- 2020: Affendi Buang
- 2020: Abdul Hamid Bador
- 2021: Abang Abdul Rahman Johari Abang Openg
- 2021: Acryl Sani Abdullah Sani
- 2024: Shamsul Azri Abu Bakar
- 2024: Mohammad Ab Rahman
- 2024: Razarudin Husain
- 2025: Mohd Dusuki Mokhtar
- 2025: Mohd Nizam Jaffar

== Honorary recipients ==
=== Honorary Grand Commanders (S.M.N. (K)) ===
- 1958: Lim Yew Hock, Chief Minister of Singapore
- 1959: Djuanda Kartawidjaja, Prime Minister of Indonesia
- 1960: Gerald Templer, British High Commissioner in Malaya
- 1962: Thanat Khoman, Foreign Minister of Thailand
- 1962: Thanom Kittikachorn, Prime Minister of Thailand
- 1963: Norodom Monineath, Queen consort of Cambodia
- 1964: Dhani Nivat, Member of the Thai royal family
- 1964: Hayato Ikeda, Prime Minister of Japan
- 1964: Masayoshi Ōhira, Foreign Minister of Japan
- 1964: Norodom Kantol, Prime Minister of Cambodia
- 1964: Prapas Charusathien, Commander in Chief of the Royal Thai Army
- 1964: Wan Waithayakon, Member of the Thai royal family
- 1965: Abdel Hakim Amer, Vice President of Egypt
- 1965: Ali Sabri, Vice President of Egypt
- 1965: Anwar Sadat, Vice President of Egypt
- 1965: Zein al-Sharaf Talal, Queen Mother of Jordan
- 1965: Firyal, Spouse of Muhammad bin Talal
- 1965: Hassan bin Talal, Crown Prince of Jordan
- 1965: Hassan Ibrahim, Vice President of Egypt
- 1965: Hussein el-Shafei, Vice President of Egypt
- 1965: Chung Il-kwon, Prime Minister of South Korea
- 1965: Muhammad bin Talal, Member of the Jordanian royal family
- 1965: Muna al-Hussein, Princess Consort of Jordan
- 1965: Nguyễn Cao Kỳ, Prime Minister of South Vietnam
- 1965: Hussein ibn Nasser, Prime Minister of Jordan
- 1965: Wasfi al-Tal, Prime Minister of Jordan
- 1965: Zakaria Mohieddin, Vice President of Egypt
- 1966: Chang Kay Young
- 1966: James Beveridge Thomson, Lord President of the Federal Court of Malaysia
- 1967: Albert II, Member of the Belgian royal family
- 1967: Eisaku Satō, Prime Minister of Japan
- 1970: Adam Malik, Foreign Minister of Indonesia
- 1970: Nawwaf bin Abdulaziz Al Saud, Member of the House of Saud
- 1971: Souvanna Phouma, Prime Minister of Laos
- 1975: Kukrit Pramoj, Prime Minister of Thailand
- 1979: Kriangsak Chamanan, Prime Minister of Thailand
- 1982: Fahd bin Abdulaziz Al Saud, Crown Prince of Saudi Arabia
- 1984: Elena Ceaușescu, First Lady of Romania
- 1984: Prem Tinsulanonda, Prime Minister of Thailand
- 1989: Jefri Bolkiah, Member of the Bruneian royal family
- 1995: Victoria, Crown Princess of Sweden
- 2000: Maha Vajiralongkorn, Crown Prince of Thailand
- 2000: Sultan bin Abdulaziz Al Saud, Member of the House of Saud
- 2001: Khalifa bin Salman Al Khalifa, Prime Minister of Bahrain
- 2003: Abdullah bin Abdulaziz Al Saud, Crown Prince of Saudi Arabia
- 2003: Silvio Berlusconi, Prime Minister of Italy
- 2003: Marcello Pera, President of the Italian Senate
- 2003: Pier Ferdinando Casini, President of the Italian Chamber of Deputies
- 2005: Victoria, Crown Princess of Sweden
- 2010: Moza bint Nasser, Consort to the Emir of Qatar
- 2011: Mohamed bin Zayed Al Nahyan, Crown Prince of Abu Dhabi
- 2012: Naruhito, Crown Prince of Japan
- 2012: Masako, Crown Princess of Japan
- 2023: Khaled bin Mohamed Al Nahyan, Crown Prince of Abu Dhabi

=== Honorary Commanders (P.M.N. (K)) ===
The honorary commander were also receives the title Tan Sri and his wife Puan Sri.

- 1958: A.H.P. Humphrey
- 1958: Abdul Hamid Jumat
- 1958: David Watherston
- 1958: F.H. Brooke
- 1958: James Beveridge Thomson
- 1958: James Cassels
- 1958: O.A. Spencer
- 1958: T.V.A. Brodie
- 1959: W.L.R. Carbonell
- 1959: Lord Ogmore
- 1959: Prijono
- 1961: Claude Fenner
- 1961: Douglas Waring
- 1961: H.A. Campbell
- 1961: John Hay
- 1961: Rodney Moore
- 1961: W.H. Wilcock
- 1962: Alexander Oppenheim
- 1962: L.C. Hoffman
- 1962: Luang Suranarong
- 1962: Stanley Edward Jewkes
- 1962: Syed Esa Almenoar
- 1963: Geofroy Tory
- 1963: George L. P. Weaver
- 1963: John Galvin
- 1963: Charles Bennett
- 1963: C.M. Sheridan
- 1963: Ngo Hou
- 1963: Samdech Penn Nouth
- 1963: Son Sann
- 1964: Dawee Chullasapya
- 1964: Kalya Israsena
- 1964: Peekdhip Malakul
- 1964: Nai Phairot Jayanama
- 1964: Presert Rujirawongse
- 1964: Swaeng Senanarong
- 1964: Nai Thitinant Na Ranong
- 1965: Abdel-Aziz El-Sayed
- 1965: Abdel-Maguid Farid
- 1965: Abdel-Monein Hassan Tawfik
- 1965: Abdul Wahab Al-Majali
- 1965: Ahmad Abdu El-Sharabassi
- 1965: Akef Al-Fayez
- 1965: Daoud Abu Ghazaleh
- 1965: Dhogan Hindawi
- 1965: El-Sayed Mohamed Youssef
- 1965: Habis Al-Majali
- 1965: Hazem Nuseibeh
- 1965: Mahmoud Fawzi
- 1965: Mahmoud Riad
- 1965: Mohamed Abdel Khalek Hassouna
- 1965: Mohamed Rashad Hassan
- 1965: Ngo Trong Anh
- 1965: Nguyễn Chánh Thi
- 1965: Nour-Eddine Tarraf
- 1965: Ra'ad bin Zeid
- 1965: S.F. Owens
- 1965: Saad Jumaa
- 1965: Sa`id Al-Mufti
- 1965: Salah El-Shahed
- 1965: Shawkat Sati
- 1965: Varyl Begg
- 1965: W.T. Philips
- 1965: Walter Colyear Walker
- 1966: Tran Kim Phuong
- 1967: John Grandy
- 1968: Philip Ernest Housden Pike
- 1971: Nai Puang Suwanrath
- 1972: John Baines Johnston
- 1972: Surakij Mayalarp
- 1977: Sumitro Djojohadikusumo
- 1979: Charoen Pongpanich
- 1979: Eikichi Hara
- 1979: Kōnosuke Matsushita
- 1979: Mohammad Jusuf
- 1979: Prem Tinsulanonda
- 1979: Sheikh Hassan Abdullah Al-Shaikh
- 1979: Yudhisthira Svasti
- 1981: Mohamed Al-Hamad Al-Subaili
- 1982: Abdul Muhsin bin Abdulaziz Al Saud
- 1982: Alsayed Ahmed Abdul Wahab
- 1982: Badr bin Abdulaziz Al Saud
- 1982: Salman bin Abdulaziz Al Saud
- 1982: Saud bin Faisal bin Abdulaziz Al Saud
- 1982: Sultan bin Abdulaziz Al Saud
- 1983: Leonardus Benjamin Moerdani
- 1983: Siddhi Savetsila
- 1983: Takeo Aritta
- 1984: Arthit Kamlang-ek
- 1984: Poniman
- 1986: Jürgen Warnke
- 1988: Chavalit Yongchaiyudh
- 1988: Try Sutrisno
- 1989: Etienne F. Glichitch
- 1989: Pengiran Ibnu Ba'asith Pengiran Apong
- 1991: Tadashi Kuranari
- 1993: Pao Sarasin
- 1994: Domingo Cavallo
- 1994: Masami Ishii
- 1999: Wiranto
- 2000: Datuk N Siva subramaniam
- 2007: Ahmed Mohammed Ali Al-Madani
- 2010: Yōhei Sasakawa
