= Raja Mohar =

Secretary-General to the Treasury of Malaysia from 1971 to 1972

Yang Amat Berbahagia Tun Raja Mohar Raja Badiozaman SSM PMN PSM SPCM SSSA JMN PPM

Secretary-General of the Treasury
- In office 1971–1972
- Preceded by: Mohd Shariff Abdul Samad
- Succeeded by: Chong Hon Nyan

Personal details
- Born: 23 March 1922 Kuala Kangsar, Perak, Federated Malay States
- Died: 8 June 2003 (aged 81) Pantai Medical Centre, Kuala Lumpur
- Resting place: Ampang Muslim Cemetery, Kuala Lumpur

Raja Mohar bin Raja Badiozaman (23 March 1922 – 8 June 2003) was serving as Secretary-General to the Treasury of Malaysia from 1971 to 1972.

== Honours ==
=== Honours of Malaysia ===
- Malaya
  - Companion of the Order of the Defender of the Realm (JMN) (1961)
- Malaysia
  - Grand Commander of the Order of Loyalty to the Crown of Malaysia (SSM) – Tun (1992)
  - Commander of the Order of the Defender of the Realm (PMN) – Tan Sri (1977)
  - Commander of the Order of Loyalty to the Crown of Malaysia (PSM) – Tan Sri (1967)
  - Recipient of the Malaysian Commemorative Medal (Silver) (PPM) (1965)
- Perak
  - Knight Grand Commander of the Order of Cura Si Manja Kini (SPCM) – Dato' Seri (1985)
- Selangor
  - Knight Grand Companion of the Order of Sultan Salahuddin Abdul Aziz Shah (SSSA) – Dato' Seri (1996)

=== Foreign honours ===
- Japan
  - First Class of the Order of the Sacred Treasure (1981)
