= Yang di-Pertua Negeri of Malacca =

Governor of Malacca

Governor of Malacca
- Yang di-Pertua Negeri Melaka
- Standard of the Yang di-Pertua Negeri

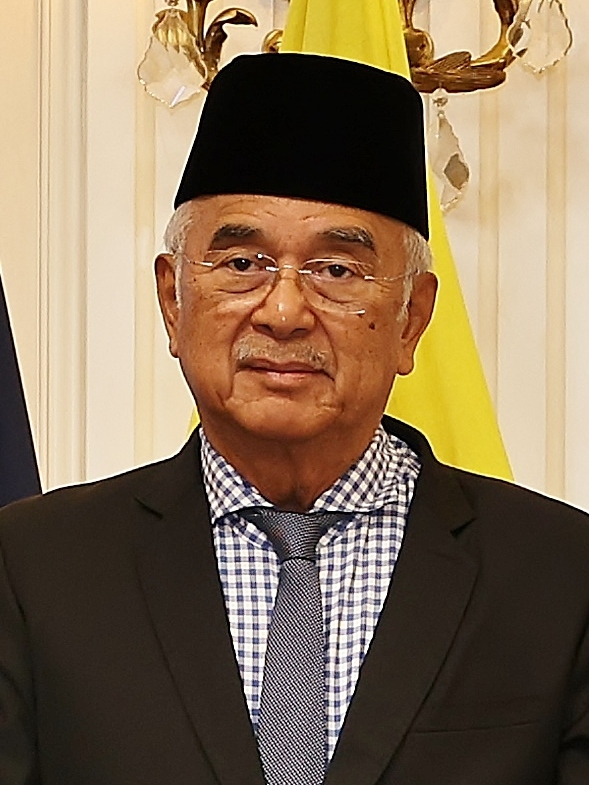
- Incumbent; Haji. Mohd. Ali Mohd. Rustam since 4 June 2020
- Style: Tuan Yang Terutama (His Excellency)
- Residence: Pejabat TYT Yang di-Pertua Negeri Melaka, Jalan Seri Negeri, Ayer Keroh, 75500 Melaka
- Appointer: Yang di-Pertuan Agong
- Inaugural holder: Leong Yew Koh
- Formation: 31 August 1957
- Website: www.tytmelaka.gov.my

The Governor of Malacca, officially Yang di-Pertua Negeri of Malacca (Malay: Yang di-Pertua Negeri Melaka), is the ceremonial head of state of the Malaysian state of Malacca. The Yang di-Pertua Negeri is styled Tuan Yang Terutama (TYT) (English: His Excellency).

The current office bearer, Mohd Ali Rustam, was sworn in on 4 June 2020.

== Appointment ==
The office of the Yang di-Pertua Negeri (governor) is established by the Constitution of Malacca. According to Article 1 (1) of the Constitution, the office must exist and be appointed by the Yang di-Pertuan Agong (King) after consultation with the chief minister. Every governor is appointed for a term of four years. However the king reserves the power to extend his term of appointment.

The governor has neither a deputy nor assistant. However, in event of his inability to govern the state due to illness, absence or any other cause, the king reserves the power to appoint a person to exercise the function of the governor.

== Functions, powers and privileges ==
Many functions and powers of the king – at the federal level – are delegated to the governor at the state level – like the other rulers of states. The governor, however, has no power and function towards the judiciary.

As he is the head of state, he is a member of the Conference of Rulers. He share the same power with the other members of the conference. However, he cannot be appointed the Yang di-Pertuan Agong.

Article 10 of the Constitution describes that the governor has to act according to the Constitution and makes decisions based on the advice from the Executive Council. However, he may also act on his own discretion in certain matters.

The Constitution provides the power to the governor to appoint key officers of the state. Most of them are appointed after consultation with the chief minister, except in appointing the chief minister. The same process occurred during dismissal of an officeholder.

The Constitution also describes powers of the governor in the state legislative assembly. All bills must be assented by the governor in 30 days after a bill passed. The governor also has to address the assembly annually.

== List of Yang di-Pertua Negeri ==
The following is the list of Yang di-Pertua Negeri of Malacca:

№	Portrait	Yang di-Pertua Negeri (Birth–Death)	Term of office		
№	Portrait	Yang di-Pertua Negeri (Birth–Death)	Took office	Left office	Time in office
1		Tun; Leong Yew Koh (1888–1963)	31 August 1957	30 August 1959	2 years, 0 days
2		Tun; Abdul Malek Yusuf (1899–1977)	31 August 1959	30 August 1971	12 years, 0 days
3		Tun; Abdul Aziz Abdul Majid (1908–1975)	31 August 1971	9 May 1975	3 years, 252 days
4		Tun; Syed Zahiruddin Syed Hassan (1918–2013)	23 May 1975	30 November 1984	9 years, 192 days
5		Tun Datuk Seri Utama; Syed Ahmad Syed Mahmud Shahabuddin (1925–2008)	4 December 1984	3 June 2004	19 years, 183 days
6		Tun Datuk Seri Utama; Mohd Khalil Yaakob (born 1937)	4 June 2004	4 June 2020	16 years, 0 days
7		Tun Seri Setia Haji; Mohd. Ali Mohd. Rustam (born 1949)	4 June 2020	Incumbent	6 years, 97 days

=== Living former Yang di-Pertua Negeri ===
Name	Term of office	Date of birth
Mohd Khalil Yaakob	2004–2020	29 December 1937 (age 88)

== See also ==
- Yang di-Pertua Negeri
