= Machap (Malacca state constituency) =

Malacca constituency

Defunct state constituency
- Legislature: Malacca State Legislative Assembly
- Constituency created: 1974
- Constituency abolished: 2018
- First contested: 1974
- Last contested: 2013

Machap was a state constituency in Malacca, Malaysia, that has been represented in the Melaka State Legislative Assembly.

The state constituency was first contested in 1974 and is mandated to return a single Assemblyman to the Melaka State Legislative Assembly under the first-past-the-post voting system.

== History ==
Members of the Legislative Assembly for Machap
Assembly	No	Years	Member	Party
Constituency created from Sungai Bahru
4th	N03	1974-1988	Yeow Kay (姚繼)	BN (MCA)
5th	N03	1978-1982	Ng Kim Fong (吳金峰)	BN (MCA)
6th	N03	1982-1986	Ng Kim Fong (吳金峰)	BN (MCA)
Constituency abolished, renamed to Bukit Sedanan
Constituency re-created from Bukit Sedanan
11th	N08	2004 – 2007	Poh Ah Tiam (傅潤添)	BN (MCA)
11th	N08	2007 - 2008	Lai Meng Chong (賴明忠)	BN (MCA)
12th	N08	2008 – 2013	Lai Meng Chong (賴明忠)	BN (MCA)
13th	N08	2013 – 2018	Lai Meng Chong (賴明忠)	BN (MCA)
Constituency renamed to Machap Jaya

== Election results ==
The electoral results for the Machap Jaya Malacca state constituency in 2008 are 2013 are as follows.

Malacca state election, 2013
Party	Candidate	Votes	%	∆%
BN	Lai Meng Chong	5,003	50.46	▼10.08
PKR	Ginie Lim Siew Lin	4,851	48.93	▲9.47
KITA	Ravinther Sekaran	61	0.61	▲0.62
Total valid votes		9,915	100.00	
Total rejected ballots		208		
Unreturned ballots		18		
Turnout		10,141	86.81	▲9.71
Registered electors		11,682		
Majority		152	1.53	▼19.55
BN hold		Swing		
Source(s) "Federal Government Gazette - Notice of Contested Election, State Legislative Assembly for the State of Selangor [P.U. (B) 192/2013]" (PDF). Attorney General's Chambers of Malaysia. 26 April 2013. Archived from the original (PDF) on 2019-12-29. "Federal Government Gazette - Results of Contested Election and Statements of the Poll after the Official Addition of Votes, State Constituencies for the State of Selangor [P.U. (B) 233/2013]". Attorney General's Chambers of Malaysia. 22 May 2013. Archived from the original (PDF) on 2018-10-02."undi.info N07 Machap".

Malacca state election, 2008
Party	Candidate	Votes	%	∆%
BN	Lai Meng Chong	4,707	60.54	▼18.67
PKR	Ginie Lim Siew Lin	3,068	39.46	▲39.46
Total valid votes		7,775	100.00	
Total rejected ballots		201		
Unreturned ballots		10		
Turnout		7,986	77.10	▲2.75
Registered electors		10,358		
Majority		1,639	21.08	▼37.35
BN hold		Swing		
Source(s) "undi.info N07 Machap".

Malacca state by-election, 12 April 2007 Upon the death of incumbent, Poh Ah Tiam
Party	Candidate	Votes	%	∆%
BN	Lai Meng Chong	5,533	79.21	▼2.77
DAP	Liou Chen Kuang	1,452	20.79	▲2.77
Total valid votes		6,985	100.00	
Total rejected ballots		166		
Unreturned ballots		4		
Turnout		7,155	74.35	▲0.02
Registered electors		9,623		
Majority		4,081	58.43	▼5.54
BN hold		Swing		
Source(s) "undi.info N07 Machap".

Malacca state election, 2004
Party	Candidate	Votes	%	∆%
BN	Poh Ah Tiam	5,847	81.98	
DAP	Liou Chen Kuang	1,285	18.02	
Total valid votes		7,132	100.00	
Total rejected ballots		202		
Unreturned ballots		16		
Turnout		7,350	74.33	
Registered electors		9,889		
Majority		4,562	63.97	
BN hold		Swing		

Malacca state election, 1982
Party	Candidate	Votes	%	∆%
BN	Ng Kim Fong	3,757	62.10	▲9.27
DAP	Lim Swee	1,369	22.63	▼7.48
PAS	Ahmad Baba	709	11.72	▼5.34
Independent	Khoo Peck Wan	215	3.55	▲3.55
Total valid votes		6,050	100.00	
Total rejected ballots		148		
Unreturned ballots		0		
Turnout		6,198	76.89	▼2.60
Registered electors		8,061		
Majority		2,388	39.47	▲16.75
BN hold		Swing		

Malacca state election, 1978
Party	Candidate	Votes	%	∆%
BN	Ng Kim Fong	2,734	52.83	▼14.19
DAP	Wu Tek Mee	1,558	30.11	▲30.11
PAS	Ahmad Baba	883	17.06	▲17.06
Total valid votes		5,175	100.00	
Total rejected ballots		297		
Unreturned ballots		0		
Turnout		5,472	79.49	▼2.57
Registered electors		6,884		
Majority		1,176	22.72	▼20.65
BN hold		Swing		

Malacca state election, 1974
Party	Candidate	Votes	%
BN	Yeow Kay	3,006	67.02
PEKEMAS	Ahad Osman	1,061	23.66
Independent	Amat Muin	418	9.32
Total valid votes		4,485	100.00
Total rejected ballots		262	
Unreturned ballots		0	
Turnout		4,747	82.06
Registered electors		5,785	
Majority		1,945	43.37
This was a new constituency created.
