= Ngwe Hee Sem =

Malaysian politician

Yang Berhormat Datuk Ngwe Hee Sem DMSM KMN BCM MLA
- 魏喜森

Member of the Malacca State Executive Council
- In office 5 April 2023 – 14 November 2026 (Health, Human Resources and Unity)
- Governor: Mohd Ali Rustam
- Deputy: Siti Faizah Abdul Azis
- Chief Minister: Ab Rauf Yusoh
- Preceded by: Himself (Human Resources and Unity); Muhamad Akmal Saleh (Health)
- Constituency: Machap Jaya
- In office 26 November 2021 – 31 March 2023 (Unity, Human Resources, Community Relations and Consumer Affairs)
- Governor: Mohd Ali Rustam
- Chief Minister: Sulaiman Md Ali
- Preceded by: Ismail Othman
- Succeeded by: Himself (Human Resources and Unity); Allex Seah Shoo Chin (Consumer Affairs); Portfolio abolished (Community Relations)
- Constituency: Machap Jaya

Member of the Malacca State Legislative Assembly for Machap Jaya
- Incumbent
- Assumed office 20 November 2021
- Preceded by: Ginie Lim Siew Lin (PH–PKR)
- Majority: 938 (2021); 2,236 (2026)

Faction represented in Malacca State Legislative Assembly
- 2021–: Barisan Nasional

Personal details
- Born: Ngwe Hee Sem; 2 January 1968 (age 58) Machap Jaya, Alor Gajah, Malacca, Malaysia
- Party: Malaysian Chinese Association (MCA)
- Other political affiliations: Barisan Nasional (BN)
- Education: Bachelor of Business Administration in Economics
- Alma mater: University of Tennessee at Martin
- Occupation: Politician
- Ngwe Hee Sem on Facebook

Ngwe Hee Sem

Chinese name
- Traditional Chinese: 魏喜森
- Simplified Chinese: 魏喜森
- Hanyu Pinyin: Wèi Xǐ Sēn
- Wade–Giles: Wei4 Hsi3 Sên
- Jyutping: Ngai6 Hei2 Sam1
- Hokkien POJ: Gūi Hí-sim
- Tâi-lô: Guī Hí-sim

Ngwe Hee Sem (Chinese: 魏喜森; pinyin: Wèi Xǐ Sēn; Wade–Giles: Wei⁴ Hsi³ Sên; Jyutping: Ngai6 Hei2 Sam1; Pe̍h-ōe-jī: Gūi Hí-sim or Ah Sem, born 2 January 1968) is a Malaysian politician who has served as Member of the Malacca State Executive Council (EXCO) in the Barisan Nasional (BN) state administration under Chief Minister Ab Rauf Yusoh since April 2023 for the second term and under former Chief Minister Sulaiman Md Ali from November 2021 to March 2023 for the first term as well as Member of the Malacca State Legislative Assembly (MLA) for Machap Jaya since November 2021. He is a member of the Malaysian Chinese Association (MCA), a component party of the BN coalition. He is Member of the Central Committee, Organising Secretary of MCA of Malacca and Division Vice Chief of MCA of Alor Gajah. He is also the sole Malacca EXCO Member of MCA, one of the only two Malacca EXCO Members of Chinese descent along with Allex Seah Shoo Chin and one of the only two MLAs of MCA along with Kelebang MLA Lim Ban Hong.

== Political career ==
Ngwe was elected to the Malacca State Legislative Assembly in the 2021 state election, winning the seat of Machap Jaya from incumbent Ginie Lim Siew Lin of the Pakatan Harapan (PH) opposition coalition who did not recontest. In addition, he was also appointed as Member of the Melaka State EXCO in charge of Unity, Human Resources, Community Relations and Consumer Affairs by 12th Chief Minister Sulaiman on 26 November 2021. He was reappointed as an EXCO Member in charge of Health, Human Resources and Unity by 13th Chief Minister Ab Rauf on 5 April 2023.

== Election results ==
Malacca State Legislative Assembly
Year	Constituency	Candidate	Votes	Pct	Opponent(s)	Votes	Pct	Ballots cast	Majority	Turnout
2021	N08 Machap Jaya	Ngwe Hee Sem (MCA)	3,732	46.67%	Law Bing Haw (PKR)	2,794	34.94%	7,996	938	64.04%
2021	N08 Machap Jaya	Ngwe Hee Sem (MCA)	3,732	46.67%	Tai Siong Jiul (BERSATU)	1,202	15.03%	7,996	938	64.04%
2021	N08 Machap Jaya	Ngwe Hee Sem (MCA)	3,732	46.67%	Abd Aziz Osani Kasim (IMAN)	167	2.96%	7,996	938	64.04%
2021	N08 Machap Jaya	Ngwe Hee Sem (MCA)	3,732	46.67%	Azlan Daud (IND)	101	1.26%	7,996	938	64.04%
2026	N08 Machap Jaya	Ngwe Hee Sem (MCA)	6,686	58.56%	Ginie Lim Siew Lin (PKR)	4,450	38.98%	11,417	2,236	71.89%
2026	N08 Machap Jaya	Ngwe Hee Sem (MCA)	6,686	58.56%	Prasanth Kumar Brakasam (BERSAMA)	281	2.46%	11,417	2,236	71.89%

== Honours ==
- Malaysia
  - Officer of the Order of the Defender of the Realm (KMN) (2012)
- Malacca
  - Companion of the Exalted Order of Malacca (DMSM) – Datuk (2024)
  - Recipient of the Distinguished Service Star (BCM) (2006)

== See also ==
- Machap Jaya (state constituency)
