= Muhammad Jailani Khamis =

Malaysian politician

Yang Berbahagia Datuk Muhammad Jailani Khamis DMSM
- محمد جايلاني خميس

Member of the Malacca State Executive Council (Tourism, Heritage and Culture)
- In office 26 November 2021 – 31 March 2023
- Governor: Mohd Ali Rustam
- Chief Minister: Sulaiman Md Ali
- Preceded by: Himself
- Succeeded by: Abdul Razak Abdul Rahman
- Constituency: Rembia
- In office 13 March 2020 – 21 November 2021
- Governor: Mohd Khalil Yaakob (2020); Mohd Ali Rustam (2020–2021)
- Chief Minister: Sulaiman Md Ali
- Preceded by: Himself
- Succeeded by: Himself
- Constituency: Rembia
- In office 16 May 2018 – 2 March 2020
- Governor: Mohd Khalil Yaakob
- Chief Minister: Adly Zahari
- Preceded by: Idris Haron
- Succeeded by: Himself
- Constituency: Rembia

Member of the Malacca State Legislative Assembly for Rembia
- In office 9 May 2018 – 14 November 2026
- Preceded by: Norpipah Abdol (BN–UMNO)
- Majority: 1,814 (2018); 860 (2021)

Faction represented in Malacca State Legislative Assembly
- 2018–2020: Pakatan Harapan
- 2020–2021: Independent
- 2021–2023: Barisan Nasional
- 2023–2026: Perikatan Nasional

Personal details
- Born: Muhammad Jailani bin Khamis; 26 May 1972 (age 54) Malacca, Malaysia
- Citizenship: Malaysian
- Party: United Malays National Organisation (UMNO) (–2016, 2021–2023); People's Justice Party (PKR) (2017–2020); Independent (2020–2021); Malaysian Islamic Party (PAS) (since 2023)
- Other political affiliations: Barisan Nasional (BN) (–2016, 2021–2023); Pakatan Harapan (PH) (2017–2020); Perikatan Nasional (PN) (since 2023)
- Occupation: Politician
- Muhammad Jailani Khamis on Facebook

Muhammad Jailani bin Khamis (born 26 May 1972) is a Malaysian politician who has served as Member of the Malacca State Legislative Assembly (MLA) for Rembia since May 2018. He served as Member of the Malacca State Executive Council (EXCO) in the Barisan Nasional (BN) state administration under former Chief Minister Sulaiman Md Ali from November 2021 to March 2023 for the third term, from March 2020 to November 2021 for the second term and under former Chief Minister Adly Zahari from May 2018 to the collapse of the Pakatan Harapan (PH) state administration in March 2020 for the first term. He is a member of the Malaysian Islamic Party (PAS), a component party of the Perikatan Nasional (PN) coalition. He was a member of the United Malays National Organisation (UMNO), a component party of the BN coalition before leaving UMNO for PAS and of the People's Justice Party (PKR), a component party of the PH coalition before leaving PKR and becoming an independent and supporting the BN coalition for nine months and later joining UMNO. He is presently the only Melaka MLA of PAS and one of the only three Melaka Opposition and PN MLAs alongside State Leader of the Opposition and Bemban MLA Mohd Yadzil Yaakub and Sungai Udang MLA Mohd Aleef Yusof.

== Political career ==
In November 2019, Muhammad Jailani and Machap Jaya MLA Ginie Lim Siew Lin were absent in the state legislative assembly meeting. Their absence resulted in the defeat of a motion from the then PH state government to nominate then-Malacca state PKR liaison chief, Halim Bachik as a Senator. PKR President Anwar Ibrahim met them on the issue and described it as unacceptable. During the 2020 Malaysian political crisis in March 2020, Jailani played an instrumental role in the collapse of the democratically elected PH state administration led by Chief Minister Adly as he was one of the MLAs who left PH. He left PH and resulted Adly in his loss of majority support in the assembly. Adly was then forced to resign as Chief Minister and the administration collapsed. He switched his allegiance to BN as an independent MLA. BN later returned to power together with Perikatan Nasional (PN) as a state coalition government. Sulaiman of BN was then appointed as new Chief Minister to replace Adly. He was later reappointed as an EXCO member for the same portfolios. In 2021, he rejoined BN and UMNO. In the 2021 Malacca state election, he was nominated by BN as a candidate to defend the Rembia state seat and he was reelected as the Rembia MLA and reappointed again as an EXCO member for the same portfolios. On 29 March 2023, Sulaiman was confirmed to have resigned as Chief Minister. Muhammad Jailani labelled the incoming Chief Minister Ab Rauf Yusoh as a 'backdoor' leader. The phrase was prominent during the political crisis and was often used to describe a government or politician who hold power or office without being democratically elected and given the electoral mandate by the people. Fellow EXCO member and Merlimau MLA Muhamad Akmal Saleh hit back at Muhammad Jailani and explained that no MLAs were involved in toppling Sulaiman and pressuring him to resign as well as reminding him of his pivotal role in the collapse of the PH state administration in March 2020. On 31 March 2023, Tanjung Bidara MLA Ab Rauf was appointed as the Chief Minister to replace Sulaiman. He alleged that Ab Rauf had pressured and toppled Sulaiman and declared that he was not supporting Ab Rauf and his government although he is a BN and government MLA. On 5 April 2023, Ab Rauf appointed his EXCO lineup and as widely expected, dropped Muhammad Jailani from the lineup.

During a press conference in Parliament attended by PN Members of Parliament (MPs) on 16 July 2024, Secretary-General of PAS Takiyuddin Hassan announced that Muhammad Jailani had left BN and UMNO for PN and PAS more than a year ago on 10 June 2023, a month before the state legislative assembly rectified the anti-party hopping law. Muhamad Akmal criticised Muhammad Jailani for doing so and reiterated that Muhammad Jailani was a 'political frog' and the infamous role the latter played in overthrowing the PH state administration. Muhamad Akmal also asked for a Rembia by-election to be called to elect the new Rembia MLA regardless of whether Muhammad Jailani had gone against the law or not. Muhamad Akmal challenged Muhammad Jailani to contest in the election for a new electoral mandate from the Rembia voters if he was a 'gentleman'. Chief Minister Ab Rauf added that all the BN candidates in the 2021 Malacca state election had signed a letter of undertaking, pledging not to party-hop and leave BN if elected as an MLA or face the costs incurred by BN. He also stressed that the departure of Muhammad Jailani from BN did nothing to affect his state government and extended his appreciation for the service of Muhammad Jailani in the state government as well leaving the fate of Muhammad Jailani to Speaker of the assembly Ibrahim Durum and the Supreme Council of UMNO. Member of the Supreme Council of UMNO Ahmad Maslan revealed that BN would ask for a cost of RM 100 million from Muhammad Jailani through legal means. Secretary-General of UMNO Asyraf Wajdi Dusuki presented the evidence and the letter Muhammad Jailani signed and asked for him to pay RM 100 million to UMNO or face legal action from UMNO. Muhammad Jailani fearlessly accepted the legal action from UMNO and promised to expose the 'dirty tactics' used by UMNO in the court.

On 27 December 2024, during a sitting of the assembly, he was involved in a shouting match with Muhamad Akmal, whom he was labelled as a 'traitor'.

== Election results ==
Malacca State Legislative Assembly
Year	Constituency	Candidate	Votes	Pct	Opponent(s)	Votes	Pct	Ballots cast	Majority	Turnout
2018	N06 Rembia	Muhammad Jailani Khamis (PKR)	6,773	52.37%	Norpipah Abdol (UMNO)	4,959	38.35%	13,175	1,814	84.26%
2018	N06 Rembia	Muhammad Jailani Khamis (PKR)	6,773	52.37%	Mohammad Rashidi Abd Razak (PAS)	1,200	9.28%	13,175	1,814	84.26%
2021	N06 Rembia	Muhammad Jailani Khamis (UMNO)	4,224	41.61%	Zamri Pakiri (PKR)	3,364	33.13%	10,152	860	64.43%
2021	N06 Rembia	Muhammad Jailani Khamis (UMNO)	4,224	41.61%	Zamzuri Arifin (BERSATU)	2,433	23.97%	10,152	860	64.43%
2021	N06 Rembia	Muhammad Jailani Khamis (UMNO)	4,224	41.61%	Murali Krishnan (IND)	67	0.66%	10,152	860	64.43%
2021	N06 Rembia	Muhammad Jailani Khamis (UMNO)	4,224	41.61%	Sabarudin Kudus (IND)	64	0.63%	10,152	860	64.43%

== Honours ==
=== Honours of Malaysia ===
- Malacca
  - Companion of the Exalted Order of Malacca (DMSM) – Datuk (2018)
