= Fairul Nizam Roslan =

Malaysian politician (born 1978)

Yang Berhormat Datuk Fairul Nizam Roslan DMSM PPN PJK MLA
- فائِر النظام رسلان

Member of the Malacca State Executive Council
- In office 5 April 2023 – 14 November 2026 (Science, Technology, Innovation and Digital Communications)
- Governor: Mohd Ali Rustam
- Chief Minister: Ab Rauf Yusoh
- Deputy: Mohd Noor Helmy Abdul Halem
- Preceded by: Rais Yasin (Science, Technology and Innovation); Portfolio established (Digital Communications)
- Constituency: Asahan

Member of the Malacca State Legislative Assembly for Asahan
- Incumbent
- Assumed office 20 November 2021
- Preceded by: Abdul Ghafar Atan (BN–UMNO)
- Majority: 2,993 (2021); 9,158 (2026)

Faction represented in Malacca State Legislative Assembly
- 2021–: Barisan Nasional

Personal details
- Born: 2 August 1978 (age 48) Malacca, Malaysia
- Party: United Malays National Organisation (UMNO)
- Other political affiliations: Barisan Nasional (BN)
- Occupation: Politician
- Nickname: Along

Fairul Nizam bin Roslan (born 2 August 1978), familiarly known as Along, is a Malaysian politician who has served as a Member of the Malacca State Executive Council (EXCO) in the Barisan Nasional (BN) state administration under Chief Minister Ab Rauf Yusoh since April 2023 and Member of the Malacca State Legislative Assembly (MLA) for Asahan since November 2021. He is a member and the Division Chief Alor Gajah of the United Malays National Organisation (UMNO), a component party of the BN coalition. He was also the State Youth Chief of UMNO of Malacca.

== Political career ==
Fairul Nizam was elected to the Malacca State Legislative Assembly in the 2021 Melaka state election on 20 November 2021, winning the seat of Asahan from Abdul Ghafar Atan also of the BN coalition who was retiring as an MLA and defeating Idris Haron, the former Chief Minister of Malacca and the Pakatan Harapan (PH) candidate for the seat. He was later appointed as Malacca State EXCO in charge of Science, Technology, Innovation and Digital Communications by the 13th Chief Minister Ab Rauf on 5 April 2023.

== Election results ==
Malacca State Legislative Assembly
Year	Constituency	Candidate	Votes	Pct	Opponent(s)	Votes	Pct	Ballots cast	Majority	Turnout
2021	N10 Asahan	Fairul Nizam Roslan (UMNO)	5,659	65.77%	Idris Haron (PKR)	2,666	30.99%	8,604	2,993	65.18%
2021	N10 Asahan	Fairul Nizam Roslan (UMNO)	5,659	65.77%	Dhanesh Basil (Gerakan)	1,364	15.83%	8,604	2,993	65.18%
2021	N10 Asahan	Fairul Nizam Roslan (UMNO)	5,659	65.77%	Mohd Akhir Ayob (IND)	136	1.58%	8,604	2,993	65.18%
2021	N10 Asahan	Fairul Nizam Roslan (UMNO)	5,659	65.77%	Azmar Ab Hamid (IND)	99	1.15%	8,604	2,993	65.18%
2021	N10 Asahan	Fairul Nizam Roslan (UMNO)	5,659	65.77%	Mohd Noor Salleh (IND)	44	0.51%	8,604	2,993	65.18%
2026	N10 Asahan	Fairul Nizam Roslan (UMNO)	11,731	82.01%	Denesh Palasubraniam (PKR)	2,573	17.99%	14,304	9,158	71.56%

== Honours ==
- Malaysia
  - Medal of the Order of the Defender of the Realm (PPN) (2021)
- Malacca
  - Companion of the Exalted Order of Malacca (DMSM) – Datuk (2023)
  - Recipient of the Meritorious Service Medal (PJK) (2014)
