= Lai Meng Chong =

Malaysian politician (born 1951)

Yang Berbahagia Datuk Lai Meng Chong DMSM DSM PJK AMN
- 赖明忠

Member of the Malacca State Legislative Assembly for Machap
- In office 12 April 2007 – 8 May 2018
- Preceded by: Poh Ah Tiam (BN–MCA)
- Succeeded by: Ginie Lim Siew Lin (PH–PKR)
- Majority: 4,081 (2007); 1,639 (2008); 152 (2013)

Personal details
- Born: 3 September 1951 (age 74) Malacca, Federation of Malaya (now Malaysia)
- Party: Malaysian Chinese Association (MCA)
- Other political affiliations: Barisan Nasional (BN); Perikatan Nasional (PN)
- Occupation: Politician

Lai Meng Chong (Chinese: 賴明忠; pinyin: Lài Míngzhōng; born 3 September 1951) is a Malaysian politician of Chinese descent from the town of Machap Baru in Malacca state. He is a member of the Malaysian Chinese Association (MCA), a major component party of the ruling Barisan Nasional (BN) coalition and holds the position of vice-chairman in the MCA's Alor Gajah division. Lai is also the political secretary to the Malaysian Minister of Human Resources, MCA vice-president and MP for Alor Gajah, Datuk Seri Dr Fong Chan Onn. He was nominated as the BN's candidate in the 2007 Machap by-election.

== Election results ==
Malacca State Legislative Assembly
Year	Constituency	Candidate	Votes	Pct	Opponent(s)	Votes	Pct	Ballots cast	Majority	Turnout
2007	N08 Machap	Lai Meng Chong (MCA)	5,533	79.21%	Liou Chen Kuang (DAP)	1,452	20.79%	7,151	4,081	74.31%
2008	N08 Machap	Lai Meng Chong (MCA)	4,707	60.54%	Ginie Lim Siew Lin (PKR)	3,068	39.46%	7,986	1,639	77.10%
2013	N08 Machap	Lai Meng Chong (MCA)	5,003	50.46%	Ginie Lim Siew Lin (PKR)	4,851	48.93%	10,123	152	86.65%
2013	N08 Machap	Lai Meng Chong (MCA)	5,003	50.46%	Ravinther Sekaran (KITA)	61	0.61%	10,123	152	86.65%

== Honours ==
- Malaysia
  - Member of the Order of the Defender of the Realm (AMN) (1997)
- Malacca
  - Companion Class I of the Exalted Order of Malacca (DMSM) – Datuk (2009)
  - Member of the Exalted Order of Malacca (DSM) (2000)
  - Recipient of the Meritorious Service Medal (PJK)

== See also ==
- 2007 Machap by-election
- Machap Jaya (state constituency)
