= Tangga Batu =

Federal constituency of Malacca, Malaysia

Tangga Batu (P136)
Malacca constituency

Federal constituency
- Legislature: Dewan Rakyat
- MP: Bakri Jamaluddin; PN
- Constituency created: 2003
- First contested: 2004
- Last contested: 2022

Demographics
- Population (2020): 198,033
- Electors (2026): 124,407
- Area (km²): 121
- Pop. density (per km²): 1,636.6

Tangga Batu is a federal constituency in Central Melaka District, Malacca, Malaysia, that has been represented in the Dewan Rakyat since 2004.

The federal constituency was created in the 2003 redistribution and is mandated to return a single member to the Dewan Rakyat under the first past the post voting system.

== Demographics ==
Ethnic breakdown of Tangga Batu's electorate as of 2022
1. Malay (71.9%)
2. Chinese (22.3%)
3. Indian (3.70%)
4. Other ethnicities (2.10%)

As of 2020, Tangga Batu has a population of 198,033 people.

Age breakdown of Tangga Batu's electorate as of 2022
1. 18-20 (7.27%)
2. 21-29 (24.9%)
3. 30-39 (24.1%)
4. 40-49 (17.1%)
5. 50-59 (12.4%)
6. 60-69 (8.79%)
7. 70-79 (4.05%)
8. 80-89 (1.22%)
9. above 90 (0.19%)
Gender breakdown of Tangga Batu's electorate as of 2022
1. Male (51.3%)
2. Female (48.7%)

== History ==
=== Polling districts ===
According to the gazette issued on 5 November 2026, the Tangga Batu constituency has a total of 24 polling districts.

| State constituency | Polling districts | Code | Location |
|---|---|---|---|
| Sungai Udang（N11） | Bukit Terendak | 136/11/01 | SJK (C) Sungai Udang; SMK Sungai Udang |
| Sungai Udang（N11） | Pekan Sungai Udang | 136/11/02 | SK Sungai Udang |
| Sungai Udang（N11） | Paya Rumput Jaya | 136/11/03 | SRA (JAIM) Al Ahmdi |
| Sungai Udang（N11） | Bertam Hulu | 136/11/04 | SK Bertam Hulu |
| Pantai Kundor (N12) | Ayer Salak | 136/12/01 | SJK (C) St. Mary |
| Pantai Kundor (N12) | Paya Luboh | 136/12/02 | SK Tangga Batu |
| Pantai Kundor (N12) | Pantai Puteri | 136/12/03 | SK Pantai Kundor |
| Pantai Kundor (N12) | Kampung Gelam | 136/12/04 | SK Kampong Gelam |
| Pantai Kundor (N12) | Pengkalan Peringi | 136/12/05 | SRA (JAIM) Pantai Rombang |
| Pantai Kundor (N12) | Pengkalan Lanjut | 136/12/06 | SJK (C) Ek Te |
| Pantai Kundor (N12) | Sungai Lereh | 136/12/07 | SK Lereh |
| Paya Rumput (N13) | Hujong Padang | 136/13/01 | SK Paya Rumput; SMK Paya Rumput |
| Paya Rumput (N13) | Krubong | 136/13/02 | SK Krubong; SMK Krubong; Dewan Komuniti PPR Krubong |
| Paya Rumput (N13) | Pantai Cheng | 136/13/03 | SK Cheng |
| Paya Rumput (N13) | Cheng Perdana | 136/13/04 | SK Tanjung Minyak |
| Paya Rumput (N13) | Cheng | 136/13/05 | SMK Tun Haji Abdul Malek |
| Paya Rumput (N13) | Tanjung Minyak | 136/13/06 | SK Tanjung Minyak 2; SRA (JAIM) Tanjung Minyak 2; Dewan Bunga Tanjung, Tanjung Minyak Jaya |
| Kelebang (N14) | Seberang Gajah | 136/14/01 | SK Taman Bukit Rambai; SMK Bukit Rambai |
| Kelebang (N14) | Bukit Rambai | 136/14/02 | SK Bukit Rambai; SJK (C) Ying Chye |
| Kelebang (N14) | Kampung Pinang | 136/14/03 | SMK Klebang Besar |
| Kelebang (N14) | Klebang Besar | 136/14/04 | SR Arab Batang Tiga Timur |
| Kelebang (N14) | Pulau Gadong | 136/14/05 | SRA (JAIM) Klebang Besar |
| Kelebang (N14) | Pekan Klebang Besar | 136/14/06 | SK Klebang Besar |
| Kelebang (N14) | Klebang Kechil | 136/14/07 | SJK (C) Lih Jen |

=== Representation history ===
Members of Parliament for Tangga Batu
| Parliament | No | Years | Member | Party | Vote Share |
Constituency created from Batu Berendam and Alor Gajah
| 11th | P136 | 2004–2008 | Idris Haron (إدريس هارون) | BN (UMNO) | 33,039; 79.36% |
| 12th | P136 | 2008–2013 | Idris Haron (إدريس هارون) | BN (UMNO) | 30,460; 65.62% |
| 13th | P136 | 2013–2018 | Abu Bakar Mohamad Diah (ابو بكر محمد ديه) | BN (UMNO) | 39,468; 62.35% |
| 14th | P136 | 2018–2022 | Rusnah Aluai (روسنه ألواي) | PH (PKR) | 32,420; 46.89% |
| 15th | P136 | 2022–present | Bakri Jamaluddin (بكري جمال الدين) | PN (PAS) | 37,406; 40.65% |

=== State constituency ===
| Parliamentary constituency | State constituency | | | | | | |
| Parliamentary constituency | 1955–59* | 1959–1974 | 1974–1986 | 1986–1995 | 1995–2004 | 2004–2018 | 2018–present |
|---|---|---|---|---|---|---|---|
| Tangga Batu | | | | | | Kelebang | |
| Tangga Batu | | | | | | Pantai Kundor | |
| Tangga Batu | | | | | | Paya Rumput | |
| Tangga Batu | | | | | | Sungai Udang | |

=== Historical boundaries ===
| State Constituency | Area | |
| State Constituency | 2003 | 2018 |
|---|---|---|
| Kelebang | Ayer Salak; Bukir Rambai; Kampung Pinang; Klebang; Pulau Gadong | Bukir Rambai; Kampung Pinang; Klebang; Pulau Gadong; Taman Rembia Ria |
| Pantai Kundor | Pantai Kundor; Pantai Puteri; Tanah Merah; Tangga Batu; Tanjung Kling | Ayer Salak; Pantai Kundor; Tanah Merah; Tangga Batu; Tanjung Kling |
| Paya Rumput | Cheng; Krubong; Paya Rumput; Taman Bertam Perdana; Taman Perindustrian Bukit Rambai | Cheng; Krubong; Paya Rumput; Taman Cheng Utama; Tanjung Minyak |
| Sungai Udang | Bukit Terendak; Paya Rumput Jaya; Taman Terendak Permai; Terendak; Sungai Udang | Terendak; Sungai Udang; Taman Bertam Perdana; Taman Sri Bertam; Taman Perindustrian Bukit Rambai |

=== Current state assembly members ===
| No. | State Constituency | Member | Coalition (Party) |
|---|---|---|---|
| N11 | Sungai Udang | Rais Yasin | BN (UMNO) |
| N12 | Pantai Kundor | Tuminah Kadi @ Mohd Hasim | BN (UMNO) |
| N13 | Paya Rumput | Rafie Ahmad | PN (PAS) |
| N14 | Kelebang | Lim Ban Hong | BN (MCA) |

=== Local governments & postcodes ===
| No. | State Constituency | Local Government | Postcode |
|---|---|---|---|
| N11 | Sungai Udang | Malacca City Council | 75200, 75250, 75260, 76450 Melaka; 76100 Durian Tunggal; 76200 Kem Terendak; 76300 Sungai Udang; 76400 Tanjong Kling |
| N12 | Pantai Kundor | Malacca City Council | 75200, 75250, 75260, 76450 Melaka; 76100 Durian Tunggal; 76200 Kem Terendak; 76300 Sungai Udang; 76400 Tanjong Kling |
| N13 | Paya Rumput | Malacca City Council | 75200, 75250, 75260, 76450 Melaka; 76100 Durian Tunggal; 76200 Kem Terendak; 76300 Sungai Udang; 76400 Tanjong Kling |
| N14 | Kelebang | Malacca City Council | 75200, 75250, 75260, 76450 Melaka; 76100 Durian Tunggal; 76200 Kem Terendak; 76300 Sungai Udang; 76400 Tanjong Kling |

== Election results ==
Malaysian general election, 2022: Tangga Batu
| Party | Candidate | Votes | % | ∆% |
|---|---|---|---|---|
| PN | Bakri Jamaluddin | 37,406 | 40.65 | ▲40.65 |
| PH | Rusnah Aluai | 28,557 | 31.03 | ▲31.03 |
| BN | Lim Ban Hong | 25,095 | 27.27 | ▼12.88 |
| PEJUANG | Ghazali Abu | 702 | 0.76 | ▲0.76 |
| Independent | Shahril Mahmood | 267 | 0.29 | ▲0.29 |
| Total valid votes | | 92,027 | 100.00 | |
| Total rejected ballots | | 719 | | |
| Unreturned ballots | | 270 | | |
| Turnout | | 93,016 | 80.19 | ▼4.48 |
| Registered electors | | 115,998 | | |
| Majority | | 8,849 | 9.62 | ▲2.88 |
| PN gain from PKR | | Swing | | ? |
Source(s) https://lom.agc.gov.my/ilims/upload/portal/akta/outputp/1753258/PUB%20616%20PARLIMEN%20MELAKA.pdf

Malaysian general election, 2018: Tangga Batu
| Party | Candidate | Votes | % | ∆% |
|---|---|---|---|---|
| PKR | Rusnah Aluai | 32,420 | 46.89 | ▲9.24 |
| BN | Zali Mat Yasin | 27,761 | 40.15 | ▼22.20 |
| PAS | Zulkifli Ismail | 8,961 | 12.96 | ▲12.96 |
| Total valid votes | | 69,142 | 100.00 | |
| Total rejected ballots | | 1,145 | | |
| Unreturned ballots | | 166 | | |
| Turnout | | 70,453 | 84.67 | ▼3.25 |
| Registered electors | | 83,213 | | |
| Majority | | 4,659 | 6.74 | ▼17.96 |
| PKR gain from BN | | Swing | | ? |
Source(s) "His Majesty's Government Gazette - Notice of Contested Election, Parliament for the State of Malacca [P.U. (B) 243/2018]" (PDF). Attorney General's Chambers of Malaysia. 3 May 2018. "Federal Government Gazette - Results of Contested Election and Statements of the Poll after the Official Addition of Votes, Parliamentary Constituencies for the State of Malacca [P.U. (B) 317/2018]" (PDF). Attorney General's Chambers of Malaysia. 28 May 2018. Archived from the original (PDF) on 2019-12-29.

Malaysian general election, 2013: Tangga Batu
| Party | Candidate | Votes | % | ∆% |
|---|---|---|---|---|
| BN | Abu Bakar Mohamad Diah | 39,468 | 62.35 | ▼3.27 |
| PKR | Rahim Ali | 23,835 | 37.65 | ▲3.27 |
| Total valid votes | | 63,303 | 100.00 | |
| Total rejected ballots | | 985 | | |
| Unreturned ballots | | 138 | | |
| Turnout | | 64,426 | 87.92 | ▲5.39 |
| Registered electors | | 73,282 | | |
| Majority | | 15,633 | 24.70 | ▼6.54 |
| BN hold | | Swing | | |
Source(s) "Federal Government Gazette - Notice of Contested Election, Parliament for the State of Malacca [P.U. (B) 180/2013]" (PDF). Attorney General's Chambers of Malaysia. 26 April 2013. "Federal Government Gazette - Results of Contested Election and Statements of the Poll after the Official Addition of Votes, Parliamentary Constituencies for the State of Malacca [P.U. (B) 221/2013]" (PDF). Attorney General's Chambers of Malaysia. 22 May 2013.

Malaysian general election, 2008: Tangga Batu
| Party | Candidate | Votes | % | ∆% |
|---|---|---|---|---|
| BN | Idris Haron | 30,460 | 65.62 | ▼13.74 |
| PKR | Zainon Jaafar | 15,960 | 34.38 | ▲13.74 |
| Total valid votes | | 46,420 | 100.00 | |
| Total rejected ballots | | 1,283 | | |
| Unreturned ballots | | 1,972 | | |
| Turnout | | 49,675 | 82.53 | ▼1.91 |
| Registered electors | | 60,188 | | |
| Majority | | 14,500 | 31.24 | ▼27.48 |
| BN hold | | Swing | | |

Malaysian general election, 2004: Tangga Batu
| Party | Candidate | Votes | % |
|---|---|---|---|
| BN | Idris Haron | 33,039 | 79.36 |
| PKR | Shamsul Iskandar @ Yusre Mohd Akin | 8,595 | 20.64 |
| Total valid votes | | 41,634 | 100.00 |
| Total rejected ballots | | 1,321 | |
| Unreturned ballots | | 10 | |
| Turnout | | 42,965 | 80.62 |
| Registered electors | | 53,293 | |
| Majority | | 24,444 | 58.72 |
This was a new constituency created.
