= Norpipah Abdol =

Malaysian politician (1954–2022)

Yang Berbahagia Datuk Wira Hajjah Norpipah Abdol DCSM DMSM DSM BCM PPN
- نورڤيڤية عبدول

Member of the Malacca State Executive Council
- 2008–2013: Chairwoman of the Women, Family Development and Welfare
- 2013–2018: Deputy Chairwoman of the Youth and Heritage Development

Member of the Malacca State Legislative Assembly for Rembia
- In office 8 March 2008 – 9 May 2018
- Preceded by: Abdul Wahab Abdul Latip (BN–UMNO)
- Succeeded by: Muhammad Jailani Khamis (PH–PKR)
- Majority: 2,842 (2008); 2,358 (2013)

Faction represented in Malacca State Legislative Assembly
- 2008–2018: Barisan Nasional

Personal details
- Born: 27 July 1954 Malacca, Federation of Malaya (now Malaysia)
- Died: 15 March 2022 (aged 67) National Cancer Institute, Putrajaya
- Cause of death: COVID-19 complications and cancer
- Resting place: Kampung Pengkalan Muslim Cemetery, Alor Gajah, Malacca
- Citizenship: Malaysian
- Party: United Malays National Organisation (UMNO)
- Other political affiliations: Barisan Nasional (BN); Muafakat Nasional (MN)
- Occupation: Politician
- Norpipah Abdol on Facebook

Norpipah binti Abdol (27 July 1954 – 15 March 2022) was a Malaysian politician.

== Biography ==
Norpipah served as a Member of the Malacca State Executive Council (EXCO) from March 2008 to May 2013 and as a Deputy EXCO Member from May 2013 to May 2018. She was the Member of the Malacca State Legislative Assembly (MLA) for Rembia from March 2008 until her defeat in May 2018. She was a member of the United Malays National Organisation (UMNO), a component party of the Barisan Nasional (BN) coalition and was also the Alor Gajah UMNO Woman's Chief.

On 15 March 2022, she died of cancer and tested positive for COVID-19 amid the COVID-19 pandemic in Malaysia.

== Election results ==
Malacca State Legislative Assembly
Year	Constituency	Candidate	Votes	Pct	Opponent(s)	Votes	Pct	Ballots cast	Majority	Turnout
2008	N06 Rembia	Norpipah Abdol (UMNO)	5,605	66.98%	Md Yusof Abdullah (PKR)	2,763	33.02%	8,613	2,842	78.69%
2013	N06 Rembia	Norpipah Abdol (UMNO)	6,879	60.34%	Rusnah Aluai (PKR)	4,521	39.66%	11,617	2,358	86.80%
2018	N06 Rembia	Norpipah Abdol (UMNO)	4,959	38.35%	Muhammad Jailani Khamis (PKR)	6,773	52.37%	13,175	1,814	84.26%
2018	N06 Rembia	Norpipah Abdol (UMNO)	4,959	38.35%	Mohammad Rashidi Abd Razak (PAS)	1,200	9.28%	13,175	1,814	84.26%

== Honours ==
- Malaysia
  - Medal of the Order of the Defender of the Realm (PPN) (2004)
- Malacca
  - Knight Commander of the Exalted Order of Malacca (DCSM) – Datuk Wira (2016)
  - Companion Class I of the Exalted Order of Malacca (DMSM) – Datuk (2009)
  - Member of the Exalted Order of Malacca (DSM) (2006)
  - Recipient of the Distinguished Service Star (BCM) (2002)
