= Rusnah Aluai =

Malaysian politician

Member of the Malaysian Parliament for Tangga Batu
- In office 9 May 2018 – 19 November 2022
- Preceded by: Abu Bakar Mohamad Diah (BN–UMNO)
- Succeeded by: Bakri Jamaluddin (PN–PAS)
- Majority: 4,659 (2018)

Faction represented in Dewan Rakyat
- 2018–2022: Pakatan Harapan

Personal details
- Born: Rusnah binti Aluai; 20 February 1962 (age 64) Malacca, Malaysia
- Citizenship: Malaysian
- Party: People's Justice Party (PKR)
- Other political affiliations: Pakatan Harapan (PH)
- Spouse: Rahmat Abd Rahman
- Education: Universiti Islam Malaysia & London's School of Economics and Political Science (Law)
- Occupation: Politician

Rusnah binti Aluai (born 20 February 1962) is a Malaysian politician who served as a Member of Parliament for Tangga Batu.

== Political career ==
In the 2013 election, Rusnah represented the People's Justice Party (PKR) and faced Norpipah Abdol of the Barisan Nasional Party for the Rembia state seat. She lost with a majority vote of 2,358.

In the 2018 election, she represented the PKR party and won the Tangga Batu parliamentary seat, defeating Barisan Nasional candidate Zali Mat Yasin and giving BN its first defeat for a parliamentary seat in the seat since independence.

== Election results ==
Malacca State Legislative Assembly
Year	Constituency	Candidate	Votes	Pct	Opponent(s)	Votes	Pct	Ballots cast	Majority	Turnout
2013	N06 Rembia	Rusnah Aluai (PKR)	4,521	39.66%	Norpipah Abdol (UMNO)	6,879	60.34%	11,617	2,358	86.62%

Parliament of Malaysia
Year	Constituency	Candidate	Votes	Pct	Opponent(s)	Votes	Pct	Ballots cast	Majority	Turnout
2018	P136 Tangga Batu	Rusnah Aluai (PKR)	32,420	46.89%	Zali Mat Yasin (UMNO)	27,761	40.15%	70,453	4,659	84.67%
2018	P136 Tangga Batu	Rusnah Aluai (PKR)	32,420	46.89%	Zulkifli Ismail (PAS)	8,961	12.96%	70,453	4,659	84.67%
2022	P136 Tangga Batu	Rusnah Aluai (PKR)	28,557	31.03%	Bakri Jamaluddin (PAS)	37,406	40.65%	92,027	8,849	80.19%
2022	P136 Tangga Batu	Rusnah Aluai (PKR)	28,557	31.03%	Lim Ban Hong (MCA)	25,095	27.27%	92,027	8,849	80.19%
2022	P136 Tangga Batu	Rusnah Aluai (PKR)	28,557	31.03%	Ghazali Abu (PUTRA)	702	0.26%	92,027	8,849	80.19%
2022	P136 Tangga Batu	Rusnah Aluai (PKR)	28,557	31.03%	Shahril Mahmood (IND)	267	0.29%	92,027	8,849	80.19%
