= Liou Chen Kuang =

Malaysian politician and businessman

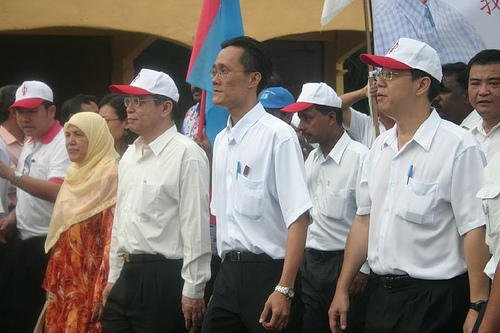
- Liou Chen Kuang (centre, foreground without cap) contested and lost the 2007 Machap by-election

Personal details
- Party: Democratic Action Party

Chinese name
- Chinese: 廖政光
- Hanyu Pinyin: Liào Zhèngguāng

Liou Chen Kuang is a Malaysian politician and businessman of Chinese descent from Machap Baru in Malacca state. He is a member of the Democratic Action Party (DAP) and was the party's losing candidate for the Malacca State Legislative Assembly seat of Machap in the 2004 general elections. In the 2004 election, the late Datuk Wira Poh Ah Tiam of the Barisan Nasional (BN) defeated him by a majority of 4,562 votes.

Despite the loss, on 30 March 2007, the DAP announced Liou will again contest for the party in the 2007 Machap by-election due to his "knowledge of the local terrain", grassroots support, and his willingness "to serve Machap constituents". Liou was eventually defeated, but by a marginally smaller majority.

== Election results ==
Malacca State Legislative Assembly
| Year | Constituency | Candidate | Votes | Pct | Opponent(s) | Votes | Pct | Ballots cast | Majority | Turnout |
|---|---|---|---|---|---|---|---|---|---|---|
| 2004 | N08 Machap | Liou Chen Kuang (DAP) | 1,285 | 17.48% | Poh Ah Tiam (MCA) | 5,847 | 79.55% | 7,350 | 4,562 | 74.33% |
| 2007 | N08 Machap | Liou Chen Kuang (DAP) | 1,452 | 20.79% | Lai Meng Chong (MCA) | 5,533 | 79.21% | 7,151 | 4,081 | 74.31% |
| 2013 | N14 Kelebang | Liou Chen Kuang (DAP) | 7,074 | 43.55% | Lim Ban Hong (MCA) | 9,171 | 56.45% | 16,629 | 2,097 | 87.16% |
