= Rais Yasin =

Malaysian politician

Yang Berhormat Datuk Rais Yasin DPSM MLA
- رئيس يس

Senior Member of the Malacca State Executive Council
- In office 5 April 2023 – 14 November 2026
- Governor: Mohd Ali Rustam
- Deputy: Zulkiflee Mohd Zin
- Chief Minister: Ab Rauf Yusoh
- Portfolio: Housing, Local Government, Drainage, Climate Change and Disaster Management
- Preceded by: Zaidi Attan (Member, Housing and Local Government); Portfolios established (Drainage, Climate Change and Disaster Management)
- Constituency: Paya Rumput

Member of the Malacca State Executive Council
- In office 26 November 2021 – 31 March 2023
- Governor: Mohd Ali Rustam
- Chief Minister: Sulaiman Md Ali
- Portfolio: Education, Science, Technology and Innovation
- Preceded by: Noor Effandi Ahmad
- Succeeded by: Rahmad Mariman (Education); Fairul Nizam Roslan (Science, Technology and Innovation)
- Constituency: Paya Rumput

State Deputy Chairman of the United Malays National Organisation of Malacca
- Incumbent
- Assumed office 22 March 2023
- President: Ahmad Zahid Hamidi
- State Chairman: Ab Rauf Yusoh
- Preceded by: Mohamad Ali Mohamad

Division Chief of the United Malays National Organisation of Tangga Batu
- Incumbent
- Assumed office 18 March 2023
- President: Ahmad Zahid Hamidi
- Deputy: Shahrin Muharam
- Preceded by: Mohamad Ali Mohamad

Member of the Malacca State Legislative Assembly for Sungai Udang
- Incumbent
- Assumed office 14 November 2026
- Preceded by: Mohd Aleef Yusof (PN–BERSATU)
- Majority: 16,214 (2026)

Member of the Malacca State Legislative Assembly for Paya Rumput
- In office 20 November 2021 – 14 November 2026
- Preceded by: Mohd Rafiq Naizamohideen (PH–BERSATU)
- Succeeded by: Rafie Ahmad
- Majority: 629 (2021)

Faction represented in Malacca State Legislative Assembly
- 2021–: Barisan Nasional

Personal details
- Born: 7 September 1984 (age 42) Malacca, Malaysia
- Citizenship: Malaysian
- Party: United Malays National Organisation (UMNO)
- Other political affiliations: Barisan Nasional (BN)
- Spouse: Erni Aidilia Karim
- Parent: Yasin Mohd Sarif
- Education: Al-Azhar University
- Occupation: Politician

Rais bin Yasin (born 7 September 1984) is a Malaysian politician who has served as Senior Member of the Malacca State Executive Council (EXCO) in the Barisan Nasional (BN) state administration under Chief Minister Ab Rauf Yusoh since April 2023 and Member of the Malacca State Legislative Assembly (MLA) for Paya Rumput since November 2021 until November 2026 and Sungai Udang since November 2026. He served as Member of the Malacca State EXCO under former Chief Minister Sulaiman Md Ali from November 2021 to March 2023. He is a member of the United Malays National Organisation (UMNO), a component party of the BN coalition. He has also served as the State Deputy Chairman of UMNO of Malacca and Division Chief of UMNO of Tangga Batu since March 2023.

== Election results ==
Malacca State Legislative Assembly
Year	Constituency	Candidate	Votes	Pct	Opponent(s)	Votes	Pct	Ballots cast	Majority	Turnout
2021	N13 Paya Rumput	Rais Yasin (UMNO)	6,830	39.68%	Shamsul Iskandar Mohd Akin (PKR)	6,201	36.03%	17,211	629	65.06%
2021	N13 Paya Rumput	Rais Yasin (UMNO)	6,830	39.68%	Muhammad Fariz Izwan Mazlan (BERSATU)	3,972	23.08%	17,211	629	65.06%
2021	N13 Paya Rumput	Rais Yasin (UMNO)	6,830	39.68%	Mohd Jaini Dimon (IND)	127	0.74%	17,211	629	65.06%
2021	N13 Paya Rumput	Rais Yasin (UMNO)	6,830	39.68%	Muhammad Hashidi Mohd Zin (PUTRA)	81	0.47%	17,211	629	65.06%
2026	N11 Sungai Udang	Rais Yasin (UMNO)	18,317	84.25%	Mohd Ridzuan Abdul Rahman (BERSAMA)	2,103	9.67%	21,742	16,214	74.75%
2026	N11 Sungai Udang	Rais Yasin (UMNO)	18,317	84.25%	Abdullah Mahadi (BERSATU)	1,322	6.08%	21,742	16,214	74.75%

== Honours ==
- Malacca
  - Lieutenant of the Exalted Order of Malacca (DPSM) – Datuk (2020)
