= Abdul Ghafar Atan =

Malaysian politician (1956–2021)

Yang Berbahagia Datuk Seri Haji Abdul Ghafar Atan DGSM DCSM DMSM DSM KMN BCM PJK
- عبدالغفار بن أتن

Exco roles (Malacca)
- 2008–2011: Chairman of the Housing, Small Town Development and Project Restoration
- 2011–2013: Chairman of the Industry, Trade, Entrepreneur Development and Co-operatives
- 2013–2014: Chairman of the Public Works, Public Facilities, Transport and Project Restoration
- 2014–2018: Chairman of the Public Works and Public Facilities
- 2020–2021: Chairman of the Housing, Local Government and Environment

Faction represented in Malacca State Legislative Assembly
- 2004–2021: Barisan Nasional

Personal details
- Born: 13 July 1956 Malacca, Federation of Malaya (now Malaysia)
- Died: 17 November 2021 (aged 65) Malacca City, Malaysia
- Cause of death: COVID-19 complications
- Resting place: Kampung Asahan Muslim Cemetery
- Citizenship: Malaysian
- Party: United Malays National Organisation (UMNO)
- Other political affiliations: Barisan Nasional (BN); Perikatan Nasional (PN); Muafakat Nasional (MN)
- Spouse: Rabiah Hassan
- Children: 3
- Occupation: Politician
- Abdul Ghafar Atan on Facebook

Abdul Ghafar bin Atan (Jawi: عبدالغفار بن أتن; 13 July 1956 – 17 November 2021) was a Malaysian politician.

He served as Member of the Melaka State Executive Council (EXCO) from March 2008 to May 2018 and again from March 2020 to his death in November 2021, as well as Member of the Melaka State Legislative Assembly (MLA) for Asahan from May 2013 to his death in November 2021 and Gadek from March 2004 to May 2013. He was a member of the United Malays National Organisation (UMNO), a component party of the Barisan Nasional (BN) coalition and also the Alor Gajah UMNO chief.

== Politics ==
Abdul Ghafar first contested as a BN candidate in the 11th general election in the Gadek state constituency in 2004 and went on to defend the seat in the 12th general election in 2008. In the 13th general election in 2013, he contested the Asahan seat and defended it in the 14th general election (GE14) in 2018.

== Death ==
On 4 November 2021, it was announced Abdul Ghafar would not be picked by UMNO as the BN candidate on nomination day on 8 November to give way to younger face to defend the Asahan seat, considered the hottest constituency in the Malacca state election on 20 November.

After being dropped as the election candidate, he was screened and tested positive for COVID-19 at a private hospital on 7 November and when his health deteriorated into critical condition later, he was put under an induced coma in the intensive care unit of Malacca General Hospital on the night of 9 November. Abdul Ghafar subsequently died from the complications at age 65 in the hospital at 1.04pm on 17 November leaving behind his wife, Rabiah Hassan. He was buried according to the COVID-19 pandemic standard operating procedure (SOP) at the Kampung Asahan Muslim Cemetery in Malacca.

== Election results ==
Malacca State Legislative Assembly
Year	Constituency	Candidate	Votes	Pct	Opponent(s)	Votes	Pct	Ballots cast	Majority	Turnout
2004	N07 Gadek	Abdul Ghafar Atan (UMNO)	5,871	77.99%	Yahaya Ja'alam (PAS)	1,185	15.74%	7,755	4,686	71.84%
2004	N07 Gadek	Abdul Ghafar Atan (UMNO)	5,871	77.99%	Sibapatham Sionavar (PKR)	472	6.27%	7,755	4,686	71.84%
2008	N07 Gadek	Abdul Ghafar Atan (UMNO)	5,326	69.75%	S. Kanageswari (PKR)	2,310	30.25%	7,878	3,016	73.29%
2013	N09 Asahan	Abdul Ghafar Atan (UMNO)	8,257	65.24%	Wong Chee Chew (PAS)	4,400	34.76%	12,898	3,857	86.30%
2018	N09 Asahan	Abdul Ghafar Atan (UMNO)	5,942	45.80%	Zamzuri Arifin (BERSATU)	5,667	43.68%	13,239	275	82.69%
2018	N09 Asahan	Abdul Ghafar Atan (UMNO)	5,942	45.80%	Azlan Maddin (PAS)	1,365	10.52%	13,239	275	82.69%

== Honours ==
=== Honours of Malaysia ===
- Malaysia
  - Officer of the Order of the Defender of the Realm (KMN) (2006)
- Malacca
  - Grand Commander of the Exalted Order of Malacca (DGSM) – Datuk Seri (2016)
  - Knight Commander of the Exalted Order of Malacca (DCSM) – Datuk Wira (2011)
  - Companion Class I of the Exalted Order of Malacca (DMSM) – Datuk (2004)
  - Member of the Exalted Order of Malacca (DSM) (2001)
  - Recipient of the Distinguished Service Star (BCM)
  - Recipient of the Meritorious Service Medal (PJK)

== See also ==
- List of deaths due to COVID-19 - notable individual deaths
