= Order of precedence in Malacca =

Relative preeminence of officials for ceremonial purposes

The Malacca order of precedence is a nominal and symbolic hierarchy of important positions within the state of Malacca. It has no legal standing but is used to dictate ceremonial protocol at events of a state nature. It was implanted since Malay ruling in the State. The Portuguese influence is also notable. The order is led by the Yang di-Pertua Negeri of Malacca as the head of state, followed by state dignitaries, high-ranking officials, and award recipients. The hierarchy places the Chief Minister of Malacca and state executive council members in prominent positions.

== See also ==
- List of post-nominal letters (Malacca)
