= Lim Ban Hong =

Malaysian politician

Yang Berhormat Datuk Wira Lim Ban Hong DCSM DMSM BKT MLA
- 林萬鋒
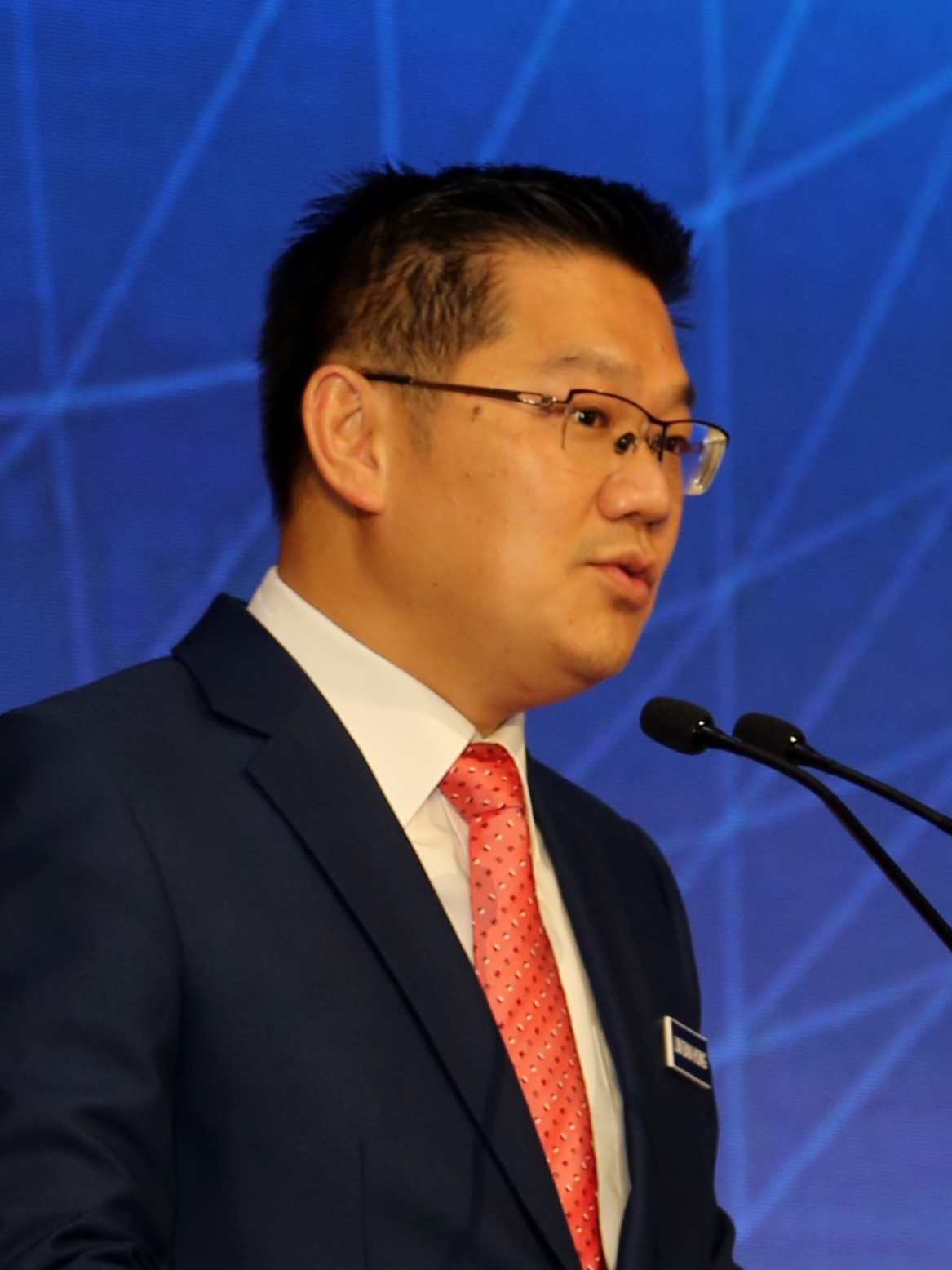

Deputy Minister of International Trade and Industry
- In office 30 August 2021 – 24 November 2022
- Monarch: Abdullah
- Prime Minister: Ismail Sabri Yaakob
- Minister: Azmin Ali
- Preceded by: Himself
- Succeeded by: Liew Chin Tong
- Constituency: Senator
- In office 10 March 2020 – 16 August 2021
- Monarch: Abdullah
- Prime Minister: Muhyiddin Yassin
- Minister: Azmin Ali
- Preceded by: Ong Kian Ming
- Succeeded by: Himself
- Constituency: Senator

Senator Appointed by the Yang di-Pertuan Agong
- In office 10 March 2020 – 5 November 2022
- Monarch: Abdullah
- Prime Minister: Muhyiddin Yassin (2020–2021); Ismail Sabri Yaakob (2021–2022)

Member of the Malacca State Executive Council (Transport, Project Rehabilitation and International Trade)
- In office 1 July 2014 – 11 May 2018
- Governor: Mohd Khalil Yaakob
- Chief Minister: Idris Haron
- Constituency: Kelebang

Member of the Malacca State Legislative Assembly for Kelebang
- Incumbent
- Assumed office 20 November 2021
- Preceded by: Gue Teck (PH–PKR)
- Majority: 876 (2021); 7,035 (2026)
- In office 5 May 2013 – 9 May 2018
- Preceded by: Seet Har Cheow (BN–MCA)
- Succeeded by: Gue Teck (PH–PKR)
- Majority: 2,097 (2013)

Vice President of the Malaysian Chinese Association
- Incumbent
- Assumed office 4 November 2018 Serving with Tan Teik Cheng & Ti Lian Ker (2018–2023) & Yew Teong Look (2018–2023) & Wee Jeck Seng (since 2023) & Lawrance Low Ah Keong (since 2023)
- President: Wee Ka Siong
- Preceded by: Lee Chee Leong

Faction represented in Dewan Negara
- 2020–2022: Barisan Nasional

Faction represented in Malacca State Legislative Assembly
- 2013–2018, 2021–: Barisan Nasional

Personal details
- Born: 22 March 1977 (age 49) Malacca, Malaysia
- Citizenship: Malaysian
- Party: Malaysian Chinese Association (MCA)
- Other political affiliations: Barisan Nasional (BN)
- Education: University of London
- Occupation: Politician
- Lim Ban Hong on Facebook

Lim Ban Hong (simplified Chinese: 林万锋; traditional Chinese: 林萬鋒; Pe̍h-ōe-jī: Lîm Bān-hong; born 22 March 1977) is a Malaysian politician who has served as Member of the Malacca State Legislative Assembly (MLA) for Kelebang from May 2013 to May 2018 and again since November 2021. He served as the Deputy Minister of International Trade and Industry in the Barisan Nasional (BN) administration under former Prime Minister Ismail Sabri Yaakob and former Minister Azmin Ali from August 2021 to the collapse of the BN administration in November 2022 and the first term in the Perikatan Nasional (PN) administration under former Prime Minister Muhyiddin Yassin and former Minister Azmin from March 2020 to the collapse of the PN administration in August 2021, Senator from March 2020 to his resignation in November 2022 as well as Member of the Malacca State Executive Council (EXCO) in BN state administration under former Chief Minister Idris Haron from July 2014 to the collapse of the BN state administration in May 2018. He is a member and State Chairman of Malacca of the Malaysian Chinese Association (MCA), a component party of the BN coalition. He has also served as a Vice President of MCA since November 2018.

== Politics ==
Lim first won in 2013 state election to serve as Member of the Malacca State Legislative Assembly (MLA) for Kelebang from May 2013 to May 2018. He had also served as member of the Malacca State Executive Council (EXCO) for the Transport, Project Rehabilitation and International Trade Executive Committee of the state.

He, however, was defeated by Pakatan Harapan (PH) candidate Gue Teck and failed to defend his position as the MLA for Kelebang in the 2018 state election which also saw the collapse of the BN administration in the simultaneous 2013 general election (GE14). After the earlier GE14 outcome, in the November 2018 party leadership election, Lim was elected as the Vice-President of MCA in the new leadership line-up.

Following the collapse of PH in the February 2020 Malaysian political crisis also dubbed as 'Sheraton Move', which led to the appointment of the new Prime Minister Muhyiddin Yassin and formation of the new PN administration in March the same year, as BN-MCA is an allied partner, he was picked as the Deputy Minister of International Trade and Industry and Senator by Muhyiddin for him to be appointed as a deputy minister. He was sworn-in and appointed by Yang di-Pertuan Agong, Al-Sultan Abdullah.

In November 2021 state election, he get to be re-elected again after regaining the Kelebang seat back by defeating the incumbent Gue Teck.

== Election results ==
Malacca State Legislative Assembly
Year	Constituency	Candidate	Votes	Pct	Opponent(s)	Votes	Pct	Ballots cast	Majority	Turnout
2013	N14 Kelebang	Lim Ban Hong (MCA)	9,171	56.45%	Liou Chen Kuang (DAP)	7,074	43.55%	16,629	2,097	87.16%
2018	N14 Kelebang	Lim Ban Hong (MCA)	6,859	40.88%	Gue Teck (PKR)	7,648	45.58%	17,059	789	84.59%
2018	N14 Kelebang	Lim Ban Hong (MCA)	6,859	40.88%	Mohd Syafiq Ismail (PAS)	2,272	13.54%	17,059	789	84.59%
2021	N14 Kelebang	Lim Ban Hong (MCA)	5,028	38.49%	Gue Teck (PKR)	4,152	31.78%	13,064	876	66.31%
2021	N14 Kelebang	Lim Ban Hong (MCA)	5,028	38.49%	Bakri Jamaluddin (PAS)	3,884	29.73%	13,064	876	66.31%
2026	N14 Kelebang	Lim Ban Hong (MCA)	12,522	63.57%	Farzana Hayani Mohd Nasir (PKR)	5,487	27.86%	19,698	7,035	72.88%
2026	N14 Kelebang	Lim Ban Hong (MCA)	12,522	63.57%	Mohamad Ali Mohamad (BERSATU)	940	4.77%	19,698	7,035	72.88%
2026	N14 Kelebang	Lim Ban Hong (MCA)	12,522	63.57%	Young Jie Yu (BERSAMA)	749	3.80%	19,698	7,035	72.88%

Parliament of Malaysia
Year	Constituency	Candidate	Votes	Pct	Opponent(s)	Votes	Pct	Ballots cast	Majority	Turnout
2022	P136 Tangga Batu	Lim Ban Hong (MCA)	25,095	27.27%	Bakri Jamaluddin (PAS)	37,406	40.65%	92,027	8,849	80.19%
2022	P136 Tangga Batu	Lim Ban Hong (MCA)	25,095	27.27%	Rusnah Aluai (PKR)	28,557	31.03%	92,027	8,849	80.19%
2022	P136 Tangga Batu	Lim Ban Hong (MCA)	25,095	27.27%	Ghazali Abu (PUTRA)	702	0.76%	92,027	8,849	80.19%
2022	P136 Tangga Batu	Lim Ban Hong (MCA)	25,095	27.27%	Shahril Mahmood (IND)	267	0.29%	92,027	8,849	80.19%

== Honours ==
=== Honours of Malaysia ===
- Malacca
  - Commander of the Exalted Order of Malacca (DCSM) – Datuk Wira (2024)
  - Companion of the Exalted Order of Malacca (DMSM) – Datuk (2014)
  - Recipient of the Commendable Service Star (BKT)
