= Asahan (state constituency) =

State constituency in Malacca, Malaysia

Asahan (N10)
Malacca constituency

State constituency
- Legislature: Malacca State Legislative Assembly
MLA
Fairul Nizam Roslan
BN
- Constituency created: 2003
- First contested: 2004
- Last contested: 2026

Demographics
- Electors (2026): 20,217
- Area (km²): 214

N10 Asahan within Malacca, as used for the 2021 state election

Asahan is a state constituency in Malacca, Malaysia, that has been represented in the Malacca State Legislative Assembly.

The state constituency was first contested in 2003 and is mandated to return a single Assemblyman to the Malacca State Legislative Assembly under the first-past-the-post voting system.

== Definition ==
The Asahan constituency contains the polling districts of Simpang Tebong, Pekan Selandar, Bukit Sedanan, Batang Melaka, Jus, Bukit Senggeh, Pekan Nyalas, FELDA Bukit Senggeh, Pondok Batang, Ladang Bukit Asahan and Pekan Asahan.

== Demographics ==
Ethnic breakdown of Asahan's electorate as of 2026
1. Malays (64.9%)
2. Chinese (20.7%)
3. Indians (11.4%)
4. Other Ethnicities (2.80%)

== History ==
=== Polling districts ===
According to the gazette issued on 5 November 2026, the Asahan constituency has a total of 11 polling districts.

State constituency	Polling districts	Code	Location
Asahan (N10)	Simpang Tebong	135/10/01	SJK (C) On Lok
Asahan (N10)	Pekan Selandar	135/10/02	SJK (C) Chiao Chee
Asahan (N10)	Bukit Sedanan	135/10/03	SK Seri Machap
Asahan (N10)	Batang Melaka	135/10/04	SK Batang Melaka
Asahan (N10)	Jus	135/10/05	SK Jus
Asahan (N10)	Bukit Senggeh	135/10/06	SK Bukit Senggeh
Asahan (N10)	Pekan Nyalas	135/10/07	SK Nyalas
Asahan (N10)	FELDA Bukit Senggeh	135/10/08	SK (FELDA) Bukit Senggeh
Asahan (N10)	Pondok Batang	135/10/09	SK Masjid Baru
Asahan (N10)	Ladang Bukit Asahan	135/10/10	SJK (T) Ladang Bukit Asahan
Asahan (N10)	Pekan Asahan	135/10/11	SK Asahan

=== Representation history ===
Members of the Legislative Assembly for Asahan
Assembly	No	Years	Member	Party
Constituency created from Bukit Asahan
11th	N10	2004–2008	Raghavan Raman	BN (MIC)
12th	N10	2008–2013	R. Perumal	BN (MIC)
13th	N10	2013–2018	Abdul Ghafar Atan	BN (UMNO)
14th	N10	2018–2021	Abdul Ghafar Atan	BN (UMNO)
15th	N10	2021–2026	Fairul Nizam Roslan	BN (UMNO)
16th	N10	2026 – present	Fairul Nizam Roslan	BN (UMNO)

== Election results ==
Malacca state election, 2026
Party	Candidate	Votes	%	∆%
BN	Fairul Nizam Roslan	11,731	82.01	▲16.24
PH	Denesh Palasubraniam	2,573	17.99	▼13.00
Total valid votes		14,304		
Total rejected ballots		151		
Unreturned ballots		12		
Turnout		14,467	71.56	▲6.38
Registered electors		20,217		
Majority		9,158	64.02	▲29.24
BN hold		Swing		
Source(s) https://electiondata.my/elections/mlk/SE-16/

Malacca state election, 2021
Party	Candidate	Votes	%	∆%
BN	Fairul Nizam Roslan	5,659	65.77	▲19.97
PH	Idris Haron	2,666	30.99	▲30.99
PN	Dhanesh Basil	1,364	15.83	▲15.83
Independent	Mohd Akhir Ayob	136	1.58	▲1.58
Independent	Azmar Ab Hamid	99	1.15	▲1.15
Independent	Mohd Noor Salleh	44	0.51	▲0.51
Total valid votes		8,604		
Total rejected ballots		262		
Unreturned ballots		33		
Turnout		10,263	65.18	▼17.51
Registered electors		15,745		
Majority		2,993	34.78	▲32.66
BN hold		Swing		
Source(s) https://lom.agc.gov.my/ilims/upload/portal/akta/outputp/1715764/PUB%20583.pdf

Malacca state election, 2018
Party	Candidate	Votes	%	∆%
BN	Abdul Ghafar Atan	5,942	45.80	▼19.44
PKR	Zamzuri Arifin	5,667	43.68	▲43.68
PAS	Azlan Maddin	1,365	10.52	▼24.24
Total valid votes		12,974	100.00	
Total rejected ballots		218		
Unreturned ballots		47		
Turnout		13,239	82.69	▼3.61
Registered electors		16,011		
Majority		275	2.12	▼28.36
BN hold		Swing		

Malacca state election, 2013
Party	Candidate	Votes	%	∆%
BN	Abdul Ghafar Atan	8,257	65.24	▲4.04
PAS	Wong Chee Chew	4,400	34.76	▼4.04
Total valid votes		12,657	100.00	
Total rejected ballots		241		
Unreturned ballots		0		
Turnout		12,898	86.30	▲9.81
Registered electors		14,945		
Majority		3,857	30.48	▲8.08
BN hold		Swing		
Source(s) "Federal Government Gazette - Notice of Contested Election, State Legislative Assembly for the State of Selangor [P.U. (B) 192/2013]" (PDF). Attorney General's Chambers of Malaysia. 26 April 2013. Archived from the original (PDF) on 29 December 2019. "Federal Government Gazette - Results of Contested Election and Statements of the Poll after the Official Addition of Votes, State Constituencies for the State of Selangor [P.U. (B) 233/2013]" (PDF). Attorney General's Chambers of Malaysia. 22 May 2013. Archived from the original (PDF) on 2 October 2018.

Malacca state election, 2008
Party	Candidate	Votes	%	∆%
BN	R. Perumal	5,950	61.20	▼12.63
PAS	Amdan Sudin	3,772	38.80	▲12.63
Total valid votes		9,722	100.00	
Total rejected ballots		301		
Unreturned ballots		16		
Turnout		10,039	76.49	▲0.83
Registered electors		13,125		
Majority		2,178	22.40	▼25.26
BN hold		Swing		

Malacca state election, 2004
Party	Candidate	Votes	%
BN	Raghavan Raman	6,901	73.83
PKR	Azmi Kamir	2,446	26.17
Total valid votes		9,347	100.00
Total rejected ballots		236	
Unreturned ballots		0	
Turnout		9,583	75.66
Registered electors		12,666	
Majority		4,455	47.66
This was a new constituency created.
