= Gue Teck =

Malaysian politician

Yang Berbahagia Datuk Gue Teck DPSM
- 魏世德

Member of the Malacca State Legislative Assembly for Kelebang
- In office 9 May 2018 – 20 November 2021
- Preceded by: Lim Ban Hong (BN–MCA)
- Succeeded by: Lim Ban Hong (BN–MCA)
- Majority: 789 (2018)

Personal details
- Born: Gue Teck; 3 July 1959 (age 67) Malacca, Federation of Malaya (now Malaysia)
- Citizenship: Malaysia
- Party: People's Justice Party (PKR) (until 2026); Malaysian United Party (BERSAMA) (since 2026)
- Other political affiliations: Pakatan Harapan (PH) (until 2026)
- Spouse: Ong Yew Fung
- Occupation: Politician

Gue Teck (born 3 July 1959) is a Malaysian politician who served as Member of the Malacca State Legislative Assembly (MLA) for Kelebang from May 2018 to November 2021. He was a member of People's Justice Party (PKR), a component party of the Pakatan Harapan (PH) coalition. He was defeated in his re-election bid during the 2021 Malacca state election. In May 2026, he left PKR to join the newly formed Parti Bersama Malaysia (BERSAMA) and was subsequently appointed as the party's Malacca state chief.

== Election results ==
Malacca State Legislative Assembly
| Year | Constituency | Candidate | Votes | Pct | Opponent(s) | Votes | Pct | Ballots cast | Majority | Turnout |
|---|---|---|---|---|---|---|---|---|---|---|
| 2018 | N14 Kelebang | Gue Teck (PKR) | 7,648 | 45.58% | Lim Ban Hong (MCA) | 6,859 | 40.88% | 17,059 | 789 | 84.59% |
| 2018 | N14 Kelebang | Gue Teck (PKR) | 7,648 | 45.58% | Mohd Syafiq Ismail (PAS) | 2,272 | 13.54% | 17,059 | 789 | 84.59% |
| 2021 | N14 Kelebang | Gue Teck (PKR) | 4,152 | 31.78% | Lim Ban Hong (MCA) | 5,028 | 38.49% | 13,247 | 876 | 66.31% |
| 2021 | N14 Kelebang | Gue Teck (PKR) | 4,152 | 31.78% | Bakri Jamaluddin (PAS) | 3,884 | 29.73% | 13,247 | 876 | 66.31% |

== Honours ==
- Malacca
  - Companion Class II of the Exalted Order of Malacca (DPSM) – Datuk (2019)
