= Poh Ah Tiam =

Malaysian politician

Yang Berbahagia Datuk Wira Poh Ah Tiam DCSM DMSM
- 傅润添

Member of the Malacca State Legislative Assembly for Machap
- In office 21 March 2004 – 15 March 2007
- Preceded by: Constituency newly re-created
- Succeeded by: Lai Meng Chong (BN–MCA)
- Majority: 4,562 (2004)

Member of the Malacca State Legislative Assembly for Bukit Sedanan
- In office 25 April 1995 – 21 March 2004
- Preceded by: Constituency created
- Succeeded by: Constituency abolished
- Majority: 4,497 (1995); 2,626 (1999)

Member of the Malacca State Legislative Assembly for Pulau Sebang
- In office 3 August 1986 – 24 April 1995
- Preceded by: Constituency created
- Succeeded by: Mohd Shariff Mohd Drus
- Majority: 1,620 (1986); 2,739 (1990)

Personal details
- Born: 1 April 1952 Kampung Belimbing, Durian Tunggal, Malacca, Federation of Malaya
- Died: 15 March 2007 (aged 54) Malacca, Malaysia
- Party: Malaysian Chinese Association (MCA)
- Spouse: Tan Moi King
- Children: Poh Sin Ee, Poh Sin Huei and Poh Sin Yoong
- Occupation: Politician
- Profession: Teacher; Businessman

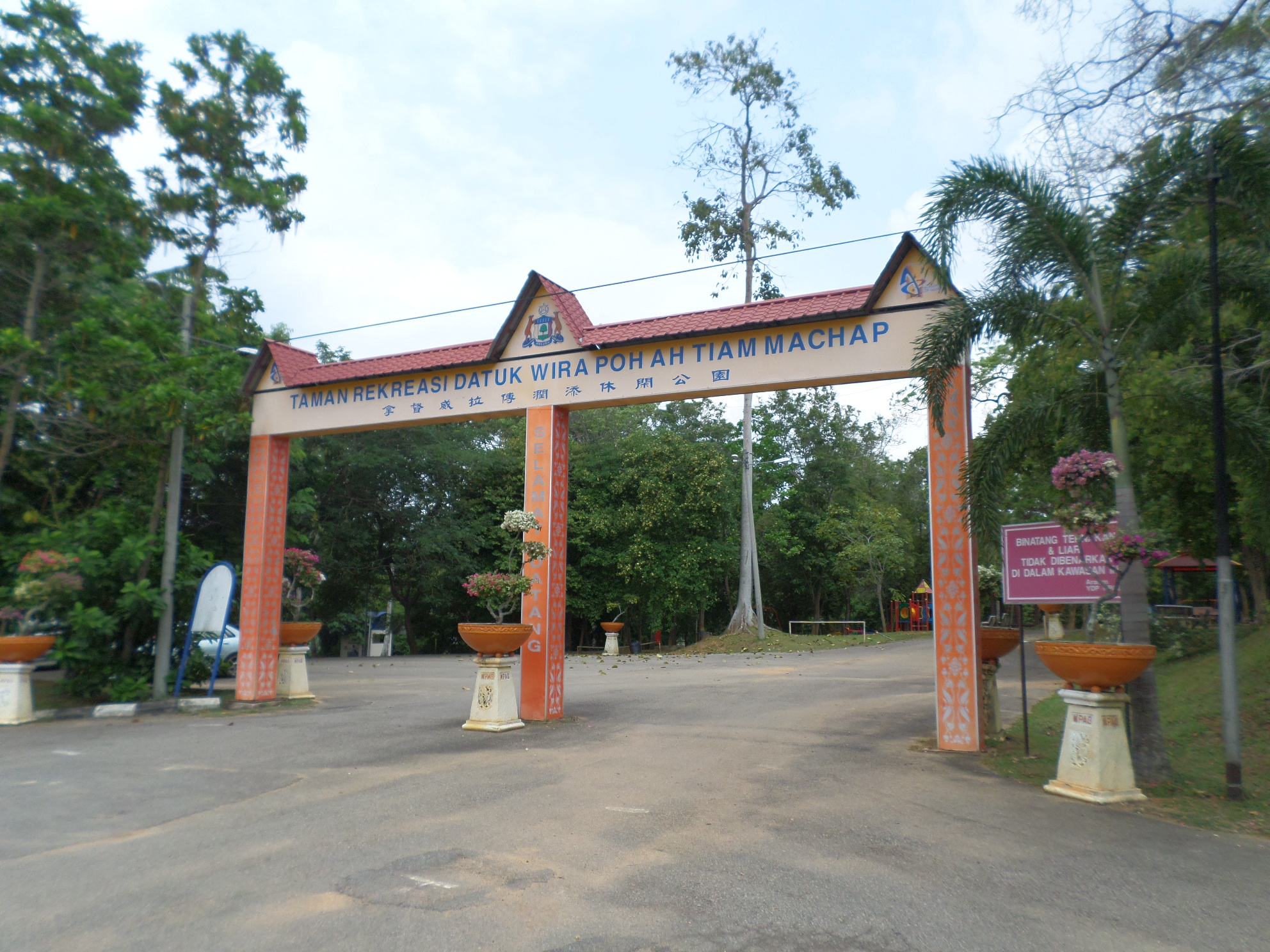
Datuk Wira Poh Ah Tiam Machap Recreational Park

Poh Ah Tiam (simplified Chinese: 傅润添; traditional Chinese: 傅潤添; pinyin: Fù Rùntiān; 1 April 1952 – 15 March 2007) was a Malaysian politician, businessman and community leader of Chinese descent. Poh was born in Kampung Belimbing, near Durian Tunggal, Malacca. He and his family moved to nearby Machap Baru, where Poh in later years contributed significantly to the small town's development.

After working as a teacher and later venturing into business, Poh stood as a state assembly candidate for Pulau Sebang in the 1986 General Elections and won, beginning his political career. He was the Malacca state Malaysian Chinese Association (MCA) and the Malacca State Housing and Local Government Committee Chairman, as well as the Malacca state assemblyman for Pulau Sebang (1986-1995), Bukit Sedanan (1995-2004) and Machap (2004-2007). During his tenure, the Machap Baru town saw extensive development, with new housing and public facilities constructed.

Poh died on 15 March 2007 at the Pantai Hospital Malacca due to renal failure arising from lymphatic cancer, triggered a by-election in Machap on 12 April 2007, which elects Lai Meng Chong of Malaysian Chinese Association, Barisan Nasional as its assemblyman. Following his death, a highway and a recreational park in Machap Baru were built and named after him to commemorate his contribution to the state.

== Election results ==
Malacca State Legislative Assembly
Year	Constituency	Candidate	Votes	Pct	Opponent(s)	Votes	Pct	Ballots cast	Majority	Turnout
1986	N05 Pulau Sebang	Poh Ah Tiam (MCA)	3,695	61.69%	Ang Kuang Meng (DAP)	2,075	34.64%	5,990	1,620	63.68%
1990	N05 Pulau Sebang	Poh Ah Tiam (MCA)	4,325	70.33%	Lim Swee (DAP)	1,586	25.79%	6,150	2,739	69.05%
1995	N07 Bukit Sedanan	Poh Ah Tiam (MCA)	5,869	78.03%	Wong Chin Chye (DAP)	1,372	18.24%	7,521	1,399	73.50%
1999	N07 Bukit Sedanan	Poh Ah Tiam (MCA)	4,966	65.89%	Zamani Abd Wahid (keADILan)	2,340	31.05%	7,537	2,626	73.97%
2004	N08 Machap	Poh Ah Tiam (MCA)	5,847	79.55%	Liou Chen Kuang (DAP)	1,285	17.48%	7,350	4,562	74.33%

== Honours ==
- Malacca
  - Knight Commander of the Exalted Order of Malacca (DCSM) – Datuk Wira (2001)
  - Companion I of the Exalted Order of Malacca (DMSM) – Datuk (1992)
