= Bakri Jamaluddin =

Malaysian politician (born 1964)

Yang Berhormat Tuan Bakri Jamaluddin MP
- بكري جمال الدين
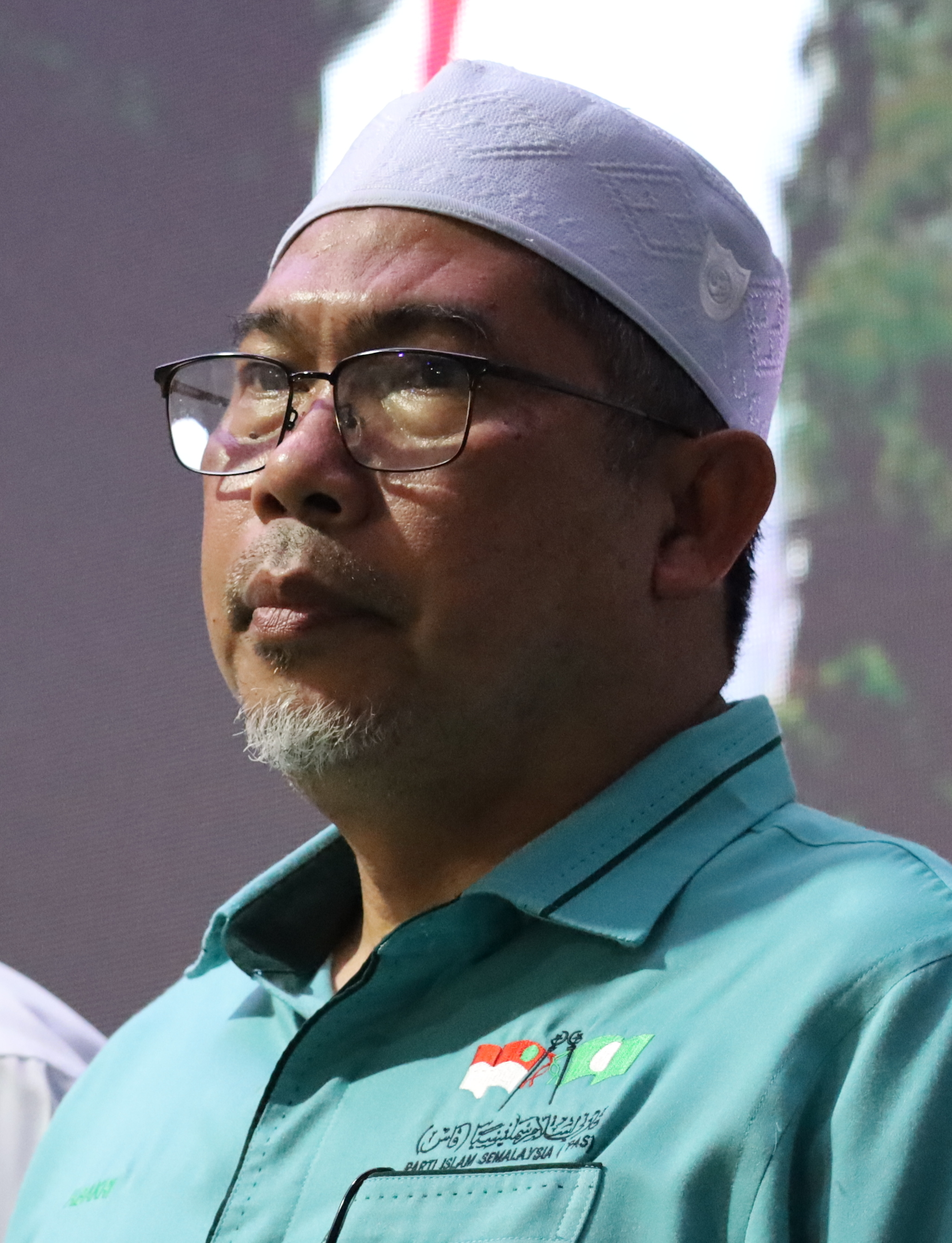
- Bakri in 2024

Member of the Malaysian Parliament for Tangga Batu
- Incumbent
- Assumed office 19 November 2022
- Preceded by: Rusnah Aluai (PH–PKR)
- Majority: 8,849 (2022)

Personal details
- Born: Bakri bin Jamaluddin; 14 December 1964 (age 61) Tangga Batu, Malacca Town, Malacca, Malaysia
- Citizenship: Malaysian
- Party: Malaysian Islamic Party (PAS)
- Other political affiliations: Perikatan Nasional (PN)
- Occupation: Politician

Bakri bin Jamaluddin (born 14 December 1964) is a Malaysian politician who has served as the Member of Parliament (MP) for Tangga Batu since November 2022. He is a member of the Malaysian Islamic Party (PAS), a component party of the Perikatan Nasional (PN) coalition.

== Election results ==
Malacca State Legislative Assembly
Year	Constituency	Candidate	Votes	Pct	Opponent(s)	Votes	Pct	Ballots cast	Majority	Turnout
2021	N14 Kelebang	Bakri Jamaluddin (PAS)	3,884	29.73%	Lim Ban Hong (MCA)	5,028	38.49%	13,064	876	66.31%
2021	N14 Kelebang	Bakri Jamaluddin (PAS)	3,884	29.73%	Gue Teck (PKR)	4,152	31.78%	13,064	876	66.31%

Parliament of Malaysia
Year	Constituency	Candidate	Votes	Pct	Opponent(s)	Votes	Pct	Ballots cast	Majority	Turnout
2022	P136 Tangga Batu	Bakri Jamaluddin (PAS)	37,406	40.65%	Rusnah Aluai (PKR)	28,557	31.03%	92,027	8,849	80.19%
2022	P136 Tangga Batu	Bakri Jamaluddin (PAS)	37,406	40.65%	Lim Ban Hong (MCA)	25,095	27.27%	92,027	8,849	80.19%
2022	P136 Tangga Batu	Bakri Jamaluddin (PAS)	37,406	40.65%	Ghazali Abu (PUTRA)	702	0.76%	92,027	8,849	80.19%
2022	P136 Tangga Batu	Bakri Jamaluddin (PAS)	37,406	40.65%	Shahril Mahmood (IND)	267	0.29%	92,027	8,849	80.19%

== Honours ==
=== Honours of Malaysia ===
- Malaysia
  - Recipient of the 17th Yang di-Pertuan Agong Installation Medal (2024)
