= Rembia =

State constituency in Malacca, Malaysia

Rembia (N06)
Malacca constituency

State constituency
- Legislature: Malacca State Legislative Assembly
MLA
Ahmad Norazril Abd Aziz
BN
- Constituency created: 1994
- First contested: 1995
- Last contested: 2026

Demographics
- Electors (2026): 23,291

N06 Rembia within Malacca, as used for the 2021 state election

Rembia is a state constituency in Malacca, Malaysia, that has been represented in the Melaka State Legislative Assembly.

The state constituency was first contested in 1995 and is mandated to return a single Assemblyman to the Melaka State Legislative Assembly under the first-past-the-post voting system. It has been represented by Muhammad Jailani Khamis of Perikatan Nasional (PN) since 2023, Barisan Nasional (BN) from 2021 to 2023, Independent from 2020 to 2021 and Pakatan Harapan (PH) from 2018 to 2020.

== Definition ==
The Rembia constituency contains the polling districts of Pekan Alor Gajah, Kelemak, Jelatang, Kampung Tebat, Sungai Petai, Pekan Rembia and Jeram.

== Demographics ==
Ethnic breakdown of Rembia's electorate as of 2026
1. Malays (67.7%)
2. Chinese (16.7%)
3. Indians (14.5%)
4. Other Ethnicities (1.00%)

== History ==
=== Polling districts ===
According to the gazette issued on 5 November 2026, the Rembia constituency has a total of 7 polling districts.

State constituency	Polling districts	Code	Location
Rembia (N06)	Pekan Alor Gajah	135/06/01	SK Alor Gajah 1; SJK (T) Alor Gajah
Rembia (N06)	Kelemak	135/06/02	SK Dato' Naning
Rembia (N06)	Jelatang	135/06/03	Kolej Vokesional Datuk Seri Mohd Zin
Rembia (N06)	Kampung Tebat	135/06/04	SMK Dato' Dol Said
Rembia (N06)	Sungai Petai	135/06/05	SK Sungai Petai
Rembia (N06)	Pekan Rembia	135/06/06	SJK (C) Kiow Min
Rembia (N06)	Jeram	135/06/07	SK Rembia

=== Representation history ===
Members of the Legislative Assembly for Rembia
Assembly	No	Years	Member	Party
Constituency created from Kelemak and Tanjong Minyak
9th	N10	1995 – 1999	Hamdin Abdollah	BN (UMNO)
10th	N10	1999 – 2004	Hamdin Abdollah	BN (UMNO)
11th	N06	2004 – 2008	Abdul Wahab Abdul Latip	BN (UMNO)
12th	N06	2008 – 2013	Norpipah Abdol	BN (UMNO)
13th	N06	2013 – 2018	Norpipah Abdol	BN (UMNO)
14th	N06	2018 – 2020	Muhammad Jailani Khamis	PH (PKR)
14th	N06	2020 – 2021	Muhammad Jailani Khamis	Independent
14th	N06	2021	Muhammad Jailani Khamis	BN (UMNO)
15th	N06	2021 – 2023	Muhammad Jailani Khamis	BN (UMNO)
15th	N06	2023 – 2026	Muhammad Jailani Khamis	PN (PAS)
16th	N06	2026 – present	Ahmad Norazril Abd Aziz	BN (UMNO)

== Election results ==
Malacca state election, 2026: Rembia
Party	Candidate	Votes	%	∆%
BN	Ahmad Norazril Abd Aziz	10,915	65.77	▲24.16
PH	Mohd Khuzaire Mohd Kamal Kannan	4,922	29.66	▼3.48
BERSAMA	Muhamed Aman Akil Abdul Talib	758	4.57	▲4.57
Total valid votes		16,595	100.00	
Total rejected ballots		140		
Unreturned ballots		18		
Turnout		16,753	71.93	▲6.21
Registered electors		23,291		
Majority		5,993	36.11	▲27.64
BN hold		Swing		
Source(s) https://electiondata.my/elections/mlk/SE-16/

Malacca state election, 2021: Rembia
Party	Candidate	Votes	%	∆%
BN	Muhammad Jailani Khamis	4,224	41.61	▲3.26
PH	Zamri Pakiri	3,364	33.14	▲33.14
PN	Zamzuri Ariffin	2,433	23.97	▲23.97
Independent	Sabarudin Kudus	67	0.66	▲0.66
Independent	Murali Krishnan	64	0.63	▲0.63
Total valid votes		10,152		
Total rejected ballots		182		
Unreturned ballots		21		
Turnout		10,355	65.72	▼18.54
Registered electors		15,756		
Majority		860	8.47	▼5.55
BN gain from PKR		Swing		?
Source(s) https://lom.agc.gov.my/ilims/upload/portal/akta/outputp/1715764/PUB%20583.pdf

Malacca state election, 2018: Rembia
Party	Candidate	Votes	%	∆%
PKR	Muhammad Jailani Khamis	6,773	52.37	▲12.71
BN	Norpipah Abdol	4,959	38.35	▼21.99
PAS	Mohammad Rashidi Abd Razak	1,200	9.28	▲9.28
Total valid votes		12,932	100.00	
Total rejected ballots		204		
Unreturned ballots		39		
Turnout		13,175	84.26	▼2.36
Registered electors		15,636		
Majority		1,814	14.02	▼6.66
PKR gain from BN		Swing		?

Malacca state election, 2013: Rembia
Party	Candidate	Votes	%	∆%
BN	Norpipah Abdol	6,879	60.34	▼6.64
PKR	Rusnah Aluai	4,521	39.66	▲6.64
Total valid votes		11,400	100.00	
Total rejected ballots		217		
Unreturned ballots		0		
Turnout		11,617	86.62	▲7.93
Registered electors		13,412		
Majority		2,358	20.68	▼13.28
BN hold		Swing		
Source(s) "Federal Government Gazette - Notice of Contested Election, State Legislative Assembly for the State of Selangor [P.U. (B) 192/2013]" (PDF). Attorney General's Chambers of Malaysia. 26 April 2013. Archived from the original (PDF) on 29 December 2019. "Federal Government Gazette - Results of Contested Election and Statements of the Poll after the Official Addition of Votes, State Constituencies for the State of Selangor [P.U. (B) 233/2013]". Attorney General's Chambers of Malaysia. 22 May 2013. Archived from the original (PDF) on 2 October 2018.

Malacca state election, 2008: Rembia
Party	Candidate	Votes	%	∆%
BN	Norpipah Abdol	5,605	66.98	▼13.81
PKR	Md Yusof Abdullah	2,763	33.02	▲33.02
Total valid votes		8,368	100.00	
Total rejected ballots		214		
Unreturned ballots		31		
Turnout		8,613	78.69	▲0.27
Registered electors		10,946		
Majority		2,842	33.96	▼27.62
BN hold		Swing		

Malacca state election, 2004: Rembia
Party	Candidate	Votes	%
BN	Abdul Wahab Abdul Latip	6,266	80.79
PAS	Jamaat Omar	1,490	19.21
Total valid votes		7,756	100.00
Total rejected ballots		255	
Unreturned ballots		0	
Turnout		8,011	78.42
Registered electors		10,215	
Majority		4,776	61.58
This was a new constituency created.
