= Ginie Lim Siew Lin =

Malaysian politician

Yang Berbahagia Datuk Ginie Lim Siew Lin DMSM
- 林秀凌
- Lim in 2023

Member of the Malacca State Executive Council
- In office 16 May 2018 – 2 March 2020 (Women, Family Development and Welfare Affairs)
- Governor: Mohd Khalil Yaakob
- Chief Minister: Adly Zahari
- Preceded by: Latifah Omar
- Succeeded by: Latifah Omar
- Constituency: Machap Jaya

Member of the Malacca State Legislative Assembly for Machap Jaya
- In office 9 May 2018 – 20 November 2021
- Preceded by: Lai Meng Chong (BN–MCA)
- Succeeded by: Ngwe Hee Sem (BN–MCA)
- Majority: 1,336 (2018)

Faction represented in Malacca State Legislative Assembly
- 2018–2021: Pakatan Harapan

Personal details
- Born: Ginie Lim Siew Lin; 18 August 1981 (age 45) Malacca, Malaysia
- Party: People's Justice Party (PKR) (since 2005)
- Other political affiliations: Pakatan Rakyat (PR) (2008–2015); Pakatan Harapan (PH) (since 2015)
- Children: 2
- Parent: Lim Ah Seng (father)
- Education: Melaka Girl High School & Gajah Berang National Secondary School
- Alma mater: University of Science Malaysia & University of Sussex (Bachelor's degree in Mass Communication & Master's degree in Poverty and Development)
- Occupation: Politician
- Ginie Lim Siew Lin on Facebook

Ginie Lim Siew Lin
- Lim in 2024

Chinese name
- Traditional Chinese: 林秀凌
- Simplified Chinese: 林秀凌
- Hanyu Pinyin: Lín Xiùlíng
- Jyutping: Lam4 Sau3 Ling4
- Hokkien POJ: Lîm Siù-lêng

Ginie Lim Siew Lin (Chinese: 林秀凌; pinyin: Lín Xiùlíng) is a Malaysian politician who served as Member of the Malacca State Executive Council (EXCO) in the Pakatan Harapan (PH) state administration under former chief minister Adly Zahari from May 2018 to the collapse of the PH state administration in March 2020 and Member of the Malacca State Legislative Assembly (MLA) for Machap Jaya from May 2018 to November 2021. Lim is currently the chief executive officer of Invest Melaka, the state's investment promotion agency under the leadership of Chief Minister Ab Rauf Yusoh.

Lim was a progressive student leader during her years in Universiti Sains Malaysia. After graduated, she held National Secretary position in Malaysian Youth and Student Democratic Movement (DEMA) and Secretary of Solidariti Mahasiswa Malaysia (SMM) before she joined PKR in 2005. Lim, who is trilingual in Malay, Chinese and English, served as media coordinator under the party's Information Bureau led by Tian Chua.

Lim first participated in the 2008 Malaysian general election as one of the youngest women candidates at age 27 years old. She stood in Machap (former name of Machap Jaya), her mother's hometown where she grew up. She lost by 1,639 votes to the MCA candidate but she stood again in 2013 after returning from her further study in England and lost by 152 votes.

In her third attempt in 2018, after consistent groundwork over 10 years in rural area, Lim made a breakthrough in Machap Jaya for the first time and won against the former Alor Gajah Parliamentarian and MCA leader Koh Nai Kwang with 1,336 votes.

Before being elected, Lim served the late Tan Sri Khalid Ibrahim, former Menteri Besar of Selangor under Pakatan Rakyat government as the state's Chief Public Relations Officer in 2009 after working as the Opposition Leader Office's Media Coordinator under Dr Wan Azizah Wan Ismail for a year.

Lim was offered the Chevening Scholarship to further study Master in Poverty and Development at the Institute of Development Studies, University Of Sussex, England in 2010. Lim returned in 2011 and joined the party's think tank Institut Rakyat after she contested and lost in the General Election in 2013. She then joined the office of Selangor's Menteri Besar Azmin Ali as Media and Research Officer in 2016 for 2 years.

Since 2018, Lim held the position of Alor Gajah Division Chief. Previously she was the Youth and Women Chief of PKR Malacca, and Deputy Chief of National Information Bureau.

Lim has worked on women empowerment, gender inclusivity, sustainable development, and enhancement of Orang Asli and special needs children.

Lim was dropped from Machap Jaya candidacy for the 2021 Malacca state election. The decision was received with some protest from grassroots party members. Lim continued to campaign for Pakatan Harapan in the state election.

In the 2022 General Election, Lim was appointed as the campaign advisor to the Alor Gajah Parliament candidate Adly Zahari from Amanah. Lim has led a multiracial campaign supporting Adly Zahari. Adly Zahari won the parliament seat and was appointed as the Deputy Minister of Defence in December 2022.

In July 2023, Lim was invited to join Invest Melaka under the leadership of Chief Minister Ab Rauf Yusoh. Lim's administrative experience and business networks supported her new role as the chief executive officer of the state's investment promotion agency. Invest Melaka is given the mandate by the state government to become the first-point-of-contact for investors via the fast lane of Melaka Industrial Booster.

In January 2024, Lim was unjustly suspended from her position as PKR Alor Gajah Division Chief and Melaka Vice Chief for 12 months despite her loyalty to the leadership and party's struggle. Many have shown support for Lim to continue to lead the grassroots while the deputy division chief takes over the administration of Alor Gajah Division temporarily.

In 2025 PKR Party Election, Ginie Lim contested for PKR Alor Gajah Division Chief and National Women Central Committee. She lost at the division election due to system manipulation as her team won. However, she won at the national women election. She was then appointed as PKR Women's Wing Information Chief by the National Women Chief Fadhlina Sidek. She trained women's wing grassroots leaders in preparation for Sabah, Negeri Sembilan and Johor state election.

In October 2026, Ginie Lim stepped down from Invest Melaka after completing her mission of repositioning and strengthening the organisation. Her key achievements and contributions include successfully organizing the Chief Minister Industrial Excellence Award Night in December 2025, and working closely with Malaysia Semiconductor Industry Association in drafting the Melaka Semiconductor Strategy Plan in April 2026.

== Election results ==
Malacca State Legislative Assembly
Year	Constituency		Votes	Pct	Opponent(s)	Votes	Pct	Ballots cast	Majority	Turnout%
2008	N08 Machap	Ginie Lim Siew Lin (PKR)	3,068	39.46%	Lai Meng Chong (MCA)	4,707	60.54%	7,986	1,639	77.10%
2013	N08 Machap	Ginie Lim Siew Lin (PKR)	4,851	48.92%	Lai Meng Chong (MCA)	5,003	50.46%	10,123	152	86.80%
2013	N08 Machap	Ginie Lim Siew Lin (PKR)	4,851	48.92%	Ravinther Sekaran (KITA)	61	0.62%	10,123	152	86.80%
2018	N08 Machap Jaya	Ginie Lim Siew Lin (PKR)	5,550	52.67%	Koh Nai Kwong (MCA)	4,214	39.98%	10,718	1,336	84.30%
2018	N08 Machap Jaya	Ginie Lim Siew Lin (PKR)	5,550	52.67%	Wan Zahidi Wan Ismail (PAS)	775	7.35%	10,718	1,336	84.30%
2026	N08 Machap Jaya	Ginie Lim Siew Lin (PKR)	4,450	38.98%	Ngwe Hee Sem (MCA)	6,686	58.56%	11,417	2,236	71.89%
2026	N08 Machap Jaya	Ginie Lim Siew Lin (PKR)	4,450	38.98%	Prasanth Kumar Brakasam (BERSAMA)	281	2.46%	11,417	2,236	71.89%

== Honours ==
=== Honours of Malaysia ===
- Malacca
  - Companion Class I of the Order of Malacca (DMSM) – Datuk (2019)
