= 2007 Machap by-election =

Election in Malaysia

- 12 April 2007

Machap seat in the Melaka State Legislative Assembly
	BN	DAP
Candidate	Lai Meng Chong	Liou Chen Kuang
Party	BN (MCA)	DAP
Popular vote	5,533	1,452
Percentage	79.21%	20.79%
Machap assemblyman before election
Poh Ah Tiam
BN (MCA)
Elected Machap assemblyman
Lai Meng Chong
BN (MCA)

The 2007 Machap by-election was held on 12 April 2007. The seat in the state assembly of Malacca, Malaysia, fell vacant after the incumbent, Datuk Wira Poh Ah Tiam of the Malaysian Chinese Association (MCA), died on 15 March that year. On 21 March 2007, the Election Commission of Malaysia (EC) announced 3 April 2007 as the nomination day and 12 April 2007 the election date. The MCA candidate, Lai Meng Chong eventually defeated the opposition candidate of Liou Chen Kuang, with a reduced majority compared to the previous 2004 election.

== Background ==
State assembly seat N.08 Machap lies in parliamentary seat P.135 Alor Gajah. As of the 2004 General Elections, Machap was a majority Chinese seat (45.6%), followed by Malays (38.3%), Indians (15.3%) and others (0.7%). In the 2004 election, the late Datuk Wira Poh Ah Tiam of the MCA, a component party of the Barisan Nasional (BN) coalition, garnered 5,847 votes, defeating Liou Chen Kuang of the Democratic Action Party (DAP) (1,285 votes) by a majority of 4,562 votes.

== Candidates ==
=== Pre-nomination speculation ===
The English language daily The Star reported on 17 March 2007 that the opposition People's Justice Party (PKR) was the first to express interest in contesting the seat, with its information chief Tian Chua as the likely candidate. Meanwhile, on 20 March 2007, the Islamic Party of Malaysia (PAS) declared it would not field a candidate in the by-election, citing the fact that the seat has traditionally been a DAP versus BN contest. The DAP and the ruling BN declined to comment on their plans until after Poh's funeral on 21 March 2007.

Nonetheless, this did not stop the media from speculating. Those linked to Datuk Seri Dr Fong Chan Onn, the Malaysian Minister of Human Resources, MP for Alor Gajah and MCA vice-president, were named as possible BN candidates. The list included Fong's special assistant Ngow Dow Soon, his political secretary Lai Meng Chong and his private secretary Chew Chong Lin. From the opposition camp, besides PKR's Tian Chua, potential candidates from the DAP include Liou Chen Kuang, whom Poh had beaten in the last general election, or Tey Kok Kiew, special assistant to the party's secretary-general Lim Guan Eng.

On 22 March 2007, PKR and DAP reached an agreement, whereby PKR will yield the seat to DAP in the by-election, but will contest the seat in the next General Elections. PKR has also agreed to provide support to DAP but will not be directly involved in campaigning. Meanwhile, MCA president Datuk Seri Ong Ka Ting announced on 26 March 2007 that an MCA Presidential Council meeting on 27 March 2007 will choose the BN's candidate. The chosen candidate will be revealed after obtaining formal approval from the BN chairman, incumbent Prime Minister Abdullah Ahmad Badawi.

=== Nominated candidates ===
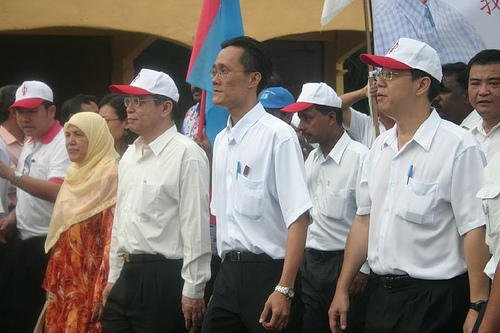
The DAP candidate was Liou Chen Kuang (centre, foreground, without cap).

On 30 March 2007, the DAP announced its candidate for the seat in the 2004 General Elections, 33-year-old Liou Chen Kuang, will contest in the by-election. Liou, a businessman, was chosen again despite losing in the last election. He was chosen due to his "knowledge of the local terrain", grassroots support, and his willingness "to serve Machap constituents". The DAP also announced it would use the slogan Machap Demokrasi (Machap Democracy) to raise awareness among voters on the importance of democracy in Malaysia.

Three days later, on 2 April 2007, the BN deputy chairman and incumbent Deputy Prime Minister Dato' Sri Najib Tun Razak named a local MCA politician, 56-year-old Lai Meng Chong as the coalition's candidate for the by-election.

=== Nomination day scuffle ===
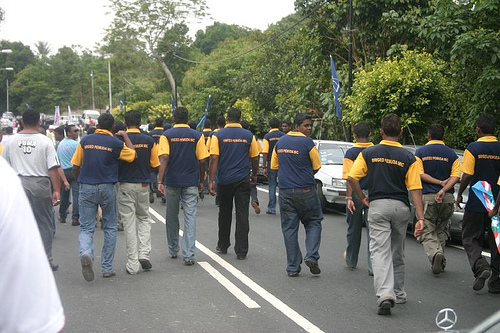
Groups of supporters from parties on both sides, such as the Malaysian Indian Congress (MIC), were involved in scuffles.

During nomination day on 3 April 2007, a scuffle occurred between DAP and BN supporters. Two DAP supporters were injured in the scuffle, which erupted after some name-calling and sloganeering. Following the incident, police arrested a man after receiving four reports, two from the injured man, and two each from a journalist and a photographer from the Tamil dailies Malaysian Nanban and Makkal Osai, respectively.

== Issues ==
=== Election irregularities ===
The opposition parties had alleged that the country's election process was not transparent and could be manipulated. However, the EC chairman, Tan Sri Abdul Rashid Abdul Rahman on 21 March 2007 denied the allegations and challenged political parties to take the commission to court on the matter. Despite the denial, the DAP described the EC's move of not fixing the elections on a weekend as an "act of biasness to benefit the BN".

On 27 March 2007, as an attempt to counter the opposition's grievances on the transparency of the election process, the EC announced that new, translucent plastic ballot boxes will be used in the by-elections, replacing the black metal ballot boxes used in previous elections. According to the EC, the new box is also lighter at only 500 grams, as compared to the metal box, which weighed 1.5 kg.

=== Opposition boycott ===
Due to alleged irregularities in the Malaysian election process, two major opposition parties, PAS and DAP, boycotted the January 2007 Batu Talam State by-election in Pahang, which the BN won after defeating an independent candidate. DAP's decision to now contest in Machap has led the BN to accuse opposition parties of being "inconsistent" with regards to boycotting elections.

=== Chinese support for the BN ===
Some pundits opine that the Machap by-election, given the constituency's ethnic composition, may reflect support from the Chinese community for the ruling BN. Many Chinese voters abandoned the BN in the 2006 Sarawak state elections, BN's worst showing in a long time in the traditionally safe state, whereby nine seats, seven of which were predominantly Chinese, went to the opposition. The dissatisfaction was because of economic issues and a renewed push by some Malay BN politicians for more privileges under the Malaysian New Economic Policy. A December 2006 survey by independent social research outfit the Merdeka Centre, found that 60% of Chinese voters nationwide were open to voting for the opposition.

Some pundits argue the by-election might not reflect the purported general sentiments of the Chinese. They believe that the DAP faces an uphill battle against the incumbent BN, as Machap is a rural constituency whereby local concerns predominate national issues and constituents are more conservative and less receptive to change. Furthermore, the deceased Datuk Wira Poh Ah Tiam was popular and had a good service record in Machap, having served for three consecutive terms and bringing tangible development in the constituency.

=== Alleged DAP-PAS secret co-operation pact ===
The day before the election, Malaysiakini reported that BN had distributed 1,000 VCDs containing a video clip of a campaigner from the PKR stating that a vote for the DAP would be a vote for the Barisan Alternatif, a coalition comprising PKR and PAS. The DAP was a former member of the coalition, but pulled out after disagreement on PAS' advocacy of an Islamic state. MCA vice-president Datuk Seri Dr Fong Chan Onn alleged the video was proof of the DAP's covert co-operation with PAS, and stated that BN had "to let the people in Machap know that voting for DAP will help realise PAS' plan to turn Malaysia into a theocratic state".

The EC also stated that 50 PAS party flags had been removed, as PAS was not contesting the by-election. The DAP alleged that the flags had not been put up by PAS, and claimed that BN supporters had raised them. Confronted by the media on the DAP's claims, Fong denied any knowledge of such actions, calling it "just speculation".

== Election day ==
Voter turnout was low in the morning, reaching only 23% by 11.00 am. However, turnout picked up at lunchtime, hitting 59.2% by 3.00pm. Weather conditions were generally favorable throughout the day with only scattered showers in late afternoon, which resulted in the relatively high turnout of 74.4% at the 5.00 pm close.

However, the day was marred by allegations of vote-buying against the BN made by the DAP. According to a DAP party worker, a tip-off was received by the party at around 12.00 pm that a vacant house was used to disburse vote-buying money. Voters were alleged to have received as much as RM200 (ca. US$58) from BN operatives. However, in an immediate reaction, MCA president Dato' Seri Ong Ka Ting brushed off the allegation, calling the DAP's allegations baseless and made for "political mileage".

== Post-election controversy ==
In a post-election analysis, senior DAP leader Tony Pua alleged that although BN and Lai had been caught in the act offering to renovate houses and passing out free food and drinks, in direct contravention of electoral laws, the Election Commission had taken no action.

The DAP later filed a complaint with the EC over the alleged vote-buying incidents, including claims that the government had announced development projects to secure support. The EC chairman rejected the latter allegation, stating that such actions were legal and within the government's discretion. MCA president Ong also rejected the claims, saying it was common for the opposition to make such allegations after electoral defeats, and accused the DAP of being contradictory in first blaming the government for not developing Machap, but later saying the development was vote-buying.

== By-election results ==
Malacca state by-election, 12 April 2007: Machap Upon the death of incumbent, Poh Ah Tiam
Party	Candidate	Votes	%	∆%
BN	Lai Meng Chong	5,533	79.21	
DAP	Liou Chen Kuang	1,452	20.79	
Total valid votes		6,985	100.00	
Total rejected ballots		166		
Unreturned ballots				
Turnout		7,151	74.31	
Registered electors		9,623		
Majority		4,081		
BN hold		Swing		
