= Mohd Aleef Yusof =

Malaysian politician

Member of the Malacca State Legislative Assembly for Sungai Udang
- In office 20 December 2021 – 14 November 2026
- Preceded by: Idris Haron (BN–UMNO)
- Majority: 530 (2021)

Personal details
- Born: Mohd Aleef bin Yusof; 17 January 1986 (age 40) Kandang, Malacca
- Party: Malaysian United Indigenous Party (BERSATU) (until 2026); National Vision Party (WAWASAN) (2026–present)
- Other political affiliations: Perikatan Nasional (PN)
- Spouse: Dr. Nurul Liyana Husain
- Education: Management & Science University (MSU) (MBBS)
- Occupation: Politician
- Profession: Medical officer

Mohd Aleef bin Yusof (born 17 January 1986) is Malaysian politician and doctor who served as Member of the Malacca State Legislative Assembly (MLA) for Sungai Udang since November 2021. He is a member of the National Vision Party (WAWASAN), a component party of Perikatan Nasional (PN).

== Election results ==
Malacca State Legislative Assembly
Year	Constituency	Candidate	Votes	Pct	Opponent(s)	Votes	Pct	Ballots cast	Majority	Turnout
2021	N11 Sungai Udang	Mohd Aleef Yusof (BERSATU)	6,789	43.65%	Mohamad Ali Mohamad (UMNO)	6,259	40.24%	15,990	530	70.15%
2021	N11 Sungai Udang	Mohd Aleef Yusof (BERSATU)	6,789	43.65%	Hasmorni Tamby (PKR)	2,035	13.08%	15,990	530	70.15%
2021	N11 Sungai Udang	Mohd Aleef Yusof (BERSATU)	6,789	43.65%	Mohd Zahar Hashim (IND)	471	3.03%	15,990	530	70.15%
