= Kelebang (state constituency) =

Kelebang (N14)
Malacca constituency

State constituency
- Legislature: Malacca State Legislative Assembly
MLA
Lim Ban Hong
BN
- Constituency created: 2004
- First contested: 2004
- Last contested: 2026

Demographics
- Electors (2026): 27,339

N14 Kelebang within Malacca, as used for the 2021 state election

Kelebang is a state constituency in Malacca, Malaysia, that has been represented in the Malacca State Legislative Assembly.

The state constituency was first contested in 2004 and is mandated to return a single Assemblyman to the Malacca State Legislative Assembly under the first-past-the-post voting system.

== Definition ==
The Kelebang constituency contains the polling districts of Seberang Gajah, Bukit Rambai, Kampung Pinang, Kelebang Besar, Pulau Gadong, Pekan Kelebang Besar and Kelebang Kechil.

== Demographics ==
Ethnic breakdown of Kelebang's electorate as of 2026
1. Malay (68.5%)
2. Chinese (27.0%)
3. Indian (2.30%)
4. Other ethnicities (2.20%)

== History ==
=== Polling districts ===
According to the gazette issued on 5 November 2026, the Kelebang constituency has a total of 7 polling districts.

State constituency	Polling districts	Code	Location
Kelebang (N14)	Seberang Gajah	136/14/01	SK Taman Bukit Rambai; SMK Bukit Rambai
Kelebang (N14)	Bukit Rambai	136/14/02	SK Bukit Rambai; SJK (C) Ying Chye
Kelebang (N14)	Kampung Pinang	136/14/03	SMK Klebang Besar
Kelebang (N14)	Klebang Besar	136/14/04	SR Arab Batang Tiga Timur
Kelebang (N14)	Pulau Gadong	136/14/05	SRA (JAIM) Klebang Besar
Kelebang (N14)	Pekan Klebang Besar	136/14/06	SK Klebang Besar
Kelebang (N14)	Klebang Kechil	136/14/07	SJK (C) Lih Jen

=== Representation history ===
Members of the Legislative Assembly for Kelebang
Assembly	No	Years	Member	Party
Constituency created from Tangga Batu and Paya Rumput
11th	N14	2004 – 2008	Seet Har Cheow (薛亚朝)	BN (MCA)
12th	N14	2008 – 2013	Seet Har Cheow (薛亚朝)	BN (MCA)
13th	N14	2013 – 2018	Lim Ban Hong (林万锋)	BN (MCA)
14th	N14	2018 – 2021	Gue Teck (魏世德)	PH (PKR)
15th	N14	2021 – 2026	Lim Ban Hong (林万锋)	BN (MCA)
16th	N14	2026 – present	Lim Ban Hong (林万锋)	BN (MCA)

== Election results ==
Malacca state election, 2026
Party	Candidate	Votes	%	∆%
BN	Lim Ban Hong	12,522	63.57	▲25.08
PH	Farzana Hayani Mohd Nasir	5,487	27.86	▼3.92
BERSATU	Mohamad Ali Mohamad	940	4.77	▲4.77
BERSAMA	Young Jie Yu	749	3.80	▲3.80
Total valid votes		19,698		
Total rejected ballots		201		
Unreturned ballots		206		
Turnout		19,925	72.88	▲6.57
Registered electors		27,339		
Majority		7,035	35.71	▲29.00
BN hold		Swing		
Source(s) https://electiondata.my/elections/mlk/SE-16/

Malacca state election, 2021
Party	Candidate	Votes	%	∆%
BN	Lim Ban Hong	5,028	38.49	▼2.39
PH	Gue Teck	4,152	31.78	▲31.78
PN	Bakri Jamaluddin	3,884	29.73	▲29.73
Total valid votes		13,064		
Total rejected ballots		140		
Unreturned ballots		43		
Turnout		13,247	66.31	▼18.28
Registered electors		19,976		
Majority		876	6.71	▲2.01
BN gain from PKR		Swing		?
Source(s) https://lom.agc.gov.my/ilims/upload/portal/akta/outputp/1715764/PUB%20583.pdf

Malacca state election, 2018
Party	Candidate	Votes	%	∆%
PKR	Gue Teck	7,648	45.58	▲45.58
BN	Lim Ban Hong	6,859	40.88	▼15.57
PAS	Mohd Syafiq Ismail	2,272	13.54	▲13.54
Total valid votes		16,779	100.00	
Total rejected ballots		233		
Unreturned ballots		47		
Turnout		17,059	84.59	▼2.57
Registered electors		20,166		
Majority		789	4.70	▼8.20
PKR gain from BN		Swing		?

Malacca state election, 2013
Party	Candidate	Votes	%	∆%
BN	Lim Ban Hong	9,171	56.45	▲0.94
DAP	Liou Chen Kuang	7,074	43.55	▼0.94
Total valid votes		16,245	100.00	
Total rejected ballots		384		
Unreturned ballots		0		
Turnout		16,629	87.16	▲9.23
Registered electors		19,078		
Majority		2,097	12.90	▲1.94
BN hold		Swing		
Source(s) "Federal Government Gazette - Notice of Contested Election, State Legislative Assembly for the State of Selangor [P.U. (B) 192/2013]" (PDF). Attorney General's Chambers of Malaysia. 26 April 2013. Archived from the original (PDF) on 2019-12-29. "Federal Government Gazette - Results of Contested Election and Statements of the Poll after the Official Addition of Votes, State Constituencies for the State of Selangor [P.U. (B) 233/2013]" (PDF). Attorney General's Chambers of Malaysia. 22 May 2013. Archived from the original (PDF) on 2018-10-02.

Malacca state election, 2008
Party	Candidate	Votes	%	∆%
BN	Seet Har Cheow	6,591	55.48	▼13.17
DAP	Koh Sze Choon	5,288	44.52	▲13.17
Total valid votes		11,879	100.00	
Total rejected ballots		700		
Unreturned ballots		62		
Turnout		12,641	77.93	▲0.25
Registered electors		16,222		
Majority		1,303	10.96	▼26.34
BN hold		Swing		

Malacca state election, 2004
Party	Candidate	Votes	%
BN	Seet Har Cheow	7,688	68.65
DAP	Koh Sze Choon	3,511	31.35
Total valid votes		11,199	100.00
Total rejected ballots		760	
Unreturned ballots		0	
Turnout		11,959	77.68
Registered electors		15,396	
Majority		4,177	37.30
This was a new constituency created.
