= Sungai Udang (state constituency) =

Constituency in Malacca, Malaysia

Sungai Udang (N11)
Malacca constituency

State constituency
- Legislature: Malacca State Legislative Assembly
MLA
Rais Yasin
BN
- Constituency created: 1974
- First contested: 1974
- Last contested: 2026

Demographics
- Electors (2026): 29,692

N11 Sungai Udang within Malacca, as used for the 2021 state election

Sungai Udang is a state constituency in Malacca, Malaysia, that has been represented in the Malacca State Legislative Assembly.

The state constituency was first contested in 1974 and is mandated to return a single Assemblyman to the Malacca State Legislative Assembly under the first-past-the-post voting system. Since 2021, the State Assemblyman for Sungai Udang is Mohd Aleef Yusof from Perikatan Nasional (PN).

== Definition ==
The Sungai Udang constituency contains the polling districts of Bukit Terendak, Pekan Sungai Udang, Paya Rumput Jaya and Bertam Hulu.

== Demographics ==
Ethnic breakdown of Sungai Udang's electorate as of 2026
1. Malays (77.9%)
2. Other Ethnicities (10.8%)
3. Chinese (8.60%)
4. Indians (2.70%)

== History ==
=== Polling districts ===
According to the gazette issued on 5 November 2026, the Sungai Udang constituency has a total of 4 polling districts.

State constituency	Polling districts	Code	Location
Sungai Udang（N11）	Bukit Terendak	136/11/01	SJK (C) Sungai Udang; SMK Sungai Udang
Sungai Udang（N11）	Pekan Sungai Udang	136/11/02	SK Sungai Udang
Sungai Udang（N11）	Paya Rumput Jaya	136/11/03	SRA (JAIM) Al Ahmdi
Sungai Udang（N11）	Bertam Hulu	136/11/04	SK Bertam Hulu

=== Representation history ===
Members of the Legislative Assembly for Sungai Udang
Assembly	No	Years	Member	Party
Constituency created from Bukit Rambai, Batu Berendam and Tanjong Kling
Sungei Udang
4th	N14	1974-1988	Ahmad Manap	BN (UMNO)
5th	N14	1978-1982	Abdul Rashid Othman	BN (UMNO)
6th	N14	1982-1986	Ahmad Nordin Mohd Amin	BN (UMNO)
Sungai Udang
7th	N12	1986-1990	Ahmad Nordin Md Amin	BN (UMNO)
8th	N12	1990-1995	Mohd Ali Rustam	BN (UMNO)
9th	N05	1995 – 1999	Noordin Yaani	BN (UMNO)
10th	N05	1999 – 2004	Ab Karim Sulaiman	BN (UMNO)
11th	N11	2004 – 2008	Yaakub Md Amin	BN (UMNO)
12th	N11	2008 – 2013	Yaakub Md Amin	BN (UMNO)
13th	N11	2013 – 2018	Idris Haron	BN (UMNO)
14th	N11	2018 – 2021	Idris Haron	BN (UMNO)
14th	N11	2021	Idris Haron	Independent
15th	N11	2021–2026	Mohd Aleef Yusof	PN (BERSATU)
16th	N11	2026 – present	Rais Yasin	BN (UMNO)

== Election results ==
Malacca state election, 2026
Party	Candidate	Votes	%	∆%
BN	Rais Yasin	18,317	84.25	▲44.01
BERSAMA	Mohd Ridzuan Abdul Rahman	2,103	9.67	▲9.67
BERSATU	Abdullah Mahadi	1,322	6.08	▲6.08
Total valid votes		21,742		
Total rejected ballots		437		
Unreturned ballots		16		
Turnout		22,195	74.75	▲4.60
Registered electors		29,692		
Majority		16,214	74.58	▲71.17
BN gain from PN		Swing		?
Source(s) https://electiondata.my/elections/mlk/SE-16/

Malacca state election, 2021
Party	Candidate	Votes	%	∆%
PN	Mohd Aleef Yusof	6,789	43.65	▲43.65
BN	Mohamad Ali Mohamad	6,259	40.24	▼15.98
PH	Hasmorni Tamby	2,035	13.08	▲13.08
Independent	Mohd Zahar Hashim	471	3.03	▲3.03
Total valid votes		15,554	100.00	
Total rejected ballots		409		
Unreturned ballots		27		
Turnout		15,990	70.15	▼10.15
Registered electors		22,793		
Majority		530	3.41	▼9.03
PN gain from BN		Swing		?
Source(s) https://lom.agc.gov.my/ilims/upload/portal/akta/outputp/1715764/PUB%20583.pdf

Malacca state election, 2018
Party	Candidate	Votes	%	∆%
BN	Idris Haron	10,073	56.22	▼23.92
PKR	Mohd Lokman Abdul Gani	7,844	43.78	▲23.92
Total valid votes		17,917	100.00	
Total rejected ballots		0		
Unreturned ballots		0		
Turnout		17,917	80.30	▼6.43
Registered electors		22,323		
Majority		2,229	12.44	▼47.84
BN hold		Swing		

Malacca state election, 2013
Party	Candidate	Votes	%	∆%
BN	Idris Haron	12,145	80.14	▼1.73
PKR	Asri Buang	3,009	19.86	▲1.73
Total valid votes		15,154	100.00	
Total rejected ballots		191		
Unreturned ballots		0		
Turnout		15,345	86.73	▲4.68
Registered electors		17,693		
Majority		9,136	60.28	▼3.46
BN hold		Swing		
Source(s) "Federal Government Gazette - Notice of Contested Election, State Legislative Assembly for the State of Selangor [P.U. (B) 192/2013]" (PDF). Attorney General's Chambers of Malaysia. 26 April 2013. "Federal Government Gazette - Results of Contested Election and Statements of the Poll after the Official Addition of Votes, State Constituencies for the State of Selangor [P.U. (B) 233/2013]" (PDF). Attorney General's Chambers of Malaysia. 22 May 2013.

Malacca state election, 2008
Party	Candidate	Votes	%	∆%
BN	Yaakub Md Amin	10,282	81.87	▲1.53
PKR	Zulkefly Othman	2,277	18.13	▼1.53
Total valid votes		12,559	100.00	
Total rejected ballots		663		
Unreturned ballots		935		
Turnout		14,157	91.41	▲10.34
Registered electors		15,488		
Majority		8,005	63.74	▲3.06
BN hold		Swing		

Malacca state election, 2004
Party	Candidate	Votes	%	∆%
BN	Yaakub Md Amin	8,543	80.34	▲17.67
PKR	Jamilludin Abdul Wahid	2,091	19.66	▲19.66
Total valid votes		10,634	100.00	
Total rejected ballots		122		
Unreturned ballots		0		
Turnout		10,756	81.07	
Registered electors		13,268		
Majority		6,452	60.68	
BN hold		Swing		

Malacca state election, 1999
Party	Candidate	Votes	%	∆%
BN	Ab Karim Sulaiman	6,409	62.67	▼22.14
PAS	Hassan Md. Dahan	3,817	37.33	▲22.14
Total valid votes		10,226	100.00	
Total rejected ballots		181		
Unreturned ballots		4,197		
Turnout		14,604	92.47	▲0.71
Registered electors		15,793		
Majority		2,592	25.35	▼44.28
BN hold		Swing		

Malacca state election, 1995
Party	Candidate	Votes	%	∆%
BN	Noordin Yaani	8,566	84.81	▲15.97
PAS	Othman Abdul Wahid	1,534	15.19	▲15.19
Total valid votes		10,100	100.00	
Total rejected ballots		315		
Unreturned ballots		1,379		
Turnout		11,794	91.76	▲14.08
Registered electors		12,853		
Majority		7,032	69.62	▲31.95
BN hold		Swing		

Malacca state election, 1990
Party	Candidate	Votes	%	∆%
BN	Mohd Ali Rustam	12,073	68.84	▼4.43
S46	Ahmad Nordin Mohd Amin	5,465	31.16	▲31.16
Total valid votes		17,538	100.00	
Total rejected ballots		1,121		
Unreturned ballots		0		
Turnout		18,659	77.68	▲7.69
Registered electors		24,021		
Majority		6,608	37.68	▼8.96
BN hold		Swing		

Malacca state election, 1986
Party	Candidate	Votes	%	∆%
BN	Ahmad Nordin Mohamad Amin	7,956	73.32	▼11.74
PAS	Hassan Md Dahan	2,895	26.68	▲11.74
Total valid votes		10,851	100.00	
Total rejected ballots		495		
Unreturned ballots		0		
Turnout		11,346	69.99	▼4.74
Registered electors		16,210		
Majority		5,061	46.64	▼23.47
BN hold		Swing		

Malacca state election, 1982: Sungei Udang
Party	Candidate	Votes	%	∆%
BN	Ahmad Nordin bin Mohd. Amin	6,085	85.06	▲33.89
PAS	Yaakop bin Abu Hassan	1,069	14.94	▼33.89
Total valid votes		7,154	100.00	
Total rejected ballots		270		
Unreturned ballots		0		
Turnout		7,424	74.73	▲1.15
Registered electors		9,934		
Majority		5,016	70.11	▲67.79
BN hold		Swing		

Malacca state election, 1978: Sungei Udang
Party	Candidate	Votes	%	∆%
BN	Ab. Rashid bin Othman	3,141	51.16	▼24.69
PAS	Yaakop bin Abu Hassan	2,998	48.84	▲48.84
Total valid votes		6,139	100.00	
Total rejected ballots		137		
Unreturned ballots		0		
Turnout		6,276	73.58	▼1.71
Registered electors		8,529		
Majority		143	2.33	▼49.37
BN hold		Swing		

Malacca state election, 1974: Sungei Udang
Party	Candidate	Votes	%
BN	Ahmad bin Manap	3,829	75.85
Parti Rakyat Malaysia	Koh Chan Bin	1,219	24.15
Total valid votes		5,048	100.00
Total rejected ballots		331	
Unreturned ballots		0	
Turnout		5,379	75.29
Registered electors		7,144	
Majority		2,610	51.70
This was a new constituency created.
