= Machap Baru =

Town in Malacca, Malaysia

Coordinates: 2°22′54.6″N 102°19′47.4″E

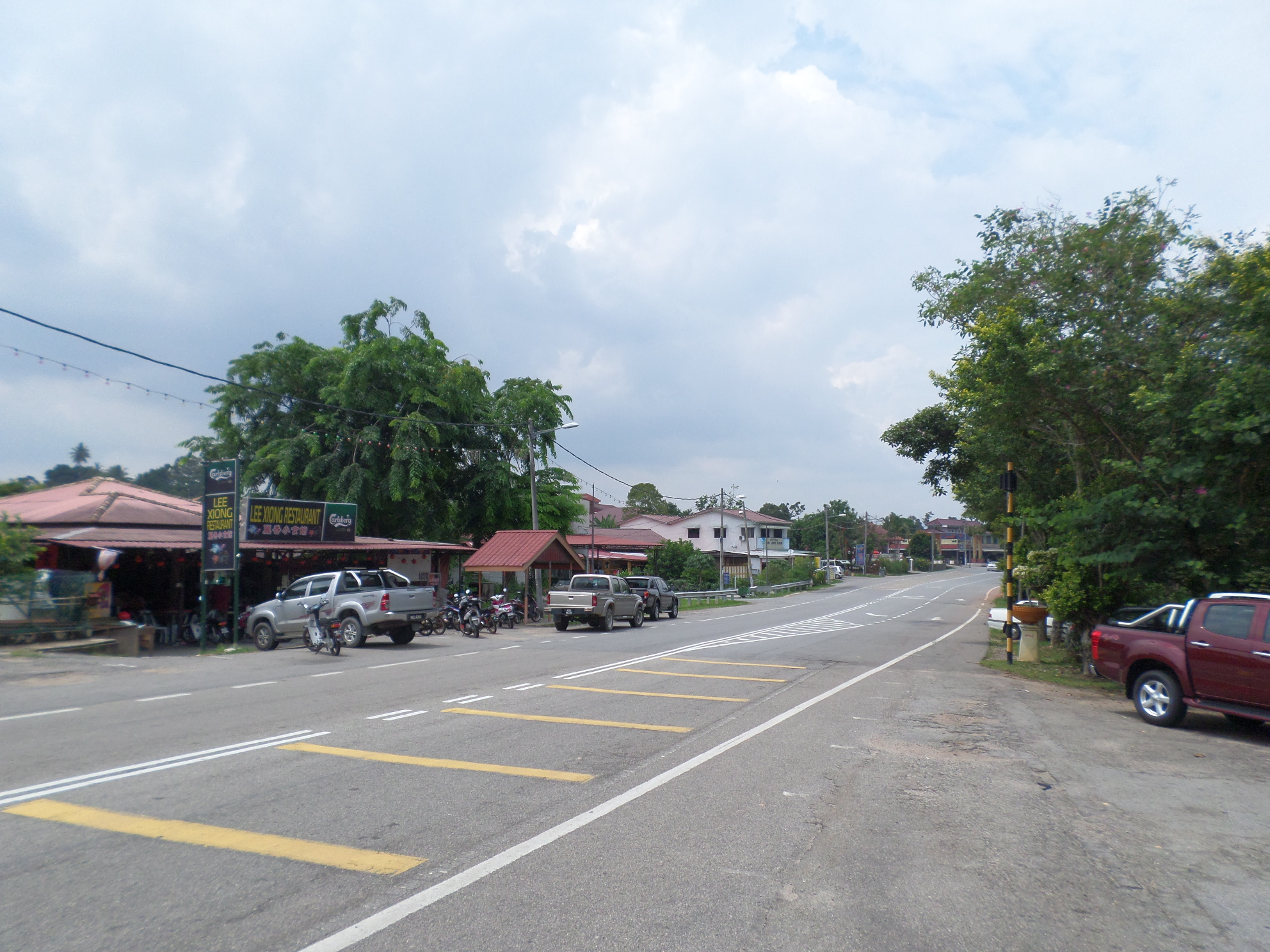
Machap Baru

Machap Baru, with an estimated population of 16,000, is a small town in Alor Gajah District, Malacca, Malaysia. Local restaurants, which serve exotic game, such as wild boar, deer, monitor lizards and snakes are often monitored by the Malaysian Wildlife and National Parks Department for involvement in illegal trading of endangered species.

== Infrastructure ==
- Datuk Wira Poh Ah Tiam Machap Recreational Park was opened in 2007.

== Notable residents ==
- Datuk Wira Poh Ah Tiam, senior Malaysian Chinese Association official and state assemblyman for Machap

== See also ==
- List of cities and towns in Malaysia by population
