= Machap Jaya (state constituency) =

State constituency in Malacca, Malaysia

Machap Jaya (N08)
Malacca constituency

State constituency
- Legislature: Malacca State Legislative Assembly
MLA
Ngwe Hee Sem
BN
- Constituency created: 2018
- First contested: 2018
- Last contested: 2026

Demographics
- Electors (2026): 16,030
- Area (km²): 161

N08 Machap Jaya within Malacca, as used for the 2021 state election

Machap Jaya is a state constituency in Malacca, Malaysia, that has been represented in the Melaka State Legislative Assembly.

The state constituency was first contested in 2018 and is mandated to return a single Assemblyman to the Melaka State Legislative Assembly under the first-past-the-post voting system. Since 2021, the State Assemblyman for Machap Jaya is Ngwe Hee Sem from the Malaysian Chinese Association (MCA), which is part of the state's ruling coalition, Barisan Nasional (BN).

The state constituency was first contested under the name of Machap but was renamed to Machap Jaya for the 2018 election.

== Definition ==
The Machap Jaya constituency contains the polling districts of Tebong, FELDA Hutan Percha, Kemuning, Solok Menggong, Machap Baru, Ayer Pasir, Machap Umbor and Melaka Pindah.

== Demographics ==
Ethnic breakdown of Machap Jaya's electorate as of 2026
1. Malay (47.0%)
2. Chinese (36.0%)
3. Indian (13.7%)
4. Other ethnicities (3.30%)

== History ==
=== Polling districts ===
According to the gazette issued on 5 November 2026, the Machap Jaya constituency has a total of 8 polling districts.

State constituency	Polling districts	Code	Location
Machap Jaya (N08)	Tebong	135/08/01	SJK (T) Pekan Tebong
Machap Jaya (N08)	FELDA Hutan Percha	135/08/02	SK Hutan Percha
Machap Jaya (N08)	Kemuning	135/08/03	SK Kemuning
Machap Jaya (N08)	Solok Mengong	135/08/04	SK Menggong
Machap Jaya (N08)	Machap Baru	135/08/05	SJK (C) Machap Baru
Machap Jaya (N08)	Ayer Pasir	135/08/06	SRA (JAIM) Kampung Ayer Pasir Machap
Machap Jaya (N08)	Machap Umbor	135/08/07	SJK (C) Machap Umboo
Machap Jaya (N08)	Melaka Pindah	135/08/08	SK Lesong Batu; SK Melaka Pindah

=== Representation history ===
Members of the Legislative Assembly for Machap Jaya
Assembly	No	Years	Member	Party
Constituency created, renamed from Machap
14th	N08	2018 – 2021	Ginie Lim Siew Lin (林秀凌)	PH (PKR)
15th	N08	2021 – 2026	Ngwe Hee Sem (魏喜森)	BN (MCA)
16th	N08	2026 – present	Ngwe Hee Sem (魏喜森)	BN (MCA)

== Election results ==
Malacca state election, 2026
Party	Candidate	Votes	%	∆%
BN	Ngwe Hee Sem	6,686	58.56	▲11.89
PH	Ginie Lim Siew Lin	4,450	38.98	▲4.04
BERSAMA	Prasanth Kumar Brakasam	281	2.46	▲2.46
Total valid votes		11,417		
Total rejected ballots		94		
Unreturned ballots		13		
Turnout		11,524	71.89	▲6.62
Registered electors		16,030		
Majority		2,236	19.58	▲7.85
BN hold		Swing		
Source(s) https://electiondata.my/elections/mlk/SE-16/

Malacca state election, 2021
Party	Candidate	Votes	%	∆%
BN	Ngwe Hee Sem	3,732	46.67	▲6.68
PH	Law Bing Haw	2,794	34.94	▲34.94
PN	Tai Siong Jiul	1,202	15.03	▲15.03
IMAN	Abdul Aziz Osani Kasim	167	2.09	▲2.09
Independent	Azlan Daud	101	1.26	▲1.26
Total valid votes		7,996		
Total rejected ballots		137		
Unreturned ballots		17		
Turnout		8,150	65.27	▼19.00
Registered electors		12,487		
Majority		938	11.73	▼0.94
BN gain from PKR		Swing		?
Source(s) https://lom.agc.gov.my/ilims/upload/portal/akta/outputp/1715764/PUB%20583.pdf

Malacca state election, 2018
Party	Candidate	Votes	%
PKR	Ginie Lim Siew Lin	5,550	52.66
BN	Koh Nai Kwong	4,214	39.99
PAS	Wan Zahidi Wan Ismail	775	7.35
Total valid votes		10,539	100.00
Total rejected ballots		145	
Unreturned ballots		34	
Turnout		10,718	84.27
Registered electors		12,719	
Majority		1,336	12.67
This was a new constituency created.
