= List of post-nominal letters (Malacca) =

Honorific order of the Sultanate of Malacca

This is a list of post-nominal letters used in Malacca. The order in which they follow an individual's name is the same as the order of precedence for the wearing of order insignias, decorations, and medals. When applicable, non-hereditary titles are indicated.

Grades		Post-nominal	Title	Wive's title	Ribbon
Premier and Faithful Exalted Order of Malacca - Darjah Seri Paduka Setia Melaka
Grand Principal	Darjah Seri Paduka Setia Melaka	S.P.S.M.	Seri Setia	--	
Premier and Exalted Order of Malacca - Darjah Utama Negeri Melaka
Grand Principal	Darjah Utama Negeri Melaka	D.U.N.M.	Datuk Seri Utama	Datin Seri Utama	
Exalted Order of Malacca - Darjah Seri Melaka
Grand Commander	Darjah Gemilang Seri Melaka	D.G.S.M.	Datuk Seri	Datin Seri	
Commander	Darjah Cemerlang Seri Melaka	D.C.S.M.	Datuk Wira	Datin Wira	
Companion	Darjah Mulia Seri Melaka	D.M.S.M.	Datuk	Datin	
Lieutenant	Darjah Pangkuan Seri Melaka	D.P.S.M.	Datuk	Datin	
Member	Darjah Seri Melaka	D.S.M.	--	--	
Distinguished Service Star - Bintang Cemerlang Melaka
Recipient	Bintang Cemerlang Melaka	B.C.M.	--	--	
Justice of the Peace - Jaksa Pendamai
Recipient	Jaksa Pendamai	J.P.	--	--	
Supreme Gallantry Star - Bintang Gagah Perkasa
Recipient	Bintang Gagah Perkasa	B.G.P.	--	--	
Commendable Service Star - Bintang Khidmat Terpuji
Recipient	Bintang Khidmat Terpuji	B.K.T.	--	--	
Brilliant Service Medal - Pingat Jasa Cemerlang
Recipient	Pingat Jasa Cemerlang	P.J.C.	--	--	
Meritorious Service Medal - Pingat Jasa Kebaktian
Recipient	Pingat Jasa Kebaktian	P.J.K.	--	--	
Government Service Medal - Pingat Bakti Masyarakat
Recipient	Pingat Bakti Masyarakat	P.B.M.	--	--	
Long Service Medal - Pingat Khidmat Lama
Recipient	Pingat Khidmat Lama	P.K.L.	--	--	

Precedence:

1.	Darjah Seri Paduka Setia Melaka	S.P.S.M.	Seri Setia
2.	Darjah Utama Negeri Melaka	D.U.N.M.	Datuk Seri Utama
3.	Darjah Gemilang Seri Melaka	D.G.S.M.	Datuk Seri
4.	Darjah Cemerlang Seri Melaka	D.C.S.M.	Datuk Wira
5.	Darjah Mulia Seri Melaka	D.M.S.M.	Datuk
6.	Darjah Pangkuan Seri Melaka	D.P.S.M.	Datuk
7.	Darjah Seri Melaka	D.S.M.	--
8.	Jaksa Pendamai	J.P.	--
9.	Bintang Cemerlang Melaka	B.C.M.	--
10.	Bintang Gagah Perkasa	B.G.P.	--
11.	Bintang Khidmat Terpuji	B.K.T.	--
12.	Pingat Jasa Cemerlang	P.J.C.	--
13.	Pingat Jasa Kebaktian	P.J.K.	--
14.	Pingat Bakti Masyarakat	P.B.M.	--
15.	Pingat Khidmat Lama	P.K.L.	--
16.	Pingat Pertabalan	P.P.	--

== See also ==
- Orders, decorations, and medals of the Malaysian states and federal territories#Malacca
- Order of precedence in Malacca
