= Norhizam Hassan Baktee =

Malaysian politician

Yang Berbahagia Datuk Norhizam Hassan Baktee DMSM
- نورهيزام بن حسن بقتي

Member of the Malacca State Executive Council
- In office 13 March 2020 – 4 October 2021
- Governor: Mohd Khalil Yaakob (2020); Mohd Ali Rustam (2020–2021)
- Chief Minister: Sulaiman Md Ali
- Portfolio: Agriculture, Agro-based Industry and Entrepreneur Development
- Preceded by: Himself
- Succeeded by: Ab Rauf Yusoh (Senior Member, Entrepreneur Development); Abdul Razak Abdul Rahman (Agriculture, Agro-based Industry and Entrepreneur Development)
- Constituency: Pengkalan Batu
- In office 16 May 2018 – 2 March 2020
- Governor: Mohd Khalil Yaakob
- Chief Minister: Adly Zahari
- Portfolio: Agriculture, Agro-based Industry and Entrepreneur Development
- Preceded by: Hassan Abdul Rahman
- Succeeded by: Himself
- Constituency: Pengkalan Batu

Member of the Malacca State Legislative Assembly for Pengkalan Batu
- In office 9 May 2018 – 20 November 2021
- Preceded by: Position established
- Succeeded by: Kalsom Noordin (BN–UMNO)
- Majority: 2,756 (2018)

Faction represented in Malacca State Legislative Assembly
- 2018–2020: Pakatan Harapan
- 2020–2021: Independent

Personal details
- Born: Norhizam bin Hassan Baktee; 23 May 1966 (age 60) Malacca, Malaysia
- Citizenship: Malaysian
- Party: United Malays National Organisation (UMNO) (–2006); Democratic Action Party (DAP) (2006–2020); Independent (2020–2024); Malaysian United Indigenous Party (BERSATU) (since 2024)
- Other political affiliations: Barisan Nasional (BN) (–2006); Pakatan Rakyat (PR) (2008–2015); Pakatan Harapan (PH) (2015–2020); Perikatan Nasional (PN) (since 2024)
- Education: SPM
- Profession: Professional Driver
- Other names: Hulk, Gangster, YB Viral
- Norhizam Hassan Baktee on Facebook

Norhizam bin Hassan Baktee is a Malaysian politician who served as Member of the Malacca State Executive Council (EXCO) in the Barisan Nasional (BN) state administration under former Chief Minister Sulaiman Md Ali from March 2020 to his resignation in October 2021 for the second term and in the Pakatan Harapan (PH) state administration under former Chief Minister Adly Zahari from May 2018 to the collapse of the PH state administration in March 2020 for the first term. as well as a Member of the Melaka State Legislative Assembly (MLA) for Pengkalan Batu from May 2018 to November 2021. He is a member of the Malaysian United Indigenous Party (BERSATU), a component party of the Perikatan Nasional (PN) coalition and was an independent and a member of the Democratic Action Party (DAP), a component party of the Pakatan Harapan (PH) coalition. He is also informally known by his nicknames such as Hulk or Gangster , for his temperamental mood and fondness of wearing body-fit shirts.

== Political career ==
Norhizam an ex-lorry driver, was a United Malays National Organisation (UMNO) of Pantai Peringgit branch before he quit in 2006 to join DAP as he felt that the UMNO is not a trustworthy and transparent party anymore and in following the footstep of his father; who contested twice in the 1980s elections as DAP candidate but had failed to win the seat known as Peringgit then which Norhizam himself redeemed and represented later after he was elected to Malacca State Legislative Assembly as a MLA for Pengkalan Batu constituency picked by DAP to contest in the 2018 Malacca state election and appointed as EXCO member after PH came into power as administration under Melaka PH Chairman Adly Zahari as Chief Minister in May 2018. He also been conferred the Malacca state "Datukship" title and award in 2019.

After the collapsed of PH state government following the so-called 'Sheraton Move' in 2020 Malaysian political crisis, Norhizam somehow withdrew support for PH and left DAP to be independent and defected to support BN-PN to form a new state government instead, allowing BN came into power again under Chief Minister Sulaiman Md Ali and he was reappointed EXCO member.

In October 2021, he and three other MLAs withdrew support for the BN government and it has again collapsed, triggering the snap 2021 Malacca state election. Norhizam after being rejected by PH to contest under its banner, decided to defend the seat as an independent candidate in the November state election. Failing to keep his seat, he only managed to garner 1,218 votes in the five-cornered fight won by BN's Kalsom Nordin.

On 23 October 2024, Norhizam announced his return to politics by joining BERSATU and participating in the BERSATU party elections, contesting for a position in the BERSATU Hang Tuah Jaya division.

== Controversies ==
In October 2018, Norhizam's rude manner and heated shouting argument including his arrogant outburst, "Siapa YB? Awak YB kah saya YB?" (Who's the assemblyman? You or me?) when he was engaging his constituents and villagers of Kampung Pulai Nibong who had brought up the issue about a road being closed was widely circulated online and caught social media attention. His remarks had caused netizens to criticise Norhizam as an unfit lawmaker and should be sacked.

Norhizam as the Agriculture, Agro-Based, Entrepreneur Development and Cooperative Committee EXCO had in September 2019 made an unproven assumption that the state was being invaded with Indonesian wild boars swam across the narrow Strait of Malacca from Sumatera which was refuted by Malaysian Nature Society (MNS). His in-doubt claims had caused infuriation from the neighbouring country and his obsession with the endangered animal even led him to set-up a task force to eradicate them which had earned him the 'Pig Shooting Champ' title in jest.

He called Low Chee Leong, MLA for Kota Laksamana "babi" (pig), "bodoh" (stupid) and "bangang" (idiot) in the state assembly sitting in May 2020. Both of them were formerly MLAs from DAP before Norhizam turn independent supporting the opposing political coalition.

On 13 October 2021, Malacca police seized his official car after his refusal to return it following his termination as EXCO member due to the dissolution of the state assembly on 4 October 2021.

== Personal life ==
He has been married with Norlishah Ibrahim and has two children.

== Election results ==
Malacca State Legislative Assembly
Year	Constituency	Candidate	Votes	Pct	Opponent(s)	Votes	Pct	Ballots cast	Majority	Turnout
2018	N15 Pengkalan Batu	Norhizam Hassan Baktee (DAP)	9,227	51.47%	Chua Lian Chye (Gerakan)	6,471	36.09%	18,272	2,756	86.26%
2018	N15 Pengkalan Batu	Norhizam Hassan Baktee (DAP)	9,227	51.47%	Ramli Dalip (PAS)	2,230	12.44%	18,272	2,756	86.26%
2021	N15 Pengkalan Batu	Norhizam Hassan Baktee (IND)	1,218	9.06%	Kalsom Noordin (UMNO)	4,839	35.99%	13,446	131	64.59%
2021	N15 Pengkalan Batu	Norhizam Hassan Baktee (IND)	1,218	9.06%	Muhamad Danish Zainudin (DAP)	4,708	35.01%	13,446	131	64.59%
2021	N15 Pengkalan Batu	Norhizam Hassan Baktee (IND)	1,218	9.06%	Mohd Azrudin Md Idris (BERSATU)	2,681	19.94%	13,446	131	64.59%
2021	N15 Pengkalan Batu	Norhizam Hassan Baktee (IND)	1,218	9.06%	Mohd Aluwi Sari (PUTRA)	82	0.61%	13,446	131	64.59%
2026	N15 Pengkalan Batu	Norhizam Hassan Baktee (BERSATU)	876	4.66%	Siti Aisyah Mahmood (UMNO)	11,836	62.93%	18,808	6,358	73.30%
2026	N15 Pengkalan Batu	Norhizam Hassan Baktee (BERSATU)	876	4.66%	Jason Tze-Xi Nathan (DAP)	5,478	29.13%	18,808	6,358	73.30%
2026	N15 Pengkalan Batu	Norhizam Hassan Baktee (BERSATU)	876	4.66%	Goh Han Koon (BERSAMA)	618	3.29%	18,808	6,358	73.30%

== Honours ==
=== Honours of Malaysia ===
- Malacca
  - Companion Class I of the Exalted Order of Malacca (DMSM) – Datuk (2019)
