= Adam Adli =

Malaysian politician and activist

Yang Berhormat Tuan Adam Adli Abd Halim MP
- آدم عدلي عبدالحليم
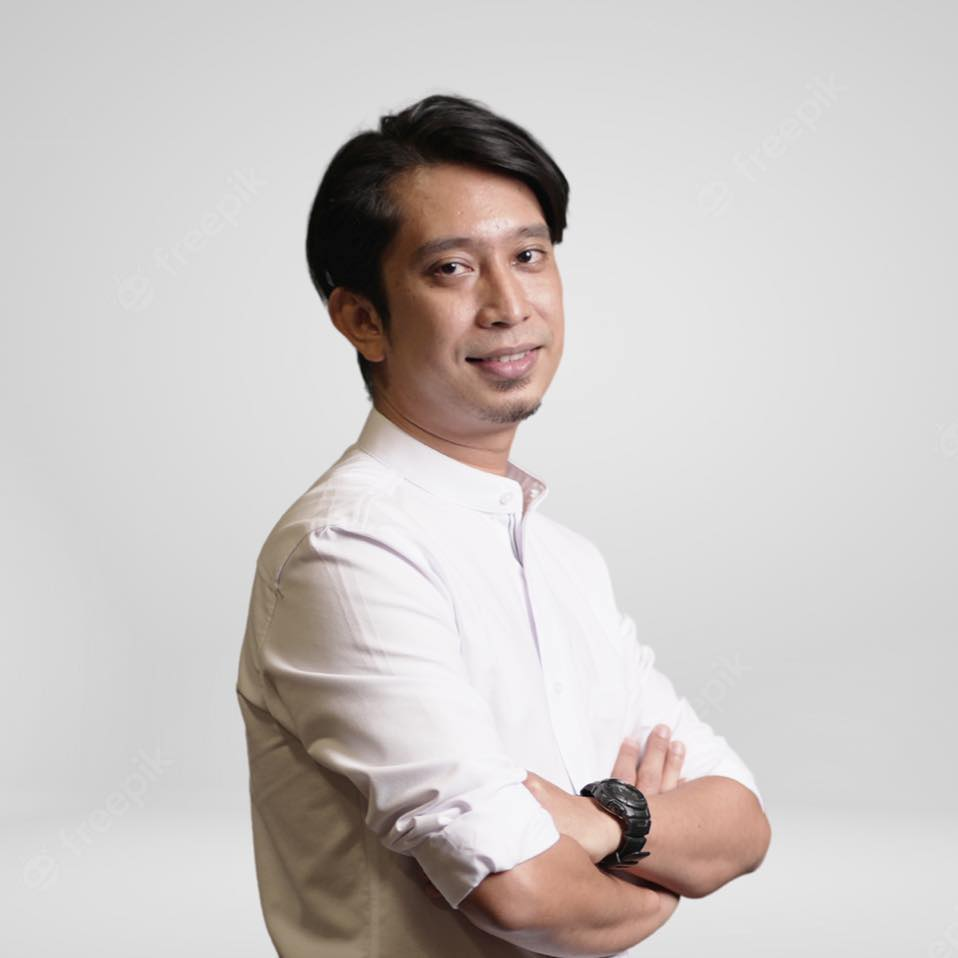

Deputy Minister of Higher Education
- Incumbent
- Assumed office 16 December 2025
- Monarchs: Abdullah (2022–2024); Ibrahim (2024–present)
- Prime Minister: Anwar Ibrahim
- Minister: Zambry Abdul Kadir
- Preceded by: Mustapha Sakmud
- Constituency: Hang Tuah Jaya

Deputy Minister of Youth and Sports
- In office 3 December 2022 – 16 December 2025
- Monarchs: Ibrahim (2024–present)
- Prime Minister: Anwar Ibrahim
- Minister: Hannah Yeoh
- Preceded by: Dato' Sri Ti Lian Ker
- Constituency: Hang Tuah Jaya

Member of the Malaysian Parliament for Hang Tuah Jaya
- Incumbent
- Assumed office 19 November 2022
- Prime Minister: Anwar Ibrahim
- Preceded by: Shamsul Iskandar Mohd Akin (PH–PKR)
- Majority: 8,638 (2022)

5th Youth Chief of the People's Justice Party
- In office 17 July 2022 – 23 May 2025
- President: Anwar Ibrahim
- Deputy: Muhammad Kamil Abdul Munim
- Preceded by: Akmal Nasrullah Mohd Nasir
- Succeeded by: Muhammad Kamil Abdul Munim

Deputy Youth Chief of Pakatan Harapan
- Incumbent
- Assumed office 29 July 2022 Serving with Mohd Hasbie Muda & Nurthaqaffah Nordin & Felix Joseph Saang
- President: Wan Azizah Wan Ismail
- Chairman: Anwar Ibrahim
- Youth Chief: Kelvin Yii Lee Wuen (2022–2025); Woo Kah Leong (2025–present)

Personal details
- Born: Adam Adli bin Abd Halim; 3 July 1989 (age 37) Butterworth, Seberang Perai, Penang, Malaysia
- Citizenship: Malaysia
- Party: People's Justice Party (PKR) (2021–present)
- Other political affiliations: Pakatan Harapan (PH) (2021–present)
- Spouse: Nor Zafirah Mohamad Jamil
- Children: 2
- Education: Sultan Idris Education University
- Occupation: Politician, activist

Adam Adli bin Abd Halim (Jawi: آدم عدلي بن عبد الحليم; Born 3 July 1989) is a Malaysian politician and former student activist who has served as the Deputy Minister of Higher Education in the Unity Government administration under Prime Minister Anwar Ibrahim since December 2025. He previously served as the Deputy Minister of Youth and Sports from 2023 to 2025. He has been the Member of Parliament for Hang Tuah Jaya since November 2022.

Adam Adli is a member of the People's Justice Party (PKR), a component party of the Pakatan Harapan (PH) coalition. He currently serves on the Central Leadership Council of PKR, is the party's Communications Director, and holds the position of Acting Chair of the PKR Melaka State Leadership Council (MPN). He also served as the 5th Youth Chief of PKR from July 2022 to May 2025.

== Early life and education ==
Adli studied at the Sultan Idris Education University. On 9 January 2013, Adli was suspended for three semesters, which ended in September for allegedly tarnishing the university's name and disturbing public peace and safety.

== Political career ==
On 16 September 2021, Adam Adli officially joined the People's Justice Party, along with 20 other young activists and student leaders, including lawyer Asheeq Ali, and activist Sarah Hadi. After the 2022 People's Justice Party leadership elections, he was elected as youth chief for the party for the 2022-2026 term.

== Legal Battle ==
=== Sedition charges ===
On 13 May 2013, Adam Adli was arrested over the statements he made during a forum held at the Kuala Lumpur and Selangor Chinese Assembly Hall in Kuala Lumpur. He was arrested at 3:15 PM on 18 May 2013 under Section 4(1) of the Sedition Act. Adli was handcuffed at his office in Bangsar will be charged with sedition and is being investigated under Section 125b of the Penal Code, for acting in a manner detrimental to Malaysia's parliamentary democracy.

On 19 May 2013, Adli was remanded by the Malaysian authorities for five days until 23 May following his arrest for sedition. City police chief Deputy Comm Datuk Mohmad Salleh said the remand order was to help police investigate Adam Adli on statements he made during a 13 May forum.

Adam Adli was charged under Section 4 of the Sedition Act on 23 May 2013 in Kuala Lumpur.

On 22 February 2018, Adam Adli was acquitted of his sedition charge. The judge stated that "the conviction was unsafe due to several misdirections in law", during the Sessions and High Courts verdicts. With him being a free man, Adam Adli continued his studies at the Sultan Idris Education University.

== Election results ==
Parliament of Malaysia
Year	Constituency	Candidate	Votes	Pct	Opponent(s)	Votes	Pct	Ballots cast	Majority	Turnout
2022	P137 Hang Tuah Jaya	Adam Adli Abd Halim (PKR)	39,418	41.72%	Mohd Ridhwan Mohd Ali (UMNO)	30,780	32.58%	94,486	8,638	79.74%
2022	P137 Hang Tuah Jaya	Adam Adli Abd Halim (PKR)	39,418	41.72%	Mohd Azrudin Md Idris (BERSATU)	23,549	24.92%	94,486	8,638	79.74%
2022	P137 Hang Tuah Jaya	Adam Adli Abd Halim (PKR)	39,418	41.72%	Sheikh Ikhzan Sheikh Salleh (PEJUANG)	739	0.78%	94,486	8,638	79.74%

== Honours ==
=== Honours of Malaysia ===
- Malaysia
  - Recipient of the 17th Yang di-Pertuan Agong Installation Medal (2024)
