= Deputy Minister of Higher Education (Malaysia) =

Malaysia government deputy minister

- Timbalan Menteri Pendidikan Tinggi
- Coat of Arms of Government of Malaysia

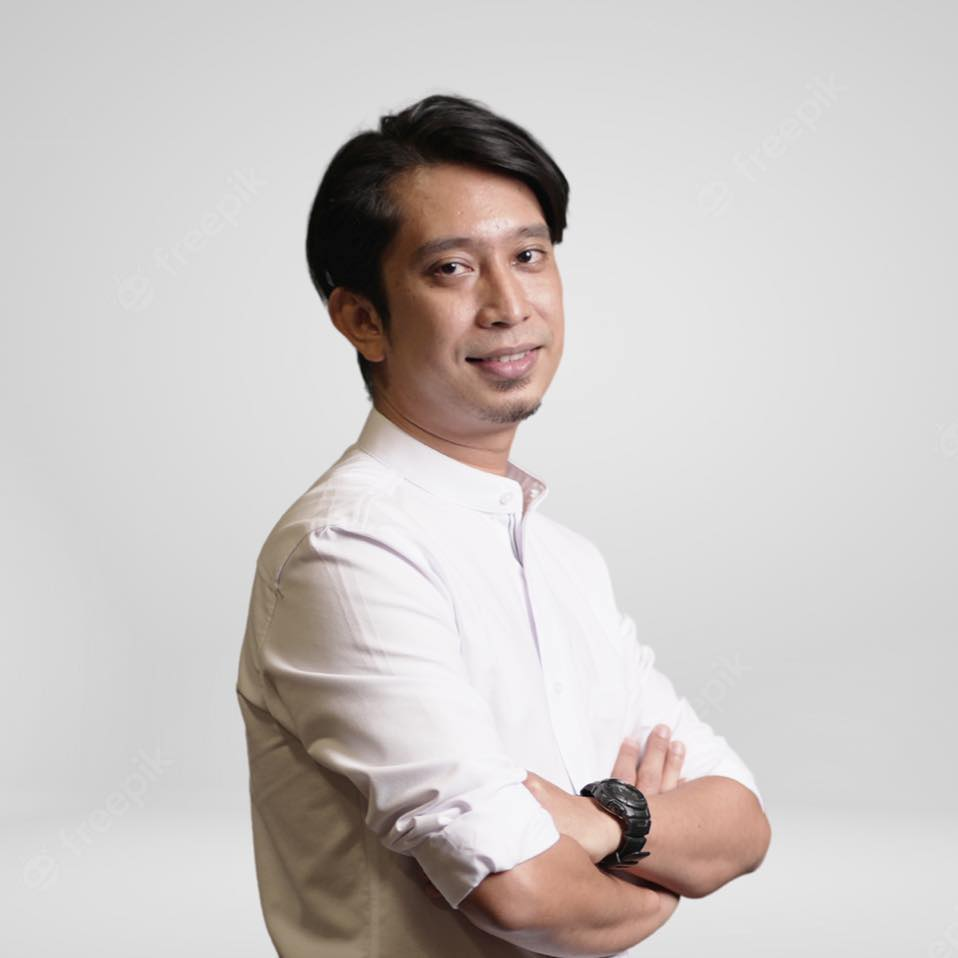
- Incumbent; Adam Adli Abd Halim since 17 December 2025
- Ministry of Higher Education
- Style: Higher Education Deputy Minister (informal); Yang Berhormat; The Honourable (within Malaysia)
- Reports to: Prime Minister of Malaysia; Minister of Higher Education of Malaysia
- Seat: Putrajaya, Malaysia
- Nominator: Prime Minister of Malaysia
- Appointer: The Yang di-Pertuan Agong on advice of the Prime Minister
- Term length: No fixed term
- Formation: 2004
- First holder: Fu Ah Kiow
- Website: www.mohe.gov.my

The Deputy Minister of Higher Education is a non-Malaysian cabinet position serving as deputy head of the Ministry of Higher Education.

== List of deputy ministers ==
The following individuals have been appointed as Deputy Minister of Higher Education, or any of its precedent titles:

Colour key (for political coalition/parties):

Coalition	Member party	Timeline
Barisan Nasional (BN)	Malaysian Chinese Association (MCA)	1973–present
Barisan Nasional (BN)	United Malays National Organisation (UMNO)	1973–present
Barisan Nasional (BN)	United Sabah Party (PBS)	2015–2018
Perikatan Nasional (PN)	Malaysian United Indigenous Party (BERSATU)	2020–present
–	Heritage Party (WARISAN)	
Pakatan Harapan (PH)	People's Justice Party (PKR)	2015–present

=== Deputy Minister of Higher Education (2004–present) ===
Portrait	Name (Birth–Death) Constituency	Political coalition	Political party	Took office	Left office	Prime Minister (Cabinet)
	Fu Ah Kiow (b. 1949); MP for Kuantan	BN	MCA	27 March 2004	14 February 2006	Abdullah Ahmad Badawi (II)
	Ong Tee Keat (b. 1957); MP for Pandan	BN	MCA	14 February 2006	18 March 2008	Abdullah Ahmad Badawi (II)
	Idris Haron (b. 1966); MP for Tangga Batu	BN	UMNO	19 March 2008	9 April 2009	Abdullah Ahmad Badawi (III)
	Hou Kok Chung (b. 1963); MP for Kluang	BN	MCA	19 March 2008	15 May 2013	Abdullah Ahmad Badawi (III); Mohd Najib Abdul Razak (I)
	Saifuddin Abdullah (b. 1961); MP for Temerloh	BN	UMNO	10 April 2009	15 May 2013	Mohd Najib Abdul Razak (I)
	Mary Yap (b. 1957); MP for Tawau	BN	PBS	29 July 2015	9 May 2018	Mohd Najib Abdul Razak (II)
	Mansor Othman (b.1950); MP for Nibong Tebal	PN	BERSATU	10 March 2020	16 August 2021	Muhyiddin Yassin (I)
	Ahmad Masrizal Muhammad (b. Unknown); Senator	BN	UMNO	30 August 2021	24 November 2022	Ismail Sabri Yaakob (I)
	Mohammad Yusof Apdal (b.1960); MP for Lahad Datu	–	WARISAN	10 December 2022	12 December 2023	Anwar Ibrahim (I)
	Mustapha Sakmud (b.1968); MP for Sepanggar	PH	PKR	12 December 2023	17 December 2025	Anwar Ibrahim (I)
	Adam Adli Abdul Halim (b.1989); MP for Hang Tuah Jaya	PH	PKR	17 December 2025	Incumbent	Anwar Ibrahim (I)

== See also ==
- Minister of Higher Education (Malaysia)
