= Kalsom Noordin =

Malaysian politician (born 1953)

Yang Berbahagia Datuk Kalsom Noordin DPSM BCM JP MLA
- کلثوم نوردين

Member of the Malacca State Executive Council (Women Affairs, Family Development and Welfare: 26 November 2021–31 March 2023 & Women, Family and Community Development: since 5 April 2023)
- Incumbent
- Assumed office 5 April 2023
- Governor: Mohd Ali Rustam
- Chief Minister: Ab Rauf Yusoh
- Deputy: Leng Chau Yen
- Preceded by: Herself (Family Development); Portfolios established (Women and Community Development)
- Constituency: Pengkalan Batu
- In office 26 November 2021 – 31 March 2023
- Governor: Mohd Ali Rustam
- Chief Minister: Sulaiman Md Ali
- Preceded by: Latipah Omar
- Succeeded by: Herself (Family Development); Portfolios abolished (Women Affairs and Welfare)
- Constituency: Pengkalan Batu

Member of the Malacca State Legislative Assembly for Pengkalan Batu
- In office 20 November 2021 – 14 November 2026
- Preceded by: Norhizam Hassan Baktee (PH–DAP)
- Majority: 131 (2021)

Faction represented in the Malacca State Legislative Assembly
- 2021–: Barisan Nasional

Personal details
- Born: 21 March 1953 (age 73) Malacca, Federation of Malaya
- Citizenship: Malaysian
- Party: United Malays National Organisation (UMNO)
- Other political affiliations: Barisan Nasional (BN)
- Occupation: Politician
- Profession: Businesswoman

Kalsom binti Noordin (born 21 March 1953) is a Malaysian politician who has served as Member of the Malacca State Executive Council (EXCO) in the Barisan Nasional (BN) state administration under Chief Minister Ab Rauf Yusoh since April 2023 for the second term and under former Chief Minister Sulaiman Md Ali from November 2021 to March 2023, as well as the Member of the Malacca State Legislative Assembly (MLA) for Pengkalan Batu since November 2021. She is a member, State Women's Chief of Malacca and the Women's Division Chief of Hang Tuah Jaya of the United Malays National Organisation (UMNO), a component party of the BN coalition. She is also the sole female EXCO member.

== Election results ==
Malacca State Legislative Assembly
Year	Constituency	Candidate	Votes	Pct	Opponent(s)	Votes	Pct	Ballots cast	Majority	Turnout
2021	N15 Pengkalan Batu	Kalsom Noordin (UMNO)	4,839	35.99%	Muhamad Danish Zainudin (DAP)	4,708	35.01%	13,446	131	64.59%
2021	N15 Pengkalan Batu	Kalsom Noordin (UMNO)	4,839	35.99%	Mohd Azrudin Md Idris (BERSATU)	2,681	19.94%	13,446	131	64.59%
2021	N15 Pengkalan Batu	Kalsom Noordin (UMNO)	4,839	35.99%	Norhizam Hassan Baktee (IND)	1,218	9.06%	13,446	131	64.59%
2021	N15 Pengkalan Batu	Kalsom Noordin (UMNO)	4,839	35.99%	Mohd Aluwi Sari (PUTRA)	82	0.61%	13,446	131	64.59%

== Honours ==
- Malacca
  - Lieutenant of the Exalted Order of Malacca (DPSM) – Datuk (2016)
  - Recipient of the Distinguished Service Star (BCM) (2010)
  - Justice of the Peace (JP) (2012)
