= Shamsul Iskandar Mohd Akin =

Malaysian politician

Yang Berbahagia Datuk Seri Shamsul Iskandar Mohd Akin DGSM
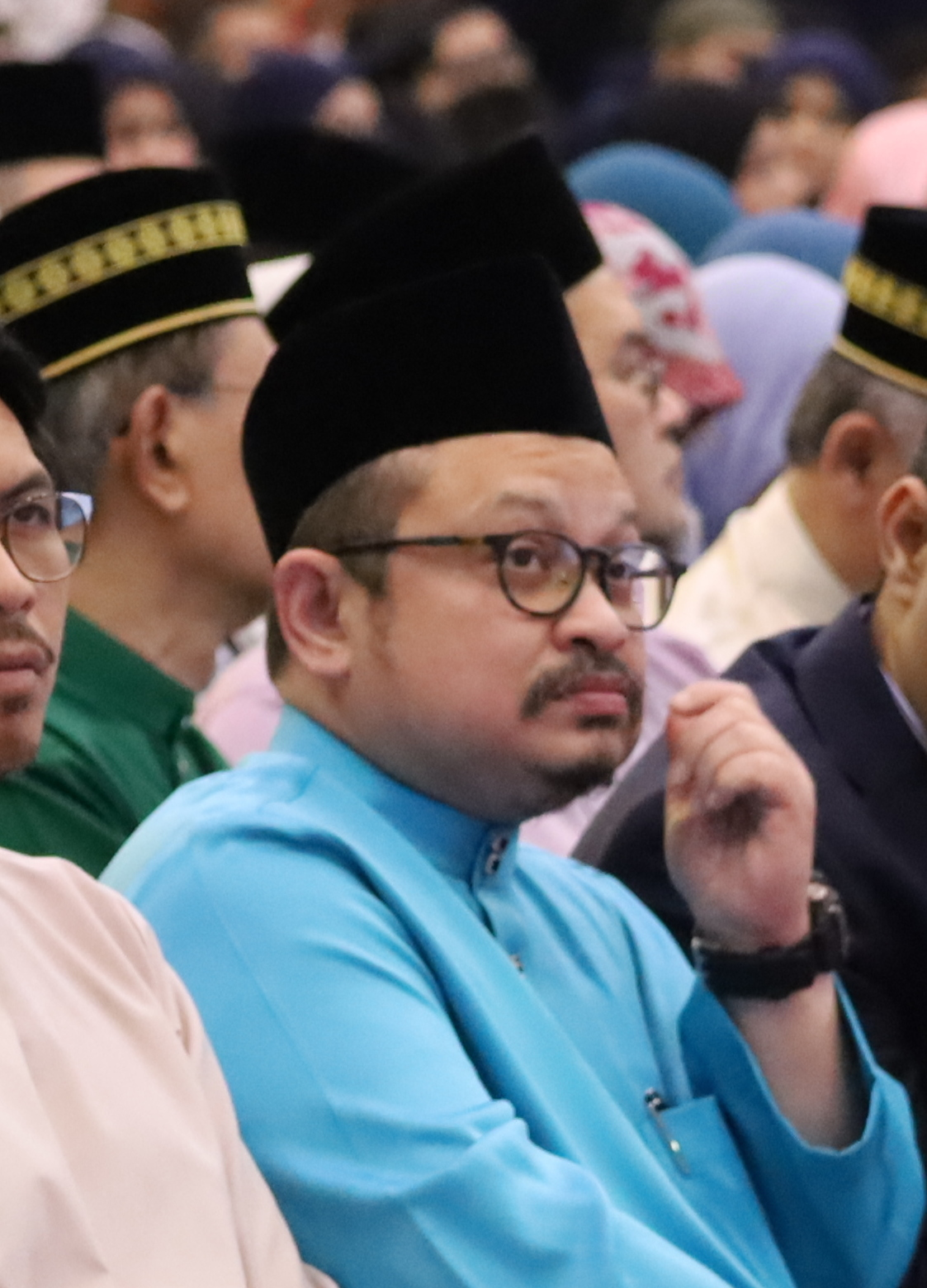
- Shamsul Iskandar in 2025

Senior Political Secretary to the Prime Minister
- In office 23 December 2022 – 25 November 2025
- Monarchs: Abdullah; Ibrahim Iskandar
- Prime Minister: Anwar Ibrahim
- Political Secretary: Chan Ming Kai; Ahmad Farhan Fauzi; Azman Abidin
- Preceded by: Syed Mohd Fahmi Sayid Mohammad (Political Secretary to the Prime Minister)
- Succeeded by: Tengku Zafrul Aziz (Senior Political Advisor to the Prime Minister)

Deputy Minister of Primary Industries
- In office 2 July 2018 – 24 February 2020
- Monarchs: Muhammad V (2018–2019); Abdullah (2019–2020)
- Prime Minister: Mahathir Mohamad
- Minister: Teresa Kok Suh Sim
- Preceded by: Datu Nasrun Datu Mansur (Deputy Minister of Plantation Industries and Commodities)
- Succeeded by: Wee Jeck Seng (Deputy Minister of Plantation Industries and Commodities I); Willie Mongin (Deputy Minister of Plantation Industries and Commodities II)
- Constituency: Hang Tuah Jaya

Vice President of the People's Justice Party
- In office 22 August 2014 – 16 November 2018
- President: Wan Azizah Wan Ismail

2nd Youth Chief of the People's Justice Party
- In office 2007–2014
- President: Wan Azizah Wan Ismail
- Preceded by: Mohamad Ezam Mohd Nor
- Succeeded by: Nik Nazmi Nik Ahmad

Member of the Malaysian Parliament for Hang Tuah Jaya
- In office 9 May 2018 – 19 November 2022
- Preceded by: Position established
- Succeeded by: Adam Adli (PH–PKR)
- Majority: 8,640 (2018)

Member of the Malaysian Parliament for Bukit Katil
- In office 5 May 2013 – 9 May 2018
- Preceded by: Md Sirat Abu (BN–UMNO)
- Succeeded by: Position abolished
- Majority: 5,733 (2013)

Faction represented in Dewan Rakyat
- 2013–2018: People's Justice Party
- 2018–2022: Pakatan Harapan

Personal details
- Born: Shamsul Iskandar @ Yusre bin Mohd Akin; 29 December 1974 (age 51) Malacca General Hospital, Malacca, Malaysia
- Party: National Justice Party (keADILan); People's Justice Party (PKR)
- Other political affiliations: Barisan Alternatif (BA) (1999–2004); Pakatan Rakyat (PR) (2008–2015); Pakatan Harapan (PH) (since 2015)
- Spouse: Norzakiah Mohd Tahir
- Children: 3
- Education: Kolej Islam Sultan Alam Shah
- Alma mater: International Islamic University Malaysia (LLB)
- Occupation: Politician
- Website: shamsuliskandar.wordpress.com
- Shamsul Iskandar Mohd Akin on Facebook

Shamsul Iskandar @ Yusre bin Mohd Akin (Jawi: شمس الإسكندر @ يسري بن محمد عقين; born 29 December 1974) is a Malaysian politician who served as Senior Political Secretary to Prime Minister Anwar Ibrahim from December 2022 to his resignation in November 2025. He served as the Deputy Minister of Primary Industries in the Pakatan Harapan (PH) administration under former Prime Minister Mahathir Mohamad and former Minister Teresa Kok Suh Sim from July 2018 to the collapse of the PH administration in February 2020 and the Member of Parliament (MP) for Hang Tuah Jaya from May 2018 to November 2022 and for Bukit Katil from May 2013 to May 2018. He is a member and was Information Chief, Spokesperson as well as vice-president of the People's Justice Party (PKR), a component party of the PH coalition.

== Early life and education ==
For his primary education, Shamsul Iskandar went to Sekolah Kebangsaan Kesang Tua. He received his secondary education at Sekolah Menengah Kebangsaan Agama Sultan Muhammad, Melaka before later finishing his Upper Secondary at Sultan Alam Shah Islamic College (KISAS). He is a King Scout. He obtained his law degree in International Islamic University Malaysia.

== Political career ==
In 2007, he became the Chief of PKR's youth wing after the leader, Mohamad Ezam Mohd Nor, left the post in 2006, and he defeated Hasmi Hashim in the 2007 election to replace him.

In 2004 election, he contested the newly created Tangga Batu parliamentary constituency in his home state, Malacca but lost to Idris Haron. Then in the 2008 election, he contested and lost the Dungun parliamentary seat in Terengganu. He was finally elected to federal Parliament in the 2013 election for the seat of Bukit Katil, defeating heavyweight opponent, the Chief Minister of Melaka, Mohd Ali Rustam. In the 2018 election, he managed to retain his Bukit Katil which had change to Hang Tuah Jaya after the 2018 re-delineation but lost the Rim seat of the Malacca State Legislative Assembly.

In 2014 he was elected a vice-president of PKR, alongside Rafizi Ramli, Nurul Izzah Anwar and Tian Chua. He did not re-contest the leadership of PKR's youth wing.

On 11 December 2013 Shamsul Iskandar was charged with being responsible for Malaysia's Post General Election rally 2013 or "Blackout 505", a rally that was held in a restricted area at the compound of University of Malaysia's Ar-Rahman Mosque which happened across 15 cities in Malaysia. After five years he was acquitted on 16 May 2018 and all charges were dropped on grounds that prosecutor failed to prove the case against Shamsul beyond reasonable doubt.

Following the victory of Pakatan Harapan in 14th General Election, he was appointed as the Member of Cabinet assuming the role of Deputy Minister of Primary Industries under the new government led by Prime Minister, Tun Dr Mahathir Mohamad.

At the international level, Shamsul Iskandar is also a board member of The Parliamentary Network on the World Bank & International Monetary Fund.

In the 15th General Election, Shamsul Iskandar challenge Ahmad Zahid Hamidi for the Bagan Datuk parliamentary seat. He lost and later claimed he were advised against doing recount in order to allow unity government to form.

== Controversies and issues ==
=== Corruption charges ===
In November 2025, a businessman Albet Tei released a video saying he have bribe Shamsul thru a middlemen Sofia Rini. Shamsul resigned from his position as Senior Political Secretary for the Prime Minister several days later and were arrested by SPRM to give further information.

In December 2025, he were charged with four corruption charges in connection with mineral exploration license in Sabah along with Tei. He were accused of accepting RM 100,000 bribes in cash from businessman Albert Tei in November 2023 and RM 40,000 in cash in January 2024. He were further accused of accepting bribes in form of furniture and electrical items between February and March 2024.

== Personal life ==
Shamsul Iskandar is married to Norzakiah Mohd Tahir and they have three children.

== Election results ==
Parliament of Malaysia
Year	Constituency	Candidate	Votes	Pct	Opponent(s)	Votes	Pct	Ballots cast	Majority	Turnout
2004	P136 Tangga Batu	Shamsul Iskandar Mohd Akin (PKR)	7,522	20.64%	Idris Haron (UMNO)	26,766	79.36%	42,965	24,444	80.62%
2008	P039 Dungun	Shamsul Iskandar Mohd Akin (PKR)	24,270	45.34%	Matulidi Jusoh (UMNO)	29,264	54.66%	54,464	4,994	83.98%
2013	P137 Bukit Katil	Shamsul Iskandar Mohd Akin (PKR)	46,167	53.30%	Mohd Ali Rustam (UMNO)	40,720	46.70%	88,271	5,733	88.77%
2018	P137 Hang Tuah Jaya	Shamsul Iskandar Mohd Akin (PKR)	39,067	51.01%	Mohd Ali Rustam (UMNO)	30,427	39.73%	76,583	8,640	86.72%
2018	P137 Hang Tuah Jaya	Shamsul Iskandar Mohd Akin (PKR)	39,067	51.01%	Md Khalid Kassim (PAS)	7,089	9.26%	76,583	8,640	86.72%
2022	P075 Bagan Datuk	Shamsul Iskandar Mohd Akin (PKR)	16,230	38.78%	Ahmad Zahid Hamidi (UMNO)	16,578	39.61%	41,856	348	71.94%
2022	P075 Bagan Datuk	Shamsul Iskandar Mohd Akin (PKR)	16,230	38.78%	Muhammad Faiz Na'aman (BERSATU)	8,822	21.08%	41,856	348	71.94%
2022	P075 Bagan Datuk	Shamsul Iskandar Mohd Akin (PKR)	16,230	38.78%	Tawfik Ismail (IND)	226	0.54%	41,856	348	71.94%

Malacca State Legislative Assembly
Year	Constituency	Candidate	Votes	Pct	Opponent(s)	Votes	Pct	Ballots cast	Majority	Turnout
2018	N25 Rim	Shamsul Iskandar Mohd Akin (PKR)	4,765	42.06%	Ghazale Muhamad (UMNO)	5,301	46.80%	11,525	536	84.20%
2018	N25 Rim	Shamsul Iskandar Mohd Akin (PKR)	4,765	42.06%	Kintan Man (PAS)	1,262	11.14%	11,525	536	84.20%
2021	N13 Paya Rumput	Shamsul Iskandar Mohd Akin (PKR)	6,201	36.03%	Rais Yasin (UMNO)	6,830	39.68%	17,211	629	65.06%
2021	N13 Paya Rumput	Shamsul Iskandar Mohd Akin (PKR)	6,201	36.03%	Muhammad Fariz Izwan Mazlan (BERSATU)	3,972	23.08%	17,211	629	65.06%
2021	N13 Paya Rumput	Shamsul Iskandar Mohd Akin (PKR)	6,201	36.03%	Mohd Jaini Dimon (IND)	127	0.74%	17,211	629	65.06%
2021	N13 Paya Rumput	Shamsul Iskandar Mohd Akin (PKR)	6,201	36.03%	Muhammad Hashidi Mohd Zin (PUTRA)	81	0.47%	17,211	629	65.06%

== Honours ==
=== Honours of Malaysia ===
- Malacca
  - Grand Commander of the Exalted Order of Malacca (DGSM) – Datuk Seri (2018)

== See also ==
- Tangga Batu (federal constituency)
- Dungun (federal constituency)
- Bukit Katil (federal constituency)
