= Azman Abidin =

Malaysian politician

Yang Berbahagia Datuk Azman Abidin DMSM

Political Secretary to the Prime Minister
- Incumbent
- Assumed office 23 December 2022 Serving with Chan Ming Kai & Ahmad Farhan Fauzi
- Monarchs: Abdullah; Ibrahim Iskandar
- Prime Minister: Anwar Ibrahim
- Senior Political Secretary: Shamsul Iskandar Mohd Akin

State Chairman of the People's Justice Party of Federal Territories
- Incumbent
- Assumed office 26 May 2024
- President: Anwar Ibrahim
- State Deputy Chairman: Jayakumar Muniandy
- Preceded by: Rafizi Ramli

State Deputy Chairman of the Pakatan Harapan of Federal Territories
- Incumbent
- Assumed office unknown Serving with Khalid Abdul Samad
- State Chairman: Tan Kok Wai

Branch Chief of the People's Justice Party of Bandar Tun Razak
- Incumbent
- Assumed office 2003
- President: Anwar Ibrahim

Personal details
- Born: 19 May 1972 (age 54) Hospital Kuala Lumpur, Kuala Lumpur
- Party: People's Justice Party (PKR)
- Other political affiliations: Pakatan Rakyat (PR) (2008–2015); Pakatan Harapan (PH) (2015–present)
- Occupation: Politician

Azman bin Abidin is a Malaysian politician who has served as the Political Secretary to the Prime Minister Anwar Ibrahim since December 2022. He is a member and Branch Chief of Bandar Tun Razak of the People's Justice Party (PKR), a component party of the Pakatan Harapan (PH), formerly Pakatan Rakyat (PR) coalitions.

== Early life and education ==
Azman Abidin was born in Hospital Kuala Lumpur on 19 May 1972 and began his early education at Pasar Road English School from 1979 to 1982 and then moved to Sekolah Kebangsaan Bandar Tun Razak from 1983 to 1984.

He attended Sekolah Menengah Rahmat Kuala Sungai Baru Melaka for secondary education from 1985 to 1987 and moved to Sekolah Menengah Teknik Cheras Kuala Lumpur from 1988 to 1989.

In 1996, he obtained the CMSRL - Capital Market Services Representative License holder from the Securities Commission.

== Political career ==
Azman has served as Branch Chief of the PKR of Bandar Tun Razak since 2003. In 2025 party election, he was reelected as Branch Chief of Bandar Tun Razak unopposed. Azman Abidin also served as Special Duties Officer to the Deputy Minister of Transport, Kamarudin Jaffar from 2018 to 2020 and Political Secretary to the Menteri Besar of Selangor Abd Khalid Ibrahim from 2012 to 2014. In 2024, he served as State Chairman of the PKR of Federal Territories. He also served as State Deputy Chairman of the Pakatan Harapan of Federal Territories.

== Honours ==
- Malacca
  - Companion Class I of the Exalted Order of Malacca (DMSM) – Datuk (2023)
