= Tan Kar Hing =

Malaysian politician

Yang Berhormat Tuan Tan Kar Hing MP
- 陈家兴
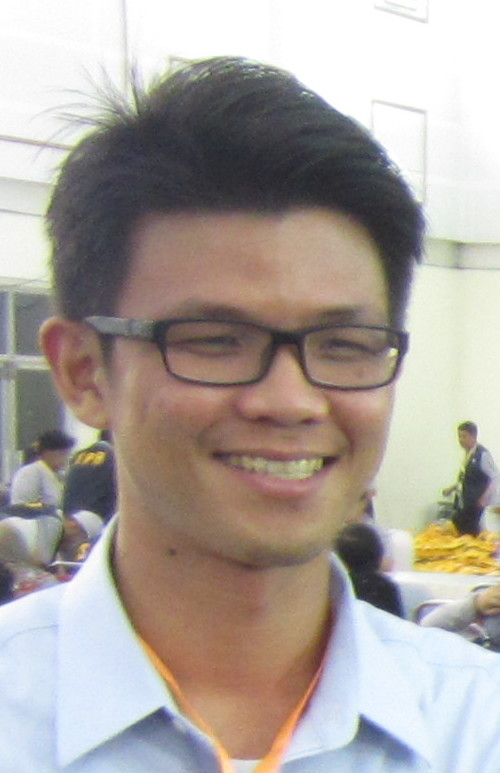
- Tan in 2013

Member of the Perak State Executive Council (Tourism, Arts and Culture)
- In office 19 May 2018 – 10 March 2020
- Monarch: Nazrin Shah
- Menteri Besar: Ahmad Faizal Azumu
- Preceded by: Nolee Ashilin Mohammed Radzi
- Succeeded by: Nolee Ashilin Mohammed Radzi (Tourism)
- Constituency: Simpang Pulai

Member of the Malaysian Parliament for Gopeng
- Incumbent
- Assumed office 19 November 2022
- Preceded by: Lee Boon Chye (PH−PKR)
- Majority: 27,148 (2022)

Member of the Perak State Legislative Assembly for Simpang Pulai
- In office 5 May 2013 – 19 November 2022
- Preceded by: Chan Ming Kai (PR–PKR)
- Succeeded by: Wong Chai Yi (PH–PKR)
- Majority: 11,083 (2013); 20,689 (2018)

Personal details
- Born: Tan Kar Hing; 4 May 1982 (age 44) Rawang, Selangor, Malaysia
- Party: People's Justice Party (PKR)
- Other political affiliations: Pakatan Rakyat (PR) (2008–2015); Pakatan Harapan (PH) (since 2015)
- Spouse: Lee Yin Ying
- Children: 2
- Education: University Putra Malaysia
- Occupation: Politician
- Website: Facebook Tan Kar Hing

Tan Kar Hing

Chinese name
- Traditional Chinese: 陳家興
- Simplified Chinese: 陈家兴
- Hanyu Pinyin: Chén Jiāxīng
- Jyutping: Can4 Gaa1 Hing3
- Hokkien POJ: Tân Ka-heng
- Tâi-lô: Tân Ka-hing

Tan Kar Hing (simplified Chinese: 陈家兴; traditional Chinese: 陳家興; pinyin: Chén Jiāxīng; Jyutping: Can4 Gaa1 Hing3; Pe̍h-ōe-jī: Tân Ka-heng; born 4 May 1982) is a Malaysian politician who has served as the Member of Parliament (MP) for Gopeng since November 2022. He served as Member of the Perak State Executive Council (EXCO) in the Pakatan Harapan (PH) state administration under former Menteri Besar Ahmad Faizal Azumu from May 2018 to the collapse of the PH state administration in March 2020 and Member of the Perak State Legislative Assembly (MLA) for Simpang Pulai from May 2013 to November 2022. He is a member and State Elections Department Director of Perak of the People's Justice Party (PKR), a component party of the PH coalition. He has also served as the State Vice Chairman of PKR of Perak since January 2019 and also served as the State Youth Chief of PKR of Perak.

== Political career ==
Tan first contested the Perak state seat of Simpang Pulai in the 2013 general election (GE13) as a PKR candidate and won with a majority of 11,083 votes. He successfully defended the seat in the 2018 general election (GE14), almost doubling his majority.

== Election result ==
Parliament of Malaysia
Year	Constituency	Candidate	Votes	Pct	Opponent(s)	Votes	Pct	Ballots cast	Majority	Turnout
2022	P071 Gopeng	Tan Kar Hing (PKR)	55,880	53.92%	Muhammad Farhan Abdul Rahim (BERSATU)	28,732	27.72%	103,638	27,148	72.14%
2022	P071 Gopeng	Tan Kar Hing (PKR)	55,880	53.92%	Cally Ting Zhao Song (MCA)	18,393	17.75%	103,638	27,148	72.14%
2022	P071 Gopeng	Tan Kar Hing (PKR)	55,880	53.92%	Balachandran Gopal (WARISAN)	633	0.61%	103,638	27,148	72.14%

Perak State Legislative Assembly
Year	Constituency	Candidate	Votes	Pct	Opponent(s)	Votes	Pct	Ballots cast	Majority	Turnout
2013	N44 Simpang Pulai	Tan Kar Hing (PKR)	18,780	70.13%	Chang Kon You @ Chen Kwan Wu (MCA)	7,697	28.74%	26,780	11,083	83.60%
2018	N45 Simpang Pulai	Tan Kar Hing (PKR)	25,659	59.60%	Liew Yee Lin (MCA)	4,970	14.16%	35,094	20,689	81.50%
2018	N45 Simpang Pulai	Tan Kar Hing (PKR)	25,659	59.60%	Mohamad Arif Abdul Latiff (PAS)	4,061	11.57%	35,094	20,689	81.50%

== Honours ==
=== Honours of Malaysia ===
- Malaysia
  - Recipient of the 17th Yang di-Pertuan Agong Installation Medal
