= Ahmad Farhan Fauzi =

Malaysian politician

Yang Berbahagia Dato' Ahmad Farhan Fauzi DIMP

Political Secretary to the Prime Minister
- Incumbent
- Assumed office 23 December 2022 Serving with Chan Ming Kai & Azman Abidin
- Monarchs: Abdullah; Ibrahim Iskandar
- Prime Minister: Anwar Ibrahim
- Senior Political Secretary: Shamsul Iskandar Mohd Akin

Personal details
- Party: People's Justice Party (PKR)
- Other political affiliations: Pakatan Harapan (PH)
- Relations: Abdul Rahman Talib (grandfather)
- Parent: Fauzi Abdul Rahman (father)
- Occupation: Politician

Ahmad Farhan bin Fauzi is a Malaysian politician who has served as the Political Secretary to the Prime Minister Anwar Ibrahim since December 2022. He is a member of the People's Justice Party (PKR), a component party of the Pakatan Harapan (PH) coalition.

Ahmad Farhan won the post of Indera Mahkota PKR branch chief unopposed in 2025.

== Honours ==
- Pahang
  - Knight Companion of the Order of the Crown of Pahang (DIMP) – Dato' (2024)
