= Simpang Pulai (state constituency) =

Political subdivision in Malaysia

Simpang Pulai (N45)
Perak constituency

State constituency
- Legislature: Perak State Legislative Assembly
MLA
Wong Chai Yi
PH
- Constituency created: 2003
- First contested: 2004
- Last contested: 2022

Demographics
- Electors (2022): 62,756

Simpang Pulai is a state constituency in Perak, Malaysia, that has been represented in the Perak State Legislative Assembly.

== Demographics ==
Ethnic breakdown of Simpang Pulai's electorate as of 2022
1. Chinese (60.1%)
2. Malay (31.3%)
3. Indian (7.70%)
4. Other ethnicities (0.82%)

== History ==
=== Polling districts ===
According to the federal gazette issued on 31 October 2022, the Simpang Pulai constituency is divided into 13 polling districts.

| State constituency | Polling Districts | Code | Location |
|---|---|---|---|
| Simpang Pulai (N45) | Pekan Razaki | 071/45/01 | SK Seri Ampang |
| Simpang Pulai (N45) | Ampang Baharu | 071/45/02 | SJK (C) Min Sin |
| Simpang Pulai (N45) | Taman Ampang | 071/45/03 | SMK Wira Jaya |
| Simpang Pulai (N45) | Kampong Seri Ampang | 071/45/04 | SK Wira Jaya |
| Simpang Pulai (N45) | Taman Ipoh Jaya | 071/45/05 | SMK Seri Ampang; SRA Rakyat Al-Solatiah |
| Simpang Pulai (N45) | Rapat Setia Baru | 071/45/06 | SMK Gunung Rapat; SRA Rakyat Al-Hidayah; SM Al-Hidayah |
| Simpang Pulai (N45) | Rapat Setia | 071/45/07 | SK Rapat Setia |
| Simpang Pulai (N45) | Gunong Rapat Utara | 071/45/08 | SJK (C) Gunung Rapat |
| Simpang Pulai (N45) | Gunong Rapat Selatan | 071/45/09 | SJK (C) Gunung Rapat |
| Simpang Pulai (N45) | Taman Taufik | 071/45/10 | Sekolah Tinggi Shen Jai; SRA Rakyat Al-Falah |
| Simpang Pulai (N45) | Kampong Sengat | 071/45/11 | SJK (C) Bandar Seri Botani |
| Simpang Pulai (N45) | Taman Bersatu | 071/45/12 | SK Taman Bersatu; Dewan Komuniti Taman Bersatu |
| Simpang Pulai (N45) | Simpang Pulai | 071/45/13 | SJK (C) Phui Ying |

=== Representation history ===
Members of the Legislative Assembly for Simpang Pulai
| Assembly | No | Years | Name | Party |
Constituency created from Rapat Setia, Teja, Hulu Kinta and Pasir Pinji
| 11th | N44 | 2004-2008 | Chan Chin Chee (曾镇池) | BN (MCA) |
| 12th | N44 | 2008-2013 | Chan Ming Kai (曾敏凱) | PR (PKR) |
| 13th | N44 | 2013-2018 | Tan Kar Hing (陈家兴) | PR (PKR) |
| 14th | N45 | 2018-2022 | Tan Kar Hing (陈家兴) | PH (PKR) |
| 15th | N45 | 2022–present | Wong Chai Yi (黃彩亿) | PH (PKR) |

== Election results ==
Perak state election, 2022
| Party | Candidate | Votes | % | ∆% |
|---|---|---|---|---|
| PH | Wong Chai Yi | 30,676 | 69.18 | ▲69.18 |
| PN | K Selvam | 7,403 | 16.69 | ▲16.69 |
| BN | Wayne Lee Wai Yin | 5,956 | 13.43 | ▼0.90 |
| Heritage | Hooi Mi Suet | 310 | 0.70 | ▲0.70 |
| Total valid votes | | 44,345 | 100.00 | |
| Total rejected ballots | | 517 | | |
| Unreturned ballots | | 46 | | |
| Turnout | | 44,908 | 70.66 | ▼10.85 |
| Registered electors | | 62,756 | | |
| Majority | | 23,273 | 52.49 | ▼7.15 |
| PH hold | | Swing | | |

Perak state election, 2018
| Party | Candidate | Votes | % | ∆% |
|---|---|---|---|---|
| PKR | Tan Kar Hing | 25,659 | 73.97 | ▲3.04 |
| BN | Wong Kam Seng | 4,970 | 14.33 | ▼14.74 |
| PAS | Mohd Arif Abd Latif | 4,061 | 11.71 | ▲11.71 |
| Total valid votes | | 34,690 | 98.85 | |
| Total rejected ballots | | 228 | 0.65 | |
| Unreturned ballots | | 176 | 0.50 | |
| Turnout | | 35,094 | 81.51 | ▼2.09 |
| Registered electors | | 43,055 | | |
| Majority | | 20,689 | 59.64 | ▲17.78 |
| PKR hold | | Swing | | |
Source(s) "RESULTS OF CONTESTED ELECTION AND STATEMENTS OF THE POLL AFTER THE OFFICIAL ADDITION OF VOTES".

Perak state election, 2013
| Party | Candidate | Votes | % | ∆% |
|---|---|---|---|---|
| PKR | Tan Kar Hing | 18,780 | 70.93 | ▲11.83 |
| BN | Chang Kon You | 7,697 | 29.07 | ▼11.83 |
| Total valid votes | | 26,477 | 98.71 | |
| Total rejected ballots | | 303 | 1.13 | |
| Unreturned ballots | | 44 | 0.16 | |
| Turnout | | 26,824 | 83.60 | ▲11.40 |
| Registered electors | | 32,101 | | |
| Majority | | 11,083 | 41.86 | ▲23.66 |
| PKR hold | | Swing | | |
Source(s) "KEPUTUSAN PILIHAN RAYA UMUM DEWAN UNDANGAN NEGERI".

Perak state election, 2008
| Party | Candidate | Votes | % | ∆% |
|---|---|---|---|---|
| PKR | Chan Ming Kai | 10,992 | 59.10 | ▲46.29 |
| BN | Chan Chin Chee | 7,606 | 40.90 | ▼9.09 |
| Total valid votes | | 18,598 | 98.47 | |
| Total rejected ballots | | 243 | 1.29 | |
| Unreturned ballots | | 0 | 0 | |
| Turnout | | 18,887 | 72.20 | ▲2.31 |
| Registered electors | | 26,159 | | |
| Majority | | 3,386 | 18.20 | ▲5.41 |
| PKR gain from BN | | Swing | | ? |
Source(s) "KEPUTUSAN PILIHAN RAYA UMUM DEWAN UNDANGAN NEGERI PERAK BAGI TAHUN 2008".

Perak state election, 2004
| Party | Candidate | Votes | % |
|---|---|---|---|
| BN | Chan Chin Chee | 8,303 | 49.99 |
| DAP | Beh Boon Chong | 6,179 | 37.20 |
| PKR | Tai Sing Ng | 2,127 | 12.81 |
| Total valid votes | | 16,609 | 97.17 |
| Total rejected ballots | | 454 | 2.66 |
| Unreturned ballots | | 29 | 0.17 |
| Turnout | | 17,092 | 69.89 |
| Registered electors | | 24,454 | |
| Majority | | 2,124 | 12.79 |
This was a new constituency created.
Source(s) "KEPUTUSAN PILIHAN RAYA UMUM DEWAN UNDANGAN NEGERI PERAK BAGI TAHUN 2004".
