= Gan Ay Ling =

Malaysian politician, volunteer, assistant engineer and pricing analyst

Yang Berhormat Puan Gan Ay Ling MLA
- 颜艾菱

State Leader of the Opposition of Perlis
- Incumbent
- Assumed office 19 November 2022
- Monarch: Sirajuddin
- Menteri Besar: Mohd Shukri Ramli (2022–2025); Abu Bakar Hamzah (since 2025)
- Preceded by: Asrul Nizan Abd Jalil
- Constituency: Indera Kayangan

Member of the Perlis State Legislative Assembly for Indera Kayangan
- Incumbent
- Assumed office 9 May 2018
- Preceded by: Chan Ming Kai (PR–PKR)
- Majority: 3,177 (2018); 1,873 (2022)

Women's Treasurer of the People's Justice Party
- Incumbent
- Assumed office 10 June 2025
- Women Chief: Fadhlina Sidek
- Preceded by: Sabrina Ahmad

Personal details
- Born: Gan Ay Ling Kuala Pilah, Negeri Sembilan, Malaysia
- Citizenship: Malaysia
- Party: People's Justice Party (PKR)
- Other political affiliations: Pakatan Harapan (PH)
- Spouse: Lee Kok Seong (李国城)
- Children: 3
- Education: University of Technology Malaysia (UTM) (Majoring in Computer Science and Information System)
- Occupation: Politician; volunteer
- Profession: Assistant engineer; pricing analyst
- Gan Ay Ling on Facebook

Gan Ay Ling (Chinese: 颜艾菱; pinyin: Yán Àilíng) is a Malaysian politician, volunteer, assistant engineer and pricing analyst who has served as Leader of the Opposition of Perlis since November 2022 and Member of the Perlis State Legislative Assembly (MLA) for Indera Kayangan since May 2018. She is a member of the People's Justice Party (PKR), a component party of the Pakatan Harapan (PH) coalition. She has also served as the Women Treasurer of PKR since June 2025. She was Member of the Penang Island City Council and State Women Chief of PKR of Perlis. She is currently the sole opposition representative in the Perlis state assembly, following Perikatan Nasional's electoral sweep of 14 out of 15 seats in the last 2022 Perlis state election.

== Personal life ==
Gan was born into a middle-class family as the fifth child among the six children of her parents and was raised by her single mother in Kuala Pilah, Negeri Sembilan, Malaysia. She is married to Lee Kok Seong and has three children with him.

== Volunteering career ==
Gan was involved in the Malaysian Red Crescent Society (MRCS) voluntary organisation. In addition, she joined the 6th Asia and Pacific Red Cross Youth Gathering in Vajiravuth Scout Camp Chon Buri Province, Thailand. She also received the honorary degree award of the Young Meritorious Service Medal from the MRCS.

== Political career ==
=== Member of the Perlis State Legislative Assembly (since 2018) ===
==== 2018 Perlis state election ====
In the 2018 Perlis state election, Gan made her electoral debut after being nominated by PH to contest for the Indera Kayangan state seat. She won the seat and was elected into the Perlis State Legislative Assembly as the Indera Kayangan MLA for the first term after defeating Chuah Tian Hee of Barisan Nasional (BN) and Wan Hassan Ismail of Gagasan Sejahtera (GS) by the majority of 3,177 votes.

==== 2022 Perlis state election ====
In the 2022 Perlis state election, Gan was renominated by PH to defend the Indera Kayangan seat. She defended the seat and was reelected as the Indera Kayangan MLA for the second term after defeating Pramoot Puan of PN, Lim Weng Khee of BN as well as Atan Jasin of the Heritage Party (WARISAN) by a majority of 1,873 votes. Indera Kayangan is the safest Perlis state seat for PH and PKR according to some analysis and it is attributed to the victory of Gan in the election despite "green wave", a new phrase describing the spread of political influence of the Malaysian Islamic Party (PAS), a component party of the PN coalition which is represented by a green flag from the east coast areas of Peninsular Malaysia to other areas like Perlis located at the northwest coast of the peninsular as Indera Kayangan has the biggest share of voters of the Chinese ethnicity who mostly support and vote for PH in the ethnic breakdown of Perlis.

=== Leader of the Opposition of Perlis (since 2022) ===
The 2022 Perlis state election won by PN as it won 14 out of 15 state seats and therefore two-thirds supermajority of the assembly left Gan as the PH candidate who won the remaining 1 seat. She then became the Leader of the Opposition of Perlis replacing Asrul Nizan Abd Jalil of PH and PKR who also lost his Sena seat to Marzita Mansor of PN in the election. She hoped to work closely with the state government led by Menteri Besar Mohd Shukri Ramli to develop the state in the spirit of cooperation regardless of political affiliations of the federal coalition government led by Prime Minister Anwar Ibrahim although both governments are led by leaders of different and opposing political coalitions to prevent the state from falling behind other states on development. She also thanked Mohd Shukri on giving her equal and fair treatments and praised him for creating great achievements in terms of investments and developments he brought to the state in the first 100 days of his Menteri Besarship and his state government.

== Election results ==
Perlis State Legislative Assembly
| Year | Constituency | Candidate | Votes | Pct | Opponent(s) | Votes | Pct | Ballots cast | Majority | Turnout |
|---|---|---|---|---|---|---|---|---|---|---|
| 2018 | N08 Indera Kayangan | Gan Ay Ling (PKR) | 5,023 | 57.71% | Chuah Tian Hee (MCA) | 1,846 | 21.21% | 8,704 | 3,177 | 80.39% |
| 2018 | N08 Indera Kayangan | Gan Ay Ling (PKR) | 5,023 | 57.71% | Wan Hassan Ismail (PAS) | 1,835 | 21.08% | 8,704 | 3,177 | 80.39% |
| 2022 | N08 Indera Kayangan | Gan Ay Ling (PKR) | 4,830 | 46.42% | Pramoot Puan (BERSATU) | 2,957 | 28.42% | 10,405 | 1,873 | 71.93% |
| 2022 | N08 Indera Kayangan | Gan Ay Ling (PKR) | 4,830 | 46.42% | Lim Weng Khee (MCA) | 1,882 | 18.09% | 10,405 | 1,873 | 71.93% |
| 2022 | N08 Indera Kayangan | Gan Ay Ling (PKR) | 4,830 | 46.42% | Atan Jasin (WARISAN) | 736 | 7.07% | 10,405 | 1,873 | 71.93% |

== Honours ==
- Perlis
  - Recipient of Tuanku Syed Sirajuddin Jamalullail Silver Jubilee Medal (2025)
