= Bukit Katil (federal constituency) =

Malacca constituency

Defunct federal constituency
- Legislature: Dewan Rakyat
- Constituency created: 2003
- Constituency abolished: 2018
- First contested: 2004
- Last contested: 2013

Bukit Katil was a federal constituency in Malacca, Malaysia, that was represented in the Dewan Rakyat from 2004 to 2018.

The federal constituency was created in the 2003 redistribution and was mandated to return a single member to the Dewan Rakyat under the first past the post voting system.

== History ==
It was abolished in 2018 when it was redistributed.

=== Representation history ===
Members of Parliament for Bukit Katil
Parliament	No	Years	Member	Party	Vote Share
Constituency created from Batu Berendam and Kota Melaka
11th	P137	2004-2008	Mohd Ruddin Ab Ghani (محمد روددين اب غني)	BN (UMNO)	39,491; 76.34%
12th	P137	2008-2013	Md Sirat Abu (مد سيرت ابو)	BN (UMNO)	30,975; 51.46%
13th	P137	2013-2018	Shamsul Iskandar Mohd Akin (شمس الإسكندر محمد عقين)	PR (PKR)	46,357; 53.30%
Constituency abolished, renamed to Hang Tuah Jaya

=== State constituency ===
Parliamentary constituency	State constituency						
Parliamentary constituency	1955–59*	1959–1974	1974–1986	1986–1995	1995–2004	2004–2018	2018–present
Bukit Katil						Ayer Keroh	
Bukit Katil						Ayer Molek	
Bukit Katil						Bachang	
Bukit Katil						Bukit Baru	

=== Historical boundaries ===
State Constituency	Area
State Constituency	2003
Ayer Keroh	Ayer Keroh; Batu Berendam; Bukit Beruang; Taman Merdeka Jaya; Taman Tasik Utama
Ayer Molek	Ayer Molek; Bukit Lintang; Bukit Nibong; Kandang; Tiang Dua
Bachang	Bachang; Bukit Piatu; Malim Jaya; Pengkalan Batu; Peringgit
Bukit Baru	Bukit Baru; Bukit Katil; Kampung Padang Jambu; Kampung Telok; Taman Saujana

== Election results ==
Malaysian general election, 2013
Party	Candidate	Votes	%	∆%
PKR	Shamsul Iskandar Mohd Akin	46,357	53.30	▲4.76
BN	Mohd Ali Mohd Rustam	40,624	46.70	▼4.76
Total valid votes		86,981	100.00	
Total rejected ballots		1,102		
Unreturned ballots		188		
Turnout		88,271	88.77	▲6.85
Registered electors		99,438		
Majority		5,733	6.60	▲3.68
PKR gain from BN		Swing		?
Source(s) "Federal Government Gazette - Notice of Contested Election, Parliament for the State of Malacca [P.U. (B) 180/2013]" (PDF). Attorney General's Chambers of Malaysia. 26 April 2013. "Federal Government Gazette - Results of Contested Election and Statements of the Poll after the Official Addition of Votes, Parliamentary Constituencies for the State of Malacca [P.U. (B) 221/2013]" (PDF). Attorney General's Chambers of Malaysia. 22 May 2013.

Malaysian general election, 2008
Party	Candidate	Votes	%	∆%
BN	Md Sirat Abu	30,975	51.46	▼24.88
PKR	Khalid Jaafar	29,217	48.54	▲24.88
Total valid votes		60,192	100.00	
Total rejected ballots		1,173		
Unreturned ballots		708		
Turnout		62,073	81.92	▲1.43
Registered electors		75,777		
Majority		1,758	2.92	▼49.76
BN hold		Swing		

Malaysian general election, 2004
Party	Candidate	Votes	%
BN	Mohd Ruddin Ab Ghani	39,491	76.34
PKR	Khalid Jaafar	12,239	23.66
Total valid votes		51,730	100.00
Total rejected ballots		1,334	
Unreturned ballots		85	
Turnout		53,149	80.49
Registered electors			
Majority		27,252	52.68
This was a new constituency created.
