= Rahmad Mariman =

Malaysian politician (born 1964)

Yang Berbahagia Datuk Rahmad Mariman DMSM DSM BCM PJK
- رحمة بن ماريمان

Member of the Malacca State Executive Council
- In office 5 April 2023 (Education, Higher Education and Religious Affairs) – 23 September 2026
- Governor: Mohd Ali Rustam
- Deputy: Rosli Abdullah
- Chief Minister: Ab Rauf Yusoh
- Preceded by: Rais Yasin (Education); Sulaiman Md Ali (Religious Affairs); Portfolio established (Higher Education)
- Constituency: Ayer Molek
- In office 26 November 2021 – 31 March 2023 (Public Works, Transport, Public Facilities, Infrastructure and Flood Management)
- Governor: Mohd Ali Rustam
- Chief Minister: Sulaiman Md Ali
- Preceded by: Roslan Ahmad (Public Works, Transport, Public Facilities and Infrastructure); Idris Haron (Flood Management)
- Succeeded by: Hameed Mytheen Kunju Basheer (Public Works, Infrastructure, Public Facilities and Transport); Portfolio abolished (Flood Management)
- Constituency: Ayer Molek
- In office 13 March 2020 – 21 November 2021 (Health and Anti-drugs)
- Governor: Mohd Khalil Yaakob (2020); Mohd Ali Rustam (2020–2021)
- Chief Minister: Sulaiman Md Ali
- Preceded by: Low Chee Leong (Health); Portfolio established (Anti-drugs)
- Succeeded by: Muhamad Akmal Saleh
- Constituency: Ayer Molek

Member of the Malacca State Legislative Assembly for Ayer Molek
- In office 9 May 2018 – 14 November 2026
- Preceded by: Md. Yunos Husin (BN–UMNO)
- Succeeded by: Mohd Ridhwan Mohd Ali (BN–UMNO)
- Majority: 1,802 (2018); 2,802 (2021)

Faction represented in Melaka State Legislative Assembly
- 2018–2026: Barisan Nasional

Personal details
- Born: Rahmad bin Mariman; 14 October 1964 (age 62) Malacca, Malaysia
- Citizenship: Malaysian
- Party: United Malays National Organisation (UMNO)
- Other political affiliations: Barisan Nasional (BN)
- Occupation: Politician
- Rahmad Mariman on Facebook

Rahmad bin Mariman (born 14 October 1964) is a Malaysian politician who has served as Member of the Melaka State Executive Council (EXCO) in the Barisan Nasional (BN) state administration under Chief Minister Ab Rauf Yusoh from April 2023 till September 2026 for the third term, under former Chief Minister Sulaiman Md Ali from November 2021 to March 2023 for the second term, from March 2020 to November 2021 for the first term and Member of the Melaka State Legislative Assembly (MLA) for Ayer Molek from May 2018 till September 2026. He is a member of the United Malays National Organisation (UMNO), a component party of the BN coalition.

== Election results ==
Malacca State Legislative Assembly
Year	Constituency	Candidate	Votes	Pct	Opponent(s)	Votes	Pct	Ballots cast	Majority	Turnout
2018	N18 Ayer Molek	Rahmad Mariman (UMNO)	6,951	45.56%	Farhan Ibrahim @ Alias (PKR)	5,146	33.72%	15,513	1,805	87.60%
2018	N18 Ayer Molek	Rahmad Mariman (UMNO)	6,951	45.56%	Jantan Abdullah (PAS)	3,082	20.20%	15,513	1,805	87.60%
2018	N18 Ayer Molek	Rahmad Mariman (UMNO)	6,951	45.56%	Kamarolzaman Mohd Jidi (IND)	79	0.52%	15,513	1,805	87.60%
2021	N18 Ayer Molek	Rahmad Mariman (UMNO)	6,348	51.07%	Mohd Fadly Samin (BERSATU)	3,546	28.53%	12,430	2,802	69.59%
2021	N18 Ayer Molek	Rahmad Mariman (UMNO)	6,348	51.07%	Mohd Rafee Ibrahim (PKR)	2,446	19.68%	12,430	2,802	69.59%
2021	N18 Ayer Molek	Rahmad Mariman (UMNO)	6,348	51.07%	Ahmad Muaz Idris (IND)	90	0.72%	12,430	2,802	69.59%

== Honours ==
- Malacca
  - Companion of the Exalted Order of Malacca (DMSM) – Datuk (2020)
  - Member of the Exalted Order of Malacca (DSM) (2015)
  - Recipient of the Distinguished Service Star (BCM) (2011)
  - Recipient of the Meritorious Service Medal (PJK) (2004)
