= Chan Ming Kai =

Malaysian politician (born 1980)

- 曾敏凯
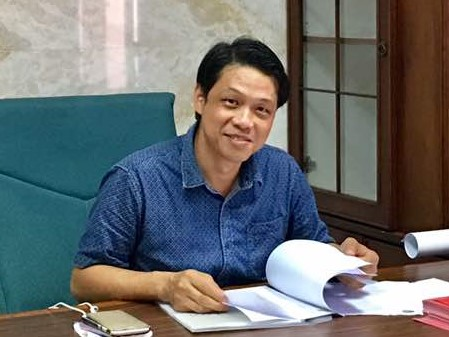

Political Secretary to the Prime Minister
- Incumbent
- Assumed office 1 December 2022 Serving with Ahmad Farhan Fauzi & Azman Abidin
- Monarchs: Abdullah; Ibrahim Iskandar
- Prime Minister: Anwar Ibrahim
- Senior Political Secretary: Shamsul Iskandar Mohd Akin
- Preceded by: Mohammad Anuar Mohd Yunus

Member of the Malaysian Parliament for Alor Setar
- In office 9 May 2018 – 19 November 2022
- Preceded by: Gooi Hsiao Leung (PH–PKR)
- Succeeded by: Afnan Hamimi Taib Azamudden (PN–PAS)
- Majority: 15,200 (2018)

Member of the Perlis State Legislative Assembly for Indera Kayangan
- In office 5 May 2013 – 9 May 2018
- Preceded by: Por Choo Chor (BN–MCA)
- Succeeded by: Gan Ay Ling (PH–PKR)
- Majority: 1,092 (2013)

Member of the Perak State Legislative Assembly for Simpang Pulai
- In office 8 March 2008 – 5 May 2013
- Preceded by: Chan Chin Chee (BN–MCA)
- Succeeded by: Tan Kar Hing (PR–PKR)
- Majority: 3,386 (2008)

Faction represented in Dewan Rakyat
- 2018–2022: Pakatan Harapan

Faction represented in Perlis State Legislative Assembly
- 2013–2018: People's Justice Party

Faction represented in Perak State Legislative Assembly
- 2008–2013: People's Justice Party

Personal details
- Born: Chan Ming Kai; 7 October 1980 (age 45) Ipoh, Perak, Malaysia
- Citizenship: Malaysian
- Party: People's Justice Party (PKR)
- Other political affiliations: Pakatan Harapan (PH) (since 2015); Pakatan Rakyat (PR) (−2015)
- Education: University of Technology Malaysia (BTM); University of London (LLB)
- Occupation: Politician
- Chan Ming Kai on Parliament of Malaysia

Chan Ming Kai (Chinese: 曾敏凱; pinyin: Zēng Mǐnkǎi; Jyutping: Zang1 Man5 Hoi2; Pe̍h-ōe-jī: Chan Bín-khái; born 7 October 1980) is a Malaysian politician who has served as the Political Secretary to Prime Minister Anwar Ibrahim since December 2022. He served as the Member of Parliament (MP) for Alor Setar from May 2018 to November 2022, Member of the Perlis State Legislative Assembly (MLA) for Indera Kayangan from May 2013 to May 2018 and MLA of Perak for Simpang Pulai from March 2008 to May 2013. He is a member of the People's Justice Party (PKR), a component party of the Pakatan Harapan (PH) coalition.

== Personal life ==
Chan attended University of Technology Malaysia (UTM), where he received Bachelor of Technology Management in 2002. He later received another bachelor's degree in law from University of London in 2007 by self study.

== Political career ==
Chan was first elected as people's representative in the 2008 general election winning the state constituency of Simpang Pulai, Perak. In the 2013 general election, Chan wrestled the Indera Kayangan state constituency seat in Perlis from the predecessor, Malaysian Chinese Association (MCA)'s Por Choo Chor.

In the 2018 general election, Chan was elected as Member of Parliament for the constituency of Alor Setar in Kedah.

== Election results ==
Perak State Legislative Assembly
Year	Constituency	Candidate	Votes	Pct	Opponent(s)	Votes	Pct	Ballots cast	Majority	Turnout
2008	N44 Simpang Pulai	Chan Ming Kai (PKR)	10,992	58.20%	Chan Chin Chee (MCA)	7,606	40.27%	18,887	3,386	72.20%

Perlis State Legislative Assembly
Year	Constituency	Candidate	Votes	Pct	Opponent(s)	Votes	Pct	Ballots cast	Majority	Turnout
2013	N08 Indera Kayangan	Chan Ming Kai (PKR)	4,263	53.24%	Por Choo Chor (MCA)	3,171	39.60%	8,007	1,092	81.90%
2013	N08 Indera Kayangan	Chan Ming Kai (PKR)	4,263	53.24%	Amier Hassan (IND)	404	5.05%	8,007	1,092	81.90%

Parliament of Malaysia
Year	Constituency	Candidate	Votes	Pct	Opponent(s)	Votes	Pct	Ballots cast	Majority	Turnout
2018	P009 Alor Setar	Chan Ming Kai (PKR)	32,475	50.80%	Muhd Aminur Shafiq (PAS)	17,275	27.02%	64,812	15,200	81.09%
2018	P009 Alor Setar	Chan Ming Kai (PKR)	32,475	50.80%	Yoo Wei How (MCA)	14,181	22.18%	64,812	15,200	81.09%
