= Indera Kayangan (state constituency) =

State constituency in Perlis, Malaysia

Indera Kayangan (N08)
Perlis constituency

State constituency
- Legislature: Perlis State Legislative Assembly
MLA
Gan Ay Ling
PH
- Constituency created: 1984
- First contested: 1986
- Last contested: 2022

Demographics
- Electors (2022): 14,465

Indera Kayangan is a state constituency in Perlis, Malaysia, that has been represented in the Perlis State Legislative Assembly since 1986. It has been represented by State Leader of the Opposition Gan Ay Ling of Pakatan Harapan (PH) since 2018. She is also the only Opposition and PH Member of the Perlis State Legislative Assembly (MLA) after the 2022 Perlis state election.

The state constituency was created in 1984. It was first contested in 1986 and is mandated to return a single Assemblyman to the Perlis State Legislative Assembly under the first-past-the-post voting system.

== Definition ==
=== Polling districts ===
According to the federal gazette issued on 31 October 2022, the Indera Kayangan constituency is divided into 7 polling districts.

State constituency	Polling Districts	Code	Location
Indera Kayangan (N08)	Padang Katong	002/08/01	SK Putra
Indera Kayangan (N08)	Derma	002/08/02	SMK Syed Hassan
Indera Kayangan (N08)	Pekan Lama Kangar	002/08/03	SMK Derma
Indera Kayangan (N08)	Pengkalan Assam	002/08/04	SMK Putra
Indera Kayangan (N08)	Pekan Baru Kangar	002/08/05	SK Seri Perlis
Indera Kayangan (N08)	Seberang Bakau	002/08/06	SJK (C) Khoon Aik
Indera Kayangan (N08)	Behor Gandin	002/08/07	SK Jalan Raja Syed Alwi

== Demographics ==
Ethnic breakdown of Indera Kayangan's electorate as of 2022
1. Malays (53.8%)
2. Chinese (39.9%)
3. Indians (3.42%)
4. Other Ethnicities (2.94%)

Total electors by polling district in 2016
Polling district	Electors
Padang Katong	1,058
Derma	876
Pekan Lama Kangar	1,101
Pengkalan Assam	1,000
Pekan Baru Kangar	1,656
Seberang Bakau	2,469
Behor Gandin	1,869
Total	10,029
Source: Malaysian Election Commission

== History ==
Members of the Legislative Assembly for Indera Kayangan
Assembly	No	Years	Member	Party
Constituency created from Bandar Kangar
7th	N07	1986–1990	Lee Kim Cheng (李金章)	BN (MCA)
8th	N07	1990–1995	Khor Liang Tee (许量迪)	BN (MCA)
9th	N08	1995–1999	Khor Liang Tee (许量迪)	BN (MCA)
10th	N08	1999–2002	Khor Liang Tee (许量迪)	BN (MCA)
10th	N08	2002–2004	Oui Ah Lan (黃雅兰)	BN (MCA)
11th	N08	2004–2008	Oui Ah Lan (黃雅兰)	BN (MCA)
12th	N08	2008–2013	Por Choo Chor (傅子初)	BN (MCA)
13th	N08	2013–2018	Chan Ming Kai (曾敏凯)	PR (PKR)
14th	N08	2018–2022	Gan Ay Ling (颜艾菱)	PH (PKR)
15th	N08	2022–present	Gan Ay Ling (颜艾菱)	PH (PKR)

== Election results ==
Perlis state election, 2022
Party	Candidate	Votes	%	∆%
PH	Gan Ay Ling	4,830	46.42	▲46.42
PN	Pramoot Puan	2,957	28.42	▲28.42
BN	Lim Weng Kee	1,882	18.09	▼3.12
Heritage	Atan Jasin	736	7.07	▲7.07
Total valid votes		10,405	100.00	
Total rejected ballots		129		
Unreturned ballots		16		
Turnout		10,550	72.93	▼7.45
Registered electors		14,465		
Majority		1,873	18.00	▼18.50
PH hold		Swing		

Perlis state election, 2018
Party	Candidate	Votes	%	∆%
PKR	Gan Ay Ling	5,023	57.71	▲3.32
BN	Chuah Tian Hee	1,846	21.21	▼19.25
PAS	Wan Hassan Ismail	1,835	21.08	▲21.08
Total valid votes		8,704	100.00	
Total rejected ballots		114		
Unreturned ballots		39		
Turnout		8,857	80.39	▼1.79
Registered electors		11,018		
Majority		3,177	36.50	▲22.57
PKR hold		Swing		

Perlis state election, 2013
Party	Candidate	Votes	%	∆%
PKR	Chan Ming Kai	4,263	54.39	▲14.63
BN	Por Choo Chor @ Por Choo Chuan	3,171	40.46	▼19.78
Independent	Ameir Hassan	404	5.15	▲5.15
Total valid votes		7,838	100.00	
Total rejected ballots		144		
Unreturned ballots		52		
Turnout		8,034	82.18	▲7.95
Registered electors		9,776		
Majority		1,092	13.93	▼6.55
PKR gain from BN		Swing		?
Source(s) "Federal Government Gazette - Notice of Contested Election, State Legislative Assembly for the State of Perlis [P.U. (B) 185/2013]" (PDF). Attorney General's Chambers of Malaysia. 26 April 2013. "Federal Government Gazette - Results of Contested Election and Statements of the Poll after the Official Addition of Votes, State Constituencies for the State of Perlis [P.U. (B) 226/2013]" (PDF). Attorney General's Chambers of Malaysia. 22 May 2013.

Perlis state election, 2008
Party	Candidate	Votes	%	∆%
BN	Por Choo Chor @ Por Choo Chuan	3,714	60.24	▼15.50
PKR	Poziyah Hamzah	2,451	39.76	▲15.50
Total valid votes		6,165	100.00	
Total rejected ballots		129		
Unreturned ballots		28		
Turnout		6,322	74.23	▼3.73
Registered electors		8,517		
Majority		1,263	20.49	▼31.00
BN hold		Swing		

Perlis state election, 2004
Party	Candidate	Votes	%	∆%
BN	Oui Ah Lan @ Ng Ah Lan	5,243	75.74	▲4.02
PKR	Khoo Yang Chong	1,679	24.26	▼4.02
Total valid votes		6,922	100.00	
Total rejected ballots		304		
Unreturned ballots		35		
Turnout		7,261	77.96	▲1.97
Registered electors		9,314		
Majority		3,564	51.49	▲8.04
BN hold		Swing		

Perlis state by-election, 19 January 2002 Upon the death of incumbent, Khor Liang Tee
Party	Candidate	Votes	%	∆%
BN	Oui Ah Lan @ Ng Ah Lan	4,279	71.72	▲4.33
PKR	Khoo Yang Chong	1,687	28.28	▼4.33
Total valid votes		5,966	100.00	
Total rejected ballots		81		
Unreturned ballots		14		
Turnout		6,061	75.99	▲0.45
Registered electors		7,976		
Majority		2,592	43.45	▲8.67
BN hold		Swing		

Perlis state election, 1999
Party	Candidate	Votes	%	∆%
BN	Khor Liang Tee @ Khor Lian Tee	3,825	67.39	▼13.04
PKR	Ko Chu Liang	1,851	32.61	▲32.61
Total valid votes		5,676	100.00	
Total rejected ballots		154		
Unreturned ballots		196		
Turnout		6,026	75.54	▲4.02
Registered electors		7,977		
Majority		1,974	34.78	▼26.08
BN hold		Swing		

Perlis state election, 1995
Party	Candidate	Votes	%	∆%
BN	Khor Liang Tee @ Khor Lian Tee	4,405	80.43	▲11.33
S46	Tengku Yaakob Tengku Mohamad	1,072	19.57	▲19.57
Total valid votes		5,477	100.00	
Total rejected ballots		118		
Unreturned ballots		1		
Turnout		5,596	71.52	▼1.48
Registered electors		7,824		
Majority		3,333	60.85	▲20.32
BN hold		Swing		

Perlis state election, 1990
Party	Candidate	Votes	%	∆%
BN	Khor Liang Tee @ Khor Lian Tee	4,016	69.10	▼5.25
Independent	Rodzi Ramli	1,660	28.56	▲28.56
Independent	Lim Teng Hock	136	2.34	▲2.34
Total valid votes		5,812	100.00	
Total rejected ballots		201		
Unreturned ballots		76		
Turnout		6,089	73.00	▲3.09
Registered electors		8,341		
Majority		2,356	40.54	▼8.17
BN hold		Swing		

Perlis state election, 1986
Party	Candidate	Votes	%
BN	Lee Kim Cheng	4,018	74.35
PAS	Hamid Mohamood @ Abd. Razak Mohamood	1,386	25.65
Total valid votes		5,404	100.00
Total rejected ballots		141	
Unreturned ballots		0	
Turnout		5,545	69.91
Registered electors		7,932	
Majority		2,632	48.70
This was a new constituency created.
