= Md Sirat Abu =

Malaysian politician

Yang Berbahagia Datuk Md Sirat Abu DMSM KMN JP
- مد صِرَاط أبو

Member of the Malaysian Parliament for Bukit Katil
- In office 8 March 2008 – 5 May 2013
- Preceded by: Ruddin Ab Ghani (BN–UMNO)
- Succeeded by: Shamsul Iskandar Mohd Akin (PR–PKR)
- Majority: 1,758 (2008)

Personal details
- Born: 11 April 1959 (age 67) Malacca, Federation of Malaya (now Malaysia)
- Party: United Malays National Organisation (UMNO)
- Other political affiliations: Barisan Nasional (BN); Perikatan Nasional (PN); Muafakat Nasional (MN)
- Spouse: Dewi Murni Ibrahim
- Children: 4
- Occupation: Politician
- Website: p137bukitkatil.blogspot.com

Md Sirat bin Abu (born 11 April 1959) is a Malaysian politician and a former Member of the Parliament of Malaysia for the Bukit Katil constituency in the state of Melaka. He is a member of the United Malays National Organisation (UMNO) party in the governing Barisan Nasional coalition.

Md Sirat was elected to federal Parliament in the 2008 election, having been nominated by UMNO to contest the seat ahead of its incumbent member Ruddin Ab Ghani. He had earlier served as President of the Melaka Municipal Council and political secretary to the Chief Minister of Malacca, Mohd Ali Rustam. He was dropped from UMNO's list of candidates for the 2013 Malaysian general election in favour of Mohd Ali, who was seeking to move to the federal parliament. Mohd Ali's move failed when the seat fell to the People's Justice Party's Shamsul Iskandar Mohd Akin.

== Election results ==
Parliament of Malaysia
Year	Constituency	Candidate	Votes	Pct	Opponent(s)	Votes	Pct	Ballots cast	Majority	Turnout
2008	P137 Bukit Katil	Md Sirat Abu (UMNO)	30,975	51.46%	Khalid Jaafar (PKR)	29,217	48.54%	62,073	1,758	81.92%

== Honours ==
- Malaysia
  - Officer of the Order of the Defender of the Realm (KMN) (2006)
- Malacca
  - Companion Class I of the Exalted Order of Malacca (DMSM) – Datuk (2002)
  - Jusitice of the Peace (JP) (2000)
