= Wong Chai Yi =

Malaysian politician

Yang Berhormat Puan Wong Chai Yi MLA
- 黄彩仪

Member of the Perak State Legislative Assembly for Simpang Pulai
- Incumbent
- Assumed office 19 November 2022
- Preceded by: Tan Kar Hing (PH–PKR)
- Majority: 23,273 (2022)

Personal details
- Citizenship: Malaysian
- Party: People's Justice Party (PKR)
- Other political affiliations: Pakatan Harapan (PH)
- Occupation: Politician

Wong Chai Yi is a Malaysian politician who has served as Member of the Perak State Legislative Assembly (MLA) for Simpang Pulai since November 2022. She is a member of People's Justice Party (PKR), a component party of Pakatan Harapan (PH) coalitions.

== Election results ==
Perak State Legislative Assembly
Year	Constituency	Candidate	Votes	Pct	Opponent(s)	Votes	Pct	Ballots cast	Majority	Turnout
2022	N45 Simpang Pulai	Wong Chai Yi (PKR)	30,676	69.18%	Selvam Kunjambu (PAS)	7,403	16.69%	44,908	23,273	70.66%
2022	N45 Simpang Pulai	Wong Chai Yi (PKR)	30,676	69.18%	Wayne Lee Wai Yin (MCA)	5,956	13.43%	44,908	23,273	70.66%
2022	N45 Simpang Pulai	Wong Chai Yi (PKR)	30,676	69.18%	Hooi Mi Suet (WARISAN)	310	0.70%	44,908	23,273	70.66%
