= Hang Tuah Jaya (federal constituency) =

Federal constituency of Malacca, Malaysia

Hang Tuah Jaya (P137)
Malacca constituency

Federal constituency
- Legislature: Dewan Rakyat
- MP: Adam Adli Abd Halim; PH
- Constituency created: 2018
- First contested: 2018
- Last contested: 2022

Demographics
- Population (2020): 183,693
- Electors (2026): 124,173
- Area (km²): 116
- Pop. density (per km²): 1,583.6

Hang Tuah Jaya is a federal constituency in Melaka Tengah District and Jasin District, Malacca, Malaysia, that has been represented in the Dewan Rakyat since 2018.

The federal constituency was created in the 2018 redistribution and is mandated to return a single member to the Dewan Rakyat under the first past the post voting system.

== Demographics ==
Ethnic breakdown of Hang Tuah Jaya's electorate as of 2022
1. Malay (63.0%)
2. Chinese (30.5%)
3. Indian (5.90%)
4. Other ethnicities (0.50%)

As of 2020, Hang Tuah Jaya has a population of 183,693 people.

Age breakdown of Hang Tuah Jaya's electorate as of 2022
1. 18-20 (6.40%)
2. 21-29 (21.8%)
3. 30-39 (22.6%)
4. 40-49 (16.8%)
5. 50-59 (13.9%)
6. 60-69 (11.3%)
7. 70-79 (5.34%)
8. 80-89 (1.59%)
9. above 90 (0.24%)
Gender breakdown of Hang Tuah Jaya's electorate as of 2022
1. Male (49.0%)
2. Female (51.0%)

== History ==
=== Polling districts ===
According to the federal gazette issued on 5 November 2026, the Hang Tuah Jaya constituency is divided into 24 polling districts.

State constituency	Polling District	Code	Location
Pengkalan Batu（N15）	Bachang Baru	137/15/01	Kompleks JAPERUN DUN Bachang
Pengkalan Batu（N15）	Pasir Puteh	137/15/02	SJK (C) Yu Hwa
Pengkalan Batu（N15）	Pengkalan Batu	137/15/03	SMA Sultan Muhammad
Pengkalan Batu（N15）	Rumpun Bahagia	137/15/04	Balai Raya Taman Rumpun Bahagia
Pengkalan Batu（N15）	Peringgit	137/15/05	SK Peringgit
Pengkalan Batu（N15）	Peringgit Jaya	137/15/06	Dewan Terbuka Taman Seri Cempaka
Pengkalan Batu（N15）	Bukit Palah	137/15/07	SRA (JAIM) Peringgit
Pengkalan Batu（N15）	Seri Siantan	137/15/08	SRA (JAIM) Solok Musai
Pengkalan Batu（N15）	Bukit Piatu	137/15/09	SM Teknik Melaka
Ayer Keroh（N16）	Sungai Putat	137/16/01	SMK Tun Mutahir; SMK Munshi Abdullah
Ayer Keroh（N16）	Kampung Ayer Keroh	137/16/02	SK Tun Syed Ahmad Shahabudin
Ayer Keroh（N16）	Ayer Keroh Heights	137/16/03	SRA (JAIM) Ayer Keroh
Ayer Keroh（N16）	Taman Kerjasama	137/16/04	Pusat Rujukan Sosial (KRT) Taman Kerjasama; Padang Pusat Sebaran Maklumat Nasional (NADI) Taman Bukit Beruang Utama
Ayer Keroh（N16）	Taman Bukit Melaka	137/16/05	Dewan MPHTJ Bukit Beruang
Ayer Keroh（N16）	Taman Bunga Raya	137/16/06	SJK (C) Bukit Beruang
Ayer Keroh（N16）	Taman Muzaffar Shah	137/16/07	SK Ayer Keroh
Ayer Keroh（N16）	Kampung Tun Razak	137/16/08	SR Arab (JAIM) Kampung Tun Razak; SR Arab (JAIM) Tun Razak
Bukit Katil（N17）	Bukit Beruang	137/17/01	SMK Bukit Baru; SK Bukit Beruang
Bukit Katil（N17）	Padang Jambu	137/17/02	SRA (JAIM) Padang Jambu
Bukit Katil（N17）	Bukit Baru Dalam	137/17/03	SJK (C) Keh Seng
Bukit Katil（N17）	Paya Ikan	137/17/04	SK Jalan Datuk Palembang
Bukit Katil（N17）	Bukit Pulau	137/17/05	SRA (JAIM) Ar Rahman, Bukit Pulau
Bukit Katil（N17）	Kampungku Sayang	137/17/06	SK Bukit Baru
Bukit Katil（N17）	Taman Tun Rahah	137/17/07	SK Kampung Tun Razak; Kolej Vokasional Melaka Tengah
Bukit Katil（N17）	Kampung Bukit Katil	137/17/08	SK Dato' Demang Hussin; SMK Bukit Katil
Ayer Molek (N18）	Pengkalan Minyak	137/18/01	SRA (JAIM) Taman Desa Molek
Ayer Molek (N18）	Tambak Paya	137/18/02	SK Tambak Paya
Ayer Molek (N18）	Kg Ayer Molek	137/18/03	SK Ayer Molek
Ayer Molek (N18）	Bukit Lintang	137/18/04	SK Bukit Lintang
Ayer Molek (N18）	Kandang	137/18/05	SK Bendahara Seri Maharaja
Ayer Molek (N18）	Tiang Dua	137/18/06	SJK (C) Tiang Dua
Ayer Molek (N18）	Paya Dalam	137/18/07	SK Paya Dalam

=== Representation history ===
Members of Parliament for Hang Tuah Jaya
Parliament	No	Years	Member	Party	Vote Share
Constituency created, renamed from Bukit Katil
14th	P137	2018–2022	Shamsul Iskandar Mohd Akin (شمس الإسكندر محمد عقين)	PH (PKR)	39,067; 51.01%
15th	P137	2022–present	Adam Adli Abd Halim (آدم عدلي عبدالحليم)	PH (PKR)	39,418; 41.72%

=== State constituency ===
Parliamentary constituency	State constituency						
Parliamentary constituency	1955–59*	1959–1974	1974–1986	1986–1995	1995–2004	2004–2018	2018–present
Hang Tuah Jaya							Ayer Keroh
Hang Tuah Jaya							Ayer Molek
Hang Tuah Jaya							Bukit Katil
Hang Tuah Jaya							Pengkalan Batu

=== Historical boundaries ===
State Constituency	Area
State Constituency	2018
Ayer Keroh	Ayer Keroh; Batu Berendam; Bukit Beruang; Kampung Tun Razak; Sungai Putat
Ayer Molek	Ayer Molek; Bukit Lintang; Bukit Nibong; Kandang; Paya Dalam
Bukit Katil	Bukit Baru; Bukit Katil; Padang Jambu; Taman Desa Baru; Taman Penghulu Jabar
Pengkalan Batu	Bachang; Bukit Piatu; Kampung Mata Kuching; Pengkalan Batu; Peringgit

=== Current state assembly members ===
No.	State Constituency	Member	Coalition (Party)
N15	Pengkalan Batu	Siti Aisyah Mahmood	BN (UMNO)
N16	Ayer Keroh	Kerk Chee Yee	PH (DAP)
N17	Bukit Katil	Ridzuan Sarif	PN (PAS)
N18	Ayer Molek	Mohd Ridhwan Mohd Ali	BN (UMNO)

=== Local governments & postcodes ===
No.	State Constituency	Local Government	Postcode
N15	Pengkalan Batu	Malacca City Council (Peringgit area); Hang Tuah Jaya Municipal Council	75150, 75300, 75350, 75400, 75450, 75460 Melaka; 77200 Bemban
N16	Ayer Keroh	Hang Tuah Jaya Municipal Council	75150, 75300, 75350, 75400, 75450, 75460 Melaka; 77200 Bemban
N17	Bukit Katil	Malacca City Council (Bukit Baru area); Hang Tuah Jaya Municipal Council	75150, 75300, 75350, 75400, 75450, 75460 Melaka; 77200 Bemban
N18	Ayer Molek	Malacca City Council; Jasin Municipal Council (Paya Dalam area)	75150, 75300, 75350, 75400, 75450, 75460 Melaka; 77200 Bemban

== Election results ==
Malaysian general election, 2022
Party	Candidate	Votes	%	∆%
PH	Adam Adli Abd Halim	39,418	41.72	▲41.72
BN	Mohd Ridhwan Mohd Ali	30,780	32.58	▼7.14
PN	Mohd Azrudin Md Idris	23,549	24.92	▲24.92
PEJUANG	Sheikh Ikhzan Sheikh Salleh	739	0.78	▲0.78
Total valid votes		94,486	100.00	
Total rejected ballots		737		
Unreturned ballots		369		
Turnout		95,592	79.74	▼7.27
Registered electors		118,493		
Majority		8,638	9.14	▼2.14
PH hold		Swing		
Source(s) https://lom.agc.gov.my/ilims/upload/portal/akta/outputp/1753258/PUB%20616%20PARLIMEN%20MELAKA.pdf

Malaysian general election, 2018
Party	Candidate	Votes	%
PKR	Shamsul Iskandar Mohd Akin	39,067	51.01
BN	Mohd Ali Rustam	30,427	39.73
PAS	Md Khalid Kassim	7,089	9.26
Total valid votes		76,583	100.00
Total rejected ballots		909	
Unreturned ballots		266	
Turnout		77,758	87.01
Registered electors		89,364	
Majority		8,640	11.28
This was a new constituency created.
Source(s) "His Majesty's Government Gazette - Notice of Contested Election, Parliament for the State of Malacca [P.U. (B) 243/2018]" (PDF). Attorney General's Chambers of Malaysia. 3 May 2018. "Federal Government Gazette - Results of Contested Election and Statements of the Poll after the Official Addition of Votes, Parliamentary Constituencies for the State of Malacca [P.U. (B) 317/2018]" (PDF). Attorney General's Chambers of Malaysia. 28 May 2018. Archived from the original (PDF) on 2019-12-29.
