= Ayer Molek (state constituency) =

Political subdivision in Malaysia

Coordinates: 2°12′24.8″N 102°18′22.6″E

Ayer Molek (N18)
Malacca constituency

State constituency
- Legislature: Malacca State Legislative Assembly
MLA
Mohd Ridhwan Mohd Ali
BN
- Constituency created: 1974
- First contested: 1974
- Last contested: 2026

Demographics
- Electors (2026): 24,614

N18 Ayer Molek within Malacca, as used for the 2021 state election

Ayer Molek is a state constituency in Malacca, Malaysia, that has been represented in the Melaka State Legislative Assembly.

== Demographics ==
Ethnic breakdown of Ayer Molek's electorate as of 2026
1. Malays (87.7%)
2. Chinese (7.00%)
3. Indians (4.30%)
4. Other Ethnicities (1.10%)

== History ==
=== Polling districts ===
According to the federal gazette issued on 5 November 2026, the Ayer Molek constituency is divided into 7 polling districts.

State constituency	Polling District	Code	Location
Ayer Molek (N18）	Pengkalan Minyak	137/18/01	SRA (JAIM) Taman Desa Molek
Ayer Molek (N18）	Tambak Paya	137/18/02	SK Tambak Paya
Ayer Molek (N18）	Kg Ayer Molek	137/18/03	SK Ayer Molek
Ayer Molek (N18）	Bukit Lintang	137/18/04	SK Bukit Lintang
Ayer Molek (N18）	Kandang	137/18/05	SK Bendahara Seri Maharaja
Ayer Molek (N18）	Tiang Dua	137/18/06	SJK (C) Tiang Dua
Ayer Molek (N18）	Paya Dalam	137/18/07	SK Paya Dalam

=== Representation history ===
Members of the Legislative Assembly for Ayer Molek
Assembly	No	Years	Member	Party
Constituency created from Kandang
4th	N13	1974-1978	Mohamed Di Abdul Ghani	BN (UMNO)
5th	N13	1978-1982	Mohamed Di Abdul Ghani	BN (UMNO)
6th	N13	1982-1986	Mohd. Tamrin Abdul Ghafar	BN (UMNO)
7th	N09	1986-1990	Mohd Ali Rustam	BN (UMNO)
8th	N09	1990-1995	As'ari Ibrahim	BN (UMNO)
9th	N15	1995 – 1999	As'ari Ibrahim	BN (UMNO)
10th	N15	1999 – 2004	Momin Abdul Aziz	BN (UMNO)
11th	N18	2004 – 2008	Md. Yunos Husin	BN (UMNO)
12th	N18	2008 – 2013	Md. Yunos Husin	BN (UMNO)
13th	N18	2013 – 2018	Md. Yunos Husin	BN (UMNO)
14th	N18	2018 – 2021	Rahmad Mariman	BN (UMNO)
15th	N18	2021–2026	Rahmad Mariman	BN (UMNO)
16th	N18	2026-present	Mohd Ridhwan Mohd Ali	BN (UMNO)

== Election results ==
Malacca state election, 2026
Party	Candidate	Votes	%	∆%
BN	Mohd Ridhwan Mohd Ali	16,312	83.58	▲32.51
PH	Muhammad Hakimin Mokhtar	3,204	16.42	▼3.26
Total valid votes		19,516	100.00	
Total rejected ballots		132		
Unreturned ballots		29		
Turnout		19,677	79.94	▲8.65
Registered electors		24,614		
Majority		13,108	67.16	▲44.62
BN hold		Swing		
Source(s) https://electiondata.my/elections/mlk/SE-16/

Malacca state election, 2021
Party	Candidate	Votes	%	∆%
BN	Rahmad Mariman	6,348	51.07	▲5.51
PN	Mohd Fadly Samin	3,546	28.53	▲28.53
PH	Rafee Ibrahim	2,446	19.68	▲19.68
Independent	Ahmad Muaz Idris	90	0.72	▲0.72
Total valid votes		12,430	100.00	
Total rejected ballots		275		
Unreturned ballots		30		
Turnout		12,739	71.29	▼16.34
Registered electors		17,863		
Majority		2,802	22.54	▲10.71
BN hold		Swing		
Source(s) https://lom.agc.gov.my/ilims/upload/portal/akta/outputp/1715764/PUB%20583.pdf

Malacca state election, 2018
Party	Candidate	Votes	%	∆%
BN	Rahmad Mariman	6,951	45.56	▼18.12
PKR	Farhan Ibrahim @ Alias	5,146	33.73	▲33.73
PAS	Jantan Abdullah	3,082	20.20	▼16.13
Independent	Kamarolzaman Mohd Jidi	79	0.52	▲0.52
Total valid votes		15,258	100.00	
Total rejected ballots		197		
Unreturned ballots		58		
Turnout		15,513	87.63	▼2.26
Registered electors		17,703		
Majority		1,805	11.83	▼15.52
BN hold		Swing		
Source(s) "14th General Election Malaysia (GE14 / PRU14) - Malacca". The Star.

Malacca state election, 2013
Party	Candidate	Votes	%	∆%
BN	Md. Yunos Husin	8,756	63.68	▼0.10
PAS	Md Khairi Abd Aziz	4,995	36.32	▲0.10
Total valid votes		13,751	100.00	
Total rejected ballots		202		
Unreturned ballots		29		
Turnout		13,982	89.89	▲5.65
Registered electors		15,554		
Majority		3,761	27.35	▼0.20
BN hold		Swing		

Malacca state election, 2008
Party	Candidate	Votes	%	∆%
BN	Md. Yunos Husin	6,433	63.78	▼7.19
PAS	Salim H Tahir	3,654	36.22	▲7.19
Total valid votes		10,087	100.00	
Total rejected ballots		170		
Unreturned ballots		34		
Turnout		10,291	84.24	▼0.84
Registered electors		12,216		
Majority		2,779	27.55	▼14.39
BN hold		Swing		

Malacca state election, 2004
Party	Candidate	Votes	%	∆%
BN	Md. Yunos Husin	6,527	70.97	▲14.84
PAS	Md. Yasin Abd. Ghani	2,670	29.03	▼14.84
Total valid votes		9,197	100.00	
Total rejected ballots		181		
Unreturned ballots		19		
Turnout		9,397	85.09	▲4.70
Registered electors		11,044		
Majority		3,857	41.94	▲29.67
BN hold		Swing		

Malacca state election, 1999
Party	Candidate	Votes	%	∆%
BN	Momin Abdul Aziz (Jenal Lajis)	7,429	56.13	▼22.81
PAS	Md. Yasin Abd. Ghani	5,806	43.87	▲22.81
Total valid votes		13,235	100.00	
Total rejected ballots		257		
Unreturned ballots		19		
Turnout		13,511	80.39	▲2.05
Registered electors		16,807		
Majority		1,623	12.26	▼45.62
BN hold		Swing		

Malacca state election, 1995
Party	Candidate	Votes	%	∆%
BN	Momin Abdul Aziz	9,403	78.94	▲9.77
PAS	Salleh Yusof	2,508	21.06	▼9.77
Total valid votes		11,911	100.00	
Total rejected ballots		253		
Unreturned ballots		30		
Turnout		12,194	78.34	▼2.13
Registered electors		15,566		
Majority		6,895	57.89	▲19.53
BN hold		Swing		

Malacca state election, 1990
Party	Candidate	Votes	%	∆%
BN	As'ari Ibrahim	10,612	69.18	▼10.53
PAS	Jaliluddin Abd. Wahid	4,728	30.82	▲10.53
Total valid votes		15,340	100.00	
Total rejected ballots		634		
Unreturned ballots		61		
Turnout		16,035	80.47	▲5.09
Registered electors		19,927		
Majority		5,884	38.36	▼21.05
BN hold		Swing		

Malacca state election, 1986
Party	Candidate	Votes	%	∆%
BN	Mohd. Ali Mohd. Rustam	9,484	79.70	
PAS	Hussain Kasim	2,415	20.30	
Total valid votes		11,899	100.00	
Total rejected ballots		534		
Unreturned ballots		0		
Turnout		12,433	75.38	▲75.38
Registered electors		16,494		
Majority		7,069	59.41	▲59.41
BN hold		Swing		

Malacca state election, 1982
Party	Candidate	Votes	%	∆%
On the nomination day, Mohd Tamrin Abdul Ghafar won uncontested.
BN	Mohd Tamrin Abdul Ghafar			
Total valid votes				
Total rejected ballots				
Unreturned ballots				
Turnout				
Registered electors		9,243		
Majority				
BN hold		Swing		

Malacca state election, 1978
Party	Candidate	Votes	%	∆%
BN	Md Di Ab Ghani	5,098	81.02	▲2.88
PAS	Ahmad Jantan	1,194	18.98	▲18.98
Total valid votes		6,292	100.00	
Total rejected ballots		125		
Unreturned ballots		0		
Turnout		6,417	77.74	▼2.39
Registered electors		8,254		
Majority		3,904	62.05	▲5.77
BN hold		Swing		

Malacca state election, 1974
Party	Candidate	Votes	%
BN	Md Di Ab Ghani	4,025	78.14
Parti Sosialis Rakyat Malaysia	Sidek Ahmad	1,126	21.86
Total valid votes		5,151	100.00
Total rejected ballots		375	
Unreturned ballots		0	
Turnout		5,526	80.13
Registered electors		6,896	
Majority		2,899	56.28
This was a new constituency created.
