= Political Secretary (Malaysia) =

Constitutional office in Malaysia

Political Secretary (Malay: Setiausaha Politik) is a constitutional office in Malaysia. As a member of the Federal Government, a Political Secretary is appointed by the Prime Minister either on his own choice or on the advice of a Minister.

== Duties and responsibilities ==
There has been no clear description of duties and responsibilities of a Political Secretary. In general, however, a Political Secretary is tasked to assist political duties of a Minister and provide the latter with appropriate advice on political situations in such constituency, such state or Malaysia at large. Chief Political Secretary to the Chief Minister of Sarawak, Abdullah Saidol explained that a Political Secretary is expected to heed, support and inform to the people, development policies and programmes planned by the Government.

== Political secretaries to the Anwar Ibrahim cabinet ==
As of 27 January 2023, the following individuals have been appointed as political secretaries to the Anwar Ibrahim cabinet. They have served since December 2022. Presently, there have been 38 political secretaries serving the Prime Minister, Deputy Prime Ministers and Ministers.

| Portfolio | Officeholders | Took offices | Left offices |
|---|---|---|---|
| Senior Political Advisor to Prime Minister | Tengku Zafrul Aziz | 4 March 2026 | Incumbent |
| Political Secretary to Prime Minister | Chan Ming Kai | 1 December 2022 | Incumbent |
| Political Secretary to Prime Minister | Ahmad Farhan Fauzi | 23 December 2022 | Incumbent |
| Political Secretary to Prime Minister | Azman Abidin | 6 January 2023 | Incumbent |
| Political Secretary to Deputy Prime Minister 1 | Jamal Norubit Nerubi | 6 January 2023 | Incumbent |
| Political Secretary to Deputy Prime Minister 1 | Megat Zulkarnain Omardin | December 2022/January 2023 | Incumbent |
| Political Secretary to Deputy Prime Minister 2 | Irwan Zulkarnain Hasbie | December 2022/January 2023 | Incumbent |
| Political Secretary to Deputy Prime Minister 2 | Mikai Mandau | December 2022/January 2023 | Incumbent |
| Political Secretary to Minister of Rural and Regional Development | Mohd Razlan Muhamad Rafi | 6 January 2023 | Incumbent |
| Political Secretary to Minister of Plantation and Commodities | Nora'shekin Yusof | 21 January 2026 | Incumbent |
| Political Secretary to Minister of Energy Transition and Water Transformation | Hamzah Brahim | 27 January 2023 | Incumbent |
| Political Secretary to Minister of Finance | Muhammad Kamil Abdul Munim | 27 January 2023 | Incumbent |
| Political Secretary to Minister of Works | Alvin Runggah | 6 February 2026 | Incumbent |
| Political Secretary to Minister of Education | Rozana Zainal Abidin | 10 July 2025 | Incumbent |
| Political Secretary to Minister of Transport | Ho Weng Wah | September 2023 | Incumbent |
| Political Secretary to Minister of Foreign Affairs | Ton Zalani Mat Darus | 27 January 2023 | Incumbent |
| Political Secretary to Minister of Human Resources | Aizuddin Abd Gaffal | 21 January 2025 | Incumbent |
| Political Secretary to Minister of Consumer Affairs and Domestic Trade | Mohammad Ghazali Hajiji | 6 January 2023 | Incumbent |
| Political Secretary to Minister of Agriculture and Food Security | Yuhaizad Abdullah | 27 January 2023 | Incumbent |
| Political Secretary to Minister of Natural Resources and Environment Sustainability | Willy Rafiqi | 21 January 2025 | Incumbent |
| Political Secretary to Minister of Home Affairs | Omar Mokhtar | 22 September 2025 | Incumbent |
| Political Secretary to Minister of International Trade and Industry | Zainuri Zainal | 21 January 2025 | Incumbent |
| Political Secretary to Minister of Defence | Mohammad Khairi A. Malik | 6 January 2023 | Incumbent |
| Political Secretary to Minister of Higher Education | Ahmad Zharif Ahmad Kamal | 27 January 2023 | Incumbent |
| Political Secretary to Minister of Women, Family and Community Development | Mohammed Kamaluddin Effendie | December 2022/January 2023 | Incumbent |
| Political Secretary to Minister of Communication | Abdullah Izhar Yusof | December 2022/January 2023 | Incumbent |
| Political Secretary to Minister of Housing and Local Government | Chaw Kam Foon | February 2024 | Incumbent |
| Political Secretary to Minister of Digital | Michelle Ng | 6 June 2025 | Incumbent |
| Political Secretary to Minister of Health | Faisal Ismail | February 2024 | Incumbent |
| Political Secretary to Minister of Federal Territories | Yap Yee Vonne | 21 January 2025 | Incumbent |
| Political Secretary to Minister of National Unity | Stephen William | 27 January 2023 | Incumbent |
| Political Secretary to Minister of Science, Technology and Innovation | Ooi Tze Min | December 2022/January 2023 | Incumbent |
| Political Secretary to Minister of Economy | Mohd Hafiz Mohamad | 21 January 2025 | Incumbent |
| Political Secretary to Minister of Foreign Affairs | Akmal Zharif Ahmad Kamal | 27 January 2023 | Incumbent |
| Political Secretary to Minister of Law and Institutional Reforms | Shahril Zaman Abdul Wahab | 26 August 2026 | Incumbent |
| Political Secretary to Minister of Tourism, Arts and Culture | Sue Chee Tong | Unknown | Incumbent |
| Political Secretary to Minister of Entrepreneurship Development and Cooperative | Kelvin Yii | 21 January 2025 | Incumbent |
| Political Secretary to Minister of Youth and Sports | Mohammad Afiq Hazwan Samsudin | 21 January 2025 | Incumbent |
| Political Secretary to Minister of Religious Affairs | Mohd Kamarul Arifin Mohd Wafa | 21 January 2025 | Incumbent |
| Political Secretary to Minister of Sabah and Sarawak Affairs | Ahmad Nazib Johari | 21 January 2025 | Incumbent |

== Political secretaries to the Ismail Sabri cabinet ==
The following individuals were appointed as political secretaries to the Ismail Sabri cabinet. They served from September or November 2021 to the dissolution of the cabinet in November 2022. There were 32 political secretaries serving the Prime Minister, Senior Ministers and Ministers.

| Portfolio | Office holder | Took offices | Left offices |
|---|---|---|---|
| Prime Minister's Political Secretary | Syed Mohd Fahmi Sayid Mohammad | 27 September 2021 / November 2021 | 24 November 2022 |
| Prime Minister's Political Secretary | Mohammad Anuar Mohd Yunus | 27 September 2021 / November 2021 | 24 November 2022 |
| Prime Minister's Political Secretary | Khairulnizam bin Mohamad Zuldin | 27 September 2021 / November 2021 | 24 November 2022 |
| Political Secretary to Senior Minister, Ministry of International Trade and Industry | Muhammad Hilman Idham | 27 September 2021 / November 2021 | 24 November 2022 |
| Political Secretary to Senior Minister, Ministry of Defence | Abd Halim bin Abd Jalil | 27 September 2021 / November 2021 | 24 November 2022 |
| Political Secretary to Minister of Finance | Haji Rizam bin Haji Ismail | 27 September 2021 / November 2021 | 24 November 2022 |
| Political Secretary to Senior Minister, Ministry of Works | Hamzah Brahim | 27 September 2021 / November 2021 | 24 November 2022 |
| Political Secretary to Senior Minister, Ministry of Education | Fadli Hafiz Mohd Yusoff | 27 September 2021 / November 2021 | 24 November 2022 |
| Political Secretary to Minister of Transport | Ling Tian Soon | 27 September 2021 / November 2021 | 24 November 2022 |
| Political Secretary to Minister of Human Resources | Khamarulazlan Mohamad Hanafiah | 27 September 2021 / November 2021 | 24 November 2022 |
| Political Secretary to Minister of Sabah and Sarawak Affairs | Jonnybone J. Kurum | 27 September 2021 / November 2021 | 24 November 2022 |
| Political Secretary to Minister of Agriculture and Food Industries | Zulkifli bin Mohd Alwi | 27 September 2021 / November 2021 | 24 November 2022 |
| Political Secretary to Minister of Environment and Water | Dr. Mohd. Zuhdi Marsuki | 27 September 2021 / November 2021 | 24 November 2022 |
| Political Secretary to Minister of Home Affairs | Mohamed Farid bin Mohamed Zawawi | 27 September 2021 / November 2021 | 24 November 2022 |
| Political Secretary to Minister of Domestic Trade and Consumer Affairs | - | 27 September 2021 / November 2021 | 24 November 2022 |
| Political Secretary to Minister of Energy and Natural Resources | Mohd Syahir bin Che Sulaiman | 27 September 2021 / November 2021 | 24 November 2022 |
| Political Secretary to Minister of Higher Education | Shah Headan Ayoob Hussain Shah | 27 September 2021 / November 2021 | 24 November 2022 |
| Political Secretary to Minister of Women, Family and Community Development | Mohd Ariffin bin Mohd Razid | 27 September 2021 / November 2021 | 24 November 2022 |
| Political Secretary to Minister of Communications and Multimedia | Budiman Mohd Zohdi | 27 September 2021 / November 2021 | 24 November 2022 |
| Political Secretary to Minister of Housing and Local Government | Ahmad Darus | 27 September 2021 / November 2021 | 24 November 2022 |
| Political Secretary to Minister of Health | Megat Firdouz Megat Junid | 27 September 2021 / November 2021 | 24 November 2022 |
| Political Secretary to Minister of National Unity | Haliza Abdullah | 27 September 2021 / November 2021 | 24 November 2022 |
| Political Secretary to Minister of Science, Technology and Innovation | Norshida Ibrahim | 27 September 2021 / November 2021 | 24 November 2022 |
| Political Secretary to Minister for the Economy | Zahari Kechik | 27 September 2021 / November 2021 | 24 November 2022 |
| Political Secretary to Minister of Foreign Affairs | Muhammad Mujahidin Zulkifli | 27 September 2021 / November 2021 | 24 November 2022 |
| Political Secretary to Minister of Plantation Industries and Commodities | Nor Hizwan Ahmad | 27 September 2021 / November 2021 | 24 November 2022 |
| Political Secretary to Minister for Special Functions | Muhammad Islahuddin bin Abas | 27 September 2021 / November 2021 | 24 November 2022 |
| Political Secretary to Minister for Parliament and Law | Syed Hamzah Syed Paie | 27 September 2021 / November 2021 | 24 November 2022 |
| Political Secretary to Minister of Tourism, Arts and Culture | Mohammed Kamaluddin Hj. Mohd Effendie | 27 September 2021 / November 2021 | 24 November 2022 |
| Political Secretary to Minister of Rural Development | Muhamad Nur Aizat bin Noor Azam | 27 September 2021 / November 2021 | 24 November 2022 |
| Political Secretary to Minister of Entrepreneurship Development and Cooperative | Kamaruzzaman bin Johari | 27 September 2021 / November 2021 | 24 November 2022 |
| Political Secretary to Minister of Federal Territories | - | 27 September 2021 / November 2021 | 24 November 2022 |
| Political Secretary to Minister of Youth and Sports | Mohd Hafez Mubin bin Mohd Salleh | 27 September 2021 / November 2021 | 24 November 2022 |
| Political Secretary to Minister for Religious Affairs | Wan Rohimi Wan Daud | 27 September 2021 / November 2021 | 24 November 2022 |

=== State level ===
State governments have appointed Political Secretaries as well. Appointment of state political secretaries, however, determined by the state through enactments and decisions of state executive council or cabinet. Roles and responsibilities of a state political secretary is similar to those of a federal political secretary.

==== Peninsular Malaysia ====
In states of Peninsular Malaysia, a Political Secretary is appointed by the head of respective State Government and serves political affairs of the latter only.

==== Sabah ====
In Sabah, each Minister is provided with a Political Secretary appointed by the Chief Minister on the advice of such Minister. Only Chief Minister can appoint up to four Political Secretaries for himself.

==== Sarawak ====
Premier Abang Johari Openg has 32 political secretaries all over Sarawak.
