= Mohd Ridhwan Mohd Ali =

Malaysian politician

Yang Berhormat Datuk Mohd Ridhwan Mohd Ali PGDK MLA
- محمد رضوان محمد علي

Member of the Malacca State Legislative Assembly for Ayer Molek
- Incumbent
- Assumed office 14 November 2026
- Preceded by: Rahmad Mariman (BN–UMNO)
- Majority: 13,108 (2026)

Senator

Appointed by the Yang di-Pertuan Agong
- In office 21 March 2022 – 3 November 2022
- Monarch: Abdullah
- Prime Minister: Ismail Sabri Yaakob (2021–2022)

Faction represented in Melaka State Legislative Assembly
- 2026-: Barisan Nasional

Personal details
- Born: 1986 (age 39–40) Bukit Katil, Malacca, Malaysia
- Citizenship: Malaysia
- Party: United Malays National Organisation (UMNO)
- Other political affiliations: Barisan Nasional (BN)
- Spouse: Dr. Nur Azieha Mohd Ali
- Parents: Ali Rustam (father); Asmah Abdul Rahman (mother)
- Occupation: Politician

Mohd Ridhwan Mohd Ali (born 1986) is a Malaysian politician who currently serve as Member of the Melaka State Legislative Assembly (MLA) for Ayer Molek since November 2026. He previously served as a Senator in 2022. He was appointed by the Yang di-Pertuan Agong on 21 March 2022 after being nominated by then-Prime Minister of Malaysia Ismail Sabri Yaakob.

== Election results ==
Parliament of Malaysia
Year	Constituency	Candidate	Votes	Pct	Opponent(s)	Votes	Pct	Ballots cast	Majority	Turnout
2022	P137 Hang Tuah Jaya	Mohd Ridhwan Mohd Ali (UMNO)	30,780	32.58%	Adam Adli Abd Halim (PKR)	39,418	41.72%	94,486	8,638	79.74%
2022	P137 Hang Tuah Jaya	Mohd Ridhwan Mohd Ali (UMNO)	30,780	32.58%	Mohd Azrudin Md Idris (BERSATU)	23,549	24.92%	94,486	8,638	79.74%
2022	P137 Hang Tuah Jaya	Mohd Ridhwan Mohd Ali (UMNO)	30,780	32.58%	Sheikh Ikhzan Sheikh Salleh (PEJUANG)	739	0.78%	94,486	8,638	79.74%

Malacca State Legislative Assembly
Year	Constituency	Candidate	Votes	Pct	Opponent(s)	Votes	Pct	Ballots cast	Majority	Turnout
2026	N18 Ayer Molek	Mohd Ridhwan Mohd Ali (UMNO)	16,312	83.58%	Muhammad Hakimin Mokhtar (PKR)	3,204	16.42%	19,516	13,108	79.94%

== Honours ==
- Malaysia
- Sabah
  - Commander of the Order of Kinabalu (PGDK) – Datuk (2021)

== See also ==
- Members of the Dewan Negara, 14th Malaysian Parliament
