= Pengkalan Batu (state constituency) =

State constituency in Malacca, Malaysia

Pengkalan Batu (N15)
Malacca constituency

State constituency
- Legislature: Malacca State Legislative Assembly
MLA
Siti Aisyah Mahmood
BN
- Constituency created: 2018
- First contested: 2018
- Last contested: 2026

Demographics
- Electors (2026): 25,948
- Area (km²): 11

N15 Pengkalan Batu within Malacca, as used for the 2021 state election

Pengkalan Batu is a state constituency in Malacca, Malaysia, that has been represented in the Malacca State Legislative Assembly.

The state constituency was first contested in 2018 and is mandated to return a single Assemblyman to the Malacca State Legislative Assembly under the first-past-the-post voting system. Since 2021, the State Assemblyman for Pengkalan Batu is Kalsom Noordin from United Malays National Organisation (UMNO) which is part of the state's ruling coalition, Barisan Nasional (BN).

The state constituency was first contested under the name of Bachang but was renamed to Pengkalan Batu for the 2018 election.

== Definition ==
The Pengkalan Batu constituency contains the polling districts of Bachang Baru, Pasir Puteh, Pengkalan Batu, Rumpun Bahagia, Peringgit, Peringgit Jaya, Bukit Palah, Seri Siantan and Bukit Piatu.

== Demographics ==
Ethnic breakdown of Pengkalan Batu's electorate as of 2026
1. Malay (64.8%)
2. Chinese (27.6%)
3. Indian (5.70%)
4. Other ethnicities (1.70%)

== History ==
=== Polling districts ===
According to the federal gazette issued on 5 November 2026, the Pengkalan Batu constituency is divided into 9 polling districts.

State constituency	Polling District	Code	Location
Pengkalan Batu（N15）	Bachang Baru	137/15/01	Kompleks JAPERUN DUN Bachang
Pengkalan Batu（N15）	Pasir Puteh	137/15/02	SJK (C) Yu Hwa
Pengkalan Batu（N15）	Pengkalan Batu	137/15/03	SMA Sultan Muhammad
Pengkalan Batu（N15）	Rumpun Bahagia	137/15/04	Balai Raya Taman Rumpun Bahagia
Pengkalan Batu（N15）	Peringgit	137/15/05	SK Peringgit
Pengkalan Batu（N15）	Peringgit Jaya	137/15/06	Dewan Terbuka Taman Seri Cempaka
Pengkalan Batu（N15）	Bukit Palah	137/15/07	SRA (JAIM) Peringgit
Pengkalan Batu（N15）	Seri Siantan	137/15/08	SRA (JAIM) Solok Musai
Pengkalan Batu（N15）	Bukit Piatu	137/15/09	SM Teknik Melaka

=== Representation history ===
Members of the Legislative Assembly for Pengkalan Batu
Assembly	No	Years	Member	Party
Constituency created from Bachang
14th	N15	2018 - 2020	Norhizam Hassan Baktee	PH (DAP)
14th	N15	2020 - 2021	Norhizam Hassan Baktee	Independent
15th	N15	2021 – 2026	Kalsom Noordin	BN (UMNO)
16th	N15	2026 – present	Siti Aisyah Mahmood	BN (UMNO)

== Election results ==
Malacca state election, 2026
Party	Candidate	Votes	%	∆%
BN	Siti Aisyah Mahmood	11,836	62.93	▲27.16
PH	Jason Tze-Xi Nathan	5,478	29.13	▼5.67
BERSATU	Norhizam Hassan Baktee	876	4.66	▲4.66
BERSAMA	Goh Han Koon	618	3.29	▲3.29
Total valid votes		18,808		
Total rejected ballots		192		
Unreturned ballots		22		
Turnout		19,022	73.30	▲6.81
Registered electors		25,948		
Majority		6,358	33.80	▲32.83
BN hold		Swing		
Source(s) https://electiondata.my/elections/mlk/SE-16/

Malacca state election, 2021
Party	Candidate	Votes	%	∆%
BN	Kalsom Noordin	4,839	35.77	▼0.32
PH	Muhamad Danish Zainudin	4,708	34.80	▲34.80
PN	Muhammad Azrudin Mat Idris	2,681	19.82	▲19.82
Independent	Norhizam Hassan Baktee	1,218	9.06	▲9.06
PUTRA	Mohd Aluwi Sari	82	0.61	▲0.61
Total valid votes		13,528		
Total rejected ballots		261		
Unreturned ballots		55		
Turnout		13,844	66.49	▼19.77
Registered electors		20,821		
Majority		131	0.97	▼14.41
BN gain from PKR		Swing		?
Source(s) https://lom.agc.gov.my/ilims/upload/portal/akta/outputp/1715764/PUB%20583.pdf

Malacca state election, 2018
Party	Candidate	Votes	%
PKR	Norhizam Hassan Baktee	9,227	51.47
BN	Chua Lian Chye	6,471	36.09
PAS	Ramli Dalip	2,230	12.44
Total valid votes		17,928	100.00
Total rejected ballots		274	
Unreturned ballots		70	
Turnout		18,272	86.26
Registered electors		21,182	
Majority		2,756	15.38
This was a new constituency created.
