= Zaidi Attan =

Malaysian politician

Yang Berbahagia Datuk Zaidi Attan DMSM PJK
- زيدي بن اتن

Deputy Member of the Malacca State Executive Council
- Incumbent
- Assumed office 6 April 2023 (Tourism, Heritage, Arts and Culture)
- Governor: Mohd Ali Rustam
- Chief Minister: Ab Rauf Yusoh
- Member: Abdul Razak Abdul Rahman
- Constituency: Serkam
- In office 14 May 2013 – 11 May 2018 (Public Works, Public Amenities, Transport and Project Restoration)
- Governor: Mohd Khalil Yaakob
- Chief Minister: Idris Haron
- Member: Abdul Ghafar Atan; Lim Ban Hong (2014–2018)
- Preceded by: Hasan Abd Rahman (Public Works and Public Amenities); Lai Meng Chong (Transport); Abdul Wahab Abdul Latip (Project Restoration)
- Succeeded by: Position abolished
- Constituency: Serkam

Member of the Malacca State Executive Council
- In office 26 November 2021 – 31 March 2023 (Housing, Local Government and Environment)
- Governor: Mohd Ali Rustam
- Chief Minister: Sulaiman Md Ali
- Preceded by: Abdul Ghafar Atan
- Succeeded by: Rais Yasin (Senior Member, Housing and Local Government); Portfolio abolished (Environment)
- Constituency: Serkam

Member of the Melaka State Legislative Assembly for Serkam
- In office 5 May 2013 – 14 November 2026
- Preceded by: Ghazale Muhamad (BN–UMNO)
- Majority: 3,600 (2013); 2,737 (2018); 79 (2021)

Faction represented in Malacca State Legislative Assembly
- 2013–: Barisan Nasional

Personal details
- Born: Zaidi bin Attan; 4 October 1969 (age 57) Malacca, Malaysia
- Citizenship: Malaysian
- Party: United Malays National Organisation (UMNO)
- Other political affiliations: Barisan Nasional (BN)
- Occupation: Politician
- Zaidi Attan on Facebook

Zaidi bin Attan (born 4 October 1969) is a Malaysian politician who has served as Deputy Member of the Malacca State Executive Council (EXCO) in the Barisan Nasional (BN) state administration under Chief Minister Ab Rauf Yusoh and Member Abdul Razak Abdul Rahman since April 2023 for the second term and under former Chief Minister Idris Haron and former Members Abdul Ghafar Atan and Lim Ban Hong from May 2013 to the collapse of the BN administration in May 2018 for the first term. He also served as Member of the Malacca EXCO in the BN state administration under former Chief Minister Sulaiman Md Ali from November 2021 to March 2023. He has also served as Member of the Malacca State Legislative Assembly (MLA) for Serkam since May 2013. He is also the Deputy Chairman of Syarikat Air Melaka Berhad (SAMB). He is a member and Vice Division Chief of Jasin of the United Malays National Organisation (UMNO), a component party of the BN coalition. His appointment as a Deputy EXCO Member in April 2023 is a demotion as he was previously appointed an EXCO Member in November 2021. This has rarely happened in the Malaysian politics.

== Personal life and education ==
Zaidi had his primary education at a Chinese national type primary school (SJKC), a type of vernacular school in Malaysia. As a result, Zaidi is able to communicate in basic Chinese and sign his name in Chinese. Zaidi revealed that he was given a Chinese name '再利' (pinyin : zài lì), although the literal translation of his name to Chinese is '再迪' (pinyin : zài dí).

He continued his secondary education at Sekolah Menengah Teknik Melaka, Bukit Piatu and graduated in Bachelor of Electrical Engineering (BEng.) with honours from the University of Technology Malaysia.

== Election results ==
Malacca State Legislative Assembly
Year	Constituency	Candidate	Votes	Pct	Opponent(s)	Votes	Pct	Ballots cast	Majority	Turnout
2013	N26 Serkam	Zaidi Attan (UMNO)	8,715	63.02%	Kamarudin Sedik (PAS)	5,115	36.98%	14,015	3,600	90.40%
2018	N26 Serkam	Zaidi Attan (UMNO)	6,401	47.46%	Nor Khairi Yusof (AMANAH)	3,664	27.16%	13,722	2,737	87.10%
2018	N26 Serkam	Zaidi Attan (UMNO)	6,401	47.46%	Ahmad Bilal Rahudin (PAS)	3,423	25.38%	13,722	2,737	87.10%
2021	N26 Serkam	Zaidi Attan (UMNO)	5,038	43.31%	Ahmad Bilal Rahudin (PAS)	4,959	42.64%	11,631	79	72.80%
2021	N26 Serkam	Zaidi Attan (UMNO)	5,038	43.31%	Mohd Khomeini Kamal (AMANAH)	1,535	13.20%	11,631	79	72.80%
2021	N26 Serkam	Zaidi Attan (UMNO)	5,038	43.31%	Norazlanshah Hazali (IND)	99	0.85%	11,631	79	72.80%

== Honours ==
- Malacca
  - Companion of the Exalted Order of Malacca (DMSM) – Datuk (2015)
  - Recipient of the Meritorious Service Medal (PJK) (2005)
