= Jasin (federal constituency) =

Federal constituency of Malacca, Malaysia

Jasin (P139)
Malacca constituency

Federal constituency
- Legislature: Dewan Rakyat
- MP: Zulkifli Ismail; PN
- Constituency created: 1974
- First contested: 1974
- Last contested: 2022

Demographics
- Population (2020): 134,531
- Electors (2026): 101,277
- Area (km²): 479
- Pop. density (per km²): 280.9

Jasin is a federal constituency in Jasin District, Malacca, Malaysia, that has been represented in the Dewan Rakyat since 1974.

The federal constituency was created in the 1974 redistribution and is mandated to return a single member to the Dewan Rakyat under the first past the post voting system.

== Demographics ==
Ethnic breakdown of Jasin's electorate as of 2022
1. Malay (74.3%)
2. Chinese (15.4%)
3. Indian (10.0%)
4. Other ethnicities (0.30%)

As of 2020, Jasin has a population of 134,531 people.

Age breakdown of Jasin's electorate as of 2022
1. 18-20 (6.41%)
2. 21-29 (22.1%)
3. 30-39 (21.5%)
4. 40-49 (17.0%)
5. 50-59 (14.7%)
6. 60-69 (10.8%)
7. 70-79 (5.30%)
8. 80-89 (1.98%)
9. above 90 (0.31%)
Gender breakdown of Jasin's electorate as of 2022
1. Male (48.8%)
2. Female (51.2%)

== History ==
=== Polling districts ===
According to the gazette issued on 5 November 2026, the Jasin constituency has a total of 38 polling districts.

State constituency	Polling districts	Code	Location
Bemban（N24）	Pondok Kempas	139/24/01	SJK (C) Pay Yap
Bemban（N24）	Ayer Kangkong	139/24/02	SRA (JAIM) FELDA Tun Ghaffar Ayer Kangkong
Bemban（N24）	Kesang Tua	139/24/03	SK Kesang Tua
Bemban（N24）	Kesang Jaya	139/24/04	SRA (JAIM) Kesang Tua
Bemban（N24）	Ayer Barok	139/24/05	SK Air Baruk
Bemban（N24）	Taman Maju	139/24/06	SMA Tun Perak; SMK Tan Sri Haji Abdul Aziz Tapa
Bemban（N24）	Ayer Panas	139/24/07	SMK Seri Bemban
Bemban（N24）	Seri Bemban	139/24/08	SK Seri Bemban; SJK (C) Pay Chiao
Bemban（N24）	Tehel	139/24/09	SK Tehel
Rim (N25)	Kemendor	139/25/01	SK Kemendor
Rim (N25)	Seri Kesang	139/25/02	Balai Raya Seri Kesang
Rim (N25)	Kelubi	139/25/03	SK Sri Lanang
Rim (N25)	Kg Rim	139/25/04	SMK Iskandar Shah
Rim (N25)	Bukit Katong	139/25/05	SJK (C) Pay Chuin
Rim (N25)	Ladang Diamond	139/25/06	SJK (T) Ladang Diamond Jubile
Rim (N25)	Simpang Bekoh	139/25/07	SMK Simpang Bekoh
Rim (N25)	Chohong	139/25/08	SK Chohong
Rim (N25)	Chinchin	139/25/09	SK Chinchin
Rim (N25)	Simpang Kerayong	139/25/10	MRSM Tun Ghafar Baba
Serkam (N26)	Bukit Tembakau	139/26/01	SK Bukit Tembakau
Serkam (N26)	Umbai	139/26/02	SK Datuk Haji Baginda
Serkam (N26)	Anjung Batu	139/26/03	SJK (C) Kuang Hwa
Serkam (N26)	Serkam Darat	139/26/04	SM Arab Assaiyidah Khadijah
Serkam (N26)	Pulai	139/26/05	SK Pulai
Serkam (N26)	Serkam Pantai	139/26/06	SK Serkam
Serkam (N26)	Tedong	139/26/07	SK Tedong
Merlimau (N27)	Ayer Merbau	139/27/01	SJK (C) Jasin Lalang
Merlimau (N27)	Jasin Lalang	133/27/02	SK Ayer Merbau
Merlimau (N27)	Merlimau Utara	139/27/03	SK Merlimau 2
Merlimau (N27)	Merlimau Pasir	139/27/04	SK Merlimau 1
Merlimau (N27)	Sempang	139/27/05	SK Sempang
Merlimau (N27)	Pengkalan Samak	139/27/06	SJK (C) Merlimau
Merlimau (N27)	Permatang Serai	139/27/07	SK Merlimau
Sungai Rambai (N28)	Seri Mendapat	139/28/01	SK Seri Mendapat
Sungai Rambai (N28)	Batu Gajah	139/28/02	SK Batu Gajah
Sungai Rambai (N28)	Sebatu	139/28/03	SK Sebatu
Sungai Rambai (N28)	Parit Putat	139/28/04	SMK Sungai Rambai
Sungai Rambai (N28)	Parit Perawas	139/28/05	SK Parit Penghulu

=== Representation history ===
Members of Parliament for Jasin
Parliament	No	Years	Member	Party
Constituency created from Malacca Selatan
4th	P096	1974–1978	Ahmad Ithnin (احمد اثنين)	BN (UMNO)
5th	P096	1978–1982	Abdul Ghafar Baba (عبدالغفار باب)	BN (UMNO)
6th	P096	1982–1986	Abdul Ghafar Baba (عبدالغفار باب)	BN (UMNO)
7th	P114	1986–1990	Abdul Ghafar Baba (عبدالغفار باب)	BN (UMNO)
8th	P114	1990–1995	Abdul Ghafar Baba (عبدالغفار باب)	BN (UMNO)
9th	P124	1995–1999	Abdul Ghafar Baba (عبدالغفار باب)	BN (UMNO)
10th	P124	1999–2004	Abu Zahar Ithnin (ابو زاهر اثنين)	BN (UMNO)
11th	P139	2004–2008	Mohammad Said Yusof (محمد سعيد يوسف)	BN (UMNO)
12th	P139	2008–2013	Ahmad Hamzah (أحمد حمزة)	BN (UMNO)
13th	P139	2013–2018	Ahmad Hamzah (أحمد حمزة)	BN (UMNO)
14th	P139	2018–2022	Ahmad Hamzah (أحمد حمزة)	BN (UMNO)
15th	P139	2022–present	Zulkifli Ismail (ذوالكفل اسماعيل)	PN (PAS)

=== State constituency ===
Parliamentary constituency	State constituency						
Parliamentary constituency	1955–59*	1959–1974	1974–1986	1986–1995	1995–2004	2004–2018	2018–present
Jasin			Ayer Panas				
Jasin			Batang Melaka				
Jasin						Bemban	
Jasin					Merlimau		
Jasin			Nyalas				
Jasin				Rim			
Jasin			Serkam				
Jasin				Sungai Rambai			
Jasin			Sungei Rambai				

=== Current state assembly members ===
No.	State Constituency	Member	Coalition (Party)
N24	Bemban	Mohd Yadzil Yaakub	PN (WAWASAN)
N25	Rim	Khaidiriah Abu Zahar	BN (UMNO)
N26	Serkam	Azman Abdullah	BN (UMNO)
N27	Merlimau	Muhamad Akmal Saleh	BN (UMNO)
N28	Sungai Rambai	Jezlee Pit	BN (UMNO)

=== Local governments & postcodes ===
No.	State Constituency	Local Government	Postcode
N24	Bemban	Jasin Municipal Council; Hang Tuah Jaya Municipal Council (Kesang Jaya, Seri Bemban & Tehel area)	75460 Melaka; 77000 Jasin; 77100 Asahan; 77200 Bemban; 77300 Merlimau; 77400 Sungai Rambai; 77500 Selandar
N25	Rim	Jasin Municipal Council	75460 Melaka; 77000 Jasin; 77100 Asahan; 77200 Bemban; 77300 Merlimau; 77400 Sungai Rambai; 77500 Selandar
N26	Serkam	Jasin Municipal Council	75460 Melaka; 77000 Jasin; 77100 Asahan; 77200 Bemban; 77300 Merlimau; 77400 Sungai Rambai; 77500 Selandar
N27	Merlimau	Jasin Municipal Council	75460 Melaka; 77000 Jasin; 77100 Asahan; 77200 Bemban; 77300 Merlimau; 77400 Sungai Rambai; 77500 Selandar
N28	Sungai Rambai	Jasin Municipal Council	75460 Melaka; 77000 Jasin; 77100 Asahan; 77200 Bemban; 77300 Merlimau; 77400 Sungai Rambai; 77500 Selandar

== Election results ==
Malaysian general election, 2022
Party	Candidate	Votes	%	∆%
PN	Zulkifli Ismail	27,893	35.95	▲35.95
BN	Roslan Ahmad	27,571	35.53	▼7.47
PH	Harun Mohamed	21,674	27.93	▼14.72
GTA	Mohd Daud Nasir	460	0.59	▲0.59
Total valid votes		77,598	100.00	
Total rejected ballots		553		
Unreturned ballots		178		
Turnout		78,329	81.42	▲4.25
Registered electors		96,208		
Majority		322	0.42	▲0.07
PN gain from BN		Swing		?
Source(s) https://lom.agc.gov.my/ilims/upload/portal/akta/outputp/1753258/PUB%20616%20PARLIMEN%20MELAKA.pdf

Malaysian general election, 2018
Party	Candidate	Votes	%	∆%
BN	Ahmad Hamzah	26,560	43.00	▼17.56
PH	Khairuddin Abu Hassan	26,341	42.65	▲42.65
PAS	Abd Alim Shapie	8,860	14.35	▲14.35
Total valid votes		61,761	100.00	
Total rejected ballots		912		
Unreturned ballots		239		
Turnout		62,912	85.67	▼2.54
Registered electors		73,432		
Majority		219	0.35	▼20.77
BN hold		Swing		
Source(s) "His Majesty's Government Gazette - Notice of Contested Election, Parliament for the State of Malacca [P.U. (B) 243/2018]" (PDF). Attorney General's Chambers of Malaysia. 3 May 2018. "Federal Government Gazette - Results of Contested Election and Statements of the Poll after the Official Addition of Votes, Parliamentary Constituencies for the State of Malacca [P.U. (B) 317/2018]" (PDF). Attorney General's Chambers of Malaysia. 28 May 2018. Archived from the original (PDF) on 2019-12-29.

Malaysian general election, 2013
Party	Candidate	Votes	%	∆%
BN	Ahmad Hamzah	33,736	60.56	▼4.08
PKR	Rahmat Yusof	21,973	39.44	▲4.08
Total valid votes		55,709	100.00	
Total rejected ballots		1,001		
Unreturned ballots		146		
Turnout		56,856	88.21	▲8.64
Registered electors		64,455		
Majority		11,763	21.12	▼8.16
BN hold		Swing		
Source(s) "Federal Government Gazette - Notice of Contested Election, Parliament for the State of Malacca [P.U. (B) 180/2013]" (PDF). Attorney General's Chambers of Malaysia. 26 April 2013. "Federal Government Gazette - Results of Contested Election and Statements of the Poll after the Official Addition of Votes, Parliamentary Constituencies for the State of Malacca [P.U. (B) 221/2013]" (PDF). Attorney General's Chambers of Malaysia. 22 May 2013.

Malaysian general election, 2008
Party	Candidate	Votes	%	∆%
BN	Ahmad Hamzah	28,101	64.64	▼11.34
PKR	Zulkefly Othman	15,373	35.36	▲35.36
Total valid votes		43,474	100.00	
Total rejected ballots		1,094		
Unreturned ballots		86		
Turnout		44,654	79.57	▼0.11
Registered electors		56,121		
Majority		12,728	29.28	▼22.68
BN hold		Swing		

Malaysian general election, 2004
Party	Candidate	Votes	%	∆%
BN	Mohammad Said Yusof	31,198	75.98	▲11.37
PAS	Jasme Tompang	9,864	24.02	▼11.37
Total valid votes		41,062	100.00	
Total rejected ballots		1,249		
Unreturned ballots		95		
Turnout		42,406	79.68	▲1.90
Registered electors		53,218		
Majority		21,334	51.96	▲22.74
BN hold		Swing		

Malaysian general election, 1999
Party	Candidate	Votes	%	∆%
BN	Abu Zahar Ithnin	23,638	64.61	▼13.58
PAS	Mujahid Yusof	12,947	35.39	▲20.61
Total valid votes		36,585	100.00	
Total rejected ballots		810		
Unreturned ballots		72		
Turnout		37,467	77.78	▲1.98
Registered electors				
Majority		10,691	29.22	▼34.19
BN hold		Swing		

Malaysian general election, 1995
Party	Candidate	Votes	%	∆%
BN	Abdul Ghafar Baba	25,693	78.19	▲5.73
PAS	Ahmad Dali Abu Hassan	4,856	14.78	▲14.78
S46	Tawab Katab	2,310	7.03	▼20.51
Total valid votes		32,859	100.00	
Total rejected ballots		1,253		
Unreturned ballots		69		
Turnout		34,181	75.80	▼2.13
Registered electors				
Majority		20,837	63.41	▲18.49
BN hold		Swing		

Malaysian general election, 1990
Party	Candidate	Votes	%	∆%
BN	Abdul Ghafar Baba	22,826	72.46	▼3.89
S46	Aris Konil	8,674	27.54	▲27.54
Total valid votes		31,500	100.00	
Total rejected ballots		1,019		
Unreturned ballots		0		
Turnout		32,519	77.93	▲6.72
Registered electors		41,729		
Majority		14,152	44.92	▼7.78
BN hold		Swing		

Malaysian general election, 1986
Party	Candidate	Votes	%	∆%
BN	Abdul Ghafar Baba	20,772	76.35	▲4.72
PAS	Rahimin Bani	6,436	23.65	▲4.72
Total valid votes		27,208	100.00	
Total rejected ballots		992		
Unreturned ballots		0		
Turnout		28,200	71.21	▼5.33
Registered electors		39,600		
Majority		14,336	52.70	▼9.44
BN hold		Swing		

Malaysian general election, 1982
Party	Candidate	Votes	%	∆%
BN	Abdul Ghafar Baba	27,542	81.07	▲20.67
PAS	Salleh Ayob	6,432	18.93	▲0.55
Total valid votes		33,974	100.00	
Total rejected ballots		1,683		
Unreturned ballots		0		
Turnout		35,657	76.54	▼2.46
Registered electors		46,588		
Majority		21,110	62.14	
BN hold		Swing		

Malaysian general election, 1978
Party	Candidate	Votes	%	∆%
BN	Abdul Ghafar Baba	18,599	60.40	▼13.66
DAP	Abdul Karim Abu	6,532	21.21	▲21.21
PAS	Jaliluddin Abd Wahid	5,660	18.38	▲18.93
Total valid votes		30,791	100.00	
Total rejected ballots		881		
Unreturned ballots		0		
Turnout		31,672	79.00	▲1.22
Registered electors		40,092		
Majority		12,067	39.19	▼8.93
BN hold		Swing		

Malaysian general election, 1974
Party	Candidate	Votes	%
BN	Ahmad Ithnin	18,621	74.06
PEKEMAS	Abdul Karim Abu	6,521	25.94
Total valid votes		25,142	100.00
Total rejected ballots		1,269	
Unreturned ballots		0	
Turnout		26,266	77.88
Registered electors		33,591	
Majority		12,100	48.12
This was a new constituency created.
