= Malacca Luar (Federal Legislative Council constituency) =

Former constituency in Malaysia

Malacca constituency

Defunct federal constituency
- Legislature: Dewan Rakyat
- Constituency created: 1955
- Constituency abolished: 1959
- First contested: 1955
- Last contested: 1955

Malacca Luar was a federal constituency in Malacca, Malaysia, that has been represented in the Federal Legislative Council from 1955 to 1959.

The federal constituency was created in the 1955 redistribution and is mandated to return a single member to the Federal Legislative Council under the first past the post voting system.

== History ==
It was abolished in 1959 when it was redistributed.

=== Representation history ===
Members of Parliament for Malacca Luar
Parliament	Years	Member	Party	vote Share
Constituency created
1st	1955-1959	Abdul Ghafar Baba (عبدالغفار باب)	Alliance (UMNO)	26,790; 90.47%
Constituency abolished, split into Malacca Utara and Malacca Selatan

=== State constituency ===
Parliamentary constituency	State constituency						
Parliamentary constituency	1955–59*	1959–1974	1974–1986	1986–1995	1995–2004	2004–2018	2018–present
Malacca Luar	Alor Gajah East						
Malacca Luar	Alor Gajah West						
Malacca Luar	Jasin North						
Malacca Luar	Jasin South						

== Election results ==
Malayan general election, 1955: Malacca Luar
Party	Candidate	Votes	%
Alliance	Abdul Ghafar Baba	26,790	90.47
NEGARA	Ja'afar Tan	2,821	9.53
Total valid votes		29,611	100.00
Total rejected ballots			
Unreturned ballots			
Turnout		29,611	88.17
Registered electors		33,584	
Majority		6,438	80.94
This was a new constituency created.
Source(s): The Straits Times.
