= Zulkifli Ismail =

Malaysian politician

Yang Berhormat Tuan Zulkifli Ismail MP
- ذوالكفل إسماعيل
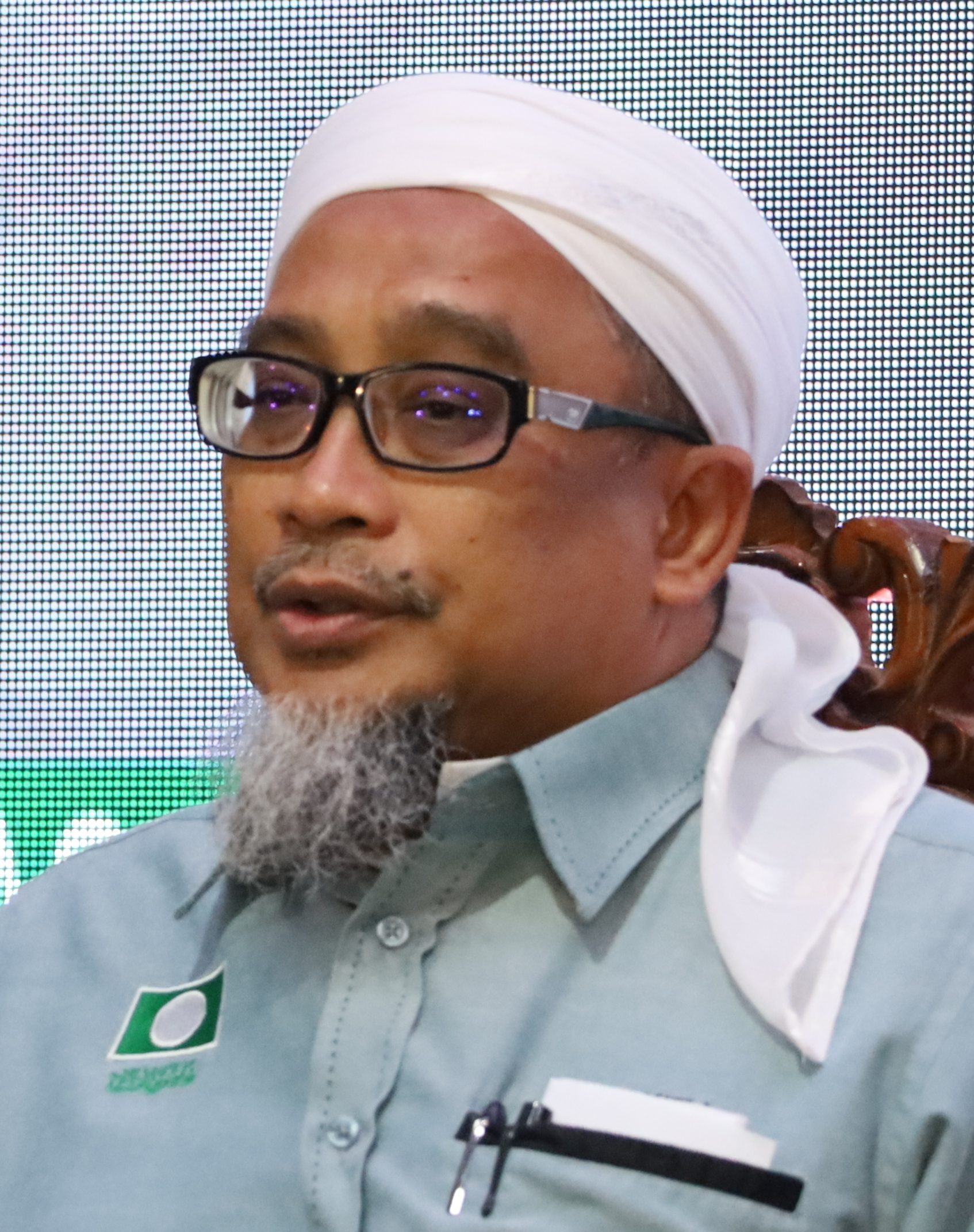
- Zulkifli Ismail in 2024

Member of the Malaysian Parliament for Jasin
- Incumbent
- Assumed office 19 November 2022
- Preceded by: Ahmad Hamzah (BN–UMNO)
- Majority: 322 (2022)

Personal details
- Born: 1 January 1966 (age 60) Kampung Paya Rumput Jaya, Sungai Udang, Malacca
- Party: Malaysian Islamic Party (PAS)
- Other political affiliations: Perikatan Nasional (PN)

Zulkifli bin Ismail (born 1 January 1966) is a Malaysian politician who has served as the Member of Parliament (MP) for Jasin since November 2022. He is a member of the Malaysian Islamic Party (PAS), a component party of the Perikatan Nasional (PN) coalition.

== Election results ==
Parliament of Malaysia
Year	Constituency	Candidate	Votes	Pct	Opponent(s)	Votes	Pct	Ballots cast	Majority	Turnout
2018	P136 Tangga Batu	Zulkifli Ismail (PAS)	8,961	12.96%	Rusnah Aluai (PKR)	32,420	46.89%	70,453	4,659	84.67%
2018	P136 Tangga Batu	Zulkifli Ismail (PAS)	8,961	12.96%	Zali Mat Yasin (UMNO)	27,761	40.15%	70,453	4,659	84.67%
2022	P139 Jasin	Zulkifli Ismail (PAS)	27,893	35.95%	Roslan Ahmad (UMNO)	27,571	35.53%	78,329	322	81.42%
2022	P139 Jasin	Zulkifli Ismail (PAS)	27,893	35.95%	Harun Mohamed (AMANAH)	21,674	27.93%	78,329	322	81.42%
2022	P139 Jasin	Zulkifli Ismail (PAS)	27,893	35.95%	Mohd Daud Nasir (PEJUANG)	460	0.59%	78,329	322	81.42%

== Honours ==
=== Honours of Malaysia ===
- Malaysia
  - Recipient of the 17th Yang di-Pertuan Agong Installation Medal (2024)
