= Ahmad Hamzah =

Malaysian politician

Yang Berbahagia Datuk Seri Ahmad Hamzah DGSM DCSM DMSM
- أحمد حمزة

Deputy Minister of Agriculture and Food Industries I
- In office 30 August 2021 – 24 November 2022 Serving with Nik Muhammad Zawawi Salleh (Deputy Minister of Agriculture and Food Industries II)
- Monarch: Abdullah
- Prime Minister: Ismail Sabri Yaakob
- Minister: Ronald Kiandee
- Preceded by: Himself
- Succeeded by: Chan Foong Hin (Deputy Minister of Agriculture and Food Security)
- Constituency: Jasin
- In office 10 March 2020 – 16 August 2021 Serving with Che Abdullah Mat Nawi (Deputy Minister of Agriculture and Food Industries II)
- Monarch: Abdullah
- Prime Minister: Muhyiddin Yassin
- Minister: Ronald Kiandee
- Preceded by: Sim Tze Tzin (Deputy Minister of Agriculture and Agro-based Industry)
- Succeeded by: Himself
- Constituency: Jasin

Member of the Malaysian Parliament for Jasin
- In office 8 March 2008 – 19 November 2022
- Preceded by: Mohammad Said Yusof (BN–UMNO)
- Succeeded by: Zulkifli Ismail (PN–PAS)
- Majority: 12,728 (2008); 11,763 (2013); 219 (2018)

Member of the Melaka State Legislative Assembly for Serkam
- In office 24 April 1995 – 8 March 2008
- Preceded by: Arifin Baba (BN–UMNO)
- Succeeded by: Ghazale Muhamad (BN–UMNO)
- Majority: 4,117 (1995); 1,889 (1999); 4,347 (2004)

Exco roles (Malacca)
- 1995–1999: Chairman of the Agriculture and Rural Development
- 1999–2004: Chairman of the Industry, Science and Technology
- 2004–2008: Chairman of the Health, Consumer Affair and Human Resources

Faction represented in Dewan Rakyat
- 2008–2022: Barisan Nasional

Faction represented in Malacca State Legislative Assembly
- 1995–2008: Barisan Nasional

Personal details
- Born: Ahmad bin Hamzah; 27 September 1948 (age 77) Malacca, Federation of Malaya (now Malaysia)
- Party: United Malays National Organisation (UMNO)
- Other political affiliations: Barisan Nasional (BN)
- Spouse: Zainun Abdul Ghafar
- Relations: Abdul Ghafar Baba (father-in-law)
- Education: University of London
- Occupation: Politician
- Website: p139jasin.blogspot.com

Ahmad bin Hamzah (Jawi: أحمد بن حمزة; born 27 September 1948) is a Malaysian politician who served as Deputy Minister of Agriculture and Food Industries I for the second term in the Barisan Nasional (BN) administration under former Prime Minister Dato' Seri Ismail Sabri Yaakob and former Minister Ronald Kiandee from August 2021 to the collapse of the BN administration in November 2022 and the first term in the Perikatan Nasional (PN) administration under former Prime Minister Tan Sri Muhyiddin Yassin and former Minister Ronald from March 2020 to the collapse of the PN administration in August 2021, Member of Parliament (MP) for Jasin from March 2008 to November 2022 and Member of the Melaka State Legislative Assembly (MLA) for Serkam from April 1995 to March 2008. He is a member of the United Malay National Organisation (UMNO), a component party of the BN coalition and the son-in-law of Tun Abdul Ghafar Baba, the former Deputy Prime Minister.

Ahmad was elected to federal Parliament in the 2008 election, having been nominated by UMNO to contest the Jasin seat ahead of its incumbent member Mohammad Said bin Yusof. Before entering the federal parliament, Ahmad was previously a three terms member of the Malacca State Legislative Assembly for the seat of Serkam .

Ahmad retained the Jasin seat in the 2013 and 2018 general elections consecutively.

== Election results ==
Malacca State Legislative Assembly
| Year | Constituency | Candidate | Votes | Pct | Opponent(s) | Votes | Pct | Ballots cast | Majority | Turnout |
|---|---|---|---|---|---|---|---|---|---|---|
| 1995 | N24 Serkam | Ahmad Hamzah (UMNO) | 6,594 | 72.69% | Md Said Omar (PAS) | 2,477 | 27.31% | 9,246 | 4,117 | 79.46% |
| 1999 | N24 Serkam | Ahmad Hamzah (UMNO) | 5,902 | 59.53% | Halim Ramli (PAS) | 4,013 | 40.47% | 10,187 | 1,889 | 80.78% |
| 2004 | N26 Serkam | Ahmad Hamzah (UMNO) | 7,344 | 71.02% | Kamarudin Sedik (PAS) | 2,997 | 28.98% | 10,523 | 4,347 | 83.52% |

Parliament of Malaysia
| Year | Constituency | Candidate | Votes | Pct | Opponent(s) | Votes | Pct | Ballots cast | Majority | Turnout |
|---|---|---|---|---|---|---|---|---|---|---|
| 2008 | P139 Jasin | Ahmad Hamzah (UMNO) | 28,101 | 64.64% | Zulkefly Othman (PKR) | 15,373 | 35.36% | 44,654 | 12,728 | 79.57% |
| 2013 | P139 Jasin | Ahmad Hamzah (UMNO) | 33,736 | 60.56% | Rahmat Yusof (PKR) | 21,973 | 39.44% | 56,856 | 11,763 | 88.21% |
| 2018 | P139 Jasin | Ahmad Hamzah (UMNO) | 26,560 | 43.00% | Khairuddin Abu Hassan (AMANAH) | 26,341 | 42.65% | 62,912 | 219 | 85.67% |
| 2018 | P139 Jasin | Ahmad Hamzah (UMNO) | 26,560 | 43.00% | Abdul Alim Shapie (PAS) | 8,860 | 14.35% | 62,912 | 219 | 85.67% |

== Honours ==
- Malacca
  - Grand Commander of the Exalted Order of Malacca (DGSM) – Datuk Seri (2016)
  - Knight Commander of the Exalted Order of Malacca (DCSM) – Datuk Wira (2004)
  - Companion Class I of the Exalted Order of Malacca (DMSM) – Datuk (1996)

== See also ==
- Jasin (federal constituency)
