= Muhamad Akmal Saleh =

Malaysian politician and doctor

Yang Berhormat Datuk Dr. Muhamad Akmal Saleh DMSM MLA
- محمد أكمل صالح
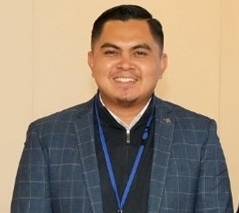
- Muhamad Akmal in 2024

Member of the Malacca State Executive Council
- In office 5 April 2023 – 14 November 2026
- Governor: Mohd Ali Rustam
- Deputy: Low Chee Leong
- Chief Minister: Ab Rauf Yusoh
- Portfolio: Rural Development, Agriculture and Food Security
- Preceded by: Abdul Razak Abdul Rahman (Rural Development and Agriculture); Portfolio established (Food Security)
- Constituency: Merlimau
- In office 26 November 2021 – 31 March 2023
- Governor: Mohd Ali Rustam
- Chief Minister: Sulaiman Md Ali
- Portfolio: Health and Anti-drugs
- Preceded by: Rahmad Mariman
- Succeeded by: Ngwe Hee Sem (Health); Portfolio abolished (Anti-drugs)
- Constituency: Merlimau

15th Youth Chief of the United Malays National Organisation
- Incumbent
- Assumed office 12 March 2023
- President: Ahmad Zahid Hamidi
- Deputy: Mohd Hairi Mad Shah
- Preceded by: Asyraf Wajdi Dusuki

Member of the Malacca State Legislative Assembly for Merlimau
- Incumbent
- Assumed office 20 November 2021
- Preceded by: Roslan Ahmad (BN–UMNO)
- Majority: 3,248 (2021); 8,724 (2026)

Personal details
- Born: Muhamad Akmal bin Saleh; 2 July 1988 (age 38) Merlimau, Jasin, Melaka, Malaysia
- Citizenship: Malaysia
- Party: United Malays National Organisation (UMNO)
- Other political affiliations: Barisan Nasional (BN)
- Spouse: Nadhirah Idrus
- Relations: Muhammad Solehin Saleh (elder brother)
- Children: 2
- Education: Sekolah Kebangsaan Merlimau II; Sekolah Menengah Kebangsaan Dato' Abdul Rahman Yaakob; Sekolah Tuanku Abdul Rahman; Malacca Matriculation College
- Alma mater: Russian National Research Medical University (MBBS)
- Occupation: Politician
- Profession: Medical doctor
- Muhamad Akmal Saleh on Facebook

Muhamad Akmal bin Saleh (Jawi: محمد أكمل صالح, Malay pronunciation: [muhamad akmal]; born 2 July 1988) is a Malaysian politician and doctor who has served as Member of the Malacca State Legislative Assembly (MLA) for Merlimau since November 2021. He served as Member of the Malacca State Executive Council (EXCO) in the Barisan Nasional (BN) state administration under Chief Minister Ab Rauf Yusoh since April 2023 for the second term and under former Chief Minister Sulaiman Md Ali from November 2021 to March 2023 for the first term. He is a member of the United Malays National Organisation (UMNO), a component party of the BN coalition. He has served as the 15th Youth Chief of UMNO and Division Chief of UMNO Jasin since March 2023.

== Early life and education ==
Muhamad Akmal bin Saleh was born in Merlimau, Malacca, Malaysia. He received his early education at SMK Dato' Abdul Rahman Ya'akob, Merlimau, Malacca and Sekolah Tuanku Abdul Rahman, Ipoh, Perak. Then, he got higher education at Melaka Matriculation College for a year before continuing his studies at Russian State Medical University in the field of medicine.

== Political career ==
Muhamad Akmal served as the Head of the UMNO Overseas Club (Russia) from 2010 to 2012. He was also appointed as the Head of the Medical Team of the UMNO Welfare Bureau in 2017. In 2018, he was appointed as the UMNO Youth Branch Chief of Merlimau Tengah (2018-2021) and UMNO Youth Division Chief for Jasin (2018–2021).

In 2018, after Barisan Nasional's defeat in 13th General Election, he won unopposed for the position of UMNO Youth Division Chief for Jasin. He was nominated as a Barisan Nasional candidate for the N28 Merlimau seat in the 2021 Malacca state election. He won with a majority of 3248, the highest majority for the entire state of Melaka.

Muhamad Akmal was elected to the Melaka State Legislative Assembly in the 2021 Malacca state election on 20 November 2021, winning the seat of Merlimau from Roslan Ahmad also of the BN coalition. In addition, he was also appointed as Member of the Melaka State EXCO in charge of Health and Anti-drugs by 12th Chief Minister Sulaiman on 26 November 2021. He was reappointed as a Member of the Melaka State EXCO in charge of Rural Development, Agriculture and Food Security by 13th Chief Minister Ab Rauf on 5 April 2023.

=== Resignation as Melaka EXCO Member ===
On 15 January 2026, Akmal announced his resignation as a Melaka EXCO Member effective next week, 19 January 2026, while remaining in his position as the UMNO Youth Chief during the UMNO Youth Assembly, Akmal said his resignation was meant to reflect and defend the voices of UMNO’s grassroots, stating that he could not continue sitting alongside the Democratic Action Party (DAP) and that he intended to “fight DAP to the end.” However, he reaffirmed his acceptance of UMNO’s decision to remain in the federal unity government until the end of its term. He said he had discussed his decision with Ab Rauf and UMNO President Ahmad Zahid Hamidi, who advised him that fighters should not abandon their comrades. Despite this, he felt compelled to step aside from the EXCO Member role to better represent grassroots concerns. His announcement prompted delegates to urge him to withdraw his resignation. The move followed calls by DAP Youth for him to step down over his criticism of the unity government, and earlier indications by Akmal that he might resign amid internal party backlash. He also shared that Ab Rauf had been his mentor since his student leadership days and had played a key role in shaping his political journey.

== Controversies and issues ==
=== Allah word on socks at KK Super Mart ===
Muhamad Akmal has called on all Muslims and Malays in Malaysia to boycott KK Super Mart for insulting the word of God. He also reminded KK Mart or any party that the power to buy is in our hands (Malay peoples) and never play with the sentiment and sensitivity of the "3R" (religion, race and royalty). Muhamad Akmal also added in his statement to urge KK Super Mart to put up banners in all its 881 branches in Malaysia to apologize to Muslims regarding this statement. His statement was supported by Chief Minister of Melaka, Datuk Seri Ab Rauf Yusoh. Akmal later joined criticism of KK due to a viral photo of a ham and cheese sandwich being labelled as halal, although it later emerged that the meat was chicken.

=== Found guilty against elder brother for libel ===
In December 2023, the Melaka sessions court ordered state executive councilor Dr Akmal Saleh to pay RM45,000 in damages to his elder brother after finding him liable for defamation. Dr Solehin Saleh filed the suit against Akmal in September 2023. In the claim, Solehin said his brother had, in a Facebook post on 26 August 2022, libeled him by describing him as an individual in debt and claiming he had maliciously posted negative comments about Akmal using a fake account. Solehin claimed the comments implied that he was a cheat, immoral, lacking in integrity, and an irresponsible elder brother.

=== Found guilty against Seputeh MP Teresa Kok for defamation ===
In October 2026, Dr Akmal Saleh was found guilty for defamation against Seputeh MP Teresa Kok for remarks he made pertaining to disputes on halal certification. The High Court in Melaka also order Dr Akmal to pay RM50,000 in legal costs to Teresa in addition to the RM250,000 suit.

== Election results ==
Malacca State Legislative Assembly
Year	Constituency	Candidate	Votes	Pct	Opponent(s)	Votes	Pct	Ballots cast	Majority	Turnout
2021	N27 Merlimau	Muhamad Akmal Saleh (UMNO)	5,633	58.43%	Azrin Abdul Majid (AMANAH)	2,385	24.74%	9,640	3,248	68.79%
2021	N27 Merlimau	Muhamad Akmal Saleh (UMNO)	5,633	58.43%	Abdul Alim Shapie (PAS)	1,622	16.83%	9,640	3,248	68.79%
2026	N27 Merlimau	Muhamad Akmal Saleh (UMNO)	11,703	79.71%	Rahayu Hamzah (AMANAH)	2,979	20.29%	14,682	8,724	74.90%

== Honours ==
- Malacca
  - Companion of the Exalted Order of Malacca (DMSM) – Datuk (2024)
