= Chong Hon Nyan =

Malaysian politician (1924–2020)

Yang Berbahagia Tan Sri Datuk Seri Chong Hon Nyan PSM DGSM JMN KMN AMN

Member of the Malaysian Parliament for Batu Berendam
- In office 1974–1986
- Preceded by: Tan Siew Sin (Malacca Tengah MP)
- Succeeded by: Mohd. Tamrin Abdul Ghafar (BN-UMNO)
- Majority: 10,071 (1974) won uncontested (1978); 21,605 (1982)

Minister of Transport
- In office 2 June 1983 – 6 January 1986
- Prime Minister: Mahathir Mohamad
- Preceded by: Lee San Choon
- Succeeded by: Ling Liong Sik

Minister of Health
- In office 1978–1982
- Preceded by: Lee Siok Yew
- Succeeded by: Mak Hon Kam

Personal details
- Born: 21 June 1924 Kuala Lumpur, Selangor, Federated Malay States
- Died: 15 March 2020 (aged 95)
- Party: Malaysian Chinese Association (MCA)
- Other political affiliations: Barisan Nasional (BN)

Chong Hon Nyan (张汉源; 21 June 1924 – 15 March 2020) was a Malaysian politician. He served as Minister of Health and Minister of Transport.

== Personal life ==
Chong was a Chinese with Baba-Nyonya descendant. He died on 15 March 2020, at the age of 95.

== Election results ==
Parliament of Malaysia
Year	Constituency	Candidate	Votes	Pct	Opponent(s)	Votes	Pct	Ballots cast	Majority	Turnout
1974	P097 Batu Berendam	Chong Hon Nyan (MCA)	18,182	64.47%	Hasnul Abdul Hadi (PRM)	8,111	28.76%	2,9637	10,071	78.17%
1974	P097 Batu Berendam	Chong Hon Nyan (MCA)	18,182	64.47%	Maidin Manaf (IND)	1,910	6.77%	2,9637	10,071	78.17%
1978	P097 Batu Berendam	Chong Hon Nyan (MCA)	Unopposed							
1982	P097 Batu Berendam	Chong Hon Nyan (MCA)	30,938	76.82%	Jaliluddin Abdul Wahid (PAS)	9,333	23.18%	41,767	21,605	76.90%

== Honours ==
- Malaya
  - Member of the Order of the Defender of the Realm (AMN) (1962)
- Malaysia
  - Officer of the Order of the Defender of the Realm (KMN) (1965)
  - Recipient of the Malaysian Commemorative Medal (Silver) (PPM) (1965)
  - Companion of the Order of the Defender of the Realm (JMN) (1969)
  - Commander of the Order of Loyalty to the Crown of Malaysia (PSM) – Tan Sri (1973)
- Malacca
  - Grand Commander of the Exalted Order of Malacca (DGSM) – Datuk Seri (1983)
