= Mohammad Said Yusof =

Malaysian politician (1959–2023)

Yang Berbahagia Datuk Mohammad Said Yusof DMSM
- محمد سعيد يوسف

Member of the Malaysian Parliament for Jasin
- In office 21 March 2004 – 8 March 2008
- Preceded by: Abu Zahar Ithnin (BN–UMNO)
- Succeeded by: Ahmad Hamzah (BN–UMNO)

Personal details
- Born: Mohammad Said bin Yusof; 15 September 1959
- Died: 28 August 2023 (aged 63)
- Party: United Malays National Organisation (UMNO)
- Other political affiliations: Barisan Nasional (BN)
- Occupation: Politician

Mohammad Said bin Yusof (15 September 1959 – 28 August 2023) was a Malaysian politician who served as the Member of Parliament (MP) for Jasin from March 2004 to March 2008. He is a member of the United Malays National Organisation (UMNO), a component party of the Barisan Nasional (BN) coalition.

After the dissolution of Parliament on 13 February 2008, Mohammad Said was dropped by BN as a candidate for the seat of Jasin in the 2008 general election, to be replaced by another UMNO-affiliated member, Ahmad Hamzah.

== Controversies ==
=== Illegal timber exports ===
In May 2006, a scandal arose over an MP who allegedly asked the Malaccan Customs and Excise Department for special treatment in the handling of an illegal timber import shipment from Indonesia. After the New Straits Times publicised the issue, Parliamentary Leader of the Opposition Lim Kit Siang from the Democratic Action Party (DAP) moved to refer the issue to the Dewan Rakyat House Rights and Privileges Committee. After the motion failed, the Chairman of the Barisan Nasional Backbenchers Club (BNBBC), Shahrir Abdul Samad, announced his resignation as a matter of principle.

Shortly after, Said announced he was the MP implicated in the scandal. However, he said he had only requested leniency in the case concerned, as the shipment had been confiscated on the basis of a technicality. Although the diameter of the logs concerned exceeded the maximum limit of 152.4 centimetres, Said requested leniency on the behalf of one of his constituents, because the logs had been partially hollowed out. The Department rejected Said's request to simply compound the shipment. Said later told the press that although he felt the decision was right, some discretion should have been exercised to aid the Bumiputra entrepreneur whose interests were affected.

On 10 May 2006, following an exposé by the New Straits Times, Said admitted that the company he was trying to help in the log scandal was in fact his own company, Binyu Sof Enterprise.

=== "Bocor" remark ===
In a 9 May 2007 Parliament session, Mohammad Said supported Kinabatangan MP Datuk Bung Mokhtar Radin, who made sexist remarks referencing menstruation against Fong Po Kuan, a female Batu Gajah MP from the Democratic Action Party. The incident occurred during a heated argument with Fong over ceiling leakages in the Parliament Houses, accumulating to both men stating the following in Malay:

Mana ada bocor? Batu Gajah pun bocor tiap-tiap bulan juga. (Where is the leak? Batu Gajah leaks every month too.)

Both Mohammad Said and Bung Mokhtar's remark led to an uproar among women's groups. The two MPs would later issue a "public apology" to women "who might have been offended" by their words during a meeting with Women, Family and Community Development Minister Shahrizat Abdul Jalil on 18 May 2007.

== Death ==
Mohd Said Yusof died on 28 August 2023 due to heart problems and diabetes.

== Election results ==
Parliament of Malaysia
Year	Constituency	Candidate	Votes	Pct	Opponent(s)	Votes	Pct	Ballots cast	Majority	Turnout
2004	P139 Jasin, Malacca	Mohammad Said Yusof (UMNO)	31,198	75.98%	Jasme Tompang (PAS)	9,864	24.02%	42,406	21,334	79.68%

== Honours ==
- Malacca
  - Companion Class I of the Exalted Order of Malacca (DMSM) – Datuk (2004)
