= Roslan Ahmad =

Malaysian politician

Yang Berbahagia Datuk Roslan Ahmad DMSM
- رسلان أحمد

Member of the Malacca State Executive Council (Public Works, Transport, Public Facilities and Infrastructure)
- In office 13 March 2020 – 21 November 2021
- Governor: Mohd Khalil Yaakob (March–June 2020); Mohd Ali Rustam (2020–2021)
- Chief Minister: Sulaiman Md Ali
- Preceded by: Mohd Sofi Abdul Wahab
- Succeeded by: Rahmad Mariman
- Constituency: Merlimau

Deputy Member of the Malacca State Executive Council (Housing, Local Government, and Environment : 1 April 2011–13 May 2013) (Woman Affairs, Family Development and Welfare Affairs : 14 May 2013–11 May 2018)
- In office 1 April 2011 – 11 May 2018
- Governor: Mohd Khalil Yaakob
- Chief Minister: Mohd Ali Rustam (2011–2013); Idris Haron (2013–2018)
- Member: Md Yunos Husin (2011–2013); Latipah Omar (2013–2018)
- Preceded by: Position established
- Succeeded by: Position abolished
- Constituency: Merlimau

Member of the Malacca State Legislative Assembly for Merlimau
- In office 6 March 2011 – 20 November 2021
- Preceded by: Mohamad Hidhir Abu Hassan (BN–UMNO)
- Succeeded by: Muhamad Akmal Saleh (BN–UMNO)
- Majority: 3,643 (2011); 2,589 (2013); 130 (2018)

Personal details
- Born: Roslan bin Ahmad Malacca, Malaysia
- Citizenship: Malaysian
- Party: United Malays National Organisation (UMNO)
- Other political affiliations: Barisan Nasional (BN)
- Occupation: Politician

Roslan bin Ahmad is a Malaysian politician who served as Member and Deputy Member of the Malacca State Executive Council (EXCO) in the Barisan Nasional (BN) state administration under former Chief Minister Sulaiman Md Ali from March 2020 to November 2021 and Mohd Ali Rustam and Idris Haron as well as former Members Md Yunos Husin and Latipah Omar from April 2011 to the collapse of the BN state administration in May 2018 respectively. He also served as Member of the Malacca State Legislative Assembly (MLA) for Merlimau from March 2011 to November 2021. He is a member of the United Malays National Organisation (UMNO), a component party of the BN coalition.

== Election results ==
Malacca State Legislative Assembly
Year	Constituency	Candidate	Votes	Pct	Opponent(s)	Votes	Pct	Ballots cast	Majority	Turnout
2011	N27 Merlimau	Roslan Ahmad (UMNO)	5,962	72.00%	Yuhaizad Abdullah (PAS)	2,319	28.00%	8,417	3,643	78.82%
2013	N27 Merlimau	Roslan Ahmad (UMNO)	6,736	61.89%	Yuhaizad Abdullah (PAS)	4,147	38.11%	11,022	2,589	87.42%
2018	N27 Merlimau	Roslan Ahmad (UMNO)	5,290	45.33%	Yuhaizad Abdullah (AMANAH)	5,160	44.30%	11,849	130	85.80%
2018	N27 Merlimau	Roslan Ahmad (UMNO)	5,290	45.33%	Abd Malek Yusof (PAS)	1,208	10.37%	11,849	130	85.80%

Parliament of Malaysia
Year	Constituency	Candidate	Votes	Pct	Opponent(s)	Votes	Pct	Ballots cast	Majority	Turnout
2022	P139 Jasin	Roslan Ahmad (UMNO)	27,571	35.53%	Zulkifli Ismail (PAS)	27,893	35.95%	78,329	322	81.42%
2022	P139 Jasin	Roslan Ahmad (UMNO)	27,571	35.53%	Harun Mohamed (AMANAH)	21,674	27.93%	78,329	322	81.42%
2022	P139 Jasin	Roslan Ahmad (UMNO)	27,571	35.53%	Mohd Daud Nasir (PEJUANG)	460	0.59%	78,329	322	81.42%

== Honours ==
- Malacca
  - Companion Class I of the Exalted Order of Malacca (DMSM) – Datuk (2014)
