= Malacca Selatan =

Malacca constituency

Defunct federal constituency
- Legislature: Dewan Rakyat
- Constituency created: 1958
- Constituency abolished: 1974
- First contested: 1959
- Last contested: 1969

Malacca Selatan was a federal constituency in Malacca, Malaysia, that was represented in the Dewan Rakyat from 1959 to 1974.

The federal constituency was created in the 1974 redistribution and was mandated to return a single member to the Dewan Rakyat under the first past the post voting system.

== History ==
It was abolished in 1974 when it was redistributed.

=== Representation history ===
Members of Parliament for Malacca Selatan
Parliament	No	Years	Member	Party	Vote Share
Constituency created from Malacca Luar
Parliament of the Federation of Malaya
1st	P088	1959-1963	Hassan Mansor (حسن منصور)	Alliance (UMNO)	11,300; 56.14%
Parliament of Malaysia					
1st	P088	1963-1964	Hassan Mansor (حسن منصور)	Alliance (UMNO)	11,300; 56.14%
2nd	P088	1964-1969	Abdul Karim Abu (عبدالكريم ابو)	Alliance (UMNO)	18,649; 72.29%
		1969-1971	Parliament was suspended		
3rd	P088	1971-1973	Ahmad Ithnin (احمد اثنين)	Alliance (UMNO)	14,766; 60.95%
3rd	P088	1973-1974	Ahmad Ithnin (احمد اثنين)	BN (UMNO)	14,766; 60.95%
Constituency abolished, split into Alor Gajah, Jasin and Batu Berendam

=== State constituency ===
Parliamentary constituency	State constituency						
Parliamentary constituency	1955–59*	1959–1974	1974–1986	1986–1995	1995–2004	2004–2018	2018–present
Malacca Selatan		Batang Malacca					
Malacca Selatan		Jasin					
Malacca Selatan		Rim					
Malacca Selatan		Serkam					
Malacca Selatan		Sungei Rambai					

=== Historical boundaries ===
State Constituency	Area
State Constituency	1959–1974
Batang Malacca	Bukit Sedanan; Kesang; Machap; Selandar; Tebong
Jasin	Bemban; Durian Tunggal; Jasin; Kampung Gangsa; Sempang Kerayong
Rim	Asahan; Chin Chin; Chohong; Nyalas; Rim
Serkam	Kampung Kilang Berapi; Kampung Pulai; Merlimau; Serkam; Umbai
Sungei Rambai	Batu Gajah; Bukit Gadong; Kampung Seri Mendapat; Pekan Pasir; Sungei Rambai

== Election results ==
Malaysian general by-election, 30 January 1971: Malacca Selatan
Party	Candidate	Votes	%	∆%
Ahmad was elected to Parliament in the Malacca Selatan by-election, 1971. Election for Malacca Selatan federal constituency and another 40 federal constituencies in Sabah and Sarawak were postponed from the scheduled date, 10 May 1969.
Alliance	Ahmad Ithnin	14,766	60.95	▼11.34
PMIP	Mohammad Taha Kalu	5,482	22.63	▲22.63
Independent	Gan Hong Hui	2,655	10.96	▲10.96
Parti Rakyat Malaysia	Omar Abdullah	1,325	5.47	▲5.47
Total valid votes		24,228	100.00	
Total rejected ballots		471		
Unreturned ballots		0		
Turnout		24,699	68.17	▼14.91
Registered electors		36,232		
Majority		9,284	38.32	▼6.26
Alliance hold		Swing		

Malaysian general election, 1964: Malacca Selatan
Party	Candidate	Votes	%	∆%
Alliance	Abdul Karim Abu	18,649	72.29	▲16.15
Socialist Front	Jaafar Mohd Tan	7,150	27.71	▼1.16
Total valid votes		25,799	100.00	
Total rejected ballots		1,139		
Unreturned ballots		0		
Turnout		26,938	83.08	▲1.73
Registered electors		32,425		
Majority		11,499	44.58	▲17.31
Alliance hold		Swing		

Malayan general election, 1959: Malacca Selatan
Party	Candidate	Votes	%
Alliance	Hassan Mansor	11,300	56.14
Socialist Front	Chung Cheng Wen	5,812	28.87
PMIP	Mohammad Taha Kalu	3,017	14.99
Total valid votes		20,129	100.00
Total rejected ballots		188	
Unreturned ballots		0	
Turnout		20,317	81.35
Registered electors		24,975	
Majority		5,488	27.27
This was a new constituency created.
