= 2011 Merlimau by-election =

- 6 March 2011

N27 Merlimau seat in the Malacca State Legislative Assembly
	BN	PAS
Candidate	Roslan Ahmad	Yuhaizad Abdullah
Party	UMNO	PAS
Alliance	BN	PAS
Popular vote	5,962	2,319
Percentage	72.00%	28.00%
MLA before election
Mohamad Hidhir Abu Hassan
BN (UMNO)
Elected MLA
Roslan Ahmad
BN (UMNO)

The Merlimau state by-election is a state by-election that was scheduled to be held on 6 March 2011 in the state of Malacca, Malaysia. The nomination of candidates was scheduled on 26 February 2011. The Merlimau seat fell vacant following the death of its state assemblyman Datuk Mohamad Hidhir Abu Hasaan of United Malays National Organisation from a heart attack at the Putra Specialist Hospital in Malacca. Previously Mohamad Hidhir won the Merlimau seat with a 2,154 vote majority, beating PAS' Jasme Tompang at the 2008 Malaysian general elections. The state assembly seat has around 10,400 voters, comprising mainly 64% Malays, 21% Chinese and 14% Indians. For the by-election PAS picked as its candidate, Yuhaizad Abdullah while Barisan Nasional picked Roslan Ahmad.

== Results ==
Malacca state by-election, 6 March 2011: Merlimau The by-election was called due to the death of incumbent, Mohamad Hidhir Abu Hassan.
Party	Candidate	Votes	%	∆%
BN	Roslan Ahmad	5,962	72.00	
PAS	Yuhaizad Abdullah	2,319	28.00	
Total valid votes		8,281	100.00	
Total rejected ballots		135		
Unreturned ballots		1		
Turnout		8,417	78.82	
Registered electors		10,679		
Majority		3,643		
BN hold		Swing		
Source(s) "Pilihan Raya Kecil N.27 Merlimau". Election Commission of Malaysia. Archived from the original on 2018-09-19.
