= Telok Mas (state constituency) =

Political subdivision in Malaysia

Telok Mas (N23)
Malacca constituency

State constituency
- Legislature: Malacca State Legislative Assembly
MLA
Abdul Razak Abdul Rahman
BN
- Constituency created: 2003
- First contested: 2004
- Last contested: 2026

Demographics
- Electors (2026): 29,751

N23 Telok Mas within Malacca, as used for the 2021 state election

Telok Mas is a state constituency in Malacca, Malaysia, that has been represented in the Malacca State Legislative Assembly.

== Demographics ==
Ethnic breakdown of Telok Mas's electorate as of 2021
1. Malay (74.0%)
2. Chinese (23.3%)
3. Indian (1.90%)
4. Other ethnicities (0.78%)

== History ==
=== Polling districts ===
According to the gazette issued on 5 November 2026, the Telok Mas constituency has a total of 6 polling districts.

State constituency	Polling districts	Code	Location
Telok Mas (N23)	Ujong Pasir Darat	138/23/01	SK Ujong Pasir
Telok Mas (N23)	Kampung Ujong Pasir	138/23/02	SRA (JAIM) Ujung Pasir
Telok Mas (N23)	Padang Temu	138/23/03	SK Padang Temu
Telok Mas (N23)	Alai	138/23/04	SK Alai; SJK (C) Kuang Yah
Telok Mas (N23)	Kg Telok Mas	138/23/05	SMK Telok Mas
Telok Mas (N23)	Pernu	138/23/06	SK Pernu; SMK Pernu

=== Representation history ===
Members of the Legislative Assembly for Telok Mas
Assembly	No	Years	Member	Party
Constituency created from Alai
11th	N23	2004 – 2008	Amid Nordin	BN (UMNO)
12th	N23	2008 – 2013	Latiff Tamby Chik	BN (UMNO)
13th	N23	2013 – 2018	Latiff Tamby Chik	BN (UMNO)
14th	N23	2018 – 2020	Noor Effandi Ahmad	PH (BERSATU)
14th	N23	2020 – 2021	Noor Effandi Ahmad	PN (BERSATU)
14th	N23	2021	Noor Effandi Ahmad	Independent
15th	N23	2021 – 2026	Abdul Razak Abdul Rahman	BN (UMNO)
16th	N23	2026 – present	Abdul Razak Abdul Rahman	BN (UMNO)

== Election results ==
Malacca state election, 2026
Party	Candidate	Votes	%	∆%
BN	Abdul Razak Abdul Rahman	16,015	73.35	▲30.34
PH	Mohamad Jaafar	4,901	22.45	▼2.20
BERSAMA	Muhammad Hazwan Mustafa	918	4.20	▲4.20
Total valid votes		21,834		
Total rejected ballots		117		
Unreturned ballots		31		
Turnout		21,982	73.89	▲4.51
Registered electors		29,751		
Majority		11,114	50.90	▲36.15
BN hold		Swing		
Source(s) https://electiondata.my/elections/mlk/SE-16/

Malacca state election, 2021
Party	Candidate	Votes	%	∆%
BN	Abdul Razak Abdul Rahman	6,052	43.01	▲5.90
PN	Mohamad Rafiq Naizamohideen	3,976	28.25	▲28.25
PH	Asyraf Minghat	3,891	27.65	▲27.65
Independent	Muhammad Ariff Adly Mohammad	153	1.09	▲1.09
Total valid votes		14,072	100.00	
Total rejected ballots		245		
Unreturned ballots		53		
Turnout		14,370	69.38	▼16.23
Registered electors		20,712		
Majority		2,076	14.75	▲7.29
BN gain from PKR		Swing		?
Source(s) https://lom.agc.gov.my/ilims/upload/portal/akta/outputp/1715764/PUB%20583.pdf

Malacca state election, 2018
Party	Candidate	Votes	%	∆%
PKR	Noor Effandi Ahmad	7,694	44.57	▲44.57
BN	Abdul Razak Abdul Rahman	6,406	37.11	▼15.18
PAS	Rosazli Md Yasin	3,164	18.33	▼29.39
Total valid votes		17,264	100.00	
Total rejected ballots		166		
Unreturned ballots		70		
Turnout		17,500	85.61	▼2.57
Registered electors		20,441		
Majority		1,288	7.46	▲2.90
PKR gain from BN		Swing		-

Malacca state election, 2013
Party	Candidate	Votes	%	∆%
BN	Latiff Tamby Chik	8,033	52.28	▼7.03
PAS	Harun Mohamed	7,332	47.72	▲7.03
Total valid votes		15,365	100.00	
Total rejected ballots		187		
Unreturned ballots		43		
Turnout		15,595	88.18	▲6.61
Registered electors		17,685		
Majority		701	4.56	▼14.07
BN hold		Swing		

Malacca state election, 2008
Party	Candidate	Votes	%	∆%
BN	Latiff Tamby Chik	7,129	59.31	▼10.90
PAS	Abd Rahman Jaafar	4,890	40.69	▲10.90
Total valid votes		12,019	100.00	
Total rejected ballots		220		
Unreturned ballots		35		
Turnout		12,274	81.57	▼0.29
Registered electors		15,047		
Majority		2,239	18.63	▼21.80
BN hold		Swing		

Malacca state election, 2004
Party	Candidate	Votes	%
BN	Amid Nordin	7,930	70.21
PAS	Halim Ramli	3,364	29.79
Total valid votes		11,294	100.00
Total rejected ballots		249	
Unreturned ballots		5	
Turnout		11,548	81.87
Registered electors		14,106	
Majority		4,566	40.43
This was a new constituency created.
