= Batu Berendam (federal constituency) =

Malacca constituency

Defunct federal constituency
- Legislature: Dewan Rakyat
- Constituency created: 1974
- Constituency abolished: 2004
- First contested: 1974
- Last contested: 1999

Batu Berendam was a federal constituency in Malacca, Malaysia, that was represented in the Dewan Rakyat from 1974 to 2004.

The federal constituency was created in the 1974 redistribution and was mandated to return a single member to the Dewan Rakyat under the first past the post voting system.

== History ==
It was abolished in 2004 when it was redistributed.

=== Representation history ===
Members of Parliament for Batu Berendam
Parliament	No	Years	Member	Party	Vote Share
Constituency created from Malacca Tengah, Malacca Utara and Malacca Selatan
4th	P097	1974-1978	Chong Hon Nyan (张汉原)	BN (MCA)	18,182; 64.47%
5th	P097	1978-1982	Chong Hon Nyan (张汉原)	BN (MCA)	Uncontested
6th	P097	1982-1986	Chong Hon Nyan (张汉原)	BN (MCA)	30,938; 76.82%
7th	P112	1986-1990	Mohd. Tamrin Abdul Ghafar (محمد. تمرين عبدالغافر)	BN (UMNO)	25,282; 56.77%
8th	P112	1990-1995	Mohd. Tamrin Abdul Ghafar (محمد. تمرين عبدالغافر)	BN (UMNO)	35,561; 60.79%
9th	P122	1995-1999	Mohd Ali Mohd Rustam (محمد علي بن محمد رستم)	BN (UMNO)	27,846; 62.19%
10th	P122	1999-2004	Abdul Ghafar Baba (عبدالغفار باب)	BN (UMNO)	37,656; 55.36%
Constituency abolished, split into Tangga Batu and Bukit Katil

=== State constituency ===
Parliamentary constituency	State constituency						
Parliamentary constituency	1955–59*	1959–1974	1974–1986	1986–1995	1995–2004	2004–2018	2018–present
Batu Berendam			Ayer Keroh		Ayer Keroh		
Batu Berendam			Ayer Molek				
Batu Berendam					Bachang		
Batu Berendam			Bukit Rambai				
Batu Berendam				Krubong			
Batu Berendam					Paya Rumput		
Batu Berendam				Sungai Udang			
Batu Berendam			Sungei Udang				
Batu Berendam					Tangga Batu		
Batu Berendam			Tanjong Minyak				

=== Historical boundaries ===
State Constituency	Area		
State Constituency	1974	1984	1994
Ayer Keroh	Batu Berendam; Bukit Beruang; Bukit Katil; Durian Tunggal; Duyong		Ayer Keroh; Batu Berendam; Bukit Beruang; Sungai Putat; Taman Tasik Utama
Ayer Molek	Alai; Bukit Lintang; Kandang; Telok Mas; Tiang Dua	Ayer Keroh; Bukit Beruang; Bukit Katil; Duyong; Bukit Lintang	Bukit Baru; Bukit Katil; Bukit Nibong; Kampung Padang Jambu; Tiang Dua
Bachang			Bachang; Bukit Piatu; Malim Jaya; Peringgit; Taman ASEAN
Bukit Rambai	Batang Tiga; Bukit Rambai; Klebang; Taman Pandan Jaya; Taman Pokok Mangga		
Krubong		Batu Berendam; Krubong; Kampung Lanjut Manis; Malim Jaya; Peringgit	
Paya Rumput			Cheng; Kampung Lanjut Manis; Klebang; Krubong; Paya Rumput
Sungai Udang	Bukit Terendak; Pantai Puteri; Sungai Udang; Tangga Batu; Tanjung Kling	Bukit Rambai; Bukit Terendak; Sungai Udang; Tangga Batu; Tanjung Kling	
Tangga Batu			Bukit Rambai; Pantai Puteri; Tangga Batu; Tanjung Kling; Tanjung Minyak
Tanjong Minyak	Bertam; Cheng; Krubong; Paya Rumput; Rembia	Bertam; Cheng; Klebang; Paya Rumput; Rembia	

== Election results ==
Malaysian general election, 1999
Party	Candidate	Votes	%	∆%
BN	Abdul Ghafar Baba	37,656	55.36	▼6.83
PKR	Khalid Jaafar	30,368	44.64	▲44.64
Total valid votes		68,024	100.00	
Total rejected ballots		1,464		
Unreturned ballots		104		
Turnout		69,592	78.82	▲0.52
Registered electors		88,286		
Majority		7,288	10.72	▼25.72
BN hold		Swing		

Malaysian general election, 1995
Party	Candidate	Votes	%	∆%
BN	Mohd Ali Mohd Rustam	37,846	62.19	▲1.40
DAP	Tan Seng Seng	15,671	25.75	▲25.75
PAS	Mohd. Nor Jaafar	7,335	12.05	▲12.05
Total valid votes		60,852	100.00	
Total rejected ballots		1,526		
Unreturned ballots		150		
Turnout		62,528	78.30	▼0.23
Registered electors		79,861		
Majority		22,175	36.44	▲14.86
BN hold		Swing		

Malaysian general election, 1990
Party	Candidate	Votes	%	∆%
BN	Mohd. Tamrin Abdul Ghafar	35,561	60.79	▲4.02
S46	Rahim Ali	22,933	39.21	▲39.21
Total valid votes		58,494	100.00	
Total rejected ballots		2,369		
Unreturned ballots		0		
Turnout		60,863	78.53	▲4.50
Registered electors		77,505		
Majority		12,628	21.58	▼5.01
BN hold		Swing		

Malaysian general election, 1986
Party	Candidate	Votes	%	∆%
BN	Mohd. Tamrin Abdul Ghafar	25,282	56.77	▼20.05
DAP	Kan Yew Hong	13,440	30.18	▲30.18
PAS	Jaliluddin Abd Wahid	5,814	13.05	▼10.13
Total valid votes		44,536	100.00	
Total rejected ballots		1,360		
Unreturned ballots		0		
Turnout		45,896	74.03	▼2.87
Registered electors		62,000		
Majority		11,842	26.59	▲27.05
BN hold		Swing		

Malaysian general election, 1982
Party	Candidate	Votes	%	∆%
BN	Chong Hon Nyan	30,938	76.82	▲76.82
PAS	Jaliluddin Abdul Wahid	9,333	23.18	▲23.18
Total valid votes		40,271	100.00	
Total rejected ballots		1,496		
Unreturned ballots		0		
Turnout		41,767	76.90	
Registered electors		54,311		
Majority		21,605	53.64	
BN hold		Swing		

Malaysian general election, 1978
Party	Candidate	Votes	%	∆%
On the nomination day, Chong Hon Nyan won uncontested.
BN	Chong Hon Nyan			
Total valid votes			100.00	
Total rejected ballots				
Unreturned ballots				
Turnout				
Registered electors				
Majority				
BN hold		Swing		

Malaysian general election, 1974
Party	Candidate	Votes	%
BN	Chong Hon Nyan	18,182	64.47
Parti Rakyat Malaysia	Hasnul Abdul Hadi	8,111	28.76
Independent	Maidin Manaf	1,910	6.77
Total valid votes		28,203	100.00
Total rejected ballots		1,434	
Unreturned ballots		0	
Turnout		29,637	78.17
Registered electors		37,148	
Majority		10,071	35.71
This was a new constituency created.
