= Abdul Razak Abdul Rahman =

Malaysian politician

Yang Berhormat Datuk Wira Abdul Razak Abdul Rahman DCSM DPSM MLA
- عبد الرزاق بن عبد الرحمن

Member of the Malacca State Executive Council (Agriculture and Agro-based Industry, Entrepreneur Development and Regional and Rural Development: 26 November 2021–31 March 2023 & Tourism, Heritage, Arts and Culture: 5 April 2023–14 November 2026)
- In office 5 April 2023 – 14 November 2026
- Governor: Mohd Ali Rustam
- Deputy: Zaidi Attan
- Chief Minister: Ab Rauf Yusoh
- Preceded by: Muhammad Jailani Khamis (Tourism, Heritage and Culture); Portfolio established (Arts)
- Constituency: Telok Mas
- In office 26 November 2021 – 31 March 2023
- Governor: Mohd Ali Rustam
- Chief Minister: Sulaiman Md Ali
- Preceded by: Norhizam Hassan Baktee (Agriculture and Agro-based Industry & Entrepreneur Development); Idris Haron (Regional and Rural Development)
- Succeeded by: Muhamad Akmal Saleh (Rural Development and Agriculture); Allex Seah Shoo Chin (Entrepreneur Development); Portfolios abolished (Agro-based Industry and Regional Development)
- Constituency: Telok Mas

Member of the Malacca State Legislative Assembly for Telok Mas
- Incumbent
- Assumed office 20 November 2021
- Preceded by: Noor Effandi Ahmad (PH–BERSATU)
- Majority: 2,076 (2021); 11,114 (2026)

Faction represented in Malacca State Legislative Assembly
- 2021–: Barisan Nasional

Personal details
- Born: Abdul Razak bin Abdul Rahman; 14 June 1973 (age 53) Malacca, Malaysia
- Citizenship: Malaysian
- Party: United Malays National Organisation (UMNO)
- Other political affiliations: Barisan Nasional (BN)
- Occupation: Politician

Abdul Razak bin Abdul Rahman or more commonly known as "Tok Ajak" (born 14 June 1973) is a Malaysian politician who is a Member of the Malacca State Executive Council (EXCO) in the Barisan Nasional (BN) state administration under Chief Minister Ab Rauf Yusoh since April 2023 for the second term and under former Chief Minister Sulaiman Md Ali from November 2021 to March 2023 for the first term as well as Member of the Melaka State Legislative Assembly (MLA) for Telok Mas since November 2021. He is the Division Chief of Kota Melaka and a Member of the Supreme Council of the United Malays National Organisation (UMNO), a component party of the BN coalition.

== Political Career ==
Abdul Razak Abdul Rahman is a member of the United Malays National Organisation (UMNO). He contested the Telok Mas state constituency in the 2018 Malaysian general election and was elected as the Member of the Malacca State Legislative Assembly (MLA) for Telok Mas in the 2021 Malacca state election.

Following the 2021 state election, he was appointed as a Member of the Malacca State Executive Council under Chief Minister Sulaiman Md Ali, with responsibility for rural development, agriculture and agro-based industry. He served in the administration from November 2021 until March 2023. Utusan Malaysia

On 5 April 2023, he was reappointed to the Malacca State Executive Council under Chief Minister Ab Rauf Yusoh and was appointed Chairman of the State Committee for Tourism, Heritage, Arts and Culture.

== Political Positions ==
- Member of the Malacca State Legislative Assembly for Telok Mas (2021–present)
- Member of the Malacca State Executive Council (2021–present, with interruption in March–April 2023)
- Chairman of the Malacca State Committee for Tourism, Heritage, Arts and Culture (2023–present)
- UMNO Kota Melaka Division Chief
- Member of the UMNO Supreme Council for the 2023–2026 term

== Election results ==
Malacca State Legislative Assembly
Year	Constituency	Candidate	Votes	Pct	Opponent(s)	Votes	Pct	Ballots cast	Majority	Turnout
2018	N23 Telok Mas	Abdul Razak Abdul Rahman (UMNO)	6,406	37.11%	Noor Effandi Ahmad (BERSATU)	7,694	44.56%	17,500	1,288	85.60%
2018	N23 Telok Mas	Abdul Razak Abdul Rahman (UMNO)	6,406	37.11%	Rosazli Md Yasin (PAS)	3,164	18.33%	17,500	1,288	85.60%
2021	N23 Telok Mas	Abdul Razak Abdul Rahman (UMNO)	6,052	43.01%	Mohd Rafiq Naizamohideen (BERSATU)	3,976	28.25%	14,072	2,076	67.94%
2021	N23 Telok Mas	Abdul Razak Abdul Rahman (UMNO)	6,052	43.01%	Ashraf Mukhlis Minghat (AMANAH)	3,891	27.65%	14,072	2,076	67.94%
2021	N23 Telok Mas	Abdul Razak Abdul Rahman (UMNO)	6,052	43.01%	Muhammad Ariff Adly Mohammad (IND)	153	1.09%	14,072	2,076	67.94%
2026	N23 Telok Mas	Abdul Razak Abdul Rahman (UMNO)	16,015	73.35%	Mohamad Jaafar (AMANAH)	4,901	22.45%	21,834	11,114	73.89%
2026	N23 Telok Mas	Abdul Razak Abdul Rahman (UMNO)	16,015	73.35%	Muhammad Hazwan Mustafa (BERSAMA)	918	4.20%	21,834	11,114	73.89%

== Honours ==
- Malacca
  - Commander of the Exalted Order of Malacca (DCSM) – Datuk Wira (2023)
  - Lieutenant of the Exalted Order of Malacca (DPSM) – Datuk (2014)
