= Ghazale Muhamad =

Malaysian politician (born 1956)

Yang Berbahagia Datuk Wira Haji Ghazale Muhamad DCSM DMSM DSM JMN
- غزالي بن محمد

Deputy Speaker of the Malacca State Legislative Assembly
- In office 11 May 2020 – 4 October 2021
- Governor: Mohd Khalil Yaakob (May–June 2020); Mohd Ali Rustam (2020–2021)
- Chief Minister: Sulaiman Md Ali
- Speaker: Ab Rauf Yusoh
- Preceded by: Wong Fort Pin
- Succeeded by: Khaidirah Abu Zahar
- Constituency: Rim

Deputy Member of the Malacca State Executive Council
- In office 14 May 2013 – 11 May 2018 (Finance, Lands, Economic Planning, Investment, Religious Affairs, Heritage, Youth and Tourism) Serving with Sulaiman Md Ali & Norpipah Abdol
- Governor: Mohd Khalil Yaakob
- Chief Minister: Idris Haron
- Member: Idris Haron
- Preceded by: Ismail Othman (Finance, Lands and Economic Planning); Amiruddin Yusop (Investment); Mohd Yazed Khamis (Religious Affairs); Chua Kheng Hwa (Heritage and Tourism); Ab Rahman Ab Karim (Youth)
- Succeeded by: Position abolished
- Constituency: Rim

Member of the Malacca State Executive Council
- In office 1 April 2011 – 13 May 2013 (Transport, Information, Unity and Consumerism)
- Governor: Mohd Khalil Yaakob
- Chief Minister: Mohd Ali Rustam
- Preceded by: Perumal Raju
- Succeeded by: Abdul Ghafar Atan (Transport); Latiff Tamby Chik (Information, Unity and Consumerism)
- Constituency: Serkam

Member of the Malacca State Legislative Assembly for Rim
- In office 5 May 2013 – 20 November 2021
- Preceded by: Mohd Yazed Khamis (BN–UMNO)
- Succeeded by: Khaidirah Abu Zahar (BN–UMNO)
- Majority: 1,121 (2013); 536 (2018)

Member of the Malacca State Legislative Assembly for Serkam
- In office 8 March 2008 – 5 May 2013
- Preceded by: Ahmad Hamzah (BN–UMNO)
- Succeeded by: Zaidi Attan (BN–UMNO)
- Majority: 2,819 (2008)

Personal details
- Born: Ghazale bin Muhamad; 29 August 1956 (age 69) Malacca, Federation of Malaya
- Citizenship: Malaysian
- Party: United Malays National Organisation (UMNO)
- Other political affiliations: Barisan Nasional (BN)
- Occupation: Politician

Ghazale bin Muhamad (born 29 August 1956) is a Malaysian politician who served as Deputy Speaker of the Malacca State Legislative Assembly from May 2020 to October 2021, Deputy Member and Member of the Malacca State Executive Council (EXCO) in the Barisan Nasional (BN) state administration under former Chief Minister and former Member Idris Haron from May 2013 to the collapse of the BN state administration in May 2018 and under former Chief Minister Mohd Ali Rustam from April 2011 to May 2013. He also served as Member of the Malacca State Legislative Assembly (MLA) for Rim from May 2013 to November 2021 and for Serkam from March 2008 to May 2013. He is a member of the United Malays National Organisation (UMNO), a component party of the BN coalition.

== Election results ==
Malacca State Legislative Assembly
Year	Constituency	Candidate	Votes	Pct	Opponent(s)	Votes	Pct	Ballots cast	Majority	Turnout
2008	N26 Serkam	Ghazale Muhamad (UMNO)	6,997	62.61%	Kamarudin Sedik (PAS)	4,178	37.39%	11,363	2,819	83.33%
2013	N25 Rim	Ghazale Muhamad (UMNO)	4,821	56.58%	Azmi Kamis (PKR)	3,700	43.42%	8,678	1,121	86.40%
2018	N25 Rim	Ghazale Muhamad (UMNO)	5,301	46.80%	Shamsul Iskandar Mohd Akin (PKR)	4,765	42.06%	11,525	536	84.20%
2018	N25 Rim	Ghazale Muhamad (UMNO)	5,301	46.80%	Kintan Man (PAS)	1,262	11.14%	11,525	536	84.20%

== Honours ==
=== Honours of Malaysia ===
- Malaysia
  - Companion of the Order of the Defender of the Realm (JMN) (2013)
- Malacca
  - Knight Commander of the Exalted Order of Malacca (DCSM) – Datuk Wira (2016)
  - Companion Class I of the Exalted Order of Malacca (DMSM) – Datuk (2009)
  - Member of the Exalted Order of Malacca (DSM) (2003)
