= Malacca Utara =

Malacca constituency

Defunct federal constituency
- Legislature: Dewan Rakyat
- Constituency created: 1958
- Constituency abolished: 1974
- First contested: 1959
- Last contested: 1969

Malacca Utara was a federal constituency in Malacca, Malaysia, that was represented in the Dewan Rakyat from 1959 to 1974.

The federal constituency was created in the 1974 redistribution and was mandated to return a single member to the Dewan Rakyat under the first past the post voting system.

== History ==
It was abolished in 1974 when it was redistributed.

=== Representation history ===
Members of Parliament for Malacca Utara
Parliament	No	Years	Member	Party	Vote Share
Constituency created from Malacca Luar
Parliament of the Federation of Malaya
1st	P087	1959-1963	Abdul Ghani Ishak (عبدالغني اسحاق)	Alliance (UMNO)	11,078; 60.17%
Parliament of Malaysia
1st	P087	1963-1964	Abdul Ghani Ishak (عبدالغني اسحاق)	Alliance (UMNO)	11,078; 60.17%
2nd	P087	1964-1969	Abdul Ghani Ishak (عبدالغني اسحاق)	Alliance (UMNO)	16,892; 70.84%
		1969-1971	Parliament was suspended		
3rd	P087	1971-1973	Abdul Ghafar Baba (عبدالغفار باب)	Alliance (UMNO)	15,692; 63.86%
3rd	P087	1973-1974	Abdul Ghafar Baba (عبدالغفار باب)	BN (UMNO)	15,692; 63.86%
Constituency abolished, split into Alor Gajah and Batu Berendam

=== State constituency ===
Parliamentary constituency	State constituency						
Parliamentary constituency	1955–59*	1959–1974	1974–1986	1986–1995	1995–2004	2004–2018	2018–present
Malacca Utara		Alor Gajah					
Malacca Utara		Masjid Tanah					
Malacca Utara		Pulau Sebang					
Malacca Utara		Ramuan China					
Malacca Utara		Sungei Bahru					

=== Historical boundaries ===
State Constituency	Area
State Constituency	1959
Alor Gajah	Alor Gajah; Belimbing; Melaka Pindah; Parit Melana; Rembia
Masjid Tanah	Air Hitam Darat; Ayer Pa'abas; Lendu; Masjid Tanah; Tanjung Bidara
Pulau Sebang	Gadek; Hutan Percha; Kemuning; Pulau Sebang; Tanjung Rimau
Ramuan China	Brisu; Paya Lebar; Ramuan China; Simpang Ampat; Solok Limau Nipis
Sungei Bahru	Kampung Man Lok; Kuala Linggi; Paya Mengkuang; Pengkalan Balak; Sungei Bahru

== Election results ==
Malaysian general election, 1969: Malacca Utara
Party	Candidate	Votes	%	∆%
Alliance	Abdul Ghafar Baba	15,692	63.86	▼6.98
PMIP	Ali Md. Salleh	8,881	36.14	▲25.56
Total valid votes		24,573	100.00	
Total rejected ballots		1,515		
Unreturned ballots		0		
Turnout		26,088	78.49	▼5.43
Registered electors		33,237		
Majority		6,811	27.72	▼41.55
Alliance hold		Swing		

Malaysian general election, 1964: Malacca Utara
Party	Candidate	Votes	%	∆%
Alliance	Abdul Ghani Ishak	16,892	70.84	▲10.67
Socialist Front	Sulaiman Mohamed Attas	4,429	18.57	▲2.97
PMIP	Mohamed Yusof Sulong	2,523	10.58	▼13.65
Total valid votes		23,844	100.00	
Total rejected ballots		865		
Unreturned ballots		0		
Turnout		24,709	83.92	▲2.83
Registered electors		29,443		
Majority		12,463	69.27	▲33.33
Alliance hold		Swing		

Malayan general election, 1959: Malacca Utara
Party	Candidate	Votes	%
Alliance	Abdul Ghani Ishak	11,078	60.17
PMIP	Karim Dalib	4,461	24.23
Socialist Front	Abdul Karim Bakar	2,872	15.60
Total valid votes		18,411	100.00
Total rejected ballots		183	
Unreturned ballots		0	
Turnout		18,594	81.09
Registered electors		22,930	
Majority		6,617	35.94
This was a new constituency created.
