= Abdul Ghafar Baba =

Deputy Prime Minister of Malaysia (1986–1993)

Yang Amat Berbahagia Tun Datuk Seri Utama Abdul Ghafar Baba SSM SUMW PPM
- عبدالغفار باب
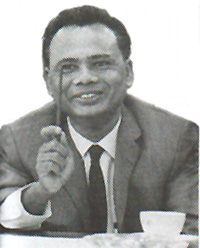

6th Deputy Prime Minister of Malaysia
- In office 10 May 1986 – 15 October 1993
- Monarchs: Iskandar; Azlan Shah
- Prime Minister: Mahathir Mohamad
- Preceded by: Musa Hitam
- Succeeded by: Anwar Ibrahim
- Constituency: Jasin

Minister of Rural Development (Minister of National and Rural Development: 23 September 1970 – 11 May 1972, 11 August 1986 – 20 May 1987) (Minister of Rural Economy Development: 11 May 1972 – 25 August 1974)
- In office 11 August 1986 – 1 December 1993
- Monarchs: Iskandar; Azlan Shah
- Prime Minister: Mahathir Mohamad
- Deputy: Tajol Rosli Mohd Ghazali (1986–1990); Ng Cheng Kuai (1986–1987); Mohd. Yasin Kamari (1990–1993)
- Preceded by: Sanusi Junid
- Succeeded by: Annuar Musa
- Constituency: Jasin
- In office 22 December 1970 – 4 September 1974
- Monarch: Abdul Halim
- Prime Minister: Abdul Razak Hussein
- Assistant Minister: Abdul Samad Idris (1970–1973)
- Preceded by: Abdul Razak Hussein
- Succeeded by: Himself as Minister of Agriculture and Rural Development
- Constituency: Malacca Utara

Minister of Agriculture and Rural Development
- In office 5 September 1974 – 14 January 1976
- Monarchs: Abdul Halim; Yahya Petra
- Prime Minister: Abdul Razak Hussein
- Deputy: Mokhtar Hashim (1974–1975); Mustapha Abdul Jabar (1975–1976)
- Preceded by: Himself (Rural Development); Mohamed Ghazali Jawi (Agriculture)
- Succeeded by: Ali Ahmad
- Constituency: Alor Gajah

2nd Chief Minister of Malacca
- In office 1 June 1959 – 5 October 1967
- Governor: Leong Yew Koh; Abdul Malek Yusuf
- Preceded by: Osman Talib
- Succeeded by: Talib Karim
- Constituency: Tanjong Kling

Personal details
- Born: 18 February 1925 Kuala Pilah, Negeri Sembilan, Federated Malay States, British Malaya (now Malaysia)
- Died: 23 April 2006 (aged 81) Gleneagles Intan Medical Centre, Kuala Lumpur, Malaysia
- Resting place: Makam Pahlawan, Masjid Negara, Kuala Lumpur
- Party: United Malays National Organisation (UMNO)
- Other political affiliations: Alliance Party; Barisan Nasional (BN)
- Spouse(s): Asmah Alang; Dayang Heryati Abdul Rahim
- Relations: Abdul Aziz Jaafar (son-in-law); Ahmad Hamzah (son-in-law); Zahid Arip (grandson)
- Children: Tamrin
- Occupation: Teacher

Abdul Ghafar bin Baba (Jawi: عبدالغفار بن باب; 18 February 1925 – 23 April 2006) was a Malaysian politician who served as the 6th Deputy Prime Minister of Malaysia from 1986 to 1993.

== Life and career ==
He was born on 18 February 1925 in Kuala Pilah, Negeri Sembilan, the son of impoverished villagers from Malacca state who emigrated as pastoral nomads, namely Baba Abdullah from Sungai Udang and his wife, Saodah Salleh from Bemban. Ghafar Baba became a teacher and later a member of the United Malays National Organisation (UMNO) political party, which is part of the Barisan Nasional coalition.

In 1943, he married Toh Puan Asmah Binti Alang (1927–2004) and they had twelve children, three of whom he outlived. In the early 1990s, he polygamously married his second wife, Toh Puan Heryati Abdul Rahim, with whom he had one child, and divorced in 2003.

In 1986, he was appointed Deputy Prime Minister by Prime Minister Mahathir Mohamad. The previous deputy premier, Musa Hitam, had resigned, citing irreconcilable differences with Mahathir. On 15 October 1993, during a UMNO election, he was challenged by Anwar Ibrahim. Ghafar Baba was defeated by Anwar and subsequently lost the deputy premiership.

He died on 23 April 2006, at Gleneagles Intan Medical Centre in Kuala Lumpur due to cardiopulmonary complications. He had been in critical condition for several months prior to his death. He was buried the same day in an official state funeral at Makam Pahlawan near Masjid Negara, Kuala Lumpur.

== Posts ==
- Teachers' Union secretary (1946–1948)
- Melaka UMNO Secretary (1951)
- Melaka UMNO Chairman (1957)
- Chief Minister of Malacca (1959–1967)
- UMNO Supreme Working Council member (1957)
- UMNO Information chief (1959)
- UMNO Vice President (1962–1987)
- Barisan Nasional Secretary-General
- Federal Territories Barisan Nasional liaison chief
- Deputy Prime Minister and UMNO Deputy President (1986–1993)

== Election results ==
Malacca State Legislative Assembly
Year	Constituency	Candidate	Votes	Pct	Opponent(s)	Votes	Pct	Ballots cast	Majority	Turnout
1959	N06 Tanjong Kling	Abdul Ghafar Baba (UMNO)	3,247	86.54%	Mohd Nor Noordin (PMIP)	505	13.46%	3,798	2,742	79.99%
1964	N01 Tanjong Kling	Abdul Ghafar Baba (UMNO)	3,834	79.46%	Manah Mohd (PRM)	649	13.45%	4,970	3,185	83.95%
1964	N01 Tanjong Kling	Abdul Ghafar Baba (UMNO)	3,834	79.46%	Mohd Nor Noordin (PMIP)	342	7.09%	4,970	3,185	83.95%

Parliament of Malaysia
Year	Constituency	Candidate	Votes	Pct	Opponent(s)	Votes	Pct	Ballots cast	Majority	Turnout
1969	P087 Malacca Utara	Abdul Ghafar Baba (UMNO)	15,692	63.86%	Ali Md. Salleh (PAS)	8,881	36.14%	26,088	6,811	78.49%
1974	P095 Alor Gajah	Abdul Ghafar Baba (UMNO)	20,890	78.89%	Abdul Ghani Long (PEKEMAS)	5,591	21.11%	27,750	15,299	77.76%
1978	P096 Jasin	Abdul Ghafar Baba (UMNO)	18,599	60.40%	Abdul Karim Abu (DAP)	6,532	21.21%	31,672	12,067	79.00%
1978	P096 Jasin	Abdul Ghafar Baba (UMNO)	18,599	60.40%	Jaliluddin Abd Wahid (PAS)	5,660	18.38%	31,672	12,067	79.00%
1982	P096 Jasin	Abdul Ghafar Baba (UMNO)	27,542	81.07%	Salleh Ayob (PAS)	6,432	18.93%	35,657	21,110	76.54%
1986	P114 Jasin	Abdul Ghafar Baba (UMNO)	20,772	76.35%	Rahimin Bani (PAS)	6,436	23.65%	28,200	14,336	71.21%
1990	P114 Jasin	Abdul Ghafar Baba (UMNO)	22,826	72.46%	Aris Konil (S46)	8,674	27.54%	32,519	14,152	77.93%
1995	P124 Jasin	Abdul Ghafar Baba (UMNO)	25,693	78.19%	Ahmad Mohd Alim (PAS)	4,856	14.78%	34,181	20,837	75.80%
1995	P124 Jasin	Abdul Ghafar Baba (UMNO)	25,693	78.19%	Aris Konil (S46)	2,310	7.03%	34,181	20,837	75.80%
1999	P122 Batu Berendam	Abdul Ghafar Baba (UMNO)	37,656	55.36%	Khalid Jaafar (KeADILan)	30,368	44.64%	69,592	7,288	78.82%

== Honours ==
=== Honours of Malaysia ===
- Malaysia
  - Recipient of the Malaysian Commemorative Medal (Gold) (PPM) (1965)
  - Grand Commander of the Order of Loyalty to the Crown of Malaysia (SSM) – Tun (1995)
- Federal Territory (Malaysia)
  - Grand Knight of the Order of the Territorial Crown (SUMW) – Datuk Seri Utama (2017–posthumously)

=== Foreign honours ===
- Soviet Union
  - Jubilee Medal of Moscow (1966)

=== Places named after him ===
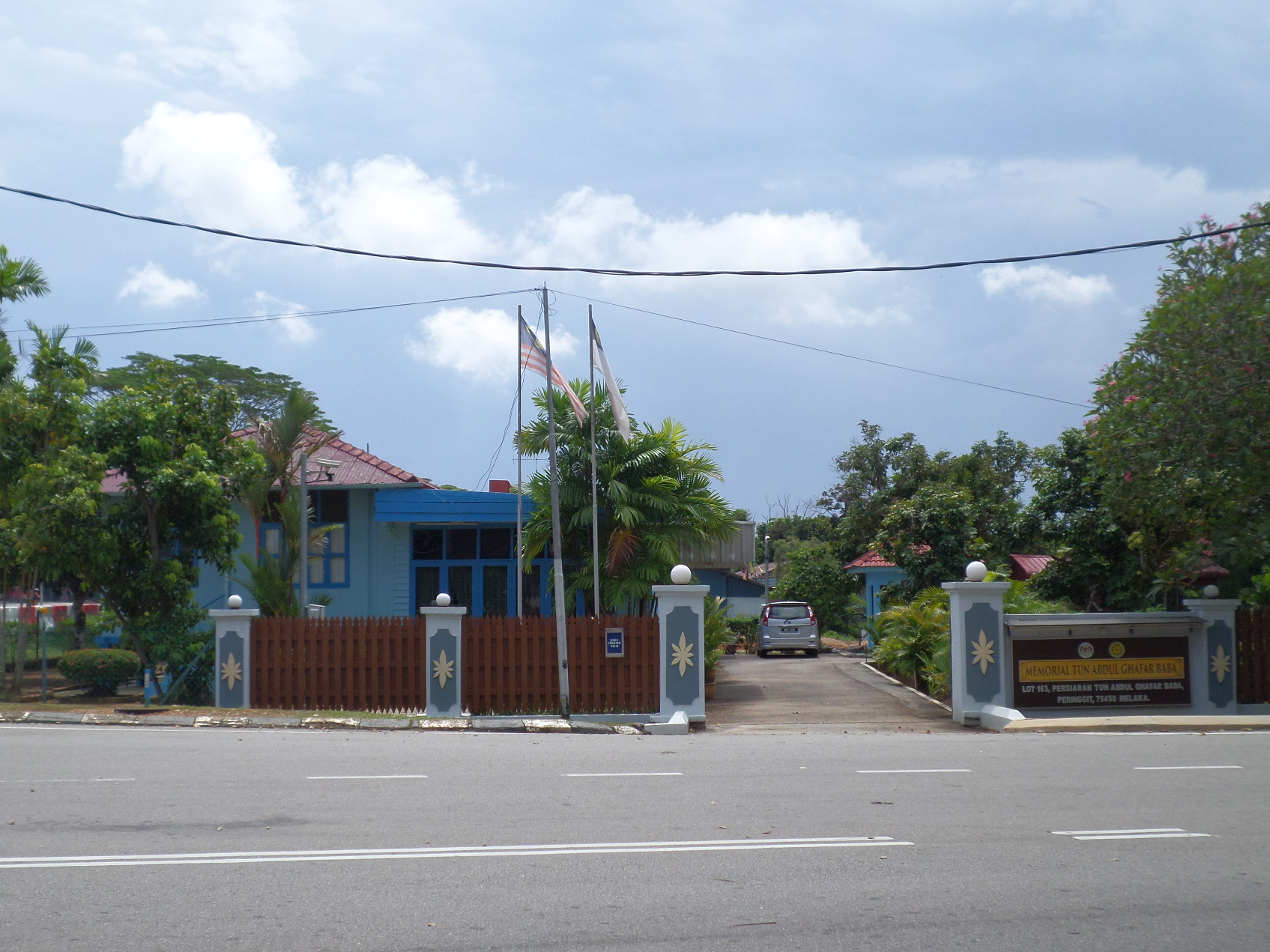
Tun Abdul Ghafar Baba Memorial

- Persiaran Tun Abdul Ghafar Baba, a major road at Peringgit, Malacca.
- Persimpangan Tun Abdul Ghafar, an intersections between Jalan Batu Berendam, Persiaran Tun Abdul Ghafar Baba and Lebuh Ayer Keroh at Peringgit, Malacca.
- The Tun Abdul Ghafar Baba Memorial, a memorial and museum in honour of his achievements located at Persiaran Tun Abdul Ghafar Baba in Peringgit, Malacca.
- MRSM Tun Ghafar Baba a MARA institution boarding school at Jasin, Malacca.
- SMK Ghafar Baba (formerly SMK Masjid Tanah), a secondary school at Masjid Tanah, Malacca.
- Tun Abdul Ghafar Baba Mosque, Sungai Udang, Malacca.
- Six FELDA settlements were renamed after him, they are FELDA Tun Ghafar Machap, FELDA Tun Ghafar Hutan Percha, FELDA Tun Ghafar Menggong, FELDA Tun Ghafar Kemendor, FELDA Tun Ghafar Air Kangkong and FELDA Tun Ghafar Bukit Senggeh.
- Kolej Tun Ghafar Baba, a residential college at Universiti Malaysia Perlis, Kuala Perlis, Perlis
- Kolej Tun Ghafar Baba, a residential college at Universiti Teknologi Malaysia, Skudai, Johor

== Notes and references ==
Preceded by Musa Hitam	Deputy Prime Minister of Malaysia; 1986 – 1 December 1993	Succeeded by Anwar Ibrahim
