= Merlimau (state constituency) =

State constituency in Melaka, Malaysia

Merlimau (N27)
Malacca constituency

State constituency
- Legislature: Malacca State Legislative Assembly
MLA
Muhamad Akmal Saleh
BN
- Constituency created: 1994
- First contested: 1995
- Last contested: 2026

Demographics
- Electors (2026): 19,759

N27 Merlimau within Malacca, as used for the 2021 state election

Merlimau is a state constituency in Malacca, Malaysia, that has been represented in the Melaka State Legislative Assembly. It has been represented by Member of the State Executive Council (EXCO) Muhamad Akmal Saleh of Barisan Nasional (BN) since 2021.

The state constituency was first contested in 1995 and is mandated to return a single Assemblyman to the Melaka State Legislative Assembly under the first-past-the-post voting system.

== Definition ==
The Merlimau constituency contains the polling districts of Ayer Merbau, Jasin Lalang, Merlimau Utara, Merlimau Pasir, Sempang, Pengkalan Samak and Permatang Serai.

== Demographics ==
Ethnic breakdown of Merlimau's electorate as of2026
1. Malays (71.6%)
2. Chinese (16.1%)
3. Indians (11.3%)
4. Other Ethnicities (0.90%)

== History ==
=== Polling districts ===
According to the gazette issued on 5 November 2026, the Merlimau constituency has a total of 7 polling districts.

State constituency	Polling districts	Code	Location
Merlimau (N27)	Ayer Merbau	139/27/01	SJK (C) Jasin Lalang
Merlimau (N27)	Jasin Lalang	133/27/02	SK Ayer Merbau
Merlimau (N27)	Merlimau Utara	139/27/03	SK Merlimau 2
Merlimau (N27)	Merlimau Pasir	139/27/04	SK Merlimau 1
Merlimau (N27)	Sempang	139/27/05	SK Sempang
Merlimau (N27)	Pengkalan Samak	139/27/06	SJK (C) Merlimau
Merlimau (N27)	Permatang Serai	139/27/07	SK Merlimau

=== Representation history ===
Members of the Legislative Assembly for Merlimau
Assembly	No	Years	Member	Party
Constituency created from Sungai Rambai, Ayer Panas, Rim and Serkam
9th	N23	1995 – 1999	Abu Zahar Ithnin	BN (UMNO)
10th	N23	1999 – 2004	Nazari Adzim	BN (UMNO)
11th	N27	2004 – 2008	Mohamad Hidhir Abu Hassan	BN (UMNO)
12th	N27	2008 – 2011	Mohamad Hidhir Abu Hassan	BN (UMNO)
12th	N27	2011 - 2013	Roslan Ahmad	BN (UMNO)
13th	N27	2013 – 2018	Roslan Ahmad	BN (UMNO)
14th	N27	2018 – 2021	Roslan Ahmad	BN (UMNO)
15th	N27	2021 – 2026	Muhamad Akmal Saleh	BN (UMNO)
16th	N27	2026 – present	Muhamad Akmal Saleh	BN (UMNO)

== Election results ==
Malacca state election, 2026
Party	Candidate	Votes	%	∆%
BN	Muhamad Akmal Saleh	11,703	79.71	▲21.28
PH	Rahayu Hamzah	2,979	20.29	▼4.45
Total valid votes		14,682	100.00	
Total rejected ballots		106		
Unreturned ballots		12		
Turnout		14,800	74.90	▲5.06
Registered electors		19,759		
Majority		8,724	59.42	▲25.73
BN hold		Swing		
Source(s) https://electiondata.my/elections/mlk/SE-16/

Malacca state election, 2021
Party	Candidate	Votes	%	∆%
BN	Muhamad Akmal Saleh	5,633	58.43	▲13.10
PH	Azrin Abdul Majid	2,385	24.74	▲24.74
PN	Abdul Alim Shapie	1,622	16.83	▲16.83
Total valid votes		9,640	100.00	
Total rejected ballots		122		
Unreturned ballots		26		
Turnout		9,788	69.84	▼15.96
Registered electors		14,014		
Majority		3,248	33.69	▲32.66
BN hold		Swing		
Source(s) https://lom.agc.gov.my/ilims/upload/portal/akta/outputp/1715764/PUB%20583.pdf

Malacca state election, 2018
Party	Candidate	Votes	%	∆%
BN	Roslan Ahmad	5,290	45.33	▼16.56
PKR	Yuhaizad Abdullah	5,160	44.30	▲44.30
PAS	Abd Malek Yusof	1,208	10.37	▼27.74
Total valid votes		11,648	100.00	
Total rejected ballots		149		
Unreturned ballots		52		
Turnout		11,849	85.80	▼1.62
Registered electors		13,810		
Majority		130	1.03	▼22.75
BN hold		Swing		

Malacca state election, 2013
Party	Candidate	Votes	%	∆%
BN	Roslan Ahmad	6,736	61.89	▼10.11
PAS	Yuhaizad Abdullah	4,147	38.11	▲10.11
Total valid votes		10,883	100.00	
Total rejected ballots		139		
Unreturned ballots		0		
Turnout		11,022	87.42	▲9.00
Registered electors		12,608		
Majority		2,589	23.78	▼20.22
BN hold		Swing		
Source(s) "Federal Government Gazette - Notice of Contested Election, State Legislative Assembly for the State of Selangor [P.U. (B) 192/2013]" (PDF). Attorney General's Chambers of Malaysia. 26 April 2013. Archived from the original (PDF) on 2019-12-29. "Federal Government Gazette - Results of Contested Election and Statements of the Poll after the Official Addition of Votes, State Constituencies for the State of Selangor [P.U. (B) 233/2013]" (PDF). Attorney General's Chambers of Malaysia. 22 May 2013.

Malacca state by-election, 6 March 2011 The by-election was called due to the death of incumbent, Mohamad Hidhir Abu Hassan.
Party	Candidate	Votes	%	∆%
BN	Roslan Ahmad	5,962	72.00	▲8.21
PAS	Yuhaizad Abdullah	2,319	28.00	▼8.21
Total valid votes		8,281	100.00	
Total rejected ballots		135		
Unreturned ballots		1		
Turnout		8,417	78.82	▲2.64
Registered electors		10,679		
Majority		3,643	44.00	▲16.42
BN hold		Swing		
Source(s) "Pilihan Raya Kecil N.27 Merlimau". Election Commission of Malaysia.

Malacca state election, 2008
Party	Candidate	Votes	%	∆%
BN	Mohamad Hidhir Abu Hassan	4,981	63.79	▼19.78
PAS	Jasme Topang	2,827	36.21	▲36.21
Total valid votes		7,808	100.00	
Total rejected ballots		149		
Unreturned ballots		20		
Turnout		7,977	76.18	▼1.71
Registered electors		10,471		
Majority		2,154	27.58	▼39.56
BN hold		Swing		

Malacca state election, 2004
Party	Candidate	Votes	%	∆%
BN	Mohamad Hidhir Abu Hassan	6,332	83.57	▲15.63
PKR	Jayathas Sirkunavelu	1,245	16.43	▲16.43
Total valid votes		7,577	100.00	
Total rejected ballots		232		
Unreturned ballots		15		
Turnout		7,824	78.04	▲2.54
Registered electors		10,026		
Majority		5,087	67.14	▲31.25

Melaka election, 1999
Party	Candidate	Votes	%	∆%
BN	Nazari Adzim	4,264	67.94	▼15.12
PAS	Jasme Tompang	2,012	32.06	▲32.06
Total valid votes		6,276	100.00	
Total rejected ballots		178		
Unreturned ballots		14		
Turnout		6,468	75.50	▲1.57
Registered electors		8,567		
Majority		2,252	35.88	▼30.25
BN hold		Swing		

Melaka election, 1995
Party	Candidate	Votes	%
BN	Abu Zahar Isnin	4,861	83.07
S46	Ahmad Baharuddin	991	16.93
Total valid votes		5,852	100.00
Total rejected ballots		171	
Unreturned ballots		10	
Turnout		6,033	73.93
Registered electors		8,160	
Majority		3,870	66.13
This was a new constituency created.
