= Serkam (state constituency) =

Political subdivision in Malaysia

Serkam (N26)
Malacca constituency

State constituency
- Legislature: Malacca State Legislative Assembly
MLA
Azman Abdullah
BN
- Constituency created: 1959
- First contested: 1959
- Last contested: 2026

Demographics
- Electors (2026): 21,352

N26 Serkam within Malacca, as used for the 2021 state election

Serkam is a state constituency in Malacca, Malaysia, that has been represented in the Melaka State Legislative Assembly.

== Demographics ==
Ethnic breakdown of Serkam's electorate as of 2026
1. Malays (90.7%)
2. Chinese (5.10%)
3. Indians (2.90%)
4. Other Ethnicities (1.30%)

== History ==
=== Polling districts ===
According to the gazette issued on 5 November 2026, the Serkam constituency has a total of 7 polling districts.

State constituency	Polling districts	Code	Location
Serkam (N26)	Bukit Tembakau	139/26/01	SK Bukit Tembakau
Serkam (N26)	Umbai	139/26/02	SK Datuk Haji Baginda
Serkam (N26)	Anjung Batu	139/26/03	SJK (C) Kuang Hwa
Serkam (N26)	Serkam Darat	139/26/04	SM Arab Assaiyidah Khadijah
Serkam (N26)	Pulai	139/26/05	SK Pulai
Serkam (N26)	Serkam Pantai	139/26/06	SK Serkam
Serkam (N26)	Tedong	139/26/07	SK Tedong

=== Representation history ===
Members of the Legislative Assembly for Serkam
Assembly	No	Years	Name	Party
Constituency created
1st	N19	1959-1964	Abdul Chudang	Alliance (UMNO)
2nd	N19	1964-1969	Abdul Ghani Ahmad	Alliance (UMNO)
		1969-1971	Assembly dissolved	
3rd	N19	1971-1974	Hussein Yahya	Alliance (UMNO)
3rd	N19	1971-1974	Hussein Yahya	BN (UMNO)
4th	N09	1974-1978	Abdul Aziz Alias	BN (UMNO)
5th	N09	1978-1982	Abdul Aziz Alias	BN (UMNO)
6th	N09	1982-1986	Nawawi Ahmad	BN (UMNO)
7th	N17	1986-1990	Arifin Baba	BN (UMNO)
8th	N17	1990-1991	Arifin Baba	BN (UMNO)
8th	N17	1991-1995	Mohd. Salleh Md. Ali	BN (UMNO)
9th	N24	1995-1999	Ahmad Hamzah	BN (UMNO)
10th	N24	1999-2004	Ahmad Hamzah	BN (UMNO)
11th	N26	2004-2008	Ahmad Hamzah	BN (UMNO)
12th	N26	2008-2013	Ghazale Muhamad	BN (UMNO)
13th	N26	2013-2018	Zaidi Attan	BN (UMNO)
14th	N26	2018-2021	Zaidi Attan	BN (UMNO)
15th	N26	2021–2026	Zaidi Attan	BN (UMNO)
16th	N26	2026 – present	Azman Abdullah	BN (UMNO)

== Election results ==
Malacca state election, 2026
Party	Candidate	Votes	%	∆%
BN	Azman Abdullah	14,632	86.07	▲42.75
PH	Muhammad Faiq Azman	1,943	11.43	▼1.77
BERSAMA	Muhammad Saffie Md Salam	425	2.50	▲2.50
Total valid votes		17,000		
Total rejected ballots		104		
Unreturned ballots		8		
Turnout		17,112	80.14	▲5.90
Registered electors		21,352		
Majority		12,689	74.64	▲73.96
BN hold		Swing		
Source(s) https://electiondata.my/elections/mlk/SE-16/

Malacca state election, 2021
Party	Candidate	Votes	%	∆%
BN	Zaidi Attan	5,038	43.32	▼4.14
PN	Ahmad Bilal Rahaudin	4,959	42.54	▲42.54
PH	Mohd Kohmeni Kamal	1,535	13.20	▲13.20
Independent	Norazlanshah Hazali	99	0.85	▲0.85
Total valid votes		11,631	100.00	
Total rejected ballots		200		
Unreturned ballots		30		
Turnout		11,861	74.24	▼12.90
Registered electors		15,977		
Majority		79	0.68	▼19.61
BN hold		Swing		
Source(s) https://lom.agc.gov.my/ilims/upload/portal/akta/outputp/1715764/PUB%20583.pdf

Malacca state election, 2018
Party	Candidate	Votes	%	∆%
BN	Zaidi Attan	6,401	47.46	▼15.56
PKR	Nor Khairi Yusof	3,664	27.16	▲27.16
PAS	Ahmad Bilal Rahudin	3,423	25.38	▼11.61
Total valid votes		13,488	100.00	
Total rejected ballots		191		
Unreturned ballots		43		
Turnout		13,722	87.13	▼3.25
Registered electors		15,748		
Majority		2,737	20.29	▼5.74
BN hold		Swing		

Malacca state election, 2013
Party	Candidate	Votes	%	∆%
BN	Zaidi Attan	8,715	63.02	▲0.40
PAS	Kamarudin Sedik	5,115	36.98	▼0.40
Total valid votes		13,830	100.00	
Total rejected ballots		185		
Unreturned ballots		33		
Turnout		14,048	90.38	▲7.05
Registered electors		15,543		
Majority		3,600	26.03	▲0.80
BN hold		Swing		

Malacca state election, 2008
Party	Candidate	Votes	%	∆%
BN	Ghazale Muhamad	6,997	62.61	▼8.41
PAS	Kamarudin Sedik	4,178	37.39	▲8.41
Total valid votes		11,175	100.00	
Total rejected ballots		173		
Unreturned ballots		15		
Turnout		11,363	83.33	▼0.18
Registered electors		13,636		
Majority		2,819	25.23	▼16.81
BN hold		Swing		

Malacca state election, 2004
Party	Candidate	Votes	%	∆%
BN	Ahmad Hamzah	7,344	71.02	▲11.49
PAS	Kamarudin Sedik	2,997	28.98	▼11.49
Total valid votes		10,341	100.00	
Total rejected ballots		176		
Unreturned ballots		6		
Turnout		10,523	83.52	▲2.74
Registered electors		12,600		
Majority		4,347	42.04	▲22.98
BN hold		Swing		

Malacca state election, 1999
Party	Candidate	Votes	%	∆%
BN	Ahmad Hamzah	5,902	59.53	▼13.17
PAS	Halim Ramli	4,013	40.47	▲13.17
Total valid votes		9,915	100.00	
Total rejected ballots		262		
Unreturned ballots		10		
Turnout		10,187	80.78	▲1.32
Registered electors		12,611		
Majority		1,889	19.05	▼26.33
BN hold		Swing		

Malacca state election, 1995
Party	Candidate	Votes	%	∆%
BN	Ahmad Hamzah	6,594	72.69	▲3.10
PAS	Md Said Omar	2,477	27.31	▼3.10
Total valid votes		9,071	100.00	
Total rejected ballots		163		
Unreturned ballots		12		
Turnout		9,246	79.46	▲7.21
Registered electors		11,636		
Majority		4,117	45.39	▲6.21
BN hold		Swing		

Malacca state by-election, 14 December 1991 Upon the death of the incumbent, Arifin Baba
Party	Candidate	Votes	%	∆%
BN	Md Saleh Md Ali	6,764	69.59	▼3.89
PAS	Said Omar	2,956	30.41	▲3.89
Total valid votes		9,720	100.00	
Total rejected ballots		121		
Unreturned ballots		7		
Turnout		9,848	72.25	▼6.86
Registered electors		13,631		
Majority		3,808	39.18	▼7.77
BN hold		Swing		

Malacca state election, 1990
Party	Candidate	Votes	%	∆%
BN	Arifin Baba	7,617	73.47	▲1.51
PAS	Salleh Ayolo	2,750	26.53	▼1.51
Total valid votes		10,367	100.00	
Total rejected ballots		396		
Unreturned ballots		20		
Turnout		10,783	79.11	▲7.17
Registered electors		13,631		
Majority		4,867	46.95	▲3.02
BN hold		Swing		

Malacca state election, 1986
Party	Candidate	Votes	%	∆%
BN	Arifin Baba	6,476	71.96	▲0.04
PAS	Abdul Hamid Samad	2,523	28.04	▼0.04
Total valid votes		8,999	100.00	
Total rejected ballots		392		
Unreturned ballots		0		
Turnout		9,391	71.93	▼4.23
Registered electors		13,055		
Majority		3,953	43.93	▲0.08
BN hold		Swing		

Malacca state election, 1982
Party	Candidate	Votes	%	∆%
BN	Nawawi Ahmad	4,926	71.92	▲9.53
PAS	Salleh Ayob	1,923	28.08	▲1.99
Total valid votes		6,849	100.00	
Total rejected ballots		166		
Unreturned ballots		0		
Turnout		7,015	76.17	▼1.62
Registered electors		9,210		
Majority		3,003	43.85	▲7.54
BN hold		Swing		

Malacca state election, 1978
Party	Candidate	Votes	%	∆%
BN	Abdul Aziz Alias	3,686	62.39	▼20.59
PAS	Mansor Ngah	1,541	26.08	▲26.08
DAP	Md. Ramli Md. Natar	681	11.53	▲11.53
Total valid votes		5,908	100.00	
Total rejected ballots		230		
Unreturned ballots		0		
Turnout		6,138	77.78	▲1.04
Registered electors		7,891		
Majority		2,145	36.31	▼29.65
BN hold		Swing		

Malacca state election, 1974
Party	Candidate	Votes	%	∆%
BN	Abdul Aziz Alias	4,085	82.98	▲25.52
PEKEMAS	Abdul Chudang	838	17.02	▲17.02
Total valid votes		4,923	100.00	
Total rejected ballots		284		
Unreturned ballots		0		
Turnout		5,207	76.74	▼5.23
Registered electors		6,785		
Majority		3,247	65.96	▲44.09
BN gain from Alliance		Swing		-

Malacca state election, 1969
Party	Candidate	Votes	%	∆%
Alliance	Hussain Yahya	2,804	57.46	▼5.70
PMIP	Abdul Rahim Baba	1,737	35.59	▲6.04
Parti Sosialis Rakyat Malaysia	Mohd. Salleh Mohamad	339	6.95	▼0.34
Total valid votes		4,880	100.00	
Total rejected ballots		49		
Unreturned ballots		0		
Turnout		4,929	81.97	▼0.72
Registered electors		6,013		
Majority		1,067	21.86	▼11.74
Alliance hold		Swing		

Malacca state election, 1964
Party	Candidate	Votes	%	∆%
Alliance	Ab. Ghani Ahmad	2,686	63.16	▼3.80
PMIP	Mohamed Taha Kallu	1,257	29.56	▼3.48
Socialist Front	Abdullah Mat Amin	310	7.29	▲7.29
Total valid votes		4,253	100.00	
Total rejected ballots		237		
Unreturned ballots		0		
Turnout		4,490	82.69	▲0.27
Registered electors		5,430		
Majority		1,429	33.60	▼0.32
Alliance hold		Swing		

Malacca state election, 1959
Party	Candidate	Votes	%
Alliance	Abdul Chudang	2,357	66.96
PMIP	Mohamed Taha Kallu	1,163	33.04
Total valid votes		3,520	100.00
Total rejected ballots		48	
Unreturned ballots		0	
Turnout		3,568	82.42
Registered electors		4,329	
Majority		1,194	33.92
This was a new constituency created.
