= Bau Wong Bau Ek =

Malaysian politician

Yang Berhormat Tuan Bau Wong Bau Ek MLA

State Leader of the Opposition of Kedah
- Incumbent
- Assumed office 26 November 2023
- Monarch: Sallehuddin
- Menteri Besar: Muhammad Sanusi Md Nor
- Preceded by: Zamri Yusuf
- Constituency: Sidam

Member of the Kedah State Legislative Assembly for Sidam
- Incumbent
- Assumed office 12 August 2023
- Preceded by: Robert Ling Kui Ee (PH–PKR)
- Majority: 954 (2023)

Personal details
- Born: Bau Wong a/l Bau Ek
- Citizenship: Malaysian
- Party: People's Justice Party (PKR)
- Other political affiliations: Pakatan Harapan (PH)
- Parent: Bau Ek Endin Soon (father)
- Occupation: Politician

Bau Wong a/l Bau Ek is a Malaysian politician who has served as State Leader of the Opposition of Kedah since November 2023 and Member of the Kedah State Legislative Assembly (MLA) for Sidam since August 2023. He served as Special Officer to the Members of Parliament (MPs) for Sungai Petani Johari Abdul and Mohammed Taufiq Johari from 2018 to 2023. He is a member of the People's Justice Party (PKR), a component party of the Pakatan Harapan (PH) coalition. He is also the first ever Siamese Leader of the Opposition and elected representative in the history of Kedah.

== Political career ==
Bau Wong was formerly the special officer to former Sungai Petani Member of Parliament, Johari Abdul from 2018 to 2022 and then continued the same service to Dr Mohammed Taufiq Johari who won the parliamentary seat in the 15th General Election.

On 28 July 2023, he ended his service to contest in the state elections.

== Election results ==
Kedah State Legislative Assembly
Year	Constituency	Candidate	Votes	Pct	Opponent(s)	Votes	Pct	Ballots cast	Majority	Turnout
2023	N29 Sidam	Bau Wong Bau Ek (PKR)	21,859	51.12%	Juliana Abdul Ghani (BERSATU)	20,905	48.88%	43,093	954	70.66%
