= Lim Soo Nee =

Malaysian politician

Lim Soo Nee AMK JP
- 林思年

Member of the Kedah State Executive Council
- In office 26 August 2009 – 5 May 2013 (Tourism, Community Development and Human Resources)
- Monarch: Abdul Halim
- Menteri Besar: Azizan Abdul Razak
- Preceded by: Mohd Radzhi Salleh
- Constituency: Kulim

Member of the Kedah State Legislative Assembly for Kulim
- In office 8 March 2008 – 5 May 2013
- Preceded by: Boey Chin Gan (BN–MCA)
- Succeeded by: Chua Thiong Gee (BN–MCA)
- Majority: 1,244 (2008)

Personal details
- Born: Lim Soo Nee
- Citizenship: Malaysian
- Party: People's Justice Party (PKR)
- Other political affiliations: Pakatan Rakyat (PR) 2008–2015); Pakatan Harapan (PH) 2015–present)
- Spouse: Woon Nyok Yen
- Children: 4
- Occupation: Politician

Lim Soo Nee (Chinese: 林思年; pinyin: Lín Sīnián) is a Malaysian politician. He was the Kedah State Legislative Assemblyman for Kulim from 2008 until 2013. In 2009, he was appointed as an EXCO member to replace the Lunas assemblyman, Mohd Radzhi Salleh who had left the PKR.

== Election results ==
Kedah State Legislative Assembly
Year	Constituency	Candidate	Votes	Pct	Opponent(s)	Votes	Pct	Ballots cast	Majority	Turnout
2004	N29 Sidam	Lim Soo Nee (PKR)	4,153	29.76%	Fong Chok Gin (Gerakan)	10,287	71.24%	14,799	6,134	74.56%
2008	N35 Kulim	Lim Soo Nee (PKR)	10,559	50.34%	Lim Lee Choo (MCA)	9,315	44.41%	21,751	1,244	76.06%
2008	N35 Kulim	Lim Soo Nee (PKR)	10,559	50.34%	Khairul Anuar Ramli (IND)	1,101	5.25%	21,751	1,244	76.06%

== Honours ==
- Kedah :
  - Member of the Order of the Crown of Kedah (AMK) (2009)
  - Justice of the Peace (JP) (2013)
