= Tan Chow Kang =

Malaysian politician

Tan Chow Kang AMK JP
- 陈楚江

Member of the Kedah State Executive Council
- In office 10 March 2010 – 2013
- Monarch: Abdul Halim
- Menteri Besar: Azizan Abdul Razak
- Portfolio: Environment, Chinese Community Affairs and Transport
- Preceded by: Tan Wei Shu
- Succeeded by: Leong Yong Kong (Environment, Chinese Community Affairs); Tajul Urus Mat Zain (Transport)
- Constituency: Sidam

Member of the Kedah State Legislative Assembly for Sidam
- In office 8 March 2008 – 5 May 2013
- Preceded by: Fong Chok Gin (BN–Gerakan)
- Succeeded by: Robert Ling Kui Ee (PR–PKR)
- Majority: 3,618 (2008)

Personal details
- Born: 17 November 1942 (age 83)
- Party: Labour Party of Malaya (1959–1972); Parti Gerakan Rakyat Malaysia (1982–1983); National Justice Party (keADILan) (2001–2003); People's Justice Party (PKR) (2003–2016); Parti Rakyat Malaysia (PRM) (2018–present)
- Other political affiliations: Pakatan Rakyat (PR) (−2015); Pakatan Harapan (PH) (−2018)

Tan Joon Long @ Tan Chow Kang or commonly known as Tan Chow Kang (Chinese: 陈楚江; born 17 November 1942) is a Malaysian politician. While representing Parti Keadilan Rakyat, he served as a Kedah State Executive Council (EXCO) member from March 2010 to May 2013.

This was in the Pakatan Rakyat (PR) administration under Menteri Besar Azizan Abdul Razak. He was Kedah State Legislative Assembly representative for Sidam from March 2008 to May 2013. Formerly with the Labour Party of Malaya and Gerakan, he is now with the Parti Rakyat Malaysia (PRM).

== Political career ==
A young socialist, he joined the Labour Party in 1959, staying a member until its dissolution on 6 September 1972. In 1982, he joined Gerakan but later quit the party because his political ideas were not compatible. On 1 June 2001, he joined the Parti Keadilan Nasional, predecessor of PKR.

In the 2008 Kedah state election, he defeated the candidate from Barisan Nasional, Fong Chok Gin with a majority of 3,618 votes. He obtained 9,470 votes compared to his opponent who obtained only 5,852 votes.

On 10 March 2010, he was appointed as Member of the Kedah State Executive Council (EXCO), replacing Tan Wei Shu who was dismissed by Menteri Besar Azizan Abdul Razak. He held the portfolio of Environment and Chinese Community Affairs.

Already in his 70s, he was not nominated by his party to contest the 2013 Kedah state election and Sidam state seat and was replaced by Robert Ling Kui Ee.

On 14 March 2016, Tan Chow Kang announced his resignation from PKR and established Sidam Branch of the Parti Rakyat Malaysia to continue to fight for the concept of socialism.

In 2018, he contested the Sungkai Bakap state seat under PRM but got just 55 votes and lost his deposit.

In 2022, he ran for the Sungai Petani parliamentary seat during the week of his 80th birthday. However, in a five-way contest won by PKR’s Taufiq Johari, he polled very few votes.

== Election results ==
Kedah State Legislative Assembly
Year	Constituency	Candidate	Votes	Pct	Opponent(s)	Votes	Pct	Ballots cast	Majority	Turnout
2008	N29 Sidam	Tan Chow Kang (PKR)	9,470	62.92%	Fong Chok Gin (Gerakan)	5,852	37.08%	15,747	3,618	75.25%

Penang State Legislative Assembly
Year	Constituency	Candidate	Votes	Pct	Opponent(s)	Votes	Pct	Ballots cast	Majority	Turnout
2018	N20 Sungai Bakap	Tan Chow Kang (PRM)	55	0.20%	Amar Pritpal Abdullah (PKR)	10,386	45.60%	23,217	2,348	87.10%
2018	N20 Sungai Bakap	Tan Chow Kang (PRM)	55	0.20%	Mohamed Sani Bakar (UMNO)	8,038	35.30%	23,217	2,348	87.10%
2018	N20 Sungai Bakap	Tan Chow Kang (PRM)	55	0.20%	Osman Jaafar (PAS)	4,316	18.90%	23,217	2,348	87.10%

Parliament of Malaysia
Year	Constituency	Candidate	Votes	Pct	Opponent(s)	Votes	Pct	Ballots cast	Majority	Turnout
2022	P015 Sungai Petani	Tan Chow Kang (PRM)	226	0.17%	Mohammed Taufiq Johari (PKR)	50,580	38.91%	131,447	1,115	77.85%
2022	P015 Sungai Petani	Tan Chow Kang (PRM)	226	0.17%	Robert Ling Kui Ee (BERSATU)	49,465	38.05%	131,447	1,115	77.85%
2022	P015 Sungai Petani	Tan Chow Kang (PRM)	226	0.17%	Shahanim Mohamad Yusoff (UMNO)	27,391	21.07%	131,447	1,115	77.85%
2022	P015 Sungai Petani	Tan Chow Kang (PRM)	226	0.17%	Marzuki Yahya (PEJUANG)	2,342	1.80%	131,447	1,115	77.85%

== Honours ==
- Kedah
  - Member of the Order of the Crown of Kedah (AMK) (2009)
  - Justice of the Peace (JP) (2012)
