= Fong Chok Gin =

Malaysian politician

Yang Berbahagia Dato' Fong Chok Gin DSDK JP
- 方卓仁

Member of the Kedah State Executive Council
- In office 1998–2008

Member of the Kedah State Legislative Assembly for Sidam
- In office 25 April 1995 – 8 March 2008
- Preceded by: constituency established
- Succeeded by: Tan Chow Kang (PR–PKR)
- Majority: 5,813 (1995); 5,482 (1999); 6,134 (2004)

Personal details
- Born: Fong Chok Gin; 17 October 1945 (age 80)
- Citizenship: Malaysia
- Party: Parti Gerakan Rakyat Malaysia (Gerakan)
- Other political affiliations: Barisan Nasional (BN) (until 2018); Perikatan Nasional (PN) (since 2021)
- Occupation: Politician

Fong Chok Gin (born 17 October 1945) is a Malaysian politician who served as Member of the Kedah State Executive Council (EXCO) in the Barisan Nasional (BN) state administration under former Menteris Besar Sanusi Junid from 1998 to 1999, Syed Razak Syed Zain Barakbah from 1999 to 2005 and Mahdzir Khalid from 2005 to 2008 and Member of the Kedah State Legislative Assembly (MLA) for Sidam from April 1995 to March 2008.

== Political career ==
Fong Chok Gin first elected as Sidam assemblyman in 1995 general election. He was reelected as Sidam assemblyman in 1999 and 2004 general election. He fail reelected as Sidam assemblyman in 2008 general election after lost to Tan Chow Kang from PKR.

In 1998, he was appointed as Kedah Exco in charge of Health and Consumer Affairs. In 1999, he was reappointed as Kedah Exco in charge of Transport and Public Works. In 2004, he was reappointed as Kedah Exco.

== Election results ==
Kedah State Legislative Assembly
Year	Constituency	Candidate	Votes	Pct	Opponent(s)	Votes	Pct	Ballots cast	Majority	Turnout
1995	N29 Sidam	Fong Chok Gin (Gerakan)	9,230	63.06%	Chong Ah Lek (DAP)	3,417	23.35%	14,999	5,813	70.56%
1995	N29 Sidam	Fong Chok Gin (Gerakan)	9,230	63.06%	Jamaludin Yahaya (PAS)	1,989	13.59%	14,999	5,813	70.56%
1999	N29 Sidam	Fong Chok Gin (Gerakan)	11,038	66.52%	Gnanaguru Ganisan (DAP)	5,556	34.48%	17,134	5,482	71.96%
2004	N29 Sidam	Fong Chok Gin (Gerakan)	10,287	71.24%	Lim Soo Nee (PKR)	4,153	29.76%	14,799	6,134	74.56%
2008	N29 Sidam	Fong Chok Gin (Gerakan)	5,852	37.08%	Tan Chow Kang (PKR)	9,470	62.92%	15,747	3,618	75.25%

== Honours ==
- Kedah
  - Knight Companion of the Order of Loyalty to the Royal House of Kedah (DSDK) – Dato' (1999)
  - Justice of the Peace (JP) (1992)
  - Dato' Jaya Dermawan (2008)
