= Johari Abdul =

Malaysian politician

Yang Berhormat Tan Sri Dato' Johari Abdul PSM DSDK
- جوهري عبد
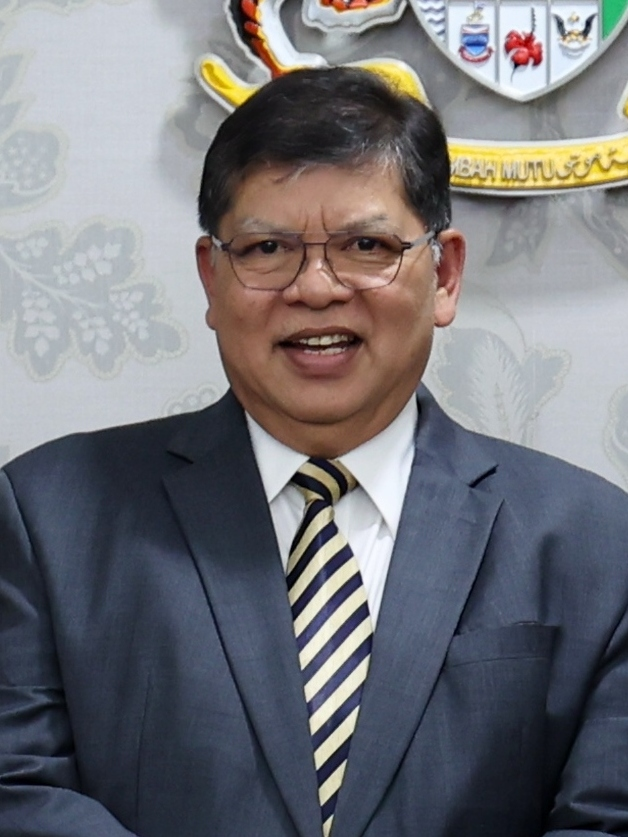
- Johari in 2024

11th Speaker of the Dewan Rakyat
- Incumbent
- Assumed office 19 December 2022
- Monarchs: Abdullah (2022–2024); Ibrahim Iskandar (since 2024)
- Prime Minister: Anwar Ibrahim
- Deputy: Ramli Mohd Nor; Alice Lau Kiong Yieng
- Preceded by: Azhar Azizan Harun
- Constituency: Non-MP

State Leader of the Opposition of Kedah
- In office 31 October 2022 – 18 December 2022
- Monarch: Sallehuddin
- Menteri Besar: Muhammad Sanusi Md Nor
- Preceded by: Phahrolrazi Mohd Zawawi
- Succeeded by: Zamri Yusuf
- Constituency: Gurun

Member of the Malaysian Parliament for Sungai Petani
- In office 8 March 2008 – 19 November 2022
- Preceded by: Mahadzir Mohd Khir (BN–UMNO)
- Succeeded by: Mohammed Taufiq Johari (PH–PKR)
- Majority: 9,381 (2008); 9,548 (2013); 21,569 (2018)

Member of the Kedah State Legislative Assembly for Gurun
- In office 9 May 2018 – 18 December 2022
- Preceded by: Leong Yong Kong (BN–MCA)
- Succeeded by: Baddrol Bakhtiar (PN–PAS)
- Majority: 4,207 (2018)

Chairman of the Pakatan Harapan Backbenchers Club
- In office 6 August 2018 – 19 November 2022
- Monarchs: Muhammad V (2018–2019); Abdullah (2019–2022)
- Prime Minister: Mahathir Mohamad (2018–2020); Muhyiddin Yassin (2020–2021); Ismail Sabri Yaakob (2021–2022)
- Constituency: Sungai Petani

State Chairman of the Pakatan Harapan of Kedah
- In office 5 March 2020 – 10 September 2022
- National Chairman: Anwar Ibrahim
- Preceded by: Mukhriz Mahathir
- Succeeded by: Mahfuz Omar

Personal details
- Born: Johari bin Abdul; May 1955 (age 71) Tikam Batu, Sungai Petani, Kedah, Federation of Malaya (now Malaysia)
- Party: United Malays National Organisation (UMNO) (1990s–1999); National Justice Party (KeADILan) (1999–2003); People's Justice Party (PKR) (2003–present)
- Other political affiliations: Barisan Nasional (BN) (1990s–1999); Barisan Alternatif (BA) (1999–2004); Pakatan Rakyat (PR) (2008–2015); Pakatan Harapan (PH) (2015–present)
- Spouse: Noraini Mohd
- Relations: Shuaib Lazim (uncle)
- Children: 8 (including Mohammed Taufiq)
- Education: Tikam Batu Elementary School; Ibrahim High School
- Alma mater: University of Malaya (BA); National Institute of Public Administration (DPA); Lancaster University (MA)
- Occupation: Politician
- Johari Abdul on Parliament of Malaysia

Johari bin Abdul (Jawi: جوهري بن عبد; born May 1955) is a Malaysian politician who is the 11th Speaker of the Dewan Rakyat, the lower house of Parliament. Previously, he served as the State Leader of the Opposition of Kedah beginning in October 2022 and was a Member of the Kedah State Legislative Assembly (MLA) for Gurun from May 2018 until his resignation in December 2022, upon which he became Speaker. He was also the Member of Parliament (MP) for Sungai Petani from March 2008 and held the role of Chairman of the Pakatan Harapan Backbenchers Club (PHBBC) from August 2018 to November 2022. Johari is a member of the People's Justice Party (PKR), a component party of the Pakatan Harapan (PH) coalition. He is also the father of Minister of Youth and Sports and Sungai Petani MP Mohammed Taufiq Johari.

== Early life and education ==
Johari bin Abdul was born on May 1955. His uncle, Shuaib Lazim, was a political figure within UMNO in Sungai Petani, having served as the Head of UMNO for the Sungai Petani Division and as a senator in the Dewan Negara from April 1985 to July 1991. Johari attended Tikam Batu Elementary School and Ibrahim High School in Sungai Petani before pursuing higher education at the University of Malaya, where he earned a Bachelor of Arts (BA). He later attended the National Institute of Public Administration (INTAN) to train as an Administrative and Diplomatic Officer (PTD). Johari also holds a Master of Arts (MA) in Strategic Studies from the University of Lancaster.

== Early career ==
He began his Administrative and Diplomatic Officer (PTD) career as an officer in Kuala Lumpur City Hall (DBKL) and the Public Service Department Malaysia (JPA). He also served in the Malaysian Prime Minister's Department (JPM) and the Malaysian Students Department (Jabatan Penuntut Malaysia, MSD). Later, he became the director of the investment department for Yayasan Dakwah Islamiah Malaysia (YADIM) and also served as the director of the National Civics Bureau (BTN).

== Political career ==
Johari was elected as Committee Member (AJK) of United Malays National Organisation (UMNO) Sungai Petani, Kedah. This ended when he switched parties to People's Justice Party (PKR). He was elected as the MP for Sungai Petani in the 2008 general election, defeating Minister of Information Zainuddin Maidin from the ruling Barisan Nasional (BN) coalition and re-elected in the 2013 and 2018 general elections. He was also elected as the MLA for Gurun in the 2018 general election, defeating Boey Chin Gan from the ruling BN coalition.

Johari holds the position of Member of the PKR Supreme Leadership Council and Chairman of the PKR Kedah Leadership Council. He has also served as the State Chairman of Kedah's PKR from March 2020 until September 2022.

Johari was supposed to be the future Menteri Besar of Kedah in 2018 Kedah state election, but the position was given to Mukhriz Mahathir. He once suggested Muhammad Sanusi Md Nor to be the Menteri Besar of Kedah in his capacity as the State Chairman of PH of Kedah in March 2020 during 2020 Kedah political turmoil.

== Speaker of the Dewan Rakyat ==
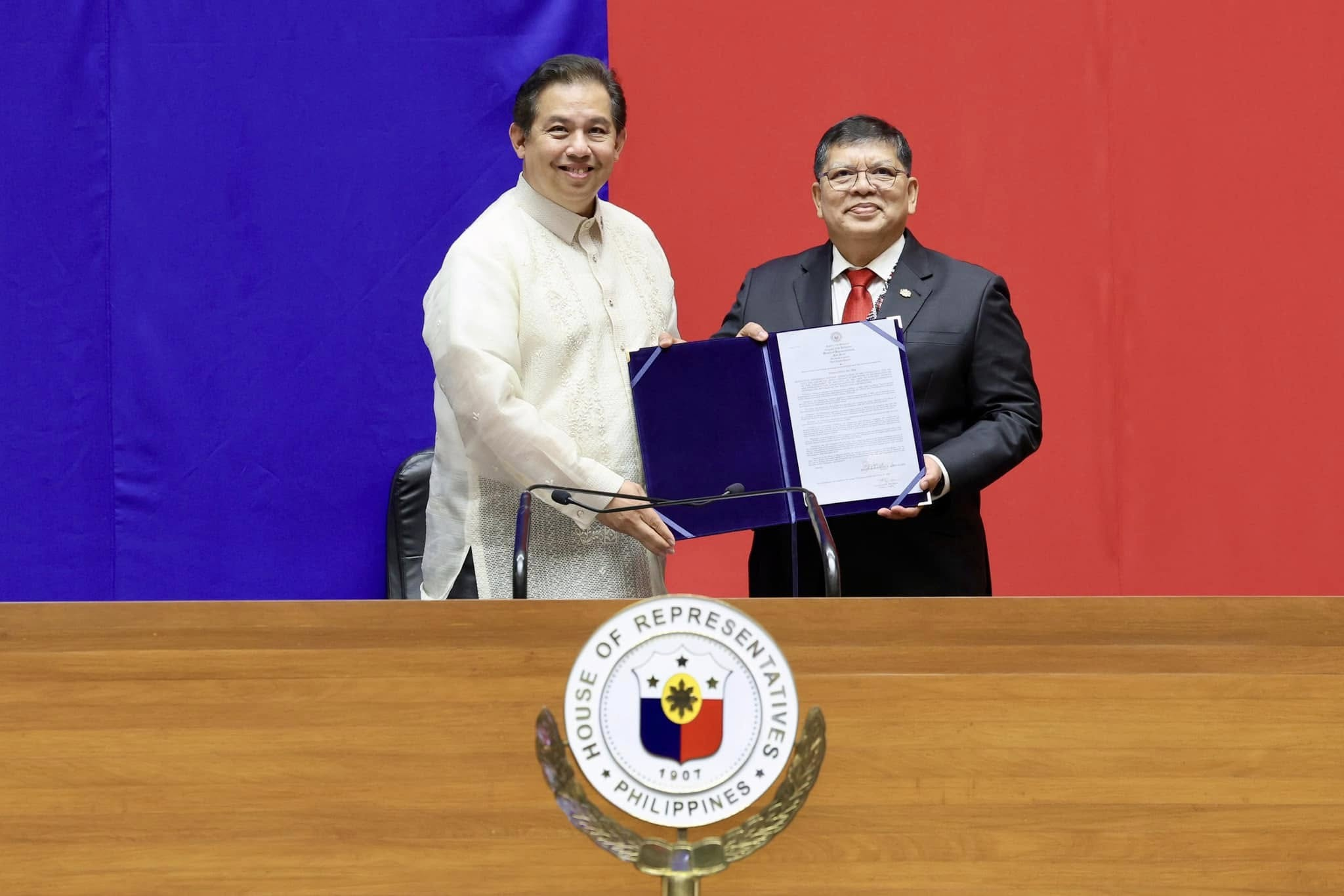
Johari (right) and Speaker of the House of Representatives of the Philippines Martin Romualdez in Manila in 2025

A week before the first session of the 15th Dewan Rakyat, he vacated his seat for Gurun in the Kedah State Legislative Assembly. This was then followed by his nomination to the position of the Speaker of the Dewan Rakyat by the Prime Minister Anwar Ibrahim. He won the vote by 147 to 74 to become the 11th Speaker of the Dewan Rakyat.

== Controversies and issues ==
=== Allegations of nepotism for Sungai Petani parliamentary seat ===
In the 2022 general election, Johari named his son, Mohammed Taufiq Johari as his successor for the Sungai Petani seat in the Malaysian Parliament. Mohammed Taufiq, who is the Head of the Kedah Angkatan Muda Keadilan (AMK), informed that he had received a letter of notification from the party to contest in the seat held by his father. Johari has been defending the Sungai Petani seat since 2008 and in GE14, he who is also a member of the Kedah State Legislative Assembly (ADUN) for Gurun got 45,532 votes, beating three other candidates with a majority of 21,569. Mohammed Taufiq has experience as a trainee doctor at Al-Ihsan Hospital Bandung and Dr Slamet Hospital in Garut, Indonesia. After returning to Malaysia, he worked at Al-Hadi Clinic in Sungai Petani. Mohammed Taufiq is a graduate of Bandung Islamic University majoring in medicine who graduated in 2020. He won the seat by defeating Robert Ling Kui Ee (PN), Shahanim Mohamad Yusoff (BN), Marzuki Yahya (GTA) and Tan Chow Kang (PRM) and got a slim majority of only 1,115 votes.

=== Allegations of nepotism for Gurun state seat ===
In the 2023 state election, Johari once again invited controversy when he named his son, Mohammed Firdaus Johari as his successor for the Gurun seat in the Kedah State Legislative Assembly. Mohammed Firdaus who is the Deputy Director of Strategy of the People's Justice Party (PKR) in Kedah insisted that he was elected based on the trust of President of PKR, Anwar Ibrahim and have to convey that trust at the lower level. Apart from Johari, who is his father, Mohammed Firdaus' brother, Mohammed Taufiq, is a Member of Parliament for Sungai Petani. Furthermore, In the meantime, Mohammaed Firdaus stressed that his experience 'behind the scenes' in the political world when he helped his father while serving as a representative in the Gurun and the Sungai Petani Parliament helped him approach voters a lot. However, Mohammed Firdaus denied the statement with the accusation of nepotism that was made to him and his father. Mohammed Firdaus will face a one-on-one competition with former Kedah football player, Baddrol Bakhtiar who is contesting on the Perikatan Nasional (PN) ticket in the seat. Baddrol managed to take the seat from the Johari family and the PKR party with a majority of 6,584 votes.

=== Comments about cassava as substitute for rice ===
Johari has urged people to look into other sources of carbohydrates, such cassava (tapioca), given the scarcity of white rice in the area. While efforts are being made to discover answers to the problem of white rice supply, he stated that it is critical to identify nutritious alternatives. Additionally, he stated that in order to improve self-sufficiency and lessen the nation's high food import bill, local governments and authorities should encourage the use of vacant land for food crop cultivation.

At the Eid al-Fitr open house held by Johari in 2024, he joked with the Prime Minister by saying that the "cassava" dish was the special dish of his open house. Also present at the open house was the Prime Minister, Anwar Ibrahim with his wife, Wan Azizah Wan Ismail, Minister in the Prime Minister's Department (Religious Affairs), Mohd Na'im Mokhtar, Deputy Inspector-General of Police, Ayob Khan Mydin Pitchay, Member of Parliament for Petaling Jaya, Wong Chen and Egyptian Ambassador to Malaysia, Ragai Tawfik Said Nasr.

== Personal life ==
Johari is married to Noraini Mohd and has 8 children, including Mohammed Taufiq Johari, a medical graduate and who has succeeded him as the member of parliament for Sungai Petani in the 2022 general election. The others are Mohammed Iqbal Johari and Mohammed Firdaus Johari, both of them are businessmen. Nurul Huda Johari, Nur Fahimah Johari and Suraya Johari, who are dentists and Muhammad Ibrahim Johari who is a medical graduate. The youngest one is Muhammad Yusuf Johari.

Johari's residence is located in Bukit Tunku, Kuala Lumpur, Malaysia.

== Election results ==
Parliament of Malaysia
Year	Constituency	Candidate	Votes	Pct	Opponent(s)	Votes	Pct	Ballots cast	Majority	Turnout
1999	P015 Sungai Petani	Johari Abdul (KeADILan)	19,742	38.25%	Mahadzir Mohd Khir (UMNO)	31,875	61.75%	55,457	12,133	76.54%
2008	P015 Sungai Petani	Johari Abdul (PKR)	33,822	58.05%	Zainuddin Maidin (UMNO)	24,441	41.95%	59,378	9,381	77.84%
2013	P015 Sungai Petani	Johari Abdul (PKR)	44,194	55.37%	Syamsul Anuar Che Mey (UMNO)	34,646	43.41%	81,024	9,548	86.96%
2013	P015 Sungai Petani	Johari Abdul (PKR)	44,194	55.37%	Ong Wei Sin (IND)	772	0.97%	81,024	9,548	86.96%
2013	P015 Sungai Petani	Johari Abdul (PKR)	44,194	55.37%	Suhaimi Hashim (KITA)	200	0.25%	81,024	9,548	86.96%
2018	P015 Sungai Petani	Johari Abdul (PKR)	45,532	49.21%	Shahanim Mohamad Yusoff (UMNO)	23,963	25.90%	93,847	21,569	83.36%
2018	P015 Sungai Petani	Johari Abdul (PKR)	45,532	49.21%	Sharir Long (PAS)	22,760	24.60%	93,847	21,569	83.36%
2018	P015 Sungai Petani	Johari Abdul (PKR)	45,532	49.21%	Sritharan Pichathu (PRM)	279	0.30%	93,847	21,569	83.36%

Kedah State Legislative Assembly
Year	Constituency	Candidate	Votes	Pct	Opponent(s)	Votes	Pct	Ballots cast	Majority	Turnout
2004	N28 Bakar Arang	Johari Abdul (PKR)	5,305	26.82%	Seng Koon Huat (MCA)	14,204	71.82%	19,778	8,899	75.13%
2018	N22 Gurun	Johari Abdul (PKR)	10,732	37.60%	Boey Chin Gan (MCA)	6,525	22.90%	23,155	4,207	81.20%
2018	N22 Gurun	Johari Abdul (PKR)	10,732	37.60%	Muzaini Azizan (PAS)	5,257	18.40%	23,155	4,207	81.20%
2018	N22 Gurun	Johari Abdul (PKR)	10,732	37.60%	Palaniappan Marimuthu (IND)	167	0.60%	23,155	4,207	81.20%

== Honours ==
=== Honours of Malaysia ===
- Malaysia
  - Commander of the Order of Loyalty to the Crown of Malaysia (PSM) – Tan Sri (2023)
  - Recipient of the 17th Yang di-Pertuan Agong Installation Medal (2024)
- Kedah
  - Knight Companion of the Order of Loyalty to the Royal House of Kedah (DSDK) – Dato' (2009)
