= Shahanim Mohamad Yusoff =

Malaysian politician and businesswomen

Yang Berbahagia Dato' Shahanim Mohamad Yusoff DSDK SDK AMK BKM BCM JP
- شاهنيم محمد يوسف
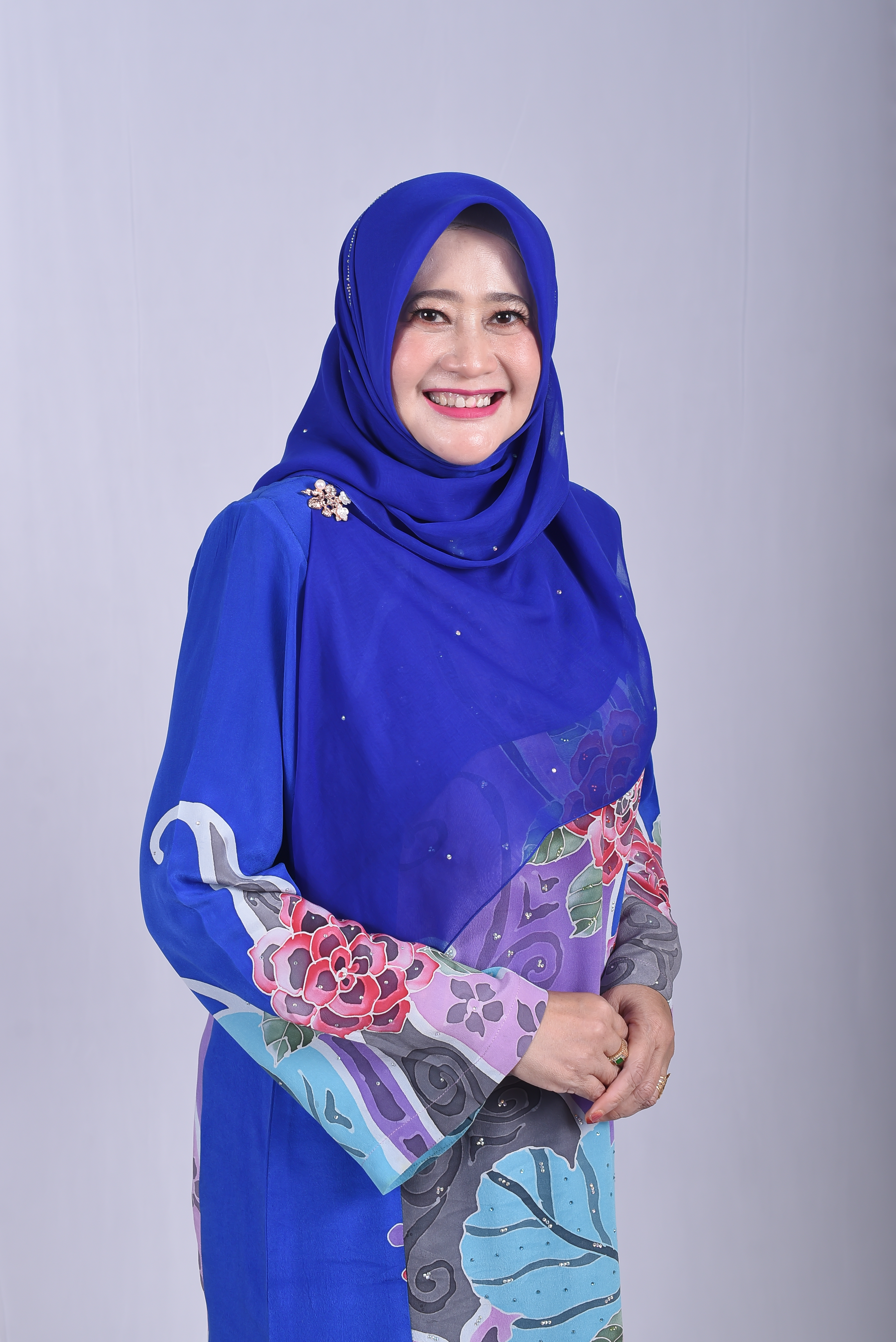

Senator Appointed by Yang di-Pertuan Agong
- In office 16 November 2017 – 28 April 2018

Senator Appointed by Kedah State Legislative Assembly
- In office 30 May 2014 – 29 May 2017

Head of UMNO Sungai Petani Division
- Incumbent
- Assumed office 1 July 2018
- Preceded by: Major (Rtd) Datuk Abdul Rahim Saad

Personal details
- Born: Shahanim binti Mohamad Yusoff; 4 January 1973 (age 53) Sungai Petani, Kedah, Malaysia
- Party: United Malay National Organisation (UMNO)
- Other political affiliations: Barisan Nasional (BN)
- Spouse: Sharizan Salleh
- Children: 4
- Education: Universiti Utara Malaysia (BBA)
- Occupation: Politician, businesswomen

Shahanim binti Mohamad Yusoff (Jawi: شاهنيم بنت محمد يوسف, born 4 January 1973) is a Malaysian politician and businesswomen who has served as the UMNO Division Chief of Sungai Petani since July 2018. She has held the position of Member of the Dewan Negara (Senator) since 30 May 2014 until 29 May 2017 and 16 November 2017 until 28 April 2018. She has also held positions as a Member of the advisory board of the Malaysian Malay Traders and Entrepreneurs Association (PERDASAMA Malaysia), Patron of Public Transport Cooperative Kuala Muda Berhad and Member of the Rubber Industry Smallholders Development Authority (RISDA).

== Early life and education ==
Shahanim binti Mohamad Yusoff was born in Sungai Petani, Kedah, Malaysia on 4 January 1973. She received her early education at SK Tuan Syed Jan Al -Jaffri, Sungai Petani, Kedah from 1980 until 1985 (grade 5), SMK Father Barres Convent, Sungai Petani, Kedah from 1986 until 1988 (SRP) and SM Teknik Alor Setar, Kedah from 1989 until 1990 (SPM). Then, she continued his studies at Universiti Utara Malaysia in 2004 until 2007. She holds a Bachelor of Business (Hons) from Universiti Utara Malaysia.

== Early career ==
She worked as a Maybank officer for 14 years and received the "Best Financial Executive for Maybank Finance in Malaysia" award in 2001. Then he was sent to Barcelona, Spain and Italy and promoted to Business Development Executive.

In 2004, she resigned as a bank officer at Maybank Finance and became an entrepreneur of a petrol station Petronas in Penang to open up opportunities to be active in political activities. Her involvement in UMNO began as the Head of the UMNO Women's Movement Sungai Petani Division from July 2001 to September 2004 and was appointed and she was appointed as the Head of Kedah UMNO Women by Menteri Besar of Kedah Syed Razak Syed Zain Barakbah from October 2004 to March 2009. She held the position until she won the position as Deputy Head of Puteri UMNO Malaysia in the Central UMNO election from 2004 to 2009.

== Political career ==
Shahanim began her political career by holding the position of Kedah State UMNO Liaison Body Committee Member (representing UMNO Girls) and Committee Member (EXCO) of the Malaysia UMNO Girls Movement from September 2004 to March 2008. She also assumed the position of Kedah State UMNO Girls Movement Leader in October 2004 until March 2009. She managed to get the position of Deputy Head of the Malaysia UMNO Puteri Movement and held it from March 2009 to September 2013.

She successfully won the position of UMNO Deputy Head of Sungai Petani Division with 389 votes, defeating his challengers Datuk Mohd Firdaus Mohd Zakaria and Mahmad Rajaee Ghazali with 389 votes and 23 votes respectively.

In May 2014, Shahanim was appointed as a Member of Dewan Negara (Senator) until November 2020.

In July 2018, she was successfully appointed as Sungai Petani Division UMNO Leader defeating the incumbent, Major (Rtd) Datuk Abdul Rahim Saad. Shahanim got 428 votes defeating Abdul Rahim who only got 246 votes.

== Personal life ==
Shahanim was married to Sharizan Salleh and they have four children.

== Election results ==
Parliament of Malaysia
Year	Constituency	Candidate	Votes	Pct	Opponent(s)	Votes	Pct	Ballots cast	Majority	Turnout
2018	P015 Sungai Petani	Shahanim Mohamad Yusoff (UMNO)	23,963	25.90%	Johari Abdul (PKR)	45,532	49.21%	93,847	21,569	83.36%
2018	P015 Sungai Petani	Shahanim Mohamad Yusoff (UMNO)	23,963	25.90%	Sharir Long (PAS)	22,760	24.60%	93,847	21,569	83.36%
2018	P015 Sungai Petani	Shahanim Mohamad Yusoff (UMNO)	23,963	25.90%	Sritharan Pichathu (PRM)	279	0.30%	93,847	21,569	83.36%
2022	P015 Sungai Petani	Shahanim Mohamad Yusoff (UMNO)	27,391	21.07%	Mohammed Taufiq Johari (PKR)	50,580	38.91%	131,447	1,115	77.85%
2022	P015 Sungai Petani	Shahanim Mohamad Yusoff (UMNO)	27,391	21.07%	Robert Ling Kui Ee (BERSATU)	49,465	38.05%	131,447	1,115	77.85%
2022	P015 Sungai Petani	Shahanim Mohamad Yusoff (UMNO)	27,391	21.07%	Marzuki Yahya (PEJUANG)	2,342	1.80%	131,447	1,115	77.85%
2022	P015 Sungai Petani	Shahanim Mohamad Yusoff (UMNO)	27,391	21.07%	Tan Chow Kang (PRM)	226	0.17%	131,447	1,115	77.85%

== Honours ==
=== Honours of Malaysia ===
- Kedah
  - Knight Companion of the Order of Loyalty to the Royal House of Kedah (DSDK) – Dato' (2017)
  - Companion of the Order of Loyalty to the Royal House of Kedah (SDK) (2014)
  - Member of the Order of the Crown of Kedah (AMK) (2005)
  - Justice of the Peace of Kedah (JP) (2008)
  - Recipient of the Public Service Star (BKM) (2004)
- Malacca
  - Recipient of the Distinguished Service Star (BCM) (2007)
