= Shuaib Lazim =

Malaysian politician

Yang Berbahagia Datuk Shuaib Lazim PJN
- شوعاءيب لازيم
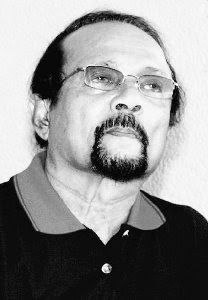

Senator Appointed by the Yang di-Pertuan Agong
- In office 5 April 1985 – 10 July 1991
- Prime Minister: Mahathir Mohamad

Member of the Kedah State Legislative Assembly for Pantai Merdeka
- In office 24 March 1990 – 4 October 1990
- Preceded by: Ghazali Bakar
- Succeeded by: Jamaludin Yusof
- Majority: 3,409 (1990)

Personal details
- Born: Shuaib bin Lazim; 22 December 1938 Tikam Batu, Sungai Petani, Kedah, Federation of Malaya (now Malaysia)
- Died: 11 November 2023 (aged 84) Merbok, Kuala Muda, Kedah, Malaysia
- Resting place: Merbok Muslim Cemetery, Kuala Muda, Kedah, Malaysia
- Party: United Malays National Organisation (UMNO)
- Other political affiliations: Barisan Nasional (BN)
- Relations: Abdul Lazim (brother); Johari Abdul (nephew); Mohammed Taufiq Johari (great-nephew); Shafie Apdal (son-in-law)
- Children: 6 (including Shuryani)
- Occupation: Businessman
- Profession: Teacher
- Nickname: Shubila (Note: Abbreviation from his full name, Shuaib bin Lazim)

Shuaib bin Haji Lazim (Jawi: شوعاءيب بن لازيم: 22 December 1938 – 11 November 2023), sometimes misspelled as Shuib bin Lazim, was a Malaysian politician, businessman and teacher who served as the Senator in the Malaysian parliament from April 1988 to July 1991. He was also a Member of the Kedah State Legislative Assembly (MLA) for Pantai Merdeka from March 1990 to October 1990 and held the position of Treasurer of Perkasa.

Shuaib was Head of UMNO for Sungai Petani Division, Deputy Chairman of Actacorp Holdings Bhd and Chairman of Hatten Group Sdn Bhd. He was also close to the former Finance Minister, Daim Zainuddin.

== Early life and career ==
Shuaib bin Lazim was born in Tikam Batu, Sungai Petani, Kedah, Federation of Malaya.

Shuaib once became a teacher in Kedah in 1957 after receiving teaching training at the Kedah Teachers College. For his excellence, he was promoted to Principal in 1970. In 1978, he was involved in business mainly as a housing developer and became the chairman of 9 private companies. He was appointed as a Senator in the Dewan Negara in 1990.

== Involvement in politics ==
Shuaib was a former senator appointed by Yang di-Pertuan Agong for two terms. His comrades from Kedah (1988) were Zakaria Said (Kuala Kedah), Mahmud Mat Zain (Padang Serai), Ismail Abdullah (Jerai), Osman Abdul (Pendang) and Khalid Abdullah (Alor Setar).

== 1990 Pantai Merdeka by-election ==
Shuaib defeated the PAS candidate, Muhamed Muslim Othman in the Kedah State Legislative Assembly Pantai Merdeka on 24 March 1990. On 21 February 1990, the Kuala Lumpur High Court once declared him bankrupt but strangely he was still able to contest in the 1990 Pantai Merdeka by-election. PAS and DAP insisted that the SPR withdraw the nomination of Shuaib because before the nomination of another candidate he had been declared bankrupt. The defense lawyer considered that the court's order was null and void. Judge VC George urged Shuaib Lazim's lawyer to provide evidence that the debt has been finalized or has been settled. If Shuaib is declared bankrupt, then the PAS candidate can be declared the winner without contesting.

In the by-election, the DAP party has also campaigned to support the PAS candidate. The previous election in 1986, UMNO and Barisan Nasional won with a large majority of 5,166 votes because this area is an UMNO stronghold. Former Prime Minister of Malaysia, Tunku Abdul Rahman also campaigned to support PAS candidates and stood on the PAS stage. The election was held following the death of BN assemblyman, Ghazali Abu Bakar who won in the 1986 Malaysian general election.

BN won with a majority of 5,166 in 1986. In this by-election the majority was reduced to 3,409. The lower turnout (72.69% in 1986 and 68.12% in the by-election) and the bankruptcy issue were the main reasons for the low majority. In fact, the issue of bankruptcy is the only major issue that has been fully exploited by PAS. On the other hand, BN's lack of majority is considered a success for PAS. The result of the by-election is also a sign that the combination of PAS and Semangat 46 (S46) is accepted by PAS members and supporters.

His case is always a reference for lawyers regarding the status of a person who has been declared bankrupt. After a year Malaysian Prime Minister, Mahathir Mohamad ordered to appoint someone else.

== Involvement in PERKASA ==
PERKASA president, Ibrahim Ali was once reported as saying that Shuaib had informed him of his intention to step down as treasurer on 10 April 2011 due to his poor health condition and was replaced by Marzuki Ibrahim.

== Controversy ==
=== Anwar Ibrahim sex video ===
Shuaib was alleged to be one of the masterminds named "Datuk T" together with Rahim Thamby Chik and Shazryl Eskay Abdullah but was denied by his nephew who revealed video evidence in the alleged sex video issue of Anwar Ibrahim.

== Personal life ==
Shuaib was married and had six children. He was the father-in-law of Mohd Shafie Apdal, former Minister of Rural and Regional Development of Malaysia and former Chief Minister of Sabah from 2018 to 2020 and also the uncle of Johari Abdul, 11th Speaker of the Dewan Rakyat and former Member of Parliament for Sungai Petani.

== Election result ==
Kedah State Legislative Assembly
Year	Constituency	Candidate	Votes	Pct	Opponent(s)	Votes	Pct	Ballots cast	Majority	Turnout
1990	N23 Pantai Merdeka	Shuaib Lazim (UMNO)	10,384	N/A	Muhamed Muslim Othman (PAS)	6,975	N/A	N/A	3,409	68.12%

== Honours ==
=== Honours of Malaysia ===
- Malaysia
  - Commander of the Order of Meritorious Service (PJN) – Datuk (2001)
