= Boey Chin Gan =

Malaysian politician

Yang Berbahagia Dato' Boey Chin Gan DSDK AMK JP BKM
- 梅振仁

Member of the Kedah State Legislative Assembly for Kulim
- In office 21 March 2004 – 8 March 2008
- Preceded by: Yong Pau Chak (BN–MCA)
- Succeeded by: Lim Soo Nee (PR–PKR)
- Majority: 7,365 (2004)

Personal details
- Born: 8 November 1965 (age 60) Alor Setar, Kedah, Malaysia
- Party: Malaysian Chinese Association (MCA)
- Other political affiliations: Barisan Nasional (BN)

Boey Chin Gan (Chinese: 梅振仁; born 8 November 1965) is a Malaysian politician who served as Member of the Kedah State Legislative Assembly for Kulim from March 2004 to March 2008. He is a member of Malaysian Chinese Association (MCA), a component party of Barisan Nasional (BN) coalitions.

== Early life and education ==
Boey Chin Gan was born on 8 November 1965 in Alor Setar, Kedah. He obtain a bachelor's degree of Politics (Honours) from Universiti Kebangsaan Malaysia (UKM) in 1992.

== Political career ==
His political career start at when he served as Relations Secretary of the MCA Youth at MCA Headquarters in 1992 to 1993. He later went on served as Press Secretary of the Minister of Housing and Local Government, Ting Chew Peh from 1993 to 1999 and Ong Ka Ting from 1999 to 2004. He held this post about 11 years from 1993 to 2004.

In 2004 general election, Boey Chin Gan selected for contest Kulim state seat and replace 5 terms state assemblyman, Yong Pau Chak. He eventually elected as Kulim state assemblyman with majority of 7,365 votes. In 2008 general election, he went on contest Padang Serai parliamentary seat, however he was defeated by Gobalakrishnan Nagapan from PKR with majority of 11,738 votes. Boey didn't contest in 2013 general election. In party level, he was elected as deputy director of Political Education Bureau. In 2018 general election, he attempt made a comeback by contest in Gurun state seat, but was defeated by Johari Abdul from PKR with majority of 4,207 votes.

== Election results ==
Kedah State Legislative Assembly
Year	Constituency	Candidate	Votes	Pct	Opponent(s)	Votes	Pct	Ballots cast	Majority	Turnout
2004	N35 Kulim	Boey Chin Gan (MCA)	13,497	68.76%	Tang Fuie Wah (PKR)	6,132	31.24%	20,778	7,365	76.54%
2018	N22 Gurun	Boey Chin Gan (MCA)	6,525	22.90%	Johari Abdul (PKR)	10,732	37.60%	23,155	4,207	81.20%
2018	N22 Gurun	Boey Chin Gan (MCA)	6,525	22.90%	Muzaini Azizan (PAS)	5,257	18.40%	23,155	4,207	81.20%
2018	N22 Gurun	Boey Chin Gan (MCA)	6,525	22.90%	Palaniappan Marimuthu (IND)	167	0.60%	23,155	4,207	81.20%

Parliament of Malaysia
Year	Constituency	Candidate	Votes	Pct	Opponent(s)	Votes	Pct	Ballots cast	Majority	Turnout
2008	P017 Padang Serai	Boey Chin Gan (MCA)	17,036	37.19%	Gobalakrishnan Nagapan (PKR)	28,774	62.81%	47,124	11,738	79.58%

== Honours ==
- Kedah
  - Knight Companion of Order of Loyalty to the Royal House of Kedah (DSDK) – Dato' (2008)
  - Member of the Order of the Crown of Kedah (AMK)
  - Justice of the Peace (JP) (2004)
  - Recipient of the Public Service Star (BKM)
