= Wong Chia Zhen =

Malaysian politician

Yang Berhormat Tuan Wong Chia Zhen SSS MLA
- 黄佳祯

Member of the Kedah State Executive Council
- Incumbent
- Assumed office 21 August 2023
- Monarch: Sallehuddin
- Menteri Besar: Muhammad Sanusi Md Nor
- Portfolio: Human Resources, Chinese, Indian and Siamese Affairs & Non-Governmental Organisations
- Preceded by: Wan Romani Wan Salim (Human Resources); Robert Ling Kui Ee (Chinese and Siamese Affairs); Azman Nasrudin (Indian Affairs); Portfolio established (Non-governmental Organisations)
- Constituency: Kulim

Member of the Kedah State Legislative Assembly for Kulim
- Incumbent
- Assumed office 12 August 2023
- Preceded by: Yeo Keng Chuan (PH–PKR)
- Majority: 7,742 (2023)

Secretary-General of Parti Gerakan Rakyat Malaysia
- Incumbent
- Assumed office 24 January 2025
- Deputy: Wendy Subramaniam
- Preceded by: Loh Kah Yong

Youth Chief of Parti Gerakan Rakyat Malaysia
- Incumbent
- Assumed office 15 July 2023
- Deputy: Lee Boon Shian
- Preceded by: Ooi Zhi Yi

Personal details
- Born: Wong Chia Zhen; 1985 (age 40–41)
- Citizenship: Malaysia
- Party: Parti Gerakan Rakyat Malaysia (GERAKAN)
- Other political affiliations: Perikatan Nasional (PN)
- Education: Universiti Utara Malaysia
- Occupation: Politician

Wong Chia Zhen

Chinese name
- Traditional Chinese: 黃佳禎
- Simplified Chinese: 黄佳祯
Transcriptions
Standard Mandarin
- Hanyu Pinyin: Huáng Jiāzhēn

Wong Chia Zhen (simplified Chinese: 黄佳祯; traditional Chinese: 黃佳禎; pinyin: Huáng Jiāzhēn) is a Malaysian politician who has served as Member of the Kedah State Executive Council (EXCO) in the Perikatan Nasional (PN) state administration under Menteri Besar Muhammad Sanusi Md Nor and Member of the Kedah State Legislative Assembly (MLA) for Kulim since August 2023. He is a member, Youth Chief, Secretary-General and State Chairman of Kedah of the Parti Gerakan Rakyat Malaysia (GERAKAN), a component party of the PN coalition. He is also presently the only Chinese, non-Malay and GERAKAN Kedah EXCO Member and the only serving GERAKAN elected representative as well as the first GERAKAN candidate to win an election since Mah Siew Keong won the 2014 Telok Intan by-election.

== Political career ==
=== Candidate for the Member of Parliament (2022) ===
==== 2022 general election ====
In the 2022 general election, Wong made his electoral debut after being nominated by PN to contest for the Batu Kawan federal seat. He was not elected to Parliament as the Batu Kawan MP after losing to Chief Minister of Penang Chow Kon Yeow of Pakatan Harapan (PH) by a majority of 40,400 votes.

=== Member of the Kedah State Legislative Assembly (2023–present) ===
==== 2023 Kedah state election ====
In the 2023 Kedah state election, Wong was renominated by PN to contest for the Kulim state seat. Wong won the seat and was elected to the Kedah State Legislative Assembly as the Kulim MLA after defeating Teh Lean Ong of PH by a majority of 7,742 votes.

=== Member of the Kedah State Executive Council (2023–present) ===
In the 2023 Kedah state election, the ruling PN won a two-thirds supermajority in the Kedah State Legislative Assembly and was reelected to power. Following that, Jeneri MLA Muhammad Sanusi of PN was reappointed as the Menteri Besar. Wong was appointed as the Kedah EXCO Member in charge of Human Resources, Chinese, Indian and Siamese Affairs and Non-governmental Organisations (NGOs) by Menteri Besar Muhammad Sanusi on 21 August 2023.

== Election results ==
Parliament of Malaysia
| Year | Constituency | Candidate | Votes | Pct | Opponent(s) | Votes | Pct | Ballots cast | Majority | Turnout |
|---|---|---|---|---|---|---|---|---|---|---|
| 2022 | P046 Batu Kawan | Wong Chia Zhen (Gerakan) | 10,344 | 15.03% | Chow Kon Yeow (DAP) | 50,744 | 73.72% | 88,812 | 40,400 | 77.50% |
| 2022 | P046 Batu Kawan | Wong Chia Zhen (Gerakan) | 10,344 | 15.03% | Tan Lee Huat (MCA) | 7,145 | 10.38% | 88,812 | 40,400 | 77.50% |
| 2022 | P046 Batu Kawan | Wong Chia Zhen (Gerakan) | 10,344 | 15.03% | Ong Chin Wen (WARISAN) | 450 | 0.65% | 88,812 | 40,400 | 77.50% |
| 2022 | P046 Batu Kawan | Wong Chia Zhen (Gerakan) | 10,344 | 15.03% | Lee Ah Liang (PRM) | 148 | 0.22% | 88,812 | 40,400 | 77.50% |

Kedah State Legislative Assembly
| Year | Constituency | Candidate | Votes | Pct | Opponent(s) | Votes | Pct | Ballots cast | Majority | Turnout |
|---|---|---|---|---|---|---|---|---|---|---|
| 2023 | N35 Kulim | Wong Chia Zhen (Gerakan) | 23,278 | 59.97% | Teh Lean Ong (PKR) | 15,536 | 40.03% | 38,814 | 7,742 | 71.65% |

== Honours ==
- Kedah
  - Companion of the Order of Loyalty to Sultan Sallehuddin of Kedah (SSS) (2025)
