= Zamri Yusuf =

Malaysian politician and civil engineer

Yang Berbahagia Dato' Zamri Yusuf DSSS SMK JP
- زمري يوسف

State Leader of the Opposition of Kedah
- In office 12 March 2023 – 12 August 2023
- Monarch: Sallehuddin
- Menteri Besar: Muhammad Sanusi Md Nor
- Preceded by: Johari Abdul
- Succeeded by: Bau Wong Bau Ek
- Constituency: Suka Menanti

Member of the Kedah State Executive Council
- In office 1 August 2018 – 17 May 2020
- Monarch: Sallehuddin
- Menteri Besar: Mukhriz Mahathir
- Portfolio: Public Works, Water Supply, Water Resources and Energy
- Preceded by: Himself
- Succeeded by: Suraya Yaacob
- Constituency: Suka Menanti
- In office 22 May 2018 – 1 August 2018
- Monarch: Sallehuddin
- Menteri Besar: Mukhriz Mahathir
- Portfolio: Science, Innovation, Information Technology, Public Works, Water Supply, Water Resources and Energy
- Preceded by: Norsabrina Mohd Noor (Science, Innovation and Information Technology); Badrol Hisham Hashim (Water Supply, Water Resources and Energy)
- Succeeded by: Ooi Tze Min (Science and Technology, Climate Change); Himself (Public Works, Water Supply, Water Resources and Energy)
- Constituency: Suka Menanti

Member of the Kedah State Legislative Assembly for Suka Menanti
- In office 9 May 2018 – 12 August 2023
- Preceded by: Position established
- Succeeded by: Dzowahir Ab Ghani (PN–BERSATU)
- Majority: 6,251 (2018)

Senator Elected by the Kedah State Legislative Assembly
- In office 26 May 2008 – 25 May 2011 Serving with Muhamad Yusof Husin
- Monarch: Mizan Zainal Abidin
- Prime Minister: Abdullah Ahmad Badawi (2008–2009); Najib Razak (2009–2011)
- Preceded by: Chua Kim Chuan & Yaakob Mohammad
- Succeeded by: Saiful Izham Ramli

Personal details
- Born: Zamri bin Yusuf Kedah, Malaysia
- Citizenship: Malaysian
- Party: People's Justice Party (PKR)
- Other political affiliations: Pakatan Rakyat (PR) (2008–2015); Pakatan Harapan (PH) (since 2015)
- Children: 8
- Education: Marquette University (B.Sc. in Civil Engineering)
- Occupation: Politician
- Profession: Civil Engineer

Zamri bin Yusuf is a Malaysian politician and civil engineer who served as State Leader of the Opposition of Kedah from March to August 2023 and Member of the Kedah State Legislative Assembly (MLA) for Suka Menanti from May 2018 to August 2023 respectively, Member of the Kedah State Executive Council (EXCO) in the Pakatan Harapan (PH) state administration under former Menteri Besar Mukhriz Mahathir from May 2018 to the collapse of the PH administration in May 2020 as well as a Senator from May 2008 to May 2011. He is a member of the People's Justice Party (PKR), a component party of the PH coalition.

== Election results ==
Parliament of Malaysia
Year	Constituency	Candidate	Votes	Pct	Opponent(s)	Votes	Pct	Ballots cast	Majority	Turnout
2004	P015 Sungai Petani	Zamri Yusuf (PKR)	18,565	33.98%	Mahadzir Mohd Khir (UMNO)	36,067	66.02%	55,639	17,502	78.45%

Kedah State Legislative Assembly
Year	Constituency	Candidate	Votes	Pct	Opponent(s)	Votes	Pct	Ballots cast	Majority	Turnout
2008	N08 Pedu	Zamri Yusuf (PKR)	6,047	40.78%	Mahdzir Khalid (UMNO)	8,780	59.22%	15,200	2,733	87.53%
2013	N08 Pedu	Zamri Yusuf (PKR)	7,562	41.82%	Kama Noriah Ibrahim (UMNO)	10,522	58.18%	18,460	2,960	91.10%
2018	N12 Suka Menanti	Zamri Yusuf (PKR)	13,301	53.35%	Ahmad Bashah Md Hanipah (UMNO)	7,050	28.28%	25,371	6,251	81.00%
2018	N12 Suka Menanti	Zamri Yusuf (PKR)	13,301	53.35%	Mohd Sabri Omar (PAS)	4,580	18.37%	25,371	6,251	81.00%
2023	N12 Suka Menanti	Zamri Yusuf (PKR)	10,151	35.56%	Dzowahir Ab Ghani (BERSATU)	18,396	64.44%	28,702	8,245	68.04%

== Honours ==
- Kedah
  - Knight Companion of the Order of Loyalty to Sultan Sallehuddin of Kedah (DSSS) – Dato' (2019)
  - Companion of the Order of the Crown of Kedah (SMK) (2009)
  - Justice of the Peace of Kedah (JP) (2011)
