= Dzowahir Ab Ghani =

Malaysian politician

Yang Berhormat Tuan Dzowahir Ab Ghani SSS MLA
- ظواهر أب غني

Member of the Kedah State Executive Council
- Incumbent
- Assumed office 21 August 2023
- Monarch: Sallehuddin
- Menteri Besar: Muhammad Sanusi Md Nor
- Portfolio: Agriculture, Plantation and Transport
- Preceded by: Azman Nasruddin (Agriculture & Transport); Portfolio established (Plantation)
- Constituency: Suka Menanti

Member of the Kedah State Legislative Assembly for Suka Menanti
- Incumbent
- Assumed office 12 August 2023
- Preceded by: Zamri Yusuf (PH–PKR)
- Majority: 8,245 (2023)

Personal details
- Born: Dzowahir bin Ab Ghani Malaysia
- Party: Malaysian United Indigenous Party (BERSATU) (–2026); National Vision Party (Malaysia) (WAWASAN) (since 2026)
- Other political affiliations: Perikatan Nasional (PN) (2023-)
- Occupation: Politician

Dzowahir bin Ab Ghani is a Malaysian politician who has served as Member of the Kedah State Executive Council (EXCO) in the Perikatan Nasional (PN) state administration under Menteri Besar Muhammad Sanusi Md Nor and Member of the Kedah State Legislative Assembly (MLA) for Suka Menanti since August 2023. He is a member of the Malaysian United Indigenous Party (BERSATU), a component party of the PN coalition.

== Election results ==
Kedah State Legislative Assembly
Year	Constituency	Candidate	Votes	Pct	Opponent(s)	Votes	Pct	Ballots cast	Majority	Turnout
2023	N12 Suka Menanti	Dzowahir Ab Ghani (BERSATU)	18,396	64.44%	Zamri Yusuf (PKR)	10,151	35.56%	28,702	8,245	68.04%

== Honours ==
- Kedah
  - Companion of the Order of Loyalty to Sultan Sallehuddin of Kedah (SSS) (2025)
