= Yeo Keng Chuan =

Malaysian politician

- 杨庆传

Member of the Kedah State Legislative Assembly for Kulim
- In office 9 May 2018 – 12 August 2023
- Preceded by: Chua Thiong Gee (BN–MCA)
- Succeeded by: Wong Chia Zhen (PN–Gerakan)
- Majority: 3,795 (2018)

Personal details
- Party: People's Justice Party (PKR)
- Other political affiliations: Pakatan Harapan (PH)
- Occupation: Politician

Yeo Keng Chuan is a Malaysian politician who served as Member of the Kedah State Legislative Assembly (MLA) for Kulim from May 2018 to August 2023. He is a member of People's Justice Party (PKR), a component party of Pakatan Harapan (PH) coalition.

== Election results ==
Kedah State Legislative Assembly
Year	Constituency	Candidate	Votes	Pct	Opponent(s)	Votes	Pct	Ballots cast	Majority	Turnout
2018	N35 Kulim	Yeo Keng Chuan (PKR)	13,070	41.55%	Chua Thiong Gee (MCA)	9,275	29.48%	31,459	3,795	81.60%
2018	N35 Kulim	Yeo Keng Chuan (PKR)	13,070	41.55%	Mohd Khairi Mohd Salleh (PAS)	9,080	28.86%	31,459	3,795	81.60%
2018	N35 Kulim	Yeo Keng Chuan (PKR)	13,070	41.55%	Lee Ah Leong (PRM)	34	0.11%	31,459	3,795	81.60%
