= Suka Menanti =

Suka Menanti (N12)
Kedah constituency

State constituency
- Legislature: Kedah State Legislative Assembly
MLA
Dzowahir Ab Ghani
PN
- Constituency created: 2018
- First contested: 2018
- Last contested: 2023

Demographics
- Population (2020): 56,156
- Electors (2023): 41,957

Suka Menanti is a state constituency in Kedah, Malaysia, that has been represented in the Kedah State Legislative Assembly.

== Demographics ==
As of 2020, N.12 Suka Menanti has a population of 56,156 people.

Ethnic breakdown of Suka Menanti's electorate as of 2023
1. Malay (72.2%)
2. Chinese (23.2%)
3. Indian (4.00%)
4. Other ethnicities (0.60%)

== History ==
=== Polling districts ===
According to the gazette issued on 30 March 2018, the Suka Menanti constituency has a total of 15 polling districts.

State constituency	Polling districts	Code	Location
Suka Menanti (N12）	Taman Malaysia	009/12/01	SK Seri Amar Diraja
Suka Menanti (N12）	Taman Golf	009/12/02	Jabatan Kebudayaan Dan Kesenian Negara Kedah
Suka Menanti (N12）	Taman Uda	009/12/03	SK Taman Uda
Suka Menanti (N12）	Jalan Sultanah	009/12/04	SMK Sultanah Bahiyah
Suka Menanti (N12）	Alor Semadom	009/12/05	SK Hj Mohd Shariff
Suka Menanti (N12）	Seberang Pumpong	009/12/06	SJK (C) Pumpong
Suka Menanti (N12）	Suka Menanti	009/12/07	SK Suka Menanti
Suka Menanti (N12）	Taman Wira	009/12/08	SMK Mergong
Suka Menanti (N12）	Gunong Sali	009/12/09	SK Seri Perdana
Suka Menanti (N12）	Kampung Berjaya	009/12/10	SJK (C) Long Chuan
Suka Menanti (N12）	Telok Yan	009/12/11	SJK (C) Long Chuan
Suka Menanti (N12）	Kampung Seberang Terus	009/12/12	SMK Tuanku Abdul Rahman
Suka Menanti (N12）	Taman Rakyat Mergong	009/12/13	SMK Tuanku Abdul Rahman
Suka Menanti (N12）	Kampung Batin	009/12/14	SK Mergong
Suka Menanti (N12）	Alor Merah	009/12/15	SMK Alor Merah

=== Representation history ===
Members of the Legislative Assembly for Suka Menanti
Assembly	No	Years	Member	Party
Constituency created from Bakar Bata, Anak Bukit and Bukit Pinang
14th	N12	2018–2023	Zamri Yusuf	PH (PKR)
15th	N12	2023–2026	Dzowahir Ab Ghani	PN (BERSATU)
15th	N12	2026–present	Dzowahir Ab Ghani	PN (WAWASAN)

== Election results ==
Kedah state election, 2023: Suka Menanti
Party	Candidate	Votes	%	∆%
PN	Dzowahir Ab Ghani	18,396	64.44	▲64.44
PH	Zamri Yusuf	10,151	35.56	▲35.56
Total valid votes		28,547	100.00	
Total rejected ballots		155		
Unreturned ballots		53		
Turnout		28,755	68.53	
Registered electors		41,957		
Majority		8,245		
PN gain from PKR		Swing		?

Kedah state election, 2018: Suka Menanti
Party	Candidate	Votes	%
PKR	Zamri Yusuf	13,301	53.35
BN	Ahmad Bashah Md Hanipah	7,050	28.28
PAS	Mohd Sabri Omar	4,580	18.37
Total valid votes		24,931	100.00
Total rejected ballots		303	
Unreturned ballots		137	
Turnout		25,371	81.04
Registered electors		31,305	
Majority		6,251	25.07
This was a new constituency created.
