= Leong Yong Kong =

Malaysian politician

Yang Berbahagia Dato' Leong Yong Kong DSDK BKM
- 梁荣光

Member of the Kedah State Executive Council
- In office 22 February 2016 – 10 May 2018 (Environment, Chinese, Indian and Siamese Community Affairs, Heath and Unity)
- Monarch: Sultan Abdul Halim
- Menteri Besar: Ahmad Bashah Md Hanipah (2016–2018)
- Preceded by: Himself (Environment, Chinese, Indian Community Affairs, Heath and Unity); Mohd Rawi Abdul Hamid (Siamese Community Affairs)
- Succeeded by: Ooi Tze Min (Environment, Chinese Community Affairs and Siamese Community Affairs); Ismail Salleh (Health); Summugam Rengasamy (Indian Community Affairs and Unity)
- In office 2015 – 22 February 2016 (Environment, Chinese and Indian Community Affairs, Heath and Unity)
- Monarch: Sultan Abdul Halim
- Menteri Besar: Mukhriz Mahathir (2013–2016)
- Preceded by: Himself (Environment, Chinese, Indian Community Affairs, Heath and Unity)
- Succeeded by: Himself (Environment, Chinese, Indian Community Affairs, Heath and Unity)
- In office 20 March 2014 – 2015 (Environment, Chinese Community Affairs, Heath and Unity)
- Monarch: Sultan Abdul Halim
- Menteri Besar: Mukhriz Mahathir (2013–2016)
- Preceded by: Tan Chow Kang (Environment, Chinese Community Affairs)
- Succeeded by: Himself (Environment, Chinese, Indian Community Affairs, Heath and Unity)

Member of the Kedah State Legislative Assembly for Gurun
- In office 8 March 2008 – 9 May 2018
- Preceded by: Beh Heng Seong (BN–MCA)
- Succeeded by: Johari Abdul (PH–PKR)
- Majority: 1,554 (2008); 1,296 (2013)

Personal details
- Born: 26 May 1960 (age 66) Gurun, Kedah, Federation of Malaya (now Malaysia)
- Party: Malaysian Chinese Association (MCA)
- Other political affiliations: Barisan Nasional (BN)
- Education: University of Agra (MBBS)
- Occupation: Politician, Doctor

Leong Yong Kong is a Malaysian politician who served as Member of the Kedah State Legislative Assembly (MLA) for Gurun from March 2008 to May 2018 and Member of the Kedah State Executive Council (EXCO) in the Barisan Nasional (BN) administration under Menteri Besar Mukhriz Mahathir and Ahmad Bashah Md Hanipah from 2014 to 2016. He is a member of the Malaysian Chinese Association (MCA), a component party of the Barisan Nasional coalition.

== Education ==
Leong Yong Kong holds a Bachelor of Medicine and Bachelor of Surgery from the University of Agra.

== Political career ==
Leong Yong Kong ran in the 2008 state election and the 2013 state election. He was elected as the Gurun state assembly member.

On 20 March 2014, he was sworn in as Kedah State Executive Councilor, in charge of Environment, Chinese Community Affairs, Heath and Unity portfolio. On 11 May 2015, he was added to be in charge of Indian Community Affairs, which was originally the responsibility of Mohd Rawi Abdul Hamid. On 22 February 2016, he was added to be in charge of Siamese affairs, which was originally the responsibility of Mohd Rawi Abdul Hamid.

On 27 May 2016, Leong Yong Kong withdrew from the MCA because of its concerns about Islamic criminal law. On May 28, the then MCA Kedah state chairman Lee Chee Leong gave Leong Yong Kong two weeks to reconsider his decision to quit the party. On 1 June, Leong Yong Kong withdrew his decision to withdraw from the MCA.

== Election results ==
Kedah State Legislative Assembly
Year	Constituency	Candidate	Votes	Pct	Opponent(s)	Votes	Pct	Ballots cast	Majority	Turnout
2008	N22 Gurun	Leong Yong Kong (MCA)	8,589	54.97%	Kalai Vanan Bala Sundram (PKR)	7,035	45.03%	16,464	1,554	73.70%
2013	N22 Gurun	Leong Yong Kong (MCA)	11,411	53.01%	Salma Ismail (PKR)	10,115	46.99%	22,077	1,296	84.80%

Parliament of Malaysia
Year	Constituency	Candidate	Votes	Pct	Opponent(s)	Votes	Pct	Ballots cast	Majority	Turnout
2018	P017 Padang Serai	Leong Yong Kong (MCA)	15,449	22.04%	Karupaiya Mutusami (PKR)	31,724	45.27%	71,157	8,813	83.88%
2018	P017 Padang Serai	Leong Yong Kong (MCA)	15,449	22.04%	Muhammad Sobri Osman (PAS)	22,911	32.69%	71,157	8,813	83.88%

== Honours ==
- Kedah
  - Knight Companion of the Order of Loyalty to the Royal House of Kedah (DSDK) – Dato' (2014)
  - Recipient of the Public Service Star (BKM) (2002)
