= Kulim (state constituency) =

Malaysian state constituency

Kulim (N35)
Kedah constituency

State constituency
- Legislature: Kedah State Legislative Assembly
MLA
Wong Chia Zhen
PN
- Constituency created: 1959
- First contested: 1959
- Last contested: 2023

Demographics
- Electors (2023): 54,169

Kulim is a state constituency in Kedah, Malaysia, that has been represented in the Kedah State Legislative Assembly. It has been represented by Member of the State Executive Council (EXCO) Wong Chia Zhen of Perikatan Nasional (PN) since 2023.

== Demographics ==
As of 2020, Kulim has a population of 75,798 people.

Ethnic breakdown of Kulim's electorate as of 2023
1. Malay (63.4%)
2. Chinese (19.4%)
3. Indian (16.5%)
4. Other ethnicities (0.70%)

== History ==
=== Polling districts ===
According to the gazette issued on 30 March 2018, the Kulim constituency has a total of 23 polling districts.

State constituency	Polling districts	Code	Location
Kulim (N35）	Kampung Tebuan	018/35/01	SK Seri Lindungan Raja
Kulim (N35）	Ulu Mahang	018/35/02	SMK Mahang
Kulim (N35）	Pekan Mahang	018/35/03	SK Mahang
Kulim (N35）	Ladang Sungai Dingin	018/35/04	SK Ladang Dublin
Kulim (N35）	FELDA Gunong Bongsu	018/35/05	SK Gunung Bongsu
Kulim (N35）	Karangan	018/35/06	SJK (C) Khai Min
Kulim (N35）	Terap	018/35/07	SK Terap
Kulim (N35）	Ladang Sungai Ular	018/35/08	SJK (T) Ladang Sungai Ular
Kulim (N35）	Ladang Anak Kulim	018/35/09	SJK (T) Ladang Anak Kulim
Kulim (N35）	Jalan Tunku Bendahara	018/35/10	SJK (C) Chong Cheng
Kulim (N35）	Taman Kenari	018/35/11	SK Taman Kenari
Kulim (N35）	Taman Tunku Putra	018/35/12	Dewan Bandaran Kulim
Kulim (N35）	Taman Seri Kulim	018/35/13	SK Kulim
Kulim (N35）	Pekan Kulim	018/35/14	SMA Tarbiyyah Diniah
Kulim (N35）	Jalan Tunku Putra	018/35/15	SMK St. Patrick
Kulim (N35）	Jalan Ibrahim	018/35/16	SMJK Chio Min
Kulim (N35）	Bukit Awi	018/35/17	SK Sri Kulim
Kulim (N35）	Taman Bersatu	018/35/18	SK Taman Jelutong
Kulim (N35）	Ayer Merah	018/35/19	Kolej MARA Kulim
Kulim (N35）	Taman Anggerik	018/35/20	Kolej Vokasional Kulim
Kulim (N35）	Junjong	018/35/21	SK Junjong
Kulim (N35）	Padang Penyangga	018/35/22	SJK (C) Sin Min
Kulim (N35）	Durian Burong	018/35/23	SJK (T) Ladang Somee

=== Representation history ===
Members of the Legislative Assembly for Kulim
Assembly	No	Years	Name	Party
Constituency created
1st	N23	1959–1964	Tai Kuan Yang (戴观阳)	Alliance (MCA)
2nd	N23	1964–1969	Leong Man Kai (梁文楷)	Alliance (MCA)
		1969–1971	State assembly was suspended	
3rd	N23	1971–1973	Leong Man Kai (梁文楷)	Alliance (MCA)
3rd	N23	1973–1974	Leong Man Kai (梁文楷)	BN (MCA)
4th	N25	1974–1978	Leong Man Kai (梁文楷)	BN (MCA)
5th	N25	1978–1982	Leong Man Kai (梁文楷)	BN (MCA)
6th	N25	1982–1986	Yong Pau Chak (杨品泽)	BN (MCA)
7th	N27	1986–1990	Yong Pau Chak (杨品泽)	BN (MCA)
8th	N27	1990–1995	Yong Pau Chak (杨品泽)	BN (MCA)
9th	N35	1995–1999	Yong Pau Chak (杨品泽)	BN (MCA)
10th	N35	1999–2004	Yong Pau Chak (杨品泽)	BN (MCA)
11th	N35	2004–2008	Boey Chin Gan (梅振仁)	BN (MCA)
12th	N35	2008–2013	Lim Soo Nee (林思年)	PR (PKR)
13th	N35	2013–2018	Chua Thiong Gee (蔡通易)	BN (MCA)
14th	N35	2018–2023	Yeo Keng Chuan (杨庆传)	PH (PKR)
15th	N35	2023–present	Wong Chia Zhen (黄佳祯)	PN (GERAKAN)

== Election results ==
Kedah state election, 2023
Party	Candidate	Votes	%	∆%
PN	Wong Chia Zhen	23,278	59.97	▲59.97
PH	Teh Lean Ong	15,536	40.03	▼1.52
Total valid votes		38,814	100.00	
Total rejected ballots		327		
Unreturned ballots		36		
Turnout		39,177	72.32	▼9.28
Registered electors		54,169		
Majority		7,742	19.94	▲7.87
PN gain from PKR		Swing		?

Kedah state election, 2018
Party	Candidate	Votes	%	∆%
PKR	Yeo Keng Chuan	13,070	41.55	▼5.80
BN	Chua Thiong Gee	9,275	29.48	▼20.08
PAS	Mohd Khairi Mohd Salleh	9,080	28.86	▲28.86
Parti Rakyat Malaysia	Lee Ah Leong	34	0.11	▲0.11
Total valid votes		31,459	100.00	
Total rejected ballots		469		
Unreturned ballots		0		
Turnout		31,459	81.60	▼4.50
Registered electors		38,572		
Majority		3,795	12.07	▲9.86
PKR gain from BN		Swing		?

Kedah state election, 2013
Party	Candidate	Votes	%	∆%
BN	Chua Thiong Gee	14,384	49.56	▲5.15
PKR	Chu Maw Nian	13,741	47.35	▼2.99
Pan-Malaysian Islamic Front	Mohd Junip Huzayin	898	3.09	▲3.09
Total valid votes		29,023	100.00	
Total rejected ballots		496		
Unreturned ballots		113		
Turnout		29,632	86.10	▲10.04
Registered electors		34,404		
Majority		643	2.21	▼3.72
BN gain from PKR		Swing		?

Kedah state election, 2008
Party	Candidate	Votes	%	∆%
PKR	Lim Soo Nee	10,559	50.34	▲29.10
BN	Lim Lee Choo	9,315	44.41	▼24.35
Independent	Khairul Anuar Ramli	1,101	5.25	▲5.25
Total valid votes		20,975	100.00	
Total rejected ballots		554		
Unreturned ballots		222		
Turnout		21,751	76.06	▼0.48
Registered electors		28,598		
Majority		1,244	5.93	▼31.59
PKR gain from BN		Swing		?

Kedah state election, 2004
Party	Candidate	Votes	%	∆%
BN	Boey Chin Gan	13,497	68.76	▼1.93
PKR	Tang Fuie Wah	6,132	31.24	▲31.24
Total valid votes		19,629	100.00	
Total rejected ballots		640		
Unreturned ballots		509		
Turnout		20,778	76.54	▲4.14
Registered electors		27,147		
Majority		7,365	37.52	▲3.86
BN hold		Swing		

Kedah state election, 1999
Party	Candidate	Votes	%	∆%
BN	Yong Pau Chak	11,653	66.83	▼13.80
PAS	Azizi Hj. Abdullah	5,785	33.17	▲33.17
Total valid votes		17,438	100.00	
Total rejected ballots		473		
Unreturned ballots		388		
Turnout		18,299	72.40	▲2.68
Registered electors		25,276		
Majority		5,868	33.66	▼27.60
BN hold		Swing		

Kedah state election, 1995
Party	Candidate	Votes	%	∆%
BN	Yong Pau Chak	13,090	80.63	▲8.30
S46	Che'at Ibrahim	3,144	19.37	▼8.30
Total valid votes		16,234	100.00	
Total rejected ballots		597		
Unreturned ballots		295		
Turnout		17,126	69.72	▼2.55
Registered electors		24,564		
Majority		9,946	61.26	▲16.60
BN hold		Swing		

Kedah state election, 1990
Party	Candidate	Votes	%	∆%
BN	Yong Pau Chak	13,308	72.33	▼7.85
S46	Hasim Leman	5,090	27.67	▲27.67
Total valid votes		18,398	100.00	
Total rejected ballots		680		
Unreturned ballots		0		
Turnout		19,078	72.27	▲4.37
Registered electors		26,397		
Majority		8,218	44.66	▼15.70
BN hold		Swing		

Kedah state election, 1986
Party	Candidate	Votes	%	∆%
BN	Yong Pau Chak	12,456	80.18	▲7.82
PAS	Zakaria Abdullah	3,079	19.82	▲5.89
Total valid votes		15,535	100.00	
Total rejected ballots		544		
Unreturned ballots		0		
Turnout		16,079	67.90	▼6.02
Registered electors		23,680		
Majority		9,377	60.36	▲1.93
BN hold		Swing		

Kedah state election, 1982
Party	Candidate	Votes	%	∆%
BN	Yong Pau Chak	10,247	72.36	▼7.22
DAP	Lee Chuan Sam @ Lee Shuan Sun	1,973	13.93	▲13.93
PAS	Md. Yusof Haji Mohamad	1,942	13.71	▼6.77
Total valid votes		14,162	100.00	
Total rejected ballots		284		
Unreturned ballots		0		
Turnout		14,446	73.92	▲0.91
Registered electors		19,543		
Majority		8,274	58.43	▼0.61
BN hold		Swing		

Kedah state election, 1978
Party	Candidate	Votes	%	∆%
BN	Leong Man Kai	9,180	79.52	▲79.52
PAS	Abdul Aziz Haji Kassim	2,364	20.48	▲20.48
Total valid votes		11,544	100.00	
Total rejected ballots		623		
Unreturned ballots		0		
Turnout		12,167	73.01	
Registered electors		16,665		
Majority		6,816	59.04	
BN hold		Swing		

Kedah state election, 1974
Party	Candidate	Votes	%	∆%
On Nomination Day, Leong Man Kai won uncontested.
BN	Leong Man Kai			
Total valid votes			100.00	
Total rejected ballots				
Unreturned ballots				
Turnout				
Registered electors		14,339		
Majority				
BN hold		Swing		

Kedah state election, 1969
Party	Candidate	Votes	%	∆%
Alliance	Leong Man Kai	7,890	76.59	▲5.74
PMIP	Khatib Shorbaini Haji Hassan	2,411	23.41	▲23.41
Total valid votes		10,301	100.00	
Total rejected ballots		1,019		
Unreturned ballots		0		
Turnout		11,320	68.60	▼2.20
Registered electors		16,494		
Majority		5,479	53.18	▲11.48
Alliance hold		Swing		

Kedah state election, 1964
Party	Candidate	Votes	%	∆%
Alliance	Leong Man Kai	7,938	70.85	▼0.04
Socialist Front	Liew Min Sung	3,266	29.15	▲9.39
Total valid votes		11,204	100.00	
Total rejected ballots		606		
Unreturned ballots		0		
Turnout		11,810	70.80	▼2.10
Registered electors		16,675		
Majority		4,436	41.70	▼9.43
Alliance hold		Swing		

Kedah state election, 1959
Party	Candidate	Votes	%
Alliance	Tai Kuan Yang	6,151	70.89
Socialist Front	Choong An Fong	1,715	19.76
PMIP	Khatib Shorbaini Haji Hassan	811	9.35
Total valid votes		8,677	100.00
Total rejected ballots		335	
Unreturned ballots		0	
Turnout		9,012	72.90
Registered electors		12,363	
Majority		4,436	51.13
This was a new constituency created.
