= Chua Thiong Gee =

Malaysian politician

Chua Thiong Gee SDK AMK
- 蔡通易

Member of the Kedah State Legislative Assembly for Kulim
- In office 5 May 2013 – 9 May 2018
- Preceded by: Lim Soo Nee (PR–PKR)
- Succeeded by: Yeo Keng Chuan (PH–PKR)
- Majority: 643 (2013)

Personal details
- Born: 6 July 1972 (age 53) Kulim, Kedah, Malaysia
- Party: Malaysian Chinese Association (MCA)
- Other political affiliations: Barisan Nasional (BN)
- Occupation: Politician, Lawyer

Chua Thiong Gee (born 6 July 1972) is a Malaysian politician who served as Member of the Kedah State Legislative Assembly (MLA) for Kulim from May 2013 to May 2018. He is a member of Malaysian Chinese Association (MCA), a component party of Barisan Nasional (BN) coalition.

== Election results ==
Kedah State Legislative Assembly
Year	Constituency	Candidate	Votes	Pct	Opponent(s)	Votes	Pct	Ballots cast	Majority	Turnout
2013	N35 Kulim	Chua Thiong Gee (MCA)	14,384	49.56%	Chu Maw Nian (PKR)	13,741	47.35%	29,632	643	86.10%
2013	N35 Kulim	Chua Thiong Gee (MCA)	14,384	49.56%	Mohd Junip Huzayin (BERJASA)	898	3.09%	29,632	643	86.10%
2018	N35 Kulim	Chua Thiong Gee (MCA)	9,275	29.48%	Yeo Keng Chuan (PKR)	13,070	41.55%	31,459	3,795	81.60%
2018	N35 Kulim	Chua Thiong Gee (MCA)	9,275	29.48%	Mohd Khairi Mohd Salleh (PAS)	9,080	28.86%	31,459	3,795	81.60%
2018	N35 Kulim	Chua Thiong Gee (MCA)	9,275	29.48%	Lee Ah Leong (PRM)	34	0.11%	31,459	3,795	81.60%

== Honours ==
- Kedah
  - Companion of the Order of Loyalty to the Royal House of Kedah (SDK) (2017)
  - Member of the Order of the Crown of Kedah (AMK) (2014)
