= Zamil Ibrahim =

Malaysian politician

- زاميل إبراهيم
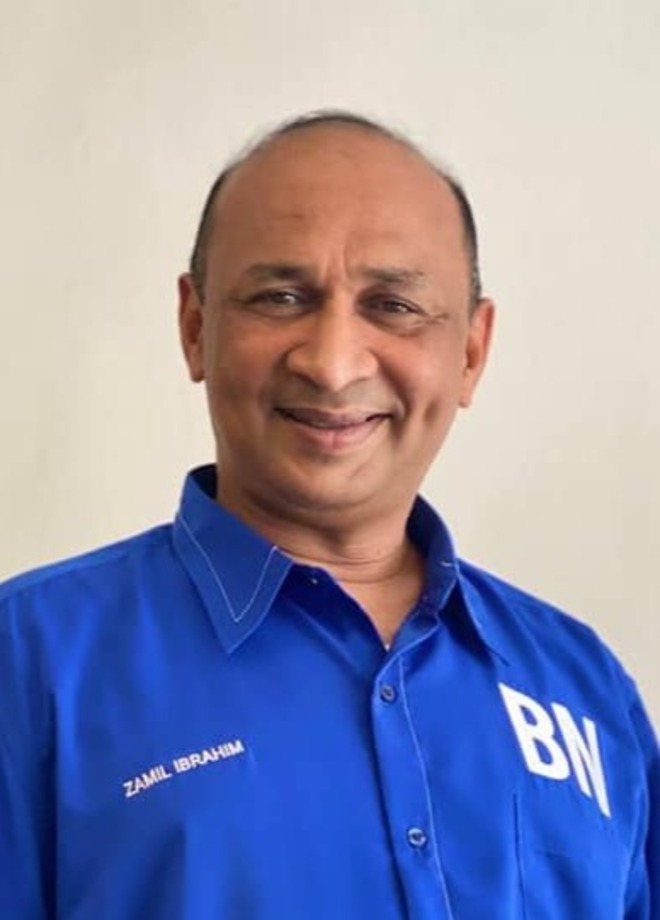
- Zamil in 2022

President of Parti Keadilan Insan Tanah Air (KITA)

Personal details
- Born: Zamil bin Ibrahim Kedah, Malaysia
- Party: United Malays National Organisation (UMNO); Independent (IND); Parti Keadilan Insan Tanah Air (KITA); People's Justice Party (PKR)
- Other political affiliations: Barisan Nasional (BN)
- Occupation: Politician, businessman
- Nickname: Zamil BPH (Note: Abbreviation for "Butuh Pak Hang", an expletive that had been said by Zamil and has become synonymous with him.)

Zamil bin Ibrahim (Jawi: زاميل بن إبراهيم), or better known as Zamil BPH, is a Malaysian politician and businessman who is the former President of the Parti Keadilan Insan Tanah Air (KITA). He once served as a special officer to Najib Razak. He is also a strong supporter of the former prime minister, Najib Razak.

== Political career ==
=== 2013 state election ===
In the 2013 Malaysian general election, Zamil has expressed his intention to contest in the seat of Sidam as an independent candidate. He has added that "he is confident that he can compete as a 'third force' in the political system in this country, especially to give the people the best choice to determine their own leader."

== Controversies and issues ==
=== Arrested by MACC on charges of extortion ===
In November 2024, Zamil was arrested by the Malaysian Anti-Corruption Commission (MACC) on charges of blackmailing and asking for a bribe of RM20,000 from a mudir who managed a maahad tahfiz in Kedah. He was arrested at Masjid Bidong, Gurun, Kedah when he wanted to take money amounting to RM20,000 from the mudir maahad tahfiz in question and was taken by the MACC to the Alor Setar court for the remand process.

After being released from MACC, Zamil denied the charges and filed a police report to clear his name.

== Election results ==
Kedah State Legislative Assembly
| Year | Constituency | Candidate | Votes | Pct | Opponent(s) | Votes | Pct | Ballots cast | Majority | Turnout |
|---|---|---|---|---|---|---|---|---|---|---|
| 2013 | N29 Sidam | Zamil Ibrahim (IND) | 347 | 1.63% | Robert Ling Kui Ee (PKR) | 13,189 | 62.01% | 21,513 | 5,964 | 85.54% |
| 2013 | N29 Sidam | Zamil Ibrahim (IND) | 347 | 1.63% | Bee Sieong Heng (GERAKAN) | 7,225 | 33.97% | 21,513 | 5,964 | 85.54% |
| 2013 | N29 Sidam | Zamil Ibrahim (IND) | 347 | 1.63% | Ooi Beng Kooi (IND) | 268 | 1.26% | 21,513 | 5,964 | 85.54% |
| 2013 | N29 Sidam | Zamil Ibrahim (IND) | 347 | 1.63% | Tan Hock Kuat (IND) | 197 | 0.93% | 21,513 | 5,964 | 85.54% |
| 2013 | N29 Sidam | Zamil Ibrahim (IND) | 347 | 1.63% | Uh Chorng Von (KITA) | 42 | 0.20% | 21,513 | 5,964 | 85.54% |
