= Gurun (state constituency) =

State constituency in Kedah, Malaysia

Gurun (N22)
Kedah constituency

State constituency
- Legislature: Kedah State Legislative Assembly
MLA
Baddrol Bakhtiar
PN
- Constituency created: 1984
- First contested: 1986
- Last contested: 2023

Demographics
- Electors (2023): 40,941

Gurun is a state constituency in Kedah, Malaysia, that has been represented in the Kedah State Legislative Assembly.

== Demographics ==
As of 2020, Gurun has a population of 53,055 people.

Ethnic breakdown of Gurun's electorate as of 2023
1. Malay (62.6%)
2. Chinese (21.6%)
3. Indian (14.8%)
4. Other ethnicities (0.95%)

== History ==
=== Polling districts ===
According to the gazette issued on 30 March 2018, the Gurun constituency has a total of 18 polling districts.

| State constituency | Polling districts | Code | Location |
|---|---|---|---|
| Gurun（N22） | Pekan Jeniang | 012/22/01 | SMK Tunku Sulong |
| Gurun（N22） | Kampung Jeniang | 012/22/02 | SK Jeniang (Pusat) |
| Gurun（N22） | Batu Sepuloh | 012/22/03 | SJK (C) Jeniang |
| Gurun（N22） | Batu 9 | 012/22/04 | SK Jeniang (Pusat) |
| Gurun（N22） | Padang Lembu | 012/22/05 | SJK (C) Mah Wah Padang Lembu |
| Gurun（N22） | Sungai Rotan | 012/22/06 | SJK (C) Yang Kao |
| Gurun（N22） | Gurun | 012/22/07 | SK Gurun (Pusat) |
| Gurun（N22） | Pulau Chengai | 012/22/08 | SK Gurun (Pusat) |
| Gurun（N22） | Bongkok Gurun | 012/22/09 | SK Batu Empat |
| Gurun（N22） | Pekan Gurun | 012/22/10 | SJK (C) Choong Hwa |
| Gurun（N22） | Pekan Baru Gurun | 012/22/11 | SK Sri Jerai |
| Gurun（N22） | Kampung Gurun | 012/22/12 | SMA Pekan Gurun |
| Gurun（N22） | Taman Seri Jerai | 012/22/13 | SMK Gurun |
| Gurun（N22） | Ladang Jerai | 012/22/14 | SJK (T) Ladang Harvard Bahagian I |
| Gurun（N22） | Sungai Puntar | 012/22/15 | SJK (T) Ladang Sungai Puntar |
| Gurun（N22） | Sungai Tok Pawang | 012/22/16 | SK Sungai Tok Pawang |
| Gurun（N22） | Kampung Mesjid | 012/22/17 | SK Bedong |
| Gurun（N22） | Pekan Bahru Bedong | 012/22/18 | SMK Bedong |

=== Representation history ===
Kedah State Legislative Assemblyman for Gurun
| Assembly | No | Years | Member | Party |
Constituency created from Yan and Merbok
| 7th | N17 | 1986–1990 | Cheah Soon Hai (谢顺海) | BN (MCA) |
| 8th | N17 | 1990–1995 | Beh Heng Seong (马兴松) | BN (MCA) |
| 9th | N25 | 1995–1999 | Beh Heng Seong (马兴松) | BN (MCA) |
| 10th | N25 | 1999–2004 | Beh Heng Seong (马兴松) | BN (MCA) |
| 11th | N22 | 2004–2008 | Beh Heng Seong (马兴松) | BN (MCA) |
| 12th | N22 | 2008–2013 | Leong Yong Kong (梁荣光) | BN (MCA) |
| 13th | N22 | 2013–2018 | Leong Yong Kong (梁荣光) | BN (MCA) |
| 14th | N22 | 2018–2022 | Johari Abdul | PH (PKR) |
| 14th | N22 | 2022–2023 | Vacant (Note: Vacant from 13 December 2022 until the 2023 state election due to the incumbent's resignation to be nominated as the Speaker of Dewan Rakyat.) | |
| 15th | N22 | 2023–present | Baddrol Bakhtiar | PN (PAS) |

== Election results ==
Kedah state election, 2023
| Party | Candidate | Votes | % | ∆% |
|---|---|---|---|---|
| PN | Baddrol Bakhtiar | 17,771 | 61.28 | ▲61.28 |
| PH | Mohammed Firdaus Johari | 11,187 | 38.72 | ▼8.95 |
| Total valid votes | | 28,958 | 100.00 | |
| Total rejected ballots | | 245 | | |
| Unreturned ballots | | 21 | | |
| Turnout | | 29,223 | 71.38 | ▼9.82 |
| Registered electors | | 40,941 | | |
| Majority | | 6,584 | 22.56 | ▲3.87 |
| PN gain from PKR | | Swing | | ? |

Kedah state election, 2018
| Party | Candidate | Votes | % | ∆% |
|---|---|---|---|---|
| PKR | Johari Abdul | 10,732 | 47.67 | ▲0.68 |
| BN | Boey Chin Gan | 6,525 | 28.98 | ▼24.03 |
| PAS | Muzaini Azizan | 5,257 | 22.70 | ▲22.70 |
| Independent | Palaniappan Marimuthu | 167 | 0.72 | ▲0.72 |
| Total valid votes | | 22,514 | 100.00 | |
| Total rejected ballots | | 414 | | |
| Unreturned ballots | | 0 | | |
| Turnout | | 23,155 | 81.20 | ▼3.60 |
| Registered electors | | 28,530 | | |
| Majority | | 4,207 | 18.69 | ▲12.67 |
| PKR gain from BN | | Swing | | ? |

Kedah state election, 2013
| Party | Candidate | Votes | % | ∆% |
|---|---|---|---|---|
| BN | Leong Yong Kong | 11,411 | 53.01 | ▼1.96 |
| PKR | Salma Ismail | 10,115 | 46.99 | ▲1.96 |
| Total valid votes | | 21,526 | 100.00 | |
| Total rejected ballots | | 492 | | |
| Unreturned ballots | | 59 | | |
| Turnout | | 22,077 | 84.80 | ▲11.10 |
| Registered electors | | 28,530 | | |
| Majority | | 1,296 | 6.02 | ▼3.92 |
| BN hold | | Swing | | |

Kedah state election, 2008
| Party | Candidate | Votes | % | ∆% |
|---|---|---|---|---|
| BN | Leong Yong Kong | 8,589 | 54.97 | ▼16.10 |
| PKR | Kalai Vanan Bala Sundram | 7,035 | 45.03 | ▲20.72 |
| Total valid votes | | 15,624 | 100.00 | |
| Total rejected ballots | | 798 | | |
| Unreturned ballots | | 42 | | |
| Turnout | | 16,464 | 73.70 | ▼1.29 |
| Registered electors | | 22,339 | | |
| Majority | | 1,554 | 9.94 | ▼36.82 |
| BN hold | | Swing | | |

Kedah state election, 2004
| Party | Candidate | Votes | % | ∆% |
|---|---|---|---|---|
| BN | Beh Heng Seong | 10,748 | 71.07 | ▲1.32 |
| PKR | Kalai Vanan Bala Sundram | 3,677 | 24.31 | ▲24.31 |
| DAP | Tan Choy | 698 | 4.62 | ▲4.62 |
| Total valid votes | | 15,123 | 100.00 | |
| Total rejected ballots | | 685 | | |
| Unreturned ballots | | 0 | | |
| Turnout | | 15,808 | 74.99 | ▲4.63 |
| Registered electors | | 21,081 | | |
| Majority | | 7,071 | 46.76 | ▲8.26 |
| BN hold | | Swing | | |

Kedah state election, 1999
| Party | Candidate | Votes | % | ∆% |
|---|---|---|---|---|
| BN | Beh Heng Seong | 9,240 | 69.75 | ▼6.85 |
| PAS | Ahmad Rashid | 4,007 | 31.25 | ▲31.25 |
| Total valid votes | | 13,247 | 100.00 | |
| Total rejected ballots | | 477 | | |
| Unreturned ballots | | 16 | | |
| Turnout | | 13,740 | 70.36 | ▲1.44 |
| Registered electors | | 19,529 | | |
| Majority | | 5,233 | 38.50 | ▼13.70 |
| BN hold | | Swing | | |

Kedah state election, 1995
| Party | Candidate | Votes | % | ∆% |
|---|---|---|---|---|
| BN | Beh Heng Seong | 9,741 | 76.60 | ▲7.58 |
| S46 | Abdul Majid Mat Isa | 2,976 | 24.40 | ▼7.58 |
| Total valid votes | | 12,717 | 100.00 | |
| Total rejected ballots | | 485 | | |
| Unreturned ballots | | 0 | | |
| Turnout | | 13,202 | 68.92 | ▼2.52 |
| Registered electors | | 19,156 | | |
| Majority | | 6,765 | 52.20 | ▲15.16 |
| BN hold | | Swing | | |

Kedah state election, 1990
| Party | Candidate | Votes | % | ∆% |
|---|---|---|---|---|
| BN | Beh Heng Seong | 10,219 | 69.02 | ▲3.22 |
| S46 | Abdul Majid Mat Isa | 4,587 | 31.98 | ▲31.98 |
| Total valid votes | | 14,806 | 100.00 | |
| Total rejected ballots | | 597 | | |
| Unreturned ballots | | 0 | | |
| Turnout | | 15,403 | 71.44 | ▼0.18 |
| Registered electors | | 21,562 | | |
| Majority | | 5,632 | 37.04 | ▼11.87 |
| BN hold | | Swing | | |

Kedah state election, 1986
| Party | Candidate | Votes | % |
|---|---|---|---|
| BN | Sang Cheok Seong | 8,656 | 65.86 |
| PAS | Abdullah Yamman | 2,228 | 16.95 |
| DAP | Lee Chuan Sun | 2,200 | 16.89 |
| Total valid votes | | 13,144 | 100.00 |
| Total rejected ballots | | 571 | |
| Unreturned ballots | | 0 | |
| Turnout | | 13,655 | 71.62 |
| Registered electors | | 19,066 | |
| Majority | | 6,428 | 48.91 |
This was a new constituency created.
