= Sungai Petani (federal constituency) =

Federal constituency of Kedah, Malaysia

Sungai Petani (P015)
Kedah constituency

Federal constituency
- Legislature: Dewan Rakyat
- MP: Mohammed Taufiq Johari; PH
- Constituency created: 1958
- First contested: 1959
- Last contested: 2022

Demographics
- Population (2020): 275,439
- Electors (2023): 170,352
- Area (km²): 261
- Pop. density (per km²): 1,055.3

Sungai Petani is a federal constituency in Kuala Muda District, Kedah, Malaysia, that has been represented in the Dewan Rakyat since 1959.

The federal constituency was created in the 1958 redistribution and is mandated to return a single member to the Dewan Rakyat under the first past the post voting system.

== Demographics ==
https://live.chinapress.com.my/ge15/parliament/KEDAH

Ethnic breakdown of Sungai Petani's electorate as of 2022
1. Malay (61.7%)
2. Chinese (19.8%)
3. Indian (18.2%)
4. Other ethnicities (0.30%)

As of 2020, Sungai Petani has a population of 275,439 people.

Age breakdown of Sungai Petani's electorate as of 2022
1. 18-20 (7.43%)
2. 21-29 (24.4%)
3. 30-39 (20.8%)
4. 40-49 (16.0%)
5. 50-59 (14.4%)
6. 60-69 (10.5%)
7. 70-79 (4.72%)
8. 80-89 (1.45%)
9. above 90 (0.32%)
Gender breakdown of Sungai Petani's electorate as of 2022
1. Male (49.0%)
2. Female (51.0%)

== History ==
=== Polling districts ===
According to the federal gazette issued on 18 July 2023, the Sungai Petani constituency is divided into 50 polling districts.

State constituency	Polling Districts	Code	Location
Pantai Merdeka (N27）	Bukit Kechik	015/27/01	SK Bukit Kechik
Pantai Merdeka (N27）	Bukit Meriam	015/27/02	Maktab Mahmud Kuala Muda
Pantai Merdeka (N27）	Sintok Bugis	015/27/03	Maktab Mahmud Kuala Muda
Pantai Merdeka (N27）	Padang Salim	015/27/04	SK Seri Kuala
Pantai Merdeka (N27）	Kuala Muda	015/27/05	Dewan KEDA Kampung Tepi Sungai
Pantai Merdeka (N27）	Haji Kudong	015/27/06	SK Haji Sulaiman
Pantai Merdeka (N27）	Kota Kuala Muda	015/27/07	SK Kota Kuala Muda
Pantai Merdeka (N27）	Sungai Mas	015/27/08	SMK Kota Kuala Muda
Pantai Merdeka (N27）	Rantau Panjang	015/27/09	SK Rantau Panjang
Pantai Merdeka (N27）	Pekan Tikam Batu	015/27/10	SJK (C) Peng Min
Pantai Merdeka (N27）	Kampung Simpor	015/27/11	SK Simpor
Pantai Merdeka (N27）	Batu Lintang	015/27/12	SMK Teluk Bayu
Pantai Merdeka (N27）	Simpor Timor	015/27/13	SK Darulaman
Pantai Merdeka (N27）	Telok Wang	015/27/14	SMK Sungai Pasir
Pantai Merdeka (N27）	Kampung Berapit	015/27/15	SK Berapit
Pantai Merdeka (N27）	Kampung Tikam Batu	015/27/16	SK Tikam Batu
Pantai Merdeka (N27）	Pekula	015/27/17	SMK Pekula Jaya
Pantai Merdeka (N27）	Padang Temusu	015/27/18	SJK (C) Tai Tong
Pantai Merdeka (N27）	Pinang Tunggal	015/27/19	SMK Pinang Tunggal
Bakar Arang (N28）	Taman Dahlia	015/28/01	Pusat Bimbingan Islam Sultan Abdul Halim Mu'adzam Shah (PUSBA)
Bakar Arang (N28）	Jalan Pengkalan	015/28/02	SMK Khir Johari
Bakar Arang (N28）	Kolam Air	015/28/03	SK St. Theresa
Bakar Arang (N28）	Bandar	015/28/04	SK Khir Johari
Bakar Arang (N28）	Simpang Tiga Pekan Lama	015/28/05	Dewan Annasamy Pillai, Pekan Lama
Bakar Arang (N28）	Peteri	015/28/06	SMK Convent Father Barre
Bakar Arang (N28）	Kampung Bahru	015/28/07	SK Petani Jaya
Bakar Arang (N28）	Taman Sentosa	015/28/08	SJK (C) Sin Kwang
Bakar Arang (N28）	Taman Delima	015/28/09	SMK Tunku Ismail
Bakar Arang (N28）	Taman Intan	015/28/10	SK Tunku Ismail
Bakar Arang (N28）	Bakar Arang	015/28/11	SMK Bakar Arang
Bakar Arang (N28）	Taman Arked	015/28/12	SK Bakar Arang
Bakar Arang (N28）	Taman Makmur	015/28/13	SMK Che Tom
Bakar Arang (N28）	Sungai Pasir	015/28/14	SK Sungai Pasir
Bakar Arang (N28）	Taman Nilam	015/28/15	SK Taman Intan
Bakar Arang (N28）	Taman Sejati Indah	015/28/16	SK Seri Gedong; SJK (T) Kalaimagal
Bakar Arang (N28）	Taman Sri Wang	016/28/17	SK Taman Sri Wang
Bakar Arang (N28）	Taman Keladi	015/28/18	SMJK Sin Min; SJK (T) Taman Keladi
Sidam（N29）	Taman Ria Jaya	015/29/01	SMK Taman Ria Jaya; SK Bukit Kiara
Sidam（N29）	Taman Mutiara	015/29/02	SK Sungai Petani
Sidam（N29）	Pekan Lama	015/29/03	SJK (C) Pekan Lama
Sidam（N29）	Padang Buloh	015/29/04	SK Sidam Kiri
Sidam（N29）	Kampung Sidam	015/29/05	SK Sidam Kiri
Sidam（N29）	Kampung Raja	015/29/06	SMK Dato' Bijaya Setia
Sidam（N29）	Scarboro	015/29/07	SJK (T) Ladang Scarboro Bahagian 2
Sidam（N29）	Pengkalan Lebai Man	015/29/08	SMK Pengkalan Lebai Man
Sidam（N29）	Taman Sutera	015/29/09	SMK Sungai Pasir Kechil
Sidam（N29）	Seri Impian	015/29/10	SJK (C) Min Terk
Sidam（N29）	Puteri Jaya	015/29/11	SK Bandar Puteri Jaya; SMK Bandar Puteri Jaya
Sidam（N29）	Kampung Sarukam	015/29/12	SK Seri Pinang
Sidam（N29）	Pantai Prai	015/29/13	SK Pantai Prai

=== Representation history ===
Members of Parliament for Sungai Petani
Parliament	No	Years	Member	Party	Vote Share
Constituency created from Sungei Muda
Sungei Patani
Parliament of the Federation of Malaya
1st	P012	1959–1963	Abdul Samad Osman (عبدالصمد عثمان)	Alliance (UMNO)	9,186; 61.82%
Parliament of Malaysia
1st	P012	1963–1964	Abdul Samad Osman (عبدالصمد عثمان)	Alliance (UMNO)	9,186; 61.82%
2nd	P012	1964–1969	Mohamed Zahir Ismail (محمد ظاهير إسماعيل)	Alliance (UMNO)	14,177; 70.23%
		1969–1971	Parliament was suspended		
3rd	P012	1971–1973	Azahari Md. Taib (أزهري مد طائب)	Alliance (UMNO)	8,931; 43.67%
3rd	P012	1973–1974	Azahari Md. Taib (أزهري مد طائب)	BN (UMNO)	8,931; 43.67%
4th	P013	1974–1978	Wan Zainab M. A. Bakar (وان زينب م. أ. بكر)	BN (UMNO)	22,266; 84.72%
5th	P013	1978–1982	Wan Zainab M. A. Bakar (وان زينب م. أ. بكر)	BN (UMNO)	24,422; 71.49%
6th	P013	1982–1986	Wan Zainab M. A. Bakar (وان زينب م. أ. بكر)	BN (UMNO)	24,554; 69.60%
Sungai Petani
7th	P014	1986–1990	Abdul Manaf Ahmad (عبدالمناف أحمد)	BN (UMNO)	18,269; 53.68%
8th	P014	1990–1995	Che Ibrahim Mustafa (چي إبراهيم مصطفى)	BN (UMNO)	23,333; 62.41%
9th	P015	1995–1999	Che Ibrahim Mustafa (چي إبراهيم مصطفى)	BN (UMNO)	35,918; 78.74%
10th	P015	1999–2004	Mahadzir Mohd Khir (محاضر محمّد خير)	BN (UMNO)	31,875; 61.75%
11th	P015	2004–2008	Mahadzir Mohd Khir (محاضر محمّد خير)	BN (UMNO)	36,067; 66.02%
12th	P015	2008–2013	Johari Abdul (جوهري عبدول)	PR (PKR)	33,822; 58.05%
13th	P015	2013–2015	Johari Abdul (جوهري عبدول)	PR (PKR)	44,194; 55.37%
13th	P015	2015–2018	Johari Abdul (جوهري عبدول)	PH (PKR)	44,194; 55.37%
14th	P015	2018–2022	Johari Abdul (جوهري عبدول)	PH (PKR)	45,532; 49.21%
15th	P015	2022–present	Mohammed Taufiq Johari (محمّد توفيق جوهري)	PH (PKR)	50,580; 38.91%

=== State constituency ===
Parliamentary constituency	State constituency						
Parliamentary constituency	1955–1959*	1959–1974	1974–1986	1986–1995	1995–2004	2004–2018	2018–present
Sungai Petani					Bakar Arang		
Sungai Petani				Pantai Merdeka			
Sungai Petani					Sidam		
Sungai Petani				Tikam Batu			
Sungei Patani			Kuala Ketil				
Sungei Patani		Pekan Sungei Patani					
Sungei Patani		Sungei Patani Luar					
Sungei Patani			Tikam Batu				

=== Historical boundaries ===
State Constituency	Area					
State Constituency	1959	1974	1984	1994	2003	2018
Bakar Arang				Bakar Arang; Kampung Baru Sungai Pasir; Matang Gadong; Sungai Petani; Sungai Layar	Bakar Arang; Bandar Perdana; Kampung Baru Sungai Pasir; Matang Gadong; Sungai Petani	
Kuala Ketil		Bukit Selambau; Kampung Batu Dua; Kampung Pulau Tengah; Kampung Sungai Pasir Kechil; Kuala Ketil				
Pantai Merdeka			Kampung Bukit Sungai Pasir; Kampung Padang Temusu; Kuala Muda; Pantai Merdeka; Sungai Petani	Batu Lintang; Kampung Permatang Pasir; Kuala Muda; Pantai Merdeka; Tikam Batu		
Pekan Sungei Patani	Bakar Arang; Kampung Batu Dua; Sungai Petani; Taman Cindai Jaya; Taman Petani Jaya					
Sidam				Bandar Perdana; Bandar Puteri Jaya; Bandar Sri Astana; Kampung Sungai Pasir Kechil; Sidam Kiri	Bandar Puteri Jaya; Bandar Sri Astana; Kampung Raja; Kampung Sungai Pasir Kechil; Sidam Kiri	Bandar Mutiara; Bandar Puteri Jaya; Bandar Sri Astana; Kampung Raja; Sidam Kiri
Sungei Patani Luar	Bukit Selambau; Kampung Permatang Pasir; Sungai Lalang; Sungai Layar; Tikam Batu					
Tikam Batu		Kampung Matang Gadong; Kuala Muda; Sungai Layar; Sungai Petani; Tikam Batu	Kampung Bagan Ulu; Kampung Bukit Sungaai Pasir; Kampung Permatang Pasir; Kuala Muda; Padang Temusu			

=== Current state assembly members ===
No.	State Constituency	Member	Coalition (Party)
N27	Pantai Merdeka	Sharir Long	PN (PAS)
N28	Bakar Arang	Adam Loh Wei Chai	PH (PKR)
N29	Sidam	Bau Wong Bau Ek	PH (PKR)

=== Local governments & postcodes ===
No.	State Constituency	Local Government	Postcode
N27	Pantai Merdeka	Sungai Petani Municipal Council	08000, 08600 Sungai Petani
N28	Bakar Arang	Sungai Petani Municipal Council	08000, 08600 Sungai Petani
N29	Sidam	Sungai Petani Municipal Council	08000, 08600 Sungai Petani

== Election results ==
Malaysian general election, 2022
Party	Candidate	Votes	%	∆%
PH	Mohammed Taufiq Johari	50,580	38.91	▲38.91
PN	Robert Ling Kui Ee	49,465	38.05	▲38.05
BN	Shahanim Mohamad Yusoff	27,391	21.07	▼4.83
PEJUANG	Marzuki Yahya	2,342	1.80	▲1.80
Parti Rakyat Malaysia	Tan Chow Kang	226	0.17	▼0.13
Total valid votes		130,004	100.00	
Total rejected ballots		1,187		
Unreturned ballots		256		
Turnout		131,447	77.85	▼5.51
Registered electors		168,847		
Majority		1,115	0.86	▼22.45
PH hold		Swing		
Source(s) https://lom.agc.gov.my/ilims/upload/portal/akta/outputp/1753260/PUB%20606%20(2022).pdf

Malaysian general election, 2018
Party	Candidate	Votes	%	∆%
PKR	Johari Abdul	45,532	49.21	▼6.16
BN	Shahanim Mohamad Yusoff	23,963	25.90	▼17.51
PAS	Sharir Long	22,760	24.60	▲24.60
Parti Rakyat Malaysia	Sritharan Pichathu	279	0.30	▲0.30
Total valid votes		92,534	100.00	
Total rejected ballots		889		
Unreturned ballots		424		
Turnout		93,847	83.36	▼3.60
Registered electors		112,577		
Majority		21,569	23.31	▲11.35
PKR hold		Swing		
Source(s) "His Majesty's Government Gazette - Notice of Contested Election, Parliament for the State of Kedah [P.U. (B) 233/2018]" (PDF). Attorney General's Chambers of Malaysia. 3 May 2018. "Federal Government Gazette - Results of Contested Election and Statements of the Poll after the Official Addition of Votes, Parliamentary Constituencies for the State of Kedah [P.U. (B) 307/2018]" (PDF). Attorney General's Chambers of Malaysia. 28 May 2018.

Malaysian general election, 2013
Party	Candidate	Votes	%	∆%
PKR	Johari Abdul	44,194	55.37	▼2.68
BN	Syamsul Anuar Che Mey @ Ismail	34,646	43.41	▲1.46
Independent	Ong Wei Sin	772	0.97	▲0.97
KITA	Suhaimi Hashim	200	0.25	▲0.25
Total valid votes		79,812	100.00	
Total rejected ballots		959		
Unreturned ballots		253		
Turnout		81,024	86.96	▲9.12
Registered electors		93,176		
Majority		9,548	11.96	▼4.14
PKR hold		Swing		
Source(s) "Federal Government Gazette - Notice of Contested Election, Parliament for the State of Kedah [P.U. (B) 170/2013]" (PDF). Attorney General's Chambers of Malaysia. 26 April 2013. Archived from the original (PDF) on 2019-12-29. "Federal Government Gazette - Results of Contested Election and Statements of the Poll after the Official Addition of Votes, Parliamentary Constituencies for the State of Kedah [P.U. (B) 211/2013]" (PDF). Attorney General's Chambers of Malaysia. 22 May 2013.

Malaysian general election, 2008
Party	Candidate	Votes	%	∆%
PKR	Johari Abdul	33,822	58.05	▲24.07
BN	Zainuddin Maidin	24,441	41.95	▼24.07
Total valid votes		58,263	100.00	
Total rejected ballots		986		
Unreturned ballots		129		
Turnout		59,378	77.84	▼0.61
Registered electors		76,284		
Majority		9,381	16.10	▼15.94
PKR gain from BN		Swing		?

Malaysian general election, 2004
Party	Candidate	Votes	%	∆%
BN	Mahadzir Mohd Khir	36,067	66.02	▲4.27
PKR	Zamri Yusuf	18,565	33.98	▼4.27
Total valid votes		54,632	100.00	
Total rejected ballots		1,007		
Unreturned ballots		0		
Turnout		55,639	78.45	▲1.91
Registered electors		70,922		
Majority		17,502	32.04	▲8.54
BN hold		Swing		

Malaysian general election, 1999
Party	Candidate	Votes	%	∆%
BN	Mahadzir Mohd Khir	31,875	61.75	▼16.99
PKR	Johari Abdul	19,742	38.25	▲38.25
Total valid votes		51,617	100.00	
Total rejected ballots		1,151		
Unreturned ballots		2,689		
Turnout		55,457	76.54	▲2.63
Registered electors		72,454		
Majority		12,133	23.50	▼33.98
BN hold		Swing		

Malaysian general election, 1995
Party	Candidate	Votes	%	∆%
BN	Che Ibrahim Mustafa	35,918	78.74	▲16.33
S46	Syed Mansor Syed Salim	9,697	21.26	▼16.33
Total valid votes		45,615	100.00	
Total rejected ballots		1,785		
Unreturned ballots		678		
Turnout		48,078	73.91	▲1.04
Registered electors		65,049		
Majority		26,221	57.48	▲32.66
BN hold		Swing		

Malaysian general election, 1990
Party	Candidate	Votes	%	∆%
BN	Che Ibrahim Mustafa	23,333	62.41	▲8.73
S46	Abdullah Hashim	14,052	37.59	▲37.59
Total valid votes		37,385	100.00	
Total rejected ballots		1,077		
Unreturned ballots		0		
Turnout		38,462	72.87	▲0.93
Registered electors		52,783		
Majority		9,281	24.82	▼4.24
BN hold		Swing		

Malaysian general election, 1986
Party	Candidate	Votes	%	∆%
BN	Abdul Manaf Ahmad	18,269	53.68	▼15.92
DAP	R. Karuppaiah	8,380	24.62	▲0.54
PAS	Razak Daud	7,386	21.70	▲16.42
Total valid votes		34,035	100.00	
Total rejected ballots		840		
Unreturned ballots		0		
Turnout		34,875	71.94	▲7.19
Registered electors		48,478		
Majority		9,889	29.06	▼16.46
BN hold		Swing		

Malaysian general election, 1982: Sungei Patani
Party	Candidate	Votes	%	∆%
BN	Wan Zainab M. A. Bakar	24,554	69.60	▼1.89
DAP	Chong Kok Heong	8,497	24.08	▲24.08
PAS	Osman Darus	1,864	5.28	▼23.23
Independent	Ismail Abdul Rahman	365	1.03	▲1.03
Total valid votes		35,280	100.00	
Total rejected ballots		1,041		
Unreturned ballots		0		
Turnout		36,321	64.75	▼12.49
Registered electors		56,093		
Majority		16,057	45.52	▲2.54
BN hold		Swing		

Malaysian general election, 1978: Sungei Patani
Party	Candidate	Votes	%	∆%
BN	Wan Zainab M. A. Bakar	24,422	71.49	▼13.23
PAS	Abdul Majid Jamaludin	9,738	28.51	▲28.51
Total valid votes		34,160	100.00	
Total rejected ballots		1,260		
Unreturned ballots		0		
Turnout		35,420	77.24	▲1.57
Registered electors		45,855		
Majority		14,684	42.98	▼26.46
BN hold		Swing		

Malaysian general election, 1974: Sungei Patani
Party	Candidate	Votes	%	∆%
BN	Wan Zainab M. A. Bakar	22,266	84.72	▲84.72
Independent	Osman Abu Bakar	4,016	15.28	▲15.28
Total valid votes		26,282	100.00	
Total rejected ballots		1,489		
Unreturned ballots		0		
Turnout		27,771	75.67	▲2.43
Registered electors		36,700		
Majority		18,250	69.44	▲59.31
BN gain from Alliance Party (Malaysia) Party (Malaysia)		Swing		?

Malaysian general election, 1969: Sungei Patani
Party	Candidate	Votes	%	∆%
Alliance	Azahari Md. Taib	8,931	43.67	▼26.56
GERAKAN	Ong Boon Seong	6,859	33.54	▲33.54
PMIP	Mohamed Daud Abdullah	4,661	22.79	▲16.96
Total valid votes		20,451	100.00	
Total rejected ballots		493		
Unreturned ballots		0		
Turnout		20,944	73.24	▼3.04
Registered electors		28,595		
Majority		2,072	10.13	▼41.88
Alliance hold		Swing		

Malaysian general election, 1964: Sungei Patani
Party	Candidate	Votes	%	∆%
Alliance	Mohamed Zahir Ismail	14,177	70.23	▲8.41
Socialist Front	Teh Pek Choon	3,680	18.22	▼19.96
PMIP	Syed Jan Aljeffri	1,176	5.83	▲5.83
UDP	Ong Boon Seong	1,154	5.72	▲5.72
Total valid votes		20,187	100.00	
Total rejected ballots		527		
Unreturned ballots		0		
Turnout		20,714	76.28	▲1.25
Registered electors		27,156		
Majority		10,497	52.01	▲28.37
Alliance hold		Swing		

Malayan general election, 1959: Sungei Patani
Party	Candidate	Votes	%
Alliance	Abdul Samad Osman	9,186	61.82
Socialist Front	Mansor Tobeng	5,673	38.18
Total valid votes		14,859	100.00
Total rejected ballots		170	
Unreturned ballots		0	
Turnout		15,029	75.03
Registered electors		20,031	
Majority		3,513	23.64
This was a new constituency created.
