= Pantai Merdeka =

Beach in Kuala Muda, Kedah, Malaysia

Other transcription(s)
  - Jawi: ڤنتاي مرديک
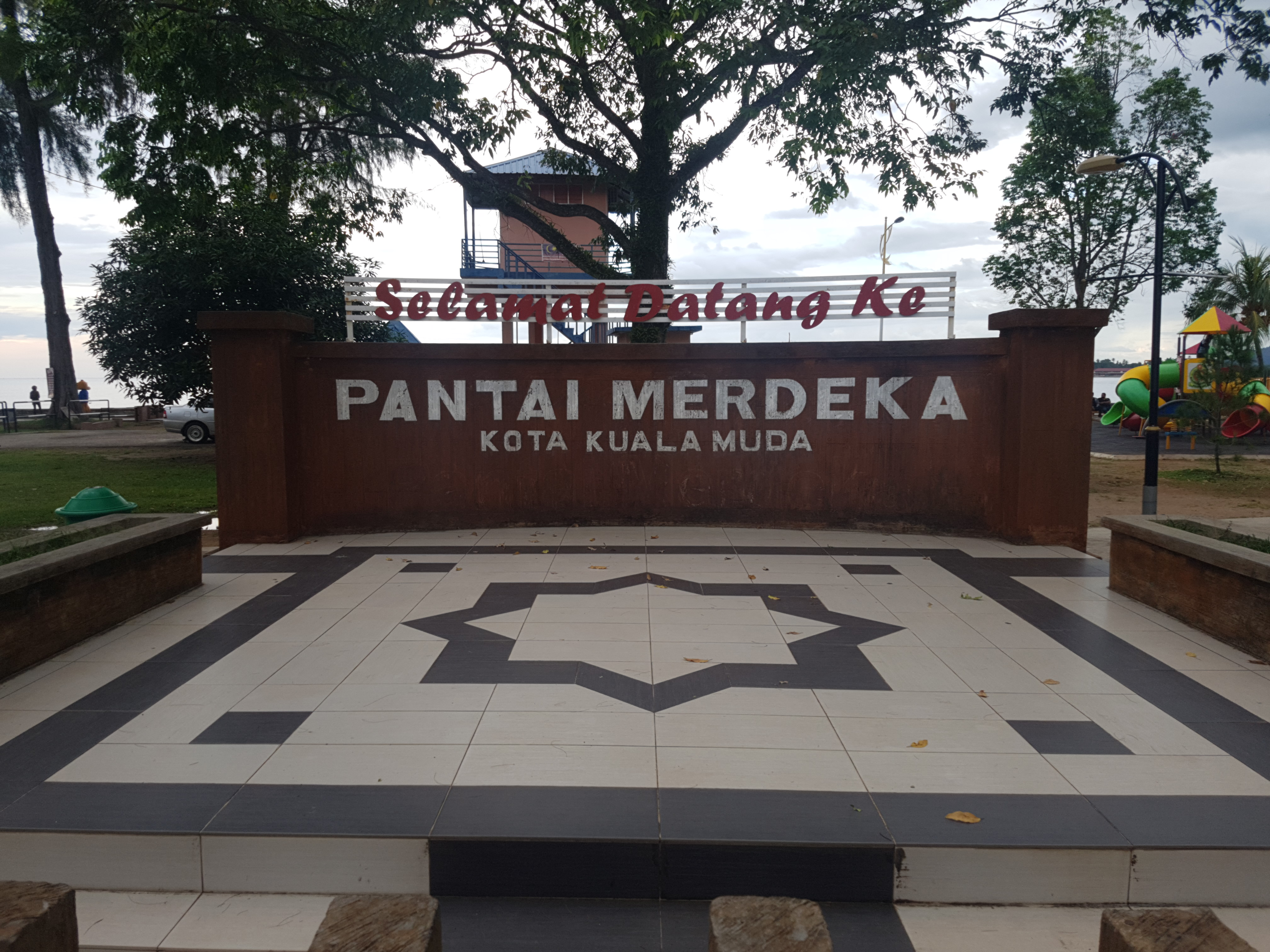

- Location within Malaysia
- Coordinates: 5.666111°N 100.3675°E
- Country: Malaysia
- State: Kedah
- Administrative District: Kuala Muda
- Electoral District: Sungai Petani
- Electoral Sub-district: Pantai Merdeka
- Municipal Council: Sungai Petani
- Time zone: UTC+8 (MST)
- Postcode: 08500

Pantai Merdeka is a coastal location in Kuala Muda District, Kedah, Malaysia. It has the only sand beach in mainland Kedah, and it is the major attraction for beach goers from all over northern Penang and Kedah State. Various accommodation is available for rent to experience the beach and other attractions in the area which includes harvesting Kepah, Siput Kemudi and Kerang (variety of sea food in local language) in Kampung Tepi Sungai, Kota Kuala Muda, Pantai Merdeka itself and also at Pulau Sayak.

Pantai Merdeka is 18 kilometres (11 mi) from Tikam Batu off the Butterworth to Alor Setar trunk road. In the early 1970s the beach attracted swimmers, picnickers and campers from Kedah state and the city of Seberang Perai. Subsequent sea erosion made the beach less popular and visitors were lost to the newly-developed beaches at Pantai Murni in Yen and Pantai Bersih in Butterworth.

In 1989 facilities at the beach were upgraded and the seawall along the 760 metres (830 yd) shoreline, originally built in 1975, was subsequently replaced.

A ferry boat across the Merbok River links Pantai Merdeka to the small town of Tanjung Dawai, which is otherwise 80 kilometres (50 mi) by road.

The beach is a popular picnic spot for local residents. Wild monkeys from the nearby forest have been observed to visit the beach to scavenge from the litter bins. The nearby forest is popular with jungle trekkers.
