= Robert Ling Kui Ee =

Malaysian politician

Robert Ling Kui Ee JP
- 林桂亿

Member of the Kedah State Executive Council
- In office 20 May 2020 – 14 August 2023
- Monarch: Sallehuddin
- Menteri Besar: Muhammad Sanusi Md Nor
- Portfolio: Housing, Environment, Unity, Chinese and Siamese Community Affairs
- Preceded by: Tan Kok Yew (Housing); Simon Ooi Tze Min (Environment, Chinese and Siamese Community Affairs); Summugam Rengasamy (Unity)
- Succeeded by: Mansor Zakaria (Housing); Mohamad Yusoff Zakaria (Environment); Halimaton Shaadiah Saad (Unity); Wong Chia Zhen (Chinese and Siamese Community Affairs)
- Constituency: Sidam

Member of the Kedah State Legislative Assembly for Sidam
- In office 5 May 2013 – 12 August 2023
- Preceded by: Tan Chow Kang (PR–PKR)
- Succeeded by: Bau Wong Bau Ek (PH–PKR)
- Majority: 5,964 (2013); 10,860 (2018)

Personal details
- Born: Robert Ling Kui Ee; 21 July 1972 (age 54) Kedah, Malaysia
- Citizenship: Malaysian
- Party: People's Justice Party (PKR) (–2020); Malaysian United Indigenous Party (BERSATU) (since 2020)
- Other political affiliations: Pakatan Rakyat (PR) (–2015); Pakatan Harapan (PH) (2015–2020); Perikatan Nasional (PN) (since 2020)
- Education: Manipal Academy of Higher Education (MBBS)
- Occupation: Politician

Robert Ling Kui Ee

Chinese name
- Traditional Chinese: 林桂億
- Simplified Chinese: 林桂亿
Transcriptions
Standard Mandarin
- Hanyu Pinyin: Lín Guì Yì
Hakka
- Pha̍k-fa-sṳ: Lìn Kwui-i̍t
Yue: Cantonese
- Jyutping: Lam4 Gwai3 Jik1
Southern Min
- Hokkien POJ: Lîm Kùi-ek

Robert Ling Kui Ee (Chinese: 林桂億; pinyin: Lín Guì Yì; Jyutping: Lam4 Gwai3 Jik1; Pe̍h-ōe-jī: Lîm Kùi-ek; Pha̍k-fa-sṳ: Lìn Kwui-i̍t; born 21 July 1972) is a Malaysian politician who served as Member of the Kedah State Executive Council (EXCO) in the Perikatan Nasional (PN) state administration under Menteri Besar Muhammad Sanusi Md Nor from May 2020 to August 2023 and Member of the Kedah State Legislative Assembly (MLA) for Sidam from May 2013 to August 2023. He is a member of the Malaysian United Indigenous Party (BERSATU), a component party of the PN coalition and was a member of the People's Justice Party (PKR), a component party of the Pakatan Harapan (PH) and formerly Pakatan Rakyat (PR) coalitions.

== Election results ==
Kedah State Legislative Assembly
Year	Constituency	Candidate	Votes	Pct	Opponent(s)	Votes	Pct	Ballots cast	Majority	Turnout
2013	N29 Sidam	Robert Ling Kui Ee (PKR)	13,189	62.01%	Bee Sieong Heng (Gerakan)	7,225	33.97%	21,513	5,964	85.54%
2013	N29 Sidam	Robert Ling Kui Ee (PKR)	13,189	62.01%	Zamil Ibrahim (IND)	347	1.63%	21,513	5,964	85.54%
2013	N29 Sidam	Robert Ling Kui Ee (PKR)	13,189	62.01%	Ooi Beng Kooi (IND)	268	1.26%	21,513	5,964	85.54%
2013	N29 Sidam	Robert Ling Kui Ee (PKR)	13,189	62.01%	Tan Hock Kuat (IND)	197	0.93%	21,513	5,964	85.54%
2013	N29 Sidam	Robert Ling Kui Ee (PKR)	13,189	62.01%	Uh Chorng Von (KITA)	42	0.20%	21,513	5,964	85.54%
2018	N29 Sidam	Robert Ling Kui Ee (PKR)	17,344	58.08%	Nur Hidayah Foo Abdullah (PAS)	6,484	21.72%	30,245	10,860	82.20%
2018	N29 Sidam	Robert Ling Kui Ee (PKR)	17,344	58.08%	Tan Kok Seong (Gerakan)	5,951	19.93%	30,245	10,860	82.20%
2018	N29 Sidam	Robert Ling Kui Ee (PKR)	17,344	58.08%	Mohd Hashim Saaludin (PRM)	80	0.27%	30,245	10,860	82.20%

Parliament of Malaysia
Year	Constituency	Candidate	Votes	Pct	Opponent(s)	Votes	Pct	Ballots cast	Majority	Turnout
2022	P015 Sungai Petani	Robert Ling Kui Ee (BERSATU)	49,465	38.05%	Mohammed Taufiq Johari (PKR)	50,580	38.91%	131,447	1,115	77.85%
2022	P015 Sungai Petani	Robert Ling Kui Ee (BERSATU)	49,465	38.05%	Shahanim Mohamad Yusoff (UMNO)	27,391	21.07%	131,447	1,115	77.85%
2022	P015 Sungai Petani	Robert Ling Kui Ee (BERSATU)	49,465	38.05%	Marzuki Yahya (PEJUANG)	2,342	1.80%	131,447	1,115	77.85%
2022	P015 Sungai Petani	Robert Ling Kui Ee (BERSATU)	49,465	38.05%	Tan Chow Kang (PRM)	226	0.17%	131,447	1,115	77.85%

== Honours ==
- Kedah
  - Justice of the Peace of Kedah (JP) (2022)
