= Mohammed Taufiq Johari =

Malaysian politician and physician

Yang Berhormat Dr. Mohammed Taufiq Johari MP
- محمّد توفيق جوهري

Minister of Youth and Sports
- Incumbent
- Assumed office 17 December 2025
- Monarch: Ibrahim
- Prime Minister: Anwar Ibrahim
- Deputy: Mordi Bimol
- Preceded by: Hannah Yeoh Tseow Suan
- Constituency: Sungai Petani

Member of Parliament for Sungai Petani
- Incumbent
- Assumed office 19 November 2022
- Preceded by: Johari Abdul (PH–PKR)
- Majority: 1,115 (2022)

Vice Youth Chief of the People's Justice Party
- Incumbent
- Assumed office 24 May 2025 Serving with: Muhammad Nabil Halimi &; Chiew Choon Man &; Pravin Murali (Appointed) &; Nadia Fathin Syahira (Appointed)
- Youth Chief: Muhammad Kamil Abdul Munim
- Preceded by: Pravin Murali

Personal details
- Born: Mohammed Taufiq bin Johari; 6 March 1996 (age 30) Kuala Lumpur, Malaysia
- Citizenship: Malaysia
- Party: People's Justice Party (PKR)
- Other political affiliations: Pakatan Harapan (PH)
- Spouse: Fathiya Ainul Mardhiyah Andri Nopendra (m. 2024)
- Parents: Johari Abdul (father); Noraini Mohd (mother)
- Relatives: Shuaib Lazim (granduncle)
- Education: Bandung Islamic University (MD)
- Occupation: Politician
- Profession: Physician

Mohammed Taufiq bin Johari (Jawi: محمّد توفيق بن جوهري; born 6 March 1996) is a Malaysian physician and politician who has served as the Minister of Youth and Sports since December 2025 and the Member of Parliament (MP) for Sungai Petani in Kedah since November 2022. He is a member and the Division Chief of Sungai Petani of the People's Justice Party (PKR), a component party of the Pakatan Harapan (PH) coalition.

He is the son of the 11th Speaker of the Dewan Rakyat and former Sungai Petani MP Johari Abdul. Elected at the age of 26, he became one of the youngest members of the Dewan Rakyat and is the sole Pakatan Harapan MP in the Kedah "Malay Belt". Following a cabinet reshuffle in late 2025, he became the youngest Cabinet minister in the Anwar Ibrahim cabinet.

== Early life and education ==
Mohammed Taufiq was born in Kuala Lumpur, Malaysia on 6 March 1996. He is the sixth child of Johari Abdul and Noraini Mohd, who had eight children together. He attended school at Gombak High School, Selangor. He pursued higher education in Indonesia, obtaining a Doctor of Medicine (MD) degree from Bandung Islamic University (Universitas Islam Bandung) in 2020.

== Political career ==
=== Early involvement ===
Prior to his election to Parliament, Mohammed Taufiq served as the Chief of the Angkatan Muda Keadilan (AMK) for both the Kedah state and the Sungai Petani division. His early work focused on strengthening party organization at the state level and mobilizing youth participation in reformist activities.

In May 2025, he was elected as one of the Vice Youth Chiefs of PKR during the party leadership election.

=== Parliamentary career ===
In the 2022 Malaysian general election, Taufiq was nominated to contest the Sungai Petani seat, replacing his father who had held the seat since 2008. The election in Sungai Petani was highly competitive, involving 168,847 registered voters. Taufiq won the seat with 50,580 votes (38.91%), defeating his closest rival Robert Ling Kui Ee from Perikatan Nasional (PN) by a slim majority of 1,115 votes. This victory made him one of only two PH representatives in the state of Kedah, which was otherwise dominated by the opposition PN coalition.

As a backbencher, Taufiq was active in debates regarding the gig economy, digital safety, and youth advocacy. In July 2025, he advocated for a clearer legal definition of gig workers, citing projections that the sector would expand to 3.5 million workers by the end of the year. He also strongly endorsed government proposals to ban social media access for children under 16 to curb cyberbullying and online harassment.

He served as the Treasurer of the All-Party Parliamentary Group Malaysia on Integrity, Governance and Anti-Corruption (APPGM-IGAR) and was appointed as a "Friend of the Ministry" by the Ministry of National Unity in August 2025. Internationally, he represented Malaysia at the Asian Parliamentary Assembly's Committee on Palestine in January 2024.

=== Minister of Youth and Sports (2025–present) ===
On 16 December 2025, Prime Minister Anwar Ibrahim announced Taufiq's appointment as the Minister of Youth and Sports, succeeding Hannah Yeoh. He was sworn in the following day at Istana Negara before the Yang di-Pertuan Agong, Sultan Ibrahim.

== Controversies and issues ==
=== Allegations of nepotism ===
During the 2022 general election, Taufiq's nomination for Sungai Petani drew criticism due to his relationship with the incumbent MP, Johari Abdul. Critics and opposition members labeled him "anak papa" (daddy's boy), alleging nepotism. This issue resurfaced in October 2023 when Pendang MP Awang Hashim used the term in the Dewan Rakyat, leading to Awang's suspension from the session. Taufiq has defended his position, stating that he went through the standard party nomination process and that his selection was based on merit and his leadership of the Kedah AMK.

=== AI deepfake blackmail attempt ===
In September 2025, Taufiq was targeted in a cyber-extortion scheme involving deepfake pornography. On 12 September, he received an email demanding RM100,000 in cryptocurrency to prevent the release of a fabricated video depicting him. He was the third PKR lawmaker to face such threats, following Wong Chen and Rafizi Ramli. Taufiq refused to pay, publicly denounced the video as AI-generated fake content, and lodged a police report. The case was investigated by Bukit Aman under Section 233 of the Communications and Multimedia Act 1998.

=== Doctor title dispute ===
In December 2025, the Malaysia Corruption Watch (MCW) called on Taufiq to provide official documentation to substantiate his use of the "Dr." title. The MCW emphasized that academic titles used by public figures should be validated to prevent misleading the public. Taufiq's biography lists a Doctor of Medicine degree from Bandung Islamic University obtained in 2020.

== Personal life ==
On 9 March 2024, Taufiq married Fathiya Ainul Mardhiyah Andri Nopendra, a 26-year-old Indonesian national. The wedding ceremony was held at the Sungai Petani Municipal Council (MPSPK) hall and was attended by high-profile dignitaries, including Prime Minister Anwar Ibrahim and cabinet ministers.

== Election results ==
Parliament of Malaysia
Year	Constituency	Candidate	Votes	Pct	Opponent(s)	Votes	Pct	Ballots cast	Majority	Turnout
2022	P015 Sungai Petani	Mohammed Taufiq Johari (PKR)	50,580	38.91%	Robert Ling Kui Ee (BERSATU)	49,465	38.05%	131,447	1,115	77.85%
2022	P015 Sungai Petani	Mohammed Taufiq Johari (PKR)	50,580	38.91%	Shahanim Mohamad Yusoff (UMNO)	27,391	21.07%	131,447	1,115	77.85%
2022	P015 Sungai Petani	Mohammed Taufiq Johari (PKR)	50,580	38.91%	Marzuki Yahya (PEJUANG)	2,342	1.80%	131,447	1,115	77.85%
2022	P015 Sungai Petani	Mohammed Taufiq Johari (PKR)	50,580	38.91%	Tan Chow Kang (PRM)	226	0.17%	131,447	1,115	77.85%

== Honours ==
=== Honours of Malaysia ===
- Malaysia
  - Recipient of the 17th Yang di-Pertuan Agong Installation Medal (2025)

== See also ==
- Members of the Dewan Rakyat, 15th Malaysian Parliament
- Anwar Ibrahim cabinet
