= Marzuki Yahya =

Malaysian politician

Yang Berbahagia Datuk Wira Marzuki Yahya DCSM DSPN PJK
- مرزوقي يحيي

Deputy Minister of Foreign Affairs
- In office 17 July 2018 – 24 February 2020
- Monarchs: Muhammad V (2018–2019); Abdullah (2019–2020)
- Prime Minister: Mahathir Mohamad
- Minister: Saifuddin Abdullah
- Preceded by: Reezal Merican Naina Merican
- Succeeded by: Kamarudin Jaffar
- Constituency: Senator

Senator Appointed by the Yang di-Pertuan Agong
- In office 17 July 2018 – 16 July 2021
- Monarchs: Muhammad V (2018–2019); Abdullah (2019–2021)
- Prime Minister: Mahathir Mohamad (2018–2020); Muhyiddin Yassin (2020–2021)

1st Deputy President of the Homeland Fighters' Party
- In office 12 August 2020 – 16 January 2023
- President: Mukhriz Mahathir
- Chairman: Mahathir Mohamad
- Preceded by: Position established
- Succeeded by: Vacant

2nd Secretary-General of the Malaysian United Indigenous Party
- In office 27 September 2018 – 18 March 2020
- President: Muhyiddin Yassin
- Chairman: Mahathir Mohamad (2018–2020); Muhyiddin Yassin (Acting, 2020)
- Preceded by: Shahruddin Md Salleh
- Succeeded by: Hamzah Zainuddin

Personal details
- Born: Marzuki bin Haji Yahya; 4 September 1970 (age 55) Yan, Kedah, Malaysia
- Citizenship: Malaysian
- Party: United Malays National Organisation (UMNO) (1998–2016); Malaysian United Indigenous Party (BERSATU) (2016–2020); Homeland Fighters Party (PEJUANG) (2020–2023); Parti Bumiputera Perkasa Malaysia (PUTRA) (since 2023)
- Other political affiliations: Barisan Nasional (BN) (1998–2016); Pakatan Harapan (PH) (2016–2020); Gerakan Tanah Air (GTA) (since 2022)
- Occupation: Politician

Marzuki bin Yahya (born 4 September 1970) is a Malaysian politician. He is a member of the Parti Bumiputera Perkasa Malaysia (PUTRA), a former member of the Homeland Fighters' Party (PEJUANG) and its Deputy President from August 2020 to his resignation in January 2023, and a former member of the Malaysian United Indigenous Party (BERSATU) and its Secretary-General from September 2018 to his termination from position in March 2020. He served as the Deputy Minister of Foreign Affairs in the Pakatan Harapan (PH) administration under former Prime Minister Mahathir Mohamad from July 2018 to the collapse of the PH administration in February 2020 and Senator from July 2018 to July 2021.

== Education ==
Marzuki had been accused of making a false claim that he holds a Bachelor of Business Administration from the University of Cambridge via distance learning. However, it was later revealed that the University of Cambridge does not offer any distance learning degree. He later clarified that he in fact obtained his degree from Cambridge International University, which is not affiliated or related to the University of Cambridge. Cambridge International University was reportedly a non-accredited institution and a diploma mill.

== Political career ==
Marzuki's involvement in the political arena began in 1998 when he was appointed as the Treasurer for United Malays National Organisation (UMNO) Youth Bagan Division. After holding several other posts in UMNO, he eventually left the party and became one of the founding members of then-opposition PPBM, led by former UMNO President, 4th and 7th Prime Minister of Malaysia Dr. Mahathir Mohamad, in 2016.

He contested the Tasek Gelugor parliamentary seat in the 14th Malaysian general election but lost with the narrowest of margins overall, at just 81 votes. Shortly thereafter, he was appointed as a Senator in the upper house of the Parliament of Malaysia and sworn in as a deputy minister by the Yang di-Pertuan Agong on 17 July 2018. On 18 November 2018, Chief Justice of Malaysia Richard Malanjum ordered the petition filed by Marzuki challenging the results of the election to go to trial. The petition was struck out by the Election Court on 15 February 2019.

== Election results ==
Parliament of Malaysia
Year	Constituency	Candidate	Votes	Pct	Opponent(s)	Votes	Pct	Ballots cast	Majority	Turnout
2018	P042 Tasek Gelugor	Marzuki Yahya (BERSATU)	18,466	35.58%	Shabudin Yahaya (UMNO)	18,547	35.73%	52,890	81	86.92%
2018	P042 Tasek Gelugor	Marzuki Yahya (BERSATU)	18,466	35.58%	Rizal Hafiz Ruslan (PAS)	14,891	28.69%	52,890	81	86.92%
2022	P015 Sungai Petani	Marzuki Yahya (PEJUANG)	2,342	1.80%	Mohammed Taufiq Johari (PKR)	50,580	38.91%	131,447	1,115	77.85%
2022	P015 Sungai Petani	Marzuki Yahya (PEJUANG)	2,342	1.80%	Robert Ling Kui Ee (BERSATU)	49,465	38.05%	131,447	1,115	77.85%
2022	P015 Sungai Petani	Marzuki Yahya (PEJUANG)	2,342	1.80%	Tan Chow Kang (PRM)	226	0.17%	131,447	1,115	77.85%

== Honours ==
- Malacca
  - Knight Commander of the Exalted Order of Malacca (DCSM) – Datuk Wira (2019)
- Penang
  - Officer of the Order of the Defender of State (DSPN) – Dato' (2018)
  - Recipient of the Meritorious Service Medal (PJK) (2002)

== See also ==
- Tasek Gelugor (federal constituency)
