= Sidam =

State constituency in Kedah, Malaysia

Sidam (N29)
Kedah constituency

State constituency
- Legislature: Kedah State Legislative Assembly
MLA
Bau Wong Bau Ek
PH
- Constituency created: 1994
- First contested: 1995
- Last contested: 2023

Demographics
- Population (2020): 122,656
- Electors (2023): 60,983

Sidam is a state constituency in Kedah, Malaysia, that has been represented in the Kedah State Legislative Assembly.

== Demographics ==
As of 2020, Sidam has a population of 122,656 people.

Ethnic breakdown of Sidam's electorate as of 2023
1. Malay (49.3%)
2. Chinese (30.8%)
3. Indian (18.7%)
4. Other ethnicities (1.22%)

== History ==
=== Polling districts ===
According to the gazette issued on 30 March 2018, the Sidam constituency has a total of 13 polling districts.

State constituency	Polling districts	Code	Location
Sidam（N29）	Taman Ria Jaya	015/29/01	SMK Taman Ria Jaya
Sidam（N29）	Taman Mutiara	015/29/02	SK Sungai Petani
Sidam（N29）	Pekan Lama	015/29/03	SJK (C) Pekan Lama
Sidam（N29）	Padang Buloh	015/29/04	SK Sidam Kiri
Sidam（N29）	Kampung Sidam	015/29/05	SK Sidam Kiri
Sidam（N29）	Kampung Raja	015/29/06	SMK Dato' Bijaya Setia
Sidam（N29）	Scarboro	015/29/07	SJK (T) Ladang Scarboro Bahagian 2
Sidam（N29）	Pengkalan Lebai Man	015/29/08	SMK Pengkalan Lebai Man
Sidam（N29）	Taman Sutera	015/29/09	Institut Pendidikan Guru Kampus Sultan Abdul Halim
Sidam（N29）	Seri Impian	015/29/10	SJK (C) Min Terk
Sidam（N29）	Puteri Jaya	015/29/11	SK Bandar Puteri Jaya
Sidam（N29）	Kampung Sarukam	015/29/12	SK Seri Pinang
Sidam（N29）	Pantai Prai	015/29/13	SK Pantai Prai

=== Representation history ===
Kedah State Legislative Assemblyman for Sidam
Assembly	No	Years	Member	Party
Constituency created from Tikam Batu
9th	N29	1995–1999	Fong Chok Gin (方卓仁)	BN (GERAKAN)
10th	N29	1999–2004	Fong Chok Gin (方卓仁)	BN (GERAKAN)
11th	N29	2004–2008	Fong Chok Gin (方卓仁)	BN (GERAKAN)
12th	N29	2008–2013	Tan Chow Kang (陈楚江)	PR (PKR)
13th	N29	2013–2015	Robert Ling Kui Ee (林桂亿)	PR (PKR)
13th	N29	2015–2018	Robert Ling Kui Ee (林桂亿)	PH (PKR)
14th	N29	2018–2020	Robert Ling Kui Ee (林桂亿)	PH (PKR)
14th	N29	2020–2023	Robert Ling Kui Ee (林桂亿)	PN (BERSATU)
15th	N29	2023–present	Bau Wong Bau Ek	PH (PKR)

== Election results ==
Kedah state election, 2023: Sidam
Party	Candidate	Votes	%	∆%
PH	Bau Wong Bau Ek	21,859	51.12	▲51.12
PN	Juliana Abdul Ghani	20,905	48.88	▲48.88
Total valid votes		42,764	100.00	
Total rejected ballots		260		
Unreturned ballots		69		
Turnout		43,093	70.66	▼11.54
Registered electors		60,983		
Majority		954	2.24	▼34.12
PH hold		Swing		

Kedah state election, 2018: Sidam
Party	Candidate	Votes	%	∆%
PKR	Robert Ling Kui Ee	17,344	58.08	▼3.93
PAS	Nur Hidayah Foo Abdullah	6,484	21.72	▲21.72
BN	Tan Kok Seong	5,951	19.93	▼14.04
Parti Rakyat Malaysia	Mohd Hashim Saaludin	80	0.27	▲0.27
Total valid votes		29,859	100.00	
Total rejected ballots		291		
Unreturned ballots		0		
Turnout		30,245	82.20	▼3.80
Registered electors		36,776		
Majority		10,860	36.36	▲8.32
PKR hold		Swing		

Kedah state election, 2013: Sidam
Party	Candidate	Votes	%	∆%
PKR	Robert Ling Kui Ee	13,189	62.01	▼0.91
BN	Bee Sieong Heng	7,225	33.97	▼3.11
Independent	Zamil Ibrahim	347	1.63	▲1.63
Independent	Ooi Beng Kooi	268	1.26	▲1.26
Independent	Tan Hock Huat	197	0.92	▲0.92
KITA	Uh Chorng Von	42	0.20	▲0.20
Total valid votes		21,268	100.00	
Total rejected ballots		245		
Unreturned ballots		129		
Turnout		21,642	86.00	▲10.75
Registered electors		25,151		
Majority		5,964	28.04	▲2.20
PKR hold		Swing		

Kedah state election, 2008: Sidam
Party	Candidate	Votes	%	∆%
PKR	Tan Chow Kang	9,470	62.92	▲33.16
BN	Fong Chok Gin	5,852	37.08	▼33.16
Total valid votes		15,052	100.00	
Total rejected ballots		392		
Unreturned ballots		33		
Turnout		15,747	75.25	▲0.69
Registered electors		20,926		
Majority		3,618	25.84	▼15.64
PKR gain from BN		Swing		?

Kedah state election, 2004: Sidam
Party	Candidate	Votes	%	∆%
BN	Fong Chok Gin	10,287	71.24	▲4.72
PKR	Lim Soo Nee	4,153	29.76	▲29.76
Total valid votes		14,440	100.00	
Total rejected ballots		359		
Unreturned ballots		3		
Turnout		14,799	74.56	▲2.60
Registered electors		19,848		
Majority		6,134	41.48	▲9.44
BN hold		Swing		

Kedah state election, 1999: Sidam
Party	Candidate	Votes	%	∆%
BN	Fong Chok Gin	11,038	66.52	▲3.46
DAP	Gnanaguru Ganisan	5,556	34.48	▲11.13
Total valid votes		16,594	100.00	
Total rejected ballots		537		
Unreturned ballots		3		
Turnout		17,134	71.96	▲1,40
Registered electors		23,810		
Majority		5,482	32.04	▼7.67
BN hold		Swing		

Kedah state election, 1995: Sidam
Party	Candidate	Votes	%
BN	Fong Chok Gin	9,230	63.06
DAP	Chong Ah Lek	3,417	23.35
PAS	Jamaludin Yahaya	1,989	13.59
Total valid votes		14,636	100.00
Total rejected ballots		351	
Unreturned ballots		12	
Turnout		14,999	70.56
Registered electors		21,257	
Majority		5,813	39.71
This was a new constituency created.
