= Ahmad Izzat Mohamad Shauki =

Malaysian politician

Deputy Speaker of the Kedah State Legislative Assembly
- In office 2008–2013
- Monarch: Abdul Halim
- Menteri Besar: Azizan Abdul Razak
- Speaker: Abdul Isa Ismail
- Succeeded by: Azmi Che Husain
- Constituency: Bukit Lada

Member of the Kedah State Legislative Assembly for Bukit Lada
- In office 8 March 2008 – 5 May 2013
- Preceded by: Ariffin Man (BN–UMNO)
- Succeeded by: Ahmad Lebai Sudin (BN–UMNO)
- Majority: 208 (2008)

Personal details
- Born: 1980
- Died: 13 October 2014 (aged 33–34) Hospital Sultanah Bahiyah, Alor Setar, Kedah
- Resting place: Tanah Perkuburan Islam Masjid Muassasah Darul Ulum, Pokok Sena, Kedah
- Party: Malaysian Islamic Party (PAS) (–2014)
- Other political affiliations: Pakatan Rakyat (PR) (2008–2014)
- Occupation: Politician

Ahmad Izzat bin Mohamad Shauki (1980-2014) is a Malaysian politician who served as Deputy Speaker of the Kedah State Legislative Assembly from 2008 to 2013 as well as Member of the Kedah State Legislative Assembly (MLA) for Bukit Lada from March 2008 to May 2013. He was a member and State Deputy Youth Chief of Kedah of Malaysian Islamic Party (PAS), a component party of Pakatan Rakyat (PR) coalitions.

== Death ==
Ahmad Izzat died on 13 October 2014. Prior that he was admitted to the hospital on 19 September after falling while praying and losing consciousness. Following that, he underwent surgery on his head because there was a blood clot due to bleeding in his brain. His body was taken back to his mother's house at Mile 2 of the Sultan Abdul Halim Highway and the funeral prayer will be held at the Derga Mosque at 10.00 am before being buried at the Muassasah Darul Ulum Mosque cemetery, Pokok Sena.

== Election results ==
Kedah State Legislative Assembly
Year	Constituency	Candidate	Votes	Pct	Opponent(s)	Votes	Pct	Ballots cast	Majority	Turnout
2008	N09 Bukit Lada	Ahmad Izzat Mohamad Shauki (PAS)	9,600	50.55%	Syeikh Alias Mustafa (UMNO)	9,392	49.45%	19,434	208	83.18%
2013	N09 Bukit Lada	Ahmad Izzat Mohamad Shauki (PAS)	11,340	46.25%	Ahmad Lebai Sudin (UMNO)	12,664	51.65%	24,521	1,324	88.90%

== Honours ==
- Kedah
  - Companion of the Order of the Crown of Kedah (SMK) (2013)
