= Musoddak Ahmad =

Malaysian politician

Yang Berhormat Senator Tuan Musoddak Ahmad SDK AMK BKM
- مصدق أحمد

Senator

Elected by Kedah State Legislative Assembly
- Incumbent
- Assumed office 20 March 2023
- Monarchs: Abdullah; Ibrahim
- Prime Minister: Anwar Ibrahim

State Secretary of the Malaysian Islamic Party of Kedah
- Incumbent
- Assumed office 2011
- Preceded by: Muhamad Yusof Husin

Personal details
- Party: Malaysian Islamic Party (PAS)
- Occupation: Politician

Musoddak bin Ahmad is a Malaysian politician who served as Senator since March 2023. He is a member of Malaysian Islamic Party (PAS), a component party of Perikatan Nasional (PN).

== Election results ==
Kedah State Legislative Assembly
Year	Constituency	Candidate	Votes	Pct	Opponent(s)	Votes	Pct	Ballots cast	Majority	Turnout
2008	N30 Bayu	Musoddak Ahmad (PAS)	11,606	46.97%	Azmi Che Husain (UMNO)	12,590	52.03%	24,519	984	83.98%
2013	N21 Guar Chempedak	Musoddak Ahmad (PAS)	7,860	45.85%	Ku Abd Rahman Ku Ismail (UMNO)	10,158	54.15%	18,295	2,298	86.80%
2018	N21 Guar Chempedak	Musoddak Ahmad (PAS)	6,259	33.90%	Ku Abd Rahman Ku Ismail (UMNO)	6,518	35.30%	18,819	259	83.10%
2018	N21 Guar Chempedak	Musoddak Ahmad (PAS)	6,259	33.90%	Mohd Saffuan Sabari (BERSATU)	5,686	30.80%	18,819	259	83.10%

== Honours ==
- Kedah :
  - Companion of the Order of Loyalty to the Royal House of Kedah (SDK) (2021)
  - Member of the Order of the Crown of Kedah (AMK) (2013)
  - Recipient of the Public Service Star (BKM) (2009)
