= Ku Abdul Rahman Ku Ismail =

Malaysian politician

Yang Berhormat Mulia Dato' Wira Ku Abd Rahman Ku Ismail DGMK DSDK JP MP
- كو عبدالرحمٰن كو إسماعيل

Member of the Malaysian Parliament for Kubang Pasu
- Incumbent
- Assumed office 19 November 2022
- Preceded by: Amiruddin Hamzah (PH–BERSATU)
- Majority: 31,584 (2022)

Member of the Kedah State Legislative Assembly for Guar Chempedak
- In office 8 March 2008 – 12 August 2023
- Preceded by: Abdul Razak Hashim (BN–UMNO)
- Succeeded by: Abdul Ghafar Saad (PN–BERSATU)
- Majority: 1,759 (2008); 2,298 (2013); 259 (2018)

Exco roles (Kedah)
- 2013–2016: Chairman of the Industry, Investment, Domestic Trade, Consumer Affairs and Co-operatives
- 2016–2018: Chairman of the Industry, Investment, IMT–GT, Domestic Trade, Consumer Affairs and Co-operatives
- 2020–2023: Chairman of the Industry, Investment, Higher Education, Science, Technology and Innovation

Faction represented in Dewan Rakyat
- 2022–: Perikatan Nasional

Faction represented in the Kedah State Legislative Assembly
- 2008–2018: Barisan Nasional
- 2018–2019: Independent
- 2019–2020: Pakatan Harapan
- 2020: Malaysian United Indigenous Party
- 2020–2023: Perikatan Nasional

Personal details
- Born: Ku Abdul Rahman Ku Ismail; 23 September 1952 (age 73) Kedah, Federation of Malaya (now Malaysia)
- Citizenship: Malaysia
- Party: United Malays National Organisation (UMNO) (until 2018); Independent (2018–2019); Malaysian United Indigenous Party (BERSATU) (2019–present)
- Other political affiliations: Barisan Nasional (BN) (until 2018); Pakatan Harapan (PH) (2018–2020); Perikatan Nasional (PN) (2020–present)
- Relations: Ku Abdul Halim Ku Ismail (Younger brother)
- Education: Bachelor of Science in Polymer Technology (University of North London, UK) (1976); Master of Science in Polymer Technology (Loughborough University, UK) (1979); Doctorate in Rubber Science and Technology (Loughborough University, UK) (1983)
- Occupation: Politician

Ku Abd Rahman bin Ku Ismail is a Malaysian politician who has served as the Member of Parliament (MP) for Kubang Pasu since November 2022. He served as Member of the Kedah State Executive Council (EXCO) in the Perikatan Nasional (PN) state administration under Menteri Besar Muhammad Sanusi Md Nor from May 2020 to August 2023 and in the Barisan Nasional (BN) state administration under former Menteris Besar Mukhriz Mahathir and Ahmad Bashah Md Hanipah from May 2013 to the collapse of the BN state administration in May 2018 as well as Member of the Kedah State Legislative Assembly (MLA) for Guar Chempedak from March 2008 to August 2023. He is a member of the Malaysian United Indigenous Party (BERSATU), a component party of the PN coalition and was a member of the United Malays National Organisation (UMNO), a component party of the BN coalition.

== Election results ==
Kedah State Legislative Assembly
Year	Constituency	Candidate	Votes	Pct	Opponent(s)	Votes	Pct	Ballots cast	Majority	Turnout
2008	N21 Guar Chempedak	Ku Abd Rahman Ku Ismail (UMNO)	7,898	56.27%	Mohamad Ismail (PAS)	6,139	43.73%	14,278	1,759	78.40%
2013	N21 Guar Chempedak	Ku Abd Rahman Ku Ismail (UMNO)	10,158	56.38%	Musoddak Ahmad (PAS)	7,860	43.62%	18,244	2,298	86.52%
2018	N21 Guar Chempedak	Ku Abd Rahman Ku Ismail (UMNO)	6,518	35.30%	Musoddak Ahmad (PAS)	6,259	33.90%	18,819	259	83.10%
2018	N21 Guar Chempedak	Ku Abd Rahman Ku Ismail (UMNO)	6,518	35.30%	Mohd Saffuan Sabari (BERSATU)	5,686	30.80%	18,819	259	83.10%

Parliament of Malaysia
Year	Constituency	Candidate	Votes	Pct	Opponent(s)	Votes	Pct	Ballots cast	Majority	Turnout
2022	P006 Kubang Pasu	Ku Abd Rahman Ku Ismail (BERSATU)	47,584	57.05%	Mohd Aizuddin Ariffin (PKR)	16,000	19.18%	83,402	31,584	77.07%
2022	P006 Kubang Pasu	Ku Abd Rahman Ku Ismail (BERSATU)	47,584	57.05%	Hasmuni Hassan (UMNO)	14,489	17.37%	83,402	31,584	77.07%
2022	P006 Kubang Pasu	Ku Abd Rahman Ku Ismail (BERSATU)	47,584	57.05%	Amiruddin Hamzah (PEJUANG)	5,329	6.39%	83,402	31,584	77.07%

== Honours ==
=== Honours of Malaysia ===
- Malaysia
  - Recipient of the 17th Yang di-Pertuan Agong Installation Medal (2024)
- Kedah
  - Knight Commander of the Glorious Order of the Crown of Kedah (DGMK) – Dato' Wira (2016)
  - Knight Companion of the Order of Loyalty to the Royal House of Kedah (DSDK) – Dato' (2006)
  - Justice of the Peace (JP) (2014)
