= Azmi Che Husain =

Malaysian politician

Yang Berbahagia Dato' Azmi Che Husain PJN DSDK AMK PJK

Deputy Speaker of the Kedah State Legislative Assembly
- In office 23 June 2013 – 2018
- Monarchs: Abdul Halim (2013–2017); Sallehuddin (2017–2018)

Azmi bin Che Husain is a Malaysian politician. He served as Deputy Speaker of the Kedah State Legislative Assembly from 2013 to 2018 and was a Member of the Kedah State Legislative Assembly (MLA) for Bayu from March 2008 to May 2018. He is a member of United Malays National Organisation (UMNO), a component party of Barisan Nasional (BN) coalitions.

== Political career ==
Husain was elected as Bayu assemblyman in the 2008 state election with 984 votes. In the 2013 state election, he was reelected as Bayu assemblyman. He was elected Deputy Speaker of the Kedah State Legislative Assembly.

In 2016, Mukhriz Mahathir resigned as Menteri Besar. Ahmad Bashah Md Hanipah was appointed as Menteri Besar of Kedah.

== Election results ==
Kedah State Legislative Assembly
| Year | Constituency | Candidate | Votes | Pct | Opponent(s) | Votes | Pct | Ballots cast | Majority | Turnout |
|---|---|---|---|---|---|---|---|---|---|---|
| 2008 | N30 Bayu | Azmi Che Husain (UMNO) | 12,590 | 52.03% | Musoddak Ahmad (PAS) | 11,606 | 46.97% | 24,519 | 984 | 83.98% |
| 2013 | N30 Bayu | Azmi Che Husain (UMNO) | 17,240 | 56.81% | Mahmud Yaakob (PAS) | 13,108 | 43.19% | 30,850 | 4,132 | 89.20% |

== Recognition ==
- Malaysia
  - Commander of the Order of Meritorious Service (PJN) – Datuk (2012)
- Kedah
  - Knight Companion of the Order of Loyalty to the Royal House of Kedah (DSDK) – Dato' (2014)
  - Member of the Order of the Crown of Kedah (AMK) (2006)
  - Recipient of the Meritorious Service Medal (PJK)
