= Mahadzir Abdul Hamid =

Malaysian politician

Mahadzir Abdul Hamid AMK PJK JP

Member of the Kedah State Legislative Assembly for Jeneri
- In office 5 May 2013 – 9 May 2018
- Preceded by: Yahya Abdullah (PR–PAS)
- Succeeded by: Muhammad Sanusi Md Nor (GS–PAS)
- Majority: 2,060 (2013)

Personal details
- Born: 16 November 1975 (age 50) Kedah, Malaysia
- Party: United Malays National Organisation (UMNO)
- Other political affiliations: Barisan Nasional (BN)
- Education: Universiti Utara Malaysia

Mahadzir bin Abdul Hamid (born 16 November 1975) is a Malaysian politician. He is a Member of the Kedah State Legislative Assembly (MLA) for Jeneri from May 2013 to May 2018. He is a member of United Malays National Organization (UMNO), a component party of Barisan Nasional (BN) coalitions.

== Early life ==
Mahadzir Abdul Hamid was born on 16 November 1975 in Kedah.

== Education ==
He attended the Sekolah Menengah Kebangsaan Jeneri and obtained the Malaysian Certificate of Education (SPM) in 1992. He continued his studies at Sekolah Menengah Kebangsaan Sik and obtained the Malaysian Higher School Certificate (STPM) in 1994. Furthermore, he attended the Universiti Utara Malaysia (UUM) and completed his studies with a bachelor's degree in Business Management in 1998.

== Election results ==
Kedah State Legislative Assembly
Year	Constituency	Candidate	Votes	Pct	Opponent(s)	Votes	Pct	Ballots cast	Majority	Turnout
2013	N24 Jeneri	Mahadzir Abdul Hamid (UMNO)	12,318	54.56%	Ahmad Tarmizi Sulaiman (PAS)	10,258	45.44%	22,576	2,060	89.80%
2018	N24 Jeneri	Mahadzir Abdul Hamid (UMNO)	8,171	35.61%	Muhammad Sanusi Md Nor (PAS)	10,626	46.32%	27,641	2,455	84.70%
2018	N24 Jeneri	Mahadzir Abdul Hamid (UMNO)	8,171	35.61%	Mohd Nazri Abu Hassan (BERSATU)	4,146	18.07%	27,641	2,455	84.70%

== Honours ==
- Kedah
  - Member of the Exalted Order of the Crown of Kedah (AMK) (2014)
  - Recipient of the Meritorious Service Medal (PJK) (2003)
  - Justice of the Peace (JP) (2016)
