= Mohd Azam Abd Samat =

Malaysian politician

Yang Berhormat Dato' Ustaz Mohd Azam Abd Samat DSSS SDK PJK MLA
- محمد عزم عبدالصمد

Member of the Kedah State Executive Council
- Incumbent
- Assumed office 21 August 2023
- Monarch: Sallehuddin
- Menteri Besar: Muhammad Sanusi Md Nor
- Portfolio: Education, Religion, Communication and Information
- Preceded by: Najmi Ahmad (Education & Religion); Wan Romani Wan Salim (Communication & Information)
- Constituency: Sungai Limau

Member of the Kedah State Legislative Assembly for Sungai Limau
- Incumbent
- Assumed office 4 November 2013
- Preceded by: Azizan Abdul Razak (PR–PAS)
- Majority: 1,084 (2013); 5,973 (2018); 18,904 (2023)

Personal details
- Born: Mohd Azam bin Abd Samat
- Party: Malaysian Islamic Party (PAS)
- Other political affiliations: Pakatan Rakyat (PR) (2008–2015); Gagasan Sejahtera (GS) (2016–2020); Perikatan Nasional (PN) (since 2020)
- Occupation: Politician

Mohd Azam bin Abd Samat is a Malaysian politician who has served as Member of the Kedah State Executive Council (EXCO) in the Perikatan Nasional (PN) state administration under Menteri Besar Muhammad Sanusi Md Nor since August 2023 and Member of the Kedah State Legislative Assembly (MLA) for Sungai Limau since November 2013. He is a member of the Malaysian Islamic Party (PAS), a component party of the PN and formerly Gagasan Sejahtera (GS) as well as Pakatan Rakyat (PR) coalitions.

== Election results ==
Kedah State Legislative Assembly
| Year | Constituency | Candidate | Votes | Pct | Opponent(s) | Votes | Pct | Ballots cast | Majority | Turnout |
|---|---|---|---|---|---|---|---|---|---|---|
| 2013 | N20 Sungai Limau | Mohd Azam Abd Samat (PAS) | 12,069 | 52.35% | Sohaimi Lazim (UMNO) | 10,985 | 47.65% | 23,205 | 1,084 | 85.24% |
| 2018 | N20 Sungai Limau | Mohd Azam Abd Samat (PAS) | 13,048 | 53.01% | Norma Awang (UMNO) | 7,075 | 28.74% | 24,616 | 5,973 | 86.60% |
| 2018 | N20 Sungai Limau | Mohd Azam Abd Samat (PAS) | 13,048 | 53.01% | Zahran Abdullah (AMANAH) | 4,493 | 18.25% | 24,616 | 5,973 | 86.60% |
| 2023 | N20 Sungai Limau | Mohd Azam Abd Samat (PAS) | 23,000 | 84.88% | Siti Balkhis Husain (AMANAH) | 4,096 | 15.21% | 27,244 | 18,904 | 79.47% |

== Honours ==
- Kedah
  - Knight Companion of the Order of Loyalty to Sultan Sallehuddin of Kedah (DSSS) – Dato' (2024)
  - Companion of the Order of Loyalty to the Royal House of Kedah (SDK) (2021)
  - Recipient of the Meritorious Service Medal (PJK) (2012)
