= Bukit Selambau (state constituency) =

Political subdivision in Malaysia

Bukit Selambau (N25)
Kedah constituency

State constituency
- Legislature: Kedah State Legislative Assembly
MLA
Azizan Hamzah
PN
- Constituency created: 1984
- First contested: 1986
- Last contested: 2023

Demographics
- Electors (2023): 79,518

Bukit Selambau is a state constituency in Kedah, Malaysia, that has been represented in the Kedah State Legislative Assembly since 1986.

The state constituency was created in the 1984 redistribution and is mandated to return a single member to the Kedah State Legislative Assembly under the first past the post voting system. This constituency has recorded 15 candidates to contest by-election in 2009, the most candidates ever in Malaysia election history.

== Demographics ==
As of 2020, Bukit Selambau has a population of 150,632 people.

Ethnic breakdown of Bukit Selambau's electorate as of 2023
1. Malay (61.3%)
2. Indian (20.1%)
3. Chinese (17.4%)
4. Other ethnicities (1.17%)

== History ==
=== Polling districts ===
According to the gazette issued on 30 March 2018, the Bukit Selambau constituency has a total of 21 polling districts.

State constituency	Polling districts	Code	Location
Bukit Selambau (N25）	Kuala Sin	014/25/01	SK Kuala Sin
Bukit Selambau (N25）	Kampung Sungkap	014/25/02	SK Bukit Selambau
Bukit Selambau (N25）	Bukit Lembu	014/25/03	SK Aman Jaya
Bukit Selambau (N25）	Taman Bandar Baru	014/25/04	SK Bandar Baru Sungai Lalang
Bukit Selambau (N25）	Sungai Lalang	014/25/05	SJK (C) Chung Hwa
Bukit Selambau (N25）	Taman Desa Aman	014/25/06	SK Sungai Lalang
Bukit Selambau (N25）	Bandar Laguna Merbok	014/25/07	Kolej Vokesional Sungai Petani 2
Bukit Selambau (N25）	Tasek Apong	014/25/08	SK Tasek Apong
Bukit Selambau (N25）	Air Menideh	014/25/09	SJK (T) Saraswathy
Bukit Selambau (N25）	Jalan Badlishah	014/25/10	SMK Bandar Sungai Petani
Bukit Selambau (N25）	Taman Peruda	014/25/11	Institut Kemahiran MARA Sungai Petani
Bukit Selambau (N25）	Taman Ria Utara	014/25/12	SK Taman Ria
Bukit Selambau (N25）	United Petani	014/25/13	SJK (T) Arumugam Pillai
Bukit Selambau (N25）	Petani Rara	014/25/14	SK Patani Rara
Bukit Selambau (N25）	Bukit Rusa	014/35/15	SJK (T) Palanisamy Kumaran
Bukit Selambau (N25）	Pekan Bukit Selambau	014/25/16	SJK (C) Fuh Sun
Bukit Selambau (N25）	Kampung Pokok Machang	014/25/17	SMK Bukit Selambau
Bukit Selambau (N25）	Bati Belachan	014/25/18	SMK Seri Wangsa
Bukit Selambau (N25）	Titi Panjang	014/25/19	SK Dataran Muda
Bukit Selambau (N25）	Ambangan Height	014/25/20	SMK Aman Jaya
Bukit Selambau (N25）	Taman Ria Selatan	014/25/21	SM Sains Sultan Mohamad Jiwa

=== Representation history ===
Members of the Legislative Assembly for Bukit Selambau
Assembly	No	Years	Member	Party
Constituency created from Jeniang, Kuala Ketil and Kupang
7th	N20	1986–1990	Badri Yunus	BN (UMNO)
8th	N20	1990–1995	Badri Yunus	BN (UMNO)
9th	N24	1995–1999	Saravanan Velia Udayar	BN (MIC)
10th	N24	1999–2004	Saravanan Velia Udayar	BN (MIC)
11th	N25	2004–2008	Saravanan Velia Udayar	BN (MIC)
12th	N25	2008	Arumugam Vengatarakoo	Independent
12th	N25	2008–2009	Arumugam Vengatarakoo	PR (PKR)
12th	N25	2009–2013	Manikumar Subramanian	PR (PKR)
13th	N25	2013–2018	Krishnamoorthy Rajannaidu	PR (PKR)
14th	N25	2018–2023	Summugam Rengasamy	PH (PKR)
15th	N25	2023–present	Azizan Hamzah	PN (PAS)

== Election results ==
Kedah state election, 2023
Party	Candidate	Votes	%	∆%
PN	Azizan Hamzah	33,508	60.13	▲60.13
PH	Summugam Rengasamy	21,843	39.20	▼5.91
Independent	Dinesh Muniandy	375	0.67	▲0.67
Total valid votes		55,726	100.00	
Total rejected ballots		313		
Unreturned ballots		61		
Turnout		56,100	70.55	▼11.30
Registered electors		79,518		
Majority		11,665	20.93	▲6.47
PN gain from PKR		Swing		?

Kedah state election, 2018
Party	Candidate	Votes	%	∆%
PKR	Summugam Rengasamy	17,573	45.11	▼3.82
PAS	Mohd Ali Sulaiman	11,938	30.64	▲30.64
BN	Jaspal Singh Gurbakhes Singh	9,449	24.25	▼23.39
Total valid votes		38,960	100.00	
Total rejected ballots		488		
Unreturned ballots		141		
Turnout		39,589	81.85	▼3.76
Registered electors		48,367		
Majority		5,635	14.46	▲13.17
PKR hold		Swing		

Kedah state election, 2013
Party	Candidate	Votes	%	∆%
PKR	Krishnamoorthy Rajannaidu	20,091	48.93	▼3.30
BN	Maran Mutaya	19,561	47.64	▲5.33
Independent	Syed Omar Syed Mahamud	936	2.28	▲2.28
KITA	Kamal Nasser Thow Beek	388	0.94	▲0.94
Independent	Thivagaran Supramany	83	0.20	▲0.20
Total valid votes		41,059	100.00	
Total rejected ballots		839		
Unreturned ballots		125		
Turnout		42,023	85.61	▲15.57
Registered electors		49,087		
Majority		530	1.29	▼8.73
PKR hold		Swing		
Source(s) "Federal Government Gazette – Notice of Contested Election, State Legislative Assembly for the State of Kedah [P.U. (B) 186/2013]" (PDF). Attorney General's Chambers of Malaysia. 26 April 2013. "Federal Government Gazette – Results of Contested Election and Statements of the Poll after the Official Addition of Votes, State Constituencies for the State of Kedah [P.U. (B) 227/2013]" (PDF). Attorney General's Chambers of Malaysia. 22 May 2013.

Kedah state by-election, 2009 Bukit Selambau by-election 7 April 2009 Upon the resignation of incumbent, Arumugam Vengatarakoo
Party	Candidate	Votes	%	∆%
PKR	Manikumar Subramanian	12,632	52.23	▲52.23
BN	Ganesan Subramaniam	10,229	42.31	▼2.79
Independent	Anuar Abdul Hamid	528	2.18	▲2.18
Independent	Husaini Yaacob	257	1.06	▲1.06
Independent	Mohd Fazil Abdul Wahab	83	0.34	▲0.34
Independent	Tan Hock Huat	78	0.32	▲0.32
Independent	T Chandrarajan Thanasagaran	73	0.30	▲0.30
Independent	Abdul Rahim Abu	60	0.25	▲0.25
Independent	Sarala Loganathan	49	0.20	▲0.20
Independent	Moganakumar Subramaniam	46	0.19	▲0.19
Independent	Jayagopal Adaikkalam	35	0.14	▲0.14
Independent	Venason Micheal	32	0.13	▲0.13
Independent	Loganathan Ramachandran	31	0.13	▲0.13
Independent	Khamis Awang	29	0.12	▲0.12
Independent	Radzi Md Lazim	25	0.10	▲0.10
Total valid votes		24,187	100.00	
Total rejected ballots		415		
Unreturned ballots		9		
Turnout		24,611	70.04	▼3.72
Registered electors		35,140		
Majority		2,403	10.02	▲0.22
PKR gain from Independent		Swing		?
Source(s) "Pilihan Raya Kecil N.25 Bukit Selambau". Election Commission of Malaysia.

Kedah state election, 2008
Party	Candidate	Votes	%	∆%
Independent	Arumugam Vengatarakoo	13,225	54.90	▲54.90
BN	Krishnan Subramaniam	10,863	45.10	▼14.12
Total valid votes		24,088	100.00	
Total rejected ballots		1,694		
Unreturned ballots		16		
Turnout		25,798	73.76	▼3.36
Registered electors		34,977		
Majority		2,362	9.80	▼23.93
Independent gain from BN		Swing		?

Kedah state election, 2004
Party	Candidate	Votes	%	∆%
BN	Saravanan Velia Udayar	14,196	62.22	▼4.15
PKR	Mustafa Khalid Hanafi	6,501	28.49	▲28.49
DAP	Gnanaguru Ganisan	2,120	9.29	▲9.29
Total valid votes		22,817	100.00	
Total rejected ballots		496		
Unreturned ballots		70		
Turnout		23,383	77.12	▲3.40
Registered electors		30,322		
Majority		7,695	33.73	▼0.54
BN hold		Swing		

Kedah state election, 1999
Party	Candidate	Votes	%	∆%
BN	Saravanan Velia Udayar	11,416	66.37	▼2.98
PAS	Hamdan Mohamed Khalib	5,522	32.10	▲12.99
Independent	Kalaichelvan	264	1.53	▲1.53
Total valid votes		17,202	100.00	
Total rejected ballots		498		
Unreturned ballots		10		
Turnout		17,710	73.72	▲2.72
Registered electors		24,023		
Majority		5,894	34.27	▼15.97
BN hold		Swing		

Kedah state election, 1995
Party	Candidate	Votes	%	∆%
BN	Saravanan Velia Udayar	10,165	69.35	▲2.94
PAS	Harun Mat Isa	2,800	19.11	▲19.11
DAP	Karuppaiah Ramasamy	1,692	11.54	▲11.54
Total valid votes		14,657	100.00	
Total rejected ballots		374		
Unreturned ballots		0		
Turnout		15,031	71.00	▼3.68
Registered electors		21,169		
Majority		7,365	50.24	▲17.42
BN hold		Swing		

Kedah state election, 1990
Party	Candidate	Votes	%	∆%
BN	Badri Yunus	8,819	66.41	▼5.31
S46	Zainol Abidin Johari	4,460	33.59	▲33.59
Total valid votes		13,279	100.00	
Total rejected ballots		472		
Unreturned ballots		0		
Turnout		13,751	74.68	▲2.99
Registered electors		18,412		
Majority		4,359	32.82	▼10.62
BN hold		Swing		

Kedah state election, 1986
Party	Candidate	Votes	%
BN	Badri Yunus	8,575	71.72
PAS	Ahmad Awang	3,381	28.28
Total valid votes		11,956	100.00
Total rejected ballots		533	
Unreturned ballots		0	
Turnout		12,489	71.69
Registered electors		17,421	
Majority		5,194	43.44
This was a new constituency created.
