= Azizan Hamzah =

Malaysian politician

Yang Berhormat Ustaz Azizan Hamzah AMK BKM MLA
- عزيزان حمزه

Member of the Kedah State Legislative Assembly for Bukit Selambau
- Incumbent
- Assumed office 12 August 2023
- Preceded by: Summugam Rengasamy (PH–PKR)
- Majority: 11,665 (2023)

Personal details
- Party: Malaysian Islamic Party (PAS)
- Other political affiliations: Perikatan Nasional (PN)
- Occupation: Politician

Azizan bin Hamzah is a Malaysian politician. He served as Member of the Kedah State Legislative Assembly (MLA) for Bukit Selambau since August 2023. He is a member of the Malaysian Islamic Party (PAS), a component party of Perikatan Nasional (PN).

== Election results ==
Kedah State Legislative Assembly
Year	Constituency	Candidate	Votes	Pct	Opponent(s)	Votes	Pct	Ballots cast	Majority	Turnout
2023	N25 Bukit Selambau	Azizan Hamzah (PAS)	33,508	60.13%	Summugam Rengasamy (PKR)	21,843	39.20%	56,100	11,665	70.55%
2023	N25 Bukit Selambau	Azizan Hamzah (PAS)	33,508	60.13%	Dinesh Muniandy (IND)	375	0.67%	56,100	11,665	70.55%

== Honours ==
- Kedah
  - Member of the Order of the Crown of Kedah (AMK) (2023)
  - Recipient of the Public Service Star (BKM) (2009)
