= Arumugam Vengatarakoo =

Malaysian politician

Arumugam Vengatarakoo SDK

Member of the Kedah State Executive Council
- In office 2008–2009
- Monarch: Abdul Halim
- Menteri Besar: Azizan Abdul Razak
- Succeeded by: Manikumar Subramaniam
- Constituency: Bukit Selambau

Member of the Kedah State Legislative Assembly for Bukit Selambau
- In office 8 March 2008 – 2009
- Preceded by: Saravanan Velia Udayar (BN–MIC)
- Succeeded by: Manikumar Subramanian (PR–PKR)
- Majority: 2,362 (2008)

Personal details
- Born: 10 November 1954 (age 71) Sungai Petani, Kedah, Federation of Malaya
- Party: People's Justice Party (PKR) (2008–present)
- Other political affiliations: Pakatan Rakyat (PR) (2008–2015); Pakatan Harapan (PH) (2015–present)
- Occupation: Politician

Arumugam s/o Vengatarakoo is a Malaysian politician and who served as Member of the Kedah State Executive Council (EXCO) in the Pakatan Rakyat (PR) state administration under Menteri Besar Azizan Abdul Razak and Member of the Kedah State Legislative Assembly (MLA) for Bukit Selambau from March 2008 to his resignation in February 2009.

Arumugam was elected in the 2008 election as an independent, but immediately joined the People's Justice Party in the new Pakatan Rakyat coalition government of Kedah. He was appointed to the Executive Council to represent Kedah's Indian community in the state government. However, in February 2009, Arumugam resigned from the Executive Council and the State Assembly, triggering a by-election.

Before entering politics, Arumugam was a member of the Royal Malaysian Air Force.

Arumugam has served as Merbok PKR Branch Chief from 2022 to 2025.

== Election results ==
Kedah State Legislative Assembly
Year	Constituency	Candidate	Votes	Pct	Opponent(s)	Votes	Pct	Ballots cast	Majority	Turnout
2008	N25 Bukit Selambau	Arumugam Vengatarakoo (IND)	13,225	54.90%	Krishnan Subramaniam (MIC)	10,863	45.10%	25,798	2,362	73.76%

== Honours ==
- Kedah
  - Companion of the Order of Loyalty to the Royal House of Kedah (SDK) (2009)
