= Summugam Rengasamy =

Malaysian politician

- சண்முகம் ரெங்கசாமி

Member of the Kedah State Executive Council
- In office 1 August 2018 – 17 May 2020
- Monarch: Sallehuddin
- Menteri Besar: Mukhriz Mahathir
- Portfolio: Indian Community Affairs, Unity, Domestic Trade and Consumer Affairs
- Preceded by: Himself (Indian Community Affairs, Unity & Consumer Affairs); Salmee Said (Domestic Trade)
- Succeeded by: Azman Nasruddin (Indian Affairs); Portfolio abolished (Unity, Domestic Trade and Consumer Affairs)
- In office 22 May 2018 – 1 August 2018
- Monarch: Sallehuddin
- Menteri Besar: Mukhriz Mahathir
- Portfolio: Indian Community Affairs, Unity, Consumer Affairs and Co-operatives
- Preceded by: Leong Yong Kong (Indian Community Affairs & Unity); Ku Abdul Rahman Ku Ismail (Consumer Affairs & Cooperatives)
- Succeeded by: Himself (Indian Community Affairs, Unity & Consumer Affairs); Portfolio abolished (Co-operatives)

Member of the Kedah State Legislative Assembly for Bukit Selambau
- In office 9 May 2018 – 12 August 2023
- Preceded by: Krishnamoorthy Rajannaidu (PR–PKR)
- Succeeded by: Azizan Hamzah (PN–PAS)
- Majority: 5,635 (2018)

Faction represented in Kedah State Legislative Assembly
- 2018–2023: Pakatan Harapan

Personal details
- Born: Kedah, Malaysia
- Citizenship: Malaysian
- Party: People's Justice Party (PKR)
- Other political affiliations: Pakatan Harapan (PH)
- Occupation: Politician

Summugam a/l Rengasamy is a Malaysian politician and served as Kedah State Executive Councillor.

== Election results ==
Kedah State Legislative Assembly
Year	Constituency	Candidate	Votes	Pct	Opponent(s)	Votes	Pct	Ballots cast	Majority	Turnout
2018	N25 Bukit Selambau	Summugam Rengasamy (PKR)	17,573	45.11%	Mohd Ali Sulaiman (PAS)	11,938	30.64%	39,589	5,635	81.90%
2018	N25 Bukit Selambau	Summugam Rengasamy (PKR)	17,573	45.11%	Jaspal Singh Gurbakhes Singh (MIC)	9,449	24.25%	39,589	5,635	81.90%
2023	N25 Bukit Selambau	Summugam Rengasamy (PKR)	21,843	39.20%	Azizan Hamzah (PAS)	33,508	60.13%	56,100	11,665	70.55%
2023	N25 Bukit Selambau	Summugam Rengasamy (PKR)	21,843	39.20%	Dinesh Muniandy (IND)	375	0.67%	56,100	11,665	70.55%
