= Mohd Johari Baharum =

Malaysian politician (born 1954)

Yang Hormat Dato' Sri Mohd Johari Baharum SSAP DGMK SIMP DMSM DSDK AMK JP
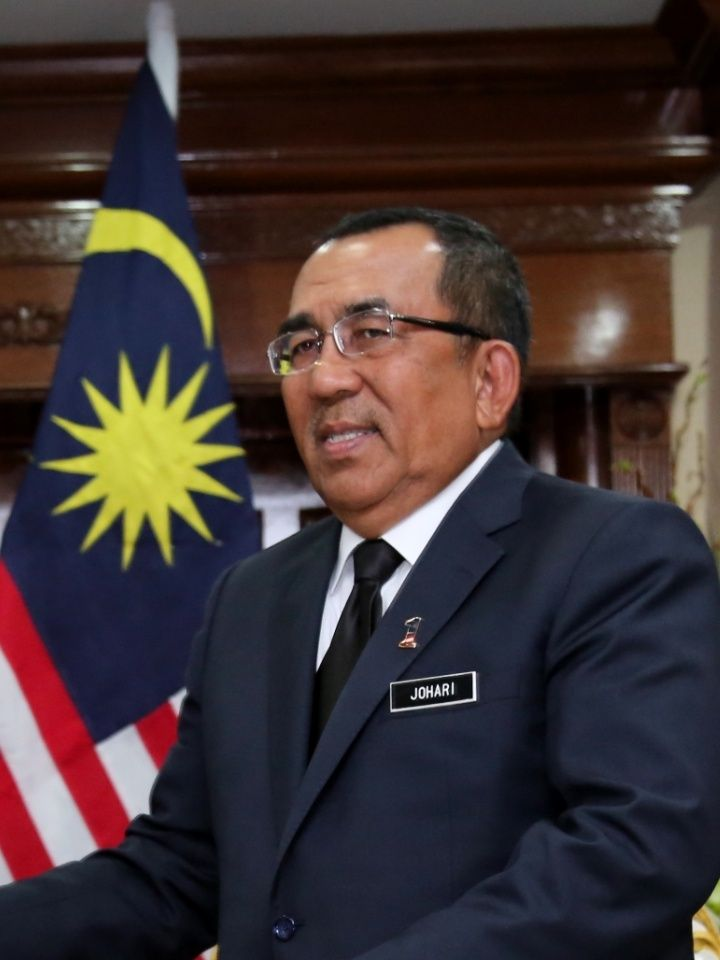

Deputy Minister of Defence
- In office 29 July 2015 – 9 May 2018
- Monarchs: Abdul Halim; Muhammad V
- Prime Minister: Najib Razak
- Minister: Hishammuddin Hussein
- Preceded by: Abdul Rahim Bakri
- Succeeded by: Liew Chin Tong
- Constituency: Kubang Pasu

Deputy Minister of Agriculture and Agro-based Industry I
- In office 10 April 2009 – 15 May 2013 Serving with Rohani Abdul Karim (Deputy Minister of Agriculture and Agro-based Industry II) (2009–2010); Chua Tee Yong (2010–2013)
- Monarchs: Mizan Zainal Abidin; Abdul Halim
- Prime Minister: Najib Razak
- Minister: Noh Omar
- Preceded by: Rohani Abdul Karim
- Succeeded by: Tajuddin Abdul Rahman
- Constituency: Kubang Pasu

Deputy Minister in the Prime Minister's Department
- In office 19 March 2008 – 9 April 2009
- Monarch: Mizan Zainal Abidin
- Prime Minister: Abdullah Ahmad Badawi
- Minister: Mohamed Nazri Abdul Aziz; Ahmad Zahid Hamidi; Amirsham Abdul Aziz; Zaid Ibrahim (2008–2009); Bernard Giluk Dompok
- Constituency: Kubang Pasu

Deputy Minister of Internal Security I
- In office 14 February 2006 – 18 March 2008 Serving with Fu Ah Kiow (Deputy Minister of Internal Security II)
- Monarchs: Sirajuddin; Mizan Zainal Abidin
- Prime Minister: Abdullah Ahmad Badawi
- Minister: Abdullah Ahmad Badawi
- Preceded by: Noh Omar
- Constituency: Kubang Pasu

Parliamentary Secretary in the Prime Minister's Department
- In office 2004 – 14 February 2006
- Monarchs: Sirajuddin; Mizan Zainal Abidin
- Prime Minister: Abdullah Ahmad Badawi
- Minister: Mohamed Nazri Abdul Aziz; Abdullah Md Zin; Mustapa Mohamed; Mohd Radzi Sheikh Ahmad; Maximus Ongkili; Bernard Giluk Dompok
- Deputy Minister: M. Kayveas; Joseph Entulu Belaun
- Constituency: Kubang Pasu

Member of the Malaysian Parliament for Kubang Pasu
- In office 21 March 2004 – 9 May 2018
- Preceded by: Mahathir Mohamad (BN–UMNO)
- Succeeded by: Amiruddin Hamzah (PH–BERSATU)
- Majority: 13,712 (2004); 7,060 (2008); 10,444 (2013)

Faction represented in Dewan Rakyat
- 2004–2018: Barisan Nasional

Personal details
- Born: Mohd Johari bin Baharum; 13 April 1954 (age 72) Johor, Federation of Malaya (now Malaysia)
- Citizenship: Malaysian
- Party: United Malays National Organisation (UMNO)
- Other political affiliations: Barisan Nasional (BN); Perikatan Nasional (PN); Muafakat Nasional (MN)
- Spouse: Marziah Mohd. Hashim
- Children: 4
- Occupation: Politician

Mohd Johari bin Baharum (born 13 April 1954) is a Malaysian politician and was a three-term Member of the Parliament of Malaysia for the Kubang Pasu constituency in Kedah, Malaysia from 2004 to 2018. He was elected to Parliament at the 2004 election, replacing former fourth Prime Minister Mahathir Mohamad, who was retiring then. Mohd Johari is a member of United Malays National Organisation (UMNO) party, a component party of the previous governing Barisan Nasional coalition.

In the 2018 election, Johari lost to Amiruddin Hamzah, of the Malaysian United Indigenous Party (PPBM), in a three-corner fight with Norhafiza Fadzil of Pan-Malaysian Islamic Party (PAS) for the Kubang Pasu parliamentary seat.

Until 2018 election before the downfall of BN as the ruling federal government and his failure in retaining his parliamentary seat, he was a deputy minister in the federal Cabinet.

== Election results ==
Parliament of Malaysia
Year	Constituency	Candidate	Votes	Pct	Opponent(s)	Votes	Pct	Ballots cast	Majority	Turnout
2004	P006 Kubang Pasu	Mohd Johari Baharum (UMNO)	26,657	67.31%	Abd Isa Ismail (PAS)	12,945	32.69%	40,602	13,712	81.87%
2008	P006 Kubang Pasu	Mohd Johari Baharum (UMNO)	24,179	58.55%	Abd Isa Ismail (PAS)	17,119	41.45%	42,353	7,060	79.43%
2013	P006 Kubang Pasu	Mohd Johari Baharum (UMNO)	33,334	59.29%	Mohd Jamal Nasir (PAS)	22,890	40.71%	57,296	10,444	87.41%
2018	P006 Kubang Pasu	Mohd Johari Baharum (UMNO)	16,975	28.14%	Amiruddin Hamzah (BERSATU)	29,984	49.70%	61,452	13,009	83.18%
2018	P006 Kubang Pasu	Mohd Johari Baharum (UMNO)	16,975	28.14%	Norhafiza Fadzil (PAS)	13,375	22.17%	61,452	13,009	83.18%

== Honours ==
- Kedah
  - Knight Commander of the Glorious Order of the Crown of Kedah (DGMK) – Dato' Wira (2008)
  - Knight Companion of the Order of Loyalty to the Royal House of Kedah (DSDK) – Dato' (2006)
  - Member of the Order of the Crown of Kedah (AMK) (1998)
- Malacca
  - Companion Class I of the Exalted Order of Malacca (DMSM) – Datuk (2001)
  - Jusitice of the Peace (JP) (2000)
- Pahang
  - Knight Grand Companion of the Order of Sultan Ahmad Shah of Pahang (SSAP) – Dato' Sri (2015)
  - Knight Grand Companion of the Order of the Crown of Pahang (SIMP) – formerly Dato', now Dato' Indera (2007)
