= Krishnamoorthy Rajannaidu =

Malaysian politician

- கிருஷ்ணமூர்த்தி

Member of the Kedah State Legislative Assembly for Bukit Selambau
- In office 5 May 2013 – 9 May 2018
- Preceded by: Manikumar Subramanian (PR–PKR)
- Succeeded by: Summugam Rengasamy (PH–PKR)
- Majority: 530 (2013)

Personal details
- Party: People's Justice Party (PKR) (–2020); Malaysian United Indigenous Party (BERSATU) (2020–present)
- Other political affiliations: Pakatan Rakyat (PR) (2008–2015); Pakatan Harapan (PH) (2015–2020)
- Education: University of Pondicherry (MBBCh)
- Occupation: Politician; Doctor

Krishnamoorthy s/o Rajannaidu (Tamil: கிருஷ்ணமூர்த்தி) is a Malaysian politician. He is the elected representatives the seat of Bukit Selambau in the Kedah State Legislative Assembly. Krishnamoorty is a Doctor in professional.

Krishnamoorthy joined BERSATU in 2020.

== Election results ==
Kedah State Legislative Assembly
Year	Constituency	Candidate	Votes	Pct	Opponent(s)	Votes	Pct	Ballots cast	Majority	Turnout
2013	N25 Bukit Selambau	Krishnamoorthy Rajannaidu (PKR)	20,091	48.93%	Maran Mutaya (MIC)	19,561	47.64%	42,023	530	85.61%
2013	N25 Bukit Selambau	Krishnamoorthy Rajannaidu (PKR)	20,091	48.93%	Syed Omar Syed Mahmud (IND)	936	2.28%	42,023	530	85.61%
2013	N25 Bukit Selambau	Krishnamoorthy Rajannaidu (PKR)	20,091	48.93%	Kamal Naser Thow Beek (KITA)	388	0.94%	42,023	530	85.61%
2013	N25 Bukit Selambau	Krishnamoorthy Rajannaidu (PKR)	20,091	48.93%	S.Thivagaran (IND)	83	0.20%	42,023	530	85.61%
