= 2013 Sungai Limau by-election =

Election in Malaysia

- 4 November 2013

Sungai Limau seat in the Kedah State Legislative Assembly
	PAS	BN
Candidate	Mohd Azam Samat	Sohaimi Lazim
Party	PAS	BN (UMNO)
Alliance	PR
Popular vote	12,069	10,985
Percentage	52.35%	47.65%
Sungai Limau assemblyman before election
Azizan Abdul Razak
PAS
Elected Sungai Limau assemblyman
Mohd Azam Samat
PAS

A by-election was held for the Kedah State Assembly seat of Sungai Limau on 4 November 2013 with nomination day on 23 October 2013. The seat was vacated after the death of the incumbent five-term assemblyman and former Menteri Besar of Kedah, Azizan Abdul Razak on 26 September 2013 from heart complications. Tan Sri Azizan was an assemblyman from the Pan-Malaysian Islamic Party and the first PAS Menteri Besar of Kedah.

On 21 October, Barisan Nasional made announcement that Dr Ahmad Sohaimi Lazim, lecturer in Sultan Idris University of Education has been named as BN candidate while PAS named Jerai PAS Youth chief Mohd Azam Samad as PAS candidate. The election was seen as a sort of referendum on current BN Menteri Besar of Kedah, Mukhriz Mahathir who failed in his bid to be elected as UMNO vice-president in the UMNO polls on 19 October 2013.

The by election was won by Mohd Azam Samad with a reduced majority of 1,084 votes.

== Results ==
Kedah state by-election, 4 November 2013: Sungai Limau The by-election was called due to the death of incumbent, Azizan Abdul Razak.
Party	Candidate	Votes	%	∆%
PAS	Mohd Azam Samat	12,069	52.35	
BN	Sohaimi Lazim	10,985	47.65	
Total valid votes		23,054	100.00	
Total rejected ballots		145		
Unreturned ballots		6		
Turnout		23,205	85.24	
Registered electors		27,222		
Majority		1,084		
PAS hold		Swing		
Source(s) "Pilihan Raya Kecil N.20 Sungai Limau". Election Commission of Malaysia. "Federal Government Gazette - Notice of Contested Election - By-election of the State Legislative Assembly of N.20 Sungai Limau for the State of Kedah [P.U. (B) 425/2013]" (PDF). Attorney General's Chambers of Malaysia. 25 October 2013. "Federal Government Gazette - Results of Contested Election and Statement of the Poll after the Official Addition of Votes for the By-election of N.20 Sungai Limau [P.U. (B) 448/2013]" (PDF). Attorney General's Chambers of Malaysia. 11 November 2013.
