= Muhammad Sanusi Md Nor =

Malaysian politician

Yang Amat Berhormat Dato' Seri Haji Muhammad Sanusi Md Nor SPMK MLA
- محمد سنوسي مد نور
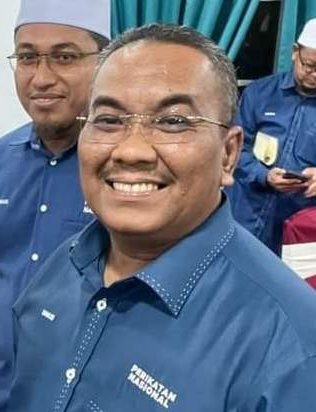
- Muhammad Sanusi in 2023

14th Menteri Besar of Kedah
- Incumbent
- Assumed office 17 May 2020
- Monarch: Sallehuddin
- Preceded by: Mukhriz Mahathir
- Constituency: Jeneri

State Leader of the Opposition of Kedah
- In office 4 July 2018 – 17 May 2020
- Monarch: Sallehuddin
- Menteri Besar: Mukhriz Mahathir
- Preceded by: Amiruddin Hamzah
- Succeeded by: Phahrolrazi Mohd Zawawi
- Constituency: Jeneri

Member of the Kedah State Legislative Assembly for Jeneri
- Incumbent
- Assumed office 9 May 2018
- Preceded by: Mahadzir Abdul Hamid (BN–UMNO)
- Majority: 2,455 (2018); 16,050 (2023)

Personal details
- Born: 4 August 1974 (age 52) Kampung Sungai Pauh, Sik, Kedah, Malaysia
- Citizenship: Malaysian
- Party: Malaysian Islamic Party (PAS)
- Other political affiliations: Pakatan Rakyat (PR) (2008–2015); Gagasan Sejahtera (GS) (2016–2020); Perikatan Nasional (PN) (2020–present)
- Spouse(s): Jusmalailani Jusoh (m. 1999) Che Intan Subri (m. 2024)
- Children: 5
- Education: University of Science Malaysia (BA)
- Occupation: Politician

Military service
- Allegiance: Malaysia; Yang di-Pertuan Agong
- Branch/service: Royal Malaysian Navy; Territorial Army Regiment
- Years of service: 1995–1997 (Note: Underwent training as reserve officer during his studies at USM.); 2021–present (Note: Awarded as an honorary one-star general by TLDM.)
- Rank: Sub Lieutenant First Admiral (Note: Honorary rank.)
- Unit: Reserve Officer Training Unit
- Muhammad Sanusi Md Nor on Facebook

Muhammad Sanusi bin Md Nor (Jawi: محمد سنوسي بن مد نور; Malay pronunciation: [muhammad sanusi]; born 4 August 1974) is a Malaysian politician who has served as the 14th Menteri Besar of Kedah since May 2020 and Member of the Kedah State Legislative Assembly (MLA) for Jeneri since May 2018. He was the Leader of the Opposition of the state from July 2018 to May 2020.

His tenure as Menteri Besar of Kedah has been characterised by a series of political gaffes and scandals, as well as strained relationships with the federal government and other state governments in Malaysia. A member of the Malaysian Islamic Party (PAS), he has been perceived as one of the key figures in the "Green Wave" phenomena.

== Early life and education ==
Muhammad Sanusi was born in Kampung Sungai Pauh, Sik, Kedah, Malaysia and he is the seventh child among 13 siblings from the marriage of Md Nor Taib (born 1942) and Meriam Ahmad (1949–15 August 2024). He came from a poor family.

Muhammad Sanusi received his primary education at Sekolah Rendah Batu 5, Sik and later his secondary education at Sekolah Menengah Sains Sultan Mohamad Jiwa, Sungai Petani, Kedah, Sekolah Menengah Kebangsaan Sik, Sik, Kedah and Sekolah Menengah Kebangsaan Derma, Kangar, Perlis. He was expelled from school twice, once from SMS Sultan Mohamad Jiwa and also at Sekolah Menengah Kebangsaan Sik, because of his bad behaviour and his parents being unable to settle the payment for his school's annual fee. He was easily bullied by fellow schoolmates due to his poor socio-economic background. He continued his education to Universiti Sains Malaysia in Penang after having completed his Malaysian Higher School Certificate (STPM) at Sekolah Menengah Kebangsaan Derma. He received his Bachelor of Political Science in Social Science from Universiti Sains Malaysia (USM), Gelugor, Penang. During his university years, he underwent the training as navy reserve officer cadet and was commissioned in 1997.

== Early career ==
Muhammad Sanusi began his career as an education officer for Persatuan Pengguna Pulau Pinang (CAP) (1998–2002), executive secretary for Institut Pemikiran dan Kepimpinan Melayu (IMPAK) (2002–2004) and assessment executive for Jurunilai Bersekutu (M) Sdn Bhd (2004–2008). He also served as board member for Syarikat Air Darul Aman (SADA) since 2010 until 2013.

== Political career ==
During his political career, Muhammad Sanusi served as PAS election director, chairman of PASRelief, central director-general of PAS Security (since 2017), PAS divisional commissioner of Sik, Kedah (since 2015), Kedah PAS deputy commissioner (since 2015), Political Secretary to 10th Menteri Besar of Kedah YAB Tan Sri Dato' Seri Diraja Ustaz Haji Azizan Abdul Razak (2008 to 2013). He also served as election director of PN since 2023.

Muhammad Sanusi won the highest number of votes in the Central Working Committee (AJK) members election with 1,098 votes in the PAS party election 2023.

== Menteri Besar of Kedah ==
Muhammad Sanusi served as 14th Menteri Besar of Kedah since 2020. On 17 May 2020, Mukhriz Mahathir resigned as Menteri Besar of Kedah mentioning he couldn't hold on to majority among his state assemblymen and thus relinquished his position. Sanusi sworn in before the Sultan of Kedah, Sallehuddin on 17 May 2020.

During his tenure as the Menteri Besar of Kedah, he oversees many development and achievement in Kedah, including earned RM68.3 billion in 2021 and RM7.34 billion from investment in 2022; upgraded six Water Treatment Plants (Malay: Loji Rawatan Air or LRA) includes LRA Lubuk Buntar, LRA Bukit Selambau, LRA Sungai Limau, LRA Baling, LRA Jenun Baru and LRA Pelubang; 5,417 land title grants have been given to applicants who have been applying for decades; Kedah Rubber City (KRC) which has been in disrepair for a long time will be developed in the PN era with a total of RM2.2 billion and many more.

== Involvement in navy ==
Muhammad Sanusi became the first politician in Malaysia to receive the military ranks of First Admiral in 2021 from the Royal Malaysian Navy (TLDM).

== Controversies and issues ==
Muhammad Sanusi courted many controversies during his term as the Menteri Besar of Kedah since 2020 that have made him a polarizing figure in Malaysia. This includes rare-earth metal (REE) deposits, threats to cut Penang's water supply, accusations of racism, his comments on the Thaipusam holiday in Kedah, a COVID-19 corpse joke, an obscene speech in Penang, accusations of revanchism in relation to Penang, and controversial remarks about the appointment of the Menteri Besar of Selangor by the state's Sultan.

== Personal life ==
Sanusi married his first wife, a school teacher, in February 1999. In 2024, he confirmed that he had taken a second wife, a policewoman. He has five children by his first wife.

Sanusi currently resides in Seri Mentaloon, Alor Setar, Kedah. (Note: The official residence of the Menteri Besar of Kedah.)

In 2023, he released his own biography book, titled Pegunan Perjalanan Hidup: Dinding Sekeping Adik Seorang, and this book was launched by President of the Malaysian Islamic Party (PAS), Abdul Hadi Awang.

== Election results ==
Kedah State Legislative Assembly
Year	Constituency	Candidate	Votes	Pct	Opponent(s)	Votes	Pct	Ballots cast	Majority	Turnout
2008	N23 Belantek	Muhammad Sanusi Md Nor (PAS)	7,974	49.20%	Mohd Tajuddin Abdullah (UMNO)	8,226	50.70%	16,475	252	86.60%
2018	N24 Jeneri	Muhammad Sanusi Md Nor (PAS)	10,626	46.32%	Mahadzir Abdul Hamid (UMNO)	8,171	35.61%	27,641	2,455	84.70%
2018	N24 Jeneri	Muhammad Sanusi Md Nor (PAS)	10,626	46.32%	Mohd Nazri Abu Hassan (BERSATU)	4,146	18.07%	27,641	2,455	84.70%
2023	N24 Jeneri	Muhammad Sanusi Md Nor (PAS)	21,823	79.08%	Muhamad Khizri Abu Kassim (UMNO)	5,773	20.92%	27,754	16,050	79.08%

== Honours ==
- Kedah
  - Knight Grand Commander of the Order of the Crown of Kedah (SPMK) – Dato' Seri (2021)
  - Member of the Order of the Crown of Kedah (AMK) (2010)

== Bibliography ==
=== Book ===
- Pegunan Perjalanan Hidup: Dinding Sekeping Adik Seorang (2023)

== See also ==
- Kedah Football Association
- Kedah FA state football team

== Notes ==
Government offices
Preceded by Mukhriz Mahathir	Chief Minister of Kedah; 2020–present	Incumbent
