= Zulkiple Kassim =

26th Chief of Army (Malaysia)

Yang Berbahagia General (Rtd) Tan Sri Dato' Seri Zulkiple Kassim PGAT PSM PJN SPMS SSAP DPPN SPTS DCSM PSAT DGMK DPKK DSAP DIMP DSMZ DPMK PMW PAT JSM SMZ SDK KMN AMT AMP PPS PPA PJM PKN
- ذوالكفل كسسيم
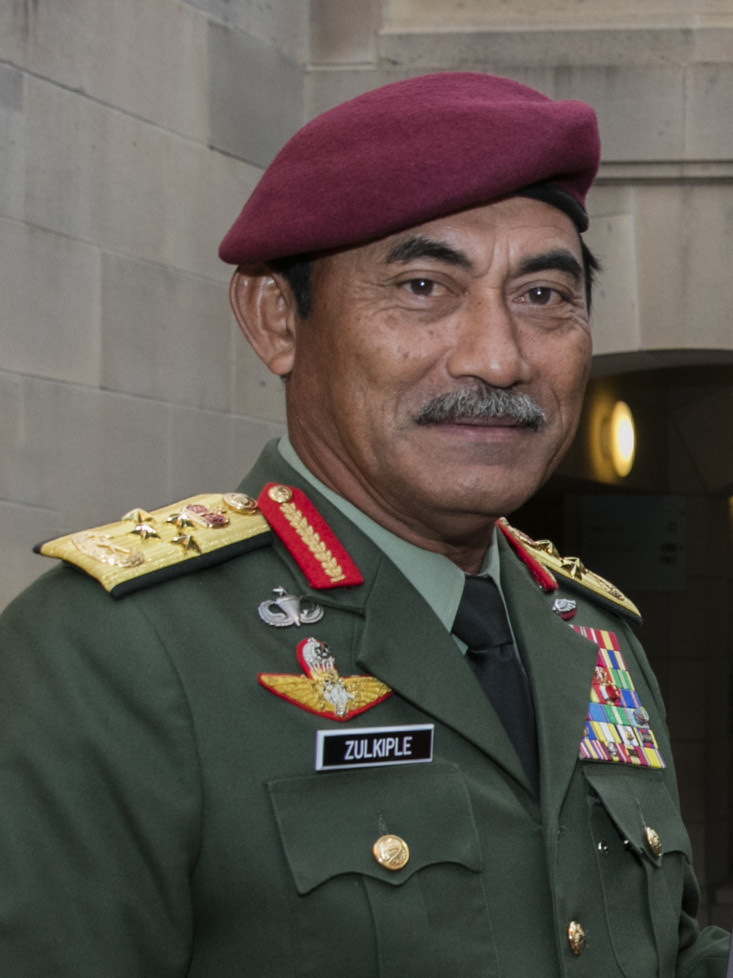
- Zulkiple in 2018

26th Chief of Army
- In office 17 December 2016 – 2 September 2018
- Monarch: Muhammad V
- Prime Minister: Najib Razak (2016–2018); Mahathir Mohamad (2018)
- Minister of Defence: Hishamuddin Hussein (2016–2018); Mohamad Sabu (2018)
- Preceded by: Raja Mohamed Affandi
- Succeeded by: Ahmad Hasbullah Mohd Nawawi

Personal details
- Born: 24 February 1959 (age 67) Gong Kapas, Kuala Terengganu, Terengganu, Federation of Malaya (now Malaysia)
- Spouse: Zaleha Md Yusof
- Children: 5
- Education: Royal Military Academy Sandhurst; Universiti Utara Malaysia

Military service
- Allegiance: Malaysia
- Branch/service: Malaysian Army
- Years of service: 1977–2018
- Rank: General
- Battles/wars: Communist insurgency in Malaysia (1968–89); Operation Daulat

Zulkiple bin Haji Kassim (Jawi: ذوالكفل بن حاج كسسيم; born 24 February 1959), is a Malaysian retired military officer who served as the 26th Chief of Malaysian Army from December 2016 to September 2018.

== Early life and education ==
Zulkiple was born on 24 February 1959 in Gong Kapas, Kuala Terengganu. In 1977, he attend the Officer Cadet Course at Royal Military Academy Sandhurst and he completed the course in 1978. He also graduated on Master of Science in Management from Universiti Utara Malaysia.

== Career ==
=== Military career ===
Zulkiple was commissioned to Second lieutenant on 7 April 1978 and posted as officer in 6th Battalion, Royal Malay Regiment. Throughout his military career, he has served in various positions. Some positions including as Trainer at the Junior Officer Combat Training Centre in 1982, Assistant Commanding Officer of the 9th Battalion of the Royal Malay Regiment (Para) in 1994, Commanding Officer of the 17th Battalion of the Royal Malay Regiment (Para) in 1994, Military Assistant to the Minister of Defence in 1998, Commanding Officer of the 10th Battalion of the Royal Malay Regiment in Johor Bahru in 2000, Director of Infantry in 2001, Commander of the 4th Brigade (Mechanised) in 2003, Director of the Department of Veterans Affairs in 2005, Commander of the 4th Infantry Division in 2007 and Commander of the Army Western Field Command in 2011.

Zulkiple was appointed 26th Chief of Army on 17 December 2016 following appointment of his predecessor Raja Mohamed Affandi as the 19th Chief of Defence Forces. The position he held until his retirement on 2 September 2018 and succeeded by Ahmad Hasbullah Mohd Nawawi.

=== Post-military career ===
Zulkiple Kassim is currently the Chairman of PH Empire Holdings Berhad.

== Personal life ==
Zulkiple was married with Zaleha binti Md Yusof and blessed with three sons and two daughters. He likes playing golf and soccer in spare time.

== Honours ==
- Malaysia
  - Commander of the Order of Loyalty to the Crown of Malaysia (PSM) – Tan Sri (2017)
  - Commander of the Order of Meritorious Service (PJN) – Datuk (2012)
  - Companion of the Order of Loyalty to the Crown of Malaysia (JSM) (2005)
  - Officer of the Order of the Defender of the Realm (KMN) (1999)
  - Recipient of the Loyal Service Medal (PPS)
  - Recipient of the General Service Medal (PPA)
  - Recipient of the National Sovereignty Medal (PKN)
  - Recipient of the 14th Yang di-Pertuan Agong Installation Medal
- Malaysian Armed Forces
  - Courageous Commander of the Most Gallant Order of Military Service (PGAT) (2017)
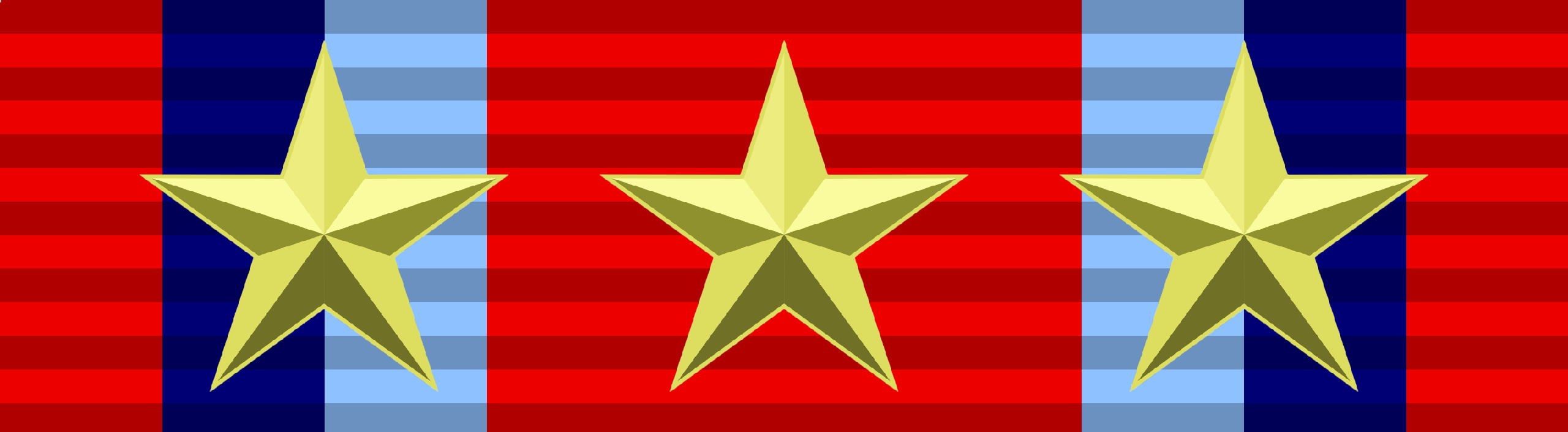
  - Loyal Commander of the Most Gallant Order of Military Service (PSAT)
  - Warrior of the Most Gallant Order of Military Service (PAT)
  - Recipient of the Malaysian Service Medal (PJM)
- Federal Territory (Malaysia)
  - Commander of the Order of the Territorial Crown (PMW) – Datuk (2010)
- Kedah
  - Knight Commander of the Glorious Order of the Crown of Kedah (DGMK) – Dato' Wira (2013)
  - Knight Commander of the Order of the Crown of Kedah (DPMK) – Dato' (2009)
  - Companion of the Order of Loyalty to the Royal House of Kedah (SDK) (2002)
- Kelantan
  - Knight Commander of the Order of the Noble Crown of Kelantan (DPKK) – Dato' (2012)
- Malacca
  - Knight Commander of the Exalted Order of Malacca (DCSM) – Datuk Wira (2017)
- Pahang
  - Grand Knight of the Order of Sultan Ahmad Shah of Pahang (SSAP) – Dato' Sri (2012)
  - Knight Companion of the Order of Sultan Ahmad Shah of Pahang (DSAP) – Dato' (2005)
  - Knight Companion of the Order of the Crown of Pahang (DIMP) – Dato' (2004)
  - Member of the Order of the Crown of Pahang (AMP)
- Penang
  - Knight Commander of the Order of the Defender of State (DPPN) – Dato' Seri (2017)
- Perak
  - Knight Grand Commander of the Order of Taming Sari (SPTS) – Dato' Seri Panglima (2017)
- Selangor
  - Knight Grand Commander of the Order of the Crown of Selangor (SPMS) – Dato' Seri (2017)
- Terengganu
  - Knight Companion of the Order of Sultan Mizan Zainal Abidin of Terengganu (DSMZ) – Dato' (2012)
  - Companion of the Order of Sultan Mizan Zainal Abidin of Terengganu (SMZ) (2003)
  - Member of the Order of the Crown of Terengganu (AMT)
