= 2009 Bukit Selambau by-election =

Election in Malaysia

- 7 April 2009

Bukit Selambau seat in the Kedah State Legislative Assembly
	PKR	BN
Candidate	S. Manikumar	S. Ganesan
Party	PKR	BN (MIC)
Alliance	Pakatan Rakyat
Popular vote	12,632	10,229
Percentage	52.23%	42.31%
Bukit Selambau assemblyman before election
Arumugam Vengatarakoo
PKR
Elected Bukit Selambau assemblyman
S. Manikumar
PKR

A by-election was held for the Kedah State Legislative Assembly seat of Bukit Selambau on 7 April 2009 following the nomination day on 30 March 2009. The by-election was held on the same day as the Batang Ai state seat by-election and the Bukit Gantang federal seat by-election.

== Background ==
The seat was vacated after the incumbent assemblyman and State EXCO, Arumugam Vengatarakoo resigned of both his positions on 9 February 2009. Arumugam was an assemblyman from the Parti Keadilan Rakyat (PKR), a component party of Pakatan Rakyat. He won the seat, then as an independent, by a majority of 2,362 votes against Barisan Nasional (BN) candidate, S. Krishnan in the 2008 Kedah state election. He later joined PKR after his victory, and were the party's state deputy chairman and Merbok PKR deputy chief at the time of his resignation as an MLA. Arumugam has alleged that his resignation were the result of harassment towards him and his family to leave PKR by BN, an allegation that were refuted by BN.

Election Commission of Malaysia announced on 13 February 2009 that the by-election for both this seat and Bukit Gantang federal seat in Perak will be held on 7 April 2009, with 29 March 2009 set as the nomination day.

== Candidates ==
S. Manikumar of PKR has been nominated as Pakatan Rakyat candidate in the by-election. BN, which forms the opposition in the Kedah Assembly, named S. Ganesan from MIC as their candidate. 13 other independent candidates were registered on nomination day, making this election one on the most number of candidates contesting ever recorded in Malaysia election history (15).

== Results ==
The by-election was won by Manikumar from PKR with a majority of 2,403 votes.

Kedah state by-election, 7 April 2009: Bukit Selambau Upon the resignation of incumbent, V. Arumugam
Party	Candidate	Votes	%	∆%
PKR	Manikumar Subramanian	12,632	52.23	▲52.23
BN	Ganesan Subramaniam	10,229	42.31	▼2.79
Independent	Anuar Abdul Hamid	528	2.18	▲2.18
Independent	Husaini Yaacob	257	1.06	▲1.06
Independent	Mohd Fazil Abdul Wahab	83	0.34	▲0.34
Independent	Tan Hock Huat	78	0.32	▲0.32
Independent	T Chandrarajan Thanasagaran	73	0.30	▲0.30
Independent	Abdul Rahim Abu	60	0.25	▲0.25
Independent	Sarala Loganathan	49	0.20	▲0.20
Independent	Moganakumar Subramaniam	46	0.19	▲0.19
Independent	Jayagopal Adaikkalam	35	0.14	▲0.14
Independent	Venason Micheal	32	0.13	▲0.13
Independent	Loganathan Ramachandran	31	0.13	▲0.13
Independent	Khamis Awang	29	0.12	▲0.12
Independent	Radzi Md Lazim	25	0.10	▲0.10
Total valid votes		24,187	100.00	
Total rejected ballots		415		
Unreturned ballots		9		
Turnout		24,611	70.04	
Registered electors		35,140		
Majority		2,403		
PKR hold		Swing		
Source(s) "Pilihan Raya Kecil N.25 Bukit Selambau". Election Commission of Malaysia.
