= Abdul Ghafar Saad =

Malaysian politician

Yang Berhormat Tuan Abdul Ghafar Saad MLA
- عبدالغفار سعاد

Member of the Kedah State Legislative Assembly for Guar Chempedak
- Incumbent
- Assumed office 12 August 2023
- Preceded by: Ku Abdul Rahman Ku Ismail (BN–UMNO)
- Majority: 12,109 (2023)

Personal details
- Citizenship: Malaysia
- Party: Malaysian United Indigenous Party (BERSATU)
- Other political affiliations: Perikatan Nasional (PN)
- Occupation: Politician

Abdul Ghafar bin Saad is a Malaysian politician who has served as Member of the Kedah State Legislative Assembly (MLA) for Guar Chempedak since August 2023. He is a member of the Malaysian United Indigenous Party (BERSATU), a component party of the Perikatan Nasional (PN) coalition.

== Election results ==
Kedah State Legislative Assembly
Year	Constituency	Candidate	Votes	Pct	Opponent(s)	Votes	Pct	Ballots cast	Majority	Turnout
2023	N21 Guar Chempedak	Abdul Ghafar Saad (BERSATU)	17,266	76.40%	Abdul Paris Abdul Hamid (UMNO)	5,157	22.82%	22,755	12,109	75.64%
2023	N21 Guar Chempedak	Abdul Ghafar Saad (BERSATU)	17,266	76.40%	Ku Abdul Halim Ku Ismail (IND)	176	0.78%	22,755	12,109	75.64%
