= Ahmad Hasbullah Mohd Nawawi =

27th Chief of Army (Malaysia)

Yang Berbahagia General (Rtd) Tan Sri Dato' Seri Panglima Ahmad Hasbullah PGAT PSM PJN SPTS DCSM PSAT DGMK DPMS DSAP DMPN DPMK PAT JSM KAT KMN AMK PPS PPA PJM
- أحمد حسبوالله
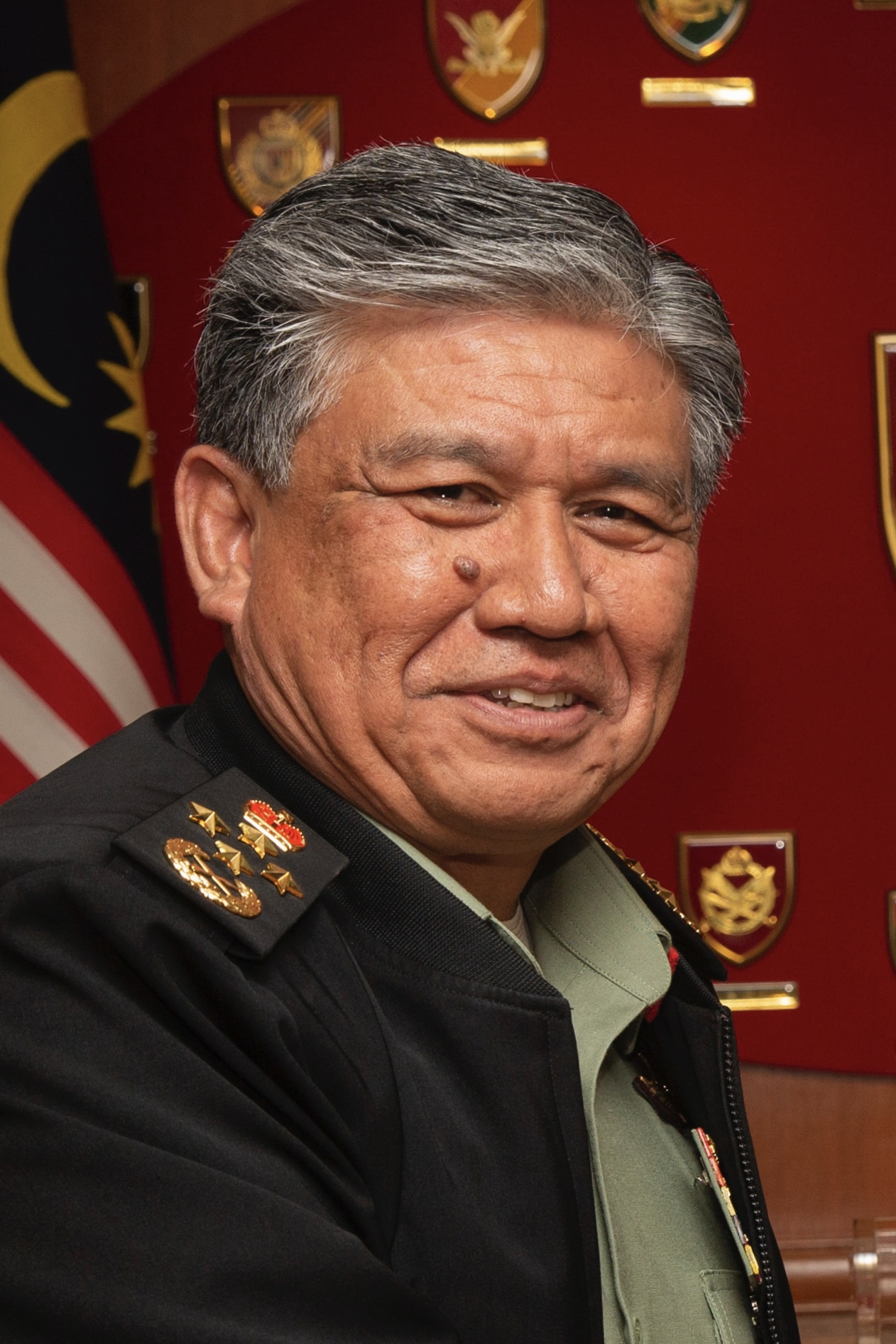
- Ahmad Hasbullah in 2019

27th Chief of Army
- In office 3 September 2018 – 10 June 2020
- Minister: Mohamad Sabu; Ismail Sabri Yaakob
- Preceded by: Zulkiple Kassim
- Succeeded by: Zamrose Mohd Zain

Personal details
- Born: 10 November 1960 (age 65) Kuala Kangsar, Perak, Federation of Malaya (now Malaysia)

Military service
- Allegiance: Malaysia
- Branch/service: Malaysian Army
- Years of service: 1981–2020
- Rank: General
- Unit: Royal Malay Regiment
- Battles/wars: Communist insurgency in Malaysia (1968–1989)

General Ahmad Hasbullah Mohd Nawawi (born 10 November 1960 in Kuala Kangsar, Perak) is a Malaysian General who served as 27th Chief of Malaysian Army.

== Army career ==
After graduating from high school, Ahmad Hasbullah applied to follow Cadet Officer training and was selected to follow the 37th Short Term Commissioned Cadet Training (TJP 37) at the Officer Cadet School, Port Dickson before being selected to continue training at the Officers' Cadet School, Portsea, Australia. He was commissioned into the Royal Malay Regiment on 11 December 1981. In addition, Ahmad Hasbullah had been the Director of Education of the Malaysian Armed Forces for three years starting on 1 April 2001. On 1 August 2011, he was appointed Deputy Chief of Army. Ahmad Hasbullah was appointed Chief of Army on 3 September 2018, succeeding Zulkiple Kassim.

== Honours ==
- Malaysia
  - Commander of the Order of Loyalty to the Crown of Malaysia (PSM) – Tan Sri (2019)
  - Commander of the Order of Meritorious Service (PJN) – Datuk (2011)
  - Companion of the Order of Loyalty to the Crown of Malaysia (JSM) (2006)
  - Officer of the Order of the Defender of the Realm (KMN) (2003)
  - Recipient of the Loyal Service Medal (PPS)
  - Recipient of the General Service Medal (PPA)
- Malaysian Armed Forces
  - Courageous Commander of the Most Gallant Order of Military Service (PGAT) (2019)
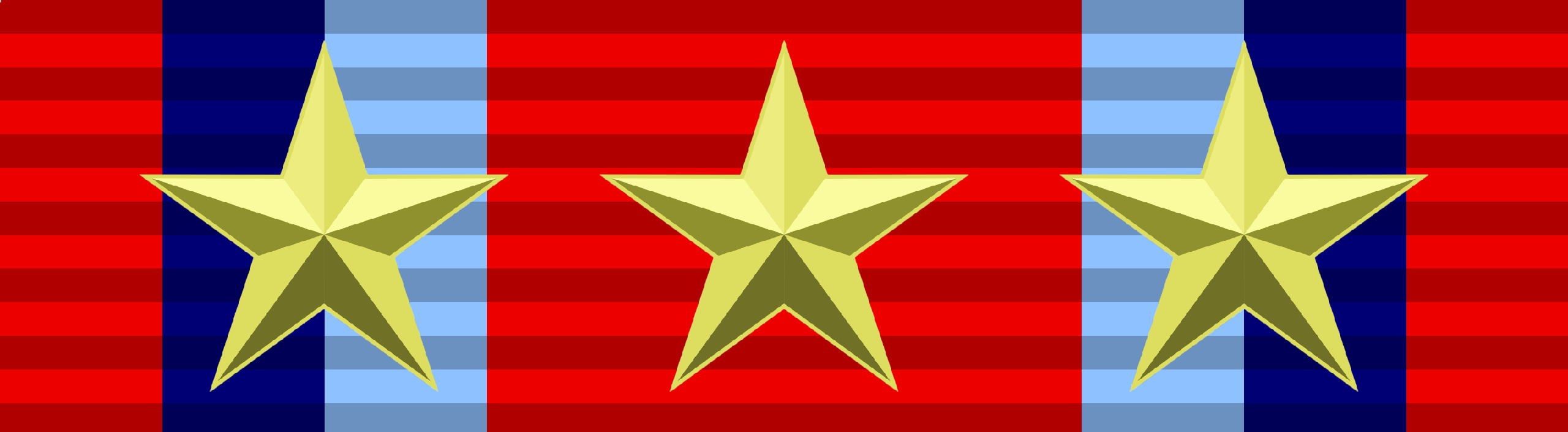
  - Loyal Commander of the Most Gallant Order of Military Service (PSAT)
  - Warrior of the Most Gallant Order of Military Service (PAT) (2004)
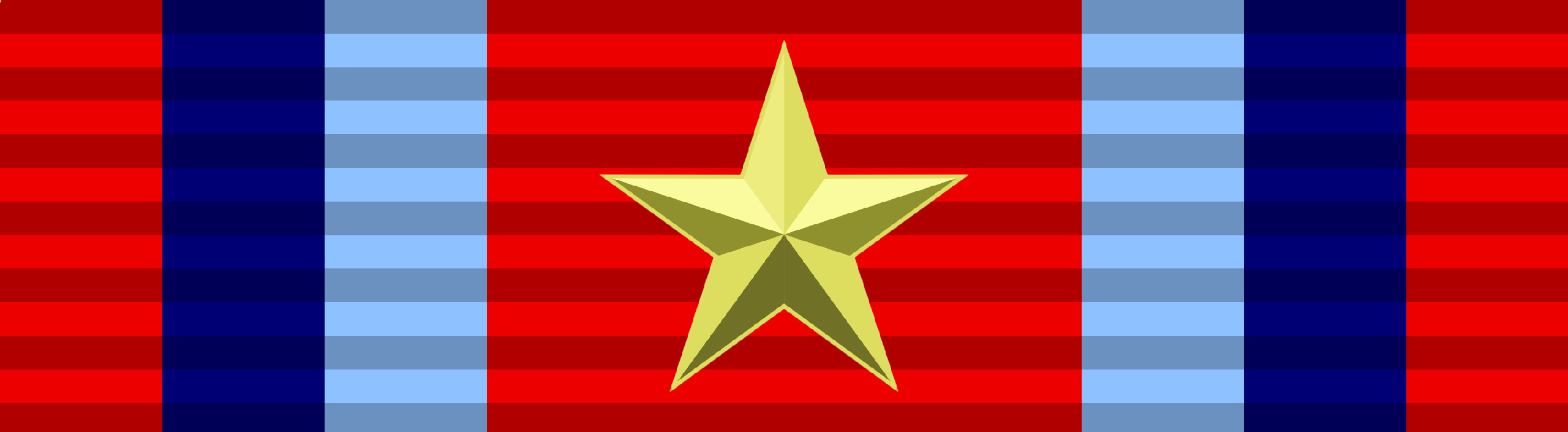
  - Officer of the Most Gallant Order of Military Service (KAT) (1996)
  - Recipient of the Malaysian Service Medal (PJM)
- Kedah
  - Knight Commander of the Glorious Order of the Crown of Kedah (DGMK) – Dato' Wira (2012)
  - Knight Commander of the Order of the Crown of Kedah (DPMK) – Dato' (2010)
  - Member of the Order of the Crown of Kedah (AMK)
- Malacca
  - Knight Commander of the Exalted Order of Malacca (DCSM) – Datuk Wira (2009)
- Pahang
  - Knight Companion of the Order of Sultan Ahmad Shah of Pahang (DSAP) – Dato' (2008)
- Penang
  - Companion of the Order of the Defender of State (DMPN) – Dato' (2013)
- Perak
  - Knight Grand Commander of the Order of Taming Sari (SPTS) – Dato' Seri Panglima (2010)
  - Recipient of the Sultan Nazrin Shah Installation Medal (2015)
- Selangor
  - Knight Commander of the Order of the Crown of Selangor (DPMS) – Dato' (2005)
