= Ahmad Lebai Sudin =

Malaysian politician

Yang Berbahagia Dato' Ahmad Lebai Sudin DSDK JP
- أحمد لباي سودين

Member of the Kedah State Legislative Assembly for Bukit Lada
- In office 5 May 2013 – 9 May 2018
- Preceded by: Ahmad Izzat bin Mohamad Shauki
- Majority: 1,324
- In office 25 April 1995 – 29 November 1999
- Preceded by: New constituency
- Succeeded by: Sheikh Ismail Kamis
- Majority: 1,988

Personal details
- Born: Ahmad bin Lebai Sudin; 11 November 1958 (age 67) Kampung Panchor, Pokok Sena, Kedah, Federation of Malaya (now Malaysia)
- Citizenship: Malaysian
- Party: United Malays National Organisation (UMNO)
- Other political affiliations: Barisan Nasional (BN); Perikatan Nasional (PN); Muafakat Nasional (MN)
- Education: University of Malaya
- Occupation: Politician
- Website: Facebook

Ahmad bin Lebai Sudin (born 11 November 1958) is a Malaysian politician who has served as the Bukit Lada (N9) assemblyman in the Kedah State Legislative Assembly. Ahmad is a member of the United Malays National Organisation (UMNO) in Malaysia's ruling Barisan Nasional coalition. He holds degree with Honors in Sociology and Anthropology from University Malaya (class of 1982). Immediately after attending UM, Ahmad went to Malaysia National Institute of Public Administration (INTAN) and received his Diploma in Public Management (class of 1983). He has been praised for improving the quality of agriculture in Bukit Lada especially during his tenure as Exco Kedah in 1999.

== Early life ==
Ahmad hails from Kampung Panchor, Pokok Sena, Kedah, Malaysia. He is the son of Hajah Yah binti Lebai Dahaman and Lebai Sudin bin Lebai Ahmad. His father found Kampong Panchor during the Japan invasion in Tanah Melayu. Both of his parents are from the local ulama's lineage, thus the name Lebai. He become head of UMNO Youth Kedah state in 1994, but he was replaced by his deputy Abd. Wahab Din in 1996.

== Political Achievements ==
- ADUN Kawasan Bukit Lada (1995-1999, 2013–present)
- Ketua UMNO Bahagian Pokok Sena (1998 - 2013)
- Ketua Pemuda UMNO Cawangan Kg Panchor, Pokok Sena, Bahagian Padang Terap (1983 – 1990)
- Jawatankuasa Pergerakan Pemuda UMNO Bahagian Padang Terap (1986)
- Jawatankuasa UMNO Bahagian Padang Terap (1990)
- Ketua Pergerakan Pemuda UMNO Bahagian Padang Terap (1993)
- Ketua Pergerakan Pemuda UMNO Bahagian Pokok Sena (1994)
- Naib Ketua Pergerakan Pemuda UMNO Negeri Kedah (1993 – 1994)
- Ketua Pergerakan Pemuda UMNO Negeri Kedah (1994 – 1996)
- EXCO Pergerakan Pemuda UMNO Malaysia (1993 – 1996)
- Timbalan Pengerusi Biro Hal Ehwal Islam Pemuda UMNO Malaysia (1994 – 1995)
- Pengerusi Biro Hal Ehwal Islam Pemuda UMNO Malaysia (1995 – 1996)
- Pengerusi Biro Hal Ehwal Islam UMNO Negeri Kedah (1998 – 1999)
- Ahli Jawatankuasa Badan Perhubungan UMNO Negeri Kedah (1993 – 2013)
- Setiausaha Barisan Nasional Negeri Kedah (1999 – 2004)

== Defamation Suit Controversy ==
Ahmad wins defamation suit against Datuk Ariffin Man, who is also the Kedah Barisan Nasional (BN) Executive Secretary. Ariffin Man was ordered by the High Court to pay RM150,000 in damages to Bukit Lada assemblyman Datuk Ahmad Lebai Sudin for uttering defamatory remarks in his speech in Dewan Sri Tanjung, Santap, Pokok Sena, Kedah.

== Election results ==
Kedah State Legislative Assembly
Year	Constituency	Candidate	Votes	Pct	Opponent(s)	Votes	Pct	Ballots cast	Majority	Turnout
1995	N09 Bukit Lada	Ahmad Lebai Sudin (UMNO)	9,189	54.67%	Mahmood @ Mohamood Che Mat @ Hj Ahmad (PAS)	7,201	42.84%	16,809	1,988	76.42%
1999	N09 Bukit Lada	Ahmad Lebai Sudin (UMNO)	8,516	46.51%	Sheikh Ismail Kamis (PAS)	9,368	51.16%	18,310	852	78.97%
2004	N10 Bukit Pinang	Ahmad Lebai Sudin (UMNO)	8,699	47.08%	Md Roshidi Osman (PAS)	9,636	52.15%	18,479	937	81.70%
2013	N09 Bukit Lada	Ahmad Lebai Sudin (UMNO)	12,664	51.65%	Ahmad Izzat Mohamad Shauki (PAS)	11,340	46.25%	24,521	1,324	88.90%

== Honours ==
- Kedah
  - Knight Companion of the Order of Loyalty to the Royal House of Kedah (DSDK) – Dato' (2002)
  - Justice of the Peace (JP) (1997)
