= Sungai Limau (state constituency) =

Malaysia state constituency

Sungai Limau (N20)
Kedah constituency

State constituency
- Legislature: Kedah State Legislative Assembly
MLA
Mohd Azam Abd Samat
PN
- Constituency created: 2003
- First contested: 2004
- Last contested: 2023

Demographics
- Electors (2023): 34,283

Sungai Limau is a state constituency in Kedah, Malaysia, that has been represented in the Kedah State Legislative Assembly.

== Demographics ==
As of 2020, Sungai Limau has a population of 35,807 people.

Ethnic breakdown of Sungai Limau's electorate as of 2023
1. Malay (94.1%)
2. Chinese (5.61%)
3. Other ethnicities (0.26%)
4. Indian (0.07%)

== History ==
=== Polling districts ===
According to the gazette issued on 30 March 2018, the Sungai Limau constituency has a total of 19 polling districts.

State constituency	Polling districts	Code	Location
Sungai Limau (N20）	Matang Buloh	012/20/01	SK Permatang Buloh
Sungai Limau (N20）	Sungai Dedap	012/20/02	SK Sungai Dedap
Sungai Limau (N20）	Gelam Tiga	012/20/03	SMA Nahdzah
Sungai Limau (N20）	Bukit Choras	012/20/04	SMA Nahdzah
Sungai Limau (N20）	Bukit Besar	012/20/05	SK Bukit Besar
Sungai Limau (N20）	Simpang Tiga Luar	012/20/06	SK Simpang Tiga Sungai Daun
Sungai Limau (N20）	Simpang Tiga	012/20/07	SJK (C) Aik Min
Sungai Limau (N20）	Selengkoh	012/20/08	SK Haji Kassim Jasin
Sungai Limau (N20）	Sungai Daun	012/20/09	SK Sungai Daun Tengah
Sungai Limau (N20）	Sungai Limau	012/20/10	SK Sungai Limau
Sungai Limau (N20）	Kabu Sepuloh	012/20/11	SMK Sungai Limau
Sungai Limau (N20）	Sungai Kering	012/20/12	SK Sungai Kering
Sungai Limau (N20）	Sedaka	012/20/13	SK Ulu Sedaka
Sungai Limau (N20）	Ulu Sedaka	012/20/14	SK Ulu Sedaka
Sungai Limau (N20）	Padang Lumat	012/20/15	SMK Batu 17
Sungai Limau (N20）	Batu Enam Belas	012/20/16	SK Padang Lumat
Sungai Limau (N20）	Kampung Titi Batu	012/20/17	SJK (C) Pei Hwa
Sungai Limau (N20）	Dulang Kechil	012/20/18	SK Dulang
Sungai Limau (N20）	Dulang Besar	012/20/19	SMK Dulang

=== Representation history ===
Kedah State Legislative Assemblyman for Sungai Limau
Assembly	No	Years	Member	Party
Constituency created from Sala and Guar Chempedak
11th	N20	2004–2008	Azizan Abdul Razak	BA (PAS)
12th	N20	2008–2013	Azizan Abdul Razak	PR (PAS)
13th	N20	2013	Azizan Abdul Razak	PR (PAS)
13th	N20	2013–2015	Mohd Azam Abd Samat	PR (PAS)
13th	N20	2015–2016	Mohd Azam Abd Samat	PAS
13th	N20	2016–2018	Mohd Azam Abd Samat	GS (PAS)
14th	N20	2018–2020	Mohd Azam Abd Samat	GS (PAS)
14th	N20	2020–2023	Mohd Azam Abd Samat	PN (PAS)
15th	N20	2023–present	Mohd Azam Abd Samat	PN (PAS)

== Election results ==
Kedah state election, 2023
Party	Candidate	Votes	%	∆%
PN	Mohd Azam Abd Samat	23,000	84.88	▲84.88
PH	Siti Balqis Husain	4,096	15.21	▼3.04
Total valid votes		27,096	100.00	
Total rejected ballots		130		
Unreturned ballots		18		
Turnout		27,244	79.47	▼7.13
Registered electors		34,283		
Majority		18,904	69.67	▲45.40
PN hold		Swing		

Kedah state election, 2018
Party	Candidate	Votes	%	∆%
PAS	Mohd Azam Abd Samat	13,048	53.01	▲0.66
BN	Norma Awang	7,075	28.74	▼18.91
PKR	Zahran Abdullah	4,493	18.25	▲18.25
Total valid votes		31,813	100.00	
Total rejected ballots		279		
Unreturned ballots		0		
Turnout		24,616	86.60	▲1.36
Registered electors		28,800		
Majority		5,973	24.27	▲19.57
PAS hold		Swing		

Kedah state by-election, 4 November 2013 Upon the death of incumbent, Azizan Abdul Razak.
Party	Candidate	Votes	%	∆%
PAS	Mohd Azam Abd Samat	12,069	52.35	▼3.05
BN	Sohaimi Lazim	10,985	47.65	▲3.81
Total valid votes		23,054	100.00	
Total rejected ballots		145		
Unreturned ballots		6		
Turnout		23,205	85.24	▼4.16
Registered electors		27,222		
Majority		1,084	4.70	▼6.86
PAS hold		Swing		

Kedah state election, 2013
Party	Candidate	Votes	%	∆%
PAS	Azizan Abdul Razak	13,294	55.40	▼2.30
BN	Mohd Fadzillah Mohd Ali	10,520	43.84	▼1.54
Independent	Sobri Ahmad	100	0.42	▲0.42
Independent	Abdullah Hashim	84	0.35	▲0.35
Total valid votes		23,998	100.00	
Total rejected ballots		351		
Unreturned ballots		57		
Turnout		24,406	89.40	▲5.35
Registered electors		27,287		
Majority		2,774	11.56	▼3.84
PAS hold		Swing		

Kedah state election, 2008
Party	Candidate	Votes	%	∆%
PAS	Azizan Abdul Razak	12,028	57.70	▲5.09
BN	Basorri Abu Hassan	8,816	42.30	▼5.09
Total valid votes		20,884	100.00	
Total rejected ballots		284		
Unreturned ballots		43		
Turnout		21,171	84.05	▼0.37
Registered electors		25,189		
Majority		3,212	15.40	▲10.18
PAS hold		Swing		

Kedah state election, 2004
Party	Candidate	Votes	%
PAS	Azizan Abdul Razak	10,882	52.61
BN	Mohd Suhaimi Abdullah	9,802	47.39
Total valid votes		20,684	100.00
Total rejected ballots		268	
Unreturned ballots		0	
Turnout		20,952	84.42
Registered electors		24,820	
Majority		1,080	5.22
This was a new constituency created.
