= Jeneri =

State constituency in Kedah, Malaysia

Jeneri (N24)
Kedah constituency

State constituency
- Legislature: Kedah State Legislative Assembly
MLA
Muhammad Sanusi Md Nor
PN
- Constituency created: 1984
- First contested: 1986
- Last contested: 2023

Demographics
- Electors (2023): 35,097

Jeneri is a state constituency in Kedah, Malaysia, that has been represented in the Kedah State Legislative Assembly.

== Demographics ==
As of 2020, Jeneri has a population of 37,551 people.

Ethnic breakdown of Jeneri's electorate as of 2023
1. Malay (92.2%)
2. Other ethnicities (6.45%)
3. Chinese (1.28%)
4. Indian (0.11%)

== History ==
=== Polling districts ===
According to the gazette issued on 30 March 2018, the Jeneri constituency has a total of 14 polling districts.

State constituency	Polling districts	Code	Location
Jeneri (N24)	Padang Chichak	023/24/01	SK Padang Chicak
Jeneri (N24)	Kampung Betong	023/24/02	SK Kampung Betong
Jeneri (N24)	Kota Bukit	013/24/03	SK Kg Kota Bukit
Jeneri (N24)	Kuala Jeneri	013/24/04	SK Jeneri
Jeneri (N24)	Kampung Kalai	013/24/05	SK Kalai
Jeneri (N24)	Kampung Kuala Bigia	013/24/06	Klinik Kesihatan Jeniang
Jeneri (N24)	Kampung Chemara	013/24/07	SK Chemara
Jeneri (N24)	Kampung Bigia	013/24/08	Dewan Orang Ramai Watt Siam Kampung Begia
Jeneri (N24)	Kampung Telui	013/24/09	SK Teloi Tua
Jeneri (N24)	Batu Lima	013/24/10	SK Batu Lima
Jeneri (N24)	Charok Padang	013/24/11	SMK Seri Enggang
Jeneri (N24)	Hujong Bandar	013/24/12	SK Hujung Bandar
Jeneri (N24)	Kampung Bandar	013/24/13	SK Teloi Tua
Jeneri (N24)	Tupai	013/24/14	SK Haji Hussain
Jeneri (N24)	FELDA Telui Timor	013/24/15	SK Teloi Timor
Jeneri (N24)	Beris Jaya	013/24/16	SK Bandar Baru Beris Jaya

=== Representation history ===
Kedah State Legislative Assemblyman for Jeneri
Assembly	No	Years	Member	Party
Constituency created from Sik and Jeniang
7th	N19	1986–1990	Wan Azmi Ariffin	BN (UMNO)
8th	N19	1990–1995	Wan Azmi Ariffin	BN (UMNO)
9th	N23	1995–1999	Mohd. Hadzir Jaafar	BN (UMNO)
10th	N23	1999–2004	Yahya Abdullah	BA (PAS)
11th	N24	2004–2008	Ismail Harun	BN (UMNO)
12th	N24	2008–2013	Yahya Abdullah	PR (PAS)
13th	N24	2013–2018	Mahadzir Abdul Hamid	BN (UMNO)
14th	N24	2018–2020	Muhammad Sanusi Md Nor	GS (PAS)
14th	N24	2020–2023	Muhammad Sanusi Md Nor	PN (PAS)
15th	N24	2023–present	Muhammad Sanusi Md Nor	PN (PAS)

== Election results ==
Kedah state election, 2023: Jeneri
Party	Candidate	Votes	%	∆%
PN	Muhammad Sanusi Md Nor	21,823	79.08	▲79.08
BN	Muhamad Khizri Abu Kassim	5,773	20.92	▼14.69
Total valid votes		27,596	100.00	
Total rejected ballots		144		
Unreturned ballots		14		
Turnout		27,754	79.08	▼5.62
Registered electors		35,097		
Majority		16,050	58.16	▲47.46
PN hold		Swing		

Kedah state election, 2018: Jeneri
Party	Candidate	Votes	%	∆%
PAS	Muhammad Sanusi Md Nor	10,626	46.31	▲0.87
BN	Mahadzir Abdul Hamid	8,171	35.61	▼18.95
PKR	Mohd Nazri Abu Hassan	4,146	18.08	▲18.08
Total valid votes		22,943	100.00	
Total rejected ballots		391		
Unreturned ballots		0		
Turnout		23,399	84.70	▼5.10
Registered electors		27,641		
Majority		2,455	10.70	▲1.58
PAS gain from BN		Swing		?

Kedah state election, 2013: Jeneri
Party	Candidate	Votes	%	∆%
BN	Mahadzir Abdul Hamid	12,318	54.56	▲5.05
PAS	Ahmad Tarmizi Sulaiman	10,258	45.44	▼5.05
Total valid votes		22,576	100.00	
Total rejected ballots		351		
Unreturned ballots		41		
Turnout		22,968	89.80	▲4.35
Registered electors		25,586		
Majority		2,060	9.12	▲8.14
BN gain from PAS		Swing		?

Kedah state election, 2008: Jeneri
Party	Candidate	Votes	%	∆%
PAS	Yahya Abdullah	8,608	50.49	▲2.42
BN	Hasbullah Isa	8,441	49.51	▼2.42
Total valid votes		17,049	100.00	
Total rejected ballots		251		
Unreturned ballots		920		
Turnout		18,220	85.45	▼0.31
Registered electors		21,323		
Majority		167	0.98	▼2.88
PAS gain from BN		Swing		?

Kedah state election, 2004: Jeneri
Party	Candidate	Votes	%	∆%
BN	Ismail Harun	8,631	51.93	▲3.27
PAS	Yahya Abdullah	7,991	48.07	▼3.27
Total valid votes		19,722	100.00	
Total rejected ballots		280		
Unreturned ballots		11		
Turnout		16,913	85.76	▲3.22
Registered electors		17,384		
Majority		640	3.86	▲1.18
BN gain from PAS		Swing		?

Kedah state election, 1999: Jeneri
Party	Candidate	Votes	%	∆%
PAS	Yahya Abdullah	7,193	51.34	▲5.60
BN	Mohd. Hadzir Jaafar	6,814	48.66	▼5.60
Total valid votes		14,007	100.00	
Total rejected ballots		342		
Unreturned ballots		0		
Turnout		14,349	82.54	▲3.24
Registered electors		17,384		
Majority		379	2.68	▼5.84
PAS gain from BN		Swing		?

Kedah state election, 1995: Jeneri
Party	Candidate	Votes	%	∆%
BN	Mohd. Hadzir Jaafar	6,751	54.26	▼2.76
PAS	Harum Jusoh	5,690	45.74	▲4.66
Total valid votes		12,441	100.00	
Total rejected ballots		268		
Unreturned ballots		10		
Turnout		12,719	79.30	▼0.98
Registered electors		16,040		
Majority		1,061	8.52	▼7.42
BN hold		Swing		

Kedah state election, 1990: Jeneri
Party	Candidate	Votes	%	∆%
BN	Wan Azmi Ariffin	12,069	57.02	▲0.92
PAS	Hj. Mohd Muslim	8,695	41.08	▼2.82
Independent	Abu Hassan Abdul	401	1.90	▲1.90
Total valid votes		21,165	100.00	
Total rejected ballots		719		
Unreturned ballots		0		
Turnout		21,884	80.28	▲1.61
Registered electors		27,259		
Majority		3,374	15.94	▲3.74
BN hold		Swing		

Kedah state election, 1986: Jeneri
Party	Candidate	Votes	%
BN	Wan Azmi Ariffin	9,973	56.10
PAS	Hamzah Abdul Latif	7,805	43.90
Total valid votes		17,778	100.00
Total rejected ballots		618	
Unreturned ballots		0	
Turnout		18,396	78.67
Registered electors		23,385	
Majority		2,168	12.20
This was a new constituency created.
