= Kubang Pasu (federal constituency) =

Federal constituency of Malaysia

Kubang Pasu (P006)
Kedah constituency

Federal constituency
- Legislature: Dewan Rakyat
- MP: Ku Abdul Rahman Ku Ismail; PN
- Constituency created: 1974
- First contested: 1974
- Last contested: 2022

Demographics
- Population (2020): 171,375
- Electors (2023): 109,113
- Area (km²): 634
- Pop. density (per km²): 270.3

Kubang Pasu is a federal constituency in Kubang Pasu District, Kedah, Malaysia, that has been represented in the Dewan Rakyat since 1974.

The federal constituency was created in the 1974 redistribution and is mandated to return a single member to the Dewan Rakyat under the first past the post voting system.

== Demographics ==
https://live.chinapress.com.my/ge15/parliament/KEDAH

Ethnic breakdown of Kubang Pasu's electorate as of 2022
1. Malay (86.5%)
2. Chinese (8.80%)
3. Indian (3.70%)
4. Other ethnicities (0.90%)

As of 2020, Kubang Pasu has a population of 171,375 people.

Age breakdown of Kubang Pasu's electorate as of 2022
1. 18-20 (7.42%)
2. 21-29 (24.5%)
3. 30-39 (23.1%)
4. 40-49 (15.8%)
5. 50-59 (12.7%)
6. 60-69 (10.1%)
7. 70-79 (4.87%)
8. 80-89 (1.47%)
9. above 90 (0.21%)
Gender breakdown of Kubang Pasu's electorate as of 2022
1. Male (49.7%)
2. Female (50.3%)

== History ==
=== Polling districts ===
According to the federal gazette issued on 18 July 2023, the Kubang Pasu constituency is divided into 44 polling districts.

State constituency	Polling Districts	Code	Location
Bukit Kayu Hitam (N05）	Bukit Kayu Hitam	006/05/01	SK Bandar Bukit Kayu Hitam
Bukit Kayu Hitam (N05）	FELDA Bukit Tangga	006/05/02	SK FELDA Bukit Tangga
Bukit Kayu Hitam (N05）	Temin	006/05/03	SK Dato' Wan Kemara
Bukit Kayu Hitam (N05）	FELDA Laka Selatan	006/05/04	SK FELDA Laka Selatan
Bukit Kayu Hitam (N05）	FELDA Batu Lapan	006/05/05	SK Batu 8
Bukit Kayu Hitam (N05）	Pekan Baru Changlun	006/05/06	SJK (C) Yit Min
Bukit Kayu Hitam (N05）	Pekan Lama Changlun	006/05/07	SJK (T) Changlun
Bukit Kayu Hitam (N05）	Sintok	006/05/08	SK Bandar Baru Sintok
Bukit Kayu Hitam (N05）	Kampung Darat	006/05/09	SMK Changlun
Bukit Kayu Hitam (N05）	Kubang Pasu	006/05/10	SMK Hosba
Bukit Kayu Hitam (N05）	Guar Napai	006/05/11	SK Guar Napai
Bukit Kayu Hitam (N05）	Hosba	006/05/12	SK Hosba
Bukit Kayu Hitam (N05）	Kampung Napoh	006/05/13	SK Hosba
Bukit Kayu Hitam (N05）	Binjal	006/05/14	Pertubuhan Peladang Kawasan Asun
Bukit Kayu Hitam (N05）	Kampung Bemban	006/05/15	SK Gelong
Bukit Kayu Hitam (N05）	Pulau Pisang	006/05/16	SMK Pulau Nyior
Bukit Kayu Hitam (N05）	Pekan Tunjang	008/05/17	SK Tunjang
Bukit Kayu Hitam (N05）	Pulau Timboi	008/05/18	SK Hakim Teh
Bukit Kayu Hitam (N05）	Padang Limau	008/05/19	Bangunan Persatuan Peladang (MADA) D-11 Tunjang
Bukit Kayu Hitam (N05）	Pulau Nyior	006/05/20	SRA Al-Azhar
Bukit Kayu Hitam (N05）	Kampung Pulau Ketam	006/05/21	SMK Pulau Nyior
Bukit Kayu Hitam (N05）	Gelong Rambai	006/05/22	SJK (C) Hwa Min
Jitra (N06)	Paya Kemunting	006/06/01	SJK (T) Paya Kemunting
Jitra (N06)	Kampung Kuluang	006/06/02	SK Binjal
Jitra (N06)	Malau	006/06/03	SK Malau
Jitra (N06)	Padang Panjang	006/06/04	SK Malau
Jitra (N06)	Wang Tepus	006/06/05	SK Penghulu Hj Darus
Jitra (N06)	Taman Jitra Jaya	006/06/06	SK Jitra
Jitra (N06)	Taman Rasa Sayang	006/06/07	SJK (C) Chung Hwa
Jitra (N06)	Taman Pasu	006/06/08	SK Sultan Ahmad Tajuddin
Jitra (N06)	Kampung Telok Nibong	006/06/09	SK Jitra 3
Jitra (N06)	Kampung Batu 13	006/06/10	SMK Paya Kemunting
Jitra (N06)	Taman Jitra	006/06/11	SMK Jitra
Jitra (N06)	Pantai Halban	006/06/12	SK Bandar Baru Darulaman
Jitra (N06)	Kampung Tok Kesop	006/06/13	SK Jitra 2
Jitra (N06)	Tanah Merah	006/06/14	SMK Tanjung Pauh
Jitra (N06)	Kampung Telok Malik	006/06/15	SK Telok Malek
Jitra (N06)	Kampung Naga	006/06/16	SK Padang Pekan
Jitra (N06)	Lubuk Kawah	006/06/17	SMK Sultan Abdul Halim
Jitra (N06)	Taman Mahsuri	006/06/18	SMK Bandar Baru Darulaman
Jitra (N06)	Alor Rambai	006/06/19	SMK Tunku Anum Tunku Abdul Rahman
Jitra (N06)	Lubok Batu	006/06/20	SK Seri Banai
Jitra (N06)	Bukit Tinggi	006/06/21	SK Bukit Tinggi
Jitra (N06)	Kepala Batas	006/06/22	SK Kepala Batas

=== Representation history ===
Members of Parliament for Kubang Pasu
Parliament	No	Years	Member	Party	Vote Share
Constituency created from Kubang Pasu Barat and Jitra-Padang Terap
4th	P004	1974–1978	Mahathir Mohamad (محاضير محمد)	BN (UMNO)	Uncontested
5th	P004	1978–1982	Mahathir Mohamad (محاضير محمد)	BN (UMNO)	18,198; 64.64%
6th	P004	1982–1986	Mahathir Mohamad (محاضير محمد)	BN (UMNO)	24,524; 73.67%
7th	P004	1986–1990	Mahathir Mohamad (محاضير محمد)	BN (UMNO)	25,452; 71.48%
8th	P004	1990–1995	Mahathir Mohamad (محاضير محمد)	BN (UMNO)	30,681; 78.07%
9th	P006	1995–1999	Mahathir Mohamad (محاضير محمد)	BN (UMNO)	24,495; 77.12%
10th	P006	1999–2004	Mahathir Mohamad (محاضير محمد)	BN (UMNO)	22,399; 64.62%
11th	P006	2004–2008	Mohd Johari Baharum (محمد جوهري بهاروم)	BN (UMNO)	26,657; 67.31%
12th	P006	2008–2013	Mohd Johari Baharum (محمد جوهري بهاروم)	BN (UMNO)	24,179; 58.55%
13th	P006	2013–2018	Mohd Johari Baharum (محمد جوهري بهاروم)	BN (UMNO)	33,334; 59.29%
14th	P006	2018–2020	Amiruddin Hamzah (أميرالدين حمزة)	PH (BERSATU)	29,984; 49.70%
14th	P006	2020	Amiruddin Hamzah (أميرالدين حمزة)	BERSATU	29,984; 49.70%
14th	P006	2020	Amiruddin Hamzah (أميرالدين حمزة)	Independent	29,984; 49.70%
14th	P006	2020–2022	Amiruddin Hamzah (أميرالدين حمزة)	PEJUANG	29,984; 49.70%
15th	P006	2022–present	Ku Abdul Rahman Ku Ismail (كو عبدالرحمن بن كو إسماعيل)	PN (BERSATU)	47,584; 57.05%

=== State constituency ===
Parliamentary constituency	State constituency						
Parliamentary constituency	1955–1959*	1959–1974	1974–1986	1986–1995	1995–2004	2004–2018	2018–present
Kubang Pasu						Bukit Kayu Hitam	
Kubang Pasu			Jitra				
Kubang Pasu			Tunjang				

=== Historical boundaries ===
State Constituency	Area				
State Constituency	1974	1984	1994	2003	2018
Bukit Kayu Hitam				Bukit Kayu Hitam; Changlun; FELDA Laka Selatan; Sintok; Tunjang	
Jitra	Bandar Darulaman; FELDA Guar Napai; Kampung Nangka; Kampung Wang Perah; Lubuk Kawah		Bandar Darulaman; Kampung Charok Tok Latah; Kampung Teluk Malek; Kampung Tradisi Paya Pahlawan; Lubuk Kawah		
Tunjang	Bukit Kayu Hitam; Changlun; Kodiang; Sintok; Tunjang		Bukit Kayu Hitam; Changlun; Kampung Nangka; Sintok; Tunjang		

=== Current state assembly members ===
No.	State Constituency	Member	Coalition (Party)
N05	Bukit Kayu Hitam	Halimaton Shaadiah Saad	PN (BERSATU)
N06	Jitra	Haim Hilman Abdullah	PN (PAS)

=== Local governments & postcodes ===
No.	State Constituency	Local Government	Postcode
N05	Bukit Kayu Hitam	Kubang Pasu Municipal Council	06000 Jitra; 06010 Changlun; 06050 Bukit Kayu Hitam; 06200 Kepala Batas; 06300 Kuala Nerang
N06	Jitra	Kubang Pasu Municipal Council	06000 Jitra; 06010 Changlun; 06050 Bukit Kayu Hitam; 06200 Kepala Batas; 06300 Kuala Nerang

== Election results ==
Malaysian general election, 2022
Party	Candidate	Votes	%	∆%
PN	Ku Abdul Rahman Ku Ismail	47,584	57.05	▲57.05
PH	Aizuddin Ariffin	16,000	19.18	▲19.18
BN	Hasmuni Hassan	14,489	17.37	▼10.80
PEJUANG	Amiruddin Hamzah	5,329	6.39	▲6.39
Total valid votes		83,402	100.00	
Total rejected ballots		617		
Unreturned ballots		85		
Turnout		84,104	77.72	▼5.46
Registered electors		108,217		
Majority		31,584	37.87	▲16.31
PN gain from PKR		Swing		?
Source(s) https://lom.agc.gov.my/ilims/upload/portal/akta/outputp/1753260/PUB%20606%20(2022).pdf

Malaysian general election, 2018
Party	Candidate	Votes	%	∆%
PKR	Amiruddin Hamzah	29,984	49.70	▲49.70
BN	Mohd Johari Baharum	16,975	28.14	▼31.15
PAS	Norhafiza Fadzil	13,375	22.17	▼18.54
Total valid votes		60,334	100.00	
Total rejected ballots		770		
Unreturned ballots		348		
Turnout		61,452	83.18	▼4.23
Registered electors		73,881		
Majority		13,009	21.56	▲2.98
PKR gain from BN		Swing		?
Source(s) "His Majesty's Government Gazette - Notice of Contested Election, Parliament for the State of Kedah [P.U. (B) 233/2018]" (PDF). Attorney General's Chambers of Malaysia. 3 May 2018. "Federal Government Gazette - Results of Contested Election and Statements of the Poll after the Official Addition of Votes, Parliamentary Constituencies for the State of Kedah [P.U. (B) 307/2018]" (PDF). Attorney General's Chambers of Malaysia. 28 May 2018.

Malaysian general election, 2013
Party	Candidate	Votes	%	∆%
BN	Mohd Johari Baharum	33,334	59.29	▲0.74
PAS	Mohd Jamal Nasir	22,890	40.71	▼0.74
Total valid votes		56,224	100.00	
Total rejected ballots		834		
Unreturned ballots		238		
Turnout		57,296	87.41	▲7.98
Registered electors		65,550		
Majority		10,444	18.58	▲1.48
BN hold		Swing		
Source(s) "Federal Government Gazette - Notice of Contested Election, Parliament for the State of Kedah [P.U. (B) 170/2013]" (PDF). Attorney General's Chambers of Malaysia. 26 April 2013. Archived from the original (PDF) on 2019-12-29. "Federal Government Gazette - Results of Contested Election and Statements of the Poll after the Official Addition of Votes, Parliamentary Constituencies for the State of Kedah [P.U. (B) 211/2013]" (PDF). Attorney General's Chambers of Malaysia. 22 May 2013.

Malaysian general election, 2008
Party	Candidate	Votes	%	∆%
BN	Mohd Johari Baharum	24,179	58.55	▼8.76
PAS	Abd Isa Ismail	17,119	41.45	▲8.76
Total valid votes		41,298	100.00	
Total rejected ballots		928		
Unreturned ballots		127		
Turnout		42,353	79.43	▼2.44
Registered electors		53,323		
Majority		7,060	17.10	▼17.52
BN hold		Swing		

Malaysian general election, 2004
Party	Candidate	Votes	%	∆%
BN	Mohd Johari Baharum	26,657	67.31	▲2.69
PAS	Abd Isa Ismail	12,945	32.69	▼2.69
Total valid votes		39,602	100.00	
Total rejected ballots		919		
Unreturned ballots		81		
Turnout		40,602	81.87	▲3.26
Registered electors		49,593		
Majority		13,712	34.62	▲5.38
BN hold		Swing		

Malaysian general election, 1999
Party	Candidate	Votes	%	∆%
BN	Mahathir Mohamad	22,399	64.62	▼12.50
PAS	Ahmad Subki Abd. Latif @ Subky Abd. Latif	12,261	35.38	▲12.50
Total valid votes		34,660	100.00	
Total rejected ballots		677		
Unreturned ballots		769		
Turnout		36,106	78.61	▲4.58
Registered electors		45,930		
Majority		10,138	29.24	▼25.00
BN hold		Swing		

Malaysian general election, 1995
Party	Candidate	Votes	%	∆%
BN	Mahathir Mohamad	24,495	77.12	▼0.95
PAS	Ahmad Ma'alim @ Mohd Alim	7,269	22.88	▲0.95
Total valid votes		31,764	100.00	
Total rejected ballots		1,246		
Unreturned ballots		186		
Turnout		33,196	74.03	▼3.48
Registered electors		44,841		
Majority		17,226	54.24	▼1.90
BN hold		Swing		

Malaysian general election, 1990
Party	Candidate	Votes	%	∆%
BN	Mahathir Mohamad	30,681	78.07	▲6.59
S46	Sudin Wahab	8,619	21.93	▲21.93
Total valid votes		39,300	100.00	
Total rejected ballots		1,270		
Unreturned ballots		0		
Turnout		40,570	77.51	▲3.30
Registered electors		52,341		
Majority		22,062	56.14	▲13.18
BN hold		Swing		

Malaysian general election, 1986
Party	Candidate	Votes	%	∆%
BN	Mahathir Mohamad	25,452	71.48	▼2.19
PAS	Azizan Ismail	10,154	28.52	▲2.19
Total valid votes		35,606	100.00	
Total rejected ballots		803		
Unreturned ballots		0		
Turnout		36,409	74.21	▼4.58
Registered electors		49,059		
Majority		15,298	42.96	▼4.38
BN hold		Swing		

Malaysian general election, 1982
Party	Candidate	Votes	%	∆%
BN	Mahathir Mohamad	24,524	73.67	▲9.03
PAS	Yusof Abdullah	8,763	26.33	▼9.03
Total valid votes		33,287	100.00	
Total rejected ballots		1,053		
Unreturned ballots		0		
Turnout		34,340	78.79	▲0.35
Registered electors		43,583		
Majority		15,761	47.34	▲18.06
BN hold		Swing		

Malaysian general election, 1978
Party	Candidate	Votes	%	∆%
BN	Mahathir Mohamad	18,198	64.64	▲64.64
PAS	Halim Arshat	9,953	35.36	▲35.36
Total valid votes		28,151	100.00	
Total rejected ballots		863		
Unreturned ballots		0		
Turnout		29,014	78.37	
Registered electors		37,022		
Majority		8,245	29.28	
BN hold		Swing		

Malaysian general election, 1974
Party	Candidate	Votes	%
On the nomination day, Mahathir Mohamad won uncontested.
BN	Mahathir Mohamad		
Total valid votes			100.00
Total rejected ballots			
Unreturned ballots			
Turnout			
Registered electors		33,258	
Majority			
This was a new constituency created.
