= Guar Chempedak (state constituency) =

State constituency in Kedah, Malaysia

Guar Chempedak (N21)
Kedah constituency

State constituency
- Legislature: Kedah State Legislative Assembly
MLA
Abdul Ghafar Saad
PN
- Constituency created: 1994
- First contested: 1994
- Last contested: 2023

Demographics
- Population (2020): 37,338
- Electors (2023): 30,085

Guar Chempedak is a state constituency in Kedah, Malaysia, that has been represented in the Kedah State Legislative Assembly.

== Demographics ==
As of 2020, Guar Chempedak has a population of 37,338 people.

Ethnic breakdown of Guar Chempedak's electorate as of 2023
1. Malay (89.8%)
2. Chinese (9.14%)
3. Indian (0.69%)
4. Other ethnicities (0.34%)

== History ==
=== Polling districts ===
According to the gazette issued on 30 March 2018, the Guar Chempedak constituency has a total of 16 polling districts.

State constituency	Polling districts	Code	Location
Guar Chempedak (N21）	Pondok Haji Majid	012/21/01	SK Haji Hussin Dol
Guar Chempedak (N21）	Taman Sri Wangsa	012/21/02	SMK Guar Chempedak
Guar Chempedak (N21）	Pondok Haji Hussein	012/21/03	SK Guar Chempedak
Guar Chempedak (N21）	Titi Teras	012/21/04	SJK (C) Pei Eng
Guar Chempedak (N21）	Teroi	012/21/05	SK Teroi
Guar Chempedak (N21）	Titi Serong	012/21/06	SJK (C) Chung Hwa
Guar Chempedak (N21）	Kuala Yan Kechil	012/21/07	SMA Fauzi
Guar Chempedak (N21）	Pekan Sungai Yan	012/21/08	SK Yan Kechil
Guar Chempedak (N21）	Sungai Udang	012/21/09	SK Kampung Pauh
Guar Chempedak (N21）	Singkir Darat	012/21/10	SK Singkir
Guar Chempedak (N21）	Kampung Acheh	012/21/11	Maktab Mahmud Yan
Guar Chempedak (N21）	Lubok Buoy	012/21/12	SK Haji Nyak Gam
Guar Chempedak (N21）	Pekan Yan	012/21/13	SK Langkasuka
Guar Chempedak (N21）	Sungai Raga	012/21/14	SJK (C) York Khoon
Guar Chempedak (N21）	Ruat	012/21/15	SK Tok Mat Salleh
Guar Chempedak (N21）	Singkir Laut	012/21/16	SK Singkir

=== Representation history ===
Kedah State Legislative Assemblyman for Guar Chempedak
Assembly	No	Years	Member	Party
Constituency renamed from Yan
9th	N21	1995–1999	Abd Razak Hashim	BN (UMNO)
10th	N21	1999–2004	Abd Razak Hashim	BN (UMNO)
11th	N21	2004–2008	Abd Razak Hashim	BN (UMNO)
12th	N21	2008–2013	Ku Abdul Rahman Ku Ismail	BN (UMNO)
13th	N21	2013–2018	Ku Abdul Rahman Ku Ismail	BN (UMNO)
14th	N21	2018	Ku Abdul Rahman Ku Ismail	BN (UMNO)
14th	N21	2018–2019	Ku Abdul Rahman Ku Ismail	Independent
14th	N21	2019–2020	Ku Abdul Rahman Ku Ismail	PH (BERSATU)
14th	N21	2020–2023	Ku Abdul Rahman Ku Ismail	PN (BERSATU)
15th	N21	2023–present	Abdul Ghafar Saad	PN (BERSATU)

== Election results ==
Kedah state election, 2023
Party	Candidate	Votes	%	∆%
PN	Abdul Ghafar Saad	17,266	76.40	▲76.40
BN	Abdul Paris Abdul Hamid	5,157	22.82	▼12.48
Independent	Ku Abdul Halim Ku Ismail	176	0.78	▲0.78
Total valid votes		22,599	100.00	
Total rejected ballots		132		
Unreturned ballots		24		
Turnout		22,755	75.64	▼7.46
Registered electors		30,085		
Majority		12,109	53.58	▲52.18
PN gain from BN		Swing		?

Kedah state election, 2018
Party	Candidate	Votes	%	∆%
BN	Ku Abdul Rahman Ku Ismail	6,518	35.30	▼18.85
PAS	Musoddak Ahmad	6,259	33.90	▼11.95
PKR	Mohd Safuan Sabari	5,686	30.80	▲30.80
Total valid votes		18,463	100.00	
Total rejected ballots		292		
Unreturned ballots		0		
Turnout		18,819	83.10	▼3.70
Registered electors		22,646		
Majority		259	1.40	▼6.90
BN hold		Swing		

Kedah state election, 2013
Party	Candidate	Votes	%	∆%
BN	Ku Abdul Rahman Ku Ismail	10,158	54.15	▼2.12
PAS	Musoddak Ahmad	7,860	45.85	▲2.12
Total valid votes		18,018	100.00	
Total rejected ballots		226		
Unreturned ballots		51		
Turnout		18,295	86.80	▲8.40
Registered electors		21,086		
Majority		2,298	8.30	▼4.24
BN hold		Swing		

Kedah state election, 2008
Party	Candidate	Votes	%	∆%
BN	Ku Abdul Rahman Ku Ismail	7,898	56.27	▼7.96
PAS	Mohamand Ismail	6,139	43.73	▲7.96
Total valid votes		14,037	100.00	
Total rejected ballots		205		
Unreturned ballots		36		
Turnout		14,278	78.40	▼0.29
Registered electors		18,211		
Majority		1,759	12.54	▼15.92
BN hold		Swing		

Kedah state election, 2004
Party	Candidate	Votes	%	∆%
BN	Abd Razak Hashim	8,949	64.23	▲5.97
PAS	Muhammad Afif Abdullah	4,983	35.77	▼5.97
Total valid votes		13,932	100.00	
Total rejected ballots		221		
Unreturned ballots		0		
Turnout		14,153	78.69	▲5.33
Registered electors		17,985		
Majority		3,966	28.46	▲11.94
BN hold		Swing		

Kedah state election, 1999
Party	Candidate	Votes	%	∆%
BN	Abd Razak Hashim	8,025	58.26	▼8.29
PAS	Che'pi @ Nasir Othman	5,750	41.74	▲8.29
Total valid votes		13,775	100.00	
Total rejected ballots		343		
Unreturned ballots		0		
Turnout		14,133	73.36	▲2.33
Registered electors		19,265		
Majority		2,275	16.52	▼16.58
BN hold		Swing		

Kedah state election, 1995
Party	Candidate	Votes	%
BN	Abd Razak Hashim	8,685	66.55
PAS	Baharom Hanafi	4,365	33.45
Total valid votes		13,050	100.00
Total rejected ballots		250	
Unreturned ballots		67	
Turnout		13,367	71.03
Registered electors		18,818	
Majority		4,320	33.10
This was a new constituency created.
