= Azizan Abdul Razak =

Malaysian politician (1944–2013)

Yang Berbahagia Tan Sri Dato' Seri Diraja Ustaz Haji Azizan Abdul Razak PSM SHMS SPMK JP
- عزيزان عبدالرزاق

10th Menteri Besar of Kedah
- In office 9 March 2008 – 6 May 2013
- Monarch: Abdul Halim
- Preceded by: Mahdzir Khalid
- Succeeded by: Mukhriz Mahathir
- Constituency: Sungai Limau

Member of the Kedah State Legislative Assembly for Sungai Limau
- In office 21 March 2004 – 26 September 2013
- Preceded by: constituency established
- Succeeded by: Mohd Azam Abd Samat (PR–PAS)
- Majority: 1,080 (2004); 3,212 (2008); 2,774 (2013)

Member of the Kedah State Legislative Assembly for Sala
- In office 25 April 1995 – 21 March 2004
- Preceded by: Ahmad Awang (BN–UMNO)
- Succeeded by: constituency renamed to Sungai Limau
- Majority: ? (1995); 2,621 (1999)

Personal details
- Born: 25 October 1944 Alor Setar, Kedah, Japanese occupation of Malaya (now Malaysia)
- Died: 26 September 2013 (aged 68) Alor Setar, Kedah, Malaysia
- Party: Pan-Malaysian Islamic Party (PAS); Pakatan Rakyat
- Spouse: Faikah Syeikh Hamzah
- Education: University of Kent; Al-Azhar University
- Occupation: State assemblyman

Azizan bin Abdul Razak (25 October 1944 – 26 September 2013) was a Malaysian politician who served as the 10th Menteri Besar (Chief Minister) of the state of Kedah from 2008 to 2013. A member of the Pan-Malaysian Islamic Party (PAS), he was the first Chief Minister of Kedah from a party other than the United Malays National Organisation (UMNO). He held the seat of Sungai Limau in the Kedah state assembly from 2004 until his death in 2013. He was also the state commissioner for PAS in Kedah and a member of the central committee of the national party.

== Political career ==
He was nominated by his party PAS to contest in the 1995 Kedah state election of Sala, which he won from Ahmad Awang, then UMNO Pendang Deputy Chief. Azizan was elected to the State Assembly of Kedah in 2004, for the seat of Sungai Limau. In 2008 his Parti Islam Se-Malaysia (PAS) was elected to government in Kedah, leading a coalition with the People's Justice Party (PKR) and the Democratic Action Party (DAP).

Azizan, as the leader of PAS in the state, became the first chief minister of Kedah from a party other than the United Malays National Organisation (UMNO); the 2008 victory broke a decades-long run of uninterrupted UMNO rule. On 16 July 2008, he was conferred the Darjah Seri Paduka Mahkota Kedah (SPMK) which carried the "Datuk Seri" title. The award was presented by Sultan Abdul Halim Muadzam Shah at Istana Anak Bukit in conjunction with the sultan's Golden Jubilee celebration.

His tenure as chief minister came to an end at the 2013 election, as UMNO, led by Mukhriz Mahathir, the son of the former Prime Minister Mahathir Mohamad, won a majority in the assembly.

== Personal life ==
Azizan had 14 children from two marriages. He is a graduate of Al-Azhar University and the University of Kent, and a former head of the sharia law department of the National University of Malaysia. He conversed fluently in Malay, English, Tagalog and Arabic.

== Death ==
Azizan died on 26 September 2013 at the Sultanah Bahiyah Hospital's intensive care unit due to weakening health. He was 68 years old.

== Election results ==
Kedah State Legislative Assembly
Year	Constituency	Candidate	Votes	Pct	Opponent(s)	Votes	Pct	Ballots cast	Majority	Turnout
1995	N20 Sala	Azizan Abdul Razak (PAS)			Ahmad Awang (UMNO)					
1999	N20 Sala	Azizan Abdul Razak (PAS)	10,305	57.29%	Hidzir Alias (UMNO)	7,684	42.71%	18,295	2,621	79.50%
2004	N20 Sungai Limau	Azizan Abdul Razak (PAS)	10,882	52.61%	Mohd Suhaimi Abdullah (UMNO)	9,802	47.39%	20,952	1,080	84.42%
2008	N20 Sungai Limau	Azizan Abdul Razak (PAS)	12,028	57.70%	Basorri Abu Hassan (UMNO)	8,816	42.30%	21,171	3,212	84.05%
2013	N20 Sungai Limau	Azizan Abdul Razak (PAS)	13,294	55.40%	Mohd Fadzillah Mohd Ali (UMNO)	10,520	43.84%	24,406	2,774	89.40%
2013	N20 Sungai Limau	Azizan Abdul Razak (PAS)	13,294	55.40%	Sobri Ahmad (IND)	100	0.42%	24,406	2,774	89.40%
2013	N20 Sungai Limau	Azizan Abdul Razak (PAS)	13,294	55.40%	Abdullah Hashim (IND)	84	0.35%	24,406	2,774	89.40%

== Honours ==
=== Honours of Malaysia ===
- Malaysia
  - Commander of the Order of Loyalty to the Crown of Malaysia (PSM) – Tan Sri (2013)
- Kedah
  - Grand Commander of the Order of Loyalty to Sultan Abdul Halim Mu'adzam Shah (SHMS) – Dato' Seri Diraja (2011)
  - Knight Grand Commander of the Order of the Crown of Kedah (SPMK) – Dato' Seri (2008)
  - Justice of the Peace (JP) (2010)

Political offices
Preceded by Mahdzir bin Khalid	Menteri Besar of Kedah; 9 March 2008 – 6 May 2013	Succeeded by Mukhriz Mahathir
