= 2008 Kedah state election =

Malaysian state legislative election

- 8 March 2008

All 36 seats in the Kedah State Legislative Assembly 19 seats needed for a majority
- Registered: 2,937,490
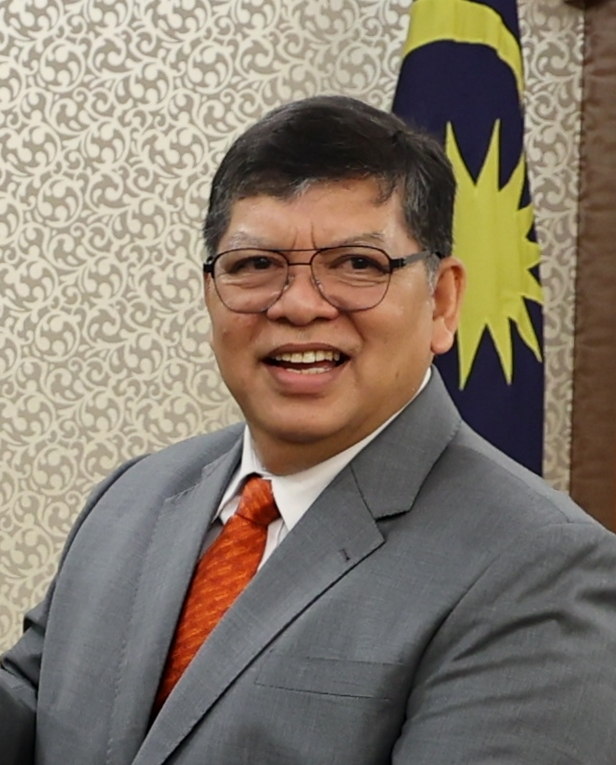

	Majority party	Minority party	Third party
Leader	Azizan Abdul Razak	Mahdzir Khalid	Johari Abdul
Party	PAS	UMNO	PKR
Alliance	DAP-PAS-PKR coalition (informal)	Barisan Nasional	DAP-PAS-PKR coalition (informal)
Leader since	2003	2005	2007
Leader's seat	Sungai Limau	Pedu	Not contesting
Last election	5	31	0
Seats won	16	14	4
Seat change	▲11	▼17	▲4
Popular vote	249,968	322,358 (Note: All the figures of votes and seats are a combined result of all the component parties in BN.)	85,223
Percentage	36.76%	47.40%	12.53%
Swing	▲4.24	▼12.33	▲5.21
	Fourth party
Leader	Liew Kard Seong
Party	DAP
Alliance	DAP-PAS-PKR coalition (informal)
Leader since	2006
Leader's seat	Not contesting
Last election	0
Seats won	1
Seat change	▲1
Popular vote	7,510
Percentage	1.10%
Swing	▲0.67
Menteri Besar before election
Mahdzir Khalid
Barisan Nasional (UMNO)
Elected Menteri Besar
Azizan Abdul Razak
Pakatan Rakyat (PAS)

The 12th Kedah state election was held on 8 March 2008. Polling took place in 36 constituencies throughout the Malaysian state of Kedah, with each electing a State Assemblyman to the Kedah State Legislative Assembly. The election was conducted by the Malaysian Election Commission. The state election was held concurrently with the 2008 Malaysian general election.

In a historic result, the incumbent government from Barisan Nasional (BN) was handed an unprecedented and shocking defeat by the opposition, the first time Kedah's ruling party from BN or is predecessor Alliance Party was voted out of power since the start of the state elections in 1955. The informal coalition of Democratic Action Party (DAP), Parti Islam Se-Malaysia (PAS) and Parti Keadilan Rakyat (PKR) won 21 seats out of the 36 seats, gaining a simple majority in the Kedah State Legislative Assembly.

== Results ==
Party or alliance		Votes	%	Seats	+/–
Pakatan Rakyat	Pan-Malaysian Islamic Party	249,968	36.76	16	+11
Pakatan Rakyat	People's Justice Party	85,223	12.53	4	+4
Pakatan Rakyat	Democratic Action Party	7,510	1.10	1	+1
Pakatan Rakyat	Total	342,701	50.39	21	+16
Barisan Nasional	United Malays National Organisation	259,940	38.22	12	–11
Barisan Nasional	Malaysian Chinese Association	31,674	4.66	1	–3
Barisan Nasional	Parti Gerakan Rakyat Malaysia	12,368	1.82	1	–1
Barisan Nasional	Malaysian Indian Congress	18,376	2.70	0	–2
Barisan Nasional	Total	322,358	47.40	14	–17
Independents		14,990	2.20	1	+1
Total		680,049	100.00	36	0
Valid votes		680,049	97.51		
Invalid/blank votes		17,335	2.49		
Total votes		697,384	100.00		
Registered voters/turnout		873,674	79.82		
Source: ElectionData.MY

== Aftermath ==
As the party with the most seats in the winning DAP-PAS-PKR coalition, PAS has the priority in choosing the new Menteri Besar. Azizan Abdul Razak, the PAS Kedah Commissioner and MLA for Sungai Limau, was selected by the coalition to be its candidate, and were sworn in on the next day, in front of the Sultan of Kedah. The EXCO members consisting of 7 PAS MLA and 3 PKR MLA, were sworn in on 12 March; the sole MLA from DAP, the other party in the coalition, was excluded.

The sole independent candidate who won the Bukit Selambau seat, V. Arumugam joined PKR days after the election, bringing the PKR MLAs to 5 and total MLA in the DAP-PAS-PKR coalition to 22. But in 2009, Arumugam resigned from his state seat, triggering the 2009 Bukit Selambau by-election; PKR retained the seat by winning the by-election.

The DAP-PKR-PAS coalition were later known as Pakatan Rakyat from 1 April 2008.
