= Order of the Crown of Kedah =

Order of the Crown of Kedah Darjah Yang Maha Mulia Sri Mahkota Kedah

Awarded by Sultan of Kedah
- Type: Order
- Status: Currently constituted
- Sovereign: Sallehuddin of Kedah
- Grades: Knight Grand Commander (SPMK), Knight Commander (DPMK), Companion (SMK), Member (AMK)

Precedence
- Next (higher): Glorious Order of the Crown of Kedah
- Next (lower): Order of Loyalty to the Royal House of Kedah
- Ribbon bar of the order

The Most Illustrious Order of the Crown of Kedah (Bahasa Melayu: Darjah Yang Maha Mulia Sri Mahkota Kedah) is an honorific order of the Sultanate of Kedah

== History ==
It was founded by Sultan Abdul Halim of Kedah on 21 February 1964.

== Classes ==
It is awarded in four classes:

- Grand Commander or Dato' Sri Paduka Mahkota Kedah - SPMK
  - The male titular has right to the prefix Dato' Seri and his wife, to the prefix Toh Puan
- Commander or Dato' Paduka Mahkota Kedah - DPMK
  - The male titular has right to the prefix Dato' and his wife, to the prefix Datin
- Companion or Setia Mahkota Kedah - SMK
- Member or Ahli Mahkota Kedah - AMK

Ribbon
SPMK	DPMK	SMK	AMK
Former ribbon pattern
.		.	.

== Award conditions ==
- Knight Grand Commander or Dato' Sri Paduka - SPMK.
  This Order is conferred on those of high position and standing who are well known for their excellence in the performance of their duties, in whatever field of service, to the State and the Nation. The recipient is dubbed with the title, "Dato' Seri". This is considered the highest Order, and it may be held by only 20 persons at one time.
- Knight Commander or Dato' Paduka - DPMK
  This Order ranks second to the Darjah Yang Mulia Seri Mahkota, and is conferred on those who have, for a number of years, performed meritorious deeds with great responsibility to the State and Nation. It is awarded to those of high position and great influence. Conferment of this Order is limited to 100 persons only. For government officers, this Order is only given to those in the Management and Professional level or those of similar status.

== Insignia ==
- Grand Commander or Dato' Seri - SPMK . Photo.
  The insignia is composed of a collar, a badge hanging from a sash and a breast star.
- Commander or Dato' - DPMK. Photos : Men & Women
  The former insignia was composed of a badge hanging from a sash with reversed colours to make a difference, and a breast star.
  The current insignia of a male titular is composed of a badge hanging from a collar sash and a breast star
  The current insignia of a female titular is composed of a badge hanging from a breast knot and a breast star
- Companion or Setia - SMK. Photos : Men & Women
  The insignia of a male titular is composed of a badge hanging from a collar sash.
  The insignia of a female titular is composed of a badge hanging from a breast knot.
- Member or Ahli - AMK. Photos : Kedah
  The insignia is composed of a badge hanging from a ribbon.

== Recipients ==
=== Grand Commander (SPMK) ===
- 1968: Syed Ahmad Shahabuddin
- 1969: Syed Sheh Barakbah
- 1985: Syed Nahar bin Tun Syed Sheh Shahabuddin
- 1989: Tunku Yaakob ibni Sultan Abdul Hamid
- 1997: Ahmad Zaidi Adruce
- 2008: Syed Hamid Albar
- 2008: Tunku Hajah Hamidah
- 2008: Azizan Abdul Razak
- 2014: Mukhriz Mahathir
- 2017: Sultan Sallehuddin, Sultan of Kedah (Grand Master since 2017)
- 2017: Tunku Sakinah
- 2018: Che Puan Muda Zaheeda Mohamad Ariff
- 2021: Muhammad Sanusi Md Nor
- Unknown: Abdul Rahman Ya'kub

=== Commander (DPMK) ===
- 1995: Abdul Ghani bin Abdullah
- 1995: Abdul Ghani bin Aziz
- 1996: Salmah Ismail
- 1997: Ismail Hassan
- 2005: Yaakub Mohammad
- 2005: Robaayah Zambahari
- 2005: Abdul Rahim Abdul Razak
- 2005: Rosli Mohd. Ali
- 2005: Jamil Osman
- 2005: Jamaludin L. Bakar
- 2006: Wan Adnan Muhamad
- 2006: Zainal Adzam Abd. Ghani
- 2006: Zainuddin Maidin
- 2007: Abdul Rahman Abdul Hamid
- 2007: Nordin Kardi
- 2007: Ibrahim bin Abu Shah
- 2008: Tunku Khatijah binti Tunku Abdul Rahman Putra Alhaj
- 2009: Zulkiple Kassim
- 2010: Abdul Aziz Ibrahim
- 2010: Abdul Manap Ibrahim
- 2010: Ahmad Hasbullah Mohd Nawawi
- 2010: Shahron Ibrahim
- 2011: Zalekha Hassan
- 2011: Mahdi Yusoff
- 2011: Ibrahim Bahari
- 2012: Othman Abd Razak
- 2013: Mohamad Zabidi Zainal
- 2013: Mohd Noor Daud
- 2013: Azizan Md Delin
- 2014: Ab. Ghani Ariffin
- 2014: Khalid Ramli
- 2015: Azemi Kasim
- 2015: Umi Kalsom Wan Awang
- 2015: Joseph Adaikalam
- 2016: Syeikh Abd Rahman Abdullah
- 2016: P. Kamalanathan
- 2016: Zamri Yahya
- 2016: Salleh Buang
