= 2013 Kedah state election =

Malaysian state legislative election

- 5 May 2013

All 36 seats in the Kedah State Legislative Assembly 19 seats needed for a majority
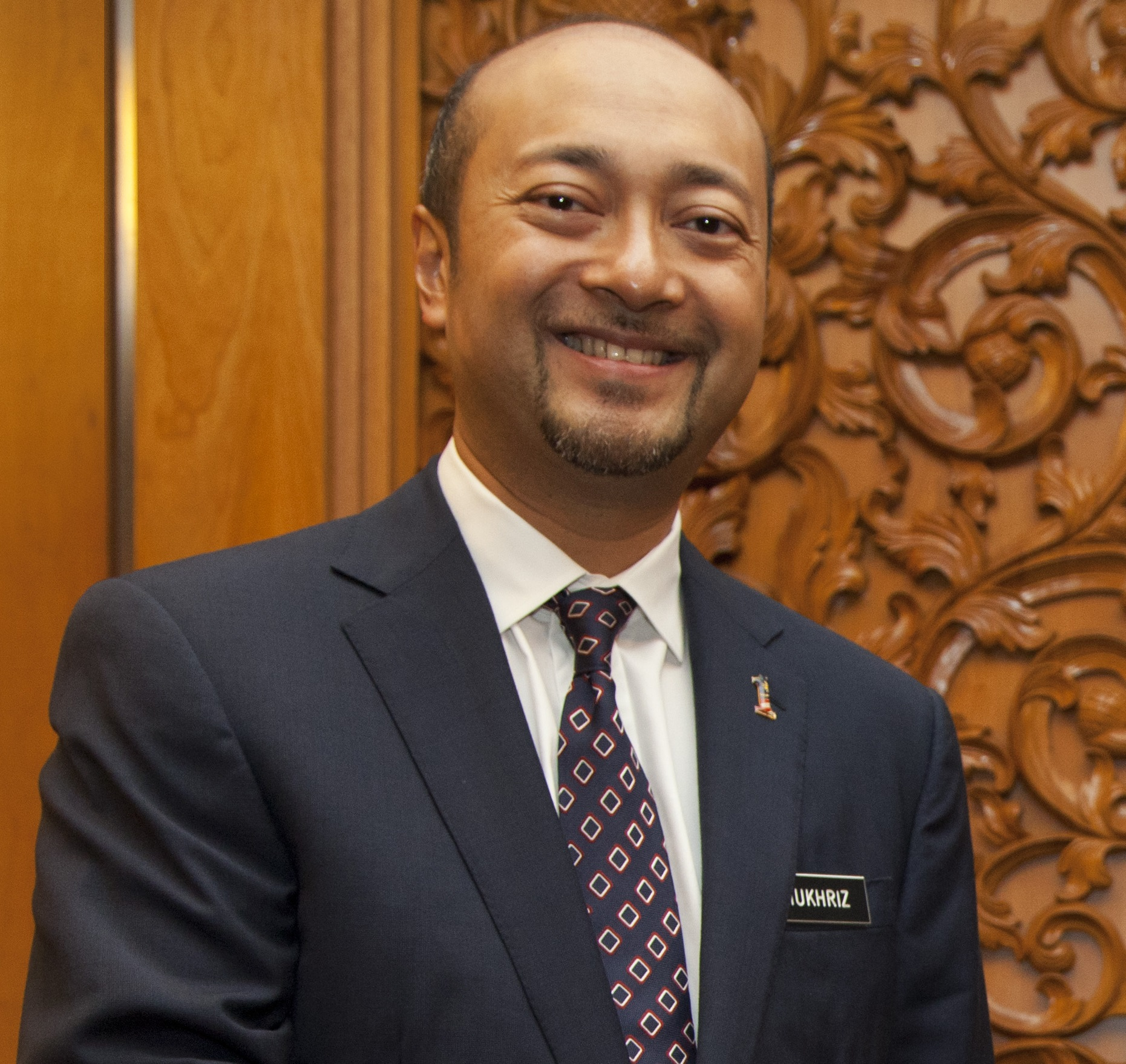

	Majority party	Minority party
Leader	Mukhriz Mahathir	Azizan Abdul Razak
Party	UMNO	PAS
Alliance	Barisan Nasional	Pakatan Rakyat
Leader since	2009	2003
Leader's seat	Ayer Hitam	Sungai Limau
Last election	14	21
Seats won	21	15
Seat change	▲7	▼6
Popular vote	449,278 (Note: All the figures of votes and seats are a combined result of all the component parties in BN.)	434,621
Percentage	50.37%	48.73%
Swing	▲2.97	▼1.66
Menteri Besar before election
Azizan Abdul Razak
Pakatan Rakyat (PAS)
Elected Menteri Besar
Mukhriz Mahathir
Barisan Nasional (UMNO)

The 13th Kedah state election was held on 5 May 2013. Polling took place in 36 constituencies throughout the Malaysian state of Kedah, with each electing a State Assemblyman to the Kedah State Legislative Assembly. The election was conducted by the Malaysian Election Commission. The state election was held concurrently with the 2013 Malaysian general election.

Barisan Nasional (BN), having lost the state for the first time in their history in the 2008 election, regains the state government after winning 21 of the 36 seats. Pakatan Rakyat (PR), the informal coalition of Democratic Action Party (DAP), Parti Islam Se-Malaysia (PAS) and Parti Keadilan Rakyat (PKR), won the remaining 15 seats to become the main opposition.

This election is the only time the DAP-PAS-PKR coalition is referred as Pakatan Rakyat during the Kedah state election campaign (although each party is contesting using their own name and logo), and also the final Kedah state election which the three parties works as a coalition; PR splits in 2015 due to disagreements between DAP and PAS.

== Results ==
Party or alliance		Votes	%	Seats	+/–
Barisan Nasional	United Malays National Organisation	449,278	50.37	19	+7
Barisan Nasional	Malaysian Chinese Association	449,278	50.37	2	+1
Barisan Nasional	Malaysian Indian Congress	449,278	50.37	0	0
Barisan Nasional	Parti Gerakan Rakyat Malaysia	449,278	50.37	0	–1
Barisan Nasional	Total	449,278	50.37	21	+7
Pakatan Rakyat	Pan-Malaysian Islamic Party	289,174	32.42	9	–7
Pakatan Rakyat	People's Justice Party	127,702	14.32	4	0
Pakatan Rakyat	Democratic Action Party	17,745	1.99	2	+1
Pakatan Rakyat	Total	434,621	48.73	15	-6
Pan-Malaysian Islamic Front		2,959	0.33	0	0
Malaysian United People's Party		192	0.02	0	0
People's Welfare Party		745	0.08	0	0
Independents		4,097	0.46	0	–1
Total		891,892	100.00	36	–
Valid votes		891,892	98.19		
Invalid/blank votes		16,477	1.81		
Total votes		908,369	100.00		
Registered voters/turnout		1,041,068	87.25		
Source: ElectionData.MY

== Aftermath ==
Mukhriz Mahathir, the UMNO and BN state chairman and MLA for Ayer Hitam, were sworn in as the new Kedah Menteri Besar on the next day, in front of the Sultan of Kedah. But on 3 February 2016, Mukhriz resigned as Menteri Besar after facing no-confidence vote in the state assembly, and were replaced by Ahmad Bashah Md Hanipah. Mukhriz later was sacked from UMNO on 24 June the same year, and together with his father Mahathir Mohamad and other sacked UMNO members formed Malaysian United Indigenous Party (PPBM/BERSATU) a month later.

The previous Menteri Besar and MLA for Sungai Limau, Azizan Abdul Razak died on 26 September 2013 due to internal organ failure and bacterial infection. His death triggered the 2013 Sungai Limau by-election, which were won by PAS candidate to retain the seat.

In 2015, the PR coalition was disbanded, due to disagreements between PAS and DAP over the former's insistence to implement the Islamic penal code, known as hudud, in the State of Kelantan. Also in 2015, a group of progressives in PAS led by Mohamad Sabu exits the party after losing in the party election, later forming National Trust Party (Amanah). Amanah joined forces with DAP and PKR in forming a successor coalition to PR, later known as Pakatan Harapan (PH) after PPBM/BERSATU joined the coalition in 2017. As a result of the split, PH were reduced to 6 seats in the state assembly, but later gained 3 seats after defection of 2 PAS MLA (Phahrolrazi Zawawi to Amanah, Amiruddin Hamzah to PPBM/BERSATU) and 1 UMNO MLA (Mukhriz to PPBM/BERSATU).
