= List of Malaysian State Assembly Representatives (2004–2008) =

Subnational legislature representatives

List of Malaysian State Assembly Representatives (1999–2004)
List of Malaysian State Assembly Representatives (2004–2008)
List of Malaysian State Assembly Representatives (2008–2013)

The following are the members of the Dewan Undangan Negeri or state assemblies, elected in the 2004 state election and by-elections. Also included is the list of the Sarawak state assembly members who were elected in 2006.

== Perlis ==
No.	State Constituency	Member	Party
BN 14 | PAS 1
N01	Titi Tinggi	Loh Yoon Foo	BN (MCA)
N02	Beseri	Zahidi Zainul Abidin	BN (UMNO)
N03	Chuping	Mansor Jusoh	BN (UMNO)
N04	Mata Ayer	Khairi Hasan	BN (UMNO)
N05	Santan	Sabry Ahmad	BN (UMNO)
N06	Bintong	Rusli Mat Husin	BN (UMNO)
N07	Sena	Azihani Ali	BN (UMNO)
N08	Indera Kayangan	Oui Ah Lan @ Ng Ah Lan	BN (MCA)
N09	Kuala Perlis	Bakar Saad	BN (UMNO)
N10	Kayang	Azam Rashid	BN (UMNO)
N11	Pauh	Abu Bakar Ismail	BN (UMNO)
N12	Tambun Tulang	Shahidan Kassim	BN (UMNO)
N13	Guar Sanji	Jafperi Othman	BN (UMNO)
N14	Simpang Empat	Zahari Bakar	BN (UMNO)
N15	Sanglang	Hashim Jasin	BA (PAS)

== Kedah ==
11th Kedah State Legislative Assembly
←	10th Assembly	12th Assembly	→

Overview
- Legislative body: Kedah State Legislative Assembly
- Jurisdiction: Kedah
- Meeting place: Wisma Darul Aman, Alor Setar
- Term: May 2004 – December 2007
- Election: 2004 state election
- Government: Kedah State Executive Council
- Website: mmk.kedah.gov.my
- Members: 36
- Speaker: Md Rozai Shafian
- Menteri Besar: Syed Razak Syed Zain Barakbah (until 22 December 2005); Mahdzir Khalid
- Opposition Leader: Azizan Abdul Razak
- Party control: Barisan Nasional

Sovereign
- Sultan: Sultan Abdul Halim Mu’adzam Shah

=== Elected members ===
No.	State Constituency	Member	Party
BN 31 | PAS 5
N01	Ayer Hangat	Md Hasan Bulat	BN (UMNO)
N02	Kuah	Nawawi Ahmad (EXCO Member)	BN (UMNO)
N03	Kota Siputeh	Abu Hasan Sarif	BN (UMNO)
N04	Ayer Hitam	Othman Aziz (EXCO Member)	BN (UMNO)
N05	Bukit Kayu Hitam	Khalidah Adibah Ayob (EXCO Member)	BN (UMNO)
N06	Jitra	Othman Ishak (EXCO Member)	BN (UMNO)
N07	Kuala Nerang	Affifudin Omar	BN (UMNO)
N08	Pedu	Mahdzir Khalid (Menteri Besar)	BN (UMNO)
N09	Bukit Lada	Ariffin Man	BN (UMNO)
N10	Bukit Pinang	Md Roshidi Osman	BA (PAS)
N11	Derga	Cheung Khai Yan	BN (Gerakan)
N12	Bakar Bata	Ahmad Bashah Md Hanipah (EXCO Member)	BN (UMNO)
N13	Kota Darul Aman	Chong Kau Chai @ Chong Itt Chew (EXCO Member)	BN (MCA)
N14	Alor Mengkudu	Fadzil Hanafi	BN (UMNO)
N15	Anak Bukit	Amiruddin Hamzah	BA (PAS)
N16	Kubang Rotan	Syed Razak Syed Zain Barakbah	BN (UMNO)
N17	Pengkalan Kundor	Mohd Jamil Md Idross	BN (UMNO)
N18	Tokai	Mohamed Taulan Mat Rasul	BA (PAS)
N19	Sungai Tiang	Suraya Yaacob	BN (UMNO)
N20	Sungai Limau	Azizan Abdul Razak (Opposition Leader)	BA (PAS)
N21	Guar Chempedak	Abdul Razak Hashim	BN (UMNO)
N22	Gurun	Beh Heng Seong	BN (MCA)
N23	Belantek	Mohd Isa Shafie	BA (PAS)
N24	Jeneri	Ismail Harun	BN (UMNO)
N25	Bukit Selambau	Saravanan Velia Udayar (EXCO Member)	BN (MIC)
N26	Tanjong Dawai	Arzmi Hamid	BN (UMNO)
N27	Pantai Merdeka	Shuib Saedin (EXCO Member)	BN (UMNO)
N28	Bakar Arang	Soon Kok Wah	BN (MCA)
N29	Sidam	Fong Chok Gin (EXCO Member)	BN (Gerakan)
N30	Bayu	Mohd Salleh Yaacob	BN (UMNO)
N31	Kupang	Ismail Abu Bakar	BN (UMNO)
N32	Kuala Ketil	Abd. Aziz Sheikh Fadzir	BN (UMNO)
N33	Merbau Pulas	Mohd Hadzir Ismail	BN (UMNO)
N34	Lunas	Ganesan Subramaniam	BN (MIC)
N35	Kulim	Boey Chin Gan	BN (MCA)
N36	Bandar Baharu	Azimi Daim (EXCO Member)	BN (UMNO)

=== Seating arrangement ===
Vacant	Vacant	Vacant	Vacant		Vacant	Vacant	Vacant	Vacant
Vacant	N30 Bayu	N31 Kupang	N32 Kuala Ketil		N01 Ayer Hangat	N21 Guar Chempedak	N22 Gurun	Vacant
	N28 Bakar Arang	N03 Kota Siputeh	N33 Merbau Pulas		N05 Bukit Kayu Hitam (EXCO Member)	N04 Ayer Hitam (EXCO Member)	N16 Kubang Rotan
Vacant		N14 Alor Mengkudu	C		B	N02 Kuah (EXCO Member)
Vacant	N26 Tanjong Dawai	N11 Derga	D	Sergeant-at-Arm	A	N06 Jitra (EXCO Member)	Vacant
Vacant	N24 Jeneri	N10 Bukit Pinang	D		A	N24 Sidam (EXCO Member)	N36 Bandar Baharu (EXCO Member)
Vacant	N19 Sungai Tiang	N15 Anak Bukit	D	the Mace	A	N25 Bukit Selambau (EXCO Member)	N27 Pantai Merdeka (EXCO Member)
Vacant	N09 Bukit Lada	N23 Belantek	D	the Mace	A	N13 Kota Darul Aman (EXCO Member)	State Financial Officer
N35 Kulim	N07 Kuala Nerang	N18 Tokai	D		A	N12 Bakar Bata (EXCO Member)	State Legal Advisor
N34 Lunas	N17 Pengkalan Kundor	N20 Sungai Limau (Opposition Leader)	D	Secretary	A	N08 Pedu (Menteri Besar)	State Secretary
				Speaker
				Sultan

== Kelantan ==
No.	State Constituency	Member	Party
PAS 23 | BN 22
N01	Pengkalan Kubor	Noor Zahidi Omar	BN (UMNO)
N02	Kelaboran	Mohamad Zaki Ibrahim	BA (PAS)
N03	Pasir Pekan	Ahmad Yaakob	BA (PAS)
N04	Wakaf Bharu	Mohd Rosdi Ab Aziz	BN (UMNO)
N05	Kijang	Husam Musa	BA (PAS)
N06	Chempaka	Nik Abdul Aziz Nik Mat	BA (PAS)
N07	Panchor	Nik Mohd. Amar Nik Abdullah	BA (PAS)
N08	Tanjong Mas	Rohani Ibrahim	BA (PAS)
N09	Kota Lama	Anuar Tan Abdullah	BA (PAS)
N10	Bunut Payong	Takiyuddin Hassan	BA (PAS)
N11	Tendong	Mohd Fauzi Muhammad	BN (UMNO)
N12	Pengkalan Pasir	Hanafi Mamat from 6 December 2005	BN (UMNO)
N12	Pengkalan Pasir	Wan Abdul Aziz Wan Jaafar until 31 October 2005	BA (PAS)
N13	Chetok	Abdul Halim Abdul Rahman	BA (PAS)
N14	Meranti	Mohd. Nassuruddin Daud	BA (PAS)
N15	Gual Periok	Shaari Mat Hussain	BN (UMNO)
N16	Bukit Tuku	Mohd Zain Ismail	BN (UMNO)
N17	Salor	Buni Amin Hamzah	BA (PAS)
N18	Pasir Tumboh	Ahmad Baihaki Atiqullah	BA (PAS)
N19	Demit	Mohamed Daud	BA (PAS)
N20	Tawang	Hassan Mohamood	BA (PAS)
N21	Perupok	Omar Mohammed	BA (PAS)
N22	Jelawat	Ilias Husain	BN (UMNO)
N23	Melor	Azmi Ishak	BN (UMNO)
N24	Kadok	Shamsudin @ Mohamed Shukri Ab. Rahman	BA (PAS)
N25	Kok Lanas	Annuar Musa	BN (UMNO)
N26	Bukit Panau	Abdul Fattah Mahmood	BA (PAS)
N27	Gual Ipoh	Hashim Safin	BN (UMNO)
N28	Kemahang	Md. Anizam Ab. Rahman	BA (PAS)
N29	Selising	Amran Mat Nor	BN (UMNO)
N30	Limbongan	Zainuddin Awang Hamat	BA (PAS)
N31	Semerak	Kamarudin Md Nor	BN (UMNO)
N32	Gaal	Nik Mazian Nik Mohamad	BA (PAS)
N33	Pulai Chondong	Zulkifli Mamat	BA (PAS)
N34	Temangan	Hassan Muhamad	BA (PAS)
N35	Kemuning	Zakaria Yaacob	BA (PAS)
N36	Bukit Bunga	Mohd Adhan Kechik	BN (UMNO)
N37	Air Lanas	Mustapa Mohamed	BN (UMNO)
N38	Kuala Balah	Abd Aziz Derashid	BN (UMNO)
N39	Mengkebang	Azizzuddin Hussein	BN (UMNO)
N40	Guchil	Shamsul Ikhwan Ashari Azmi	BN (UMNO)
N41	Manek Urai	Mohamed Zulkepli Omar	BN (UMNO)
N42	Dabong	Razmi Ab Rahman	BN (UMNO)
N43	Nenggiri	Mat Yusoff Abdul Ghani	BN (UMNO)
N44	Paloh	Nozula Mat Diah	BN (UMNO)
N45	Galas	Mohamad Saufi Deraman	BN (UMNO)

== Terengganu ==
No.	State Constituency	Member	Party
BN 28 | PAS 4
N01	Kuala Besut	Abdullah Che Muda	BN (UMNO)
N02	Kota Putera	Wan Mohd Wan Hassan	BN (UMNO)
N03	Jertih	Idris Jusoh	BN (UMNO)
N04	Hulu Besut	Nawi Mohamad	BN (UMNO)
N05	Jabi	Ramlan Ali	BN (UMNO)
N06	Permaisuri	Mohd Jidin Shafee	BN (UMNO)
N07	Langkap	Asha'ari Idris	BN (UMNO)
N08	Batu Rakit	Khazan Che Mat	BN (UMNO)
N09	Tepuh	Muhammad Ramli Nuh	BN (UMNO)
N10	Teluk Pasu	Abdul Rahin Mohd Said	BN (UMNO)
N11	Seberang Takir	Mohd Shapian Ali	BN (UMNO)
N12	Bukit Tunggal	Mohd Nasir Ibrahim Fikri	BN (UMNO)
N13	Wakaf Mempelam	Mohd Abdul Wahid Endut	BA (PAS)
N14	Bandar	Toh Chin Yaw	BN (MCA)
N15	Ladang	Wan Hisham	BN (UMNO)
N16	Batu Buruk	Wan Abd Muttalib @ Wan Musa Embong	BA (PAS)
N17	Alur Limbat	Alias Abdullah	BN (UMNO)
N18	Bukit Payung	Abdul Latiff Awang	BN (UMNO)
N19	Ru Rendang	Abdul Hadi Awang	BA (PAS)
N20	Pengkalan Berangan	Yahya Khatib Mohamad	BN (UMNO)
N21	Telemung	Rozi Mamat	BN (UMNO)
N22	Manir	Harun Taib	BA (PAS)
N23	Kuala Berang	Mohd Zawawi Ismail from 28 August 2004	BN (UMNO)
N23	Kuala Berang	Komaruddin Ab. Rahman until 25 July 2004	BN (UMNO)
N24	Ajil	Rosol Wahid	BN (UMNO)
N25	Bukit Besi	Din Adam	BN (UMNO)
N26	Rantau Abang	Za'abar Mohd Adib	BN (UMNO)
N27	Sura	Ahmad Kamal Abdullah	BN (UMNO)
N28	Paka	Mohd Ariffin Abdullah	BN (UMNO)
N29	Kemasik	Mohamad @ Abu Bakar Ali	BN (UMNO)
N30	Kijal	Ahmad Said	BN (UMNO)
N31	Cukai	Mohamad Awang Tera	BN (UMNO)
N32	Air Putih	Wan Ahmad Nizam Wan Abdul Hamid	BN (UMNO)

== Penang ==
No.	State Constituency	Member	Party
BN 38 | DAP 1 | PAS 1
N01	Penaga	Azhar Ibrahim	BN (UMNO)
N02	Bertam	Hilmi Abdul Rashid	BN (UMNO)
N03	Pinang Tunggal	Roslan Saidin	BN (UMNO)
N04	Permatang Berangan	Shabudin Yahaya	BN (UMNO)
N05	Sungai Dua	Jasmin Mohamed	BN (UMNO)
N06	Telok Ayer Tawar	Jahara Hamid	BN (UMNO)
N07	Sungai Puyu	Phee Boon Poh	DAP
N08	Bagan Jermal	Ooi Chuan Aik	BN (MCA)
N09	Bagan Dalam	Subbaiyah Palaniappan	BN (MIC)
N10	Seberang Jaya	Arif Shah Omar Shah	BN (UMNO)
N11	Permatang Pasir	Mohd Hamdan Abdul Rahman	BA (PAS)
N12	Penanti	Abdul Jalil Abdul Majid	BN (UMNO)
N13	Berapit	Lau Chiek Tuan	BN (MCA)
N14	Machang Bubok	Toh Kin Woon	BN (Gerakan)
N15	Padang Lalang	Tan Teik Cheng	BN (MCA)
N16	Perai	Rajapathy Kuppusamy	BN (MIC)
N17	Bukit Tengah	Ng Siew Lai	BN (Gerakan)
N18	Bukit Tambun	Lai Chew Hock	BN (Gerakan)
N19	Jawi	Tan Cheng Liang	BN (MCA)
N20	Sungai Bakap	Abd. Rashid Abdullah	BN (UMNO)
N21	Sungai Acheh	Mohd Foad Mat Isa	BN (UMNO)
N22	Tanjong Bunga	Koh Tsu Koon	BN (Gerakan)
N23	Air Puteh	Lye Siew Weng	BN (MCA)
N24	Kebun Bunga	Quah Kooi Heong	BN (Gerakan)
N25	Pulau Tikus	Teng Hock Nan	BN (Gerakan)
N26	Padang Kota	Teng Chang Yeow	BN (Gerakan)
N27	Pengkalan Kota	Lee Hack Teik	BN (MCA)
N28	Komtar	Lim Gim Soon	BN (MCA)
N29	Datok Keramat	Ong Thean Lye	BN (Gerakan)
N30	Sungai Pinang	Looi Swee Cheang	BN (Gerakan)
N31	Batu Lancang	Ng Fook On	BN (Gerakan)
N32	Seri Delima	Koay Kar Huah	BN (MCA)
N33	Air Itam	Cheang Chee Gooi	BN (Gerakan)
N34	Paya Terubong	Loh Hock Hun	BN (MCA)
N35	Batu Uban	Goh Kheng Sneah	BN (Gerakan)
N36	Pantai Jerejak	Wong Mun Hoe	BN (Gerakan)
N37	Batu Maung	Mansor Musa	BN (UMNO)
N38	Bayan Lepas	Syed Amerruddin Syed Ahmad	BN (UMNO)
N39	Pulau Betong	Muhammad Farid Saad	BN (UMNO)
N40	Telok Bahang	Siti Faridah Arshad	BN (UMNO)

== Perak ==
No.	State Constituency	Member	Party
BN 52 | DAP 7
N01	Pengkalan Hulu	Tajol Rosli Mohd Ghazali	BN (UMNO)
N02	Temengor	Hasbullah Osman	BN (UMNO)
N03	Kenering	Mohd Tarmizi Idris	BN (UMNO)
N04	Kota Tampan	Saarani Mohamad	BN (UMNO)
N05	Selama	Mohamad Daud Mohd Yusoff	BN (UMNO)
N06	Kubu Gajah	Mohd Jafri Mohd Yunus	BN (UMNO)
N07	Batu Kurau	Mohd Najmuddin Elias	BN (UMNO)
N08	Titi Serong	Abu Bakar Mat Ali	BN (UMNO)
N09	Kuala Kurau	Mohd Salleh Mat Disa	BN (UMNO)
N10	Alor Pongsu	Sham Mat Sahat	BN (UMNO)
N11	Gunong Semanggol	Abd Muhaimin Rahman Nazri	BN (UMNO)
N12	Selinsing	Zaili Cha	BN (UMNO)
N13	Kuala Sapetang	See Tean Seng	BN (Gerakan)
N14	Changkat Jering	Mat Isa Ismail	BN (UMNO)
N15	Trong	Rosli Husin	BN (UMNO)
N16	Kamunting	Abdul Malek Mohamed Hanafiah	BN (UMNO)
N17	Pokok Assam	Ho Cheng Wang	BN (MCA)
N18	Aulong	Ng Chii Fa	BN (Gerakan)
N19	Chenderoh	Siti Salmah Mat Jusak	BN (UMNO)
N20	Lubok Merbau	Jamal Nasir Rasdi	BN (UMNO)
N21	Lintang	Ahamad Pakeh Adam	BN (UMNO)
N22	Jalong	Chang Ko Youn	BN (Gerakan)
N23	Manjoi	Nadzri Ismail	BN (UMNO)
N24	Hulu Kinta	Mazidah Zakaria	BN (UMNO)
N25	Canning	Vincent Hooi Wy Hon	BN (Gerakan)
N26	Tebing Tinggi	Chew Wai Khoon	BN (MCA)
N27	Pasir Pinji	Su Keong Siong	DAP
N28	Bercham	Gooi Seng Teik	BN (MCA)
N29	Kepayang	Tan Chin Meng	BN (MCA)
N30	Buntong	Yik Phooi Hong	BN (MCA)
N31	Jelapang	Hee Yit Foong	DAP
N32	Menglembu	Keong Meng Sing	DAP
N33	Tronoh	Lee Kon Yin	BN (MCA)
N34	Bukit Chandan	Ahmad Jaafar	BN (UMNO)
N35	Manong	Ramly Zahari	BN (UMNO)
N36	Pengkalan Baharu	Hamdi Abu Bakar	BN (UMNO)
N37	Pantai Remis	Nga Kor Ming	DAP
N38	Belanja	Mohd Zaim Abu Hassan	BN (UMNO)
N39	Bota	Che Ri Md Daud	BN (UMNO)
N40	Malim Nawar	Lee Chee Leong	BN (MCA)
N41	Keranji	Chen Fook Chye	DAP
N42	Tualang Sekah	Mohd Radzi Manan	BN (UMNO)
N43	Sungai Rapat	Hamidah Osman	BN (UMNO)
N44	Simpang Pulai	Chan Chin Chee	BN (MCA)
N45	Teja	Ho Wai Cheong	BN (MCA)
N46	Chenderiang	Chang Kon You	BN (MCA)
N47	Ayer Kuning	Samsudin Abu Hassan	BN (UMNO)
N48	Sungai Manik	Ibrahim Katop	BN (UMNO)
N49	Kampong Gajah	Tajuddin Abdul Rahman	BN (UMNO)
N50	Sitiawan	Ngeh Koo Ham	DAP
N51	Pasir Panjang	Ramachandran Mookiah	BN (MIC)
N52	Pangkor	Zambry Abdul Kadir	BN (UMNO)
N53	Rungkup	Sha'arani Mohamad	BN (UMNO)
N54	Hutan Melintang	Rajoo Govindasamy	BN (MIC)
N55	Pasir Bedamar	Seah Leong Peng	DAP
N56	Changkat Jong	Onn Hamzah	BN (UMNO)
N57	Sungkai	Ganesan Retanam	BN (MIC)
N58	Slim	Mohd. Khusairi Abdul Talib	BN (UMNO)
N59	Behrang	Appalannaidu Rajoo	BN (MIC)

== Pahang ==
No.	State Constituency	Member	Party
BN 42 | DAP 2
N01	Tanah Rata	Choong Ching Yan	BN (MCA)
N02	Jelai	Wan Rosdy Wan Ismail	BN (UMNO)
N03	Padang Tengku	Abdul Rahman Mohamad	BN (UMNO)
N04	Cheka	Fong Koong Fuee	BN (MCA)
N05	Benta	Mohd. Soffi Abd. Razak	BN (UMNO)
N06	Batu Talam	Abd. Aziz Mat Kiram from 28 January 2007	BN (UMNO)
N06	Batu Talam	Tengku Paris Tengku Razlan until 27 December 2006	BN (UMNO)
N07	Tras	Leong Mee Meng	DAP
N08	Dong	Shahiruddin Ab Moin	BN (UMNO)
N09	Tahan	Ahmad Jaafar	BN (UMNO)
N10	Damak	Lau Lee	BN (MCA)
N11	Pulau Tawar	Ahmad Shukri Ismail	BN (UMNO)
N12	Beserah	Fisar Abdullah	BN (UMNO)
N13	Semambu	Pang Tsu Ming	BN (MCA)
N14	Teruntum	Ti Lian Ker	BN (MCA)
N15	Tanjung Lumpur	Nasharuddin Zainuddin	BN (UMNO)
N16	Inderapura	Shafik Fauzan Sharif	BN (UMNO)
N17	Sungai Lembing	Md Sohaimi Mohamed Shah	BN (UMNO)
N18	Lepar	Ahmad Tajuddin Sulaiman	BN (UMNO)
N19	Panching	Abdul Manan Ismail	BN (UMNO)
N20	Pulau Manis	Ariff Sabri Abdul Aziz	BN (UMNO)
N21	Peramu Jaya	Wan Iqbal Afdza Wan Abdul Hamid	BN (UMNO)
N22	Bebar	Ishak Muhamad	BN (UMNO)
N23	Chini	Abu Bakar Harun	BN (UMNO)
N24	Luit	Ahmad Munawar Abdul Jalil	BN (UMNO)
N25	Kuala Sentul	Rosni Zahari	BN (UMNO)
N26	Chenor	Tan Mohd Aminuddin Ishak	BN (UMNO)
N27	Jenderak	Mohamed Jaafar	BN (UMNO)
N28	Kerdau	Redzwan Harun	BN (UMNO)
N29	Jengka	Abdul Rahman Ibrahim	BN (UMNO)
N30	Mentakab	Chuah Boon Seong	BN (MCA)
N31	Lanchang	Mohd Sharkar Shamsudin	BN (UMNO)
N32	Kuala Semantan	Md. Hamdan Sudin	BN (UMNO)
N33	Bilut	Hoh Khai Mun	BN (MCA)
N34	Ketari	Ng Keong Chye	BN (Gerakan)
N35	Sabai	Davendran Murthy	BN (MIC)
N36	Pelangai	Adnan Yaakob	BN (UMNO)
N37	Guai	Hamzah Ibrahim	BN (UMNO)
N38	Triang	Leong Ngah Ngah	DAP
N39	Kemayan	Mohd Hayani Abdul Rahman	BN (UMNO)
N40	Bukit Ibam	Mohamad Sahfri Ab Aziz	BN (UMNO)
N41	Muadzam Shah	Maznah Mazlan	BN (UMNO)
N42	Tioman	Md Rusli Ismail	BN (UMNO)

== Selangor ==
No.	State constituency	Member	Party
BN 54 | DAP 2
N01	Sungai Air Tawar	Abdul Rahman Bakri	BN (UMNO)
N02	Sabak	Raja Ideris Raja Ahmad	BN (UMNO)
N03	Sungai Panjang	Mohamed Khir Toyo	BN (UMNO)
N04	Sekinchan	Ng Suee Lim	DAP
N05	Hulu Bernam	Mohamed Idris Abu Bakar	BN (UMNO)
N06	Kuala Kubu Baharu	Ch'ng Toh Eng	BN (MCA)
N07	Batang Kali	Zainal Abidin Sakom	BN (UMNO)
N08	Sungai Burong	Mohd Shamsudin Lias	BN (UMNO)
N09	Permatang	Abdul Aziz Mohd Noh	BN (UMNO)
N10	Bukit Melawati	Mohamed Sayuti Said	BN (UMNO)
N11	Ijok	Parthiban Karuppiah from 28 April 2007 (Note: Parthiban was elected to State Assembly in the Ijok by-election, 2007 following the death of Sivalingam Arumugam Karuppiah.)	BN (MIC)
N11	Ijok	Sivalingam Arumugam Karuppiah until 4 April 2007	BN (MIC)
N12	Jeram	Amiruddin Setro	BN (UMNO)
N13	Kuang	Soohaimi Abdul Rahman	BN (UMNO)
N14	Rawang	Tang See Hang	BN (MCA)
N15	Taman Templer	Ahmad Bhari Abd Rahman	BN (UMNO)
N16	Batu Caves	Jagarasah Verasamy	BN (MIC)
N17	Gombak Setia	Yuszahari Mohd Yusoff	BN (UMNO)
N18	Hulu Kelang	Ahmad Bujang	BN (UMNO)
N19	Bukit Antarabangsa	Azman Wahid	BN (UMNO)
N20	Lembah Jaya	Ismail Kijo	BN (UMNO)
N21	Chempaka	Mad Aris Mad Yusof	BN (UMNO)
N22	Teratai	Yap Soo Sun	BN (Gerakan)
N23	Dusun Tua	Rahmad Musa	BN (UMNO)
N24	Semenyih	Ahmad Kuris Mohd Nor	BN (UMNO)
N25	Kajang	Low Lee Leng	BN (MCA)
N26	Bangi	Amran Kasimin	BN (UMNO)
N27	Balakong	Hoh Hee Lee	BN (MCA)
N28	Seri Kembangan	Liew Yuen Keong	BN (MCA)
N29	Seri Serdang	Mohamad Satim Diman	BN (UMNO)
N30	Kinrara	Kow Cheong Wei	BN (MCA)
N31	Subang Jaya	Lee Hwa Beng	BN (MCA)
N32	Seri Setia	Seripah Noli Syed Hussin	BN (UMNO)
N33	Taman Medan	Ab Wahab Ibrahim	BN (UMNO)
N34	Bukit Gasing	Lim Thuang Seng	BN (Gerakan)
N35	Kampung Tunku	Wong Sai Hou	BN (MCA)
N36	Damansara Utama	Lim Choon Kin	BN (MCA)
N37	Bukit Lanjan	Yong Dai Ying	BN (Gerakan)
N38	Paya Jaras	Muhammad Bushro Mat Johor	BN (UMNO)
N39	Kota Damansara	Mohd Mokhtar Ahmad Dahlan	BN (UMNO)
N40	Kota Anggerik	Ahmad Nawawi M. Zin	BN (UMNO)
N41	Batu Tiga	Salamon Selamat	BN (UMNO)
N42	Meru	Jaei Ismail	BN (UMNO)
N43	Sementa	Abd Rahman Palil	BN (UMNO)
N44	Sungai Pinang	Teng Chang Khim	DAP
N45	Selat Klang	Norliza Ahmad	BN (UMNO)
N46	Pelabuhan Klang	Zakaria Deros	BN (UMNO)
N47	Pandamaran	Teh Kim Poo	BN (MCA)
N48	Kota Alam Shah	Ching Su Chen	BN (Gerakan)
N49	Seri Andalas	Kamala Ganapathy	BN (MIC)
N50	Sri Muda	Amzah Umar	BN (UMNO)
N51	Sijangkang	Abdul Fatah Iskandar	BN (UMNO)
N52	Teluk Datuk	Ei Kim Hock	BN (MCA)
N53	Morib	Hasiman Sidom	BN (UMNO)
N54	Tanjong Sepat	Karim Mansor	BN (UMNO)
N55	Dengkil	Suhaimi Ghazali	BN (UMNO)
N56	Sungai Pelek	Liew Chee Khong @ Liew Chee Choong	BN (MCA)

== Negeri Sembilan ==
No.	State constituency	Member	Party
BN 34 | DAP 2
N01	Chennah	Lim Yong @ Lim Chen	BN (MCA)
N02	Pertang	Razak Mansor	BN (UMNO)
N03	Sungai Lui	Zainal Abidin Ahmad	BN (UMNO)
N04	Klawang	Jalaluddin Alias	BN (UMNO)
N05	Serting	Lilah Yasin	BN (UMNO)
N06	Palong	Aziz Shamsudin	BN (UMNO)
N07	Jeram Padang	Krishnan Letchumanan	BN (MIC)
N08	Bahau	Lim Fui Ming	DAP
N09	Lenggeng	Ishak Ismail	BN (UMNO)
N10	Nilai	Peter Lai Yit Fee	BN (MCA)
N11	Lobak	Anthony Loke Siew Fook	DAP
N12	Temiang	Lee Yuen Fong	BN (MCA)
N13	Sikamat	Md Yusop Harmain Shah	BN (UMNO)
N14	Ampangan	Zakaria Nordin	BN (UMNO)
N15	Juasseh	Mohammad Razi Kail	BN (UMNO)
N16	Seri Menanti	Ibrahim Jahaya	BN (UMNO)
N17	Senaling	Ismail Lasim	BN (UMNO)
N18	Pilah	Norhayati Omar	BN (UMNO)
N19	Johol	Roslan Mohd Yusof	BN (UMNO)
N20	Labu	Muhamad Sahlan Shaid	BN (UMNO)
N21	Bukit Kepayang	Chan Khee Voon	BN (Gerakan)
N22	Rahang	Yip Chee Kiong	BN (MCA)
N23	Mambau	Yu Chok Tow	BN (MCA)
N24	Senawang	Woo Ah Lek @ Woo Siak Chee	BN (Gerakan)
N25	Paroi	Bibi Sharliza Mohd Khalid	BN (UMNO)
N26	Chembong	Muhammad Rais Zainuddin	BN (UMNO)
N27	Rantau	Mohamad Hasan	BN (UMNO)
N28	Kota	Awaludin Said	BN (UMNO)
N29	Chuah	Foo Ming Chee	BN (MCA)
N30	Lukut	Yeow Chai Thiam	BN (MCA)
N31	Bagan Pinang	Mohd Faizal Ramli	BN (UMNO)
N32	Linggi	Ismail Taib	BN (UMNO)
N33	Port Dickson	Rajagopalu Thamotharapillay	BN (MIC)
N34	Gemas	Jamlus Aziz	BN (UMNO)
N35	Gemencheh	Mohd Kamil Abd Aziz	BN (UMNO)
N36	Repah	Gan Chin Yap	BN (MCA)

== Malacca ==
No.	State constituency	Member	Party
BN 26 | DAP 2
N01	Kuala Linggi	Abdul Rahman Palit	BN (UMNO)
N02	Tanjung Bidara	Ab Karim Sulaiman	BN (UMNO)
N03	Ayer Limau	Idderis Kassim	BN (UMNO)
N04	Lendu	Abd Haziz Abdul Gani	BN (UMNO)
N05	Taboh Naning	Nawi Ahmad	BN (UMNO)
N06	Rembia	Abdul Wahab Abdul Latip	BN (UMNO)
N07	Gadek	Abdul Ghafar Atan	BN (UMNO)
N08	Machap	Lai Meng Chong from 12 April 2007	BN (MCA)
N08	Machap	Poh Ah Tiam until 15 March 2007	BN (MCA)
N09	Durian Tunggal	Hamdin Abdollah	BN (UMNO)
N10	Asahan	Raghavan Raman	BN (MIC)
N11	Sungai Udang	Yaakub Md Amin	BN (UMNO)
N12	Pantai Kundor	Ab Rahaman Ab Karim	BN (UMNO)
N13	Paya Rumput	Tahir Hassan	BN (UMNO)
N14	Kelebang	Seet Har Cheow	BN (MCA)
N15	Bachang	Chua Peng Song	BN (Gerakan)
N16	Ayer Keroh	Seah Kwi Tong	BN (MCA)
N17	Bukit Baru	Mohd Ali Rustam	BN (UMNO)
N18	Ayer Molek	Md. Yunos Husin	BN (UMNO)
N19	Kesidang	Koh Nai Kwong	BN (MCA)
N20	Kota Laksamana	Betty Chew Gek Cheng	DAP
N21	Duyong	Gan Tian Loo	BN (MCA)
N22	Bandar Hilir	Goh Leong San	DAP
N23	Telok Mas	Amid Nordin	BN (UMNO)
N24	Bemban	Chong Tam On	BN (MCA)
N25	Rim	Ramlah Abas	BN (UMNO)
N26	Serkam	Ahmad Hamzah	BN (UMNO)
N27	Merlimau	Mohamad Hidhir Abu Hassan	BN (UMNO)
N28	Sungai Rambai	Abu Pit	BN (UMNO)

== Johor ==
No.	State constituency	Member	Party
BN 55 | PAS 1
N01	Buloh Kasap	Othman Jais	BN (UMNO)
N02	Jementah	Lee Hong Tee	BN (MCA)
N03	Pemanis	Lau Chin Hoon	BN (Gerakan)
N04	Kemelah	Ayub Rahmat	BN (UMNO)
N05	Tenang	Sulaiman Taha	BN (UMNO)
N06	Bekok	Tan Kok Hong	BN (MCA)
N07	Bukit Serampang	Tahir Mohd Taat	BN (UMNO)
N08	Jorak	Samat Aripin	BN (UMNO)
N09	Gambir	M Asojan Muniyandy	BN (MIC)
N10	Tangkak	Yap Chik Dong	BN (MCA)
N11	Serom	Abdul Ghani Othman	BN (UMNO)
N12	Bentayan	Lau Yee Wee	BN (MCA)
N13	Sungai Abong	Haris Salleh	BN (UMNO)
N14	Bukit Naning	Abdullah @ Md Khalid Md Ali	BN (UMNO)
N15	Maharani	Mohd Ismail Mohd Shah	BN (UMNO)
N16	Sungai Balang	Robia Kosai	BN (UMNO)
N17	Semerah	Ariss Samsudin	BN (UMNO)
N18	Sri Medan	Ahmad Zahri Jamil	BN (UMNO)
N19	Yong Peng	Lim Kee Moi	BN (MCA)
N20	Semarang	Samsolbari Jamali	BN (UMNO)
N21	Parit Yaani	Ng See Tiong	BN (MCA)
N22	Parit Raja	Aziz Kaprawi	BN (UMNO)
N23	Penggaram	Koh Chee Chai	BN (MCA)
N24	Senggarang	Mohd Ramli Md Kari	BA (PAS)
N25	Rengit	Ayub Jamil	BN (UMNO)
N26	Machap	Abd Hamid Abd Rahman	BN (UMNO)
N27	Layang-Layang	Onn Mohd Yassin	BN (UMNO)
N28	Mengkibol	Gan Ping Sieu	BN (MCA)
N29	Mahkota	Gapar Gorrohu	BN (UMNO)
N30	Paloh	Choong Ah Onn @ Chong Ah Owon	BN (MCA)
N31	Kahang	Ramis Subramaniam	BN (MIC)
N32	Endau	Zainal Abidin Osman	BN (UMNO)
N33	Tenggaroh	Krishnasamy Shiman	BN (MIC)
N34	Panti	Baderi Dasuki	BN (UMNO)
N35	Pasir Raja	Halimah Mohamed Sadique	BN (UMNO)
N36	Sedili	Abdul Rashid Abd. Mokhti	BN (UMNO)
N37	Johor Lama	Asiah Md Ariff	BN (UMNO)
N38	Penawar	Mohd 'Azam Razuan	BN (UMNO)
N39	Tanjong Surat	Harun Abdullah	BN (UMNO)
N40	Tiram	Maulizan Bujang	BN (UMNO)
N41	Puteri Wangsa	Abdul Halim Suleiman	BN (UMNO)
N42	Johor Jaya	Tan Cher Puk	BN (MCA)
N43	Permas	Paliksina Siwalinggam	BN (MIC)
N44	Tanjong Puteri	Ali Mohamed	BN (UMNO)
N45	Stulang	Freddie Lonh Hoo Min @ Long Ah Mui	BN (MCA)
N46	Pengkalan Rinting	Low Teh Hian	BN (MCA)
N47	Kempas	Osman Sapian	BN (UMNO)
N48	Skudai	Teo Eng Tee @ Teo Kok Chee	BN (Gerakan)
N49	Nusa Jaya	Abd Aziz Sapian	BN (UMNO)
N50	Bukit Permai	Zainal Abidin Jidin	BN (UMNO)
N51	Bukit Batu	Cheong Chin Liang	BN (Gerakan)
N52	Senai	Chun Yoon Fook	BN (MCA)
N53	Benut	Salehan Sungot	BN (UMNO)
N54	Pulai Sebatang	Tee Siew Kiong	BN (MCA)
N55	Pekan Nenas	Wee Jeck Seng	BN (MCA)
N56	Kukup	Jamaliah @ Jamilah Endan	BN (UMNO)

== Sabah ==
No.	State constituency	Member	Party
BN 59 | IND 1
N01	Banggi	Amir Kahar Mustapha	BN (UMNO)
N02	Tanjong Kapor	Chong Kah Kiat	BN (LDP)
N03	Pitas	Masrani Parman	BN (UMNO)
N04	Matunggong	Jornah Mozihim	BN (PBS)
N05	Tandek	Maximus Ongkili	BN (PBS)
N06	Tempasuk	Pandikar Amin Mulia	BN (UMNO)
N07	Kadamaian	Timbon @ Herbert Lagadan	BN (PBS)
N08	Usukan	Japlin Akim @ Abd Hamid	BN (UMNO)
N09	Tamparuli	Jahid @ Nordin Jahim	BN (PBS)
N10	Sulaman	Hajiji Noor	BN (UMNO)
N11	Kiulu	Lovis Rampas	BN (PBS)
N12	Karambunai	Jainab Ahmad	BN (UMNO)
N13	Inanam	Goh Chin Lok @ Johnny Goh	BN (PBS)
N14	Likas	Liew Teck Chan	BN (SAPP)
N15	Api-Api	Yee Moh Chai	BN (PBS)
N16	Luyang	Melanie Chia Chui Ket	BN (SAPP)
N17	Tanjong Aru	Edward Yong Oui Fah	BN (PBS)
N18	Petagas	Yahyah Hussin	BN (UMNO)
N19	Kapayan	Edward Khoo Keok Hai	BN (MCA)
N20	Moyog	Philip Benedict Lasimbang	BN (UPKO)
N21	Kawang	Ghulam Haidar Khan Bahadar	BN (UMNO)
N22	Pantai Manis	Abdul Rahim Ismail	BN (UMNO)
N23	Bongawan	Karim Bujang	BN (UMNO)
N24	Membakut	Mohd Arifin Mohd Arif	BN (UMNO)
N25	Klias	Lajim Ukin	BN (UMNO)
N26	Kuala Penyu	Johan @ Christopher O T Ghani	IND
N27	Lumadan	Sarinum Sadikun	BN (UMNO)
N28	Sindumin	Sapawi Ahmad	BN (UMNO)
N29	Kundasang	Joachim Gunsalam	BN (PBS)
N30	Karanaan	Masidi Manjun	BN (UMNO)
N31	Paginatan	Ewon Ebin	BN (UPKO)
N32	Tambunan	Joseph Pairin Kitingan	BN (PBS)
N33	Bingkor	Justin Guka	BN (UPKO)
N34	Liawan	Sairin Karno	BN (UMNO)
N35	Melalap	Radin Malleh	BN (PBS)
N36	Kemabong	Rubin Balang	BN (UMNO)
N37	Sook	Joseph Kurup	BN (PBRS)
N38	Nabawan	Bobbey Ah Fang Suan	BN (UPKO)
N39	Sugut	Surady Kayong	BN (UMNO)
N40	Labuk	Metah Asang	BN (PBS)
N41	Gum-Gum	Zakaria Mohd Edris	BN (UMNO)
N42	Sungai Sibuga	Musa Aman	BN (UMNO)
N43	Sekong	Samsudin Yahya	BN (UMNO)
N44	Karamunting	Wong Lien Tat	BN (LDP)
N45	Elopura	Au Kam Wah	BN (SAPP)
N46	Tanjong Papat	Raymond Tan Shu Kiah	BN (SAPP)
N47	Kuamut	Johnny @ Juni Intang	BN (UPKO)
N48	Sukau	Aklee Abass	BN (UMNO)
N49	Tungku	Mohd Suhaili Said	BN (UMNO)
N50	Lahad Datu	Nasrun Mansur	BN (UMNO)
N51	Kunak	Jasa Rauddah	BN (UMNO)
N52	Sulabayan	Mohd Lan Allani	BN (UMNO)
N53	Senallang	Nasir Sakaran	BN (UMNO)
N54	Bugaya	Basali Tarireh @ Basalie Ab Hamid	BN (UMNO)
N55	Balung	Syed Abas Syed Ali	BN (UMNO)
N56	Apas	Tawfiq Abu Bakar Titingan	BN (UMNO)
N57	Sri Tanjong	Samson Chin Chee Tsu	BN (PBS)
N58	Merotai	Liew Yun Fah	BN (LDP)
N59	Tanjong Batu	Md Kamil Mohd Kassim	BN (UMNO)
N60	Sebatik	Patawari Patawe	BN (UMNO)

== Sarawak ==
=== 2006–2011 ===
No.	State constituency	Member	Party
BN 62 | DAP 6 | PKR 1 | SNAP 1 | IND 1
N01	Opar	Ranum Mina	BN (SUPP)
N02	Tasik Biru	Peter Nansian Ngusie	BN (SPDP)
N03	Tanjong Datu	Adenan Satem	BN (PBB)
N04	Pantai Damai	Abdul Rahman Junaidi	BN (PBB)
N05	Demak Laut	Abang Draup Zamahari Abang Zen	BN (PBB)
N06	Tupong	Daud Abdul Rahman	BN (PBB)
N07	Samariang	Sharifah Hasidah Sayeed Aman Ghazali	BN (PBB)
N08	Satok	Abang Abdul Rahman Zohari Abang Openg	BN (PBB)
N09	Padungan	Dominique Ng Kim Ho	PKR
N10	Pending	Violet Yong Wui Wui	DAP
N11	Batu Lintang	Voon Lee Shan	DAP
N12	Kota Sentosa	Chong Chieng Jen	DAP
N13	Batu Kawah	Tan Joo Phoi	BN (SUPP)
N14	Asajaya	Abdul Karim Rahman Hamzah	BN (PBB)
N15	Muara Tuang	Mohamad Ali Mahmud	BN (PBB)
N16	Bengoh	Jerip Susil	BN (SUPP)
N17	Tarat	Roland Sagah Wee Inn	BN (PBB)
N18	Tebedu	Michael Manyin Jawong	BN (PBB)
N19	Kedup	Frederick Bayoi Manggie	BN (PBB)
N20	Sadong Jaya	Wan Abdul Wahab Wan Sanusi	BN (PBB)
N21	Simunjan	Mohd. Naroden Majais	BN (PBB)
N22	Sebuyau	Julaihi Narawi	BN (PBB)
N23	Lingga	Simoi Peri	BN (PBB)
N24	Beting Maro	Bolhassan Di	BN (PBB)
N25	Balai Ringin	Snowdan Lawan	BN (PRS)
N26	Bukit Begunan	Mong Dagang	BN (PRS)
N27	Simanggang	Francis Harden Hollis	BN (SUPP)
N28	Engkilili	Johnical Rayong Ngipa	SNAP
N29	Batang Air	Malcom Mussen Lamoh from 7 April 2009	BN (PRS)
N29	Batang Air	Dublin Unting Ingkot until 24 February 2009	BN (PRS)
N30	Saribas	Wahbi Junaidi	BN (PBB)
N31	Layar	Alfred Jabu Numpang	BN (PBB)
N32	Bukit Saban	Robert Lawson Chuat	BN (PBB)
N33	Kalaka	Abdul Wahab Aziz	BN (PBB)
N34	Krian	Peter Nyarok Entrie	BN (SPDP)
N35	Belawai	Hamden Ahmad	BN (PBB)
N36	Semop	Mohamad Asfia Awang Nassar	BN (PBB)
N37	Daro	Murni Suhaili	BN (PBB)
N38	Jemoreng	Abu Seman Jahwie	BN (PBB)
N39	Repok	David Teng Lung Chi	BN (SUPP)
N40	Meradong	Ting Tze Fui	DAP
N41	Pakan	William Mawan Ikom	BN (SPDP)
N42	Meluan	Wong Judat	BN (SPDP)
N43	Ngemah	Gabriel Adit Demong	IND
N44	Machan	Gramong Juna	BN (PBB)
N45	Bukit Assek	Wong Ho Leng	DAP
N46	Dudong	Soon Choon Teck	BN (SUPP)
N47	Bawang Assan	Wong Soon Koh	BN (SUPP)
N48	Pelawan	Vincent Goh Chung Siong	BN (SUPP)
N49	Nangka	Awang Bemee Awang Ali Basah	BN (PBB)
N50	Dalat	Fatimah Abdullah	BN (PBB)
N51	Balingian	Abdul Taib Mahmud	BN (PBB)
N52	Tamin	Joseph Mauh Ikeh	BN (PRS)
N53	Kakus	John Sikie Tayai	BN (PRS)
N54	Pelagus	Larry Sng Wei Shien	BN (PRS)
N55	Katibas	Ambrose Blikau Enturan	BN (PBB)
N56	Baleh	James Jemut Masing	BN (PRS)
N57	Belaga	Liwan Lagang	BN (PRS)
N58	Jepak	Talib Zulpilip	BN (PBB)
N59	Kidurong	Chiew Chiu Sing	DAP
N60	Kemena	Stephen Rundi Utom	BN (PBB)
N61	Bekenu	Rosey Yunus	BN (SPDP)
N62	Lambir	Swin Jemaah @ Aidan Wing	BN (PBB)
N63	Piasau	George Chan Hong Nam	BN (SUPP)
N64	Pujut	Andy Chia Chu Fatt	BN (SUPP)
N65	Senadin	Lee Kim Shin	BN (SUPP)
N66	Marudi	Sylvester Entrie Muran	BN (SPDP)
N67	Telang Usan	Lihan Jok	BN (PBB)
N68	Bukit Kota	Abdul Rahman Ismail	BN (PBB)
N69	Batu Danau	Palu @ Paulus Gumbang	BN (SPDP)
N70	Ba'kelalan	Nelson Balang Rining	BN (SPDP)
N71	Bukit Sari	Awang Tengah Ali Hasan	BN (PBB)
