= Kedah State Executive Council =

Executive branch of the Kedah state government

- 2023–present
- Date formed: 14 August 2023

People and organisations
- Sultan of Kedah: Sallehuddin
- Menteri Besar: Muhammad Sanusi Md Nor (PN–PAS)
- Total no. of members: 11
- Member party: Perikatan Nasional (PN) government: Malaysian Islamic Party (PAS); Malaysian United Indigenous Party (BERSATU); Parti Gerakan Rakyat Malaysia (GERAKAN)
- Status in legislature: Coalition government 33 / 36
- Opposition parties: Pakatan Harapan (PH); People's Justice Party (PKR); Democratic Action Party (DAP)
- Opposition leader: Bau Wong Bau Ek (PH–PKR)

History
- Election: 2023 Kedah state election
- Legislature term: 15th

The Kedah State Executive Council is the executive branch of the State Government of Kedah, Malaysia. The Council is composed of the Menteri Besar, the Leader of the council, appointed by the Sultan on the basis that he/she commands the majority support in the Kedah State Legislative Assembly, (half of the number of the members of the assembly). The State Government of Kedah is also assisted by the State Secretary, the State Legal Adviser and the State Financial Officer.

This Council is similar in structure and role to the Cabinet of Malaysia, while being smaller in size. As federal and state responsibilities differ, there are a number of portfolios that differ between the federal and state governments.

Members of the Council are selected and nominated by the Menteri Besar, but appointed by the Sultan. The Council a number of committees; each committees will be chaired by the respective members, will take care of certain state affairs, activities and departments. Members of the Council are always the chair of a committee.

== Lists of full members ==
=== Muhammad Sanusi II EXCO (2023–present) ===
PN (11)
- PAS (7)
- BERSATU (2)
- GERAKAN (1)
- WAWASAN (1)

Members since 14 August 2023 have been :

Name	Portfolio	Party	Constituency	Term start	Term end
Muhammad Sanusi Md Nor (Menteri Besar)	State Planner; Land Affairs, Minerals and Geosciences; Earth Products; Finance; Government-Link Companies (GLCs); State Economic Action Council; Kedah Development 2035; External Cooperations	PAS	Jeneri	14 August 2023	Incumbent
Siti Ashah Ghazali	Rural Development; Poverty; Human Development	PAS	Merbau Pulas	21 August 2023	Incumbent
Mohd Azam Abd Samat	Education; Religious Affairs; Communications	PAS	Sungai Limau	21 August 2023	Incumbent
Haim Hilman Abdullah	Industry and Investment; Higher Education; Science, Technology and Innovation	PAS	Jitra	21 August 2023	Incumbent
Mohamad Yusoff Zakaria	Public Works; Natural Resources; Water Supply; Environment	PAS	Kuala Nerang	21 August 2023	Incumbent
Mansor Zakaria	Housing; Local Government; Health	PAS	Kuala Ketil	21 August 2023	Incumbent
Muhamad Radhi Mat Din	Consumerism; Living Costs; Youth and Sports	PAS	Alor Mengkudu	21 August 2023	Incumbent
Halimaton Shaadiah Saad	Women, Family and Society Wellness; Unity	BERSATU	Bukit Kayu Hitam	21 August 2023	Incumbent
Dzowahir Ab Ghani	Agriculture; Plantation; Transportation	WAWASAN	Suka Menanti	21 August 2023	Incumbent
Mohd Salleh Saidin	Tourism; Culture; Entrepreneurship	BERSATU	Kubang Rotan	21 August 2023	Incumbent
Wong Chia Zhen	Human Resources; Chinese, Indian and Siamese Affairs; Non-Governmental Organisations (NGO)	GERAKAN	Kulim	21 August 2023	Incumbent

=== Ex officio members ===
Position	Name
State Secretary	Norizan Khazali
State Legal Advisor	Nik Azhan Hakim Nik Mahmood
State Financial Officer	Khairol Anuar Syed Abidin

== Former compositions ==
=== Muhammad Sanusi I EXCO (2020–2023) ===
PN (11)
- PAS (6)
- BERSATU (5)

Members from 17 May 2020 to 14 August 2023 were :

Name	Portfolio	Party	Constituency	Term start	Term end
Muhammad Sanusi Md Nor (Menteri Besar)	State Economic Planner; State Planner; Land Affairs; Natural Resources and Revenue; Finance; Kedah Economic Council; Government-linked Companies (GLCs)	PAS	Jeneri	17 May 2020	14 August 2023
Dr. Ku Abdul Rahman Ku Ismail MP	Industry and Investment; Higher Education; Science Technology and Innovation	BERSATU	Guar Chempedak	20 May 2020	14 August 2023
Mohd Hayati Othman	Health; Local Government	PAS	Tokai	20 May 2020	14 August 2023
Azman Nasruddin MP	Agriculture and Food Industry; Plantation Industries and Commodities; Transport; Indian Community Affairs	BERSATU	Lunas	20 May 2020	14 August 2023
Suraya Yaacob	Works; Water Supply and Water Resources; Energy	UMNO	Sungai Tiang	20 May 2020	13 October 2022
Mohamad Yusoff Zakaria	Works; Water Supply and Water Resources; Irrigation and Drainage; Energy	PAS	Kuala Nerang	10 November 2022	14 August 2023
Siti Aishah Ghazali	Rural Development; Poverty Eradication; Human Development	PAS	Merbau Pulas	20 May 2020	14 August 2023
Halimaton Shaadiah Saad	Women, Family and Community Development; Welfare	BERSATU	Bukit Kayu Hitam	20 May 2020	14 August 2023
Wan Romani Wan Salim	Information; Communication and Multimedia; Domestic Trade and Consumer Affairs	PAS	Bukit Pinang	20 May 2020	14 August 2023
Najmi Ahmad	Religion; Education; Human Resources	PAS	Kupang	20 May 2020	14 August 2023
Mohd Firdaus Ahmad	Youth and Sports; Tourism, Arts and Culture; Entrepreneur and Cooperative Development	BERSATU	Kuah	20 May 2020	14 August 2023
Dr. Robert Ling Kui Ee	Housing; Environment; Unity; Chinese and Siamese Community Affairs	BERSATU	Sidam	20 May 2020	14 August 2023

=== Mukhriz II EXCO (2018–2020) ===
PH (11)
- PKR (4)
- AMANAH (3)
- BERSATU (3)
- DAP (1)

Members from 22 May 2018 to 17 May 2020 were :

Name	Portfolio	Party	Constituency	Term start	Term end
Mukhriz Mahathir (Menteri Besar)	State Economic Planner; State Planner; Land Affairs; Land Revenue Affairs (August 2018–May 2020); Land Products and Natural Resources (May 2018–August 2018); State Action Council; Finance (August 2018–May 2020)	BERSATU	Jitra	22 May 2018	17 May 2020
Amiruddin Hamzah	Finance; State-owned companies; Industry and Investment; Religion	BERSATU	Anak Bukit	22 May 2018	1 August 2018
Mohd Firdaus Ahmad	Information; Communication and Multimedia; Non-Governmental Organisations (NGOs)	BERSATU	Kuah	1 August 2018	17 May 2020
Ismail Salleh	Information (May 2018–August 2018); Health; Rural Development; Religion (August 2018–May 2020); State Government Related Companies (August 2018–May 2020)	AMANAH	Pengkalan Kundor	22 May 2018	17 May 2020
Tan Kok Yew	Tourism (May 2018–August 2018); Industry and Investment (August 2018–May 2020); Local Government; Housing	DAP	Derga	22 May 2018	17 May 2020
Zamri Yusuf	Science, Innovation and Information Technology (May 2018–August 2018); Public Works; Water Supply; Water Resources and Energy	PKR	Suka Menanti	22 May 2018	17 May 2020
Azman Nasrudin	Agriculture; Agro-based; Transport; Human Development (May 2018–August 2018); Primary Industries (August 2018–May 2020)	PKR	Lunas	22 May 2018	17 May 2020
Mohd Asmirul Anuar Aris	Youth and Sports; Tourism (August 2018–May 2020); Arts, Culture and Heritage (May 2018–August 2018) Culture (August 2018–May 2020); Entrepreneur Development; Non-Governmental Organisations (May 2018–August 2018)	AMANAH	Kubang Rotan	22 May 2018	17 May 2020
Ooi Tze Min	Chinese; Siamese Community Affairs; Science and Technology, Climate Change (August 2018–May 2020); Human Resources (May 2018–August 2018); Environment	PKR	Bakar Arang	22 May 2018	17 May 2020
Salmee Said	Education; Communication and High Technology (May 2018–August 2018); Domestic Trade (May 2018–August 2018); Human Resources (August 2018–May 2020)	AMANAH	Kota Siputeh	22 May 2018	17 May 2020
Summugam Rengasamy	Indian Community Affairs; Unity; Domestic Trade (August 2018–May 2020); Consumer Affairs; Cooperative (May 2018–August 2018)	PKR	Bukit Selambau	22 May 2018	17 May 2020
Halimaton Shaadiah Saad	Women Development (May 2018–August 2018); Women, Family and Community Development (August 2018–May 2020); Social Welfare (May 2018–August 2018); Welfare (August 2018–May 2020); Poverty Eradication	BERSATU	Bukit Kayu Hitam	22 May 2018	17 May 2020

=== Ahmad Bashah I EXCO (2016–2018) ===
BN (9)
- UMNO (8)
- MCA (1)

Members from 22 February 2016 to 10 May 2018 were :

Name	Portfolio	Party	Constituency	Term start	Term end
Ahmad Bashah Md Hanipah (Menteri Besar)	State Economic Planner; State Planner; Land Affairs; Land Products and Natural Resources; State Action Council; Finance; Government Owned Companies	UMNO	Bakar Bata	22 February 2016	10 May 2018
Ku Abdul Rahman Ku Ismail	Industry and Investment; Domestic Trade; Consumer Affairs; Cooperatives; Growth Triangle of Indonesia, Malaysia and Thailand (IMT-GT)	UMNO	Guar Chempedak	22 February 2016	10 May 2018
Badrol Hisham Hashim	Housing; Local Government; Water Supply; Water Resources and Energy	UMNO	Kuala Nerang	22 February 2016	10 May 2018
Mohd Rawi Abdul Hamid	Religion; Tourism and Heritage; Public Works	UMNO	Ayer Hangat	22 February 2016	10 May 2018
Leong Yong Kong	Environment; Chinese; Indian and Siamese Community Affairs; Health; Unity	MCA	Gurun	22 February 2016	10 May 2018
Aminuddin Omar	Youth and Sports; Arts and Culture; Human Development	UMNO	Jitra	22 February 2016	10 May 2018
Mohd Tajudin Abdullah	Information; Rural Development; Poverty Eradication	UMNO	Belantek	22 February 2016	10 May 2018
Norsabrina Mohd Noor	Science, Innovation and Information Technology; Communication and High Technology; Information Resources	UMNO	Bandar Baharu	22 February 2016	10 May 2018
Suraya Yaacob	Women's Development; Agriculture and Agro-Based; Development and Entrepreneurs; Social Welfare	UMNO	Sungai Tiang	22 February 2016	10 May 2018

=== Mukhriz I EXCO (2013–2016) ===
BN (9)
- UMNO (9)
- MCA (1)

Members from 15 May 2013 to 3 February 2016 were :

Name	Portfolio	Party	Constituency	Term start	Term end
Mukhriz Mahathir (Menteri Besar)	State Economic Planner; State Planner; Land Affairs; Earth (2013–2015); Land Products (2015–2016); Natural Resources; State Action Council; Finance; State-Owned Companies	UMNO	Ayer Hitam	15 May 2013	22 February 2016
Ku Abdul Rahman Ku Ismail	Industry and Investment; Domestic Trade; Consumer Affairs; Co-operatives	UMNO	Guar Chempedak	15 May 2013	22 February 2016
Suraya Yaacob	Women Development and Social Welfare (May 2013–2015) Women's Welfare (2015–February 2016); Agriculture; Agro-Based; Entrepreneur Development	UMNO	Sungai Tiang	15 May 2013	22 February 2016
Tajul Urus Mat Zain	Education; Transport; Public Works (May 2013–2015); Housing (2015–February 2016)	UMNO	Tanjong Dawai	15 May 2013	22 February 2016
Badrol Hisham Hashim	Local Government; Water Supply; Water Resources and Energy; Housing (May 2013–2015); Human Development (May 2013–2015); Non-Governmental Organisations (NGO) (2015–February 2016)	UMNO	Kuala Nerang	15 May 2013	22 February 2016
Mohd Rawi Abdul Hamid	Religion; Indian (May 2013–2015); Siamese Community Affairs; Human Resources (May 2013–2015); Tourism; Heritage (2015–February 2016); Public Works (2015–February 2016)	UMNO	Ayer Hangat	15 May 2013	22 February 2016
Mohd Tajudin Abdullah	Information; Rural Development; Poverty Eradication	UMNO	Belantek	15 May 2013	22 February 2016
Aminuddin Omar	Youth and Sports; Arts and Culture; Heritage (May 2013–2015); Non-Governmental Organisations (NGO) (May 2013–2015); Human Development (2015–February 2016)	UMNO	Jitra	15 May 2013	22 February 2016
Norsabrina Mohd Noor	Science, Innovation and Information Technology; Communication and High Technology; Information Resources (2015–February 2016)	UMNO	Bandar Baharu	15 May 2013	22 February 2016
Leong Yong Kong	Environment; Chinese Community Affairs; Indian (2015–February 2016); Heath; Unity	MCA	Gurun	2014	22 February 2016

=== Azizan EXCO (2008–2013) ===
PAS (8) PKR (3)

Members from 2008 to 2013 were :

Name	Portfolio	Party	Constituency	Term start	Term end
Azizan Abdul Razak (Menteri Besar)	Economic Planner; Land Affairs Planner; Products of the Earth; Natural Resources; State Action Council; Security; Religion; Finance	PAS	Sungai Limau	9 March 2008	6 May 2013
Phahrolrazi Mohd Zawawi	Housing (2011–?); Local Government (2011–?); Rural Development (2008–?); Entrepreneur (2008–?); Public works; Water Supply (2011–?); Water Resources (2011–?); Energy (2011–?)	PAS	Pengkalan Kundor	12 March 2008	6 May 2013
Mohamed Taulan Mat Rasul	Housing (2008–?); Local Government (2008–?); Religion (2009–?); Education (2009–?); Cooperatives (2009–?); Rural Development (2013); Poverty Eradication (2013)	PAS	Tokai	12 March 2008	2013
Amiruddin Hamzah	Industry and Investment (2008–2012); Agriculture; Science and Innovation (2008–2012); Agro-Based Industry (2012–2013); Biotechnology (2012–2013)	PAS	Anak Bukit	12 March 2008	6 May 2013
Hamdan Mohamed Khalib	Youth and Sports; Arts; Heritage; Culture	PAS	Tanjong Dawai	12 March 2008	6 May 2013
Abdullah Jusoh	Science; Innovation; Information Technology	PAS	Pantai Merdeka	12 March 2008	August 2009
Abdul Ghani Ahmad	Information; Entrepreneur Development	PAS	Ayer Hitam	March 2010	6 May 2013
Ismail Salleh	Health (2008–2010); Information; Technology (2010–2013); Communication (2010–2013); Non-Governmental Organisations (NGO); Science and Innovation (2010–2013); Human Development (2008–2010)	PAS	Alor Mengkudu	12 March 2008	6 May 2013
Siti Ashah Ghazali	Woman Development; Welfare	PAS	Merbau Pulas	12 March 2008	6 May 2013
Arumugam Vengatarakoo	Domestic Trade; Consumer Affairs; Siamese Community Affairs; Unity, Plantations Workers; Indian Community Affairs	PKR	Bukit Selambau	12 March 2008	April 2009
Manikumar Subramaniam	Domestic Trade; Consumer Affairs; Siamese Community Affairs; Unity, Plantations Workers; Indian Community Affairs	PKR	Bukit Selambau	August 2009	6 May 2013
Mohammad Radzhi Salleh	Tourism; Community Development; Human Resources	PKR	Lunas	12 March 2008	26 August 2009
Lim Soo Nee	Tourism; Community Development; Human Resources	PKR	Kulim	March 2010	6 May 2013
Tan Wei Shu	Environment; Chinese Community Affairs; Human Resources; Transport	PKR	Bakar Arang	12 March 2008	August 2009
Tan Chow Kang	Environment; Chinese Community Affairs; Transport	PKR	Sidam	March 2010	6 May 2013

=== Mahdzir EXCO (2005–2008) ===
BN (11)
- UMNO (8)
- MCA (1)
- MIC (1)
- Gerakan (1)

Members from 2005 to 2008 were :

Name	Portfolio	Party	Constituency	Term start	Term end
Mahdzir Khalid (Menteri Besar)		UMNO	Pedu	29 December 2005	2008
Othman Aziz		UMNO	Ayer Hitam	29 December 2005	2008
Ahmad Bashah Md Hanipah		UMNO	Bakar Bata	29 December 2005	2008
Othman Ishak		UMNO	Jitra	29 December 2005	2008
Shuib Saedin		UMNO	Pantai Merdeka	29 December 2005	2008
Nawawi Ahmad	Works; Energy; Environment	UMNO	Kuah	29 December 2005	2008
Azimi Daim	Education; Information Technology (2005–2007); Communication and Multimedia (2005–2007); Human Development (2007–2008)	UMNO	Bandar Baharu	29 December 2005	2008
Khalidah Adibah Ayob		UMNO	Bukit Kayu Hitam	29 December 2005	2008
Chong Itt Chew		MCA	Kota Darul Aman	29 December 2005	2008
Fong Chok Gin		Gerakan	Sidam	29 December 2005	2008
Saravanan Velia Udayar		MIC	Bukit Selambau	29 December 2005	2008

=== Syed Razak II EXCO (2004–2005) ===
BN (11)
- UMNO (8)
- MCA (1)
- MIC (1)
- Gerakan (1)

Members from 2004 to 2005 were :

Name	Portfolio	Party	Constituency	Term start	Term end
Syed Razak Syed Zain Barakbah (Menteri Besar)		UMNO	Kubang Rotan	2004	2005
Mahdzir Khalid		UMNO	Pedu	2004	2005
Ahmad Bashah Md Hanipah		UMNO	Bakar Bata	2004	2005
Othman Ishak		UMNO	Jitra	2004	2005
Shuib Saedin		UMNO	Pantai Merdeka	2004	2005
Nawawi Ahmad	Culture, Arts and Tourism	UMNO	Kuah	28 March 2004	29 December 2005
Azimi Daim	Education	UMNO	Bandar Baharu	28 March 2004	29 December 2005
Khalidah Adibah Ayob		UMNO	Bukit Kayu Hitam	2004	2005
Chong Itt Chew		MCA	Kota Darul Aman	2004	2005
Fong Chok Gin		Gerakan	Sidam	2004	2005
Saravanan Velia Udayar		MIC	Bukit Selambau	2004	2005

=== Syed Razak I EXCO (1999–2004) ===
BN (11)
- UMNO (8)
- MCA (1)
- MIC (1)
- Gerakan (1)

Members from 14 December 1999 to 2004 were :

Name	Portfolio	Party	Constituency	Term start	Term end
Syed Razak Syed Zain Barakbah (Menteri Besar)		UMNO	Kubang Rotan	11 December 1999	2004
Zainol Md Isa		UMNO	Bayu	14 December 1999	2004
Hassan Bulat		UMNO	Padang Mat Sirat	14 December 1999	2004
Fadzil Hanafi		UMNO	Tanjung Seri	14 December 1999	2004
Othman Ishak		UMNO	Jitra	14 December 1999	2004
Ahmad Bashah Md Hanipah		UMNO	Alor Merah	14 December 1999	2004
Rosnah Majid		UMNO	Tanjung Dawai	14 December 1999	2004
Othman Md Aji		UMNO	Bandar Baharu	14 December 1999	2004
Beh Heng Seong		MCA	Gurun	14 December 1999	2004
Saravanan Velia Udayar		MIC	Bukit Selambau	14 December 1999	2004
Fong Chok Gin		Gerakan	Sidam	14 December 1999	2004

== See also ==
- Sultan of Kedah
- Menteri Besar of Kedah
- Kedah State Legislative Assembly
