= Menteri Besar of Kedah =

Head of government of Kedah, Malaysia

- Coat of Arms of Kedah

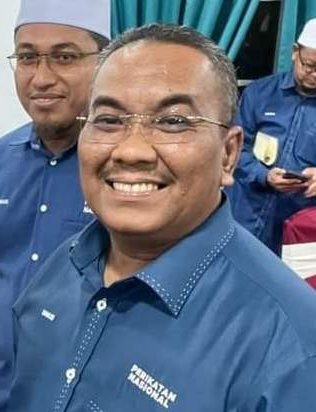
- Incumbent; Muhammad Sanusi Md Nor since 17 May 2020
- Government of Kedah
- Style: Yang Amat Berhormat (The Most Honourable)
- Status: Head of Government
- Member of: Kedah State Executive Council
- Reports to: Kedah State Legislative Assembly
- Residence: Seri Mentaloon, Alor Setar, Kedah
- Seat: Aras 3, Blok A, Wisma Darul Aman, 05503 Alor Setar, Kedah
- Appointer: Sallehuddin; Sultan of Kedah
- Term length: 5 years or lesser, renewable once (while commanding the confidence of the Kedah State Legislative Assembly With State Elections held no more than five years apart)
- Inaugural holder: Wan Shammiul Ahmad Wan Farriul Osman
- Formation: 1 March 1881; 145 years ago
- Deputy: Vacant
- Website: mmk.kedah.gov.my/index.php/kerajaan/menteri-besar

The Menteri Besar of Kedah or the First Minister of Kedah is the head of government in the Malaysian state of Kedah. According to convention, the Menteri Besar is the leader of the majority party or largest coalition party of the Kedah State Legislative Assembly.

== Appointment ==
According to the state constitution, the Sultan of Kedah shall first appoint the Menteri Besar to preside over the Executive Council and requires such Menteri Besar to be a member of the Legislative Assembly who in his judgment is likely to command the confidence of the majority of the members of the Assembly, must be an ethnic Malay who professes the religion of Islam and must not a Malaysian citizen by naturalisation or by registration. The Sultan on the Menteri Besar's advice shall appoint not more than ten nor less than four members from among the members of the Legislative Assembly.

The member of the Executive Council must take and subscribe in the presence of the Sultan the oath of office and allegiance as well as the oath of secrecy before they can exercise the functions of office. The Executive Council shall be collectively responsible to the Legislative Assembly. The members of the Executive Council shall not hold any office of profit and engage in any trade, business or profession that will cause conflict of interest.

If a government cannot get its appropriation (budget) legislation passed by the Legislative Assembly, or the Legislative Assembly passes a vote of "no confidence" in the government, the Menteri Besar is bound by convention to resign immediately. The Sultan's choice of replacement Menteri Besar will be dictated by the circumstances. A member of the Executive Council other than the Menteri Besar shall hold office during the pleasure of the Sultan, unless the appointment of any member of the Executive Council shall have been revoked by the Sultan on the advice of the Menteri Besar but may at any time resign his office.

Following a resignation in other circumstances, defeated in an election or the death of the Menteri Besar, the Sultan will generally appoint as Menteri Besar the person voted by the governing party as their new leader.

== Powers ==
The power of the Menteri Besar is subject to a number of limitations. Menteri Besar removed as leader of his or her party, or whose government loses a vote of no confidence in the Legislative Assembly, must advise a state election or resign the office or be dismissed by the Sultan. The defeat of a supply bill (one that concerns the spending of money) or unable to pass important policy-related legislation is seen to require the resignation of the government or dissolution of Legislative Assembly, much like a non-confidence vote, since a government that cannot spend money is hamstrung, also called loss of supply.

The Menteri Besar's party will normally have a majority in the Legislative Assembly and party discipline is exceptionally strong in Kedah politics, so passage of the government's legislation through the Legislative Assembly is mostly a formality.

== Official residence ==
The official residence of the Menteri Besar of Kedah is Seri Mentaloon located at Jalan Anak Bukit, Kampung Mentaloon, Alor Setar, Kedah, Malaysia.

== Caretaker Menteri Besar ==
The legislative assembly unless sooner dissolved by the Sultan with His Majesty's own discretion on the advice of the Menteri Besar shall continue for five years from the date of its first meeting. The state constitution permits a delay of 60 days of general election to be held from the date of dissolution and the legislative assembly shall be summoned to meet on a date not later than 120 days from the date of dissolution. Conventionally, between the dissolution of one legislative assembly and the convening of the next, the Menteri Besar and the executive council remain in office in a caretaker capacity.

== List of Menteris Besar of Kedah ==
The following is the list of Menteris Besar of Kedah since 1948:

Colour key (for political parties):
UMNO Alliance / Barisan Nasional Pakatan Rakyat Pakatan Harapan Perikatan Nasional

| No. | Portrait | Name (Birth–Death) Constituency | Term of office | | | Party (Note: This column names only the Menteri Besar's party. The state government he heads may be a complex coalition of several parties and independents; those are not listed here.) | Election | Assembly |
| No. | Portrait | Name (Birth–Death) Constituency | Took office | Left office | Time in office | Party | Election | Assembly |
|---|---|---|---|---|---|---|---|---|
| 1 | | Dato' Sir; Mohamad Sheriff Osman (1890–1962) | 1 February 1948 | January; 1954 | | UMNO | – | – |
| 1 | | Dato' Sir; Mohamad Sheriff Osman (1890–1962) | 1 February 1948 | January; 1954 | | Alliance (UMNO) | – | – |
| 2 | | Tunku Ismail Tunku Yahya (1907–1969) | January; 1954 | 24 May 1959 | | Alliance (UMNO) | – | – |
| 3 | | Syed Omar Syed Abdullah Shahabuddin (1902–1967); MLA for Baling Barat | 24 May 1959 | 7 December 1967 | 8 years, 198 days | Alliance (UMNO) | 1959 | 1st |
| 3 | | Syed Omar Syed Abdullah Shahabuddin (1902–1967); MLA for Baling Barat | 24 May 1959 | 7 December 1967 | 8 years, 198 days | Alliance (UMNO) | 1964 | 2nd |
| 4 | | Dato' Seri; Syed Ahmad Shahabuddin (1925–2008); MLA for Padang Terap (until 1974); MLA for Kuala Nerang (from 1974) | 14 December 1967 | 13 July 1978 | 10 years, 212 days | Alliance (UMNO) | – | 2nd |
| 4 | | Dato' Seri; Syed Ahmad Shahabuddin (1925–2008); MLA for Padang Terap (until 1974); MLA for Kuala Nerang (from 1974) | 14 December 1967 | 13 July 1978 | 10 years, 212 days | Alliance (UMNO) | 1969 | 3rd |
| 4 | | Dato' Seri; Syed Ahmad Shahabuddin (1925–2008); MLA for Padang Terap (until 1974); MLA for Kuala Nerang (from 1974) | 14 December 1967 | 13 July 1978 | 10 years, 212 days | BN (UMNO) | 1974 | 4th |
| 5 | | Syed Nahar Syed Sheh Shahabuddin (1934–1998); MLA for Langkawi | 13 July 1978 | 28 January 1985 | 6 years, 200 days | BN (UMNO) | 1978 | 5th |
| 5 | | Syed Nahar Syed Sheh Shahabuddin (1934–1998); MLA for Langkawi | 13 July 1978 | 28 January 1985 | 6 years, 200 days | BN (UMNO) | 1982 | 6th |
| 6 | | Tan Sri Dato' Seri; Osman Aroff (born 1940); MLA for Jitra | 28 January 1985 | 16 June 1996 | 11 years, 141 days | BN (UMNO) | – | 6th |
| 6 | | Tan Sri Dato' Seri; Osman Aroff (born 1940); MLA for Jitra | 28 January 1985 | 16 June 1996 | 11 years, 141 days | BN (UMNO) | 1986 | 7th |
| 6 | | Tan Sri Dato' Seri; Osman Aroff (born 1940); MLA for Jitra | 28 January 1985 | 16 June 1996 | 11 years, 141 days | BN (UMNO) | 1990 | 8th |
| 6 | | Tan Sri Dato' Seri; Osman Aroff (born 1940); MLA for Jitra | 28 January 1985 | 16 June 1996 | 11 years, 141 days | BN (UMNO) | 1995 | 9th |
| 7 | | Tan Sri Dato' Seri; Sanusi Junid (1942–2018); MLA for Kuah | 16 June 1996 | 11 December 1999 | 3 years, 179 days | BN (UMNO) | – | 9th |
| 8 | | Dato' Seri Utama; Syed Razak Syed Zain Barakbah (1944–2023); MLA for Kubang Rotan | 11 December 1999 | 22 December 2005 | 6 years, 12 days | BN (UMNO) | 1999 | 10th |
| 8 | | Dato' Seri Utama; Syed Razak Syed Zain Barakbah (1944–2023); MLA for Kubang Rotan | 11 December 1999 | 22 December 2005 | 6 years, 12 days | BN (UMNO) | 2004 | 11th |
| 9 | | Dato' Seri; Mahdzir Khalid (born 1960); MLA for Pedu | 28 December 2005 | 9 March 2008 | 2 years, 73 days | BN (UMNO) | – | 11th |
| 10 | | Dato' Seri Diraja; Azizan Abdul Razak (1944–2013); MLA for Sungai Limau | 9 March 2008 | 6 May 2013 | 5 years, 59 days | PR (PAS) | 2008 | 12th |
| 11 | | Dato' Seri; Mukhriz Mahathir (born 1964); MLA for Ayer Hitam | 6 May 2013 | 3 February 2016 | 2 years, 274 days | BN (UMNO) | 2013 | 13th |
| 12 | | Dato' Seri Diraja; Ahmad Bashah Md Hanipah (born 1950); MLA for Bakar Bata | 4 February 2016 | 10 May 2018 | 2 years, 96 days | BN (UMNO) | – | 13th |
| 13 | | Dato' Seri Utama; Mukhriz Mahathir (born 1964); MLA for Jitra | 11 May 2018 | 17 May 2020 | 2 years, 7 days | PH (BERSATU) | 2018 | 14th |
| 14 | | Dato' Seri Haji; Muhammad Sanusi Md Nor (born 1974); MLA for Jeneri | 17 May 2020 | Incumbent | 6 years, 136 days | PN (PAS) | – | 14th |
| 14 | | Dato' Seri Haji; Muhammad Sanusi Md Nor (born 1974); MLA for Jeneri | 17 May 2020 | Incumbent | 6 years, 136 days | PN (PAS) | 2023 | 15th |
