= Mohd Salleh Saidin =

Malaysian politician

Yang Berhormat Dato' Mohd Salleh Saidin DIMP DPSM MLA
- محمّد صالح سعيدين

Member of the Kedah State Executive Council

(Tourism, Culture and Entrepreneurship)
- Incumbent
- Assumed office 21 August 2023
- Monarch: Sallehuddin
- Menteri Besar: Muhammad Sanusi Md Nor
- Preceded by: Mohd Firdaus Ahmad
- Constituency: Kubang Rotan

Member of the Kedah State Legislative Assembly for Kubang Rotan
- Incumbent
- Assumed office 12 August 2023
- Preceded by: Mohd Asmirul Anuar Aris (PH–AMANAH)
- Majority: 10,786 (2023)

Personal details
- Born: Mohd Salleh bin Saidin Malaysia
- Citizenship: Malaysia
- Party: Malaysian United Indigenous Party (BERSATU)
- Other political affiliations: Perikatan Nasional (PN)
- Occupation: Politician

Mohd Salleh bin Saidin is a Malaysian politician who has served as Member of the Kedah State Executive Council (EXCO) in the Perikatan Nasional (PN) state administration under Menteri Besar Muhammad Sanusi Md Nor and Member of the Kedah State Legislative Assembly (MLA) for Kubang Rotan since August 2023. He is a member and the Division Chief of Kuala Kedah of the Malaysian United Indigenous Party (BERSATU), a component party of the PN coalition.

== Election results ==
Kedah State Legislative Assembly
Year	Constituency	Candidate	Votes	Pct	Opponent(s)	Votes	Pct	Ballots cast	Majority	Turnout
2023	N16 Kubang Rotan	Mohd Salleh Saidin (BERSATU)	22,951	65.36%	Mohd Asmirul Anuar Aris (AMANAH)	12,165	34.64%	35,294	10,786	70.26%

== Honours ==
- Malacca
  - Companion Class II of the Exalted Order of Malacca (DPSM) – Datuk (2016)
- Pahang
  - Knight Companion of the Order of the Crown of Pahang (DIMP) – Dato' (2014)
