= Seri Mentaloon =

- سري مينتلاون
- Interactive map of the Seri Mentaloon area

General information
- Status: Completed
- Type: Official residence
- Location: Jalan Anak Bukit, Kampung Mentaloon, Alor Setar, Kedah, Malaysia, Alor Setar, Kedah, Malaysia
- Coordinates: 6.1647°N 100.3677°E
- Current tenants: Menteri Besar of Kedah

Seri Mentaloon (Jawi: سري مينتلاون), otherwise known as Seri Mentaloon Kediaman Rasmi Menteri Besar and Seri Mentaloon Rumah Kediaman Rasmi Menteri Besar Kedah Darul Aman, is the official residence of Menteri Besar of Kedah. It is located at Jalan Anak Bukit, Kampung Mentaloon, Alor Setar, Kedah, Malaysia.

Among the Menteri Besar of Kedah who have lived there are Mahdzir Khalid (2005–2008), Azizan Abdul Razak (2008–2013), Mukhriz Mahathir (2013–2016, the first time), Ahmad Bashah Md Hanipah (2016–2018), Mukhriz Mahathir (2018–2020, the second time) and Muhammad Sanusi Md Nor (2020–present).

== See also ==
- Seri Perdana (The official residence of the Prime Minister of Malaysia)
