= Mohd Firdaus Ahmad =

Malaysian politician

Mohd Firdaus Ahmad SSS
- محمد فردوس بن أحمد

Member of the Kedah State Executive Council
- In office 20 May 2020 – 14 August 2023 (Tourism, Arts and Culture, Youth and Sports & Entrepreneurship Development)
- Monarch: Sallehuddin
- Menteri Besar: Muhammad Sanusi Md Nor
- Preceded by: Mohd Asmirul Anuar Aris (Tourism, Culture, Entrepreneur Development & Youth and Sports)
- Succeeded by: Mohd Salleh Saidin (Tourism, Culture & Entrepreneurship); Muhamad Radhi Mat Din (Youth and Sports); Portfolio abolished (Arts)
- Constituency: Kuah
- In office 1 August 2018 – 17 May 2020 (Information, Communication and Multimedia & Non-Governmental Organisations)
- Monarch: Sallehuddin
- Menteri Besar: Mukhriz Mahathir
- Preceded by: Ismail Salleh (Information); Salmee Said (Communication); Portfolio established (Multimedia); Mohd Asmirul Anuar Aris (Non-Governmental Organisations)
- Succeeded by: Wan Romani Wan Salim (Information, Communication and Multimedia); Portfolio abolished (Non-Governmental Organisations)
- Constituency: Kuah

Member of the Kedah State Legislative Assembly for Kuah
- In office 9 May 2018 – 12 August 2023
- Preceded by: Nor Saidi Nayan (BN–UMNO)
- Succeeded by: Amar Pared Mahamud (PN–BERSATU)
- Majority: 2,452 (2018)

Faction represented in Kedah State Legislative Assembly
- 2018–2020: Pakatan Harapan
- 2020: Malaysian United Indigenous Party
- 2020–2023: Perikatan Nasional

Personal details
- Born: Mohd Firdaus bin Ahmad; 17 June 1986 (age 40) Kedah, Malaysia
- Citizenship: Malaysian
- Party: Malaysian United Indigenous Party (BERSATU)
- Other political affiliations: Pakatan Harapan (PH) (–2020); Perikatan Nasional (PN) (since 2020)
- Occupation: Politician

Mohd Firdaus bin Ahmad is a Malaysian politician who served as Member of the Kedah State Executive Council (EXCO) in the Pakatan Harapan (PH) state administration under former Menteri Besar Mukhriz Mahathir from May 2018 to the collapse of the PH state administration in May 2020 and in the Perikatan Nasional (PN) state administration under Menteri Besar Muhammad Sanusi Md Nor from May 2020 to August 2023 as well as Member of the Kedah State Legislative Assembly (MLA) for Kuah from May 2018 to August 2023. He is a member of the Malaysian United Indigenous Party (BERSATU), a component party of the Perikatan Nasional (PN) and formerly Pakatan Harapan (PH) coalitions.

== Election results ==
Kedah State Legislative Assembly
Year	Constituency	Candidate	Votes	Pct	Opponent(s)	Votes	Pct	Ballots cast	Majority	Turnout
2018	N02 Kuah	Mohd Firdaus Ahmad (BERSATU)	8,276	49.06%	Nor Saidi Nanyan (UMNO)	5,824	34.52%	17,270	2,452	80.70%
2018	N02 Kuah	Mohd Firdaus Ahmad (BERSATU)	8,276	49.06%	Mazlan Ahmad (PAS)	2,685	15.91%	17,270	2,452	80.70%
2018	N02 Kuah	Mohd Firdaus Ahmad (BERSATU)	8,276	49.06%	Mohamad Ratu Mansor (IND)	86	0.51%	17,270	2,452	80.70%

== Honours ==
- Kedah
  - Companion of the Order of Loyalty to Sultan Sallehuddin of Kedah (SSS) (2022)
