= Nawawi Ahmad =

Malaysian politician (1961–2022)

Yang Berbahagia Dato' Nawawi Ahmad DSDK AMK BKM

Member of the Kedah State Executive Council
- In office 26 November 2007 – 9 March 2008 (Works, Energy, Information, Information Technology and Environment)
- Monarch: Abdul Halim
- Menteri Besar: Mahdzir Khalid
- Preceded by: Himself (Works, Energy, Environment); Khalidah Adibah Ayob (Information); Azimi Daim (Information Technology)
- Succeeded by: Amiruddin Hamzah (Works); Phahrolrazi Zawawi (Energy); Abdul Ghani Ahmad (Information); Ismail Salleh (Information Technology); Tan Wei Shu (Environment)
- Constituency: Kuah
- In office 29 December 2005 – 26 November 2007 (Works, Energy and Environment)
- Monarch: Abdul Halim
- Menteri Besar: Mahdzir Khalid
- Preceded by: Fong Chok Gin (Works, Energy); Ahmad Bashah Md Hanipah (Environment)
- Succeeded by: Himself
- Constituency: Kuah
- In office 28 March 2004 – 29 December 2005 (Culture, Arts and Tourism)
- Monarch: Abdul Halim
- Menteri Besar: Syed Razak Syed Zain Barakbah
- Preceded by: Osman Md Aji
- Succeeded by: Fong Chok Gin
- Constituency: Kuah

Member of the Malaysian Parliament for Langkawi
- In office 5 May 2013 – 9 May 2018
- Preceded by: Abu Bakar Taib (BN–UMNO)
- Succeeded by: Mahathir Mohamad (PH–BERSATU)
- Majority: 11,861 (2013)

Member of the Kedah State Legislative Assembly for Kuah
- In office 21 March 2004 – 5 May 2013
- Preceded by: Sanusi Junid (BN–UMNO)
- Succeeded by: Nor Saidi Nanyan (BN–UMNO)
- Majority: 6,175 (2004); 3,324 (2008)

Personal details
- Born: Nawawi bin Ahmad; 3 May 1961 Langkawi, Kedah, Federation of Malaya
- Died: 28 November 2022 (aged 61) Frankfurt, Hesse, Germany
- Citizenship: Malaysian
- Party: United Malays National Organisation (UMNO)
- Other political affiliations: Barisan Nasional (BN); Perikatan Nasional (PN); Muafakat Nasional (MN)
- Occupation: Politician
- Profession: Engineer

Nawawi bin Haji Ahmad (3 May 1961 – 28 November 2022) was a Malaysian politician and engineer who served as the Member of Parliament (MP) for Langkawi from May 2013 to May 2018, Member of the Kedah State Executive Council (EXCO) in the Barisan Nasional (BN) state administration under former Menteris Besar Syed Razak Syed Zain Barakbah and Mahdzir Khalid from March 2004 to March 2008 as well as Member of the Kedah State Legislative Assembly (MLA) for Kuah from March 2004 to May 2013. A member of the United Malays National Organisation (UMNO), he was the Division Chief of UMNO of Langkawi.

In 2016, police are investigating Nawawi Ahmad’s claim that the ‘Malaysian Official 1', which the Department of Justice (DOJ) said received US$731 million from 1Malaysia Development Berhad (1MDB), is the Agong.

== Controversy ==
In 2014, Nawawi apologised to the family of Karpal Singh, a leading opposition politician who had died in a car accident, for posting photos of Karpal's corpse on Facebook.

== Death ==
Nawawi died in Frankfurt, Germany at about 3 am on 28 November 2022 on a working visit in his capacity as the Tenaga Nasional Berhad (TNB) board member. He was accompanied by his wife and buried in Frankfurt, Germany as well.

== Election results ==
Kedah State Legislative Assembly
Year	Constituency	Candidate	Votes	Pct	Opponent(s)	Votes	Pct	Ballots cast	Majority	Turnout
2004	N02 Kuah	Nawawi Ahmad (UMNO)	8,065	79.18%	Mazlan Ahmad (PAS)	1,890	18.56%	10,186	6,175	79.78%
2008	N02 Kuah	Nawawi Ahmad (UMNO)	6,660	64.52%	Hasrul Muhaimin Hasbi (PKR)	3,336	32.32%	10,322	3,324	76.49%

Parliament of Malaysia
Year	Constituency	Candidate	Votes	Pct	Opponent(s)	Votes	Pct	Ballots cast	Majority	Turnout
2013	P004 Langkawi	Nawawi Ahmad (UMNO)	21,407	68.76%	Ahmad Abdullah (PKR)	9,546	30.66%	32,096	11,861	85.51%
2013	P004 Langkawi	Nawawi Ahmad (UMNO)	21,407	68.76%	Marina Hussein (IND)	180	0.58%	32,096	11,861	85.51%
2018	P004 Langkawi	Nawawi Ahmad (UMNO)	10,061	29.14%	Mahathir Mohamad (BERSATU)	18,954	54.90%	34,527	8,893	80.87%
2018	P004 Langkawi	Nawawi Ahmad (UMNO)	10,061	29.14%	Zubir Ahmad (PAS)	5,512	15.96%	34,527	8,893	80.87%

== Honours ==
- Kedah
  - Knight Companion of the Order of Loyalty to the Royal House of Kedah (DSDK) – Dato' (2006)
  - Member of the Order of the Crown of Kedah (AMK) (2004)
  - Recipient of the Public Service Star (BKM)

== See also ==
- Kuah (state constituency)
- Langkawi (federal constituency)
