= Norzihan Ahmad-Latt =

Malaysian businessperson

Datin Norzihan Ahmad-Latt
- Born: Norzihan Ahmad; May 4, 1968 (age 58); Segamat, Johor
- Education: University of Swansea United Kingdom, Tunku Kurshiah College Seremban
- Occupations: Founder & Deputy Chairman Ruang Cikgu Berhad, iNectar Tech, Sheikha Hub.
- Spouse: Dato' Latt Shariman Abdullah (1994-Present)
- Children: 2

Datin Norzihan Ahmad (born May 4, 1968) is a Malaysian entrepreneur and startup founder. Norzihan is also one of the founding board members of Women Cooperative Malaysia Berhad, the first Women Coop in Malaysia to be given credit license for Malaysian women.

== Early life and education ==
Norzihan was born in Segamat, Johor, attended and grew up in a boarding school Tunku Kurshiah College, Seremban. She has a degree in BSC (Hons) Economics and Politics from the University of Swansea, United Kingdom She also has a Diploma in Child Psychology from Linguistic Council, Singapore.

== Career ==
After graduating, she worked as a bond trader at then Bank Bumiputra Malaysia Berhad (BBMB). Her career at BBMB took her places around the financial world. She attended ISMA Conference in New Orleans, working visit to Lehman Brothers New York, Daiwa Securities, Tokyo and Sumitomo Finance, Hong Kong.

She left BBMB and later joined CIMB trading room and K & N Kenanga as equity dealer. In 2014, she started a fashion platform ‘social business’ Sheikha Hub which earned recognition as successfully connecting buyers and sellers from Salaam Gateway as researched by Dinar Standard. She was also a consultant (fashion entrepreneur and management) for projects such as Heya Fashion Arabian Expo (Qatar), Malaysian agencies Mara (fashionpreneur program), Kelantan SEDC and Fashion brand Q Label Qatar.

In 2017, she was invited by Dubai Economic Development Cooperation to brainstorm on Modest Fashion in Torino Italy, with 30 other modest fashion experts from 17 countries. She was then recognized as a pioneer of modest fashion by Thomson Reuters.

In 2018, she started an edutech company Ruang Cikgu Berhad and another company iNectar Tech to cater for demands in digital content development.

In 2022, Norzihan was made a board member of Women Cooperative Malaysia Berhad.

== Personal life ==
In 1994, Norzihan married lawyer Dato’ Latt Shariman Abdullah, JP. They have a son, Latt Omar.
