= Mohd Asmirul Anuar Aris =

Malaysian politician

- محمد أسميرول أنوار بن أريس

Member of the Kedah State Executive Council
- In office 1 August 2018 – 17 May 2020
- Monarch: Sallehuddin
- Menteri Besar: Mukhriz Mahathir
- Portfolio: Youth and Sports, Tourism, Arts, Culture, and Entrepreneur Development
- Preceded by: Himself (Youth and Sports, Arts, Culture, and Entrepreneur Development); Tan Kok Yew (Tourism)
- Succeeded by: Mohd Firdaus Ahmad
- Constituency: Kubang Rotan
- In office 22 May 2018 – 1 August 2018
- Monarch: Sallehuddin
- Menteri Besar: Mukhriz Mahathir
- Portfolio: Youth and Sports, Arts, Culture, Heritage, Entrepreneur Development and Non-governmental Organisations
- Preceded by: Aminuddin Omar (Youth and Sports, Arts and Culture); Mohd Rawi Abd Hamid (Heritage); Suraya Yaacob (Entrepreneur Development); Tajul Urus Mat Zain (Non-governmental Organisations)
- Succeeded by: Mohd Firdaus Ahmad (Non-Governmental Organisations)
- Constituency: Kubang Rotan

Member of the Kedah State Legislative Assembly for Kubang Rotan
- In office 9 May 2018 – 12 August 2023
- Preceded by: Mohd Nasir Mustafa (PR–PAS)
- Succeeded by: Mohd Salleh Saidin (PN–BERSATU)
- Majority: 6,535 (2018)

Personal details
- Born: Mohd Asmirul Anuar bin Aris; 3 March 1977 (age 49) Alor Setar, Kedah, Malaysia
- Citizenship: Malaysian
- Party: National Trust Party (AMANAH)
- Other party: Pakatan Harapan (PH)
- Occupation: Politician

Mohd Asmirul Anuar bin Aris (born 3 March 1977) is a Malaysian politician who served as Member of the Kedah State Executive Council (EXCO) in the Pakatan Harapan (PH) state administration under former Menteri Besar Mukhriz Mahathir from May 2018 to the collapse of the PH state administration in May 2020 and Member of the Kedah State Legislative Assembly (MLA) for Kubang Rotan from May 2018 to August 2023. He is a member of the National Trust Party (AMANAH), a component party of the PH coalition.

== Election results ==
Kedah State Legislative Assembly
Year	Constituency	Candidate	Votes	Pct	Opponent(s)	Votes	Pct	Ballots cast	Majority	Turnout
2018	N16 Kubang Rotan	Mohd Asmirul Anuar Aris (AMANAH)	14,004	48.66%	Abdul Muthalib Harun (UMNO)	7,469	25.96%	29,326	6,535	80.90%
2018	N16 Kubang Rotan	Mohd Asmirul Anuar Aris (AMANAH)	14,004	48.66%	Omar Saad (PAS)	7,303	25.38%	29,326	6,535	80.90%
2023	N16 Kubang Rotan	Mohd Asmirul Anuar Aris (AMANAH)	12,165	34.64%	Mohd Salleh Saidin (BERSATU)	22,951	65.36%	35,252	10,786	70.18%
