= Amar Pared Mahamud =

Malaysian politician

Yang Berhormat Tuan Amar Pared Mahamud MLA

Member of the Kedah State Legislative Assembly for Kuah
- Incumbent
- Assumed office 12 August 2023
- Preceded by: Mohd Firdaus Ahmad (PH–BERSATU)
- Majority: 7,970 (2023)

Personal details
- Party: Malaysian United Indigenous Party (BERSATU)
- Other political affiliations: Perikatan Nasional (PN)
- Occupation: Politician

Amar Pared bin Mahamud is a Malaysian politician who has served as Member of the Kedah State Legislative Assembly (MLA) for Kuah since August 2023. He is a member of Malaysian United Indigenous Party (BERSATU), a component party of Perikatan Nasional (PN) coalition.

== Election results ==
Kedah State Legislative Assembly
Year	Constituency	Candidate	Votes	Pct	Opponent(s)	Votes	Pct	Ballots cast	Majority	Turnout
2023	N02 Kuah	Amar Pared Mahamud (BERSATU)	13,364	64.34%	Ahmad Fauzi Chik (PKR)	5,394	25.97%	20,988	7,970	60.49%
2023	N02 Kuah	Amar Pared Mahamud (BERSATU)	13,364	64.34%	Mazlan Ahmad (IND)	2,013	9.69%	20,988	7,970	60.49%
