= Abdullah Jusoh =

Malaysian politician

Haji Abdullah Jusoh AMK JP

Member of the Kedah State Executive Council
- In office 2009 – 2010 (Science and Innovation, Information, Communication Technology, Entrepreneur Development)
- Monarch: Abdul Halim
- Menteri Besar: Azizan Abdul Razak
- Constituency: Pantai Merdeka
- In office 12 March 2008 – 2009 (Education, Cooperatives, Information and Communication Technology)
- Monarch: Abdul Halim
- Menteri Besar: Azizan Abdul Razak
- Constituency: Pantai Merdeka

Member of the Kedah State Legislative Assembly for Pantai Merdeka
- In office 8 March 2008 – 5 May 2013
- Preceded by: Shahabudin Jaafar (BN–UMNO)
- Succeeded by: Ali Yahaya (BN–UMNO)
- Majority: 503 (2008)

Personal details
- Party: Malaysian Islamic Party (PAS)
- Other political affiliations: Pakatan Rakyat (PR) (2008–2015; Gagasan Sejahtera (GS) (2018–2020); Perikatan Nasional (PN) (2020–present)

Abdullah bin Jusoh is a Malaysian politician. He has served as Member of the Kedah State Executive Council (EXCO) in Pakatan Rakyat (PR) administration under Menteri Besar Azizan Abdul Razak from 2008 to 2010 as well as Member of the Kedah State Legislative Assembly for Pantai Merdeka from March 2008 to May 2013. He is a member of Malaysian Islamic Party (PAS), a component party of Perikatan Nasional (PN), formerly Pakatan Rakyat (PR) and Gagasan Sejahtera (GS) coalitions.

== Political career ==
Abdullah Jusoh first elected as Pantai Merdeka assemblyman in 2008 state election, he later appointed as Member of the Kedah State Executive Council and held the portfolio of Education, Cooperative, Information and Communication Technology until 2009. In 2009, he held the portfolio of Science and Innovation, Information, Communication Technology, Entrepreneur Development. He was removed from his post in 2010 and was replaced by Abdul Ghani Ahmad.

== Election results ==
Kedah State Legislative Assembly
Year	Constituency	Candidate	Votes	Pct	Opponent(s)	Votes	Pct	Ballots cast	Majority	Turnout
2008	N27 Pantai Merdeka	Abdullah Jusoh (PAS)	11,654	51.10%	Shuib Saedin (UMNO)	11,151	48.90%	23,139	503	83.28%
2013	N27 Pantai Merdeka	Abdullah Jusoh (PAS)	13,686	46.46%	Ali Yahaya (UMNO)	15,393	52.37%	29,763	1,707	89.40%
2013	N27 Pantai Merdeka	Abdullah Jusoh (PAS)	13,686	46.46%	Mohd Yusof Lazim (IND)	316	1.17%	29,763	1,707	89.40%

== Honours ==
- Kedah
  - Member of the Order of the Crown of Kedah (AMK) (2010)
  - Justice of the Peace (JP) (2011)
