= Jerlun-Langkawi =

Malaysia constituency

Kedah constituency

Defunct federal constituency
- Legislature: Dewan Rakyat
- Constituency created: 1974
- Constituency abolished: 1995
- First contested: 1974
- Last contested: 1990

Jerlun-Langkawi was a federal constituency in Kedah, Malaysia, that was represented in the Dewan Rakyat from 1974 to 1995.

The federal constituency was created in the 1974 redistribution and was mandated to return a single member to the Dewan Rakyat under the first past the post voting system.

== History ==
It was abolished in 1995 when it was redistributed.

=== Representation history ===
Members of Parliament for Jerlun-Langkawi
| Parliament | No | Years | Member | Party | Vote Share |
Constituency created from Kuala Kedah and Kubang Pasu Barat
| 4th | P003 | 1974–1978 | Syed Nahar Syed Sheh Shahabuddin (سيد نهار سيد سهيه شاهبوددين) | BN (UMNO) | Uncontested |
| 5th | P003 | 1978–1982 | Sanusi Junid (سنسي جنيد) | BN (UMNO) | 13,099; 52.50% |
| 6th | P003 | 1982–1986 | Sanusi Junid (سنسي جنيد) | BN (UMNO) | 18,593; 62.62% |
| 7th | P003 | 1986–1990 | Sanusi Junid (سنسي جنيد) | BN (UMNO) | 18,813; 60.06% |
| 8th | P003 | 1990–1995 | Sanusi Junid (سنسي جنيد) | BN (UMNO) | 21,690; 61.77% |
Constituency abolished, split into Langkawi and Jerlun

=== State constituency ===
| Parliamentary constituency | State constituency | | | | | | |
| Parliamentary constituency | 1955–1959* | 1959–1974 | 1974–1986 | 1986–1995 | 1995–2004 | 2004–2018 | 2018–present |
|---|---|---|---|---|---|---|---|
| Jerlun-Langkawi | | | Jerlun | | | | |
| Jerlun-Langkawi | | | Langkawi | | | | |

=== Historical boundaries ===
| State Constituency | Area | |
| State Constituency | 1974 | 1984 |
|---|---|---|
| Jerlun | Ayer Hitam; Jerlun; Kerpan; Sanglang; Sungai Korok | |
| Langkawi | Ayer Hangat; Kedawang; Kuala Teriang; Kuah; Padang Matsirat | |

== Election results ==
Malaysian general election, 1990: Jerlun-Langkawi
| Party | Candidate | Votes | % | ∆% |
|---|---|---|---|---|
| BN | Sanusi Junid | 21,690 | 61.77 | ▲1.71 |
| S46 | Syed Mustaffa Aljafree | 13,425 | 38.23 | ▲38.23 |
| Total valid votes | | 35,115 | 100.00 | |
| Total rejected ballots | | 1,281 | | |
| Unreturned ballots | | 0 | | |
| Turnout | | 36,396 | 78.29 | ▲3.12 |
| Registered electors | | 21,690 | | |
| Majority | | 8,265 | 23.54 | ▲3.42 |
| BN hold | | Swing | | |

Malaysian general election, 1986: Jerlun-Langkawi
| Party | Candidate | Votes | % | ∆% |
|---|---|---|---|---|
| BN | Sanusi Junid | 18,813 | 60.06 | ▼2.56 |
| PAS | Ahmad Din | 12,510 | 39.94 | ▲2.56 |
| Total valid votes | | 31,323 | 100.00 | |
| Total rejected ballots | | 698 | | |
| Unreturned ballots | | 0 | | |
| Turnout | | 32,021 | 75.17 | ▼2.93 |
| Registered electors | | 42,597 | | |
| Majority | | 6,303 | 20.12 | ▼5.12 |
| BN hold | | Swing | | |

Malaysian general election, 1982: Jerlun-Langkawi
| Party | Candidate | Votes | % | ∆% |
|---|---|---|---|---|
| BN | Sanusi Junid | 18,593 | 62.62 | ▲10.12 |
| PAS | Halim Arshat | 11,097 | 37.38 | ▼10.12 |
| Total valid votes | | 29,690 | 100.00 | |
| Total rejected ballots | | 735 | | |
| Unreturned ballots | | 0 | | |
| Turnout | | 30,425 | 78.10 | ▲1.39 |
| Registered electors | | 38,958 | | |
| Majority | | 7,496 | 25.24 | ▲20.24 |
| BN hold | | Swing | | |

Malaysian general election, 1978: Jerlun-Langkawi
| Party | Candidate | Votes | % | ∆% |
|---|---|---|---|---|
| BN | Sanusi Junid | 13,099 | 52.50 | ▲52.50 |
| PAS | Hassim Naim | 11,850 | 47.50 | ▲47.50 |
| Total valid votes | | 24,949 | 100.00 | |
| Total rejected ballots | | 684 | | |
| Unreturned ballots | | 0 | | |
| Turnout | | 25,633 | 76.71 | |
| Registered electors | | 33,416 | | |
| Majority | | 1,249 | 5.00 | |
| BN hold | | Swing | | |

Malaysian general election, 1974: Jerlun-Langkawi
| Party | Candidate | Votes | % | ∆% |
|---|---|---|---|---|
On the nomination day, Syed Nahar Syed Sheh Shahabuddin won uncontested.
| BN | Syed Nahar Syed Sheh Shahabuddin | | | |
| Total valid votes | | | 100.00 | |
| Total rejected ballots | | | | |
| Unreturned ballots | | | | |
| Turnout | | | | |
| Registered electors | | 28,756 | | |
| Majority | | | | |
This was a new constituency created.
