= Osman Aroff =

Malaysian politician

Yang Berbahagia Tan Sri Osman Aroff PSM SHMS SSDK DHMS DSDK SDK JMN KMN JP
- عثمان عروف

6th Menteri Besar of Kedah
- In office 28 January 1985 – 16 June 1996
- Monarch: Abdul Halim
- Preceded by: Syed Nahar Syed Sheh Shahabuddin
- Succeeded by: Sanusi Junid
- Constituency: Jitra

Pro-Chancellor of Universiti Utara Malaysia
- In office 1 September 2016 – 2017
- Preceded by: Abdul Hamid Pawanteh
- Succeeded by: Tunku Puteri Intan Safinaz

Personal details
- Born: Osman bin Aroff; 23 November 1940 (age 85) Jitra, Kedah, Unfederated Malay States
- Citizenship: Malaysian
- Party: United Malays National Organisation (UMNO)
- Other political affiliations: Barisan Nasional (BN)
- Spouse: Azizah Abdul Hamid (m. 1968; died 2010)
- Children: 4
- Education: Kolej Sultan Abdul Hamid
- Alma mater: Washington University in St. Louis
- Occupation: Politician

Osman bin Aroff (born 23 November 1940) is a Malaysian politician. He is a member of the United Malays National Organisation (UMNO), a component party in Barisan Nasional (BN) coalition. He was the Menteri Besar of Kedah from 28 January 1985 to 16 June 1996.

== Early life and education ==
Born in Jitra, Kedah on 23 November 1940, he received his early education at Sekolah Melayu Jitra until the fourth grade. Next in 1951, he continued his secondary education at Sultan Abdul Hamid College, Alor Setar, Kedah. He graduated from Cambridge Senior in 1958. From 1959 to 1963, he continued his studies in political science at Washington University in St. Louis.

== Personal life ==
He is married to Puan Sri Azizah Abdul Hamid and has 4 children.

== Election results ==
Kedah State Legislative Assembly
Year	Constituency	Candidate	Votes	Pct	Opponent(s)	Votes	Pct	Ballots cast	Majority	Turnout
1969	N01 Jitra	Osman Aroff (UMNO)	7,637	59.49%	Ayob Jasin (PMIP)	5,193	40.51%	13,719	2,434	77.60%
1974	N04 Jitra	Osman Aroff (UMNO)	Unopposed							
1978	N04 Jitra	Osman Aroff (UMNO)	8,508	63.61%	Ahmad Yusof (PAS)	4,868	36.39%	14,038	3,640	76.75%
1982	N04 Jitra	Osman Aroff (UMNO)	11,851	73.55%	Mohamad @ Mohd Salleh Yaacob (PAS)	4,262	26.45%	16,480	7,589	76.42%
1986	N04 Jitra	Osman Aroff (UMNO)	12,876	73.78%	Mohd. Kamal Haji Ismail (PAS)	4,577	26.22%	17,986	8,299	72.84%
1990	N04 Jitra	Osman Aroff (UMNO)	15,083	79.11%	Abd Rashid Mohd Salleh (S46)	3,982	20.89%	19,862	11,101	77.46%
1995	N06 Jitra	Osman Aroff (UMNO)	9,483	57.77%	Abu Kassim Abdullah (PAS)	6,933	42.23%	16,727	2,550	76.65%

== Honours ==
=== Honours of Malaysia ===
- Malaysia
  - Officer of the Order of the Defender of the Realm (KMN) (1976)
  - Companion of the Order of the Defender of the Realm (JMN) (1984)
  - Commander of the Order of Loyalty to the Crown of Malaysia (PSM) – Tan Sri (1991)
- Kedah
  - Companion of the Order of Loyalty to the Royal House of Kedah (SDK) (1974)
  - Knight Companion of the Order of Loyalty to the Royal House of Kedah (DSDK) – Dato' (1980)
  - Knight Commander of the Order of Loyalty to Sultan Abdul Halim Mu'adzam Shah (DHMS) – Dato' Paduka (1983)
  - Justice of the Peace of Kedah (JP) (1986)
  - Knight Grand Companion of the Order of Loyalty to the Royal House of Kedah (SSDK) – Dato' Seri (1987)
  - Grand Commander of the Order of Loyalty to Sultan Abdul Halim Mu'adzam Shah (SHMS) – Dato' Seri Diraja (2010)
