= Sanusi Junid =

Malaysian politician

Yang Berbahagia Tan Sri Dato' Seri Sanusi Junid PSM SSDK SSSA SIMP DGSM DSDK
- سنسي جنيد

7th Menteri Besar of Kedah
- In office 16 June 1996 – 11 December 1999
- Monarch: Abdul Halim
- Preceded by: Osman Aroff
- Succeeded by: Syed Razak Syed Zain Barakbah
- Constituency: Kuah

Minister of Agriculture
- In office 11 August 1986 – 7 May 1995
- Monarchs: Iskandar; Azlan Shah
- Prime Minister: Mahathir Mohamad
- Deputy: Alexander Lee Yu Lung (1986–1989); Luhat Wan (1986–1987); Mohd. Kassim Ahmed (1987–1990); Subramaniam Sinniah (1989–1990); T. Marimuthu (1990–1995)
- Preceded by: Anwar Ibrahim
- Succeeded by: Sulaiman Daud
- Constituency: Jerlun-Langkawi

Minister of National and Rural Development
- In office 17 July 1981 – 10 August 1986
- Monarchs: Ahmad Shah; Iskandar
- Prime Minister: Mahathir Mohamad
- Deputy: Abdillah Abdul Hamid (1984–1986)
- Preceded by: Shariff Ahmad as Minister of Lands and Regional Development
- Succeeded by: Abdul Ghafar Baba
- Constituency: Jerlun-Langkawi

Disciplinary Board Chairman of Malaysian United Indigenous Party
- In office 2017 – 9 March 2018
- Preceded by: Position Established
- Succeeded by: Megat Najmuddin Megat Khas

4th President of International Islamic University Malaysia
- In office February 2000 – 2 June 2008
- Preceded by: Najib Razak
- Succeeded by: Mohd Sidek Hassan

Member of the Kedah State Assembly for Kuah
- In office 24 April 1995 – 21 March 2004
- Preceded by: New constituency
- Succeeded by: Nawawi Ahmad (UMNO—BN)
- Majority: 4,162 (1995); 3,280 (1999)

Member of the Malaysian Parliament for Jerlun-Langkawi
- In office 22 July 1978 – 24 April 1995
- Preceded by: Syed Nahar Syed Sheh Shahabuddin (UMNO—BN)
- Succeeded by: Constituency dissolved
- Majority: 1,249 (1978); 7,496 (1982); 6,303 (1986); 8,265 (1990)

Personal details
- Born: 11 July 1942 Yan, Kedah, Japanese occupation of Malaya
- Died: 9 March 2018 (aged 75) Pantai Dalam, Kuala Lumpur
- Resting place: Bukit Kiara Muslim Cemetery
- Party: United Malays National Organisation (UMNO) (1963-2008); Malaysian United Indigenous Party (BERSATU) (2016-2018)
- Other political affiliations: Alliance Party (Alliance) (1963-1973); Barisan Nasional (BN) (1973-2008); Pakatan Harapan (PH) (2016-2018)
- Spouse: Puan Sri Nila Inangda Manyam Keumala
- Children: 8 (including Akhramsyah Muammar Ubaidah)
- Website: http://sanusijunid.blogspot.my/

Sanusi bin Junid (11 July 1942 – 9 March 2018) was a Malaysian politician. He was appointed Minister of National and Rural Development in 1981 at the age of 39 and as Minister of Agriculture in 1986. Sanusi was seventh Menteri Besar of Kedah from 1996 to 1999.

== Early life and education ==
Born in Yan, Kedah on 11 July 1942, Sanusi received his education at Ibrahim School and Malay College Kuala Kangsar (MCKK). In 1969, he went on to study at the Institute of Bankers London, the City of London College and the Institute of Export London, and later obtained a Certificate in Foreign Trade and Foreign Exchange at the University of London.

== Banking career ==
Sanusi began his career as a trainee at Standard Chartered Bank, at Seremban in 1963. In 1971, he was appointed Senior Manager of Chartered Bank Lending, Kuala Lumpur.

Tan Sri Sanusi became the Director of Bank Simpanan Nasional and Chairman of Insan Diranto Bhd. in 1975. Two years later, in 1977, he was appointed as Chairman of Tugu Insurance Sdn. Bhd. and Chairman of Obanto Management Consultancy Sdn. Bhd. In addition he was also the founder of the Shamelin Corporation.

In 1978, Tan Sri Sanusi was appointed as a Member of the MARA University of Technology and subsequently in 1982, he became the Advisor of the College and Council of the University of Malaya. He was also appointed as Chairman of the National Day Committee and Member of the Malaysian Chamber of Commerce in 1983, and in February 2000, he became President of the International Islamic University of Malaysia (IIUM).

Tan Sri Sanusi has also served as Vice President of ABIM and President of the Association of Youth Clubs of Malaysia (MAYC).

== Political career ==
Sanusi was involved in politics as a Seremban UMNO member when he started working in 1963. His rise in politics is fast and smooth.

A year after joining UMNO, Sanusi was appointed as UMNO Youth Secretary of the Seremban Branch and later in 1966, he was appointed as UMNO Treasurer of the Eastern Seremban Division. Sanusi became the Head of UMNO Division of the Eastern Seremban Division and the UMNO Secretary of the Eastern Seremban Division in 1967.

In 1974 at the age of 32, Sanusi took part in the election and was elected as MP of Jerai. He was appointed as Deputy Head of the Umno Division of the Wilderness Division in 1975 and the Head of Information of the UMNO Kedah in 1978.

The leadership talent he displayed made him trustworthy and was appointed to a number of key positions in the cabinet. From 1978 to 1980, he was appointed as Deputy Minister of Land and Regional Development and subsequently Deputy Minister of Home Affairs from 1980 to 1981.

In 1981, Sanusi was appointed as Minister of National and Rural Development and held the office until 1986. In that year, he was also appointed as Chairman of the UMNO Information Committee of Malaysia, Chairman of the UMNO Information Bureau of Malaysia and Member of the Supreme Council of UMNO Malaysia.

In the 1982 election, Sanusi was elected as MP of Jerlun-Langkawi and was later elected to the UMNO Supreme Council of Malaysia. Subsequently, he was appointed as UMNO Malaysia Secretary-General in 1984.

In 1986, Tan Sri Sanusi became Minister of Agriculture and Head of Jerlun Division, Langkawi. He was elected as UMNO Malaysia Vice President in 1990. Sanusi became the seventh Menteri Besar of Kedah Darul Aman and held the office from 16 June 1996, until November 1999. He was elected Kuah District Assemblyman in 1995.

In honor of his contributions and services, he has been awarded medals and honors, among them DSSM, SSSA, DGSM, Kedah Crown Prince (SMK), Dato' Setia from the Sultan of Kedah (DSDK), the Chief Justice of the Crown (PSM) and the King's Hon. Must (SSDK).

== Personal life ==
He was married to Puan Sri Nila Inangda Manyam Keumala and had eight children. In January 2003, Sanusi Junid's daughter, Ammanda Ruhul Hamidah, married Masrul Faisal at a reception held at the Putra World Trade Centre in Kuala Lumpur, attended by Prime Minister Mahathir Mohamad and his wife, Siti Hasmah Mohamad Ali.

== Death ==
Sanusi died on 9 March 2018, at his residence in Zehn Apartment, Bukit Pantai, Kuala Lumpur.

His funeral at Saidina Umar Al-Khattab Mosque in Bukit Damansara was attended by two former Malaysian prime ministers, Mahathir Mohamad and Abdullah Ahmad Badawi, and by Deputy Minister of Defense, Mohd Johari Baharum, Government Sociology Advisor Tan Sri Dr. Rais Yatim, BERSATU President Tan Sri Muhyiddin Yassin and Minister of Agriculture and Agro-based Industry, Ahmad Shabery Cheek. He was buried at Bukit Kiara Muslim Cemetery.

== Election results ==
Parliament of Malaysia
Year	Constituency	Candidate	Votes	Pct	Opponent(s)	Votes	Pct	Ballots cast	Majority	Turnout
1974	P011 Jerai	Sanusi Junid (UMNO)	None	None	Unopposed					
1978	P003 Jerlun-Langkawi	Sanusi Junid (UMNO)	13,099	52.50%	Hassim Naim (PAS)	11,850	47.50%	Unknown	1,249	Unknown
1982	P003 Jerlun-Langkawi	Sanusi Junid (UMNO)	18,593	62.62%	Halim Arshat (PAS)	11,097	37.38%	30,425	7,496	78.10%
1986	P003 Jerlun-Langkawi	Sanusi Junid (UMNO)	18,813	60.06%	Ahmad Din (PAS)	12,510	39.94%	32,021	6,303	75.17%
1990	P003 Jerlun-Langkawi	Sanusi Junid (UMNO)	21,690	61.77%	Syed Mustaffa Aljafree (S46)	13,425	38.23%	36,396	8,265	78.29%

Kedah State Legislative Assembly
Year	Constituency	Candidate	Votes	Pct	Opponent(s)	Votes	Pct	Ballots cast	Majority	Turnout
1995	N02 Kuah	Sanusi Junid (UMNO)	5,436	81.01%	Yusof Abdullah (S46)	1,274	18.99%	7,204	4,162	74.34%
1999	N02 Kuah	Sanusi Junid (UMNO)	5,630	70.55%	Haji Che Din Arshad (PAS)	2,350	29.44%	8,231	3,280	78.18%

== Honours ==
=== Honours of Malaysia ===
- Malaysia
  - Commander of the Order of Loyalty to the Crown of Malaysia (PSM) – Tan Sri (1997)
- Kedah
  - Knight Grand Companion of the Order of Loyalty to the Royal House of Kedah (SSDK) – Dato' Seri (1997)
  - Knight Companion of the Order of Loyalty to the Royal House of Kedah (DSDK) – Dato' (1982)
- Malacca
  - Grand Commander of the Exalted Order of Malacca (DGSM) – Datuk Seri (1984)
- Pahang
  - Grand Knight of the Order of the Crown of Pahang (SIMP) – formerly Dato', now Dato' Indera (2001)
- Selangor
  - Knight Grand Companion of the Order of Sultan Salahuddin Abdul Aziz Shah (SSSA) – Dato' Seri (1990)
