= Kubang Rotan =

Kubang Rotan (N16)
Kedah constituency

State constituency
- Legislature: Kedah State Legislative Assembly
MLA
Mohd Salleh Saidin
PN
- Constituency created: 1994
- First contested: 1995
- Last contested: 2023

Demographics
- Population (2020): 63,237
- Electors (2023): 50,233

Kubang Rotan is a state constituency in Kedah, Malaysia, that has been represented in the Kedah State Legislative Assembly.

== Demographics ==
As of 2020, Kubang Rotan has a population of 63,237 people.

Ethnic breakdown of Kubang Rotan's electorate as of 2023
1. Malay (70.5%)
2. Chinese (27.8%)
3. Indian (0.97%)
4. Other ethnicities (0.73%)

== History ==
=== Polling districts ===
According to the gazette issued on 30 March 2018, the Kubang Rotan constituency has a total of 17 polling districts.

State constituency	Polling districts	Code	Location
Kubang Rotan (N16）	Kuar Jawa	010/17/01	SK Hj Abdullag Sadun
Kubang Rotan (N16）	Kubang Jawi	010/17/02	SK Alor Janggus
Kubang Rotan (N16）	Kubang Jambu	010/16/03	SJK (C) Long Seong
Kubang Rotan (N16）	Kubang Rotan	010/16/04	SMK Kubang Rotan
Kubang Rotan (N16）	Seberang Kota	010/16/05	SK Kuala Kedah
Kubang Rotan (N16）	Kampung Bahru	010/16/06	SJK (C) Pei Shih
Kubang Rotan (N16）	Pekan Kuala Kedah	010/16/07	SMK Seri Pantai
Kubang Rotan (N16）	Taman Sri Putra	010/16/08	SK Seri Pantai
Kubang Rotan (N16）	Kampung Tengah	010/16/09	SK Haji Ismail
Kubang Rotan (N16）	Kampung Balai	010/16/10	SK Haji Salleh Masri
Kubang Rotan (N16）	Kubang Panggas	010/16/11	SK Dato' Shaari
Kubang Rotan (N16）	Telok Chengai	010/16/12	SMK Tengku Laksamana
Kubang Rotan (N16）	Taman Seri Ampang	010/16/13	SMJK Keat Hwa II
Kubang Rotan (N16）	Taman Pelangi	010/16/14	SJK (C) Pei Hwa
Kubang Rotan (N16）	Peremba	010/16/15	SK Peremba
Kubang Rotan (N16）	Taman Sultan Badlishah	010/16/16	SMK Seberang Perak
Kubang Rotan (N16）	Taman Malek	010/16/17	SMJK Keat Hwa I

=== Representation history ===
Kedah State Legislative Assemblyman for Kubang Rotan
Assembly	No	Years	Member	Party
Constituency created from Alor Janggus and Pengkalan Kundor
9th	N16	1995–1999	Syed Razak Syed Zain	BN (UMNO)
10th	N16	1999–2004	Syed Razak Syed Zain	BN (UMNO)
11th	N16	2004–2008	Syed Razak Syed Zain	BN (UMNO)
12th	N16	2008–2013	Mohd Nasir Mustafa	PR (PAS)
13th	N16	2013–2018	Mohd Nasir Mustafa	PR (PAS)
14th	N16	2018–2023	Mohd Asmirul Anuar Aris	PH (AMANAH)
15th	N16	2023–present	Mohd Salleh Saidin	PN (BERSATU)

== Election results ==
Kedah state election, 2023: Kubang Rotan
Party	Candidate	Votes	%	∆%
PN	Mohd Salleh Saidin	22,951	65.36	▲65.36
PH	Mohd Asmirul Anuar Aris	12,165	34.64	▼14.03
Total valid votes		35,116	100.00	
Total rejected ballots		136		
Unreturned ballots		42		
Turnout		35,294	70.26	▼10.64
Registered electors		50,233		
Majority		10,786	30.72	▲8.01
PN gain from PKR		Swing		?

Kedah state election, 2018: Kubang Rotan
Party	Candidate	Votes	%	∆%
PKR	Mohd Asmirul Anuar Aris	14,004	48.67	▲48.67
BN	Abdul Muthalib Harun	7,469	25.96	▼22.24
PAS	Omar Saad	7,303	25.38	▼26.42
Total valid votes		28,776	100.00	
Total rejected ballots		449		
Unreturned ballots		0		
Turnout		29,326	80.90	▼3.93
Registered electors		36,253		
Majority		6,535	22.71	▲19.11
PKR gain from PAS		Swing		?

Kedah state election, 2013: Kubang Rotan
Party	Candidate	Votes	%	∆%
PAS	Mohd Nasir Mustafa	15,013	51.80	▼1.39
BN	Latt Shariman Abdullah	13,969	48.20	▲1.39
Total valid votes		28,982	100.00	
Total rejected ballots		335		
Unreturned ballots		0		
Turnout		29,317	84.83	▲8.31
Registered electors		34,559		
Majority		1,044	3.60	▼2.78
PAS hold		Swing		

Kedah state election, 2008: Kubang Rotan
Party	Candidate	Votes	%	∆%
PAS	Mohd Nasir Mustafa	11,550	53.19	▲53.19
BN	Nordin Salleh	10,163	46.81	▼22.10
Total valid votes		21,713	100.00	
Total rejected ballots		335		
Unreturned ballots		2		
Turnout		22,050	76.52	▼1.84
Registered electors		28,817		
Majority		1,387	6.38	▼31.44
PAS gain from BN		Swing		?

Kedah state election, 2004: Kubang Rotan
Party	Candidate	Votes	%	∆%
BN	Syed Razak Syed Zain	14,468	68.91	▲11.73
PKR	Saifuddin Nasution Ismail	6,527	31.09	▲31.09
Total valid votes		20,995	100.00	
Total rejected ballots		389		
Unreturned ballots		31		
Turnout		21,415	78.36	▲3.57
Registered electors		27,329		
Majority		7,941	37.82	▲23.46
BN hold		Swing		

Kedah state election, 1999: Kubang Rotan
Party	Candidate	Votes	%	∆%
BN	Syed Razak Syed Zain	7,905	57.18	▼7.12
PAS	Kasim Mat Isa	5,920	42.82	▲7.12
Total valid votes		13,825	100.00	
Total rejected ballots		357		
Unreturned ballots		8		
Turnout		14,190	74.79	▲2.51
Registered electors		18,973		
Majority		1,985	14.36	▼14.24
BN hold		Swing		

Kedah state election, 1995: Kubang Rotan
Party	Candidate	Votes	%
BN	Syed Razak Syed Zain	8,482	64.30
PAS	Muhamad Yusof Husin	4,709	35.70
Total valid votes		13,191	100.00
Total rejected ballots		243	
Unreturned ballots		40	
Turnout		13,474	72.28
Registered electors		18,642	
Majority		3,773	28.60
This was a new constituency created.
