= Latt Shariman Abdullah =

Yang Berbahagia Dato' Latt Shariman Abdullah

Special Function Officer To Dato' Seri Najib Bin Tun Abdul Razak
- Incumbent
- Assumed office 25 June 2004

Personal details
- Born: 5 September 1968 (age 58)
- Spouse: Datin Norzihan Latt
- Children: Latt Omar Latt Shariman
- Education: Malay College Kuala Kangsar

Latt Shariman Abdullah was the Political Secretary at the Prime Minister's department during the premiership of Tun Abdullah bin Ahmad Badawi. Latt Shariman is also the UMNO Kuala Kedah Division Chief.

== Education ==
Dato' Latt Shariman is one of the alumnus from the prestigious Malay College Kuala Kangsar MCKK. Dato' Latt Shariman Abdullah received his education at the MARA University of Technology Malaysia in Public Policy, then continued his study in Law at the International Islamic University Malaysia.

== Career ==
In 2004 he joined the Malaysian government as Political Secretary at the Prime Minister's department during the premiership of Tun Abdullah Badawi. He spent a decade in government at various senior positions at the Economic Planning Unit, Ministry of Agriculture, Ministry of Defense and Ministry of Finance. He is involved in many NGOs in Malaysia including the National Red Crescent Organisation, the Asian Football Confederation & founding President of eSports Malaysia, the governing national body for electronic sports.

== Involvement in rugby ==
Dato' Latt was active in the sport of rugby and frequently organize rugby matches especially in the state of Kedah. In Kedah, there is a rugby trophy named after him. Currently the SAHOCA or SULTAN Abdul Hamid Old Collegians Association rugby team is holding the trophy and is the defending champion.

== Fisherman insurance scheme ==
Fisherman in Kuala Kedah, lead a dangerous life. Previously, most of them went to the sea without any insurance. The risks are not only to their safety, but also to their family on land if something bad were to happen to them. Latt, with the help of the federal government, introduced fisherman insurance that will protect the fisherman and their families.

== Helping the Hatyai bomb victims ==
He was the officer in charged with coordinating with the victims of the 2012 Hatyai bombings. The government of Malaysia donated 459,000 baht Thai Baht approximately Ringgit Malaysia 45,900. to the next of kin of the victim.
