= Kuah (state constituency) =

Electoral district in Kedah, Malaysia

Kuah (N02)
Kedah constituency

State constituency
- Legislature: Kedah State Legislative Assembly
MLA
Amar Pared Mahamud
PN
- Constituency created: 1994
- First contested: 1995
- Last contested: 2023

Demographics
- Electors (2023): 34,694

Kuah is a state constituency in Kedah, Malaysia, that has been represented in the Kedah State Legislative Assembly.

== Demographics ==
As of 2020, Kuah has a population of 49,583 people.

Ethnic breakdown of Kuah's electorate as of 2023
1. Malay (84.5%)
2. Chinese (11.9%)
3. Indian (2.14%)
4. Other ethnicities (1.50%)

== History ==
=== Polling districts ===
According to the gazette issued on 30 March 2018, the Kuah constituency has a total of 14 polling districts.

State constituency	Polling districts	Code	Location
Kuah (N02)	Bendang Baru	004/02/01	SK Seri Negeri
Kuah (N02)	Kampung Gelam	004/02/02	SMK Kedawang
Kuah (N02)	Kedawang	004/02/03	SK Kedawang
Kuah (N02)	Pantai Chenang	004/02/04	Langkawi Tourism Academy @ Kolej Komuniti Langkawi, Jalan Pantai Chenang
Kuah (N02)	Temonyong	004/02/05	SK Temonyong
Kuah (N02)	Kampung Bayas	004/02/06	SK Bayas
Kuah (N02)	Sungai Menghulu	004/02/07	Kolej Vokasional Pulau Langkawi
Kuah (N02)	Kelibang	004/02/08	SK Kelibang
Kuah (N02)	Dundong	004/02/09	SMK Mahsuri
Kuah (N02)	Pulau Dayang Bunting	004/02/10	SK Selat Bagan Nyior
Kuah (N02)	Lubok Chempedak	004/02/11	SK Lubok Chempedak
Kuah (N02)	Kampung Tuba	004/02/12	SK Pulau Tuba
Kuah (N02)	Kuah	004/02/13	SK Langkawi
Kuah (N02)	Kampung Bukit Malut	004/02/14	SK Bayas

=== Representation history ===
Kedah State Legislative Assemblyman for Kuah
Assembly	No	Years	Member	Party
Constituency created from Langkawi
9th	N02	1995–1999	Sanusi Junid	BN (UMNO)
10th	N02	1999–2004	Sanusi Junid	BN (UMNO)
11th	N02	2004–2008	Nawawi Ahmad	BN (UMNO)
12th	N02	2008–2013	Nawawi Ahmad	BN (UMNO)
13th	N02	2013–2018	Nor Saidi Nayan	BN (UMNO)
14th	N02	2018–2020	Mohd Firdaus Ahmad	PH (BERSATU)
14th	N02	2020–2023	Mohd Firdaus Ahmad	PN (BERSATU)
15th	N02	2023–present	Amar Pared Mahamud	PN (BERSATU)

== Election results ==
Kedah state election, 2023
Party	Candidate	Votes	%	∆%
PN	Amar Pared Mahamud	13,364	64.34	▲64.34
PH	Mohamad Fauzi Chik	5,394	25.97	▼23.08
Independent	Mazlan Ahmad	2,013	9.69	▲9.69
Total valid votes		20,771	100.00	
Total rejected ballots		139		
Unreturned ballots		78		
Turnout		20,988	60.49	▼20.21
Registered electors		34,694		
Majority		7,970	38.37	▲23.84
PN gain from PKR		Swing		?

Kedah state election, 2018
Party	Candidate	Votes	%	∆%
PKR	Mohd Firdaus Ahmad	8,276	49.05	▲21.78
BN	Nor Saidi Nayan	5,824	34.52	▼37.39
PAS	Mazlan Ahmad	2,685	15.91	▲15.91
Independent	Mohamad Ratu Mansor	86	0.51	▲0.51
Total valid votes		16,871	100.00	
Total rejected ballots		353		
Unreturned ballots		0		
Turnout		16,871	80.70	▼2.97
Registered electors		21,400		
Majority		2,452	14.53	▼30.11
PKR gain from BN		Swing		?

Kedah state election, 2013
Party	Candidate	Votes	%	∆%
BN	Nor Saidi Nayan	10,263	71.91	▲5.28
PKR	Ahmad Kasim	3,892	27.27	▼6.10
Independent	Zaflee Pakwanteh	117	0.82	▲0.82
Total valid votes		14,272	100.00	
Total rejected ballots		293		
Unreturned ballots		0		
Turnout		14,563	83.67	▲7.18
Registered electors		17,406		
Majority		6,371	44.64	▲11.38
BN hold		Swing		

Kedah state election, 2008
Party	Candidate	Votes	%	∆%
BN	Nawawi Ahmad	6,660	66.63	▼14.38
PKR	Hasrul Muhaimin Hasbi	3,336	33.37	▲33.37
Total valid votes		9,996	100.00	
Total rejected ballots		288		
Unreturned ballots		38		
Turnout		10,322	76.49	▼3.29
Registered electors		13,495		
Majority		3,324	33.26	▼28.76
BN hold		Swing		

Kedah state election, 2004
Party	Candidate	Votes	%	∆%
BN	Nawawi Ahmad	8,065	81.01	▲10.46
PAS	Mazlan Ahmad	1,890	18.99	▼10.46
Total valid votes		9,955	100.00	
Total rejected ballots		197		
Unreturned ballots		34		
Turnout		10,186	79.78	▲1.60
Registered electors		12,767		
Majority		6,175	62.02	▲20.91
BN hold		Swing		

Kedah state election, 1999
Party	Candidate	Votes	%	∆%
BN	Sanusi Junid	5,630	70.55	▼10.46
PAS	Haji Che Din Arshad	2,350	29.44	▲29.44
Total valid votes		7,980	100.00	
Total rejected ballots		193		
Unreturned ballots		58		
Turnout		8,231	78.18	▲3.84
Registered electors		10,527		
Majority		3,280	41.11	▼20.91
BN hold		Swing		

Kedah state election, 1995
Party	Candidate	Votes	%
BN	Sanusi Junid	5,436	81.01
S46	Yusof Abdullah	1,274	18.99
Total valid votes		6,710	100.00
Total rejected ballots		454	
Unreturned ballots		40	
Turnout		7,204	74.34
Registered electors		9,690	
Majority		4,162	62.02
This was a new constituency created.
