= Bakar Bata (state constituency) =

Kedah constituency

Defunct state constituency
- Legislature: Kedah State Legislative Assembly
- Constituency created: 2003
- Constituency abolished: 2018
- First contested: 2004
- Last contested: 2013

Bakar Bata was a state constituency in Kedah, Malaysia, that had been represented in the Kedah State Legislative Assembly.

== History ==
It was abolished in 2018 when it was redistributed.

=== Representation history ===
Members of the Legislative Assembly for Bakar Bata
Assembly	No	Years	Member	Party
Constituency created from Alor Merah
11th	N12	2004–2008	Ahmad Bashah Md Hanipah	BN (UMNO)
12th	N12	2008–2013	Ahmad Bashah Md Hanipah	BN (UMNO)
13th	N12	2013–2018	Ahmad Bashah Md Hanipah	BN (UMNO)
Constituency renamed to Suka Menanti

== Election results ==
Kedah state election, 2013
Party	Candidate	Votes	%	∆%
BN	Ahmad Bashah Md Hanipah	11,999	51.51	▲0.40
PKR	Mohd Eekmal Ahmad	11,104	47.67	▼1.22
MUPP	Jawahar Raja Abdul Wahid	192	0.82	▲0.82
Total valid votes		23,295	100.00	
Total rejected ballots		363		
Unreturned ballots		105		
Turnout		23,760	84.30	
Registered electors		28,186		
Majority		895	3.84	
BN hold		Swing		
Source(s) "undi.info N12 Bakar Bata".

Kedah state election, 2008
Party	Candidate	Votes	%	∆%
BN	Ahmad Bashah Md Hanipah	8,232	51.11	▼17.59
PKR	Rohani Bakar	7,874	48.89	▲48.89
Total valid votes		16,106	100.00	
Total rejected ballots		240		
Unreturned ballots		49		
Turnout		16,395	72.24	
Registered electors		22,695		
Majority		358	2.22	
BN hold		Swing		
Source(s) "undi.info N12 Bakar Bata".

Kedah state election, 2004
Party	Candidate	Votes	%
BN	Ahmad Bashah Md Hanipah	11,091	68.70
PAS	Ismail Salleh	5,054	31.30
Total valid votes		16,145	100.00
Total rejected ballots		191	
Unreturned ballots		33	
Turnout		16,368	75.72
Registered electors		21,617	
Majority		6,037	37.40
This was a new constituency created.
Source(s) "undi.info N12 Bakar Bata".
