= Syed Razak Syed Zain Barakbah =

Malaysian politician

Yang Berbahagia Dato' Seri Utama Syed Razak Syed Zain Barakhbah DMK DGSM SSDK DSDK KMN AMN JP
- سيد رزاق سيد زين بارکبه

8th Menteri Besar of Kedah
- In office 11 December 1999 – 22 December 2005
- Monarch: Abdul Halim
- Preceded by: Sanusi Junid
- Succeeded by: Mahdzir Khalid
- Constituency: Kubang Rotan

Member of the Kedah State Legislative Assembly for Kubang Rotan
- In office 25 April 1995 – 8 March 2008
- Preceded by: constituency created from Alor Janggus
- Succeeded by: Nasir Mustafa (PR–PAS)
- Majority: 3,773 (1995); 1,985 (1999); 7,941 (2004)

Member of the Kedah State Legislative Assembly for Pengkalan Kundor
- In office 3 August 1986 – 25 April 1995
- Preceded by: Jamaluddin Lebai Bakar
- Succeeded by: Jamil Idross
- Majority: 1,894 (1986); 1,165 (1990)

Personal details
- Born: Syed Razak bin Syed Zain Barakhbah; 22 August 1944 Kubang Rotan, Kuala Kedah, Kedah, Japanese occupation of Malaya
- Died: 8 March 2023 (aged 78) Sungai Petani, Kedah
- Resting place: Masjid Nurul Ehsan Muslim Cemetery, Kubang Rotan, Kuala Kedah
- Citizenship: Malaysian
- Party: United Malays National Organisation (UMNO)
- Other political affiliations: Barisan Nasional (BN)
- Spouse: Toh Puan Syarifah Hamidah Syad Hamid
- Occupation: Politician
- Profession: Businessman, politician

Syed Razak bin Syed Zain Barakhbah (22 August 1944 – 8 March 2023) was a Malaysian politician and entrepreneur. He was the Menteri Besar of Kedah from 11 December 1999 to 22 December 2005 representing the United Malays National Organisation.

Syed Razak died on 8 March 2023, aged 79. He was buried at the Masjid Nurul Ehsan in Kubang Rotan, Kuala Kedah.

== Election results ==
Kedah State Legislative Assembly
| Year | Constituency | Candidate | Votes | Pct | Opponent(s) | Votes | Pct | Ballots cast | Majority | Turnout |
|---|---|---|---|---|---|---|---|---|---|---|
| 1986 | N12 Pengkalan Kundor | Syed Razak Syed Zain Barakbah (UMNO) | 8,329 | 56.41% | Halim Arshat (PAS) | 6,435 | 43.59% | 15,224 | 1,894 | 71.42% |
| 1990 | N12 Pengkalan Kundor | Syed Razak Syed Zain Barakbah (UMNO) | 8,527 | 53.57% | Phahrolrazi Mohd Zawawi (PAS) | 7,362 | 46.43% | 16,254 | 1,165 | 74.63% |
| 1995 | N16 Kubang Rotan | Syed Razak Syed Zain Barakbah (UMNO) | 8,482 | 64.30% | Muhamad Yusof Husin (PAS) | 4,709 | 35.70% | 13,474 | 3,773 | 72.28% |
| 1999 | N16 Kubang Rotan | Syed Razak Syed Zain Barakbah (UMNO) | 7,905 | 57.18% | Kasim Mat Isa (PAS) | 5,920 | 42.82% | 14,190 | 1,985 | 74.79% |
| 2004 | N16 Kubang Rotan | Syed Razak Syed Zain Barakbah (UMNO) | 14,468 | 68.91% | Saifuddin Nasution Ismail (PKR) | 6,527 | 31.09% | 21,415 | 7,941 | 78.36% |

== Honours ==
- Malaysia
  - Member of the Order of the Defender of the Realm (AMN) (1979)
  - Officer of the Order of the Defender of the Realm (KMN) (1984)
- Kedah
  - Justice of the Peace (JP) (1986)
  - Knight Companion of the Order of Loyalty to the Royal House of Kedah (DSDK) – Dato' (1990)
  - Knight Grand Companion of the Order of Loyalty to the Royal House of Kedah (SSDK) – Dato' Seri (2000)
  - Dato' Seri Setia DiRaja (2003)
  - Member of the Supreme Order of Sri Mahawangsa (DMK) – Dato' Seri Utama (2005)
- Malacca
  - Grand Commander of the Exalted Order of Malacca (DGSM) – Datuk Seri (2004)
