= Ahmad Bashah Md Hanipah =

Malaysian politician

Yang Berbahagia Dato' Seri Diraja Ahmad Bashah Md Hanipah SHMS SSDK DHMS DSDK SDK AMK KMN PPN
- أحمد باشا محمد حنيفة
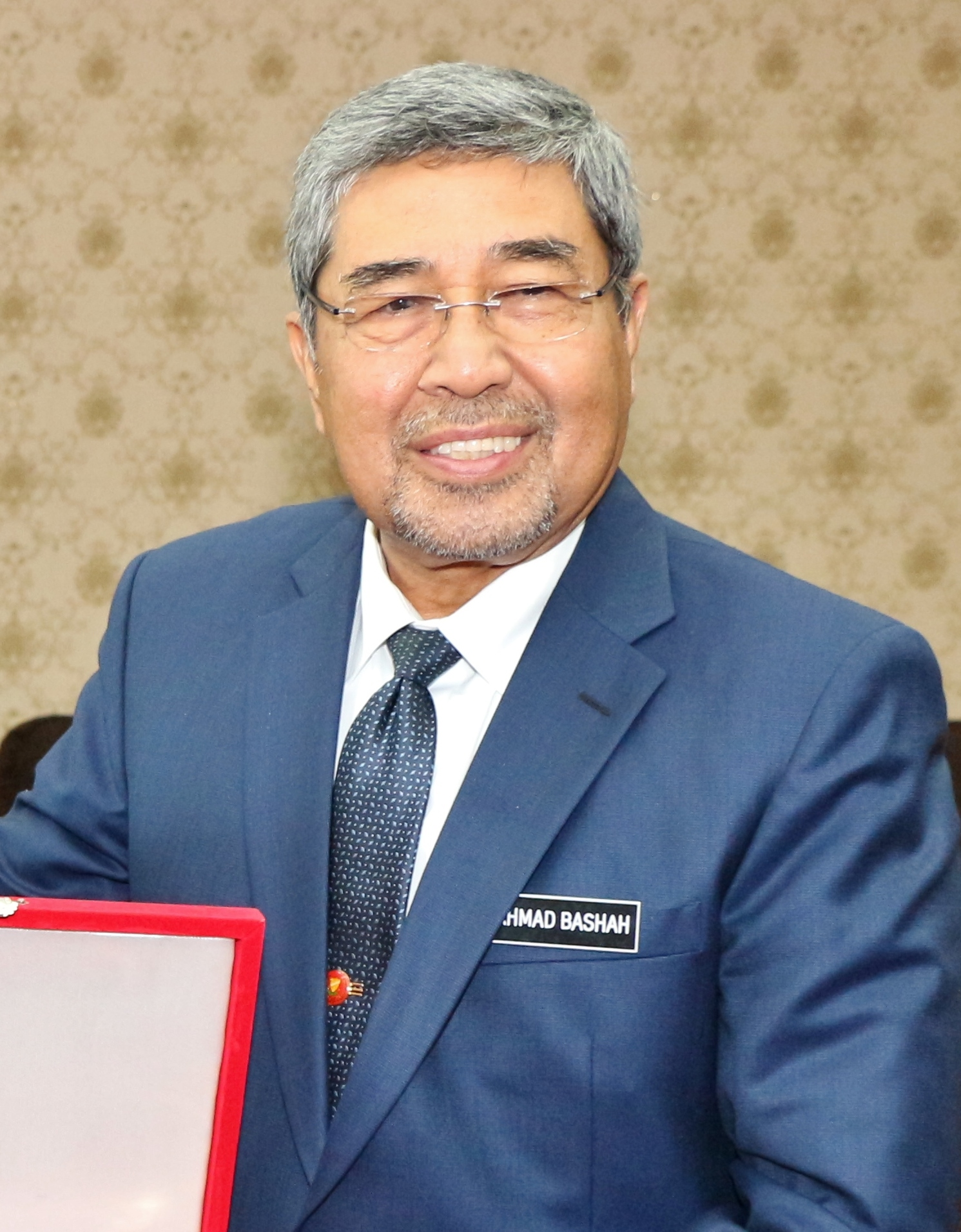

12th Menteri Besar of Kedah
- In office 4 February 2016 – 10 May 2018
- Monarchs: Abdul Halim; Sallehuddin
- Preceded by: Mukhriz Mahathir
- Succeeded by: Mukhriz Mahathir
- Constituency: Bakar Bata

Deputy Minister of Domestic Trade, Co-operatives and Consumerism
- In office 16 May 2013 – 3 February 2016
- Minister: Hasan Malek (2013– 2015); Hamzah Zainudin (2015–2016)
- Preceded by: Tan Lian Hoe; Rohani Abdul Karim
- Succeeded by: Henry Sum Agong
- Constituency: Senator

Member of the Kedah State Legislative Assembly for Bakar Bata
- In office 1 October 2004 – 12 March 2018
- Preceded by: Constituency established
- Succeeded by: Zamri Yusuf (PKR–PH)
- Majority: 6,037 (2004); 358 (2008); 895 (2013)

Member of the Kedah State Legislative Assembly for Alor Merah
- In office 10 February 1995 – 1 October 2004
- Preceded by: Azizan Taib
- Succeeded by: Constituency abolished
- Majority: 5,933 (1995); 2,922 (1999)

Personal details
- Born: Ahmad Bashah bin Md Hanipah; 10 October 1950 (age 75) Alor Setar, Kedah, Federation of Malaya (now Malaysia)
- Citizenship: Malaysian
- Party: United Malays National Organisation (UMNO)
- Other political affiliations: Barisan Nasional (BN); Perikatan Nasional (PN); Muafakat Nasional (MN)
- Spouse: Hizam Awang Ahmad
- Children: 4
- Parent(s): Md Hanipah Sheikh Alauddin; Che Liah Hassan
- Occupation: Politician

Ahmad Bashah bin Md Hanipah is a Malaysian politician. He is a member of the United Malays National Organisation (UMNO), a component party in the Barisan Nasional (BN) coalition. He was the Menteri Besar of Kedah from 4 February 2016 to 10 May 2018. He was appointed as Menteri Besar after Mukhriz Mahathir agreed to step down after losing majority support in the state assembly. Ahmad Bashah was sworn in as Menteri Besar of Kedah the day after Mukhriz resigned, on February 4, 2016.

Following his appointment as Menteri Besar, Ahmad Bashah resigned as the Deputy Minister of Domestic Trade, Co-operatives and Consumerism and as a Senator.

In the 2018 election, Ahmad Bashah failed to retain the Suka Menanti state seat when he lost to Zamri Yusuf, of the People's Justice Party (PKR), in a three-corner fight with Mohd Sabri Omar of Pan-Malaysian Islamic Party (PAS).

== Controversies and issues ==
On 16 August 2016, Alor Setar MP Gooi Hsiao Leung blasted Ahmad Bashah for accusing foreign countries of intervening in Malaysia's administration to topple its leader. Gooi asked if Ahmad Bashah was referring to the United States Department of Justice (DOJ) lawsuits to seize some US$1 billion worth of assets in the US bought with "stolen money" from 1Malaysia Development Berhad (1MDB).

Ahmad Bashah had said that he did not want any "foreign element" to determine the country's future leaders and to take over what the government had developed.

== Election results ==
Kedah State Legislative Assembly
Year	Constituency	Candidate	Votes	Pct	Opponent(s)	Votes	Pct	Ballots cast	Majority	Turnout
1995	N14 Alor Merah	Ahmad Bashah Md Hanipah (UMNO)	9,558	69.10%	Fadzil Ahmad (PAS)	3,965	28.66%	13,833	5,593	71.14%
1999	N14 Alor Merah	Ahmad Bashah Md Hanipah (UMNO)	8,850	58.66%	Fadzil Ahmad (PAS)	5,928	39.30%	15,086	2,922	71.77%
2004	N12 Bakar Bata	Ahmad Bashah Md Hanipah (UMNO)	11,091	67.89%	Ismail Salleh (PAS)	5,054	30.94%	16,336	6,037	75.72%
2008	N12 Bakar Bata	Ahmad Bashah Md Hanipah (UMNO)	8,232	51.21%	Rohani Bakar (PKR)	7,874	48.01%	16,395	358	72.24%
2013	N12 Bakar Bata	Ahmad Bashah Md Hanipah (UMNO)	11,999	50.72%	Mohd Eekmal Ahmad (PKR)	11,104	46.94%	23,658	895	84.30%
2013	N12 Bakar Bata	Ahmad Bashah Md Hanipah (UMNO)	11,999	50.72%	Jawahar Raja Abdul Wahid (MUPP)	192	0.81%	23,658	895	84.30%
2018	N12 Suka Menanti	Ahmad Bashah Md Hanipah (UMNO)	7,050	28.28%	Zamri Yusuf (PKR)	13,301	53.35%	25,371	6,251	81.04%
2018	N12 Suka Menanti	Ahmad Bashah Md Hanipah (UMNO)	7,050	28.28%	Mohd Sabri Omar (PAS)	4,580	18.37%	25,371	6,251	81.04%

== Honours ==
=== Honours of Malaysia ===
- Malaysia
  - Medal of the Order of the Defender of the Realm (PPN) (1985)
- Kedah
  - Member of the Order of the Crown of Kedah (AMK) (1994)
  - Companion of the Order of Loyalty to the Royal House of Kedah (SDK) (1996)
  - Knight Companion of the Order of Loyalty to the Royal House of Kedah (DSDK) – Dato' (2002)
  - Knight Commander of the Order of Loyalty to Sultan Abdul Halim Mu'adzam Shah (DHMS) – Dato' Paduka (2006)
  - Knight Grand Companion of the Order of Loyalty to the Royal House of Kedah (SSDK) – Dato' Seri (2014)
  - Grand Commander of the Order of Loyalty to Sultan Abdul Halim Mu'adzam Shah (SHMS) – Dato' Seri Diraja (2017)

Government offices
Preceded by Mukhriz Mahathir	Menteri Besar of Kedah; 2016–2018	Succeeded by Mukhriz Mahathir
