= 2002 Pendang by-election =

Election in Malaysia

- 18 July 2002

Pendang seat in the Dewan Rakyat
		PAS
Candidate	Othman Abdul	Mohd Hayati Othman
Party	BN (UMNO)	PAS
Alliance		BA
Popular vote	22,825	22,542
Percentage	50.31%	49.69%
MP before election
Fadzil Noor
PAS
Elected MP
Othman Abdul
BN (UMNO)

The 2002 Pendang by-election is a by-election for the Dewan Rakyat federal seat of Pendang, Malaysia that were held on 18 July 2002. It was called following the death of the incumbent, Fadzil Noor on 23 June 2002.

The by election was held on the same day as the 2002 Anak Bukit by-election.

== Background ==
Fadzil Noor, then president of Pan-Malaysian Islamic Party (PAS), were elected to the Parliament of Malaysia federal seat of Pendang at the 1999 Malaysian general election, winning the seat from Barisan Nasional (BN). He also won the Anak Bukit state seat in the 1999 Kedah state election, held at the same time as the general election.

On 23 June 2002, Fadzil died at Hospital Universiti Kebangsaan Malaysia, Cheras, almost two weeks after undergoing a heart bypass surgery. His death means that both Pendang federal seat and Anak Bukit state seat were vacated. This necessitates for by-election for both seats to be held, as the seat were vacated more that 2 years before the expiry of both Kedah assembly and Malaysian parliament current terms. Election Commission of Malaysia announced on 29 June 2002 that the by-election for both seats will be held on 18 July 2002, with 10 July 2002 set as the nomination day.

== Nomination and campaign ==
After nomination closed, it was confirmed that BN will face PAS in a straight fight for the Pendang seat. BN nominated Othman Abdul, the United Malays National Organization (UMNO) Pendang division chief, and the previous holder of the seat for three terms before losing to Fadzil in 1999. PAS meanwhile nominated Mohd Hayati Othman, a committee member of the party's Pendang division and a local medical practitioner.

== Timeline ==
The key dates are listed below.

Date	Event
29 June 2002	Issue of the Writ of Election
10 July 2002	Nomination Day
10–17 July 2002	Campaigning Period
	Early polling day for postal and overseas voters
18 July 2002	Polling Day

== Results ==
Malaysian general by-election, 18 July 2002: Pendang Upon the death of incumbent, Fadzil Noor
Party	Candidate	Votes	%	∆%
BN	Othman Abdul	22,825	50.31	▲3.62
PAS	Mohd Hayati Othman	22,542	49.69	▼3.62
Total valid votes		45,367	100.00	
Total rejected ballots		346		
Unreturned ballots		0		
Turnout		45,713	86.04	▲4.96
Registered electors		53,128		
Majority		283	0.62	▼6.40
BN gain from PAS		Swing	N/A	

== Previous results ==
Malaysian general election, 1999: Pendang
Party	Candidate	Votes	%	∆%
PAS	Ali @ Fadzil Md Noor	22,413	53.51	▲6.01
BN	Othman Abdul	19,474	46.49	▼6.01
Total valid votes		41,887	100.00	
Total rejected ballots		758		
Unreturned ballots		647		
Turnout		43,292	81.08	▲3.57
Registered electors		53,388		
Majority		2,939	7.02	▲2.02
PAS gain from BN		Swing	N/A	
