= 2002 Anak Bukit by-election =

Election in Malaysia

← 1999	18 July 2002	2004 →

Anak Bukit seat in the Kedah State Legislative Assembly
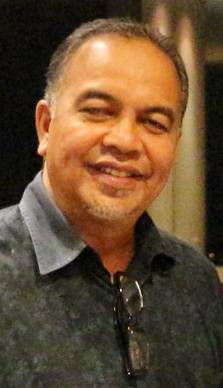
		BN
Candidate	Amiruddin Hamzah	Zakaria Said
Party	PAS	BN (UMNO)
Alliance	BA
Popular vote	8,298	7,790
Percentage	51.58%	48.92%
Anak Bukit assemblyman before election
Fadzil Noor
PAS
Elected Anak Bukit assemblyman
Amiruddin Hamzah
PAS

The 2002 Anak Bukit by-election is a by-election for the Kedah State Legislative Assembly state seat of Anak Bukit, Malaysia that were held on 18 July 2002. It was called following the death of the incumbent, Fadzil Noor on 23 June 2002.

The by election was held on the same day as the 2002 Pendang by-election.

== Background ==
Fadzil Noor, then president of Pan-Malaysian Islamic Party (PAS), were elected to the Kedah State Legislative Assembly state seat of Anak Bukit at the 1999 Kedah state election, winning the seat from Barisan Nasional (BN). He also won the Pendang state seat in the 1999 Malaysian general election, held at the same time as the state election.

On 23 June 2002, Fadzil died at Hospital Universiti Kebangsaan Malaysia, Cheras, almost two weeks after undergoing a heart bypass surgery. His death means that both Anak Bukit state seat and Pendang federal seat were vacated. This necessitates for by-election for both seats to be held, as the seat were vacated more that 2 years before the expiry of both Kedah assembly and Malaysian parliament current terms. Election Commission of Malaysia announced on 29 June 2002 that the by-election for both seats will be held on 18 July 2002, with 10 July 2002 set as the nomination day.

== Nomination and campaign ==
After nomination closed, it was confirmed that BN will face PAS in a straight fight for the Anak Bukit seat. BN nominated Datuk Zakaria Said from United Malays National Organization (UMNO), and the previous holder of the seat for three terms from 1982 to 1995, before switching to Kuala Kedah federal seat and won in 1995. PAS meanwhile nominated Amiruddin Hamzah, a former councillor for Kubang Pasu district and a former engineer at Muda Agricultural Development Authority (MADA) from 1984 to 1996. At the time of his nomination, Amiruddin is a management and training consultant.

== Timeline ==
The key dates are listed below.

Date	Event
29 June 2002	Issue of the Writ of Election
10 July 2002	Nomination Day
10–17 July 2002	Campaigning Period
	Early polling day for postal and overseas voters
18 July 2002	Polling Day

== Results ==
Kedah state by-election, 18 July 2002: Anak Bukit Upon the death of incumbent, Fadzil Noor
Party	Candidate	Votes	%	∆%
PAS	Amiruddin Hamzah	8,298	51.58	▼4.50
BN	Zakaria Said	7,790	48.92	▲4.50
Total valid votes		16,088	100.00	
Total rejected ballots		127		
Unreturned ballots		0		
Turnout		16,220	83.61	▲5.72
Registered electors		19,399		
Majority		508	2.66	▼9.50
PAS hold		Swing	N/A	

=== Previous result ===
Kedah state election, 1999: Anak Bukit
Party	Candidate	Votes	%	∆%
PAS	Fadzil Noor	8,480	56.08	▲8.18
BN	Abdullah Hasnan Kamaruddin	6,640	43.92	▼8.18
Total valid votes		15,120	100.00	
Total rejected ballots		230		
Unreturned ballots		13		
Turnout		15,363	77.89	▲2.57
Registered electors		19,723		
Majority		1,840	12.16	▲7.96
PAS gain from BN		Swing	N/A	
