= Mohamed Taulan Mat Rasul =

Malaysian politician

Yang Berbahagia Datuk Mohamed Taulan Mat Rasul DSDK PCK JP

Member of the Kedah State Executive Council
- In office 21 February 2013 – 2013 (Religion, Education and Cooperatives, Rural Development and Poverty Eradication)
- Monarch: Abdul Halim
- Menteri Besar: Azizan Abdul Razak
- Constituency: Tokai
- In office 2009 – 2013 (Religion, Education and Cooperatives)
- Monarch: Abdul Halim
- Menteri Besar: Azizan Abdul Razak
- Constituency: Tokai
- In office 12 March 2008 – 2009 (Housing and Local Government)
- Monarch: Abdul Halim
- Menteri Besar: Azizan Abdul Razak
- Constituency: Tokai

Member of the Kedah State Legislative Assembly for Tokai
- In office 21 March 2004 – 9 May 2018
- Preceded by: Constituency renamed from Bukit Raya
- Succeeded by: Mohd Hayati Othman (GS–PAS)
- Majority: 4,179 (1999); 3,006 (2008); 5,833 (2013)

Member of the Kedah State Legislative Assembly for Bukit Raya
- In office 29 November 1999 – 21 March 2004
- Succeeded by: Constituency renamed to Tokai
- Majority: 5,184 (1999)

Personal details
- Born: 23 February 1942
- Died: 27 January 2025 (aged 82)
- Party: Malaysian Islamic Party (PAS)
- Other political affiliations: Barisan Alternatif (BA) (1999–2004} Pakatan Rakyat (PR) (2008–2015} Gagasan Sejahtera (GS) (2018–2020); Perikatan Nasional (PN) (2020–present)

Mohamed Taulan bin Mat Rasul (23 February 1942 — 27 January 2025) was a Malaysian politician. He has served as Member of the Kedah State Executive Council (EXCO) in Pakatan Rakyat (PR) administration under Menteri Besar Azizan Abdul Razak from 2008 to 2013 as well as Member of the Kedah State Legislative Assembly for Tokai from March 2004 to May 2018 and Bukit Raya from November 1999 to March 2004. He was a member of Malaysian Islamic Party (PAS), a component party of Perikatan Nasional (PN), formerly Barisan Alternatif (BA), Pakatan Rakyat (PR) and Gagasan Sejahtera (GS) coalitions.

== Political career ==
Mohamed Taulan Mat Rasul made his electoral debut in 1995 general election for Pendang parliamentary seat, but lost to BN-UMNO candidate Othman Abdul with majority of 1,933. In 1999 general election, he was elected as Bukit Raya assemblyman with majority of 5,184, defeating BN-UMNO candidate Abdullah Bahari, at the time of the Reformasi movement.

In 2004 general election, he was elected as Tokai assemblyman with majority of 4,179. In 2008 general election, he was re-elected as Tokai assemblyman and appointed Member of the Kedah State Executive Council from 2008 to 2013.

After serving 4 terms in Kedah State Legislative Assembly, he was not nominated to contest 2018 general election.

== Death ==
On 27 January 2025, Mohamed Taulan Mat Rasul died.

== Election results ==
Parliament of Malaysia
Year	Constituency	Candidate	Votes	Pct	Opponent(s)	Votes	Pct	Ballots cast	Majority	Turnout
1995	P011 Pendang	Mohamed Taulan Mat Rasul (PAS)	18,389	47.50%	Othman Abdul (UMNO)	20,322	52.50%	39,881	1,933	77.51%

Kedah State Legislative Assembly
Year	Constituency	Candidate	Votes	Pct	Opponent(s)	Votes	Pct	Ballots cast	Majority	Turnout
1999	N18 Bukit Raya	Mohamed Taulan Mat Rasul (PAS)	13,653	61.72%	Abdullah Bahari (UMNO)	8,469	38.28%	22,436	5,184	81.51%
2004	N18 Tokai	Mohamed Taulan Mat Rasul (PAS)	14,790	58.23%	Shamsuddin Tahir (UMNO)	10,611	41.77%	25,642	4,179	87.65%
2008	N18 Tokai	Mohamed Taulan Mat Rasul (PAS)	13,871	56.08%	Fatimah Ismail (UMNO)	10,865	43.92%	25,296	3,006	83.68%
2013	N18 Tokai	Mohamed Taulan Mat Rasul (PAS)	18,005	58.55%	Najmuddin Darus (UMNO)	12,172	39.58%	30,751	5,833	88.80%

== Honours ==
- Kedah
  - State of Kedah Distinguished Service Medal (PCK) (1982)
  - Knight Companion of the Order of Loyalty to the Royal House of Kedah (DSDK) – Dato' (2008)
  - Justice of the Peace (JP) (2012)
