= Amiruddin Hamzah =

Malaysian politician (born 1962)

Yang Berbahagia Dato' Wira Amiruddin Hamzah DGMK DSDK JP
- أميرالدين حمزة
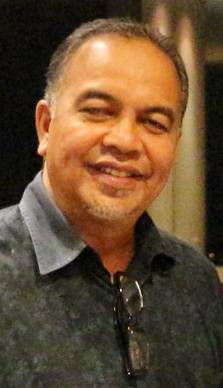

Deputy Minister of Finance
- In office 2 July 2018 – 24 February 2020
- Monarchs: Muhammad V (2018–2019); Abdullah (2019–2020)
- Prime Minister: Mahathir Mohamad
- Minister: Lim Guan Eng
- Preceded by: Othman Aziz (Deputy Minister of Finance I); Lee Chee Leong (Deputy Minister of Finance II)
- Succeeded by: Abdul Rahim Bakri (Deputy Minister of Finance I); Mohd Shahar Abdullah (Deputy Minister of Finance II)
- Constituency: Kubang Pasu

Member of the Kedah State Executive Council
- In office 22 May 2018 – 1 August 2018
- Monarch: Sallehuddin
- Menteri Besar: Mukhriz Mahathir
- Portfolio: Finance, State-owned Companies, Industry, Investment and Religion
- Preceded by: Ahmad Bashah Md Hanipah (Finance and State-owned Companies); Ku Abdul Rahman Ku Ismail (Industry and Investment); Mohd Rawi Abdul Hamid (Religion)
- Succeeded by: Mukhriz Mahathir (Finance); Ismail Salleh (State-owned Companies and Religion); Tan Kok Yew (Industry and Investment)
- Constituency: Anak Bukit
- In office 12 March 2008 – 6 May 2013
- Monarch: Abdul Halim
- Menteri Besar: Azizan Abdul Razak
- Portfolio: Industry, Investment, Agriculture, Science and Innovation (12 March 2008–12 March 2012); Industry, Investment, Housing, Public Works, Agriculture, Agro-Based Industry and Biotechnology (12 March 2012–6 May 2013)
- Preceded by: Chong Itt Chew (Industry, Investment, Science and Innovation); Shuib Saedin (Agriculture)
- Succeeded by: Ku Abdul Rahman Ku Ismail (Industry and Investment); Badrul Hisham Hashim (Housing); Tajul Urus Mat Zain (Public Works); Suraya Yaacob (Agriculture, Agro-based Industry and Biotechnology)
- Constituency: Anak Bukit

Member of the Malaysian Parliament for Kubang Pasu
- In office 9 May 2018 – 19 November 2022
- Preceded by: Mohd Johari Baharum (BN–UMNO)
- Succeeded by: Ku Abdul Rahman Ku Ismail (PN–BERSATU)
- Majority: 13,009 (2018)

Member of the Kedah State Legislative Assembly for Anak Bukit
- In office 18 July 2002 – 12 August 2023
- Preceded by: Fadzil Noor (BA–PAS)
- Succeeded by: Rashidi Razak (PN–PAS)
- Majority: 508 (2002); 96 (2004); 3,806 (2008); 2,806 (2013); 1,579 (2018)

1st Secretary-General of the Homeland Fighters Party
- Incumbent
- Assumed office 12 August 2020
- President: Mukhriz Mahathir
- Chairman: Mahathir Mohamad (2020–2022)
- Preceded by: Position established

Personal details
- Born: Amiruddin bin Hamzah; 20 April 1962 (age 64) Kuala Kedah, Kedah, Federation of Malaya (now Malaysia)
- Citizenship: Malaysian
- Party: Malaysian Islamic Party (PAS) (–2017); Malaysian United Indigenous Party (BERSATU) (2017–2020); Independent (2020); Homeland Fighters Party (PEJUANG) (since 2020)
- Other political affiliations: Barisan Alternatif (BA) (1999–2004); Pakatan Rakyat (PR) (2008–2015); Pakatan Harapan (PH) (2017–2020)
- Spouse: Nora Mohamed Noor
- Education: University of Bradford
- Occupation: Politician

Amiruddin bin Hamzah (Jawi: أميرالدين بن حمزة; born 20 April 1962) is a Malaysian politician who served as the Deputy Minister of Finance in the Pakatan Harapan (PH) administration from July 2018 to the collapse of the PH administration in February 2020, Member of the Kedah State Executive Council (EXCO) in the Pakatan Rakyat (PR) state administration from March 2008 to the collapse of the PR state administration in May 2013 and again in the PH state administration from May 2018 to August 2018, Member of Parliament (MP) for Kubang Pasu from May 2018 to November 2022, Leader of the Opposition of Kedah and Member of the Kedah State Legislative Assembly (MLA) for Anak Bukit from July 2002 to August 2023. He is a member of the Homeland Fighters Party (PEJUANG). He has served as the 1st and founding Secretary-General of PEJUANG since party foundation in August 2020. He was a member of the Malaysian United Indigenous Party (BERSATU), a component party of the Perikatan Nasional (PN) and formerly the PH coalition and Malaysian Islamic Party (PAS), a component party of the PN and formerly PR and Barisan Alternatif (BA) coalitions. He also served as the State Deputy Commissioner of PAS of Kedah.

== Election results ==
Kedah State Legislative Assembly
| Year | Constituency | Candidate | Votes | Pct | Opponent(s) | Votes | Pct | Ballots cast | Majority | Turnout |
|---|---|---|---|---|---|---|---|---|---|---|
| 2002 | N15 Anak Bukit | Amiruddin Hamzah (PAS) | 8,298 | 51.58% | Zakaria Said (UMNO) | 7,790 | 48.92% | 16,220 | 508 | 83.61% |
| 2004 | N15 Anak Bukit | Amiruddin Hamzah (PAS) | 10,240 | 50.05% | Abd Muthalib Harun (UMNO) | 10,144 | 49.58% | 20,641 | 96 | 84.17% |
| 2008 | N15 Anak Bukit | Amiruddin Hamzah (PAS) | 12,493 | 57.10% | Harisfadzilah Hussain (UMNO) | 8,687 | 30.71% | 21,877 | 3,806 | 83.46% |
| 2013 | N15 Anak Bukit | Amiruddin Hamzah (PAS) | 13,822 | 54.66% | Hashim Jahaya (UMNO) | 11,016 | 43.57% | 25,286 | 2,806 | 87.30% |
| 2013 | N15 Anak Bukit | Amiruddin Hamzah (PAS) | 13,822 | 54.66% | Abd Samat Che Noh (IND) | 85 | 0.34% | 25,286 | 2,806 | 87.30% |
| 2018 | N15 Anak Bukit | Amiruddin Hamzah (BERSATU) | 9,831 | 42.30% | Hamdi Ishak (PAS) | 8,231 | 35.42% | 23,241 | 1,579 | 82.35% |
| 2018 | N15 Anak Bukit | Amiruddin Hamzah (BERSATU) | 9,831 | 42.30% | Johari Aziz (UMNO) | 5,200 | 22.37% | 23,241 | 1,579 | 82.35% |

Parliament of Malaysia
| Year | Constituency | Candidate | Votes | Pct | Opponent(s) | Votes | Pct | Ballots cast | Majority | Turnout |
|---|---|---|---|---|---|---|---|---|---|---|
| 1999 | P004 Langkawi | Amiruddin Hamzah (PAS) | 5,802 | 31.97% | Abu Bakar Taib (UMNO) | 12,349 | 68.03% | 18,566 | 6,547 | 80.43% |
| 2018 | P006 Kubang Pasu | Amiruddin Hamzah (BERSATU) | 29,984 | 49.70% | Mohd Johari Baharum (UMNO) | 16,975 | 28.14% | 61,452 | 13,009 | 83.18% |
| 2018 | P006 Kubang Pasu | Amiruddin Hamzah (BERSATU) | 29,984 | 49.70% | Norhafiza Fadzil (PAS) | 13,375 | 22.17% | 61,452 | 13,009 | 83.18% |
| 2022 | P006 Kubang Pasu | Amiruddin Hamzah (PEJUANG) | 5,329 | 6.39% | Ku Abdul Rahman Ku Ismail (BERSATU) | 47,584 | 57.05% | 83,402 | 31,584 | 77.07% |
| 2022 | P006 Kubang Pasu | Amiruddin Hamzah (PEJUANG) | 5,329 | 6.39% | Mohd Aizuddin Ariffin (PKR) | 16,000 | 19.18% | 83,402 | 31,584 | 77.07% |
| 2022 | P006 Kubang Pasu | Amiruddin Hamzah (PEJUANG) | 5,329 | 6.39% | Hasmuni Hassan @ Tok Muni (UMNO) | 14,489 | 17.37% | 83,402 | 31,584 | 77.07% |

== Honours ==
- Kedah
  - Knight Commander of the Glorious Order of the Crown of Kedah (DGMK) – Dato' Wira (2019)
  - Knight Companion of the Order of Loyalty to the Royal House of Kedah (DSDK) – Dato' (2009)
  - Justice of the Peace (JP) (2013)
