= Tokai, Kedah =

Coordinates: 6°01′N 100°24′E

Tokai in Pendang District

Tokai is a small town in Pendang District, Kedah, Malaysia.
