= Mohd Hayati Othman =

Malaysian politician (born 1958)

Yang Berhormat Dato' Dr. Mohd Hayati Othman DSDK MLA
- محمد حياتي عثمان

Member of the Kedah State Executive Council
- In office 20 May 2020 – 14 August 2023 (Health and Local Government)
- Monarch: Sallehuddin
- Menteri Besar: Muhammad Sanusi Md Nor
- Preceded by: Ismail Salleh (Health); Tan Kok Yew (Local Government)
- Succeeded by: Mansor Zakaria (Local Government and Health)
- Constituency: Tokai

Member of the Kedah State Legislative Assembly for Tokai
- Incumbent
- Assumed office 9 May 2018
- Preceded by: Mohamed Taulan Mat Rasul (PR–PAS)
- Majority: 8,049 (2018); 23,919 (2023)

Faction represented in Dewan Rakyat
- 2004–2013: Malaysian Islamic Party

Faction represented in Kedah State Legislative Assembly
- 2018–2020: Malaysian Islamic Party
- 2020–: Perikatan Nasional

Personal details
- Born: Mohd Hayati bin Othman; 12 June 1958 (age 68) Kedah, Federation of Malaya (now Malaysia)
- Citizenship: Malaysian
- Party: Malaysian Islamic Party (PAS)
- Other political affiliations: Perikatan Nasional (PN); Gagasan Sejahtera (GS); Pakatan Rakyat (PR); Barisan Alternatif (BA)
- Occupation: Politician
- Website: mppendang.blogspot.com

Mohd Hayati bin Othman (born 12 June 1958) is a Malaysian politician who has served as Member of the Kedah State Legislative Assembly (MLA) for Tokai since May 2018. He served as the Member of Parliament (MP) for Pendang from March 2004 to May 2013. He is a member of the Malaysian Islamic Party (PAS), a component party of the PN and formerly Gagasan Sejahtera (GS), Pakatan Rakyat (PR) and Barisan Alternatif (BA) coalitions.

Hayati was elected to the Pendang seat in the 2004 election with a 50-vote margin. Two years earlier, he had been defeated in a by-election for the seat occasioned by the death of PAS's leader Fadzil Noor. The 2004 victory was a rare win for PAS in an election where it lost 20 of its 27 seats. Hayati then increased his majority in the 2008 election. He had contested the seat in a by-election in 2002, but was defeated by Othman Abdul of the United Malay National Organisation. He was replaced as the PAS candidate for Pendang ahead of the 2013 election, to make way for the party's deputy president Mat Sabu, and the party lost the seat to the United Malays National Organisation (UMNO).

== Election results ==
Parliament of Malaysia
Year	Constituency	Candidate	Votes	Pct	Opponent(s)	Votes	Pct	Ballots cast	Majority	Turnout
2002	P011 Pendang	Mohd Hayati Othman (PAS)	22,542	49.69%	Othman Abdul (UMNO)	22,825	50.31%	45,713	283	86.04%
2004	P011 Pendang	Mohd Hayati Othman (PAS)	24,430	50.05%	Md Rozai Shafian (UMNO)	24,380	49.95%	49,193	50	86.03%
2008	P011 Pendang	Mohd Hayati Othman (PAS)	27,311	54.03%	Md Rozai Shafian (UMNO)	23,238	45.97%	51,645	4,073	84.19%

Kedah State Legislative Assembly
Year	Constituency	Candidate	Votes	Pct	Opponent(s)	Votes	Pct	Ballots cast	Majority	Turnout
2018	N18 Tokai	Mohd Hayati Othman (PAS)	15,941	52.33%	Fatahi Omar (UMNO)	7,892	25.90%	30,895	8,049	85.19%
2018	N18 Tokai	Mohd Hayati Othman (PAS)	15,941	52.33%	Mohd Firdaus Jaafar (AMANAH)	6,632	21.77%	30,895	8,049	85.19%
2023	N18 Tokai	Mohd Hayati Othman (PAS)	29,329	84.43%	Zainal Abidin Saad (AMANAH)	5,410	15.57%	34,936	23,919	77.00%

== Honours ==
- Kedah
  - Knight Companion of the Order of Loyalty to the Royal House of Kedah (DSDK) – Dato' (2010)
  - Member of the Order of the Crown of Kedah (AMK)
