= Pendang District =

District in Kedah, Malaysia

- District of Kedah
- Daerah Pendang
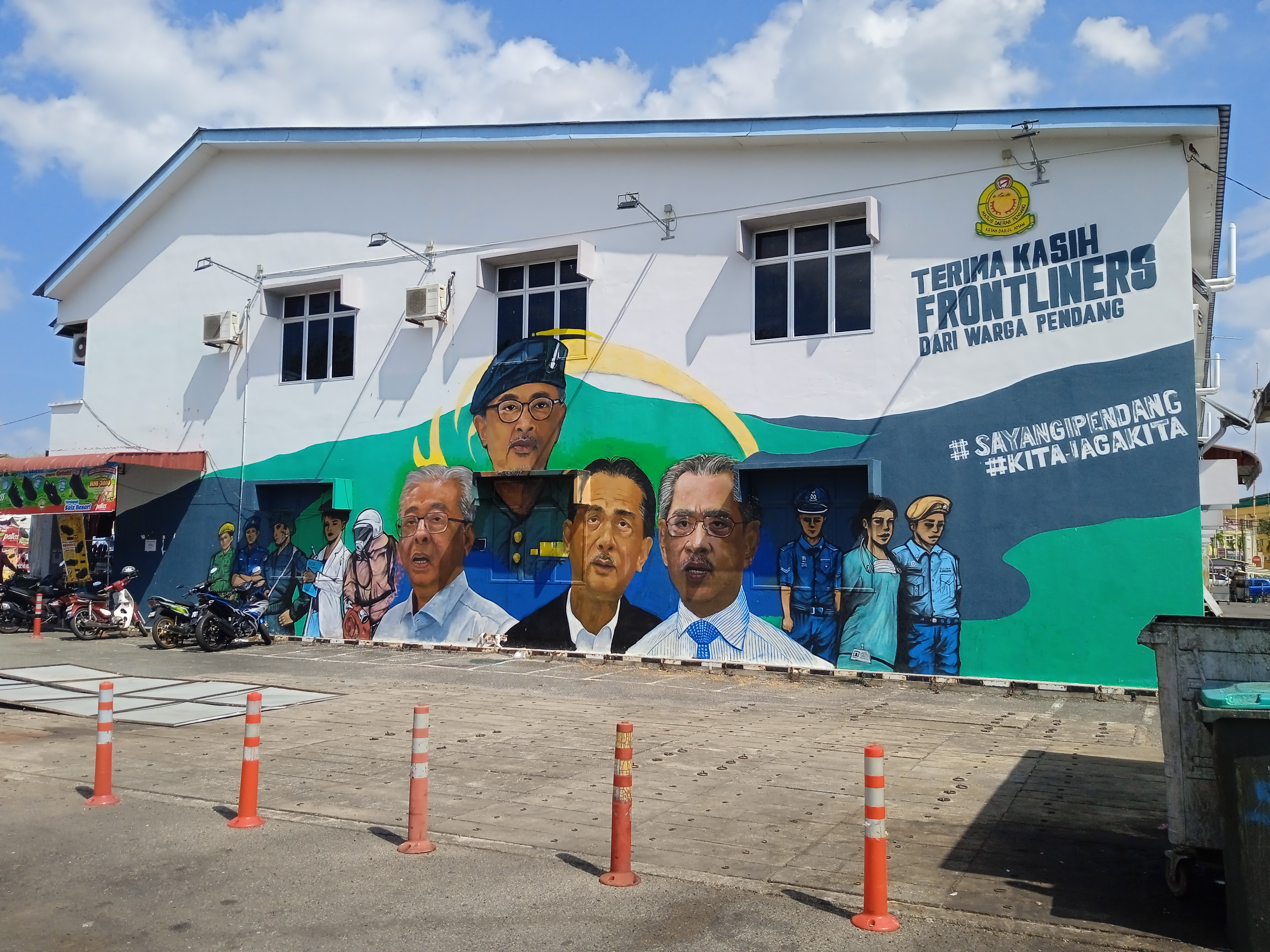

- Seal

- Location of Pendang District in Kedah
- Interactive map of Pendang District
- Location of Pendang District in Malaysia
- Coordinates: 6°0′N 100°28′E
- Country: Malaysia
- State: Kedah
- Seat: Pendang
- Local area government(s): Pendang District Council

Government
  - District officer: Ilias Shuib

Area
  - Total: 629.29 km^{2} (242.97 sq mi)

Population (2010)
  - Total: 94,033
  - Density: 149.43/km^{2} (387.01/sq mi)
- Time zone: UTC+8 (MST)
  - Summer (DST): UTC+8 (Not observed)
- Postcode: 06xxx
- Calling code: +6-04
- Vehicle registration plates: K

Pendang District Council Majlis Daerah Pendang

Type
- Type: Local authority

History
- Founded: 1 Mac 1979

Leadership
- President: Ilias Shuib
- District Secretary: Muhammad Annas Baharudin

Meeting place
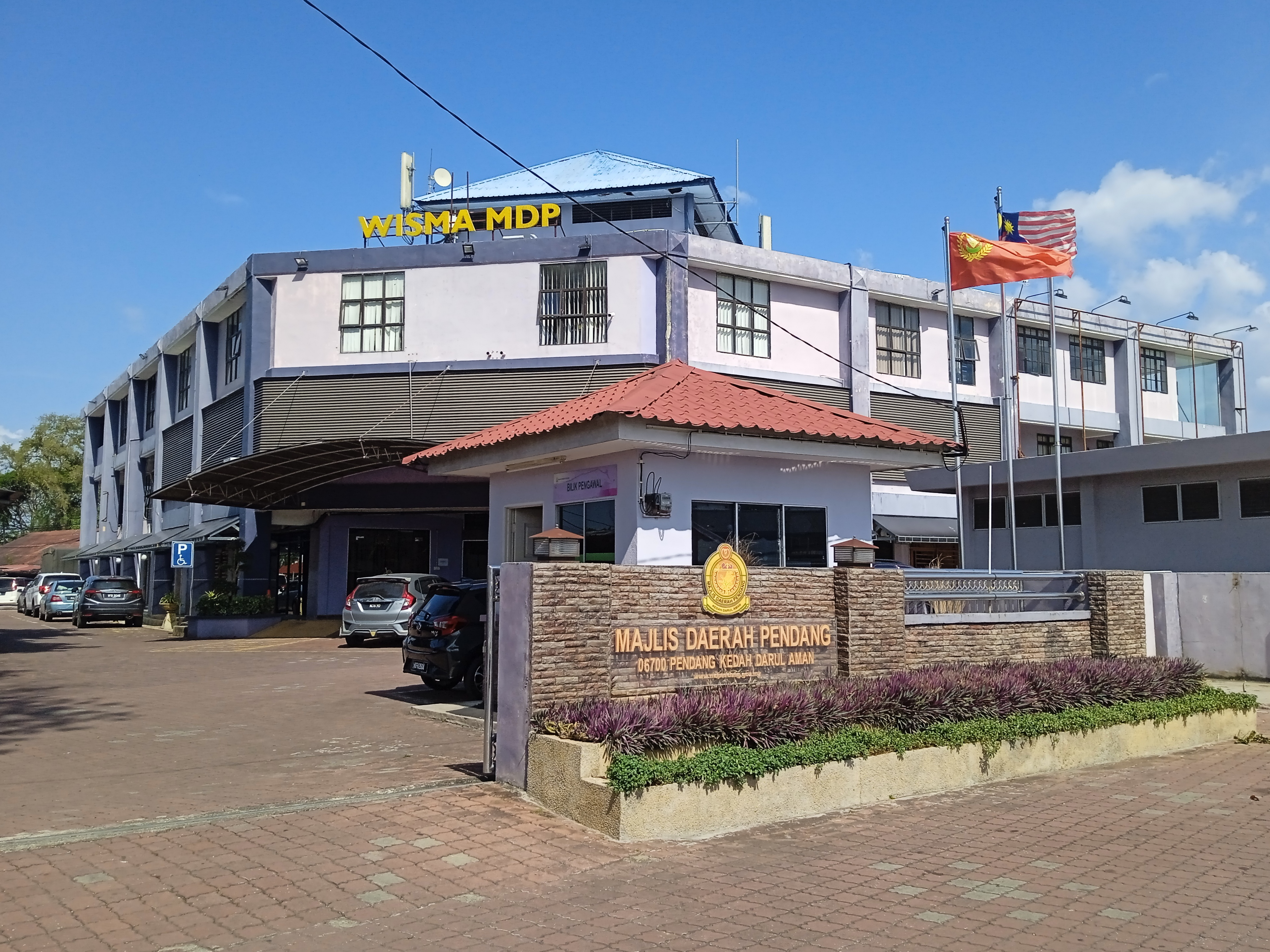
- Wisma MDP, 06700, Pendang, Kedah Darul Aman.

Website
- pbt.kedah.gov.my/index.php/majlis-daerah-pendang/

The Pendang District is a town, a district and a parliamentary constituency in Kedah, Malaysia. The district is primarily covered with paddy fields with agriculture being its main economic activity. Pendang town is about 20 km from state capital Alor Setar.

== History ==
Historically, Pendang was one of the largest breeding grounds for the elephants used to transport tributary goods to Thailand. Pendang was previously part of Alor Setar, and was contested as Kota Star Selatan until the 1980s. Pendang became a district in its own right in February 1975.

== Administrative divisions ==
Map of Pendang District

Pendang District is divided into 8 mukims, which are:

- Air Puteh
- Bukit Raya
- Guar Kepayang
- Padang Kerbau
- Padang Peliang
- Padang Pusing
- Rambai
- Tobiar

== Demographics ==
Historical population
Year	Pop.	±%
1991	83,092	—
2000	89,764	+8.0%
2010	93,598	+4.3%
2020	98,922	+5.7%

== Federal Parliament and State Assembly Seats ==
List of Pendang district representatives in the Federal Parliament (Dewan Rakyat)

Parliament	Seat Name	Member of Parliament	Party
P11	Pendang	Awang Hashim	Perikatan Nasional (PAS)

List of Pendang district representatives in the State Legislative Assembly (Dewan Undangan Negeri)

Parliament	State	Seat Name	State Assemblyman	Party
P11	N18	Tokai	Mohd Hayati Othman	Perikatan Nasional (PAS)
P11	N19	Sungai Tiang	Abdul Razak Khamis	Perikatan Nasional (WAWASAN)

== Tourist attractions ==
There is a famous Pendang Lake Recreational & Resort near the Pendang town centre. Other major attractions include Masjid Pendang, Stadium Mini Pendang and night market.

== Transportation ==
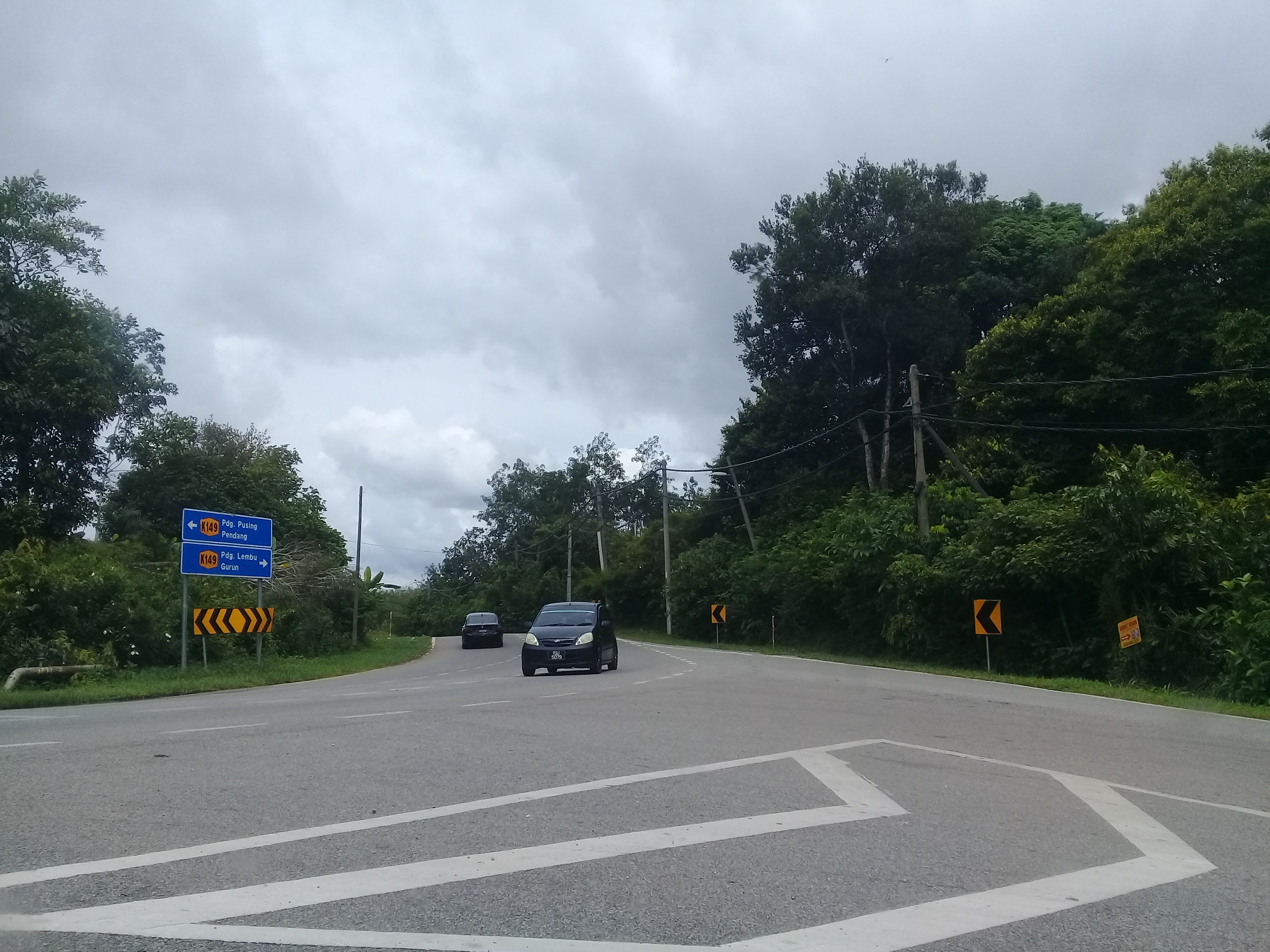
K149 Highway near Kampung Paya Mat Insun.

=== Car ===
The main road in the constituency is Jalan Raja Hasrul Raja Hassan, said to be the longest municipal named road in Kedah state – up to 85 kilometers. PLUS North–South Expressway Northern Route exit 175 serves Pendang town.

=== Public transportation ===
KTM Kobah is the only railway station serving Pendang constituency, providing ETS/Intercity and Komuter services.
