= Ulu Muda =

Kedah constituency

Defunct federal constituency
- Legislature: Dewan Rakyat
- Constituency created: 1974
- Constituency abolished: 1986
- First contested: 1974
- Last contested: 1982

Ulu Muda was a federal constituency in Kedah, Malaysia, that was represented in the Dewan Rakyat from 1974 to 1986.

The federal constituency was created in the 1974 redistribution and was mandated to return a single member to the Dewan Rakyat under the first past the post voting system.

== History ==
It was abolished in 1986 when it was redistributed.

=== Representation history ===
Members of Parliament for Ulu Muda
Parliament	No	Years	Member	Party	Vote Share
Constituency created from Kedah Tengah and Kota Star Selatan
4th	P009	1974–1978	Yusof Rawa (يوسف بن عبدالله)	BN (PAS)	Uncontested
5th	P009	1978–1982	Hashim Endut (هاشيم اندوت)	BN (UMNO)	11,195; 51.93%
6th	P009	1982–1983	Hashim Endut (هاشيم اندوت)	BN (UMNO)	15,271; 56.60%
6th	P009	1983–1986	Othman Abdul (عثمان عبدول)	BN (UMNO)	14,939; 58.90%
Constituency abolished, split into Sik and Pendang

=== State constituency ===
Parliamentary constituency	State constituency						
Parliamentary constituency	1955–1959*	1959–1974	1974–1986	1986–1995	1995–2004	2004–2018	2018–present
Ulu Muda			Pendang				
Ulu Muda			Sik				

=== Historical boundaries ===
State Constituency	Area
State Constituency	1974
Pendang	Kampung China; Kampung Tanjung Setul; Pendang; Sungai Tiang; Titi Akar
Sik	Belantek; Danglau; Gulau; Kampung Batu Besar; Sik

== Election results ==
Malaysian general by-election, 16 March 1983: Ulu Muda Upon the resignation of incumbent, Hashim Endut after he was convicted and fined $5,500 by a magistrate's court for not keeping proper accounts of sale, purchase and storage of rice and for stocking rice from illegal sources.
Party	Candidate	Votes	%	∆%
BN	Othman Abdul	14,939	58.90	▲2.30
PAS	Mohd. Nakhaie Ahmad	10,266	40.47	▼2.93
Independent	Ahmad Bakar	159	0.63	▲0.63
Total valid votes		25,364	100.00	
Total rejected ballots		333		
Unreturned ballots		0		
Turnout		25,697	75.28	▲6.01
Registered electors		34,133		
Majority		4,673	18.43	▲5.23
BN hold		Swing		

Malaysian general election, 1982: Ulu Muda
Party	Candidate	Votes	%	∆%
BN	Hashim Endut	15,271	56.60	▲4.67
PAS	Ali @ Fadzil Md Noor	11,711	43.40	▼3.44
Total valid votes		26,982	100.00	
Total rejected ballots		821		
Unreturned ballots		0		
Turnout		27,803	81.29	▲1.17
Registered electors		34,203		
Majority		3,560	13.20	▲8.11
BN hold		Swing		

Malaysian general election, 1978: Ulu Muda
Party	Candidate	Votes	%	∆%
BN	Hashim Endut	11,195	51.93	▲51.93
PAS	Harun Jusoh	10,097	46.84	▲46.84
Independent	Mohamed Zabidi Ahmad	266	1.23	▲1.23
Total valid votes		21,558	100.00	
Total rejected ballots		559		
Unreturned ballots		0		
Turnout		22,117	80.12	
Registered electors		27,605		
Majority		1,098	5.09	
BN hold		Swing		

Malaysian general election, 1974: Ulu Muda
Party	Candidate	Votes	%	∆%
On the nomination day, Yusof Abdullah won uncontested.
BN	Yusof Abdullah			
Total valid votes			100.00	
Total rejected ballots				
Unreturned ballots				
Turnout				
Registered electors		26,625		
Majority				
This was a new constituency created.
