= Muhamad Amri Wahab =

Malaysian politician

Yang Berhormat Tuan Muhamad Amri Wahab MLA

Member of the Kedah State Legislative Assembly for Derga
- Incumbent
- Assumed office 12 August 2023
- Preceded by: Tan Kok Yew (PH–DAP)
- Majority: 3,662 (2023)

Personal details
- Party: Malaysian United Indigenous Party (BERSATU)
- Other political affiliations: Perikatan Nasional (PN)
- Occupation: Politician

Muhamad Amri bin Wahab is a Malaysian politician. He was a member of the Kedah State Legislative Assembly (MLA) for Derga since August 2023. He is a member of Malaysian United Indigenous Party (BERSATU), a component party of Perikatan Nasional (PN) coalitions.

== Election results ==
Kedah State Legislative Assembly
Year	Constituency	Candidate	Votes	Pct	Opponent(s)	Votes	Pct	Ballots cast	Majority	Turnout
2023	N11 Derga	Muhamad Amri Wahab (BERSATU)	14,433	56.72%	Tan Kok Yew (DAP)	10,771	42.33%	25,560	3,662	67.43%
2023	N11 Derga	Muhamad Amri Wahab (BERSATU)	14,433	56.72%	Man Basiron (IND)	241	0.95%	25,560	3,662	67.43%
