= Abdul Razak Khamis =

Malaysian politician

Yang Berhormat Tuan Abdul Razak Khamis AMK MLA
- عبدالرزاق خميس

Deputy Speaker of the Kedah State Legislative Assembly
- Incumbent
- Assumed office 25 September 2023
- Monarch: Sallehuddin
- Menteri Besar: Muhammad Sanusi Md Nor
- Speaker: Zubir Ahmad
- Preceded by: Ahmad Fadzli Hashim
- Constituency: Sungai Tiang

Member of the Kedah State Legislative Assembly for Sungai Tiang
- Incumbent
- Assumed office 12 August 2023
- Preceded by: Suraya Yaacob (BN–UMNO)
- Majority: 17,099 (2023)

Personal details
- Born: 28 June 1960 (age 66) Kampung Sungai Korok, Sungai Tiang, Pendang, Kedah, Federation of Malaya
- Party: Malaysian United Indigenous Party (BERSATU) (2020–2026); National Vision Party (Malaysia) (WAWASAN) (since 2026)
- Other political affiliations: Pakatan Harapan (PH) (–2020); Perikatan Nasional (PN) (2020–now)
- Occupation: Politician

Abdul Razak bin Khamis is a Malaysian politician who has served as Deputy Speaker of the Kedah State Legislative Assembly since September 2023 and Member of the Legislative Assembly (MLA) for Sungai Tiang since August 2023. He is a member of the Malaysian United Indigenous Party (BERSATU), a component party of the Perikatan Nasional (PN) coalition and formerly Pakatan Harapan (PH) coalitions.

== Election results ==
Kedah State Legislative Assembly
Year	Constituency	Candidate	Votes	Pct	Opponent(s)	Votes	Pct	Ballots cast	Majority	Turnout
2018	N19 Sungai Tiang	Abdul Razak Khamis (BERSATU)	8,028	25.23%	Suraya Yaacob (UMNO)	12,213	38.39%	32,395	641	84.14%
2018	N19 Sungai Tiang	Abdul Razak Khamis (BERSATU)	8,028	25.23%	Saiful Syazwan Shafie (PAS)	11,572	36.38%	32,395	641	84.14%
2023	N19 Sungai Tiang	Abdul Razak Khamis (BERSATU)	27,154	72.98%	Mohammad Fadzil Zolkipli (UMNO)	10,055	27.02%	37,449	17,099	75.79%

== Honours ==
- Kedah
  - Member of the Order of the Crown of Kedah (AMK) (2023)
