= Wan Saiful Wan Jan =

Malaysian politician

Yang Berhormat Datuk Wan Saiful Wan Jan PMW DTM MP
- وان سيف الوان جان

Vice President of Parti Wawasan Negara
- Incumbent
- Assumed office 20 June 2026

Chairman of the Perbadanan Tabung Pendidikan Tinggi Nasional
- In office 18 June 2018 – 17 June 2022
- Preceded by: Shamsul Anuar Nasarah
- Succeeded by: Apli Yusoff

3rd Information Chief of the Malaysian United Indigenous Party
- In office 8 September 2020 – 22 February 2023
- President: Muhyiddin Yassin
- Preceded by: Radzi Jidin
- Succeeded by: Razali Idris

Member of the Malaysian Parliament for Tasek Gelugor
- Incumbent
- Assumed office 19 November 2022
- Preceded by: Shabudin Yahaya (BN–UMNO)
- Majority: 12,252 (2022)

Personal details
- Born: Wan Saifulruddin bin Wan Jan; 21 June 1976 (age 50) Alor Setar, Kedah, Malaysia
- Party: Malaysian Islamic Party (PAS) (1992); Conservative Party of the United Kingdom (2005–2007); Malaysian United Indigenous Party (BERSATU) (2018–2025); Independent (2025–2026); Parti Wawasan Negara (WAWASAN) (2026–present)
- Other political affiliations: Pakatan Harapan (PH) (2018–2020); Perikatan Nasional (PN) (2020–present)
- Spouse(s): Alena Omar (died 2024); Nurul Maslina Mohd Sobri (married 2025)
- Occupation: Politician

Wan Saifulruddin bin Wan Jan (Jawi: وان سيفولرودّين بن وان جان; born 21 June 1976) better known as Wan Saiful Wan Jan, is a Malaysian politician who has served as the Member of Parliament (MP) for Tasek Gelugor since November 2022. He served as Chairman of the Perbadanan Tabung Pendidikan Tinggi Nasional (PTPTN) from June 2018 to June 2022 and Special Advisor to the Minister of Education Maszlee Malik from May to November 2018.

He is an independent. He was a member of the Malaysian United Indigenous Party (BERSATU), a component party of the Perikatan Nasional (PN) coalition and formerly Pakatan Harapan (PH) before that and served as its 3rd Information Chief from August 2020 to February 2023. He was also a member of the Conservative Party of the United Kingdom and the Malaysian Islamic Party (PAS).

== Corporate career ==
Before joining politics, Wan Saiful was Chief Executive Officer (CEO) of the Institute for Democracy and Economic Affairs (IDEAS) co-founded by YAM Tunku Zain Al-'Abidin ibni Tuanku Muhriz, the son of the Yang di-Pertuan Besar of Negeri Sembilan, Tuanku Muhriz ibni Almarhum Tuanku Munawir.

== Political career ==
=== Malaysia ===
Wan Saiful ran for election in the 2018 Malaysian general election, contesting the Pendang parliamentary seat for the Pakatan Harapan coalition (appearing on the ballot under the People's Justice Party symbol). Wan Saiful's opponents were Awang Hashim of the Ideas of Prosperity (PAS), Othman Abdul of the Barisan Nasional (UMNO) and Abdul Malik. Manaf, an independent candidate. In the four-cornered contest, Wan Saiful only got 14,901 votes, the third highest after Awang Hashim and Othman Abdul. Wan Saiful then won the Tasek Gelugor parliamentary seat in the 2022 Malaysian general election, winning 46% of the vote in a five-cornered fight. On 14 October 2025, the Disciplinary Board of BERSATU announced his membership termination after receiving written complaints from party members and summoning him for a hearing session on 8 October 2025 about his breach of Party Constitution and Members' Code of Conduct.

=== United Kingdom ===
Prior to being active in Malaysian politics, Wan Saiful had a short political stint during his time living in the UK from 1993 to 2009. He was a former member of the UK Conservative Party back in 2005 and participated in the election of the Luton City Council member as a candidate of the Conservative Party in 2007. Wan Saiful and Howard Lee are the only two notable Malaysian politicians who had contested in the UK local elections, with Howard Lee contesting in Norwich. Both are currently members of parliament in the Dewan Rakyat, with Howard Lee representing the Ipoh Timor constituency.

== Controversies ==
On 21 February 2023, Wan Saiful was charged with corruption related to the Jana Wibawa programme. The next day, he resigned as the BERSATU Information Chief and it was accepted by BERSATU President Muhyiddin Yassin. He appealed to the public not to link him with the "court cluster" (referring to Deputy Prime Minister Ahmad Zahid Hamidi and others who were facing court charges) in the government led by Prime Minister Anwar Ibrahim.

On 28 February 2024, Wan Saiful, as the Tasek Gelugor MP, alleged that he was offered RM 1.7 million to declare support for Prime Minister Anwar and his government during a debate and speech in Parliament. Government backbenchers Kampar MP Chong Zhemin, Jelutong MP RSN Rayer, Ipoh Timor MP Howard Lee Chuan How, Sungai Petani MP Mohammed Taufiq Johari, Hulu Langat MP Mohd Sany Hamzan among others challenged Wan Saiful to lodge reports to the Royal Malaysia Police (PDRM) and the Malaysian Anti-Corruption Commission (MACC) if he was brave enough to do so. He also alleged that the person who was corrupt and abused his power would have an audience with the Yang di-Pertuan Agong before the Cabinet meeting every week. It was believed that he was referring to Prime Minister Anwar who was practising the convention of having a weekly audience with the Yang di-Pertuan Agong prior to the Cabinet meeting without naming him. Wan Saiful then retracted his remarks after being ordered by Speaker of the Dewan Rakyat Johari Abdul and requested by the government backbenchers to do so. On 29 January 2024, Chief Commissioner of MACC Azam Baki rubbished the allegations. On 4 March 2024, he further warned Wan Saiful to report the bribe attempts to the MACC by 10 March 2024 or appropriate actions would be taken against him. On 5 March 2024, Wan Saiful admitted that he was referring to Prime Minister Anwar, made an apology to Yang di-Pertuan Agong Sultan Ibrahim and Anwar for making the allegations during his debate in Parliament and once again retracted his remarks. Deputy Prime Minister Ahmad Zahid then withdrew a parliamentary motion to suspend Wan Saiful as an MP for six months following his allegations and remarks. On 9 March 2024, Leader of the Opposition and Larut MP Hamzah Zainudin added that the MACC had no rights to dictate anyone on the timing to lodge a report in response to the warning of Azam and defence of Wan Saiful.

== Election results ==
Parliament of Malaysia
Year	Constituency	Candidate	Votes	Pct	Opponent(s)	Votes	Pct	Ballots cast	Majority	Turnout
2018	P011 Pendang	Wan Saiful Wan Jan (BERSATU)	14,901	23.94%	Awang Hashim (PAS)	26,536	42.63%	63,371	5,808	84.64%
2018	P011 Pendang	Wan Saiful Wan Jan (BERSATU)	14,901	23.94%	Othman Abdul (UMNO)	20,728	33.30%	63,371	5,808	84.64%
2018	P011 Pendang	Wan Saiful Wan Jan (BERSATU)	14,901	23.94%	Abdul Malik Manaf (IND)	81	0.13%	63,371	5,808	84.64%
2022	P042 Tasek Gelugor	Wan Saiful Wan Jan (BERSATU)	31,116	46.36%	Muhamad Yusoff Mohd Noor (UMNO)	18,864	28.11%	67,112	12,252	82.99%
2022	P042 Tasek Gelugor	Wan Saiful Wan Jan (BERSATU)	31,116	46.36%	Razak Ridzuan (AMANAH)	16,547	24.66%	67,112	12,252	82.99%
2022	P042 Tasek Gelugor	Wan Saiful Wan Jan (BERSATU)	31,116	46.36%	Abdul Halim Sirjung (PEJUANG)	406	0.60%	67,112	12,252	82.99%
2022	P042 Tasek Gelugor	Wan Saiful Wan Jan (BERSATU)	31,116	46.36%	Mohd Akmal Azhar (WARISAN)	179	0.27%	67,112	12,252	82.99%

== Honours ==
=== Honours of Malaysia ===
- Malaysia
  - Recipient of the 17th Yang di-Pertuan Agong Installation Medal (2024)
- Negeri Sembilan
  - Companion of the Order of Loyalty to Tuanku Muhriz (DTM) (2015)
- Federal Territory (Malaysia)
  - Commander of the Order of the Territorial Crown (PMW) – Datuk (2021)
