= 1980 Bukit Raya by-election =

By-election in Malaysia in 1980

← 1978	5 April 1980	1982 →

N12 Bukit Raya seat in the Kedah State Legislative Assembly
- Turnout: 13,611
	BN	PAS
Candidate	Safirol Hashim	Fadzil Noor
Party	UMNO	PAS
Alliance	BN	PAS
Popular vote	6,801	6,732
Percentage	49.98%	49.47%
MLA before election
Ismail Kasim
PAS
Elected MLA
Kamarudin Mohd Nor
BN (UMNO)

The 1980 Bukit Raya by-election was a by-election that was held on 5 April 1980 for the Kedah State Legislative Assembly seat of Bukit Raya. It was called following the death of its PAS assemblyman Ismail Kasim. Ismail won the seat on 1978 Malaysian state elections against Abdul Aziz Ali of Barisan Nasional with a majority of 1,101.

Safirol Hashim of Barisan Nasional wrest the seat against PAS Fadzil Noor with a super slim majority of 69 votes.

== Nomination ==
Barisan Nasional nominated Kedah vice chairman of 4B Youth movement, Safirol Hashim. PAS nominated former Malaysian Islamic Youth Movement vice president and former Universiti Teknologi Malaysia lecturer, Fadzil Noor.

== Results ==
Kedah state by-election, 5 April 1980: Bukit Raya upon the death of incumbent Ismail Kasim
Party	Candidate	Votes	%	∆%
BN	Safirol Hashim	6,801	49.98	
PAS	Fadzil Noor	6,732	49.47	
Total valid votes		9,989	99.15	
Total rejected ballots		75	0.55	
Unreturned ballots		0		
Turnout		13,611	81.30	
Registered electors		16,618		
Majority		69	0.50	
BN gain from PAS		Swing		?
