= Rashidi Razak =

Malaysian politician

Yang Berhormat Tuan Rashidi Razak MLA
- رشيدي رزاق

Member of the Kedah State Legislative Assembly for Anak Bukit
- Incumbent
- Assumed office 12 August 2023
- Preceded by: Amiruddin Hamzah (PH–BERSATU)
- Majority: 15,831 (2023)

Personal details
- Citizenship: Malaysia
- Party: Malaysian Islamic Party (PAS)
- Other political affiliations: Perikatan Nasional (PN)
- Occupation: Politician

Rashidi bin Razak is a Malaysian politician who has served as Member of the Kedah State Legislative Assembly (MLA) for Anak Bukit since August 2023. He is a member of Malaysian Islamic Party (PAS), a component party of Perikatan Nasional (PN) coalitions.

== Election results ==
Kedah State Legislative Assembly
| Year | Constituency | Candidate | Votes | Pct | Opponent(s) | Votes | Pct | Ballots cast | Majority | Turnout |
|---|---|---|---|---|---|---|---|---|---|---|
| 2023 | N15 Anak Bukit | Rashidi Razak (PAS) | 21,738 | 78.63% | Noor Hasita Md Isa (UMNO) | 5,907 | 21.37% | 27,822 | 15,831 | 76.24% |
