= Yusof Rawa =

Malaysian politician (1922–2000)

- يوسف عبدالله راوا

1st Spiritual Leader of the Malaysian Islamic Party
- In office 1987–1995
- Preceded by: Position established
- Succeeded by: Nik Abdul Aziz Nik Mat

5th President of the Malaysian Islamic Party
- In office 1982–1989
- Preceded by: Asri Muda
- Succeeded by: Fadzil Noor

Personal details
- Born: Yusof bin Abdullah; 8 May 1922 Lebuh Acheh, George Town, Penang, Straits Settlements
- Died: 27 April 2000 (aged 77)
- Cause of death: Pneumonia
- Spouse: Kalsom Ali
- Children: Mujahid Yusof Rawa (son)
- Parent: Abdullah Nordin al-Rawi
- Nickname: Pak Yusof

Yusof bin Abdullah (Jawi: يوسف بن عبدالله; 8 May 1922 – 27 April 2000) was a Malaysian politician who served as the Member of Parliament (MP), 1st Spiritual Leader and 5th President of the Malaysian Islamic Party (PAS) from 1987 to 1995 and from 1982 to 1989 respectively. His legal name was Yusof Abdullah. He was the father of Mujahid Yusof Rawa, the Senator and Deputy President of the National Trust Party (AMANAH).

== Early career ==
Yusof joined PAS in 1951, and notably unseated future Prime Minister Mahathir Mohamad from the seat of Kota Setar Selatan in the 1969 election. Yusof was appointed as a Deputy Minister while PAS was a member of the governing Barisan Nasional coalition in the 1970s, and also served as Malaysia's Ambassador to Afghanistan, Turkey and Iran. He also served as Malaysian delegate to the United Nations.

== President of PAS ==
Yusof became the President of PAS in 1982, winning the post uncontested after a leadership crisis in the party. His election was seen as a victory for the ulama faction of the party as his predecessor, Asri Muda, was considered not an alim. Asri's leadership was notable for the shifting of PAS's outlook towards Malay nationalism. Both joining the Barisan Nasional coalition and moving away from religious-based policy platforms caused the party to lose support.

Yusof subsequently attempted to increase the influence of the ulama within PAS, surrounding himself with ulama leaders such as Nik Abdul Aziz Nik Mat and Abdul Hadi Awang. The direction of his leadership of the party was seen as firmly Islamist: under his presidency, the party adopted an Islamic State as official policy, and proposed to limit the powers of Parliament to be subject to the oversight of an "Ulama Assembly". At the same time, he steered the party away from Malay nationalism and introduced significant changes to the party's internal structure. One change was to introduce the position of "Spiritual Leader", of which he was the first occupant. His leadership style has been described as "fiery and outspoken". He resigned in 1989 citing health reasons, and was replaced by his deputy Fadzil Noor, who set the party on a more moderate path.

== Personal life ==
Yusof died in Penang on 28 April 2000. His son, Mujahid Yusof Rawa, became a member of parliament in 2008 and a Minister in the Prime Minister's Department for Religious Affairs in 2018.

== Election results ==
Parliament of Malaysia
Year	Constituency	Candidate	Votes	Pct	Opponent(s)	Votes	Pct	Ballots cast	Majority	Turnout
1959	P038 Seberang Utara	Yusof Rawa (PAS)	4,537	26.25%	Ahmad Saaid (UMNO)	12,748	73.75%	17,534	8,211	76.31%
1964	P002 Perlis Selatan	Yusof Rawa (PAS)	7,250	40.88%	Mokhtar Ismail (UMNO)	10,486	59.12%	18,579	3,236	80.39%
1969	P008 Kota Star Selatan	Yusof Rawa (PAS)	13,021	51.97%	Mahathir Mohamad (UMNO)	12,032	48.03%	25,680	989	80.26%
1974	P009 Ulu Muda	Yusof Rawa (PAS)	Unopposed							
1982	P004 Kubang Pasu	Yusof Rawa (PAS)	8,763	26.33%	Mahathir Mohamad (UMNO)	24,524	73.67%	34,340	15,761	78.79%
1986	P039 Tasek Gelugor	Yusof Rawa (PAS)	6,796	29.93%	Mohammed Yusoff Abdul Latib (UMNO)	15,911	70.07%	23,269	9,115	75.01%

Political offices
Preceded by Asri Muda	President of the Pan-Malaysian Islamic Party; 1982–1989	Succeeded by Fadzil Noor
