= Tan Kok Yew =

Malaysian politician

- 陈国耀

Member of the Kedah State Executive Council
- In office 1 August 2018 – 17 May 2020
- Monarch: Sallehuddin
- Menteri Besar: Mukhriz Mahathir
- Portfolio: Industry, Investment, Local Government and Housing
- Preceded by: Amiruddin Hamzah (Industry and Investment); Himself (Local Government and Housing)
- Succeeded by: Ku Abdul Rahman Ku Ismail (Industry and Investment); Mohd Hayati Othman (Local Government); Robert Ling Kui Ee (Housing)
- In office 22 May 2018 – 1 August 2018
- Monarch: Sallehuddin
- Menteri Besar: Mukhriz Mahathir
- Portfolio: Tourism, Local Government and Housing
- Preceded by: Mohd Rawi Abd Hamid (Tourism); Badrol Hisham Hashim (Local Government and Housing)
- Succeeded by: Mohd Asmirul Anuar Aris (Tourism); Himself (Local Government and Housing)
- Constituency: Derga

Member of the Kedah State Legislative Assembly for Derga
- In office 5 May 2013 – 12 August 2023
- Preceded by: Cheah Soon Hai (BN–Gerakan)
- Succeeded by: Muhamad Amri Wahab (PN–BERSATU)
- Majority: 1,156 (2013); 5,265 (2018)

Faction represented in Kedah State Legislative Assembly
- 2013–2018: Democratic Action Party
- 2018–2023: Pakatan Harapan

Personal details
- Born: Tan Kok Yew; 27 April 1967 (age 58) Alor Setar, Kedah, Malaysia
- Citizenship: Malaysian
- Party: Democratic Action Party (DAP)
- Other political affiliations: Pakatan Rakyat (PR) (2008–2015); Pakatan Harapan (PH) (since 2015)
- Occupation: Politician

Tan Kok Yew

Chinese name
- Traditional Chinese: 陳國耀
- Simplified Chinese: 陈国耀
Transcriptions
Standard Mandarin
- Hanyu Pinyin: Chén Guóyào
Yue: Cantonese
- Jyutping: Can4 Gwok3 Jiu6
Southern Min
- Hokkien POJ: Tân Kok-iāu
- Tâi-lô: Tân Kok-iāu

Tan Kok Yew (simplified Chinese: 陈国耀; traditional Chinese: 陳國耀; pinyin: Chén Guóyào ; born 27 April 1967) is a Malaysian politician who served as Member of the Kedah State Executive Council (EXCO) in the Pakatan Harapan (PH) state administration under former Menteri Besar Mukhriz Mahathir from May 2018 to the collapse of the PH state administration in May 2020 and Member of the Kedah State Legislative Assembly (MLA) for Derga from May 2013 to August 2023. He is a member and State Chairman of Kedah of the Democratic Action Party (DAP), a component party of the PH coalition. He was also the only DAP candidate to lose in the 2023 state elections.

== Election results ==
Kedah State Legislative Assembly
Year	Constituency	Candidate	Votes	Pct	Opponent(s)	Votes	Pct	Ballots cast	Majority	Turnout
2013	N11 Derga	Tan Kok Yew (DAP)	10,358	47.91%	Cheah Soon Hai (Gerakan)	9,202	42.56%	21,953	1,156	82.60%
2013	N11 Derga	Tan Kok Yew (DAP)	10,358	47.91%	Abdul Fisol Mohd Isa (BERJASA)	2,061	9.53%	21,953	1,156	82.60%
2018	N11 Derga	Tan Kok Yew (DAP)	11,232	50.79%	Yahya Saad (PAS)	5,967	26.98%	22,495	5,265	80.80%
2018	N11 Derga	Tan Kok Yew (DAP)	11,232	50.79%	Cheah Soon Hai (Gerakan)	4,916	22.23%	22,495	5,265	80.80%
2023	N11 Derga	Tan Kok Yew (DAP)	10,771	42.33%	Muhamad Amri Wahab (BERSATU)	14,433	56.72%	25,560	3,662	67.43%
2023	N11 Derga	Tan Kok Yew (DAP)	10,771	42.33%	Noor Azman Basharon (IND)	241	0.95%	25,560	3,662	67.43%
