= Kota Setar (federal constituency) =

Kedah constituency

Defunct federal constituency
- Legislature: Dewan Rakyat
- Constituency created: 1955
- Constituency abolished: 1959
- Constituency re-created: 1974
- Constituency re-abolished: 1995
- First contested: 1955
- Last contested: 1990

Kota Setar was a federal constituency in Kedah, Malaysia, represented in the Dewan Rakyat since 1955 to 1959 and 1974 to 1995. It was created in the 1959 redistribution and was mandated to return a single member to the Dewan Rakyat under the first past the post voting system.

== History ==
It was abolished in 1995 when it was redistributed.

=== Representation history ===
Members of Parliament for Kota Setar
Parliament	No	Years	Member	Party
Constituency created
Kota Star
Federal Legislative Council
1st		1955–1959	Tunku Kassim Sultan Abdul Hamid (تونكو كسسيم سلطان عبدالحميد)	Alliance (UMNO)
Constituency split into Kota Star Selatan and Kota Star Utara
Constituency created from Kota Star Selatan and Kota Star Utara
Kota Setar
4th	P008	1974–1978	Abu Bakar Umar (ابو بكر عمر)	BN (PAS)
5th	P008	1978–1982	Abu Bakar Umar (ابو بكر عمر)	PAS
6th	P008	1982–1986	Abu Bakar Umar (ابو بكر عمر)	PAS
7th	P006	1986–1990	Abdul Hadi Derani (عبدالهادي دراني)	BN (UMNO)
8th	P006	1990–1995	[Wan Hanafiah Wan Mat Saman (وان حنفيه وان مت سامن)	BN (UMNO)
Constituency abolished, renamed to Pokok Sena

=== State constituency ===
Parliamentary constituency	State constituency						
Parliamentary constituency	1955–1959*	1959–1974	1974–1986	1986–1995	1995–2004	2004–2018	2018–present
Kota Setar			Bukit Raya				
Kota Setar				Derga			
Kota Setar				Langgar			
Kota Setar			Langgar-Limbong				
Kota Star	Kota Star Barat Laut						
Kota Star	Kota Star Selatan						

== Election results ==
Malaysian general election, 1990
Party	Candidate	Votes	%	∆%
BN	Wan Hanafiah Wan Mat Saman	18,223	55.09	▲2.61
PAS	Mohamad Shauki Ibrahim	14,856	44.91	▼2.61
Total valid votes		33,079	100.00	
Total rejected ballots		737		
Unreturned ballots		0		
Turnout		33,816	75.08	▲2.86
Registered electors		45,042		
Majority		3,367	10.18	▲5.22
BN hold		Swing		

Malaysian general election, 1986
Party	Candidate	Votes	%	∆%
BN	Abdul Hadi Derani	14,738	52.48	▲4.86
PAS	Halim Arshad	13,344	47.52	▼4.86
Total valid votes		28,082	100.00	
Total rejected ballots		644		
Unreturned ballots		0		
Turnout		28,726	72.22	▼8.87
Registered electors		39,775		
Majority		1,394	4.96	▲0.20
BN gain from National Trust Party (Malaysia)-Malaysian Islamic Party		Swing		?

Malaysian general election, 1982
Party	Candidate	Votes	%	∆%
PAS	Abu Bakar Umar	15,442	52.38	▼2.48
BN	Mustafa Ahmad	14,039	47.62	▲3.37
Total valid votes		29,481	100.00	
Total rejected ballots		580		
Unreturned ballots		0		
Turnout		30,061	81.09	▲0.23
Registered electors		37,073		
Majority		1,403	4.76	▼5.85
PAS hold		Swing		

Malaysian general election, 1978
Party	Candidate	Votes	%	∆%
PAS	Abu Bakar Umar	13,626	54.86	▲54.86
BN	Ghazali Ahmad	10,991	44.25	▼42.2
Independent	Kasim Ahmad	222	0.89	▲0.89
Total valid votes		24,839	100.00	
Total rejected ballots		511		
Unreturned ballots		0		
Turnout		25,350	80.86	▲10.03
Registered electors		31,351		
Majority		2,635	10.61	▼64.78
PAS gain from BN		Swing		?

Malaysian general election, 1974
Party	Candidate	Votes	%	∆%
BN	Abu Bakar Umar	16,475	86.37	
Independent	Kassim Ahmad	2,094	10.98	
Independent	Zakaria Ahmad @ Che Mat	507	2.66	
Total valid votes		19,076	100.00	
Total rejected ballots		959		
Unreturned ballots		0		
Turnout		20,035	70.83	
Registered electors		28,285		
Majority		14,381	75.39	
BN hold		Swing		

Malayan general election, 1955: Kota Star
Party	Candidate	Votes	%
Alliance	Tengku Kassim	27,357	92.66
National Party	Mohamed Rejab Darus	2,168	7.34
Total valid votes		29,525	100.00
Total rejected ballots			
Unreturned ballots			
Turnout		29,525	86.70
Registered electors		34,054	
Majority		25,189	85.32
This was a new constituency created.
Source(s): The Straits Times.
