= Othman Abdul =

Malaysian politician (born 1953)

Yang Berbahagia Dato' Wira Othman Abdul DGMK DSSA SDK
- عثمان عبدول

Parliamentary Secretary to the Prime Minister's Department
- In office 1997–1999 Serving with Muhammad Abdullah
- Monarchs: Ja'afar (1997–1999); Salahuddin (1999)
- Prime Minister: Mahathir Mohamad
- Minister in the Prime Minister's Department: Abdul Hamid Othman; Abang Abu Bakar Abang Mustapha; Chong Kah Kiat; Siti Zaharah Sulaiman; Tajol Rosli Mohd Ghazali
- Preceded by: Azmi Khalid
- Succeeded by: Noh Omar
- Constituency: Pendang
- In office 1990–1995
- Monarchs: Azlan Shah (1990–1994); Ja'afar (1994–1995)
- Prime Minister: Mahathir Mohamad
- Preceded by: Himself
- Succeeded by: Muhammad Abdullah
- Constituency: Pendang
- In office 1987–1990
- Monarchs: Iskandar (1987–1989); Azlan Shah (1989–1990)
- Prime Minister: Mahathir Mohamad
- Preceded by: Raja Ariffin Raja Sulaiman
- Succeeded by: Himself
- Constituency: Pendang

Faction represented in Dewan Rakyat
- 1986–1999: Barisan Nasional
- 2002–2004: Barisan Nasional
- 2013–2018: Barisan Nasional

Personal details
- Born: Othman bin Abdul; 7 July 1953 (age 73)
- Citizenship: Malaysian
- Party: United Malays National Organisation (UMNO)
- Other political affiliations: Barisan Nasional (BN); Perikatan Nasional (PN); Muafakat Nasional (MN)
- Occupation: Politician

Othman bin Abdul (born 7 July 1953) is a Malaysian corporate and political figure. He was the Member of the Parliament of Malaysia for the constituency of Pendang, Kedah. He held the seat for three times; from 1986 to 1999, from 2002 to 2004, and again from 2013 to 2018. He is a member of the United Malays National Organisation (UMNO) in Malaysia's previous governing Barisan Nasional (BN) coalition.

Othman was appointed as an independent non-executive director for the KSK Group Berhad (previously known as Kurnia Asia Bhd) on 13 April 2004. He is also the Chairman of the Nominating and Remuneration Committee and he is also appointed as one of the members of the Audit Committee.

== Education ==
Othman Abdul was a former student from the National University of Malaysia. He studied science, majoring in sociology. After graduating in 1978, he worked as an officer in the Family Planning Board and the Kedah State Development Corporation. From 1980 to 1983, he was the Assistant District Officer of Pendang.

== Political career ==
Othman was elected to Parliament in the 1986 election, for the seat of Pendang, Kedah, defeating Phahrolrazi Zawawi of the Pan-Malaysian Islamic Party (PAS) by 900 votes. He held the seat for three terms, before losing it at the 1999 election to PAS's leader Fadzil Noor. At the time of the 1999 election Othman was serving as a parliamentary secretary to Prime Minister Mahathir Mohamad.

When Fadzil Noor died in 2002, Othman stood as the Barisan Nasional candidate in the high-profile and closely fought by-election that followed. He won his seat back, defeating PAS's Mohd Hayati Othman by 283 votes. However, he was replaced as the Barisan Nasional candidate for the 2004 general election, and the coalition lost the seat to PAS.

Othman returned as the Barisan Nasional candidate for Pendang at the 2013 election. PAS had held the seat since 2004, but had decided to replace its incumbent member with the party's high-profile deputy president, Mohamad Sabu. Amid a swing to the Barisan Nasional across the state of Kedah, Othman won the seat by 2,638 votes, returning to Parliament for his third non-consecutive period in office.

Othman failed to retain the Pendang seat in a 4-corners fight in the 2018 election losing to the PAS candidate.

== Koperasi Islah Malaysia Berhad ==
Othman was also the KIMB (Koperasi Islah Malaysia Berhad) Chairman for four consecutive years. He also acted as the institution Audit Committee for KIMB up to June 2008. He is now replaced with Dr Haji Ahmad Zainuddin Bin Abdullah.

== Election results ==
Parliament of Malaysia
Year	Constituency	Candidate	Votes	Pct	Opponent(s)	Votes	Pct	Ballots cast	Majority	Turnout
1983	P009 Ulu Muda	Othman Abdul (UMNO)	14,939	58.90%	Mohd. Nakhaie Ahmad (PAS)	10,266	40.47%	25,697	4,673	75.28%
1983	P009 Ulu Muda	Othman Abdul (UMNO)	14,939	58.90%	Ahmad Bakar (IND)	159	0.63%	25,697	4,673	75.28%
1986	P009 Pendang	Othman Abdul (UMNO)	16,886	51.37%	Phahrolrazi Mohd Zawawi (PAS)	15,986	48.63%	33,452	900	77.92%
1990	P009 Pendang	Othman Abdul (UMNO)	20,554	54.23%	Fadzil Noor (PAS)	17,349	45.77%	38,768	3,205	82.57%
1995	P011 Pendang	Othman Abdul (UMNO)	20,322	52.50%	Mohd Taulan Mat Rasul (PAS)	18,389	47.50%	39,881	1,933	77.51%
1999	P011 Pendang	Othman Abdul (UMNO)	19,474	46.49%	Fadzil Noor (PAS)	22,413	53.51%	43,292	2,939	81.08%
2002	P011 Pendang	Othman Abdul (UMNO)	22,825	50.31%	Mohd Hayati Othman (PAS)	22,542	49.69%	45,713	283	86.04%
2013	P011 Pendang	Othman Abdul (UMNO)	32,165	52.14%	Mohamad Sabu (PAS)	29,527	47.86%	62,578	2,638	89.23%
2018	P011 Pendang	Othman Abdul (UMNO)	20,728	33.30%	Awang Solahudin Hashim (PAS)	26,536	42.63%	63,371	5,808	84.64%
2018	P011 Pendang	Othman Abdul (UMNO)	20,728	33.30%	Wan Saiful Wan Jan (BERSATU)	14,901	23.94%	63,371	5,808	84.64%
2018	P011 Pendang	Othman Abdul (UMNO)	20,728	33.30%	Abdul Malik Manaf (IND)	81	0.13%	63,371	5,808	84.64%

== Honours ==
- Kedah
  - Knight Commander of the Glorious Order of the Crown of Kedah (DGMK) – Dato' Wira (2008)
  - Companion of the Order of Loyalty to the Royal House of Kedah (SDK) (1994)
- Selangor
  - Knight Companion of the Order of Sultan Salahuddin Abdul Aziz Shah (DSSA) – Dato' (1996)

== See also ==
- Pendang (federal constituency)
