= Pendang (federal constituency) =

Federal constituency of Kedah, Malaysia

Pendang (P011)
Kedah constituency

Federal constituency
- Legislature: Dewan Rakyat
- MP: Awang Solahuddin Hashim; PN
- Constituency created: 1984
- First contested: 1986
- Last contested: 2022

Demographics
- Population (2020): 99,363
- Electors (2023): 94,788
- Area (km²): 629
- Pop. density (per km²): 158

Pendang is a federal constituency in Pendang District, Kedah, Malaysia, that has been represented in the Dewan Rakyat since 1986.

The federal constituency was created in the 1984 redistribution and is mandated to return a single member to the Dewan Rakyat under the first past the post voting system.

== Demographics ==
https://live.chinapress.com.my/ge15/parliament/KEDAH

Ethnic breakdown of Pendang's electorate as of 2022
1. Malay (88.6%)
2. Chinese (5.30%)
3. Other ethnicities (4.20%)
4. Indian (1.90%)

As of 2020, Pendang has a population of 99,363 people.

Age breakdown of Pendang's electorate as of 2022
1. 18-20 (6.11%)
2. 21-29 (20.8%)
3. 30-39 (21.9%)
4. 40-49 (17.7%)
5. 50-59 (14.8%)
6. 60-69 (10.7%)
7. 70-79 (5.55%)
8. 80-89 (2.07%)
9. above 90 (0.30%)
Gender breakdown of Pendang's electorate as of 2022
1. Male (48.6%)
2. Female (51.4%)

== History ==
=== Polling districts ===
According to the federal gazette issued on 18 July 2023, the Pendang constituency is divided into 44 polling districts.

State constituency	Polling Districts	Code	Location
Tokai (N18）	Sri Pudak	011/18/01	Maktab Mahmud Pendang
Tokai (N18）	Kepala Bukit	011/18/02	SK Penghulu Jusoh
Tokai (N18）	Kampung Penyarom	011/18/03	SMK Tobiar
Tokai (N18）	Tanah Merah	011/18/04	SK Tanah Merah
Tokai (N18）	Kampung Rambai	011/18/05	SK Kg Rambai
Tokai (N18）	Kubang Jelai	011/18/06	SK Haji Abdul Rahman
Tokai (N18）	Pekan Tokai	011/18/07	SMK Tokai
Tokai (N18）	Kampung Pulai	011/18/08	SK Kampung Pulai Tokai
Tokai (N18）	Alor Besar	011/18/09	SK Alor Besar
Tokai (N18）	Kobah	011/18/10	SK Bukit Choras
Tokai (N18）	Tempoyak	011/18/11	SMK Pendang
Tokai (N18）	Sebrang Pendang	011/18/12	SK Tunku Intan Safinaz
Tokai (N18）	Pekan Pendang	011/18/13	SJK (C) Yeang Cheng
Tokai (N18）	Bukit Raya	011/18/14	SK Bukit Raya Dalam
Tokai (N18）	Banggol Besi	011/18/15	SMK Tanah Merah
Tokai (N18）	Guar Kepayang	011/18/16	SK Guar Kepayang
Tokai (N18）	Cherok Kudong	011/18/17	SK Cherok Kudong
Tokai (N18）	Gajah Mati	011/18/18	SK Kampung Chegar
Tokai (N18）	Manggol Petai	011/18/19	SMK Tuanku Temenggung
Tokai (N18）	Paya Kelubi	011/18/20	SK Pendang
Tokai (N18）	Batu Manunggul	011/18/21	SK Ayer Puteh
Sungai Tiang (N19)	Kubor Panjang	011/19/01	SK Kubor Panjang
Sungai Tiang (N19)	Kampung Perupok	011/19/02	SK Bendang Raja
Sungai Tiang (N19)	Kampung China	011/19/03	SK Hujung Keton
Sungai Tiang (N19)	Padang Durian	011/19/04	SK Padang Durian
Sungai Tiang (N19)	Pokok Assam	011/19/05	SK Pokok Assam
Sungai Tiang (N19)	Kampung Belat	011/19/06	SMK Kubor Panjang
Sungai Tiang (N19)	Paya Rawa	011/19/07	SK Paya Rawa
Sungai Tiang (N19)	Kampung Bechah	011/19/08	SK Syed Ibrahim
Sungai Tiang (N19)	Titi Akar	011/19/09	Sekolah Bahasa Siam, Watt Siam Titi Akar
Sungai Tiang (N19)	Sungai Tiang Blok B	011/19/10	SMK Sungai Tiang
Sungai Tiang (N19)	Sungai Tiang Blok A	011/19/11	SK Sungai Tiang
Sungai Tiang (N19)	Kampung Mahawangsa Pendang	011/19/12	SK Sungai Siput
Sungai Tiang (N19)	Kampung Bahru	011/19/13	SK Kampong Baru
Sungai Tiang (N19)	Sawa Kechil	011/19/14	Ma'had Al-Imam As-Syafie, Sawa Kechil
Sungai Tiang (N19)	Padang Pusing	011/19/15	SMK Syed Ibrahim Padang Pusing
Sungai Tiang (N19)	Ayer Puteh	011/19/16	SK Hj Mohamad Ariff
Sungai Tiang (N19)	Bukit Jambol	011/19/17	SK Bukit Jambul
Sungai Tiang (N19)	Junun	011/19/18	SK Bukit Jenun
Sungai Tiang (N19)	Tanjong Setol	011/19/19	Sekolah Model Khas Bukit Jenun
Sungai Tiang (N19)	Bukit Genting	011/19/20	SK Bukit Genting
Sungai Tiang (N19)	Pokok Tai	011/19/21	SK Pokok Tai
Sungai Tiang (N19)	Paya Mak Inson	011/19/22	SK Paya Mak Insun
Sungai Tiang (N19)	Paya Mengkuang	011/19/23	SK Paya Mengkuang

=== Representation history ===
Members of Parliament for Pendang
Parliament	No	Years	Member	Party	Vote Share
Constituency created from Padang Terap, Ulu Muda and Kota Setar
7th	P009	1986–1990	Othman Abdul (عثمان عبدال)	BN (UMNO)	16,886; 51.37%
8th	P009	1990–1995	Othman Abdul (عثمان عبدال)	BN (UMNO)	20,554; 54.23%
9th	P011	1995–1999	Othman Abdul (عثمان عبدال)	BN (UMNO)	20,322; 52.50%
10th	P011	1999–2002	Fadzil Noor (فاذل نور)	BA (PAS)	22,413; 53.51%
10th	P011	2002–2004	Othman Abdul (عثمان عبدال)	BN (UMNO)	22,825; 50.31%
11th	P011	2004–2008	Mohd Hayati Othman (محمد حياتي عثمان)	PAS	24,430; 50.05%
12th	P011	2008–2013	Mohd Hayati Othman (محمد حياتي عثمان)	PR (PAS)	27,311; 54.03%
13th	P011	2013–2018	Othman Abdul (عثمان عبدال)	BN (UMNO)	32,165; 52.14%
14th	P011	2018–2020	Awang Solahuddin Hashim (اوڠ هشيم)	PAS	26,536; 42.63%
14th	P011	2020–2022	Awang Solahuddin Hashim (اوڠ هشيم)	PN (PAS)	26,536; 42.63%
15th	P011	2022–present	Awang Solahuddin Hashim (اوڠ هشيم)	PN (PAS)	49,008; 64.83%

=== State constituency ===
Parliamentary constituency	State constituency						
Parliamentary constituency	1955–1959*	1959–1974	1974–1986	1986–1995	1995–2004	2004–2018	2018–present
Pendang				Ayer Puteh			
Pendang				Bukit Raya			
Pendang					Sungai Tiang		
Pendang						Tokai	

=== Historical boundaries ===
State Constituency	Area			
State Constituency	1984	1994	2003	2018
Ayer Puteh	Kubur Panjang; Padang Durian; Senara; Sungai Tiang; Titi Akar			
Bukit Raya	Asam Jawa; Batu Hampar; Kobah; Tanah Merah; Tokai	Batu Hampar; Kobah; Pendang; Tanah Merah; Tokai		
Sungai Tiang		Ayer Puteh; Bukit Perah; Kampung Lampam; Kubur Panjang; Sungai Tiang		
Tokai			Batu Hampar; Kobah; Pendang; Tanah Merah; Tokai	

=== Current state assembly members ===
No.	State Constituency	Member	Coalition (Party)
N18	Tokai	Mohd Hayati Othman	PN (PAS)
N19	Sungai Tiang	Abdul Razak Khamis	PN (WAWASAN)

=== Local governments & postcodes ===
No.	State Constituency	Local Government	Postcode
N18	Tokai	Pendang District Council	06700, 06720, 06750 Pendang
N19	Sungai Tiang	Pendang District Council	06700, 06720, 06750 Pendang

== Election results ==
Malaysian general election, 2022
Party	Candidate	Votes	%	∆%
PN	Awang Solahuddin Hashim	49,008	64.83	▲64.83
BN	Suraya Yaacob	17,719	23.44	▼9.86
PH	Zulkifly Mohamad	8,058	10.66	▲10.66
PEJUANG	Abdul Rashid Yub	809	1.07	▲1.07
Total valid votes		75,594	100.00	
Total rejected ballots		650		
Unreturned ballots		137		
Turnout		76,381	79.95	▼4.69
Registered electors		94,547		
Majority		31,289	41.39	▲32.06
PN hold		Swing		
Source(s) https://lom.agc.gov.my/ilims/upload/portal/akta/outputp/1753260/PUB%20606%20(2022).pdf

Malaysian general election, 2018
Party	Candidate	Votes	%	∆%
PAS	Awang Solahuddin Hashim	26,536	42.63	▼5.23
BN	Othman Abdul	20,728	33.30	▼14.56
PKR	Wan Saifulruddin Wan Jan	14,901	23.94	▲23.94
Independent	Abdul Malik Manaf	81	0.13	▲0.13
Total valid votes		62,246	100.00	
Total rejected ballots		952		
Unreturned ballots		173		
Turnout		63,371	84.64	▼4.59
Registered electors		74,867		
Majority		5,808	9.33	▲5.05
PAS gain from BN		Swing		?
Source(s) "His Majesty's Government Gazette - Notice of Contested Election, Parliament for the State of Kedah [P.U. (B) 233/2018]" (PDF). Attorney General's Chambers of Malaysia. 3 May 2018. "Federal Government Gazette - Results of Contested Election and Statements of the Poll after the Official Addition of Votes, Parliamentary Constituencies for the State of Kedah [P.U. (B) 307/2018]" (PDF). Attorney General's Chambers of Malaysia. 28 May 2018.

Malaysian general election, 2013
Party	Candidate	Votes	%	∆%
BN	Othman Abdul	32,165	52.14	▲6.17
PAS	Mohamad Sabu	29,527	47.86	▼6.17
Total valid votes		61,692	100.00	
Total rejected ballots		759		
Unreturned ballots		127		
Turnout		62,578	89.23	▲5.04
Registered electors		70,135		
Majority		2,638	4.28	▼3.78
BN gain from PAS		Swing		?
Source(s) "Federal Government Gazette - Notice of Contested Election, Parliament for the State of Kedah [P.U. (B) 170/2013]" (PDF). Attorney General's Chambers of Malaysia. 26 April 2013. Archived from the original (PDF) on 29 December 2019. "Federal Government Gazette - Results of Contested Election and Statements of the Poll after the Official Addition of Votes, Parliamentary Constituencies for the State of Kedah [P.U. (B) 211/2013]" (PDF). Attorney General's Chambers of Malaysia. 22 May 2013.

Malaysian general election, 2008
Party	Candidate	Votes	%	∆%
PAS	Mohd Hayati Othman	27,311	54.03	▲3.98
BN	Md Rozai Shafian	23,238	45.97	▼3.98
Total valid votes		50,549	100.00	
Total rejected ballots		991		
Unreturned ballots		105		
Turnout		51,645	84.19	▼1.84
Registered electors		61,346		
Majority		4,073	8.06	▲7.96
PAS hold		Swing		

Malaysian general election, 2004
Party	Candidate	Votes	%	∆%
PAS	Mohd Hayati Othman	24,430	50.05	▲0.36
BN	Md Rozai Shafian	24,380	49.95	▼0.36
Total valid votes		48,810	100.00	
Total rejected ballots		383		
Unreturned ballots		0		
Turnout		49,193	86.03	▼0.01
Registered electors		57,181		
Majority		50	0.10	▼0.52
PAS gain from BN		Swing		?

Malaysian general by-election, 18 July 2002 Upon the death of incumbent, Fadzil Noor
Party	Candidate	Votes	%	∆%
BN	Othman Abdul	22,825	50.31	▲3.62
PAS	Mohd Hayati Othman	22,542	49.69	▼3.62
Total valid votes		45,367	100.00	
Total rejected ballots		346		
Unreturned ballots		0		
Turnout		45,713	86.04	▲4.96
Registered electors		53,128		
Majority		283	0.62	▼6.40
BN gain from PAS		Swing		?

Malaysian general election, 1999
Party	Candidate	Votes	%	∆%
PAS	Ali @ Fadzil Md Noor	22,413	53.51	▲6.01
BN	Othman Abdul	19,474	46.49	▼6.01
Total valid votes		41,887	100.00	
Total rejected ballots		758		
Unreturned ballots		647		
Turnout		43,292	81.08	▲3.57
Registered electors		53,388		
Majority		2,939	7.02	▲2.02
PAS gain from BN		Swing		?

Malaysian general election, 1995
Party	Candidate	Votes	%	∆%
BN	Othman Abdul	20,322	52.50	▼1.73
PAS	Mohamed Taulan Mat Rasul	18,389	47.50	▲1.73
Total valid votes		38,711	100.00	
Total rejected ballots		1,129		
Unreturned ballots		41		
Turnout		39,881	77.51	▼5.06
Registered electors		51,452		
Majority		1,933	5.00	▼3.46
BN hold		Swing		

Malaysian general election, 1990
Party	Candidate	Votes	%	∆%
BN	Othman Abdul	20,554	54.23	▲2.86
PAS	Ali @ Fadzil Md Noor	17,349	45.77	▼2.86
Total valid votes		37,903	100.00	
Total rejected ballots		865		
Unreturned ballots		0		
Turnout		38,768	82.57	▲4.65
Registered electors		46,951		
Majority		3,205	8.46	▲5.72
BN hold		Swing		

Malaysian general election, 1986
Party	Candidate	Votes	%
BN	Othman Abdul	16,886	51.37
PAS	Phahrolrazi Zawawi	15,986	48.63
Total valid votes		32,872	100.00
Total rejected ballots		580	
Unreturned ballots		0	
Turnout		33,452	77.92
Registered electors		42,930	
Majority		900	2.74
This was a new constituency created.
