= Suraya Yaacob =

Malaysian politician

Yang Berbahagia Dato' Suraya Yaacob PJN DSDK SDK JP
- ثرايا بنت يعقوب

Political Secretary to the Minister in the Prime Minister's Department (Law and Institutional Reforms)
- Incumbent
- Assumed office 27 January 2023
- Monarch: Abdullah
- Prime Minister: Anwar Ibrahim
- Minister: Azalina Othman Said
- Preceded by: Position established

Member of the Kedah State Executive Council
- In office 20 May 2020 – 13 October 2022; Public Works, Energy, Water Supply and Resources
- Monarch: Sallehuddin
- Menteri Besar: Muhammad Sanusi Md Nor
- Constituency: Sungai Tiang
- In office 15 May 2013 – 9 May 2018; Woman Development, Welfare, Entrepreneur Development, Agriculture and Agro-based
- Monarchs: Abdul Halim (2013–2017); Sallehuddin (2017–2018)
- Menteri Besar: Mukhriz Mahathir (2013–2016); Ahmad Bashah Md Hanipah (2016–2018)
- Constituency: Sungai Tiang

Member of the Kedah State Legislative Assembly for Sungai Tiang
- In office 21 March 2004 – 12 August 2023
- Preceded by: Md Rozai Shafian (BN–UMNO)
- Succeeded by: Abdul Razak Khamis (PN–BERSATU)
- Majority: 4,250 (2004); 3,006 (2008); 6,994 (2013); 641 (2018)

State Deputy Chairperson of the United Malays National Organisation of Kedah
- In office 20 December 2022 – 22 March 2023
- President: Ahmad Zahid Hamidi
- Chairman: Jamil Khir Baharom
- Preceded by: Othman Aziz
- Succeeded by: Abdul Azeez Abdul Rahim

Personal details
- Born: Suraya binti Yaacob; 10 April 1969 (age 57) Alor Setar, Kedah, Malaysia
- Citizenship: Malaysian
- Party: United Malays National Organisation (UMNO)
- Other political affiliations: Barisan Nasional (BN)
- Spouse(s): Syed Al-Fandi Syed Mansor Barakbah (d. 2014); Zulkifli Ishak
- Children: 2
- Occupation: Politician

Suraya binti Yaacob is a Malaysian politician who has served as Political Secretary to the Minister in the Prime Minister's Department in charge of Law and Institutional Reforms Azalina Othman Said since January 2023 and Member of the Kedah State Legislative Assembly (MLA) for Sungai Tiang from March 2004 to August 2023. She served as Member of the Kedah State Executive Council (EXCO) in the Barisan Nasional (BN) state administration under former Menteris Besar Mukhriz Mahathir and Ahmad Bashah Md Hanipah from May 2013 to the collapse of the BN state administration in May 2018 and again in the Perikatan Nasional (PN) state administration under Menteri Besar Muhammad Sanusi Md Nor from May 2020 to her resignation in October 2022. She is a member of the United Malays National Organisation (UMNO), a component party of the ruling BN coalition. She served as the State Deputy Chairperson of UMNO of Kedah from December 2022 to March 2023. She is the Division Chief of UMNO of Pendang. She also previously served as the State Information Chief of UMNO of Kedah before her promotion to the state deputy chairpersonship.

== Election results ==
Kedah State Legislative Assembly
Year	Constituency	Candidate	Votes	Pct	Opponent(s)	Votes	Pct	Ballots cast	Majority	Turnout
2004	N19 Sungai Tiang	Suraya Yaacob (UMNO)	13,948	58.99%	Ab Muthalib Awang (PAS)	9,698	41.01%	24,084	4,250	86.24%
2008	N19 Sungai Tiang	Suraya Yaacob (UMNO)	13,871	56.08%	Ab Muthalib Awang (PAS)	10,865	43.92%	25,296	3,006	83.68%
2013	N19 Sungai Tiang	Suraya Yaacob (UMNO)	18,929	60.60%	Fadzil Baharum (PAS)	11,935	38.25%	31,772	6,994	89.47%
2013	N19 Sungai Tiang	Suraya Yaacob (UMNO)	18,929	60.60%	Rosli Omar (IND)	192	0.62%	31,772	6,994	89.47%
2013	N19 Sungai Tiang	Suraya Yaacob (UMNO)	18,929	60.60%	Charean Isen (KITA)	139	0.45%	31,772	6,994	89.47%
2018	N19 Sungai Tiang	Suraya Yaacob (UMNO)	12,213	38.39%	Saiful Syazwan Shafie (PAS)	11,572	36.38%	32,395	641	84.00%
2018	N19 Sungai Tiang	Suraya Yaacob (UMNO)	12,213	38.39%	Abdul Razak Khamis (BERSATU)	8,028	25.23%	32,395	641	84.00%

Parliament of Malaysia
Year	Constituency	Candidate	Votes	Pct	Opponent(s)	Votes	Pct	Ballots cast	Majority	Turnout
2022	P011 Pendang	Suraya Yaacob (UMNO)	17,719	23.44%	Awang Hashim (PAS)	49,008	64.83%	76,381	31,289	79.95%
2022	P011 Pendang	Suraya Yaacob (UMNO)	17,719	23.44%	Zulkifly Mohamad (PKR)	8,058	10.66%	76,381	31,289	79.95%
2022	P011 Pendang	Suraya Yaacob (UMNO)	17,719	23.44%	Abdul Rashid Yub (PEJUANG)	809	1.07%	76,381	31,289	79.95%

== Honours ==
- Malaysia
  - Commander of the Order of Meritorious Service (PJN) – Datuk (2012)
- Kedah
  - Knight Companion of the Order of Loyalty to the Royal House of Kedah (DSDK) – Dato' (2014)
  - Companion of the Order of Loyalty to the Royal House of Kedah (SDK) (2010)
  - Justice of the Peace (JP) (2004)
