= Kota Star Selatan =

Kedah constituency

Defunct federal constituency
- Legislature: Dewan Rakyat
- Constituency created: 1958
- Constituency abolished: 1974
- First contested: 1959
- Last contested: 1969

Kota Star Selatan was a federal constituency in Kedah, Malaysia, that was represented in the Dewan Rakyat from 1959 to 1974.

The federal constituency was created in the 1974 redistribution and was mandated to return a single member to the Dewan Rakyat under the first past the post voting system.

== History ==
It was abolished in 1974 when it was redistributed.

=== Representation history ===
Members of Parliament for Kota Star Selatan
Parliament	No	Years	Member	Party	Vote Share
Constituency created from Kota Star
Parliament of the Federation of Malaya
1st	P008	1959–1963	Wan Sulaiman Wan Tam (وان سليمان وان تم)	Alliance (UMNO)	8,369; 51.68%
Parliament of Malaysia
1st	P008	1963–1964	Wan Sulaiman Wan Tam (وان سليمان وان تم)	Alliance (UMNO)	8,369; 51.68%
2nd	P008	1964–1969	Mahathir Mohamad (محاضير محمد)	Alliance (UMNO)	12,406; 60.22%
		1969–1971	Parliament was suspended		
3rd	P008	1971–1973	Yusof Rawa (يوسف بن عبدالله)	PMIP	13,021; 51.97%
3rd	P008	1973–1974	Yusof Rawa (يوسف بن عبدالله)	BN (PMIP)	13,021; 51.97%
Constituency abolished split into Ulu Muda, Kuala Kedah and Kota Setar

=== State constituency ===
Parliamentary constituency	State constituency						
Parliamentary constituency	1955–1959*	1959–1974	1974–1986	1986–1995	1995–2004	2004–2018	2018–present
Kota Star Selatan		Kangkong-Bukit Raya					
Kota Star Selatan		Pendang					

=== Historical boundaries ===
State Constituency	Area
State Constituency	1959
Kangkong-Bukit Raya	Bukit Raya; Kampung Perpat; Kampung Sungai Nonang; Kota Sarang Semut; Tanah Merah
Pendang	Kampung China; Kampung Tanjung Setul; Pendang; Sungai Tiang; Titi Akar

== Election results ==
Malaysian general election, 1969: Kota Star Selatan
Party	Candidate	Votes	%	∆%
PMIP	Yusof Abdullah	13,021	51.97	▲12.19
Alliance	Mahathir Mohamad	12,032	48.03	▼12.19
Total valid votes		25,053	100.00	
Total rejected ballots		627		
Unreturned ballots		0		
Turnout		25,680	80.26	▲2.59
Registered electors		31,995		
Majority		989	3.94	▼16.50
PMIP gain from Alliance		Swing		?

Malaysian general election, 1964: Kota Star Selatan
Party	Candidate	Votes	%	∆%
Alliance	Mahathir Mohamad	12,406	60.22	▲8.54
PMIP	Mohd Sha'ari Abdul Shukor	8,196	39.78	▼8.54
Total valid votes		20,602	100.00	
Total rejected ballots		838		
Unreturned ballots		0		
Turnout		21,440	82.79	▲5.05
Registered electors		25,898		
Majority		4,210	20.44	▲17.08
Alliance hold		Swing		

Malayan general election, 1959: Kota Star Selatan
Party	Candidate	Votes	%
Alliance	Wan Sulaiman Wan Tam	8,369	51.68
PMIP	Othman Yunus	7,824	48.32
Total valid votes		16,193	100.00
Total rejected ballots		185	
Unreturned ballots		0	
Turnout		16,378	77.74
Registered electors		21,069	
Majority		545	3.36
This was a new constituency created.
