= Awang Hashim =

Malaysian politician

Yang Berhormat Datuk Awang Solahuddin Hashim PMW MP
- اواڠ صلاح الدين هاشم
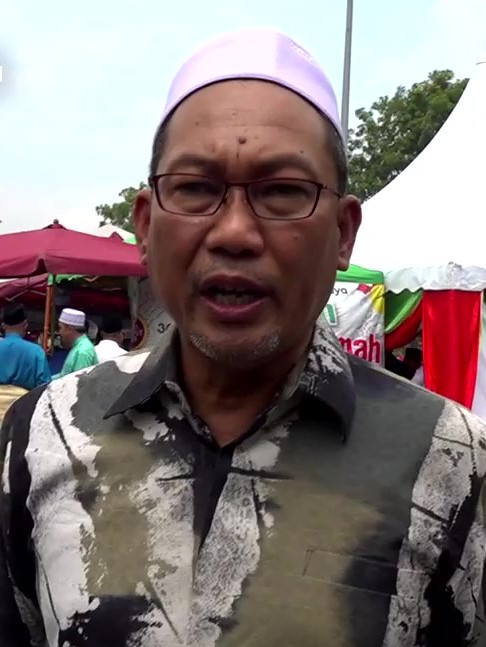
- Awang in 2019

Deputy Minister of Human Resources
- In office 30 August 2021 – 24 November 2022
- Monarch: Abdullah
- Prime Minister: Ismail Sabri Yaakob
- Minister: Saravanan Murugan
- Preceded by: Himself
- Succeeded by: Mustapha Sakmud
- Constituency: Pendang
- In office 10 March 2020 – 16 August 2021
- Monarch: Abdullah
- Prime Minister: Muhyiddin Yassin
- Minister: Saravanan Murugan
- Preceded by: Mahfuz Omar
- Succeeded by: Himself
- Constituency: Pendang

Member of the Malaysian Parliament for Pendang
- Incumbent
- Assumed office 9 May 2018
- Preceded by: Othman Abdul (BN–UMNO)
- Majority: 5,808 (2018); 31,289 (2022)

Faction represented in Dewan Rakyat
- 2018–2020: Malaysian Islamic Party
- 2020–: Perikatan Nasional

Personal details
- Born: Awang Solahuddin bin Hashim; 5 November 1964 (age 61) Kedah, Malaysia
- Citizenship: Malaysian
- Party: Malaysian Islamic Party (PAS)
- Other political affiliations: Gagasan Sejahtera (GS) (2016–2020); Perikatan Nasional (PN) (since 2020)
- Education: University Science of Malaysia
- Occupation: Politician
- Awang Hashim on Facebook

Awang Solahuddin bin Hashim (born 5 November 1964) is a Malaysian politician who has served as the Member of Parliament (MP) for Pendang since May 2018. He served as the Deputy Minister of Human Resources for the second term in the Barisan Nasional (BN) administration under former Prime Minister Ismail Sabri Yaakob and former Minister Saravanan Murugan from August 2021 to the collapse of the BN administration in November 2022 and the first term in the Perikatan Nasional (PN) administration under former Prime Minister Muhyiddin Yassin and former Minister Saravanan from March 2020 to the collapse of the PN administration in August 2021. He is a member of the Malaysian Islamic Party (PAS), a component party of the PN coalition.

== Election results ==
Parliament of Malaysia
Year	Constitiuency	Candidate	Votes	Pct	Opponent(s)	Votes	Pct	Ballots cast	Majority	Turnout
2018	P011 Pendang	Awang Hashim (PAS)	26,536	42.63%	Othman Abdul (UMNO)	20,728	33.30%	63,371	5,808	84.64%
2018	P011 Pendang	Awang Hashim (PAS)	26,536	42.63%	Wan Saiful Wan Jan (BERSATU)	14,901	23.94%	63,371	5,808	84.64%
2018	P011 Pendang	Awang Hashim (PAS)	26,536	42.63%	Abdul Malik Manaf (IND)	81	0.13%	63,371	5,808	84.64%
2022	P011 Pendang	Awang Hashim (PAS)	49,008	64.83%	Suraya Yaacob (UMNO)	17,719	23.44%	75,594	31,289	79.95%
2022	P011 Pendang	Awang Hashim (PAS)	49,008	64.83%	Zulkifly Mohamad (PKR)	8,058	10.66%	75,594	31,289	79.95%
2022	P011 Pendang	Awang Hashim (PAS)	49,008	64.83%	Abdul Rashid Yub (PEJUANG)	809	1.07%	75,594	31,289	79.95%

== Honours ==
=== Honours of Malaysia ===
- Malaysia
  - Recipient of the 17th Yang di-Pertuan Agong Installation Medal (2024)
- Federal Territory (Malaysia)
  - Commander of the Order of the Territorial Crown (PMW) – Datuk (2021)
