= Anak Bukit (state constituency) =

Anak Bukit (N15)
Kedah constituency

State constituency
- Legislature: Kedah State Legislative Assembly
MLA
Rashidi Razak
PN
- Constituency created: 1974
- Constituency abolished: 1986
- Constituency re-created: 1994
- First contested: 1974
- Last contested: 2023

Demographics
- Population (2020): 44,466
- Electors (2023): 36,491

Anak Bukit is a state constituency in Kedah, Malaysia, that has been represented in the Kedah State Legislative Assembly.

== Demographics ==
As of 2020, Anak Bukit has a population of 44,466 people.

Ethnic breakdown of Anak Bukit's electorate as of 2023
1. Malay (88.8%)
2. Chinese (9.43%)
3. Indian (1.29%)
4. Other ethnicities (0.56%)

== History ==
=== Polling districts ===
According to the gazette issued on 30 March 2018, the Anak Bukit constituency has a total of 18 polling districts.

| State constituency | Polling districts | Code | Location |
|---|---|---|---|
| Anak Bukit (N15） | Titi Gajah | 010/15/01 | SK Titi Gajah |
| Anak Bukit (N15） | Alor Ganu | 010/15/02 | SK Titi Gajah |
| Anak Bukit (N15） | Alor Madi | 010/15/03 | SJK (T) Thiruvalluvar |
| Anak Bukit (N15） | Kota Rentang | 010/15/04 | SK Kota Rentang |
| Anak Bukit (N15） | Permatang Kong | 010/15/05 | GIATMARA Jerlun |
| Anak Bukit (N15） | Kubang Raja | 010/15/06 | SK Simpang Tiga |
| Anak Bukit (N15） | Padang Hang | 010/05/07 | SK Simpang Tiga |
| Anak Bukit (N15） | Padang Lalang | 010/05/08 | SMK Alor Janggus |
| Anak Bukit (N15） | Gunong | 010/05/09 | SMK Seri Gunong |
| Anak Bukit (N15） | Kubang Tedoh | 010/05/10 | SJK (C) Yih Choon |
| Anak Bukit (N15） | Taman Aman | 010/05/11 | SK Taman Aman |
| Anak Bukit (N15） | Pekan Anak Bukit | 010/15/12 | SJK (C) Soon Jian |
| Anak Bukit (N15） | Kampung Anak Bukit | 010/16/13 | SJK (C) Soon Jian |
| Anak Bukit (N15） | Pantai Johor | 010/16/14 | SMK Tuanku Abdul Malik |
| Anak Bukit (N15） | Chegar | 010/16/15 | SK Gunong |
| Anak Bukit (N15） | Alor Melintang | 010/16/16 | SK Sri Gunong |
| Anak Bukit (N15） | Sungai Baru | 010/16/17 | SK Sungai Baru |
| Anak Bukit (N15） | Mergong | 010/16/18 | SMA Kedah |

=== Representation history ===
Members of the Legislative Assembly for Anak Bukit
| Parliament | No | Years | Member | Party |
Constituency created from Kota Star Barat
| 4th | N07 | 1974–1978 | Wahab Sulaiman | BN (PAS) |
| 5th | N07 | 1978–1982 | Wahab Sulaiman | PAS |
| 6th | N07 | 1982–1986 | Karia @ Zakaria Said | BN (UMNO) |
Constituency spli into Alor Merah, Langgar and Alor Janggus
Constituency created from Alor Janggus, Alor Merah and Langgar
| 9th | N15 | 1995–1999 | Abdullah Hasnan Kamaruddin | BN (UMNO) |
| 10th | N15 | 1999–2002 | Fadzil Noor | BA (PAS) |
| 10th | N15 | 2002–2004 | Amiruddin Hamzah | BA (PAS) |
| 11th | N15 | 2004–2008 | Amiruddin Hamzah | PAS |
| 12th | N15 | 2008–2013 | Amiruddin Hamzah | PR (PAS) |
| 13th | N15 | 2013–2015 | Amiruddin Hamzah | PR (PAS) |
| 13th | N15 | 2015–2016 | Amiruddin Hamzah | PAS |
| 13th | N15 | 2016–2017 | Amiruddin Hamzah | GS (PAS) |
| 13th | N15 | 2017–2018 | Amiruddin Hamzah | BERSATU |
| 14th | N15 | 2018–2020 | Amiruddin Hamzah | PH (BERSATU) |
| 14th | N15 | 2020–2023 | Amiruddin Hamzah | PEJUANG |
| 15th | N15 | 2023–present | Rashidi Razak | PN (PAS) |

== Election results ==
Kedah state election, 2023
| Party | Candidate | Votes | % | ∆% |
|---|---|---|---|---|
| PN | Rashidi Razak | 21,738 | 78.63 | ▲78.63 |
| BN | Nor Hasita Md. Isa | 5,907 | 21.37 | ▼1.00 |
| Total valid votes | | 27,645 | 100.00 | |
| Total rejected ballots | | 140 | | |
| Unreturned ballots | | 37 | | |
| Turnout | | 27,822 | 76.24 | ▼6.06 |
| Registered electors | | 36,491 | | |
| Majority | | 15,831 | 57.26 | ▲50.47 |
| PN gain from PKR | | Swing | | ? |

Kedah state election, 2018
| Party | Candidate | Votes | % | ∆% |
|---|---|---|---|---|
| PKR | Amiruddin Hamzah | 9,810 | 42.21 | ▲42.21 |
| PAS | Hamdi Ishak | 8,231 | 35.42 | ▼20.04 |
| BN | Johari Aziz | 5,200 | 22.37 | ▼21.83 |
| Total valid votes | | 23,241 | 100.00 | |
| Total rejected ballots | | 297 | | |
| Unreturned ballots | | 0 | | |
| Turnout | | 23,241 | 82.30 | ▼5.00 |
| Registered electors | | 28,223 | | |
| Majority | | 1,579 | 6.79 | ▼4.47 |
| PKR gain from PAS | | Swing | | ? |

Kedah state election, 2013
| Party | Candidate | Votes | % | ∆% |
|---|---|---|---|---|
| PAS | Amiruddin Hamzah | 13,822 | 55.46 | ▼3.52 |
| BN | Hashim Jahaya | 11,016 | 44.20 | ▲3.18 |
| Independent | Abd Samat Che Noh | 85 | 0.34 | ▲0.34 |
| Total valid votes | | 24,923 | 100.00 | |
| Total rejected ballots | | 291 | | |
| Unreturned ballots | | 72 | | |
| Turnout | | 25,286 | 87.30 | ▲3.74 |
| Registered electors | | 28,981 | | |
| Majority | | 2,806 | 11.26 | ▼6.70 |
| PAS hold | | Swing | | |

Kedah state election, 2008
| Party | Candidate | Votes | % | ∆% |
|---|---|---|---|---|
| PAS | Amiruddin Hamzah | 12,493 | 58.98 | ▲8.74 |
| BN | Harisfadzilah Hussain | 8,687 | 41.02 | ▼8.74 |
| Total valid votes | | 21,180 | 100.00 | |
| Total rejected ballots | | 697 | | |
| Unreturned ballots | | 0 | | |
| Turnout | | 21,877 | 83.56 | ▼0.61 |
| Registered electors | | 26,213 | | |
| Majority | | 3,806 | 17.96 | ▲17.48 |
| PAS hold | | Swing | | |

Kedah state election, 2004
| Party | Candidate | Votes | % | ∆% |
|---|---|---|---|---|
| PAS | Amiruddin Hamzah | 10,240 | 50.24 | ▼1.34 |
| BN | Abdul Muthalib Harun | 10,144 | 49.76 | ▲1.34 |
| Total valid votes | | 20,384 | 100.00 | |
| Total rejected ballots | | 219 | | |
| Unreturned ballots | | 38 | | |
| Turnout | | 20,641 | 84.17 | ▲0.56 |
| Registered electors | | 24,523 | | |
| Majority | | 96 | 0.48 | ▼2.18 |
| PAS hold | | Swing | | |

Kedah state by-election, 18 July 2002 Upon the death of incumbent, Fadzil Noor
| Party | Candidate | Votes | % | ∆% |
|---|---|---|---|---|
| PAS | Amiruddin Hamzah | 8,298 | 51.58 | ▼4.50 |
| BN | Basorri A. Hassan | 7,790 | 48.92 | ▲4.50 |
| Total valid votes | | 16,088 | 100.00 | |
| Total rejected ballots | | 127 | | |
| Unreturned ballots | | 0 | | |
| Turnout | | 16,220 | 83.61 | ▲5.72 |
| Registered electors | | 19,399 | | |
| Majority | | 508 | 2.66 | ▼9.50 |
| PAS hold | | Swing | | |

Kedah state election, 1999
| Party | Candidate | Votes | % | ∆% |
|---|---|---|---|---|
| PAS | Fadzil Noor | 8,480 | 56.08 | ▲8.18 |
| BN | Abdullah Hasnan Kamaruddin | 6,640 | 43.92 | ▼8.18 |
| Total valid votes | | 15,120 | 100.00 | |
| Total rejected ballots | | 230 | | |
| Unreturned ballots | | 13 | | |
| Turnout | | 15,363 | 77.89 | ▲2.57 |
| Registered electors | | 19,723 | | |
| Majority | | 1,840 | 12.16 | ▲7.96 |
| PAS gain from BN | | Swing | | ? |

Kedah state election, 1995
| Party | Candidate | Votes | % | ∆% |
|---|---|---|---|---|
| BN | Abdullah Hasnan Kamaruddin | 7,044 | 52.10 | ▼3.64 |
| PAS | Abul Rahamn Bin Lim @ Halim | 6,476 | 47.90 | ▲3.64 |
| Total valid votes | | 13,520 | 100.00 | |
| Total rejected ballots | | 197 | | |
| Unreturned ballots | | 64 | | |
| Turnout | | 13,781 | 75.32 | ▼2.14 |
| Registered electors | | 19,723 | | |
| Majority | | 568 | 4.20 | ▼7.28 |
| BN hold | | Swing | | |

Kedah state election, 1982
| Party | Candidate | Votes | % | ∆% |
|---|---|---|---|---|
| BN | Karia @ Zakaria Said | 9,137 | 55.74 | ▲10.00 |
| PAS | Wahab Sulaiman | 7,254 | 44.26 | ▼10.00 |
| Total valid votes | | 16,391 | 100.00 | |
| Total rejected ballots | | 261 | | |
| Unreturned ballots | | 0 | | |
| Turnout | | 16,652 | 77.46 | ▲0.83 |
| Registered electors | | 21,496 | | |
| Majority | | 1,883 | 11.48 | ▲2.96 |
| BN gain from PAS | | Swing | | ? |

Kedah state election, 1978
| Party | Candidate | Votes | % | ∆% |
|---|---|---|---|---|
| PAS | Wahab Sulaiman | 7,474 | 54.26 | ▲54.26 |
| BN | Ismail Md. Noor | 6,300 | 45.74 | ▼28.06 |
| Total valid votes | | 13,774 | 100.00 | |
| Total rejected ballots | | 663 | | |
| Unreturned ballots | | 0 | | |
| Turnout | | 14,437 | 76.63 | ▲8.23 |
| Registered electors | | 18,841 | | |
| Majority | | 1,174 | 8.52 | ▼48.73 |
| PAS gain from BN | | Swing | | ? |

Kedah state election, 1974
| Party | Candidate | Votes | % |
|---|---|---|---|
| BN | Wahab Sulaiman | 7,995 | 73.80 |
| Independent | Yahya Darus | 1,793 | 16.55 |
| Parti Sosialis Rakyat Malaysia | Hamid Talib | 1,045 | 9.65 |
| Total valid votes | | 10,833 | 100.00 |
| Total rejected ballots | | 748 | |
| Unreturned ballots | | 0 | |
| Turnout | | 11,581 | 68.40 |
| Registered electors | | 16,924 | |
| Majority | | 6,202 | 57.25 |
This was a new constituency created.
