= Derga =

Political subdivision in Malaysia

Derga (N11)
Kedah constituency

State constituency
- Legislature: Kedah State Legislative Assembly
MLA
Muhamad Amri Wahab
PN
- Constituency created: 1984
- First contested: 1986
- Last contested: 2023

Demographics
- Electors (2023): 37,738

Derga is a state constituency in Kedah, Malaysia, that is represented in the Kedah State Legislative Assembly.

== Demographics ==
As of 2020, Derga has a population of 44,085 people.

Ethnic breakdown of Derga's electorate as of 2023
1. Malay (61.3%)
2. Chinese (33.0%)
3. Indian (4.56%)
4. Other ethnicities (1.22%)

== History ==
=== Polling districts ===
According to the gazette issued on 30 March 2018, the Derga constituency has a total of 14 polling districts.

State constituency	Polling districts	Code	Location
Derga（N11）	Taman Pknk	008/11/01	SK Taman Rakyat
Derga（N11）	Alor Malai	008/11/02	MADA Rice Training Centre (MRTC)
Derga（N11）	Kampung Telok Sena	008/11/03	Kolej Vokasional Alor Setar
Derga（N11）	Jalan Stadium	008/11/04	SK Tunku Abdul Halim
Derga（N11）	Sentosa	008/11/05	SMK Sultanah Asma
Derga（N11）	Jalan Ambar	008/11/06	SMK Sultanah Asma
Derga（N11）	Derga	008/11/07	SK Tunku Raudzah
Derga（N11）	Jalan Sheriff	008/11/08	SJK (C) Kee Chee
Derga（N11）	Alor Segamat	008/11/09	SMK Sultanah Asma
Derga（N11）	Taman Mewah	008/11/10	SMK Tunku Sofiah
Derga（N11）	Taman Nuri	008/11/11	SK Convent
Derga（N11）	Taman Intan	008/11/12	SK Jalan Datuk Kumbar
Derga（N11）	Tanjung Seri	008/11/13	SK Alor Setar
Derga（N11）	Taman Derga Jaya	008/11/14	SR Islam Alor Setar

=== Representation history ===
Kedah State Legislative Assemblyman for Derga
Assembly	No	Years	Member	Party
Constituency created from Langgar-Limbong, Alor Merah and Pengkalan Kundor
7th	N08	1986–1990	Abdul Rahman Ibrahim	BN (UMNO)
8th	N08	1990–1995	Abdul Rahman Ibrahim	BN (UMNO)
9th	N12	1995–1999	Cheung Khai Yan (张启仁)	BN (GERAKAN)
10th	N12	1999–2004	Cheung Khai Yan (张启仁)	BN (GERAKAN)
11th	N11	2004–2008	Cheung Khai Yan (张启仁)	BN (GERAKAN)
12th	N11	2008–2013	Cheah Soon Hai (谢顺海)	BN (GERAKAN)
13th	N11	2013–2018	Tan Kok Yew (陈国耀)	PR (DAP)
14th	N11	2018–2023	Tan Kok Yew (陈国耀)	PH (DAP)
15th	N11	2023–present	Muhamad Amri Wahab	PN (BERSATU)

== Election results ==
Kedah state election, 2023: Derga
Party	Candidate	Votes	%	∆%
PN	Muhamad Amri Wahab	14,433	56.72	▲56.72
PH	Tan Kok Yew	10,771	42.33	▲42.33
Independent	Noor Azman Basharon	241	0.95	▲0.95
Total valid votes		25,445	100.00	
Total rejected ballots		115		
Unreturned ballots		42		
Turnout		25,602	67.84	▼15.47
Registered electors		37,738		
Majority		3,662	14.39	▼9.42
PN gain from PKR		Swing		?

Kedah state election, 2018: Derga
Party	Candidate	Votes	%	∆%
PKR	Tan Kok Yew	11,232	50.79	▲50.79
PAS	Yahya Saad	5,967	26.98	▲26.98
BN	Cheah Soon Hai	4,916	22.23	▼20.33
Total valid votes		22,115	100.00	
Total rejected ballots		192		
Unreturned ballots		188		
Turnout		22,495	83.31	▲0.71
Registered electors		27,849		
Majority		5,265	23.81	▲18.46
PKR hold		Swing		

Kedah state election, 2013: Derga
Party	Candidate	Votes	%	∆%
DAP	Tan Kok Yew	10,358	47.91	▲33.91
BN	Cheah Soon Hai	9,202	42.56	▼1.07
Pan-Malaysian Islamic Front	Abdul Fisol Mohd Isa	2,061	9.53	▲9.53
Total valid votes		21,621	100.00	
Total rejected ballots		332		
Unreturned ballots		89		
Turnout		22,042	82.60	▲11.07
Registered electors		26,695		
Majority		1,156	5.35	▲4.28
DAP gain from BN		Swing		?

Kedah state election, 2008: Derga
Party	Candidate	Votes	%	∆%
BN	Cheah Soon Hai	6,516	43.53	▼26.35
PKR	Cheung Khai Yan	6,353	42.46	▲12.35
DAP	Teoh Teik Guan	2,095	14.00	▲14.00
Total valid votes		14,964	100.00	
Total rejected ballots		332		
Unreturned ballots		79		
Turnout		15,783	71.53	▼3.23
Registered electors		22,064		
Majority		163	1.07	▼38.71
BN hold		Swing		

Kedah state election, 2004: Derga
Party	Candidate	Votes	%	∆%
BN	Cheung Khai Yan	10,827	69.89	▼1.33
PKR	Rohani Bakar	4,665	30.11	▲30.11
Total valid votes		15,492	100.00	
Total rejected ballots		185		
Unreturned ballots		0		
Turnout		15,677	74.76	▲9.25
Registered electors		21,254		
Majority		6,162	39.78	▼2.66
BN hold		Swing		

Kedah state election, 1999: Derga
Party	Candidate	Votes	%	∆%
BN	Cheung Khai Yan	9,156	71.22	▼0.63
DAP	Liew Kard Seong	3,700	28.78	▲28.78
Total valid votes		12,856	100.00	
Total rejected ballots		418		
Unreturned ballots		143		
Turnout		13,417	65.51	▼0.18
Registered electors		20,480		
Majority		5,456	42.44	▼9.36
BN hold		Swing		

Kedah state election, 1995: Derga
Party	Candidate	Votes	%	∆%
BN	Cheung Khai Yan	9,248	71.85	▲18.52
S46	Che Jaafar Jusoh	2,580	20.05	▼25.20
PBS	Jayagopal A/L Adaikkalam	1,043	8.10	▲8.10
Total valid votes		12,871	100.00	
Total rejected ballots		231		
Unreturned ballots		231		
Turnout		13,307	65.69	▼6.06
Registered electors		20,257		
Majority		6,668	51.80	▲43.72
BN hold		Swing		

Kedah state election, 1990: Derga
Party	Candidate	Votes	%	∆%
BN	Abdul Rahman Ibrahim	7,673	53.33	▲9.38
S46	Basharon Hanafiah	6,511	45.25	▲45.25
Independent	Jayagopal A/L Adaikkalam	205	1.42	▲1.42
Total valid votes		14,389	100.00	
Total rejected ballots		430		
Unreturned ballots		0		
Turnout		14,819	71.75	▲2.58
Registered electors		20,654		
Majority		1,162	8.08	▼7.12
BN hold		Swing		

Kedah state election, 1986: Derga
Party	Candidate	Votes	%
BN	Abdul Rahman Ibrahim	5,752	43.98
DAP	Ngooi Ah Fart	3,764	28.78
PAS	Mohd Shauki Hj Ibrahim	3,562	27.24
Total valid votes		13,078	100.00
Total rejected ballots		387	
Unreturned ballots		0	
Turnout		13,475	69.17
Registered electors		19,481	
Majority		1,998	15.20
This was a new constituency created.
