= Tokai (state constituency) =

Tokai (N18)
Kedah constituency

State constituency
- Legislature: Kedah State Legislative Assembly
MLA
Mohd Hayati Othman
PN
- Constituency created: 2003
- First contested: 2004
- Last contested: 2023

Demographics
- Electors (2023): 45,374

Tokai is a state constituency in Kedah, Malaysia, that has been represented in the Kedah State Legislative Assembly.

== Demographics ==
As of 2020, Tokai has a population of 43,566 people.

Ethnic breakdown of Tokai's electorate as of 2023
1. Malay (91.6%)
2. Chinese (7.69%)
3. Other ethnicities (0.47%)
4. Indian (0.24%)

== History ==
=== Polling districts ===
According to the gazette issued on 30 March 2018, the Tokai constituency has a total of 21 polling districts.

State constituency	Polling districts	Code	Location
Tokai (N18）	Sri Pudak	011/18/01	SK Tanah Merah
Tokai (N18）	Kepala Bukit	011/18/02	SK Penghulu Jusoh
Tokai (N18）	Kampung Penyarom	011/18/03	Maktab Mahmud Pendang
Tokai (N18）	Tanah Merah	011/18/04	SK Tanah Merah
Tokai (N18）	Kampung Rambai	011/18/05	SK Kg Rambai
Tokai (N18）	Kubang Jelai	011/18/06	SK Haji Abdul Rahman
Tokai (N18）	Pekan Tokai	011/18/07	SMK Tokai
Tokai (N18）	Kampung Pulai	011/18/08	SK Kampung Pulai Tokai
Tokai (N18）	Alor Besar	011/18/09	SK Alor Besar
Tokai (N18）	Kobah	011/18/10	SK Bukit Choras
Tokai (N18）	Tempoyak	011/18/11	SMK Pendang
Tokai (N18）	Sebrang Pendang	011/18/12	SR Islam Islah
Tokai (N18）	Pekan Pendang	011/18/13	SJK (C) Yeang Cheng
Tokai (N18）	Bukit Raya	011/18/14	SK Bukit Raya Dalam
Tokai (N18）	Banggol Besi	011/18/15	SMK Tanah Merah
Tokai (N18）	Guar Kepayang	011/18/16	SK Guar Kepayang
Tokai (N18）	Cherok Kudong	011/18/17	SK Cherok Kudong
Tokai (N18）	Gajah Mati	011/18/18	SK Kampung Chegar
Tokai (N18）	Manggol Petai	011/18/19	SMK Tuanku Temenggung
Tokai (N18）	Paya Kelubi	011/18/20	SK Pendang
Tokai (N18）	Batu Manunggul	011/18/21	SK Ayer Puteh

=== Representation history ===
Kedah State Legislative Assemblyman for Tokai
Assembly	No	Years	Member	Party
Constituency renamed from Bukit Raya
11th	N18	2004–2008	Mohamed Taulan Mat Rasul	PAS
12th	N18	2008–2013	Mohamed Taulan Mat Rasul	PR (PAS)
13th	N18	2013–2018	Mohamed Taulan Mat Rasul	PR (PAS)
14th	N18	2018–2020	Mohd Hayati Othman	GS (PAS)
14th	N18	2020–2023	Mohd Hayati Othman	PN (PAS)
15th	N18	2023–present	Mohd Hayati Othman	PN (PAS)

== Election results ==
Kedah state election, 2023
Party	Candidate	Votes	%	∆%
PN	Mohd Hayati Othman	29,329	84.43	▲84.43
PH	Zainul Abidin Saad	5,410	15.57	▼6.40
Total valid votes		34,739	100.00	
Total rejected ballots		160		
Unreturned ballots		37		
Turnout		34,936	77.00	▼8.19
Registered electors		45,374		
Majority		23,919	68.86	▲42.44
PN hold		Swing		

Kedah state election, 2018
Party	Candidate	Votes	%	∆%
PAS	Mohd Hayati Othman	15,941	52.33	▼6.22
BN	Ahmad Fatahi Omar	7,892	25.91	▼13.67
PKR	Mohd Firdaus Jaafar	6,632	21.97	▲21.97
Total valid votes		30,465	100.00	
Total rejected ballots		332		
Unreturned ballots		0		
Turnout		30,895	85.19	▼3.61
Registered electors		36,266		
Majority		8,049	26.42	▲7.45
PAS hold		Swing		

Kedah state election, 2013
Party	Candidate	Votes	%	∆%
PAS	Mohamed Taulan Mat Rasul	18,005	58.55	▲2.47
BN	Najmuddin Darus	12,172	39.58	▼2.91
Independent	Abu Bakar Abdullah	136	0.44	▲0.44
Total valid votes		30,677	100.00	
Total rejected ballots		364		
Unreturned ballots		74		
Turnout		30,751	88.80	▲5.12
Registered electors		34,623		
Majority		5,833	18.97	▲6.81
PAS hold		Swing		

Kedah state election, 2008
Party	Candidate	Votes	%	∆%
PAS	Mohamed Taulan Mat Rasul	13,871	56.08	▲2.15
BN	Fatimah Ismail	10,865	43.92	▼2.15
Total valid votes		24,736	100.00	
Total rejected ballots		560		
Unreturned ballots		0		
Turnout		25,296	83.68	▼3.97
Registered electors		30,229		
Majority		3,006	12.16	▼4.30
PAS hold		Swing		

Kedah state election, 2004
Party	Candidate	Votes	%
PAS	Mohamed Taulan Mat Rasul	14,790	58.23
BN	Shamsuddin Tahir	10,611	41.77
Total valid votes		25,401	100.00
Total rejected ballots		222	
Unreturned ballots		19	
Turnout		25,642	87.65
Registered electors		29,254	
Majority		4,179	16.46
This was a new constituency created.
