= Sungai Tiang =

State constituency in Kedah, Malaysia

Sungai Tiang (N19)
Kedah constituency

State constituency
- Legislature: Kedah State Legislative Assembly
MLA
Abdul Razak Khamis
PN
- Constituency created: 1994
- First contested: 1995
- Last contested: 2023

Demographics
- Electors (2023): 49,414

Sungai Tiang is a state constituency in Kedah, Malaysia, that has been represented in the Kedah State Legislative Assembly.

== Demographics ==
As of 2020, Sungai Tiang has a population of 55,797 people.

Ethnic breakdown of Sungai Tiang's electorate as of 2023
1. Malay (85.7%)
2. Other ethnicities (11.7%)
3. Chinese (1.91%)
4. Indian (0.72%)

== History ==
=== Polling districts ===
According to the gazette issued on 30 March 2018, the Sungai Tiang constituency has a total of 23 polling districts.

State constituency	Polling districts	Code	Location
Sungai Tiang (N19)	Kubor Panjang	011/19/01	SK Kubor Panjang
Sungai Tiang (N19)	Kampung Perupok	011/19/02	SK Bendang Raja
Sungai Tiang (N19)	Kampung China	011/19/03	Dewan Pendidikan Agama Buddha Watt Siam Kampung China
Sungai Tiang (N19)	Padang Durian	011/19/04	SK Padang Durian
Sungai Tiang (N19)	Pokok Assam	011/19/05	SK Pokok Assam
Sungai Tiang (N19)	Kampung Bekat	011/19/06	SMK Kubor Panjang
Sungai Tiang (N19)	Paya Rawa	011/19/07	SK Paya Rawa
Sungai Tiang (N19)	Kampung Bechah	011/19/08	SK Syed Ibrahim
Sungai Tiang (N19)	Titi Akat	011/19/09	Sekolah Bahasa Siam, Watt Siam Titi Akar
Sungai Tiang (N19)	Sungai Tiang Blok B	011/19/10	Pusat Kokurikulum Daerah Pendang (Kem Sungai Tiang)
Sungai Tiang (N19)	Sungai Tiang Blok A	011/19/11	SK Sungai Tiang
Sungai Tiang (N19)	Kampung Mahawangsa Pendang	011/19/12	SK Sungai Siput
Sungai Tiang (N19)	Kampung Bahru	011/19/13	SK Kampong Baru
Sungai Tiang (N19)	Sawa Kechil	011/19/14	Ma'had Al-Imam As-Syafie, Sawa Kechil
Sungai Tiang (N19)	Padang Pusing	011/19/15	SMK Syed Ibrahim Padang Pusing
Sungai Tiang (N19)	Ayer Puteh	011/19/16	SK Hj Mohamad Ariff
Sungai Tiang (N19)	Bukit Jambol	011/19/17	SK Bukit Jambul
Sungai Tiang (N19)	Junun	011/19/18	SK Bukit Jenun
Sungai Tiang (N19)	Tanjong Setol	011/19/19	Sekolah Model Khas Bukit Jenun
Sungai Tiang (N19)	Bukit Genting	011/19/20	SK Bukit Genting
Sungai Tiang (N19)	Pokok Tai	011/19/21	SK Pokok Tai
Sungai Tiang (N19)	Paya Mak Inson	011/19/22	SK Paya Mak Insun
Sungai Tiang (N19)	Paya Mengkuang	011/19/23	SK Paya Mengkuang

=== Representation history ===
Kedah State Legislative Assemblyman for Sungai Tiang
Assembly	No	Years	Member	Party
Constituency created from Ayer Puteh and Bukit Raya
9th	N19	1995–1999	Fatimah Ismail	BN (UMNO)
10th	N19	1999–2004	Md Rozai Shafian	BN (UMNO)
11th	N19	2004–2008	Suraya Yaacob	BN (UMNO)
12th	N19	2008–2013	Suraya Yaacob	BN (UMNO)
13th	N19	2013–2018	Suraya Yaacob	BN (UMNO)
14th	N19	2018–2023	Suraya Yaacob	BN (UMNO)
15th	N19	2023–2026	Abdul Razak Khamis	PN (BERSATU)
15th	N19	2026	Abdul Razak Khamis	Independent
15th	N19	2026–present	Abdul Razak Khamis	PN (WAWASAN)

== Election results ==
Kedah state election, 2023: Sungai Tiang
Party	Candidate	Votes	%	∆%
PN	Abdul Razak Khamis	27,154	72.98	▲72.98
BN	Mohamad Fadzil Zolkipli	10,055	27.02	▼11.32
Total valid votes		37,209	100.00	
Total rejected ballots		213		
Unreturned ballots		27		
Turnout		37,449	75.79	▼8.35
Registered electors		49,414		
Majority		17,099	45.96	▲43.95
PN gain from BN		Swing		?

Kedah state election, 2018: Sungai Tiang
Party	Candidate	Votes	%	∆%
BN	Suraya Yaacob	12,213	38.39	▼22.29
PAS	Saiful Syazwan Shafie	11,572	36.38	▼1.88
PKR	Abdul Razak Khamis	8,028	25.23	▲25.23
Total valid votes		31,813	100.00	
Total rejected ballots		582		
Unreturned ballots		0		
Turnout		32,395	84.14	▼5.46
Registered electors		38,501		
Majority		641	2.01	▼20.41
BN hold		Swing		

Kedah state election, 2013: Sungai Tiang
Party	Candidate	Votes	%	∆%
BN	Suraya Yaacob	18,929	60.68	▲4.60
PAS	Fadzil Baharum	11,935	38.26	▼5.66
Independent	Rosli Omar	192	0.62	▲0.62
KITA	Charean A/L Isen	139	0.45	▲0.45
Total valid votes		31,195	100.00	
Total rejected ballots		577		
Unreturned ballots		55		
Turnout		31,827	89.60	▲5.92
Registered electors		35,512		
Majority		6,994	22.42	▲10.26
BN hold		Swing		

Kedah state election, 2008: Sungai Tiang
Party	Candidate	Votes	%	∆%
BN	Suraya Yaacob	13,871	56.08	▼2.91
PAS	Ab Muthalib Awang	10,865	43.92	▲2.91
Total valid votes		24,736	100.00	
Total rejected ballots		560		
Unreturned ballots		0		
Turnout		25,296	83.68	▼2.56
Registered electors		30,229		
Majority		3,006	12.16	▼5.81
BN hold		Swing		

Kedah state election, 2004: Sungai Tiang
Party	Candidate	Votes	%	∆%
BN	Suraya Yaacob	13,948	58.99	▲2.52
PAS	Ab Muthalib Awang	9,698	41.02	▼2.52
Total valid votes		23,646	100.00	
Total rejected ballots		385		
Unreturned ballots		53		
Turnout		24,084	86.24	▼6.25
Registered electors		27,926		
Majority		4,250	17.97	▲5.03
BN hold		Swing		

Kedah state election, 1999: Sungai Tiang
Party	Candidate	Votes	%	∆%
BN	Md Rozai Shafian	11,039	56.47	▼3.65
PAS	Haji Abdullah Haji Abdul Rahman	8,509	43.53	▲3.65
Total valid votes		19,548	100.00	
Total rejected ballots		650		
Unreturned ballots		3,723		
Turnout		23,921	92.49	▲16.68
Registered electors		25,863		
Majority		2,520	12.94	▼7.20
BN hold		Swing		

Kedah state election, 1995: Sungai Tiang
Party	Candidate	Votes	%
BN	Fatimah Ismail	11,168	60.12
PAS	Rahman @ Haji Abdullah Rahim Haji Abdul Rahman	7,409	39.98
Total valid votes		18,577	100.00
Total rejected ballots		512	
Unreturned ballots		9	
Turnout		19,098	75.81
Registered electors		25,192	
Majority		3,759	20.14
This was a new constituency created.
