= Fadzil Noor =

Malaysian politician

Yang Berbahagia Dato' Ustaz Fadzil Muhammad Noor DSDK
- فاضل محمد نور

7th Leader of the Opposition
- In office 29 November 1999 – 23 June 2002
- Monarchs: Jaafar; Salahuddin; Sirajuddin
- Prime Minister: Mahathir Mohamad
- Preceded by: Lim Kit Siang
- Succeeded by: Abdul Hadi Awang

6th President of the Malaysian Islamic Party
- In office 1989 – 23 June 2002
- Preceded by: Yusof Rawa
- Succeeded by: Abdul Hadi Awang

Personal details
- Born: Ali @ Fadzil bin Muhammad Noor; 15 March 1937 Kampung Seberang Pumpung, Alor Setar, Kedah
- Died: 23 June 2002 (aged 65) Hospital Universiti Kebangsaan Malaysia, Bandar Tun Razak, Cheras, Kuala Lumpur
- Party: Pan-Malaysian Islamic Party (PAS)
- Other political affiliations: Angkatan Perpaduan Ummah (APU) (1990-1996); Barisan Alternatif (BA) (1999-2002)
- Spouse: Siti Khadijah Ibrahim
- Children: 8 (5 sons & 3 daughters) including Muhammad Faiz Fadzil
- Parent(s): Mohd Noor Abdul Hamid (father; deceased); Hindun Abdul Rahman (mother; deceased)
- Education: Al-Azhar University
- Profession: Religious teacher

Fadzil bin Muhammad Noor (Jawi: فاضل بن محمد نور; 15 March 1937 – 23 June 2002) was a Malaysian politician and religious teacher. He was the president of Pan-Malaysian Islamic Party (PAS) from 1989 to 2002 and Leader of the Opposition in the Parliament of Malaysia from 1999 to 2002.

Fadzil became the Deputy President of PAS in 1982, when Yusof Rawa ascended to the party's presidency. The election of Yusof and Fadzil marked a victory for the party's conservative ulama faction. Both men wanted PAS to advocate for an Islamic state in Malaysia modelled on the one that had arisen in Iran following the 1979 revolution there.

When Yusof resigned for health reasons in 1989, Fadzil became PAS's President. He set PAS on a more moderate path, diverting from the hardline Islamism of Yusof's presidency. This involved reorienting the party's platform away from the propagation of religious doctrine towards a greater focus on social and economic issues such as poverty alleviation. This approach brought greater electoral success for the party. PAS captured the state of Kelantan at the 1990 election and Terengganu in 1999. His presidency saw the formation of the Barisan Alternatif coalition between PAS, the Democratic Action Party and Keadilan, which made large gains in the 1999 election. In the face of criticism from the party's conservatives, he justified cooperation with non-Muslim opposition parties by arguing that PAS's 'struggle for justice' was 'not only for the Malays, not only for the Muslims, but for all Malaysians'.

Fadzil also set about infusing the party's youth ranks with urban professionals, such as Hatta Ramli, Dzulkefly Ahmad and Nasharudin Mat Isa, to diversify the party's future leadership beyond religious clerics.

Fadzil died on 23 June 2002 after undergoing heart bypass surgery. He was succeeded as PAS President and leader of the opposition in Parliament by Abdul Hadi Awang.

He was an alumnus of Al-Azhar University in Cairo, Egypt.

== Early life and education ==
Fadzil was born in Kampung Seberang Pumpung, Alor Setar, Kedah. He is the eldest of four siblings. His father's name was Mohd Noor Abdul Hamid and his mother's name was Hindun Haji Abdul Rahman.

His great-grandfather, Tuan Guru Haji Idris Al-Jarumi was a respected scholar who hailed from Pattani, Thailand.

He received his early education at the Derga Malay School (1945-1950) in Derga, Alor Setar and Maktab Mahmud (1951-1959) before furthering his studies at Al Azhar University, Egypt (1962-1967) majoring in Islamic law from. His higher-education was sponsored by the Kedah state government. In 1967, during his time in Egypt, he held the position of Secretary and Deputy President of the Malay Association in the Arab Republic of Egypt (PMRAM). PMRAM is the oldest association in the Middle East, it was officially established since 1930. The only Malaysian association in Egypt at that time, even before the government Malaysian embassy established in Cairo in late 60s.

== Educational career ==
Upon returning from Egypt he taught at Maktab Mahmud and later as a lecturer at Universiti Teknologi Malaysia (UTM) (1973-1978). He was fired from UTM for contesting in the 1978 Malaysian general election as a candidate for the Pan-Malaysian Islamic Party (PAS). He brought the case to court as the dismissal did not follow the correct channels. The court ordered UTM to pay damages and to reinstate Fadzil as a lecturer. Fadzil later resigned as a lecturer to pursue political activities full-time.

== ABIM President ==
Ustaz Fadzil Noor had been the Information Secretary of the Angkatan Belia Islam Malaysia (ABIM) (1973-1974) and ABIM Deputy President (1974-1978) and Secretary of the Malaysian Ulama Association (PUM) (1974-1976). ABIM actively spread books and writings of the Muslim Brotherhood such as Hassan al Banna, Syed Qutb and Jamiat Islami, Maududi. Some PUM leaders have also been prominent members of PAS including Ustaz Ahmad Awang and Ustaz Abdul Ghani Shamsuddin.

Fadzil Noor was appointed as President of ABIM when Anwar Ibrahim was arrested under the Internal Security Act 1960 in 1974 following the Baling Demonstrations caused by a famine in Baling.

== Political career ==
Fadzil's political career began in 1978 when he stood as the PAS candidate against Datuk Senu Abdul Rahman for the Kuala Kedah parliamentary seat. However, he was unable to defeat the incumbent. In the same election, PAS was defeated in Kelantan, which it had ruled since 1959 by the Barisan Nasional (BN) coalition who formed the federal government. He became the PAS President of the Kuala Kedah area and the Kedah PAS State Liaison Member. In 1981, he was elected as Vice President of PAS and served in the position until 1982. After that, he started his parliamentary political career as MLA of Bukit Raya in 1982, defeating BN candidate Syeikh Alias Mustafa and an independent candidate. A year later in 1983, Fadzil and Yusof Rawa were elected as Deputy President and President respectively. Their election signified a take-over by the party's conservative ulama faction who advocated for the establishment of an Islamic state. On March 30, 1989 he was elected as President of PAS after the retirement of Rawa. His presidency saw a moderation of the party's rhetoric whilst remaining committed to the establishment of an Islamic state. In the 1990 Malaysian general election Fadzil led the party into an informal alliance with the UMNO-breakaway group Semangat 46 and other Islamic parties called Angkatan Perpaduan Ummah (APU). PAS was able to win an additional 6 seats in parliament and the APU won all of the 39 state legislate assembly seats in Kelantan.

In 1998, he was appointed as Chairman of Gerakan Keadilan Rakyat Malaysia. The organisation was set up by PAS, the Democratic Action Party (DAP), and the Malaysian People's Party (PRM). The organisation included 15 non-governmental organizations and various individuals and sought to uphold justice after the sacking of Datuk Seri Anwar Ibrahim as Deputy Prime Minister and his detention without trial under the ISA the same year by Prime Minister Mahathir Mohamad.

In the 1999 Malaysian general election Fadzil stood as a candidate for the Anak Bukit state assembly seat as well as a candidate for the Pendang parliamentary seat. He was able to win both seats. Fadzil's victory coincided with PAS' biggest electoral victory in history, where they were able to win an additional 20 seats and re-take the state of Terrenganu whilst contesting together with the DAP, PRM and the newly-formed Parti KeADILan Nasional (now Parti Keadilan Rakyat) as part of the Barisan Alternatif coalition. In 1999 he was appointed Leader of the Opposition (Malaysia) in the Dewan Rakyat succeeding Lim Kit Siang as PAS had become the largest opposition party in parliament.

== Death ==
Fadzil died as a result of complications following a heart bypass surgery 23 June 2002. He was survived by a wife and eight children.

== Election results ==
Parliament of Malaysia
| Year | Constituency | Candidate | Votes | Pct | Opponent(s) | Votes | Pct | Ballots cast | Majority | Turnout |
|---|---|---|---|---|---|---|---|---|---|---|
| 1978 | P006 Kuala Kedah | Fadzil Noor (PAS) | 14,028 | 47.97% | Senu Abdul Rahman (UMNO) | 14,907 | 50.98% | 29,243 | 879 | |
| 1978 | P006 Kuala Kedah | Fadzil Noor (PAS) | 14,028 | 47.97% | Yaacob @ Salleh Abdullah (IND) | 337 | 1.41% | 29,243 | 879 | |
| 1982 | P009 Ulu Muda | Fadzil Noor (PAS) | 11,711 | 43.40% | Hashim Endut (UMNO) | 15,271 | 56.60% | 27,803 | 3,560 | 81.29% |
| 1986 | P008 Kuala Kedah | Fadzil Noor (PAS) | 14,035 | 46.74% | Mohammad Abu Bakar Rautin Ibrahim (UMNO) | 15,992 | 53.26% | 30,775 | 1,957 | 72.13% |
| 1990 | P009 Pendang | Fadzil Noor (PAS) | 17,349 | 45.77% | Othman Abdul (UMNO) | 20,554 | 54.23% | 38,768 | 3,205 | 82.57% |
| 1995 | P010 Kuala Kedah | Fadzil Noor (PAS) | 19,223 | 46.40% | Zakaria Mohd Said (UMNO) | 22,209 | 53.60% | 42,612 | 2,986 | 74.23% |
| 1999 | P011 Pendang | Fadzil Noor (PAS) | 22,413 | 53.51% | Othman Abdul (UMNO) | 19,474 | 46.49% | 43,292 | 2,939 | 81.08% |

Kedah State Legislative Assembly
| Year | Constituency | Candidate | Votes | Pct | Opponent(s) | Votes | Pct | Ballots cast | Majority | Turnout |
|---|---|---|---|---|---|---|---|---|---|---|
| 1980 | N12 Bukit Raya | Fadzil Noor (PAS) | 6,732 | 49.47% | Safirol Hashim (UMNO) | 6,801 | 49.98% | 13,611 | 69 | 81.30% |
| 1982 | N12 Bukit Raya | Fadzil Noor (PAS) | | % | Safirol Hashim (UMNO) | | % | | 346 | % |
| 1982 | N12 Bukit Raya | Fadzil Noor (PAS) | | % | Mohd Mokhtar Abdullah (IND) | | % | | 346 | % |
| 1986 | N13 Bukit Raya | Fadzil Noor (PAS) | | % | Ahmad Zakuan Haji Ahmad (UMNO) | | % | | 2,215 | % |
| 1990 | N13 Bukit Raya | Fadzil Noor (PAS) | | % | Syed Mansor Syed Kassim Barakhbah (UMNO) | | % | | 1,829 | % |
| 1995 | N18 Bukit Raya | Fadzil Noor (PAS) | | % | Fadzil Hanafi (UMNO) | | % | | 2,414 | % |
| 1999 | N15 Anak Bukit | Fadzil Noor (PAS) | 8,480 | 56.08% | Abdullah Hasnan Kamaruddin (UMNO) | 6,640 | 43.92% | 15,350 | 1,840 | 77.83% |

== Honours ==
- Kedah
  - Knight Companion of the Order of Loyalty to the Royal House of Kedah (DSDK) – Dato' (1998)

Political offices
| Preceded by Lim Kit Siang | Leader of the Opposition of Malaysia; 1999–2002 | Succeeded by Abdul Hadi Awang |
Party political offices
| Preceded by Yusof Rawa | President of the Pan-Malaysian Islamic Party; 1989–2002 | Succeeded by Abdul Hadi Awang |
