= List of candidates in the 2018 Malaysian general election =

This is the list of candidates for the 2018 Malaysian general election. All names listed here are expected to contest in 222 parliamentary seats and 505 state seats (from 12 state legislative assemblies).

The parliamentary election deposit was set at RM 10,000 per candidate, double the state election deposit per candidate. Similar to previous elections, the election deposit will be forfeited if the particular candidate had failed to secure at least 12.5% or one-eighth of the votes.

== Contesting parties ==
24 parties are expected to contest in this election. The table below, however, lists only parties represented in the previous Dewan Rakyat.

Name		Ideology	Leader(s)	Seats contested	2013 result		Seats in 13th Dewan Rakyat
Name		Ideology	Leader(s)	Seats contested	Votes (%)	Seats	Seats in 13th Dewan Rakyat
BN	Barisan Nasional; National Front	National conservatism	Najib Razak	222	47.38%	133 / 222	130 / 222
PH	Pakatan Harapan; Alliance of Hope	Reformism / Progressivism	Mahathir Mohamad	204	36.1%	67 / 222	72 / 222
GS	Gagasan Sejahtera; Ideas of Prosperity	Islamic conservatism	Abdul Hadi Awang	158	14.78%	21 / 222	13 / 222
WARISAN	Parti Warisan Sabah; Sabah Heritage Party	Sabah regionalism	Mohd. Shafie Apdal	17	New Party	0 / 222	2 / 222
PSM	Parti Sosialis Malaysia; Socialist Party of Malaysia	Democratic socialism	Mohd. Nasir Hashim	4	0.19%	1 / 222	1 / 222
PHRS	Parti Harapan Rakyat Sabah; Sabah People's Hope Party	Sabah regionalism	Lajim Ukin	15	New Party	0 / 222	0 / 222
PCS	Parti Cinta Sabah; Love Sabah Party	Sabah regionalism	Nicholas James Guntobon	8	New Party	0 / 222	0 / 222
PRM	Parti Rakyat Malaysia; Malaysian People's Party	Left-wing nationalism	Ariffin Salimon	6	Did not contest	0 / 222	0 / 222
MUP	Parti Bersama Malaysia; Malaysian United Party	Social liberalism	Tan Gin Theam	5	New Party	0 / 222	0 / 222
STAR	Parti Solidariti Tanah Airku; Homeland Solidarity Party	Sabah regionalism	Jeffrey Kitingan	5	New Party	0 / 222	0 / 222
PPRS	Parti Perpaduan Rakyat Sabah; Sabah People's Unity Party	Sabah regionalism	Mohd Arshad Abdul Mualap	3	New Party	0 / 222	0 / 222
STAR	Parti Reformasi Negeri Sarawak; State Reform Party	Sarawak regionalism	Soo Lina	3	0.41%	0 / 222	0 / 222
PFP	Parti Barisan Pulau Pinang; Penang Front Party	Penang regionalism	Patrick Ooi	2	New Party	0 / 222	0 / 222
SAPP	Parti Maju Sabah; Sabah Progressive Party	Sabah regionalism	Yong Teck Lee	2	0.09%	0 / 222	0 / 222
Anak Negeri	Parti Kerjasama Anak Negeri; Sabah Native Co-operation Party	Sabah regionalism	Zainal Hj. Nasirudin	2	New Party	0 / 222	0 / 222
PEACE	Parti Rakyat Gabungan Jaksa Pendamai; People’s Alliance For Justice of Peace	Sarawak regionalism	Julian Petrus Jout	2	New Party	0 / 222	0 / 222
PCM	Parti Cinta Malaysia; Love Malaysia Party	Conservative nationalism	Tang Weng Chew	1	0.02%	0 / 222	0 / 222
Berjasa	Barisan Jemaah Islamiah Se-Malaysia; Pan-Malaysian Islamic Front	Islamic conservatism	Abdul Kadir bin Mamat	1	0.29%	0 / 222	0 / 222
PAP	Parti Alternatif Rakyat; People's Alternative Party	Centrism	A. David Dass	1	New Party	0 / 222	0 / 222
PBDSB	Parti Bansa Dayak Sarawak Baru; New Sarawak Native People's Party	Sarawak regionalism	Louis Jarau	1	New Party	0 / 222	0 / 222
PBK	Parti Bumi Kenyalang; Land of the Hornbill Party	Sarawak regionalism	Yu Chang Ping	1	New Party	0 / 222	0 / 222
Independents		–	–	24	–	0 / 222	2 / 222

== The contested parliamentary seats ==
A total of 222 parliamentary seats will be contested in the 14th general election.

=== Perlis (3) ===
Federal constituency		Incumbent MP	Political parties					
Federal constituency		Incumbent MP	Barisan Nasional		Pakatan Harapan		Gagasan Sejahtera	
Federal constituency		Incumbent MP	Candidate Name	Party	Candidate Name	Party	Candidate Name	Party
P.001	Padang Besar	Zahidi Zainul Abidin (BN)	Zahidi Zainul Abidin	UMNO	Izizam Ibrahim	PPBM	Mokhtar Senik	PAS
P.002	Kangar	Ir. Shaharuddin Ismail (BN)	Ramli Shariff	UMNO	Noor Amin Ahmad	PKR	Mohamad Zahid Ibrahim	PAS
P.003	Arau	Dr. Shahidan Kassim (BN)	Shahidan Kassim	UMNO	Dr. Abd. Rahman Daud	PPBM	Hashim Jasin	PAS

=== Kedah (15) ===
Federal constituency		Incumbent MP	Political parties					
Federal constituency		Incumbent MP	Barisan Nasional		Pakatan Harapan		Gagasan Sejahtera	
Federal constituency		Incumbent MP	Candidate Name	Party	Candidate Name	Party	Candidate Name	Party
P.004	Langkawi	Ir. Nawawi Ahmad (BN)	Nawawi Ahmad	UMNO	Mahathir Mohamad	PPBM	Zubir Ahmad	PAS
P.005	Jerlun	Othman Aziz (BN)	Othman Aziz	UMNO	Mukhriz Mahathir	PPBM	Abdul Ghani Ahmad	PAS
P.006	Kubang Pasu	Mohd. Johari Baharum (BN)	Mohd. Johari Baharum	UMNO	Amiruddin Hamzah	PPBM	Norhafiza Fadzil	PAS
P.007	Padang Terap	Mahdzir Khalid (BN)	Mahdzir Khalid	UMNO	Mohd Khairizal Khazali	Amanah	Mohd Azam Abd Aziz	PAS
P.008	Pokok Sena	Mahfuz Omar (PH)	Said Ali Said Rastan	UMNO	Mahfuz Omar	Amanah	Radhi Mat Din	PAS
P.009	Alor Setar	Gooi Hsiao-Leung (PH)	Yoo Wei How	MCA	Chan Ming Kai	PKR	Muhd Aminur Shafiq Mohd Abduh	PAS
P.010	Kuala Kedah	Dr. Azman Ismail (PH)	Abdullah Hasnan Kamaruddin	UMNO	Azman Ismail	PKR	Mohd Riduan Othman	PAS
P.011	Pendang	Othman Abdul (BN)	Othman Abdul	UMNO	Wan Saiful Wan Jan	PPBM	Awang Hashim	PAS
P.012	Jerai	Brig. Gen. Jamil Khir Baharom (Rtd.) (BN)	Jamil Khir Baharom	UMNO	Akhramsyah Muamar Ubaidah Sanusi	PPBM	Mohd Ismail	PAS
P.013	Sik	Mansor Abd. Rahman (BN)	Mansor Abd. Rahman	UMNO	Azli Che Uda	Amanah	Ahmad Tarmizi Sulaiman	PAS
P.014	Merbok	Ismail Daut (BN)	Tajul Urus Mat Zain	UMNO	Nor Azrina Surip	PKR	Ahmad Fauzi Ramli	PAS
P.015	Sungai Petani	Johari Abdul (PH)	Shahanim Mohd Yusof	UMNO	Johari Abdul	PKR	Shahri Long	PAS
P.016	Baling	Abdul Azeez Abdul Rahim (BN)	Abdul Azeez Abdul Rahim	UMNO	Mohd Taufik Yaacob	PPBM	Hassan Saad	PAS
P.017	Padang Serai	Surendran Nagarajan (PH)	Leong Yong Kong	MCA	Karuppaiya Muthusamy	PKR	Muhd Sobri Osman	PAS
P.018	Kulim-Bandar Baharu	Abd. Aziz Sheikh Fadzir (BN)	Abd. Aziz Sheikh Fadzir	UMNO	Saifuddin Nasution Ismail	PKR	Hassan Abdul Razak	PAS

=== Kelantan (14) ===
Federal constituency		Incumbent MP	Political parties							
Federal constituency		Incumbent MP	Barisan Nasional		Pakatan Harapan		Gagasan Sejahtera		Other parties	
Federal constituency		Incumbent MP	Candidate Name	Party	Candidate Name	Party	Candidate Name	Party	Candidate Name	Party
P.019	Tumpat	Kamarudin Jaffar (PH)	Wan Johani Wan Hussin	UMNO	Nordin Salleh	PPBM	Che Abdullah Mat Nawi	PAS	—N/a	—N/a
P.020	Pengkalan Chepa	Dr. Izani Husin (GS)	Zaluzi Sulaiman	UMNO	Mohamad Ibrahim	Amanah	Ahmad Marzuki Shaary	PAS	—N/a	—N/a
P.021	Kota Bharu	Takiyuddin Hassan (GS)	Fikhran Hamshi Mohd Fatmi	UMNO	Husam Musa	Amanah	Takiyuddin Hassan	PAS	—N/a	—N/a
P.022	Pasir Mas	Nik Mohamad Abduh Nik Abdul Aziz (GS)	Nor Asmawi Ab Rahman	UMNO	Che Ujang Che Daud	PKR	Ahmad Fadhli Shaari	PAS	Ibrahim Ali	IND
P.023	Rantau Panjang	Siti Zailah Mohd Yusoff (GS)	Abdullah Mat Yasim	UMNO	Wan Shah Jihan Wan Din	Amanah	Siti Zailah Mohd Yusoff	PAS	—N/a	—N/a
P.024	Kubang Kerian	Ahmad Baihaki Atiqullah (GS)	Muhamad Abdul Ghani	UMNO	Abdul Halim Yusof	Amanah	Tuan Ibrahim Tuan Man	PAS	—N/a	—N/a
P.025	Bachok	Ahmad Marzuki Shaary (GS)	Awang Adek Hussin	UMNO	Zulkifli Zakaria	PPBM	Nik Mohamad Abduh Nik Abdul Aziz	PAS	—N/a	—N/a
P.026	Ketereh	Annuar Musa (BN)	Annuar Musa	UMNO	Mohd Radzi Md Jidin	PPBM	Wan Ismail Wan Jusoh	PAS	—N/a	—N/a
P.027	Tanah Merah	Ikmal Hisham Abdul Aziz (BN)	Ikmal Hisham Abdul Aziz	UMNO	Mohamad Fauzi Zakaria	PKR	Johari Mat	PAS	—N/a	—N/a
P.028	Pasir Puteh	Dr. Nik Mazian Nik Mohamad (GS)	Asyraf Wajdi Dusuki	UMNO	Kamarudin Mohd. Noor	PPBM	Nik Muhd Zawawi Salleh	PAS	—N/a	—N/a
P.029	Machang	Ahmad Jazlan Yaakub (BN)	Ahmad Jazlan Yaakub	UMNO	Sazmi Miah	PPBM	Zulkifli Mamat	PAS	—N/a	—N/a
P.030	Jeli	Mustapa Mohamed (BN)	Mustapa Mohamed	UMNO	Azran Deraman	PPBM	Mohamad Hamid	PAS	—N/a	—N/a
P.031	Kuala Krai	Dr. Mohd Hatta Ramli (PH)	Ramzi Ab Rahman	UMNO	Mohd. Yazid Abdullah	Amanah	Abd Latiff Abd Rahman	PAS	—N/a	—N/a
P.032	Gua Musang	Tengku Razaleigh Hamzah (BN)	Tengku Razaleigh Hamzah	UMNO	Mohd. Nor Hussin	PPBM	Abdullah Hussein	PAS	—N/a	—N/a

=== Terengganu (8) ===
Federal constituency		Incumbent MP	Political parties					
Federal constituency		Incumbent MP	Barisan Nasional		Pakatan Harapan		Gagasan Sejahtera	
Federal constituency		Incumbent MP	Candidate Name	Party	Candidate Name	Party	Candidate Name	Party
P.033	Besut	Idris Jusoh (BN)	Idris Jusoh	UMNO	Wan Nazari Wan Jusoh	PPBM	Riduan Mohamad Nor	PAS
P.034	Setiu	Che Mohamad Zulkifly Jusoh (BN)	Mohd Jidin Shafee	UMNO	Mohd Faudzi Musa	PPBM	Shaharizukarnain Abdul Kadir	PAS
P.035	Kuala Nerus	Mohd. Khairuddin Aman Razali (GS)	Tengku Asmadi Tengku Mohamad	UMNO	Abdullah Muhamad	Amanah	Mohd. Khairuddin Aman Razali	PAS
P.036	Kuala Terengganu	Raja Kamarul Bahrin Shah Raja Ahmad (PH)	Wan Nawawi Wan Ismail	UMNO	Raja Kamarul Bahrin Shah Raja Ahmad	Amanah	Ahmad Amzad Mohamed Hashim	PAS
P.037	Marang	Abdul Hadi Awang (GS)	Mohamad Noor Endut	UMNO	Zarawi Sulong	Amanah	Abdul Hadi Awang	PAS
P.038	Hulu Terengganu	Jailani Johari (BN)	Rosol Wahid	UMNO	Razali Idris	PPBM	Muhyidin Abdul Rashid	PAS
P.039	Dungun	Wan Hassan Mohd. Ramli (GS)	Din Adam	UMNO	Abd Rahman Yusof	PKR	Wan Hassan Mohd. Ramli	PAS
P.040	Kemaman	Ahmad Shabery Cheek (BN)	Ahmad Shabery Cheek	UMNO	Mohd Huzaifah Md Suhaimi	PKR	Che Alias Hamid	PAS

=== Penang (13) ===
Federal constituency		Incumbent MP	Political parties							
Federal constituency		Incumbent MP	Barisan Nasional		Pakatan Harapan		Gagasan Sejahtera		Other parties	
Federal constituency		Incumbent MP	Candidate Name	Party	Candidate Name	Party	Candidate Name	Party	Candidate Name	Party
P.041	Kepala Batas	Reezal Merican Naina Merican (BN)	Reezal Merican Naina Merican	UMNO	Zaidi Zakaria	Amanah	Siti Mastura Muhamad	PAS	—N/a	—N/a
P.042	Tasek Gelugor	Shabudin Yahaya (BN)	Shabudin Yahaya	UMNO	Marzuki Yahya	PPBM	Rizal Hafiz Ruslan	PAS	Azman Shah	PRM
P.043	Bagan	Lim Guan Eng (PH)	Lee Beng Seng	MCA	Lim Guan Eng	DAP	Huan Cheng Guan	PCM	Tan Lay Hock	PRM
P.043	Bagan	Lim Guan Eng (PH)	Lee Beng Seng	MCA	Lim Guan Eng	DAP	Huan Cheng Guan	PCM	Koay Xing Boon	MUP
P.044	Permatang Pauh	Dr. Wan Azizah Wan Ismail (PH)	Mohd. Zaidi Mohd. Said	UMNO	Nurul Izzah Anwar	PKR	Afnan Hamimi Taib Azamudden	PAS	—N/a	—N/a
P.045	Bukit Mertajam	Steven Sim Chee Keong (PH)	Gui Guat Lye	MCA	Steven Sim Chee Keong	DAP	—N/a	—N/a	—N/a	—N/a
P.046	Batu Kawan	Kasthuriraani Patto (PH)	Jayanthi Devi Balaguru	Gerakan	Kasthuriraani Patto	DAP	Jay Kumar Balakrishnan	PAS	Tang Hiang Lye	PRM
P.046	Batu Kawan	Kasthuriraani Patto (PH)	Jayanthi Devi Balaguru	Gerakan	Kasthuriraani Patto	DAP	Jay Kumar Balakrishnan	PAS		PFP
P.047	Nibong Tebal	Dr. Mansor Othman (PH)	Shaik Hussien Mydin	UMNO	Mansor Othman	PKR	Mohd Helmi Harun	PAS	Samsuddin Yacob	PRM
P.048	Bukit Bendera	Zairil Khir Johari (PH)	Andy Yong Kim Seng	Gerakan	Wong Hon Wai	DAP	—N/a	—N/a	Tan Gim Theam	MUP
P.049	Tanjong	Ng Wei Aik (PH)	Ng Siew Lai	Gerakan	Chow Kon Yeow	DAP	—N/a	—N/a	—N/a	—N/a
P.050	Jelutong	Jeff Ooi Chuan Aun (PH)	Baljit Singh Jigiri Singh	Gerakan	Sanisvara Nethaji Rayer Rajaji	DAP	—N/a	—N/a	Tan Sim Bee	MUP
P.051	Bukit Gelugor	Ramkarpal Singh Karpal Singh (PH)	Low Joo Hiap	MCA	Ramkarpal Singh Karpal Singh	DAP	—N/a	—N/a	Lai Xue Ching	MUP
P.052	Bayan Baru	Sim Tze Tzin (PH)	Chuah Seng Guan	MCA	Sim Tze Tzin	PKR	Iszuree Ibrahim	PAS	Yim Boon Leong	MUP
P.053	Balik Pulau	Dr. Hilmi Yahaya (BN)	Hilmi Yahaya	UMNO	Muhammad Bakhtiar Wan Chik	PKR	Muhammad Imran Muhammad Saad	PAS	—N/a	—N/a

=== Perak (24) ===
Federal constituency		Incumbent MP	Political parties							
Federal constituency		Incumbent MP	Barisan Nasional		Pakatan Harapan		Gagasan Sejahtera		Other parties	
Federal constituency		Incumbent MP	Candidate Name	Party	Candidate Name	Party	Candidate Name	Party	Candidate Name	Party
P.054	Gerik	Hasbullah Osman (BN)	Hasbullah Osman	UMNO	Ibrahim Mohd. Hanafiah	PPBM	Mohd Dahlan Ismail	PAS	—N/a	—N/a
P.055	Lenggong	Dr. Shamsul Anuar Nasarah (BN)	Shamsul Anuar Nasarah	UMNO	Amirul Fairuzzeen Jamaluddin	PPBM	Muhammad Mujahid Mohammad Fadzil	PAS	—N/a	—N/a
P.056	Larut	Hamzah Zainudin (BN)	Hamzah Zainudin	UMNO	Khairil Anuar Akhiruddin	PPBM	Abu Husin Mohamad	PAS	—N/a	—N/a
P.057	Parit Buntar	Dr. Mujahid Yusof Rawa (PH)	Abdul Puhat Mat Nayan	UMNO	Mujahid Yusof Rawa	Amanah	Ahmad Azhar Sharin	PAS	—N/a	—N/a
P.058	Bagan Serai	Dr. Noor Azmi Ghazali (BN)	Noor Azmi Ghazali	UMNO	Adam Asmuni	PPBM	Rohaya Bakar	PAS	—N/a	—N/a
P.059	Bukit Gantang	Idris Ahmad (GS)	Syed Abu Hussin Hafiz Syed Abdul Fasal	UMNO	Khadri Khalid	PPBM	Idris Ahmad	PAS	—N/a	—N/a
P.060	Taiping	Nga Kor Ming (PH)	Tan Keng Liang	Gerakan	Teh Kok Lim	DAP	Ibrahim Ismail	Berjasa	—N/a	—N/a
P.061	Padang Rengas	Mohamed Nazri Abdul Aziz (BN)	Mohamed Nazri Abdul Aziz	UMNO	Ejazi Yahya	PKR	Mohd Azalan Mohamad Radzi	PAS	—N/a	—N/a
P.062	Sungai Siput	Dr. Michael Jeyakumar Devaraj (PSM)	Devamany S. Krishnasamy	MIC	Kesavan Subramaniam	PKR	Ishak Ibrahim	PAS	Michael Jeyakumar Devaraj	PSM
P.063	Tambun	Ahmad Husni Hanadzlah (BN)	Ahmad Husni Hanadzlah	UMNO	Ahmad Faizal Azumu	PPBM	Ibrahim Mohamad Zakaria	PAS	—N/a	—N/a
P.064	Ipoh Timor	Thomas Su Keong Siong (PH)	Kathleen Wong Mei Yin	MCA	Wong Kah Woh	DAP	—N/a	—N/a	—N/a	—N/a
P.065	Ipoh Barat	Kulasegaran Murugeson (PH)	Cheng Wei Yee	MCA	Kulasegaran Murugeson	DAP	—N/a	—N/a	—N/a	—N/a
P.066	Batu Gajah	Sivakumar Varatharaju Naidu (PH)	Leong Chee Wai	MCA	Sivakumar Varatharaju Naidu	DAP	—N/a	—N/a	Segar Kunasekaran	PSM
P.067	Kuala Kangsar	Mastura Mohd. Yazid (BN)	Mastura Mohd. Yazid	UMNO	Ahmad Termizi Ramli	Amanah	Khalil Idham Lim Abdullah	PAS	—N/a	—N/a
P.068	Beruas	Ngeh Koo Ham (PH)	Pang Chok King	Gerakan	Ngeh Koo Ham	DAP	Mohamad Nazeer M K M Hameed	PAS	—N/a	—N/a
P.069	Parit	Mohd. Zaim Abu Hasan (BN)	Mohd Nizar Zakaria	UMNO	Tarmizi Mohd Jam	Amanah	Najihatussalehah Ahmad	PAS	—N/a	—N/a
P.070	Kampar	Dr. Ko Chung Sen (PH)	Lee Chee Leong	MCA	Thomas Su Keong Siong	DAP	Yougan Mahalingam	PAS	—N/a	—N/a
P.071	Gopeng	Lee Boon Chye (PH)	Heng Seai Kie	MCA	Lee Boon Chye	PKR	Ismail Ariffin	PAS	—N/a	—N/a
P.072	Tapah	Saravanan Murugan (BN)	Saravanan Murugan	MIC	Mohamed Azni Mohamed Ali	PPBM	Nor Azli Musa	PAS	—N/a	—N/a
P.073	Pasir Salak	Tajuddin Abdul Rahman (BN)	Tajuddin Abdul Rahman	UMNO	Salihuddin Radin Sumadi	PPBM	Zafarul Azhan Zan	PAS	—N/a	—N/a
P.074	Lumut	Cdre. Mohamad Imran Abd Hamid (Rtd.) (PH)	Zambry Abdul Kadir	UMNO	Dr. Mohammad Hatta Ramli	Amanah	Mohd Zamri Ibrahim	PAS	—N/a	—N/a
P.075	Bagan Datuk	Dr. Ahmad Zahid Hamidi (BN)	Ahmad Zahid Hamidi	UMNO	Pakhrurrazi Arshad	PKR	Abdul Munim Hasan Adli	PAS	—N/a	—N/a
P.076	Teluk Intan	Mah Siew Keong (BN)	Mah Siew Keong	Gerakan	Nga Kor Ming	DAP	Ahmad Ramadzan Ahmad Daud	PAS	—N/a	—N/a
P.077	Tanjong Malim	Ong Ka Chuan (BN)	Mah Hang Soon	MCA	Chang Lih Kang	PKR	Mohd Tarmizi Abd Rahman	PAS	—N/a	—N/a

=== Pahang (14) ===
Federal constituency		Incumbent MP	Political parties							
Federal constituency		Incumbent MP	Barisan Nasional		Pakatan Harapan		Gagasan Sejahtera		Other parties	
Federal constituency		Incumbent MP	Candidate Name	Party	Candidate Name	Party	Candidate Name	Party	Candidate Name	Party
P.078	Cameron Highlands	Palanivel Govindasamy (BN)	Sivarraajh Chandran	MIC	Manogaran Marimuthu	DAP	Wan Mahadir Wan Mahmud	PAS	Suresh Kumar (PSM); Mohd. Tahir Kassim (BERJASA)	
P.079	Lipis	Abdul Rahman Mohamad (BN)	Abdul Rahman Mohamad	UMNO	Ahmad Pozi Yahya	PPBM	Sobirin Duli	PAS	—N/a	—N/a
P.080	Raub	Mohd. Ariff Sabri Abdul Aziz (PH)	Chew Mei Fun	MCA	Tengku Zulpuri Shah Raja Puji	DAP	Mohamed Nilam Abdul Manap	PAS	—N/a	—N/a
P.081	Jerantut	Ahmad Nazlan Idris (BN)	Ahmad Nazlan Idris	UMNO	Wan Mohd Shahrir Abdul Jalil	PPBM	Yohanis Ahmad	PAS	—N/a	—N/a
P.082	Indera Mahkota	Fauzi Abdul Rahman (PH)	Johan Mat Sah	UMNO	Saifuddin Abdullah	PKR	Nasrudin Hassan	PAS	—N/a	—N/a
P.083	Kuantan	Fuziah Salleh (PH)	Andrew Wong Kean Hwee	MCA	Fuziah Salleh	PKR	Sulaiman Mat Derus	PAS	—N/a	—N/a
P.084	Paya Besar	Vacant	Mohd. Shahar Abdullah	UMNO	Ashraf Mustaqim Badrul Munir	PPBM	Mohamad Azhar Mohd Noor	PAS	—N/a	—N/a
P.085	Pekan	Mohd. Najib Abdul Razak (BN)	Mohd. Najib Abdul Razak	UMNO	Kamarul Arifin Mohd Shahar	PPBM	Muhammad Zahid Md. Arip	PAS	—N/a	—N/a
P.086	Maran	Ismail Abdul Muttalib (BN)	Ismail Abdul Muttalib	UMNO	Ahmad Farid Nordin	PPBM	Hasenan Haron	PAS	—N/a	—N/a
P.087	Kuala Krau	Ismail Mohamed Said (BN)	Ismail Mohamed Said	UMNO	Mohamad Rafidee Hassim	PPBM	Kamal Ashaari	PAS	—N/a	—N/a
P.088	Temerloh	Nasrudin Hassan (GS)	Mohd Sharkar Shamsudin	UMNO	Anuar Tahir	Amanah	Mohd Jusoh Darus	PAS	Mohd Khaidir Ahmad	IND
P.089	Bentong	Liow Tiong Lai (BN)	Liow Tiong Lai	MCA	Wong Tack	DAP	N. Balasubramaniam	PAS	—N/a	—N/a
P.090	Bera	Ismail Sabri Yaakob (BN)	Ismail Sabri Yaakob	UMNO	Zakaria Abdul Hamid	PKR	Musanif Abdul Rahman	PAS	—N/a	—N/a
P.091	Rompin	Hasan Ariffin (BN)	Hasan Ariffin	UMNO	Sitarunisah Ab Kadir	PKR	Mohd Shahrul Nizam Abdul Haliff	PAS	—N/a	—N/a

=== Selangor (22) ===
Federal constituency		Incumbent MP	Political parties							
Federal constituency		Incumbent MP	Barisan Nasional		Pakatan Harapan		Gagasan Sejahtera		Other parties	
Federal constituency		Incumbent MP	Candidate Name	Party	Candidate Name	Party	Candidate Name	Party	Candidate Name	Party
P.092	Sabak Bernam	Mohd. Fasiah Mohd. Fakeh (BN)	Mohd. Fasiah Mohd. Fakeh	UMNO	Warno Dogol	PPBM	Muhammad Labib Abdul Jalil	PAS	—N/a	—N/a
P.093	Sungai Besar	Budiman Mohd. Zohdi (BN)	Budiman Mohd. Zohdi	UMNO	Muslimin Yahaya	PPBM	Muhammad Salleh Mohd Hussien	PAS	—N/a	—N/a
P.094	Hulu Selangor	Kamalanathan Panchanathan (BN)	Kamalanathan Panchanathan	MIC	Leow Hsiad Hui	PKR	Wan Mat Wan Sulaiman	PAS	Kumar S. Paramasivam	IND
P.095	Tanjong Karang	Noh Omar (BN)	Noh Omar	UMNO	Zulkafperi Hanapi	PPBM	Nor Az Azlan Ahmad	PAS	—N/a	—N/a
P.096	Kuala Selangor	Dr. Irmohizam Ibrahim (BN)	Irmohizam Ibrahim	UMNO	Dzulkefly Ahmad	Amanah	Mohd Fakaruddin Ismail	PAS	—N/a	—N/a
P.097	Selayang	William Leong Jee Keen (PH)	Kang Meng Fuat	MCA	William Leong Jee Keen	PKR	Hashim Abd Karim	Berjasa	—N/a	—N/a
P.098	Gombak	Mohamed Azmin Ali (PH)	Abdul Rahim Pandak Kamarudin	UMNO	Mohamed Azmin Ali	PKR	Khairil Nizam Khirudin	PAS	—N/a	—N/a
P.099	Ampang	Zuraida Kamarudin (PH)	Leong Kim Soon	MCA	Zuraida Kamarudin	PKR	Nurul Islam Mohamed Yusoff	PAS	Tan Hua Meng	PRM
P.100	Pandan	Rafizi Ramli (PH)	Leong Kok Wee	MCA	Wan Azizah Wan Ismail	PKR	Mohamed Sukri Omar	PAS	Jenice Lee Ying Ha	PRM
P.100	Pandan	Rafizi Ramli (PH)	Leong Kok Wee	MCA	Wan Azizah Wan Ismail	PKR	Mohamed Sukri Omar	PAS	Mohd Khairul Azam Abdul Aziz	IND
P.101	Hulu Langat	Che Rosli Che Mat (GS)	Azman Ahmad	UMNO	Hasanuddin Mohd Yunus	Amanah	Che Rosli Che Mat	PAS	—N/a	—N/a
P.102	Bangi	Ong Kian Ming (PH)	Liew Yuen Keong	MCA	Ong Kian Ming	DAP	Mohd Shafie Ngah	PAS	Dennis Wan Jinn Woei	PRM
P.103	Puchong	Gobind Singh Deo (PH)	Ang Chin Tat	Gerakan	Gobind Singh Deo	DAP	Mohd Rosarizan Mohd Roslan	PAS	—N/a	—N/a
P.104	Subang	Wong Chen (PH)	Tan Seong Lim	MCA	Wong Chen	PKR	Mohd Shahir Mohd Adnan	Ikatan	Toh Sin Wah	IND
P.105	Petaling Jaya	Hee Loy Sian (PH)	Chew Hian Tat	MCA	Maria Chin Abdullah	PKR	Noraini Hussin	PAS	—N/a	—N/a
P.106	Damansara	Tony Pua (PH)	Ho Kwok Xheng	MCA	Tony Pua	DAP	—N/a	—N/a	Wong Mun Kheong	PRM
P.107	Sungai Buloh	Sivarasa Rasiah (PH)	Prakash Rao Applanaidoo	MIC	Sivarasa Rasiah	PKR	Nuridah Mohd Salleh	PAS	Zainurizzaman Mohram	PSM
P.108	Shah Alam	Khalid Abdul Samad (PH)	Azhari Shaari	UMNO	Khalid Abdul Samad	Amanah	Mohd Zuhdi Marzuki	PAS	—N/a	—N/a
P.109	Kapar	Manivannan Gowindasamy (PH)	Mohana Muniandy Raman	MIC	Abdullah Sani Abdul Hamid	PKR	Abdul Rani Osman	PAS	Manikavasagam Sundaram	PRM
P.110	Klang	Charles Santiago (PH)	Ching Eu Boon	MCA	Charles Santiago	DAP	Khairulshah Kotapan Abdullah	PAS	Puvananderan Ganasamoorthy	IND
P.111	Kota Raja	Dr. Siti Mariah Mahmud (PH)	V. Gunalan Velu	MIC	Mohamad Sabu	Amanah	Mohamed Diah Baharun	PAS	—N/a	—N/a
P.112	Kuala Langat	Abdullah Sani Abdul Hamid (PH)	Sharil Sufian Hamdan	UMNO	Xavier Jayakumar Arulanandam	PKR	Yahya Baba	PAS	—N/a	—N/a
P.113	Sepang	Mohamed Hanipa Maidin (PH)	Marsum Paing	UMNO	Mohamed Hanipa Maidin	Amanah	Sabirin Marsono	PAS	—N/a	—N/a

=== Kuala Lumpur (11) ===
Federal constituency		Incumbent MP	Political parties					
Federal constituency		Incumbent MP	Barisan Nasional		Pakatan Harapan		Gagasan Sejahtera	
Federal constituency		Incumbent MP	Candidate Name	Party	Candidate Name	Party	Candidate Name	Party
P.114	Kepong	Dr. Tan Seng Giaw (PH)	Ong Siang Liang	Gerakan	Lim Lip Eng	DAP	—N/a	—N/a
P.115	Batu	Chua Tian Chang (PH)	Dominic Lau Chai Hoe	Gerakan	—N/a	—N/a	Azhar Yahya	PAS
P.116	Wangsa Maju	Tan Kee Kwong (PH)	Yeow Teong Look	MCA	Tan Yee Kew	PKR	Razali Tumiran	PAS
P.117	Segambut	Lim Lip Eng (PH)	Loga Bala Mohan Jaganathan	myPPP	Hannah Yeoh Tseou Tsuan	DAP	Mohd Solleh Abdul Karim	PAS
P.118	Setiawangsa	Ahmad Fauzi Zahari (BN)	Zulhasnan Rafique	UMNO	Nik Nazmi Nik Ahmad	PKR	Ubaid Abdul Akla	PAS
P.119	Titiwangsa	Johari Abdul Ghani (BN)	Johari Abdul Ghani	UMNO	Rina Mohd Harun	PPBM	Mohamad Noor Mohamad	PAS
P.120	Bukit Bintang	Fong Kui Lun (PH)	Tan Ean Ean	MCA	Fong Kui Lun	DAP	—N/a	—N/a
P.121	Lembah Pantai	Nurul Izzah Anwar (PH)	Raja Nong Chik Zainal Abidin	UMNO	Fahmi Fadzil	PKR	Fauzi Abu Bakar	PAS
P.122	Seputeh	Teresa Kok Suh Sim (PH)	Chan Quin Er	MCA	Teresa Kok Suh Sim	DAP	—N/a	—N/a
P.123	Cheras	Tan Kok Wai (PH)	Heng Sinn Yee	MCA	Tan Kok Wai	DAP	—N/a	—N/a
P.124	Bandar Tun Razak	Abdul Khalid Ibrahim (IND)	Adnan Seman @ Abdullah	UMNO	Kamarudin Jaffar	PKR	Rosni Adam	PAS

=== Putrajaya (1) ===
Federal constituency		Incumbent MP	Political parties					
Federal constituency		Incumbent MP	Barisan Nasional		Pakatan Harapan		Gagasan Sejahtera	
Federal constituency		Incumbent MP	Candidate Name	Party	Candidate Name	Party	Candidate Name	Party
P.125	Putrajaya	Tengku Adnan Tengku Mansor (BN)	Tengku Adnan Tengku Mansor	UMNO	Samsu Adabi Mamat	PPBM	Zainal Abidin Kidam	PAS

=== Negeri Sembilan (8) ===
Federal constituency		Incumbent MP	Political parties					
Federal constituency		Incumbent MP	Barisan Nasional		Pakatan Harapan		Gagasan Sejahtera	
Federal constituency		Incumbent MP	Candidate Name	Party	Candidate Name	Party	Candidate Name	Party
P.126	Jelebu	Vacant	Jalaluddin Alias	UMNO	Mustafar Abdul Kadir	Amanah	Norman Ipin	PAS
P.127	Jempol	Mohd. Isa Abdul Samad (BN)	Mohd Salim Shariff	UMNO	Kamarulzaman Kamdias	PPBM	Mustaffa Daharun	PAS
P.128	Seremban	Anthony Loke Siew Fook (PH)	Chong Sin Woon	MCA	Anthony Loke Siew Fook	DAP	Shariffudin Ahmad	PAS
P.129	Kuala Pilah	Hasan Malek (BN)	Hasan Malek	UMNO	Eddin Syazlee Shith	PPBM	Rafiei Mustapha	PAS
P.130	Rasah	Teo Kok Seong (PH)	Ng Kean Nam	MCA	Cha Kee Chin	DAP	Mohd Khairil Anuar Mohd Wafa	PAS
P.131	Rembau	Brig. Gen. Khairy Jamaluddin (BN)	Khairy Jamaluddin	UMNO	Roseli Abdul Gani	PKR	Mustafa Dolah	PAS
P.132	Port Dickson	Kamarul Baharin Abbas (PH)	V.S. Mogan	MIC	Danyal Balagopal Abdullah	PKR	Mahfuz Roslan	PAS
P.133	Tampin	Shaziman Abu Mansor (BN)	Shaziman Abu Mansor	UMNO	Hasan Baharom	Amanah	Abdul Halim Abu Bakar	PAS

=== Malacca (6) ===
Federal constituency		Incumbent MP	Political parties					
Federal constituency		Incumbent MP	Barisan Nasional		Pakatan Harapan		Gagasan Sejahtera	
Federal constituency		Incumbent MP	Candidate Name	Party	Candidate Name	Party	Candidate Name	Party
P.134	Masjid Tanah	Mas Ermieyati Samsudin (BN)	Mas Ermieyati Samsudin	UMNO	Sabirin Ja’afar	PPBM	Nasir Othman	PAS
P.135	Alor Gajah	Koh Nai Kwong (BN)	Wong Nai Chee	MCA	Mohd Redzuan Md Yusof	PPBM	Mohammad Nazree Mohammad Aris	PAS
P.136	Tangga Batu	Dr. Abu Bakar Mohamed Diah (BN)	Zali Mat Yasin	UMNO	Rusnah Aluai	PKR	Zulkifli Ismail	PAS
P.137	Hang Tuah Jaya	Shamsul Iskandar Mohd. Akin (PH)	Mohd. Ali Mohd. Rustam	UMNO	Shamsul Iskandar Mohd. Akin	PKR	Md Khalid Kassim	PAS
P.138	Kota Melaka	Sim Tong Him (IND)	Choo Wei Sern	MCA	Khoo Poay Tiong	DAP	—N/a	—N/a
P.139	Jasin	Ahmad Hamzah (BN)	Ahmad Hamzah	UMNO	Khairuddin Abu Hassan	Amanah	Abd Alim Shapie	PAS

=== Johor (26) ===
Federal constituency		Incumbent MP	Political parties					
Federal constituency		Incumbent MP	Barisan Nasional		Pakatan Harapan		Gagasan Sejahtera	
Federal constituency		Incumbent MP	Candidate Name	Party	Candidate Name	Party	Candidate Name	Party
P.140	Segamat	Subramaniam Sathasivam (BN)	Subramaniam Sathasivam	MIC	Santhara Kumar Ramanaidu	PKR	Khairul Faizi Ahmad Kamil	PAS
P.141	Sekijang	Anuar Abdul Manap (BN)	Ayub Rahmat	UMNO	Natrah Ismail	PKR	—N/a	—N/a
P.142	Labis	Chua Tee Yong (BN)	Chua Tee Yong	MCA	Pang Hok Liong	DAP	Sarchu Sawal	PAS
P.143	Pagoh	Muhyiddin Yassin (PH)	Ismail Mohamed	UMNO	Muhyiddin Yassin	PPBM	Ahmad Nawfal Mahfodz	PAS
P.144	Ledang	Ir. Dr. Hamim Samuri (BN)	Hamim Samuri	UMNO	Syed Ibrahim Syed Noh	PKR	Rusman Kemin	PAS
P.145	Bakri	Er Teck Hwa (PH)	Koh Chon Chai	MCA	Yeo Bee Yin	DAP	Mohammad Zahrul Salleh	PAS
P.146	Muar	Razali Ibrahim (BN)	Razali Ibrahim	UMNO	Syed Saddiq Syed Abdul Rahman	PPBM	Abdul Aziz Talib	PAS
P.147	Parit Sulong	Dr. Noraini Ahmad (BN)	Noraini Ahmad	UMNO	Anis Afida Mohd Azli	Amanah	Ahmad Rosdi Bahari	PAS
P.148	Ayer Hitam	Ir. Dr. Wee Ka Siong (BN)	Wee Ka Siong	MCA	Liew Chin Tong	DAP	Mardi Marwan	PAS
P.149	Sri Gading	Ab. Aziz Kaprawi (BN)	Ab. Aziz Kaprawi	UMNO	Shahruddin Md Salleh	PPBM	M. Ash'ari Sidon	PAS
P.150	Batu Pahat	Mohd. Idris Jusi (PH)	Halizah Abdullah	UMNO	Mohd Rashid Hasnon	PKR	Mahfodz Mohamed	PAS
P.151	Simpang Renggam	Liang Teck Meng (BN)	Liang Teck Meng	Gerakan	Maszlee Malik	PPBM	Mohd Jubri Selamat	PAS
P.152	Kluang	Liew Chin Tong (PH)	Gan Ping Sieu	MCA	Wong Shu Qi	DAP	Muhammad Hasbullah Md Najib	PAS
P.153	Sembrong	Hishammuddin Hussein (BN)	Hishammuddin Hussein	UMNO	Onn Abu Bakar	PKR	—N/a	—N/a
P.154	Mersing	Dr. Abdul Latiff Ahmad (BN)	Abdul Latiff Ahmad	UMNO	Nasir Hashim	PPBM	A. Rahman A. Hamid	PAS
P.155	Tenggara	Halimah Mohamed Sadique (BN)	Adham Baba	UMNO	Norjepri Mohamed Jelani	PPBM	Yuhanita Yunan	PAS
P.156	Kota Tinggi	Noor Ehsanuddin Mohd. Harun Narrashid (BN)	Halimah Mohamed Sadique	UMNO	Azlinda Abdul Latif	PPBM	—N/a	—N/a
P.157	Pengerang	Azalina Othman Said (BN)	Azalina Othman Said	UMNO	Norliza Ngadiman	PPBM	—N/a	—N/a
P.158	Tebrau	Khoo Soo Seang (BN)	Hou Kok Chung	MCA	Choong Shiau Yoon	PKR	Abdullah Husin	PAS
P.159	Pasir Gudang	Normala Abdul Samad (BN)	Mohamed Khaled Nordin	UMNO	Hassan Abdul Karim	PKR	Ab Aziz Abdullah	PAS
P.160	Johor Bahru	Shahrir Abdul Samad (BN)	Shahrir Abdul Samad	UMNO	Akmal Nasrullah Mohd Nasir	PKR	—N/a	—N/a
P.161	Pulai	Nur Jazlan Mohamed (BN)	Nur Jazlan Mohamed	UMNO	Salahuddin Ayub	Amanah	Mohd Mazri Yahya	PAS
P.162	Iskandar Puteri	Lim Kit Siang (PH)	Jason Teoh Sew Hock	MCA	Lim Kit Siang	DAP	—N/a	—N/a
P.163	Kulai	Teo Nie Ching (PH)	Tang Nai Soon	MCA	Teo Nie Ching	DAP	Juwahir Amin	PAS
P.164	Pontian	Ahmad Maslan (BN)	Ahmad Maslan	UMNO	Karmaine Sardini	PPBM	Baharom Mohamad	PAS
P.165	Tanjung Piai	Wee Jeck Seng (BN)	Wee Jeck Seng	MCA	Md Farid Md Rafik	PPBM	Nordin Othman	Berjasa

=== Labuan (1) ===
Federal constituency		Incumbent MP	Political parties									
Federal constituency		Incumbent MP	Barisan Nasional		Pakatan Harapan		Gagasan Sejahtera		Gabungan Sabah		Other parties	
Federal constituency		Incumbent MP	Candidate Name	Party	Candidate Name	Party	Candidate Name	Party	Candidate Name	Party	Candidate Name	Party
P.166	Labuan	Rozman Isli (BN)	Rozman Isli	UMNO	—N/a	—N/a	Ahmad Junid Mohd. Aling	PAS	Siti Zaleha S.W. Ibrahim	PHRS	Noor Halim Zaini	WARISAN

=== Sabah (25) ===
Federal constituency		Incumbent MP	Political parties									
Federal constituency		Incumbent MP	Barisan Nasional		Pakatan Harapan		Gagasan Sejahtera		Gabungan Sabah Bersatu		Other parties	
Federal constituency		Incumbent MP	Candidate Name	Party	Candidate Name	Party	Candidate Name	Party	Candidate Name	Party	Candidate Name	Party
P.167	Kudat	Abdul Rahim Bakri (BN)	Abdul Rahim Bakri	UMNO	—N/a	—N/a	—N/a	—N/a	Mohd. Ashraf Chin Abdullah	PPRS	Sh. Azman Sh. Along	WARISAN
P.168	Kota Marudu	Dr. Maximus Johnity Ongkili (BN)	Dr. Maximus Johnity Ongkili	PBS	—N/a	—N/a	—N/a	—N/a	Maijol Mahap	PHRS	Barlus Mangabis (WARISAN); Dr. Paul Porodong (PCS)	
P.169	Kota Belud	Abdul Rahman Dahlan (BN)	Dr. Mohd. Salleh Mohd. Said	UMNO	—N/a	—N/a	Ag. Laiman Ikin	PAS	Miasin Mion	PHRS	Isnaraissah Munirah Majilis	WARISAN
P.170	Tuaran	Wilfred Madius Tangau (BN)	Wilfred Madius Tangau	UPKO	Chrisnadia Sinam	PKR	Mohd. Aminuddin Aling	PAS	Syra Peter Gom	PHRS	Kalakau Untol	PCS
P.171	Sepanggar	Jumat Idris (BN)	Abdul Rahman Dahlan	UMNO	—N/a	—N/a	—N/a	—N/a	Jeffrey Kumin	SAPP	Mohd. Azis Jamman (WARISAN); Robert Sopining (PCS)	
P.172	Kota Kinabalu	Jimmy Wong Sze Phin (PH)	Joseph Lee Han Kyun	PBS	Chan Foong Hin	DAP	—N/a	—N/a	Yong Teck Lee	SAPP	—N/a	—N/a
P.173	Putatan	Dr. Makin Marcus Mojigoh (BN)	Dr. Makin Marcus Mojigoh	UPKO	Awang Husaini Sahari	PKR	Zulzaim Hilmee Abidin	PAS	Edmund Jivol Doudilim	PHRS	Mil Kusin Abdillah Sulai	ANAK NEGERI
P.174	Penampang	Ignatius Dorell Leiking (WARISAN)	Caesar Mandela Malakun	UPKO	—N/a	—N/a	—N/a	—N/a	Cleftus Stephen Spine	STAR	Ignatius Dorell Leiking (WARISAN); Dr. Edwin Bosi (ANAK NEGERI)	
P.175	Papar	Rosnah Abdul Rashid Shirlin (BN)	Rosnah Abdul Rashid Shirlin	UMNO	—N/a	—N/a	—N/a	—N/a	Jamil William Core	STAR	Ahmad Hassan (WARISAN); Elbert Sikuil (PCS)	
P.176	Kimanis	Anifah Aman (BN)	Anifah Aman	UMNO	—N/a	—N/a	—N/a	—N/a	Jaafar Ismail	PHRS	Karim Bujang	WARISAN
P.177	Beaufort	Azizah Mohd. Dun (BN)	Azizah Mohd. Dun	UMNO	John Ghani	PKR	—N/a	—N/a	Lajim Ukin	PHRS	—N/a	—N/a
P.178	Sipitang	Sapawi Ahmad (BN)	Yamani Hafez Musa	UMNO	—N/a	—N/a	—N/a	—N/a	Dayang Aezzy Liman	PHRS	Noor Hayaty Mustapha	WARISAN
P.179	Ranau	Dr. Ewon Ebin (BN)	Dr. Ewon Ebin	UPKO	Jonathan Yasin	PKR	—N/a	—N/a	Soudi Andang	STAR	Andau Yasun	PCS
P.180	Keningau	Joseph Pairin Kitingan (BN)	Daniel Kinsik	PBS	—N/a	—N/a	—N/a	—N/a	Dr. Jeffrey Kitingan	STAR	Jake Nointin (WARISAN); Jius Awang (PCS); Maimin Rijan (IND); Justin Guka (IND)	
P.181	Tenom	Raime Unggi (BN)	Rubin Balang	UMNO	Noorita Sual	DAP	—N/a	—N/a	Yuslinah Laikim	PHRS	—N/a	—N/a
P.182	Pensiangan	Joseph Kurup (BN)	Arthur Joseph Kurup	PBRS	Raymond Ahuar	PKR	—N/a	—N/a	Richard Joe Jimmy	STAR	Maidin Osman (PCS); Engah Sintan (IND)	
P.183	Beluran	Dr. Ronald Kiandee (BN)	Dr. Ronald Kiandee	UMNO	—N/a	—N/a	—N/a	—N/a	Sipin Kadandi (PHRS); Lem Matin (PPRS)		Dr. Japar Zairun (WARISAN); Toidy Luit (PCS); Salimah Oyong (IND)	
P.184	Libaran	Juslie Ajirol (BN)	Zakaria Mohd. Edris	UMNO	—N/a	—N/a	—N/a	—N/a	Alfian Mansyur	PHRS	Irwanshah Mustapa	WARISAN
P.185	Batu Sapi	Linda Tsen Thau Lin (BN)	Linda Tsen Thau Lin	PBS	Hamzah Abdullah	AMANAH	Norsah Bongsu	PAS	—N/a	—N/a	Liew Vui Keong	WARISAN
P.186	Sandakan	Stephen Wong Tien Fatt (PH)	Lim Ming Hoo	LDP	Stephen Wong Tien Fatt	DAP	—N/a	—N/a	—N/a	—N/a	—N/a	—N/a
P.187	Kinabatangan	Bung Moktar Radin (BN)	Bung Moktar Radin	UMNO	—N/a	—N/a	—N/a	—N/a	Mustapa Datu Tambuyong	PHRS	Ghazali Abdul Ghani	WARISAN
P.188	Silam	Datu Nasrun Datu Mansur (BN)	Datu Nasrun Datu Mansur	UMNO	—N/a	—N/a	Ramli Pataruddin	PAS	Siti Shazianti Ajak	PHRS	Mohammadin Ketapi	WARISAN
P.189	Semporna	Mohd. Shafie Apdal (WARISAN)	Ramlee Marhaban	UMNO	—N/a	—N/a	Abdul Nasir Ab. Raup	PAS	Asmara Asmad	PHRS	Mohd. Shafie Apdal	WARISAN
P.190	Tawau	Dr. Mary Yap Kain Ching (BN)	Dr. Mary Yap Kain Ching	PBS	Christina Liew Chin Jin	PKR	Mohamad Husain	PAS	Alizaman Jijurahman	PHRS	—N/a	—N/a
P.191	Kalabakan	Abdul Ghapur Salleh (BN)	Abdul Ghapur Salleh	UMNO	—N/a	—N/a	Norbin Aloh	PAS	Ahmad Lahama	PPRS	Ma'mun Sulaiman	WARISAN

=== Sarawak (31) ===
Federal constituency		Incumbent MP	Political parties							
Federal constituency		Incumbent MP	Barisan Nasional		Pakatan Harapan		Gagasan Sejahtera		Other parties	
Federal constituency		Incumbent MP	Candidate Name	Party	Candidate Name	Party	Candidate Name	Party	Candidate Name	Party
P.192	Mas Gading	Anthony Nogeh Gumbek (BN)	Anthony Nogeh Gumbek	SPDP	Mordi Bimol	DAP	—N/a	—N/a	—N/a	—N/a
P.193	Santubong	Dr. Wan Junaidi Tuanku Jaafar (BN)	Wan Junaidi Tuanku Jaafar	PBB	Mohamad Fidzuan Zaidi	Amanah	—N/a	—N/a	—N/a	—N/a
P.194	Petra Jaya	Fadillah Yusof (BN)	Fadillah Yusof	PBB	Ir. Dr. Nor Irwan Ahmad Nor	PKR	Hamdan Sani	PAS	—N/a	—N/a
P.195	Bandar Kuching	Chong Chieng Jen (PH)	Kho Teck Wan	SUPP	Kelvin Yii Lee Wuen	DAP	—N/a	—N/a	—N/a	—N/a
P.196	Stampin	Julian Tan Kok Ping (PH)	Dr. Sim Kui Hian	SUPP	Chong Chieng Jen	DAP	—N/a	—N/a	—N/a	—N/a
P.197	Kota Samarahan	Rubiah Wang (BN)	Rubiah Wang	PBB	Sopian Julaihi	Amanah	Zulkipli Ramzi	PAS	—N/a	—N/a
P.198	Puncak Borneo	Dr. James Dawos Mamit (BN)	Genot Sibek @ Jeannoth Sinel	PBB	Willie Mongin	PKR	—N/a	—N/a	Buln Ribos	STAR
P.199	Serian	Richard Riot Jaem (BN)	Richard Riot Jaem	SUPP	Edward Andrew Luwak	DAP	—N/a	—N/a	Senior William Rade	IND
P.200	Batang Sadong	Nancy Shukri (BN)	Nancy Shukri	PBB	Othman Mustapha	AMANAH	Asan Singkro	PAS	—N/a	—N/a
P.201	Batang Lupar	Rohani Abdul Karim (BN)	Rohani Abdul Karim	PBB	Narudin Mentali	AMANAH	Wan Abdillah Wan Ahmad	PAS	—N/a	—N/a
P.202	Sri Aman	Masir Kujat (BN)	Masir Kujat	PRS	Norina Utot	PKR	—N/a	—N/a	Cobbold John Lusoi	PBDS Baru
P.203	Lubok Antu	William Nyallau Badak (BN)	Robert Pasang Alam	PRS	Nicholas Bawin Anggat	PKR	—N/a	—N/a	Jugah Muyang	IND
P.204	Betong	Douglas Uggah Embas (BN)	Robert Lawson Chuat	PBB	Noel Changgai Bucking	PKR	—N/a	—N/a	Abang Ahmad Abang Suni	IND
P.205	Saratok	William Mawan Ikom (BN)	Subeng Mula	SPDP	Ali Biju	PKR	—N/a	—N/a	—N/a	—N/a
P.206	Tanjong Manis	Norah Abdul Rahman (BN)	Yusuf Abd. Wahab	PBB	Mohamad Fadillah Sabali	AMANAH	—N/a	—N/a	—N/a	—N/a
P.207	Igan	Wahab Dolah (BN)	Ahmad Johnie Zawasi	PBB	Andri Zulkarnaen Hamdan	AMANAH	—N/a	—N/a	—N/a	—N/a
P.208	Sarikei	Wong Ling Biu (PH)	Huang Tiong Sii	SUPP	Wong Ling Biu	DAP	—N/a	—N/a	Wong Chin King	PBK
P.209	Julau	Joseph Salang Gandum (BN)	Joseph Salang Gandum	PRS	—N/a	—N/a	—N/a	—N/a	Larry Soon	IND
P.210	Kanowit	Aaron Ago Dagang (BN)	Aaron Ago Dagang	PRS	Satu Anchom	PKR	—N/a	—N/a	—N/a	—N/a
P.211	Lanang	Alice Lau Kiong Yieng (PH)	Kong Sien Chiu	SUPP	Alice Lau Kiong Yieng	DAP	—N/a	—N/a	Priscilla Lau	PEACE
P.212	Sibu	Oscar Ling Chai Yew (PH)	Andrew Wong Kee Yew	SUPP	Oscar Ling Chai Yew	DAP	—N/a	—N/a	Tiong Ing Tung	STAR
P.212	Sibu	Oscar Ling Chai Yew (PH)	Andrew Wong Kee Yew	SUPP	Oscar Ling Chai Yew	DAP	—N/a	—N/a	Tiew Yen Houng	PEACE
P.213	Mukah	Muhammad Leo Abdullah (BN)	Hanifah Hajar Taib	PBB	Abdul Jalil Bujang	PKR	—N/a	—N/a	—N/a	—N/a
P.214	Selangau	Joseph Entulu Belaun (BN)	Rita Sarimah Patrick	PRS	Baru Bian	PKR	—N/a	—N/a	—N/a	—N/a
P.215	Kapit	Alexander Nanta Linggi (BN)	Alexander Nanta Linggi	PBB	Paren Nyawi	DAP	—N/a	—N/a	—N/a	—N/a
P.216	Hulu Rajang	Wilson Ugak Kumbong (BN)	Wilson Ugak Kumbong	PRS	Abun Sui Anyit	PKR	—N/a	—N/a	—N/a	—N/a
P.217	Bintulu	Tiong King Sing (BN)	Tiong King Sing	SPDP	Tony Chan Yew Chiew	DAP	—N/a	—N/a	Chieng Lea Phing	STAR
P.218	Sibuti	Ahmad Lai Bujang (BN)	Lukanisman Awang	PBB	Jemat Panjang	PKR	Zulaihi Bakar	PAS	—N/a	—N/a
P.219	Miri	Dr. Michael Teo Yu Keng (PH)	Sabastian Tin Chew Liew	SUPP	Dr. Michael Teo Yu Keng	PKR	—N/a	—N/a	—N/a	—N/a
P.220	Baram	Anyi Ngau (BN)	Anyi Ngau	SPDP	Roland Egan	PKR	—N/a	—N/a	—N/a	—N/a
P.221	Limbang	Hasbi Habibollah (BN)	Hasbi Habibollah	PBB	Dr. Ricardo Yampil Baba	PKR	—N/a	—N/a	—N/a	—N/a
P.222	Lawas	Henry Sum Agong (BN)	Henry Sum Agong	PBB	Danny Piri	PKR	—N/a	—N/a	Mohammad Brahim	IND

== The contested state seats ==
A total of 505 seats from 12 state legislative assemblies are contested in the 14th general election.

=== Perlis (15) ===
State constituency		Incumbent MLA	Political parties							
State constituency		Incumbent MLA	Barisan Nasional		Gagasan Sejahtera		Pakatan Harapan		Other parties	
State constituency		Incumbent MLA	Candidate Name	Party	Candidate Name	Party	Candidate Name	Party	Candidate Name	Party
N.01	Titi Tinggi	Khaw Hock Kong (BN)	Teh Chai Aan	MCA	Kamis Yub	PAS	Teh Seng Chuan	DAP	Yaacob Man	IND
N.02	Beseri	Mat Rawi Kassim (BN)	Ruzaini Rais	UMNO	Azamhari Mohamood	PAS	Wan Kharizal Wan Khazim	Amanah	—N/a	—N/a
N.03	Chuping	Asmaiza Ahmad (BN)	Asmaiza Ahmad	UMNO	Mohd. Ali Puteh	PAS	Poziyah Hamzah	PKR	—N/a	—N/a
N.04	Mata Ayer	Khairi Hasan (BN)	Siti Berenee Yahaya	UMNO	Mohammad Yahya	PAS	Azhar Omar	PPBM	—N/a	—N/a
N.05	Santan	Sabry Ahmad (BN)	Azizan Sulaiman	UMNO	Baharuddin Ahmad	PAS	Che Mazlina Che Yob	Amanah	—N/a	—N/a
N.06	Bintong	Rela Ahmad (BN)	Azlan Man	UMNO	Abd. Jamil Kamis	PAS	Mokhtar Che Kassim	Amanah	—N/a	—N/a
N.07	Sena	Abdul Jamil Saad (BN)	Azihani Ali	UMNO	Fakhrul Anwar Ismail	PAS	Asrul Nizan Abd Jalil	PKR	—N/a	—N/a
N.08	Indera Kayangan	Chan Ming Kai (PH)	Chuah Tian Hee	MCA	Wan Hassan Wan Ismail	PAS	Gan Ay Ling	PKR	—N/a	—N/a
N.09	Kuala Perlis	Mat Hassan (BN)	Azam Rashid	UMNO	Mohamad Fuat Abu Bakar	PAS	Nor Azam Karap	PKR	—N/a	—N/a
N.10	Kayang	Ahmad Bakri Ali (BN)	Hamizan Hassan	UMNO	Md Radzi Hassan	PAS	Abdul Hannaan Khairy	PPBM	—N/a	—N/a
N.11	Pauh	Azlan Man (BN)	Rozieana Ahmad	UMNO	Idris Yaacob	PAS	Ameir Hassan	PPBM	—N/a	—N/a
N.12	Tambun Tulang	Ismail Kassim (BN)	Ismail Kassim	UMNO	Abu Bakar Ali	PAS	Maton Din	PPBM	—N/a	—N/a
N.13	Guar Sanji	Jafperi Othman (BN)	Afifi Osman	UMNO	Mohd Ridzuan Hashim	PAS	Baridah Che Nayan	PPBM	—N/a	—N/a
N.14	Simpang Empat	Nurulhisham Yaakob (BN)	Nurulhisham Yaakob	UMNO	Russele Eizan	PAS	Wan Noralhakim Shaghir Saad	PKR	—N/a	—N/a
N.15	Sanglang	Mohd Shukri Ramli (GS)	Zaidi Saidin	UMNO	Mohd. Shukri Ramli	PAS	Zolkharnain Abidin	Amanah	—N/a	—N/a

=== Kedah (36) ===
State constituency		Incumbent MLA	Political parties							
State constituency		Incumbent MLA	Barisan Nasional		Pakatan Harapan		Gagasan Sejahtera		Other parties	
State constituency		Incumbent MLA	Candidate Name	Party	Candidate Name	Party	Candidate Name	Party	Candidate Name	Party
N.01	Ayer Hangat	Mohd. Rawi Abdul Hamid (BN)	Mohd Rawi Abdul Hamid	UMNO	Johari Bulat	PPBM	Azlina Azinan	PAS	—N/a	—N/a
N.02	Kuah	Nor Saidi Nanyan (BN)	Nor Saidi Nanyan	UMNO	Mohd Firdaus Ahmad	PPBM	Mazlan Ahmad	PAS	Mohamad Ratu Mansor	IND
N.03	Kota Siputeh	Abu Hasan Sarif (BN)	Ahmad Azhar Abdullah	UMNO	Salmee Said	Amanah	Mat Rejab Md Akhir	PAS	—N/a	—N/a
N.04	Ayer Hitam	Mukhriz Mahathir (PH)	Abu Hasan Sharif	UMNO	A. Aziz Mohamod	PPBM	Azhar Ibrahim	PAS	—N/a	—N/a
N.05	Bukit Kayu Hitam	Ahmad Zaini Japar (BN)	Ahmad Zaini Jaapar	UMNO	Halimaton Shaadiah Saad	PPBM	Habshah Bakar	PAS	—N/a	—N/a
N.06	Jitra	Aminuddin Omar (BN)	Aminuddin Omar	UMNO	Mukhriz Mahathir	PPBM	Zulhazmi Othman	PAS	—N/a	—N/a
N.07	Kuala Nerang	Badrol Hisham Hashim (BN)	Badrol Hisham Hashim	UMNO	Syed Fadzil Syed Embun	PPBM	Munir @ Mohamad Yusuf Zakaria	PAS	—N/a	—N/a
N.08	Pedu	Kama Noriah Ibrahim (BN)	Kama Noriah Ibrahim	UMNO	Hashim Idris	PKR	Mohd Radzi Md Amin	PAS	—N/a	—N/a
N.09	Bukit Lada	Ahmad Lebai Sudin (BN)	Ariffin Man	UMNO	Mohd Aizad bin Roslan	PPBM	Salim Mahmood	PAS	Ismail Othman	IND
N.10	Bukit Pinang	Romani Wan Salim (GS)	Mohammad Nawar Ariffin	UMNO	Che Mat Dzaher Ahmad	PKR	Wan Romani Wan Salim	PAS	—N/a	—N/a
N.11	Derga	Tan Kok Yew (PH)	Cheah Soon Hai	Gerakan	Tan Kok Yew	DAP	Yahya Saad	PAS	—N/a	—N/a
N.12	Suka Menanti	Ahmad Bashah Md. Hanipah (BN)	Ahmad Bashah Md Hanipah	UMNO	Zamri Yusuf	PKR	Mohd Sabri Omar	PAS	—N/a	—N/a
N.13	Kota Darul Aman	Teoh Boon Kok (PH)	Tan Eng Hwa	MCA	Teh Swee Leong	DAP	Zulkifli Che Haron	PAS	Tan Kang Yap	PRM
N.14	Alor Mengkudu	Ahmad Saad (GS)	Abdul Malik Saad	UMNO	Phahrolrazi Mohd Zawawi	Amanah	Ahmad Yahya	PAS	—N/a	—N/a
N.15	Anak Bukit	Amiruddin Hamzah (PH)	Johari Aziz	UMNO	Amiruddin Hamzah	PPBM	Hamdi Ishak	PAS	—N/a	—N/a
N.16	Kubang Rotan	Mohd. Nasir Mustafa (GS)	Abdul Muthalib Harun	UMNO	Mohd Asmirul Anuar Aris	Amanah	Omar Saad	PAS	—N/a	—N/a
N.17	Pengkalan Kundor	Phahrolrazi Zawawi (PH)	Abd. Halim Said	UMNO	Ismail Salleh	Amanah	Ahmad Fakhruddin Sheikh Fakhrurazi	PAS	—N/a	—N/a
N.18	Tokai	Mohamed Taulan Mat Rasul (GS)	Fatahi Omar	UMNO	Mohd Firdaus Jaafar	Amanah	Mohd Hayati Othman	PAS	—N/a	—N/a
N.19	Sungai Tiang	Suraya Yaacob (BN)	Suraya Yaacob	UMNO	Abdul Razak Khamis	PPBM	Saiful Syazwan Shafie	PAS	—N/a	—N/a
N.20	Sungai Limau	Mohd. Azam Samat (GS)	Norma Awang	UMNO	Zahran Abdullah	Amanah	Mohd Azam Samat	PAS	—N/a	—N/a
N.21	Guar Chempedak	Dr. Ku Abdul Rahman Ku Ismail (BN)	Ku Abd Rahman Ku Ismail	UMNO	Mohd Saffuan Sabari	PPBM	Musoddak Ahmad	PAS	—N/a	—N/a
N.22	Gurun	Dr. Leong Yong Kong (BN)	Boey Chin Gan	MCA	Johari Abdul	PKR	Muzaini Azizan	PAS	Palaniappan Marimuthu	IND
N.23	Belantek	Mohd. Tajudin Abdullah (BN)	Mohd Tajudin Abdullah	UMNO	Abdul Rashid Abdullah	Amanah	Mad Isa Shafie	PAS	—N/a	—N/a
N.24	Jeneri	Mahadzir Abdul Hamid (BN)	Mahadzir Abdul Hamid	UMNO	Mohd Nazri bin Abu Hassan	PPBM	Muhammad Sanusi Md Noor	PAS	—N/a	—N/a
N.25	Bukit Selambau	Krishnamoorthy Rajannaidu (PH)	Jaspal Singh Gurbakhes Singh	MIC	Summugam Rengasamy	PKR	Mohd Ali Sulaiman	PAS	—N/a	—N/a
N.26	Tanjong Dawai	Tajul Urus Mat Zain (BN)	Anuar Ahmad	UMNO	Annuar Abd Hamid	PPBM	Hanif Ghazali	PAS	—N/a	—N/a
N.27	Pantai Merdeka	Ali Yahaya (BN)	Ali Yahaya	UMNO	Rosli Yusof	Amanah	Ahmas Fadzli Hashim	PAS	—N/a	—N/a
N.28	Bakar Arang	Ooi Tze Min (PH)	Ko Hung Weng	MCA	Ooi Tze Min	PKR	Othman Che Mee	PAS	Tan Khee Chye	PRM
N.28	Bakar Arang	Ooi Tze Min (PH)	Ko Hung Weng	MCA	Ooi Tze Min	PKR	Othman Che Mee	PAS	Tan Hock Huat	IND
N.29	Sidam	Robert Ling Kui Ee (PH)	Tan Kok Seong	Gerakan	Robert Ling Kui Ee	PKR	Norhidayah Foo Abdullah	PAS	Mohd Hashim Saaludin	PRM
N.30	Bayu	Azmi Che Husain (BN)	Mohamed Noor Mohamed Amin	UMNO	Abd Rahim Kechik	PPBM	Abd Nasir Idris	PAS	—N/a	—N/a
N.31	Kupang	Harun Abdul Aziz (BN)	Harun Abdul Aziz	UMNO	Johari Abdullah	Amanah	Najmi Ahmad	PAS	—N/a	—N/a
N.32	Kuala Ketil	Md. Zuki Yusof (GS)	Mohd. Khairul Abdullah	UMNO	Mohamad Sofee Razak	PKR	Mansor Zakaria	PAS	—N/a	—N/a
N.33	Merbau Pulas	Siti Aishah Ghazali (GS)	Asmadi Abu Talib	UMNO	Abd. Razak Salleh	Amanah	Siti Aishah Ghazali	PAS	—N/a	—N/a
N.34	Lunas	Azman Nasrudin (PH)	Thuraisingam K.S. Muthu	MIC	Azman Nasrudin	PKR	Ahmad Taufiq Baharum	PAS	—N/a	—N/a
N.35	Kulim	Chua Thiong Gee (BN)	Chua Thiong Gee	MCA	Yeo Keng Chuan	PKR	Mohd Khairi Mohd Salleh	PAS	Lee Ah Liong	PRM
N.36	Bandar Baharu	Norsabrina Mohd. Noor (BN)	Norsabrina Mohd Noor	UMNO	Azimi Daim	PPBM	Rohaizat Ja'afar	PAS	—N/a	—N/a

=== Kelantan (45) ===
State constituency		Incumbent MLA	Political parties							
State constituency		Incumbent MLA	Barisan Nasional		Pakatan Harapan		Gagasan Sejahtera		Other parties	
State constituency		Incumbent MLA	Candidate Name	Party	Candidate Name	Party	Candidate Name	Party	Candidate Name	Party
N.01	Pengkalan Kubor	Mat Razi Mat Ail (BN)	Mat Razi Mat Ali	UMNO	Wan Rosdi Mat Rasik	PKR	Wan Roslan Wan Hamat	PAS	—N/a	—N/a
N.02	Kelaboran	Mohamad Zaki Ibrahim (GS)	Hashim Mohamad	UMNO	Nik Faezah Nik Othman	Amanah	Mohd Adanan Hassan	PAS	—N/a	—N/a
N.03	Pasir Pekan	Ahmad Yaakob (GS)	Wan Mohd Sanusi Wan Yunus	UMNO	Wan Johari Wan Othman	PPBM	Ahmad Yaakob	PAS	—N/a	—N/a
N.04	Wakaf Bharu	Che Abdullah Mat Nawi (GS)	Mohd Rosdi Ab Aziz	UMNO	Mohd Khir Zahari Abdul Ghani	Amanah	Mohd Rusli Abdullah	PAS	—N/a	—N/a
N.05	Kijang	Wan Ubaidah Omar (GS)	Wan Shahrul Azwan Abd Aziz	UMNO	Nik Azmi Nik Osman	PKR	Izani Husin	PAS	—N/a	—N/a
N.06	Chempaka	Ahmad Fathan Mahmood (GS)	Mohd Fareez Noor Amran	UMNO	Nik Omar Nik Abdul Aziz	Amanah	Ahmad Fathan Mahmood	PAS	—N/a	—N/a
N.07	Panchor	Mohd. Amar Abdullah (GS)	Zarina Eusope	UMNO	Mohd Zulhazmi Hassan	Amanah	Mohd Amar Abdullah	PAS	—N/a	—N/a
N.08	Tanjong Mas	Rohani Ibrahim (GS)	Madihah Abd Aziz	UMNO	Hafidzah Mustakim	Amanah	Rohani Ibrahim	PAS	—N/a	—N/a
N.09	Kota Lama	Anuar Tan Abdullah (GS)	Chua Hock Kuan	MCA	Ab Rashid Ab Rahman	PPBM	Anuar Tan Abdullah	PAS	Khairul Nizam Abdul Ghani	PSM
N.09	Kota Lama	Anuar Tan Abdullah (GS)	Chua Hock Kuan	MCA	Ab Rashid Ab Rahman	PPBM	Anuar Tan Abdullah	PAS	Izat Bukhary Ismail Bukhary	IND
N.10	Bunut Payong	Dr. Ramli Mamat (GS)	Mohamed Hasna Che Hussin	UMNO	Sanusi Othman	Amanah	Ramli Mamat	PAS	—N/a	—N/a
N.11	Tendong	Rozi Muhamad (GS)	Yahaya Mamat	UMNO	Wan Zulkhairi Wan Mad. Zin	PPBM	Rozi Muhamad	PAS	Ibrahim Ali	IND
N.12	Pengkalan Pasir	Hanifa Ahmad (GS)	Che Johan Che Pa	UMNO	Sharani Mohd Naim	Amanah	Hanifa Ahmad	PAS	Suharto Mat Nasir	IND
N.13	Chetok	Abdul Halim Abdul Rahman (GS)	Muhammad Afifi Muhammad Noor	UMNO	Mohd Romizu Mohd Ali	Amanah	Mohd Nassuruddin Daud	PAS	Che Daud Che Man	IND
N.14	Meranti	Mohd. Nassuruddin Daud (GS)	Ahmad Anuar Hussin	UMNO	Ali Abdu Rahman Hasan	Amanah	Zuraidin Abdullah	PAS	—N/a	—N/a
N.15	Gual Periok	Mohamad Awang (GS)	Ghazali Ismail	UMNO	Mohd Ridzuan Muhamad	Amanah	Mohamad Awang	PAS	—N/a	—N/a
N.16	Bukit Tuku	Abdul Rasul Mohamed (GS)	Akbar Salim	UMNO	Mohd Hisyamuddin Ghazali	Amanah	Abdul Rasul Mohamed	PAS	—N/a	—N/a
N.17	Salor	Husam Musa (PH)	Mohamad Noordin Awang	UMNO	Husam Musa	Amanah	Saiful Adli Abu Bakar	PAS	—N/a	—N/a
N.18	Pasir Tumboh	Abd. Rahman Yunus (GS)	Bakri Yusof	UMNO	Mohd Noor Mat Yajid	Amanah	Abd Rahman Yunus	PAS	—N/a	—N/a
N.19	Demit	Mumtaz Md. Nawi (GS)	Nurul Amal Mohd Fauzi	UMNO	Wan Ahmad Kamil Wan Abdullah	Amanah	Mumtaz Md Nawi	PAS	—N/a	—N/a
N.20	Tawang	Hassan Mohamood (GS)	Mohd Radzuan Abdullah	UMNO	—N/a	—N/a	Hassan Mohamood	PAS	—N/a	—N/a
N.21	Perupok	Mohd. Huzaimy Che Husin (GS)	Ilias Husain	UMNO	Ismail Ghani	Amanah	Mohd Huzaimy Che Husin	PAS	—N/a	—N/a
N.22	Jelawat	Abdul Azziz Kadir (GS)	Mohd Radzuan Hamat	UMNO	Mohd. Fami Zakaria	PPBM	Abdul Azziz Kadir	PAS	—N/a	—N/a
N.23	Melor	Dr. Md. Yusnan Yusof (GS)	Azmi Ishak	UMNO	Abdul Aziz Abdul Kadir	PKR	Md Yusnan Yusof	PAS	—N/a	—N/a
N.24	Kadok	Azami Mohd. Nor (GS)	Mohammad Azam Ismail	UMNO	Che Ibrahim Mohamad	Amanah	Azami Mohd Nor	PAS	—N/a	—N/a
N.25	Kok Lanas	Md. Alwi Che Ahmad (BN)	Md Alwi Che Ahmad	UMNO	Mohd Hanapi Ismail	Amanah	Nik Mahadi Nik Mahmood	PAS	—N/a	—N/a
N.26	Bukit Panau	Abdul Fattah Mahmood (GS)	Dayang Saniah Awang Hamid	UMNO	Hisham Fauzi	Amanah	Abdul Fattah Mahmood	PAS	—N/a	—N/a
N.27	Gual Ipoh	Bakri Mustapha (BN)	Mohd. Bakri Mustapha	UMNO	Mohd Soba Hussin	Amanah	Wan Yusuf W Mustapha	PAS	—N/a	—N/a
N.28	Kemahang	Maj. Md. Anizam Ab. Rahman (Rtd.) (GS)	Wan Rakemi Wan Zahari	UMNO	Bahari Mohamad Nor	PPBM	Md Anizam Ab Rahman	PAS	—N/a	—N/a
N.29	Selising	Zulkefli Ali (BN)	Zulkifle Ali	UMNO	Ismail Mohamad	PKR	Tuan Mohd Sharipudin Tuan Ismail	PAS	—N/a	—N/a
N.30	Limbongan	Mohd. Nazlan Mohamed Hasbullah (GS)	Mohd Hanafiah Abdul Aziz	UMNO	Zarir Yaakob	Amanah	Mohd Nazlan Mohamed Hasbullah	PAS	—N/a	—N/a
N.31	Semerak	Zawawi Othman (BN)	Zawawi Othman	UMNO	Wan Marzudi Wan Omar	PPBM	Wan Hassan Wan Ibrahim	PAS	—N/a	—N/a
N.32	Gaal	Tuan Mazlan Tuan Mat (GS)	Mohd Kaisan Ab Rahman	UMNO	Ab Rahman Yaacob	Amanah	Mohd Rodzi Ja'afar	PAS	—N/a	—N/a
N.33	Pulai Chondong	Zulkifli Mamat (GS)	Ahmad Tarmizi Ismail	UMNO	Ab Halim @ Kamaruddin Ab Kadir	PPBM	Azhar Salleh	PAS	—N/a	—N/a
N.34	Temangan	Mohamed Fadzil Hassan (GS)	Wan Mohd Adnan Wan Aziz	UMNO	Mohd. Redzuan Alias	PKR	Mohamed Fadzli Hassan	PAS	—N/a	—N/a
N.35	Kemuning	Mohd. Roseli Ismail (GS)	Eriandi Ismail	UMNO	Abdul Kadir Othman	Amanah	Mohd Roseli Ismail	PAS	—N/a	—N/a
N.36	Bukit Bunga	Mohd. Adhan Kechik (BN)	Mohd Adhan Kechik	UMNO	Asran Alias	PPBM	Ramzi Mohd Yusoff	PAS	—N/a	—N/a
N.37	Air Lanas	Mustapa Mohamed (BN)	Mustapa Mohamed	UMNO	Aminuddin Yaacob	PPBM	Abdullah Ya'kub	PAS	—N/a	—N/a
N.38	Kuala Balah	Abdul Aziz Derashid (BN)	Abdul Aziz Derashid	UMNO	—N/a	—N/a	Mohd Apandi Mohamad	PAS	—N/a	—N/a
N.39	Mengkebang	Abdul Latiff Abdul Rahman (GS)	Zaki Muhammad	UMNO	Wan Mohammad Azlan Ahmad	Amanah	Muhammad Mat Sulaiman	PAS	—N/a	—N/a
N.40	Guchil	Mohd. Roslan Puteh (PH)	Zuber Hassan	UMNO	Mohd Roslan Puteh	PKR	Hilmi Abdullah	PAS	Abd. Aziz Ahmad	IND
N.41	Manek Urai	Mohd. Fauzi Abdullah (GS)	Suzaini Adlina Sukri	UMNO	Mohamed Dahan Mat Jali	PPBM	Mohd Fauzi Abdullah	PAS	Deraman Mamat	IND
N.42	Dabong	Ramzi Ab. Rahman (BN)	Muhammad Awang	UMNO	Wan Ahmad Fadzil Wan Omar	PPBM	Ku Mohd Zaki Ku Hussien	PAS	—N/a	—N/a
N.43	Nenggiri	Vacant	Ab Aziz Yusoff	UMNO	Othman Yusoff	PKR	Mohd Saupi Abdul Razak	PAS	—N/a	—N/a
N.44	Paloh	Nozula Mat Diah (BN)	Amran Arifin	UMNO	Noraini Husain	PKR	Azman Ahmad	PAS	—N/a	—N/a
N.45	Galas	Ab. Aziz Yusoff (BN)	Mohd Syahbuddin Hashim	UMNO	Nasir Dollah	PPBM	Suhaimi Mat Deris	PAS	—N/a	—N/a

=== Terengganu (32) ===
State constituency		Incumbent MLA	Political parties					
State constituency		Incumbent MLA	Barisan Nasional		Pakatan Harapan		Gagasan Sejahtera	
State constituency		Incumbent MLA	Candidate Name	Party	Candidate Name	Party	Candidate Name	Party
N.01	Kuala Besut	Tengku Zaihan Che Ku Abdul Rahman (BN)	Tengku Zaihan Che Ku Abdul Rahman	UMNO	Che Ku Hashim Che Ku Mat	PPBM	Azbi Salleh	PAS
N.02	Kota Putera	Mohd. Mahdi Musa (BN)	Mohd Mahdi Musa	UMNO	Tengku Roslan Tengku Othman	PKR	Mohd Nurkhuzaini Ab Rahman	PAS
N.03	Jertih	Muhammad Pehimi Yusof (BN)	Muhammad Pehimi Yusof	UMNO	Kamarulzaman Wan Su	Amanah	Wan Azhar Wan Ahmad	PAS
N.04	Hulu Besut	Nawi Mohamad (BN)	Nawi Mohamad	UMNO	Ismail Abdul Kadir	PPBM	Mat Daik Mohamad	PAS
N.05	Jabi	Mohd. Iskandar Jaafar (BN)	Mohd Iskandar Jaafar	UMNO	Abd Aziz Abas	Amanah	Azman Ibrahim	PAS
N.06	Permaisuri	Mohd. Jidin Shafee (BN)	Halim Jusoh	UMNO	Wan Mokhtar Wan Ibrahim	PKR	Zul Bhari A. Rahman	PAS
N.07	Langkap	Sabri Mohd. Noor (BN)	Sabri Mohd Noor	UMNO	Mustaffa Abdullah	PPBM	Azmi Maarof	PAS
N.08	Batu Rakit	Bazlan Abd. Rahman (BN)	Bazlan Abd Rahman	UMNO	Amir Long	PPBM	Mohd Shafizi Ismail	PAS
N.09	Tepuh	Hishamuddin Abdul Karim (GS)	Basir Ismail	UMNO	Wan Hafizie Suzlie Wan Hassan	PPBM	Hishamuddin Abdul Karim	PAS
N.10	Teluk Pasu	Ridzuan Hashim (GS)	Che Mansor Salleh	UMNO	Azik Chik	Amanah	Ridzuan Hashim	PAS
N.11	Seberang Takir	Ahmad Razif Abdul Rahman (BN)	Ahmad Razif Abdul Rahman	UMNO	Abu Bakar Abdullah	PKR	Mohd. Fazil Wahab	PAS
N.12	Bukit Tunggal	Alias Razak (GS)	Tuan Arif Shahibu Fadilah Tuan Ahmad	UMNO	Fatimah Lailati Omar	PKR	Alias Razak	PAS
N.13	Wakaf Mempelam	Mohd. Abdul Wahid Endut (GS)	Salleh Othman	UMNO	Zubir Mohamed	Amanah	Wan Shukairi Wan Abdullah	PAS
N.14	Bandar	Azan Ismail (PH)	Toh Seng Cheng	MCA	Azan Ismail	PKR	Ahmad Shah Muhamed	PAS
N.15	Ladang	Tengku Hassan Tengku Omar (GS)	Mohd Sabri Alwi	UMNO	Zulkifli Mohamad	PPBM	Tengku Hassan Tengku Omar	PAS
N.16	Batu Buruk	Dr. Syed Azman Syed Ahmad Nawawi (GS)	Zamri Awang Hitam	UMNO	Raja Kamarul Bahrin Shah Raja Ahmad	Amanah	Muhammad Khalil Abdul Hadi	PAS
N.17	Alur Limbat	Ariffin Deraman (GS)	Saiful Bahri Baharuddin	UMNO	Ahmad Sabri Ali	PKR	Ariffin Deraman	PAS
N.18	Bukit Payung	Mohd. Nor Hamzah (GS)	Toh Puan Zaitun Mat Amin	UMNO	Mohd Dalizan Abd Aziz	Amanah	Mohd. Nor Hamzah	PAS
N.19	Rhu Rendang	Abdul Hadi Awang (GS)	Nik Dir Nik Wan Ku	UMNO	Zarawi Sulong	Amanah	Ahmad Samsuri Mokhtar	PAS
N.20	Pengkalan Berangan	A. Latiff Awang (BN)	A. Latiff Awang	UMNO	Aidi Ahmad	PPBM	Sulaiman Sulong	PAS
N.21	Telemong	Rozi Mamat (BN)	Rozi Mamat	UMNO	Sharifah Norhayati Syed Omar	PKR	Kamaruzaman Abdullah	PAS
N.22	Manir	Hilmi Harun (GS)	Yusof Awang Hitam	UMNO	Hafizuddin Hussin	Amanah	Hilmi Harun	PAS
N.23	Kuala Berang	Tengku Putera Tengku Awang (BN)	Tengku Putera Tengku Awang	UMNO	Mohd Nor Othman	PKR	Mamad Puteh	PAS
N.24	Ajil	Ghazali Taib (BN)	Ghazali Taib	UMNO	Zamani Mamat	PPBM	Maliaman Kassim	PAS
N.25	Bukit Besi	Roslee Daud (BN)	Roslee Daud	UMNO	Mohamad Arif Arifin	PPBM	Ghazali Sulaiman	PAS
N.26	Rantau Abang	Alias Daud (GS)	Zaulkfli Wan Gati	UMNO	Mohammad Padeli Jusoh	PKR	Alias Harun	PAS
N.27	Sura	Wan Hapandi Wan Nik (GS)	Zainun Abu Bakar	UMNO	Zulkifli Ali	Amanah	Wan Hapandi Wan Nik	PAS
N.28	Paka	Saiful Bahri Mamat (GS)	Tengku Hamzah Tengku Draman	UMNO	Mohd Hasbie Muda	Amanah	Saiful Bahri Mamat	PAS
N.29	Kemasik	Rosli Othman (BN)	Rosli Othman	UMNO	Rizan Ali	Amanah	Saiful Azmi Suhaili	PAS
N.30	Kijal	Ahmad Said (BN)	Ahmad Said	UMNO	Wan Marzuki Wan Sembok	PPBM	Hazri Jusoh	PAS
N.31	Chukai	Hanafiah Mat (GS)	Mohamed Awang Tera	UMNO	Husain Safri Muhammad	PKR	Hanafiah Mat	PAS
N.32	Air Putih	Wan Abdul Hakim Wan Mokhtar (BN)	Wan Abdul Hakim Wan Mokhtar	UMNO	Mohd Zukri Aksah	PKR	Ab. Razak Ibrahim	PAS

=== Penang (40) ===
State constituency		Incumbent MLA	Political parties							
State constituency		Incumbent MLA	Barisan Nasional		Pakatan Harapan		Gagasan Sejahtera		Other parties	
State constituency		Incumbent MLA	Candidate Name	Party	Candidate Name	Party	Candidate Name	Party	Candidate Name	Party
N.01	Penaga	Mohd. Zain Ahmad (BN)	Mohd. Zain Ahmad	UMNO	—N/a	—N/a	Mohd. Yusni Mat Piah	PAS	—N/a	—N/a
N.02	Bertam	Shariful Azhar Othman (BN)	Shariful Azhar Othman	UMNO	Khaliq Mehtab Mohd. Ishaq	PPBM	Mokhtar Ramly	PAS	—N/a	—N/a
N.03	Pinang Tunggal	Roslan Saidin (BN)	Roslan Saidin	UMNO	Ir. Ahmad Zakiyuddin Abd. Rahman	PKR	Bukhori Ghazali	PAS	—N/a	—N/a
N.04	Permatang Berangan	Omar Abdul Hamid (BN)	Nor Hafizah Othman	UMNO	Mohd. Shariff Omar	PPBM	Sobri Salleh	PAS	Azman Shah Othman	PRM
N.05	Sungai Dua	Muhamad Yusoff Mohd. Noor (BN)	Muhamad Yusoff Mohd. Noor	UMNO	Yusri Ishak	AMANAH	Zahadi Mohd.	PAS	—N/a	—N/a
N.06	Telok Ayer Tawar	Jahara Hamid (BN)	Zamri Che Ros	UMNO	Mustafa Kamal Ahmad	PKR	Hanif Haron	PAs	Lee Thian Hong	PRM
N.07	Sungai Puyu	Phee Boon Poh (PH)	Lim Hai Song	MCA	Phee Boon Poh	DAP	—N/a	—N/a	Tan Lay Hock (PRM); Ong Yin Yin (PFP); Neoh Bok Keng (MU)	
N.08	Bagan Jermal	Lim Hock Seng (PH)	Ang Chor Keong	MCA	Soon Lip Chee	DAP	—N/a	—N/a	Teoh Chai Deng (PRM); Fabian George Albart (PFP); Hari Devyndran Muniswaran (MU)	
N.09	Bagan Dalam	Tanasekharan Autherapady (PH)	Dhinagaran Jayabalan	MIC	Satees Muniandy	DAP	—N/a	—N/a	Teoh Huck Ping (PRM); Jasper Ooi Zong Han (PFP); Teoh Uat Lye (MU)	
N.10	Seberang Jaya	Dr. Afif Bahardin (PH)	Abu Bakar Sidekh Zainul Abidin	UMNO	Dr. Afif Bahardin	PKR	Ahmad Rafaei A. Rashid	PAS	—N/a	—N/a
N.11	Permatang Pasir	Mohd. Salleh Man (GS)	Anuar Faisal Yahaya	UMNO	Faiz Fadzil	PKR	Muhammad Fauzi Yusoff	PAS	—N/a	—N/a
N.12	Penanti	Dr. Norlela Ariffin (PH)	Suhaimi Sabudin	UMNO	Dr. Norlela Ariffin	PKR	Muhammad Fawwaz Mohamad Jan	PAS	—N/a	—N/a
N.13	Berapit	Ong Kok Fooi (PH)	Goh Swee Gim	MCA	Heng Lee Lee	DAP	—N/a	—N/a	Song Chee Meng (PRM); Lee Poh Kong (PFP)	
N.14	Machang Bubok	Lee Khai Loon (PH)	Tan Teik Cheng	MCA	Lee Khai Loon	DAP	Md. Jamil Abd. Rahman	PAS	Tang Ah Ba (PRM); Lim Jhun Hou (MU)	
N.15	Padang Lalang	Chong Eng (PH)	Kuan Hin Yeep	MCA	Chong Eng	DAP	—N/a	—N/a	Lai Yean Nee (PRM); Liew Ee Jin (PFP)	
N.16	Perai	Dr. Ramasamy Palanisamy (PH)	Suresh Muniandy	MIC	Dr. Ramasamy Palanisamy	DAP	Asoghan Govindaraju	PAS	Samuganathan Muniandy (PRM); Ooi Khar Giap (PFP); Isumary Retnam (IND)	
N.17	Bukit Tengah	Ong Chin Wen (PH)	Dr. Thor Teong Gee	GERAKAN	Gooi Hsiao-Leung	DAP	Norazman Ishak	PAS	Tang Hiang Lye (PRM); Edward Joseph (PFP)	
N.18	Bukit Tambun	Law Choo Kiang (PH)	Hartini Tan Abdullah	GERAKAN	Goh Choon Aik	DAP	Kumaravelu Arumugam	PAS	Goh Bee Koon (PRM); Ong Seong Lu (PFP)	
N.19	Jawi	Soon Lip Chee (PH)	Dr. Kiew Hen Chong	GERAKAN	H'ng Mooi Lye	DAP	—N/a	—N/a	Tan Chew Suan (PRM); Daphne Edward (PFP); Koay Xing Book (MU); Tan Beng Huat (PAP)	
N.20	Sungai Bakap	Makhtar Shapee (PH)	Mohamed Sani Bakar	UMNO	Dr. Amar Pritpal Abdullah	PKR	Osman Jaafar	PAS	Tan Chow Kang	PRM
N.21	Sungai Acheh	Mahmud Zakaria (BN)	Mahmud Zakaria	UMNO	Zulkifli Ibrahim	PKR	Nor Zamri Latiff	PAS	—N/a	—N/a
N.22	Tanjung Bungah	Teh Yee Cheu (PH)	Teng Chang Yeow	GERAKAN	Zairil Khir Johari	DAP	—N/a	—N/a	Chua Cheong Wee (PRM); Marvin Lee Zheng Yong (MU)	
N.23	Air Puteh	Lim Guan Eng (PH)	Tang Heap Seng	GERAKAN	Lim Guan Eng	DAP	—N/a	—N/a	Manikandan Ramayah (PCM); Tan Gin Theam (MU)	
N.24	Kebun Bunga	Cheah Kah Peng (PH)	Ooi Zhi Yi	GERAKAN	Jason Ong Khan Lee	DAP	—N/a	—N/a	Wu Kai Min	MU
N.25	Pulau Tikus	Yap Soo Huey (PH)	Jason Loo Jieh Sheng	GERAKAN	Chris Lee Chun Kit	DAP	—N/a	—N/a	Wee Kian Wai	MU
N.26	Padang Kota	Chow Kon Yeow (PH)	H'ng Khoon Leng	GERAKAN	Chow Kon Yeow	DAP	—N/a	—N/a		
N.27	Pengkalan Kota	Lau Keng Ee (PH)	Lim Swee Bok	MCA	Gooi Zi Sen	DAP	—N/a	—N/a	Chew Seng Tung (PRM); Koay Teng Lye (MU); Ragindran Sivasamy (IND)	
N.28	Komtar	Teh Lai Heng (PH)	Tan Hing Teik	MCA	Teh Lai Heng	DAP	—N/a	—N/a	Ong Chun Jiet	MU
N.29	Datok Keramat	Jagdeep Singh Deo (PH)	Lee Boon Then	MCA	Jagdeep Singh Deo	DAP	—N/a	—N/a	Nicholas Diane (PFP); Lim Boo Chang (MU); Muhammad Majnun Abdul Wahab (IND)	
N.30	Sungai Pinang	Lim Siew Khin (PH)	Ng Fook On	GERAKAN	Lim Siew Khim	DAP	Yaacob Omar	PAS	Teh Yee Cheu (PSM); Tan Sim Bee (MU); Mohamed Yacoob Mohamed Noor (IND)	
N.31	Batu Lancang	Law Heng Kiang (PH)	Peggie Koo Pei Chee	GERAKAN	Ong Ah Teong	DAP	—N/a	—N/a	Kee Lean Ee	MU
N.32	Seri Delima	Sanisvara Nethaji Rayer (PH)	Khoo Kay Teong	MCA	Syerleena Abdul Rashid	DAP	—N/a	—N/a	Tan Yang Yung	MU
N.33	Air Itam	Wong Hon Wai (PH)	Tan Kah Leong	GERAKAN	Joseph Ng Soon Siang	DAP	—N/a	—N/a	Kang Teik Woi	MU
N.34	Paya Terubong	Yeoh Soon Hin (PH)	Wong Chin Chong	MCA	Yeoh Soon Hin	DAP	—N/a	—N/a	Kuan Aun Wan	MU
N.35	Batu Uban	Jayabalan Thambyappa (PH)	Hng Chee Wey	GERAKAN	Kumaresan Aramugam	DAP	Vikneswaran Muniandy	PAS	Teoh Kean Liang (PFP); Teoh Kok Siang (MU)	
N.36	Pantai Jerejak	Mohd. Rashid Hasnon (PH)	Oh Tong Keong	GERAKAN	Saifuddin Nasution Ismail	PKR	Mohd. Farhan Yusri	PAS	David Yim Boon Leong	MU
N.37	Batu Maung	Abdul Malik Abul Kassim (PH)	Liakat Ali Mohamed Ali	UMNO	Abdul Halim Hussain	PKR	Saiful Lizan Md. Yusoff	PAS	—N/a	—N/a
N.38	Bayan Lepas	Nordin Ahmad (BN)	Rusli Hashim	UMNO	Azrul Mahathir Aziz	PKR	Zarina Shinta Madar	PAS	—N/a	—N/a
N.39	Pulau Betong	Dr. Muhamad Farid Saad (BN)	Dr. Muhamad Farid Saad	UMNO	Tuah Ismail	PKR	Mohd. Taufik Hashim	PAS	Yeoh Cheng Huat	PRM
N.40	Telok Bahang	Shah Haedan Ayoob Hussain Shah (BN)	Shah Haedan Ayoob Hussain Shah	UMNO	Zolkifly Md. Lazim	PKR	Mohd. Ali Othman	PAS	—N/a	—N/a

=== Perak (59) ===
State constituency		Incumbent MLA	Political parties							
State constituency		Incumbent MLA	Barisan Nasional		Pakatan Harapan		Gagasan Sejahtera		Other parties/Ind	
State constituency		Incumbent MLA	Candidate Name	Party	Candidate Name	Party	Candidate Name	Party	Candidate Name	Party
N.01	Pengkalan Hulu	Azmel Ibrahim (BN)	Azmel Ibrahim	UMNO	Dr. Ahmad Safwan Mohamad	PPBM	Mohd Hamidi Ismail	PAS	—N/a	—N/a
N.02	Temenggor	Salbiah Mohamed (BN)	Salbiah Mohamed	UMNO	Mohd. Fadzil Abdul Aziz	PPBM	Kapten (B) Md Pozi Md Sani	PAS	—N/a	—N/a
N.03	Kenering	Mohd. Tarmizi Idris (BN)	Mohd. Tarmizi Idris	UMNO	Noor Sham Abu Samah	PKR	Azhar Rasdi	PAS	—N/a	—N/a
N.04	Kota Tampan	Saarani Mohamad (BN)	Saarani Mohamad	UMNO	Noor Hasnida Mohd. Hashim	PPBM	Muhamad Rif'aat Razman	PAS	—N/a	—N/a
N.05	Selama	Mohamad Daud Mohd. Yusoff (BN)	Faizul Mohd Shohor	UMNO	Razali Ismail	Amanah	Mohd Akmal Kamaruddin	PAS	—N/a	—N/a
N.06	Kubu Gajah	Ahmad Hasbullah Alias (BN)	Saliza Ahmad	UMNO	Mat Supri Musa	PPBM	Khalil Yahaya	PAS	—N/a	—N/a
N.07	Batu Kurau	Dr. Muhammad Amin Zakaria (BN)	Dr. Muhammad Amin Zakaria	UMNO	Muhamad Aiman Aizuddin Md Husin	PKR	Mohd Shahir Mohd Hassan	PAS	Zainal Abidin Abd Rahman	BERJASA
N.08	Titi Serong	Abu Bakar Hussain (GS)	Norsalewati Mat Norwani	UMNO	Hasnul Zulkarnain Abdul Munaim	Amanah	Haji Abdu Bakar Mohd Desa	PAS	—N/a	—N/a
N.09	Kuala Kurau	Abdul Yunus Jamahri (PH)	Shahrul Nizam Razali	UMNO	Abdul Yunus Jamahri	PKR	Abdul Baharin Mohd Desa	PAS	—N/a	—N/a
N.10	Alor Pongsu	Sham Mat Sahat (BN)	Sham Mat Sahat	UMNO	Ahmad Zaki Husin	PKR	Wan Tarmizi Abd Aziz	PAS	—N/a	—N/a
N.11	Gunong Semanggol	Mohd. Zawawi Abu Hassan (GS)	Zaini Cha	UMNO	Ismail Ali	PPBM	Haji Razman Zakaria	PAS	—N/a	—N/a
N.12	Selinsing	Husin Din (GS)	Mohamad Nor Dawoo	UMNO	Ahmad Saqid Ansorullah Ahmad Jihbadz Mokhlis	Amanah	Husin Din	PAS	—N/a	—N/a
N.13	Kuala Sepetang	Chua Yee Ling (PH)	Mohd Kamaruddin Abu Bakar	UMNO	Chua Yee Ling	PKR	Haji rahim Ismail	PAS	—N/a	—N/a
N.14	Changkat Jering	Ir. Mohammad Nizar Jamaluddin (PH)	Ahmad Saidi Mohamad Daud	UMNO	Megat Shariffuddin Ibrahim	Amanah	Ustaz Mohd Nordin Jaafar	PAS	Moghanan Manikam	IND
N.15	Trong	Zabri Abd. Wahid (BN)	Jamilah Zakaria	UMNO	Shaharuddin Abdul Rashid	PPBM	Ustaz Muhd Faisal Abd Rahman	PAS	—N/a	—N/a
N.16	Kamunting	Mohammad Zahir Abdul Khalid (BN)	Mohammad Zahir Abdul Khalid	UMNO	Muhd Fadhil Nuruddin	Amanah	Mohd Fakhrudin Abd Aziz	PAS	—N/a	—N/a
N.17	Pokok Assam	Teh Kok Lim (PH)	Lee Li Kuan	MCA	Leow Thye Yih	DAP	—N/a	—N/a	—N/a	—N/a
N.18	Aulong	Leow Thye Tih (PH)	Soo Kay Ping	Gerakan	Nga Kor Ming	DAP	—N/a	—N/a	—N/a	—N/a
N.19	Chenderoh	Zainun Mat Noor (BN)	Zainun Mat Noor	UMNO	Khairul Anuar Musa	PKR	Mohd Farid Faizi Azizan	PAS	—N/a	—N/a
N.20	Lubok Merbau	Siti Salmah Mat Jusak (BN)	Dr. Jurij Jalaluddin	UMNO	Zulkarnine Hashim	PPBM	Azizi Mohamed Ridzuwan	PAS	—N/a	—N/a
N.21	Lintang	Mohd. Zolkafly Harun (BN)	Mohd. Zolkafly Harun	UMNO	Madhi Hassan	PKR	Isran Fahmi Ismail	PAS	—N/a	—N/a
N.22	Jalong	Loh Sze Yee (PH)	Tan Lian Hoe	Gerakan	Loh Sze Yee	DAP	—N/a	—N/a	—N/a	—N/a
N.23	Manjoi	Mohamad Ziad Mohamed Zainal Abidin (BN)	Mohamad Ziad Mohamed Zainal Abidin	UMNO	Asmuni Awi	Amanah	Mohd Hafez Sabri	PAS	—N/a	—N/a
N.24	Hulu Kinta	Aminuddin Md. Hanafiah (BN)	Aminuddin Md. Hanafiah	UMNO	Muhamad Arafat Varisai Mahamad	PKR	Mat Salleh Said	PAS	Murugiah Subramaniam	IND
N.25	Canning	Wong Kah Woh (PH)	Liew Kar Tuan	Gerakan	Jenny Choy	DAP	—N/a	—N/a	—N/a	—N/a
N.26	Tebing Tinggi	Ong Boon Piow (PH)	Tony Khoo Boon Chuan	MCA	Abdul Aziz Bari	DAP	Mazlan Md Isa	PAS	—N/a	—N/a
N.27	Pasir Pinji	Howard Lee Chuan How (PH)	Ng Kai Cheong	MCA	Lee Chuan How	DAP	—N/a	—N/a	—N/a	—N/a
N.28	Bercham	Cheong Chee Khing (PH)	Low Guo Nan	MCA	Ong Boon Piow	DAP	—N/a	—N/a	—N/a	—N/a
N.29	Kepayang	Nga Kor Ming (PH)	Chang Kok Aun	MCA	Ko Chung Sen	DAP	—N/a	—N/a	—N/a	—N/a
N.30	Buntong	Sivasubramaniam Athinarayanan (PH)	Thangarani Thiagarajan	MIC	Sivasubramaniam Athinarayanan	DAP	—N/a	—N/a	R. Rani	PSM
N.31	Jelapang	Teh Hock Ke (PH)	Thankaraj Krishnan	MIC	Cheah Poh Hian	DAP	—N/a	—N/a	M. Sarasvathy	PSM
N.32	Menglembu	Lim Pek Har (PH)	Wong Kam Seng	MCA	Chaw Kam Foon	DAP	—N/a	—N/a	Chin Kwai Leong	PSM
N.33	Tronoh	Yong Choo Kiong (PH)	Yuen Chan How	MCA	Yong Choo Kiong	DAP	—N/a	—N/a	Chin Kwai Heng	PSM
N.34	Bukit Chandan	Maslin Sham Razman (BN)	Maslin Sham Razman	UMNO	Mohamad Imran Abdul Hamid	PKR	Intan Noraini Mohd Basir	PAS	—N/a	—N/a
N.35	Manong	Mohamad Kamil Shafie (BN)	Mohamad Zuraimi Razali	UMNO	Mohamad Isa Jaafar	PPBM	Haji Jamil Dzulkarnain	PAS	—N/a	—N/a
N.36	Pengkalan Baharu	Abd. Manap Hashim (BN)	Abd. Manap Hashim	UMNO	Murad Abdullah	PPBM	Haji Zakaria Hashim	PAS	—N/a	—N/a
N.37	Pantai Remis	Wong May Ing (PH)	Ho Kean Wei	MCA	Wong May Ing	DAP	—N/a	—N/a	—N/a	—N/a
N.38	Astaka	Ngeh Koo Ham (PH)	Teng Keek Soong	MCA	Teoh Yee Chow	DAP	—N/a	—N/a	—N/a	—N/a
N.39	Belanja	Drs. Mohd. Nizar Zakaria (BN)	Khairudin Abu Hanipah	UMNO	Yahanis Yahya	PPBM	Mohd Zahid Abu Bakar	PAS	—N/a	—N/a
N.40	Bota	Nasarudin Hashim (BN)	Khairul Shahril Mohamed	UMNO	Azrul Hakkim Azhar	PPBM	Ustaz Muhamad Ismi Mat Taib	PAS	—N/a	—N/a
N.41	Malim Nawar	Leong Cheok Keng (PH)	Chang Gwo Chyang	MCA	Leong Cheok Keng	DAP	—N/a	—N/a	K.S. Bawani	PSM
N.42	Keranji	Chen Fook Chye (PH)	Daniel Wa Wai How	MCA	Chang Zhemin	DAP	—N/a	—N/a	—N/a	—N/a
N.43	Tualang Sekah	Nolee Ashilin Mohamed Radzi (BN)	Nolee Ashilin Mohammed Radzi	UMNO	Mohd Azlan Helmi	PKR	Mohd Sofian Haji Rejab	PAS	—N/a	—N/a
N.44	Sungai Rapat	Radzi Zainon (GS)	Hamzah Mohd. Kasim	UMNO	Mohammad Nizar Jamaluddin	Amanah	Radzi Zainon	PAS	—N/a	—N/a
N.45	Simpang Pulai	Tan Kar Hing (PH)	Liew Yee Lin	MCA	Tan Kar Hing	PKR	—N/a	—N/a	—N/a	—N/a
N.46	Teja	Chang Lih Kang (PH)	Chang Chun Cheun	MCA	Ng Shy Ching	PKR	Mokhthar Abdullah	PAS	—N/a	—N/a
N.47	Chenderiang	Dr. Mah Hang Soon (BN)	Chong Shin Heng	MCA	Ahmad Faizal Azumu	PPBM	Nordin Hassan	PAS	—N/a	—N/a
N.48	Ayer Kuning	Samsudin Abu Hassan (BN)	Samsudin Abu Hassan	UMNO	Tan Seng Toh	Amanah	Salmah Ab Latif	PAS	—N/a	—N/a
N.49	Sungai Manik	Zainol Fadzi Paharudin (BN)	Zainol Fadzi Paharudin	UMNO	Mohamad Maharani Md Tasi	PKR	Mohamed Yusoff Abdullah	PAS	Mustapa Kamal Maulut	BERJASA
N.50	Kampong Gajah	Abdullah Fauzi Ahmad Razali (BN)	Dr. Wan Norashikin Wan Nordin	UMNO	Zaiton Latiff	Amanah	Mustafa Shaari	PAS	—N/a	—N/a
N.51	Pasir Panjang	Rashidi Ibrahim (BN)	Rashidi Ibrahim	UMNO	Yahaya Mat Nor	Amanah	Rohawati Abidin	PAS	—N/a	—N/a
N.52	Pangkor	Dr. Zambry Abdul Kadir (BN)	Dr. Zambry Abdul Kadir	UMNO	Nordin Ahmad Ismail	PPBM	Zainal Abidin Saad	PAS	—N/a	—N/a
N.53	Rungkup	Shahrul Zaman Yahya (BN)	Shahrul Zaman Yahya	UMNO	Hatim Musa	Amanah	Mohd. Mohkheri Jalil	PAS	—N/a	—N/a
N.54	Hutan Melintang	Kesavan Subramaniam (PH)	Khairuddin Tarmizi	UMNO	Manivannan Gowindasamy	PKR	Mohd. Misbahul Munir Masduki	PAS	—N/a	—N/a
N.55	Pasir Bedamar	Terence Naidu (PH)	Kong Sun Chin	MCA	Terence Naidu	DAP	Kumaresan Shamugam	PAS	—N/a	—N/a
N.56	Changkat Jong	Mohd. Azhar Jamaluddin (BN)	Mohd. Azhar Jamaluddin	UMNO	Muhammad Faizul Mohamed Ismail	PPBM	Mohd Azhar Mohd Rafiei	PAS	—N/a	—N/a
N.57	Sungkai	Sivanesan Achalingam (PH)	Elango Vadil Veloo	MIC	Sivanesan Achalingam	DAP	Applasamy Jetakiah	PAS	—N/a	—N/a
N.58	Slim	Mohd. Khusairi Abu Talib (BN)	Mohd. Khusairi Abd Talib	UMNO	Mohd. Amran Ibrahim	PPBM	Muhammad Zulfadli Zainal	PAS	—N/a	—N/a
N.59	Behrang	Rusnah Kassim (BN)	Rusnah Kassim	UMNO	Aminuddin Zulkipli	Amanah	Syed Zamzuri Syed Nengah	PAS	—N/a	—N/a

=== Pahang (42) ===
State constituency		Incumbent MLA	Political parties							
State constituency		Incumbent MLA	Barisan Nasional		Pakatan Harapan		Gagasan Sejahtera		Other parties	
State constituency		Incumbent MLA	Candidate Name	Party	Candidate Name	Party	Candidate Name	Party	Candidate Name	Party
N.01	Tanah Rata	Leong Ngah Ngah (PH)	Leong Tak Man	MCA	Chong Yoke Kong	DAP	Kumar Silambaram	PAS	—N/a	—N/a
N.02	Jelai	Wan Rosdy Wan Ismail (BN)	Wan Rosdy Wan Ismail	UMNO	Abdul Rasid Mohamed Ali	PPBM	Abdul Karim Nor	PAS	Mat Nor Ayat	PSM
N.03	Padang Tengku	Mustapa Long (BN)	Mustapa Long	UMNO	Alias Abdul Rahman	PPBM	Roslan Harun	PAS	—N/a	—N/a
N.04	Cheka	Fong Kong Fuee (BN)	Lee Ah Wong	MCA	Rasid Muhamad	PKR	Saludin Endol	PAS	—N/a	—N/a
N.05	Benta	Ir. Mohd. Soffi Abdul Razak (BN)	Mohd Soffi Abd Razak	UMNO	Sabaruddin Mohd Yassim	PKR	Annuar Kassim	PAS	—N/a	—N/a
N.06	Batu Talam	Abd. Aziz Mat Kiram (BN)	Abd Aziz Mat Kiram	UMNO	Dasimah Zainudin	PKR	Tengku Abdul Rahman Tengku Ja'afar	PAS	—N/a	—N/a
N.07	Tras	Choong Siew Onn (PH)	Ng Leap Pong	MCA	Chow Yu Hui	DAP	Chin Choy Hee	PAS	—N/a	—N/a
N.08	Dong	Shahiruddin Ab. Moin (BN)	Shahiruddin Ab Moin	UMNO	Hamzah Jaafar	AMANAH	Bedu Rahim Ismail	PAS	—N/a	—N/a
N.09	Tahan	Wan Amizan Wan Abdul Razak (BN)	Wan Amizan Wan Abd Razak	UMNO	Nordin Samat	PPBM	Mohd Zakhwan Ahmad Badarddin	PAS	—N/a	—N/a
N.10	Damak	Lau Lee (BN)	Lim Chong Ly	MCA	Wong Chun Yuan	PKR	Zuridan Mohd Daud	PAS	—N/a	—N/a
N.11	Pulau Tawar	Dr. Ahmad Shukri Ismail (BN)	Nazri Ngah	UMNO	Jamaluddin Abdul Rahim	PKR	Ahmad Naawi Samah	PAS	—N/a	—N/a
N.12	Beserah	Andansura Rabu (GS)	Suhaimi Jusoh	UMNO	Zulkifli Mohamed	PKR	Andansura Rabu	PAS	—N/a	—N/a
N.13	Semambu	Lee Chean Chung (PH)	Quek Tai Seong	MCA	Lee Chean Chung	PKR	Mohd Yusof Hashin	PAS	—N/a	—N/a
N.14	Teruntum	Sim Chon Siang (PH)	Tee Choon Ser	MCA	Sim Chon Siang	PKR	Azizah Mohd Ali	PAS	—N/a	—N/a
N.15	Tanjung Lumpur	Rosli Abdul Jabar (GS)	T. Zulkifly T. Ahmad	UMNO	Sabrina Md. Yusoff	AMANAH	Rosli Abdul Jabar	PAS	—N/a	—N/a
N.16	Inderapura	Shafik Fauzan Sharif (BN)	Shafik Fauzan Sharif	UMNO	Fakhrul Anuar Zulkawi	PKR	Wan Maseri Wan Mohd	PAS	—N/a	—N/a
N.17	Sungai Lembing	Md. Sohaimi Mohamed Shah (BN)	Md Sohaimi Mohamed Shah	UMNO	Fauzi Abdul Rahman	PKR	Mohamad Hazmi Dibok	PAS	—N/a	—N/a
N.18	Lepar	Vacant	Abd Rahim Muda	UMNO	Nur Ad-din Ibrahim	AMANAH	Mohd Nor Hisam Muhammad	PAS	—N/a	—N/a
N.19	Panching	Mohd. Zaili Besar (BN)	Mohd Zaili Besar	UMNO	Kamarzaman Mohamed Yunus	PKR	Mohd Tarmizi Yahaya	PAS	Benzin Dagok	IND
N.20	Pulau Manis	Khairuddin Mahmud (BN)	Khairuddin Mahmud	UMNO	Abu Bakar Lebai Sudin	DAP	Zainuddin Noh	PAS	—N/a	—N/a
N.21	Peramu Jaya	Sh. Mohamed Puzi Sh. Ali (BN)	Sh. Mohamed Puzi Sh. Ali	UMNO	Salim Abdul Majid	PPBM	Abu Kassim Manaf	PAS	—N/a	—N/a
N.22	Bebar	Mohammad Fakhruddin Mohd. Ariff (BN)	Mohammad Fakhruddin Mohd Ariff	UMNO	Afif Syairol Abdul Rahman	PPBM	Mohd Nazhar Othman	PAS	—N/a	—N/a
N.23	Chini	Abu Bakar Harun (BN)	Abu Bakar Harun	UMNO	Mohd Razali Ithnain	PPBM	Mohd Fadhil Noor Abdul Karim	PAS	—N/a	—N/a
N.24	Luit	Nurhidayah Mohd. Shahami (BN)	Nurhidayah Mohd Shahaimi	UMNO	Rosli Amin	PKR	Mohd Sofian Abd Jalil	PAS	—N/a	—N/a
N.25	Kuala Sentul	Shahaniza Shamsuddin (BN)	Shahaniza Shamsuddin	UMNO	Bostamin Bakar	PKR	Fazil Azmi Nadzri	PAS	—N/a	—N/a
N.26	Chenor	Mohamed Arifin Awang Ismail (BN)	Mohamed Arifin Awang Ismail	UMNO	Zuliana Mohamed	PKR	Mujjibur Rahman Ishak	PAS	—N/a	—N/a
N.27	Jenderak	Mohamed Jaafar (BN)	Mohamed Jaafar	UMNO	Faziah Baharom	PPBM	Abdullah Yusoh	PAS	—N/a	—N/a
N.28	Kerdau	Syed Ibrahim Syed Ahmad (BN)	Syed Ibrahim Syed Ahmad	UMNO	Adnan Abdul Manaf	AMANAH	Aireroshairi Roslan	PAS	—N/a	—N/a
N.29	Jengka	Wan Salman Wan Ismail (BN)	Wan Salman Wan Ismail	UMNO	Jalani Ludin	AMANAH	Shahril Azman Abd Halim	PAS	—N/a	—N/a
N.30	Mentakab	Tengku Zulpuri Shah Raja Puji (PH)	Wong Tat Chee	MCA	Woo Chee Wan	DAP	Abirerah Awang Chik	PAS	Chuah Boon Seong	IND
N.31	Lanchang	Mohd. Sharkar Shamsuddin (BN)	Mohd Sharkar Shamsuddin	UMNO	Abas Awang	PKR	Hasan Omar	PAS	Mohd Khaidir Ahmad	IND
N.32	Kuala Semantan	Syed Hamid Syed Mohamed (PH)	Nor Azmi Mat Ludin	UMNO	Syed Hamid Syed Mohamed	AMANAH	Hassanuddin Salim	PAS	—N/a	—N/a
N.33	Bilut	Chow Yu Hui (PH)	Poo Mun Hoong	MCA	Lee Chin Chen	DAP	Mohd Zamri Nong	PAS	—N/a	—N/a
N.34	Ketari	Lee Chin Chen (PH)	Lau Hoi Keong	GERAKAN	Syefura Othman	DAP	Roslan Md Esa	PAS	—N/a	—N/a
N.35	Sabai	Kamache Doray Rajoo (PH)	Goonasakaren Raman	MIC	Kamache Doray Rajoo	DAP	Mohd Khairuddin Abdullah	PAS	Karunaneethi Thangavel	IND
N.36	Pelangai	Adnan Yaakob (BN)	Adnan Yaakob	UMNO	Norhaizan Abu Hasan	AMANAH	Zaharim Osman	PAS	—N/a	—N/a
N.37	Guai	Norolazali Sulaiman (BN)	Norolazali Sulaiman	UMNO	Ahmad Majdi Fauzi Abdul Aziz	AMANAH	Mohd Shahrul Mohamed	PAS	—N/a	—N/a
N.38	Triang	Leong Yu Man (PH)	Tan Tin Loon	GERAKAN	Leong Yu Man	PKR	—N/a	—N/a	—N/a	—N/a
N.39	Kemayan	Mohd. Fadil Osman (BN)	Mohd Fadil Osman	UMNO	Manolan Mohamad	PKR	Md Yusof Che Din	PAS	—N/a	—N/a
N.40	Bukit Ibam	Wan Kadri Wan Mahusain (BN)	Samshiah Arshad	UMNO	Zulkarnain Mohamad Ridzuan	PPBM	Nazri Ahmad	PAS	—N/a	—N/a
N.41	Muadzam Shah	Maznah Mazlan (BN)	Razali Kassim	UMNO	Osman Abu Bakar	PPBM	Ramli Awang Ahmat	PAS	—N/a	—N/a
N.42	Tioman	Mohd. Johari Hussain (BN)	Mohd Johari Hussain	UMNO	Ahmad Sazili Mohd. Nor	AMANAH	Md Yunus Ramli	PAS	Mohd Zolfakar Taib	IND

=== Selangor (56) ===
State constituency		Incumbent MLA	Political parties							
State constituency		Incumbent MLA	Pakatan Harapan		Gagasan Sejahtera		Barisan Nasional		Other parties/Ind	
State constituency		Incumbent MLA	Candidate Name	Party	Candidate Name	Party	Candidate Name	Party	Candidate Name	Party
N.01	Sungai Air Tawar	Vacant	Mohd. Hamizar Sulaiman	PPBM	Zamri Yahya	PAS	Rizam Ismail	UMNO	—N/a	—N/a
N.02	Sabak	Sallehen Mukhyi (GS)	Ahmad Mustain Othman	Amanah	Sallehen Mukhyi	PAS	Sallehudin Mohd Iskan	UMNO	—N/a	—N/a
N.03	Sungai Panjang	Budiman Mohd Zohdi (BN)	Mariam Abdul Rashid	Amanah	Mohd Razali Shaari	PAS	Imran Tamrin	UMNO	—N/a	—N/a
N.04	Sekinchan	Ng Suee Lim (PH)	Ng Suee Lim	DAP	Mohd Fazlin Taslimin	PAS	Lee Yee Yuan	MCA	—N/a	—N/a
N.05	Hulu Bernam	Rosni Sohar (BN)	Mohd. Amran Sakir	Amanah	Mohammed Salleh Ri	PAS	Rosni Sohar	UMNO	—N/a	—N/a
N.06	Kuala Kubu Baharu	Lee Kee Hiong (PH)	Lee Kee Hiong	DAP	Naharudin Abd Rashid	PAS	Wong Koon Mun	MCA	—N/a	—N/a
N.07	Batang Kali	Mat Nadzari Ahmad Dahlan (BN)	Harumaini Omar	PPBM	Mohd Hasnizan Harun	PAS	Mat Nadzari Ahmad Dahlan	UMNO	—N/a	—N/a
N.08	Sungai Burong	Mohd Shamsudin Lias (BN)	Mohd. Tarmizi Lazim	PPBM	Mohd. Zamri Mohd. Zainuldin	PAS	Mohd. Shamsudin Lias	UMNO	—N/a	—N/a
N.09	Permatang	Sulaiman Abdul Razak (BN)	Rozana Zainal Abidin	PKR	Muhammad Jafaruddin Sheik Daud	PAS	Sulaiman Abdul Razak	UMNO	—N/a	—N/a
N.10	Bukit Melawati	Jakiran Jacomah (BN)	Juwairiya Zulkifli	PKR	Muhammad Rashid Muhammad Kassim	PAS	Jakiran Jacomah	UMNO	—N/a	—N/a
N.11	Ijok	Idris Ahmad (PH)	Idris Ahmad	PKR	Jefri Mejan	Ikatan	K. Parthiban	MIC	Kumaran Tamil Dassen	PRM
N.12	Jeram	Amiruddin Setro (BN)	Mohd. Shaid Rosli	PPBM	Mohd Noor Mohd Shahar	PAS	Zahar Azlan Ariffin	UMNO	—N/a	—N/a
N.13	Kuang	Abdul Shukur Idrus (BN)	Sallehudin Amiruddin	PPBM	Mohd Fauzan Madzlan	PAS	Abdul Shukur Idrus	UMNO	Mohd Rafie Mohammad Arif	PRM
N.14	Rawang	Gan Pei Nei (PH)	Chua Wei Kiat	PKR	Kong Tuck Wah	PAS	Chan Wun Hoong	MCA	Azman Mohd Noor	IND
N.15	Taman Templer	Zaidy Abdul Talib (GS)	Mohd Sany Hamzan	Amanah	Zaidy Abdul Talib	PAS	Md Nasir Ibrahim	UMNO	Koh Swe Yong	PRM
N.15	Taman Templer	Zaidy Abdul Talib (GS)	Mohd Sany Hamzan	Amanah	Zaidy Abdul Talib	PAS	Md Nasir Ibrahim	UMNO	Rajandran Batumalai	IND
N.16	Sungai Tua	Amirudin Shari (PH)	Amirudin Shari	PKR	Mohammad Ibrahim	PAS	N. Rawisandran	MIC	Badrul Hisam Md Zin	IND
N.17	Gombak Setia	Hasbullah Mohd Ridzwan (GS)	Hilman Idham	PKR	Hasbullah Mohd Ridzwan	PAS	Megat Zulkarnain Omardin	UMNO	—N/a	—N/a
N.18	Hulu Kelang	Saari Sungib (PH)	Saari Sungib	Amanah	Kamalulhysham Mohd Suhut	PAS	Ismail Ahmad	UMNO	—N/a	—N/a
N.19	Bukit Antarabangsa	Mohamed Azmin Ali (PH)	Mohamed Azmin Ali	PKR	Syarifah Haslizah Syed Ariffin	PAS	Salwa Yunus	UMNO	Ahmad Kamarudin	PRM
N.19	Bukit Antarabangsa	Mohamed Azmin Ali (PH)	Mohamed Azmin Ali	PKR	Syarifah Haslizah Syed Ariffin	PAS	Salwa Yunus	UMNO	Azwan Ali	IND
N.20	Lembah Jaya	Khasim Abdul Aziz (GS)	Haniza Mohamed Talha	PKR	Khasim Abdul Aziz	PAS	Muhamad Nizam Shith	UMNO	Norizwan Mohamed	PRM
N.21	Pandan Indah	Iskandar Abdul Samad (GS)	Izham Hashim	Amanah	Iskandar Abdul Samad	PAS	Mohd Haniff Koslan	UMNO	—N/a	—N/a
N.22	Teratai	Tiew Way Keng (PH)	Lai Wai Chong	DAP	Mohd Irman Abdul Wahab	PAS	Liew Pok Boon	Gerakan	Jenice Lee Ying Ha	PRM
N.23	Dusun Tua	Razaly Hassan (GS)	Edry Faizal Eddy Yusof	DAP	Razaly Hassan	PAS	Mohd Zin Isa	UMNO	—N/a	—N/a
N.24	Semenyih	Johan Abd Aziz (BN)	Bakhtiar Mohd Nor	PPBM	Mad Shahmidur Mat Kosim	PAS	Johan Abd Aziz	UMNO	Arutchelvan Subramaniams	PSM
N.25	Kajang	Wan Azizah Wan Ismail (PH)	Hee Loy Sian	PKR	Zaiton Ahmad	PAS	Teh Yeow Meng	MCA	Dennis Wan Jinn Woei	PRM
N.26	Sungai Ramal	Mohd Shafie Ngah (GS)	Mazwan Johar	Amanah	Nushi Mahfodz	PAS	Abdul Rahim Mohd Amin	UMNO	—N/a	—N/a
N.27	Balakong	Eddie Ng Tien Chee (PH)	Eddie Ng Tien Chee	DAP	Mohamad Ibrahim Ghazali	PAS	Lim Chin Wah	MCA	—N/a	—N/a
N.28	Seri Kembangan	Ean Yong Hian Wah (PH)	Ean Yong Hian Wah	DAP	—N/a	—N/a	Chang Toong Woh	MCA	—N/a	—N/a
N.29	Seri Serdang	Noor Hanim Ismail (GS)	Siti Mariah Mahmud	Amanah	Noor Hanim Ismail	PAS	Mohammad Satim Diman	UMNO	—N/a	—N/a
N.30	Kinrara	Ng Sze Han (PH)	Ng Sze Han	DAP	Lim Ying Ran	Ikatan	Chiew Kai Heng	MCA	—N/a	—N/a
N.31	Subang Jaya	Hannah Yeoh Tseow Suan (PH)	Michelle Ng Mei Sze	DAP	—N/a	—N/a	Chong Ah Watt	MCA	Toh Sin Wah	IND
N.32	Seri Setia	Nik Nazmi Nik Ahmad (PH)	Shaharuddin Badarudin	PKR	Mohd Ghazali Daud	PAS	Yusoff M. Haniff	UMNO	Vigneswaran Subramaniam	IND
N.33	Taman Medan	Haniza Mohamed Talha (PH)	Syamsul Firdaus Mohamed Supri	PKR	Ariffin Mahaiyuddin	PAS	Abdul Mutalif Abd Rahim	UMNO	—N/a	—N/a
N.34	Bukit Gasing	Rajiv Rishyakaran (PH)	Rajiv Rishyakaran	DAP	David Sew Kah Heng	Ikatan	Chai Ko Thing	Gerakan	—N/a	—N/a
N.35	Kampung Tunku	Lau Weng San (PH)	Lim Yi Wei	DAP	—N/a	—N/a	Tam Gim Tuan	MCA	—N/a	—N/a
N.36	Bandar Utama	Yeo Bee Yin (PH)	Jamaliah Jamaluddin	DAP	—N/a	—N/a	Ch'ng Soo Chau	MCA	Chong Fook Meng	IND
N.37	Bukit Lanjan	Elizabeth Wong Keat Ping (PH)	Elizabeth Wong Keat Ping	PKR	—N/a	—N/a	Syed Abdul Razak Syed Long Alsagof	Gerakan	—N/a	—N/a
N.38	Paya Jaras	Mohd Khairuddin Othman (GS)	Mohd Khairuddin Othman	PKR	Hanafi Zulkapli	PAS	Zein Isma Ismail	UMNO	—N/a	—N/a
N.39	Kota Damansara	Halimaton Saadiah Bohan (BN)	Shatiri Mansor	PKR	Siti Rohaya Ahad	PAS	Halimaton Saadiah Bohan	UMNO	Sivarajan Arumugam	PSM
N.40	Kota Anggerik	Yaakob Sapari (PH)	Najwan Halimi	PKR	Ahmad Dusuki Abd Rani	PAS	Jumaeah Masdi	UMNO	—N/a	—N/a
N.41	Batu Tiga	Rodziah Ismail (PH)	Rodziah Ismail	PKR	Abdul Halim Omar	PAS	Ahmad Mua'adzam Shah Ya'akop	UMNO	—N/a	—N/a
N.42	Meru	Abd Rani Osman (GS)	Mohd. Fakhrulrazi Mohd Mokhtar	Amanah	Noor Najhan Mohd Salleh	PAS	Khairul Anuar Saimun	UMNO	Shee Chee Weng	IND
N.42	Meru	Abd Rani Osman (GS)	Mohd. Fakhrulrazi Mohd Mokhtar	Amanah	Noor Najhan Mohd Salleh	PAS	Khairul Anuar Saimun	UMNO	Manikavasagam Sundaram	PRM
N.43	Sementa	Daroyah Alwi (PH)	Daroyah Alwi	PKR	Wan Hasrina Wan Hassan	PAS	Saroni Judi	UMNO	Gandhi Nagamuthu	PRM
N.44	Selat Klang	Halimah Ali (GS)	Abdul Rashid Asari	PPBM	Halimah Ali	PAS	Mohd Khairi Hussin	UMNO	Jeichandran Wadivelu	PRM
N.44	Selat Klang	Halimah Ali (GS)	Abdul Rashid Asari	PPBM	Halimah Ali	PAS	Mohd Khairi Hussin	UMNO	Zainal Azwar Kamaruddin	IND
N.45	Bandar Baru Klang	Teng Chang Khim (PH)	Teng Chang Khim	DAP	—N/a	—N/a	Teoh Kah Yeong	MCA	—N/a	—N/a
N.46	Pelabuhan Klang	Abdul Khalid Ibrahim (IND)	Azmizam Zaman Huri	PKR	Khalid Nayan	PAS	Seikh Rajesh Seikh Ahmad	UMNO	Shanmugasundram Veerappan	PSM
N.47	Pandamaran	Eric Tan Pok Shyong (PH)	Leong Tuck Chee	DAP	G.S. Santokh Singh	Ikatan	Tee Hooi Ling	MCA	—N/a	—N/a
N.48	Sentosa	Ganabatirau Veraman (PH)	Gunarajah George	PKR	Rajan Manikesavan	PAS	R. Subramaniam	MIC	Sundarajoo A.Periasamy	IND
N.48	Sentosa	Ganabatirau Veraman (PH)	Gunarajah George	PKR	Rajan Manikesavan	PAS	R. Subramaniam	MIC	M. Telai Amblam	PRM
N.49	Sungai Kandis	Xavier Jayakumar Arulanandam (PH)	Mat Shuhaimi Shafiei	PKR	Mohd Yusof Abdullah	PAS	Kamaruzzaman Johari	UMNO	Hanafiah Husin	PRM
N.50	Kota Kemuning	Mat Shuhaimi Shafiei (PH)	Ganabatirau Veraman	DAP	Burhan Adnan	PAS	Tiew Hock Huat	Gerakan	Abdul Razak Ismail	PSM
N.50	Kota Kemuning	Mat Shuhaimi Shafiei (PH)	Ganabatirau Veraman	DAP	Burhan Adnan	PAS	Tiew Hock Huat	Gerakan	Rajasekaran Soundaparandy	IND
N.51	Sijangkang	Ahmad Yunus Hairi (GS)	Mohd Hamidi Abu Bakar	PPBM	Ahmad Yunus Hairi	PAS	Sulaiman Mohd Karli	UMNO	—N/a	—N/a
N.52	Banting	Loh Chee Heng (IND)	Lau Weng San	DAP	—N/a	—N/a	Ng Siok Hwa	MCA	Tan Choon Swee	PRM
N.53	Morib	Hasnul Baharuddin (PH)	Hasnul Baharuddin	Amanah	Mohammad Sallehuddin Hafiz	PAS	Rozana Kamarulzaman	UMNO	—N/a	—N/a
N.54	Tanjong Sepat	Mohd Haslin Hassan (GS)	Borhan Aman Shah	PKR	Mohd Haslin Hassan	PAS	Karim Mansor	UMNO	—N/a	—N/a
N.55	Dengkil	Shahrum Mohd Sharif (BN)	Adhif Syan Abdullah	PPBM	Yusmi Haniff Ariffin	PAS	Shahrum Mohd Sharif	UMNO	—N/a	—N/a
N.56	Sungai Pelek	Lai Nyuk Lan (PH)	Ronnie Liu	DAP	Rohaya Mohd Shahir	PAS	Ng Chok Sin	MCA	Harry Arul Raj Krishnan	PAP

=== Negeri Sembilan (36) ===
State constituency		Incumbent MLA	Political parties							
State constituency		Incumbent MLA	Barisan Nasional		Pakatan Harapan		Gagasan Sejahtera		Other parties	
State constituency		Incumbent MLA	Candidate Name	Party	Candidate Name	Party	Candidate Name	Party	Candidate Name	Party
N.01	Chennah	Anthony Loke Siew Fook (PH)	Seet Tee Gee	MCA	Anthony Loke Siew Fook	DAP	Jamalus Mansor	PAS	—N/a	—N/a
N.02	Pertang	Jalaluddin Alias (BN)	Noor Azmi Yusof	UMNO	Osman Mohd. Dusa	PPBM	Hamran Abu Hasan	PAS	—N/a	—N/a
N.03	Sungai Lui	Mohd. Razi Mohd. Ali (BN)	Mohd. Razi Mohd. Ali	UMNO	Zainal Fikri Abd. Kadir	PKR	Abd. Karim Shahimi Abd. Razak	PAS	—N/a	—N/a
N.04	Klawang	Yunus Rahmat (BN)	Baharudin Jali	UMNO	Bakri Sawir	AMANAH	Mazly Yasin	PAS	—N/a	—N/a
N.05	Serting	Shamsulkahar Mohd. Deli (BN)	Shamsulkahar Mohd. Deli	UMNO	Abd. Rahman Ramli	AMANAH	Muhammad Al Zukri Muhamad Yasin	PAS	—N/a	—N/a
N.06	Palong	Lilah Yasin (BN)	Mustapha Nagoor	UMNO	Abdul Rahman Jaafar	PKR	Masdi Musa	PAS	—N/a	—N/a
N.07	Jeram Padang	Manickam Letchuman (BN)	Manickam Letchuman	MIC	S. Musliadi Sabtu	PKR	Mohd. Fairuz Mohd. Isa	PAS	—N/a	—N/a
N.08	Bahau	Chew Seh Yong (PH)	Chong Wan Yu	MCA	Teo Kok Seong	DAP	Mustafar Bakri Abd. Aziz	PAS	—N/a	—N/a
N.09	Lenggeng	Vacant	Mazalan Maarop	UMNO	Suhaimi Kassim	AMANAH	Mohammad Ghazali Abu Bakar	PAS	—N/a	—N/a
N.10	Nilai	Arul Kumar Jambunathan (PH)	Leaw Kok Chan	MCA	Arul Kumar Jambunanthan	DAP	Mohd. Abu Zarim Abdul Rahman	PAS	—N/a	—N/a
N.11	Lobak	Siew Kim Leong (PH)	Lim Kok Kian	MCA	Chew Seh Yong	DAP	—N/a	—N/a	Balamurugan Sanmugam	PAP
N.12	Temiang	Ng Chin Tsai (PH)	Siow Koi Voon	MCA	Ng Chin Tsai	DAP	Yau Con Seng	PAS	—N/a	—N/a
N.13	Sikamat	Aminuddin Harun (PH)	Syamsul Amri Ismail	UMNO	Aminuddin Harun	PKR	Rahim Yusof	PAS	Bujang Abu	IND
N.14	Ampangan	Abu Ubaidah Redza (BN)	Abu Ubaidah Redza	UMNO	Dr. Mohamad Rafie Abdul Malek	PKR	Mustaffa Daharun	PAS	—N/a	—N/a
N.15	Juasseh	Mohammad Razi Kail (BN)	Ismail Lasim	UMNO	Rosli Omar	PKR	Hassan Mohamed	PAS	—N/a	—N/a
N.16	Seri Menanti	Abd. Samad Ibrahim (BN)	Abd. Samad Ibrahim	UMNO	Jamali Salam	PKR	Rafiei Mustapha	PAS	—N/a	—N/a
N.17	Senaling	Ismail Lasim (BN)	Adnan Abu Hassan	UMNO	Md. Rais Basiron	AMANAH	Fazilah Abu Samah	PAS	—N/a	—N/a
N.18	Pilah	Norhayati Omar (BN)	Norhayati Omar	UMNO	Mohamad Nadzaruddin Sabtu	PKR	Ahmad Fadzil Othman	PAS	—N/a	—N/a
N.19	Johol	Abu Samah Mahat (BN)	Saiful Yazan Sulaiman	UMNO	Zulkefly Mohamad Omar	AMANAH	Kamarudin Tahir	PAS	—N/a	—N/a
N.20	Labu	Hasim Rusdi (BN)	Hasim Rusdi	UMNO	Ismail Ahmad	PKR	Khairul Anwar Wafa	PAS	David Dass Aseerpatham	PAP
N.21	Bukit Kepayang	Cha Kee Chin (PH)	Mak Kah Keong	MCA	Nicole Tan Lee Koon	DAP	—N/a	—N/a	—N/a	—N/a
N.22	Rahang	Mary Josephine Pritam Singh (PH)	Yap Siok Moy	MCA	Mary Josephine Pritam Singh	DAP	—N/a	—N/a	Saraswathy Paragazum	PAP
N.23	Mambau	Yap Yew Weng (PH)	Dafney Ho	MCA	Yap Yew Weng	DAP	—N/a	—N/a	Parimala Devi Theyagason	PAP
N.24	Seremban Jaya	Gunasekaren Palasamy (PH)	Choong Vee Hing	MCA	Gunasekaren Palasamy	DAP	—N/a	—N/a	Sagaya Rajan Xavier	PAP
N.25	Paroi	Mohd. Ghazali Wahid (BN)	Mohd. Ghazali Wahid	UMNO	Mohamad Taufek Abdul Ghani	AMANAH	Masita Mohamed Ali	PAS	—N/a	—N/a
N.26	Chembong	Zaifulbahri Idris (BN)	Zaifulbahri Idris	UMNO	Azizan Marzuki	PPBM	Rosmin Adam	PAS	—N/a	—N/a
N.27	Rantau	Mohamad Hasan (BN)	Mohamad Hasan	UMNO	—N/a	—N/a	—N/a	—N/a	—N/a	—N/a
N.28	Kota	Dr. Awaludin Said (BN)	Dr. Awaludin Said	UMNO	Sahrizal Masrudin	AMANAH	Ishak Omar	PAS	—N/a	—N/a
N.29	Chuah	Chai Tong Chai (PH)	Dr. King Lim Chin Fui	MCA	Michael Yek Diew Ching	DAP	—N/a	—N/a	—N/a	—N/a
N.30	Lukut	Ean Yong Tin Sin (PH)	Yeong Kun You	MCA	Choo Ken Hwa	DAP	—N/a	—N/a	—N/a	—N/a
N.31	Bagan Pinang	Tun Hairuddin Abu Bakar (BN)	Tun Hairuddin Abu Bakar	UMNO	Mohd. Ibrahim Khan Amanula Khan	PKR	—N/a	—N/a	—N/a	—N/a
N.32	Linggi	Abd. Rahman Mohd. Redza (BN)	Abd. Rahman Mohd. Redza	UMNO	Rusli Abdullah	PKR	Rizal Ishak	PAS	—N/a	—N/a
N.33	Sri Tanjung	Ravi Munusamy (PH)	Thinalan Rajagopalu	MIC	Ravi Munusamy	DAP	Kamarol Ridzuan Mohd. Zain	PAS	—N/a	—N/a
N.34	Gemas	Abdul Razak Said (BN)	Abdul Razak Said	UMNO	Baharuddin Arif Siri	PKR	Maj. (Rtd.) Abdul Halim Abu Bakar	PAS	—N/a	—N/a
N.35	Gemencheh	Mohd. Isam Mohd. Isa (BN)	Mohd. Isam Mohd. Isa	UMNO	Saiful Adly Abd. Wahab	PKR	Ishak Maasin	PAS	—N/a	—N/a
N.36	Repah	Veerapan Superamaniam (PH)	Koh Kim Swee	MCA	Veerapan Superamanian	DAP	Abdul Razakek Abdul Rahim	PAS	—N/a	—N/a

=== Malacca (28) ===
State constituency		Incumbent MLA	Political parties							
State constituency		Incumbent MLA	Barisan Nasional		Pakatan Harapan		Gagasan Sejahtera		Other parties	
State constituency		Incumbent MLA	Candidate Name	Party	Candidate Name	Party	Candidate Name	Party	Candidate Name	Party
N.01	Kuala Linggi	Ismail Othman (BN)	Ismail Othman	UMNO	Hasmorni Tamby	PKR	Azmi Sambul	PAS	—N/a	—N/a
N.02	Tanjung Bidara	Md Rawi Mahmud (BN)	Md Rawi Mahmud	UMNO	Halim Bachik	PKR	Imran Abdul Rahman	PAS	—N/a	—N/a
N.03	Ayer Limau	Amirudin Yusof (BN)	Amirudin Yusof	UMNO	Ruslin Hasan	PPBM	Jamarudin Ahmad	PAS	—N/a	—N/a
N.04	Lendu	Sulaiman Md. Ali (BN)	Sulaiman Md Ali	UMNO	Riduan Affandi Abu Bakar	PPBM	Arshad Mohamad Som	PAS	—N/a	—N/a
N.05	Taboh Naning	Latipah Omar (BN)	Latipah Omar	UMNO	Zairi Suboh	Amanah	Asri Shaik Abdul Aziz	PAS	—N/a	—N/a
N.06	Rembia	Norpipah Abdol (BN)	Norpipah Abdol	UMNO	Muhammad Jailani Khamis	PKR	Mohammad Rashidi Abd Razak	PAS	—N/a	—N/a
N.07	Gadek	Mahadevan Sanacy (BN)	P. Panirchelvam	MIC	G. Saminathan	DAP	Emransyah Ismail	PAS	—N/a	—N/a
N.08	Machap Jaya	Lai Meng Chong (BN)	Koh Nai Kwong	MCA	Ginie Lim Siew Lin	PKR	Wan Zahidi Wan Ismail	PAS	—N/a	—N/a
N.09	Durian Tunggal	Ab. Wahab Ab. Latip (BN)	Ab Wahab Ab Latip	UMNO	Mohd Sofi Wahab	Amanah	Mohsin Ibrahim	PAS	—N/a	—N/a
N.10	Asahan	Abdul Ghafar Atan (BN)	Abdul Ghafar Atan	UMNO	Zamzuri Ariffin	PPBM	Azlan Maddin	PAS	—N/a	—N/a
N.11	Sungai Udang	Idris Haron (BN)	Idris Haron	UMNO	Mohd Lokman Abdul Gani	PKR	—N/a	—N/a	—N/a	—N/a
N.12	Pantai Kundor	Ab. Rahaman Ab. Karim (BN)	Nor Azman Hassan	UMNO	Juhari Osman	Amanah	Abdul Halim Maidin	PAS	—N/a	—N/a
N.13	Paya Rumput	Sazali Muhd. Din (BN)	Abu Bakar Mohamad Diah	UMNO	Mohd. Rafiq Naizamohideen	PPBM	Rafie Ahmad	PAS	—N/a	—N/a
N.14	Kelebang	Lim Ban Hong (BN)	Lim Ban Hong	MCA	Gue Teck	PKR	Mohd Shafiq Ismail	PAS	—N/a	—N/a
N.15	Pengkalan Batu	Lim Jak Wong (IND)	Chua Lian Chye	Gerakan	Norhizam Hassan Baktee	DAP	Ramli Dalip	PAS	—N/a	—N/a
N.16	Ayer Keroh	Khoo Poay Tiong (PH)	Chua Kheng Hwa	MCA	Kerk Chee Yee	DAP	Sepri Rahman	PAS	—N/a	—N/a
N.17	Bukit Katil	Md. Khalid Kassim (GS)	Yunus Hitam	UMNO	Adli Zahari	Amanah	Muhamat Puhat Bedol	PAS	—N/a	—N/a
N.18	Ayer Molek	Md. Yunos Husin (BN)	Rahmad Mariman	UMNO	Farhan Ibrahim	PKR	Jantan Abdullah	PAS	Kamarolzaman Mohd Jidi	IND
N.19	Kesidang	Chin Choong Seong (IND)	Ng Choon Koon	MCA	Seah Shoo Chin	DAP	—N/a	—N/a	Goh Leong San	IND
N.20	Kota Laksamana	Lai Keun Ban (PH)	Melvia Chua Kew Wei	MCA	Low Chee Leong	DAP	—N/a	—N/a	Sim Tong Him	IND
N.21	Duyong	Goh Leong San (IND)	Lee Kiat Lee	MCA	Damian Yeo Shen Li	DAP	Kamarudin Sedik	PAS	Lim Jak Wong	IND
N.22	Bandar Hilir	Tey Kok Kiew (PH)	Lee Chong Meng	MCA	Tey Kok Kiew	DAP	—N/a	—N/a	Chin Choong Seong	IND
N.23	Telok Mas	Latiff Tamby Chik (BN)	Abdul Razak Abdul Rahman	UMNO	Noor Effandi Ahmad	PPBM	Rosazli Md Yasin	PAS	—N/a	—N/a
N.24	Bemban	Ng Choon Koon (BN)	Koh Chin Han	MCA	Wong Fort Pin	DAP	Suhaimi Harun	PAS	—N/a	—N/a
N.25	Rim	Ghazale Muhamad (BN)	Ghazale Muhamad	UMNO	Shamsul Iskandar Mohd Akin	PKR	Kintan Man	PAS	—N/a	—N/a
N.26	Serkam	Zaidi Attan (BN)	Zaidi Attan	UMNO	Nor Khairi Yusof	Amanah	Ahmad Bilal Rahudin	PAS	—N/a	—N/a
N.27	Merlimau	Roslan Ahmad (BN)	Roslan Ahmad	UMNO	Yuhaizad Abdullah	Amanah	Abdul Malek Yusof	PAS	—N/a	—N/a
N.28	Sungai Rambai	Hasan Abd. Rahman (BN)	Hasan Abd Rahman	UMNO	Azalina Abdul Rahman	PPBM	Zakariya Kasnin	PAS	—N/a	—N/a

=== Johor (56) ===
State constituency		Incumbent MLA	Political parties							
State constituency		Incumbent MLA	Barisan Nasional		Pakatan Harapan		Gagasan Sejahtera		Other parties	
State constituency		Incumbent MLA	Candidate Name	Party	Candidate Name	Party	Candidate Name	Party	Candidate Name	Party
N.01	Buloh Kasap	Norshida Ibrahim (BN)	Zahari Sarip	UMNO	Norsamsu Mohd. Yusof	PKR	—N/a	—N/a	—N/a	—N/a
N.02	Jementah	Tan Chen Choon (PH)	Chiam Yok Meng	MCA	Tan Chen Choon	DAP	Khairul Faizi Ahmad Kamil	PAS	—N/a	—N/a
N.03	Pemanis	Lau Chin Hoon (BN)	Khoo Siaw Lee	MCA	Dr. Chong Fat Full	PKR	Normala Sudirman	PAS	—N/a	—N/a
N.04	Kemelah	Ayub Rahmat (BN)	Anuar Abd. Manap	UMNO	Dr. Sulaiman Mohd. Nor	AMANAH	—N/a	—N/a	—N/a	—N/a
N.05	Tenang	Mohd. Azahar Ibrahim (BN)	Mohd. Azahar Ibrahim	UMNO	Solihan Badri	PPBM	Nasharudin Awang	PAS	—N/a	—N/a
N.06	Bekok	Lim Eng Guan (PH)	Tan Chong	MCA	Dr. Ramakrishnan Suppiah	DAP	—N/a	—N/a	—N/a	—N/a
N.07	Bukit Kepong	Ismail Mohamed (BN)	Mohd. Noor Taib	UMNO	Dr. Sahrudin Jamal	PPBM	Iqbal Razak	PAS	—N/a	—N/a
N.08	Bukit Pasir	Dr. Shahruddin Md Salleh (PH)	Noriah Mahat	UMNO	—N/a	—N/a	Capt. (Rtd.) Najib Lep	PAS	—N/a	—N/a
N.09	Gambir	Asojan Muniandy (BN)	Asojan Muniandy	MIC	Muhyiddin Yassin	PPBM	Dr. Mahfodz Mohamed	PAS	—N/a	—N/a
N.10	Tangkak	Ee Chin Li (PH)	Goh Tee Tee	MCA	Ee Chin Li	DAP	—N/a	—N/a	—N/a	—N/a
N.11	Serom	Abd. Razak Minhat (BN)	Abdull Rahim Talib	UMNO	Dr. Faizul Amri Adnan	AMANAH	Mustaffa Salleh	PAS	—N/a	—N/a
N.12	Bentayan	Chua Wee Beng (PH)	Lee Kim Heng	MCA	Ng Yak Howe	DAP	—N/a	—N/a	—N/a	—N/a
N.13	Simpang Jeram	Sheikh Ibrahim Salleh (GS)	Mohd. Radzi Amin	UMNO	Salahuddin Ayub	AMANAH	Dr. Mohd. Mazri Yahya	PAS	Ahmad Hashim	IND
N.14	Bukit Naning	Saipolbahari Suib (BN)	Hassan Johari	UMNO	Md. Ysahrudin Kusni	PKR	Azman Ibrahim	PAS	Jeganathan Subramanian	IND
N.15	Maharani	Dr. Mohammad Taslim (GS)	Ashari Md. Sarip	UMNO	Nor Hayati Bachok	AMANAH	Dr. Mohammad Taslim	PAS	—N/a	—N/a
N.16	Sungai Balang	Zaiton Ismail (BN)	Zaiton Ismail	UMNO	Na'im Jusri	PKR	Cheman Yusoh	PAS	—N/a	—N/a
N.17	Semerah	Mohd. Ismail Roslan (BN)	Mohd. Ismail Roslan	UMNO	Mohd. Khuzzan Abu Bakar	PKR	Wan Adnan Othman	PAS	—N/a	—N/a
N.18	Sri Medan	Zulkurnain Kamisan (BN)	Zulkurnain Kamisan	UMNO	Mohd. Ajib Omar	PPBM	Sallehudin Ab. Rasid	PAS	—N/a	—N/a
N.19	Yong Peng	Chew Peck Yoo (PH)	Ling Tian Soon	MCA	Chew Peck Yoo	DAP	Muhammad Abdullah	PAS	—N/a	—N/a
N.20	Semarang	Samsolbari Jamali (BN)	Samsolbari Jamali	UMNO	Zais Mohd. Akil	PPBM	Mohd. Bakri Samian	PAS	—N/a	—N/a
N.21	Parit Yaani	Aminolhuda Hassan (PH)	Soh Lip Yan	MCA	Aminolhuda Hassan	AMANAH	Nasir Abdullah	PAS	—N/a	—N/a
N.22	Parit Raja	Azizah Zakaria (BN)	Rashidah Ramli	UMNO	Ferdaus Kayau	PPBM	Abdul Hadi Harun	PAS	—N/a	—N/a
N.23	Penggaram	Gan Peck Cheng (PH)	Kang Beng Kuan	MCA	Gan Peck Cheng	DAP	Misran Samian	PAS	—N/a	—N/a
N.24	Senggarang	A. Aziz Ismail (BN)	Zaidi Japar	UMNO	Khairuddin Abdul Rahim	AMANAH	Dr. Mohd. Ramli Md. Kari	PAS	—N/a	—N/a
N.25	Rengit	Ayub Jamil (BN)	Ayub Jamil	UMNO	Malik Faishal Ahmad	PKR	Mohd. Tumiran Ahmad	PAS	—N/a	—N/a
N.26	Machap	Abd. Taib Abu Bakar (BN)	Abd. Taib Abu Bakar	UMNO	Ahmad Ahem	PPBM	Azlisham Azahar	PAS	—N/a	—N/a
N.27	Layang-Layang	Abd. Mutalip Abd. Rahim (BN)	Onn Hafiz Ghazi	UMNO	Murugan Muthu Samy	PKR	Mohd. Jubri Selamat	PAS	—N/a	—N/a
N.28	Mengkibol	Tan Hong Pin (PH)	Chin Sim Lai	MCA	Chew Chong Sin	DAP	—N/a	—N/a	—N/a	—N/a
N.29	Mahkota	Md. Jais Sarday (BN)	Md. Jais Sarday	UMNO	Muhamad Said Jonit	AMANAH	Hasbullah Najib	PAS	—N/a	—N/a
N.30	Paloh	Teoh Yap Kun (BN)	Teoh Yap Kun	MCA	Sheikh Omar Ali	DAP	—N/a	—N/a	Shamugam Munisamy	IND
N.31	Kahang	Vidyanathan Ramanadhan (BN)	Vidyanathan Ramanadhan	MIC	Noorlihan Ariffin	PPBM	—N/a	—N/a	—N/a	—N/a
N.32	Endau	Abd. Latiff Bandi (BN)	Alwiyah Talib	UMNO	Norul Haszarul Abu Samah	PPBM	Roslan Nikmat	PAS	—N/a	—N/a
N.33	Tenggaroh	Raven Kumar Krishnasamy (BN)	Raven Kumar Krishnasamy	MIC	Rahamizon Abdul Ghani	PKR	A. Rahman A. Hamid	PAS	—N/a	—N/a
N.34	Panti	Baderi Dasuki (BN)	Hahasrin Hashim	UMNO	Intan Jawahir Hussein	PPBM	Lt. Col. (Rtd.) Mohd. Nazari Mokhtar	PAS	—N/a	—N/a
N.35	Pasir Raja	Dr. Adham Baba (BN)	Rashidah Ismail	UMNO	Abrary Ramly	AMANAH	Bahrin Alias	PAS	—N/a	—N/a
N.36	Sedili	Rasman Ithnain (BN)	Rasman Ithnain	UMNO	Abd. Razak Esa	PKR	—N/a	—N/a	—N/a	—N/a
N.37	Johor Lama	Asiah Md. Ariff (BN)	Rosleli Jahari	UMNO	Nor Ashidah Ibrahim	PKR	Siti Zaharah Othman	PAS	—N/a	—N/a
N.38	Penawar	Hamimah Mansor (BN)	Sharifah Azizah Syed Zain Al-Shahab	UMNO	Ahmad Kamah Nor	AMANAH	—N/a	—N/a	—N/a	—N/a
N.39	Tanjung Surat	Syed Sis A. Rahman (BN)	Syed Sis A. Rahman	UMNO	Dr. Zamil Najwah Arbain	PKR	—N/a	—N/a	—N/a	—N/a
N.40	Tiram	Maulizan Bujang (BN)	Maulizan Bujang	UMNO	Gopalakrishnan Subramaniam	PKR	Azman Atmin	PAS	—N/a	—N/a
N.41	Puteri Wangsa	Abdullah Husin (GS)	Abd. Aziz Tohak	UMNO	Mazlan Bujang	PPBM	Abdullah Husin	PAS	Lim Yak Hong	IND
N.41	Puteri Wangsa	Abdullah Husin (GS)	Abd. Aziz Tohak	UMNO	Mazlan Bujang	PPBM	Abdullah Husin	PAS	Ting Choon Chai	IND
N.42	Johor Jaya	Liow Cai Tung (PH)	Tan Cher Puk	MCA	Liow Cai Tung	DAP	Kumutha Rahman	PAS	—N/a	—N/a
N.43	Permas	Mohamed Khaled Nordin (BN)	Mohamed Khaled Nordin	UMNO	Che Zakaria Mohd. Salleh	PPBM	Ab. Aziz Abdullah	PAS	Rohani Yaacob	IND
N.44	Larkin	Adam Sumiru (BN)	Yahya Ja'afar	UMNO	Mohd. Izhar Ahmad	PPBM	Zakiah Tukirin	PAS	—N/a	—N/a
N.45	Stulang	Chen Kah Eng (PH)	Ang Boon Heng	MCA	Chen Kah Eng	DAP	—N/a	—N/a	—N/a	—N/a
N.46	Perling	Cheo Hee Yow (PH)	Wong You Fong	MCA	Cheo Hee Yow	DAP	Muhamad Nazrin Ihsan	PAS	—N/a	—N/a
N.47	Kempas	Tengku Putra Haron Aminurrashid Tengku Hamid Jumat (BN)	Ramlee Bohani	UMNO	Osman Sapian	PPBM	Dzulkifli Suleiman	PAS	—N/a	—N/a
N.48	Skudai	Boo Cheng Hau (PH)	Kanan Suppiah	MIC	Tan Hong Pin	DAP	—N/a	—N/a	—N/a	—N/a
N.49	Kota Iskandar	Zaini Abu Bakar (BN)	Mohd. Khairi A. Malik	UMNO	Sr. Dzulkefly Ahmad	AMANAH	Sallehuddin Mohd. Dahiran	PAS	—N/a	—N/a
N.50	Bukit Permai	Ali Mazat Salleh (BN)	Ali Mazat Salleh	UMNO	Tosrin Jarvanthi	PPBM	Abd. Aziz Ja'afar	PAS	—N/a	—N/a
N.51	Bukit Batu	Jimmy Puah Wee Tse (PH)	Teo Lee Ho	MCA	Jimmy Puah Wee Tse	PKR	Juwahir Amin	PAS	—N/a	—N/a
N.52	Senai	Wong Shu Qi (PH)	Shen Poh Kuan	MCA	Tee Boon Tsong	DAP	—N/a	—N/a	—N/a	—N/a
N.53	Benut	Ir. Hasni Mohammad (BN)	Ir. Hasni Mohammad	UMNO	Zulkifly Tasrep	PPBM	Mohd. Firdaus Jaafar	PAS	—N/a	—N/a
N.54	Pulai Sebatang	Tee Siew Kiong (BN)	Tee Siew Kiong	UMNO	Taqiuddin Cheman	AMANAH	Dr. Baharom Mohamad	PAS	—N/a	—N/a
N.55	Pekan Nanas	Yeo Tung Siong (PH)	Tan Eng Meng	MCA	Yeo Tung Siong	DAP	—N/a	—N/a	—N/a	—N/a
N.56	Kukup	Suhaimi Salleh (BN)	Md. Othman Yusof	UMNO	Suhaizan Kayat	AMANAH	Dr. Karim Deraman	PAS	—N/a	—N/a

=== Sabah (60) ===
State constituency		Incumbent MLA	Political parties									
State constituency		Incumbent MLA	Barisan Nasional		Pakatan Harapan		Gagasan Sejahtera		Gabungan Sabah		Other parties	
State constituency		Incumbent MLA	Candidate Name	Party	Candidate Name	Party	Candidate Name	Party	Candidate Name	Party	Candidate Name	Party
N.01	Banggi	Abdul Mijul Unaini (BN)	Abdul Mijul Unaini	UMNO	—N/a	—N/a	—N/a	—N/a	Kusugan Ali (PPRS); Abidula Amsana (PHRS); Norlaji Amir Hassan (STAR)		Mohammad Mohamarin (WARISAN); Abdul Nasir Jamaluddin (PKS)	
N.02	Tanjong Kapor	Teo Chee Kang (BN)	Teo Chee Kang	LDP	—N/a	—N/a	Aliasgar Omolong	PAS	Allaidly Poyon	PPRS	Chong Chen Bin (WARISAN); Thomas Tsen Chau Yin (PCS)	
N.03	Pitas	Bolkiah Ismail (BN)	Bolkiah Ismail	UMNO	—N/a	—N/a	Dausieh Queck	PAS	Bakir Mancaing	PHRS	Maklin Masiau (WARISAN); Pransol Tiying (ANAK NEGERI); Ramlah Nasir (PKS)	
N.04	Matunggong	Jelani Hamdan (IND)	Julita Majunki	PBS	Sazalye Donol Abdullah	PKR	—N/a	—N/a	Marunsai Dawai	STAR	Jornah Mozihim (PCS); Rahim Madhakong (PKS)	
N.05	Tandek	Anita Baranting (BN)	Anita Baranting	PBS	—N/a	—N/a	—N/a	—N/a	Joel Masilung	STAR	Baintin Adun (WARISAN); Johnson Gaban (PCS)	
N.06	Tempasuk	Musbah Jamli (BN)	Musbah Jamli	UMNO	Mustapha Sakmud	PKR	Mustaqim Aling	PAS	Suwah Buleh	STAR	—N/a	—N/a
N.07	Kadamaian	Jeremmy Malajad (IND)	Ewon Benedick	UPKO	Lukia Indan	PKR	Satail Majungkat	PAS	Rubbin Guribah	STAR	Mail Balinu	PCS
N.08	Usukan	Dr. Mohd. Salleh Mohd. Said (BN)	Japlin Akim	UMNO	—N/a	—N/a	Adzmin Awang	PAS	—N/a	—N/a	Abdul Bakhrin Mohd. Yusof (WARISAN); Amsor Tuah (IND)	
N.09	Tamparuli	Wilfred Bumburing (PCS)	Jahid Jahim	PBS	Dausil Kundayong	PKR	—N/a	—N/a	Samin Dulin	STAR	Wilfred Bumburing	PCS
N.10	Sulaman	Hajiji Noor (BN)	Hajiji Noor	UMNO	—N/a	—N/a	—N/a	—N/a	Arifin Harith	PHRS	Abdullah Sani Daud	WARISAN
N.11	Kiulu	Joniston Bangkuai (BN)	Joniston Bangkuai	PBS	—N/a	—N/a	—N/a	—N/a	Terence Sinti	STAR	Jo-Anna Sue Henley Rampas (WARISAN); Gaibin Ransoi (PCS)	
N.12	Karambunai	Jainab Ahmad Ayid (BN)	Jainab Ahmad Ayid	UMNO	—N/a	—N/a	Aspar Oyet	PAS	Ahsim Jamat	SAPP	Azhar Matussin	WARISAN
N.13	Inanam	Dr. Roland Chia Ming Shen (PH)	Johnny Goh Chin Lok	PBS	Kenny Chua Teck Ho	PKR	—N/a	—N/a	Johnny Stephen Dionysius	SAPP	Jakariah Janit (PKS); Terence Tsen Kim Fatt (ANAK NEGERI); Situl Mintow (IND)	
N.14	Likas	Wong Hong Jun (WARISAN)	Chin Su Ying	LDP	Tan Lee Fatt	DAP	—N/a	—N/a	Yong We Kong	SAPP	—N/a	—N/a
N.15	Api-Api	Christina Liew Chin Jin (PH)	Dr. Yee Moh Chai	PBS	Christina Liew Chin Jin	PKR	—N/a	—N/a	Lim Kat Chung	SAPP	Len Lip Fong (ANAK NEGERI); Chan Chee Ching (IND)	
N.16	Luyang	Hiew King Chew (BN)	Dr. Pamela Yong	MCA	Ginger Phoong Jin Zhe	DAP	—N/a	—N/a	Gee Tien Siong	SAPP	—N/a	—N/a
N.17	Tanjong Aru	Edward Yong Oui Fah (BN)	Edward Yong Oui Fah	PBS	—N/a	—N/a	Hamid Ismail	PAS	Noraiza Mohammad Noor	PHRS	Wong Hong Jun (WARISAN); Chong Wei Leung (ANAK NEGERI)	
N.18	Petagas	Yahya Hussin (BN)	Yahya Hussin	UMNO	—N/a	—N/a	—N/a	—N/a	Ester Otion	PHRS	Uda Sulai	WARISAN
N.19	Kapayan	Edwin Bosi (IND)	Francis Goh Fah Sun	MCA	Janie Lasimbang	DAP	—N/a	—N/a	Chong Pit Fah	STAR	—N/a	—N/a
N.20	Moyog	Terrence Siambun (WARISAN)	Donald Peter Mojuntin	UPKO	—N/a	—N/a	—N/a	—N/a	Danim Siap	STAR	Jenifer Lasimbang (WARISAN); Bandasan Tunding (PCS)	
N.21	Kawang	Ghulam Haidar Khan Bahadar (BN)	Ghulam Haidar Khan Bahadar	UMNO	—N/a	—N/a	—N/a	—N/a	Matlin Jilon	PHRS	Salleh Eddris (WARISAN); Wahid Ismail (ANAK NEGERI)	
N.22	Pantai Manis	Abdul Rahim Ismail (BN)	Abdul Rahim Ismail	UMNO	—N/a	—N/a	—N/a	—N/a	James Ghani	PHRS	Aidi Mokhtar (WARISAN); Herman Jawasing Mianus (PCS)	
N.23	Bongawan	Mohamad Alamin (BN)	Mohamad Alamin	UMNO	—N/a	—N/a	—N/a	—N/a	Jaafar Ismail	PHRS	Daud Yusof	WARISAN
N.24	Membakut	Mohd. Arifin Mohd. Arif (BN)	Mohd. Arifin Mohd. Arif	UMNO	—N/a	—N/a	—N/a	—N/a	Ali Omar Mohd. Idris	PHRS	Abdul Sani Marip (WARISAN); Rosjelen Salimat (PCS); Yahya Ahmad (IND)	
N.25	Klias	Lajim Ukin (PHRS)	Isnin Aliasnih	UMNO	—N/a	—N/a	—N/a	—N/a	Lajim Ukin	PHRS	Johair Mat Lani	WARISAN
N.26	Kuala Penyu	Limus Jury (BN)	Limus Jury	UPKO	Dikin Musah	PKR	—N/a	—N/a	Jonas Sunggim	PHRS	Herman Tiongsoh	PCS
N.27	Lumadan	Kamarlin Ombi (BN)	Matbali Musah	UMNO	—N/a	—N/a	—N/a	—N/a	Asmat Japar	PHRS	Md. Samlih Juaisin	WARISAN
N.28	Sindumin	Ahmad Bujang (BN)	Sapawi Ahmad	UMNO	—N/a	—N/a	—N/a	—N/a	Patrick Sadom	PHRS	Dr. Yusof Yacob	WARISAN
N.29	Kundasang	Dr. Joachim Gunsalam (BN)	Dr. Joachim Gunsalam	PBS	—N/a	—N/a	—N/a	—N/a	Japril Suhaimin	STAR	Siriman M. F. Basir (WARISAN); Henrynus Amin (ANAK NEGERI); Jinus Sodiong (PKS)	
N.30	Karanaan	Masidi Manjun (BN)	Masidi Manjun	UMNO	Chong Peck Hing	PKR	—N/a	—N/a	Adzman Manaf	PHRS	Juhaili Sidek	ANAK NEGERI
N.31	Paginatan	Vacant	Abidin Madingkir	UPKO	—N/a	—N/a	—N/a	—N/a	Mat Jaili Samat (PPRS); Feddrin Tuling (STAR)		Julian Sidin (WARISAN); Satiol Indong (PCS)	
N.32	Tambunan	Joseph Pairin Kitingan (BN)	Joseph Pairin Kitingan	PBS	—N/a	—N/a	—N/a	—N/a	Dr. Jeffrey Kitingan	STAR	Justin Alip (WARISAN); Nestor Joannes (PCS)	
N.33	Bingkor	Dr. Jeffrey Kitingan (STAR)	Peter Aliun	PBS	Peter Dhom Saili	DAP	—N/a	—N/a	Robert Nordin	STAR	Uling Anggan (PKS); Aisat Igau (ANAK NEGERI); Justin Guka (IND)	
N.34	Liawan	Sairin Karno (BN)	Sairin Karno	UMNO	—N/a	—N/a	—N/a	—N/a	Kong Fui Seng	STAR	Rasinin Kautis (WARISAN); Hussein Kassim (PCS)	
N.35	Melalap	Radin Malleh (BN)	Radin Malleh	PBS	—N/a	—N/a	—N/a	—N/a	Jaineh Juata	STAR	Peter Anthony (WARISAN); Chinly Moniu (PCS); Lidos Rabih (PKS)	
N.36	Kemabong	Rubin Balang (BN)	Jamawi Jaafar	UMNO	—N/a	—N/a	—N/a	—N/a	Yahya Raimah	PHRS	Haris Bolos (WARISAN); Alfred Tay Jin Kiong (PCS)	
N.37	Sook	Ellron Alfred Angin (BN)	Ellron Alfred Angin	PBRS	—N/a	—N/a	—N/a	—N/a	Baritus Gungkit	STAR	Martin Tommy (WARISAN); Peter Beaty (ANAK NEGERI)	
N.38	Nabawan	Bobbey Ah Fang Suan (BN)	Bobbey Ah Fang Suan	UPKO	—N/a	—N/a	—N/a	—N/a	Apandi Angindi	PHRS	Ahuar Rasam (WARISAN); Nasruddin Lambahan (PCS)	
N.39	Sugut	James Ratib (BN)	James Ratib	UMNO	—N/a	—N/a	—N/a	—N/a	Mohd. Arshad Abdul	PPRS	Aspah Abdullah Sani (WARISAN); Ag. Osman Asibih (PKS)	
N.40	Labuk	Michael Asang (BN)	Abd. Rahman Kongkawang	PBS	—N/a	—N/a	—N/a	—N/a	Rainus Awang	STAR	Ramsah Tasim (WARISAN); James Miki (PCS); Albert Thomas Enti (PKS)	
N.41	Gum-Gum	Zakaria Mohd. Edris (BN)	Juslie Ajirol	UMNO	—N/a	—N/a	—N/a	—N/a	Jamaludin Lamba (PPRS); Dahil Masdik (PHRS)		Arunarsin Taib (WARISAN); Christine Bugung (PKS)	
N.42	Sungai Sibuga	Musa Aman (BN)	Musa Aman	UMNO	—N/a	—N/a	—N/a	—N/a	—N/a	—N/a	Asmara Abdul Rahman (WARISAN); Osman Enting (PKS)	
N.43	Sekong	Samsudin Yahya (BN)	Samsudin Yahya	UMNO	—N/a	—N/a	Sahar Abdul Majid	PAS	Abdul Rashid Abdul Rahman	STAR	Arifin Asgali (WARISAN); Alias Rahmad Benjamin (PKS); Datu Mohd. Faisal Datu Bachtiyal (IND)	
N.44	Karamunting	Charles O Pang Su Pin (BN)	Lim Kai Min	LDP	—N/a	—N/a	Norsah Bongsu	PAS	Besarun Kecha	STAR	Hiew Vun Zin	WARISAN
N.45	Elopura	Au Kam Wah (BN)	Chan Tzun Hei	LDP	Calvin Chong Ket Kiun	DAP	—N/a	—N/a	—N/a	—N/a	—N/a	—N/a
N.46	Tanjong Papat	Raymond Tan Shu Kiah (BN)	Raymond Tan Shu Kiah	GERAKAN	Frankie Poon Ming Fung	DAP	—N/a	—N/a	—N/a	—N/a	Jufazli Shi Ahmad	IND
N.47	Kuamut	Masiung Banah (BN)	Masiung Banah	UPKO	—N/a	—N/a	Jumaidin Lakalla	PAS	James Ait	STAR	Norfaizah Chua (WARISAN); Edward Podok (PCS)	
N.48	Sukau	Saddi Abdul Rahman (BN)	Saddi Abdul Rahman	UMNO	—N/a	—N/a	—N/a	—N/a	Muarrifidin Abdul Malek (PHRS); Abdulgani Kosui (PPRS)		Ismail Mohd. Ayub	WARISAN
N.49	Tungku	Vacant	Mizma Appehdullah	UMNO	—N/a	—N/a	—N/a	—N/a	Bulangan Palasi	PHRS	Assaffal P. Alian (WARISAN); Abd. Rahman Tanggoh (PKS)	
N.50	Lahad Datu	Mohammad Yusof Apdal (BN)	Mohammad Yusof Apdal	UMNO	—N/a	—N/a	—N/a	—N/a	Wong Yu Chin	PHRS	Dumi Pg. Masdal	WARISAN
N.51	Kunak	Nilwan Kabang (BN)	Nilwan Kabang	UMNO	—N/a	—N/a	Kasman Karate	PAS	Sahing Taking	PHRS	Norazlinah Arif	WARISAN
N.52	Sulabayan	Jaujan Sambakong (WARISAN)	Harman Mohamad	UMNO	—N/a	—N/a	Abdul Nasir Ab. Ralip	PAS	Untung Tanjong Baru	PHRS	Jaujan Sambakong	WARISAN
N.53	Senallang	Nasir Sakaran (BN)	Nasir Sakaran	UMNO	—N/a	—N/a	—N/a	—N/a	—N/a	—N/a	Mohd. Shafie Apdal	WARISAN
N.54	Bugaya	Ramlee Marhaban (BN)	Abdul Razak Sakaran	UMNO	—N/a	—N/a	Mahamod Sarahil	PAS	Mohammad Said Tiblan	PPRS	Manis Buka Mohd. Darah (WARISAN); Kulli Maralam (PKS); Abd. Muksin Mohammad Hassan (IND)	
N.55	Balung	Syed Abas Syed Ali (BN)	Osman Jamal	UMNO	—N/a	—N/a	Amboase Ramano	PAS	Razali Hamzah	PHRS	Andi Rus Diana Andi Paladjareng (WARISAN); Alipa Jackery (USNO Baru)	
N.56	Apas	Vacant	Nizam Abu Bakar Titingan	UMNO	—N/a	—N/a	Daud Jalaluddin	PAS	Alizaman Jijurahman	PHRS	Abdul Salip Ejal	WARISAN
N.57	Sri Tanjong	Chan Foong Hin (PH)	Lo Su Fui	PBS	Jimmy Wong Sze Phin	DAP	—N/a	—N/a	Pang Thou Chung	PHRS	Leong Yun Fui	PKS
N.58	Merotai	Pang Yuk Ming (BN)	Lim Ting Kai	LDP	Arbaani Akum	AMANAH	Ahmad Dullah	PAS	Sharata Masyaroh John Ridwan Lincoln	PHRS	Sarifuddin Hata (WARISAN); Azizul Tandek (PKS); Mohd. Nasir Sumadi (USNO Baru)	
N.59	Tanjong Batu	Hamisa Samat (BN)	Hamisa Samat	UMNO	—N/a	—N/a	Usman Madeaming	PAS	Ardi Arsah	PPRS	Ismail Senang	WARISAN
N.60	Sebatik	Abdul Muis Picho (BN)	Abdul Muis Picho	UMNO	—N/a	—N/a	Roslan Ramli	PAS	Yusri Yunus	PPRS	Hassan A. Gani Pg. Amir	WARISAN

== Results ==
All results were announced before 5 pm, 10 May.
