= Results of the 2018 Malaysian general election by parliamentary constituency =

These are the election results of the 2018 Malaysian general election by parliamentary constituency. Results are expected to come after 5 pm, 9 May 2018. Elected members of parliament (MPs) will be representing their constituency from the first sitting of 14th Malaysian Parliament to its dissolution.

The parliamentary election deposit was set at RM10,000 per candidate. Similar to previous elections, the election deposit will be forfeited if the particular candidate had failed to secure at least 12.5% or one-eighth of the votes.

== General results ==
Party or alliance		Votes	%	Seats	+/–
Pakatan Harapan	People's Justice Party	2,041,301	16.89	47	+17
Pakatan Harapan	Democratic Action Party	2,098,336	17.37	42	+4
Pakatan Harapan	Malaysian United Indigenous Party	723,741	5.99	13	New
Pakatan Harapan	National Trust Party	655,528	5.43	11	New
Pakatan Harapan	Total	5,518,906	45.68	113	+45
Barisan Nasional	United Malays National Organisation	2,525,713	20.90	54	–34
Barisan Nasional	Parti Pesaka Bumiputera Bersatu	220,479	1.82	13	–1
Barisan Nasional	Parti Rakyat Sarawak	59,218	0.49	3	–3
Barisan Nasional	Malaysian Indian Congress	167,061	1.38	2	–2
Barisan Nasional	Progressive Democratic Party	59,853	0.50	2	–2
Barisan Nasional	Malaysian Chinese Association	653,612	5.41	1	–6
Barisan Nasional	Sarawak United Peoples' Party	122,540	1.01	1	0
Barisan Nasional	United Sabah Party	58,351	0.48	1	–3
Barisan Nasional	UPKO	57,062	0.47	1	–2
Barisan Nasional	Parti Bersatu Rakyat Sabah	11,783	0.10	1	0
Barisan Nasional	Parti Gerakan Rakyat Malaysia	128,973	1.07	0	–1
Barisan Nasional	Liberal Democratic Party	8,996	0.07	0	0
Barisan Nasional	People's Progressive Party	7,422	0.06	0	0
Barisan Nasional	Total	4,081,063	33.78	79	–54
Gagasan Sejahtera	Pan-Malaysian Islamic Party	2,032,094	16.82	18	–3
Gagasan Sejahtera	Malaysia National Alliance Party	9,025	0.07	0	New
Gagasan Sejahtera	Pan-Malaysian Islamic Front	81	0.00	0	0
Gagasan Sejahtera	Total	2,041,200	16.89	18	–3
Sabah Heritage Party		280,520	2.32	8	+8
United Sabah Alliance	Sabah People's Hope Party	37,708	0.31	0	New
United Sabah Alliance	Homeland Solidarity Party	21,361	0.18	1	New
United Sabah Alliance	Sabah Progressive Party	6,090	0.05	0	0
United Sabah Alliance	Sabah People's Unity Party	2,016	0.02	0	New
United Sabah Alliance	Total	67,175	0.56	1	+1
Love Sabah Party		8,603	0.07	0	New
Socialist Party of Malaysia		3,782	0.03	0	New
Parti Rakyat Malaysia		2,372	0.02	0	New
Malaysian United Party		2,102	0.02	0	New
State Reform Party		1,299	0.01	0	0
Sabah Native Co-operation Party		1,173	0.01	0	New
Parti Rakyat Gabungan Jaksa Pendamai		1,005	0.01	0	New
Penang Front Party		892	0.01	0	New
Parti Bansa Dayak Sarawak Baru		538	0.00	0	New
Love Malaysia Party		502	0.00	0	0
Parti Bumi Kenyalang		392	0.00	0	New
People's Alternative Party		302	0.00	0	New
Independents		71,153	0.59	3	+3
Total		12,082,979	100.00	222	0
Valid votes		12,082,979	98.24		
Invalid/blank votes		217,088	1.76		
Total votes		12,300,067	100.00		
Registered voters/turnout		14,940,624	82.33		
Source: ElectionData.MY

== Contesting parties ==
Name		Ideology	Leader(s)	Seats contested	2013 result		Seats in 13th Dewan Rakyat
Name		Ideology	Leader(s)	Seats contested	Votes (%)	Seats	Seats in 13th Dewan Rakyat
BN	Barisan Nasional; National Front	National conservatism	Najib Razak	222	47.38%	133 / 222	130 / 222
PH	Pakatan Harapan; Alliance of Hope	Reformism / Progressivism	Mahathir Mohamad	204	36.1%	67 / 222	72 / 222
GS	Gagasan Sejahtera; Ideas of Prosperity	Islamic conservatism	Abdul Hadi Awang	158	14.78%	21 / 222	13 / 222
WARISAN	Parti Warisan Sabah; Sabah Heritage Party	Sabah regionalism	Mohd. Shafie Apdal	17	New Party	0 / 222	2 / 222
PSM	Parti Sosialis Malaysia; Socialist Party of Malaysia	Democratic socialism	Mohd. Nasir Hashim	4	0.19%	1 / 222	1 / 222
PHRS	Parti Harapan Rakyat Sabah; Sabah People's Hope Party	Sabah regionalism	Lajim Ukin	15	New Party	0 / 222	0 / 222
PCS	Parti Cinta Sabah; Love Sabah Party	Sabah regionalism	Nicholas James Guntobon	8	New Party	0 / 222	0 / 222
PRM	Parti Rakyat Malaysia; Malaysian People's Party	Left-wing nationalism	Ariffin Salimon	6	Did not contest	0 / 222	0 / 222
MUP	Parti Bersama Malaysia; Malaysian United Party	Social liberalism	Tan Gin Theam	5	New Party	0 / 222	0 / 222
STAR	Parti Solidariti Tanah Airku; Homeland Solidarity Party	Sabah regionalism	Jeffrey Kitingan	5	New Party	0 / 222	0 / 222
PPRS	Parti Perpaduan Rakyat Sabah; Sabah People's Unity Party	Sabah regionalism	Mohd Arshad Abdul Mualap	3	New Party	0 / 222	0 / 222
STAR	Parti Reformasi Negeri Sarawak; State Reform Party	Sarawak regionalism	Soo Lina	3	0.41%	0 / 222	0 / 222
PFP	Parti Barisan Pulau Pinang; Penang Front Party	Penang regionalism	Patrick Ooi	2	New Party	0 / 222	0 / 222
SAPP	Parti Maju Sabah; Sabah Progressive Party	Sabah regionalism	Yong Teck Lee	2	0.09%	0 / 222	0 / 222
Anak Negeri	Parti Kerjasama Anak Negeri; Sabah Native Co-operation Party	Sabah regionalism	Zainal Hj. Nasirudin	2	New Party	0 / 222	0 / 222
PEACE	Parti Rakyat Gabungan Jaksa Pendamai; People’s Alliance For Justice of Peace	Sarawak regionalism	Julian Petrus Jout	2	New Party	0 / 222	0 / 222
PCM	Parti Cinta Malaysia; Love Malaysia Party	Conservative nationalism	Tang Weng Chew	1	0.02%	0 / 222	0 / 222
Berjasa	Barisan Jemaah Islamiah Se-Malaysia; Pan-Malaysian Islamic Front	Islamic conservatism	Abdul Kadir bin Mamat	1	0.29%	0 / 222	0 / 222
PAP	Parti Alternatif Rakyat; People's Alternative Party	Centrism	A. David Dass	1	New Party	0 / 222	0 / 222
PBDSB	Parti Bansa Dayak Sarawak Baru; New Sarawak Native People's Party	Sarawak regionalism	Louis Jarau	1	New Party	0 / 222	0 / 222
PBK	Parti Bumi Kenyalang; Land of the Hornbill Party	Sarawak regionalism	Yu Chang Ping	1	New Party	0 / 222	0 / 222
Independents		–	–	24	–	0 / 222	2 / 222

== Perlis ==
#	Constituency	Registered Electors	Winner	Votes	Votes %	Majority	Opponent(s)	Votes	Votes %	Total valid votes	Incumbent
BN 2 | PH 1 | GS 0 | Independent 0
P001	Padang Besar	46,096	Zahidi Zainul Abidin (BN–UMNO)	15,032	41.19%	1,438	Izizam Ibrahim (PH–PPBM)	13,594	37.24%	36,500	Zahidi Zainul Abidin (BN–UMNO)
P001	Padang Besar	46,096	Zahidi Zainul Abidin (BN–UMNO)	15,032	41.19%	1,438	Mokhtar Senik (GS–PAS)	7,874	21.57%	36,500	Zahidi Zainul Abidin (BN–UMNO)
P002	Kangar	55,938	Noor Amin Ahmad (PH–PKR)	20,909	46.79%	5,603	Ramli Shariff (BN–UMNO)	15,306	34.26%	44,680	Shaharuddin Ismail (BN–UMNO)
P002	Kangar	55,938	Noor Amin Ahmad (PH–PKR)	20,909	46.79%	5,603	Mohamad Zahid Ibrahim (GS–PAS)	15,143	18.95%	44,680	Shaharuddin Ismail (BN–UMNO)
P003	Arau	48,187	Shahidan Kassim (BN–UMNO)	16,547	41.79%	4,856	Abd Rahman Daud (PH–PPBM)	11,691	29.52%	39,600	Shahidan Kassim (BN–UMNO)
P003	Arau	48,187	Shahidan Kassim (BN–UMNO)	16,547	41.79%	4,856	Hashim Jasin (GS–PAS)	11,362	28.69%	39,600	Shahidan Kassim (BN–UMNO)

== Kedah ==
#	Constituency	Registered Electors	Winner	Votes	Votes %	Majority	Opponent(s)	Votes	Votes %	Total valid votes	Incumbent
PH 10 | GS 3 | BN 2 | Independent 0
P004	Langkawi	42,697	Mahathir Mohamad (PH–PPBM)	18,954	54.90%	8,893	Nawawi Ahmad (BN–UMNO)	10,061	29.14%	34,527	Nawawi Ahmad (BN–UMNO)
P004	Langkawi	42,697	Mahathir Mohamad (PH–PPBM)	18,954	54.90%	8,893	Zubir Ahmad (GS–PAS)	5,512	15.96%	34,527	Nawawi Ahmad (BN–UMNO)
P005	Jerlun	54,132	Mukhriz Mahathir (PH–PPBM)	18,695	42.55%	5,866	Abdul Ghani Ahmad (GS–PAS)	12,829	29.20%	43,937	Othman Aziz (BN–UMNO)
P005	Jerlun	54,132	Mukhriz Mahathir (PH–PPBM)	18,695	42.55%	5,866	Othman Aziz (BN–UMNO)	12,413	28.25%	43,937	Othman Aziz (BN–UMNO)
P006	Kubang Pasu	73,881	Amiruddin Hamzah (PH–PPBM)	29,984	49.69%	13,009	Mohd Johari Baharum (BN–UMNO)	16,975	28.14%	60,334	Mohd Johari Baharum (BN–UMNO)
P006	Kubang Pasu	73,881	Amiruddin Hamzah (PH–PPBM)	29,984	49.69%	13,009	Norhafiza Fadzil (GS–PAS)	13,375	22.17%	60,334	Mohd Johari Baharum (BN–UMNO)
P007	Padang Terap	46,644	Mahdzir Khalid (BN–UMNO)	16,384	42.09%	1,099	Mohd Azam Abd Aziz (GS–PAS)	15,285	39.27%	38,923	Mahdzir Khalid (BN–UMNO)
P007	Padang Terap	46,644	Mahdzir Khalid (BN–UMNO)	16,384	42.09%	1,099	Mohd Khairizal Khazali (PH–AMANAH)	7,254	18.64%	38,923	Mahdzir Khalid (BN–UMNO)
P008	Pokok Sena	86,892	Mahfuz Omar (PH–AMANAH)	28,959	40.93%	5,558	Muhamad Radhi Mat Din (GS–PAS)	23,401	33.08%	70,750	Mahfuz Omar (PH–AMANAH)
P008	Pokok Sena	86,892	Mahfuz Omar (PH–AMANAH)	28,959	40.93%	5,558	Said Ali Said Rastan (BN–UMNO)	18,390	25.99%	70,750	Mahfuz Omar (PH–AMANAH)
P009	Alor Setar	80,272	Chan Ming Kai (PH–PKR)	32,475	50.80%	15,200	Muhammad Aminur Shafiq Mohamad Abduh (GS–PAS)	17,275	27.02%	63,931	Gooi Hsiao-Leung (PH–PKR)
P009	Alor Setar	80,272	Chan Ming Kai (PH–PKR)	32,475	50.80%	15,200	Yoo Wei How (BN–MCA)	14,181	22.18%	63,931	Gooi Hsiao-Leung (PH–PKR)
P010	Kuala Kedah	97,753	Azman Ismail (PH–PKR)	36,624	46.26%	13,481	Mohd Riduan Othman (GS–PAS)	23,143	29.23%	79,167	Azman Ismail (PH–PKR)
P010	Kuala Kedah	97,753	Azman Ismail (PH–PKR)	36,624	46.26%	13,481	Abdullah Hasnan Kamaruddin (BN–UMNO)	19,400	24.51%	79,167	Azman Ismail (PH–PKR)
P011	Pendang	74,867	Awang Hashim (GS–PAS)	26,536	42.63%	5,808	Othman Abdul (BN–UMNO)	20,728	33.30%	62,246	Othman Abdul (BN–UMNO)
P011	Pendang	74,867	Awang Hashim (GS–PAS)	26,536	42.63%	5,808	Wan Saifulruddin Wan Jan (PH–PPBM)	14,901	23.94%	62,246	Othman Abdul (BN–UMNO)
P011	Pendang	74,867	Awang Hashim (GS–PAS)	26,536	42.63%	5,808	Abdul Malik Manaf (IND)	81	0.13%	62,246	Othman Abdul (BN–UMNO)
P012	Jerai	79,976	Sabri Azit (GS–PAS)	22,312	33.94%	539	Jamil Khir Baharom (BN–UMNO)	21,773	33.12%	65,736	Jamil Khir Baharom (BN–UMNO)
P012	Jerai	79,976	Sabri Azit (GS–PAS)	22,312	33.94%	539	Akhramsyah Muammar Ubaidah Sanusi (PH–PPBM)	21,651	32.94%	65,736	Jamil Khir Baharom (BN–UMNO)
P013	Sik	50,385	Ahmad Tarmizi Sulaiman (GS–PAS)	20,088	47.91%	5,218	Mansor Abd Rahman (BN–UMNO)	14,870	35.47%	41,928	Mansor Abd Rahman (BN–UMNO)
P013	Sik	50,385	Ahmad Tarmizi Sulaiman (GS–PAS)	20,088	47.91%	5,218	Azli Che Uda (PH–AMANAH)	6,970	16.62%	41,928	Mansor Abd Rahman (BN–UMNO)
P014	Merbok	87,782	Nor Azrina Surip (PH–PKR)	30,902	43.31%	10,072	Tajul Urus Mat Zain (BN–UMNO)	20,830	29.19%	71,350	Ismail Daut (BN–UMNO)
P014	Merbok	87,782	Nor Azrina Surip (PH–PKR)	30,902	43.31%	10,072	Ahmad Fauzi Ramli (GS–PAS)	19,618	27.50%	71,350	Ismail Daut (BN–UMNO)
P015	Sungai Petani	112,577	Johari Abdul (PH–PKR)	45,532	49.20%	21,569	Shahanim Mohamad Yusoff (BN–UMNO)	23,963	25.90%	92,534	Johari Abdul (PH–PKR)
P015	Sungai Petani	112,577	Johari Abdul (PH–PKR)	45,532	49.20%	21,569	Sharir Long (GS–PAS)	22,760	24.60%	92,534	Johari Abdul (PH–PKR)
P015	Sungai Petani	112,577	Johari Abdul (PH–PKR)	45,532	49.20%	21,569	Sritharan Pichathu (PRM)	279	0.30%	92,534	Johari Abdul (PH–PKR)
P016	Baling	107,213	Abdul Azeez Abdul Rahim (BN–UMNO)	38,557	42.60%	1,074	Hassan Saad (GS–PAS)	37,483	41.41%	90,512	Abdul Azeez Abdul Rahim (BN–UMNO)
P016	Baling	107,213	Abdul Azeez Abdul Rahim (BN–UMNO)	38,557	42.60%	1,074	Mohd Taufik Yaacob (PH–PPBM)	14,472	15.99%	90,512	Abdul Azeez Abdul Rahim (BN–UMNO)
P017	Padang Serai	84,834	Karupaiya Mutusami (PH–PKR)	31,724	45.27%	8,813	Muhd Sobri Osman (GS–PAS)	22,911	32.69%	70,084	Surendran K. Nagarajan (PH–PKR)
P017	Padang Serai	84,834	Karupaiya Mutusami (PH–PKR)	31,724	45.27%	8,813	Leong Yong Kong (BN–MCA)	15,449	22.04%	70,084	Surendran K. Nagarajan (PH–PKR)
P018	Kulim-Bandar Baharu	66,587	Saifuddin Nasution Ismail (PH–PKR)	23,159	42.62%	4,860	Abd. Aziz Sheikh Fadzir (BN–UMNO)	18,299	33.67%	54,343	Abd. Aziz Sheikh Fadzir (BN–UMNO)
P018	Kulim-Bandar Baharu	66,587	Saifuddin Nasution Ismail (PH–PKR)	23,159	42.62%	4,860	Hassan Abdul Razak (GS–PAS)	12,885	23.71%	54,343	Abd. Aziz Sheikh Fadzir (BN–UMNO)

== Kelantan ==
#	Constituency	Registered Electors	Winner	Votes	Votes %	Majority	Opponent(s)	Votes	Votes %	Total valid votes	Incumbent
GS 9 | BN 5 | PH 0 | Independent 0
P019	Tumpat	110,924	Che Abdullah Mat Nawi (GS–PAS)	47,041	54.33%	17,500	Wan Johani Wan Hussin (BN–UMNO)	29,541	34.12%	86,585	Kamarudin Jaffar (PH–PKR)
P019	Tumpat	110,924	Che Abdullah Mat Nawi (GS–PAS)	47,041	54.33%	17,500	Nordin Salleh (PH–PPBM)	10,003	11.55%	86,585	Kamarudin Jaffar (PH–PKR)
P020	Pengkalan Chepa	75,384	Ahmad Marzuk Shaary (GS–PAS)	32,592	54.88%	13,232	Zaluzi Sulaiman (BN–UMNO)	19,360	32.60%	59,387	Izani Husin (GS–PAS)
P020	Pengkalan Chepa	75,384	Ahmad Marzuk Shaary (GS–PAS)	32,592	54.88%	13,232	Mohamad Ibrahim (PH–AMANAH)	7,435	12.52%	59,387	Izani Husin (GS–PAS)
P021	Kota Bharu	88,708	Takiyuddin Hassan (GS–PAS)	28,291	42.25%	5,869	Husam Musa (PH–AMANAH)	22,422	33.48%	66,969	Takiyuddin Hassan (GS–PAS)
P021	Kota Bharu	88,708	Takiyuddin Hassan (GS–PAS)	28,291	42.25%	5,869	Fikhran Hamshi Mohamad Fatmi (BN–UMNO)	16,256	24.27%	66,969	Takiyuddin Hassan (GS–PAS)
P022	Pasir Mas	71,222	Ahmad Fadhli Shaari (GS–PAS)	28,080	52.44%	13,075	Nor Asmawi Ab Rahman (BN–UMNO)	15,005	28.02%	53,551	Nik Mohamad Abduh Nik Abdul Aziz (GS–PAS)
P022	Pasir Mas	71,222	Ahmad Fadhli Shaari (GS–PAS)	28,080	52.44%	13,075	Ibrahim Ali (IND)	5,373	10.03%	53,551	Nik Mohamad Abduh Nik Abdul Aziz (GS–PAS)
P022	Pasir Mas	71,222	Ahmad Fadhli Shaari (GS–PAS)	28,080	52.44%	13,075	Che Ujang Che Daud (PH–PKR)	5,093	9.51%	53,551	Nik Mohamad Abduh Nik Abdul Aziz (GS–PAS)
P023	Rantau Panjang	66,115	Siti Zailah Mohd Yusoff (GS–PAS)	24,581	50.82%	6,150	Abdullah Mat Yasim (BN–UMNO)	18,431	38.10%	48,373	Siti Zailah Mohd Yusoff (GS–PAS)
P023	Rantau Panjang	66,115	Siti Zailah Mohd Yusoff (GS–PAS)	24,581	50.82%	6,150	Wan Shah Jihan Wan Din (PH–AMANAH)	5,361	11.08%	48,373	Siti Zailah Mohd Yusoff (GS–PAS)
P024	Kubang Kerian	82,018	Tuan Ibrahim Tuan Man (GS–PAS)	35,620	56.16%	19,369	Muhamad Abdul Ghani (BN–UMNO)	16,251	25.62%	63,428	Ahmad Baihaki Atiqullah (GS–PAS)
P024	Kubang Kerian	82,018	Tuan Ibrahim Tuan Man (GS–PAS)	35,620	56.16%	19,369	Abd Halim Yusof (PH–AMANAH)	11,557	18.22%	63,428	Ahmad Baihaki Atiqullah (GS–PAS)
P025	Bachok	92,606	Nik Mohamad Abduh Nik Abdul Aziz (GS–PAS)	36,188	48.92%	3,292	Awang Adek Hussin (BN–UMNO)	32,896	44.48%	73,964	Ahmad Marzuk Shaary (GS–PAS)
P025	Bachok	92,606	Nik Mohamad Abduh Nik Abdul Aziz (GS–PAS)	36,188	48.92%	3,292	Mohd Zulkifli Zakaria (PH–PPBM)	4,880	6.60%	73,964	Ahmad Marzuk Shaary (GS–PAS)
P026	Ketereh	65,238	Annuar Musa (BN–UMNO)	25,467	47.96%	4,626	Wan Ismail Wan Jusoh (GS–PAS)	20,841	39.24%	53,107	Annuar Musa (BN–UMNO)
P026	Ketereh	65,238	Annuar Musa (BN–UMNO)	25,467	47.96%	4,626	Mohd Radzi Md Jidin (PH–PPBM)	6,799	12.80%	53,107	Annuar Musa (BN–UMNO)
P027	Tanah Merah	73,172	Ikmal Hisham Abdul Aziz (BN–UMNO)	28,152	48.43%	2,929	Johari Mat (GS–PAS)	25,223	43.40%	58,122	Ikmal Hisham Abdul Aziz (BN–UMNO)
P027	Tanah Merah	73,172	Ikmal Hisham Abdul Aziz (BN–UMNO)	28,152	48.43%	2,929	Mohamad Fauzi Zakaria (PH–PKR)	4,747	8.17%	58,122	Ikmal Hisham Abdul Aziz (BN–UMNO)
P028	Pasir Puteh	85,411	Nik Muhammad Zawawi Salleh (GS–PAS)	32,307	47.41%	1,360	Asyraf Wajdi Dusuki (BN–UMNO)	30,947	45.41%	68,150	Nik Mazian Nik Mohamad (GS–PAS)
P028	Pasir Puteh	85,411	Nik Muhammad Zawawi Salleh (GS–PAS)	32,307	47.41%	1,360	Kamaruddin Mohd Noor (PH–PPBM)	4,896	7.18%	68,150	Nik Mazian Nik Mohamad (GS–PAS)
P029	Machang	68,387	Ahmad Jazlan Yaakub (BN–UMNO)	26,076	47.39%	2,824	Zulkifli Mamat (GS–PAS)	23,252	42.26%	55,023	Ahmad Jazlan Yaakub (BN–UMNO)
P029	Machang	68,387	Ahmad Jazlan Yaakub (BN–UMNO)	26,076	47.39%	2,824	Sazmi Miah (PH–PPBM)	5,695	10.35%	55,023	Ahmad Jazlan Yaakub (BN–UMNO)
P030	Jeli	47,470	Mustapa Mohamed (BN–UMNO)	21,665	55.89%	6,647	Mohamad Hamid (GS–PAS)	15,018	38.75%	38,761	Mustapa Mohamed (BN–UMNO)
P030	Jeli	47,470	Mustapa Mohamed (BN–UMNO)	21,665	55.89%	6,647	Azran Deraman (PH–PPBM)	2,078	5.36%	38,761	Mustapa Mohamed (BN–UMNO)
P031	Kuala Krai	70,348	Ab Latiff Ab Rahman (GS–PAS)	28,903	52.56%	7,992	Ramzi Ab Rahman (BN–UMNO)	20,911	38.03%	54,987	Mohd Hatta Md Ramli (PH–AMANAH)
P031	Kuala Krai	70,348	Ab Latiff Ab Rahman (GS–PAS)	28,903	52.56%	7,992	Mohd Yazid Abdullah (PH–AMANAH)	5,173	9.41%	54,987	Mohd Hatta Md Ramli (PH–AMANAH)
P032	Gua Musang	52,524	Tengku Razaleigh Hamzah (BN–UMNO)	19,426	48.65%	3,913	Abdullah Hussein (GS–PAS)	15,513	38.84%	39,936	Tengku Razaleigh Hamzah (BN–UMNO)
P032	Gua Musang	52,524	Tengku Razaleigh Hamzah (BN–UMNO)	19,426	48.65%	3,913	Mohd Nor Hussin (PH–PPBM)	4,997	12.51%	39,936	Tengku Razaleigh Hamzah (BN–UMNO)

== Terengganu ==
#	Constituency	Registered Electors	Winner	Votes	Votes %	Majority	Opponent(s)	Votes	Votes %	Total valid votes	Incumbent
GS 6 | BN 2 | PH 0 | Independent 0
P033	Besut	86,627	Idris Jusoh (BN–UMNO)	34,335	48.40%	4,599	Riduan Mohamad Nor (GS–PAS)	29,736	41.92%	70,935	Idris Jusoh (BN–UMNO)
P033	Besut	86,627	Idris Jusoh (BN–UMNO)	34,335	48.40%	4,599	Wan Nazari Wan Jusoh (PH–PPBM)	6,864	9.68%	70,935	Idris Jusoh (BN–UMNO)
P034	Setiu	86,247	Shaharizukirnain Abd. Kadir (GS–PAS)	35,020	48.65%	2,802	Mohd Jidin Shafee (BN–UMNO)	32,218	44.76%	71,978	Che Mohamad Zulkifly Jusoh (BN–UMNO)
P034	Setiu	86,247	Shaharizukirnain Abd. Kadir (GS–PAS)	35,020	48.65%	2,802	Mohd Faudzi Musa (PH–PPBM)	4,740	6.59%	71,978	Che Mohamad Zulkifly Jusoh (BN–UMNO)
P035	Kuala Nerus	83,663	Mohd Khairuddin Aman Razali (GS–PAS)	37,974	52.66%	8,447	Tengku Asmadi Tengku Mohamad (BN–UMNO)	29,527	40.95%	72,105	Mohd Khairuddin Aman Razali (GS–PAS)
P035	Kuala Nerus	83,663	Mohd Khairuddin Aman Razali (GS–PAS)	37,974	52.66%	8,447	Abdullah Muhamad (PH–AMANAH)	4,604	6.39%	72,105	Mohd Khairuddin Aman Razali (GS–PAS)
P036	Kuala Terengganu	103,611	Ahmad Amzad Mohamed @ Hashim (GS–PAS)	42,988	49.65%	14,773	Wan Nawawi Wan Ismail (BN–UMNO)	28,215	32.59%	86,583	Raja Kamarul Bahrin Shah Raja Ahmad (PH–AMANAH)
P036	Kuala Terengganu	103,611	Ahmad Amzad Mohamed @ Hashim (GS–PAS)	42,988	49.65%	14,773	Raja Kamarul Bahrin Shah Raja Ahmad (PH–AMANAH)	15,380	17.76%	86,583	Raja Kamarul Bahrin Shah Raja Ahmad (PH–AMANAH)
P037	Marang	104,898	Abdul Hadi Awang (GS–PAS)	53,749	59.27%	21,954	Mohamad Nor Endut (BN–UMNO)	31,795	35.06%	90,682	Abdul Hadi Awang (GS–PAS)
P037	Marang	104,898	Abdul Hadi Awang (GS–PAS)	53,749	59.27%	21,954	Zarawi Sulong (PH–AMANAH)	5,138	5.67%	90,682	Abdul Hadi Awang (GS–PAS)
P038	Hulu Terengganu	73,487	Rosol Wahid (BN–UMNO)	30,925	49.60%	2,868	Muhyiddin Ab Rashid (GS–PAS)	28,057	45.00%	62,346	Jailani Johari (BN–UMNO)
P038	Hulu Terengganu	73,487	Rosol Wahid (BN–UMNO)	30,925	49.60%	2,868	Razali Idris (PH–PPBM)	3,364	5.40%	62,346	Jailani Johari (BN–UMNO)
P039	Dungun	90,506	Wan Hassan Mohd Ramli (GS–PAS)	40,850	54.17%	13,119	Din Adam (BN–UMNO)	27,731	36.77%	75,414	Wan Hassan Mohd Ramli (GS–PAS)
P039	Dungun	90,506	Wan Hassan Mohd Ramli (GS–PAS)	40,850	54.17%	13,119	Abd Rahman Yusof (PH–PKR)	6,833	9.06%	75,414	Wan Hassan Mohd Ramli (GS–PAS)
P040	Kemaman	107,593	Che Alias Hamid (GS–PAS)	39,878	44.06%	2,163	Ahmad Shabery Cheek (BN–UMNO)	37,715	41.67%	90,504	Ahmad Shabery Cheek (BN–UMNO)
P040	Kemaman	107,593	Che Alias Hamid (GS–PAS)	39,878	44.06%	2,163	Mohd Huzaifah Md Suhaimi (PH–PKR)	12,911	14.27%	90,504	Ahmad Shabery Cheek (BN–UMNO)

== Penang ==
#	Constituency	Registered Electors	Winner	Votes	Votes %	Majority	Opponent(s)	Votes	Votes %	Total valid votes	Incumbent
P041	Kepala Batas	60,523	Reezal Merican Naina Merican (BN–UMNO)	22,459	42.94%	4,736	Zaidi Zakaria (PH–AMANAH)	17,723	33.89%	52,302	Reezal Merican Naina Merican (BN–UMNO)
P041	Kepala Batas	60,523	Reezal Merican Naina Merican (BN–UMNO)	22,459	42.94%	4,736	Siti Mastura Mohamad (GS–PAS)	12,120	23.17%	52,302	Reezal Merican Naina Merican (BN–UMNO)
P042	Tasek Gelugor	60,850	Shabudin Yahaya (BN–UMNO)	18,547	35.73%	81	Marzuki Yahya (PH–PPBM)	18,466	35.58%	51,904	Shabudin Yahaya (BN–UMNO)
P042	Tasek Gelugor	60,850	Shabudin Yahaya (BN–UMNO)	18,547	35.73%	81	Rizal Hafiz Ruslan (GS–PAS)	14,891	28.69%	51,904	Shabudin Yahaya (BN–UMNO)
P043	Bagan	71,583	Lim Guan Eng (PH–DAP)	51,653	85.96%	43,902	Michael Lee Beng Seng (BN–MCA)	7,751	12.90%	60,087	Lim Guan Eng (PH–DAP)
P043	Bagan	71,583	Lim Guan Eng (PH–DAP)	51,653	85.96%	43,902	Huan Cheng Guan (PCM)	502	0.84%	60,087	Lim Guan Eng (PH–DAP)
P043	Bagan	71,583	Lim Guan Eng (PH–DAP)	51,653	85.96%	43,902	Koay Xing Boon (MUP)	181	0.30%	60,087	Lim Guan Eng (PH–DAP)
P044	Permatang Pauh	81,789	Nurul Izzah Anwar (PH–PKR)	35,534	50.89%	15,668	Mohd Zaidi Mohd Said (BN–UMNO)	19,866	28.45%	69,828	Wan Azizah Wan Ismail (PH–PKR)
P044	Permatang Pauh	81,789	Nurul Izzah Anwar (PH–PKR)	35,534	50.89%	15,668	Afnan Hamimi Taib Azamudden (GS–PAS)	14,428	20.66%	69,828	Wan Azizah Wan Ismail (PH–PKR)
P045	Bukit Mertajam	88,998	Steven Sim Chee Keong (PH–DAP)	63,784	85.40%	52,877	Gui Guat Lye (BN–MCA)	10,907	14.60%	74,691	Steven Sim Chee Keong (PH–DAP)
P046	Batu Kawan	65,394	Kasthuriraani Patto (PH–DAP)	42,683	78.02%	33,553	Jayanthi Devi Balaguru (BN–GERAKAN)	9,130	16.69%	54,705	Kasthuriraani Patto (PH–DAP)
P046	Batu Kawan	65,394	Kasthuriraani Patto (PH–DAP)	42,683	78.02%	33,553	Jay Kumar Balakrishnan (GS–PAS)	2,636	4.82%	54,705	Kasthuriraani Patto (PH–DAP)
P046	Batu Kawan	65,394	Kasthuriraani Patto (PH–DAP)	42,683	78.02%	33,553	Patrick Ooi Khar Giap (PFP)	256	0.47%	54,705	Kasthuriraani Patto (PH–DAP)
P047	Nibong Tebal	73,383	Mansor Othman (PH–PKR)	35,395	56.92%	15,817	Shaik Hussein Mydin (BN–UMNO)	19,578	31.49%	62,179	Mansor Othman (PH–PKR)
P047	Nibong Tebal	73,383	Mansor Othman (PH–PKR)	35,395	56.92%	15,817	Mohd Helmi Harun (GS–PAS)	6,875	11.06%	62,179	Mansor Othman (PH–PKR)
P047	Nibong Tebal	73,383	Mansor Othman (PH–PKR)	35,395	56.92%	15,817	Tan Tee Beng (IND)	331	0.53%	62,179	Mansor Othman (PH–PKR)
P048	Bukit Bendera	75,069	Wong Hon Wai (PH–DAP)	50,049	83.82%	40,731	Andy Yong Kim Seng (BN–GERAKAN)	9,318	15.61%	59,706	Zairil Khir Johari (PH–DAP)
P048	Bukit Bendera	75,069	Wong Hon Wai (PH–DAP)	50,049	83.82%	40,731	Tan Gim Theam (MUP)	339	0.57%	59,706	Zairil Khir Johari (PH–DAP)
P049	Tanjong	49,586	Chow Kon Yeow (PH–DAP)	34,663	87.25%	29,599	Ng Siew Lai (BN–GERAKAN)	5,064	12.75%	39,727	Ng Wei Aik (PH–DAP)
P050	Jelutong	76,991	Sanisvara Nethaji Rayer Rajaji (PH–DAP)	50,700	79.63%	38,171	Baljit Singh Jigiri Singh (BN–GERAKAN)	12,529	19.68%	63,666	Jeff Ooi Chuan Aun (PH–DAP)
P050	Jelutong	76,991	Sanisvara Nethaji Rayer Rajaji (PH–DAP)	50,700	79.63%	38,171	Tan Sim Bee (MUP)	437	0.69%	63,666	Jeff Ooi Chuan Aun (PH–DAP)
P051	Bukit Gelugor	91,595	Ramkarpal Singh Deo (PH–DAP)	65,622	86.69%	55,951	Low Joo Hiap (BN–MCA)	9,671	12.77%	75,705	Ramkarpal Singh Deo (PH–DAP)
P051	Bukit Gelugor	91,595	Ramkarpal Singh Deo (PH–DAP)	65,622	86.69%	55,951	Lai Xue Ching (MUP)	412	0.54%	75,705	Ramkarpal Singh Deo (PH–DAP)
P052	Bayan Baru	90,780	Sim Tze Tzin (PH–PKR)	51,555	68.88%	37,751	Saw Yee Fung (BN–MCA)	13,804	18.44%	74,849	Sim Tze Tzin (PH–PKR)
P052	Bayan Baru	90,780	Sim Tze Tzin (PH–PKR)	51,555	68.88%	37,751	Iszuree Ibrahim (GS–PAS)	8,757	11.70%	74,849	Sim Tze Tzin (PH–PKR)
P052	Bayan Baru	90,780	Sim Tze Tzin (PH–PKR)	51,555	68.88%	37,751	Yim Boon Leong (MUP)	733	0.98%	74,849	Sim Tze Tzin (PH–PKR)
P053	Balik Pulau	59,086	Muhammad Bakhtiar Wan Chik (PH–PKR)	25,471	51.17%	6,464	Hilmi Yahaya (BN–UMNO)	19,007	38.19%	49,776	Hilmi Yahaya (BN–UMNO)
P053	Balik Pulau	59,086	Muhammad Bakhtiar Wan Chik (PH–PKR)	25,471	51.17%	6,464	Muhammad Imran Muhammad Saad (GS–PAS)	5,298	10.64%	49,776	Hilmi Yahaya (BN–UMNO)

== Perak ==
#	Constituency	Registered Electors	Winner	Votes	Votes %	Majority	Opponent(s)	Votes	Votes %	Total valid votes	Incumbent
PH 13 | BN 11 | GS 0 | Independent 0
P054	Gerik	35,903	Hasbullah Osman (BN–UMNO)	13,243	48.49%	5,528	Mohd Dahalan Ismail (GS–PAS)	7,715	28.25%	27,311	Hasbullah Osman (BN–UMNO)
P054	Gerik	35,903	Hasbullah Osman (BN–UMNO)	13,243	48.49%	5,528	Ibrahim Mohd Hanafiah (PH–PPBM)	6,353	23.26%	27,311	Hasbullah Osman (BN–UMNO)
P055	Lenggong	29,752	Shamsul Anuar Nasarah (BN–UMNO)	12,523	53.97%	5,773	Muhammad Mujahid Mohamed Fadzil (GS–PAS)	6,750	29.09%	23,205	Shamsul Anuar Nasarah (BN–UMNO)
P055	Lenggong	29,752	Shamsul Anuar Nasarah (BN–UMNO)	12,523	53.97%	5,773	Amirul Fairuzzeen Jamaluddin (PH–PPBM)	3,932	16.94%	23,205	Shamsul Anuar Nasarah (BN–UMNO)
P056	Larut	49,453	Hamzah Zainudin (BN–UMNO)	18,184	45.90%	4,486	Abu Hussin Muhamad (GS–PAS)	13,698	34.57%	39,620	Hamzah Zainudin (BN–UMNO)
P056	Larut	49,453	Hamzah Zainudin (BN–UMNO)	18,184	45.90%	4,486	Khairil Anuar Akhiruddin (PH–PPBM)	7,738	19.53%	39,620	Hamzah Zainudin (BN–UMNO)
P057	Parit Buntar	51,860	Mujahid Yusof Rawa (PH–AMANAH)	16,753	39.22%	3,098	Abdul Puhat Mat Nayan (BN–UMNO)	13,655	31.96%	42,720	Mujahid Yusof Rawa (PH–AMANAH)
P057	Parit Buntar	51,860	Mujahid Yusof Rawa (PH–AMANAH)	16,753	39.22%	3,098	Ahmad Azhar Sharin (GS–PAS)	12,312	28.82%	42,720	Mujahid Yusof Rawa (PH–AMANAH)
P058	Bagan Serai	59,293	Noor Azmi Ghazali (BN–UMNO)	17,220	36.44%	172	Rohaya Bakar (GS–PAS)	17,048	36.08%	47,255	Noor Azmi Ghazali (BN–UMNO)
P058	Bagan Serai	59,293	Noor Azmi Ghazali (BN–UMNO)	17,220	36.44%	172	Adam Asmuni (PH–PPBM)	12,987	27.48%	47,255	Noor Azmi Ghazali (BN–UMNO)
P059	Bukit Gantang	69,873	Syed Abu Hussin Hafiz Syed Abdul Fasal (BN–UMNO)	22,450	39.48%	4,089	Khadri Khalid (PH–PPBM)	18,361	32.29%	56,863	Idris Ahmad (GS–PAS)
P059	Bukit Gantang	69,873	Syed Abu Hussin Hafiz Syed Abdul Fasal (BN–UMNO)	22,450	39.48%	4,089	Idris Ahmad (GS–PAS)	16,052	28.23%	56,863	Idris Ahmad (GS–PAS)
P060	Taiping	90,729	Teh Kok Lim (PH–DAP)	42,997	61.65%	27,384	Tan Keng Liang (BN–GERAKAN)	15,613	22.39%	69,743	Nga Kor Ming (PH–DAP)
P060	Taiping	90,729	Teh Kok Lim (PH–DAP)	42,997	61.65%	27,384	Ibrahim Ismail (GS–BERJASA)	11,133	15.96%	69,743	Nga Kor Ming (PH–DAP)
P061	Padang Rengas	30,996	Mohamed Nazri Abdul Aziz (BN–UMNO)	10,491	41.50%	2,548	Ejazi Yahaya (PH–PKR)	7,943	31.42%	25,281	Mohamed Nazri Abdul Aziz (BN–UMNO)
P061	Padang Rengas	30,996	Mohamed Nazri Abdul Aziz (BN–UMNO)	10,491	41.50%	2,548	Mohd Azalan Mohamed Radzi (GS–PAS)	6,847	27.08%	25,281	Mohamed Nazri Abdul Aziz (BN–UMNO)
P062	Sungai Siput	55,002	Kesavan Subramaniam (PH–PKR)	20,817	48.72%	5,607	Devamany S. Krishnasamy (BN–MIC)	15,210	35.60%	42,726	Michael Jeyakumar Devaraj (PSM)
P062	Sungai Siput	55,002	Kesavan Subramaniam (PH–PKR)	20,817	48.72%	5,607	Ishak Ibrahim (GS–PAS)	5,194	12.16%	42,726	Michael Jeyakumar Devaraj (PSM)
P062	Sungai Siput	55,002	Kesavan Subramaniam (PH–PKR)	20,817	48.72%	5,607	Michael Jeyakumar Devaraj (PSM)	1,505	3.52%	42,726	Michael Jeyakumar Devaraj (PSM)
P063	Tambun	107,763	Ahmad Faizal Azumu (PH–PPBM)	38,661	44.46%	5,320	Ahmad Husni Mohamed Hanadzlah (BN–UMNO)	33,341	38.35%	86,950	Ahmad Husni Mohamed Hanadzlah (BN–UMNO)
P063	Tambun	107,763	Ahmad Faizal Azumu (PH–PPBM)	38,661	44.46%	5,320	Muhamad Zulkifli Mohd Zakaria (GS–PAS)	14,948	17.19%	86,950	Ahmad Husni Mohamed Hanadzlah (BN–UMNO)
P064	Ipoh Timor	91,486	Wong Kah Woh (PH–DAP)	56,519	80.46%	42,797	Kathleen Wong Mei Yin (BN–MCA)	13,722	19.54%	70,241	Thomas Su Keong Siong (PH–DAP)
P065	Ipoh Barat	84,874	Kulasegaran Murugeson (PH–DAP)	55,613	84.90%	45,724	Cheng Wei Yee (BN–MCA)	9,889	15.10%	65,502	Kulasegaran Murugeson (PH–DAP)
P066	Batu Gajah	81,399	Sivakumar Varatharaju Naidu (PH–DAP)	52,850	84.17%	43,868	Leong Chee Wai (BN–MCA)	8,982	14.31%	62,787	Sivakumar Varatharaju Naidu (PH–DAP)
P066	Batu Gajah	81,399	Sivakumar Varatharaju Naidu (PH–DAP)	52,850	84.17%	43,868	Kunasekaran Krishnan (PSM)	955	1.52%	62,787	Sivakumar Varatharaju Naidu (PH–DAP)
P067	Kuala Kangsar	36,954	Mastura Mohd Yazid (BN–UMNO)	12,102	40.27%	731	Ahmad Termizi Ramli (PH–AMANAH)	11,371	37.83%	30,056	Mastura Mohd Yazid (BN–UMNO)
P067	Kuala Kangsar	36,954	Mastura Mohd Yazid (BN–UMNO)	12,102	40.27%	731	Khalil Idham Lim Abdullah @ Lim Chuan Hing (GS–PAS)	6,583	21.90%	30,056	Mastura Mohd Yazid (BN–UMNO)
P068	Beruas	79,794	Ngeh Koo Ham (PH–DAP)	41,231	68.41%	27,954	Pang Chok King (BN–GERAKAN)	13,277	22.03%	60,267	Ngeh Koo Ham (PH–DAP)
P068	Beruas	79,794	Ngeh Koo Ham (PH–DAP)	41,231	68.41%	27,954	Mohamad Nazeer M. K. M. Hameed (GS–PAS)	5,759	9.56%	60,267	Ngeh Koo Ham (PH–DAP)
P069	Parit	35,910	Mohd Nizar Zakaria (BN–UMNO)	14,035	48.42%	6,320	Najihatussalehah Ahmad (GS–PAS)	7,715	26.61%	28,990	Mohamad Zaim Abu Hassan (BN–UMNO)
P069	Parit	35,910	Mohd Nizar Zakaria (BN–UMNO)	14,035	48.42%	6,320	Ahmad Tarmizi Mohd Jam (PH–AMANAH)	7,240	24.97%	28,990	Mohamad Zaim Abu Hassan (BN–UMNO)
P070	Kampar	69,436	Thomas Su Keong Siong (PH–DAP)	30,216	57.56%	11,801	Lee Chee Leong (BN–MCA)	18,415	35.08%	52,495	Ko Chung Sen (PH–DAP)
P070	Kampar	69,436	Thomas Su Keong Siong (PH–DAP)	30,216	57.56%	11,801	Yougan Mahalingam (GS–PAS)	3,864	7.36%	52,495	Ko Chung Sen (PH–DAP)
P071	Gopeng	99,167	Lee Boon Chye (PH–PKR)	48,923	61.75%	29,778	Heng Seai Kie (BN–MCA)	19,145	24.16%	79,233	Lee Boon Chye (PH–PKR)
P071	Gopeng	99,167	Lee Boon Chye (PH–PKR)	48,923	61.75%	29,778	Ismail Ariffin (GS–PAS)	11,165	14.09%	79,233	Lee Boon Chye (PH–PKR)
P072	Tapah	47,128	Saravanan Murugan (BN–MIC)	16,086	44.47%	614	Mohamed Azni Mohamed Ali (PH–PPBM)	15,472	42.77%	36,174	Saravanan Murugan (BN–MIC)
P072	Tapah	47,128	Saravanan Murugan (BN–MIC)	16,086	44.47%	614	Norazli Musa (GS–PAS)	4,616	12.76%	36,174	Saravanan Murugan (BN–MIC)
P073	Pasir Salak	54,671	Tajuddin Abdul Rahman (BN–UMNO)	20,003	46.04%	7,712	Salihuddin Radin Sumadi (PH–PPBM)	12,291	28.29%	43,445	Tajuddin Abdul Rahman (BN–UMNO)
P073	Pasir Salak	54,671	Tajuddin Abdul Rahman (BN–UMNO)	20,003	46.04%	7,712	Zafarul Azhan Zan (GS–PAS)	11,151	25.67%	43,445	Tajuddin Abdul Rahman (BN–UMNO)
P074	Lumut	67,157	Mohd Hatta Md Ramli (PH–AMANAH)	21,955	40.93%	400	Zambry Abdul Kadir (BN–UMNO)	21,555	40.18%	53,645	Mohamad Imran Abd Hamid (PH–PKR)
P074	Lumut	67,157	Mohd Hatta Md Ramli (PH–AMANAH)	21,955	40.93%	400	Mohd Zamri Ibrahim (GS–PAS)	10,135	18.89%	53,645	Mohamad Imran Abd Hamid (PH–PKR)
P075	Bagan Datuk	47,309	Ahmad Zahid Hamidi (BN–UMNO)	18,909	51.38%	5,073	Pakhrurrazi Arshad (PH–PKR)	13,836	37.59%	36,806	Ahmad Zahid Hamidi (BN–UMNO)
P075	Bagan Datuk	47,309	Ahmad Zahid Hamidi (BN–UMNO)	18,909	51.38%	5,073	Ata Abdul Munim Hasan Adli (GS–PAS)	4,061	11.03%	36,806	Ahmad Zahid Hamidi (BN–UMNO)
P076	Teluk Intan	66,487	Nga Kor Ming (PH–DAP)	29,170	54.37%	11,179	Mah Siew Keong (BN–GERAKAN)	17,991	33.53%	53,655	Mah Siew Keong (BN–GERAKAN)
P076	Teluk Intan	66,487	Nga Kor Ming (PH–DAP)	29,170	54.37%	11,179	Ahmad Ramadzan Ahmad Daud (GS–PAS)	6,494	12.10%	53,655	Mah Siew Keong (BN–GERAKAN)
P077	Tanjong Malim	68,468	Chang Lih Kang (PH–PKR)	24,672	45.44%	5,358	Mah Hang Soon (BN–MCA)	19,314	35.57%	54,297	Ong Ka Chuan (BN–MCA)
P077	Tanjong Malim	68,468	Chang Lih Kang (PH–PKR)	24,672	45.44%	5,358	Mohd Tarmizi Abd Rahman (GS–PAS)	10,311	18.99%	54,297	Ong Ka Chuan (BN–MCA)

== Pahang ==
#	Constituency	Registered Electors	Winner	Votes	Votes %	Majority	Opponent(s)	Votes	Votes %	Total valid votes	Incumbent
BN 9 | PH 5 | GS 0 | Independent 0
P078	Cameron Highlands	32,048	Sivarraajh N. Chandran (BN–MIC)	10,307	42.31%	597	Manogaran M. Marimuthu (PH–DAP)	9,710	39.85%	24,365	Palanivel K. Govindasamy (IND)
P078	Cameron Highlands	32,048	Sivarraajh N. Chandran (BN–MIC)	10,307	42.31%	597	Wan Mahadir Wan Mahmud (GS–PAS)	3,587	14.72%	24,365	Palanivel K. Govindasamy (IND)
P078	Cameron Highlands	32,048	Sivarraajh N. Chandran (BN–MIC)	10,307	42.31%	597	Suresh Kumar Balasubramaniam (PSM)	680	2.79%	24,365	Palanivel K. Govindasamy (IND)
P078	Cameron Highlands	32,048	Sivarraajh N. Chandran (BN–MIC)	10,307	42.31%	597	Mohd Tahir Kassim (GS–BERJASA)	81	0.33%	24,365	Palanivel K. Govindasamy (IND)
P079	Lipis	35,294	Abdul Rahman Mohamad (BN–UMNO)	13,995	49.82%	6,569	Badarudin Abd Rahaman (PH–PPBM)	7,426	26.43%	28,092	Abdul Rahman Mohamad (BN–UMNO)
P079	Lipis	35,294	Abdul Rahman Mohamad (BN–UMNO)	13,995	49.82%	6,569	Sobirin Duli (GS–PAS)	6,671	23.75%	28,092	Abdul Rahman Mohamad (BN–UMNO)
P080	Raub	57,723	Tengku Zulpuri Shah Raja Puji (PH–DAP)	20,659	44.89%	3,159	Chew Mei Fun (BN–MCA)	17,500	38.02%	46,025	Mohd Ariff Sabri Abd Aziz (PH–DAP)
P080	Raub	57,723	Tengku Zulpuri Shah Raja Puji (PH–DAP)	20,659	44.89%	3,159	Mohamed Nilam Abdul Manap (GS–PAS)	7,866	17.09%	46,025	Mohd Ariff Sabri Abd Aziz (PH–DAP)
P081	Jerantut	63,609	Ahmad Nazlan Idris (BN–UMNO)	22,640	45.05%	5,908	Yohanis Ahmad (GS–PAS)	16,732	33.30%	50,249	Ahmad Nazlan Idris (BN–UMNO)
P081	Jerantut	63,609	Ahmad Nazlan Idris (BN–UMNO)	22,640	45.05%	5,908	Wan Mohd Shahrir Wan Abd Jalil (PH–PPBM)	10,877	21.65%	50,249	Ahmad Nazlan Idris (BN–UMNO)
P082	Indera Mahkota	77,208	Saifuddin Abdullah (PH–PKR)	28,578	44.85%	10,950	Johan Mat Sah (BN–UMNO)	17,628	27.66%	63,721	Fauzi Abdul Rahman (PH–PKR)
P082	Indera Mahkota	77,208	Saifuddin Abdullah (PH–PKR)	28,578	44.85%	10,950	Nasrudin Hasan (GS–PAS)	17,515	27.49%	63,721	Fauzi Abdul Rahman (PH–PKR)
P083	Kuantan	62,696	Fuziah Salleh (PH–PKR)	22,807	44.57%	8,111	Sulaiman Mat Derus (GS–PAS)	14,696	28.72%	51,170	Fuziah Salleh (PH–PKR)
P083	Kuantan	62,696	Fuziah Salleh (PH–PKR)	22,807	44.57%	8,111	Andrew Wong Kiew Lee (BN–MCA)	13,667	26.71%	51,170	Fuziah Salleh (PH–PKR)
P084	Paya Besar	55,135	Mohd. Shahar Abdullah (BN–UMNO)	19,033	43.16%	5,742	Mohamad Azhar Mohd Noor (GS–PAS)	13,291	30.14%	44,100	VAC
P084	Paya Besar	55,135	Mohd. Shahar Abdullah (BN–UMNO)	19,033	43.16%	5,742	Mohd Ashraf Mustaqim Badrul Munir (PH–PPBM)	11,776	26.70%	44,100	VAC
P085	Pekan	88,899	Mohd Najib Abdul Razak (BN–UMNO)	43,854	62.10%	24,859	Ahiatudin Daud (GS–PAS)	18,995	26.90%	70,614	Mohd Najib Abdul Razak (BN–UMNO)
P085	Pekan	88,899	Mohd Najib Abdul Razak (BN–UMNO)	43,854	62.10%	24,859	Muhammad Zahid Md Arip (PH–PPBM)	7,662	10.85%	70,614	Mohd Najib Abdul Razak (BN–UMNO)
P085	Pekan	88,899	Mohd Najib Abdul Razak (BN–UMNO)	43,854	62.10%	24,859	Abd Kadir Sainudin (IND)	103	0.15%	70,614	Mohd Najib Abdul Razak (BN–UMNO)
P086	Maran	41,036	Ismail Abdul Muttalib (BN–UMNO)	16,064	49.09%	3,763	Hasenan Haron (GS–PAS)	12,301	37.59%	32,725	Ismail Abdul Muttalib (BN–UMNO)
P086	Maran	41,036	Ismail Abdul Muttalib (BN–UMNO)	16,064	49.09%	3,763	Ahmad Farid Ahmad Nordin (PH–PPBM)	4,360	13.32%	32,725	Ismail Abdul Muttalib (BN–UMNO)
P087	Kuala Krau	47,264	Ismail Mohamed Said (BN–UMNO)	18,058	47.13%	2,876	Kamal Ashaari (GS–PAS)	15,182	39.63%	38,311	Ismail Mohamed Said (BN–UMNO)
P087	Kuala Krau	47,264	Ismail Mohamed Said (BN–UMNO)	18,058	47.13%	2,876	Mohamad Rafidee Hashim (PH–PPBM)	5,071	13.24%	38,311	Ismail Mohamed Said (BN–UMNO)
P088	Temerloh	75,081	Mohd Anuar Mohd Tahir (PH–AMANAH)	23,998	39.31%	1,904	Mohd Sharkar Shamsudin (BN–UMNO)	22,094	36.19%	61,050	Nasrudin Hasan (GS–PAS)
P088	Temerloh	75,081	Mohd Anuar Mohd Tahir (PH–AMANAH)	23,998	39.31%	1,904	Md Jusoh Darus (GS–PAS)	14,734	24.13%	61,050	Nasrudin Hasan (GS–PAS)
P088	Temerloh	75,081	Mohd Anuar Mohd Tahir (PH–AMANAH)	23,998	39.31%	1,904	Mohd Khaidir Ahmad (IND)	178	0.29%	61,050	Nasrudin Hasan (GS–PAS)
P088	Temerloh	75,081	Mohd Anuar Mohd Tahir (PH–AMANAH)	23,998	39.31%	1,904	Muhamad Fakhrudin Abu Hanipah (IND)	46	0.08%	61,050	Nasrudin Hasan (GS–PAS)
P089	Bentong	67,359	Wong Tack (PH–DAP)	25,716	46.67%	2,032	Liow Tiong Lai (BN–MCA)	23,684	42.98%	55,106	Liow Tiong Lai (BN–MCA)
P089	Bentong	67,359	Wong Tack (PH–DAP)	25,716	46.67%	2,032	Balasubramaniam K. Nachiappan (GS–PAS)	5,706	10.35%	55,106	Liow Tiong Lai (BN–MCA)
P090	Bera	58,711	Ismail Sabri Yaakob (BN–UMNO)	20,760	43.89%	2,311	Zakaria Ab Hamid (PH–PKR)	18,449	39.00%	47,305	Ismail Sabri Yaakob (BN–UMNO)
P090	Bera	58,711	Ismail Sabri Yaakob (BN–UMNO)	20,760	43.89%	2,311	Musaniff Rahman (GS–PAS)	8,096	17.11%	47,305	Ismail Sabri Yaakob (BN–UMNO)
P091	Rompin	61,918	Hasan Arifin (BN–UMNO)	26,628	53.53%	11,395	Mohd Shahrul Nizam Abdul Haliff (GS–PAS)	15,233	30.63%	49,737	Hasan Arifin (BN–UMNO)
P091	Rompin	61,918	Hasan Arifin (BN–UMNO)	26,628	53.53%	11,395	Sitarunisah Ab Kadir (PH–PKR)	7,876	15.84%	49,737	Hasan Arifin (BN–UMNO)

== Selangor ==
#	Constituency	Registered Electors	Winner	Votes	Votes %	Majority	Opponent(s)	Votes	Votes %	Total valid votes	Incumbent
PH 20 | BN 2 | GS 0 | Independent 0
P092	Sabak Bernam	40,863	Mohamad Fasiah Mohd Fakeh (BN–UMNO)	12,862	38.56%	1,674	Warno Dogol (PH–PPBM)	11,188	33.55%	33,350	Mohamad Fasiah Mohd Fakeh (BN–UMNO)
P092	Sabak Bernam	40,863	Mohamad Fasiah Mohd Fakeh (BN–UMNO)	12,862	38.56%	1,674	Muhamad Labib Abd Jalil (GS–PAS)	9,300	27.89%	33,350	Mohamad Fasiah Mohd Fakeh (BN–UMNO)
P093	Sungai Besar	48,739	Muslimin Yahaya (PH–PPBM)	17,350	42.11%	714	Budiman Mohd Zohdi (BN–UMNO)	16,636	40.37%	41,206	Budiman Mohd Zohdi (BN–UMNO)
P093	Sungai Besar	48,739	Muslimin Yahaya (PH–PPBM)	17,350	42.11%	714	Mohamed Salleh M. Husin (GS–PAS)	7,220	17.52%	41,206	Budiman Mohd Zohdi (BN–UMNO)
P094	Hulu Selangor	100,990	June Leow Hsiad Hui (PH–PKR)	40,783	47.86%	13,391	Kamalanathan Panchanathan (BN–MIC)	27,392	32.14%	85,221	Kamalanathan Panchanathan (BN–MIC)
P094	Hulu Selangor	100,990	June Leow Hsiad Hui (PH–PKR)	40,783	47.86%	13,391	Wan Mat Wan Sulaiman (GS–PAS)	16,620	19.50%	85,221	Kamalanathan Panchanathan (BN–MIC)
P094	Hulu Selangor	100,990	June Leow Hsiad Hui (PH–PKR)	40,783	47.86%	13,391	Kumar S. S. Paramasivam (IND)	426	0.50%	85,221	Kamalanathan Panchanathan (BN–MIC)
P095	Tanjong Karang	47,198	Noh Omar (BN–UMNO)	17,596	43.45%	1,970	Zulkafperi Hanapi (PH–PPBM)	15,626	38.58%	40,498	Noh Omar (BN–UMNO)
P095	Tanjong Karang	47,198	Noh Omar (BN–UMNO)	17,596	43.45%	1,970	Nor Az Azlan Ahmad (GS–PAS)	7,276	17.97%	40,498	Noh Omar (BN–UMNO)
P096	Kuala Selangor	69,397	Dzulkefly Ahmad (PH–AMANAH)	29,842	49.97%	8,498	Irmohizam Ibrahim (BN–UMNO)	21,344	35.74%	59,721	Irmohizam Ibrahim (BN–UMNO)
P096	Kuala Selangor	69,397	Dzulkefly Ahmad (PH–AMANAH)	29,842	49.97%	8,498	Mohd Fakaruddin Ismail (GS–PAS)	8,535	14.29%	59,721	Irmohizam Ibrahim (BN–UMNO)
P097	Selayang	116,176	William Leong Jee Keen (PH–PKR)	60,158	61.38%	40,657	Kang Meng Fuat (BN–MCA)	19,501	19.90%	98,002	William Leong Jee Keen (PH–PKR)
P097	Selayang	116,176	William Leong Jee Keen (PH–PKR)	60,158	61.38%	40,657	Hashim Abd Karim (GS–BERJASA)	18,343	18.72%	98,002	William Leong Jee Keen (PH–PKR)
P098	Gombak	141,112	Mohamed Azmin Ali (PH–PKR)	75,113	63.10%	48,721	Abdul Rahim Pandak Kamarudin (BN–UMNO)	26,392	22.17%	119,042	Mohamed Azmin Ali (PH–PKR)
P098	Gombak	141,112	Mohamed Azmin Ali (PH–PKR)	75,113	63.10%	48,721	Khairil Nizam Khirudin (GS–PAS)	17,537	14.73%	119,042	Mohamed Azmin Ali (PH–PKR)
P099	Ampang	91,737	Zuraida Kamaruddin (PH–PKR)	54,307	70.95%	41,956	Leong Kim Soon (BN–MCA)	12,351	16.13%	76,550	Zuraida Kamaruddin (PH–PKR)
P099	Ampang	91,737	Zuraida Kamaruddin (PH–PKR)	54,307	70.95%	41,956	Nurul Islam Mohamed Yusoff (GS–PAS)	9,598	12.54%	76,550	Zuraida Kamaruddin (PH–PKR)
P099	Ampang	91,737	Zuraida Kamaruddin (PH–PKR)	54,307	70.95%	41,956	Tan Hua Meng (PRM)	294	0.38%	76,550	Zuraida Kamaruddin (PH–PKR)
P100	Pandan	101,319	Wan Azizah Wan Ismail (PH–PKR)	64,733	75.46%	52,543	Leong Kok Wee (BN–MCA)	12,190	14.21%	85,774	Rafizi Ramli (PH–PKR)
P100	Pandan	101,319	Wan Azizah Wan Ismail (PH–PKR)	64,733	75.46%	52,543	Mohamed Sukri Omar (GS–PAS)	8,336	9.72%	85,774	Rafizi Ramli (PH–PKR)
P100	Pandan	101,319	Wan Azizah Wan Ismail (PH–PKR)	64,733	75.46%	52,543	Jenice Lee Ying Ha (PRM)	442	0.52%	85,774	Rafizi Ramli (PH–PKR)
P100	Pandan	101,319	Wan Azizah Wan Ismail (PH–PKR)	64,733	75.46%	52,543	Mohd Khairul Azam Abdul Aziz (IND)	73	0.09%	85,774	Rafizi Ramli (PH–PKR)
P101	Hulu Langat	102,363	Hasanuddin Mohd Yunus (PH–AMANAH)	49,004	55.53%	25,424	Azman Ahmad (BN–UMNO)	23,580	26.72%	88,247	Che Rosli Che Mat (GS–PAS)
P101	Hulu Langat	102,363	Hasanuddin Mohd Yunus (PH–AMANAH)	49,004	55.53%	25,424	Che Rosli Che Mat (GS–PAS)	15,663	17.75%	88,247	Che Rosli Che Mat (GS–PAS)
P102	Bangi	178,790	Ong Kian Ming (PH–DAP)	102,557	65.61%	68,768	Mohd Shafie Ngah (GS–PAS)	33,789	21.61%	156,327	Ong Kian Ming (PH–DAP)
P102	Bangi	178,790	Ong Kian Ming (PH–DAP)	102,557	65.61%	68,768	Liew Yuen Keong (BN–MCA)	19,766	12.64%	156,327	Ong Kian Ming (PH–DAP)
P102	Bangi	178,790	Ong Kian Ming (PH–DAP)	102,557	65.61%	68,768	Dennis Wan Jinn Woei (PRM)	215	0.14%	156,327	Ong Kian Ming (PH–DAP)
P103	Puchong	96,437	Gobind Singh Deo (PH–DAP)	60,429	72.39%	47,635	Ang Chin Tat (BN–GERAKAN)	12,794	15.33%	83,478	Gobind Singh Deo (PH–DAP)
P103	Puchong	96,437	Gobind Singh Deo (PH–DAP)	60,429	72.39%	47,635	Mohamad Rosalizan Roslan (GS–PAS)	10,255	12.28%	83,478	Gobind Singh Deo (PH–DAP)
P104	Subang	146,422	Wong Chen (PH–PKR)	104,430	83.07%	92,353	Tan Seong Lim (BN–MCA)	12,077	9.61%	125,705	Wong Chen (PH–PKR)
P104	Subang	146,422	Wong Chen (PH–PKR)	104,430	83.07%	92,353	Mohd Shahir Mohd Adnan (GS–IKATAN)	9,025	7.18%	125,705	Wong Chen (PH–PKR)
P104	Subang	146,422	Wong Chen (PH–PKR)	104,430	83.07%	92,353	Toh Sin Wah (IND)	173	0.14%	125,705	Wong Chen (PH–PKR)
P105	Petaling Jaya	140,920	Maria Chin Abdullah (PH–PKR)	78,984	68.52%	57,137	Chew Hian Tat (BN–MCA)	21,847	18.95%	115,279	Hee Loy Sian (PH–PKR)
P105	Petaling Jaya	140,920	Maria Chin Abdullah (PH–PKR)	78,984	68.52%	57,137	Noraini Hussin (GS–PAS)	14,448	12.53%	115,279	Hee Loy Sian (PH–PKR)
P106	Damansara	164,322	Tony Pua Kiam Wee (PH–DAP)	121,283	89.00%	106,903	Ryan Ho Kwok Xheng (BN–MCA)	14,380	10.55%	136,280	Tony Pua Kiam Wee (PH–DAP)
P106	Damansara	164,322	Tony Pua Kiam Wee (PH–DAP)	121,283	89.00%	106,903	Wong Mun Kheong (PRM)	617	0.45%	136,280	Tony Pua Kiam Wee (PH–DAP)
P107	Sungai Buloh	90,707	Sivarasa Rasiah (PH–PKR)	43,631	55.98%	26,634	Nuridah Mohd Salleh (GS–PAS)	16,997	21.80%	77,951	Sivarasa Rasiah (PH–PKR)
P107	Sungai Buloh	90,707	Sivarasa Rasiah (PH–PKR)	43,631	55.98%	26,634	Prakash Rao Applanaidoo (BN–MIC)	16,681	21.40%	77,951	Sivarasa Rasiah (PH–PKR)
P107	Sungai Buloh	90,707	Sivarasa Rasiah (PH–PKR)	43,631	55.98%	26,634	Zainurizzaman Moharam (PSM)	642	0.82%	77,951	Sivarasa Rasiah (PH–PKR)
P108	Shah Alam	107,316	Khalid Abdul Samad (PH–AMANAH)	55,949	60.00%	33,849	Azhari Shaari (BN–UMNO)	22,100	23.70%	93,243	Khalid Abdul Samad (PH–AMANAH)
P108	Shah Alam	107,316	Khalid Abdul Samad (PH–AMANAH)	55,949	60.00%	33,849	Mohd Zuhdi Marzuki (GS–PAS)	15,194	16.30%	93,243	Khalid Abdul Samad (PH–AMANAH)
P109	Kapar	124,983	Abdullah Sani Abdul Hamid (PH–PKR)	47,731	44.99%	16,306	Abd Rani Osman (GS–PAS)	31,425	29.62%	106,093	Manivannan K. Gowindasamy (PH–PKR)
P109	Kapar	124,983	Abdullah Sani Abdul Hamid (PH–PKR)	47,731	44.99%	16,306	Mohana Muniandy Raman (BN–MIC)	26,412	24.90%	106,093	Manivannan K. Gowindasamy (PH–PKR)
P109	Kapar	124,983	Abdullah Sani Abdul Hamid (PH–PKR)	47,731	44.99%	16,306	Manikavasagam Sundram (PRM)	525	0.49%	106,093	Manivannan K. Gowindasamy (PH–PKR)
P110	Klang	149,348	Charles Anthony Santiago (PH–DAP)	98,279	77.34%	78,773	Ching Eu Boon (BN–MCA)	19,506	15.35%	127,074	Charles Anthony Santiago (PH–DAP)
P110	Klang	149,348	Charles Anthony Santiago (PH–DAP)	98,279	77.34%	78,773	Khairushah Kottapan Abdullah (GS–PAS)	9,169	7.22%	127,074	Charles Anthony Santiago (PH–DAP)
P110	Klang	149,348	Charles Anthony Santiago (PH–DAP)	98,279	77.34%	78,773	Puvananderan Ganasamoorthy (IND)	120	0.09%	127,074	Charles Anthony Santiago (PH–DAP)
P111	Kota Raja	149,021	Mohamad Sabu (PH–AMANAH)	90,697	70.79%	71,142	Mohamed Diah Baharun (GS–PAS)	19,555	15.26%	128,126	Siti Mariah Mahmud (PH–AMANAH)
P111	Kota Raja	149,021	Mohamad Sabu (PH–AMANAH)	90,697	70.79%	71,142	V. Gunalan (BN–MIC)	17,874	13.95%	128,126	Siti Mariah Mahmud (PH–AMANAH)
P112	Kuala Langat	102,406	Xavier Jayakumar Arulanandam (PH–PKR)	43,239	49.08%	17,112	Shahril Sufian Hamdan (BN–UMNO)	26,127	29.66%	88,097	Abdullah Sani Abdul Hamid (PH–PKR)
P112	Kuala Langat	102,406	Xavier Jayakumar Arulanandam (PH–PKR)	43,239	49.08%	17,112	Yahya Baba (GS–PAS)	18,731	21.26%	88,097	Abdullah Sani Abdul Hamid (PH–PKR)
P113	Sepang	104,508	Mohamed Hanipa Maidin (PH–AMANAH)	46,740	51.56%	18,705	Marsum Paing (BN–UMNO)	28,035	30.92%	90,657	Mohamed Hanipa Maidin (PH–AMANAH)
P113	Sepang	104,508	Mohamed Hanipa Maidin (PH–AMANAH)	46,740	51.56%	18,705	Sabirin Marsono (GS–PAS)	15,882	17.52%	90,657	Mohamed Hanipa Maidin (PH–AMANAH)

== Federal Territory of Kuala Lumpur ==
#	Constituency	Registered Electors	Winner	Votes	Votes %	Majority	Opponent(s)	Votes	Votes %	Total valid votes	Incumbent
PH 10 | BN 0 | GS 0 | Independent 1
P114	Kepong	72,696	Lim Lip Eng (PH–DAP)	56,516	92.04%	51,628	Ong Siang Liang (BN–GERAKAN)	4,888	7.96%	61,404	Tan Seng Giaw (PH–DAP)
P115	Batu	76,328	Prabakaran Parameswaran (IND)	38,125	60.71%	24,438	Dominic Lau Hoe Chai (BN–GERAKAN)	13,687	21.79%	62,805	Chua Tian Chang (PH–PKR)
P115	Batu	76,328	Prabakaran Parameswaran (IND)	38,125	60.71%	24,438	Azhar Yahya (GS–PAS)	10,610	16.89%	62,805	Chua Tian Chang (PH–PKR)
P115	Batu	76,328	Prabakaran Parameswaran (IND)	38,125	60.71%	24,438	Panjamothy V. Muthusamy (IND)	383	0.61%	62,805	Chua Tian Chang (PH–PKR)
P116	Wangsa Maju	88,482	Tan Yee Kew (PH–PKR)	42,178	57.30%	24,238	Yeow Teong Look (BN–MCA)	17,940	24.37%	73,608	Tan Kee Kwong (PH–PKR)
P116	Wangsa Maju	88,482	Tan Yee Kew (PH–PKR)	42,178	57.30%	24,238	Razali Tumiran (GS–PAS)	13,490	18.33%	73,608	Tan Kee Kwong (PH–PKR)
P117	Segambut	77,956	Hannah Yeoh Tseow Suan (PH–DAP)	53,124	82.07%	45,702	Loga Bala Mohan Jeganathan (BN–myPPP)	7,422	11.47%	64,727	Lim Lip Eng (PH–DAP)
P117	Segambut	77,956	Hannah Yeoh Tseow Suan (PH–DAP)	53,124	82.07%	45,702	Muhammad Soleh Abdul Razak (GS–PAS)	4,181	6.46%	64,727	Lim Lip Eng (PH–DAP)
P118	Setiawangsa	72,136	Nik Nazmi Nik Ahmad (PH–PKR)	34,471	56.65%	14,372	Zulhasnan Rafique (BN–UMNO)	20,099	33.03%	60,852	Ahmad Fauzi Zahari (BN–UMNO)
P118	Setiawangsa	72,136	Nik Nazmi Nik Ahmad (PH–PKR)	34,471	56.65%	14,372	Ubaid Abd Akla (GS–PAS)	6,282	10.32%	60,852	Ahmad Fauzi Zahari (BN–UMNO)
P119	Titiwangsa	61,598	Rina Mohd Harun (PH–PPBM)	23,840	47.31%	4,139	Johari Abdul Ghani (BN–UMNO)	19,701	39.10%	60,858	Johari Abdul Ghani (BN–UMNO)
P119	Titiwangsa	61,598	Rina Mohd Harun (PH–PPBM)	23,840	47.31%	4,139	Mohamad Noor Mohamad (GS–PAS)	6,845	13.59%	60,858	Johari Abdul Ghani (BN–UMNO)
P120	Bukit Bintang	69,526	Fong Kui Lun (PH–DAP)	44,516	84.94%	37,260	Ann Tan Ean Ean (BN–MCA)	7,256	13.85%	52,408	Fong Kui Lun (PH–DAP)
P120	Bukit Bintang	69,526	Fong Kui Lun (PH–DAP)	44,516	84.94%	37,260	Khairul Husni Othman (PFP)	636	1.21%	52,408	Fong Kui Lun (PH–DAP)
P121	Lembah Pantai	80,346	Ahmad Fahmi Mohamed Fadzil (PH–PKR)	33,313	50.24%	5,598	Raja Nong Chik Raja Zainal Abidin (BN–UMNO)	27,715	41.80%	66,305	Nurul Izzah Anwar (PH–PKR)
P121	Lembah Pantai	80,346	Ahmad Fahmi Mohamed Fadzil (PH–PKR)	33,313	50.24%	5,598	Fauzi Abu Bakar (GS–PAS)	5,277	7.96%	66,305	Nurul Izzah Anwar (PH–PKR)
P122	Seputeh	86,256	Teresa Kok Suh Sim (PH–DAP)	63,094	89.97%	56,059	Chan Quin Er (BN–MCA)	7,035	10.03%	70,129	Teresa Kok Suh Sim (PH–DAP)
P123	Cheras	78,819	Tan Kok Wai (PH–DAP)	56,671	89.00%	49,665	Heng Sinn Yee (BN–MCA)	7,006	11.00%	63,677	Tan Kok Wai (PH–DAP)
P124	Bandar Tun Razak	83,650	Kamarudin Jaffar (PH–PKR)	41,126	58.58%	19,930	Adnan Abu Seman (BN–UMNO)	21,196	30.19%	70,206	Abdul Khalid Ibrahim (IND)
P124	Bandar Tun Razak	83,650	Kamarudin Jaffar (PH–PKR)	41,126	58.58%	19,930	Rosni Adam (GS–PAS)	7,884	11.23%	70,206	Abdul Khalid Ibrahim (IND)

== Federal Territory of Putrajaya ==
#	Constituency	Registered Electors	Winner	Votes	Votes %	Majority	Opponent(s)	Votes	Votes %	Total valid votes	Incumbent
BN 1 | GS 0 | PH 0 | Independent 0
P125	Putrajaya	27,306	Tengku Adnan Tengku Mansor (BN–UMNO)	12,148	49.46%	3,372	Samsu Adabi Mamat (PH–PPBM)	8,776	35.74%	24,558	Tengku Adnan Tengku Mansor (BN–UMNO)
P125	Putrajaya	27,306	Tengku Adnan Tengku Mansor (BN–UMNO)	12,148	49.46%	3,372	Zainal Abidin Kidam (GS–PAS)	3,634	14.80%	24,558	Tengku Adnan Tengku Mansor (BN–UMNO)

== Negeri Sembilan ==
#	Constituency	Registered Electors	Winner	Votes	Votes %	Majority	Opponent(s)	Votes	Votes %	Total valid votes	Incumbent
PH 5 | BN 3 | GS 0 | Independent 0
P126	Jelebu	48,522	Jalaluddin Alias (BN–UMNO)	19,062	48.93%	2,045	Mustafar Abd. Kadir (PH–AMANAH)	17,017	43.68%	38,957	VAC
P126	Jelebu	48,522	Jalaluddin Alias (BN–UMNO)	19,062	48.93%	2,045	Norman Ipin (GS–PAS)	2,878	7.39%	38,957	VAC
P127	Jempol	72,122	Mohd Salim Mohd Shariff (BN–UMNO)	26,819	46.82%	1,631	Kamarulzaman Kamdias (PH–PPBM)	25,188	43.98%	57,274	Mohd Isa Abdul Samad (BN–UMNO)
P127	Jempol	72,122	Mohd Salim Mohd Shariff (BN–UMNO)	26,819	46.82%	1,631	Mustaffa Daharun (GS–PAS)	5,267	9.20%	57,274	Mohd Isa Abdul Samad (BN–UMNO)
P128	Seremban	110,168	Anthony Loke Siew Fook (PH–DAP)	55,503	60.45%	30,694	Chong Sin Woon (BN–MCA)	24,809	27.02%	91,818	Anthony Loke Siew Fook (PH–DAP)
P128	Seremban	110,168	Anthony Loke Siew Fook (PH–DAP)	55,503	60.45%	30,694	Shariffuddin Ahmad (GS–PAS)	11,506	12.53%	91,818	Anthony Loke Siew Fook (PH–DAP)
P129	Kuala Pilah	49,801	Eddin Syazlee Shith (PH–PPBM)	18,045	44.85%	200	Hassan Malek (BN–UMNO)	17,845	44.35%	40,237	Hassan Malek (BN–UMNO)
P129	Kuala Pilah	49,801	Eddin Syazlee Shith (PH–PPBM)	18,045	44.85%	200	Rafiei Mustapha (GS–PAS)	4,347	10.80%	40,237	Hassan Malek (BN–UMNO)
P130	Rasah	102,838	Cha Kee Chin (PH–DAP)	61,806	72.46%	46,867	Ng Kian Nam (BN–MCA)	14,939	17.51%	85,307	Teo Kok Seong (PH–DAP)
P130	Rasah	102,838	Cha Kee Chin (PH–DAP)	61,806	72.46%	46,867	Khairil Anuar Mohd Wafa (GS–PAS)	8,260	9.68%	85,307	Teo Kok Seong (PH–DAP)
P130	Rasah	102,838	Cha Kee Chin (PH–DAP)	61,806	72.46%	46,867	David Dass Aseerpatham (PAP)	302	0.35%	85,307	Teo Kok Seong (PH–DAP)
P131	Rembau	88,365	Khairy Jamaluddin Abu Bakar (BN–UMNO)	36,096	48.88%	4,364	Roseli Abdul Gani (PH–PKR)	31,732	42.96%	73,856	Khairy Jamaluddin Abu Bakar (BN–UMNO)
P131	Rembau	88,365	Khairy Jamaluddin Abu Bakar (BN–UMNO)	36,096	48.88%	4,364	Mustafa Dolah (GS–PAS)	6,028	8.16%	73,856	Khairy Jamaluddin Abu Bakar (BN–UMNO)
P132	Port Dickson	75,212	Danyal Balagopal Abdullah (PH–PKR)	36,225	59.06%	17,710	Mogan S. Velayatham (BN–MIC)	18,515	30.19%	61,334	Kamarul Bahrin Abbas (PH–PKR)
P132	Port Dickson	75,212	Danyal Balagopal Abdullah (PH–PKR)	36,225	59.06%	17,710	Mahfuz Roslan (GS–PAS)	6,594	10.75%	61,334	Kamarul Bahrin Abbas (PH–PKR)
P133	Tampin	60,765	Hasan Bahrom (PH–AMANAH)	22,435	46.29%	1,002	Shaziman Abu Mansor (BN–UMNO)	21,433	44.22%	48,466	Shaziman Abu Mansor (BN–UMNO)
P133	Tampin	60,765	Hasan Bahrom (PH–AMANAH)	22,435	46.29%	1,002	Abdul Halim Abu Bakar (GS–PAS)	4,598	9.49%	48,466	Shaziman Abu Mansor (BN–UMNO)

== Malacca ==
#	Constituency	Registered Electors	Winner	Votes	Votes %	Majority	Opponent(s)	Votes	Votes %	Total valid votes	Incumbent
PH 4 | BN 2 | GS 0 | Independent 0
P134	Masjid Tanah	51,441	Mas Ermieyati Samsudin (BN–UMNO)	22,898	54.10%	8,159	Sabirin Ja’afar (PH–PPBM)	14,739	34.82%	42,325	Mas Ermieyati Samsudin (BN–UMNO)
P134	Masjid Tanah	51,441	Mas Ermieyati Samsudin (BN–UMNO)	22,898	54.10%	8,159	Mohd Nasir Othman (GS–PAS)	4,688	11.08%	42,325	Mas Ermieyati Samsudin (BN–UMNO)
P135	Alor Gajah	70,364	Mohd Redzuan Md Yusof (PH–PPBM)	29,330	50.73%	6,980	Wong Nai Chee (BN–MCA)	22,350	38.66%	57,815	Koh Nai Kwong (BN–MCA)
P135	Alor Gajah	70,364	Mohd Redzuan Md Yusof (PH–PPBM)	29,330	50.73%	6,980	Mohd Nazree Mohd Aris (GS–PAS)	6,135	10.61%	57,815	Koh Nai Kwong (BN–MCA)
P136	Tangga Batu	83,213	Rusnah Aluai (PH–PKR)	32,420	46.89%	4,659	Zali Mat Yassin (BN–UMNO)	27,761	40.15%	69,142	Abu Bakar Mohamed Diah (BN–UMNO)
P136	Tangga Batu	83,213	Rusnah Aluai (PH–PKR)	32,420	46.89%	4,659	Zulkifli Ismail (GS–PAS)	8,961	12.96%	69,142	Abu Bakar Mohamed Diah (BN–UMNO)
P137	Hang Tuah Jaya	89,364	Shamsul Iskandar @ Yusre Mohd Akin (PH–PKR)	39,067	51.01%	8,640	Mohd Ali Rustam (BN–UMNO)	30,427	39.73%	76,583	Shamsul Iskandar @ Yusre Mohd Akin (PH–PKR)
P137	Hang Tuah Jaya	89,364	Shamsul Iskandar @ Yusre Mohd Akin (PH–PKR)	39,067	51.01%	8,640	Md Khalid Kassim (GS–PAS)	7,089	9.26%	76,583	Shamsul Iskandar @ Yusre Mohd Akin (PH–PKR)
P138	Kota Melaka	126,848	Khoo Poay Tiong (PH–DAP)	76,518	72.69%	49,175	Choo Wei Sern (BN–MCA)	27,343	25.97%	105,276	Sim Tong Him (IND)
P138	Kota Melaka	126,848	Khoo Poay Tiong (PH–DAP)	76,518	72.69%	49,175	Goh Leong San (IND)	1,415	1.34%	105,276	Sim Tong Him (IND)
P139	Jasin	73,432	Ahmad Hamzah (BN–UMNO)	26,560	43.00%	219	Khairuddin Abu Hassan (PH–AMANAH)	26,341	42.65%	61,761	Ahmad Hamzah (BN–UMNO)
P139	Jasin	73,432	Ahmad Hamzah (BN–UMNO)	26,560	43.00%	219	Abd Alim Shapie (GS–PAS)	8,860	14.35%	61,761	Ahmad Hamzah (BN–UMNO)

== Johor ==
#	Constituency s	Winner	Votes	Majority	Opponent(s)	Votes	Incumbent	Incumbent Majority
BN 8 | GS 0 | PH 18 | Independent 0
P140	Segamat	Edmund Santhara Kumar Ramanaidu (PH-PKR)	24,060	5,476	Subramaniam K. Sathasivam (BN-MIC)	18,584	Subramaniam K. Sathasivam (BN-MIC)	1,217
P140	Segamat	Edmund Santhara Kumar Ramanaidu (PH-PKR)	24,060	5,476	Khairul Faizi Ahmad Kamil (GS-PAS)	2,676	Subramaniam K. Sathasivam (BN-MIC)	1,217
P141	Sekijang	Natrah Ismail (PH-PKR)	19,559	1,281	Ayub Rahmat (BN-UMNO)	18,278	Anuar Abd Manap (BN-UMNO)	3,007
P142	Labis	Pang Hok Liong (PH-DAP)	16,709	3,408	Chua Tee Yong (BN-MCA)	13,301	Chua Tee Yong (BN-MCA)	353
P142	Labis	Pang Hok Liong (PH-DAP)	16,709	3,408	Sarchu Sawal (GS-PAS)	2,020	Chua Tee Yong (BN-MCA)	353
P143	Pagoh	Muhyiddin Mohd Yassin (PH-PPBM)	23,558	6,927	Ismail Mohamed (BN-UMNO)	16,631	Muhyiddin Mohd Yassin (PH-PPBM)	12,842
P143	Pagoh	Muhyiddin Mohd Yassin (PH-PPBM)	23,558	6,927	Ahmad Nawfal Mahfodz (GS-PAS)	2,483	Muhyiddin Mohd Yassin (PH-PPBM)	12,842
P144	Ledang	Syed Ibrahim Syed Noh (PH-PKR)	34,706	8,666	Hamim Samuri (BN-UMNO)	26,040	Hamim Samuri (BN-UMNO)	1,967
P144	Ledang	Syed Ibrahim Syed Noh (PH-PKR)	34,706	8,666	Rusman Kemin (GS-PAS)	4,668	Hamim Samuri (BN-UMNO)	1,967
P145	Bakri	Yeo Bee Yin (PH-DAP)	38,718	23,211	Koh Chon Chai (BN-MCA)	15,507	Er Teck Hwa (PH-DAP)	5,067
P145	Bakri	Yeo Bee Yin (PH-DAP)	38,718	23,211	Zarul @ Mohammad Zahrul Salleh (GS-PAS)	7,575	Er Teck Hwa (PH-DAP)	5,067
P146	Muar	Syed Saddiq Syed Abdul Rahman (PH-PPBM)	22,341	6,953	Razali Ibrahim (BN-UMNO)	15,388	Razali Ibrahim (BN-UMNO)	1,646
P146	Muar	Syed Saddiq Syed Abdul Rahman (PH-PPBM)	22,341	6,953	Abdul Aziz Talib (GS-PAS)	4,354	Razali Ibrahim (BN-UMNO)	1,646
P147	Parit Sulong	Noraini Ahmad (BN-UMNO)	24,481	6,341	Anis Afida Mohd Azli (PH-PAN)	18,140	Noraini Ahmad (BN-UMNO)	11,753
P147	Parit Sulong	Noraini Ahmad (BN-UMNO)	24,481	6,341	Ahmad Rosdi Bahari (GS-PAS)	7,148	Noraini Ahmad (BN-UMNO)	11,753
P148	Ayer Hitam	Wee Ka Siong (BN-MCA)	17,076	303	Liew Chin Tong (PH-DAP)	16,773	Wee Ka Siong (BN-MCA)	7,310
P148	Ayer Hitam	Wee Ka Siong (BN-MCA)	17,076	303	Mardi Marwan (GS-PAS)	4,975	Wee Ka Siong (BN-MCA)	7,310
P149	Sri Gading	Shahruddin Md Salleh (PH-PPBM)	21,511	3,288	Ab Aziz Kaprawi (BN-UMNO)	18,223	Ab Aziz Kaprawi (BN-UMNO)	5,761
P149	Sri Gading	Shahruddin Md Salleh (PH-PPBM)	21,511	3,288	M. Ash’ari Sudin (GS-PAS)	4,548	Ab Aziz Kaprawi (BN-UMNO)	5,761
P150	Batu Pahat	Mohd Rashid Hasnon (PH-PKR)	45,929	17,894	Haliza Abdullah (BN-UMNO)	28,035	Mohd Idris Jusi (PH-PKR)	1,524
P150	Batu Pahat	Mohd Rashid Hasnon (PH-PKR)	45,929	17,894	Mahfodz Mohamed (GS-PAS)	8,173	Mohd Idris Jusi (PH-PKR)	1,524
P151	Simpang Renggam	Maszlee Malik (PH-PPBM)	18,157	3,475	Liang Teck Meng (BN-GERAKAN)	14,682	Liang Teck Meng (BN-GERAKAN)	5,706
P151	Simpang Renggam	Maszlee Malik (PH-PPBM)	18,157	3,475	Mohd Jubri Selamat (GS-PAS)	2,983	Liang Teck Meng (BN-GERAKAN)	5,706
P152	Kluang	Wong Shu Qi (PH-DAP)	47,671	23,053	Gan Ping Sieu (BN-MCA)	24,618	Liew Chin Tong (PH-DAP)	7,359
P152	Kluang	Wong Shu Qi (PH-DAP)	47,671	23,053	Muhammad Hasbullah Md Najib (GS-PAS)	8,242	Liew Chin Tong (PH-DAP)	7,359
P153	Sembrong	Hishamuddin Hussein (BN-UMNO)	21,353	6,662	Onn Abu Bakar (PH-PKR)	14,691	Hishamuddin Hussein (BN-UMNO)	10,631
P154	Mersing	Abd Latiff Ahmad (BN-UMNO)	19,806	8,459	Nasir Hashim (PH-PPBM)	11,347	Abd Latiff Ahmad (BN-UMNO)	15,747
P154	Mersing	Abd Latiff Ahmad (BN-UMNO)	19,806	8,459	A. Rahman A. Hamid (GS-PAS)	6,215	Abd Latiff Ahmad (BN-UMNO)	15,747
P155	Tenggara	Adham Baba (BN-UMNO)	20,142	5,933	Norjepri Mohamed Jelani (PH-PPBM)	14,209	Halimah Mohamed Sadique (BN-UMNO)	17,196
P155	Tenggara	Adham Baba (BN-UMNO)	20,142	5,933	Yuhanita Yunan (GS-PAS)	2,683	Halimah Mohamed Sadique (BN-UMNO)	17,196
P156	Kota Tinggi	Halimah Mohamed Sadique (BN-UMNO)	26,407	14,621	Azlinda Abd Latif (PH-PPBM)	11,786	Noor Ehsanuddin Mohd Harun Narrashid (BN-UMNO)	24,574
P157	Pengerang	Azalina Othman Said (BN-UMNO)	21,829	11,417	Norliza Ngadiman (PH-PPBM)	10,412	Azalina Othman Said (BN-UMNO)	22,508
P158	Tebrau	Steven Choong Shiau Yoon (PH-PKR)	64,535	37,225	Hou Kok Chung (BN-MCA)	27,310	Khoo Soo Seang (BN-MCA)	1,767
P158	Tebrau	Steven Choong Shiau Yoon (PH-PKR)	64,535	37,225	Abdullah Husin (GS-PAS)	12,098	Khoo Soo Seang (BN-MCA)	1,767
P159	Pasir Gudang	Hassan Abdul Karim (PH-PKR)	61,615	24,726	Mohamed Khaled Nordin (BN-UMNO)	36,889	Normala Abdul Samad (BN-UMNO)	935
P159	Pasir Gudang	Hassan Abdul Karim (PH-PKR)	61,615	24,726	Ab Aziz Abdullah (GS-PAS)	6,278	Normala Abdul Samad (BN-UMNO)	935
P159	Pasir Gudang	Hassan Abdul Karim (PH-PKR)	61,615	24,726	Chee Jock (IND)	227	Normala Abdul Samad (BN-UMNO)	935
P160	Johor Bahru	Akmal Nasrullah Mohd Nasir (PH-PKR)	50,052	19,782	Shahrir Abd Samad (BN-UMNO)	30,270	Shahrir Abd Samad (BN-UMNO)	10,495
P161	Pulai	Salahuddin Ayub (PH-PAN)	55,447	28,924	Nur Jazlan Mohamed (BN-UMNO)	26,523	Nur Jazlan Mohamed (BN-UMNO)	3,226
P161	Pulai	Salahuddin Ayub (PH-PAN)	55,447	28,924	Mohd Mazri Yahya (GS-PAS)	4,332	Nur Jazlan Mohamed (BN-UMNO)	3,226
P161	Pulai	Salahuddin Ayub (PH-PAN)	55,447	28,924	Yap Keng Tak (IND)	591	Nur Jazlan Mohamed (BN-UMNO)	3,226
P162	Iskandar Puteri (previously known as Gelang Patah)	Lim Kit Siang (PH-DAP)	80,726	44,864	Jason Teoh Sew Hock (BN-MCA)	35,862	Lim Kit Siang (PH-DAP)	14,762
P163	Kulai	Teo Nie Ching (PH-DAP)	55,312	32,748	Tang Nai Soon (BN-MCA)	22,564	Teo Nie Ching (PH-DAP)	13,450
P163	Kulai	Teo Nie Ching (PH-DAP)	55,312	32,748	Juwahir Amin (GS-PAS)	6,667	Teo Nie Ching (PH-DAP)	13,450
P164	Pontian	Ahmad Maslan (BN-UMNO)	21,132	833	Karmaine Sardini (PH-PPBM)	20,299	Ahmad Maslan (BN-UMNO)	13,727
P164	Pontian	Ahmad Maslan (BN-UMNO)	21,132	833	Baharom Mohamad (GS-PAS)	4,295	Ahmad Maslan (BN-UMNO)	13,727
P165	Tanjung Piai (previously known as Tanjong Piai)	Md Farid Md Rafik (PH-PPBM)	21,255	524	Wee Jeck Seng (BN-MCA)	20,731	Wee Jeck Seng (BN-MCA)	5,457
P165	Tanjung Piai (previously known as Tanjong Piai)	Md Farid Md Rafik (PH-PPBM)	21,255	524	Nordin Othman (GS-PAS)	2,962	Wee Jeck Seng (BN-MCA)	5,457

== Federal Territory of Labuan ==
#	Constituency	Registered Electors	Winner	Votes	Votes %	Majority	Opponent(s)	Votes	Votes %	Total valid votes	Incumbent
BN 1 | GS 0 | PH 0 | WARISAN 0 | STAR 0 | Independent 0
P166	Labuan	28,356	Rozman Isli (BN–UMNO)	10,164	47.59%	1,450	Noor Halim Zaini (WARISAN)	8,714	40.80%	21,358	Rozman Isli (BN–UMNO)
P166	Labuan	28,356	Rozman Isli (BN–UMNO)	10,164	47.59%	1,450	Ahmad Junid Mohd Aling (GS–PAS)	1,555	7.28%	21,358	Rozman Isli (BN–UMNO)
P166	Labuan	28,356	Rozman Isli (BN–UMNO)	10,164	47.59%	1,450	Siti Zaleha S. W. Ibrahim (USA–PHRS)	925	4.33%	21,358	Rozman Isli (BN–UMNO)

== Sabah ==
#	Constituency s	Winner	Votes	Majority	Opponent(s)	Votes	Incumbent	Incumbent Majority
BN 10 | GS 0 | PH 6 | WARISAN 8 | STAR 1 | Independent 0
P167	Kudat	Abd Rahim Bakri (BN-UMNO)	18,503	1,359	Sharif Azman Sharif Along (WARISAN)	17,144	Abd Rahim Bakri (BN-UMNO)	12,376
P167	Kudat	Abd Rahim Bakri (BN-UMNO)	18,503	1,359	Mohd Ashraf Chin Abdullah (USA-PPRS)	1,432	Abd Rahim Bakri (BN-UMNO)	12,376
P168	Kota Marudu	Maximus J. Ongkili (BN-PBS)	13,033	1,774	Maijol Mahap (USA-PHRS)	11,259	Maximus J. Ongkili (BN-PBS)	842
P168	Kota Marudu	Maximus J. Ongkili (BN-PBS)	13,033	1,774	Barlus Mangabis (WARISAN)	7,113	Maximus J. Ongkili (BN-PBS)	842
P168	Kota Marudu	Maximus J. Ongkili (BN-PBS)	13,033	1,774	Paul Porodong (PCS)	2,501	Maximus J. Ongkili (BN-PBS)	842
P169	Kota Belud	Isnaraissah Munirah Majilis @ Fakharuddy (WARISAN)	23,429	4,262	Salleh Said Keruak (BN-UMNO)	19,167	Abd Rahman Dahlan (BN-UMNO)	5,095
P169	Kota Belud	Isnaraissah Munirah Majilis @ Fakharuddy (WARISAN)	23,429	4,262	Miasin Mion (USA-PHRS)	2,092	Abd Rahman Dahlan (BN-UMNO)	5,095
P169	Kota Belud	Isnaraissah Munirah Majilis @ Fakharuddy (WARISAN)	23,429	4,262	Ag. Laiman Ikin (GS-PAS)	1,410	Abd Rahman Dahlan (BN-UMNO)	5,095
P170	Tuaran	Wilfred Madius Tangau (BN-UPKO)	22,494	7,624	Chrisnadia Sinam (PH-PKR)	14,870	Wilfred Madius Tangau (BN-UPKO)	5,190
P170	Tuaran	Wilfred Madius Tangau (BN-UPKO)	22,494	7,624	Kalakau Untol (PCS)	2,611	Wilfred Madius Tangau (BN-UPKO)	5,190
P170	Tuaran	Wilfred Madius Tangau (BN-UPKO)	22,494	7,624	Syra Peter Gom (USA-PHRS)	2,311	Wilfred Madius Tangau (BN-UPKO)	5,190
P170	Tuaran	Wilfred Madius Tangau (BN-UPKO)	22,494	7,624	Mohd Aminuddin Aling (GS-PAS)	1,357	Wilfred Madius Tangau (BN-UPKO)	5,190
P171	Sepanggar	Mohd Azis Jamman (WARISAN)	28,420	12,984	Abd Rahman Dahlan (BN-UMNO)	15,436	Jumat Idris (BN-UMNO)	9,442
P171	Sepanggar	Mohd Azis Jamman (WARISAN)	28,420	12,984	Jeffrey Kumin (USA-SAPP)	2,958	Jumat Idris (BN-UMNO)	9,442
P171	Sepanggar	Mohd Azis Jamman (WARISAN)	28,420	12,984	Robert Sopining (PCS)	971	Jumat Idris (BN-UMNO)	9,442
P172	Kota Kinabalu	Chan Foong Hin (PH-DAP)	31,632	24,086	Joseph Lee Han Kyun (BN-PBS)	7,546	Jimmy Wong Sze Phin (PH-DAP)	18,959
P172	Kota Kinabalu	Chan Foong Hin (PH-DAP)	31,632	24,086	Yong Teck Lee (USA-SAPP)	3,132	Jimmy Wong Sze Phin (PH-DAP)	18,959
P173	Putatan	Awang Husaini Sahari (PH-PKR)	14,106	2,339	Makin @ Marcus Mojigoh (BN-UPKO)	11,767	Makin @ Marcus Mojigoh (BN-UPKO)	9,507
P173	Putatan	Awang Husaini Sahari (PH-PKR)	14,106	2,339	Zulzaim Hilmee Abidin (GS-PAS)	2,434	Makin @ Marcus Mojigoh (BN-UPKO)	9,507
P173	Putatan	Awang Husaini Sahari (PH-PKR)	14,106	2,339	Edmund Jivol Doudilim (USA-PHRS)	1,755	Makin @ Marcus Mojigoh (BN-UPKO)	9,507
P173	Putatan	Awang Husaini Sahari (PH-PKR)	14,106	2,339	Mil Kusin Abdillah Sulai (ANAK NEGERI)	728	Makin @ Marcus Mojigoh (BN-UPKO)	9,507
P174	Penampang	Darell Leiking (WARISAN)	32,470	23,473	Ceasar Mandela Malakun (BN-UPKO)	8,997	Darell Leiking (WARISAN)	10,216
P174	Penampang	Darell Leiking (WARISAN)	32,470	23,473	Cleftus Stephen Spine (USA-STAR)	1,196	Darell Leiking (WARISAN)	10,216
P174	Penampang	Darell Leiking (WARISAN)	32,470	23,473	Edwin Bosi (ANAK NEGERI)	445	Darell Leiking (WARISAN)	10,216
P175	Papar	Ahmad Hassan (WARISAN)	17,394	325	Rosnah Abdul Rashid Shirlin (BN-UMNO)	17,069	Rosnah Abdul Rashid Shirlin (BN-UMNO)	10,535
P175	Papar	Ahmad Hassan (WARISAN)	17,394	325	Jamil William Core (USA-STAR)	892	Rosnah Abdul Rashid Shirlin (BN-UMNO)	10,535
P175	Papar	Ahmad Hassan (WARISAN)	17,394	325	Elbert Sikuil (PCS)	481	Rosnah Abdul Rashid Shirlin (BN-UMNO)	10,535
P176	Kimanis	Anifah Aman (BN-UMNO)	11,942	156	Karim Bujang (WARISAN)	11,786	Anifah Aman (BN-UMNO)	5,723
P176	Kimanis	Anifah Aman (BN-UMNO)	11,942	156	Jaafar Ismail (USA-PHRS)	1,300	Anifah Aman (BN-UMNO)	5,723
P177	Beaufort	Azizah Mohd Dun (BN-UMNO)	11,354	3,331	Lajim Ukin (USA-PHRS)	8,023	Azizah Mohd Dun (BN-UMNO)	673
P177	Beaufort	Azizah Mohd Dun (BN-UMNO)	11,354	3,331	Johan @ Christopher O. T. Ghani (PH-PKR)	7,835	Azizah Mohd Dun (BN-UMNO)	673
P178	Sipitang	Yamani Hafez Musa (BN-UMNO)	12,038	852	Noor Hayaty Mustapha (WARISAN)	11,186	Sapawi Amat Wasali @ Ahmad (BN-UMNO)	9,469
P178	Sipitang	Yamani Hafez Musa (BN-UMNO)	12,038	852	Dayang Aezzy Liman (USA-PHRS)	1,547	Sapawi Amat Wasali @ Ahmad (BN-UMNO)	9,469
P179	Ranau	Jonathan Yasin (PH-PKR)	14,880	1,076	Ewon Ebin (BN-UPKO)	13,804	Ewon Ebin (BN-UPKO)	3,611
P179	Ranau	Jonathan Yasin (PH-PKR)	14,880	1,076	Soudi Andang (USA-STAR)	3,148	Ewon Ebin (BN-UPKO)	3,611
P179	Ranau	Jonathan Yasin (PH-PKR)	14,880	1,076	Andau Yasun (PCS)	1,110	Ewon Ebin (BN-UPKO)	3,611
P180	Keningau	Jeffrey G. Kitingan (USA-STAR)	13,286	45	Jake Nointin (WARISAN)	13,241	Joseph Pairin Kitingan (BN-PBS)	3,918
P180	Keningau	Jeffrey G. Kitingan (USA-STAR)	13,286	45	Daniel Kinsik (BN-PBS)	12,742	Joseph Pairin Kitingan (BN-PBS)	3,918
P180	Keningau	Jeffrey G. Kitingan (USA-STAR)	13,286	45	Jius Awang (PCS)	433	Joseph Pairin Kitingan (BN-PBS)	3,918
P180	Keningau	Jeffrey G. Kitingan (USA-STAR)	13,286	45	Maimin Rijan (IND)	248	Joseph Pairin Kitingan (BN-PBS)	3,918
P180	Keningau	Jeffrey G. Kitingan (USA-STAR)	13,286	45	Justin Guka (IND)	199	Joseph Pairin Kitingan (BN-PBS)	3,918
P181	Tenom	Noorita Sual (PH-DAP)	11,363	1,133	Rubin Balang (BN-UMNO)	10,230	Raime Unggi (BN-UMNO)	3,886
P181	Tenom	Noorita Sual (PH-DAP)	11,363	1,133	Yuslinah Laikim (USA-PHRS)	645	Raime Unggi (BN-UMNO)	3,886
P182	Pensiangan	Arthur Joseph Kurup (BN-PBRS)	11,783	2,314	Raymond Ahuar (PH-PKR)	9,469	Joseph Kurup (BN-PBRS)	1,744
P182	Pensiangan	Arthur Joseph Kurup (BN-PBRS)	11,783	2,314	Richard Joe Jimmy (USA-STAR)	2,839	Joseph Kurup (BN-PBRS)	1,744
P182	Pensiangan	Arthur Joseph Kurup (BN-PBRS)	11,783	2,314	Maidin Osman (PCS)	212	Joseph Kurup (BN-PBRS)	1,744
P182	Pensiangan	Arthur Joseph Kurup (BN-PBRS)	11,783	2,314	Engah Sintan (IND)	65	Joseph Kurup (BN-PBRS)	1,744
P183	Beluran	Ronald Kiandee (BN-UMNO)	13,007	7,115	Japar Zairun (WARISAN)	5,892	Ronald Kiandee (BN-UMNO)	9,988
P183	Beluran	Ronald Kiandee (BN-UMNO)	13,007	7,115	Sipin Kadandi (USA-PHRS)	996	Ronald Kiandee (BN-UMNO)	9,988
P183	Beluran	Ronald Kiandee (BN-UMNO)	13,007	7,115	Toidy Luit (PCS)	284	Ronald Kiandee (BN-UMNO)	9,988
P183	Beluran	Ronald Kiandee (BN-UMNO)	13,007	7,115	Lem Matin (USA-PPRS)	273	Ronald Kiandee (BN-UMNO)	9,988
P183	Beluran	Ronald Kiandee (BN-UMNO)	13,007	7,115	Salimah Oyong (IND)	246	Ronald Kiandee (BN-UMNO)	9,988
P184	Libaran	Zakaria Mohd Edris @ Tubau (BN-UMNO)	17,799	678	Irwanshah Mustapa (WARISAN)	17,121	Juslie Ajirol (BN-UMNO)	11,586
P184	Libaran	Zakaria Mohd Edris @ Tubau (BN-UMNO)	17,799	678	Alfian Mansyur (USA-PHRS)	1,223	Juslie Ajirol (BN-UMNO)	11,586
P185	Batu Sapi	Liew Vui Keong (WARISAN)	12,976	4,619	Linda Tsen Thau Lin (BN-PBS)	8,357	Linda Tsen Thau Lin (BN-PBS)	3,798
P185	Batu Sapi	Liew Vui Keong (WARISAN)	12,976	4,619	Hamzah @ Hamza A. Abdullah (PH-PAN)	980	Linda Tsen Thau Lin (BN-PBS)	3,798
P185	Batu Sapi	Liew Vui Keong (WARISAN)	12,976	4,619	Norsah Bongsu (GS-PAS)	948	Linda Tsen Thau Lin (BN-PBS)	3,798
P186	Sandakan	Stephen Wong Tien Fatt (PH-DAP)	19,094	10,098	Lim Ming Hoo (BN-LDP)	8,996	Stephen Wong Tien Fatt (PH-DAP)	1,088
P187	Kinabatangan	Bung Moktar Radin (BN-UMNO)	14,465	9,478	Ghazali Abdul Ghani (WARISAN)	4,987	Bung Moktar Radin (BN-UMNO)	9,731
P187	Kinabatangan	Bung Moktar Radin (BN-UMNO)	14,465	9,478	Mustapa Datu Tambuyong (USA-PHRS)	2,066	Bung Moktar Radin (BN-UMNO)	9,731
P188	Silam	Mohamaddin Ketapi (WARISAN)	23,352	6,401	Datu Nasrun Datu Mansor (BN-UMNO)	16,951	Datu Nasrun Datu Mansor (BN-UMNO)	13,387
P188	Silam	Mohamaddin Ketapi (WARISAN)	23,352	6,401	Ramli Pataruddin (GS-PAS)	1,431	Datu Nasrun Datu Mansor (BN-UMNO)	13,387
P188	Silam	Mohamaddin Ketapi (WARISAN)	23,352	6,401	Siti Shazianti Ajak (USA-PHRS)	1,306	Datu Nasrun Datu Mansor (BN-UMNO)	13,387
P189	Semporna	Mohd Shafie Apdal (WARISAN)	26,809	20,674	Ramlee Marhaban (BN-UMNO)	6,135	Mohd Shafie Apdal (WARISAN)	20,905
P189	Semporna	Mohd Shafie Apdal (WARISAN)	26,809	20,674	Abdul Nasir Ab Raup (GS-PAS)	384	Mohd Shafie Apdal (WARISAN)	20,905
P189	Semporna	Mohd Shafie Apdal (WARISAN)	26,809	20,674	Asmara Asmad (USA-PHRS)	98	Mohd Shafie Apdal (WARISAN)	20,905
P190	Tawau	Christina Liew Chin Jin (PH-PKR)	21,400	4,727	Mary Yap Kain Ching (BN-PBS)	16,673	Mary Yap Kain Ching (BN-PBS)	4,979
P190	Tawau	Christina Liew Chin Jin (PH-PKR)	21,400	4,727	Mohamad Husain (GS-PAS)	2,518	Mary Yap Kain Ching (BN-PBS)	4,979
P190	Tawau	Christina Liew Chin Jin (PH-PKR)	21,400	4,727	Alizaman Jijurahman (USA-PHRS)	2,162	Mary Yap Kain Ching (BN-PBS)	4,979
P191	Kalabakan	Ma'mun Sulaiman (WARISAN)	18,486	3,187	Abdul Ghapur Salleh (BN-UMNO)	15,299	Abdul Ghapur Salleh (BN-UMNO)	14,221
P191	Kalabakan	Ma'mun Sulaiman (WARISAN)	18,486	3,187	Norbin Aloh (GS-PAS)	2,813	Abdul Ghapur Salleh (BN-UMNO)	14,221
P191	Kalabakan	Ma'mun Sulaiman (WARISAN)	18,486	3,187	Ahmad Lahama (USA-PPRS)	311	Abdul Ghapur Salleh (BN-UMNO)	14,221

== Sarawak ==
#	Constituency s	Winner	Votes	Majority	Opponent(s)	Votes	Incumbent	Incumbent Majority
BN 19 | GS 0 | PH 10 | Independent 2
P192	Mas Gading	Mordi Bimol (PH-DAP)	12,771	3,024	Anthony Nogeh Gumbek (BN-PDP)	9,747	Anthony Nogeh Gumbek (BN-PDP)	2,156
P193	Santubong	Wan Junaidi Tuanku Jaafar (BN-PBB)	26,379	19,485	Mohamad Fidzuan Zaidi (PH-PAN)	6,894	Wan Junaidi Tuanku Jaafar (BN-PBB)	20,936
P194	Petra Jaya	Fadillah Yusof (BN-PBB)	28,306	15,017	Nor Irwan Ahmat Nor (PH-PKR)	13,289	Fadillah Yusof (BN-PBB)	21,443
P194	Petra Jaya	Fadillah Yusof (BN-PBB)	28,306	15,017	Hamdan Sani (GS-PAS)	1,350	Fadillah Yusof (BN-PBB)	21,443
P195	Bandar Kuching	Kelvin Yii Lee Wuen (PH-DAP)	48,548	35,973	Kho Teck Wan (BN-SUPP)	12,575	Chong Chieng Jen (PH-DAP)	19,642
P196	Stampin	Chong Chieng Jen (PH-DAP)	33,060	14,221	Sim Kui Hian (BN-SUPP)	18,839	Julian Tan Kok Ping (PH-DAP)	18,670
P197	Kota Samarahan	Rubiah Wang (BN-PBB)	25,070	16,992	Sopian Julaihi (PH-PAN)	8,078	Rubiah Wang (BN-PBB)	17,401
P197	Kota Samarahan	Rubiah Wang (BN-PBB)	25,070	16,992	Zulkipli Ramzi (GS-PAS)	2,719	Rubiah Wang (BN-PBB)	17,401
P198	Puncak Borneo (previously known as Mambong)	Willie Mongin (PH-PKR)	18,865	4,005	Genot Sibek @ Jeannoth Sinel (BN-PBB)	14,860	James Dawos Mamit (BN-PBB)	9,721
P198	Puncak Borneo (previously known as Mambong)	Willie Mongin (PH-PKR)	18,865	4,005	Buln Ribos (STAR)	795	James Dawos Mamit (BN-PBB)	9,721
P199	Serian	Richard Riot Jaem (BN-SUPP)	17,545	9,905	Edward Andrew Luwak (PH-DAP)	7,640	Richard Riot Jaem (BN-SUPP)	13,151
P199	Serian	Richard Riot Jaem (BN-SUPP)	17,545	9,905	Senior William Rade (IND)	2,234	Richard Riot Jaem (BN-SUPP)	13,151
P200	Batang Sadong	Nancy Shukri (BN-PBB)	14,208	12,328	Othman Mustapha (PH-PAN)	1,880	Nancy Shukri (BN-PBB)	11,260
P200	Batang Sadong	Nancy Shukri (BN-PBB)	14,208	12,328	Asan Singkro (GS-PAS)	978	Nancy Shukri (BN-PBB)	11,260
P201	Batang Lupar	Rohani Abdul Karim (BN-PBB)	14,204	10,277	Wan Abdillah Wan Ahmad (GS-PAS)	3,927	Rohani Abdul Karim (BN-PBB)	10,964
P201	Batang Lupar	Rohani Abdul Karim (BN-PBB)	14,204	10,277	Narudin Mentali (PH-PAN)	2,020	Rohani Abdul Karim (BN-PBB)	10,964
P202	Sri Aman	Masir Kujat (BN-PRS)	14,141	5,820	Norina Umoi Utot (PH-PKR)	8,321	Masir Kujat (BN-PRS)	6,550
P202	Sri Aman	Masir Kujat (BN-PRS)	14,141	5,820	Cobbold John Lusoi (PBDS BARU)	538	Masir Kujat (BN-PRS)	6,550
P203	Lubok Antu	Jugah Muyang (IND)	5,834	1,059	Robert Pasang Alam (BN-PRS)	4,775	William Nyallau Badak (BN-PRS)	4,091
P203	Lubok Antu	Jugah Muyang (IND)	5,834	1,059	Nicholas Bawin Anggat (PH-PKR)	3,942	William Nyallau Badak (BN-PRS)	4,091
P204	Betong	Robert Lawson Chuat Vincent Entering (BN-PBB)	12,517	8,116	Abang Ahmad Abang Suni (IND)	4,401	Douglas Uggah Embas (BN-PBB)	10,887
P204	Betong	Robert Lawson Chuat Vincent Entering (BN-PBB)	12,517	8,116	Noel Changgai Bucking (PH-PKR)	3,802	Douglas Uggah Embas (BN-PBB)	10,887
P205	Saratok	Ali Biju (PH-PKR)	11,848	989	Subeng Mula (BN-PDP)	10,859	William Mawan Ikom (TERAS)	2,081
P206	Tanjong Manis	Yusuf Abd. Wahab (BN-PBB)	11,402	8,674	Mohamad Fadillah Sabali (PH-PAN)	2,728	Norah Abd Rahman (BN-PBB)	10,964
P207	Igan	Ahmad Johnie Zawawi (BN-PBB)	10,538	8,495	Andri Zulkarnaen Hamden (PH-PAN)	2,043	A. Wahab Dolah (BN-PBB)	10,149
P208	Sarikei	Wong Ling Biu (PH-DAP)	16,327	2,570	Huang Tiong Sii (BN-SUPP)	13,757	Wong Ling Biu (PH-DAP)	505
P208	Sarikei	Wong Ling Biu (PH-DAP)	16,327	2,570	Wong Chin King (PBK)	392	Wong Ling Biu (PH-DAP)	505
P209	Julau	Larry Soon @ Larry S'ng Wei Shien (IND)	10,105	1,937	Joseph Salang Gandum (BN-PRS)	8,174	Joseph Salang Gandum (BN-PRS)	5,955
P210	Kanowit	Aaron Ago Dagang (BN-PRS)	9,552	4,312	Satu Anchom (PH-PKR)	5,240	Aaron Ago Dagang (BN-PRS)	3,042
P211	Lanang	Alice Lau Kiong Yieng (PH-DAP)	29,905	14,546	Kong Sien Chiu (BN-SUPP)	15,359	Alice Lau Kiong Yieng (PH-DAP)	8,630
P211	Lanang	Alice Lau Kiong Yieng (PH-DAP)	29,905	14,546	Priscilla Lau (PEACE)	628	Alice Lau Kiong Yieng (PH-DAP)	8,630
P212	Sibu	Oscar Ling Chai Yew (PH-DAP)	33,811	11,442	Andrew Wong Kee Yew (BN-SUPP)	22,389	Oscar Ling Chai Yew (PH-DAP)	2,841
P212	Sibu	Oscar Ling Chai Yew (PH-DAP)	33,811	11,442	Tiew Yen Houng (PEACE)	377	Oscar Ling Chai Yew (PH-DAP)	2,841
P212	Sibu	Oscar Ling Chai Yew (PH-DAP)	33,811	11,442	Tiong Ing Tung (STAR)	176	Oscar Ling Chai Yew (PH-DAP)	2,841
P213	Mukah	Hanifah Hajar Taib (BN-PBB)	13,853	7,000	Abdul Jalil Bujang (PH-PKR)	6,853	Muhd Leo Michael Toyad Abdullah (BN-PBB)	12,764
P214	Selangau	Baru Bian (PH-PKR)	11,228	486	Rita Sarimah Patrick Insol (BN-PRS)	10,742	Joseph Entulu Belaun (IND)	7,555
P215	Kapit	Alexander Nanta Linggi (BN-PBB)	14,302	10,479	Paren Nyawi (PH-DAP)	3,823	Alexander Nanta Linggi (BN-PBB)	9,731
P216	Hulu Rajang	Wilson Ugak Kumbong (BN-PRS)	11,834	6,315	Abun Sui Anyit (PH-PKR)	5,519	Wilson Ugak Kumbong (BN-PRS)	5,834
P217	Bintulu	Tiong King Sing (BN-PDP)	27,076	7,022	Tony Chiew Chan Yew (PH-DAP)	20,054	Tiong King Sing (BN-PDP)	7,433
P217	Bintulu	Tiong King Sing (BN-PDP)	27,076	7,022	Chieng Lea Phing (STAR)	328	Tiong King Sing (BN-PDP)	7,433
P218	Sibuti	Lukanisman Awang Sauni (BN-PBB)	12,214	3,676	Jemat Panjang (PH-PKR)	8,538	Ahmad Lai Bujang (BN-PBB)	6,066
P218	Sibuti	Lukanisman Awang Sauni (BN-PBB)	12,214	3,676	Zulaihi Bakar (GS-PAS)	1,617	Ahmad Lai Bujang (BN-PBB)	6,066
P219	Miri	Michael Teo Yu Keng (PH-PKR)	35,739	13,663	Sebastian Ting Chiew Yew (BN-SUPP)	22,076	Micheal Teo Yu Keng (PH-PKR)	1,992
P220	Baram	Anyi Ngau (BN-PDP)	12,171	1,990	Roland Engan (PH-PKR)	10,181	Anyi Ngau (BN-PDP)	194
P221	Limbang	Hasbi Habibollah (BN-PBB)	12,589	7,710	Ricardo Yampil Baba (PH-PKR)	4,879	Hasbi Habibollah (BN-PBB)	8,301
P222	Lawas	Henry Sum Agong (BN-PBB)	10,037	6,000	Danny Piri (PH-PKR)	4,037	Henry Sum Agong (BN-PBB)	6,030
P222	Lawas	Henry Sum Agong (BN-PBB)	10,037	6,000	Mohamad Ibrahim (IND)	176	Henry Sum Agong (BN-PBB)	6,030
