= Che Uda Che Nik =

Malaysian politician

Che Uda Che Nik SDK BCK AMN
- چئ اودا چئ نئ

Member of the Malaysian Parliament for Sik, Kedah
- In office 8 March 2008 – 5 May 2013
- Preceded by: Wan Azmi Wan Ariffin (BN–UMNO)
- Succeeded by: Mansor Abd Rahman (BN–UMNO)
- Majority: 481 (2008)

Personal details
- Born: Che Uda bin Che Nik; 11 March 1949 (age 77) Kedah, Federation of Malaya (now Malaysia)
- Party: Malaysian Islamic Party (PAS); National Trust Party (AMANAH)
- Other political affiliations: Pakatan Rakyat (PR); Pakatan Harapan (PH)
- Children: Azli Che Uda
- Occupation: Politician

Che Uda bin Che Nik (born 11 March 1949) is a Malaysian politician. He was the Member of the Parliament of Malaysia for the Sik constituency in the state of Kedah from 2008 to 2013.

Che Uda was elected to the Sik seat in the 2008 general election with a slim margin majority, defeating incumbent Othman Desa of the ruling Barisan Nasional coalition. Prior to his election, Che Uda was Deputy Director of the Kedah Department of Education. He served for one term only in the Parliament, before losing his seat in the 2013 general election to the Barisan Nasional's Mansor Abd Rahman.

== Election results ==
Parliament of Malaysia
Year	Constituency	Candidate	Votes	Pct	Opponent(s)	Votes	Pct	Ballots cast	Majority	Turnout
2008	P013 Sik	Che Uda Che Nik (PAS)	16,864	49.81%	Othman Desa (UMNO)	16,383	48.39%	33,859	481	83.94%
2013	P013 Sik	Che Uda Che Nik (PAS)	19,277	45.81%	Mansor Abd Rahman (UMNO)	22,084	52.48%	42,077	2,807	89.94%

== Honours ==
- Malaysia
  - Member of the Order of the Defender of the Realm (AMN) (2004)
- Kedah
  - Companion of the Order of Loyalty to the Royal House of Kedah (SDK) (2009)
  - State of Kedah Distinguished Service Star (BCK) (2001)
