= Sik (federal constituency) =

Federal constituency of Kedah, Malaysia

Sik (P013)
Kedah constituency

Federal constituency
- Legislature: Dewan Rakyat
- MP: Ahmad Tarmizi Sulaiman; PN
- Constituency created: 1984
- First contested: 1986
- Last contested: 2022

Demographics
- Population (2020): 67,400
- Electors (2023): 63,262
- Area (km²): 1,645
- Pop. density (per km²): 41

Sik is a federal constituency in Sik District, Kedah, Malaysia, that has been represented in the Dewan Rakyat since 1986.

The federal constituency was created in the 1984 redistribution and is mandated to return a single member to the Dewan Rakyat under the first past the post voting system.

== Demographics ==
https://live.chinapress.com.my/ge15/parliament/KEDAH

Ethnic breakdown of Sik's electorate as of 2022
1. Malay (92.7%)
2. Other ethnicities (4.10%)
3. Chinese (1.80%)
4. Indian (1.40%)

As of 2020, Sik has a population of 67,640 people.

Age breakdown of Sik's electorate as of 2022
1. 18-20 (6.25%)
2. 21-29 (21.2%)
3. 30-39 (23.2%)
4. 40-49 (18.3%)
5. 50-59 (14.0%)
6. 60-69 (10.0%)
7. 70-79 (4.91%)
8. 80-89 (1.71%)
9. above 90 (0.30%)
Gender breakdown of Sik's electorate as of 2022
1. Male (49.4%)
2. Female (50.6%)

== History ==
=== Polling districts ===
According to the federal gazette issued on 18 July 2023, the Sik constituency is divided into 30 polling districts.

State constituency	Polling Districts	Code	Location
Belantek (N23)	Kota Aur	013/23/01	SK Kota Aur
Belantek (N23)	Belantek	013/23/02	SK Seri Ampang Muda
Belantek (N23)	Kampung Gulau	013/23/03	SMK Gulau
Belantek (N23)	Kubang Kesom	013/23/04	SK Danglau
Belantek (N23)	Chepir	013/23/05	SK Chepir
Belantek (N23)	Kampung Chong	013/23/06	SK Paya Terendam
Belantek (N23)	Bendang Man	013/23/07	SMK Chepir
Belantek (N23)	Durian Burong	013/23/08	SK Sik Dalam
Belantek (N23)	Charok Kit	013/23/09	Kolej KEDA
Belantek (N23)	Kampung Dusun	013/23/10	SMK Sik
Belantek (N23)	Pekan Sik	013/23/11	SK Sik
Belantek (N23)	Kampung Sadu	013/23/12	SJK (C) Chung Hwa
Belantek (N23)	Kampung Namek	013/23/13	SK Seri Dusun
Belantek (N23)	Kampung Kemelong	013/23/14	Maktab Mahmud Sik
Jeneri (N24)	Padang Chichak	013/24/01	SK Padang Chicak
Jeneri (N24)	Kampung Betong	013/24/02	SK Kampung Betong
Jeneri (N24)	Kota Bukit	013/24/03	SK Kg Kota Bukit
Jeneri (N24)	Kuala Jeneri	013/24/04	SK Jeneri
Jeneri (N24)	Kampung Kalai	013/24/05	SK Kalai
Jeneri (N24)	Kampung Kuala Bigia	013/24/06	Maahad Al-Tarbiah Al-Islamiah Al-Wataniah (Pondok Begia)
Jeneri (N24)	Kampung Chemara	013/24/07	SK Chemara
Jeneri (N24)	Kampung Bigia	013/24/08	Gelanggang Futsal Watt Siam Kampung Begia
Jeneri (N24)	Kampung Telui	013/24/09	SK Teloi Tua
Jeneri (N24)	Batu Lima	013/24/10	SK Batu Lima
Jeneri (N24)	Charok Padang	013/24/11	SMK Seri Enggang
Jeneri (N24)	Hujong Bandar	013/24/12	SK Hujung Bandar
Jeneri (N24)	Kampung Bandar	013/24/13	SK Teloi Tua
Jeneri (N24)	Tupai	013/24/14	SK Haji Hussain
Jeneri (N24)	FELDA Telui Timor	013/24/15	SK Teloi Timor
Jeneri (N24)	Beris Jaya	013/24/16	SK Bandar Baru Beris Jaya

=== Representation history ===
Members of Parliament for Sik
Parliament	No	Years	Member	Party	Vote Share
Constituency created from Baling, Sungai Petani, Ulu Muda and Kuala Muda
7th	P012	1986–1990	Zainol Abidin Johari (زاينول عابدين جوهري)	BN (UMNO)	18,741; 62.36%
8th	P012	1990–1995	Abdul Hamid Othman (عبدالحميد عثمان)	BN (UMNO)	21,048; 61.36
9th	P013	1995–1999	Abdul Hamid Othman (عبدالحميد عثمان)	BN (UMNO)	12,756; 54.56%
10th	P013	1999–2004	Shahnon Ahmad (شهنون احمد)	BA (PAS)	13,546; 50.63%
11th	P013	2004–2008	Wan Azmi Wan Ariffin (وان عزمي وان عريفين)	BN (UMNO)	15,357; 50.52%
12th	P013	2008–2013	Che Uda Che Nik (چي اودا چي نئ)	PR (PAS)	16,864; 50.72%
13th	P013	2013–2018	Mansor Abd Rahman (منصور عبدالرحمن)	BN (UMNO)	22,084; 53.39%
14th	P013	2018–2020	Ahmad Tarmizi Sulaiman (احمد ترمذي سليمان)	GS (PAS)	20,088; 47.91%
14th	P013	2020–2022	Ahmad Tarmizi Sulaiman (احمد ترمذي سليمان)	PN (PAS)	20,088; 47.91%
15th	P013	2022–present	Ahmad Tarmizi Sulaiman (احمد ترمذي سليمان)	PN (PAS)	34,606; 67.64%

=== State constituency ===
Parliamentary constituency	State constituency						
Parliamentary constituency	1955–1959*	1959–1974	1974–1986	1986–1995	1995–2004	2004–2018	2018–present
Sik					Belantek		
Sik				Bukit Selambau			
Sik				Jeneri			

=== Historical boundaries ===
State Constituency	Area			
State Constituency	1984	1994	2003	2018
Belantek		Belantek; Danglau; Gulau; Kampung Jering; Kampung Telaga Datu		
Bukit Selambau	Bandar Laguna Merbok; Bukit Selambau; Kuala Sin; Lagenda Heights; Sungai Lalang			
Jeneri	Belantek; Beris Jaya; Danglau; Gulau; FELDA Telui Timor	Beris Jaya; FELDA Telui Timor; Jeneri; Kampung Kalai; Kampung Sedu		

=== Current state assembly members ===
No.	State Constituency	Member	Coalition (Party)
N23	Belantek	Ahmad Sulaiman	PN (PAS)
N24	Jeneri	Muhammad Sanusi Md Nor	PN (PAS)

=== Local governments & postcodes ===
No.	State Constituency	Local Government	Postcode
N23	Belantek	Sik District Council	06710 Pendang; 08200, 08210, 08340 Sik; 08700 Jeniang
N24	Jeneri	Sik District Council	06710 Pendang; 08200, 08210, 08340 Sik; 08700 Jeniang

== Election results ==
Malaysian general election, 2022
Party	Candidate	Votes	%	∆%
PN	Ahmad Tarmizi Sulaiman	34,606	67.64	▲67.64
BN	Maizatul Akmam Othman @Ibrahim	12,189	25.06	▼10.41
PH	Latifah Mohammad Yatim	3,736	7.30	▲7.30
Total valid votes		51,161	100.00	
Total rejected ballots		416		
Unreturned ballots		82		
Turnout		51,659	81.05	▼3.84
Registered electors		63,126		
Majority		21,787	42.58	▲30.14
PN hold		Swing		
Source(s) https://lom.agc.gov.my/ilims/upload/portal/akta/outputp/1753260/PUB%20606%20(2022).pdf

Malaysian general election, 2018
Party	Candidate	Votes	%	∆%
PAS	Ahmad Tarmizi Sulaiman	20,088	47.91	▲1.30
BN	Mansor Abd Rahman	14,870	35.47	▼17.92
PKR	Azli Che Uda	6,970	16.62	▲16.62
Total valid votes		41,928	100.00	
Total rejected ballots		729		
Unreturned ballots		115		
Turnout		42,772	84.89	▼5.05
Registered electors		50,385		
Majority		5,218	12.44	▲5.66
PAS gain from BN		Swing		?
Source(s) "His Majesty's Government Gazette - Notice of Contested Election, Parliament for the State of Kedah [P.U. (B) 233/2018]" (PDF). Attorney General's Chambers of Malaysia. 3 May 2018. "Federal Government Gazette - Results of Contested Election and Statements of the Poll after the Official Addition of Votes, Parliamentary Constituencies for the State of Kedah [P.U. (B) 307/2018]" (PDF). Attorney General's Chambers of Malaysia. 28 May 2018.

Malaysian general election, 2013
Party	Candidate	Votes	%	∆%
BN	Mansor Abd Rahman	22,084	53.39	▲4.11
PAS	Che Uda Che Nik	19,277	46.61	▼4.11
Total valid votes		41,361	100.00	
Total rejected ballots		631		
Unreturned ballots		85		
Turnout		42,077	89.94	▲6.00
Registered electors		46,786		
Majority		2,807	6.78	▲5.34
BN gain from PAS		Swing		?
Source(s) "Federal Government Gazette - Notice of Contested Election, Parliament for the State of Kedah [P.U. (B) 170/2013]" (PDF). Attorney General's Chambers of Malaysia. 26 April 2013. "Federal Government Gazette - Results of Contested Election and Statements of the Poll after the Official Addition of Votes, Parliamentary Constituencies for the State of Kedah [P.U. (B) 211/2013]" (PDF). Attorney General's Chambers of Malaysia. 22 May 2013.

Malaysian general election, 2008
Party	Candidate	Votes	%	∆%
PAS	Che Uda Che Nik	16,864	50.72	▲1.24
BN	Othman Desa	16,383	49.28	▼1.24
Total valid votes		33,247	100.00	
Total rejected ballots		505		
Unreturned ballots		107		
Turnout		33,859	83.94	▼1.60
Registered electors		40,339		
Majority		481	1.44	▲0.40
PAS gain from BN		Swing		?

Malaysian general election, 2004
Party	Candidate	Votes	%	∆%
BN	Wan Azmi Wan Ariffin	15,357	50.52	▲1.15
PAS	Azizan Abdul Razak	15,038	49.48	▼1.15
Total valid votes		30,395	100.00	
Total rejected ballots		1,287		
Unreturned ballots		0		
Turnout		31,682	85.54	▲3.23
Registered electors		37,037		
Majority		319	1.04	▼0.22
BN gain from PAS		Swing		?

Malaysian general election, 1999
Party	Candidate	Votes	%	∆%
PAS	Shahnon Ahmad	13,546	50.63	▲5.19
BN	Abdul Hamid Othman	13,211	49.37	▼5.19
Total valid votes		26,757	100.00	
Total rejected ballots		452		
Unreturned ballots		14		
Turnout		27,223	82.31	▲3.77
Registered electors		33,073		
Majority		335	1.26	▼7.86
PAS gain from BN		Swing		?

Malaysian general election, 1995
Party	Candidate	Votes	%	∆%
BN	Abdul Hamid Othman	12,756	54.56	▼6.80
PAS	Ali Taib	10,622	45.44	▲45.44
Total valid votes		23,378	100.00	
Total rejected ballots		789		
Unreturned ballots		24		
Turnout		24,191	78.54	▲0.96
Registered electors		30,800		
Majority		2,134	9.12	▼15.16
BN hold		Swing		

Malaysian general election, 1990
Party	Candidate	Votes	%	∆%
BN	Abdul Hamid Othman	21,048	61.36	▼1.00
S46	Zainol Abidin Johari	12,719	37.08	▲37.08
Independent	Ab. Razak Ag. Long	537	1.57	▲1.57
Total valid votes		34,304	100.00	
Total rejected ballots		1,126		
Unreturned ballots		0		
Turnout		35,430	77.58	▲1.92
Registered electors		45,671		
Majority		8,329	24.28	▼0.44
BN hold		Swing		

Malaysian general election, 1986
Party	Candidate	Votes	%
BN	Zainol Abidin Johari	18,741	62.36
PAS	Ramli Hassan	11,310	37.64
Total valid votes		30,051	100.00
Total rejected ballots		823	
Unreturned ballots			
Turnout		30,874	75.66
Registered electors		40,806	
Majority		7,431	24.72
This was a new constituency created.
