= Mansor Abd Rahman =

Malaysian politician

- منصور عبدالرحمن

Member of the Malaysian Parliament for Sik
- In office 5 May 2013 – 9 May 2018
- Preceded by: Che Uda Che Nik (PR–PAS)
- Succeeded by: Ahmad Tarmizi Sulaiman (GS–PAS)
- Majority: 2,807 (2013)

Personal details
- Born: Mansor bin Abd Rahman
- Citizenship: Malaysian
- Party: United Malays National Organisation (UMNO)
- Other political affiliations: Barisan Nasional (BN)
- Education: National University of Malaysia
- Occupation: Politician
- Profession: Medical doctor

Mansor bin Abd Rahman is a Malaysian politician and medical doctor who served as the Member of Parliament (MP) for Sik from May 2013 to May 2018. He is a member of the United Malays National Organisation (UMNO), a component party of the Barisan Nasional (BN) coalition.

A medical doctor by profession, Mansor entered Parliament at the 2013 election. At the time of his election he was the deputy chief of UMNO's Sik division. He defeated the incumbent Pan-Malaysian Islamic Party (PAS) MP, Che Uda Che Nik.

In the 2018 election, Mansor lost to Ahmad Tarmizi Sulaiman of PAS, in a three-corner fight with Azli Che Uda of Parti Amanah Negara (AMANAH) for the Sik parliamentary seat.

== Election results ==
Parliament of Malaysia
Year	Constituency	Candidate	Votes	Pct	Opponent(s)	Votes	Pct	Ballots cast	Majority	Turnout
2013	P013 Sik	Mansor Abd Rahman (UMNO)	22,084	52.48%	Che Uda Che Nik (PAS)	19,277	45.81%	42,077	2,807	89.94%
2018	P013 Sik	Mansor Abd Rahman (UMNO)	14,870	35.47%	Ahmad Tarmizi Sulaiman (PAS)	20,088	47.91%	42,772	5,218	84.89%
2018	P013 Sik	Mansor Abd Rahman (UMNO)	14,870	35.47%	Azli Che Uda (AMANAH)	6,970	16.62%	42,772	5,218	84.89%
