= Ahmad Tarmizi Sulaiman =

Malaysian politician

Yang Berhormat Tuan Ahmad Tarmizi Sulaiman SDK MP
- أَحْمَد تَرْمِذِي سُلَيْمَان
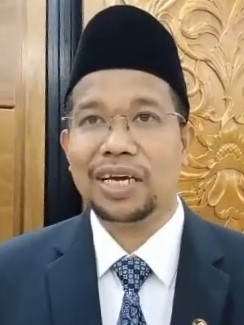

Member of the Malaysian Parliament for Sik
- Incumbent
- Assumed office 9 May 2018
- Preceded by: Mansor Abd Rahman (BN–UMNO)
- Majority: 42,772 (2018); 51,659 (2022)

Personal details
- Born: Ahmad Tarmizi bin Sulaiman; 7 August 1976 (age 50) Kampung Pau, Sik District, Kedah, Malaysia
- Party: Malaysian Islamic Party (PAS)
- Other political affiliations: Pakatan Rakyat (PR) (2008–2015); Gagasan Sejahtera (GS) (2018–2020); Perikatan Nasional (PN) (since 2020)
- Occupation: Politician

Ahmad Tarmizi bin Sulaiman is a Malaysian politician who has served as the Member of Parliament (MP) for Sik since May 2018. He was Deputy President of the Malaysian Consultative Council of Islamic Organisation (MAPIM). He is a member of the Malaysian Islamic Party (PAS), a component party of the Perikatan Nasional (PN), formerly Gagasan Sejahtera (GS) and Pakatan Rakyat (PR) coalitions.

== Political career ==
=== Candidate for the Member of the Kedah State Legislative Assembly (2013) ===
==== 2013 Kedah state election ====
In the 2013 Kedah state election, Ahmad Tarmizi made his electoral debut after being nominated by PR to contest for the Jeneri state seat. He lost to Mahadzir Abdul Hamid of Barisan Nasional (BN) by a minority of 2,060 votes.

=== Member of Parliament (since 2018) ===
==== 2018 general election ====
In the 2018 general election, Ahmad Tarmizi was nominated by GS to contest for the Sik federal seat. He won the seat and was elected to the Parliament as the Sik MP for the first term after defeating defending MP Mansor Abd Rahman of BN and Azli Che Uda of Pakatan Harapan (PH) by a majority of 42,772 votes.

==== 2022 general election ====
In the 2022 general election, Ahmad Tarmizi was nominated by PN to defend the Sik seat. He defended the seat and was reelected to Parliament as the Sik MP for the second term after defeating of Maizatulakmam Othman Ibrahim of BN and Latifah Mohammad Yatim of PH by a majority of 51,659 votes.

== Election results ==
Kedah State Legislative Assembly
Year	Constituency	Candidate	Votes	Pct	Opponent(s)	Votes	Pct	Ballots cast	Majority	Turnout
2013	N23 Jeneri	Ahmad Tarmizi Sulaiman (PAS)	10,258	45.44%	Mahadzir Abdul Hamid (UMNO)	12,318	54.56%	22,576	2,060	89.80%

Parliament of Malaysia
Year	Constituency	Candidate	Votes	Pct	Opponent(s)	Votes	Pct	Ballots cast	Majority	Turnout
2018	P013 Sik	Ahmad Tarmizi Sulaiman (PAS)	20,088	46.97%	Mansor Abd Rahman (UMNO)	14,870	34.77%	42,772	5,218	84.89%
2018	P013 Sik	Ahmad Tarmizi Sulaiman (PAS)	20,088	46.97%	Azli Che Uda (AMANAH)	6,970	16.30%	42,772	5,218	84.89%
2022	P013 Sik	Ahmad Tarmizi Sulaiman (PAS)	34,606	67.64%	Maizatulakmam Othman @Ibrahim (UMNO)	12,189	25.06%	21,787	51,659	81.05%
2022	P013 Sik	Ahmad Tarmizi Sulaiman (PAS)	34,606	67.64%	Latifah Mohammad Yatim (AMANAH)	3,736	7.30%	21,787	51,659	81.05%

== Honours ==
=== Honours of Malaysia ===
- Malaysia
  - Recipient of the 17th Yang di-Pertuan Agong Installation Medal (2024)
- Kedah
  - Companion of the Order of Loyalty to the Royal House of Kedah (SDK) (2023)
