= Public Accounts Committee (Malaysia) =

Bipartisan committee in Malaysia

The Public Accounts Committee (Malay: Jawatankuasa Kira-Kira Wang Negara) (PAC) is a select committee of the House of Representatives in the Parliament of Malaysia. The PAC derives its powers from the Dewan Rakyat which chooses the committee chairperson and deputy chairperson. Based on Standing Order 77(1), the PAC has the power to examine the accounts of the Malaysian government, the accounts of all public authorities, the reports of the auditor-general, and any other matters that "the committee may think fit" or matters referred to the PAC by the Dewan Rakyat.

Since 2018, the PAC has always made decisions by consensus. The PAC is a bi-partisan committee composed of two members from DAP, Bersatu, PAS, and UMNO with one member each from PKR, Amanah, Warisan and PBB.

== Mandate ==
- Examine the accounts of the Federation and the appropriation of the sums granted by Parliament to meet the public expenditure.
- Examine such accounts of public authorities and other bodies administering public funds as may be laid before the House of Representatives.
- Examine reports of the Auditor-General laid before the House of Representatives in accordance with Article 107 of the Federal Constitution.
- Examine such other matters as the Committee may think fit, or which may be referred to the Committee by the House of Representatives.
- Review and report on the Public Accounts of Malaysia.
- Examine all reports of the Auditor General of Malaysia.

== Investigations ==
The PAC's primary instrument is conducting hearings. The first step is to invite the controlling officer of the government ministry related to the investigation subject. If the officer's explanation suffices, the matter ends there. If not, the PAC will summon the cabinet minister and, if necessary, other witnesses such as the National Audit Department or project contractors. Complicated cases such as the LCS Saga required 10 hearing days and 21 witnesses.

Once the hearings are concluded, the PAC secretariat will begin a three-stage drafting process. Firstly, the secretariat will compile a report based on the Hansard (official parliamentary transcripts) and start writing a draft report. The second stage involves a "housekeeping meeting", where the secretariat will read out the entire report for the PAC's scrutiny. Any amendments will be done at this stage which is why the report takes many days to finalise. Every decision is by consensus. There were no heated arguments because facts and figures are being presented to all members. Everyone has the freedom to air their views. Eventually, the PAC will reach a consensus. Once the final draft is completed, the third stage involves a final verification process where PAC members will be given a chance to go through the entire report one more time before it goes to print.

== Membership ==
=== 15th Parliament ===
Party	Member	Position	Constituency	Term start	Term end
PN (BERSATU)	Mas Ermieyati Samsudin	Chairperson	Masjid Tanah	4 April 2023	Incumbent
PH (DAP)	Shu Qi Wong	Deputy Chairperson	Kluang	4 April 2023	16 July 2024
PH (DAP)	Teresa Suh Sim Kok	Deputy Chairperson	Seputeh	16 July 2024	Incumbent
BN (UMNO)	Noraini Ahmad	Member	Parit Sulong	23 May 2023	11 March 2024
PH (DAP)	Syahredzan Johan	Member	Bangi	23 May 2023	Incumbent
PH (DAP)	Vivian Shir Yee Wong	Member	Sandakan	23 May 2023	Incumbent
BN (UMNO)	Mohd Isam Mohd Isa	Member	Tampin	11 March 2024	Incumbent
PH (PKR)	Tze Tzin Sim	Member	Bayan Baru	23 May 2023	26 January 2026
PH (PKR)	Zaliha Mustafa	Member	Sekijang	26 January 2026	Incumbent
PH (PKR)	Zahir Hassan	Member	Wangsa Maju	23 May 2023	Incumbent
GPS (PBB)	Richard Rapu	Member	Betong	23 May 2023	Incumbent
PH (AMANAH)	Azli Yusof	Member	Shah Alam	23 May 2023	Incumbent
PN (BERSATU)	Ku Abdul Rahman Ku Ismail	Member	Kubang Pasu	23 May 2023	Incumbent
PN (PAS)	Ahmad Tarmizi Sulaiman	Member	Sik	23 May 2023	Incumbent
PN (BERSATU)	Ali Biju	Member	Saratok	23 May 2023	Incumbent
PN (PAS)	Halimah Ali	Member	Kapar	23 May 2023	Incumbent
BN (UMNO)	Adnan Abu Hassan	Member	Kuala Pilah	11 March 2024	Incumbent

=== 14th Parliament ===
Party	Member	Position	Constituency	Term start	Term end
BN (UMNO)	Noraini Ahmad	Member	Parit Sulong	12 August 2018	25 March 2019 (Note: Noraini Ahmad, Ahmad Hamzah and Takiyuddin Hassan resigned on 25 March 2019.)
BN (UMNO)	Noraini Ahmad	Chairman	Parit Sulong	11 April 2019 (Note: Noraini Ahmad was nominated to replace Ronald Kiandee as chairperson on 11 April 2019.)	10 March 2020
BN (UMNO)	Ronald Kiandee	Chairman	Beluran	7 August 2018	12 December 2018 (Note: Ronald Kiandee quit the United Malays National Organisation on 12 December 2018 and became an independent.)
IND	Ronald Kiandee	Chairman	Beluran	13 December 2018	14 March 2019 (Note: Ronald Kiandee joined the Malaysian United Indigenous Party on 15 March 2019.)
PH (BERSATU)	Ronald Kiandee	Chairman	Beluran	15 March 2019	11 April 2019
PH (DAP)	Kah Woh Wong	Deputy Chairman	Ipoh Timur	7 August 2018	27 August 2020
PH (DAP)	Kah Woh Wong	Chairman	Ipoh Timur	27 August 2020	10 October 2022
PH (PKR)	Nurul Izzah Anwar	Member	Permatang Pauh	4 December 2018	22 March 2019 (Note: Nurul Izzah Anwar resigned on 22 March 2019.)
PH (PKR)	Nurul Izzah Anwar	Member	Permatang Pauh	4 April 2019 (Note: Nurul Izzah Anwar rejoined on 4 April 2019.)	10 October 2022
PH (PKR)	Shiau Yoon Choong	Member	Tebrau	12 August 2018	3 November 2020
BN (UMNO)	Ahmad Hamzah	Member	Jasin	12 August 2018	25 March 2019
BN (UMNO)	Ahmad Hamzah	Member	Jasin	11 April 2019 (Note: Leader of the Opposition Ismail Sabri Yaakob reiterated that the MPs from Barisan Nasional (BN) will return to the PAC once an opposition MP had been appointed as chairperson.)	3 November 2020
GS (PAS)	Takiyuddin Hassan	Member	Kota Bharu	12 August 2018	10 March 2020 (Note: Takiyuddin Hassan later clarified that he does not intend to quit the PAC together with BN MPs.)
PH (PKR)	William Leong	Member	Selayang	4 December 2018	17 July 2019 (Note: William Leong left the PAC after being appointed as chair of the Major Public Appointments Select Committee and was replaced by Akmal Nasrullah Mohd Nasir.)
PH (PKR)	Akmal Nasrullah Mohd Nasir	Member	Johor Bahru	12 August 2018	3 December 2018 (Note: Nurul Izzah Anwar and William Leong replaced Akmal Nasrullah Mohd Nasir and Willie Mongin in a minor reshuffle on 4 December 2018.)
PH (PKR)	Akmal Nasrullah Mohd Nasir	Member	Johor Bahru	18 July 2019	3 November 2020
BN (UMNO)	Ismail Mohamed Said	Member	Kuala Krau	18 July 2019	10 March 2020
PH (AMANAH)	Hasanuddin Mohd Yunus	Member	Hulu Langat	12 August 2018	3 November 2020
PH (PKR)	Willie Mongin	Member	Puncak Borneo	12 August 2018	3 December 2018
PH (PKR)	Larry Soon	Member	Julau	4 December 2019	3 November 2020
GPS (PBB)	Robert Lawson Chuat Vincent Entering	Member	Betong	12 August 2018	3 November 2020
PH (PKR)	Chen Wong	Member	Subang	12 August 2018	4 December 2019
PH (DAP)	Hon Wai Wong	Member	Bukit Bendera	12 August 2018	3 November 2020
PH (DAP)	Shu Qi Wong	Member	Kluang	12 August 2018	10 October 2022
PH (BERSATU)	Muslimin Yahaya	Member	Sungai Besar	12 August 2018	24 February 2020
PN (BERSATU)	Muslimin Yahaya	Member	Sungai Besar	24 February 2020	10 March 2020
PN (BERSATU)	Azizah Mohd Dun	Deputy Chairman	Beaufort	27 August 2020	10 October 2022
GPS (PBB)	Lukanisman Awang Sauni	Member	Sibuti	3 November 2020	10 October 2022
WARISAN	Ahmad Hassan	Member	Papar	3 November 2020	10 October 2022
PH (AMANAH)	Mohd Hatta Ramli	Member	Lumut	3 November 2020	10 October 2022
PN (BERSATU)	Mohd Fasiah Mohd Fakeh	Member	Sabak Bernam	3 November 2020	10 October 2022
PN (BERSATU)	Yamani Hafez Musa	Member	Sipitang	3 November 2020	10 October 2022
BN (UMNO)	Noh Omar	Member	Tanjong Karang	3 November 2020	4 November 2020
BN (UMNO)	Ahmad Maslan	Member	Pontian	3 November 2020	11 November 2020
BN (UMNO)	Jalaluddin Alias	Member	Jelebu	3 November 2020	10 October 2022
PN (PAS)	Ahmad Fadhli Shaari	Member	Pasir Mas	3 November 2020	10 October 2022
PN (PAS)	Ahmad Tarmizi Sulaiman	Member	Sik	3 November 2020	10 October 2022
BN (UMNO)	Hasbullah Osman	Member	Gerik	12 November 2020	16 November 2020
BN (UMNO)	Ramli Mohd Nor	Member	Cameron Highlands	12 November 2020	10 October 2022
BN (UMNO)	Mohamad Alamin	Member	Kimanis	30 November 2020	10 October 2022
BN (UMNO)	Mohd Nizar Zakaria	Member	Parit	17 November 2020	10 October 2022

=== 13th Parliament ===
Party	Member	Position	Constituency	Term start	Term end
BN (UMNO)	Hasan Arifin	Chairman	Rompin	19 October 2015	7 April 2018
BN (UMNO)	Nur Jazlan Mohamed	Chairman	Pulai	18 July 2013	27 July 2015 (Note: Nur Jazlan Mohamed was appointed Deputy Minister of Home Affairs)
DAP	Tan Seng Giaw	Deputy Chairman	Kepong	18 July 2013	7 April 2018
PKR	Kamarul Baharin Abbas	Member	Telok Kemang	26 September 2013	7 April 2018
BN (UMNO)	Nawawi Ahmad	Member	Langkawi	19 October 2015	7 April 2018
BN (MCA)	Tee Yong Chua	Member	Labis	18 July 2013	25 June 2014 (Note: Chua Tee Yong was appointed Deputy Minister of Finance.)
BN (PBB)	Hasbi Habibollah	Member	Limbang	18 July 2013	7 April 2018
BN (UMNO)	Ahmad Hamzah	Member	Jasin	19 October 2015	7 April 2018
PAS	Takiyuddin Hassan	Member	Kota Bharu	19 October 2015	7 April 2018
PAS	Kamaruddin Jaffar	Member	Tumpat	26 September 2013	27 July 2015 (Note: Kamaruddin Jaffar resigned from the Malaysian Islamic Party (PAS) and joined the People's Justice Party (PKR).)
BN (MCA)	Nai Kwong Koh	Member	Alor Gajah	19 October 2015	7 April 2018
PKR	William Leong	Member	Selayang	26 September 2013	7 April 2018
BN (Gerakan)	Teck Meng Liang	Member	Simpang Renggam	18 July 2013	7 April 2018
BN (UPKO)	Marcus Mojigoh	Member	Putatan	19 October 2015	7 April 2018
BN (UMNO)	Reezal Merican Naina Merican	Member	Kepala Batas	18 July 2013	27 July 2015 (Note: Reezal Merican Naina Merican was appointed Deputy Minister of Foreign Affairs.)
DAP	Tony Pua	Member	Petaling Jaya Utara	26 September 2013	7 April 2018
BN (UMNO)	Mas Ermieyati Samsudin	Member	Masjid Tanah		27 July 2015 (Note: Mas Ermieyati Samsudin was appointed Deputy Minister of Tourism, Arts and Culture.)
BN (UMNO)	Abd. Aziz Sheikh Fadzir	Member	Kulim-Bandar Baharu	18 July 2013	7 April 2018
BN (UPKO)	Wilfred Madius Tangau	Member	Tuaran	18 July 2013	27 July 2015 (Note: Wilfred Madius Tangau was appointed Minister of Science, Technology and Innovation.)
BN (MCA)	Jeck Seng Wee	Member	Tanjong Piai	18 July 2013	7 April 2018

=== 12th Parliament ===
Party	Member	Constituency	Date of appointment
BN (UMNO)	Azmi Khalid, chairman	Padang Besar	26 May 2008
DAP	Tan Seng Giaw, deputy chairman	Kepong	26 May 2008

=== 11th Parliament ===
Party	Member	Constituency	Date of appointment
BN (UMNO)	Ramli Ngah Talib, chairman	Pasir Salak	24 May 2004
BN (UMNO)	Shahrir Abdul Samad, chairman	Johor Bahru	14 December 2004
DAP	Tan Seng Giaw, deputy chairman	Kepong	24 May 2004

=== 10th Parliament ===
Party	Member	Constituency	Date of appointment
BN (UMNO)	Ahmad Husni Hanadzlah, vice chairman	Tambun	15 February 2000
BN (UMNO)	Jamaluddin Jarjis, chairman	Rompin	15 February 2000

=== 9th Parliament ===
Party	Member	Constituency	Date of appointment
BN (UMNO)	Jamaluddin Jarjis, chairman	Rompin	12 June 1995
BN (UMNO)	Mohd. Zihin Mohd. Hassan, vice chairman	Larut	12 June 1995

=== 8th Parliament ===
Party	Member	Constituency	Date of appointment
BN (UMNO)	Affifudin Omar, chairman	Padang Terap	5 December 1990
BN (UMNO)	Mohd. Zihin Mohd. Hassan, vice chairman	Larut	5 December 1990

=== 7th Parliament ===
Party	Member	Constituency	Date of appointment
BN (UMNO)	Abdul Hadi Derani, vice chairman	Kota Setar	8 October 1986
BN (UMNO)	Ismail Said, chairman	Kemaman	8 October 1986

=== 6th Parliament ===
Party	Member	Constituency	Date of appointment
BN (UMNO)	Daud Taha, vice chairman	Batu Pahat	12 October 1982
BN (MCA)	Oo Gin Sun, chairman	Alor Setar	12 October 1982

=== 5th Parliament ===
Party	Member	Constituency	Date of appointment
BN (MCA)	Lee Boon Peng, chairman	Mantin	12 October 1978
BN (UMNO)	Mohd. Bakri Abdul Rais, vice chairman	Parit	12 October 1978

=== 4th Parliament ===
Party	Member	Constituency	Date of appointment
BN (UMNO)	Abdul Aziz Yeop, chairman	Padang Rengas	7 July 1975
BN (MCA)	Walter Loh Poh Khan, chairman	Selayang	6 November 1974

=== 3rd Parliament ===
Party	Member	Constituency	Date of appointment
Alliance (UMNO)	Hanafiah Hussain, chairman	Jerai	9 March 1971

=== 2nd Parliament ===
Party	Member	Constituency	Date of appointment
Alliance (MCA)	Tan Toh Hong, chairman	Bukit Bintang	26 May 1965; 15 June 1966; 15 June 1967; 6 June 1968
Alliance (UMNO)	Hanafiah Hussain, chairman	Jerai	20 May 1964

=== 1st Parliament ===
Party	Member	Constituency	Date of appointment
Alliance (UMNO)	Abdul Hamid Khan, chairman	Batang Padang	12 September 1959
Alliance (UMNO)	Ahmad Mohamed Shah, chairman	Johore Bahru Barat	20 April 1960; 20 April 1961; 26 April 1962; 23 May 1963
