= 2015 Rompin by-election =

Election in Malaysia

← 2013	5 May 2015	2018 →

Rompin seat in the Dewan Rakyat
	BN	PAS
Candidate	Hasan Arifin	Nazri Ahmad
Party	BN (UMNO)	PAS
Alliance		PR
Popular vote	23,796	14,901
Percentage	61.49%	38.51%
MP before election
Jamaluddin Jarjis
BN (UMNO)
Elected MP
Hasan Arifin
BN (UMNO)

A by-election was held for the Dewan Rakyat seat of Rompin, Pahang in Malaysia on 5 May following the nomination day on 22 April 2015. The seat fell vacant after member of parliament Jamaluddin Jarjis, from Barisan Nasional died in a helicopter crash in Semenyih, Selangor. Jamaluddin Jarjis won the seat with a majority of 15,114 votes in the general elections in 2013, beating Pan-Malaysian Islamic Party (PAS)'s Mohd Nuridah Salleh.

The Rompin by-election was a straight contest between ruling party United Malays National Organisation (UMNO)'s Hasan Arifin and opposition PAS's Nazri Ahmad.

BN held the seat, albeit with their majority slashed by almost half.

== Results ==
Malaysian general by-election, 5 May 2015: Rompin Upon the death of incumbent, Jamaluddin Jarjis
Party	Candidate	Votes	%	∆%
BN	Hasan Arifin	23,796	61.49	5.32
PAS	Nazri Ahmad	14,901	38.51	+ 5.32
Total valid votes		38,697	100.00	
Total rejected ballots		591		
Unreturned ballots		64		
Turnout		39,352	73.84	
Registered electors		53,294		
Majority		8,895	22.98	
BN hold		Swing		
Source(s) "Pilihan Raya Kecil P.091 Rompin". Election Commission of Malaysia. "Federal Government Gazette - Notice of Contested Election - By-election of the Dewan Rakyat of P.091 Rompin for the State of Pahang [P.U. (B) 182/2015]" (PDF). Attorney General's Chambers of Malaysia. 22 April 2015. "P. U. (B) 220/2015 Federal Government Gazette - Results of Contested Election and Statement of the Poll after the Official Addition of Votes for the By-election of P.091 Rompin" (PDF). Attorney General's Chambers of Malaysia. 7 May 2015.
