= Major Public Appointments Select Committee =

Committee appointed by the Malaysian House of Representatives

The Major Public Appointments Select Committee (Malay: Jawatankuasa Pilihan Khas Untuk Melantik Jawatan-Jawatan Utama Perkhidmatan Awam; Chinese: 馬來西亞任命公共服務職位專責委員會; Tamil: மலேசியா பொது சேவை தேர்வுக் குழுவை நியமிக்கிறது) is one of many select committees of the Malaysian House of Representatives, which scrutinises appointments of personnel to government-linked agencies (GLCs), government institutions and the civil service. It is among six new bipartisan parliamentary select committees announced by Speaker of the House of Representatives, Mohamad Ariff Md Yusof, on 4 December 2018 in an effort to improve the institutional system.

== Membership ==
=== 14th Parliament ===
As of December 2019, the committee's current members are as follows:

Member	Party	Constituency
William Leong Jee Keen MP (chairman)	PKR	Selayang
Datuk Dr. Hasan Bahrom MP	AMANAH	Tampin
Chan Ming Kai MP	PKR	Alor Setar
Fong Kui Lun MP	DAP	Bukit Bintang
Dato' Ngeh Koo Ham MP	DAP	Beruas
Dato' Tuan Ibrahim Tuan Man MP	PAS	Kubang Kerian
Dato' Sri Ismail Sabri Yaakob MP	UMNO	Bera

Former members of the committee are as follows:

Member	Party	Constituency	Successor
Syed Ibrahim Syed Noh MP	PKR	Ledang	Chan Ming Kai

== Chair of the Major Public Appointments Select Committee ==
Chair	Party	Constituency	First elected	Method
William Leong Jee Keen	PKR	Selayang	4 December 2018	Elected by the Speaker of the Dewan Rakyat

== See also ==
- Parliamentary Committees of Malaysia
