= Abdul Khalib Abdullah =

Malaysian politician

Yang Berhormat Dato' Abdul Khalib Abdullah عبدالخلاب عبدالله DIMP PPN MP

Member of the Malaysian Parliament for Rompin
- Incumbent
- Assumed office 19 November 2022
- Preceded by: Hasan Arifin (BN–UMNO)
- Majority: 1,438 (2022)

Personal details
- Born: Abdul Khalib bin Abdullah
- Party: Malaysian United Indigenous Party (BERSATU)
- Other political affiliations: Perikatan Nasional (PN)
- Education: Universiti Malaysia Pahang
- Occupation: Politician

Abdul Khalib bin Abdullah is a Malaysian politician who has served as the Member of Parliament (MP) for Rompin since November 2022. He is a member of the Malaysian United Indigenous Party (BERSATU), a component party of the Perikatan Nasional (PN) coalition.

== Election results ==
Parliament of Malaysia
Year	Constituency	Candidate	Votes	Pct	Opponent(s)	Votes	Pct	Ballots cast	Majority	Turnout
2022	P091 Rompin	Abdul Khalib Abdullah (BERSATU)	31,589	47.20%	Hasan Arifin (UMNO)	30,151	45.05%	68,233	1,438	75.09%
2022	P091 Rompin	Abdul Khalib Abdullah (BERSATU)	31,589	47.20%	Erman Shah Jaios (PKR)	4,779	7.14%	68,233	1,438	75.09%
2022	P091 Rompin	Abdul Khalib Abdullah (BERSATU)	31,589	47.20%	Harmizi Hussain (IND)	408	0.61%	68,233	1,438	75.09%

== Honours ==
=== Honours of Malaysia ===
- Malaysia
  - Medal of the Order of the Defender of the Realm (PPN) (2001)
  - Recipient of the 17th Yang di-Pertuan Agong Installation Medal (2024)
- Pahang
  - Knight Companion of the Order of the Crown of Pahang (DIMP) – Dato' (2008)

== See also ==
- Rompin (federal constituency)
