= William Leong =

Malaysian politician and lawyer

Yang Berhormat Tuan William Leong MP
- 梁自坚

Chairman of the Major Public Appointments Select Committee
- Incumbent
- Assumed office 4 December 2018
- Preceded by: Position established

Member of the Malaysian Parliament for Selayang
- Incumbent
- Assumed office 8 March 2008
- Preceded by: Chan Kong Choy (BN–MCA)
- Majority: 3,567 (2008); 17,846 (2013); 40,657 (2018); 23,619 (2022)

Treasurer-General of the People's Justice Party
- Incumbent
- Assumed office 20 July 2022
- President: Anwar Ibrahim
- Preceded by: Lee Chean Chung

Personal details
- Born: William Leong Jee Keen; 27 January 1957 (age 69) Ipoh, Perak, Federation of Malaya (now Malaysia)
- Citizenship: Malaysia
- Party: People's Justice Party (PKR)
- Other political affiliations: Pakatan Rakyat (PR) (2008–2015); Pakatan Harapan (PH) (since 2015)
- Children: 3
- Occupation: Politician
- Profession: Lawyer
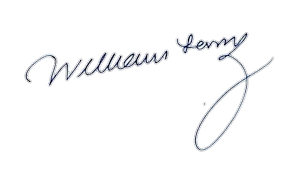
- Signature
- Website: williamleongjeekeen.blogspot.com
- William Leong on Parliament of Malaysia

William Leong Jee Keen (simplified Chinese: 梁自坚; traditional Chinese: 梁自堅; pinyin: Liáng Zìjiān; Jyutping: Loeng4 Zi6 Gin1; Pe̍h-ōe-jī: Niô͘ Chū-kian; born 27 January 1957) is a Malaysian politician and lawyer who has served as the Member of Parliament (MP) for Selayang since March 2008 and Chairman of the Major Public Appointments Select Committee since December 2018. He is a member of the People's Justice Party (PKR), a component party of the Pakatan Harapan (PH) and formerly Pakatan Rakyat (PR) coalitions. He has also served as the Treasurer-General of PKR since July 2022.

== Early life ==
Born on 27 January 1957, in Ipoh, Perak, William Leong Jee Keen later moved to the Klang Valley. He came from an athletic family: his father was an athlete, and his mother, a Christian, ran a sporting goods store. From the age of 12, he adored athletics, football, basketball, and taekwondo. He represented his school and the state of Selangor in various athletics competitions, achieving numerous victories and aspiring to compete in the Olympics. At 14, he won the Best Athlete award in a state competition and was fortunate enough to train with the national team. He completed his secondary education at La Salle Secondary School in Klang and the Pre-University Class (Form 6) at St. John's Secondary School in Kuala Lumpur. He then pursued a Bachelor of Laws degree at the National University of Singapore.

Before entering politics, he was admitted to the Malaysian Bar on 11 January 1982. He worked as a legal assistant at a law firm from 1982 to 1985, and was subsequently appointed junior partner. In 1985, William Leong Jee Keen and four other lawyers took over the management of the firm and subsequently established a new law firm. The firm had an excellent reputation, representing local and international companies listed on the Bursa Malaysia Stock Exchange in commercial, litigation, and corporate matters, many of which were listed in the Fortune Global 500.

In the 1980s, Leong played a key role in various corporate restructurings, most of which eventually grew into major Malaysian conglomerates. He entered the corporate world in 1994 and held senior executive positions at several securities firms, including Deputy Managing Director of a local company and Chief Executive Officer and Acting Executive Chairman of one of the 20 largest companies in Southeast Asia. He returned to law in 1998 and established his own firm.

== Political career ==
Leong joined PKR at the encouragement of Anwar Ibrahim, despite having no prior political background. In 2007, he was appointed PKR treasurer general. Before being elected as a Member of Parliament, PKR leader Anwar Ibrahim had suggested that Leong run for the Petaling Jaya Selatan constituency in the 2008 general election, as he was a lawyer, a professional, and fluent in English, which made him more likely to win. However, Leong declined the offer, as he did not want to jeopardize their friendship with the incumbent MP, Donald Lim Siang Chai, who was also his good friend.

He ultimately ran in Selayang, then a stronghold of the MCA in Selangor, and was elected MP for the constituency, defeating MCA candidate Lee Li Yew with a majority of 3,567 votes from the ruling Barisan Nasional (BN) coalition.

In the 2013 general election, Donald Lim Siang Chai switched to Selayang, forcing Liang to defend his seat. He inevitably faced off against him, successfully retaining his seat with a 17,846-vote majority. Despite facing off twice in the general election, Leong stated that their friendship remained unaffected. Leong and Rawang state assemblyman Gan Pei Nei also rerouted the high-voltage power lines originally planned to pass through Rawang New Village during their terms.

In August 2017, Leong resigned from the PKR political bureau, citing dissatisfaction with PKR's continued collaboration with Malaysian Islamic Party (PAS) following the Pakatan Rakyat split. He also announced that he would not contest in the next general election, retaining his membership and position as a Supreme Council member. However, at the behest of voters, he changed his mind and ran for the Selayang parliamentary seat for the third time. In the 2018 general election, he faced off against Kang Meng Fuat, the political secretary of former Minister of Transport Liow Tiong Lai, and was re-elected with a majority of 40,657 votes.

== Personal life ==
Leong is a lawyer and has three children.

== Election results ==
Parliament of Malaysia
Year	Constituency	Candidate	Votes	Pct	Opponent(s)	Votes	Pct	Ballots cast	Majority	Turnout
2008	P097 Selayang	William Leong Jee Keen (PKR)	30,701	51.67%	Lee Li Yew (MCA)	27,134	45.67%	60,920	3,567	76.57%
2008	P097 Selayang	William Leong Jee Keen (PKR)	30,701	51.67%	Koh Swe Yong (PRM)	1,332	2.24%	60,920	3,567	76.57%
2013	P097 Selayang	William Leong Jee Keen (PKR)	52,287	57.40%	Donald Lim Siang Chai (MCA)	34,441	37.81%	92,528	17,846	87.38%
2013	P097 Selayang	William Leong Jee Keen (PKR)	52,287	57.40%	Mohd Hazizi Abdul Rahman (BERJASA)	4,152	4.56%	92,528	17,846	87.38%
2018	P097 Selayang	William Leong Jee Keen (PKR)	60,158	61.38%	Kang Meng Fuat (MCA)	19,501	19.90%	99,450	40,657	85.60%
2018	P097 Selayang	William Leong Jee Keen (PKR)	60,158	61.38%	Hashim Abd Karim (PAS)	18,343	18.72%	99,450	40,657	85.60%
2022	P097 Selayang	William Leong Jee Keen (PKR)	72,773	50.23%	Abdul Rashid Asari (BERSATU)	49,154	33.93%	144,841	23,619	79.81%
2022	P097 Selayang	William Leong Jee Keen (PKR)	72,773	50.23%	Chan Wun Hoong (MCA)	19,425	13.41%	144,841	23,619	79.81%
2022	P097 Selayang	William Leong Jee Keen (PKR)	72,773	50.23%	Salleh Amiruddin (PEJUANG)	2,584	1.78%	144,841	23,619	79.81%
2022	P097 Selayang	William Leong Jee Keen (PKR)	72,773	50.23%	Muhammad Zaki Omar (IND)	945	0.65%	144,841	23,619	79.81%

== Honours ==
=== Honours of Malaysia ===
- Malaysia
  - Recipient of the 17th Yang di-Pertuan Agong Installation Medal (2024)

== See also ==
- Major Public Appointments Select Committee
- Selayang (federal constituency)
