= Richard Rapu =

Malaysian politician

Yang Berhormat Dato Dr Richard Rapu PSBS PBK KMN MP

Member of the Malaysian Parliament for Betong
- Incumbent
- Assumed office 19 November 2022
- Preceded by: Robert Lawson Chuat Vincent Entering (BN–PBB)
- Majority: 11,302 (2022)

Personal details
- Born: 8 December 1963 (age 62) Sarawak, Malaysia
- Party: Parti Pesaka Bumiputera Bersatu (PBB)
- Other political affiliations: Barisan Nasional (BN) (–2018); Gabungan Parti Sarawak (GPS) (2018–present)
- Education: Universiti Pertanian Malaysia (DVM)
- Occupation: Politician
- Profession: Veterinarian

Richard Rapu @ Aman anak Begri is a Malaysian politician and veterinarian who served as Member of Parliament for Betong seat since November 2022. He is a member of Parti Pesaka Bumiputera Bersatu (PBB), a component party of Gabungan Parti Sarawak (GPS) coalition.

== Election results ==
Parliament of Malaysia
Year	Constituency	Candidate	Votes	Pct	Opponent(s)	Votes	Pct	Ballots cast	Majority	Turnout
2022	P204 Betong	Richard Rapu (PBB)	16,479	61.69%	Patrick Kamis (PKR)	5,177	19.38%	27,239	11,302	63.99%
2022	P204 Betong	Richard Rapu (PBB)	16,479	61.69%	Hasbie Satar (IND)	5,057	18.93%	27,239	11,302	63.99%

== Honours ==
=== Honours of Malaysia ===
- Malaysia
  - Officer of the Order of the Defender of the Realm (KMN) (2021)
  - Recipient of the 17th Yang di-Pertuan Agong Installation Medal (2024)
- Sarawak
  - Commander of the Order of the Star of Sarawak (PSBS) – Dato (2024)
  - Officer of the Order of the Star of Hornbill Sarawak (PBK) (2014)
  - Silver Medal of the Sarawak Independence Diamond Jubilee Medal (2024)
