= Hasan Arifin =

Malaysian politician and corporate member

Yang Berbahagia Dato' Sri Hasan Arifin SSAP DSAP

Chairman of the Tenaga Nasional Berhad
- In office 1 October 2021 – 1 January 2023
- Minister: Takiyuddin Hassan (2021–2022); Nik Nazmi Nik Ahmad (2022–2023)
- Chief Executive Officer: Baharin Din
- Preceded by: Mahdzir Khalid
- Succeeded by: Abdul Razak Abdul Majid

Chairman of the Public Accounts Committee
- In office 19 October 2015 – 7 April 2018
- Nominated by: Najib Razak
- Appointed by: Pandikar Amin Mulia
- Deputy: Tan Seng Giaw
- Preceded by: Nur Jazlan Mohamed
- Succeeded by: Ronald Kiandee
- Constituency: Rompin

Deputy Menteri Besar of Pahang
- In office 30 April 1995 – 2 December 1999
- Monarch: Ahmad Shah
- Menteri Besar: Mohd Khalil Yaakob (1995–1999); Adnan Yaakob (25 May–2 December 1999)
- Preceded by: Abdul Aziz Abdul Rahman
- Succeeded by: Tan Aminuddin Ishak
- Constituency: Bukit Ibam

Member of the Pahang State Executive Council (Public Amenities)
- In office 30 April 1995 – 2 December 1999
- Monarch: Ahmad Shah
- Menteri Besar: Mohd Khalil Yaakob (1995–1999); Adnan Yaakob (25 May–2 December 1999)
- Constituency: Bukit Ibam

Member of the Malaysian Parliament for Rompin
- In office 5 May 2015 – 19 November 2022
- Preceded by: Jamaluddin Jarjis (BN–UMNO)
- Succeeded by: Abdul Khalib Abdullah (PN–BERSATU)
- Majority: 8,895 (2015); 11,395 (2018)

Member of the Pahang State Legislative Assembly for Bukit Ibam
- In office 21 October 1990 – 21 March 2004
- Preceded by: Abdul Jabbar Ibrahim (BN–UMNO)
- Succeeded by: Mohamad Sahfri Ab Aziz (BN–UMNO)
- Majority: 5,383 (1990); 4,334 (1995); 2,557 (1999)

Member of the Pahang State Legislative Assembly for Tioman
- In office 3 August 1986 – 21 October 1990
- Preceded by: Position established
- Succeeded by: Mustafar Abu Bakar (BN–UMNO)
- Majority: 3,586 (1986)

Member of the Pahang State Legislative Assembly for Rompin
- In office 26 April 1982 – 3 August 1986
- Preceded by: Abdul Latif Kantan (BN–UMNO)
- Succeeded by: Position abolished
- Majority: 3,036 (1982)

Other roles
- 2021–2022: Chairman of the Special Select Committee on Finance and Economy
- 2020–2021: Chairman of the Pengurusan Aset Air Sdn Bhd
- 2010–2015: Member of the Board of the UDA Holdings
- 1995–1998: Chairman of the Southeast Pahang Regional Development Board
- 1991–1995: Member of the Board of the Federal Land Development Authority
- 1990–1999: Chairman of the Pahang State Agricultural Development Board

Faction represented in Dewan Rakyat
- 2015–2022: Barisan Nasional

Faction represented in Pahang State Legislative Assembly
- 1982–2004: Barisan Nasional

Personal details
- Born: Hasan bin Arifin; 28 April 1953 (age 73) Kampung Simpang Sepayang, Kuala Rompin, Rompin, Pahang, Federation of Malaya (now Malaysia)
- Citizenship: Malaysian
- Party: United Malays National Organisation (UMNO)
- Other political affiliations: Barisan Nasional (BN)
- Spouse: Rozida Karim
- Education: University of Malaya (BEc); Asian Institute of Management (Management)
- Occupation: Politician; corporate member

Hasan bin Arifin (born 28 April 1953) is a Malaysian politician and corporate member who served as Chairman of the Tenaga Nasional Berhad (TNB) from October 2021 to his resignation in January 2023, Chairman of the Public Accounts Committee (PAC) from October 2015 to April 2018, Deputy Menteri Besar of Pahang and Member of the Pahang State Executive Council (EXCO) from April 1995 to December 1999, Member of Parliament (MP) for Rompin from May 2015 to November 2022, Member of the Pahang State Legislative Assembly (MLA) for Bukit Ibam from October 1990 to March 2004, Tioman from August 1986 to October 1990 and Rompin from April 1982 to August 1986. He also served in various other positions in politics and corporate sector, namely the Chairman of the Special Select Committee from 2021 to 2022, Chairman of the Pengurusan Aset Air Sdn Bhd from 2020 to 2021, Member of the Board of the UDA Holdings from 2010 to 2015, Chairman of the Southeast Pahang Regional Development Board (DARA) from 1995 to 1998, Member of the Board of the Federal Land Development Authority (FELDA) from 1991 to 1995 as well as Chairman of the Pahang State Agricultural Development Board from 1990 to 1999. He is a member of the United Malays National Organisation (UMNO), a component party of the Barisan Nasional (BN) coalition. His tenure as the Chairman of PAC has been controversial for the 1Malaysia Development Berhad (1MDB) scandal.

== Political career ==
=== Chairman of Public Accounts Committee ===
Hasan was nominated by Prime Minister of Malaysia Najib Razak to helm the post of chairman of the Public Accounts Committee (PAC) and appointed by Speaker of the House of Representatives Pandikar Amin Mulia on 19 October 2015. He took over from Nur Jazlan Mohamed who resigned from the PAC after being appointed Deputy Minister of Home Affairs by Najib.

== Controversies ==
During his PAC Chairman tenure, Hasan was accused of tampering with the investigation into the 1Malaysia Development Berhad scandal involving then-Prime Minister Najib by Petaling Jaya Utara MP and fellow PAC member Tony Pua. He was accused to have, among many others, refusing to call additional witnesses before the PAC, deleting evidence from PAC's 1Malaysia Development Bhd (1MDB) report and ignoring evidence crucial to the investigation. Following his appointment, requests to reopen the investigation was rejected and it was later revealed that he had made attempts to shield Low Taek Jho, better known as Jho Low, the man who was central to the 1MDB scandal, by editing out portions involving Low in the PAC report. Earlier, he had also overturned his predecessor's decision to summon Low to the PAC for questioning.

According to ex-1MDB chief executive officer (CEO) Shahrol Azral Ibrahim Halmi's court testimony in the High Court, the PAC hearings on the 1MDB fiasco in 2010 and 2015 was nothing short of a farce where Hassan as PAC Chairman together with PAC member Abdul Rahman Dahlan along with fugitive businessman Jho Low had conspired to plot the outcome of the hearings. Hassan and Abdul Rahman who are both MP from BN, were exposed by Shahrol to be in conflict of interests since they were part of the PAC members who coached him on what to say during the PAC hearings.

== Election results ==
Pahang State Legislative Assembly
Year	Constituency	Candidate	Votes	Pct	Opponent(s)	Votes	Pct	Ballots cast	Majority	Turnout
1982	N28 Rompin	Hasan Arifin (UMNO)	3,844	76.93%	Abdul Hak Fadzil (PAS)	808	16.17%	5,130	3,036	70.18%
1982	N28 Rompin	Hasan Arifin (UMNO)	3,844	76.93%	Musa Hasni Abdul Hamid (IND)	345	6.90%	5,130	3,036	70.18%
1986	N33 Tioman	Hasan Arifin (UMNO)	4,641	81.48%	Abd Rauof Abd Majid (PAS)	1,055	18.52%	6,048	3,586	62.87%
1990	N32 Bukit Ibam	Hasan Arifin (UMNO)	9,289	70.40%	Othman Bakar (PAS)	3,906	29.60%	13,629	5,383	79.98%
1995	N36 Bukit Ibam	Hasan Arifin (UMNO)	6,762	73.42%	Ismail Mat Tahar (PAS)	2,448	26.58%	9,475	4,314	80.22%
1999	N36 Bukit Ibam	Hasan Arifin (UMNO)	6,035	63.44%	Sukri Ahmad (PAS)	3,478	36.56%	9,908	2,557	79.85%

Parliament of Malaysia
Year	Constituency	Candidate	Votes	Pct	Opponent(s)	Votes	Pct	Ballots cast	Majority	Turnout
2015	P091 Rompin	Hasan Arifin (UMNO)	23,796	61.49%	Nazri Ahmad (PAS)	14,901	38.51%	39,352	8,895	73.84%
2018	P091 Rompin	Hasan Arifin (UMNO)	26,628	53.54%	M Shahrul Nizam Abdul Haliff (PAS)	15,233	30.63%	50,905	11,395	82.21%
2018	P091 Rompin	Hasan Arifin (UMNO)	26,628	53.54%	Sitarunisah Ab Kadir (PKR)	7,876	15.84%	50,905	11,395	82.21%
2022	P091 Rompin	Hasan Arifin (UMNO)	30,151	45.05%	Abdul Khalib Abdullah (BERSATU)	31,589	47.20%	66,927	1,438	75.09%
2022	P091 Rompin	Hasan Arifin (UMNO)	30,151	45.05%	Erman Shah Jaios (PKR)	4,779	7.14%	66,927	1,438	75.09%
2022	P091 Rompin	Hasan Arifin (UMNO)	30,151	45.05%	Harmizi Hussain (IND)	408	0.61%	66,927	1,438	75.09%

== Honours ==
- Pahang
  - Knight Grand Companion of the Order of Sultan Ahmad Shah of Pahang (SSAP) – Dato' Sri (2015)
  - Knight Companion of the Order of Sultan Ahmad Shah of Pahang (DSAP) – Dato'

== See also ==
- Rompin (federal constituency)
