= Hanafiah Hussain =

Malaysian politician (born 1927)

Yang Berbahagia Tan Sri Dato' Hanafiah Hussain PMN DSDK AMN
- حنفية حسين

Chairperson of the Public Accounts Committee
- In office 1971–1974
- In office 1964–1965

Member of the Malaysian Parliament for Jerai
- In office 1964–1974
- Preceded by: Mohamed Ismail Mohd Yusof (UMNO)
- Succeeded by: Sanusi Junid (UMNO)

Personal details
- Born: 16 April 1927 (age 99) Yan, Kedah, Federation of Malaya (now Malaysia)
- Party: United Malays National Organisation (UMNO)
- Spouse: Puan Sri Datin Mimi Abdullah
- Children: 3
- Occupation: Politician, accountant

Tan Sri Dato' Hanafiah bin Hussain (born 16 April 1927) is a Malaysian politician and accountant.

== Background ==
Hanafiah was born in Yan, Kedah to ethnic Malay parents of Acehnese desecent who immigrated from Aceh, Sumatra, Indonesia, long prior to his birth during the British and Dutch colonial rules of both Malaya and the East Indies. He attended the Sultan Abdul Hamid College and gained an accountancy degree from Victoria University of Manchester in 1953, followed by a professional qualification from the Association of Chartered Accountants and later as a fellow of the Institute of Chartered Accountants in England and Wales (ICAEW).

== Politics ==
Hanafiah participated actively in politics and later on, in trade and diplomacy. From 1964 to 1974, he served as Member of Parliament for the Jerai, Kedah constituency. From 1965 to 1970, he was UMNO Treasurer-General, Member of the UMNO Supreme Council, and Chairman of the Parliament's Public Accounts Committee for two terms.

== Election results ==
Parliament of Malaysia
Year	Constituency	Candidate	Votes	Pct	Opponent(s)	Votes	Pct	Ballots cast	Majority	Turnout
1964	P010 Jerai	Hanafiah Hussain (UMNO)	14,002	66.40%	Othman Yunus (PAS)	7,085	33.60%	21,788	6,917	77.07%
1969	P010 Jerai	Hanafiah Hussain (UMNO)	13,182	55.87%	Abdul Rashid Abdul Razak (PAS)	10,414	44.13%	24,333	2,768	76.45%

== Honours and awards ==
- Malaya
  - Member of the Order of the Defender of the Realm (AMN) (1961)
- Malaysia
  - Recipient of the Malaysian Commemorative Medal (Silver) (PPM) (1965)
  - Commander of the Order of Loyalty to the Crown of Malaysia (PSM) – Tan Sri (2001)
- Kedah
  - Knight Companion of the Order of Loyalty to the Royal House of Kedah (DSDK) – Dato' (1988)
- Lifetime achievement award from the Malaysian Institute of Accountants.
- Anugerah Tokoh Melayu Terbilang 2017 from UMNO.
