= Rompin (federal constituency) =

Federal constituency of Pahang, Malaysia

Rompin (P091)
Pahang constituency

Federal constituency
- Legislature: Dewan Rakyat
- MP: Abdul Khalib Abdullah; PN
- Constituency created: 1984
- First contested: 1986
- Last contested: 2022

Demographics
- Population (2020): 100,897
- Electors (2022): 89,131
- Area (km²): 5,390
- Pop. density (per km²): 18.7

Rompin is a federal constituency in Rompin District, Pahang, Malaysia, that has been represented in the Dewan Rakyat since 1986.

The federal constituency was created in the 1984 redistribution and is mandated to return a single member to the Dewan Rakyat under the first past the post voting system.

== Demographics ==
https://live.chinapress.com.my/ge15/parliament/PAHANG

Ethnic breakdown of Rompin's electorate as of 2022
1. Malay (83.2%)
2. Other ethnicities (13.5%)
3. Chinese (2.43%)
4. Indian (0.87%)

As of 2020, Rompin has a population of 100,897 people.

Age breakdown of Rompin's electorate as of 2022
1. 18-20 (6.51%)
2. 21-29 (22.8%)
3. 30-39 (28.8%)
4. 40-49 (16.7%)
5. 50-59 (10.4%)
6. 60-69 (10.0%)
7. 70-79 (4.14%)
8. 80-89 (0.65%)
9. above 90 (0.13%)
Gender breakdown of Rompin's electorate as of 2022
1. Male (49.8%)
2. Female (50.2%)

== History ==
=== Polling districts ===
According to the federal gazette issued on 31 October 2022, the Rompin constituency is divided into 38 polling districts.

State constituency	Polling district	Code	Location
Bukit Ibam（N40）	Bandar Bukit Ibam	091/40/01	SMA Bukit Ibam
Bukit Ibam（N40）	Kampung Aur	091/40/02	SK Kampung Aur; SK Buluh Nipis
Bukit Ibam（N40）	Kota Bahagia	091/40/03	SK Ladang Kota Bahagia
Bukit Ibam（N40）	Bukit Serok	091/40/04	SK Bukit Serok; SK Melati
Bukit Ibam（N40）	FELDA Keratong 2	091/40/05	SK LKTP Keratong 2
Bukit Ibam（N40）	FELDA Keratong 3	091/40/06	SK LKTP Keratong 3
Bukit Ibam（N40）	FELDA Keratong 5	091/40/07	SA Rakyat Al-Asriah FELDA Keratong 5
Bukit Ibam（N40）	FELDA Keratong 7	091/40/08	SK LKTP Keratong 7
Bukit Ibam（N40）	FELDA Keratong 4	091/40/09	SK LKTP Keratong 4
Bukit Ibam（N40）	FELDA Keratong 1	091/40/10	SK LKTP Keratong 1
Bukit Ibam（N40）	FELDA Selancar 1	091/40/11	SMK Selancar
Muadzam Shah（N41）	Muadzam Shah	091/41/01	SK Bukit Ridan
Muadzam Shah（N41）	Bukit Ridan	091/41/02	Dewan Stesen MARDI Muadzam Shah
Muadzam Shah（N41）	FELDA Keratong 10	091/41/03	SK LKTP Keratong 10
Muadzam Shah（N41）	FELDA Keratong 9	091/41/04	SK Perantau Damai
Muadzam Shah（N41）	FELDA Keratong 8	091/41/05	SK LKTP Keratong 8
Muadzam Shah（N41）	Kedaik	091/41/06	SK Kedaik
Muadzam Shah（N41）	Gading	091/41/07	Balai Raya Kampung Gading; Tadika KEMAS / JAKOA Kampung Kerpal
Muadzam Shah（N41）	Leban Chondong	091/41/08	SK Leban Chondong
Muadzam Shah（N41）	FELDA Keratong 6	091/41/09	SK LKTP Keratong 6
Muadzam Shah（N41）	Chenderawasih	091/41/10	SK Chenderawasih
Muadzam Shah（N41）	FELDA Selancar	091/41/11	SK LKTP Selancar 2
Muadzam Shah（N41）	FELDA Selancar 3	091/41/12	SK LKTP Selancar 3
Tioman（N42）	Sungai Puteri	091/42/01	SK Sungai Puteri
Tioman（N42）	Kuala Rompin	091/42/02	SMK Rompin
Tioman（N42）	Bandar Baru Rompin	091/42/03	SK Rompin
Tioman（N42）	Pontian	091/42/04	SK Pontian
Tioman（N42）	FELDA Selendang	091/42/05	SK LKTP Selendang 1; SK Sungai Mok
Tioman（N42）	Sarang Tiong	091/42/06	SK Sarang Tiong
Tioman（N42）	Kampung Janglau	091/42/07	SK Janglau
Tioman（N42）	Kampung Jawa	091/42/08	SMK Tanjung Gemok
Tioman（N42）	Endau	091/42/09	SK Tanjung Gemok
Tioman（N42）	Pianggu	091/42/10	SK Pianggu
Tioman（N42）	Denai	091/42/11	SK Denai
Tioman（N42）	Tekek	091/42/12	SMK Tekek; Salang Pusaka Resort Tioman
Tioman（N42）	Juara	091/42/13	SK Juara
Tioman（N42）	Kampung Genting	091/42/14	Balai Raya Kampung Genting
Tioman（N42）	Mukut	091/42/15	SK Mukut

=== Representation history ===
Members of Parliament for Rompin
Parliament	No	Years	Member	Party	Vote Share
Constituency created from Pekan
7th	P081	1986–1990	Mohamed Amin Daud (محمد أمين داود)	BN (UMNO)	16,118; 76.83%
8th	P081	1990–1995	Jamaluddin Jarjis (جمال الدين محمد جرجيس)	BN (UMNO)	20,994; 72.74%
9th	P085	1995–1999	Jamaluddin Jarjis (جمال الدين محمد جرجيس)	BN (UMNO)	18,531; 76.46%
10th	P085	1999–2004	Jamaluddin Jarjis (جمال الدين محمد جرجيس)	BN (UMNO)	15,907; 61.69%
11th	P091	2004–2008	Jamaluddin Jarjis (جمال الدين محمد جرجيس)	BN (UMNO)	19,359; 65.92%
12th	P091	2008–2013	Jamaluddin Jarjis (جمال الدين محمد جرجيس)	BN (UMNO)	21,308; 66.72%
13th	P091	2013–2015	Jamaluddin Jarjis (جمال الدين محمد جرجيس)	BN (UMNO)	30,040; 66.81%
13th	P091	2015–2018	Hasan Arifin (حسن عريفين)	BN (UMNO)	23,796; 61.49%
14th	P091	2018–2022	Hasan Arifin (حسن عريفين)	BN (UMNO)	26,628; 53.54%
15th	P091	2022–present	Abdul Khalib Abdullah (عبدالخلاب عبدالله)	PN (BERSATU)	31,589; 47.20%

=== State constituency ===
Parliamentary constituency	State constituency						
Parliamentary constituency	1955–59*	1959–1974	1974–1986	1986–1995	1995–2004	2004–2018	2018–present
Rompin				Bukit Ibam			
Rompin				Cini			
Rompin					Muadzam Shah		
Rompin				Tioman			

=== Historical boundaries ===
State Constiteuncy	Area			
State Constiteuncy	1984	1994	2003	2018
Bukit Ibam	Bukit Ibam; Bandar Tun Abdul Razak; FELDA Keratong; FELDA Selancar; Muadzam Shah	Bandar Tun Abdul Razak; Bukit Serok; FELDA Keratong 1-5 & 7; FELDA Selancar 1; Kota Bahagia		
Cini	Cini; FELDA Chini; Kampung Gumum; Kampung Temai; Lepar			
Muadzam Shah		Chenderawasih; FELDA Keratong 6, 8-10; FELDA Selancar 2-3; Kampung Gading; Muadzam Shah		
Tioman	FELDA Selendang; Kampung Orang Asli Batu 8; Pulau Tioman; Rompin; Tanjung Gemok			

=== Current state assembly members ===
No.	State Constituency	Member	Coalition (Party)
N40	Bukit Ibam	Nazri Ahmad	PN (PAS)
N41	Muadzam Shah	Razali Kassim	BN (UMNO)
N42	Tioman	Mohd Johari Hussain	BN (UMNO)

=== Local governments & postcodes ===
No.	State Constituency	Local Government	Postcode
N40	Bukit Ibam	Rompin District Council	26680 Pekan; 26700 Muadzam Shah; 26800, 26810, 26820 Kuala Rompin; 26900 Bandar Tun Abdul Razak
N41	Muadzam Shah	Rompin District Council	26680 Pekan; 26700 Muadzam Shah; 26800, 26810, 26820 Kuala Rompin; 26900 Bandar Tun Abdul Razak
N42	Tioman	Rompin District Council; Tioman Development Authority (Tioman Island area)	26680 Pekan; 26700 Muadzam Shah; 26800, 26810, 26820 Kuala Rompin; 26900 Bandar Tun Abdul Razak

== Election results ==
Malaysian general election, 2022
Party	Candidate	Votes	%	∆%
PN	Abdul Khalib Abdullah	31,589	47.20	▲47.20
BN	Hasan Arifin	30,151	45.05	▼8.49
PH	Erman Shah Jaios	4,779	7.14	▲7.14
Independent	Harmizi Hussain	408	0.61	▲0.61
Total valid votes		66,927	100.00	
Total rejected ballots		1,129		
Unreturned ballots		177		
Turnout		68,233	75.09	▼7.12
Registered electors		89,131		
Majority		1,438	2.15	▼20.76
PN gain from BN		Swing		?
Source(s) https://lom.agc.gov.my/ilims/upload/portal/akta/outputp/1753278/PUB611_2022.pdf

Malaysian general election, 2018
Party	Candidate	Votes	%	∆%
BN	Hasan Arifin	26,628	53.54	▼7.95
PAS	M Shahrul Nizam Abdul Haliff	15,233	30.63	▼7.88
PKR	Sitarunisah Ab Kadir	7,876	15.84	▲15.84
Total valid votes		49,737	100.00	
Total rejected ballots		917		
Unreturned ballots		251		
Turnout		50,905	82.21	▲8.37
Registered electors		61,918		
Majority		11,395	22.91	▼0.07
BN hold		Swing		
Source(s) "His Majesty's Government Gazette - Notice of Contested Election, Parliament for the State of Pahang [P.U. (B) 238/2018]" (PDF). Attorney General's Chambers of Malaysia. 3 May 2018. "Federal Government Gazette - Results of Contested Election and Statements of the Poll after the Official Addition of Votes, Parliamentary Constituencies for the State of Pahang [P.U. (B) 312/2018]" (PDF). Attorney General's Chambers of Malaysia. 28 May 2018.

Malaysian general by-election, 5 May 2015 Upon the death of incumbent, Jamaluddin Jarjis
Party	Candidate	Votes	%	∆%
BN	Hasan Arifin	23,796	61.49	▼5.32
PAS	Nazri Ahmad	14,901	38.51	▲5.32
Total valid votes		38,697	100.00	
Total rejected ballots		591		
Unreturned ballots		64		
Turnout		39,352	73.84	▼12.01
Registered electors		53,294		
Majority		8,895	22.98	▼10.64
BN hold		Swing		
Source(s) "Pilihan Raya Kecil P.091 Rompin". Election Commission of Malaysia. "Federal Government Gazette - Notice of Contested Election - By-election of the Dewan Rakyat of P.091 Rompin for the State of Pahang [P.U. (B) 182/2015]" (PDF). Attorney General's Chambers of Malaysia. 22 April 2015. "P. U. (B) 220/2015 Federal Government Gazette - Results of Contested Election and Statement of the Poll after the Official Addition of Votes for the By-election of P.091 Rompin" (PDF). Attorney General's Chambers of Malaysia. 7 May 2015.

Malaysian general election, 2013
Party	Candidate	Votes	%	∆%
BN	Jamaluddin Jarjis	30,040	66.81	▲0.09
PAS	Nuridah Mohd Salleh	14,926	33.19	▼0.09
Total valid votes		44,966	100.00	
Total rejected ballots		883		
Unreturned ballots		165		
Turnout		46,014	85.85	▲6.88
Registered electors		53,596		
Majority		15,114	33.62	▲0.18
BN hold		Swing		
Source(s) "Federal Government Gazette - Notice of Contested Election, Parliament for the State of Pahang [P.U. (B) 175/2013]" (PDF). Attorney General's Chambers of Malaysia. 26 April 2013. "Federal Government Gazette - Results of Contested Election and Statements of the Poll after the Official Addition of Votes, Parliamentary Constituencies for the State of Pahang [P.U. (B) 216/2013]" (PDF). Attorney General's Chambers of Malaysia. 22 May 2013.

Malaysian general election, 2008
Party	Candidate	Votes	%	∆%
BN	Jamaluddin Jarjis	21,308	66.72	▲0.80
PAS	Mazlan Mohamed Yasin	10,629	33.28	▼0.80
Total valid votes		31,937	100.00	
Total rejected ballots		824		
Unreturned ballots		169		
Turnout		32,930	78.97	▲0.12
Registered electors		41,701		
Majority		10,679	33.44	▲1.60
BN hold		Swing		

Malaysian general election, 2004
Party	Candidate	Votes	%	∆%
BN	Jamaluddin Jarjis	19,359	65.92	▲4.23
PAS	Sukri Ahmad	10,009	34.08	▼4.23
Total valid votes		29,368	100.00	
Total rejected ballots		847		
Unreturned ballots		0		
Turnout		30,215	78.85	▲1.49
Registered electors		38,319		
Majority		9,350	31.84	▲8.46
BN hold		Swing		

Malaysian general election, 1999
Party	Candidate	Votes	%	∆%
BN	Jamaluddin Jarjis	15,907	61.69	▼14.77
PAS	Mazlan Mohamed Yasin	9,879	38.31	▲14.77
Total valid votes		25,786	100.00	
Total rejected ballots		598		
Unreturned ballots		170		
Turnout		26,554	77.36	▲0.81
Registered electors		34,325		
Majority		6,028	23.38	▼29.54
BN hold		Swing		

Malaysian general election, 1995
Party	Candidate	Votes	%	∆%
BN	Jamaluddin Jarjis	18,531	76.46	▲3.72
PAS	Yahya Awang	5,706	23.54	▼3.72
Total valid votes		24,237	100.00	
Total rejected ballots		1,004		
Unreturned ballots		72		
Turnout		25,313	76.55	▲1.77
Registered electors		33,067		
Majority		12,825	52.92	▲7.44
BN hold		Swing		

Malaysian general election, 1990
Party	Candidate	Votes	%	∆%
BN	Jamaluddin Jarjis	20,994	72.74	▼4.09
PAS	Salim @ Ahmad Awg. Kalib	7,866	27.26	▲4.09
Total valid votes		28,860	100.00	
Total rejected ballots		910		
Unreturned ballots		0		
Turnout		29,770	74.78	▲6.22
Registered electors		39,808		
Majority		13,128	45.48	▼8.18
BN hold		Swing		

Malaysian general election, 1986
Party	Candidate	Votes	%
BN	Mohamed Amin Daud	16,118	76.83
PAS	Yahya Awang	4,861	23.17
Total valid votes		20,979	100.00
Total rejected ballots		529	
Unreturned ballots		0	
Turnout		21,508	68.56
Registered electors		31,373	
Majority		11,257	53.66
This was a new constituency created.
