= Bukit Ibam (state constituency) =

Political subdivision in Malaysia

Bukit Ibam (N40)
Pahang constituency

State constituency
- Legislature: Pahang State Legislative Assembly
MLA
Nazri Ahmad
PN
- Constituency created: 1974
- First contested: 1974
- Last contested: 2022

Demographics
- Electors (2022): 31,003

Bukit Ibam is a state constituency in Pahang, Malaysia, that has been represented in the Pahang State Legislative Assembly.

== Demographics ==
Ethnic breakdown of Bukit Ibam's electorate as of 2022
1. Malay (85.8%)
2. Other ethnicities (12.9%)
3. Indian (0.99%)
4. Chinese (0.30%)

== History ==
=== Polling districts ===
According to the federal gazette issued on 31 October 2022, the Rompin constituency is divided into 38 polling districts.

State constituency	Polling district	Code	Location
Bukit Ibam（N40）	Bandar Bukit Ibam	091/40/01	SMA Bukit Ibam
Bukit Ibam（N40）	Kampung Aur	091/40/02	SK Kampung Aur; SK Buluh Nipis
Bukit Ibam（N40）	Kota Bahagia	091/40/03	SK Ladang Kota Bahagia
Bukit Ibam（N40）	Bukit Serok	091/40/04	SK Bukit Serok; SK Melati
Bukit Ibam（N40）	FELDA Keratong 2	091/40/05	SK LKTP Keratong 2
Bukit Ibam（N40）	FELDA Keratong 3	091/40/06	SK LKTP Keratong 3
Bukit Ibam（N40）	FELDA Keratong 5	091/40/07	SA Rakyat Al-Asriah FELDA Keratong 5
Bukit Ibam（N40）	FELDA Keratong 7	091/40/08	SK LKTP Keratong 7
Bukit Ibam（N40）	FELDA Keratong 4	091/40/09	SK LKTP Keratong 4
Bukit Ibam（N40）	FELDA Keratong 1	091/40/10	SK LKTP Keratong 1
Bukit Ibam（N40）	FELDA Selancar 1	091/40/11	SMK Selancar

=== Representation history ===
Members of the Legislative Assembly for Bukit Ibam
Assembly	No	Years	Name	Party
Constituency created from Rompin
4th	N27	1974-1978	Mohamed Rusdi Mohamed Ariff	BN (PAS)
5th	N27	1978-1982	Mohd Khalil Yaakob	BN (UMNO)
6th	N27	1982-1986	Abdul Jabbar Ibrahim	BN (UMNO)
7th	N32	1986-1990	Abdul Jabbar Ibrahim	BN (UMNO)
8th	N32	1990-1995	Hasan Arifin	BN (UMNO)
9th	N36	1995-1999	Hasan Arifin	BN (UMNO)
10th	N36	1999-2004	Hasan Arifin	BN (UMNO)
11th	N40	2004-2008	Mohamad Sahfri Ab Aziz	BN (UMNO)
12th	N40	2008-2013	Mohamad Sahfri Ab Aziz	BN (UMNO)
13th	N40	2013-2018	Wan Kadri Wan Mahusain	BN (UMNO)
14th	N40	2018-2022	Samsiah Arshad	BN (UMNO)
15th	N40	2022–present	Nazri Ahmad	PN (PAS)

== Election results ==
Pahang state election, 2022
Party	Candidate	Votes	%	∆%
PN	Nazri Ahmad	12,488	52.88	▲52.88
BN	Samsiah Arshad	10,032	42.48	▼8.47
PH	Barirah Mokhtar	1,096	4.64	▲4.64
Total valid votes		23,616	100.00	
Total rejected ballots		368		
Unreturned ballots		56		
Turnout		24,040	77.54	▼5.52
Registered electors		31,003		
Majority		2,456	10.40	▼2.96
PN gain from BN		Swing		?

Pahang state election, 2018
Party	Candidate	Votes	%	∆%
BN	Samsiah Arshad	9,448	50.95	▼14.77
PAS	Nazri Ahmad	6,970	37.59	▲4.73
PKR	Zulkurnain Mohamad Ridzuan	2,126	11.46	▲11.46
Total valid votes		18,544	100.00	
Total rejected ballots		310		
Unreturned ballots		90		
Turnout		18,944	83.07	▼3.16
Registered electors		22,806		
Majority		2,478	13.36	▼19.50
BN hold		Swing		

Pahang state election, 2013
Party	Candidate	Votes	%	∆%
BN	Wan Kadri Wan Mahusain	10,931	65.72	▲4.59
PAS	Sukri Ahmad	5,465	32.86	▼6.01
Independent	Ienan Kassim	236	1.42	▲1.42
Total valid votes		16,632	100.00	
Total rejected ballots		265		
Unreturned ballots		65		
Turnout		16,962	86.23	▲6.17
Registered electors		19,671		
Majority		5,466	32.86	▲10.60
BN hold		Swing		

Pahang state election, 2008
Party	Candidate	Votes	%	∆%
BN	Sahfri Ab Aziz	7,326	61.13	▼3.57
PAS	Sukri Ahmad	4,658	38.87	▲3.57
Total valid votes		11,984	100.00	
Total rejected ballots		309		
Unreturned ballots		115		
Turnout		12,408	80.06	▲1.61
Registered electors		15,499		
Majority		2,668	22.26	▼7.14
BN hold		Swing		

Pahang state election, 2004
Party	Candidate	Votes	%	∆%
BN	Sahfri Ab Aziz	6,980	64.70	▲1.26
PAS	Nasrudin Hassan Tantawi	3,808	35.30	▼1.26
Total valid votes		10,788	100.00	
Total rejected ballots		221		
Unreturned ballots		0		
Turnout		11,009	78.45	▼1.41
Registered electors		14,034		
Majority		3,172	29.40	▲2.52
BN hold		Swing		

Pahang state election, 1999
Party	Candidate	Votes	%	∆%
BN	Hasan Arifin	6,035	63.44	▼9.66
PAS	Sukri Ahmad	3,478	36.56	▲9.66
Total valid votes		9,513	100.00	
Total rejected ballots		265		
Unreturned ballots		130		
Turnout		9,908	79.85	▼0.36
Registered electors		12,408		
Majority		2,557	26.88	▼19.33
BN hold		Swing		

Pahang state election, 1995
Party	Candidate	Votes	%	∆%
BN	Hasan Arifin	6,762	73.10	▲2.70
PAS	Ismail Mat Tahar	2,488	26.90	▼2.70
Total valid votes		9,250	100.00	
Total rejected ballots		207		
Unreturned ballots		18		
Turnout		9,475	80.22	▲0.21
Registered electors		11,812		
Majority		4,274	46.21	▲5.41
BN hold		Swing		

Pahang state election, 1990
Party	Candidate	Votes	%	∆%
BN	Hasan Arifin	9,289	70.40	▼8.13
PAS	Othman Bakar	3,906	29.60	▲8.13
Total valid votes		13,195	100.00	
Total rejected ballots		434		
Unreturned ballots		4		
Turnout		13,633	80.01	▲6.65
Registered electors		17,040		
Majority		5,383	40.80	▼16.26
BN hold		Swing		

Pahang state election, 1986
Party	Candidate	Votes	%	∆%
BN	Abdul Jabbar Ibrahim	6,967	78.53	▲4.41
PAS	Muhamad Noor Abdul Latif	1,905	21.47	▼4.41
Total valid votes		8,872	100.00	
Total rejected ballots		346		
Unreturned ballots		0		
Turnout		9,218	73.36	▲3.12
Registered electors		12,566		
Majority		5,062	57.06	▲8.82
BN hold		Swing		

Pahang state election, 1982
Party	Candidate	Votes	%	∆%
BN	Abdul Jabbar Ibrahim	5,761	74.12	▼5.12
PAS	Mohd. Mokhtar Abdullah	2,012	25.88	▲5.12
Total valid votes		7,773	100.00	
Total rejected ballots		249		
Unreturned ballots		0		
Turnout		8,022	70.24	▲10.00
Registered electors		11,421		
Majority		3,749	48.23	▼10.24
BN hold		Swing		

Pahang state election, 1978
Party	Candidate	Votes	%	∆%
BN	Mohamed Khalil Yaakob	2,015	79.24	▲79.24
PAS	Abdullah Jaafar	528	20.76	▼58.85
Total valid votes		2,543	100.00	
Total rejected ballots		245		
Unreturned ballots		0		
Turnout		2,788	60.24	▼0.23
Registered electors		4,628		
Majority		1,487	58.47	▼0.76
BN hold		Swing		

Pahang state election, 1974
Party	Candidate	Votes	%
BN	Mohamed Rusdi Arif	1,742	79.62
Parti Rakyat Malaysia	Mahmud Mohd. Salleh	446	20.38
Total valid votes		2,188	100.00
Total rejected ballots		101	
Unreturned ballots		0	
Turnout		2,289	60.48
Registered electors		3,785	
Majority		1,296	59.23
This was a new constituency created.
