= Betong (federal constituency) =

Federal constituency of Sarawak, Malaysia

Betong (P204)
Sarawak constituency

Federal constituency
- Legislature: Dewan Rakyat
- MP: Richard Rapu; GPS
- Constituency created: 1968
- First contested: 1969
- Last contested: 2022

Demographics
- Population (2020): 34,630
- Electors (2022): 41,743
- Area (km²): 1,398
- Pop. density (per km²): 24.8

Betong is a federal constituency in Betong Division (Betong District), Sarawak, Malaysia, that has been represented in the Dewan Rakyat since 1971.

The federal constituency was created in the 1968 redistribution and is mandated to return a single member to the Dewan Rakyat under the first past the post voting system.

== Demographics ==
Ethnic breakdown of Betong's electorate as of 2022
1. Sarawak Bumiputera (49.0%)
2. Malay-Muslim Bumiputera (44.3%)
3. Chinese (6.30%)
4. Other ethnicities (0.40%)

As of 2020, Betong has a population of 34,630 people.

Age breakdown of Betong's electorate as of 2022
1. 18–20 (6.22%)
2. 21–29 (20.5%)
3. 30–39 (21.5%)
4. 40–49 (16.0%)
5. 50–59 (16.2%)
6. 60–69 (11.4%)
7. 70–79 (5.81%)
8. 80–89 (1.84%)
9. above 90 (0.43%)
Gender breakdown of Betong's electorate as of 2022
1. Male (50.2%)
2. Female (49.9%)

== History ==
=== Polling districts ===
According to the gazette issued on 31 October 2022, the Betong constituency has a total of 84 polling districts.

State constituency	Polling Districts	Code	Location
Saribas (N35)	Manggut	204/35/01	SK Manggut
Saribas (N35)	Tui	204/35/02	SK Tui
Saribas (N35)	Debak	204/35/03	SJK (C) Chung Hua Debak
Saribas (N35)	Bungin	204/35/04	SK Bungin
Saribas (N35)	Likis	204/35/05	SK St. Christopher Debak
Saribas (N35)	Supa	204/35/06	SK Supa
Saribas (N35)	Engkaras	204/35/07	SK Medang
Saribas (N35)	Buda	204/35/08	SK Buda
Saribas (N35)	Serabang	204/35/09	SK Serabang
Saribas (N35)	Belasu	204/35/10	SK St. Barnabas Belasau
Saribas (N35)	Sabar	204/35/11	RH Inchok Sabar
Saribas (N35)	Dit	204/35/12	SK Dit
Saribas (N35)	Dit Hulu	204/35/13	RH Jimbat Dit Ulu
Saribas (N35)	Bungei	204/35/14	SK Datuk Bandar Debak
Saribas (N35)	Jerai	204/35/15	RH Stephen Lambor Jerai
Saribas (N35)	Debak Laut	204/35/16	Dewan JKKK Kpg. Debak Laut
Saribas (N35)	Serembang	204/35/17	SK Serembang
Saribas (N35)	Tanjong Assam	205/35/18	SK Tanjung Assam
Saribas (N35)	Sebemban	204/35/19	SK Sebemban
Saribas (N35)	Belingan	204/35/20	SK Balingan
Saribas (N35)	Budak	204/35/21	RH James Tujuh Ak Panggau Budak Ili
Layar (N36)	Spak	204/36/01	SK Ng. Spak
Layar (N36)	Padeh	204/36/02	SK St. Bartholomew Ng. Grahu
Layar (N36)	Bebanggai	204/36/03	RH Stani Bebanggai Kanan
Layar (N36)	Betong	204/36/04	SJK (C) Chung Hua Betong
Layar (N36)	Kampung Betong	204/36/05	SK Abang Abdul Kadir
Layar (N36)	Lubau	204/36/06	RH Uking Batu Lintang
Layar (N36)	Penyalaneh	204/36/07	SK St. Mark Batu Genting
Layar (N36)	Jelau	204/36/08	RH Jawa Ng. Jelau; RH Gumbang Jelau Atas
Layar (N36)	Melanjan	204/36/09	RH Rokayah Melanjan
Layar (N36)	Tapeh	204/36/10	RH Gawan Ng Tappeh
Layar (N36)	Luing	204/36/11	SK Ng. Lawih / Lesu
Layar (N36)	Krapa	204/36/12	RH Jambai Kerapa
Layar (N36)	Teguyu	204/36/13	RH Naing Teguyu
Layar (N36)	Perdu	204/36/14	RH Brundie Batu Pesok
Layar (N36)	Dabok	204/36/15	SK Ng. Ajau
Layar (N36)	Gawis	204/36/16	SK St. Peter / St. Paul Ng. Buai
Layar (N36)	Balingam	204/36/17	RH Sang Sg. Sibau; RH John Ragai Buai Melanjan
Layar (N36)	Kron	204/36/18	RH Achong Kron
Layar (N36)	Plepok	204/36/19	RH Pagah Peleok; RH Empeni Bungkang
Layar (N36)	Merunjau	204/36/20	RH Uyok Merunjau
Layar (N36)	Entanak	204/36/21	RH Randi Entanak
Layar (N36)	Saka	204/36/22	SK Saka
Layar (N36)	Penurin	204/36/23	RH Sibat Penurin
Layar (N36)	Tanu	204/36/24	RH Teddy Lepoh Jungkal
Layar (N36)	Jugir	204/36/25	Dewan Tan Sri Jabu SMK St. Augustin Betong
Layar (N36)	Pasa	204/36/26	SK Ng. Pasa
Layar (N36)	Selulap	204/36/27	RH Spell Selulap
Layar (N36)	Stambak	204/36/28	RH Patrick Benjamin Stambak Ulu
Bukit Saban（N37）	Penunus	204/37/01	RH Pau Penunus
Bukit Saban（N37）	Rimbas	204/37/02	RH Benjamin, Ulu Rimbas
Bukit Saban（N37）	Spaoh	204/37/03	SJK (C) Chung Hua Spaoh
Bukit Saban（N37）	Suri	204/37/04	SK Suri
Bukit Saban（N37）	Bukit Saban	204/37/05	RH Kelvin Bundak Tanjong Baru; RH James Jugol Belabak
Bukit Saban（N37）	Kubal	204/37/06	RH Janggat Sg. Langit
Bukit Saban（N37）	Brutan	204/37/07	RH Lawrence Luban Ulu
Bukit Saban（N37）	Bayor	204/37/08	RH Jimmy Ulu Bayor
Bukit Saban（N37）	Ulu Teru	204/37/09	RH Ganya Ulu Teru
Bukit Saban（N37）	Metong	204/37/10	RN Denil Menyalin Baru
Bukit Saban（N37）	Delit	204/37/11	SK Ng. Gayau
Bukit Saban（N37）	Babu	204/37/12	RH Danggat Babu Tengah; RH Lidi Busuk Babu Ulu
Bukit Saban（N37）	Traie	204/37/13	RH Basil Melaka Traie
Bukit Saban（N37）	Rapong	204/37/14	RH Bawir Rapong
Bukit Saban（N37）	Tot	204/37/15	RH Rayong Ng. Lop
Bukit Saban（N37）	Spaoh Hulu	204/37/16	SMK Spaoh
Bukit Saban（N37）	Spaoh Hilir	204/37/17	SK Spaoh
Bukit Saban（N37）	Belabak	204/37/18	RH Judin Udau
Bukit Saban（N37）	Lingit	204/37/19	RH Evelyn Inja Lempaong
Bukit Saban（N37）	Penom	204/37/20	RH Mendit Penom
Bukit Saban（N37）	Meroh	204/37/21	RH Jame Lubok Klampu
Bukit Saban（N37）	Sepuna	204/37/22	RH Luta Empaga Ng Bong
Bukit Saban（N37）	Samu	204/37/23	RH Enterie Samu
Bukit Saban（N37）	Mutok	204/37/24	RH Masing Mutok
Bukit Saban（N37）	Penebak	204/37/25	SK St. John Ng. Tuga
Bukit Saban（N37）	Bair	204/37/26	RH Banyang Bair
Bukit Saban（N37）	Jambu	204/37/27	RH Joseph Sanda
Bukit Saban（N37）	Tiput	204/37/28	RH Kedit Raba Tiput
Bukit Saban（N37）	Pelikoi	204/37/29	RH Thomas Pelikoi
Bukit Saban（N37）	Jaloh	204/37/30	RH Kechendai Jaloh
Bukit Saban（N37）	Serudit	204/37/31	RH Reselie Ujie Serudit
Bukit Saban（N37）	Matop	204/37/32	RH Anyi Matop
Bukit Saban（N37）	Teberu	204/37/33	SK Paku Central
Bukit Saban（N37）	Rembai	204/37/34	RH Nyanggau Chong Bangkit Rembai Baru
Bukit Saban（N37）	Bangkit	204/37/35	RH Munan Ng Bangkit

=== Representation history ===
Members of Parliament for Betong
Parliament	No	Years	Member	Party	Vote Share
Constituency created
		1969–1971	Parliament was suspended		
3rd	P130	1971–1974	Andrew Mara Walter Unjah	SNAP	3,816; 43.00%
4th	P140	1974–1978	Wairy Leben Kato	BN (PBB)	6,211; 57.46%
5th	P140	1978–1982	Wairy Leben Kato	BN (PBB)	6,473; 64.70%
6th	P140	1982–1986	Alfred Jabu Numpang	BN (PBB)	6,178; 56.80%
7th	P163	1986–1990	Douglas Uggah Embas	BN (PBB)	8,052; 65.65%
8th	P165	1990–1995	Douglas Uggah Embas	BN (PBB)	9,178; 75.29%
9th	P177	1995–1999	Douglas Uggah Embas	BN (PBB)	Uncontested
10th	P178	1999–2004	Douglas Uggah Embas	BN (PBB)	Uncontested
11th	P204	2004–2008	Douglas Uggah Embas	BN (PBB)	11,618; 85.98%
12th	P204	2008–2013	Douglas Uggah Embas	BN (PBB)	13,708; 87.27%
13th	P204	2013–2018	Douglas Uggah Embas	BN (PBB)	15,476; 77.13%
14th	P204	2018	Robert Lawson Chuat Vincent Entering	BN (PBB)	12,517; 60.41%
14th	P204	2018–2022	Robert Lawson Chuat Vincent Entering	GPS (PBB)	12,517; 60.41%
15th	P204	2022–present	Richard Rapu	GPS (PBB)	16,479; 61.69%

=== State constituency ===
Parliamentary constituency	State constituency					
Parliamentary constituency	1969–1978	1978–1990	1990–1999	1999–2008	2008–2016	2016–present
Betong					Bukit Saban	
Betong	Layar					
Betong	Saribas					

=== Historical boundaries ===
Parliamentary constituency	Area					
Parliamentary constituency	1968	1977	1987	1996	2005	2015
Bukit Saban					Bukit Saban; Matop; Nanga Tebalau; Paku; Spaoh	
Layar	Betong; Engkeranji; Jangkar; Matop; Spaoh		Betong; Engkeranji; Jangkar; Matop; Paku		Betong; Engkeranji; Entanak; Jangkar; Layar	
Saribas	Beladin; Debak; Kampung Semarang; Pusa; Saribas		Belok; Bungin; Debak; Seruai; Spaoh		Debak; Kampung Manggut; Saribas; Serembang; Tanjung Assam	

=== Current state assembly members ===
No.	State Constituency	Member	Coalition (Party)
N35	Saribas	Ricky Sitam	GPS (PBB)
N36	Layar	Gerald Rentap Jabu	GPS (PBB)
N37	Bukit Saban	Douglas Uggah Embas	GPS (PBB)

=== Local governments & postcodes ===
No.	State Constituency	Local Government	Postcode
N35	Saribas	Betong District Council	95500 Debak; 95600 Spaoh; 95700 Betong
N36	Layar	Betong District Council	95500 Debak; 95600 Spaoh; 95700 Betong
N37	Bukit Saban	Betong District Council	95500 Debak; 95600 Spaoh; 95700 Betong

== Election results ==
Malaysian general election, 2022
Party	Candidate	Votes	%	∆%
GPS	Richard Rapu	16,479	61.69	▲61.69
PH	Patrick Kamis	5,177	19.38	▲19.38
Independent	Hasbie Satar	5,057	18.93	▲18.93
Total valid votes		26,713	100.00	
Total rejected ballots		428		
Unreturned ballots		98		
Turnout		27,239	63.99	▲8.63
Registered electors		41,743		
Majority		11,302	42.31	▲3.14
GPS gain from BN		Swing		?
Source(s) https://lom.agc.gov.my/ilims/upload/portal/akta/outputp/1753265/PARLIMEN%20SARAWAK%20(PUB%20620).pdf

Malaysian general election, 2018
Party	Candidate	Votes	%	∆%
BN	Robert Lawson Chuat Vincent Entering	12,517	60.41	▼16.72
Independent	Abang Ahmad Abang Suni	4,401	21.24	▲21.24
PKR	Noel Changgai Bucking	3,802	18.35	▼4.52
Total valid votes		20,720	100.00	
Total rejected ballots		283		
Unreturned ballots		162		
Turnout		21,165	72.62	▼5.03
Registered electors		29,145		
Majority		8,116	39.17	▼15.09
BN hold		Swing		
Source(s) "His Majesty's Government Gazette – Notice of Contested Election, Parliament for the State of Sarawak [P.U. (B) 247/2018]" (PDF). Attorney General's Chambers of Malaysia. 3 May 2018. "Federal Government Gazette – Results of Contested Election and Statements of the Poll after the Official Addition of Votes, Parliamentary Constituencies for the State of Sarawak [P.U. (B) 321/2018]" (PDF). Attorney General's Chambers of Malaysia. 28 May 2018. Archived from the original (PDF) on 29 December 2019.

Malaysian general election, 2013
Party	Candidate	Votes	%	∆%
BN	Douglas Uggah Embas	15,476	77.13	▼10.14
PKR	Cecilia Siti Una	4,589	22.87	▲22.87
Total valid votes		20,065	100.00	
Total rejected ballots		315		
Unreturned ballots		59		
Turnout		20,439	77.65	▲5.43
Registered electors		26,322		
Majority		10,887	54.26	▼20.28
BN hold		Swing		
Source(s) "Federal Government Gazette – Notice of Contested Election, Parliament for the State of Sarawak [P.U. (B) 184/2013]" (PDF). Attorney General's Chambers of Malaysia. 26 April 2013. Archived from the original (PDF) on 30 September 2018. "Federal Government Gazette – Results of Contested Election and Statements of the Poll after the Official Addition of Votes, Parliamentary Constituencies for the State of Sarawak [P.U. (B) 225/2013]" (PDF). Attorney General's Chambers of Malaysia. 22 May 2013. Archived from the original (PDF) on 30 September 2018.

Malaysian general election, 2008
Party	Candidate	Votes	%	∆%
BN	Douglas Uggah Embas	13,708	87.27	▲1.29
SNAP	Edmund Stanley Jugol Benedict Sandin	1,999	12.73	▼1.29
Total valid votes		15,707	100.00	
Total rejected ballots		246		
Unreturned ballots		0		
Turnout		15,953	72.22	▲6.21
Registered electors		22,088		
Majority		11,709	74.54	▲2.58
BN hold		Swing		

Malaysian general election, 2004
Party	Candidate	Votes	%	∆%
BN	Douglas Uggah Embas	11,618	85.98	▲85.98
SNAP	Abang Zulkifli Abang Engkeh	1,895	14.02	▲14.02
Total valid votes		13,513	100.00	
Total rejected ballots		176		
Unreturned ballots		0		
Turnout		13,689	66.01	
Registered electors		20,737		
Majority		9,723	71.96	
BN hold		Swing		

Malaysian general election, 1999
Party	Candidate	Votes	%	∆%
On the nomination day, Douglas Uggah Embas won uncontested.
BN	Douglas Uggah Embas			
Total valid votes			100.00	
Total rejected ballots				
Unreturned ballots				
Turnout				
Registered electors		19,885		
Majority				
BN hold		Swing		

Elector Count is from Tindak Malaysia's GitHub

Malaysian general election, 1995
Party	Candidate	Votes	%	∆%
On the nomination day, Douglas Uggah Embas won uncontested.
BN	Douglas Uggah Embas			
Total valid votes			100.00	
Total rejected ballots				
Unreturned ballots				
Turnout				
Registered electors		20,006		
Majority				
BN hold		Swing		

Elector count is from Tindak Malaysia's GitHub

Malaysian general election, 1990
Party	Candidate	Votes	%	∆%
BN	Douglas Uggah Embas	9,178	75.29	▲9.64
PERMAS	Musa Jamaluddin	2,005	16.45	▲16.45
Independent	David Impi	1,007	8.26	▲8.26
Total valid votes		12,190	100.00	
Total rejected ballots		155		
Unreturned ballots		0		
Turnout		12,345	69.75	▲8.29
Registered electors		17,700		
Majority		7,173	58.84	▲13.03
BN hold		Swing		

Malaysian general election, 1986
Party	Candidate	Votes	%	∆%
BN	Douglas Uggah Embas	8,052	65.65	▲8.85
Independent	Wilfred Gomez Azarias Malong	2,433	19.84	▲19.84
Independent	George Dennis Ningkan	1,780	14.51	▲14.51
Total valid votes		12,265	100.00	
Total rejected ballots		249		
Unreturned ballots		0		
Turnout		12,514	61.46	▼1.48
Registered electors		20,361		
Majority		5,619	45.81	▲32.21
BN hold		Swing		

Malaysian general election, 1982
Party	Candidate	Votes	%	∆%
BN	Alfred Jabu Numpang	6,178	56.80	▼7.90
Independent	David Kalom Umpie	4,698	43.20	▲43.20
Total valid votes		10,876	100.00	
Total rejected ballots		371		
Unreturned ballots		0		
Turnout		11,247	62.94	▼1.68
Registered electors		17,870		
Majority		1,480	13.60	▼20.14
BN hold		Swing		

Malaysian general election, 1978
Party	Candidate	Votes	%	∆%
BN	Wairy Leben Kato	6,473	64.70	▲7.24
Parti Anak Jati Sarawak	Charles Henry Ingka	3,098	30.96	▲30.96
PNRS	Mahmood Aman	434	4.34	▲4.34
Total valid votes		10,005	100.00	
Total rejected ballots		375		
Unreturned ballots		0		
Turnout		10,380	64.62	▼15.23
Registered electors		16,064		
Majority		3,375	33.74	▲18.82
BN hold		Swing		

Malaysian general election, 1974
Party	Candidate	Votes	%	∆%
BN	Wairy Leben Kato	6,211	57.46	▲57.46
SNAP	Stephen Kalong Ningkan	4,598	42.54	▼0.46
Total valid votes		10,809	100.00	
Total rejected ballots		526		
Unreturned ballots		0		
Turnout		11,465	79.85	▲6.40
Registered electors		14,348		
Majority		1,613	14.92	▼0.58
BN gain from SNAP		Swing		?

Malaysian general election, 1969
Party	Candidate	Votes	%
SNAP	Andrew Mara Walter Unjah	3,816	43.00
PBB	Abang Hood Abang Suhaimi	2,441	27.50
PESAKA	Langgi Jilap	1,611	18.15
Independent	Umpang Pelima	1,007	11.35
Total valid votes		8,875	100.00
Total rejected ballots		741	
Unreturned ballots			
Turnout		9,616	73.45
Registered electors		13,092	
Majority		1,375	15.50
This was a new constituency created.
