= Robert Lawson Chuat Vincent Entering =

Malaysian politician

Yang Berbahagia Datuk Robert Lawson Chuat PGBK KMN

Chairman of the Bintulu Port Authority
- In office 28 April 2020 – 30 November 2023
- Minister: Wee Ka Siong (2020–2022); Anthony Loke (2022–2023)
- General Manager: Zulkurnain Ayub
- Preceded by: John Brian Anthony
- Succeeded by: Mohamad Abu Bakar Marzuki

Member of the Malaysian Parliament for Betong
- In office 9 May 2018 – 19 November 2022
- Preceded by: Douglas Uggah Embas (BN–PBB)
- Succeeded by: Richard Rapu (GPS–PBB)
- Majority: 8,116 (2018)

Member of the Sarawak State Legislative Assembly for Bukit Saban
- In office 20 May 2006 – 7 May 2016
- Preceded by: Position established
- Succeeded by: Douglas Uggah Embas (BN–PBB)
- Majority: 1,838 (2006); 2,774 (2011)

Personal details
- Born: Robert Lawson Chuat anak Vincent Entering; 14 June 1958 (age 68) Ulu Paku, Spaoh, Betong, Crown Colony of Sarawak (now Sarawak, Malaysia)
- Party: Parti Pesaka Bumiputera Bersatu (PBB) (2006–present)
- Other political affiliations: Barisan Nasional (BN) (2006–2018); Sarawak Parties Alliance (GPS) (2018–present)
- Spouse: Claudia Regina Janting
- Children: 5
- Education: Brighton Polytechnic

Datuk Robert Lawson Chuat anak Vincent Entering (born 14 June 1958) is a Malaysian politician who served as the Member of Parliament (MP) for Betong from May 2018 to November 2022 and Chairman of the Bintulu Port Authority (BPA) from April 2020 until November 2023. He served as Member of the Sarawak State Legislative Assembly (MLA) for Bukit Saban from May 2006 to May 2016. He is a member of the Parti Pesaka Bumiputera Bersatu (PBB), a component party of the ruling Gabungan Parti Sarawak (GPS) coalition and formerly ruling Barisan Nasional (BN) coalition.

== Political career ==
Robert was first elected as a Member of the Sarawak State Legislative Assembly (MLA) in 2006 after contesting for and winning in the 9th Sarawak state elections for Bukit Saban constituency. In 2011, he successfully defended the same seat in the following 10th Sarawak state elections with an increased majority. Following his win, he was appointed as Sarawak's Assistant Minister of Welfare, Women and Family Development.

After serving two terms as MLA for Bukit Saban, he yielded his seat to allow Deputy Chief Minister I of Sarawak, Douglas Uggah Embas to contest instead. Consequently, Robert was fielded as PBB's candidate to contest for Douglas' parliamentary seat of Betong in the 14th Malaysian general election.

== Education ==
Robert completed his early education in his hometown of Betong, Sarawak and holds a Diploma in Business Studies from the Brighton Polytechnic, United Kingdom.

== Personal life ==
Robert is a nephew to former Deputy Chief Minister II of Sarawak Alfred Jabu Numpang and married to Claudia Regina Janting.

Robert is a director of 'Durafarm' and among the major shareholders of a 'KACC Construction Sdn. Bhd.', alongside Bustari Yusof, the brother of former Minister of Works of Malaysia, Fadillah Yusof, a company which has been repeatedly being accused of allegedly siphoning public funds and receiving an unusually large amount of multimillion government projects.

== Election results ==
Sarawak State Legislative Assembly
Year	Constituency	Candidate	Votes	Pct	Opponent(s)	Votes	Pct	Ballots cast	Majority	Turnout
2006	N37 Bukit Saban	Robert Lawson Chuat Vincent Entering (PBB)	3,258	69.65%	Edwin Dundang Bugak (SNAP)	1,420	30.35%	4,761	1,838	69.24%
2011	N37 Bukit Saban	Robert Lawson Chuat Vincent Entering (PBB)	3,899	68.83%	Jerah Engkiong @ Edward Jerah (PKR)	1,125	19.86%	5,761	2,774	75.24%
2011	N37 Bukit Saban	Robert Lawson Chuat Vincent Entering (PBB)	3,899	68.83%	Dayrell Walter Entrie (SNAP)	641	11.32%	5,761	2,774	75.24%

Parliament of Malaysia
Year	Constituency	Candidate	Votes	Pct	Opponent(s)	Votes	Pct	Ballots cast	Majority	Turnout
2018	P204 Betong, Sarawak	Robert Lawson Chuat Vincent Entering (PBB)	12,517	60.41%	Abang Ahmad Abang Suni (IND)	4,401	21.24%	21,165	8,116	72.62%
2018	P204 Betong, Sarawak	Robert Lawson Chuat Vincent Entering (PBB)	12,517	60.41%	Noel Changgai Bucking (PKR)	3,802	18.35%	21,165	8,116	72.62%

== Honours ==
- Malaysia
  - Officer of the Order of the Defender of the Realm (KMN) (2008)
- Sarawak
  - Commander of the Order of the Star of Hornbill Sarawak (PGBK) – Datuk (2018)

== See also ==
- Betong (federal constituency)
- Bukit Saban (state constituency)
