= Selayang (federal constituency) =

Federal constituency of Selangor, Malaysia

Selayang (P097)
Selangor constituency

Federal constituency
- Legislature: Dewan Rakyat
- MP: William Leong Jee Keen; PH
- Constituency created: 1974
- First contested: 1974
- Last contested: 2022

Demographics
- Population (2020): 363,289
- Electors (2023): 185,425
- Area (km²): 285
- Pop. density (per km²): 1,274.7

Selayang is a federal constituency in Gombak District, Selangor, Malaysia, that has been represented in the Dewan Rakyat since 1974.

The federal constituency was created in the 1974 redistribution and is mandated to return a single member to the Dewan Rakyat under the first past the post voting system.

== Demographics ==
Ethnic breakdown of Selayang's electorate as of 2018
1. Malay (51.8%)
2. Chinese (26.2%)
3. Indian (17.8%)
4. Other ethnicities (4.20%)
Age breakdown of Selayang's electorate as of 2022
1. 18-20 (8.34%)
2. 21-29 (25.3%)
3. 30-39 (21.1%)
4. 40-49 (16.4%)
5. 50-59 (14.4%)
6. 60-69 (9.52%)
7. 70-79 (3.67%)
8. 80-89 (1.02%)
9. above 90 (0.19%)
Gender breakdown of Selayang's electorate as of 2022
1. Male (49.6%)
2. Female (50.4%)

== History ==
=== Polling districts ===
According to the federal gazette issued on 18 July 2023, the Selayang constituency is divided into 43 polling districts.

| State constituency | Polling Districts | Code | Location |
|---|---|---|---|
| Kuang (N13) | Pengkalan Kundang | 097/13/01 | SJK (C) Kundang |
| Kuang (N13) | Sungai Serai | 097/13/02 | SK Sungai Serai Kuang |
| Kuang (N13) | Pekan Kuang | 097/13/03 | SJK (T) Kuang |
| Kuang (N13) | Kampung Gombak | 097/13/04 | SRA Kuang Batu 18 ¾ |
| Kuang (N13) | Kampung Kuang | 097/13/05 | SK Kuang |
| Kuang (N13) | Kampung Cempedak | 097/13/06 | SA Rakyat Al Manarah |
| Kuang (N13) | Sri Kundang | 097/13/07 | SK Seri Kundang |
| Kuang (N13) | Bandar Tasik Puteri | 097/13/08 | SMK Bandar Tasik Puteri; SK Bandar Tasik Puteri 2; SK Bandar Tasik Puteri |
| Kuang (N13) | Penjara Sungai Buloh | 097/13/09 | Dewan Majlis Perbandaran Kuala Selangor Desa Coalfields |
| Rawang (N14) | Bandar Country Home 1 | 097/14/01 | SK Taman Desa Bandar Country Homes |
| Rawang (N14) | Kuala Garing | 097/14/02 | SJK (T) Rawang |
| Rawang (N14) | Kampung Rajah | 097/14/03 | SMK Seri Garing Rawang |
| Rawang (N14) | Rawang | 097/14/04 | SK Rawang |
| Rawang (N14) | Kampung Melayu | 097/14/05 | Pejabat / Bilik Gerakan JKKK Kampung Lim Tan |
| Rawang (N14) | Kampung Kenanga | 097/14/06 | SRA Ibnu Khaldun Rawang |
| Rawang (N14) | Kampung Baharu Rawang | 097/14/07 | SJK (C) San Yuk Rawang |
| Rawang (N14) | Taman Sri Hijau | 097/14/08 | SK Bukit Rawang Jaya |
| Rawang (N14) | Kanching | 097/14/09 | SMA Rawang |
| Rawang (N14) | Taman Bersatu | 097/14/10 | SK Taman Tun Teja |
| Rawang (N14) | Taman Bukit Rawang | 097/14/11 | SK Bukit Rawang Jaya |
| Rawang (N14) | Kampung Tanjung | 097/14/12 | Pejabat / Bilik Gerakan JKKK Kampung Tanjung |
| Rawang (N14) | Bandar Country Home 2 | 097/14/13 | SMK Taman Desa Bandar Country Homes |
| Rawang (N14) | Kota Emerald East & West | 097/14/14 | SK Taman Desa (2) |
| Rawang (N14) | Garing Jaya | 097/14/15 | SJK (C) Kota Emerald |
| Rawang (N14) | Batu Arang Barat | 097/14/16 | SK Batu Arang |
| Rawang (N14) | Batu Arang Timur | 097/14/17 | SJK (C) Chap Kuan |
| Rawang (N14) | Batu Arang Selatan | 097/14/18 | SMK Tuaku Abdul Rahman |
| Taman Templer (N15) | Batu 16 Rawang | 097/15/01 | SMK Rawang Semekar |
| Taman Templer (N15) | Bandar Baru Selayang Utara | 097/15/02 | SK Bandar Baru Selayang |
| Taman Templer (N15) | Bukit Idaman | 097/15/03 | SMK Ideal Heights |
| Taman Templer (N15) | Selayang Baharu Tiga | 097/15/04 | SK Selayang Baru (1) |
| Taman Templer (N15) | Selayang Baharu Dua | 097/15/05 | SK Selayang Baru Dua |
| Taman Templer (N15) | Selayang Baharu Satu | 097/15/06 | SJK (C) Selayang Baru |
| Taman Templer (N15) | Taman Selayang Baharu | 097/15/07 | SRA Selayang Baru |
| Taman Templer (N15) | Selayang Pandang | 097/15/08 | SA Rakyat Umm Quarra' Selayang Pandang |
| Taman Templer (N15) | Sri Melati | 097/15/09 | SK Taman Prima Selayang |
| Taman Templer (N15) | Bandar Baru Selayang Selatan | 097/15/10 | SK Bandar Baru Selayang 2 |
| Taman Templer (N15) | Kampung Bendahara | 097/15/11 | Dewan Seroja Kampung Bendahara Selayang; Tabika Kemas Kampung Bendahara; Kawasan Rukun Tetangga Bandar Baru Selayang Fasa 2B |
| Taman Templer (N15) | Lembah Mutiara | 097/15/12 | Dewan Sri Siantan Kompleks Sukan Seri Siantan Majlis Perbandaran Selayang |
| Taman Templer (N15) | Kampung Selayang Permai | 097/15/13 | SRA Nurul Iman Selayang Baru |
| Taman Templer (N15) | Kampung Selayang Indah | 097/15/14 | Sekolah KAFA Integrasi Darul Ulum |
| Taman Templer (N15) | Taman Selayang Indah | 097/15/15 | SA Rakyat Al-Falah |
| Taman Templer (N15) | Prima Selayang | 097/15/16 | SK Taman Prima Selayang |

=== Representation history ===
Members of Parliament for Selayang
| Parliament | No | Years | Member | Party | Vote Share |
Constituency created from Rawang, Batu and Setapak
| 4th | P077 | 1974–1975 | Walter Loh Poh Khan (罗保根) | BN (MCA) | 16,779; 58.27% |
| 4th | P077 | 1975–1978 | Rosemary Chow Poh Kheng (周宝琼) | BN (MCA) | 19,338; 70.96% |
| 5th | P077 | 1978–1982 | Rafidah Aziz (رفيدة عزيز) | BN (UMNO) | 38,627; 66.65% |
| 6th | P077 | 1982–1986 | Rahmah Othman (رحمة عثمان) | BN (UMNO) | 51,353; 66.80% |
| 7th | P087 | 1986–1990 | Zaleha Ismail (صالحة إسماعيل) | BN (UMNO) | 40,681; 81.54% |
| 8th | P087 | 1990–1995 | Zaleha Ismail (صالحة إسماعيل) | BN (UMNO) | 51,062; 71.94% |
| 9th | P090 | 1995–1999 | Chan Kong Choy (陈广才) | BN (MCA) | 45,392; 87.03% |
| 10th | P090 | 1999–2004 | Chan Kong Choy (陈广才) | BN (MCA) | 34,979; 57.23% |
| 11th | P097 | 2004–2008 | Chan Kong Choy (陈广才) | BN (MCA) | 36,343; 73.48% |
| 12th | P097 | 2008–2013 | William Leong Jee Keen (梁自坚) | PR (PKR) | 30,701; 51.89% |
| 13th | P097 | 2013–2015 | William Leong Jee Keen (梁自坚) | PR (PKR) | 52,343; 57.60% |
| 13th | P097 | 2015–2018 | William Leong Jee Keen (梁自坚) | PH (PKR) | 52,343; 57.60% |
| 14th | P097 | 2018–2022 | William Leong Jee Keen (梁自坚) | PH (PKR) | 60,158; 61.38% |
| 15th | P097 | 2022–present | William Leong Jee Keen (梁自坚) | PH (PKR) | 72,773; 50.23% |

=== State constituency ===
| Parliamentary constituency | State constituency | | | | | | |
| Parliamentary constituency | 1955–59* | 1959–1974 | 1974–1986 | 1986–1995 | 1995–2004 | 2004–2018 | 2018–present |
|---|---|---|---|---|---|---|---|
| Selayang | | | Ampang | | | | |
| Selayang | | | Gombak | | | | |
| Selayang | | | | Gombak Setia | | | |
| Selayang | | | | | | Kuang | |
| Selayang | | | | Paya Jaras | | | |
| Selayang | | | Rawang | | | | |
| Selayang | | | | | Selayang Baharu | | |
| Selayang | | | | | | Taman Templer | |

=== Historical boundaries ===
| State Constituency | Area | | | | |
| State Constituency | 1974 | 1984 | 1994 | 2003 | 2018 |
|---|---|---|---|---|---|
| Ampang | Ampang Jaya; Gombak; Hulu Kelang; Pandan; Sungai Pusu | | | | |
| Gombak | Batu Caves; Kampung Selamat; Paya Jaras; Selayang; Sungai Buloh | | | | |
| Gombak Setia | | Batu Caves; Gombak Setia; Sri Gombak; Sungai Pusu; Taman Greenwood | | | |
| Kuang | | | | Bandar Tasik Puteri; Batu Arang; Kampung Sungai Serai; Kuang; Kundang | Bandar Tasik Puteri; Hulu Kuang; Kampung Sungai Serai; Kuang; Kundang |
| Paya Jaras | | Kampung Selamat; Paya Jaras; Selayang; Sungai Buloh; Taman Ehsan | Kuang; Paya Jaras; Subang Bestari; Sungai Buloh; Taman Ehsan | | |
| Rawang | Batu Arang; Kuang; Kundang; Rawang; Taman Templer | | Batu Arang; Kampung Kenaga; Kota Emerald; Kundang; Rawang | Dolomite Templer; Kampung Kenaga; Kampung Sungai Samak; Kota Emerald; Rawang | Batu Arang; Kampung Kenaga; Kampung Sungai Samak; Kota Emerald; Rawang |
| Selayang Baharu | | | Taman Templer; Bandar Baru Selayang; Taman Bukit Idaman; Taman Prima Selayang; Selayang Utama | | |
| Taman Templer | | | | Taman Templer; Bandar Baru Selayang; Selayang Baru; Taman Prima Selayang; Selayang Utama | Dolomite Templer; Bandar Baru Selayang; Selayang Baru; Taman Bukit Idaman; Taman Prima Selayang |

=== Current state assembly members ===
| No. | State Constituency | Member | Coalition (Party) |
|---|---|---|---|
| N13 | Kuang | Mohd Rafiq Mohd Abdullah | PN (BERSATU) |
| N14 | Rawang | Chua Wei Kiat | PH (PKR) |
| N15 | Taman Templer | Anfaal Saari | PH (AMANAH) |

=== Local governments & postcodes ===
| No. | State Constituency | Local Government | Postcode |
|---|---|---|---|
| N13 | Kuang | Selayang Municipal Council | 47000 Sungai Buloh; 48000, 48020, 48050 Rawang; 48100 Batu Arang; 48200 Serendah; 68100 Batu Caves |
| N14 | Rawang | Selayang Municipal Council | 47000 Sungai Buloh; 48000, 48020, 48050 Rawang; 48100 Batu Arang; 48200 Serendah; 68100 Batu Caves |
| N15 | Taman Templer | Selayang Municipal Council | 47000 Sungai Buloh; 48000, 48020, 48050 Rawang; 48100 Batu Arang; 48200 Serendah; 68100 Batu Caves |

== Election results ==
Malaysian general election, 2022
| Party | Candidate | Votes | % | ∆% |
|---|---|---|---|---|
| PH | William Leong Jee Keen | 72,773 | 50.23 | ▲50.23 |
| PN | Abdul Rashid Asari | 49,154 | 33.93 | ▲33.93 |
| BN | Chan Wun Hoong | 19,425 | 13.41 | ▼5.49 |
| PEJUANG | Salleh Amiruddin | 2,584 | 1.78 | ▲1.78 |
| Independent | Muhamamd Zaki Omar | 945 | 0.65 | ▲0.65 |
| Total valid votes | | 144,881 | 100.00 | |
| Total rejected ballots | | 1,188 | | |
| Unreturned ballots | | 300 | | |
| Turnout | | 146,369 | 79.81 | ▼5.79 |
| Registered electors | | 181,539 | | |
| Majority | | 23,619 | 16.30 | ▼25.19 |
| PH hold | | Swing | | |
Source(s) https://lom.agc.gov.my/ilims/upload/portal/akta/outputp/1753283/PUB612.pdf

Malaysian general election, 2018
| Party | Candidate | Votes | % | ∆% |
|---|---|---|---|---|
| PKR | William Leong Jee Keen | 60,158 | 61.38 | ▲3.78 |
| BN | Kang Meng Fuat | 19,501 | 19.90 | ▼17.94 |
| PAS | Hashim Abd Karim | 18,343 | 18.72 | ▲14.15 |
| Total valid votes | | 98,002 | 100.00 | |
| Total rejected ballots | | 953 | | |
| Unreturned ballots | | 495 | | |
| Turnout | | 99,450 | 85.60 | ▼1.78 |
| Registered electors | | 116,176 | | |
| Majority | | 40,657 | 41.49 | ▲21.73 |
| PKR hold | | Swing | | |
Source(s) "His Majesty's Government Gazette - Notice of Contested Election, Parliament for the State of Selangor [P.U. (B) 239/2018]" (PDF). Attorney General's Chambers of Malaysia. 3 May 2018. Archived from the original (PDF) on 2019-07-19. "Federal Government Gazette - Results of Contested Election and Statements of the Poll after the Official Addition of Votes, Parliamentary Constituencies for the State of Selangor [P.U. (B) 313/2018]" (PDF). Attorney General's Chambers of Malaysia. 28 May 2018. Archived from the original (PDF) on 2019-07-19.

Malaysian general election, 2013
| Party | Candidate | Votes | % | ∆% |
|---|---|---|---|---|
| PKR | William Leong Jee Keen | 52,343 | 57.60 | ▲5.71 |
| BN | Donald Lim Siang Chai | 34,385 | 37.84 | ▼8.02 |
| Pan-Malaysian Islamic Front | Mohd Hazizi Abdul Rahman | 4,152 | 4.57 | ▲4.57 |
| Total valid votes | | 90,880 | 100.00 | |
| Total rejected ballots | | 1,435 | | |
| Unreturned ballots | | 213 | | |
| Turnout | | 92,528 | 87.38 | ▲10.81 |
| Registered electors | | 105,895 | | |
| Majority | | 17,958 | 19.76 | ▲13.73 |
| PKR hold | | Swing | | |
Source(s) "Federal Government Gazette - Notice of Contested Election, Parliament for the State of Selangor [P.U. (B) 176/2013]" (PDF). Attorney General's Chambers of Malaysia. 26 April 2013. "Federal Government Gazette - Results of Contested Election and Statements of the Poll after the Official Addition of Votes, Parliamentary Constituencies for the State of Selangor [P.U. (B) 217/2013]" (PDF). Attorney General's Chambers of Malaysia. 22 May 2013. Archived from the original (PDF) on 2018-09-30.

Malaysian general election, 2008
| Party | Candidate | Votes | % | ∆% |
|---|---|---|---|---|
| PKR | William Leong Jee Keen | 30,701 | 51.89 | ▲25.37 |
| BN | Lee Li Yew | 27,134 | 45.86 | ▼27.62 |
| Parti Rakyat Malaysia | Koh Swe Yong | 1,332 | 2.25 | ▲2.25 |
| Total valid votes | | 59,167 | 100.00 | |
| Total rejected ballots | | 1,506 | | |
| Unreturned ballots | | 247 | | |
| Turnout | | 60,920 | 76.57 | ▲4.85 |
| Registered electors | | 79,557 | | |
| Majority | | 3,567 | 6.03 | ▼40.93 |
| PKR gain from BN | | Swing | | ? |

Malaysian general election, 2004
| Party | Candidate | Votes | % | ∆% |
|---|---|---|---|---|
| BN | Chan Kong Choy | 36,343 | 73.48 | ▲16.25 |
| PKR | Koh Swe Yong | 13,117 | 26.52 | ▲26.52 |
| Total valid votes | | 49,460 | 100.00 | |
| Total rejected ballots | | 1,444 | | |
| Unreturned ballots | | 129 | | |
| Turnout | | 51,033 | 71.72 | ▼2.22 |
| Registered electors | | 71,155 | | |
| Majority | | 23,226 | 46.96 | ▲32.50 |
| BN hold | | Swing | | |

Malaysian general election, 1999
| Party | Candidate | Votes | % | ∆% |
|---|---|---|---|---|
| BN | Chan Kong Choy | 34,979 | 57.23 | ▼29.80 |
| DAP | Zaitun Mohamed Kasim | 26,144 | 42.77 | ▲42.77 |
| Total valid votes | | 61,123 | 100.00 | |
| Total rejected ballots | | 1,453 | | |
| Unreturned ballots | | 699 | | |
| Turnout | | 63,275 | 73.94 | ▲4.05 |
| Registered electors | | 85,576 | | |
| Majority | | 8,835 | 14.46 | ▼59.60 |
| BN hold | | Swing | | |

Malaysian general election, 1995
| Party | Candidate | Votes | % | ∆% |
|---|---|---|---|---|
| BN | Chan Kong Choy | 45,392 | 87.03 | ▲15.09 |
| Independent | Zainul Amri Abdul Aziz | 6,765 | 12.97 | ▲12.97 |
| Total valid votes | | 52,157 | 100.00 | |
| Total rejected ballots | | 2,103 | | |
| Unreturned ballots | | 471 | | |
| Turnout | | 54,731 | 69.89 | ▼3.97 |
| Registered electors | | 78,310 | | |
| Majority | | 38,627 | 74.06 | ▲30.18 |
| BN hold | | Swing | | |

Malaysian general election, 1990
| Party | Candidate | Votes | % | ∆% |
|---|---|---|---|---|
| BN | Zaleha Ismail | 51,062 | 71.94 | ▼9.60 |
| DAP | Lee Yee Lian | 19,920 | 28.06 | ▲28.06 |
| Total valid votes | | 70,982 | 100.00 | |
| Total rejected ballots | | 2,500 | | |
| Unreturned ballots | | 0 | | |
| Turnout | | 73,482 | 73.86 | ▲6.76 |
| Registered electors | | 100,848 | | |
| Majority | | 31,142 | 43.88 | ▼19.20 |
| BN hold | | Swing | | |

Malaysian general election, 1986
| Party | Candidate | Votes | % | ∆% |
|---|---|---|---|---|
| BN | Zaleha Ismail | 40,681 | 81.54 | ▲14.74 |
| PAS | Talib Bakti | 9,209 | 18.46 | ▲11.85 |
| Total valid votes | | 49,890 | 100.00 | |
| Total rejected ballots | | 2,270 | | |
| Unreturned ballots | | 0 | | |
| Turnout | | 52,160 | 67.10 | ▼2.72 |
| Registered electors | | 77,737 | | |
| Majority | | 31,472 | 63.08 | ▲22.87 |
| BN hold | | Swing | | |

Malaysian general election, 1982
| Party | Candidate | Votes | % | ∆% |
|---|---|---|---|---|
| BN | Rahmah Othman | 51,353 | 66.80 | ▲0.15 |
| DAP | Lee Yee Lian | 20,444 | 26.59 | ▼3.36 |
| PAS | Khalid Siri | 5,081 | 6.61 | ▲6.61 |
| Total valid votes | | 76,878 | 100.00 | |
| Total rejected ballots | | 2,130 | | |
| Unreturned ballots | | 0 | | |
| Turnout | | 79,008 | 69.82 | ▼3.83 |
| Registered electors | | 113,159 | | |
| Majority | | 30,909 | 40.21 | ▲3.51 |
| BN hold | | Swing | | |

Malaysian general election, 1978
| Party | Candidate | Votes | % | ∆% |
|---|---|---|---|---|
| BN | Rafidah Aziz | 38,627 | 66.65 | ▼4.31 |
| DAP | Zainal Rampak | 17,357 | 29.95 | ▲2.67 |
| PEKEMAS | Zainuddin Karim | 1,973 | 3.40 | ▲3.40 |
| Total valid votes | | 57,957 | 100.00 | |
| Total rejected ballots | | 1,956 | | |
| Unreturned ballots | | 0 | | |
| Turnout | | 59,913 | 73.65 | ▲16.45 |
| Registered electors | | 81,350 | | |
| Majority | | 21,270 | 36.70 | ▼6.98 |
| BN hold | | Swing | | |

Malaysian general by-election, 14 June 1975 Upon the death of incumbent, Walter Loh Poh Khan
| Party | Candidate | Votes | % | ∆% |
|---|---|---|---|---|
| BN | Rosemary Chow Poh Kheng | 19,338 | 70.96 | ▲12.09 |
| DAP | Idrus Idris | 7,434 | 27.28 | ▲3.04 |
| Independent | Ismail Man | 481 | 1.76 | ▲1.76 |
| Total valid votes | | 27,253 | 100.00 | |
| Total rejected ballots | | 708 | | |
| Unreturned ballots | | 0 | | |
| Turnout | | 27,961 | 57.20 | ▼15.23 |
| Registered electors | | 48,885 | | |
| Majority | | 11,904 | 43.68 | ▲9.05 |
| BN hold | | Swing | | |

Malaysian general election, 1974
| Party | Candidate | Votes | % |
|---|---|---|---|
| BN | Walter Loh Poh Khan | 16,779 | 58.87 |
| DAP | Pan Soo Pin | 6,908 | 24.24 |
| PEKEMAS | Zainal Rampak | 4,814 | 16.89 |
| Total valid votes | | 28,501 | 100.00 |
| Total rejected ballots | | 1,095 | |
| Unreturned ballots | | 0 | |
| Turnout | | 29,596 | 72.43 |
| Registered electors | | 42,662 | |
| Majority | | 9,871 | 34.63 |
This was a new constituency created.
