= Jamaluddin Jarjis =

Malaysian politician

Yang Berbahagia Tan Sri Dato' Sri Jamaluddin Jarjis PSM SSAP SIMP SJMK SPMP SAP
- جمال الدين محمد جرجيس
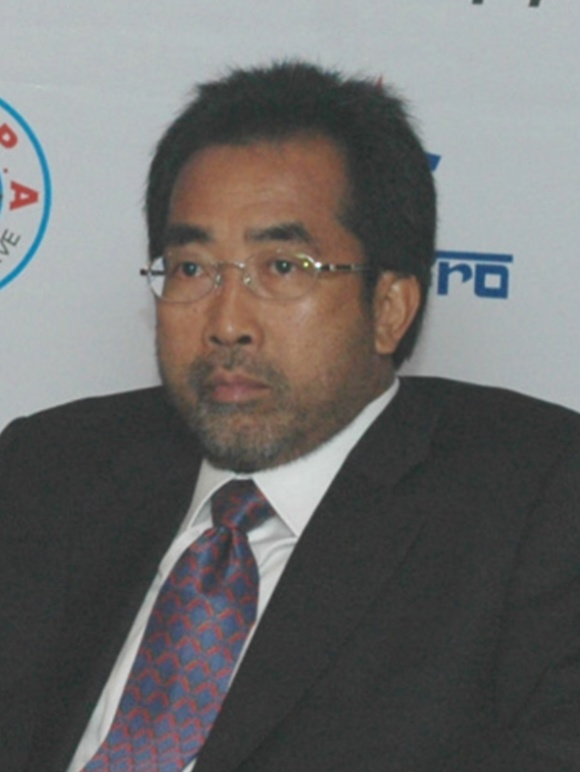
- Jamaluddin in 2006

Minister of Science, Technology and Innovation
- In office 24 March 2004 – 17 March 2008
- Monarchs: Sirajuddin; Mizan Zainal Abidin
- Prime Minister: Abdullah Ahmad Badawi
- Deputy: Kong Cho Ha
- Preceded by: Law Hieng Ding as Minister of Science, Technology and Environment
- Succeeded by: Maximus Ongkili
- Constituency: Rompin

Second Minister of Finance
- In office 20 November 2002 – 26 March 2004 Serving with Mahathir Mohamad (2002–2003), Abdullah Ahmad Badawi (2003–2004)
- Monarch: Sirajuddin
- Prime Minister: Mahathir Mohamad; Abdullah Ahmad Badawi
- Deputy: Shafie Salleh; Chan Kong Choy (2002–2003); Ng Yen Yen (2003–2004)
- Preceded by: Mustapa Mohamed
- Succeeded by: Nor Mohamed Yakcop
- Constituency: Rompin

Member of Parliament for Rompin
- In office 20 October 1990 – 4 April 2015
- Preceded by: Mohamed Amin Daud
- Succeeded by: Hasan Arifin
- Majority: 15,114 (2013); 10,679 (2008); 9,350 (2004); 6,028 (1999); 12,825 (1995); 13,128 (1990)

Personal details
- Born: 25 May 1951 Pekan, Pahang, Federation of Malaya (now Malaysia)
- Died: 4 April 2015 (aged 63) Semenyih, Kajang, Selangor
- Resting place: Makam Pahlawan, Masjid Negara, Kuala Lumpur
- Party: United Malays National Organisation–Barisan Nasional
- Spouse: Kalsom Ismail
- Children: 4
- Education: University of Manchester; University of Manitoba; McGill University
- Occupation: Politician, diplomat
- Profession: Engineer

Jamaluddin bin Mohd Jarjis (25 May 1951 – 4 April 2015) was a Malaysian politician, diplomat and Minister of Science, Technology and Innovation. He served as the Chairman of the 1 Malaysia Peoples' Housing (PR1MA) and Malaysian special envoy to the United States.

== Early life and education ==
Born on 25 May 1951 in Pekan, Pahang, Jamaluddin Jarjis obtained a First Class Honours Bachelor of Science Degree in Electrical Engineering from the University of Manchester, United Kingdom in 1974 and MSc in Electrical Engineering from the University of Manitoba, Canada in 1977. He received his PhD in Electrical Engineering (Power Systems) from McGill University in 1980.

== Political career ==
Jamaluddin was a Member of Parliament for Rompin, Pahang from 1990 until his death. He was elected to the UMNO Supreme Council in May 2000. In 2002, he was appointed as the Second Minister of Finance by Prime Minister Mahathir Mohamad.

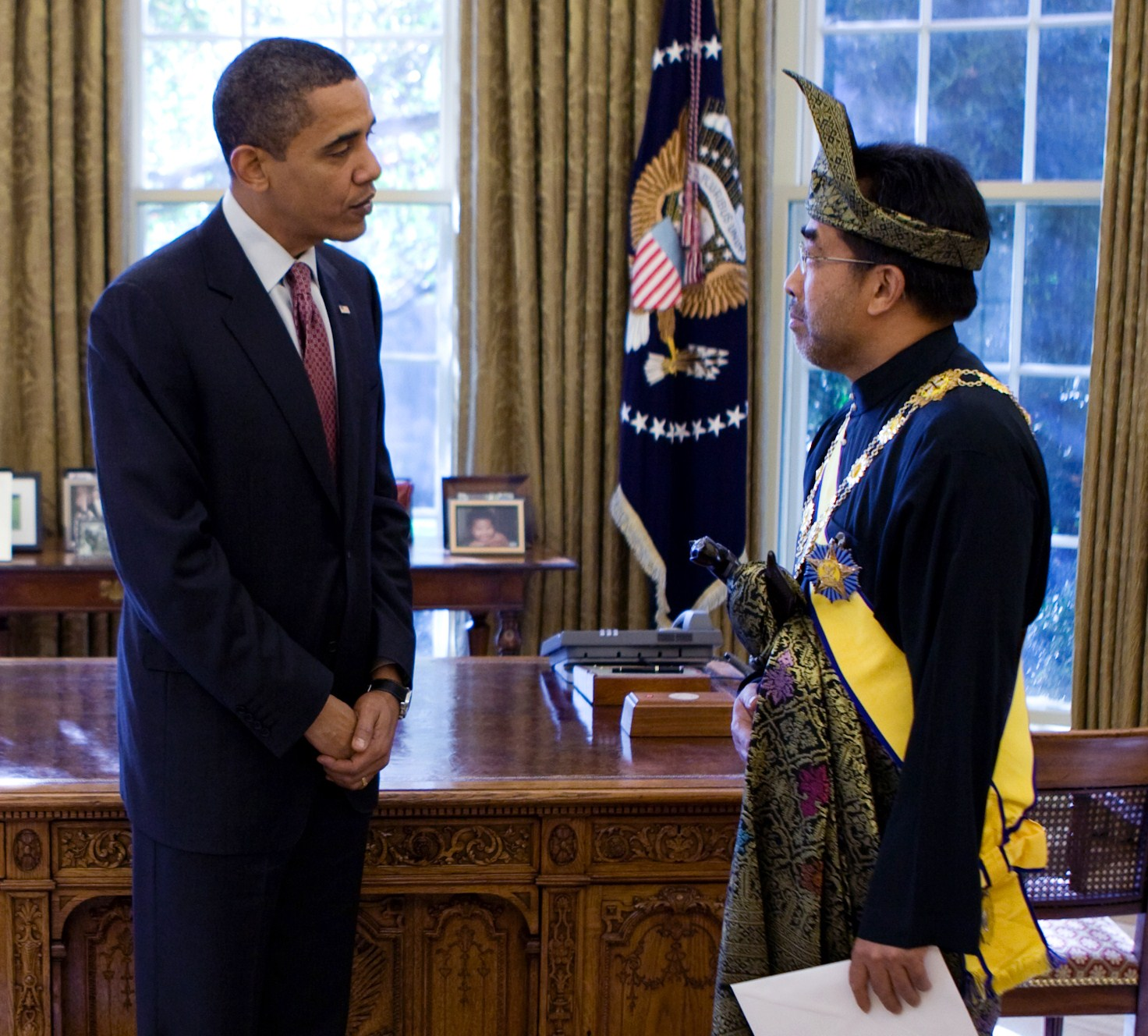
Jamluddim with Barack Obama in 2009

While serving as Science, Technology and Innovation Minister, Jamaluddin oversaw the Angkasawan program, which resulted in Dr. Sheikh Muszaphar Shukor becoming the first Malaysian in space on 10 October 2007, when he blasted off to the International Space Station on board Soyuz TMA-11.

=== Cabinet positions ===
Jamaluddin held various positions in the Cabinet of Malaysia:

- Second Minister of Finance (November 2002 – January 2004)
- Minister of Domestic Trade and Consumer Affairs (January 2004 – March 2004)
- Minister of Science, Technology and Innovation (March 2004 – March 2008)
- Ambassador of Malaysia to the United States (July 2009 – February 2012)

== Family ==
Jamaluddin was married to a dentist, Puan Sri Dr. Kalsom Ismail, a renowned hardliner. The couple had four children.

Jamaluddin died in April 2015. In August 2018, his 83-year-old mother Aminah Abdullah has sought the Syariah Court to issue a faraid (Islamic wealth distribution) certificate to seek her share of her late son's estate said to be worth at least RM2.1 billion.

== Death ==
On 4 April 2015, Jamaluddin Jarjis was killed when an AS 3655N2 Dauphin (Registration Number 9M-1GB) crashed into a jungle at Jalan Sungai Lalang in Kampung Pasir Baru near Semenyih, Selangor. Among those killed were a businessman, CEO of SP Baiduri Sdn Bhd, Tan Huat Seang and also a private secretary in the Prime Minister's Office, Azlin Alias. He was buried at Makam Pahlawan, located inside the Masjid Negara compound, Kuala Lumpur.

== Election results ==
Parliament of Malaysia
Year	Constituency	Candidate	Votes	Pct	Opponent(s)	Votes	Pct	Ballot casts	Majority	Turnout
1990	P081 Rompin	Jamaluddin Jarjis (UMNO)	20,994	72.74%	Salim Awg. Kalib (PAS)	7,866	27.26%	29,770	13,128	74.78%
1995	P085 Rompin	Jamaluddin Jarjis (UMNO)	18,531	76.46%	Yahya Awang (PAS)	5,706	23.54%	25,313	12,825	76.55%
1999	P085 Rompin	Jamaluddin Jarjis (UMNO)	15,907	61.69%	Mazlan Mohamed Yasin (PAS)	9,879	38.31%	26,554	6,028	77.36%
2004	P091 Rompin	Jamaluddin Jarjis (UMNO)	19,359	65.92%	Sukri Ahmad (PAS)	10,009	34.08%	30,215	9,350	78.85%
2008	P091 Rompin	Jamaluddin Jarjis (UMNO)	21,308	66.72%	Mazlan Mohamed Yasin (PAS)	10,629	33.28%	32,930	10,679	78.97%
2013	P091 Rompin	Jamaluddin Jarjis (UMNO)	30,040	66.81%	Nuridah Mohd Salleh (PAS)	14,926	33.19%	46,014	15,114	85.85%

== Honours ==
=== Honours of Malaysia ===
- Malaysia
  - Commander of the Order of Loyalty to the Crown of Malaysia (PSM) – Tan Sri (2014)
- Pahang
  - Companion of the Order of Sultan Ahmad Shah of Pahang (SAP) (1990)
  - Knight Companion of the Order of the Crown of Pahang (DIMP) – Dato' (1992)
  - Grand Knight of the Order of the Crown of Pahang (SIMP) – formerly Dato', now Dato' Indera (2001)
  - Grand Knight of the Order of Sultan Ahmad Shah of Pahang (SSAP) – Dato' Sri (2004)
- Kelantan
  - Knight Grand Commander of the Order of the Life of the Crown of Kelantan (SJMK) – Dato' (2004)
- Perlis
  - Knight Grand Commander of the Order of the Crown of Perlis (SPMP) – Dato' Seri (2007)
