= List of members of the Dewan Rakyat =

This is a complete list of members of the Dewan Rakyat, lower house of the Parliament of Malaysia.

- Members of the Dewan Rakyat, 1st Malayan Parliament; 1959–1964
- Members of the Dewan Rakyat, 2nd Malaysian Parliament; 1964–1969
- Members of the Dewan Rakyat, 3rd Malaysian Parliament; 1971–1974
- Members of the Dewan Rakyat, 4th Malaysian Parliament; 1974–1978
- Members of the Dewan Rakyat, 5th Malaysian Parliament; 1978–1982
- Members of the Dewan Rakyat, 6th Malaysian Parliament; 1982–1986
- Members of the Dewan Rakyat, 7th Malaysian Parliament; 1986–1990
- Members of the Dewan Rakyat, 8th Malaysian Parliament; 1990–1995
- Members of the Dewan Rakyat, 9th Malaysian Parliament; 1995–1999
- Members of the Dewan Rakyat, 10th Malaysian Parliament; 1999–2004
- Members of the Dewan Rakyat, 11th Malaysian Parliament; 2004–2008
- Members of the Dewan Rakyat, 12th Malaysian Parliament; 2008–2013
- Members of the Dewan Rakyat, 13th Malaysian Parliament; 2013–2018
- Members of the Dewan Rakyat, 14th Malaysian Parliament; 2018–2022
- Members of the Dewan Rakyat, 15th Malaysian Parliament; 2022–present
