= Jerai =

Jerai may refer to:

- Mount Jerai
- Jerai (federal constituency), represented in the Dewan Rakyat
