= Teroi =

Teroi is a small kampung (village) located in Yan District, Kedah, Malaysia.

The name "Teroi" is adapted from Sungai Teroi, a river that passes from Mount Jerai. Sungai Teroi is also connected to Rimba Reakrasi Sungai Teroi, or the Sungai Teroi Forest Recreation Park, at Gunung Jerai. Whilst, Gunung Jerai is the famous jungle tracking places for those who want to explore the nature in flora and fauna.

Teroi comprises Kampung Teroi Tua (also known as Kampung Titi Teras), and Kampung Teroi Bukit (also known as Kampung Ulu Teroi). However, Teroi's name is also used in a geographical scale (known as Simpang Empat Teroi, or Teroi Crossroad) to include Dulang, the Teroi Township and Perupok.
