= Jamil Khir Baharom =

Malaysian politician (born 1961)

Yang Berbahagia Major General (Rtd) Dato' Seri Jamil Khir Baharom SSDK SSAP PSAT DSDK DSNS DIMP PAT JSM DNS KAT KMN AMK PPS PPA PNBB
- جميل خير بن بهرام
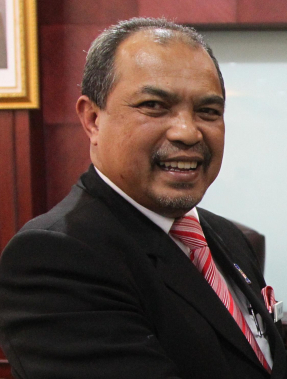

Chairman of Ex-Serviceman Affairs Corporation
- Incumbent
- Assumed office 8 February 2021
- Minister: Ismail Sabri Yaakob (2021); Hishammuddin Hussein (2021‍–‍2022); Mohamad Hasan (2022–2023); Mohamed Khaled Nordin (since 2023)
- Preceded by: Abdul Aziz Ibrahim

Minister in the Prime Minister's Department (Religious Affairs)
- In office 10 April 2009 – 9 May 2018
- Monarchs: Mizan Zainal Abidin; Abdul Halim; Muhammad V
- Prime Minister: Najib Razak
- Deputy: Mashitah Ibrahim (2009–2013); Asyraf Wajdi Dusuki (2015‍–‍2018)
- Preceded by: Ahmad Zahid Hamidi
- Succeeded by: Mujahid Yusof Rawa
- Constituency: Jerai

Member of the Malaysian Parliament for Jerai
- In office 5 May 2013 – 9 May 2018
- Preceded by: Mohd Firdaus Jaafar
- Succeeded by: Sabri Azit
- Majority: 1,196 (2013)

Personal details
- Born: Jamil Khir bin Baharom; 25 June 1961 (age 65) Yan, Kedah, Federation of Malaya (now Malaysia)
- Citizenship: Malaysian
- Party: United Malays National Organisation (UMNO)
- Other political affiliations: Barisan Nasional (BN)
- Spouse: Fatmawati Saidin
- Children: 6
- Education: University of Malaya; Cordoba University
- Occupation: Politician
- Profession: Military officer

Military service
- Allegiance: Malaysia
- Branch: Malaysian Army
- Service years: 1986–2009
- Rank: Major General
- Unit: Military Religious Corps
- Commands: Director of the Religious Corps

Jamil Khir bin Baharom (Jawi: جميل خير بن بهرام) is a Malaysian politician and former military officer who has served as Chairman of Ex-Serviceman Affairs Corporation since February 2021. He served as Minister in the Prime Minister's Department in charge of Religious Affairs from April 2009 to the collapse of the Barisan Nasional (BN) administration in May 2018 the Member of Parliament (MP) for Jerai from May 2013 to May 2018, Senator from April 2009 to May 2013. He was a major general in the Kor Agama Angkatan Tentera of the Malaysian Army.

== Biography ==
Jamil Khir obtained his Bachelor of Sharia from the University of Malaya in 1986 and Master in Islamic Studies from the Graduate School of Islamic and Social Sciences, Cordoba University in Virginia in 2000. He began his military service in 1986, as lieutenant in the Military Religious Corps (KAGAT). He was promoted to colonel in 2002 and brigadier general in 2005. In 2005, he was appointed director of Kagat, the first ever two-star general to serve in that capacity.

He is a member of the Radio Televisyen Malaysia (RTM) Religious Programme Advisory Committee and often appears on RTM1's religious talk show Forum Perdana Ehwal Islam.

== Political career ==
In April 2009, Jamil Khir was appointed a Senator in the Dewan Negara. He joined Prime Minister Najib Razak's inaugural Cabinet, serving as Minister in the Prime Minister's Department in charge of religious affairs and heading the Department of Islamic Advancement of Malaysia (JAKIM).

Following the revelation by authorities in 2010 that terrorist group Jemaah Islamiah (JI) had been actively expanding its activities in Malaysia, Jamil Khir became one of the leading figures in the Cabinet to deal with the situation. He assured Malaysians that local Muslim missionary groups and religious schools were not influenced by JI and that his department was working with the Home Ministry to stifle the purported JI movement in Malaysia. Regarding terrorism and religion, he said: "There are individuals or groups trying to make their way into these institutions to influence students. They use religion to realise their goal and this is the reason why terrorism is linked to Islam." He also said that Malaysian students in the Middle East were being monitored for suspicious activity.

Following a controversy in March 2011 involving underaged girls being married to middle-aged men, Jamil Khir defended the country's Syariah marriage laws, which apply only to Muslims. Rights groups called for laws that allow marriage under the age of 16 if religious officials give their consent to be amended. However, Jamil Khir disagreed, arguing that the current laws are sufficient as authorities "does not simply grant the consent [to marry someone aged 16 and below]."

In June 2010, the site of the Warrior's Day celebration was moved from the National Monument as the National Fatwa Council deemed celebrations around the statues as idolatry and contrary to Islamic practices.

Jamil Khir is an outspoken opponent of homosexuality. In November 2011, he called homosexuality "unconstitutional"; though he later clarified he meant it is against the Penal Code. In response to a gay Malaysian pastor getting married in New York, Jamil Khir said same-sex marriage is a form of "extreme human rights" and "will create social problems." He also criticised LGBT-rights event Seksualiti Merdeka for promoting "a deviation from society's norms."

In the 2013 election, Jamil Khir moved to the House of Representatives, winning the seat of Jerai in Kedah. He defeated the incumbent Pan-Malaysian Islamic Party (PAS), Mohd Firdaus Jaafar.

In the 2018 election, Jamil Khir failed to retain the Jerai parliamentary seat when he lost to Sabri Azit from PAS, in a closely three-corner fight with Akhramsyah Muammar Ubaidah Sanusi from People's Justice Party (PKR) of Pakatan Harapan (PH).

== Controversies ==
=== Fake Allegation Of Zakat Fund Misuse ===
On June 21, 2011, People's Justice Party (PKR)'s Secretary-General, Saifuddin Nasution Ismail questioned the Federal Government Islamic Religious Council (MAIWP) misuse of RM32 thousand zakat. The RM31,150.00 check was submitted to Che Mat, Zainul Riijal Talha & Amir, who was self-signed by Che Mat, who is also Secretary MAIWP on April 21, 2010.While they are not the eighth asnaf. Deputy Minister in the Prime Minister's Department Datuk Dr Mashitah Ibrahim revealed that MAIWP's zakat allocation was used to finance the legal fees of Dato' Seri Jamil Khir Baharom and JAWI Director-General Datuk Che Mat Ali. They both faced court action for not initiating prosecution against Saiful Bukhari in the case of Qazaf involving case of Defamation II Datuk Seri Anwar Ibrahim. The question arises as "Datuk Che Mat Ali approves Datuk Che Mat Ali."

In September 2011, Jamil Khir denied an allegation by Malaysia Today that he used zakat funds collected by religious authorities to finance a house for his family. Malaysia Today had published a photo of his home, alleging that it was worth millions of ringgit. Jamil Khir said his house was renovated with his own money.

=== Allegation of YaPEIM Fund Abuse ===
On 11 November 2015, National Oversight and Whistleblowers (NOW) has claimed that Jamil Khir had used Malaysian Islamic Economy Development Foundation (YaPEIM) funds to go shopping and play golf in the United States. Jamil Khir denied the allegation, stressing that it was not a recreational trip and has demanded for written apology from NOW's director, Akmal Nasir.

Akmal Nasir appealed to be referred the law was decided by the Court of Appeal in the case of Defamation suit of Pahang Menteri Besar Datuk Seri Adnan Yaakob against Utusan Melayu (M) Bhd. (UMMB). Then the court strikes out Jamil Khir's lawsuit against Akmal Nasir.

The High Court has struck out a suit by Yayasan Pembangunan Anak Yatim/Miskin (Foundation for the Advancement of Orphans and the Poor, or Pemangkin) against YaPEIM and six others over misconduct and efforts to shut down the foundation.

=== False statement ===
In February 2020, while testifying as a defense witness in the trial of former Prime Minister Najib Razak concerning SRC International Sdn Bhd, Jamil Khir Baharom's testimony claiming that he was with Najib in Saudi Arabia on 11 January 2010 for an informal meeting with the late King Abdullah was challenged by a Malaysian Anti-Corruption Commission (MACC) investigating officer. Mohd Nasharudin Amir, who serves as MACC’s assistant commissioner, informed the High Court that an article published in a bulletin by the Islamic Development Department (Jakim) indicated that Jamil Khir was, in fact, addressing a gathering in Putrajaya on that very day.

=== Detained by MACC ===
On 1 September 2026, Jamil Khir Baharom was detained by the Malaysian Anti-Corruption Agency (MACC) over the Tabung Haji RCI probe.

== Election results ==
Parliament of Malaysia
Year	Constituency	Candidate	Votes	Pct	Opponent(s)	Votes	Pct	Ballots cast	Majority	Turnout
2013	P012 Jerai	Jamil Khir Baharom (UMNO)	32,429	50.94%	Mohd Firdaus Jaafar (PAS)	31,233	49.06%	64,778	1,196	87.06%
2018	P012 Jerai	Jamil Khir Baharom (UMNO)	21,773	33.12%	Sabri Azit (PAS)	22,312	33.94%	66,920	539	83.68%
2018	P012 Jerai	Jamil Khir Baharom (UMNO)	21,773	33.12%	Akhramsyah Muammar Ubaidah Sanusi (PPBM)	21,651	32.94%	66,920	539	83.68%
2022	P012 Jerai	Jamil Khir Bahrom (UMNO)	16,269	19.77%	Sabri Azit (PAS)	49,461	60.10%	83,294	33,192	78.37%
2022	P012 Jerai	Jamil Khir Bahrom (UMNO)	16,269	19.77%	Zulhazmi Shariff (DAP)	15,590	18.94%	83,294	33,192	78.37%
2022	P012 Jerai	Jamil Khir Bahrom (UMNO)	16,269	19.77%	Mohd Nizam Mahsyar (PEJUANG)	973	1.18%	83,294	33,192	78.37%

== Honours ==
=== Honours of Malaysia ===
- Malaysia
  - Companion of the Order of Loyalty to the Crown of Malaysia (JSM) (2008)
  - Officer of the Order of the Defender of the Realm (KMN) (1997)
  - Recipient of the Loyal Service Medal (PPS)
  - Recipient of the General Service Medal (PPA)
  - Recipient of the United Nations Missions Service Medal (PNBB) with "SOMALIA" clasp
  - Recipient of the 10th Yang di-Pertuan Agong Installation Medal
  - Recipient of the 12th Yang di-Pertuan Agong Installation Medal
  - Recipient of the 14th Yang di-Pertuan Agong Installation Medal
  - Recipient of the 15th Yang di-Pertuan Agong Installation Medal
- Malaysian Armed Forces
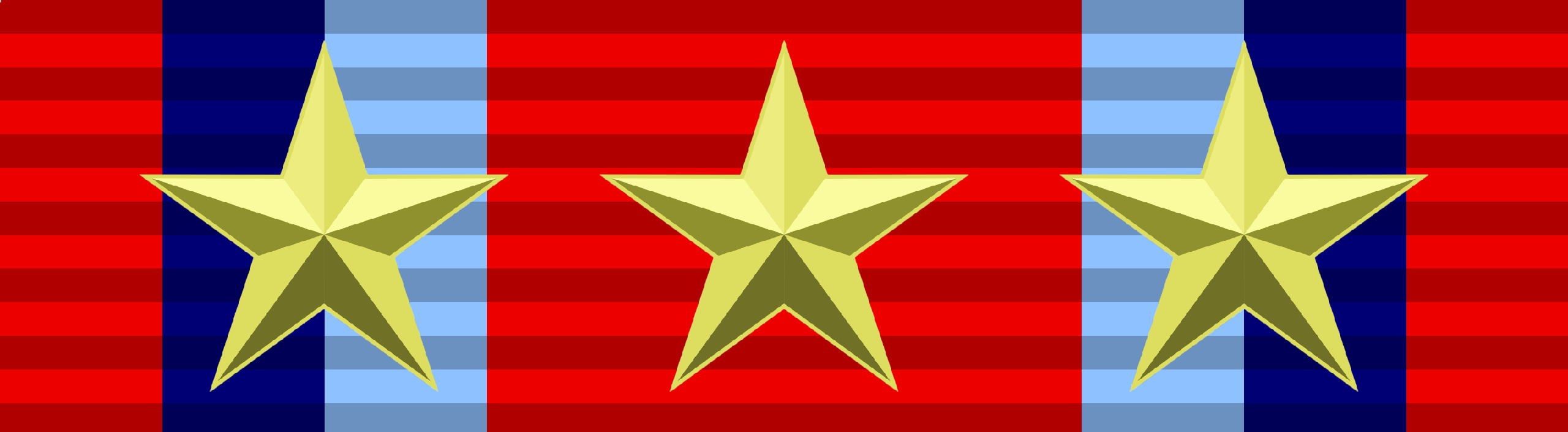
  - Loyal Commander of the Most Gallant Order of Military Service (PSAT)
  - Warrior of the Most Gallant Order of Military Service (PAT)
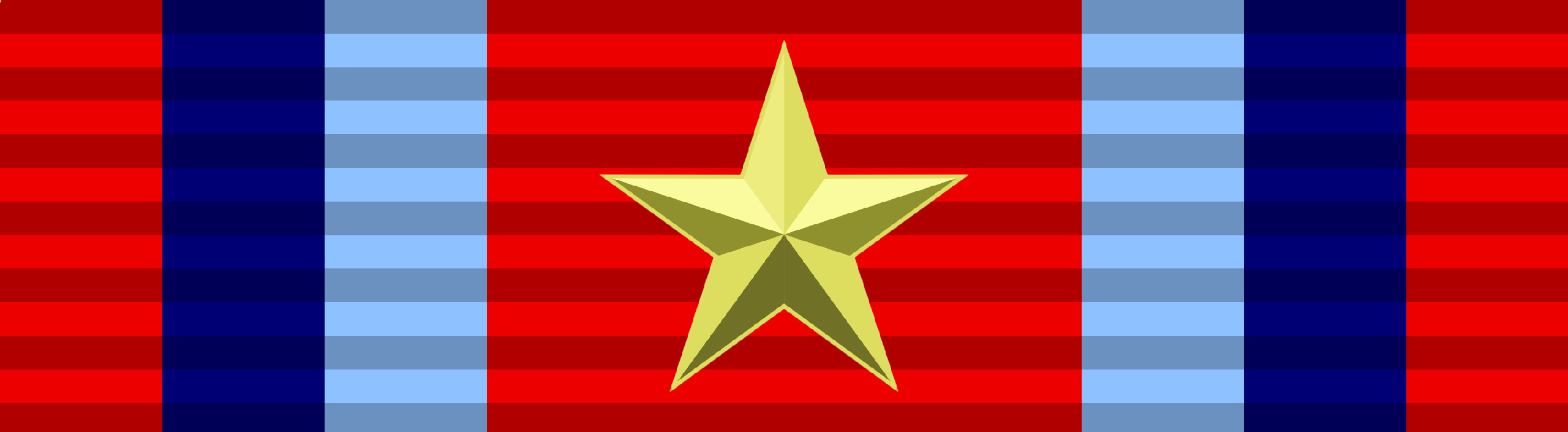
  - Officer of the Most Gallant Order of Military Service (KAT)
- Kedah
  - Grand Commander of the Order of Loyalty to the Royal House of Kedah (SSDK) – Dato' Seri (2010)
  - Commander of the Order of Loyalty to the Royal House of Kedah (DSDK) – Dato' (2007)
  - Member of the Order of the Crown of Kedah (AMK) (2002)
  - Recipient of the Sultan Sallehuddin Installation Medal (2018)
- Negeri Sembilan
  - Companion of the Order of Loyalty to Negeri Sembilan (DSNS) – Dato' (2006)
  - Companion of the Order of Loyalty to Negeri Sembilan (DNS) (2005)
- Pahang
  - Grand Companion of the Order of Sultan Ahmad Shah of Pahang (SSAP) – Dato' Sri (2015)
  - Companion of the Order of the Crown of Pahang (DIMP) – Dato' (2006)
- Selangor
  - Recipient of the Sultan Salahuddin Silver Jubilee Medal (1985)
  - Recipient of the Sultan Sharafuddin Coronation Medal (2003)

=== Foreign honours ===
- United Nations
  - Recipient of the UNOSOM II Medal

== See also ==
- Jerai (federal constituency)
- List of people who have served in both Houses of the Malaysian Parliament
