= 1992 Jerai by-election =

Election in Malaysia

← 1990	4 March 1992	1995 →

Jerai seat in the Dewan Rakyat
	BN	PAS
Candidate	Badruddin Amiruldin	Nasir Othman
Party	BN (UMNO)	PAS
Alliance		APU
Popular vote	14,538	10,812
Percentage	57.35%	42.65%
Jerai MP before election
Ghazali Ahmad
BN (UMNO)
Elected Jerai MP
Badruddin Amiruldin
BN (UMNO)

The 1992 Jerai by-election is a by-election for the Dewan Rakyat federal seat of Jerai, Malaysia that were held on 4 March 1992. It was called following the death of the incumbent, Ghazali Ahmad on 5 February 1992.

== Background ==
Ghazali Ahmad, a candidate from Barisan Nasional (BN), were first elected to the Parliament of Malaysia federal seat of Jerai at the 1986 Malaysian general election, and defends the seat at the 1990 Malaysian general election, defeating Subky Latiff from Pan Malaysian Islamic Party (PAS). He were the deputy chief of United Malays National Organization (UMNO) Jerai division.

On 5 February 1992, Ghazali died at Alor Star General Hospital, having been admitted there the night before after suffering a heart attack. His death means that his Jerai federal seat were vacated, and necessitates for by-election for the seat to be held, as the seat were vacated more that 2 years before the expiry of Malaysian parliament current terms. Election Commission of Malaysia (SPR) announced that the by-election for the seat will be held on 4 March 1992, with 22 February 1992 set as the nomination day.

== Nomination and campaign ==
Both BN and PAS has announced they will contest the by-election. BN nominated Badruddin Amiruldin, the UMNO Jerai division Youth chief, and a businessman who is the vice-president of Kedah Malays Chamber of Commerce and Industry. Meanwhile, PAS nominated Nasir Othman, the PAS Jerai division committee member and former religious school principal who is an Al-Azhar University graduate.

On the nomination day 22 February 1992, Badruddin from BN and Nasir from PAS handed their nomination papers, and after nomination closed, SPR confirms that there will be a straight fight between both candidates for the Jerai seat.

== Timeline ==
The key dates are listed below.

Date	Event
17 February 1992	Issue of the Writ of Election
22 February 1992	Nomination Day
22 February - 3 March 1992	Campaigning Period
	Early polling day for postal and overseas voters
4 March 1992	Polling Day

== Results ==
Malaysian general by-election, 4 March 1992: Jerai Upon the death of incumbent, Ghazali Ahmad
Party	Candidate	Votes	%	∆%
BN	Badruddin Amiruldin	14,538	57.35	▼1.22
PAS	Nasir Othman	10,812	42.65	▲1.22
Total valid votes		25,350	100.00	
Total rejected ballots				
Unreturned ballots				
Turnout				
Registered electors		37,171		
Majority		3,726	14.70	▼2.44
BN hold		Swing		

== Previous results ==
Malaysian general election, 1990: Jerai
Party	Candidate	Votes	%	∆%
BN	Ghazali Ahmad	15,723	58.57	▲2.62
PAS	Ahmad Subki Abd. Latif @ Subky Abd. Latif	11,121	41.43	▼2.62
Total valid votes		26,844	100.00	
Total rejected ballots		620		
Unreturned ballots		0		
Turnout		27,464	73.89	▲2.20
Registered electors		37,171		
Majority		4,602	17.14	▲5.24
BN hold		Swing		
