= Amiruldin =

Amiruldin is a name. Notable people with the name include:

- Amiruldin Asraf (born 1997), Singaporean footballer
- Badruddin Amiruldin (born 1951), Malaysian politician
