= Nasharudin Mat Isa =

Malaysian politician

Yang Berbahagia Dato' Nasharudin Mat Isa DIMP
- نصرالدين مت عيسى

Chief Executive Officer of the Global Movement of Moderates Foundation
- In office 1 November 2015 – 30 July 2018
- Preceded by: Saifuddin Abdullah
- Succeeded by: Organization disbanded

Member of the Malaysian Parliament for Bachok
- In office 8 March 2008 – 5 May 2013
- Preceded by: Awang Adek Hussin (BN–UMNO)
- Succeeded by: Ahmad Marzuk Shaary (PR–PAS)
- Majority: 2,901 (2008)

Member of the Malaysian Parliament for Yan
- In office 29 November 1999 – 21 March 2004
- Preceded by: Badruddin Amiruldin (BN–UMNO)
- Succeeded by: Constituency abolished
- Majority: 182 (1999)

Personal details
- Born: 19 October 1962 (age 63) Rembau, Negeri Sembilan, Federation of Malaya (now Malaysia)
- Party: Malaysian Islamic Party (PAS) (1996–2013)
- Other political affiliations: Pakatan Rakyat (PR) (2008-2013); Barisan Alternatif (BA) (1998-2004); Angkatan Perpaduan Ummah (APU) (until 1996)
- Spouse: Munirah Mahmud
- Education: University of Glasgow
- Occupation: Politician

Nasharudin bin Mat Isa (born 19 October 1962) is a Malaysian politician and activist. He was former Member of the Parliament of Malaysia. He represented the constituency of Yan, Kedah, from 1999 to 2004, and the seat of Bachok, Kelantan, from 2008 to 2013. From 2005 to 2011 he was the Deputy President of the Pan-Malaysian Islamic Party (PAS).

== Background ==
Nasharudin was born in Rembau, Negeri Sembilan, Malaysia.

Contrary to popular belief, Nasharudin never attended the University of Glasgow. Before entering active politics, he was a lecturer at the International Islamic University of Malaysia (IIUM) and National University of Malaysia (UKM).

He speaks Malay, Arabic, English and Urdu.

== Politics ==
In 1999 Nasharudin left academia to take up the post of PAS's Secretary-General, making him the party's top administrative officer. He was hand-picked for the position by the party's president, Fadzil Noor, who had brought Nasharudin and other urban professionals into PAS during the 1990s to modernise the party. The 1999 general election saw Nasharudin's first election to Parliament for the seat of Yan in Kedah.

In the 2004 general election, Nasharudin lost his parliamentary seat when he switched to run for the Besut seat in Terengganu. The following year, he became the Deputy President of PAS, making him the party's second-most senior elected leader after the President, Abdul Hadi Awang. Nasharudin's election to the position was a surprise as the senior cleric Haron Din had been slated to run against the incumbent, Hassan Shukri, but withdrew due to illness. In Haron's absence, Nasharudin defeated Hassan by a narrow margin.

In 2008 general election, he returned to Parliament, winning the seat of Bachok in Kelantan. The following year, he won re-election as Deputy President of PAS, defeating two other candidates. His victory was seen by observers as a win for PAS' conservatives. However, he was ultimately defeated for re-election in 2011 by moderate candidate Mohamed Sabu.

During his deputy presidency, Nasharudin had been one of PAS' leading proponents of entering talks with its long-time opponents United Malays National Organisation (UMNO) to establish a ruling Malay coalition between UMNO and PAS. After travelling to Gaza in 2013 with UMNO's former president and Malaysia's former Prime Minister, Najib Razak, he was expelled from PAS's governing Syura Council on 14 January 2013. Nasharuddin was subsequently sacked from PAS over statements critical of the party and for being absent from meetings in 2013.

He did not recontest his parliamentary seat in the 2013 general election.

== Social works ==
Having left both PAS's leadership and the Parliament in 2013, Nasharudin became chairman of the Nassar Foundation, a non-government organisation concerned with Islamic matters. From this position he spoke out against the use of the word "Allah" by Christians to describe God, and led protests against what he perceived as the lack of support from the Egyptian military government for people in Gaza.

Nasharuddin was the former Executive Chairman and chief executive officer (CEO) of the Global Movement of Moderates (GMM) Foundation, an organization established in 2012 by the then Prime Minister Najib Razak to promote moderation and to fight extremism. He was appointed the CEO in 2015 after he assisted Najib Razak to forge political alliances with PAS president Abdul Hadi Awang after the 2013 general election, replacing Saifuddin Abdullah who has left GMM and UMNO. Under his leadership, the organisation became irrelevant as extremism flourished and the foundation has been alleged to be failed and a wastage of public funds as it had contradicted its official policy of moderation. After the 2018 general election that saw the downfall of Najib Razak's Barisan Nasional (BN) government, Nasharudin announced the abolishment and disbandment of GMM on 30 July 2018. As of 31 July 2018, the foundation has ceased operations and is no longer active.

Nasharudin was also a fellow of Yayasan Dakwah Islamiah Malaysia (YADIM) and a member of the Council of Islamic Chinese Relations (CICR).

== Controversy ==
On 22 October 2019, Nasharudin was charged with 33 counts of criminal breach of trust (CBT) and money laundering involving RM4 million. He was slapped with 3 charges under the Anti-Money Laundering, Anti-Terrorism Financing and Proceeds of Unlawful Activities Act (Amla) for the offence of money laundering amounting to RM302,069.60. He also faces 30 other charges under Section 409 of the Penal Code for committing CBT involving RM3,721,683,80 between 2015 and 2018. Three of the CBT charges were in his capacity as CEO of GMM, while another 27 charges as chairman of Nassar Foundation. He was accused of spending public money allocated by the government for charities and for intellectual discourses meant to combat extremism on himself and his family instead; like on his son's wedding, daughter's loan, son's college fees and many more.

== Election results ==
Parliament of Malaysia
| Year | Constituency | Candidate | Votes | Pct | Opponent(s) | Votes | Pct | Ballots cast | Majority | Turnout |
|---|---|---|---|---|---|---|---|---|---|---|
| 1999 | P012 Yan | Nasharudin Mat Isa (PAS) | 16,041 | 50.29% | Badruddin Amiruldin (UMNO) | 15,859 | 49.71% | 32,428 | 182 | 76.70% |
| 2004 | P033 Besut | Nasharudin Mat Isa (PAS) | 17,587 | 40.27% | Abdullah Md Zin (UMNO) | 26,087 | 59.73% | 44,357 | 8,500 | 86.49% |
| 2008 | P025 Bachok | Nasharudin Mat Isa (PAS) | 28,835 | 52.65% | Awang Adek Hussin (UMNO) | 25,934 | 47.35% | 55,724 | 2,901 | 85.98% |

== Honours ==
- Pahang
  - Knight Companion of the Order of the Crown of Pahang (DIMP) – Dato' (2015)
