= Kagat =

KAGAT or kagat refers to:

- Kor Agama Angkatan Tentera (KAGAT), a Muslim chaplain service of the Malaysian Army
- Kagat, a cultivar of Karuka
