= Bunting Island =

Island in Yan, Malaysia

Native name: Pulau Bunting
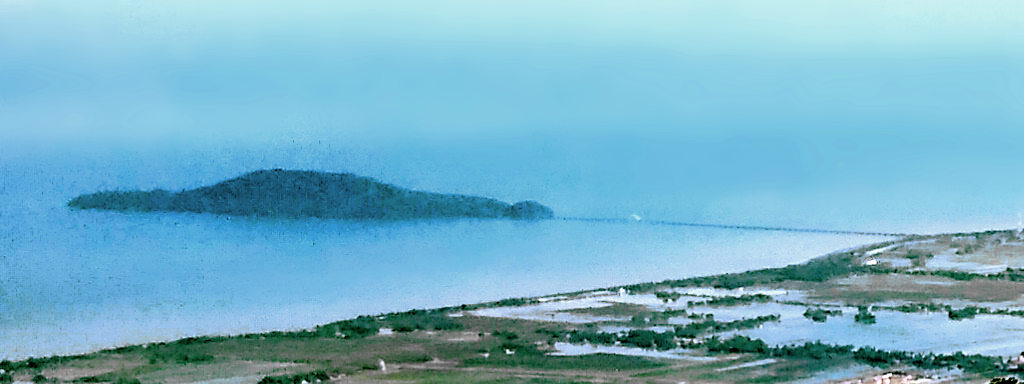
- View of Bunting Island and the Bunting Island Bridge from Mount Jerai
- Interactive map of Bunting Island

Geography
- Location: Strait of Malacca
- Coordinates: 5°53′N 100°20′E
- Area: 0.98 km^{2} (0.38 sq mi)

Administration
- Malaysia
- State: Kedah
- District: Yan
- Mukim: Sungai Daun

Bunting Island (Malay: Pulau Bunting) is the northernmost in a row of islands off Yan District in Kedah, Malaysia. It is also the only one to be linked to the mainland by a bridge. The Bunting Island Bridge connects it to the mainland.

== See also ==
- List of islands of Malaysia
