= Mohd Firdaus Jaafar =

Malaysian politician

Ustaz Mohd Firdaus Jaafar AMK BKM
- محمد فردوس جعفر

Member of the Malaysian Parliament for Jerai
- In office 8 March 2008 – 5 May 2013
- Preceded by: Badruddin Amiruldin (BN–UMNO)
- Succeeded by: Jamil Khir Baharom (BN–UMNO)
- Majority: 2,299 (2008)

Personal details
- Born: 15 March 1974 (age 52) Kedah, Malaysia
- Party: Malaysian Islamic Party (PAS) (until 2016); National Trust Party (AMANAH) (2016–present)
- Other political affiliations: Pakatan Rakyat (PR) (2008–2015); Pakatan Harapan (PH) (2016–present)
- Spouse(s): 1. Kasmuri Jaafar; 2. Nurul Huda Arshad (divorced); 3. Siti Balkis Husain
- Occupation: Politician, Ustaz
- Website: pkwrjerai.blogspot.my mohd-firdaus-jaafar.blogspot.com

Mohd Firdaus Jaafar (born 15 March 1974) is a Malaysian politician of Parti Amanah Negara (AMANAH), a component party of Pakatan Harapan (PH) coalition. He was the Member of Parliament of Malaysia for the Jerai constituency in Kedah for one term from 2008 to 2013. He was a member of Pan-Malaysian Islamic Party (PAS) before joining AMANAH in 2016. Firdaus was elected to the Jerai seat in the 2008 election, defeating incumbent Badruddin Amiruldin of the ruling Barisan Nasional (BN) coalition. Prior to the election, Firdaus was a religious teacher (Malay: Ustaz). He was defeated in the 2013 election by BN's Jamil Khir Baharom.

== Election results ==
Parliament of Malaysia
| Year | Constituency | Candidate | Votes | Pct | Opponent(s) | Votes | Pct | Ballots cast | Majority | Turnout |
|---|---|---|---|---|---|---|---|---|---|---|
| 2008 | P012 Jerai | Mohd Firdaus Jaafar (PAS) | 26,510 | 52.27% | Badruddin Amiruldin (UMNO) | 24,211 | 47.73% | 51,913 | 2,299 | 78.97% |
| 2013 | P012 Jerai | Mohd Firdaus Jaafar (PAS) | 31,233 | 49.06% | Jamil Khir Baharom (UMNO) | 32,429 | 50.94% | 64,778 | 1,196 | 87.06% |

Kedah State Legislative Assembly
| Year | Constituency | Candidate | Votes | Pct | Opponent(s) | Votes | Pct | Ballots cast | Majority | Turnout |
|---|---|---|---|---|---|---|---|---|---|---|
| 2018 | N18 Tokai | Mohd Firdaus Jaafar (AMANAH) | 6,632 | 21.97% | Mohd Hayati Othman (PAS) | 15,941 | 52.33% | 30,895 | 8,049 | 85.19% |
| 2018 | N18 Tokai | Mohd Firdaus Jaafar (AMANAH) | 6,632 | 21.97% | Fatahi Omar (UMNO) | 7,892 | 25.91% | 30,895 | 8,049 | 85.19% |

== Honours ==
- Kedah
  - Member of the Order of the Crown of Kedah (AMK) (2013)
  - Recipient of the Public Service Star (BKM) (2009)

== See also ==
- Jerai (federal constituency)
