= Yan (federal constituency) =

Malaysian federal constitutency

Kedah constituency

Defunct federal constituency
- Legislature: Dewan Rakyat
- Constituency created: 1994
- Constituency abolished: 2004
- First contested: 1995
- Last contested: 1999

Yan was a federal constituency in Kedah, Malaysia, that was represented in the Dewan Rakyat from 1995 to 2004.

The federal constituency was created in the 1994 redistribution and was mandated to return a single member to the Dewan Rakyat under the first past the post voting system.

== History ==
It was abolished in 2004 when it was redistributed.

=== Representation history ===
Members of Parliament for Yan
| Parliament | No | Years | Member | Party | Vote Share |
Constituency created, renamed from Jerai
| 9th | P012 | 1995–1999 | Badruddin Amiruldin (بدرالدين أميرالدين) | BN (UMNO) | 16,041; 50.29% |
| 10th | P012 | 1999–2004 | Nasharudin Mat Isa (نصرالدين مت عيسى) | BA (PAS) | 16,755; 57.45% |
Constituency abolished, renamed to Jerai

=== State constituency ===
| Parliamentary constituency | State constituency | | | | | | |
| Parliamentary constituency | 1955–1959* | 1959–1974 | 1974–1986 | 1986–1995 | 1995–2004 | 2004–2018 | 2018–present |
|---|---|---|---|---|---|---|---|
| Yan | | | | | Guar Chempedak | | |
| Yan | | | | | Sala | | |

=== Historical boundaries ===
| State Constituency | Area |
| State Constituency | 1995–2004 |
|---|---|
| Guar Chempedak | Guar Chempedak; Kampung Batu 18; Ruat; Singkir; Yan |
| Sala | Bukit Besar; Dulang; Permatang Buluh; Sedaka; Sungai Limau |

== Election results ==
Malaysian general election, 1999
| Party | Candidate | Votes | % | ∆% |
|---|---|---|---|---|
| PAS | Nasharudin Mat Isa | 16,041 | 50.29 | ▲7.74 |
| BN | Badruddin Amiruldin | 15,859 | 49.71 | ▼7.74 |
| Total valid votes | | 31,900 | 100.00 | |
| Total rejected ballots | | 513 | | |
| Unreturned ballots | | 15 | | |
| Turnout | | 32,428 | 76.70 | ▲2.03 |
| Registered electors | | 42,279 | | |
| Majority | | 182 | 0.58 | ▼14.32 |
| PAS gain from BN | | Swing | | ? |

Malaysian general election, 1995
| Party | Candidate | Votes | % |
|---|---|---|---|
| BN | Badruddin Amiruldin | 16,755 | 57.45 |
| PAS | Mohd Najib Fahami Yahaya | 12,412 | 42.55 |
| Total valid votes | | 29,167 | 100.00 |
| Total rejected ballots | | 874 | |
| Unreturned ballots | | 74 | |
| Turnout | | 30,115 | 74.07 |
| Registered electors | | 40,657 | |
| Majority | | 4,343 | 14.90 |
This was a new constituency created.
