= Badruddin Amiruldin =

Malaysian politician

Yang Berbahagia Tan Sri Dato' Paduka Haji Badruddin Amiruldin PSM DHMS DSDK JP
- بدرالدين أميرالدين

Permanent Chairman of UMNO
- Incumbent
- Assumed office 5 November 2007
- Preceded by: Onn Ismail

Faction represented in Dewan Rakyat
- 1992–1999: Barisan Nasional
- 2004–2008: Barisan Nasional

Other roles
- 2008–2018: Chairman of Federal Agricultural Marketing Authority (FAMA)

Personal details
- Born: 20 May 1951 (age 75) Kedah, Federation of Malaya
- Citizenship: Malaysia
- Party: United Malays National Organisation (UMNO)
- Other political affiliations: Barisan Nasional (BN)
- Occupation: Politician

Badruddin bin Amiruldin (born 20 May 1951) is a Malaysian politician. He is currently the Permanent Chairman of the United Malays National Organisation (UMNO), the largest Malay political party in the country and the leader of the Barisan Nasional (BN) coalition. Badruddin was also, until his defeat in the March 2008 General Elections, the Member of Parliament for the constituency of Jerai, Kedah in the lower house of Parliament, the Dewan Rakyat.

== Early political life ==
Badruddin was not a very well known politician in the early 1990s and started as a backbencher in Parliament, when he made his electoral debut in the 1992 Jerai by-election and get elected the first time as the Member of Parliament for the constituency of Jerai before it was abolished in 1995. Badruddin then contested and won the constituency of Yan, Kedah in the 1995 general election but he was defeated in the 1999 general election to Nasharudin bin Mat Isa from (PAS), losing by 182 votes.

== Rise to prominence ==
In the 2004 general election, Badruddin ran for the new re-created Jerai constituency and managed to elected to represent the seat again for second time under the UMNO ticket. He defeated his opponent, Che Din bin Arshad from PAS, with a majority of 10,405. Later that same year, he was elected as the Deputy Permanent Chairman of UMNO with 1,510 delegates voting for him.

== Electoral defeat in 2008 ==
In the 12th general election on 8 March 2008, Badruddin failed to retain his Jerai seat and lost to a newcomer from PAS, Mohd Firdaus Jaafar by a majority of 2,299 votes.

== Election results ==
Parliament of Malaysia
Year	Constituency	Candidate	Votes	Pct	Opponent(s)	Votes	Pct	Ballots cast	Majority	Turnout
1992	P010 Jerai	Badruddin Amiruldin (UMNO)	14,538	57.35%	Nasir Othman (PAS)	10,812	42.65%	Unknown	3,726	Unknown
1995	P012 Yan	Badruddin Amiruldin (UMNO)	16,755	57.45%	Mohd Najib Fahami Yahaya (PAS)	12,412	42.55%	30,115	4,343	74.07%
1999	P012 Yan	Badruddin Amiruldin (UMNO)	15,859	49.71%	Nasharudin Mat Isa (PAS)	16,041	50.29%	32,428	182	76.70%
2004	P012 Jerai	Badruddin Amiruldin (UMNO)	30,154	60.43%	Che Din Arshad (PAS)	19,749	39.57%	50,918	10,405	79.70%
2008	P012 Jerai	Badruddin Amiruldin (UMNO)	24,211	47.73%	Mohd Firdaus Jaafar (PAS)	26,510	52.27%	51,913	2,299	78.97%

== Honours ==
=== Honours of Malaysia ===
- Malaysia
  - Commander of the Order of Loyalty to the Crown of Malaysia (PSM) – Tan Sri (2012)
- Kedah
  - Knight Commander of the Order of Loyalty to Sultan Abdul Halim Mu'adzam Shah (DHMS) – Dato' Paduka (2004)
  - Knight Companion of the Order of Loyalty to the Royal House of Kedah (DSDK) – Dato' (1996)
  - Justice of the Peace (JP) (2010)
