= Bunting Island Bridge =

Bunting Island Bridge Jambatan Pulau Bunting جمبتن ڤولاو بونتيڠ
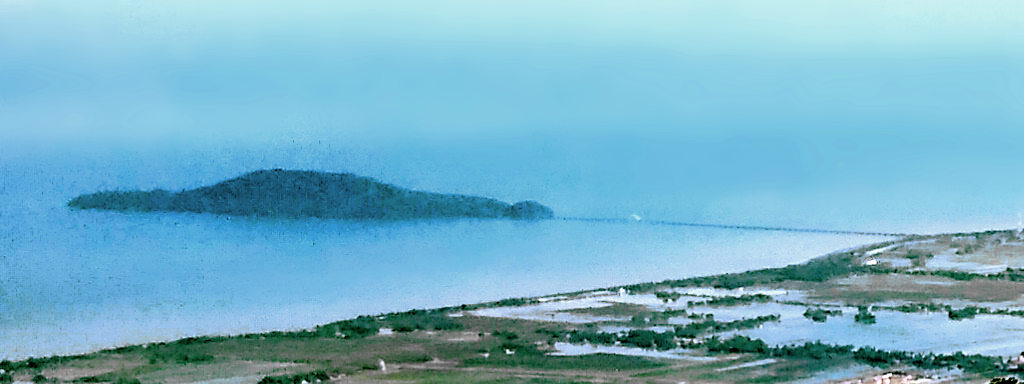
- View from Mount Jerai of Bunting Island Bridge connecting Bunting Island with Yan District
- Coordinates: 5°52′44″N 100°20′46″E
- Carries: Motor vehicles, Pedestrians
- Crosses: Straits of Malacca
- Locale: Jalan Jambatan Pulau Bunting, Yan
- Official name: Bunting Island Bridge
- Maintained by: Malaysian Public Works Department (JKR) Yan

Characteristics
- Design: tied arch bridge
- Total length: 2.3km
- Width: 13m
- Longest span: 80m

History
- Designer: Malaysian Public Works Department (JKR); Gamuda Berhad
- Constructed by: Gamuda Berhad
- Opened: 2005

Location
- Interactive map of Bunting Island Bridge

Bunting Island Bridge is a bridge that connects Bunting Island to mainland Yan, Kedah state, Malaysia. The bridge was built by the Malaysian Public Works Department (JKR) while the main contractor was Gamuda Berhad.

== History ==
It was constructed between 2002 and 2005.

The bridge remains underused and has become a white elephant project. As Bunting Island is uninhabited, the project has been widely criticised for serving no purpose while incurring a cost of RM 120 million.

The disenchantment of the locals remains unknown to the rest of the country.

== Features ==
It is a 2.3-kilometre-long (1.4 mi) × 13.0-metre-wide (42.7 ft) sea crossing consisting of a 1.8-kilometre-long (1.1 mi) bridge, a 0.1-kilometre-long (0.062 mi) causeway connecting Bunting Island to the bridge and a 0.4-kilometre-long (0.25 mi) causeway connecting mainland Kedah to the bridge. The bridge is an arch cable-stayed bridge with a main suspended span of 80 m in length and approach spans of precast concrete box beams with spans of 30 m in length. The causeways have fill embankments on piled foundations with rock armouring.

== See also ==
- Bridge to nowhere
- Unused highway
- White elephant
