= Sabri Azit =

Malaysian politician

Yang Berhormat Tuan Sabri Azit JSM SDK PJK MP
- صبري أزيد

Faction represented in Dewan Rakyat
- 2018–2020: Malaysian Islamic Party
- 2020–: Perikatan Nasional

Other roles
- 2020–2023: Chairman of Malaysian Institute of Translation and Books

Personal details
- Born: Sabri bin Azit; 4 April 1966 (age 60) Guar Chempedak, Kedah, Malaysia
- Party: Malaysian Islamic Party (PAS)
- Other political affiliations: Perikatan Nasional (PN)
- Education: University Malaya
- Occupation: Politician, teacher

Sabri bin Azit is a Malaysian politician who has served as Member of Parliament (MP) for Jerai since May 2018 and Chairman of the Translation and Book Institute from 2020 to 2023. He is a member of the Malaysian Islamic Party (PAS), a component party of the Perikatan Nasional (PN) coalition.

== Election results ==
Parliament of Malaysia
Year	Constituency	Candidate	Votes	Pct	Opponent(s)	Votes	Pct	Ballots cast	Majority	Turnout
2018	P012 Jerai	Sabri Azit (PAS)	22,312	33.94%	Jamil Khir Baharom (UMNO)	21,773	33.12%	66,748	539	83.68%
2018	P012 Jerai	Sabri Azit (PAS)	22,312	33.94%	Akhramsyah Muammar Ubaidah Sanusi (BERSATU)	21,651	32.94%	66,748	539	83.68%
2022	P012 Jerai	Sabri Azit (PAS)	49,461	60.10%	Jamil Khir Baharom (UMNO)	16,269	19.77%	82,293	33,192	78.37%
2022	P012 Jerai	Sabri Azit (PAS)	49,461	60.10%	Zulhazmi Shariff (DAP)	15,590	18.94%	82,293	33,192	78.37%
2022	P012 Jerai	Sabri Azit (PAS)	49,461	60.10%	Mohd Nizam Mahsyar (PEJUANG)	973	1.18%	82,293	33,192	78.37%

== Honours ==
=== Honours of Malaysia ===
- Malaysia
  - Companion of the Order of Loyalty to the Crown of Malaysia (JSM) (2021)
  - Recipient of the 17th Yang di-Pertuan Agong Installation Medal (2024)
- Kedah
  - Companion of the Order of Loyalty to the Royal House of Kedah (SDK) (2023)
  - Recipient of the Meritorious Service Medal (PJK) (2012)
