= Kor Agama Angkatan Tentera =

Armed Forces' Religious Corps
- Kor Agama Angkatan Tentera
- Active: 16 April 1985 (Official)
- Country: Malaysia
- Branch: Malaysian Army
- Type: Religious chaplain
- Part of: Malaysian Armed Forces
- Nickname: KAGAT

Commanders
- Director: Major General Mohd Rashidi Bin Bujai

The Military Religious Corps (Malay: Kor Agama Angkatan Tentera, KAGAT) is a Muslim chaplain service of the Malaysian Army.

== History ==
Kor Agama Angkatan Tentera (KAGAT) was officially formed on 19 April 1985, as the 16th corps of the Malaysian Army. Unique among corps of the Malaysian Army, KAGAT is a joint service formation serving all the serving men and women of the Malaysian Armed Forces, and not limited to the just the Malaysian Army, whether be Muslim or Christian alike.

Initiatives for the formation of KAGAT was moved in 1979, and the Armed Forces Council agreed to the formation of the corps in their 197th Meeting on 24 January 1980. In March 1986, the Armed Forces Council approved the terms of transfer of the Islamic Religious Affairs officers from the Public Service Department to the newly founded KAGAT as Muslim chaplains.

The first Director of the KAGAT was The Late Brigadier General Tan Sri Dato' Seri Haji Abdul Hamid Zainal Abidin.

== Organisation ==
There is no specific and formal field formations for KAGAT, rather members of the corps are distributed throughout all three services of the Malaysian Armed Forces. The most senior officer is the Director of the corps who holds the rank of a Brigadier General or Major General.

Below are the list of the Director of the Corps throughout the years:

- Late BGen Tan Sri Dato' Seri Haji Abdul Hamid Bin Zainal Abidin (6 April 1985 - 30 June 1995)
- BGen Dato' Haji Najmi Bin Haji Ahmad (1 July 1995 - 4 March 2006)
- Maj Gen Dato' Hj Jamil Khir Baharom (5 March 2006 - 8 April 2009)
- BGen Dato' Hj Mustafa Bin Haji Abdul Manap (9 April 2009 - 28 January 2014)
- Maj Gen Dato' Haji Kamarudin Bin Haji Mamat (29 January 2014 – 2021)
- Maj Gen Dato' Haji Nawawi bin Haji Daud (2020–2021)
- Maj Gen Hj Mohd Azmi bin Wahab (2021–2022)
- Maj Gen Hj Mohd Rashidi bin Bujai (2022–Present)

== Roles ==
- Plan, co-ordinate and implement dakwah programs for all members of the Armed Forces.
- teach and propagate Islamic knowledge with emphasis on high morals, positive attitudes, esprit de corps and give a better understanding on the role on the Armed Forces from an Islamic and Christian perspective of thinking.
- Implement and enforce laws and rules pertaining to Islamic Administration as ruled by the various state authorities and the Federal Government in the case of Kuala Lumpur, Putrajaya and Labuan.
- Assist in boosting morale among soldiers of the Malaysian Armed Forces at large, regardless of race, language and religion.
