= Mount Jerai =

Mountain in Kedah, Malaysia

Coordinates: 5°47′N 100°26′E

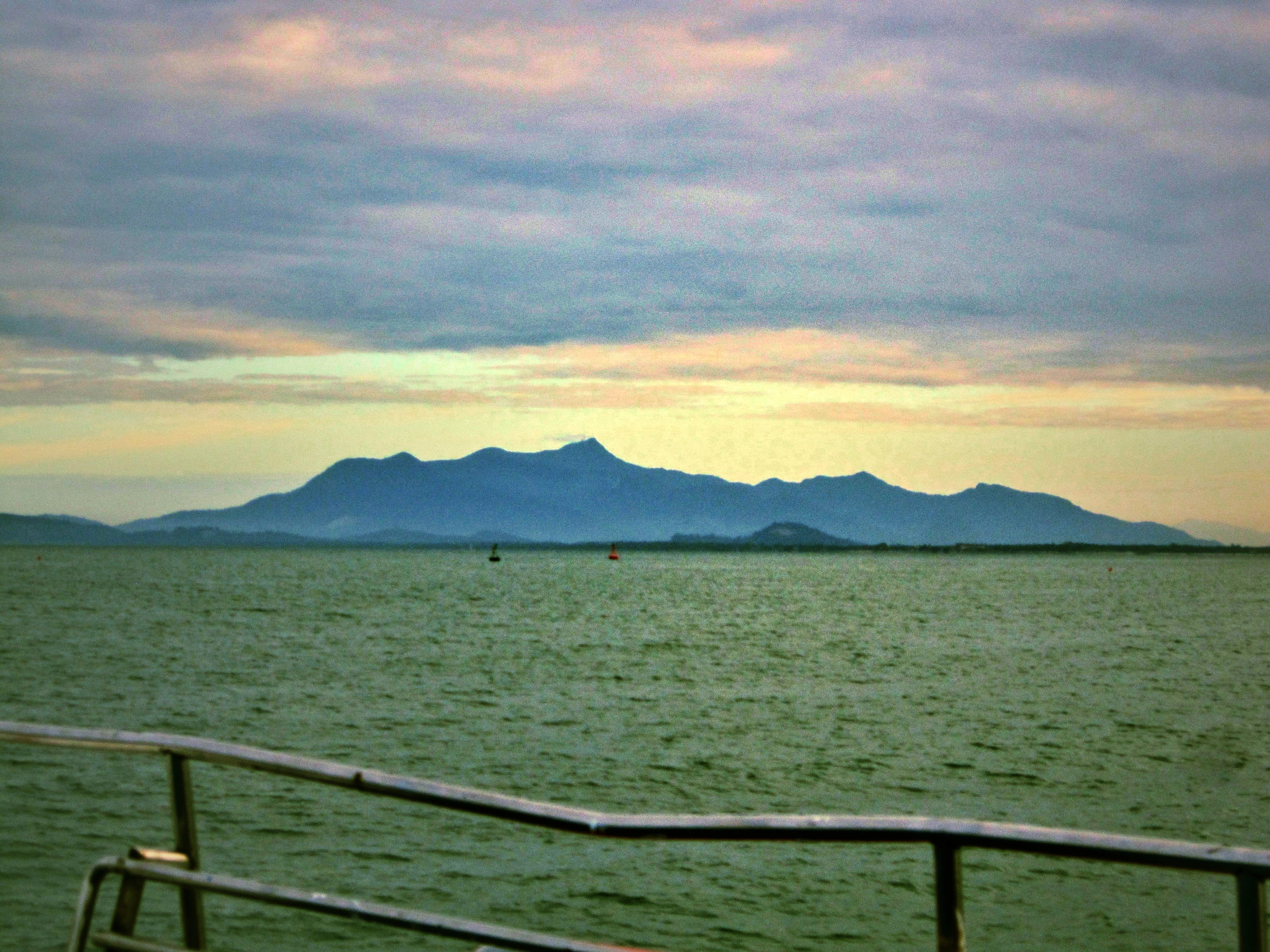
- Mount Jerai, seen from the Strait of Malacca on a ferry between Penang and Langkawi

Highest point
- Elevation: 1,217 m (3,993 ft)
- Prominence: 1,184 m (3,885 ft)
- Listing: Ribu

Naming
- Native name: Gunung Jerai (Malay)

Geography
- Location within Malaysia
- Location: Kuala Muda and Yan Districts, Kedah
- Country: Malaysia
- State: Kedah

Geology
- Mountain type: Inselberg

Climbing
- First ascent: local Kedahans

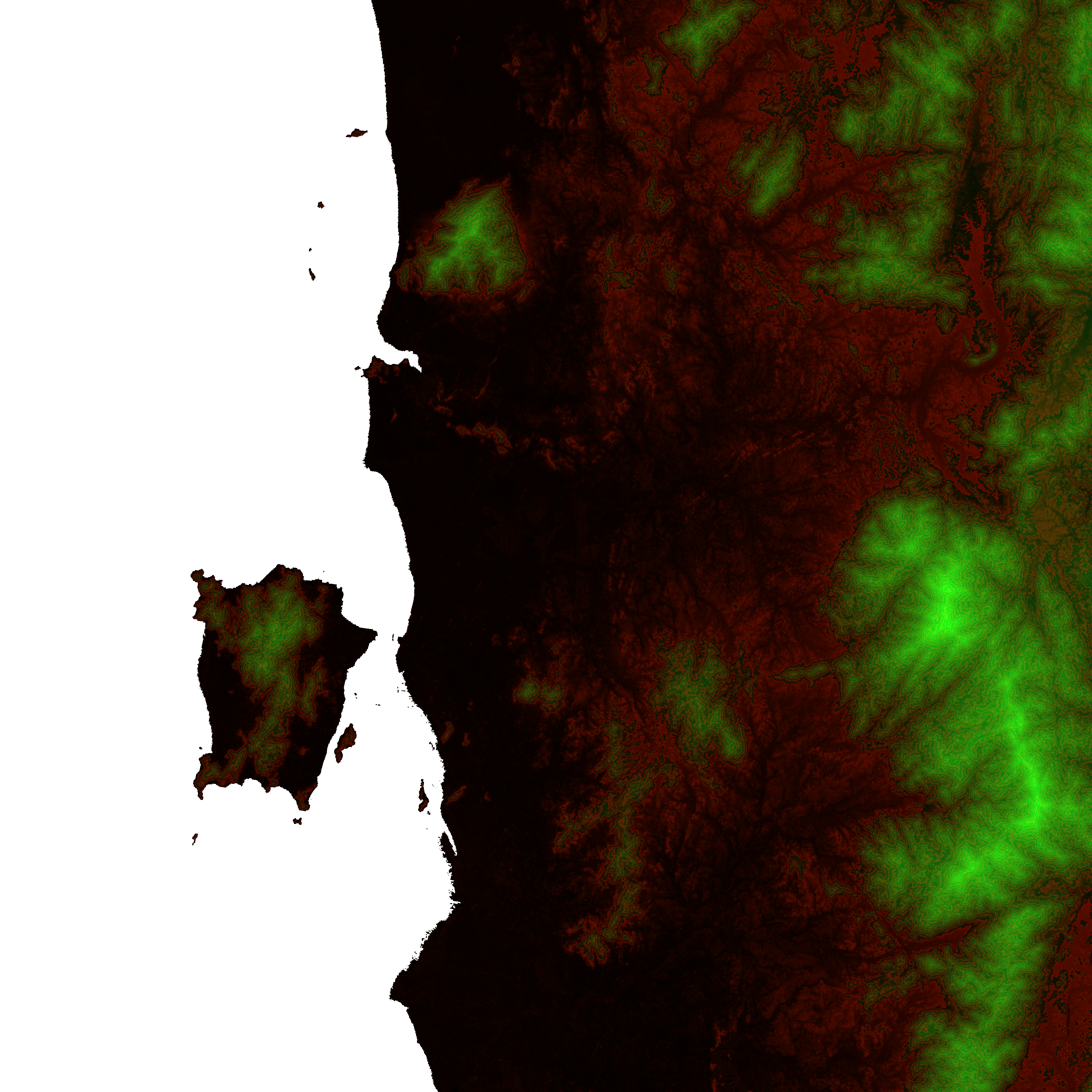
A height map of Penang and southern Kedah, with Jerai being the isolated greenish triangle near the coast

Mount Jerai (Malay: Gunung Jerai), formerly Kedah (or Quedah) Peak, is a mountain in Kedah, Malaysia with the height of 3,993 feet (1,217 m). Within Kedah itself, the mountain stands at the border of Kuala Muda and Yan districts.

Mount Jerai is known as the Hausberg of the town of Sungai Petani, the district capital of Kuala Muda.

== Legend ==
The peak was told to form as result of a curse cast upon one Śrī Balavatī (Sanskrit: श्रीबलवती), the name Jerai may have come from a rare variant of honorific seri both from Sanskrit श्री Śrī.

== Geology ==
Mount Jerai is a 1,217- metre tall inselberg located near the coast of the Strait of Malacca, and is part of an eponymous geological formation that correlates with the Matchinchang Formation in the island of Langkawi. The Jerai Formation is originally a sedimentary formation composed of fully metamorphosed sandstone and shale, and it consists of argillite, arenite and porphyry facies.

=== Insular origins ===
There is an information board on top of the mountain stating that it used to be an island called Pulai Serai before the sea levels receded letting it form a mountain. This is probably supported by I Ching's record of Pu Lou Shi (Pulau Sri), a country located west of Sribogha.

== Tourism ==
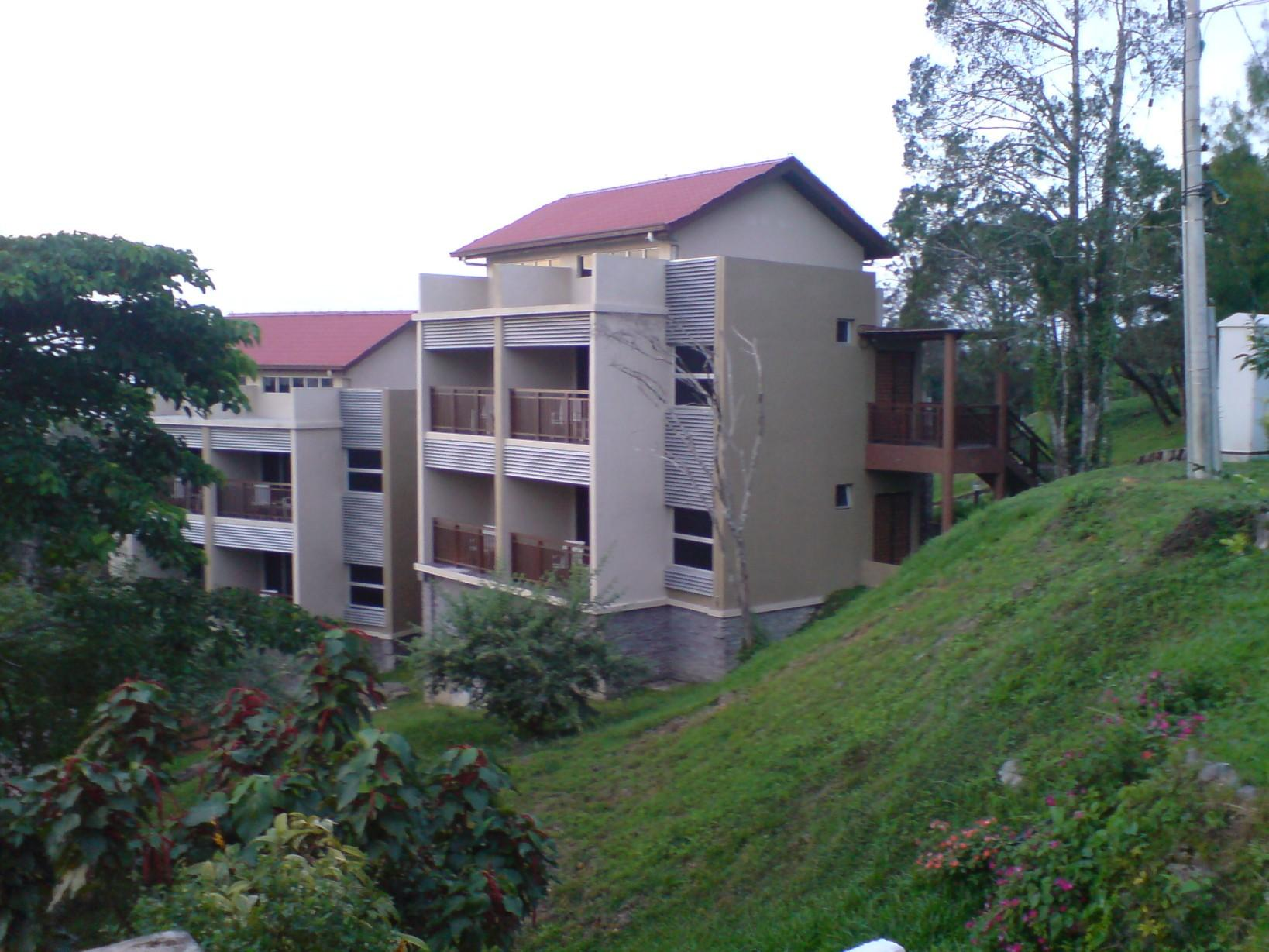
A resort on Jerai summit

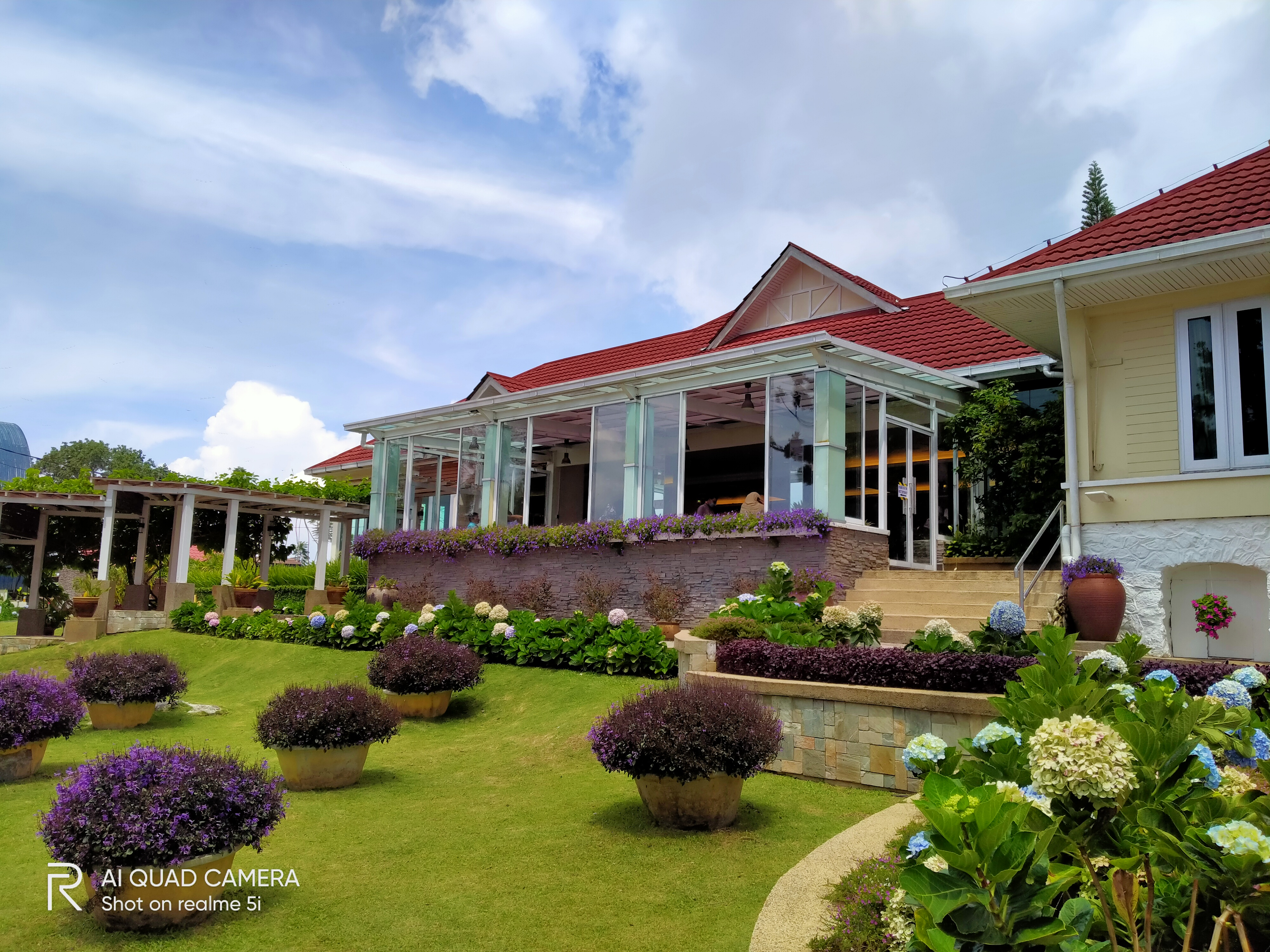
Jerai Hill Resort

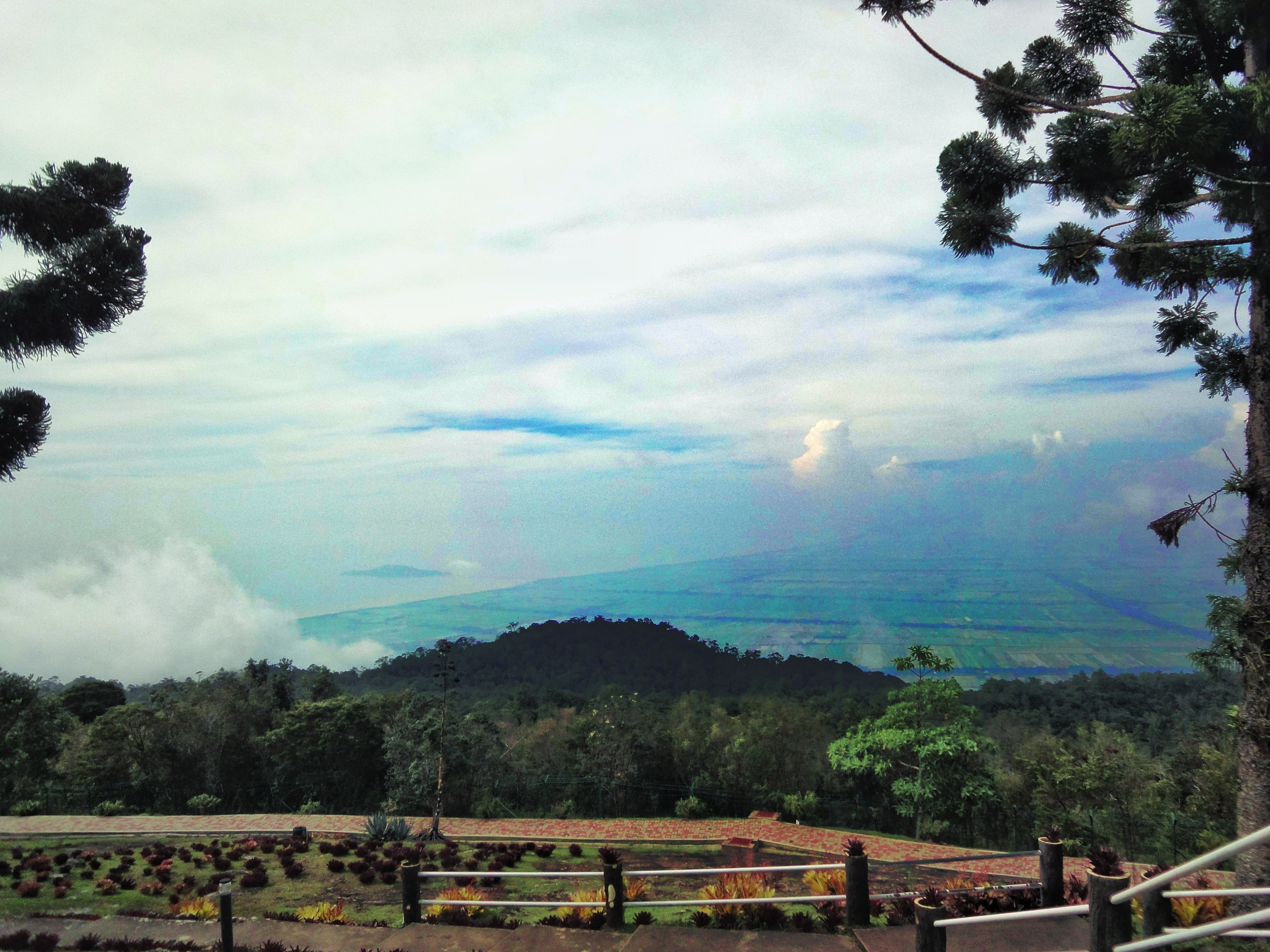
View of Yan side. The paddy fields and the coast of Strait of Malacca are barely visible due to hazy conditions.

The summit of Jerai has been developed into a hill resort, and from there tourists can get to enjoy a wide angle view of the surrounding areas, including Penang Island and the rice fields of Yan District.

== Gallery ==
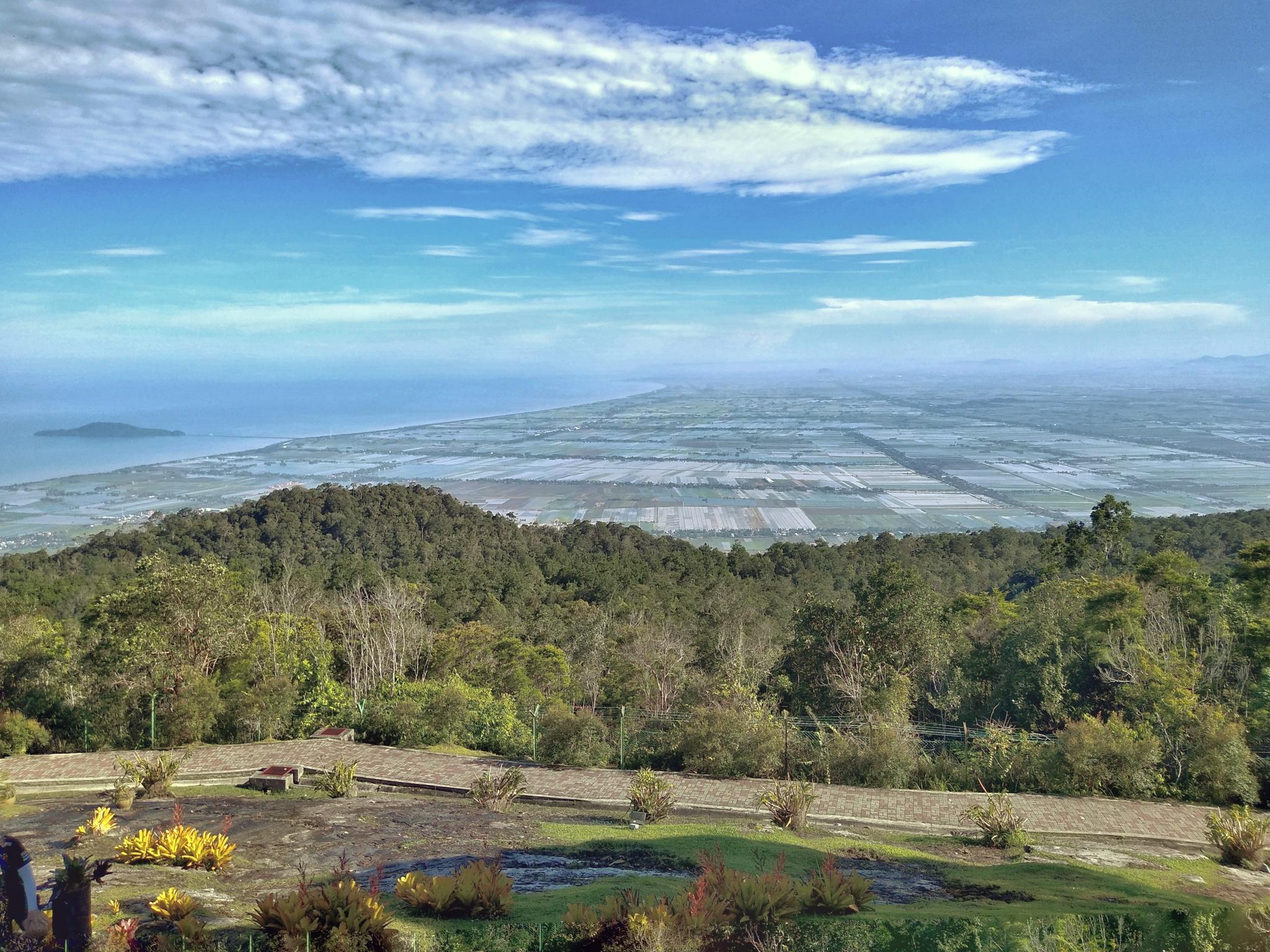
View to the north with Bunting Island and the Bunting Island Bridge from the Jerai Hill Resort.

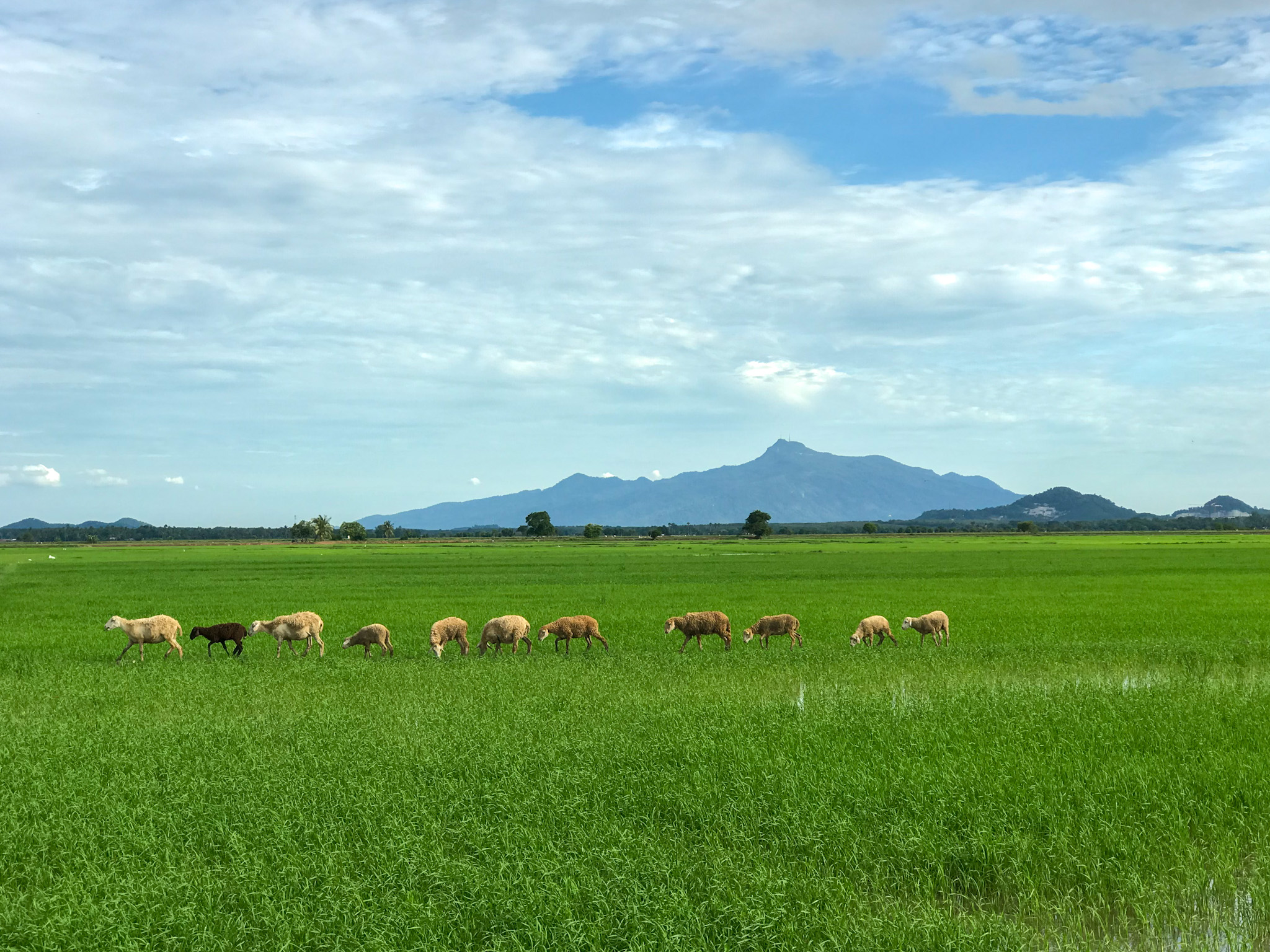
Mount Jerai towers over a paddy field.

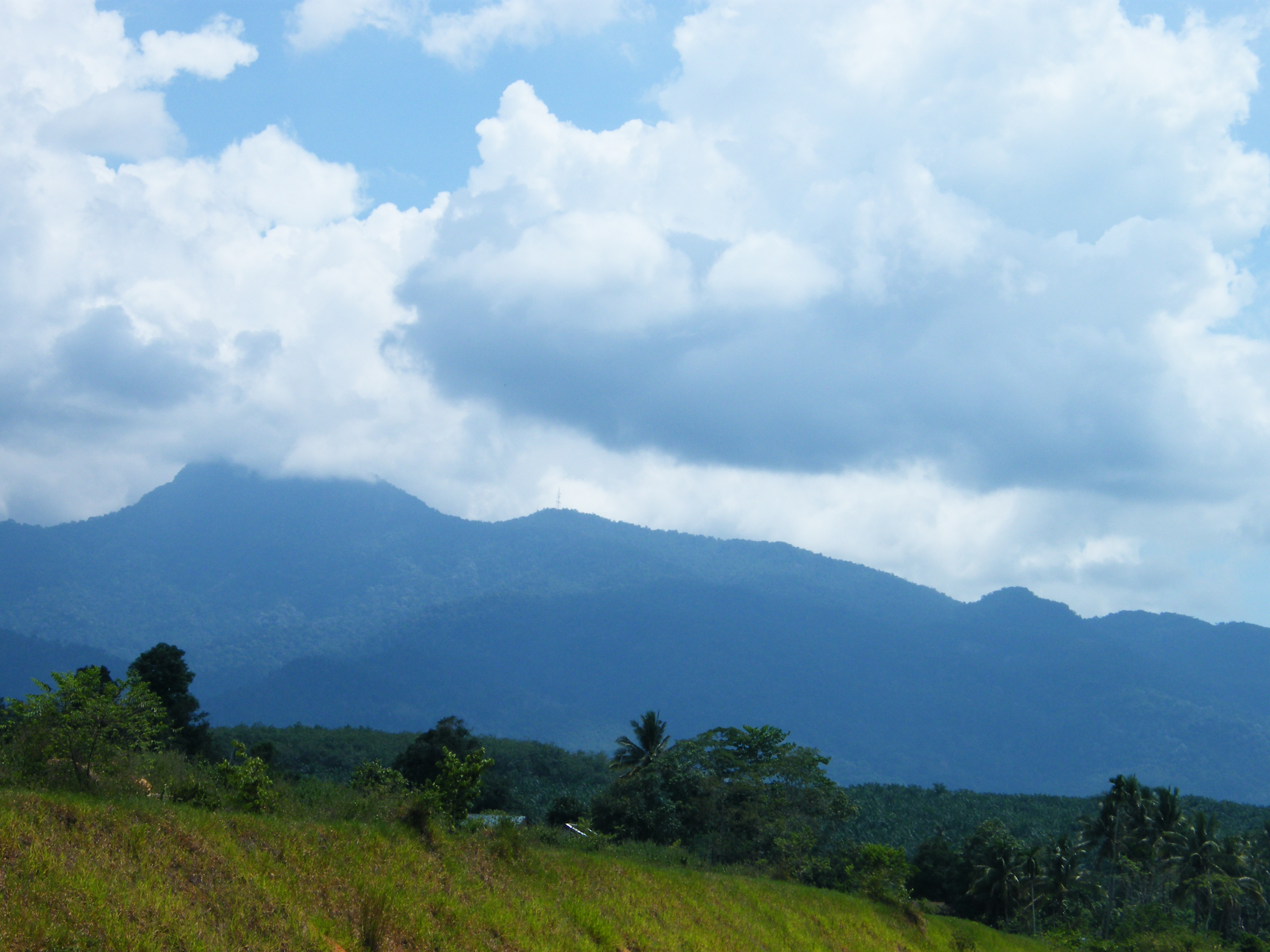
East face of Jerai, viewed from Gurun.

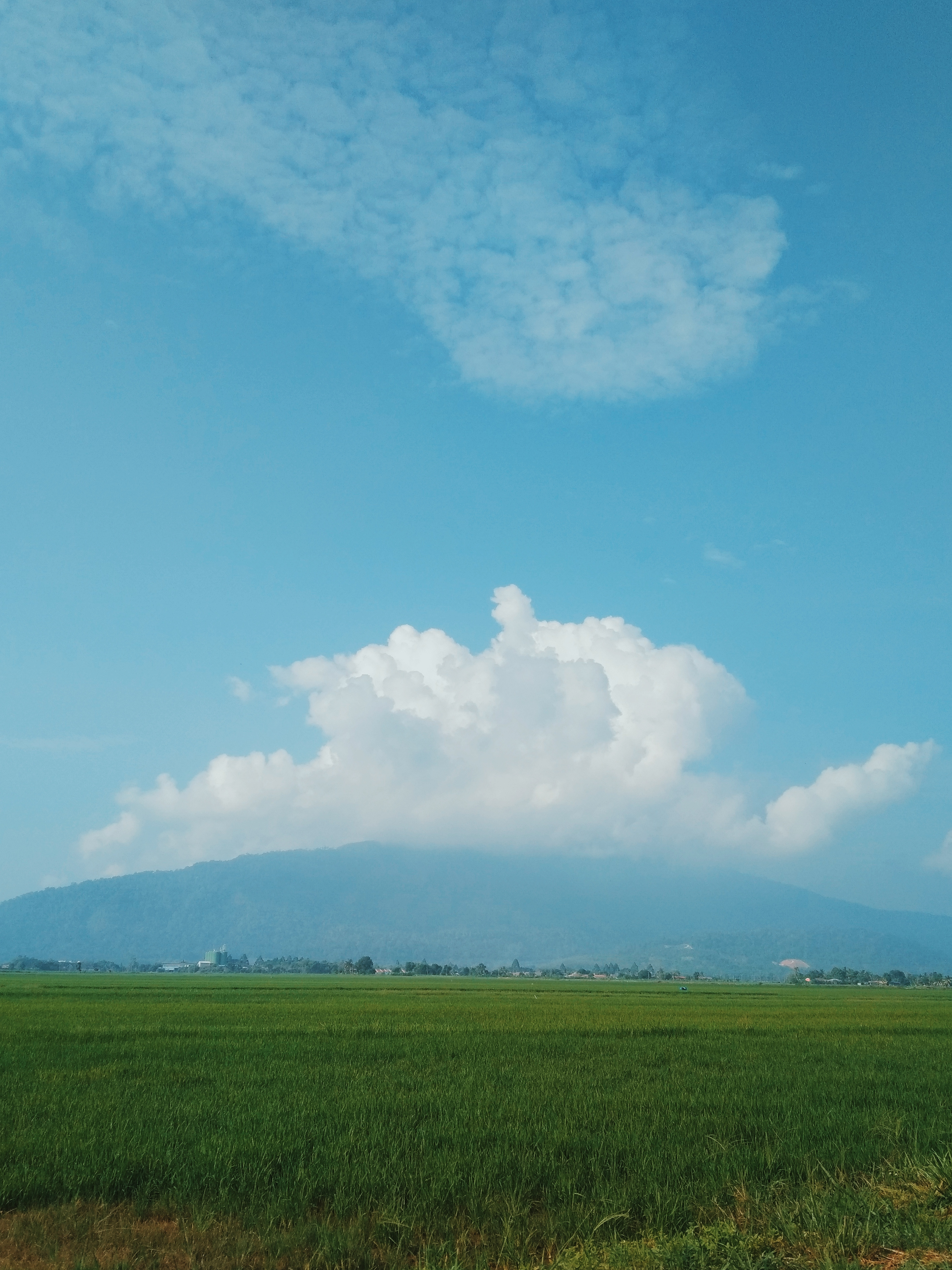
Mount Jerai, seen from Guar Chempedak.

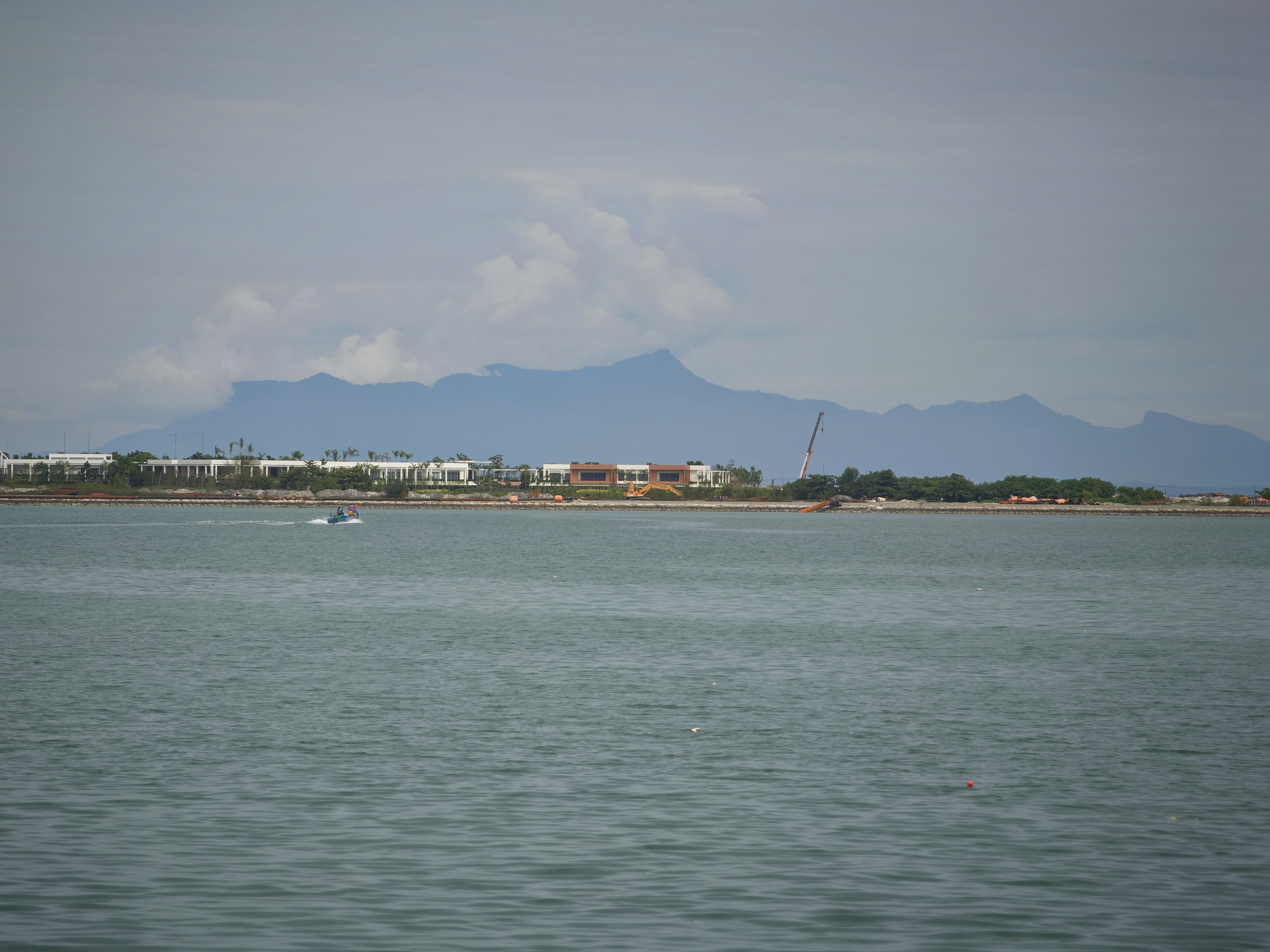
The mountain as seen from George Town, Penang, 42 km (25 mi) southwest.

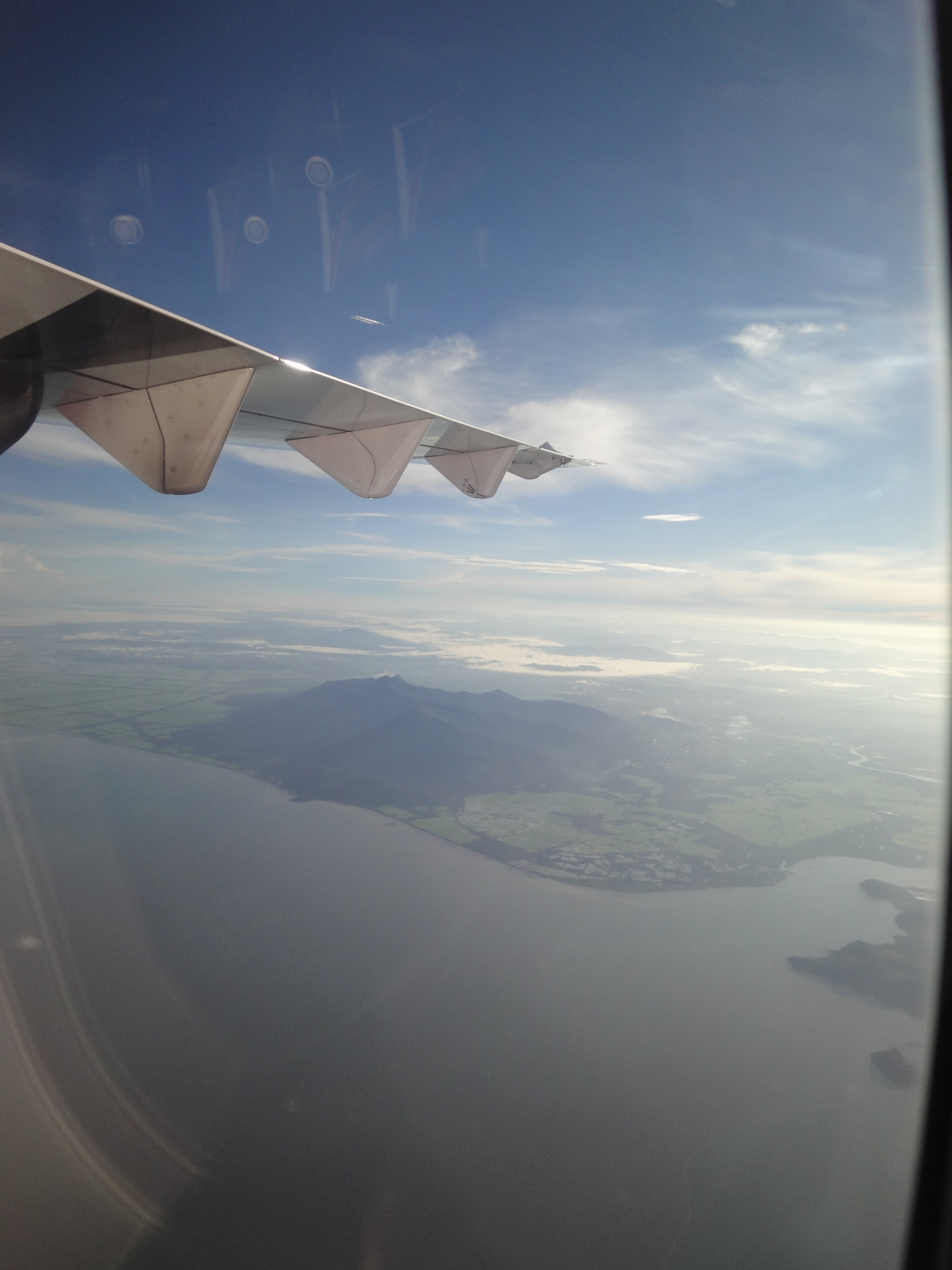
Aerial view of Jerai and Tanjung Dawai, seen from a commercial flight.

== See also ==
- List of mountains in Malaysia
- Geography of Malaysia
