= Jerai (federal constituency) =

Federal constituency of Kedah, Malaysia

Jerai (P012)
Kedah constituency

Federal constituency
- Legislature: Dewan Rakyat
- MP: Sabri Azit; PN
- Constituency created: 1958
- Constituency abolished: 1995
- Constituency re-created: 2003
- First contested: 1959
- Last contested: 2022

Demographics
- Population (2020): 126,200
- Electors (2023): 105,309
- Area (km²): 458
- Pop. density (per km²): 275.5

Jerai is a federal constituency in Yan District and Kuala Muda District, Kedah, Malaysia, that has been represented in the Dewan Rakyat since from 1959 to 1995, from 2004 to present.

The federal constituency was created in the 1958 redistribution and is mandated to return a single member to the Dewan Rakyat under the first past the post voting system.

== Demographics ==
https://live.chinapress.com.my/ge15/parliament/KEDAH

Ethnic breakdown of Jerai's electorate as of 2022
1. Malay (80.8%)
2. Chinese (13.0%)
3. Indian (5.90%)
4. Other ethnicities (0.20%)

As of 2020, Jerai has a population of 126,200 people.

Age breakdown of Jerai's electorate as of 2022
1. 18-20 (6.11%)
2. 21-29 (21.4%)
3. 30-39 (20.9%)
4. 40-49 (17.6%)
5. 50-59 (15.1%)
6. 60-69 (10.8%)
7. 70-79 (5.49%)
8. 80-89 (1.93%)
9. above 90 (0.38%)
Gender breakdown of Jerai's electorate as of 2022
1. Male (49.2%)
2. Female (50.8%)

== History ==
It was abolished in 1995 when it was redistributed. It was re-created in 2003.

=== Polling districts ===
According to the federal gazette issued on 18 July 2023, the Jerai constituency is divided into 53 polling districts.

State constituency	Polling Districts	Code	Location
Sungai Limau (N20）	Matang Buloh	012/20/01	SK Permatang Buloh
Sungai Limau (N20）	Sungai Dedap	012/20/02	SK Sungai Dedap
Sungai Limau (N20）	Gelam Tiga	012/20/03	SMA Nahdzah
Sungai Limau (N20）	Bukit Choras	012/20/04	SMA Nahdzah
Sungai Limau (N20）	Bukit Besar	012/20/05	SK Bukit Besar
Sungai Limau (N20）	Simpang Tiga Luar	012/20/06	SK Simpang Tiga Sungai Daun
Sungai Limau (N20）	Simpang Tiga	012/20/07	SJK (C) Aik Min
Sungai Limau (N20）	Selengkoh	012/20/08	SK Haji Kassim Jasin
Sungai Limau (N20）	Sungai Daun	012/20/09	SK Sungai Daun Tengah
Sungai Limau (N20）	Sungai Limau	012/20/10	SK Sungai Limau
Sungai Limau (N20）	Kabu Sepuloh	012/20/11	SMK Sungai Limau
Sungai Limau (N20）	Sungai Kering	012/20/12	SK Sungai Kering
Sungai Limau (N20）	Sedaka	012/20/13	SK Ulu Sedaka
Sungai Limau (N20）	Ulu Sedaka	012/20/14	SK Ulu Sedaka
Sungai Limau (N20）	Padang Lumat	012/20/15	SMK Batu 17
Sungai Limau (N20）	Batu Enam Belas	012/20/16	SK Padang Lumat
Sungai Limau (N20）	Kampung Titi Batu	012/20/17	SJK (C) Pei Hwa
Sungai Limau (N20）	Dulang Kechil	012/20/18	SK Dulang
Sungai Limau (N20）	Dulang Besar	012/20/19	SMK Dulang
Guar Chempedak (N21）	Pondok Haji Majid	012/21/01	SK Haji Hussin Dol
Guar Chempedak (N21）	Taman Sri Wangsa	012/21/02	SMK Guar Chempedak
Guar Chempedak (N21）	Pondok Haji Hussein	012/21/03	SK Guar Chempedak
Guar Chempedak (N21）	Titi Teras	012/21/04	SJK (C) Pei Eng
Guar Chempedak (N21）	Teroi	012/21/05	SK Teroi
Guar Chempedak (N21）	Titi Serong	012/21/06	SJK (C) Chung Hwa
Guar Chempedak (N21）	Kuala Yan Kechil	012/21/07	SMA Fauzi
Guar Chempedak (N21）	Pekan Sungai Yan	012/21/08	SK Yan Kechil
Guar Chempedak (N21）	Sungai Udang	012/21/09	SK Kampung Pauh
Guar Chempedak (N21）	Singkir Darat	012/21/10	SK Singkir
Guar Chempedak (N21）	Kampung Acheh	012/21/11	Maktab Mahmud Yan
Guar Chempedak (N21）	Lubok Buoy	012/21/12	SK Haji Nyak Gam
Guar Chempedak (N21）	Pekan Yan	012/21/13	SK Langkasuka
Guar Chempedak (N21）	Sungai Raga	012/21/14	SJK (C) York Khoon
Guar Chempedak (N21）	Ruat	012/21/15	SK Tok Mat Salleh
Guar Chempedak (N21）	Singkir Laut	012/21/16	SK Singkir
Gurun（N22）	Pekan Jeniang	012/22/01	SMK Tunku Sulong
Gurun（N22）	Kampung Jeniang	012/22/02	SK Jeniang (Pusat)
Gurun（N22）	Batu Sepuloh	012/22/03	SJK (C) Jeniang
Gurun（N22）	Batu 9	012/22/04	SK Jeniang (Pusat)
Gurun（N22）	Padang Lembu	012/22/05	SJK (C) Mah Wah Padang Lembu
Gurun（N22）	Sungai Rotan	012/22/06	SJK (C) Yang Kao
Gurun（N22）	Gurun	012/22/07	SK Gurun (Pusat)
Gurun（N22）	Pulau Chengai	012/22/08	SK Gurun (Pusat)
Gurun（N22）	Bongkok Gurun	012/22/09	SK Batu Empat
Gurun（N22）	Pekan Gurun	012/22/10	SJK (C) Choong Hwa
Gurun（N22）	Pekan Baru Gurun	012/22/11	SK Sri Jerai
Gurun（N22）	Kampung Gurun	012/22/12	SMA Pekan Gurun
Gurun（N22）	Taman Seri Jerai	012/22/13	SMK Gurun
Gurun（N22）	Ladang Jerai	012/22/14	SJK (T) Ladang Harvard Bahagian I
Gurun（N22）	Sungai Puntar	012/22/15	SJK (T) Ladang Sungai Puntar
Gurun（N22）	Sungai Tok Pawang	012/22/16	SK Sungai Tok Pawang
Gurun（N22）	Kampung Mesjid	012/22/17	SK Bedong; SK Seri Aman
Gurun（N22）	Pekan Bahru Bedong	012/22/18	SMK Bedong

=== Representation history ===
Members of Parliament for Jerai
Parliament	No	Years	Member	Party	Vote Share
Constituency created from Kedah Tengah
Parliament of the Federation of Malaya
1st	P010	1959–1963	Mohamed Ismail Mohd Yusof (محمد اسماعيل محمد يوسف)	Alliance (UMNO)	11,350; 63.93%
Parliament of Malaysia
1st	P010	1963–1964	Mohamed Ismail Mohd Yusof (محمد اسماعيل محمد يوسف)	Alliance (UMNO)	11,350; 63.93%
2nd	P010	1964–1969	Hanafiah Hussain (حنفيه هوسساءين)	Alliance (UMNO)	14,002; 66.40%
		1969–1971	Parliament was suspended		
3rd	P010	1971–1973	Hanafiah Hussain (حنفيه هوسساءين)	Alliance (UMNO)	13,182; 55.87%
3rd	P010	1973–1974	Hanafiah Hussain (حنفيه هوسساءين)	BN (UMNO)	13,182; 55.87%
4th	P011	1974–1978	Sanusi Junid (سنسي جنيد)	BN (UMNO)	Uncontested
5th	P011	1978–1982	Ismail Arshad (اسماعيل ارشد)	BN (UMNO)	13,654; 56.60%
6th	P011	1982–1986	Ismail Arshad (اسماعيل ارشد)	BN (UMNO)	17,001; 61.34%
7th	P010	1986–1990	Ghazali Ahmad (غزالي احمد)	BN (UMNO)	13,636; 55.95%
8th	P010	1990–1992	Ghazali Ahmad (غزالي احمد)	BN (UMNO)	15,723; 58.57%
8th	P010	1992–1995	Badruddin Amiruldin (بدرالدين أميرالدين)	BN (UMNO)	14,538; 57.35%
Constituency abolished, renamed to Yan
Constituency re-created from Merbok and Yan
11th	P012	2004–2008	Badruddin Amiruldin (بدرالدين أميرالدين)	BN (UMNO)	30,154; 60.43%
12th	P012	2008–2013	Mohd Firdaus Jaafar (محمد فردوس جعفر)	PR (PAS)	26,510; 52.27%
13th	P012	2013–2018	Jamil Khir Baharom (جميل خير بن بهرام)	BN (UMNO)	32,429; 50.94%
14th	P012	2018–2020	Sabri Azit (صبري ازيت)	GS (PAS)	22,312; 33.94%
14th	P012	2020–2022	Sabri Azit (صبري ازيت)	PN (PAS)	22,312; 33.94%
15th	P012	2022–present	Sabri Azit (صبري ازيت)	PN (PAS)	49,461; 60.10%

=== State constituency ===
Parliamentary constituency	State constituency						
Parliamentary constituency	1955–1959*	1959–1974	1974–1986	1986–1995	1995–2004	2004–2018	2018–present
Jerai						Guar Chempedak	
Jerai						Gurun	
Jerai		Sala					
Jerai						Sungai Limau	
Jerai			Yan				
Jerai		Yen-Merbok					

=== Historical boundaries ===
State Constituency	Area				
State Constituency	1959	1974	1984	2003	2018
Guar Chempedak				Guar Chempedak; Kampung Teroi Bukit; Ruat; Singkir; Yan	
Gurun				Bedong; Gurun; Jeniang; Kampung Lombong; Padang Lembu	
Sala	Bukit Besar; Dulang; Permatang Buluh; Sedaka; Sungai Limau	Bukit Besar; Dulang; Guar Chempedak; Permatang Buluh; Sedaka	Bukit Besar; Dulang; Permatang Buluh; Sedaka; Sungai Limau		
Sungai Limau				Bukit Besar; Dulang; Permatang Buluh; Sedaka; Sungai Limau	
Yan		Gurun; Ruat; Singkir; Sungai Limau; Yan	Guar Chempedak; Kampung Teroi Bukit; Ruat; Singkir; Yan		
Yen-Merbok	Guar Chempedak; Ruat; Singkir; Tanjung Dawai; Yan				

=== Current state assembly members ===
No.	State Constituency	Member	Coalition (Party)
N20	Sungai Limau	Mohd Azam Abd Samat	PN (PAS)
N21	Guar Chempedak	Abdul Ghafar Saad	PN (BERSATU)
N22	Gurun	Baddrol Bakhtiar	PN (PAS)

=== Local governments & postcodes ===
No.	State Constituency	Local Government	Postcode
N20	Sungai Limau	Yan District Council	06800 Kota Sarang Semut; 06900, 06910 Yan; 08000 Sungai Petani; 08100, 08110 Bedong; 08300, 08880 Gurun
N21	Guar Chempedak	Yan District Council	06800 Kota Sarang Semut; 06900, 06910 Yan; 08000 Sungai Petani; 08100, 08110 Bedong; 08300, 08880 Gurun
N22	Gurun	Sungai Petani Municipal Council	06800 Kota Sarang Semut; 06900, 06910 Yan; 08000 Sungai Petani; 08100, 08110 Bedong; 08300, 08880 Gurun

== Election results ==
Malaysian general election, 2022
Party	Candidate	Votes	%	∆%
PN	Sabri Azit	49,461	60.10	▲60.10
BN	Jamil Khir Baharom	16,269	19.77	▼13.35
PH	Zulhazmi Shariff	15,590	18.94	▲18.94
PEJUANG	Mohd Nizam Mahsyar	973	1.18	▲1.18
Total valid votes		82,293	100.00	
Total rejected ballots		837		
Unreturned ballots		164		
Turnout		83,294	78.37	▼5.31
Registered electors		105,001		
Majority		33,192	40.33	▲39.51
PN hold		Swing		
Source(s) https://lom.agc.gov.my/ilims/upload/portal/akta/outputp/1753260/PUB%20606%20(2022).pdf

Malaysian general election, 2018
Party	Candidate	Votes	%	∆%
PAS	Sabri Azit	22,312	33.94	▼15.94
BN	Jamil Khir Baharom	21,773	33.12	▼17.00
PKR	Akhramsyah Muammar Ubaidah Sanusi	21,651	32.94	▲32.94
Total valid votes		65,736	100.00	
Total rejected ballots		1,012		
Unreturned ballots		172		
Turnout		66,920	83.68	▼3.38
Registered electors		79,976		
Majority		539	0.82	▼1.06
PAS gain from BN		Swing		?
Source(s) "His Majesty's Government Gazette - Notice of Contested Election, Parliament for the State of Kedah [P.U. (B) 233/2018]" (PDF). Attorney General's Chambers of Malaysia. 3 May 2018. "Federal Government Gazette - Results of Contested Election and Statements of the Poll after the Official Addition of Votes, Parliamentary Constituencies for the State of Kedah [P.U. (B) 307/2018]" (PDF). Attorney General's Chambers of Malaysia. 28 May 2018.

Malaysian general election, 2013
Party	Candidate	Votes	%	∆%
BN	Jamil Khir Baharom	32,429	50.94	▲3.21
PAS	Mohd Firdaus Jaafar	31,233	49.06	▼3.21
Total valid votes		63,662	100.00	
Total rejected ballots		952		
Unreturned ballots		164		
Turnout		64,778	87.06	▲8.09
Registered electors		74,410		
Majority		1,196	1.88	▼2.66
BN gain from PAS		Swing		?
Source(s) "Federal Government Gazette - Notice of Contested Election, Parliament for the State of Kedah [P.U. (B) 170/2013]" (PDF). Attorney General's Chambers of Malaysia. 26 April 2013. Archived from the original (PDF) on 2019-12-29. "Federal Government Gazette - Results of Contested Election and Statements of the Poll after the Official Addition of Votes, Parliamentary Constituencies for the State of Kedah [P.U. (B) 211/2013]" (PDF). Attorney General's Chambers of Malaysia. 22 May 2013.

Malaysian general election, 2008
Party	Candidate	Votes	%	∆%
PAS	Mohd Firdaus Jaafar	26,510	52.27	▲12.70
BN	Badruddin Amiruldin	24,211	47.73	▼12.70
Total valid votes		50,721	100.00	
Total rejected ballots		1,070		
Unreturned ballots		122		
Turnout		51,913	78.97	▼0.73
Registered electors		65,739		
Majority		2,299	4.54	▼16.32
PAS gain from BN		Swing		?

Malaysian general election, 2004
Party	Candidate	Votes	%	∆%
BN	Badruddin Amiruldin	30,154	60.43	
PAS	Che Din Arshad	19,749	39.57	
Total valid votes		49,903	100.00	
Total rejected ballots		1,015		
Unreturned ballots		0		
Turnout		50,918	79.70	
Registered electors		63,887		
Majority		10,405	20.86	
BN hold		Swing		

Malaysian general by-election, 4 March 1992 Upon the death of incumbent, Ghazali Ahmad
Party	Candidate	Votes	%	∆%
BN	Badruddin Amiruldin	14,538	57.35	▼1.22
PAS	Nasir Othman	10,812	42.65	▲1.22
Total valid votes		25,350	100.00	
Total rejected ballots				
Unreturned ballots				
Turnout				
Registered electors		37,171		
Majority		3,726	14.70	▼2.44
BN hold		Swing		

Malaysian general election, 1990
Party	Candidate	Votes	%	∆%
BN	Ghazali Ahmad	15,723	58.57	▲2.62
PAS	Ahmad Subki Abd. Latif @ Subky Abd. Latif	11,121	41.43	▼2.62
Total valid votes		26,844	100.00	
Total rejected ballots		620		
Unreturned ballots		0		
Turnout		27,464	73.89	▲2.20
Registered electors		37,171		
Majority		4,602	17.14	▲5.24
BN hold		Swing		

Malaysian general election, 1986
Party	Candidate	Votes	%	∆%
BN	Ghazali Ahmad	13,636	55.95	▼5.39
PAS	Nakhaie Ahmad	10,736	44.05	▲5.39
Total valid votes		24,372	100.00	
Total rejected ballots		535		
Unreturned ballots		0		
Turnout		24,907	71.69	▼5.66
Registered electors		34,741		
Majority		2,900	11.90	▼10.78
BN hold		Swing		

Malaysian general election, 1982
Party	Candidate	Votes	%	∆%
BN	Ismail Arshad	17,001	61.34	▲4.74
PAS	Ahmad Yusof	10,715	38.66	▼4.74
Total valid votes		27,716	100.00	
Total rejected ballots		871		
Unreturned ballots		0		
Turnout		28,587	77.35	
Registered electors		36,957		
Majority		6,286	22.68	▲9.48
BN hold		Swing		

Malaysian general election, 1978
Party	Candidate	Votes	%	∆%
BN	Ismail Arshad	13,654	56.60	▲56.60
PAS	Hussein Abu Bakar	10,469	43.40	▲43.40
Total valid votes		24,123	100.00	
Total rejected ballots				
Unreturned ballots				
Turnout				
Registered electors		32,536		
Majority		3,185	13.20	
BN hold		Swing		

Malaysian general election, 1974
Party	Candidate	Votes	%	∆%
On the nomination day, Sanusi Junid won uncontested.
BN	Sanusi Junid			
Total valid votes			100.00	
Total rejected ballots				
Unreturned ballots				
Turnout				
Registered electors		28,704		
Majority				
BN gain from Alliance		Swing		?

Malaysian general election, 1969
Party	Candidate	Votes	%	∆%
Alliance	Hanafiah Hussain	13,182	55.87	▼10.53
PMIP	Abdul Rashid Abdul Razak	10,414	44.13	▲10.53
Total valid votes		23,596	100.00	
Total rejected ballots		737		
Unreturned ballots		0		
Turnout		24,333	76.45	▼0.62
Registered electors		31,829		
Majority		2,768	11.74	▼21.06
Alliance hold		Swing		

Malaysian general election, 1964
Party	Candidate	Votes	%	∆%
Alliance	Hanafiah Hussain	14,002	66.40	▲2.47
PMIP	Othman Yunus	7,085	33.60	▼2.47
Total valid votes		21,087	100.00	
Total rejected ballots		701		
Unreturned ballots		0		
Turnout		21,788	77.07	▲5.04
Registered electors		28,271		
Majority		6,917	32.80	▲4.94
Alliance hold		Swing		

Malayan general election, 1959
Party	Candidate	Votes	%
Alliance	Mohamed Ismail Mohd Yusof	11,350	63.93
PMIP	Mahmood Abdullah	6,403	36.07
Total valid votes		17,753	100.00
Total rejected ballots		126	
Unreturned ballots		0	
Turnout		17,879	72.03
Registered electors		24,820	
Majority		4,947	27.86
This was a new constituency created.
