= Yan District =

- District of Kedah
- Daerah Yan
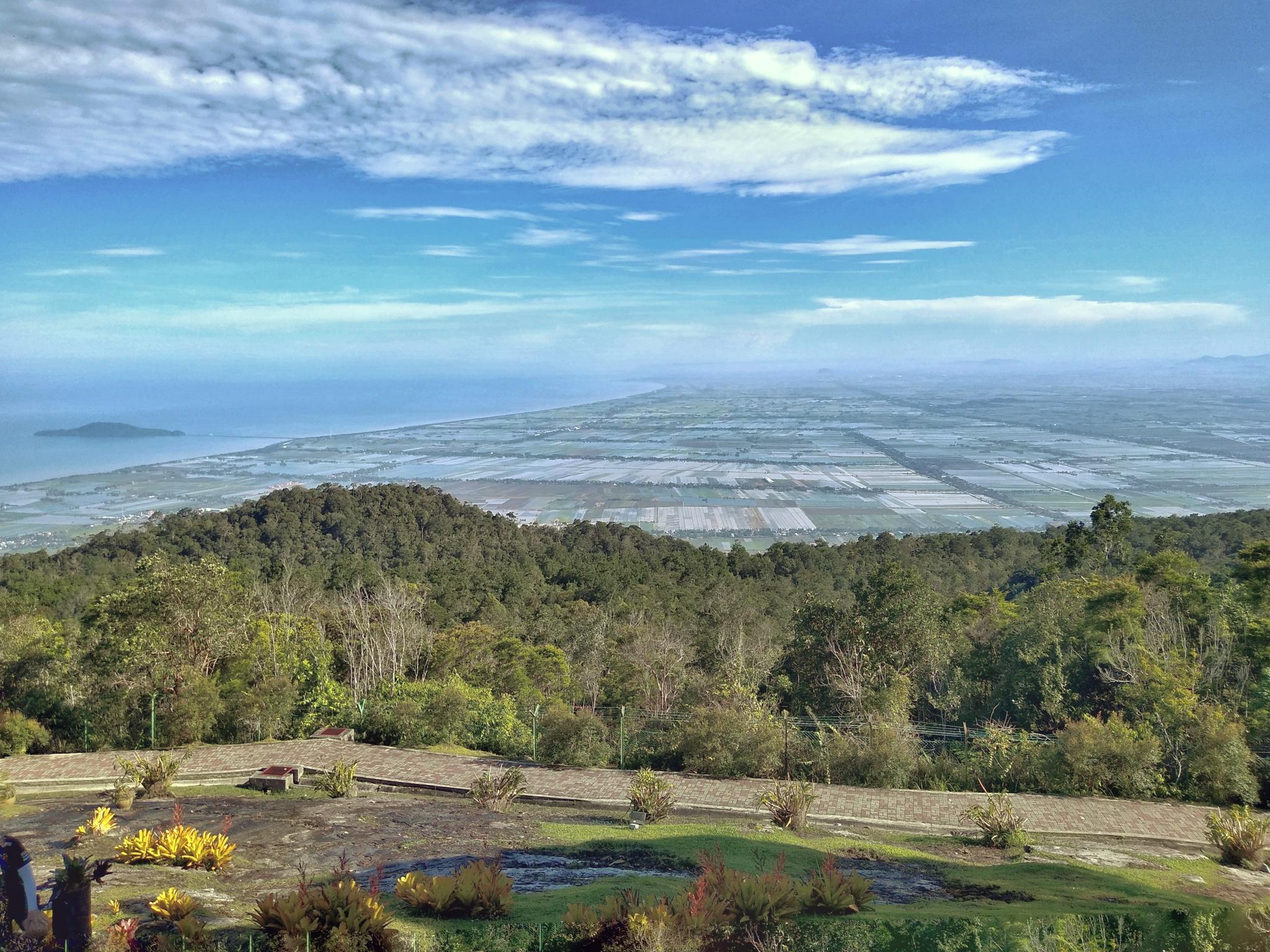
- The northern part of Yan District viewed from Mount Jerai

- Seal

- Location of Yan District in Kedah
- Interactive map of Yan District
- Location of Yan District in Malaysia
- Coordinates: 5°48′N 100°22′E
- Country: Malaysia
- State: Kedah
- Seat: Yan Besar
- Local area government(s): Yan District Council

Government
  - District officer: Puan Maznim binti Ismail

Area
  - Total: 241.78 km^{2} (93.35 sq mi)

Population (2010)
  - Total: 67,653
  - Density: 279.81/km^{2} (724.71/sq mi)
- Time zone: UTC+8 (MST)
  - Summer (DST): UTC+8 (Not observed)
- Postcode: 06xxx
- Calling code: +6-04
- Vehicle registration plates: K

Yan District Council Majlis Daerah Yan

Type
- Type: Local authority

History
- Founded: 1 March 1979

Leadership
- President: Puan Maznim binti Ismail
- District Secretary: Mohd Akmal Azzimi

Website
- pbt.kedah.gov.my/index.php/majlis-daerah-yan

Yan is a district in Kedah, Malaysia. It is bordered by Kota Setar District to the north, Pendang District to the northeast and Kuala Muda District to the south. Yan District is along the coast of the Straits of Malacca. It is the smallest municipality in Kedah.

"Yan Besar" is the administrative town of Yan district, complete with administrative facilities such like Police Stations, magistrate court, district and land office. Its lifestyle is laid-back and slow-paced, with weekend attractions of natural waterfalls nearby. It also attract most pensioners to build their dream house for pleasant retirement or nurture some local fruit orchards. The waterfalls derived from the Mount Jerai are known as Seri Perigi, Tangga Kenari/Titi Hayun, Batu Hampar and Puteri Mandi.

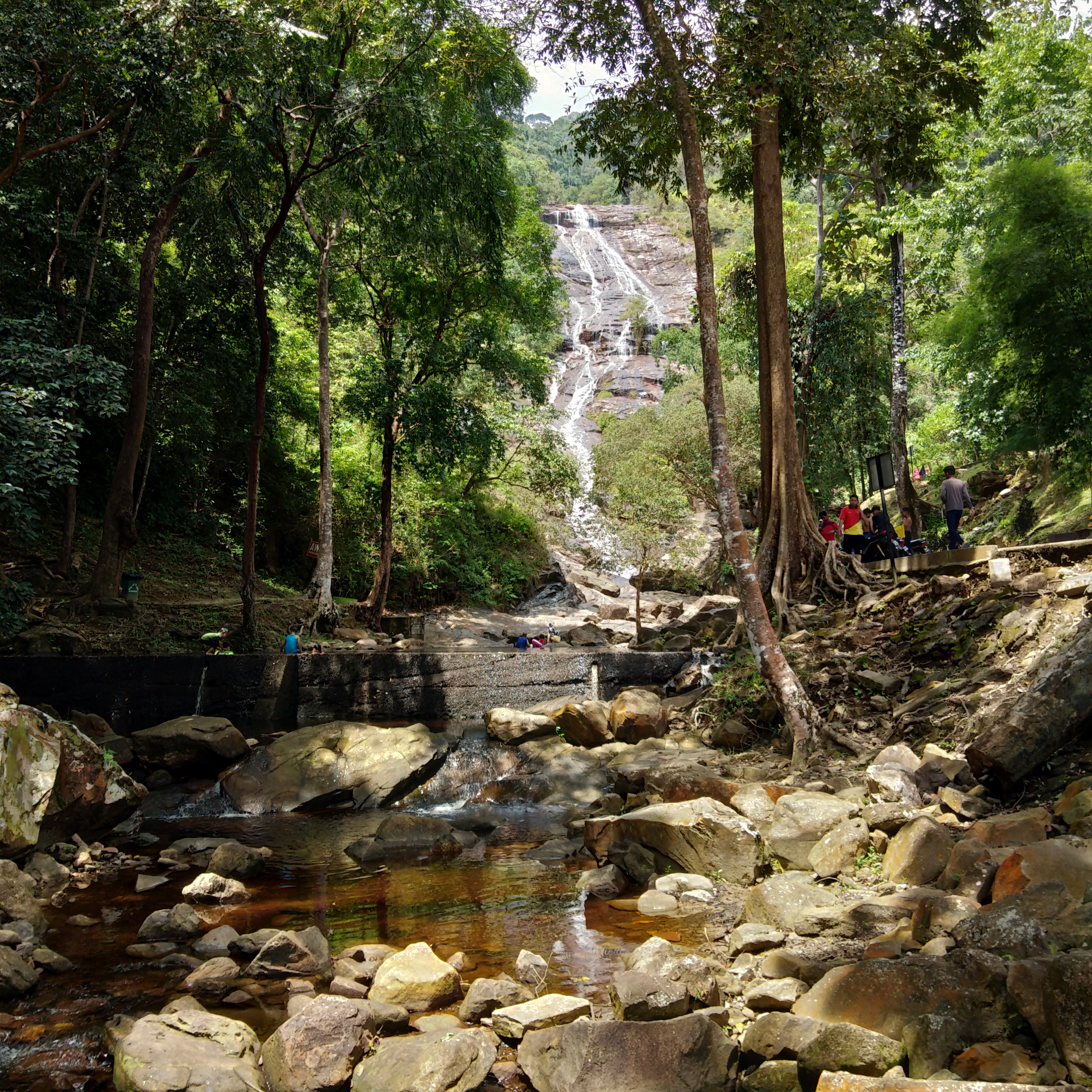
Seri Perigi waterfall

It is also famous for Mount Jerai, which is the tallest peak in Kedah at 1242 metres (3,235 ft) and is easily accessible from the town. Visitors can climb by stairs to the peak of Mount Jerai via Titi Hayun.

Pulau Bunting Bridge is a bridge that connects Pulau Bunting to Yan district. It is the only bridge connecting an island in Kedah.

== Etymology ==
The name of the district is said to come from the Siamese language which means hentam or pukul ("to hit, to strike") in Malay. There is also a source, handed down by the original inhabitants of the district, which states that the name Yan comes from the end of the word "Sendayan", a type of plant that was abundant here in the past.

== History ==
Yan District was officially opened in 1904 and was administered by a nobleman named Syed Othman Al-Qadri. The Sultan of Kedah granted him the Yan district to carry out the duties of collecting taxes and administering the district. When British rule began in 1909, Yan District was officially created and the first District Officer was appointed, Tunku Mansor ibni Sultan Abdul Hamid Halim Shah. The main duties of the District Officer at that time were to manage the administration, act as magistrates for minor offences and collect taxes.

== Administrative divisions ==
Map of Yan District

Yan is divided into 5 mukims, which are:

1. Dulang
2. Sala Besar
3. Singkir
4. Sungai Daun
5. Yan

== Demographics ==
Historical population
Year	Pop.	±%
1991	60,483	—
2000	62,217	+2.9%
2010	66,606	+7.1%
2020	73,384	+10.2%

== Attractions ==
- Mount Jerai
- Murni Beach
- Titi Hayun Recreational Forest (Hutan Lipur Titi Hayun)
- Seri Perigi Recreational Forest (Hutan Lipur Seri Perigi)
- Mandi Puteri Waterfall
- Tangga Kenari (Kenari Stairs)

== People from Yan ==
- Abdullah Hussain – novelist and writer.
- Abdul Rahman Hashim – deceased Inspector General of Police.

== Federal Parliament and State Assembly seats ==
List of Yan district representatives in the Federal Parliament (Dewan Rakyat)

Parliament	Seat Name	Member of Parliament	Party
P12	Jerai	Sabri Azit	Perikatan Nasional (PAS)

List of Yan district representatives in the State Legislative Assembly (Dewan Undangan Negeri)

Parliament	State	Seat Name	State Assemblyman	Party
P12	N20	Sungai Limau	Mohd Azam bin Abd Samat	Perikatan Nasional (PAS)
P12	N21	Guar Chempedak	Abdul Ghafar Saad	Perikatan Nasional (BERSATU)
