= Members of the Dewan Negara, 14th Malaysian Parliament =

14th Parliament of Malaysia
←	13th Parliament	15th Parliament	→

Overview
- Legislative body: Parliament of Malaysia
- Jurisdiction: Malaysia
- Meeting place: Malaysian Houses of Parliament
- Term: 16 July 2018 – 10 October 2022
- Election: Indirect election and appointments
- Website: www.parlimen.gov.my

Dewan Negara
- Members: 70
- President: Vigneswaran Sanasee (until 22 June 2020); Rais Yatim
- Deputy President: Abdul Halim Abdul Samad (until 2 November 2020); Mohamad Ali Mohamad
- Secretary: Riduan Rahmat (until 12 May 2020); Muhammad Sujairi Abdullah
- Party control: Pakatan Harapan (PH) (until 24 February 2020); Perikatan Nasional (until 16 August 2021); Barisan Nasional

Sovereign
- Yang di-Pertuan Agong: Sultan Muhammad V (until 6 January 2019); Sultan Nazrin Mu'izzuddin Shah (Acting: 6–31 January 2019); Al-Sultan Abdullah Ri'ayatuddin Al-Mustafa Billah Shah

Sessions
- 1st: 1st Meeting: 20 August 2018 – 12 September 2018; 2nd Meeting: 3 December 2018 – 20 December 2018
- 2nd: 1st Meeting: 22 April 2019 – 9 May 2019; 2nd Meeting: 22 July 2019 – 31 July 2019; 3rd Meeting: 9 December 2019 – 19 December 2019
- 3rd: 1st Meeting: 18 May 2020; 2nd Meeting: 2 September 2020 – 23 September 2020; 3rd Meeting: 14 December 2020 – 29 December 2020
- 4th: 1st Meeting: 13 September 2021 – 26 Oktober 2021; 2nd Meeting: 14 December 2021 – 23 December 2021
- 5th: 1st Meeting: 21 March 2022 – 4 April 2022; Special Meeting: 27 July 2022; 2nd Meeting: 8 August 2022 – 16 August 2022

The following is the list of members of the Dewan Negara (Senate) of the 14th Malaysian Parliament. 26 out of 70 senators, two senators for each state, are elected by their respective State Legislative Assembly for a three-year term. The other 44, including four senators representing the Federal Territories, are appointed by the Yang di-Pertuan Agong also for a three-year term.

Previously, Barisan Nasional (BN); together with Malaysian Islamic Party (PAS), remains the majority in the Dewan Negara despite Pakatan Harapan (PH); together with Sabah Heritage Party (WARISAN) and United Pasokmomogun Kadazandusun Murut Organisation (UPKO) becomes the new governing party in the Dewan Rakyat, until February 2020. This is due to the constitutional nature that senators are not elected directly by the people, but instead elected by the State Legislative Assembly or appointed by the Yang di-Pertuan Agong, which most of senatorial elections or appointments took place in the previous parliamentary term (i.e., the 13th Parliament).

== Composition ==
The last composition of the Dewan Negara as of 3 November 2022, 2 weeks prior to the 2022 general election.

The automatic resignation of its 17 former senators in only less than a month post-dissolution of 14th Malaysian Parliament due to their candidature in the 2022 (15th) General Election, had results to huge number of vacant senate seats; which is 24 seats (34.3%) out of 70 seats, the highest record in Malaysian Senate history at that time.

Government (40) + Independent (4)												Opposition (2)		Vacant (24)
BN			PN			GPS				GRS	IND	PH		VAC
21			13			6				2	2	2		24
15	3	3	7	4	2	3	1	1	1	2	2	1	1	24
UMNO	MCA	MIC	BERSATU	PAS	GERAKAN	PBB	SUPP	PRS	PDP	BERSATU Sabah	IND	PKR	DAP	VAC

== Incumbent members ==
As of 3 November 2022, senators are:

Senator	Party	State	Term	Term start	Term end	Remarks
=== Elected by State Legislative Assemblies ===
BN 10 | PN 3 | PH 2 | GPS 2 | GRS 1 | VAC 8 (Selangor 2, Penang 2, Kedah 2, Terengganu 1, Perak 1)
Ahmad Azam Hamzah	PH (PKR)	Negeri Sembilan	Second	15 August 2022	14 August 2025	
Ahmad Ibrahim	GPS (PBB)	Sarawak	First	22 July 2022	21 July 2025	
Ajis Sitin	BN (UMNO)	Pahang	First	25 August 2021	24 August 2024	
Aziz Ariffin	BN (UMNO)	Perlis	First	26 August 2021	25 August 2024	
Bobbey Ah Fang Suan	GRS-PN (BERSATU)	Sabah	First	5 January 2021	4 January 2024	
Hussin Awang	PN (PAS)	Terengganu	Second	15 September 2021	14 September 2024	
Jefridin Atan	BN (UMNO)	Johor	First	15 September 2020	14 September 2023	MLA for Kukup
Juhanis Abdul Aziz	BN (UMNO)	Pahang	First	25 August 2021	24 August 2024	
Kesavadas Achyuthan Nair	PH (DAP)	Negeri Sembilan	Second	25 April 2022	24 April 2025	
Koh Nai Kwong	BN (MCA)	Malacca	First	21 December 2020	20 December 2023	
Lim Pay Hen	BN (MCA)	Johor	Second	26 June 2022	25 June 2025	
Mohamad Ali Mohamad	BN (UMNO)	Malacca	First	20 May 2020	19 May 2023	Deputy President of the Dewan Negara
Mohd Apandi Mohamad	PN (PAS)	Kelantan	First	2 September 2020	1 September 2023	
Noraini Idris	BN (UMNO)	Sabah	First	10 December 2021	9 December 2024	
Nuing Jeluing (Note: Dr. Nuing Jeluing was initially a Barisan Nasional (PBB) senator. His party decided to leave BN on 12 June 2018 and joined Gabungan Parti Sarawak on 20 November 2018.)	GPS (PBB)	Sarawak	Second	16 December 2020	15 December 2023	
Seruandi Saad	BN (UMNO)	Perlis	First	26 August 2021	25 August 2024	
Shamsuddin Abd Ghaffar	BN (UMNO)	Perak	First	20 December 2021	19 December 2024	
Wan Martina Wan Yusoff	PN (PAS)	Kelantan	First	24 August 2021	23 August 2024	
=== Appointed by the Yang di-Pertuan Agong ===
BN 11 | PN 10 | GPS 4 | GRS 1 | IND 2 | VAC 16
Ahmad Masrizal Muhammad	BN (UMNO)	At-large	First	9 March 2020	8 March 2023	
Aknan Ehtook	PN (BERSATU)	Siamese	Second	1 December 2020	30 November 2023	
Arman Azha Abu Hanifah	BN (UMNO)	At-large	First	26 October 2021	25 October 2024	
Azhar Ahmad	BN (UMNO)	At-large	First	21 March 2022	20 March 2025	
Balasubramaniam Nachiappan	PN (PAS)	At-large	First	16 June 2020	15 June 2023	
Dominic Lau Hoe Chai	PN (GERAKAN)	At-large	First	23 November 2021	22 November 2024	
Jaziri Alkaf Abdillah Suffian	PN (BERSATU)	At-large	First	21 December 2020	20 December 2023	
John Ambrose (Note: John Ambrose was initially Barisan Nasional (UMNO) senator. He left party to become independent senator on 12 December 2018 before switching allegiance to Pakatan Harapan (BERSATU) on 15 March 2019. However, his current party left PH on 24 February 2020.)	GRS-PN (BERSATU)	At-large	Second	16 January 2021	15 January 2024	
Md Nasir Hashim (Note: Md Nasir Hashim was initially Pakatan Harapan (BERSATU) senator. His party decided to leave PH on 24 February 2020.)	PN (BERSATU)	At-large	Second	27 August 2021	26 August 2024	
Mohamad Fatmi Che Salleh	BN (UMNO)	At-large	First	25 April 2022	24 April 2025	
Mohamed Haniffa Abdullah	BN (MIC)	At-large	First	20 September 2022	19 September 2025	
Mohd Hisamudin Yahaya	BN (UMNO)	Putrajaya	First	4 October 2021	3 October 2024	
Mohd Radzi Sheikh Ahmad	PN (BERSATU)	At-large	First	16 June 2020	15 June 2023	
Muhammad Zahid Md Arip	PN (BERSATU)	Kuala Lumpur	First	16 June 2020	15 June 2023	
Nelson Renganathan	BN (MIC)	At-large	First	23 November 2021	22 November 2024	
Paul Igai (Note: Paul Igai was initially a Barisan Nasional (PDP) senator. His party decided to leave BN on 12 June 2018 and joined Gabungan Parti Sarawak on 20 November 2018.)	GPS (PDP)	At-large	Second	16 December 2020	15 December 2023	
Rais Yatim	PN (BERSATU)	At-large	First	16 June 2020	15 June 2023	President of the Dewan Negara
Ras Adiba Radzi	Independent	PWD	First	20 May 2020	19 May 2023	
Razali Idris (Note: Razali Idris was initially Pakatan Harapan (BERSATU) senator. His party decided to leave PH on 24 February 2020.)	PN (BERSATU)	At-large	Second	27 August 2021	26 August 2024	
Rita Sarimah Patrick Insol	GPS (PRS)	At-large	First	22 June 2020	21 June 2023	
Robert Lau Hui Yew	GPS (SUPP)	At-large	First	22 June 2020	21 June 2023	
Ros Suyati Alang	BN (UMNO)	At-large	First	20 September 2022	19 September 2025	
Susan Chemerai Anding	GPS (PBB)	At-large	First	22 June 2020	21 June 2023	
Teo Eng Tee (Note: Teo Eng Tee was initially a Barisan Nasional (GERAKAN) senator. His party decided to leave BN on 23 June 2018.)	PN (GERAKAN)	At-large	Second	19 July 2021	18 July 2024	
Ti Lian Ker (Note: Ti Lian Ker was initially elected by the Pahang state assembly for his first term. Due to his appointment as a Deputy Minister, his second term is by appointment of the Yang di-Pertuan Agong)	BN (MCA)	At-large	Second	10 August 2021	9 August 2024	
Vell Paari Samy Vellu	BN (MIC)	At-large	First	2 September 2020	1 September 2023	
Zulkifli Mohamad Al-Bakri	Independent	At-large	First	9 March 2020	8 March 2023	
Zurainah Musa	BN (UMNO)	At-large	First	22 December 2021	21 December 2024	

== Former members ==
The following members exited the Dewan Negara prior to the start of the 15th Parliament:

Senator	Party	Representing	Term	Term start	Term end
Hoh Khai Mun	BN (MCA)	Pahang	First	22 June 2015	29 May 2018
Ariffin S.M. Omar	PH (DAP)	Penang	Second	8 June 2012	1 June 2018
Siti Aishah Shaik Ismail	PH (PKR)	Penang	First	22 June 2015	1 June 2018
Abdul Rahman Mat Yassin	BN (UMNO)	Terengganu	First	22 June 2015	21 June 2018
Khairiah Mohamed	GS (PAS)	Kelantan	Second	9 July 2012	30 June 2018
Azizah Harun	BN (UMNO)	At-large	First	6 July 2016	5 July 2018
Engku Naimah Engku Taib	BN (UMNO)	Terengganu	First	6 November 2015	5 November 2018
Lucas Umbul (Note: Lucas Umbul was initially a Barisan Nasional (UPKO) senator. His party decided to leave BN on 10 May 2018.)	UPKO	Sabah	Second	10 December 2015	9 December 2018
Chandra Mohan Thambirajah	PH (DAP)	Selangor	Second	17 December 2015	16 December 2018
Muhammad Nur Manuty	PH (PKR)	Selangor	First	17 December 2015	16 December 2018
Jamilah @ Halimah Sulaiman (Note: Jamilah Sulaiman was initially a Barisan Nasional (PBS) senator. Her party decided to leave BN on 12 May 2018 and joined Gabungan Bersatu Sabah on 24 October 2018.)	GBS (PBS)	At-large	Second	22 December 2015	21 December 2018
Paul Low Seng Kuan	Independent	At-large	Second	15 May 2016	14 May 2019
Khairudin E. S. Abd. Samad (Note: Khairudin E. S. Abd. Samad, initially a Barisan Nasional (UMNO) senator, switched allegiance to Pakatan Harapan (BERSATU) on 28 November 2018.)	PH (BERSATU)	At-large	Second	7 October 2016	6 October 2019
Megat Zulkarnain Omardin	BN (UMNO)	At-large	Second	7 October 2016	6 October 2019
Yahaya Mat Ghani	BN (UMNO)	At-large	Second	7 October 2016	6 October 2019
Sambanthan Manickam	IPF	At-large	First	25 September 2017	15 October 2019 (Note: Sambanthan Manickam died in office on 15 October 2019.)
Abidullah Salleh	BN (UMNO)	Malacca	First	27 October 2016	26 October 2019
Bathmavathi Krishnan	Independent	PWD	Second	18 November 2016	17 November 2019
Ong Chong Swen	BN (MCA)	At-large	Second	19 February 2018	18 November 2019 (Note: Ong Chong Swen died in office on 18 November 2019.)
Fahariyah Md. Nordin	BN (UMNO)	At-large	First	7 December 2016	6 December 2019
Hanafi Mamat	BN (UMNO)	At-large	First	7 December 2016	6 December 2019
Khairul Azwan Harun	BN (UMNO)	At-large	First	7 December 2016	6 December 2019
Mustapa Kamal Mohd Yusoff	BN (UMNO)	Kuala Lumpur	First	7 December 2016	6 December 2019
Rabiyah Ali	BN (UMNO)	At-large	First	7 December 2016	6 December 2019
Rahemah Idris	BN (UMNO)	At-large	First	7 December 2016	6 December 2019
Rahimah Mahamad	BN (UMNO)	At-large	Second	31 March 2017	30 March 2020
Zahari Sarip	BN (UMNO)	Johor	First	5 June 2017	4 June 2020
Chai Kim Sen	BN (MCA)	At-large	Second	23 June 2017	22 June 2020
Vigneswaran Sanasee	BN (MIC)	At-large	Second	23 June 2017	22 June 2020
Muhamad Mustafa	PAS	Kelantan	First	8 July 2017	7 July 2020
Ananthan Somasundaram	BN (MIC)	Kedah	First	15 August 2017	14 August 2020
Mohd Suhaimi Abdullah (Note: Mohd Suhaimi Abdullah, initially a Barisan Nasional (UMNO) senator, switched allegiance to Pakatan Harapan (BERSATU) on 28 November 2018.)	PN (BERSATU)	Kedah	Second	15 August 2017	14 August 2020
Yong Wui Chung (Note: Yong Wui Chung was initially a Barisan Nasional (LDP) senator. His party decided to leave BN on 11 May 2018.)	LDP	At-large	First	22 August 2017	21 August 2020
Sopiah Sharif	BN (UMNO)	At-large	First	17 July 2017	16 July 2020
Ng Chiang Chin (Note: Ng Chaing Chin was initially a Barisan Nasional (GERAKAN) senator. His party decided to leave BN on 23 June 2018.)	GERAKAN	At-large	Second	10 September 2017	9 September 2020
Yakubah Khan	BN (UMNO)	At-large	First	22 June 2020	8 October 2020
Abdul Halim Abdul Samad	BN (UMNO)	At-large	Second	3 November 2017	2 November 2020
Lee Tian Sing	BN (MCA)	Malacca	First	29 November 2017	28 November 2020
Ibrahim Shah Abu Shah	BN (UMNO)	At-large	Second	11 December 2017	10 December 2020
Abdul Ghani Mohamed Yassin (Note: Abdul Ghani Mohamed Yassin was initially Barisan Nasional (UMNO) senator. He left party to become independent senator on 12 December 2018 before switching allegiance to Pakatan Harapan (BERSATU) on 15 March 2019. However, his current party left PH on 24 February 2020.)	GRS-PN (BERSATU)	Sabah	First	5 January 2018	4 January 2021
Asmak Husin	PN (PAS)	Kelantan	First	1 July 2018	30 June 2021
Ismail Ibrahim	BN (UMNO)	At-large	First	17 July 2018	16 July 2021
Liew Chin Tong	PH (DAP)	At-large	First	17 July 2018	16 July 2021
Marzuki Yahya (Note: Marzuki Yahya was initially a Pakatan Harapan (BERSATU) senator. His party decided to leave PH on 24 February 2020. He later joined PEJUANG alongside other former BERSATU members.)	PEJUANG	At-large	First	17 July 2018	16 July 2021
Raja Kamarul Bahrin Shah Raja Ahmad Baharuddin Shah	PH (AMANAH)	At-large	First	17 July 2018	16 July 2021
Waytha Moorthy Ponnusamy	MAP	At-large	Second	17 July 2018	16 July 2021
Kamarudin Abdun	BN (UMNO)	Perlis	First	25 July 2018	24 July 2021
Sabani Mat	BN (UMNO)	Perlis	First	25 July 2018	24 July 2021
Siti Fatimah Yahaya	BN (UMNO)	Pahang	First	10 August 2018	9 August 2021
Ismail Yusop	PH (PKR)	Perak	First	13 August 2018	12 August 2021
Nga Hock Cheh	PH (DAP)	Perak	First	13 August 2018	12 August 2021
Adrian Banie Lasimbang	PH (DAP)	At-large	First	27 August 2018	26 August 2021
Alan Ling Sie Kiong	PH (DAP)	At-large	First	27 August 2018	26 August 2021
Manolan Mohamad	PH (PKR)	Aborigines	First	27 August 2018	26 August 2021
Mohamad Imran Abdul Hamid	PH (PKR)	At-large	First	27 August 2018	26 August 2021
Mohd Yusmadi Mohd Yusoff	PH (PKR)	Penang	First	27 August 2018	26 August 2021
Raj Munni Sabu	PH (AMANAH)	Kuala Lumpur	First	27 August 2018	26 August 2021
Theodore Douglas Lind	WARISAN	At-large	First	27 August 2018	26 August 2021
Husam Musa	PH (AMANAH)	At-large	First	3 September 2018	2 September 2021
Guan Dee Koh Hoi	GRS-PN (STAR)	At-large	First	16 December 2020	26 October 2021 (Note: Guan Dee Koh Hoi died in office on 26 October 2021.)
Suresh Singh Rashpal Singh	PH (DAP)	Selangor	First	5 December 2018	4 December 2021
Yaakob Sapari	PH (PKR)	Selangor	First	5 December 2018	4 December 2021
Donald Peter Mojuntin	PH (UPKO)	Sabah	First	10 December 2018	9 December 2021
Isa Ab. Hamid (Note: Isa Ab. Hamid, initially an independent senator, joined Pakatan Harapan (BERSATU) on 28 November 2018, BERSATU later left Pakatan Harapan on 24 February 2020.)	PN (BERSATU)	Aborigines	Second	22 April 2019	21 April 2022
Zaiedi Suhaili (Note: Dr. Zaiedi Suhaili was initially a Barisan Nasional (PBB) senator. His party decided to leave BN on 12 June 2018 and joined Gabungan Parti Sarawak on 20 November 2018.)	GPS (PBB)	Sarawak	Second	22 July 2019	21 July 2022
Lim Ban Hong (Note: This member exited the Senate following their candidature in the 15th General Election.)	BN (MCA)	At-large	First	9 March 2020	3 November 2022
Mah Hang Soon	BN (MCA)	At-large	First	9 March 2020	3 November 2022
Tengku Zafrul Tengku Abdul Aziz	BN (UMNO)	At-large	First	9 March 2020	3 November 2022
Wan Ahmad Fayhsal Wan Ahmad Kamal	PN (BERSATU)	At-large	First	9 March 2020	3 November 2022
Idris Ahmad	PN (PAS)	At-large	First	16 June 2020	3 November 2022
Bashir Alias	BN (UMNO)	Labuan	Second	22 June 2020	3 November 2022
Ahmad Yahaya	PN (PAS)	Kedah	First	2 September 2020	3 November 2022
Othman Aziz	BN (UMNO)	Kedah	First	2 September 2020	3 November 2022
Mohan Thangarasu	BN (MIC)	At-large	Second	1 December 2020	3 November 2022
Khairil Nizam Khirudin	PN (PAS)	At-large	First	28 December 2020	3 November 2022
Mohd Radzi Md Jidin (Note: Mohd Radzi Md Jidin was initially Pakatan Harapan (BERSATU) senator. His party decided to leave PH on 24 February 2020.)	PN (BERSATU)	At-large	Second	17 July 2021	3 November 2022
Fadhlina Sidek	PH (PKR)	Penang	First	1 September 2021	3 November 2022
Lim Hui Ying	PH (DAP)	Penang	Second	1 September 2021	3 November 2022
Nuridah Mohd Salleh	PN (PAS)	Terengganu	Second	29 November 2021	3 November 2022
Iskandar Dzulkarnain Abdul Khalid	PN (BERSATU)	Perak	First	20 December 2021	3 November 2022
Mohd Ridhwan Mohd Ali	BN (UMNO)	At-large	First	21 March 2022	3 November 2022
Nicole Wong Siaw Ting	BN (MCA)	At-large	First	17 June 2022	3 November 2022
