= Members of the Dewan Negara, 13th Malaysian Parliament =

13th Parliament of Malaysia
←	12th Parliament	14th Parliament	→

Overview
- Legislative body: Parliament of Malaysia
- Jurisdiction: Malaysia
- Meeting place: Malaysian Houses of Parliament
- Term: 24 June 2013 – 7 April 2018
- Election: Indirect election and appointments
- Website: www.parlimen.gov.my

Dewan Negara
- Members: 70
- President: Abu Zahar Ujang (until 26 April 2016); S. Vigneswaran
- Deputy President: Doris Sophia Brodi (until 11 March 2016); Abdul Halim Abdul Samad
- Secretary: Zamani Sulaiman (until 7 September 2014); Riduan Rahmat
- Party control: Barisan Nasional

Sovereign
- Yang di-Pertuan Agong: Tuanku Abdul Halim Muadzam Shah (until 12 December 2016); Sultan Muhammad V

Sessions
- 1st: 25 June 2013 – 19 December 2013
- 2nd: 10 March 2014 – 18 December 2014
- 3rd: 9 March 2015 – 28 January 2016
- 4th: 7 March 2016 – 21 December 2016
- 5th: 6 March 2017 – 19 December 2017
- 6th: 5 March 2018 – 5 April 2018

This is a list of the members of the Dewan Negara (Senate) of the Thirteenth Parliament of Malaysia.

== Elected by the State Legislative Assembly ==
Senator	Party	State	Term start		Term end
Abdul Ghani Mohamed Yassin	BN (UMNO)	Sabah	5 January 2018	(Note: Took and subscribed the Oath on 5 January 2018 under S.O. 4(3).)	4 January 2021
Abdul Rahman Mat Yasin	BN (UMNO)	Terengganu	22 June 2015	(Note: Took and subscribed the Oath on 22 June 2015. Hansard - 22 June 2015)	21 June 2018
Abdul Shukor P. A. Mohd Sultan	BN (UMNO)	Perlis	2 May 2012	(Note: Took and subscribed the Oath on 2 May 2012. Hansard - 2 May 2012)	1 May 2015
Abdul Shukor P. A. Mohd Sultan	BN (UMNO)	Perlis	25 April 2015	(Note: Took and subscribed the Oath on 25 April 2015 under S.O. 4(3). Hansard - 27 April 2015)	24 April 2018
Abidullah Salleh	BN (UMNO)	Malacca	18 November 2016	(Note: Took and subscribed the Oath on 18 November 2016 under S.O. 4(3). Hansard - 5 December 2016)	17 November 2019
Adam Abdul Hamid	BN (UMNO)	Johor	20 February 2014	(Note: Took and subscribed the Oath on 20 February 2014 under S.O. 4(3). Hansard - 21 April 2014)	19 February 2017
Ahamad Yusop	BN (UMNO)	Johor	15 July 2008	(Note: Took and subscribed the Oath on 15 July 2008. Hansard - 15 July 2008)	14 July 2011
Ahamad Yusop	BN (UMNO)	Johor	4 July 2011	(Note: Took and subscribed the Oath on 4 July 2011. Hansard - 4 July 2011)	3 July 2014
Ananthan Somasundaram	BN (MIC)	Kedah	17 August 2017	(Note: Took and subscribed the Oath on 17 August 2017. Hansard - 17 August 2017)	16 August 2020
Ariffin Omar	DAP	Penang	8 June 2012	(Note: Took and subscribed the Oath on 8 June 2012 under S.O. 4(3). Hansard - 9 July 2012)	7 June 2015
Ariffin Omar	DAP	Penang	22 June 2015		21 June 2018
Chandra Mohan S. Thambirajah	DAP	Selangor	17 December 2012	(Note: Took and subscribed the Oath on 17 December 2012. Hansard - 17 December 2012)	16 December 2015
Chandra Mohan S. Thambirajah	DAP	Selangor	17 December 2015	(Note: Took and subscribed the Oath on 17 December 2015. Hansard - 17 December 2015)	16 December 2018
Chia Song Cheng	BN (MCA)	Johor	1 December 2014	(Note: Took and subscribed the Oath on 1 December 2014. Hansard - 1 December 2014)	30 November 2017
Chong Sin Woon	BN (MCA)	Negeri Sembilan	21 April 2014	(Note: Took and subscribed the Oath on 21 April 2014. Hansard - 21 April 2014)	20 April 2017
Chong Sin Woon	BN (MCA)	Negeri Sembilan	21 April 2017	(Note: Took and subscribed the Oath on 21 April 2017 under S.O. 4(3).)	20 April 2020
Dayang Madinah Abang Openg	BN (PBB)	Sarawak	19 July 2010	(Note: Took and subscribed the Oath on 19 July 2010. Hansard - 19 July 2010)	18 July 2013
Dayang Madinah Abang Openg	BN (PBB)	Sarawak	19 July 2013	(Note: Took and subscribed the Oath on 19 July 2013 under S.O. 4(3). Hansard - 22 July 2013)	18 July 2016
Engku Naimah Engku Taib	BN (UMNO)	Terengganu	6 November 2015	(Note: Took and subscribed the Oath on 6 November 2015. Hansard - 7 December 2015)	5 November 2018
Hamzah Mohd Kasim	BN (UMNO)	Perak	21 April 2014		20 April 2017
Hamzah Mohd Kasim	BN (UMNO)	Perak	21 April 2017		20 April 2020
Hoh Khai Mun	BN (MCA)	Pahang	22 June 2015		21 June 2018
Johari Mat	PAS	Kelantan	7 July 2011	(Note: Took and subscribed the Oath on 7 July 2011. Hansard - 7 July 2011)	6 July 2014
Johari Mat	PAS	Kelantan	14 July 2014	(Note: Took and subscribed the Oath on 14 July 2014 under S.O. 4(3). Hansard - 1 December 2014)	13 July 2017
Kadzim M. Yahya	BN (UMNO)	Sabah	22 December 2011	(Note: Took and subscribed the Oath on 22 December 2011. Hansard - 22 December 2011)	21 December 2014
Kadzim M. Yahya	BN (UMNO)	Sabah	29 December 2014	(Note: Took and subscribed the Oath on 29 December 2014 under S.O. 4(3). Hansard - 13 April 2015)	28 December 2017
Khairiah Mohamed	PAS	Kelantan	9 July 2012	(Note: Took and subscribed the Oath on 9 July 2012. Hansard - 9 July 2012)	8 July 2015
Khairiah Mohamed	PAS	Kelantan	1 July 2015	(Note: Took and subscribed the Oath on 1 July 2015. Hansard - 1 July 2015)	30 June 2018
Koh Chin Han	BN (MCA)	Malacca	1 December 2014		30 November 2017
Lee Chee Leong	BN (MCA)	Perak	21 April 2014		20 April 2017
Lee Chee Leong	BN (MCA)	Perak	21 April 2017		20 April 2020
Lee Tian Sing	BN (MCA)	Melaka	29 November 2017		28 November 2020
Lihan Jok	BN (PBB)	Sarawak	7 December 2011	(Note: Took and subscribed the Oath on 7 December 2011. Hansard - 7 December 2011)	6 December 2014
Lihan Jok	BN (PBB)	Sarawak	8 December 2014	(Note: Took and subscribed the Oath on 8 December 2014. Hansard - 8 December 2014)	7 December 2017
Lim Nget Yoon	BN (MCA)	Pahang	8 June 2012		7 June 2015
Lim Pay Hen	BN (MCA)	Johor	4 December 2017		3 December 2020
Lucas Umbul	BN (UPKO)	Sabah	10 December 2012	(Note: Took and subscribed the Oath on 10 December 2012. Hansard - 10 December 2012)	9 December 2015
Lucas Umbul	BN (UPKO)	Sabah	10 December 2015	(Note: Took and subscribed the Oath on 10 December 2015. Hansard - 10 December 2015)	9 December 2018
Mohd Ali Rustam	BN (UMNO)	Malacca	7 October 2013	(Note: Took and subscribed the Oath on 7 October 2013. Hansard - 7 October 2013)	6 October 2016
Mohd Khalid Ahmad	BN (UMNO)	Perlis	6 May 2009	(Note: Took and subscribed the Oath on 6 May 2009. Hansard - 6 July 2009)	5 May 2012
Mohd Khalid Ahmad	BN (UMNO)	Perlis	2 May 2012		1 May 2015
Mohd Nor Monutty	PKR	Selangor	17 December 2015		16 December 2018
Mohd Salim Sharif	BN (UMNO)	Negeri Sembilan	21 April 2014		20 April 2017
Mohd Salim Sharif	BN (UMNO)	Negeri Sembilan	21 April 2017		20 April 2020
Mohd. Suhaimi Abdullah	BN (UMNO)	Kedah	30 May 2014	(Note: Took and subscribed the Oath on 30 May 2014 under S.O. 4(3). Hansard - 30 May 2014)	29 May 2017
Mohd. Suhaimi Abdullah	BN (UMNO)	Kedah	17 August 2017		16 August 2020
Muhamad Mustafa	PAS	Kelantan	31 July 2017	(Note: Took and subscribed the Oath on 31 July 2017 under S.O. 4(3).)	30 July 2020
Muhamad Yusof Husin	PAS	Kedah	26 May 2008	(Note: Took and subscribed the Oath on 26 May 2008. Hansard - 26 May 2008)	25 May 2011
Muhamad Yusof Husin	PAS	Kedah	30 May 2011	(Note: Took and subscribed the Oath on 30 May 2011 under S.O. 4 (3). Hansard - 4 July 2011)	29 May 2014
Norahan Abu Bakar	BN (UMNO)	Pahang	22 June 2015		22 September 2017
Nuing Jeluing	BN (PBB)	Sarawak	11 December 2017		10 December 2020
Ramli Shariff	BN (UMNO)	Perlis	25 April 2015		24 April 2018
Rohani Abdullah	BN (UMNO)	Terengganu	26 January 2012	(Note: Took and subscribed the Oath on 26 January 2012. Hansard - 26 January 2012)	25 January 2015
Roslin Abdul Rahman	BN (UMNO)	Pahang	8 June 2012		7 June 2015
Saat Abu	BN (UMNO)	Malacca	7 December 2011		6 December 2014
Saiful Izham Ramli	PKR	Kedah	30 May 2011		29 May 2014
Shahanim Mohamad Yusoff	BN (UMNO)	Kedah	30 May 2014		29 May 2017
Siti Aishah Shaik Ismail	PKR	Penang	22 June 2015		21 June 2018
Syed Husin Ali	PKR	Selangor	16 December 2009	(Note: Took and subscribed the Oath on 16 December 2009. Hansard - 16 December 2009)	15 December 2012
Syed Husin Ali	PKR	Selangor	17 December 2012		16 December 2015
Syed Shahir Syed Mohamud	PKR	Penang	8 June 2012		7 June 2015
Zahari Sarip	BN (UMNO)	Johor	5 June 2017	(Note: Took and subscribed the Oath on 5 June 2017 under S.O. 4(3).)	4 June 2020
Zaiedi Suhaili	BN (PBB)	Sarawak	19 July 2016	(Note: Took and subscribed the Oath on 19 July 2016 under S.O. 4(3).)	18 July 2019
Zaitun Mat Amin	BN (UMNO)	Terengganu	8 June 2012		7 June 2015

== Nominated by the Prime Minister and appointed by the Yang di-Pertuan Agong ==
Senator	Party		Term start		Term end
Abdul Halim Abdul Samad (Deputy President)	BN (UMNO)	Appointed	3 November 2014	(Note: Took and subscribed the Oath on 3 November 2014 under S.O. 4(3). Hansard - 1 December 2014)	2 November 2017
Abdul Halim Abdul Samad (Deputy President)	BN (UMNO)	Appointed	3 November 2017		2 November 2020
Abdul Rahim Abdul Rahman	BN (UMNO)	Appointed	3 May 2010	(Note: Took and subscribed the Oath on 3 May 2010. Hansard - 3 May 2010)	2 May 2013
Abdul Rahim Abdul Rahman	BN (UMNO)	Appointed	27 September 2013	(Note: Took and subscribed the Oath on 27 September 2013 under S.O. 4(3). Hansard - 7 October 2013)	26 September 2016
Abdul Rahman Bakar	BN (UMNO)	Appointed	15 July 2008		14 July 2011
Abdul Rahman Bakar	BN (UMNO)	Appointed	18 July 2011	(Note: Took and subscribed the Oath on 18 July 2011 under S.O. 4(3). Hansard - 7 December 2011)	17 July 2014
Abdul Wahid Omar	IND	Appointed	5 June 2013	(Note: Took and subscribed the Oath on 5 June 2013 under S.O. 4(3). Hansard - 22 July 2013)	4 June 2016
Abdullah Mat Yasim	BN (UMNO)	Appointed	7 December 2015	(Note: Took and subscribed the Oath on 7 December 2015. Hansard - 7 December 2015)	6 December 2018
Abu Zahar Ujang (President)	BN (UMNO)	Appointed	26 April 2010	(Note: Took and subscribed the Oath on 26 April 2010. Hansard - 26 April 2010)	25 April 2013
Abu Zahar Ujang (President)	BN (UMNO)	Appointed	26 April 2013	(Note: Took and subscribed the Oath on 26 April 2013 under S.O. 4(3). Hansard - 22 July 2013)	25 April 2016
Ahmad Bashah Md Hanipah	BN (UMNO)	Appointed	21 May 2013	(Note: Took and subscribed the Oath on 21 May 2013 under S.O. 4(3). Hansard - 22 July 2013)	3 February 2016
Aknan Ehtook	IND	Appointed	15 December 2016	(Note: Took and subscribed the Oath on 15 December 2016. Hansard - 15 December 2016)	14 December 2019
Asyraf Wajdi Dusuki	BN (UMNO)	Appointed	26 May 2014	(Note: Took and subscribed the Oath on 26 May 2014 under S.O. 4(3). Hansard - 23 June 2014)	25 May 2017
Asyraf Wajdi Dusuki	BN (UMNO)	Appointed	5 June 2017		20 April 2018
Azizah Harun	BN (UMNO)	Appointed	6 July 2015	(Note: Took and subscribed the Oath on 6 July 2015. Hansard - 6 July 2015)	5 July 2018
Baharudin Abu Bakar	BN (UMNO)	Appointed	6 September 2011	(Note: Took and subscribed the Oath on 6 September 2011 under S.O. 4(3). Hansard - 7 December 2011)	5 September 2014
Bashir Alias	BN (UMNO)	Appointed	5 June 2017		4 June 2020
Bathmavathi Krishnan	IND	Appointed	18 November 2013	(Note: Took and subscribed the Oath on 18 November 2013 under S.O. 4(3). Hansard - 9 December 2013)	17 November 2016
Bathmavathi Krishnan	IND	Appointed	18 November 2016		17 November 2019
Boon Som Inong	BN (UMNO)	Appointed	15 December 2010	(Note: Took and subscribed the Oath on 15 December 2010. Hansard - 15 December 2010)	14 December 2013
Boon Som Inong	BN (UMNO)	Appointed	16 December 2013	(Note: Took and subscribed the Oath on 16 December 2013. Hansard - 16 December 2013)	15 December 2016
Chai Kim Sen	BN (MCA)	Appointed	23 June 2014	(Note: Took and subscribed the Oath on 23 June 2014. Hansard - 23 June 2014)	22 June 2017
Chai Kim Sen	BN (MCA)	Appointed	5 July 2017	(Note: Took and subscribed the Oath on 5 July 2017 under S.O. 4(3).)	4 July 2020
Chew Lee Giok	BN (MCA)	Appointed	13 December 2010	(Note: Took and subscribed the Oath on 13 December 2010. Hansard - 13 December 2010)	12 December 2013
Chew Mei Fun	BN (MCA)	Appointed	9 April 2009	(Note: Took and subscribed the Oath on 9 April 2009 under S.O. 4(3). Hansard - 6 July 2009)	8 April 2012
Chew Mei Fun	BN (MCA)	Appointed	26 June 2014	(Note: Took and subscribed the Oath on 26 June 2014. Hansard - 26 June 2014)	25 June 2017
Chiew Lian Keng	BN (MCA)	Appointed	2 November 2011	(Note: Took and subscribed the Oath on 2 November 2011 under S.O. 4(3). Hansard - 7 December 2011)	1 November 2014
Chin Su Phin	BN (LDP)	Appointed	30 May 2011		29 May 2014
Chin Su Phin	BN (LDP)	Appointed	30 May 2014		29 May 2017
Chiw Tiang Chai	BN (PPP)	Appointed	14 October 2005	(Note: Took and subscribed the Oath on 14 October 2005 under S.O. 4(3). Hansard - 7 December 2005)	13 October 2008
Chiw Tiang Chai	BN (PPP)	Appointed	22 August 2011	(Note: Took and subscribed the Oath on 22 August 2011 under S.O. 4(3). Hansard - 7 December 2011)	21 August 2014
Devamany S. Krishnasamy	BN (MIC)	Appointed	27 June 2016	(Note: Took and subscribed the Oath on 27 June 2016 under S.O. 4(3).)	26 June 2019
Doris Sophia Brodi (Deputy President)	BN (PRS)	Appointed	12 March 2010	(Note: Took and subscribed the Oath on 12 March 2010 under S.O. 4(3). Hansard - 26 April 2010)	11 March 2013
Doris Sophia Brodi (Deputy President)	BN (PRS)	Appointed	12 March 2013	(Note: Took and subscribed the Oath on 12 March 2013 under S.O. 4(3). Hansard - 22 July 2013)	11 March 2016
Fahariyah Md Nordin	BN (UMNO)	Appointed	7 December 2016	(Note: Took and subscribed the Oath on 7 December 2016. Hansard - 7 December 2016)	6 December 2019
Firdaus Abdullah	BN (UMNO)	Appointed	21 January 2009	(Note: Took and subscribed the Oath on 21 January 2009 under S.O. 4(3). Hansard - 30 March 2009)	20 January 2012
Firdaus Abdullah	BN (UMNO)	Appointed	26 January 2012		25 January 2015
Gan Ping Sieu	BN (MCA)	Appointed	2 June 2010	(Note: Took and subscribed the Oath on 2 June 2010 under S.O. 4(3). Hansard - 19 July 2010)	1 June 2013
Goonasakaren Raman	BN (MIC)	Appointed	23 June 2014		22 June 2017
Hanafi Mamat	BN (UMNO)	Appointed	7 December 2016		6 December 2019
Hou Kok Chung	BN (MCA)	Appointed	23 June 2014		22 June 2017
Hou Kok Chung	BN (MCA)	Appointed	5 July 2017		4 July 2020
Ibrahim Shah Abu Shah	BN (UMNO)	Appointed	3 November 2014		2 November 2017
Ibrahim Shah Abu Shah	BN (UMNO)	Appointed	11 December 2017		10 December 2020
Idris Jala	IND	Appointed	1 September 2009	(Note: Took and subscribed the Oath on 1 September 2009 under S.O. 4(3). Hansard - 9 December 2009)	31 August 2012
Idris Jala	IND	Appointed	3 September 2012	(Note: Took and subscribed the Oath on 3 September 2012 under S.O. 4(3). Hansard - 3 September 2012)	2 September 2015
Isa Ab Samad	IND	Appointed	18 April 2016	(Note: Took and subscribed the Oath on 18 April 2016. Hansard - 18 April 2016)	17 April 2019
Jamilah Sulaiman	BN (PBS)	Appointed	7 November 2012	(Note: Took and subscribed the Oath on 7 November 2012 under S.O. 4(3). Hansard - 3 September 2012)	6 November 2015
Jamilah Sulaiman	BN (PBS)	Appointed	22 December 2015	(Note: Took and subscribed the Oath on 22 December 2015. Hansard - 22 December 2015)	21 December 2018
Jaspal Singh Gurbakhes Singh	BN (MIC)	Appointed	2 November 2011		1 November 2014
Jaspal Singh Gurbakhes Singh	BN (MIC)	Appointed	20 November 2014	(Note: Took and subscribed the Oath on 20 November 2014 under S.O. 4(3). Hansard - 1 December 2014)	19 November 2017
John Ambrose	BN (UMNO)	Appointed	16 January 2018	(Note: Took and subscribed the Oath on 16 January 2018 under S.O. 4(3).)	15 January 2021
Khairuddin E. S. Abdul Samad	BN (UMNO)	Appointed	7 October 2013		6 October 2016
Khairuddin E. S. Abdul Samad	BN (UMNO)	Appointed	10 October 2016	(Note: Took and subscribed the Oath on 10 October 2016 under S.O. 4(3).)	9 October 2019
Khairul Azwan Harun	BN (UMNO)	Appointed	7 December 2016		6 December 2019
Koh Tsu Koon	BN (Gerakan)	Appointed	9 April 2009		8 April 2012
Koh Tsu Koon	BN (Gerakan)	Appointed	9 April 2012	(Note: Took and subscribed the Oath on 9 April 2012 under S.O. 4(3). Hansard - 23 April 2012)	8 April 2015
Loga Bala Mohan Jaganathan	BN (myPPP)	Appointed	21 May 2013		20 May 2016
Loga Bala Mohan Jaganathan	BN (myPPP)	Appointed	16 May 2016	(Note: Took and subscribed the Oath on 16 May 2016 under S.O. 4(3). Hansard - 13 June 2016)	15 May 2019
Maglin Dennis D'Cruz	BN (PPP)	Appointed	2 June 2010		1 June 2013
Mariany Mohammad Yit	BN (UMNO)	Appointed	15 December 2010		14 December 2013
Mariany Mohammad Yit	BN (UMNO)	Appointed	16 December 2013		15 December 2016
Mashitah Ibrahim	BN (UMNO)	Appointed	18 March 2008	(Note: Took and subscribed the Oath on 18 March 2008 under S.O. 4(3). Hansard - 26 May 2008)	17 March 2011
Mashitah Ibrahim	BN (UMNO)	Appointed	21 March 2011	(Note: Took and subscribed the Oath on 21 March 2011 under S.O. 4(3). Hansard - 18 April 2011)	20 March 2014
Maznah Mazlan	BN (UMNO)	Appointed	21 April 2008	(Note: Took and subscribed the Oath on 21 April 2008 under S.O. 4(3). Hansard - 26 May 2008)	20 April 2011
Maznah Mazlan	BN (UMNO)	Appointed	25 April 2011	(Note: Took and subscribed the Oath on 25 April 2011. Hansard - 25 April 2011)	24 April 2014
Megat Zulkarnain Omardin	BN (UMNO)	Appointed	7 October 2013		6 October 2016
Megat Zulkarnain Omardin	BN (UMNO)	Appointed	10 October 2016		9 October 2019
Mohamad Ezam Mohd. Nor	BN (UMNO)	Appointed	3 May 2010		2 May 2013
Mohamad Ezam Mohd. Nor	BN (UMNO)	Appointed	26 August 2013	(Note: Took and subscribed the Oath on 26 August 2013 under S.O. 4(3). Hansard - 7 October 2013)	5 March 2014
Mohammad Anwar Mohammad Nor	BN (UMNO)	Appointed	23 April 2015	(Note: Took and subscribed the Oath on 23 April 2015. Hansard - 23 April 2015)	22 April 2018
Mohan Thangarasu	BN (MIC)	Appointed	16 November 2017	(Note: Took and subscribed the Oath on 16 November 2017 under S.O. 4(3).)	15 November 2020
Muhammad Olian Abdullah	BN (UMNO)	Appointed	9 December 2009	(Note: Took and subscribed the Oath on 9 December 2009. Hansard - 9 December 2009)	8 December 2012
Muhammad Olian Abdullah	BN (UMNO)	Appointed	10 December 2012		9 December 2015
Mustapa Kamal Mohd Yusoff	BN (UMNO)	Appointed	7 December 2016		6 December 2019
Nallakaruppan Solaimalai	MIUP	Appointed	2 November 2011		1 November 2014
Nallakaruppan Solaimalai	MIUP	Appointed	3 November 2014		2 November 2017
Ng Chiang Chin	BN (Gerakan)	Appointed	10 September 2014	(Note: Took and subscribed the Oath on 10 September 2014 under S.O. 4(3). Hansard - 1 December 2014)	9 September 2017
Ng Chiang Chin	BN (Gerakan)	Appointed	25 September 2017	(Note: Took and subscribed the Oath on 25 September 2017 under S.O. 4(3).)	24 September 2020
Noriah Mahat	BN (UMNO)	Appointed	3 May 2010		2 May 2013
Noriah Mahat	BN (UMNO)	Appointed	19 July 2013		18 July 2016
Norliza Abdul Rahim	BN (UMNO)	Appointed	30 May 2011		29 May 2014
Norliza Abdul Rahim	BN (UMNO)	Appointed	30 May 2014		29 May 2017
Ong Chong Swen	BN (MCA)	Appointed	19 February 2018	(Note: Took and subscribed the Oath on 19 February 2018 under S.O. 4(3).)	18 February 2021
Pau Chiong Ung	BN (SPDP)	Appointed			
Pau Chiong Ung	BN (SPDP)	Appointed	13 December 2010		12 December 2013
Paul Igai	BN (PDP)	Appointed	4 December 2017		3 December 2020
Paul Low Seng Kuan	IND	Appointed	21 May 2013		20 May 2016
Paul Low Seng Kuan	IND	Appointed	16 May 2016		15 May 2019
Rabiyah Ali	BN (UMNO)	Appointed	7 December 2016		6 December 2019
Rahemah Idris	BN (UMNO)	Appointed	7 December 2016		6 December 2019
Rahimah Mahamad	BN (UMNO)	Appointed	20 February 2014		19 February 2017
Rahimah Mahamad	BN (UMNO)	Appointed	31 March 2017		30 March 2020
Raja Ropiah Raja Abdullah	BN (UMNO)	Appointed	9 April 2012		8 April 2015
S. Bagiam Ayem Perumal	BN (MIC)	Appointed	22 August 2011		21 August 2014
S. Bagiam Ayem Perumal	BN (MIC)	Appointed	25 August 2014	(Note: Took and subscribed the Oath on 25 August 2014 under S.O. 4(3). Hansard - 1 December 2014)	24 August 2017
Salleh Said Keruak	BN (UMNO)	Appointed	29 July 2015	(Note: Took and subscribed the Oath on 29 July 2015. Hansard - 7 December 2015)	28 July 2018
Sambanthan Manickam	BN (AMIPF)	Appointed	25 September 2017		24 September 2020
Shahanim Mohamad Yusoff	BN (UMNO)	Appointed	16 November 2017		15 November 2020
Sim Kui Hian	BN (SUPP)	Appointed	26 May 2014		25 May 2017
Sim Kui Hian	BN (SUPP)	Appointed	5 June 2017		4 June 2020
Sopiah Sharif	BN (UMNO)	Appointed	17 July 2017	(Note: Took and subscribed the Oath on 17 July 2017 under S.O. 4(3).)	16 July 2020
Subramaniam Veruthasalam	BN (MIC)	Appointed	22 August 2011		21 August 2014
Subramaniam Veruthasalam	BN (MIC)	Appointed	25 August 2014		24 August 2017
Syed Ibrahim Kader	KIMMA	Appointed	30 May 2011		29 May 2014
Syed Ibrahim Kader	KIMMA	Appointed	30 May 2014		29 May 2017
Teo Eng Tee	BN (Gerakan)	Appointed	16 January 2018		15 January 2021
Vigneswaran Sanasee (President)	BN (MIC)	Appointed	23 June 2014		22 June 2017
Vigneswaran Sanasee (President)	BN (MIC)	Appointed	23 June 2017		22 June 2020
Waytha Moorthy Ponnusamy	HINDRAF	Appointed	5 June 2013		10 February 2014
Wilfred Yong Chen Leong	BN (MCA)	Appointed	13 April 2015	(Note: Took and subscribed the Oath on 13 April 2015. Hansard - 13 April 2015)	12 April 2018
Yahaya Mat Ghani	BN (UMNO)	Appointed	7 October 2013		6 October 2016
Yahaya Mat Ghani	BN (UMNO)	Appointed	10 October 2016		9 October 2019
Yong Wui Chung	BN (PBB)	Appointed	22 August 2017		21 August 2020
Yoo Wei How	BN (MCA)	Appointed	8 December 2014		7 December 2017
Yunus Kurus	BN (UMNO)	Appointed	30 May 2011		29 May 2014
Yunus Kurus	BN (UMNO)	Appointed	30 May 2014		29 May 2017
Zali Mat Yasin	BN (UMNO)	Appointed	8 December 2014		7 December 2017

== Death in office ==
- Norahan Abu Bakar (d. 22 September 2017)
