= Members of the Dewan Negara, 12th Malaysian Parliament =

12th Parliament of Malaysia
←	11th Parliament	13th Parliament	→

Overview
- Legislative body: Parliament of Malaysia
- Jurisdiction: Malaysia
- Meeting place: Malaysian Houses of Parliament
- Term: 28 April 2008 – 3 April 2013
- Election: Indirect election and appointments
- Website: www.parlimen.gov.my

Dewan Negara
- Members: 70
- President: Abdul Hamid Pawanteh (until 6 July 2009); Wong Foon Meng (until 12 April 2010); Abu Zahar Ujang
- Deputy President: Wong Foon Meng (until 6 July 2009); Armani Mahiruddin (until 20 December 2011); Doris Sophia Brodi
- Secretary: Zamani Sulaiman
- Party control: Barisan Nasional

Sovereign
- Yang di-Pertuan Agong: Tuanku Mizan Zainal Abidin (until 12 December 2011); Tuanku Abdul Halim Muadzam Shah

Sessions
- 1st: 29 April 2008 – 23 December 2008
- 2nd: 16 February 2009 – 22 December 2009
- 3rd: 15 March 2010 – 22 December 2010
- 4th: 7 March 2011 – 26 January 2012
- 5th: 12 March 2012 – 20 December 2012

This is a list of the members of the Dewan Negara (Senate) of the Twelfth Parliament of Malaysia.

== Elected by the State Legislative Assembly ==
Senator	Party	State	Term start	Term end
Abdul Shukor P. A. Mohd Sultan	BN (UMNO)	Perlis	2 May 2012	1 May 2015
Ahamad Yusop	BN (UMNO)	Johor	15 July 2008	14 July 2011
Ahamad Yusop	BN (UMNO)	Johor	4 July 2011	3 July 2014
Ahmad Husin	BN (UMNO)	Perlis	8 May 2006	7 May 2009
Ahmad Husin	BN (UMNO)	Perlis	6 May 2009	5 May 2012
Ahmad Rusli Iberahim	PAS	Kelantan	15 July 2008	14 July 2011
Akbar Ali	BN (UMNO)	Malacca	27 August 2008	26 August 2011
Ariffin Omar	DAP	Penang	8 June 2012	7 June 2015
Armani Mahiruddin (Deputy President)	BN (UMNO)	Sabah	20 December 2005	19 December 2008
Armani Mahiruddin (Deputy President)	BN (UMNO)	Sabah	22 December 2008	21 December 2011
Azlan Osman	BN (UMNO)	Perak	14 November 2006	13 November 2009
Azlan Osman	BN (UMNO)	Perak	16 November 2009	15 November 2012
Chandra Mohan S. Thambirajah	DAP	Selangor	17 December 2012	16 December 2015
Dayang Madinah Abang Openg	BN (PBB)	Sarawak	19 July 2010	18 July 2013
Empiang Jabu	BN (PBB)	Sarawak	28 June 2004	27 June 2007
Empiang Jabu	BN (PBB)	Sarawak	11 July 2007	10 July 2010
Gooi Hoe Hin	BN (Gerakan)	Penang	16 June 2006	15 June 2009
Heng Seai Kie	BN (MCA)	Perak	6 December 2006	5 December 2009
Heng Seai Kie	BN (MCA)	Perak	16 November 2009	15 November 2012
Hiang A Li	BN (MCA)	Pahang	8 May 2006	7 May 2009
Idris Buang	BN (PBB)	Sarawak	7 December 2005	6 December 2008
Idris Buang	BN (PBB)	Sarawak	3 December 2008	2 December 2011
Ikhwan Salim Sujak	BN (UMNO)	Selangor		
Ikhwan Salim Sujak	BN (UMNO)	Selangor	6 December 2006	5 December 2009
Johari Mat	PAS	Kelantan	7 July 2011	6 July 2014
Kadzim M. Yahya	BN (UMNO)	Sabah	22 December 2011	21 December 2014
Khairiah Mohamed	PAS	Kelantan	9 July 2012	8 July 2015
Khoo Soo Seang	BN (MCA)	Johor		
Khoo Soo Seang	BN (MCA)	Johor	13 December 2010	12 December 2013
Lee Cheam Choon	BN (MCA)	Malacca	1 September 2009	31 August 2012
Lee Chee Keong	BN (MCA)	Negeri Sembilan	20 December 2005	19 December 2008
Lihan Jok	BN (PBB)	Sarawak	7 December 2011	6 December 2014
Lim Nget Yoon	BN (MCA)	Pahang	8 June 2012	7 June 2015
Lucas Umbul	BN (UPKO)	Sabah	10 December 2012	9 December 2015
Maijol Mahap	BN (UPKO)	Sabah	6 December 2006	5 December 2009
Maijol Mahap	BN (UPKO)	Sabah	9 December 2009	8 December 2012
Mohammed Najeeb Abdullah	BN (UMNO)	Negeri Sembilan	26 April 2010	25 April 2013
Mohd Khalid Ahmad	BN (UMNO)	Perlis	6 May 2009	5 May 2012
Mohd Khalid Ahmad	BN (UMNO)	Perlis	2 May 2012	1 May 2015
Muhamad Yusof Husin	PAS	Kedah	26 May 2008	25 May 2011
Muhamad Yusof Husin	PAS	Kedah	4 July 2011	3 July 2014
Mumtaz Md Nawi	PAS	Kelantan	19 July 2006	18 July 2009
Mumtaz Md Nawi	PAS	Kelantan	6 July 2009	5 July 2012
Mustafa Kamal Mohd. Yusoff	PKR	Penang	6 July 2009	5 July 2012
Ng Fook Heng	BN (MCA)	Pahang	6 May 2009	5 May 2012
Nordiana Shafie	BN (UMNO)	Terengganu	23 December 2005	22 December 2008
Omar Faudzar	BN (UMNO)	Penang		
Omar Faudzar	BN (UMNO)	Penang	16 June 2006	15 June 2009
Ramakrishnan Suppiah	DAP	Selangor	9 December 2009	8 December 2012
Rohani Abdullah	BN (UMNO)	Terengganu	26 January 2012	25 January 2015
Roslin Abdul Rahman	BN (UMNO)	Pahang	8 June 2012	7 June 2015
Saat Abu	BN (UMNO)	Malacca	7 December 2011	6 December 2014
Saiful Izham Ramli	PKR	Kedah	4 July 2011	3 July 2014
Samsiah Samsudin	BN (UMNO)	Appointed		
Samsiah Samsudin	BN (UMNO)	Negeri Sembilan	14 December 2006	13 December 2009
Siti Rokiah Mohd. Zabidin	BN (UMNO)	Pahang	8 May 2006	7 May 2009
Siw Chun Eam	BN (UMNO)	Perlis	20 December 2005	19 December 2008
Soon Tian Szu	BN (MCA)	Malacca	26 April 2006	25 April 2009
Syed Husin Ali	PKR	Selangor	16 December 2009	15 December 2012
Syed Husin Ali	PKR	Selangor	17 December 2012	16 December 2015
Syed Shahir Syed Mohamud	PKR	Penang	8 June 2012	7 June 2015
Tunku Abdul Aziz Ibrahim	DAP	Penang	6 July 2009	5 July 2012
Wan Ahmad Farid Wan Salleh	BN (UMNO)	Terengganu	23 December 2005	22 December 2008
Wan Ahmad Farid Wan Salleh	BN (UMNO)	Terengganu	23 December 2008	22 December 2011
Wan Nordin Che Murat	BN (UMNO)	Perlis		
Wan Nordin Che Murat	BN (UMNO)	Perlis	8 May 2006	7 May 2009
Yeow Chai Thiam	BN (MCA)	Negeri Sembilan	6 May 2009	5 May 2012
Yip Kum Fook	BN (MCA)	Selangor	6 December 2006	5 December 2009
Zainun A. Bakar	BN (UMNO)	Terengganu	6 May 2009	5 May 2012
Zaitun Mat	BN (UMNO)	Pahang	6 May 2009	5 May 2012
Zaitun Mat Amin	BN (UMNO)	Terengganu	8 June 2012	7 June 2015
Zamri Yusuf	PKR	Kedah	26 May 2008	25 May 2011

== Nominated by the Prime Minister and appointed by the Yang di-Pertuan Agong ==
Senator	Party		Term start	Term end
A. Kohillan Pillay	BN (Gerakan)	Appointed	12 February 2008	11 February 2011
A. Kohillan Pillay	BN (Gerakan)	Appointed	14 February 2011	13 February 2014
Abdul Hamid Pawanteh (President)	BN (UMNO)	Appointed		
Abdul Hamid Pawanteh (President)	BN (UMNO)	Appointed	19 July 2006	18 July 2009
Abdul Rahim Abdul Rahman	BN (UMNO)	Appointed	3 May 2010	2 May 2013
Abdul Rahman Bakar	BN (UMNO)	Appointed	15 July 2008	14 July 2011
Abdul Rahman Bakar	BN (UMNO)	Appointed	18 July 2011	17 July 2014
Abdul Rashid Ngah	BN (UMNO)	Appointed	6 December 2004	5 December 2007
Abdul Rashid Ngah	BN (UMNO)	Appointed	13 December 2007	12 December 2010
Abu Zahar Ujang (President)	BN (UMNO)	Appointed	26 April 2010	25 April 2013
Amirsham Abdul Aziz	BN (UMNO)	Appointed	18 March 2008	17 March 2011
Awang Adek Hussin	BN (UMNO)	Appointed	9 April 2009	8 April 2012
Awang Adek Hussin	BN (UMNO)	Appointed	9 April 2012	8 April 2015
Azizah Abdul Samad	BN (UMNO)	Appointed	26 August 2004	25 August 2007
Baharudin Abu Bakar	BN (UMNO)	Appointed	6 September 2011	5 September 2014
Boon Som Inong	BN (UMNO)	Appointed	15 December 2010	14 December 2013
Chandrasekar Suppiah	BN (MIC)	Appointed	15 July 2008	14 July 2011
Chew Lee Giok	BN (MCA)	Appointed	13 December 2010	12 December 2013
Chew Mei Fun	BN (MCA)	Appointed	9 April 2009	8 April 2012
Chew Vun Ming	BN (MCA)	Appointed	22 February 2006	21 February 2009
Chiew Lian Keng	BN (MCA)	Appointed	2 November 2011	1 November 2014
Chin Su Phin	BN (LDP)	Appointed	4 July 2011	3 July 2014
Chiw Tiang Chai	BN (PPP)	Appointed	14 October 2005	13 October 2008
Chiw Tiang Chai	BN (PPP)	Appointed	22 August 2011	21 August 2014
Daljit Singh Dalliwal	BN (MIC)	Appointed	10 September 2008	9 September 2011
Donald Lim Siang Chai	BN (MCA)	Appointed	2 June 2010	1 June 2013
Doris Sophia Brodi (Deputy President)	BN (PRS)	Appointed	12 March 2010	11 March 2013
Fatimah Hamat	BN (UMNO)	Appointed	23 December 2008	22 December 2011
Firdaus Abdullah	BN (UMNO)	Appointed	21 January 2009	20 January 2012
Firdaus Abdullah	BN (UMNO)	Appointed	26 January 2012	25 January 2015
Gan Ping Sieu	BN (MCA)	Appointed	2 June 2010	1 June 2013
Idris Jala	IND	Appointed	1 September 2009	31 August 2012
Idris Jala	IND	Appointed	3 September 2012	2 September 2015
Ismail Md. Salleh	IND	Appointed	18 December 2007	27 August 2009
Jamil Khir Baharom	BN (UMNO)	Appointed	9 April 2009	8 April 2012
Jamil Khir Baharom	BN (UMNO)	Appointed	9 April 2012	8 April 2015
Jamilah Sulaiman	BN (PBS)	Appointed	7 November 2012	6 November 2015
Jaspal Singh Gurbakhes Singh	BN (MIC)	Appointed	2 November 2011	1 November 2014
Jins Shamsuddin	BN (UMNO)	Appointed	13 October 2004	12 October 2007
Jins Shamsuddin	BN (UMNO)	Appointed	12 February 2008	11 February 2011
Kamaruddin Ambok	BN (UMNO)	Appointed	26 August 2004	25 August 2007
Koh Tsu Koon	BN (Gerakan)	Appointed	9 April 2009	8 April 2012
Koh Tsu Koon	BN (Gerakan)	Appointed	9 April 2012	8 April 2015
Lee Sing Chooi	BN (MCA)	Appointed	2 October 2003	1 October 2006
Lee Sing Chooi	BN (MCA)	Appointed	14 October 2006	9 December 2008
Loga Chitra M. Govindasamy	BN (MIC)	Appointed	6 April 2007	5 April 2010
M. Krishnan	BN (MIC)	Appointed		
M. Malasingam	BN (MIC)	Appointed	10 March 2009	9 March 2012
Maglin Dennis D'Cruz	BN (PPP)	Appointed	2 June 2010	1 June 2013
Mariany Mohammad Yit	BN (UMNO)	Appointed	15 December 2010	14 December 2013
Mashitah Ibrahim	BN (UMNO)	Appointed	18 March 2008	17 March 2011
Mashitah Ibrahim	BN (UMNO)	Appointed	21 March 2011	20 March 2014
Maznah Mazlan	BN (UMNO)	Appointed	21 April 2008	20 April 2011
Maznah Mazlan	BN (UMNO)	Appointed	25 April 2011	24 April 2014
Mohamad Ezam Mohd. Nor	BN (UMNO)	Appointed	3 May 2010	2 May 2013
Mohd Effendi Norwawi	BN (PBB)	Appointed	16 February 2006	15 February 2009
Mohd Effendi Norwawi	BN (PBB)	Appointed	10 March 2009	9 March 2012
Muhammad Muhammad Taib	BN (UMNO)	Appointed	17 November 2006	16 November 2009
Muhammad Olian Abdullah	BN (UMNO)	Appointed	9 December 2009	8 December 2012
Muhammad Olian Abdullah	BN (UMNO)	Appointed	10 December 2012	9 December 2015
Murugiah Thopasamy	BN (PPP)	Appointed	21 April 2008	20 April 2011
Musa Sheikh Fadzir	BN (UMNO)	Appointed	13 December 2004	12 December 2007
Musa Sheikh Fadzir	BN (UMNO)	Appointed	13 December 2007	12 December 2010
Nallakaruppan Solaimalai	MIUP	Appointed	2 November 2011	1 November 2014
Nor Hayati Onn	BN (UMNO)	Appointed	14 October 2005	13 October 2008
Nor Hayati Onn	BN (UMNO)	Appointed	28 October 2008	27 October 2011
Noriah Mahat	BN (UMNO)	Appointed	3 May 2010	2 May 2013
Norliza Abdul Rahim	BN (UMNO)	Appointed	4 July 2011	3 July 2014
Osman Bungsu	IND	Appointed	2 October 2003	1 October 2006
Osman Bungsu	IND	Appointed	14 October 2006	13 October 2009
Palanivel Govindasamy	BN (MIC)	Appointed	3 May 2010	2 May 2013
Pau Chiong Ung	BN (SPDP)	Appointed		
Pau Chiong Ung	BN (SPDP)	Appointed	13 December 2010	12 December 2013
Paul Kong Sing Chu	BN (MCA)	Appointed	9 December 2009	8 December 2012
Raja Nong Chik Zainal Abidin	BN (UMNO)	Appointed	9 April 2009	8 April 2012
Raja Nong Chik Zainal Abidin	BN (UMNO)	Appointed	9 April 2012	8 April 2015
Raja Ropiah Raja Abdullah	BN (UMNO)	Appointed	9 April 2012	8 April 2015
Rawisandran Narayanan	BN (MIC)	Appointed	19 January 2007	18 January 2010
Rizuan Abdul Hamid	BN (UMNO)	Appointed	14 October 2005	13 October 2008
Rizuan Abdul Hamid	BN (UMNO)	Appointed	28 October 2008	27 October 2011
Roslan Awang Chik	BN (UMNO)	Appointed	6 December 2004	5 December 2007
Roslan Awang Chik	BN (UMNO)	Appointed	13 December 2007	12 December 2010
S. Bagiam Ayem Perumal	BN (MIC)	Appointed	22 August 2011	21 August 2014
Shahrizat Abdul Jalil	BN (UMNO)	Appointed	9 April 2009	8 April 2012
Shamsudin Mehat	BN (UMNO)	Appointed	18 December 2007	17 December 2010
Sharifah Azizah Syed Zain	BN (UMNO)	Appointed		
Sharifah Azizah Syed Zain	BN (UMNO)	Appointed	9 March 2007	8 March 2010
Sharipah Aminah Syed Mohamed	BN (UMNO)	Appointed	13 December 2004	12 December 2007
Sharipah Aminah Syed Mohamed	BN (UMNO)	Appointed	13 December 2007	12 December 2010
Sim Kheng Hui	BN (SUPP)	Appointed	18 December 2007	17 December 2010
Subbaiyah Palaniappan	BN (MIC)	Appointed	25 April 2011	18 April 2012
Subramaniam Veruthasalam	BN (MIC)	Appointed	22 August 2011	21 August 2014
Syed Ali Syed Abbas Alhabshee	BN (UMNO)	Appointed		
Syed Ali Syed Abbas Alhabshee	BN (UMNO)	Appointed	26 April 2006	25 April 2009
Syed Ibrahim Kader	KIMMA	Appointed	4 July 2011	3 July 2014
Tee Hock Seng	BN (MCA)	Appointed	15 July 2008	14 July 2011
Usha Nandhini S. Jayaram	BN (MIC)	Appointed	15 July 2008	14 July 2011
Vijayaratnam Seevaratnam	BN (Gerakan)	Appointed	22 February 2006	3 November 2008
Wan Hazani Wan Mohd Nor	BN (UMNO)	Appointed	14 October 2005	13 October 2008
Wan Hazani Wan Mohd Nor	BN (UMNO)	Appointed	3 December 2008	2 December 2011
Wan Ramlah Ahmad	BN (UMNO)	Appointed		
Wan Ramlah Ahmad	BN (UMNO)	Appointed	8 January 2007	7 January 2010
Wong Foon Meng (Deputy President) (President)	BN (MCA)	Appointed		
Wong Foon Meng (Deputy President) (President)	BN (MCA)	Appointed	7 May 2007	6 May 2010
Wong Siong Hwee	BN (MCA)	Appointed		
Yunus Kurus	BN (UMNO)	Appointed	4 July 2011	3 July 2014
Zaid Ibrahim	BN (UMNO)	Appointed	18 March 2008	17 March 2011

== Death in office ==
- Vijayaratnam Seevaratnam (d. 3 November 2008)
- Lee Sing Chooi (d. 9 December 2008)
- Ismail Md. Salleh (d. 27 August 2009)
- Subbaiyah Palaniappan (d. 18 April 2012)
