= John Ambrose =

John Ambrose may refer to:

- John Ambrose (Royal Navy officer) (c. 1701–1771)
- John Ambrose (politician) (born 1952), Malaysian politician
- John Wolfe Ambrose (1838–1899), Irish-American engineer and developer
- John A. Ambrose, American professor of medicine
