= Deputy President of the Dewan Negara =

Presiding officer of the Dewan Negara

Deputy President of the Senate
- Timbalan Yang di-Pertua Dewan Negara تيمبالن ڤريسيدن سيناتور
- Incumbent; Nur Jazlan Mohamed since 19 June 2023
- Dewan Negara
- Style: Yang Berhormat Timbalan Tuan Yang di-Pertua (formal); Tuan Timbalan Speaker/Timbalan Pengerusi (informal and within the House); Tuan Deputy President (informal and within the House)
- Reports to: Dewan Negara
- Appointer: Elected by members of the Dewan Negara
- Term length: Elected upon a vacancy
- Constituting instrument: Federal Constitution of Malaysia
- Inaugural holder: S.O.K. Ubaidulla
- Formation: 22 March 1971; 55 years ago
- Salary: MYR 264,000 annually
- Website: Parliament of Malaysia

The deputy president of the Senate (Malay: Timbalan Yang di-Pertua Dewan Negara; Jawi: تيمبالن ڤريسيدن سيناتور) is the second presiding officer or deputy speaker of the Dewan Negara, the upper house of the Parliament of Malaysia.

The deputy president of the Senate is created under Article 56 of the Constitution of Malaysia. The office is similar to the deputy speaker of the Dewan Rakyat: the president is elected by the members of the Senate and is expected to be politically impartial. If a member of the Dewan Negara is elected as the president and is a member of a state legislative assembly, he must resign from the assembly before exercising the functions of the office. As the president may hold different titles while in office, it also changes the style. The position has been held by Nur Jazlan Mohamed of the Barisan Nasional (BN) since June 2023.

== Functions ==
The main functions of the deputy president of the Dewan Negara was assists and chairs the session in the absence of the Speaker of the Senate.

== List of deputy presidents of the Dewan Negara ==
As of 22 November 2026, almost all deputy presidents of the Dewan Negara won unopposed in the presidential election except for Nur Jazlan Mohamed.

The list follow:

No.	Portrait	Name (Birth–Death)	Term of office			Party	Parliament
No.	Portrait	Name (Birth–Death)	Took office	Left office	Time in office	Party	Parliament
1		Tan Sri Datuk; S. O. K. Ubaidulla; Appointed Senator	22 March 1971	31 December 1980	9 years, 285 days	Alliance (MIC)	3rd
1		Tan Sri Datuk; S. O. K. Ubaidulla; Appointed Senator	22 March 1971	31 December 1980	9 years, 285 days	BN (MIC)	4th
1		Tan Sri Datuk; S. O. K. Ubaidulla; Appointed Senator	22 March 1971	31 December 1980	9 years, 285 days	BN (MIC)	5th
2		General (B) Tan Sri; Abdul Hamid Bidin (1918–1995); Appointed Senator	13 April 1981	28 July 1982	1 year, 107 days	BN (UMNO)	–
3		Tan Sri Datuk; Sulaiman Ninam Shah (1920–2003); Appointed Senator	14 December 1982	1 April 1985	2 years, 109 days	BN (UMNO)	6th
4		Tan Sri Datuk; Abang Ahmad Urai (–2022); Senator from Sarawak	29 July 1985	10 July 1988	2 years, 348 days	BN (PBB)	–
4		Tan Sri Datuk; Abang Ahmad Urai (–2022); Senator from Sarawak	29 July 1985	10 July 1988	2 years, 348 days	BN (PBB)	7th
5		Dato'; Tan Peng Khoon; Appointed Senator	13 July 1988	27 December 1989	1 year, 168 days	BN (MCA)	–
6		Dato'; Chan Choong Tak; Appointed Senator	28 December 1989	16 December 1990	354 days	BN (MCA)	–
6		Dato'; Chan Choong Tak; Appointed Senator	28 December 1989	16 December 1990	354 days	BN (MCA)	8th
7		Dato'; Adam Kadir; Appointed Senator	1 April 1992	12 June 1995	3 years, 73 days	BN (UMNO)	–
8		Dato'; Michael Chen Wing Sum (1932–2024); Appointed Senator	29 May 1997	5 December 2000	3 years, 191 days	BN (MCA)	9th
8		Dato'; Michael Chen Wing Sum (1932–2024); Appointed Senator	29 May 1997	5 December 2000	3 years, 191 days	BN (MCA)	10th
9		Datuk Haji; Gapar Gurrohu; Appointed Senator	8 May 2001	22 October 2003	2 years, 168 days	BN (UMNO)	–
10		Dato' Ir. Wong Foon Meng; Appointed Senator	7 June 2004	6 July 2009	5 years, 30 days	BN (MCA)	11th
10		Dato' Ir. Wong Foon Meng; Appointed Senator	7 June 2004	6 July 2009	5 years, 30 days	BN (MCA)	12th
11		Datuk; Armani Mahiruddin (born 1957); Senator from Sabah	9 July 2009	20 December 2011	2 years, 165 days	BN (UMNO)	–
12		Dato' Sri; Doris Sophia Brodi (born 1960); Appointed Senator	26 January 2012	11 March 2016	4 years, 46 days	BN (PRS)	–
12		Dato' Sri; Doris Sophia Brodi (born 1960); Appointed Senator	26 January 2012	11 March 2016	4 years, 46 days	BN (PRS)	13th
13		Datuk Seri Haji; Abdul Halim Abdul Samad (1940–2026); Appointed Senator	18 April 2016	2 November 2020	4 years, 199 days	BN (UMNO)	–
13		Datuk Seri Haji; Abdul Halim Abdul Samad (1940–2026); Appointed Senator	18 April 2016	2 November 2020	4 years, 199 days	BN (UMNO)	14th
14		Dato' Sri Dr. Haji; Mohamad Ali Mohamad; Senator from Malacca	16 December 2020	10 May 2023	2 years, 146 days	BN (UMNO)	–
14		Dato' Sri Dr. Haji; Mohamad Ali Mohamad; Senator from Malacca	16 December 2020	10 May 2023	2 years, 146 days	BN (UMNO)	15th
15		Datuk; Nur Jazlan Mohamed (born 1966); Appointed Senator	19 June 2023	Incumbent	3 years, 157 days	BN (UMNO)	–

=== Election results ===
Election date	Candidates	Votes	Nominated by	Seconded by
27 December 1962	Sheikh Abu Bakar Yahya	Unopposed	Leong Yew Koh	S. O. K. Ubaidulla
22 March 1971	S. O. K. Ubaidulla	Unopposed	Abdul Kadir Yusuf	Tan Tong Hye
6 January 1975	S. O. K. Ubaidulla	Unopposed	Abdul Rahim Manan	Lim Ah Sitt
13 April 1981	Abdul Hamid Bidin	Unopposed	Mohamed Nasir	Law Hieng Ding
14 December 1982	Sulaiman Ninam Shah	Unopposed	Mohamed Nasir	Kam Woon Wah
29 July 1985	Abang Ahmad Urai	Unopposed	Mohamed Yusof Mohamed Noor	Paramjit Singh
16 July 1987	Abang Ahmad Urai	Unopposed	Hussein Ahmad	Bee Yang Sek
13 July 1988	Tan Peng Khoon	Unopposed	Kasitah Gaddam	Hussein Ahmad
28 December 1989	Chan Choong Tak	Unopposed	Suleiman Mohamed	K. S. Nijhar
13 April 1992	Adam Kadir	Unopposed	Mahathir Mohamad	Ling Liong Sik
14 December 1994	Adam Kadir	Unopposed	Anwar Ibrahim	Ling Liong Sik
29 May 1997	Michael Chen Wing Sum	Unopposed	Osu Sukam	Ting Chew Peh
4 May 2000	Michael Chen Wing Sum	Unopposed	Abdullah Ahmad Badawi	Musa Mohamad
8 May 2001	Gapar Gurrohu	Unopposed	Abdullah Ahmad Badawi	Pandikar Amin Mulia
7 June 2004	Wong Foon Meng	Unopposed	Mohamed Nazri Abdul Aziz	Chan Chee Tee
7 May 2007	Wong Foon Meng	Unopposed	Mohamed Nazri Abdul Aziz	Abdul Raman Sulaiman
9 July 2009	Armani Mahiruddin	Unopposed	Koh Tsu Koon	Jamil Khir Baharom
26 January 2012	Doris Sophia Brodi	Unopposed	Mohamed Nazri Abdul Aziz	Koh Tsu Koon
12 March 2013	Doris Sophia Brodi	Unopposed	Mohamed Nazri Abdul Aziz	Koh Tsu Koon
18 April 2016	Abdul Halim Abdul Samad	Unopposed	Azalina Othman Said	Mustapa Mohamed
16 December 2020	Mohamad Ali Mohamad	Unopposed	Takiyuddin Hassan	Shabudin Yahaya
19 June 2023	Nur Jazlan Mohamed	43	Anwar Ibrahim	Tengku Zafrul Aziz
19 June 2023	Razali Idris	11	Dominic Lau Hoe Chai	Md. Nasir Hashim

== See also ==
- Dewan Negara
- Parliament of Malaysia
- Speaker of the Dewan Rakyat
