= Nur Jazlan Mohamed =

Malaysian politician

Yang Berhormat Senator Datuk Nur Jazlan Mohamed PGDK
- نور جزلان محمد
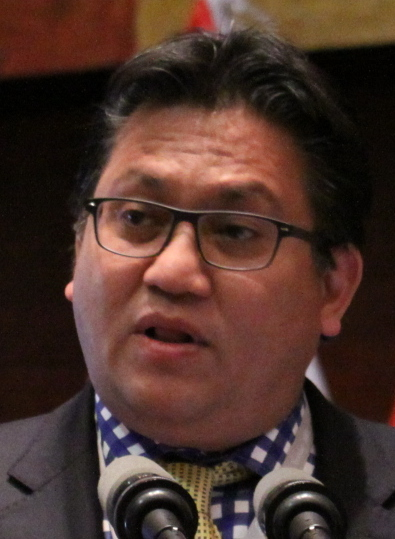

15th Deputy President of the Dewan Negara
- Incumbent
- Assumed office 19 June 2023
- Monarchs: Abdullah (2023–2024); Ibrahim (since 2024)
- President: Wan Junaidi Tuanku Jaafar (2023– January 2024); Mutang Tagal (February–May 2024); Awang Bemee Awang Ali Basah (since July 2024)
- Prime Minister: Anwar Ibrahim
- Preceded by: Mohamad Ali Mohamad

Senator Appointed by the Yang di-Pertuan Agong
- Incumbent
- Assumed office 19 June 2023
- Monarchs: Abdullah (2023–2024); Ibrahim (since 2024)
- Prime Minister: Anwar Ibrahim

Deputy Minister of Home Affairs I
- In office 29 July 2015 – 10 May 2018 Serving with Masir Kujat
- Monarchs: Abdul Halim (2015–2016); Muhammad V (2016–2018)
- Prime Minister: Najib Razak
- Minister: Ahmad Zahid Hamidi
- Preceded by: Wan Junaidi Tuanku Jaafar
- Succeeded by: Azis Jamman (Deputy Minister of Home Affairs)
- Constituency: Pulai

Chairman of the Public Accounts Committee
- In office 24 June 2013 – 29 July 2015
- Monarch: Abdul Halim
- Prime Minister: Najib Razak
- Deputy: Tan Seng Giaw
- Preceded by: Azmi Khalid
- Succeeded by: Hasan Arifin
- Constituency: Pulai

Member of the Malaysian Parliament for Pulai
- In office 21 March 2004 – 9 May 2018
- Preceded by: Abdul Kadir Annuar (BN–UMNO)
- Succeeded by: Salahuddin Ayub (PH–AMANAH)
- Majority: 34,926 (2004); 20,449 (2008); 3,226 (2013)

Personal details
- Born: Nur Jazlan bin Mohamed; 15 February 1966 (age 60) Selangor, Malaysia
- Party: United Malays National Organisation (UMNO)
- Other political affiliations: Barisan Nasional (BN)
- Spouse: Rossana Jaffar
- Relations: Jaffar Hussein (Father-in-law)
- Children: 3
- Parent: Mohamed Rahmat
- Occupation: Politician
- Website: www.nurjazlan.net

Nur Jazlan bin Mohamed (born 15 February 1966) is a Malaysian politician who has served as the 15th Deputy President of the Dewan Negara and Senator since June 2023. He previously served as the Deputy Minister of Home Affairs I in the Barisan Nasional (BN) administration under former Prime Minister Najib Razak and former Minister Ahmad Zahid Hamidi from July 2015 to the collapse of the BN administration in May 2018, Member of Parliament (MP) for Pulai from March 2004 to May 2018 and Chairman of the Public Accounts Committee (PAC) from June 2013 to July 2015. He is a member and Division Chief of Pulai of the United Malays National Organisation (UMNO), a component party of the ruling Barisan Nasional (BN) coalition. He also served as the State Deputy Chairman of UMNO of Johor. He is regarded as a vocal critic of Perikatan Nasional (PN) and its Chairman Muhyiddin Yassin.

== Personal life ==
Nur Jazlan is married and has three children. He is the eldest son of former Information Minister Mohamed Rahmat, who was of Javanese and Chinese descent. Nur Jazlan's mother, Puan Sri Salbiah Abdul Hamid, was of Teochew Chinese heritage, and associates closely with the Chinese community. He is a columnist for The Malaysian Insider.

== Education ==
Nur Jazlan is an alumnus from the South Bank Polytechnic, United Kingdom and Emile Woolf School of Accountancy, London.

== Corporate career ==
In the year 1990, Nur Jazlan was appointed one of the Administrative Executives in IGB Corporation Berhad. He stayed in IGB for a year before moving to Equatorial hotel (M) Sdn Bhd and later in 1994 he was appointed the Finance Officer for the joint venture of Proton-DRB Sdn Bhd. He stayed there up till the year 2004, where he left his corporate life to contest the 12th General Election.

== Political career ==
Nur Jazlan was elected to federal Parliament in the 2004 election for the UMNO-held seat of Pulai, previously held by Abdul Kadir Annuar. He ran for the Deputy Presidency of UMNO in 2008, citing the need for UMNO to regenerate after the 2008 election, stating, "UMNO must realise it is at the crossroads—it's a matter of life and death." His candidacy was described by former Prime Minister Mahathir Mohamad as one of a "joker". By the end of October 2008, Nur Jazlan had withdrawn from the race. In the 2013 election, he retained his seat, withstanding a challenge from senior Malaysian Islamic Party (PAS) politician Salahuddin Ayub, a local but Kelantan-based MP who switched back to Johor to seek to unseat Nur Jazlan. Days before the 2018 election, he tweeted that the postal votes would not have significant effects to the outcome of the election, in response to the complaints of delayed postal votes. However, he was defeated by Salahuddin Ayub, who then had contested as a member of National Trust Party (AMANAH) and under the Pakatan Harapan (PH) banner in the election, along with other prominent politicians from UMNO. He failed to win back the Pulai seat during the 2022 election.

=== Deputy President of the Dewan Negara ===
In June 2023, he was appointed as a Senator and later was nominated for the Deputy President of the Dewan Negara post. He was elected after winning 43-11 votes against Perikatan Nasional's nomination, Razali Idris.

== Controversy ==
In July 2015, Public Accounts Committee (PAC) chief Nur Jazlan has come under heavy fire for postponing the hearing into the 1MDB scandal from August to October.

On 31 October 2015, Nur Jazlan has called on Arul Kanda Kandasamy and Tony Pua to stop their public debate on 1MDB, to avoid the credibility and integrity of the committee being questioned by any party.

== Election results ==
Parliament of Malaysia
Year	Constituency	Candidate	Votes	Pct	Opponent(s)	Votes	Pct	Ballots cast	Majority	Turnout
2004	P161 Pulai	Nur Jazlan Mohamed (UMNO)	42,406	85.01%	Md Nasir Ab Waham (PKR)	7,480	14.99%	50,948	34,926	69.55%
2008	P161 Pulai	Nur Jazlan Mohamed (UMNO)	38,036	68.38%	Abdullah Ideris (PAS)	17,587	31.62%	56,863	20,449	71.42%
2013	P161 Pulai	Nur Jazlan Mohamed (UMNO)	43,751	51.91%	Salahuddin Ayub (PAS)	40,525	48.09%	85,924	3,226	85.51%
2018	P161 Pulai	Nur Jazlan Mohamed (UMNO)	26,523	30.52%	Salahuddin Ayub (AMANAH)	55,447	63.81%	86,893	28,924	81.77%
2018	P161 Pulai	Nur Jazlan Mohamed (UMNO)	26,523	30.52%	Mohd Mazri Yahya (PAS)	4,332	4.99%	86,893	28,924	81.77%
2018	P161 Pulai	Nur Jazlan Mohamed (UMNO)	26,523	30.52%	Yap Keng Tak (IND)	591	0.68%	86,893	28,924	81.77%
2022	P161 Pulai	Nur Jazlan Mohamed (UMNO)	31,726	27.05%	Salahuddin Ayub (AMANAH)	64,900	55.33%	117,303	33,174	70.96%
2022	P161 Pulai	Nur Jazlan Mohamed (UMNO)	31,726	27.05%	Loh Kah Yong (Gerakan)	20,677	17.63%	117,303	33,174	70.96%

== Honours ==
- Malaysia
  - Recipient of the 17th Yang di-Pertuan Agong Installation Medal (2024)
- Sabah
  - Commander of the Order of Kinabalu (PGDK) – Datuk (2000)

== See also ==
- Members of the Dewan Negara, 15th Malaysian Parliament
- List of people who have served in both Houses of the Malaysian Parliament

== Bibliography ==
- Hussien Alattas (Syed.), Perang di Parit Raja, Al-Suhaimi, 1991
