= John Ambrose (politician) =

Malaysian politician (born 1952)

Yang Berbahagia Datuk John Ambrose Dumpangol PGDK ADK JP

Senator Appointed by the Yang di-Pertuan Agong
- In office 16 January 2018 – 15 January 2024
- Monarchs: Muhammad V (2018–2019); Abdullah (2019–2024)
- Prime Minister: Najib Razak (2018); Mahathir Mohamad (2018–2020); Muhyiddin Yassin (2020–2021); Ismail Sabri Yaakob (2021–2022); Anwar Ibrahim (2022–2024)

Faction represented in Dewan Negara
- 2018: Barisan Nasional
- 2018–2019: Independent
- 2019–2020: Pakatan Harapan
- 2020: Malaysian United Indigenous Party of Sabah
- 2020–2022: Perikatan Nasional
- 2020–2024: Gabungan Rakyat Sabah

Personal details
- Born: John Ambrose; 3 March 1952 (age 74) Kampung Dabak, Donggongon, Penampang, Crown Colony of North Borneo (now Sabah, Malaysia)
- Citizenship: Malaysia
- Party: United Malays National Organisation of Sabah (Sabah UMNO) (until 2018); Independent (2018–2019); Malaysian United Indigenous Party of Sabah (Sabah BERSATU) (2019–2022); Parti Gagasan Rakyat Sabah (GAGASAN) (since 2023)
- Other political affiliations: Barisan Nasional (BN) (until 2018); Pakatan Harapan (PH) (2019–2020); Perikatan Nasional (PN) (2020–2022); Gabungan Rakyat Sabah (GRS) (since 2020)
- Spouse: Sabrina Marthen
- Parent(s): Samuel Ambrose Dumpangol (deceased); Margaret Thompson Dumpangol (deceased)
- Occupation: Politician

John Ambrose, commonly known as John Ambrose Dumpangol (born 3 March 1952) is a Malaysian politician who served as a Senator from January 2018 to January 2024. He is a Supreme Council Member of the Parti Gagasan Rakyat Sabah (GAGASAN), a component party of the Gabungan Rakyat Sabah (GRS) coalition. He is formerly a member of Malaysian United Indigenous Party of Sabah (Sabah BERSATU), a former component party branch of the GRS coalition and component party of the Perikatan Nasional (PN) coalition and formerly a member of the United Malays National Organisation of Sabah (Sabah UMNO), a branch of a component party of the Barisan Nasional (BN) coalition.

He is of Kadazan-Dusun descent and is a Christian of the Roman Catholic denomination.

== Political career ==
He served as the UMNO Division Chief of Penampang since 2004 prior to leaving the party on 13 December 2018 to joined BERSATU on 15 March 2019 and moved to Sabah BERSATU after its formation on 6 April 2019. He then left Sabah BERSATU on 10 December 2022 and joined GAGASAN on 5 February 2023.

== Honours ==
- Sabah
  - Commander of the Order of Kinabalu (PGDK) – Datuk (2007)
  - Member of the Order of Kinabalu (ADK) (2001)
  - Justice of the Peace (JP) (2026)

== See also ==
- Members of the Dewan Negara, 13th Malaysian Parliament
- Members of the Dewan Negara, 14th Malaysian Parliament
- Members of the Dewan Negara, 15th Malaysian Parliament
