= Chai Kim Sen =

Malaysian politician (died 2021)

Yang Berbahagia Dato' Chai Kim Sen DIMP AMN
- 蔡金星

Senator
- In office 23 June 2014 – 22 June 2020

Personal details
- Born: 1963 or 1964 Kuala Kangsar, Perak, Malaysia
- Died: 15 March 2021 (aged 57) Malaysia
- Citizenship: Malaysian
- Party: Malaysian Chinese Association (MCA)
- Other political affiliations: Barisan Nasional (BN)
- Children: 2
- Education: Kolej Tunku Abdul Rahman
- Occupation: Politician

Dato' Chai Kim Sen (Chinese: 蔡金星, 1963/1964 – 15 March 2021) was a Malaysian politician who served as a two-term Senator of the Dewan Negara from 2014 to 2020. A member of the Malaysian Chinese Association (MCA), he was also the party's Deputy Secretary-General, as well as the chairman of the party's Seputeh division.

== Biography ==
Chai was born in Kuala Kangsar, Perak, and studied business at Kolej Tunku Abdul Rahman (now Tunku Abdul Rahman University College). He was married and had 2 children.

== Death ==
He died on 15 March 2021 due to cancer at the age of 57. A source has reported that he never informed his cancer to others.

== Honours ==
- Malaysia
  - Member of the Order of the Defender of the Realm (AMN) (2008)
- Pahang
  - Knight Companion of the Order of the Crown of Pahang (DIMP) – Dato' (2006)

== See also ==
- Members of the Dewan Negara, 13th Malaysian Parliament
- List of politicians of Chinese descent
