= Armani Mahiruddin =

Malaysian politician (born 1957)

Yang Berbahagia Datuk Armani Mahiruddin PGDK ASDK ADK
- أرماني ماهرالدين

11th Deputy President of the Dewan Negara
- In office 9 July 2009 – 20 December 2011
- Monarchs: Mizan Zainal Abidin (2009–2011); Abdul Halim (2011)
- Prime Minister: Najib Razak
- President: Wong Foon Meng (2009–2010); Abu Zahar Ujang (2010–2011)
- Preceded by: Wong Foon Meng
- Succeeded by: Doris Sophia Brodi

Senator Appointed by the Sabah State Legislative Assembly
- In office 20 December 2005 – 20 December 2011 lapse on 20 December 2008 Serving with Kalakau Untol (2005–2006); Maijol Mahap (2006–2011)
- Monarchs: Sirajuddin (2005–2006); Mizan Zainal Abidin (2006–2011); Abdul Halim (2011)
- Prime Minister: Najib Razak
- Preceded by: Karim Ghani
- Succeeded by: Kadzim M. Yahya

Personal details
- Born: Armani Mahiruddin; 19 May 1957 (age 68) Crown Colony of North Borneo, British Empire (now Sabah, Malaysia)
- Citizenship: Malaysian
- Party: United Malays National Organisation (UMNO) (until 2018); Sabah Heritage Party (WARISAN) (since 2018)
- Other political affiliations: Barisan Nasional (BN) (until 2018)
- Relations: Juhar Mahiruddin (elder brother)
- Occupation: Politician

Armani binti Mahiruddin (born 19 May 1957) is a Malaysian politician. She created history by being the first female holder of the Deputy President of the Dewan Negara, served from 2009 to 2011. Armani is a former teacher, UMNO Women's EXCO, Head of UMNO Women's Libaran Division and Director of the Lanjut Abadi Sdn Bhd Company.

== Election results ==
Sabah State Legislative Assembly
Year	Constituency	Candidate	Votes	Pct	Opponent(s)	Votes	Pct	Ballots cast	Majority	Turnout
2020	N52 Sungai Sibuga	Armani Mahiruddin (WARISAN)	6,007	41.95%	Mohamad Hamsan Awang Supain (UMNO)	7,545	52.70%	14,318	1,538	61.43%
2020	N52 Sungai Sibuga	Armani Mahiruddin (WARISAN)	6,007	41.95%	Irawanshah Mustapa (PCS)	526	3.67%	14,318	1,538	61.43%
2020	N52 Sungai Sibuga	Armani Mahiruddin (WARISAN)	6,007	41.95%	Kamellia Hasan (LDP)	126	0.88%	14,318	1,538	61.43%
2020	N52 Sungai Sibuga	Armani Mahiruddin (WARISAN)	6,007	41.95%	Ag Damit Pg Abd Razak (USNO Baru)	114	0.80%	14,318	1,538	61.43%

== Honours ==
- Sabah
  - Member of the Order of Kinabalu (ADK)
  - Companion of the Order of Kinabalu (ASDK) (2001)
  - Commander of the Order of Kinabalu (PGDK) – Datuk (2003)
