= Wong Foon Meng =

Malaysian politician and engineer

Yang Berbahagia Tan Sri Wong Foon Meng PSM DPMT JMN
- 王茀明

15th President of the Dewan Negara
- In office 7 July 2009 – 12 April 2010
- Monarch: Mizan Zainal Abidin
- Prime Minister: Najib Razak
- Deputy: Armani Mahiruddin
- Preceded by: Abdul Hamid Pawanteh
- Succeeded by: Abu Zahar Ujang

Secretary-General of Malaysian Chinese Association
- In office 11 November 2008 – 7 April 2010
- President: Ong Tee Keat; Chua Soi Lek
- Preceded by: Ong Ka Chuan
- Succeeded by: Kong Cho Ha

Member of the Terengganu State Legislative Assembly for Bandar
- In office 25 April 1995 – 29 November 1999
- Preceded by: Harun Jusoh (APU–PAS)
- Succeeded by: Md Azmi Lop Yusof (BA–PAS)
- Majority: 1,925 (1995)

Personal details
- Born: Wong Foon Meng
- Citizenship: Malaysian
- Party: Malaysian Chinese Association (MCA)
- Other political affiliations: Barisan Nasional (BN)

Wong Foon Meng

Chinese name
- Traditional Chinese: 王茀明
- Simplified Chinese: 王茀明
- Hanyu Pinyin: Wáng Fúmíng
- Jyutping: Wong4 Fat1 Ming4
- Hokkien POJ: Ông Hut-bêng
- Tâi-lô: Ông Hut-bîng

Wong Foon Meng (Chinese: 王茀明; pinyin: Wáng Fúmíng; Jyutping: Wong4 Fat1 Ming4; Pe̍h-ōe-jī: Ông Hut-bêng) is a Malaysian politician and engineer. He is also the former President of the Dewan Negara and a former Member of the Terengganu State Legislative Assembly (MLA) for Bandar from 1995 to 1999.

== Early career ==
Wong was a civil servant in Ministry of Science, Technology and Environment from 1978 to 1990 and later became a Consulting Engineer in 1991 upon leaving the government service.

== Political career ==
Wong made his debut in the 1990 general election by contesting the Bandar, Kuala Terengganu state seat but lost. He was elected to the Terengganu State Legislative Assembly in the 1995 general election but lost his seat in the subsequent 1999 general election.

He was appointed to the Senate in April 2004, and elected as the Deputy President of the Senate in July the same year. He went on to become Senate President on 7 July 2009. His term ended on 12 April 2010, and he was succeeded by Abu Zahar Ujang.

Wong was the secretary-general for Malaysian Chinese Association (MCA) from 2008 to 2010 when he was picked by the former president Ong Tee Keat then.

== Post political personal life ==
He is currently the Chairman of Bina Puri Holdings Berhad, a Malaysian Main Market public listed company involved in construction, property development, quarrying activities and highway concession.

== Election results ==
Terengganu State Legislative Assembly
Year	Constituency	Candidate	Votes	Pct	Opponent(s)	Votes	Pct	Ballots cast	Majority	Turnout
1990	N13 Bandar	Wong Foon Meng (MCA)	3,956	37.61%	Harun Jusoh (PAS)	4,682	44.51%	10,518	726	73.20%
1990	N13 Bandar	Wong Foon Meng (MCA)	3,956	37.61%	Ng Chai Hing (DAP)	1,519	14.44%	10,518	726	73.20%
1990	N13 Bandar	Wong Foon Meng (MCA)	3,956	37.61%	Ghazali Mohamad (IND)	99	0.94%	10,518	726	73.20%
1995	N14 Bandar	Wong Foon Meng (MCA)	6,970	54.36%	Mustafa @ Hassan Ali (PAS)	5,562	43.38%	12,823	1,925	74.72%
1999	N14 Bandar	Wong Foon Meng (MCA)	6,245	46.42%	Md Azmi Lop Yusof (PAS)	6,756	50.22%	13,452	511	74.39%
1999	N14 Bandar	Wong Foon Meng (MCA)	6,245	46.42%	Ng Chai Hing (IND)	187	1.39%	13,452	511	74.39%

== Honours ==
=== Honours of Malaysia ===
- Malaysia
  - Commander of the Order of Loyalty to the Crown of Malaysia (PSM) – Tan Sri (2012)
  - Companion of the Order of the Defender of the Realm (JMN) (2001)
- Terengganu
  - Knight Commander of the Order of the Crown of Terengganu (DPMT) – Dato' (2005)
