= Doris Sophia Brodi =

Malaysian politician

Yang Berhormat Dato' Sri Doris Sophia Brodi PJN SSAP PBS MP
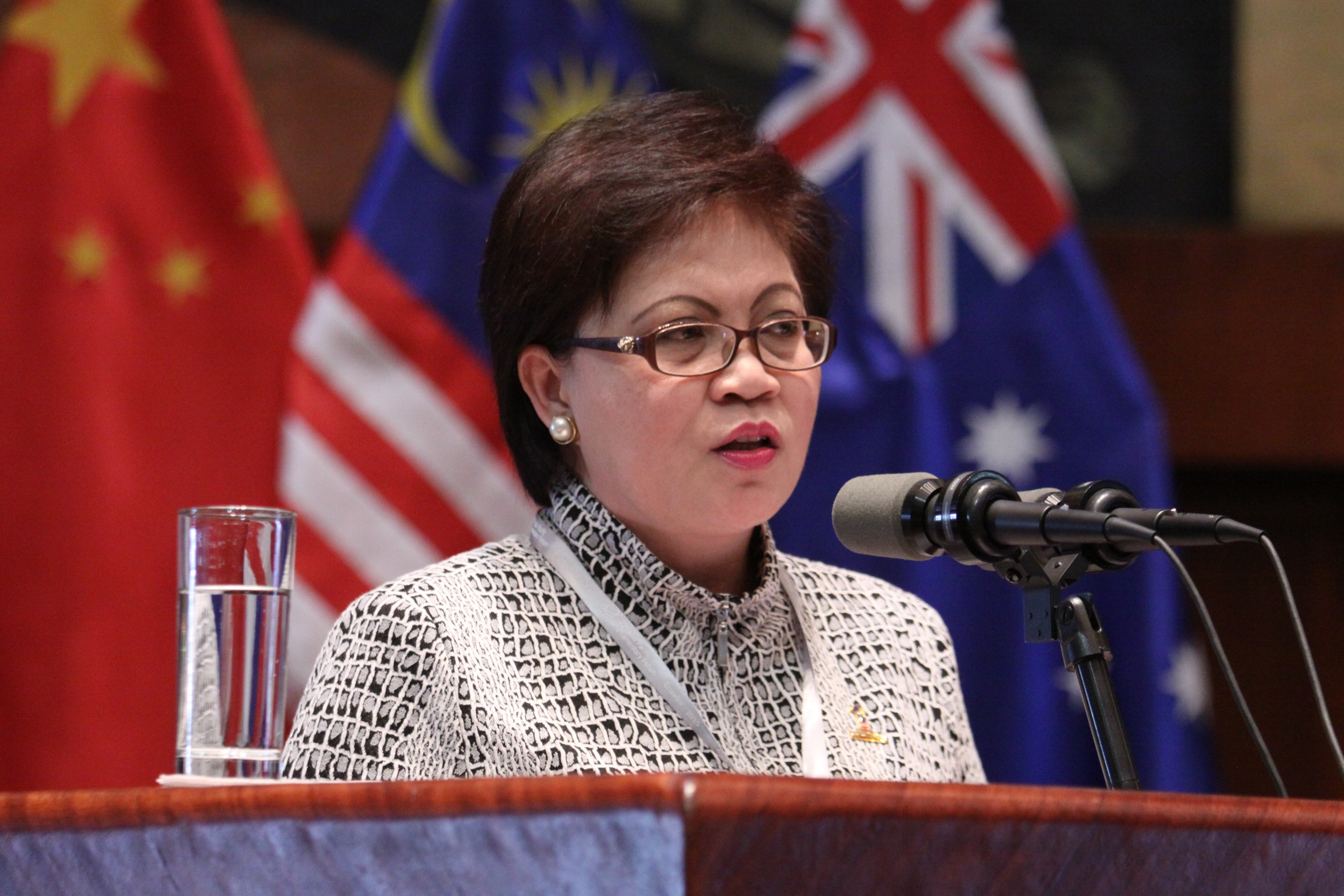
- Doris Sophia Brodi in 2015

12th Deputy President of the Dewan Negara
- In office 26 January 2012 – 11 March 2016
- Monarch: Abdul Halim
- President: Abu Zahar Ujang
- Prime Minister: Najib Razak
- Preceded by: Armani Mahiruddin
- Succeeded by: Abdul Halim Abdul Samad

Member of the Malaysian Parliament for Sri Aman
- Incumbent
- Assumed office 19 November 2022
- Preceded by: Masir Kujat (BN–PRS)
- Majority: 4,039 (2022)

Senator Appointed by the Yang di-Pertuan Agong
- In office 12 March 2010 – 11 March 2016
- Monarchs: Mizan Zainal Abidin (2010–2011); Abdul Halim (2011–2016)
- Prime Minister: Najib Razak

Personal details
- Born: Doris Sophia anak Brodi; 13 November 1960 (age 65) Sri Aman, Sarawak
- Citizenship: Malaysian
- Party: Parti Rakyat Sarawak (PRS)
- Other political affiliations: Barisan Nasional (BN) (–2018); Gabungan Parti Sarawak (GPS) (since 2018)
- Occupation: Politician

Doris Sophia anak Brodi (born 13 November 1960) is a Malaysian politician who has served as the Member of Parliament (MP) for Sri Aman since November 2022. She served as 12th Deputy President of the Dewan Negara from January 2012 and Senator from March 2010 to March 2016 respectively. She is a member of the Parti Rakyat Sarawak (PRS), a component party of the Gabungan Parti Sarawak (GPS) and formerly the Barisan Nasional (BN) coalitions.

== Election results ==
Parliament of Malaysia
Year	Constituency	Candidate	Votes	Pct	Opponent(s)	Votes	Pct	Ballots cast	Majority	Turnout%
2022	P202 Sri Aman	Doris Sophia Brodi (PRS)	14,131	44.27%	Wilson Entabang (PSB)	10,092	31.62%	32,449	4,039	63.63%
2022	P202 Sri Aman	Doris Sophia Brodi (PRS)	14,131	44.27%	Masir Kujat (IND)	5,673	17.77%	32,449	4,039	63.63%
2022	P202 Sri Aman	Doris Sophia Brodi (PRS)	14,131	44.27%	Tay Wei Wei (PKR)	2,021	6.33%	32,449	4,039	63.63%

== Honours ==
=== Honours of Malaysia ===
- Malaysia
  - Commander of the Order of Meritorious Service (PJN) – Datuk (2012)
  - Recipient of the 17th Yang di-Pertuan Agong Installation Medal (2024)
- Pahang
  - Knight Grand Companion of the Order of Sultan Ahmad Shah of Pahang (SSAP) – Dato' Sri (2016)
- Sarawak
  - Officer of the Most Exalted Order of the Star of Sarawak (PBS) (2008)
  - Recipient of the Sarawak Independence Diamond Jubilee Medal (2013)
  - Silver Medal of the Sarawak Independence Diamond Jubilee Medal (2024)
