= Vigneswaran Sanasee =

Malaysian politician

Yang Berbahagia Tan Sri Dato' Sri Vigneswaran Sanasee Thevar PSM SSAP DPSM SMS
- ச. விக்னேஸ்வரன்
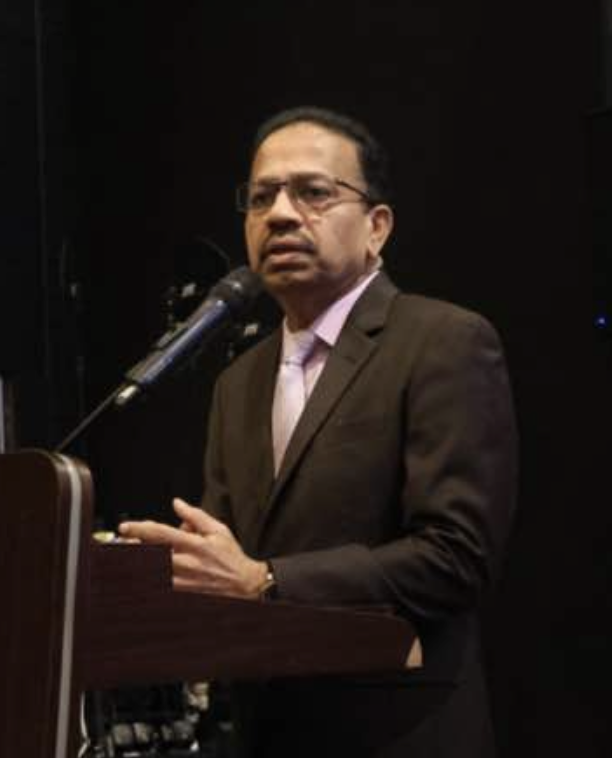

17th President of the Dewan Negara
- In office 26 April 2016 – 22 June 2020
- Monarchs: Abdul Halim; Muhammad V Abdullah
- Prime Minister: Najib Razak; Mahathir Mohamad; Muhyiddin Yassin
- Deputy: Abdul Halim Abdul Samad
- Preceded by: Abu Zahar Ujang
- Succeeded by: Rais Yatim

10th President of the Malaysian Indian Congress
- Incumbent
- Assumed office 14 July 2018
- Deputy: Saravanan Murugan
- Preceded by: Subramaniam Sathasivam

Ministerial roles
- 2004–2008: Parliamentary Secretary of Youth and Sports
- 2021–2022: Special Envoy of the Prime Minister to South Asia

Faction represented in Dewan Rakyat
- 2004–2008: Barisan Nasional

Faction represented in Dewan Negara
- 2014–2020: Barisan Nasional

Personal details
- Born: Vigneswaran s/o Sanasee Thevar; 16 December 1965 (age 60) Klang, Selangor, Malaysia
- Citizenship: Malaysian
- Party: Malaysian Indian Congress (MIC)
- Other political affiliations: Barisan Nasional (BN)
- Spouse: Susita Periasamy
- Education: Staffordshire University; University of Malaya
- Occupation: Politician
- Profession: Lawyer

Vigneswaran s/o Sanasee Thevar (Tamil: ச. விக்னேஸ்வரன், romanized: Sa. Vikṉēsvaraṉ; born 16 December 1965) is a Malaysian politician who has served as Special Envoy of the Prime Minister to South Asia since November 2021 and 10th President of the Malaysian Indian Congress (MIC) since July 2018, a component party of the Barisan Nasional (BN) coalition. He also served as 17th President of the Dewan Negara from April 2016 to June 2020, Senator from June 2014 to June 2020 and the Member of Parliament (MP) for Kota Raja from March 2004 to March 2008.

Vigneswaran is the son of the late Sanasee Thevar, JP, a former MIC parliament member in the 1980s. His cousin, Sellathevan, is a former MIC Youth leader and a Member of Parliament in 90's. His family belonged to an influential Kallar (Thevar) family and has business interests in the Port Klang area.

Vigneswaran contested and won the 2004 general election to become Member of Parliament for Kota Raja parliamentary seat from 2004 to 2008. He lost and failed to retain the seat in the 2008 general election.

Vigneswaran is also the chancellor of AIMST University.

== Political career ==
=== President of the Malaysian Indian Congress (since 2018) ===
On 27 March 2024, Vigneswaran submitted his nomination papers to contest for reelection to the MIC party presidency for the third term in the party elections. It was later confirmed that he had been reelected as president by a walkover after nobody had decided to challenge him for the position.

== Controversies ==
Vigneswaran was alleged to have violated the dress code by wearing sandals and to have breached the security regulations by encroaching into the VIP lobby area before heading to the departure gates to send off his daughter to Britain without going through proper security check and without a security pass at the Kuala Lumpur International Airport (KLIA) on 14 November 2018. Transport Minister Anthony Loke Siew Fook had showed a CCTV footage of the incident and told Vigneswaran to apologise for it during a press conference on 17 November 2018. Vigneswaran denies he breached KLIA security protocols and claims that he wore sandals as he had wound on his foot. Police will investigate the incident as the airport management had filed a police report.

== Election results ==
Parliament of Malaysia
Year	Constituency	Candidate	Votes	Pct	Opponent(s)	Votes	Pct	Ballots cast	Majority	Turnout
2004	P111 Kota Raja	Vigneswaran Sanasee (MIC)	24,376	55.24%	Siti Mariah Mahmud (PAS)	16,137	36.57%	44,758	8,239	76.67%
2004	P111 Kota Raja	Vigneswaran Sanasee (MIC)	24,376	55.24%	Krisnasamy Thevarayan (IND)	3,608	8.18%	44,758	8,239	76.67%
2008	P111 Kota Raja	Vigneswaran Sanasee (MIC)	17,879	31.64%	Siti Mariah Mahmud (PAS)	38,630	68.36%	57,323	20,751	79.74%
2022	P062 Sungai Siput	Vigneswaran Sanasee (MIC)	19,791	38.32%	Kesavan Subramaniam (PKR)	21,637	41.89%	51,649	1,846	71.34%
2022	P062 Sungai Siput	Vigneswaran Sanasee (MIC)	19,791	38.32%	Irudhanathan Gabriel (BERSATU)	8,190	15.86%	51,649	1,846	71.34%
2022	P062 Sungai Siput	Vigneswaran Sanasee (MIC)	19,791	38.32%	Ahmad Fauzi Mohd Jaafar (PEJUANG)	784	1.52%	51,649	1,846	71.34%
2022	P062 Sungai Siput	Vigneswaran Sanasee (MIC)	19,791	38.32%	R.Indrani (IND)	614	1.19%	51,649	1,846	71.34%
2022	P062 Sungai Siput	Vigneswaran Sanasee (MIC)	19,791	38.32%	Baharudin Kamarudin (IND)	598	1.16%	51,649	1,846	71.34%
2022	P062 Sungai Siput	Vigneswaran Sanasee (MIC)	19,791	38.32%	Rajah Narasaim (IND)	35	0.07%	51,649	1,846	71.34%

== Honours ==
=== Honours of Malaysia ===
- Malaysia
  - Commander of the Order of Loyalty to the Crown of Malaysia (PSM) – Tan Sri (2017)
  - Recipient of the 16th Yang di-Pertuan Agong Installation Medal (2019)
- Malacca
  - Companion Class II of the Exalted Order of Malacca (DPSM) – Datuk (2013)
- Pahang
  - Knight Grand Companion of the Order of Sultan Ahmad Shah of Pahang (SSAP) – Dato' Sri (2015)
- Selangor
  - Companion of the Order of the Crown of Selangor (SMS) (2005)

== See also ==
- List of people who have served in both Houses of the Malaysian Parliament

Political offices
Preceded by Subramaniam Sathasivam	Malaysian Indian Congress (MIC) President; 14 July 2018 - Incumbent	Succeeded by
