= Masir Kujat =

Malaysian politician

Yang Berbahagia Dato' Masir Kujat DIMP JMN

Member of the Malaysian Parliament for Sri Aman
- In office 8 March 2008 – 19 November 2022
- Preceded by: Jimmy Lim @ Jimmy Donald (BN)
- Succeeded by: Doris Sophia Brodi (GPS–PBB)
- Majority: 4,252 (2008); 6,550 (2013); 5,820 (2018)

Ministerial roles
- 2015–2018: Deputy Minister of Home Affairs

Faction represented in Dewan Rakyat
- 2008–2018: Barisan Nasional
- 2018: Parti Rakyat Sarawak
- 2018–2019: Gabungan Parti Sarawak
- 2019–2022: United Sarawak Party
- 2022–: Independent

Personal details
- Born: Masir anak Kujat; 7 August 1954 (age 71) Crown Colony of Sarawak (now Sarawak, Malaysia)
- Citizenship: Malaysian
- Party: Independent (2022–2023); United Sarawak Party (2019–2022); Parti Rakyat Sarawak (2008–2019); Parti Bangsa Malaysia (PBM) (since 2023)
- Other political affiliations: Barisan Nasional (2008–2018); Gabungan Parti Sarawak (2018–2019)
- Spouse: Dora Jemat
- Occupation: Politician

Masir anak Kujat (born 7 August 1954) is a Malaysian politician who served as the Member of Parliament (MP) for Sri Aman from March 2008 to November 2022. He has been a member of the Parti Sarawak Bersatu (PSB) since 7 March 2019. He left PSB to become an independent MP in March 2022. Masir lost his Sri Aman federal seat on the November 2022 Malaysian general election to Doris Sophia Brodie from Gabungan Parti Sarawak in a 4-way fight. He previously served as Deputy Minister of Home Affairs II in the Barisan Nasional (BN) administration under former Prime Minister Najib Razak and former Minister Ahmad Zahid Hamidi from July 2015 to the power loss of BN coalition in May 2018. He was a member of Parti Rakyat Sarawak (PRS), a former component party of Barisan Nasional (BN) and now Gabungan Parti Sarawak (GPS) coalitions, from 2008 to 2019.

== Election results ==
Parliament of Malaysia
| Year | Constituency | Candidate | Votes | Pct | Opponent(s) | Votes | Pct | Ballots cast | Majority | Turnout |
|---|---|---|---|---|---|---|---|---|---|---|
| 2008 | P202 Sri Aman | Masir Kujat (PRS) | 9,700 | 64.03% | Cobbold Lusoi (IND) | 5,448 | 35.97% | 15,513 | 4,252 | 60.31% |
| 2013 | P202 Sri Aman | Masir Kujat (PRS) | 12,168 | 54.99% | Nicholas Mujah anak Ason (PKR) | 5,618 | 25.39% | 22,409 | 6,550 | 75.23% |
| 2013 | P202 Sri Aman | Masir Kujat (PRS) | 12,168 | 54.99% | Donald Lawan (IND) | 3,867 | 17.47% | 22,409 | 6,550 | 75.23% |
| 2013 | P202 Sri Aman | Masir Kujat (PRS) | 12,168 | 54.99% | Wilfred Landong (SWP) | 476 | 2.15% | 22,409 | 6,550 | 75.23% |
| 2018 | P202 Sri Aman | Masir Kujat (PRS) | 14,141 | 61.48% | Norina Umoi Utot (PKR) | 8,321 | 36.18% | 23,379 | 5,820 | 70.81% |
| 2018 | P202 Sri Aman | Masir Kujat (PRS) | 14,141 | 61.48% | Cobbold Lusoi (PBDS) | 538 | 2.34% | 23,379 | 5,820 | 70.81% |
| 2022 | P202 Sri Aman | Masir Kujat (IND) | 5,673 | 17.77% | Doris Sophia Brodi (PRS) | 14,131 | 44.27% | 31,917 | 4,039 | 63.63% |
| 2022 | P202 Sri Aman | Masir Kujat (IND) | 5,673 | 17.77% | Walsin @ Wilson Entabang (PSB) | 10,092 | 31.62% | 31,917 | 4,039 | 63.63% |
| 2022 | P202 Sri Aman | Masir Kujat (IND) | 5,673 | 17.77% | Naga Libau @ Tay Wei Wei (PKR) | 2,021 | 6.33% | 31,917 | 4,039 | 63.63% |

== Honours ==
=== Honours of Malaysia ===
- Malaysia
  - Companion of the Order of the Defender of the Realm (JMN) (2015)
- Pahang
  - Knight Companion of the Order of the Crown of Pahang (DIMP) – Dato' (2017)
