= John A. Ambrose =

American physician

John A Ambrose
- Occupations: Professor, Doctor, researcher
- Years active: 1972–present
- Known for: Professor of Clinical Medicine at the University of California

John A. Ambrose is an American physician who is an expert in coronary artery disease. He is one of the pioneers in acute coronary syndromes (myocardial infarction and unstable angina) having published over 40 articles in the cardiology literature between 1985 and 2000 on their pathogenesis. He has also published on cigarette smoking and cardiovascular disease. Working with his PhD candidate, Rajat Barua, utilizing a novel in vitro model, they described the effects of cigarette smoking on nitric oxide biosynthesis, endothelial function, and endothelial-derived fibrinolytic and antithrombotic factors. Their 2004 update on cigarette smoking and cardiovascular disease published in the Journal of the American College of Cardiology has been referenced over 2,100 times as of 2020. Ambrose is a Professor of Clinical Medicine at the University of California, San Francisco. He was also a Director of the Cardiac Catheterization Laboratory at Mount Sinai Hospital and received a National Leadership Award from the National Republican Congressional Committee.

== Education ==
Ambrose obtained his Doctor of Medicine from New York Medical College in 1972, where he graduated first in his class. After completing his medical school training, he completed his Internship, Residency, and obtained a fellowship at Mount Sinai Hospital in New York. He rose at Mount Sinai to Professor of Medicine and Director of the Cardiac Catheterization Laboratory, a position which he led for over 14 years. It was at this time that he developed the concepts of the pathogenesis of acute syndromes which he is most noted for and wrote his most important papers in collaboration with several mentors including Richard Gorlin and Valentín Fuster.

== Research and career ==
In 1998, Ambrose joined Saint Vincent’s Catholic Medical Center in New York as the Director of the Comprehensive Cardiovascular Center. In 2005, he left New York to become Chief of Cardiology and Program Director of the Fellowship Program at UCSF Fresno in California, a position which he stepped down from in 2017. As of 2020, he continues to work full time in the Division of Cardiology and is actively involved in cardiovascular research, clinical cardiology, and teaching.

Ambrose conducted extensive research on the Pathogenesis of Acute coronary syndrome including unstable angina and myocardial infarction and the mechanisms of Coronary Thrombosis and endothelial dysfunction in Cigarette Smoke Exposure. Vulnerable plaque is another area of his research. His most recent endeavor is to help organize a new and more aggressive approach against tobacco and e-cigarettes by mobilizing medical professionals to target tobacco and electronic cigarette companies through greater advocacy and other measures.

During his tenure at the Mount Sinai Hospital in New York, he was a member of the full-time academic faculty, Professor of Medicine, as well as Director of the Cardiac Catheterization Laboratory. At Saint Vincent’s Catholic Medical Center, he was Chief of Cardiology, Medical Director of the Comprehensive Cardiovascular Center, as well as the Professor of Medicine at New York Medical College before becoming a Professor at the University of California, San Francisco in Fresno.

Ambrose has been included in most editions of “Best Doctors in America” and is a Top Doctor in Marquis Who’s Who in Medicine in 2019. Ambrose has approximately 300 publications in the medical literature, including the Journal of the American College of Cardiology, the New England Journal of Medicine, AHA Circulation, Journal of the American Heart Association, and the American Journal of Cardiology. He has also trained over 250 cardiology fellows over the past 40 years at Mount Sinai Hospital, Saint Vincent’s Catholic Medical Center and UCSF Fresno. Ambrose received the Alumni Medal of Honor from New York Medical College in 2002.

Ambrose was an accomplished classical guitarist and with his wife, they both sang professionally in New York with the Taconic Opera in Westchester and for 13 years with the Fresno Grand Opera in California.

== Awards and honors ==
Ambrose was the recipient of the 2002 Alumni Medal of Honor by the New York Medical College. Additional awards include Marquis Who’s Who and Best Doctors in America. He is a Fellow of the American College of Cardiology and has served as a President of the New York Cardiologic Society.

== Publications ==
- John A. Ambrose, Steven L. Winters, Audrey Stern et al ."Angiographic morphology and the pathogresis of unstable angina pectoris". Journal of American College of Cardiology PMID 3973257
- John A. Ambrose, Mark A. Tannenbaum, Dimitrios Alexopoulos et al. " Angiographic progression of coronary disease and the development of myocardial infarction". Journal of American College of Cardiology PMID 3379219
- John A. Ambrose and Sundararajan Srikanth. "Computed Tomographic Angiography for Localizing the Site of Plaque Disruption/Thrombus. Is Detection So Complex? AHA Journals.
- John A. Ambrose, Tushar Acharya, and Micah J. Roberts. "Finding the High-Risk Patient in Primary Prevention Is Not as Easy as a Conventional Risk Score". The American Journal of Medicine.
- John A. Ambrose, and Tushar Acharya. "Reducing Acute Coronary Events: The Solution Is Not So Difficult". The American Journal of Medicine.
