= Mohamad Ali Mohamad =

Malaysian politician and teacher

Yang Berbahagia Dato' Sri Mohamad Ali Mohamad SSAP DIMP DMSM
- محمد علي محمد

14th Deputy President of the Dewan Negara
- In office 16 December 2020 – 19 May 2023
- Monarch: Abdullah
- President: Rais Yatim
- Prime Minister: Muhyiddin Yassin (2020–2021); Ismail Sabri Yaakob (2021–2022); Anwar Ibrahim (2022–2023)
- Preceded by: Abdul Halim Abdul Samad
- Succeeded by: Nur Jazlan Mohamed

Senator Elected by the Malacca State Legislative Assembly
- In office 20 May 2020 – 19 May 2023 Serving with Lee Tian Sing (2020); Koh Nai Kwong (2020–2023)
- Monarch: Abdullah
- Prime Minister: Muhyiddin Yassin (2020–2021); Ismail Sabri Yaakob (2021–2022); Anwar Ibrahim (2022–2023)
- Preceded by: Abidullah Salleh
- Succeeded by: Mustafa Musa

Personal details
- Born: Mohamad Ali bin Mohamad; 15 March 1964 (age 62) Malacca, Malaysia
- Party: United Malays National Organisation (UMNO) (–2024); Malaysian United Indigenous Party (BERSATU) (since 2024)
- Other political affiliations: Barisan Nasional (BN) (–2024); Perikatan Nasional (PN) (since 2024)
- Education: Institut Bahasa Kuala Lumpur
- Occupation: Politician
- Profession: Teacher

Mohamad Ali bin Mohamad (Jawi: محمد علي بن محمد) is a Malaysian politician and teacher who had served as the 14th Deputy President of the Dewan Negara from December 2020 and a Senator from May 2020 to May 2023. He is a member of the Malaysian United Indigenous Party (BERSATU), a component party of the Perikatan Nasional (PN) coalition and was a member of the United Malays National Organisation (UMNO), a component party of the Barisan Nasional (BN) coalition. He served as the State Deputy Chairman of UMNO of Malacca from July 2018 and Division Chief of UMNO of Tangga Batu till March 2023.

== Political career ==
=== State Deputy Chairman of UMNO of Malacca & Division Chief of UMNO of Tangga Batu (2018–2023) ===
On 14 July 2018, Mohamad Ali was appointed the Malacca UMNO State Deputy Chairman. In the 2023 UMNO party elections on 18 March 2023, Mohamad Ali was not reelected as the Tangga Batu UMNO Division Chief after narrowly losing to Member of the Malacca State Executive Council (EXCO) and Member of the Malacca State Legislative Assembly (MLA) for Paya Rumput Rais Yasin. However, the results has been controversial and disputed by Mohamad Ali. The results also resulted in the boycott and absence of most of the committee members in the first meeting of Tangga Batu UMNO Division after Rais was elected as its new Chief, alleged sex scandal of Rais and him being replaced with Rais as the Malacca UMNO State Deputy Chairman on 22 March 2023.

=== Senator & Deputy President of the Dewan Negara (2020–2023) ===
On 20 May 2020, Mohamad Ali was elected to the Parliament as a Senator representing Malacca after being nominated and approved by the Malacca State Legislative Assembly. On 16 December 2020, he was appointed the 14th and new Deputy President of the Dewan Negara, deputising for President Rais Yatim and replacing Abdul Halim Abdul Samad. On 19 May 2023, he stepped down as Deputy President of the Dewan Negara and Senator following the expiration of his 3-year term.

=== Candidate for the Member of the Malacca State Legislative Assembly (2021) ===
In the 2021 Malacca state election, Mohamad Ali made his electoral debut after being nominated by BN to contest the Sungai Udang state seat. He was not elected as the Sungai Udang MLA after narrowly losing to Mohd Aleef Yusof of Perikatan Nasional (PN) by a minority of only 530 votes. Following his narrow electoral defeat, he filed an election petition to challenge the results.

== Election results ==
Malacca State Legislative Assembly
Year	Constituency	Candidate	Votes	Pct	Opponent(s)	Votes	Pct	Ballots cast	Majority	Turnout
2021	N11 Sungai Udang	Mohamad Ali Mohamad (UMNO)	6,259	40.24%	Mohd Aleef Yusof (BERSATU)	6,789	43.65%	15,554	530	68.24%
2021	N11 Sungai Udang	Mohamad Ali Mohamad (UMNO)	6,259	40.24%	Hasmorni Tamby (PKR)	2,035	13.08%	15,554	530	68.24%
2021	N11 Sungai Udang	Mohamad Ali Mohamad (UMNO)	6,259	40.24%	Mohd Zahar Hashim (IND)	471	3.03%	15,554	530	68.24%
2026	N14 Kelebang	Mohamad Ali Mohamad (BERSATU)	940	4.77%	Lim Ban Hong (MCA)	12,522	63.57%	19,698	7,035	72.88%
2026	N14 Kelebang	Mohamad Ali Mohamad (BERSATU)	940	4.77%	Farzana Hayani Mohd Nasir (PKR)	5,487	27.86%	19,698	7,035	72.88%
2026	N14 Kelebang	Mohamad Ali Mohamad (BERSATU)	940	4.77%	Young Jie Yu (BERSAMA)	749	3.80%	19,698	7,035	72.88%

== Honours ==
- Malacca :
  - Companion Class I of the Order of Malacca (DMSM) – Datuk (2017)
- Pahang :
  - Grand Knight of the Order of Sultan Ahmad Shah of Pahang (SSAP) – Dato' Sri (2016)
  - Knight Companion of the Order of the Crown of Pahang (DIMP) – Dato' (2013)
