= Ajis Sitin =

Malaysian politician

Yang Berbahagia Dato' Ajis Sitin DIMP
- عزيز سيتين

Senator Elected by the Pahang State Legislative Assembly
- In office 25 August 2021 – 24 August 2024 Serving with Juhanis Abd Aziz
- Monarchs: Abdullah (2021–2024); Ibrahim (2024)
- Prime Minister: Ismail Sabri Yaakob (2021–2022); Anwar Ibrahim (2022–2024)
- Preceded by: Hoh Khai Mun
- Succeeded by: Shahrol Wizan Sulong

Director-General of the Department of Orang Asli Development
- In office 2017–2019
- Preceded by: Mohd Jamalludin Kasbi
- Succeeded by: Juli Edo

Personal details
- Born: Ajis bin Sitin; 8 April 1963 (age 63) Kuala Koyan, Kuala Lipis, Pahang, Federation of Malaya
- Citizenship: Malaysia
- Party: United Malays National Organisation (UMNO)
- Other political affiliations: Barisan Nasional
- Profession: Civil engineer
- Ajis Sitin on Facebook

Dato' Ajis bin Sitin (born 8 April 1963) is a Malaysian retired civil servant and politician who had served as the Director-General of the Department of Orang Asli Development (JAKOA) from 2017 to 2019. He was appointed as a Senator on 25 August 2021 to represent Pahang.

== Honours ==
- Pahang
  - Knight Companion of the Order of the Crown of Pahang (DIMP) – Dato' (2018)
