= Siti Aishah Shaik Ismail =

Malaysian politician

Senator

Elected by Penang State Legislative Assembly
- In office 22 June 2015 – 21 June 2018 Serving with Ariffin Omar
- Preceded by: Syed Shahir Syed Mohamud
- Succeeded by: Mohd Yusmadi Mohd Yusoff

Personal details
- Born: Siti Aishah binti Shaik Ismail; 1983 (age 42–43)
- Party: Parti Keadilan Rakyat (PKR)
- Other political affiliations: Pakatan Harapan (PH)
- Education: Universiti Malaya
- Occupation: Politician

Siti Aishah binti Shaik Ismail (Jawi: سيتي عائشة بنت شيخ إسماعيل) is a Malaysian politician. She was a senator elected by the Penang State Legislative Assembly in the Parliament of Malaysia. Her term started from 22 June 2015 and expired on 2 June 2018.

== Election results ==
Parliament of Malaysia
Year	Constituency	Candidate	Votes	Pct	Opponent(s)	Votes	Pct	Ballots cast	Majority	Turnout
2013	P063 Tambun	Siti Aishah Shaik Ismail (PKR)	32,768	43.77%	Ahmad Husni Hanadzlah (UMNO)	42,093	56.23%	74,861	9,325	85.29%
2022	P058 Bagan Serai	Siti Aishah Shaik Ismail (PKR)	13,195	21.10%	Idris Ahmad (PAS)	33,753	53.98%	87,448	5,272	81.59%
2022	P058 Bagan Serai	Siti Aishah Shaik Ismail (PKR)	13,195	21.10%	Zul Helmi Ghazali (UMNO)	15,202	24.31%	87,448	5,272	81.59%
2022	P058 Bagan Serai	Siti Aishah Shaik Ismail (PKR)	13,195	21.10%	Ahmad Luqman Ahmad Yahya (PEJUANG)	383	0.61%	87,448	5,272	81.59%
