= Abdul Halim Abdul Samad =

Malaysian politician and businessman

Yang Berbahagia Datuk Seri Haji Abdul Halim Abdul Samad SMW DMSM DIMP
- عبدالحليم عبدالصمد

13th Deputy President of the Dewan Negara
- In office 18 April 2016 – 2 November 2020
- Monarchs: Abdul Halim (2016); Muhammad V (2016–2019); Abdullah (2019–2020)
- President: Abu Zahar Ujang (2016); Vigneswaran Sanasee (2016–2020); Rais Yatim (2020)
- Prime Minister: Najib Razak (2016–2018); Mahathir Mohamad (2018–2020); Muhyiddin Yassin (2020)
- Preceded by: Doris Sophia Brodi
- Succeeded by: Mohamad Ali Mohamad

Senator Appointed by the Yang di-Pertuan Agong
- In office 3 November 2014 – 2 November 2020
- Monarchs: Abdul Halim (2014–2016); Muhammad V (2016–2019); Abdullah (2019–2020)
- Prime Minister: Najib Razak (2014–2018); Mahathir Mohamad (2018–2020); Muhyiddin Yassin (2020)

Faction represented in Dewan Negara
- 2016–2020: Barisan Nasional

Personal details
- Born: Abdul Halim bin Abdul Samad; 1940 British Malaya
- Died: November 22, 2026 (aged 85–86) Kuala Lumpur Hospital, Malaysia
- Cause of death: lung infection
- Party: United Malays National Organisation (UMNO)
- Other political affiliations: Barisan Nasional (BN)
- Spouse: Iasah Ibrahim
- Education: Institut Pendidikan Guru Malaysia Kampus Kota Bharu
- Profession: Educator

Datuk Seri Haji Abdul Halim bin Abdul Samad (Jawi: عبد الحليم بن عبد الصمد) was a Malaysian politician. He was formerly the 13th Deputy President of the Dewan Negara from April 2016 to 2 November 2020 when his second senatorship term expired. He was a member of the United Malays National Organisation (UMNO), a component party of the Barisan Nasional (BN coalition. He had been Chairman of various companies.

== Honours ==
- Federal Territory (Malaysia) :
  - Grand Commander Order of the Territorial Crown (SMW) – Datuk Seri (2012)
- Malacca :
  - Companion Class I of the Exalted Order of Malacca (DMSM) – Datuk (2004)
- Pahang :
  - Knight Companion of the Order of the Crown of Pahang (DIMP) – Dato' (1996)
