= Paul Low Seng Kuan =

Malaysian politician

Yang Berbahagia Datuk Paul Low Seng Kuan PJN
- 刘胜权

Minister in the Prime Minister's Department
- In office 16 May 2013 – 9 May 2018 (Public Complaints Bureau)
- Monarchs: Abdul Halim; Muhammad V
- Prime Minister: Najib Razak
- Preceded by: Palanivel Govindasamy
- Succeeded by: Position Abolished
- Constituency: Senator

Personal details
- Born: Paul Low Seng Kuan Taiping, Malaysia
- Citizenship: Malaysian
- Spouse: Low Hung Lai
- Occupation: Civil rights activist
- Known for: Transparency International - Malaysia (TI-M)

Datuk Paul Low Seng Kuan (simplified Chinese: 刘胜权; traditional Chinese: 劉勝權; pinyin: Liú Shèngquán; Jyutping: Lau4 Sing3 Kyun4; Pe̍h-ōe-jī: Lâu Sèng-koân) is a former Malaysian Senator and former Minister in the Prime Minister's Department. He was the president of a non-governmental organisation called Transparency International - Malaysia (TI-M) until 24 May 2013. The organisation is a chapter of Transparency International (TI) - a world renowned anti-corruption NGO. After the 13th Malaysian general elections, Paul was appointed a Senator and a Minister in the Prime Minister's Department of Malaysia. His portfolio involved collaborating with relevant stakeholders including federal ministries and state governments to promote good governance practice and strengthening of transparency and accountability.

Federal institutions that worked closely with the Minister's Office included the Malaysian Anti-Corruption Commission (MACC), Malaysian Institute of Integrity (IIM), Enforcement Agency Integrity Commission (EAIC) and Public Complaints Bureau (PCB). He also chaired the National Consultative Committee On Political Financing (NCCOPF).

== Federation of Malaysian Manufacturers ==
Paul Low was also an entrepreneur and an active corporate leader in manufacturing. Before taking office as the Minister in the Prime Minister's Department, he was the Executive Director of Malaysian Sheet Glass - a large company producing glass products. He is also a past president of the Federation of Malaysian Manufacturers (FMM), an organisation that promotes Malaysian manufacturing in the international stage.In 2009, he announced that he would resign from the Malaysian Chinese Association political party to remain impartial in his fight against corruption.

== Political career ==
=== Minister in the Prime Minister's Department ===
As a minister in the Prime Minister's Department, Paul Low was in charge of the implementation of transparency in the Malaysian government. However, he appeared reluctant to comment on the 1MDB scandal, a high-profile corruption scandal that threatened to engulf the government and Prime Minister Najib Razak.

In 2018, in an interview for FMT News he said he tried to protect Malaysian Anti-Corruption Commission (MACC) officers during the 1MDB probe. He claimed he reversed the decision to transfer several MACC officers who were removed from the 1MDB investigation. However, he was not able to stop the commission from being dismantled.

Contrary to expectations, the new Pakatan Harapan Government which came into power did not completely dismantle the body of work that Datuk Paul Low had built up over his five years in office. In fact, a new National Centre for Governance, Integrity and Anti-Corruption (GIACC) was set up in June 2018 to oversee and restructure most of the Agencies that had been under his purview.

Headed by former MACC Chief Commissioner Tan Sri Abu Kassim Mohamed - who had worked closely with Low before his abrupt resignation from office in 2015 - the role of GIACC is to streamline and coordinate the implementation of key anti-corruption initiatives, which includes a new Law to regulate Political Funding.Having lost his position as a Minister with Barisan Nasional's defeat in May 2018, Low's term as a Senator also ended on May 14, 2019.

=== Political Donations and Expenditure Bill ===
In 2016 - 2017, he drafted and presented the Political Donations and Expenditure Bill, which sought to reform federal law to make all public officials liable under the country's anti-corruption laws. This would include the prime minister, cabinet ministers and members of parliament representing all political parties. According to the bill all public officers would have to declare all assets including gifts received while in office to the Malaysian Anti-Corruption Commission.

In July 2018, it was announced that the bill would be passed, and federal law amended.

== Honours ==
- Malaysia
  - Commander of the Order of Meritorious Service (PJN) – Datuk (1998)
