= Zaiedi Suhaili =

Malaysian politician

Yang Berbahagia Dato Zaiedi Suhaili PSBS PBS KMN
- زيدي سهيلي

Senator Elected by the Sarawak State Legislative Assembly
- In office 19 July 2016 – 21 July 2022 lapse on 19 –21 July 2019 Serving with Lihan Jok (2016–2017); Nuing Jeluing (2017–2022)
- Monarchs: Abdul Halim (2016); Muhammad V (2016–2019); Abdullah (2019–2022)
- Prime Minister: Najib Razak (2017–2018); Mahathir Mohamad (2018–2020); Muhyiddin Yassin (2020–2021); Ismail Sabri Yaakob (2021–2022)
- Preceded by: Dayang Madinah Abang Openg
- Succeeded by: Ahmad Ibrahim

Personal details
- Born: Zaiedi bin Suhaili; 30 December 1955 (age 70) Crown Colony of Sarawak
- Party: Parti Pesaka Bumiputera Bersatu (PBB)
- Other political affiliations: Barisan Nasional (BN) (until 2018); Gabungan Parti Sarawak (GPS) (since 2018)
- Occupation: Deputy Mayor

Zaiedi bin Suhaili is a Malaysian politician who has served as the Senator from July 2016 to July 2019 and again from April 2019 to April 2021. He is a member of the Parti Pesaka Bumiputera Bersatu (PBB), a component party of the Gabungan Parti Sarawak (GPS) coalition and formerly Barisan Nasional (BN).

He served as a civil servant for 11 years before being appointed as Political Secretary to various Federal Ministries for nine years.

He has been active in politics since 1998. He was a member of PBB Youth Satok Branch from 1988 to 1991, Youth Chief of PBB Tupong from 1992 to 1995 and Deputy Chairman of PBB Tupong in 1996.

He was also appointed as Deputy Chairman of the Padawan Municipal Council from 2014 until 2016.

He sworn in as Deputy Mayor of Kuching South City Council on 11 September 2023.

== Honours ==
- Malaysia :
  - Officer of the Order of the Defender of the Realm (KMN) (1997)
- Sarawak :
  - Commander of the Most Exalted Order of the Star of Sarawak (PSBS) – Dato (2021)
  - Officer of the Most Exalted Order of the Star of Sarawak (PBS) (2005)
