= Chandra Mohan Thambirajah =

Malaysian politician

Chandra Mohan s/o S. Thambirajah (Tamil: சந்திர மோஹன், romanized: Cantira mōhaṉ) is a Malaysian politician. He is a senator in the Dewan Negara. He served for the first term from 17 December 2012 to 16 December 2015 and the second term from 17 December 2015 to 16 December 2018.
