= Lucas Umbul =

Malaysian politician

Yang Berbahagia Datuk Lucas Umbul PGDK KMN

Senator Appointed by the Sabah State Legislative Assembly
- In office 10 December 2012 – 9 December 2018 Serving with Kadzim M. Yahya (2012–2017); Abdul Ghani Mohamed Yassin (2018)
- Monarchs: Abdul Halim (2012–2016); Muhammad V (2016–2018)
- Prime Minister: Najib Razak (2012–2018); Mahathir Mohamad (2018)
- Preceded by: Maijol Mahap
- Succeeded by: Donald Peter Mojuntin

Faction represented in Dewan Negara
- 2012–2018: Barisan Nasional

Personal details
- Born: 3 October 1960 (age 65) Tenom, Crown Colony of North Borneo
- Party: United Progressive Kinabalu Organisation (UPKO) (–2021); Homeland Solidarity Party (STAR) (2021–)

Lucas bin Umbul is a Malaysian politician. He had served as a Senator from December 2012 to December 2018. He is a member of Homeland Solidarity Party (STAR), a component party of Gabungan Rakyat Sabah (GRS) coalitions and was a member of United Progressive Kinabalu Organisation (UPKO), a former component party of Barisan Nasional (BN) coalitions. He is Sabahan of Murut ethnicity.

During the 2020 Sabah state election, Lucas Umbul was nominated by the party contest on Kemabong seat, however he failed to gain the seat with majority of 1,012 votes.

== Election results ==
Sabah State Legislative Assembly
Year	Constituency	Candidate	Votes	Pct	Opponent(s)	Votes	Pct	Ballots cast	Majority	Turnout
2020	N43 Kemabong	Lucas Umbul (UPKO)	3,202	29.23%	Rubin Balang (IND)	4,214	38.48%	10,952	1,012	72.60%
2020	N43 Kemabong	Lucas Umbul (UPKO)	3,202	29.23%	Raime Unggi (UMNO)	2,966	27.08%	10,952	1,012	72.60%
2020	N43 Kemabong	Lucas Umbul (UPKO)	3,202	29.23%	Juster Peter (LDP)	268	2.45%	10,952	1,012	72.60%
2020	N43 Kemabong	Lucas Umbul (UPKO)	3,202	29.23%	Alfred Tay Jin Kiong (PCS)	229	2.09%	10,952	1,012	72.60%
2020	N43 Kemabong	Lucas Umbul (UPKO)	3,202	29.23%	Rainus Sagulau (USNO Baru)	73	0.67%	10,952	1,012	72.60%

== Honours ==
- Malaysia
  - Officer of the Order of the Defender of the Realm (KMN) (2008)
- Sabah
  - Commander of the Order of Kinabalu (PGDK) – Datuk (2013)
  - Member of the Order of Kinabalu (ADK) (2003)
