= Ariffin Omar =

Malaysian politician

- عارفين عمر

Vice-chairman of Democratic Action Party (DAP)
- Incumbent
- Assumed office 16 December 2012

Faction represented in Dewan Negara
- 2012–2018: Democratic Action Party

Personal details
- Born: 1949 (age 76–77) Penang, Malaysia
- Party: Democratic Action Party (DAP)
- Other political affiliations: Pakatan Harapan (PH)
- Education: University of Science Malaysia (USM); National University of Singapore (NUS); Australia National University (ANU)
- Occupation: Politician, Lecturer

Ariffin S.M Omar is a Malaysian politician who is a Vice Chairman of the Democratic Action Party (DAP), a component party of Pakatan Harapan (PH) coalition. He served as a senator elected by the Penang State Legislative Assembly in the Parliament of Malaysia from 2 June 2015 to 2 June 2018.

== Personal life and education ==
Ariffin Omar studied at St Xavier's Institution, Penang for his secondary school education. He then continued to study at Universiti Sains Malaysia (USM) and later obtained a Bachelor's degree at the National University of Singapore (NUS) and in 1990, obtained a Doctorate degree from the Australia National University (ANU).

He worked as a lecturer in Universiti Sains Malaysia (1974–2006) and a lecturer at the University of Utah (1998) and was also a lecturer in Universiti Utara Malaysia and the National Defence University of Malaysia.

He was also a founding member of Aliran Kesedaran Negara (Aliran), a reform movement dedicated to justice, freedom and solidarity.

Now based at the Penang Institute, his research focuses on nation, nationalism, ethnic relations and religious freedom.

== Works ==
- Bangsa Melayu (Malay Concepts of Democracy and Community, 1945–1950); Oxford University Press, 1993
- The Bumiputera Policy: Dynamics and Dilemmas; Penerbit Universiti Sains Malaysia, 2005
