= Abu Zahar Ujang =

Malaysian politician

Yang Berbahagia Tan Sri Abu Zahar Ujang PSM SUNS DSNS AMN
- أبو ظهر نيکا اوجڠ
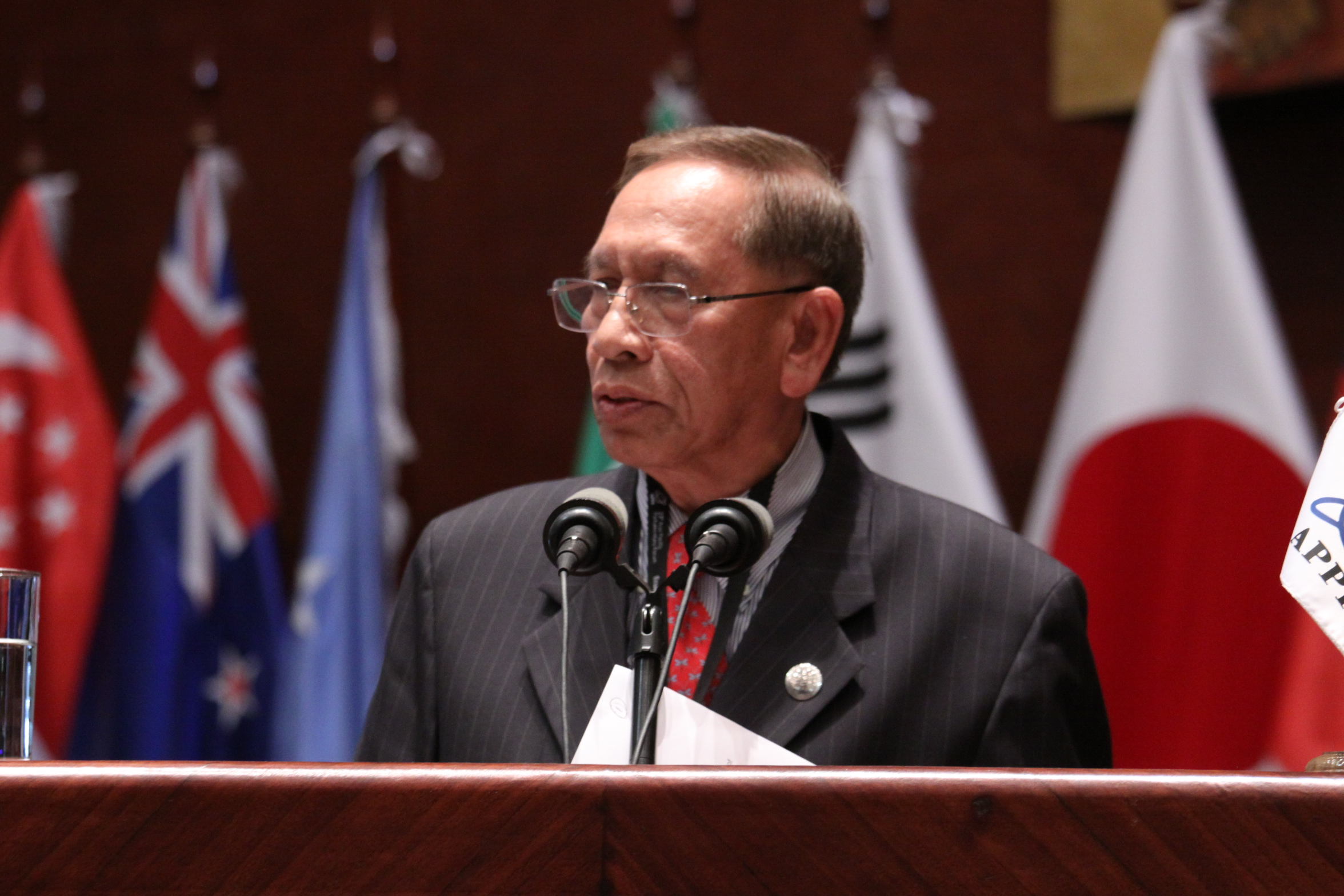
- Abu Zahar in 2015

16th President of the Dewan Negara
- In office 26 April 2010 – 25 April 2016
- Monarchs: Mizan Zainal Abidin; Abdul Halim
- Prime Minister: Najib Razak
- Preceded by: Wong Foon Meng
- Succeeded by: Vigneswaran Sanasee

Member of the Malaysian Parliament for Kuala Pilah
- In office 25 April 1995 – 29 November 1999
- Preceded by: Napsiah Omar (UMNO–BN)
- Succeeded by: Napsiah Omar (UMNO–BN)

Member of the Negeri Sembilan State Legislative Assembly for Pilah
- In office 3 August 1986 – 25 April 1995
- Preceded by: Ramli Ujang (UMNO–BN)
- Succeeded by: Napsiah Omar (UMNO–BN)

Chairman of the Advisory Board of Malaysian Anti-Corruption Commission
- Incumbent
- Assumed office 21 May 2020
- Chief Commissioner: Azam Baki

Personal details
- Born: Abu Zahar bin Ujang; 1 February 1944 (age 82) Kuala Pilah, Negeri Sembilan, Japanese occupation of Malaya (now Malaysia)
- Citizenship: Malaysian
- Party: United Malay National Organisation (UMNO)―Barisan Nasional
- Spouse: Sharifah Rugayah Syed Jaffar
- Children: 3
- Education: Lincoln's Inn
- Occupation: Lawyer

Abu Zahar bin Ujang (born 1 February 1944) is a Malaysian politician who has served as the Chairman of the Advisory Board of Malaysian Anti-Corruption Commission (MACC) under Chief Commissioner Azam Baki since May 2020. He was also the President of the Dewan Negara from April 2010 to April 2016 for six years and Member of Parliament (MP) for Kuala Pilah from April 1995 to November 1999 for a term.

Abu Zahar served in the State Assembly of Negeri Sembilan from 1986 to 1995, before being a member of federal Parliament from 1995 to 1999. After retiring, he became president of the Council of Former Elected Representatives (Mubarak).

He was sworn in as President of the Senate on 26 April 2010.

== Election results ==
Negeri Sembilan State Legislative Assembly
Year	Constituency	Candidate	Votes	Pct	Opponent(s)	Votes	Pct	Ballots cast	Majority	Turnout
1986	N15 Pilah	Abu Zahar Ujang (UMNO)	4,824	67.15%	Tong Kin Chong (DAP)	2,316	32.24%	7,819	2,508	70.58%
1986	N15 Pilah	Abu Zahar Ujang (UMNO)	4,824	67.15%	Khairudin Daud (PAS)	444	6.18%	7,819	2,508	70.58%
1990	N15 Pilah	Abu Zahar Ujang (UMNO)	6,135	67.49%	Abu Samail Katas (S46)	2,955	32.51%	9,371	3,180	73.34%

Parliament of Malaysia
Year	Constituency	Candidate	Votes	Pct	Opponent(s)	Votes	Pct	Ballots cast	Majority	Turnout
1995	P116 Kuala Pilah	Abu Zahar Ujang (UMNO)	24,485	86.31%	Mohd Yusof Abd Malik (S46)	3,885	13.69%	29,704	20,600	69.29%

== Honours ==
=== Honours of Malaysia ===
- Malaysia
  - Member of the Order of the Defender of the Realm (AMN) (1992)
  - Commander of the Order of Loyalty to the Crown of Malaysia (PSM) – Tan Sri (2007)
- Negeri Sembilan
  - Knight Companion of the Order of Loyalty to Negeri Sembilan (DSNS) – Dato' (1996)
  - Principal Grand Knight of the Order of Loyalty to Negeri Sembilan (SUNS) – Dato' Seri Utama (2013)
