= List of members of the Dewan Negara =

This is a complete list of members of the Dewan Negara, upper house of the Parliament of Malaysia.

- Members of the Dewan Negara, 1st Malayan Parliament; 1959–1964
- Members of the Dewan Negara, 2nd Malaysian Parliament; 1964–1969
- Members of the Dewan Negara, 3rd Malaysian Parliament; 1971–1974
- Members of the Dewan Negara, 4th Malaysian Parliament; 1975–1978
- Members of the Dewan Negara, 5th Malaysian Parliament; 1978–1982
- Members of the Dewan Negara, 6th Malaysian Parliament; 1982–1985
- Members of the Dewan Negara, 7th Malaysian Parliament; 1986–1990
- Members of the Dewan Negara, 8th Malaysian Parliament; 1990–1994
- Members of the Dewan Negara, 9th Malaysian Parliament; 1995–1999
- Members of the Dewan Negara, 10th Malaysian Parliament; 1999–2003
- Members of the Dewan Negara, 11th Malaysian Parliament; 2004–2007
- Members of the Dewan Negara, 12th Malaysian Parliament; 2008–2012
- Members of the Dewan Negara, 13th Malaysian Parliament; 2013–2018
- Members of the Dewan Negara, 14th Malaysian Parliament; 2018–2022
- Members of the Dewan Negara, 15th Malaysian Parliament; 2022–present
