= Members of the Dewan Negara, 9th Malaysian Parliament =

9th Parliament of Malaysia
←	8th Parliament	10th Parliament	→

Overview
- Legislative body: Parliament of Malaysia
- Jurisdiction: Malaysia
- Meeting place: Malaysian Houses of Parliament
- Term: 7 June 1995 – 11 November 1999
- Election: Indirect election and appointments
- Website: www.parlimen.gov.my

Dewan Negara
- Members: 69
- President: Vadiveloo Govindasamy (until 12 June 1995); Adam Kadir (until 30 November 1996); Mohamed Yaacob
- Deputy President: Adam Kadir (until 12 June 1995); Michael Chen Wing Sum
- Secretary: Mohamad Salleh Abu Bakar (until 1996); Abdullah Abdul Wahab
- Party control: Barisan Nasional

Sovereign
- Yang di-Pertuan Agong: Tuanku Jaafar (until 25 April 1999); Tuanku Salahuddin Abdul Aziz Shah

Sessions
- 1st: 8 June 1995 – 28 December 1995
- 2nd: 25 March 1996 – 24 December 1996
- 3rd: 24 March 1997 – 22 December 1997
- 4th: 23 March 1998 – 17 December 1998
- 5th: 5 April 1999 – 3 August 1999

This is a list of the members of the Dewan Negara (Senate) of the Ninth Parliament of Malaysia.

== Elected by the State Legislative Assembly ==
Senator	Party	State	Term start	Term end
Abdillah Abdul Rahim	BN (PBB)	Sarawak	11 December 1996	10 December 1999
Abdul Majid Baba	BN (UMNO)	Malacca	14 May 1996	13 May 1999
Abdul Malek Abdul Ghani	BN (UMNO)	Perlis	3 May 1999	2 May 2002
Abdul Rashid Ismail	BN (UMNO)	Penang	19 March 1990	18 March 1993
Ahmad Ismail	BN (UMNO)	Penang	16 December 1996	15 December 1999
Bakri Ali Mahamad	BN (UMNO)	Kedah	13 December 1995	12 December 1998
Bakri Ali Mahamad	BN (UMNO)	Kedah	7 December 1998	6 December 2001
Chet Singh Karam Singh	BN (Gerakan)	Penang	4 September 1995	3 September 1998
Chet Singh Karam Singh	BN (Gerakan)	Penang	16 December 1996	15 December 1999
Chin Kon Tow @ Chin Kong Too	BN (MCA)	Malacca	5 August 1996	4 August 1999
Chong Chi Siong	BN (MCA)	Negeri Sembilan	25 August 1989	24 August 1992
Christina Lorline Tibok @ Christine Vanhouten	BN (PDS)	Sabah		
Dol Dollah	BN (UMNO)	Malacca	19 December 1989	18 December 1992
Frankie Chong Yu Chee	BN (SAPP)	Sabah	17 December 1990	16 December 1993
Frankie Chong Yu Chee	BN (SAPP)	Sabah	9 May 1994	8 May 1997
Ghazi @ Hasbullah Ramli	BN (UMNO)	Selangor	11 August 1997	10 August 2000
Hanipah Ahmad	BN (UMNO)	Perlis	19 April 1993	18 April 1996
Hanipah Ahmad	BN (UMNO)	Perlis	14 May 1996	13 May 1999
Hunaizah Mohd. Noor	PAS	Kelantan	4 August 1997	3 August 2000
Ibrahim Daud	BN (UMNO)	Johor	19 April 1993	18 April 1996
Ibrahim Daud	BN (UMNO)	Johor	14 May 1996	13 May 1999
Jamaluddin Ahmad	BN (UMNO)	Negeri Sembilan	18 February 1991	17 February 1994
Jamaluddin Ahmad	BN (UMNO)	Negeri Sembilan	9 May 1994	8 May 1997
Jamilah Ibrahim	PAS	Kelantan	4 August 1997	3 August 2000
Janggu Banyang	BN (PBB)	Sarawak	13 December 1993	12 December 1996
Janggu Banyang	BN (PBB)	Sarawak	11 December 1996	10 December 1999
Jinuin Jimin	BN (PDS)	Sabah	4 August 1997	12 July 1998
Kalthom Othman	PAS	Kelantan	24 July 1991	23 July 1994
Kalthom Othman	PAS	Kelantan	9 May 1994	8 May 1997
Kelsom Yaacub	BN (UMNO)	Pahang	13 December 1993	12 December 1996
Khadijah Awang	BN (UMNO)	Terengganu	14 May 1996	13 May 1999
Kian Sit Har	BN (MCA)	Malacca	19 April 1993	18 April 1996
M. Zeevill @ Shanmugam a/l R.M.S. Mutaya	BN (MIC)	Selangor	11 August 1994	10 August 1997
Lee Pit Chern	BN (MCA)	Negeri Sembilan	19 May 1999	18 May 2002
Low Kai Meng	BN (MCA)	Perak	14 December 1994	13 December 1997
Mazlan Abu	BN (UMNO)	Johor	2 August 1999	1 August 2002
Mohd Zain Mat Daud	PAS	Kelantan	24 July 1991	23 July 1994
Mohd Zain Mat Daud	PAS	Kelantan	9 May 1994	8 May 1997
Mustaffa Kamal Mohd. Nawi	BN (UMNO)	Perak	9 November 1995	8 November 1998
Mustaffa Kamal Mohd. Nawi	BN (UMNO)	Perak	4 August 1997	3 August 2000
Ng See Tiong	BN (MCA)	Johor	9 May 1994	8 May 1997
Ng Yen Yen	BN (MCA)	Pahang	13 December 1993	12 December 1996
Parasuraman Sanasamy	BN (MIC)	Kedah	6 October 1997	5 October 2000
Rahmah Salleh	BN (UMNO)	Terengganu		
Ramlah Abas	BN (UMNO)	Malacca	3 May 1999	2 May 2002
Ramlah Kassim	BN (UMNO)	Pahang	6 September 1996	5 September 1999
Saidin Mohamad	BN (UMNO)	Perlis	19 December 1989	18 December 1992
Sairin Karno	BN (UMNO)	Sabah	4 September 1995	3 September 1998
Sairin Karno	BN (UMNO)	Sabah	26 November 1996	25 November 1999
Salleh @ Hassan Ali	BN (UMNO)	Terengganu	24 May 1993	23 May 1996
Salleh @ Hassan Ali	BN (UMNO)	Terengganu	29 October 1996	28 October 1999
Shuib Endut	BN (UMNO)	Kedah	19 December 1989	18 December 1992
Shuib Endut	BN (UMNO)	Kedah	16 December 1992	15 December 1995
Tan Ah Eng	BN (MCA)	Johor	12 May 1997	11 May 2000
Tan Ek Huat	BN (MCA)	Perak	6 October 1997	5 October 2000
Tan Son Lee	BN (MCA)	Kedah	14 December 1994	13 December 1997
Tee Thiong Hock	BN (MCA)	Selangor	11 August 1997	10 August 2000
Wan Hamid Edruce Tuanku Mohamad	BN (PBB)	Sarawak	17 December 1990	16 December 1993
Wan Hamid Edruce Tuanku Mohamad	BN (PBB)	Sarawak	13 December 1993	12 December 1996
Yeow Seng Huat	BN (MCA)	Pahang	16 December 1996	15 December 1999
Yim Chee Chong	BN (MCA)	Negeri Sembilan	14 May 1996	13 May 1999
Zainal Md. Derus	BN (UMNO)	Selangor	5 August 1991	4 August 1994
Zainal Md. Derus	BN (UMNO)	Selangor	11 August 1994	10 August 1997
Zakaria Arshad	BN (UMNO)	Negeri Sembilan	11 August 1997	10 August 2000

== Nominated by the Prime Minister and appointed by the Yang di-Pertuan Agong ==
Senator	Party		Term start	Term end
Abdul Aziz Abdul Rahman	BN (UMNO)	Appointed	4 September 1995	3 September 1998
Abdul Salam Awang	BN (UMNO)	Appointed	18 February 1991	17 February 1994
Abdul Salam Awang	BN (UMNO)	Appointed	20 July 1994	19 July 1997
Abdul Wahid Vartan Syed Ghany	BN (UMNO)	Appointed	5 February 1998	4 February 2001
Adam Kadir (Deputy President) (President)	BN (UMNO)	Appointed	17 December 1990	16 December 1993
Adam Kadir (Deputy President) (President)	BN (UMNO)	Appointed	9 December 1993	8 December 1996
Charern Intachat	BN (UMNO)	Appointed	14 May 1996	13 May 1999
Charern Intachat	BN (UMNO)	Appointed	19 May 1999	18 May 2002
Charlie Chau-Lap Chang	BN (MCA)	Appointed	27 July 1999	26 July 2002
Che Jam Haron	BN (UMNO)	Appointed	27 July 1999	26 July 2002
Chew Poh Thoi	BN (MCA)	Appointed		
Chong Kah Kiat	BN (LDP)	Appointed	14 December 1994	13 December 1997
Chong Kah Kiat	BN (LDP)	Appointed	18 August 1997	17 August 2000
David Yeoh Eng Hock	BN (MCA)	Appointed	19 October 1989	18 October 1992
David Yeoh Eng Hock	BN (MCA)	Appointed	27 October 1992	26 October 1995
Ding Seling	BN (PBB)	Appointed	16 December 1991	15 December 1994
Ding Seling	BN (PBB)	Appointed	14 December 1994	13 December 1997
Eng Hoi Choo	BN (MCA)	Appointed	4 September 1995	3 September 1998
Eng Hoi Choo	BN (MCA)	Appointed	7 April 1997	6 April 2000
Faridah Abu Hassan	BN (UMNO)	Appointed	4 September 1995	3 September 1998
Gapar Gurrohu	BN (UMNO)	Appointed	6 October 1997	5 October 2000
Geoffrey Yee Lung Fook	BN (SAPP)	Appointed	9 March 1998	8 March 2001
Ghazali Embong	BN (UMNO)	Appointed	24 July 1991	23 July 1994
Ghazali Embong	BN (UMNO)	Appointed	20 July 1994	19 July 1997
Habshah Osman	BN (UMNO)	Appointed	27 October 1992	26 October 1995
Habshah Osman	BN (UMNO)	Appointed	4 September 1995	3 September 1998
Hamzah Mohamed Zain	BN (UMNO)	Appointed	4 September 1995	3 September 1998
Hamzah Mohamed Zain	BN (UMNO)	Appointed	5 February 1998	4 February 2001
Hashim Safin	BN (UMNO)	Appointed	4 September 1995	3 September 1998
Hashim Safin	BN (UMNO)	Appointed	12 May 1997	11 May 2000
Ibrahim Ali	BN (UMNO)	Appointed	4 September 1995	3 September 1998
Ibrahim Ali	BN (UMNO)	Appointed	29 October 1996	28 October 1999
Isli Siput	BN (UMNO)	Appointed		
Isli Siput	BN (UMNO)	Appointed	20 December 1993	19 December 1996
Itam Wali Nawan	IND	Appointed		
Itam Wali Nawan	IND	Appointed	20 December 1993	19 December 1996
Jang Chow Thye @ Yio Chow Thye	BN (Gerakan)	Appointed	14 May 1996	13 May 1999
Jang Chow Thye @ Yio Chow Thye	BN (Gerakan)	Appointed	19 May 1999	18 May 2002
Jaya Partiban	BN (MIC)	Appointed		
Johan Ghani	BN (UMNO)	Appointed	24 July 1991	23 July 1994
Johan Ghani	BN (UMNO)	Appointed	14 December 1994	13 December 1997
Joseph Balan Seling	BN (PBB)	Appointed		
K. Vijayanathan Kesava Pillai	BN (MIC)	Appointed	18 February 1991	17 February 1994
K. Vijayanathan Kesava Pillai	BN (MIC)	Appointed	16 December 1992	15 December 1995
Kamilia Ibrahim	BN (UMNO)	Appointed	4 September 1995	3 September 1998
Kamilia Ibrahim	BN (UMNO)	Appointed	7 April 1997	6 April 2000
Kan Kok Wan	BN (MCA)	Appointed	6 June 1995	5 June 1998
Kasim Md. Yusop	BN (UMNO)	Appointed		
Kasitah Gaddam	BN (UMNO)	Appointed		
Khoo Keok Hai	BN (MCA)	Appointed	14 May 1996	13 May 1999
Khoo Lay Hin	BN (MCA)	Appointed	14 May 1996	13 May 1999
Khoo Lay Hin	BN (MCA)	Appointed	18 May 1998	17 May 2001
Krishnan Permual	BN (MIC)	Appointed	9 November 1995	8 November 1998
Krishnan Permual	BN (MIC)	Appointed	7 April 1997	6 April 2000
Long Jidin	IND	Appointed	26 May 1997	25 May 2000
M. G. Pandithan	IPF	Appointed	4 September 1995	3 September 1998
Maidom Pansai		Appointed	4 September 1995	3 September 1998
Marimuthu Nadeson	BN (MIC)	Appointed		
Marimuthu Nadeson	BN (MIC)	Appointed	9 March 1998	8 March 2001
Mastika Junaidah Husin	BN (UMNO)	Appointed	14 December 1994	13 December 1997
Mastika Junaidah Husin	BN (UMNO)	Appointed	9 March 1998	8 March 2001
Melanie Chua Chui Ket	BN (SAPP)	Appointed	2 August 1999	1 August 2002
Michael Bong Thiam Joon	BN (SNAP)	Appointed	5 August 1992	4 August 1995
Michael Chen Wing Sum (Deputy President)	BN (Gerakan)	Appointed	7 April 1997	6 April 2000
Mohamed Yaacob (President)	BN (UMNO)	Appointed	10 December 1996	9 December 1999
Mohd Khalil Yaakob	BN (UMNO)	Appointed	24 May 1999	23 May 2002
Ng Thian Hock	BN (MCA)	Appointed	24 July 1991	23 July 1994
Nor Azah Awin	BN (UMNO)	Appointed	27 July 1999	26 July 2002
Norjan Khan Bahadar	BN (UMNO)	Appointed	4 December 1997	3 December 2000
Norsimah Hashim	BN (UMNO)	Appointed	27 July 1999	26 July 2002
Othman Yunos	BN (UMNO)	Appointed	20 July 1994	19 July 1997
Pandikar Amin Mulia	BN (AKAR)	Appointed	24 May 1999	23 May 2002
Pandikar Amin Mulia	BN (UMNO)	Appointed	24 May 1999	23 May 2002
Puizah Abu Kassim	BN (UMNO)	Appointed	2 August 1999	1 August 2002
Rahaiah Baheran	BN (UMNO)	Appointed	27 October 1992	26 October 1995
Rahaiah Baheran	BN (UMNO)	Appointed	4 September 1995	3 September 1998
Rahim Baba	BN (UMNO)	Appointed	16 December 1991	15 December 1994
Rahim Baba	BN (UMNO)	Appointed	14 December 1994	13 December 1997
Rosli Mat Hassan	BN (UMNO)	Appointed	26 May 1997	25 May 2000
Saad Man	BN (UMNO)	Appointed	24 July 1991	23 July 1994
Saad Man	BN (UMNO)	Appointed	6 June 1995	5 June 1998
Sarasa Velu	BN (MIC)	Appointed	16 December 1992	15 December 1995
Sarasa Velu	BN (MIC)	Appointed	20 March 1996	19 March 1999
Selemiah Hashim	BN (UMNO)	Appointed	19 April 1993	18 April 1996
Selemiah Hashim	BN (UMNO)	Appointed	30 July 1996	29 July 1999
Siti Hawa @ Karimah Mohd. Nor	BN (UMNO)	Appointed	12 August 1998	11 August 2001
Soong Siew Hoong	BN (Gerakan)	Appointed		
T. Marimuthu	BN (MIC)	Appointed	14 May 1996	13 May 1999
T. Marimuthu	BN (MIC)	Appointed	19 May 1999	18 May 2002
Tan Swee Hueng	BN (MCA)	Appointed	30 July 1996	29 July 1999
Ting Chek Sii	BN (MCA)	Appointed		
Ting Chek Sii	BN (MCA)	Appointed	12 May 1998	11 May 2001
V. K. K. Teagarajan	BN (MIC)	Appointed	14 December 1994	13 December 1997
V. K. K. Teagarajan	BN (MIC)	Appointed	6 October 1997	5 October 2000
Vadiveloo Govindasamy (President)	BN (MIC)	Appointed	16 December 1991	15 December 1994
Vadiveloo Govindasamy (President)	BN (MIC)	Appointed	14 December 1994	13 December 1997
Wan Asiah Ahmad	BN (UMNO)	Appointed	11 November 1997	10 November 2000
Wan Intan Wan Ahmad Tajuddin	BN (UMNO)	Appointed	27 October 1992	26 October 1995
Wan Intan Wan Ahmad Tajuddin	BN (UMNO)	Appointed	4 September 1995	3 September 1998
William Lau Kung Hui	BN (SNAP)	Appointed		
Zainal Rampak	BN (UMNO)	Appointed	7 December 1998	6 December 2001
Zainol Abidin Johari	BN (UMNO)	Appointed		
Zainol Abidin Johari	BN (UMNO)	Appointed	29 October 1996	20 July 1998
Zainuddin Maidin	BN (UMNO)	Appointed	9 March 1998	8 March 2001
Zaleha Husin	BN (UMNO)	Appointed	13 April 1992	12 April 1995
Zuki Kamaluddin	BN (UMNO)	Appointed	4 September 1995	3 September 1998
Zuki Kamaluddin	BN (UMNO)	Appointed	6 September 1996	5 September 1999

== Death in office ==
- Jinuin Jimin (d. 12 July 1998)
- Zainol Abidin Johari (d. 20 July 1998)
