= President of the Dewan Negara =

Presiding officer of the Dewan Negara

President of the Senate
- Yang di-Pertua Dewan Negara يڠ دڤرتوا ديوان نڬارا
- Incumbent; Awang Bemee Awang Ali Basah since 22 July 2024
- Dewan Negara
- Style: Yang Berhormat Tuan Yang di-Pertua (formal); Tuan Speaker/Pengurusi (informal and within the House); Tuan President (informal and within the House)
- Member of: Committee of Selection, Standing Orders Committee, House Committee, Committee of Privileges
- Reports to: Dewan Negara
- Appointer: Elected by members of the Dewan Negara
- Term length: Elected upon a vacancy
- Constituting instrument: Federal Constitution of Malaysia
- Inaugural holder: Abdul Rahman Mohamed Yassin
- Formation: 11 September 1959; 66 years ago
- Deputy: Deputy President of the Dewan Negara
- Salary: MYR 362,000 annually
- Website: Parliament of Malaysia

The president of the Senate (Malay: Yang di-Pertua Dewan Negara; Jawi: يڠ دڤرتوا ديوان نڬارا) is the presiding officer or speaker of the Dewan Negara, the upper house of the Parliament of Malaysia.

The president of the Senate is created under Article 56 of the Constitution of Malaysia. The office is similar to the speaker of the Dewan Rakyat: the president is elected by the members of the Senate and is expected to be politically impartial. If a member of the Dewan Negara is elected as the president and is a member of a state legislative assembly, he must resign from the assembly before exercising the functions of the office. As the president may hold different titles while in office, it also changes the style. The position has been held by Awang Bemee Awang Ali Basah of the Gabungan Parti Sarawak (GPS) since July 2024.

== Functions ==
The main functions of the president of the Dewan Negara are:

- to preside over the sittings of the Dewan Negara
- to be responsible for the observance of the rules in the Dewan Negara
- to ensure the relevancy of the points raised during the debate
- to interpret the Standing Orders in case of disputes and the decision is final

== List of presidents of the Dewan Negara ==
As of 7 September 2026, almost all presidents of the Dewan Negara won unopposed in the presidential election except for Rais Yatim.

No.	Portrait	Name (Birth–Death)	Term of office			Party	Parliament
No.	Portrait	Name (Birth–Death)	Took office	Left office	Time in office	Party	Parliament
1		Dato' Haji; Abdul Rahman Mohamed Yassin (1890–1970); Senator from Johore	11 September 1959	31 December 1968	9 years, 112 days	Alliance (UMNO)	1st
1		Dato' Haji; Abdul Rahman Mohamed Yassin (1890–1970); Senator from Johore	11 September 1959	31 December 1968	9 years, 112 days	Alliance (UMNO)	2nd
2		Syed Sheh Barakbah (1906–1975); Appointed Senator	27 January 1969	5 February 1969	10 days	Alliance (UMNO)	–
3		Tan Sri Dato' Haji; Mohamed Noah Omar (1897–1991); Appointed Senator	24 February 1969	28 July 1970	1 year, 155 days	Alliance (UMNO)	–
3		Tan Sri Dato' Haji; Mohamed Noah Omar (1897–1991); Appointed Senator	24 February 1969	28 July 1970	1 year, 155 days	Alliance (UMNO)	3rd
4		Tan Sri Haji; Abdul Hamid Khan; Appointed Senator (1900–1974)	20 February 1971	22 February 1973	2 years, 3 days	Alliance (UMNO)	–
5		Tun Tan Sri Haji; Ong Yoke Lin; Appointed Senator (1917–2010)	23 February 1973	30 December 1980	7 years, 311 days	Alliance (MCA)	–
5		Tun Tan Sri Haji; Ong Yoke Lin; Appointed Senator (1917–2010)	23 February 1973	30 December 1980	7 years, 311 days	BN (MCA)	4th
5		Tun Tan Sri Haji; Ong Yoke Lin; Appointed Senator (1917–2010)	23 February 1973	30 December 1980	7 years, 311 days	BN (MCA)	5th
6		Tan Sri; Ismail Khan Ibrahim Khan (1905–2000); Appointed Senator	31 December 1980	13 April 1985	4 years, 103 days	BN (UMNO)	–
6		Tan Sri; Ismail Khan Ibrahim Khan (1905–2000); Appointed Senator	31 December 1980	13 April 1985	4 years, 103 days	BN (UMNO)	6th
7		Tan Sri Datuk; Benedict Stephens (1926–2003); Appointed Senator	15 April 1985	11 April 1988	2 years, 362 days	Independent	–
7		Tan Sri Datuk; Benedict Stephens (1926–2003); Appointed Senator	15 April 1985	11 April 1988	2 years, 362 days	Independent	7th
8		Tan Sri Datuk; Abang Ahmad Urai (1933–2022); Senator from Sarawak	11 July 1988	9 July 1990	1 year, 363 days	BN (PBB)	–
9		Tan Sri Dato'; Chan Choong Tak (1933–2018); Appointed Senator	17 December 1990	31 March 1992	1 year, 105 days	BN (MCA)	8th
10		Tan Sri Dato'; Vadiveloo Govindasamy (1932–2024); Appointed Senator	13 April 1992	12 June 1995	3 years, 60 days	BN (MIC)	–
10		Tan Sri Dato'; Vadiveloo Govindasamy (1932–2024); Appointed Senator	13 April 1992	12 June 1995	3 years, 60 days	BN (MIC)	9th
11		Tan Sri Dato' Sri; Adam Kadir (1942–2025); Appointed Senator	13 June 1995	30 November 1997	2 years, 170 days	BN (UMNO)	–
12		Tan Sri Dato' Haji; Mohamed Yaacob (1926–2009); Appointed Senator	10 December 1997	5 December 2000	2 years, 361 days	BN (UMNO)	–
12		Tan Sri Dato' Haji; Mohamed Yaacob (1926–2009); Appointed Senator	10 December 1997	5 December 2000	2 years, 361 days	BN (UMNO)	10th
13		Tun Tan Sri; Michael Chen Wing Sum (1932–2024); Appointed Senator	7 December 2000	11 April 2003	2 years, 125 days	BN (MCA)	–
14		Tan Sri Dato' Seri Dr. Abdul Hamid Pawanteh (1944–2022); Appointed Senator	7 July 2003	6 July 2009	5 years, 364 days	BN (UMNO)	–
14		Tan Sri Dato' Seri Dr. Abdul Hamid Pawanteh (1944–2022); Appointed Senator	7 July 2003	6 July 2009	5 years, 364 days	BN (UMNO)	11th
14		Tan Sri Dato' Seri Dr. Abdul Hamid Pawanteh (1944–2022); Appointed Senator	7 July 2003	6 July 2009	5 years, 364 days	BN (UMNO)	12th
15		Tan Sri Ir. Wong Foon Meng (born 1954); Appointed Senator	7 July 2009	12 April 2010	279 days	BN (MCA)	–
16		Tan Sri; Abu Zahar Ujang (born 1944); Appointed Senator	26 April 2010	25 April 2016	5 years, 365 days	BN (UMNO)	–
16		Tan Sri; Abu Zahar Ujang (born 1944); Appointed Senator	26 April 2010	25 April 2016	5 years, 365 days	BN (UMNO)	13th
17		Tan Sri Dato' Sri; Vigneswaran Sanasee (born 1965); Appointed Senator	26 April 2016	22 June 2020	4 years, 57 days	BN (MIC)	–
17		Tan Sri Dato' Sri; Vigneswaran Sanasee (born 1965); Appointed Senator	26 April 2016	22 June 2020	4 years, 57 days	BN (MIC)	14th
18		Tan Sri Dato' Seri Utama Dr. Rais Yatim (born 1942); Appointed Senator	2 September 2020	15 June 2023	2 years, 276 days	PN (BERSATU)	–
18		Tan Sri Dato' Seri Utama Dr. Rais Yatim (born 1942); Appointed Senator	2 September 2020	15 June 2023	2 years, 276 days	PN (BERSATU)	15th
19		Tan Sri Dato Sri Dr. Haji; Wan Junaidi Tuanku Jaafar (born 1946); Appointed Senator	19 June 2023	18 January 2024	213 days	GPS (PBB)	–
20		Datuk; Mutang Tagal (1954–2024); Appointed Senator	19 February 2024	10 May 2024	81 days	GPS (PBB)	–
21		Dato; Awang Bemee Awang Ali Basah (born 1959); Appointed Senator	22 July 2024	Incumbent	2 years, 47 days	GPS (PBB)	–

=== Election results ===
Election date	Candidate(s)	Votes	Nominated by	Seconded by	Secretary
11 September 1959	Abdul Rahman Mohamed Yasin	Unopposed	Leong Yew Koh	Tan Tong Hye	Ramli Abdul Hamid
15 October 1962	Sheikh Abu Bakar Yahya, pro tempore	Unopposed	Leong Yew Koh	Tan Tong Hye	Ahmad Abdullah
18 October 1965	Abdul Rahman Mohamed Yasin	Unopposed	Tan Tong Hye	Amaluddin Darus	Ahmad Abdullah
27 January 1969	Syed Sheh Syed Hassan Barakbah	Unopposed	Abdul Ghafar Baba	J. E. S. Crawford	Ahmad Abdullah
24 February 1969	Mohamad Noah Omar	Unopposed	Abdul Ghafar Baba	Pandak Hamid Puteh Jali	Ahmad Abdullah
20 February 1971	Abdul Hamid Khan Sakhawat Ali Khan	Unopposed	Abdul Kadir Yusuf	Tan Tong Hye	Lim Joo Keng
23 February 1973	Omar Yoke Lin Ong	Unopposed	Abdul Kadir Yusuf	Kamarul Ariffin Mohd Yassin	Lim Joo Keng
6 January 1975	Omar Yoke Lin Ong	Unopposed	Athi Nahappan	Pandak Hamid Puteh Jali	Lim Joo Keng
31 December 1980	Ismail Khan	Unopposed	Mohamed Nasir	Michael Wong Kuan Lee	Ahmad Hasmuni Hussein
15 December 1983	Ismail Khan	Unopposed	James Peter Ongkili	Ariffin Salleh	Ahmad Hasmuni Hussein
15 April 1985	Benedict Stephens	Unopposed	Mohamed Yusof Mohamed Noor	Tan Chang Soong	Ahmad Hasmuni Hussein
11 July 1988	Abang Ahmad Urai Abang Mohideen	Unopposed	Kasitah Gaddam	Hussein Ahmad	Abdul Rahim Abu Bakar
17 December 1990	Chan Choong Tak	Unopposed	Abdul Ghafar Baba	Annuar Musa	Mohamed Salleh Abu Bakar
13 April 1992	Vadiveloo Govindasamy	Unopposed	Mahathir Mohamad	Ling Liong Sik	Mohamed Salleh Abu Bakar
14 December 1994	Vadiveloo Govindasamy	Unopposed	Anwar Ibrahim	Ling Liong Sik	Mohamed Salleh Abu Bakar
13 June 1995	Adam Kadir	Unopposed	Anwar Ibrahim	Samy Vellu	Mohamed Salleh Abu Bakar
10 December 1997	Mohamed Yaacob	Unopposed	Anwar Ibrahim	Chong Kah Kiat	Abdullah Abdul Wahab
27 December 1999	Mohamed Yaacob	Unopposed	Abdullah Ahmad Badawi	Abdul Hamid Othman	Abdullah Abdul Wahab
7 December 2000	Michael Chen Wing Sum	Unopposed	Ling Liong Sik	Samy Vellu	Abdullah Abdul Wahab
7 July 2003	Abdul Hamid Pawanteh	Unopposed	Tengku Adnan Tengku Mansor	M. Kayveas	Abdullah Abdul Wahab
19 July 2006	Abdul Hamid Pawanteh	Unopposed	M. Kayveas	Abdul Raman Suliman	Zamani Sulaiman
7 July 2009	Wong Foon Meng	Unopposed	Mohamed Nazri Abdul Aziz	Ong Tee Keat	Zamani Sulaiman
26 April 2010	Abu Zahar Ujang	Unopposed	Koh Tsu Koon	Shahrizat Abdul Jalil	Zamani Sulaiman
26 April 2016	Vigneswaran Sanasee	Unopposed	Azalina Othman Said	J Loga Bala Mohan	Riduan Rahmat
2 September 2020	Rais Yatim	45	Takiyuddin Hassan	Shabudin Yahaya	Muhammad Sujairi Abdullah
2 September 2020	Yusmadi Yusoff	19	Ahmad Azam Hamzah	Mohamad Imran Abdul Hamid	Muhammad Sujairi Abdullah
19 June 2023	Wan Junaidi Tuanku Jaafar	Unopposed	Anwar Ibrahim	Tengku Zafrul Aziz	Muhammad Sujairi Abdullah
19 February 2024	Mutang Tagal	Unopposed	Anwar Ibrahim	Azalina Othman Said	Muhammad Sujairi Abdullah
22 July 2024	Awang Bemee Awang Ali Basah	Unopposed	Anwar Ibrahim	Azalina Othman Said	Muhammad Sujairi Abdullah

== See also ==
- Dewan Negara
- Parliament of Malaysia
- Speaker of the Dewan Rakyat
