= Members of the Dewan Negara, 10th Malaysian Parliament =

10th Parliament of Malaysia
←	9th Parliament	11th Parliament	→

Overview
- Legislative body: Parliament of Malaysia
- Jurisdiction: Malaysia
- Meeting place: Malaysian Houses of Parliament
- Term: 20 December 1999 – 4 March 2004
- Election: Indirect election and appointments
- Website: www.parlimen.gov.my

Dewan Negara
- Members: 69 (until 1 February 2001); 70
- President: Mohamed Yaacob (until 5 December 2000); Michael Chen Wing Sum (until 11 April 2003); Abdul Hamid Pawanteh
- Deputy President: Michael Chen Wing Sum (until 5 December 2000); Gapar Gurrohu
- Secretary: Abdullah Abdul Wahab
- Party control: Barisan Nasional

Sovereign
- Yang di-Pertuan Agong: Tuanku Salahuddin Abdul Aziz Shah (until 21 November 2001); Tuanku Syed Sirajuddin

Sessions
- 1st: 27 December 1999 – 28 December 1999
- 2nd: 14 February 2000 – 21 December 2000
- 3rd: 19 March 2001 – 13 December 2001
- 4th: 11 March 2002 – 28 November 2002
- 5th: 10 March 2003 – 20 November 2003

This is a list of the members of the Dewan Negara (Senate) of the Tenth Parliament of Malaysia.

== Elected by the State Legislative Assembly ==
Senator	Party	State	Term start	Term end
Abdillah Abdul Rahim	BN (PBB)	Sarawak	11 December 1996	10 December 1999
Abdillah Abdul Rahim	BN (PBB)	Sarawak	27 December 1999	26 December 2002
Abdul Malek Abdul Ghani	BN (UMNO)	Perlis	3 May 1999	2 May 2002
Ahmad Ismail	BN (UMNO)	Penang	16 December 1996	15 December 1999
Arzmi Abdul Hamid	BN (UMNO)	Kedah		
Bakri Ali Mahamad	BN (UMNO)	Kedah	13 December 1995	12 December 1998
Bakri Ali Mahamad	BN (UMNO)	Kedah	7 December 1998	6 December 2001
Benedict Bujang Tembak	BN (PBB)	Sarawak	27 December 1999	26 December 2002
Benedict Bujang Tembak	BN (PBB)	Sarawak	18 November 2002	17 November 2005
Chin Fook Weng	BN (Gerakan)	Penang		
Christina Lorline Tibok @ Christine Vanhouten	BN (UPKO)	Sabah		
Christina Lorline Tibok @ Christine Vanhouten	BN (UPKO)	Sabah	31 July 2000	30 July 2003
Ghazi @ Hasbullah Ramli	BN (UMNO)	Selangor	11 August 1997	10 August 2000
Ghazi @ Hasbullah Ramli	BN (UMNO)	Selangor	8 September 2000	7 September 2003
Halimah Hamzah	BN (UMNO)	Pahang		
Hamzah Zainudin	BN (UMNO)	Perak	8 September 2000	7 September 2003
Hamzah Zainudin	BN (UMNO)	Perak	17 September 2003	16 September 2006
Haris Salleh	BN (UMNO)	Johor		
Hassan Shukri	PAS	Terengganu	27 December 1999	26 December 2002
Hazizah Mohd. Sultan	BN (UMNO)	Malacca	27 December 1999	26 December 2002
Ho Lim Teck	BN (MCA)	Malacca	12 October 1999	11 October 2002
Hunaizah Mohd. Noor	PAS	Kelantan	4 August 1997	3 August 2000
Jamilah Ibrahim	PAS	Kelantan	4 August 1997	3 August 2000
Jamilah Ibrahim	PAS	Kelantan	18 July 2000	17 July 2003
Kalakau Untol	BN (UPKO)	Sabah	3 November 2003	2 November 2006
Karim Ghani	BN (UMNO)	Sabah	27 December 1999	26 December 2002
Karim Salleh	BN (UMNO)	Perlis		
Kee Ah Kau	BN (MCA)	Selangor	8 September 2000	7 September 2003
Lee Pit Chern	BN (MCA)	Negeri Sembilan	19 May 1999	18 May 2002
Lim Kee Moi	BN (MCA)	Johor		
Lim Sing @ Lam Kam Sang	BN (MCA)	Pahang	28 April 2003	27 April 2006
Mariah Abdullah	BN (UMNO)	Perlis		
Mazlan Abu	BN (UMNO)	Johor	2 August 1999	1 August 2002
Melati Ali	BN (UMNO)	Pahang		
Mohamad Taha Ariffin	BN (PBB)	Sarawak	18 November 2002	17 November 2005
Mustaffa Kamal Mohd. Nawi	BN (UMNO)	Perak	9 November 1995	8 November 1998
Mustaffa Kamal Mohd. Nawi	BN (UMNO)	Perak	4 August 1997	3 August 2000
Omar Faudzar	BN (UMNO)	Penang		
Parasuraman Sanasamy	BN (MIC)	Kedah	6 October 1997	5 October 2000
Poh Mok Hua @ Poh Bak Hoe	BN (MCA)	Malacca		
Poo Yew Choy	BN (MCA)	Johor	2 May 2000	18 March 2003
Safinah Jusoh	PAS	Terengganu	27 December 1999	26 December 2002
See Too Mee	BN (MCA)	Johor	24 April 2000	23 April 2003
Siti Zailah Mohd Yusoff	PAS	Kelantan	18 July 2000	17 July 2003
Siti Zailah Mohd Yusoff	PAS	Kelantan	1 July 2003	30 June 2006
Tan Ah Eng	BN (MCA)	Johor	12 May 1997	11 May 2000
Tan Cheng Tee	BN (MCA)	Negeri Sembilan	11 November 2002	10 November 2005
Tan Ek Huat	BN (MCA)	Perak	6 October 1997	5 October 2000
Tee Thiong Hock	BN (MCA)	Selangor	11 August 1997	10 August 2000
Wan Nordin Che Murat	BN (UMNO)	Perlis		
Wan Ubaidah Omar	PAS	Kelantan	1 July 2003	30 June 2006
Yaakob Mohammad	BN (UMNO)	Kedah		
Yew Thuan Chiew	BN (MCA)	Perak	13 December 2000	12 December 2003
Zakaria Arshad	BN (UMNO)	Negeri Sembilan	11 August 1997	10 August 2000
Zakaria Arshad	BN (UMNO)	Negeri Sembilan	6 December 2000	5 December 2003

== Nominated by the Prime Minister and appointed by the Yang di-Pertuan Agong ==
Senator	Party		Term start	Term end
Abdul Aziz Abdul Rahman	BN (UMNO)	Appointed	4 September 1995	3 September 1998
Abdul Aziz Shamsuddin	BN (UMNO)	Appointed	3 November 1999	2 November 2002
Abdul Hamid Othman	BN (UMNO)	Appointed	13 December 1999	12 December 2002
Abdul Hamid Pawanteh (President)	BN (UMNO)	Appointed		
Abdul Hamid Zainal Abidin	BN (UMNO)	Appointed		
Abdul Rahman Palit	BN (UMNO)	Appointed		
Abdul Wahid Vartan Syed Ghany	BN (UMNO)	Appointed	5 February 1998	4 February 2001
Abdullah Ayub	BN (UMNO)	Appointed		
Agnes Shim Tshin Nyuk	BN (MCA)	Appointed		
Appala Naidu Rajoo	BN (MIC)	Appointed	22 May 2001	21 May 2004
Azizah Mohd Dun	BN (UMNO)	Appointed	4 July 2000	3 July 2003
Azizah Mohd Dun	BN (UMNO)	Appointed	12 August 2003	11 August 2006
Charern Intachat	BN (UMNO)	Appointed	14 May 1996	13 May 1999
Charern Intachat	BN (UMNO)	Appointed	19 May 1999	18 May 2002
Charlie Chau-Lap Chang	BN (MCA)	Appointed	27 July 1999	26 July 2002
Che Jam Haron	BN (UMNO)	Appointed	27 July 1999	26 July 2002
Chew Poh Thoi	BN (MCA)	Appointed		
Dayang Mahani Pengiran Ahmad Raffae	BN (UMNO)	Appointed		
Faridah Abu Hassan	BN (UMNO)	Appointed	4 September 1995	3 September 1998
Gapar Gurrohu (Deputy President)	BN (UMNO)	Appointed	6 October 1997	5 October 2000
Gapar Gurrohu (Deputy President)	BN (UMNO)	Appointed	2 November 2000	1 November 2003
Ismail Kassim	BN (UMNO)	Appointed		
Jang Chow Thye @ Yio Chow Thye	BN (Gerakan)	Appointed	14 May 1996	13 May 1999
Jang Chow Thye @ Yio Chow Thye	BN (Gerakan)	Appointed	19 May 1999	18 May 2002
Jaya Partiban	BN (MIC)	Appointed		
Joseph Balan Seling	BN (PBB)	Appointed		
K. R. A. Naidu	BN (MIC)	Appointed		
Kasim Md. Yusop	BN (UMNO)	Appointed		
Kasitah Gaddam	BN (UMNO)	Appointed		
Khoo Lay Hin	BN (MCA)	Appointed	14 May 1996	13 May 1999
Khoo Lay Hin	BN (MCA)	Appointed	18 May 1998	17 May 2001
Lau Yin Pin @ Lau Yen Beng	BN (MCA)	Appointed		
Lee Sing Chooi	BN (MCA)	Appointed	2 October 2003	1 October 2006
Lim Eng Kok	BN (MCA)	Appointed		
Long Jidin	IND	Appointed	26 May 1997	25 May 2000
Long Jidin	IND	Appointed	25 June 2000	24 June 2000
M. Kayveas	BN (PPP)	Appointed	6 December 2000	5 December 2003
M. Krishnan	BN (MIC)	Appointed		
Mansor Md. Jaafar	BN (UMNO)	Appointed	26 November 2001	25 November 2004
Marimuthu Nadeson	BN (MIC)	Appointed		
Marimuthu Nadeson	BN (MIC)	Appointed	9 March 1998	8 March 2001
Melanie Chua Chui Ket	BN (SAPP)	Appointed	2 August 1999	1 August 2002
Michael Chen Wing Sum (Deputy President) (President)	BN (Gerakan)	Appointed	7 April 1997	6 April 2000
Michael Chen Wing Sum (Deputy President) (President)	BN (Gerakan)	Appointed	24 April 2000	23 April 2003
Mohamed Omar Beledram	BN (UMNO)	Appointed	26 November 2001	25 November 2004
Mohamed Yaacob (President)	BN (UMNO)	Appointed	10 December 1996	9 December 1999
Muhammad Abdul Ghani	BN (UMNO)	Appointed	15 July 1997	4 April 2003
Musa Mohamad	BN (UMNO)	Appointed	13 December 1999	12 December 2002
Naomi Chong Set Mui	BN (LDP)	Appointed	2 October 2003	1 October 2006
Nik Azizah Nik Yahya	BN (UMNO)	Appointed		
Nor Azah Awin	BN (UMNO)	Appointed	27 July 1999	26 July 2002
Norjan Khan Bahadar	BN (UMNO)	Appointed	4 December 1997	3 December 2000
Norsimah Hashim	BN (UMNO)	Appointed	27 July 1999	26 July 2002
Ooi Siew Kim	BN (MCA)	Appointed		
Osman Bungsu	IND	Appointed	2 October 2003	1 October 2006
Pandikar Amin Mulia	BN (AKAR)	Appointed	7 March 1988	6 March 1991
Pandikar Amin Mulia	BN (AKAR)	Appointed	24 May 1999	23 May 2002
Puizah Abu Kassim	BN (UMNO)	Appointed	2 August 1999	1 August 2002
Ratnam Muthiah	BN (MIC)	Appointed	4 July 2000	3 July 2003
Ratnam Muthiah	BN (MIC)	Appointed	12 August 2003	11 August 2006
Rosli Mat Hassan	BN (UMNO)	Appointed	26 May 1997	25 May 2000
Rosli Mat Hassan	BN (UMNO)	Appointed	25 June 2000	24 June 2000
Samsiah Samsudin	BN (UMNO)	Appointed		
Saravanan Murugan	BN (MIC)	Appointed	6 December 2000	5 December 2003
Sinniah Raju	BN (MIC)	Appointed	10 April 2001	9 April 2004
Siti Hawa @ Karimah Mohd. Nor	BN (UMNO)	Appointed	12 August 1998	11 August 2001
Siw Chun Eam	BN (UMNO)	Appointed		
Syed Ali Syed Abbas Alhabshee	BN (UMNO)	Appointed		
T. Marimuthu	BN (MIC)	Appointed	14 May 1996	13 May 1999
T. Marimuthu	BN (MIC)	Appointed	19 May 1999	18 May 2002
Tengku Adnan Tengku Mansor	BN (UMNO)	Appointed	13 December 2000	12 December 2003
Ting Chek Sii	BN (MCA)	Appointed		
Ting Chek Sii	BN (MCA)	Appointed	12 May 1998	11 May 2001
Udam @ George Adam Talek	BN (PBB)	Appointed		
V. K. K. Teagarajan	BN (MIC)	Appointed	14 December 1994	13 December 1997
V. K. K. Teagarajan	BN (MIC)	Appointed	6 October 1997	5 October 2000
Vijayaratnam Seevaratnam	BN (Gerakan)	Appointed		
Wan Asiah Ahmad	BN (UMNO)	Appointed	11 November 1997	10 November 2000
Wan Asiah Ahmad	BN (UMNO)	Appointed	2 November 2000	1 November 2003
Wee Kok Tiong	BN (MCA)	Appointed	6 August 2001	5 August 2004
William Lau Kung Hui	BN (SNAP)	Appointed		
Yew Teong Look	BN (MCA)	Appointed		
Zainal Rampak	BN (UMNO)	Appointed	7 December 1998	6 December 2001
Zainal Rampak	BN (UMNO)	Appointed	12 December 2001	11 December 2004
Zainuddin Maidin	BN (UMNO)	Appointed	9 March 1998	8 March 2001

== Death in office ==
- Poo Yew Choy (d. 18 March 2003)
