= Kinabalu =

Kinabalu may refer to:

- Kota Kinabalu, the capital of the Malaysian state of Sabah
- Kinabalu (federal constituency), an electoral constituency in Sabah, Malaysia, 1966–2004
- Mount Kinabalu, the highest peak in Malaysia
- Kinabalu National Park, the state park that is home to Mount Kinabalu
