= Sepaktakraw Association of Malaysia =

Sport governing body

- Sport: Sepaktakraw
- Abbreviation: PSM
- Founded: 1960
- Affiliation: International Sepaktakraw Federation (ISTAF)
- Location: Setapak, Kuala Lumpur
- President: Sumali Reduan
- Secretary: Haji Abidullah Hj. Salleh

Official website
- www.persatuansepaktakrawmalaysia.com/home/index.html
- (Malaysia)

The Sepaktakraw Association of Malaysia (Malay: Persatuan Sepaktakraw Malaysia, abbreviated PSM), is the national governing body for sepaktakraw in Malaysia, officially founded on 28 January 1960 in Penang, responsible for organising the national Sepak Takraw League, which was held annually since its establishment in 2014, as well as supporting and co-ordinating its state affiliations.

In 2008, the Sepaktakraw Association of Malaysia was temporarily suspended the federation membership status by the International Sepaktakraw Federation (ISTAF), after Ahmad Ismail, the former PSM president, tried to influence some member countries to withdraw from the federation, as a result, the national team cannot to compete in any ISTAF-related events. Meanwhile, Ahmad Ismail was suspended the right to engage in any federation-related enterprise until 2038 for the aforementioned disciplinary offenses. Furthermore, at least five state affiliations consequently withdrew from the national association due to the mentioned problem, such as the Selangor Sepaktakraw Association (PSS), Kelantan Sepak Takraw Federation (GASTAK) as well as the Johor State Sepak Takraw Association (PSTJ), The establishment of a new national governing body by the former state affiliations replacing the PSM was expected.

== History ==
The increase of sepaktakraw popularity in Penang during the 1940s caused the formation of the ‘Penang Raga Football Sponsor Committee’ on 25 March 1956 at UMNO Hall. Later on 28 January 1960, the committee invited many state representatives to the conference at Building No. 160 on Perak road, Penang, to form a National Sepak Takraw Association, with Mohd Khir Johari served as the first president and Mohd Yussof Latiff as the secretary of the association at that time.

== Board of directors ==
The following list is featured the current board of directors of the Sepaktakraw Association of Malaysia.

Position	Name
President	Dato Sumali Reduan
Deputy President	Dato Abdul Halim Suleiman; Dato Seri Abdul Puhat Mat Nayan
Vice-president	Tengku Zaihan Che Ku Abd Rahman; Awang Sham Haji Amit; Dato Abu Jimi Samat
Secretary	Datuk Haji Abidullah Hj. Salleh
Treasurer	Datuk Dazma Shah

=== Former board of directors ===
Former President

- Mohammed Khir Johari (1960 – 1981)
- Ahmad Razali Mohd Ali (1981 – 1985)
- Mohammed Khir Johari (1985 – 1993)
- Saidin Thamby (Asnirrul Saiddin Thamby Cheik) (1993 – 2002)
- Ahmad Ismail (2002 – 2022)

Former General secretary

- Mohd Yussof Latiff (1960 – 1978)
- Dermi Habib (1978 – 1981)
- Ahmad Tajuddin Shahabudin (1981 – 1985)
- Abdullah Marzuki (1985 – 1991, 1992 – 1993)
- Shuaib Kassa (1991 – 1992)
- Mohd Azmi Shaari (1993 – 1995)
- Syed Abdan (1995 – 2002)
