= Rizuan Abdul Hamid =

Malaysian politician (died 2021)

Yang Berbahagia Datuk Seri Haji Rizuan Abdul Hamid SMW
- رضوان عبدالحميد

Senator
- In office 14 October 2005 – 27 October 2011
- Monarchs: Sirajuddin; Mizan Zainal Abidin
- Prime Minister: Abdullah Ahmad Badawi; Najib Razak

Chairman of Halal Development Corporation (HDC)
- In office 2017–2019
- Prime Minister: Najib Razak; Mahathir Mohamad
- Preceded by: Syed Jalaludin Syed Salim
- Succeeded by: Mahmud Abbas

Personal details
- Born: Federation of Malaya (now Malaysia)
- Died: 20 May 2021 Kuala Lumpur, Malaysia
- Resting place: Raudhatul Sakinah Cemetery, Kepong, Kuala Lumpur
- Spouse: Madinah Mohamad
- Occupation: Politician

Rizuan Abdul Hamid (died 20 May 2021) was a Malaysian politician. He was a two-term Senator for the upper house of 11th (14 October 2005 – 13 October 2008) and 12th Malaysian Parliament (28 October 2008 – 27 October 2011). He was also the former chairman of Halal Development Corporation (HDC).

A member of the United Malays National Organisation (UMNO), a component of Barisan Nasional (BN) coalition, Rizuan was the party Deputy Permanent Chairman (2018–2021) and Kepong Division Chief for more than 30 years who was one of the longest-serving division heads in Malaysia.

== Controversies and issues ==
Rizuan was widely known as a staunch supporter of Datuk Seri Najib Razak after he openly declared his allegiance and willingness to 'die' for the controversial 1MDB scandal-tainted prime minister and UMNO leader in 2015. Rizuan's halted development project of 10 units banglo houses in Bukit Tunku only proceeded after intervention by Najib as the prime minister and minister of finance for a bank to set aside his bankruptcy procedure earlier.

== Personal life ==
Rizuan was married to Tan Sri Dr Madinah Mohamad, the former Auditor general of Malaysia (2017-2019) appointed by Najib's administration during the investigation of 1Malaysia Development Berhad (1MDB). Opposition spokesman Fahmi Fadzil, has questioned her appointment for her integrity, impartiality and accountability due to her husband's close political connection with Najib. During her early tenure when government was still under the BN, she together with Public Accounts Committee (PAC) then were accused to be the instruments of Najib in refusing to continue the 1MDB probe. Somehow after the fall of BN and change to new Pakatan Harapan (PH) government in 2018, she had disclosed that the 2016 final audit report on 1MDB was rigged and tampered with on the orders of Najib's office, in a press statement she gave earlier and again during the new PAC proceedings. Her contract as the Auditor General expired in 2019 and was not renewed.

== Death ==
On 20 May 2021, Rizuan died at 10.53 pm due to COVID-19 pandemic at the University Malaya Medical Centre (UMMC). He was earlier on 1 May confirmed to be COVID-19 infected in a screening test and was later in critical condition after receiving treatment at the UMMC's intensive care unit (ICU) since 3 May. He was buried at the Raudhatul Sakinah Cemetery in Kepong. He leaves behind his wife who was still being treated for COVID-19 in critical condition too at the same hospital ICU. Condolences were sent by many to Rizuan's family including Najib Razak as well.

== Honours ==
=== Honours of Malaysia ===
- Federal Territory (Malaysia)
  - Grand Commander of the Order of the Territorial Crown (SMW) – Datuk Seri (2016)

=== Award ===
- Global Halal Development Leadership Award of the Malaysia International Business Award 2017 by the Selangor Malay Chamber of Commerce (Dewan Perniagaan Melayu Selangor).

== See also ==
- List of deaths due to COVID-19 - notable individual deaths
