= Members of the Dewan Negara, 8th Malaysian Parliament =

8th Parliament of Malaysia
←	7th Parliament	9th Parliament	→

Overview
- Legislative body: Parliament of Malaysia
- Jurisdiction: Malaysia
- Meeting place: Malaysian Houses of Parliament
- Term: 3 December 1990 – 6 April 1995
- Election: Indirect election and appointments
- Website: www.parlimen.gov.my

Dewan Negara
- Members: 69
- President: Chan Choong Tak (until 31 March 1992); Vadiveloo Govindasamy
- Deputy President: Chan Choong Tak (until 16 December 1990); Adam Kadir
- Secretary: Mohamad Salleh Abu Bakar
- Party control: Barisan Nasional

Sovereign
- Yang di-Pertuan Agong: Tuanku Azlan Shah (until 25 April 1994); Tuanku Jaafar

Sessions
- 1st: 4 December 1990 – 13 April 1992
- 2nd: 27 April 1992 – 31 December 1992
- 3rd: 26 April 1993 – 30 December 1993
- 4th: 11 April 1994 – 29 December 1994

This is a list of the members of the Dewan Negara (Senate) of the Eighth Parliament of Malaysia.

== Elected by the State Legislative Assembly ==
Senator	Party	State	Term start	Term end
Abdul Majid Abdullah	BN (UMNO)	Johor	11 December 1986	10 December 1989
Abdul Majid Abdullah	BN (UMNO)	Johor	26 December 1989	25 December 1992
Abdul Rashid Ismail	BN (UMNO)	Penang	19 March 1990	18 March 1993
Asmah Ismail	BN (UMNO)	Pahang	25 June 1990	24 June 1993
Azumu Tak	BN (UMNO)	Perak	30 November 1987	29 November 1990
Balaram Pethanaidu	BN (MIC)	Kedah	11 July 1988	10 July 1991
Chong Chi Siong	BN (MCA)	Negeri Sembilan	25 August 1989	24 August 1992
Dahalan Embun	BN (UMNO)	Perlis	23 March 1987	22 March 1990
Dol Dollah	BN (UMNO)	Malacca	19 December 1989	18 December 1992
Douglas Sullang Ganda	BN (PBB)	Sarawak	30 November 1987	29 November 1990
Foo Boon Liang	BN (MCA)	Pahang	13 July 1987	12 July 1990
Foo Boon Liang	BN (MCA)	Pahang	25 June 1990	24 June 1993
Frankie Chong Yu Chee	BN (SAPP)	Sabah	17 December 1990	16 December 1993
Frankie Chong Yu Chee	BN (SAPP)	Sabah	9 May 1994	8 May 1997
Habidah Jusoh	BN (UMNO)	Terengganu	23 February 1987	22 February 1990
Habidah Jusoh	BN (UMNO)	Terengganu	26 December 1989	25 December 1992
Hanipah Ahmad	BN (UMNO)	Perlis	19 April 1993	18 April 1996
Hassan Harun	BN (UMNO)	Kelantan	28 March 1988	27 March 1991
Ho Cheng Wang	BN (MCA)	Perak	24 July 1991	23 July 1994
Ibrahim Daud	BN (UMNO)	Johor	19 April 1993	18 April 1996
Ida Dumpangal née Ida Undan		Sabah	29 December 1989	28 December 1992
Jamaluddin Ahmad	BN (UMNO)	Negeri Sembilan	18 February 1991	17 February 1994
Jamaluddin Ahmad	BN (UMNO)	Negeri Sembilan	9 May 1994	8 May 1997
Janggu Banyang	BN (PBB)	Sarawak	13 December 1993	12 December 1996
Kalthom Othman	BN (UMNO)	Kelantan	24 July 1991	23 July 1994
Kalthom Othman	BN (UMNO)	Kelantan	9 May 1994	8 May 1997
Kelsom Yaacub	BN (UMNO)	Pahang	13 December 1993	12 December 1996
Kian Sit Har	BN (MCA)	Malacca	19 April 1993	18 April 1996
Kuan Peng Soon @ Kuan Peng Ching	BN (MCA)	Perak	3 December 1984	2 December 1987
Kuan Peng Soon @ Kuan Peng Ching	BN (MCA)	Perak	11 July 1988	10 July 1991
Lim Chien Aun	BN (Gerakan)	Penang	19 March 1990	18 March 1993
Limun Laikim		Sabah	19 April 1993	18 April 1996
Low Kai Meng	BN (MCA)	Perak	14 December 1994	13 December 1997
M. Zeevill @ Shanmugam a/I R.M.S. Mutaya	BN (MIC)	Selangor	11 August 1994	10 August 1997
Mohd Noor Abdullah	BN (UMNO)	Kelantan	3 December 1984	2 December 1987
Mohd Noor Abdullah	BN (UMNO)	Kelantan	28 March 1988	27 March 1991
Mohd Radzi Manan	BN (UMNO)	Perak	9 May 1994	8 May 1997
Mohd Zain Mat Daud	BN (UMNO)	Kelantan	24 July 1991	23 July 1994
Mohd Zain Mat Daud	BN (UMNO)	Kelantan	9 May 1994	8 May 1997
Mustafa Awang	BN (UMNO)	Terengganu	15 December 1986	14 December 1989
Mustafa Awang	BN (UMNO)	Terengganu	26 December 1989	25 December 1992
Neo Tuan Cheng	BN (MCA)	Johor	24 July 1991	23 July 1994
Ng Peng Hong @ Ng Peng Hay	BN (MCA)	Malacca	23 March 1987	22 March 1990
Ng Peng Hong @ Ng Peng Hay	BN (MCA)	Malacca	29 May 1990	28 May 1993
Ng See Tiong	BN (MCA)	Johor	9 May 1994	8 May 1997
Ng Yen Yen	BN (MCA)	Pahang	13 December 1993	12 December 1996
Rahmah Salleh	BN (UMNO)	Terengganu		
Rosalind Yau Shuk Meng	BN (MCA)	Selangor	5 August 1991	4 August 1994
Saidin Mohamad	BN (UMNO)	Perlis	19 December 1989	18 December 1992
Salleh @ Hassan Ali	BN (UMNO)	Terengganu	24 May 1993	23 May 1996
Shuib Endut	BN (UMNO)	Kedah	19 December 1989	18 December 1992
Shuib Endut	BN (UMNO)	Kedah	16 December 1992	15 December 1995
Shuib Shawal	BN (UMNO)	Kedah	16 December 1991	15 December 1994
Tan Gim Hua	BN (Gerakan)	Penang	24 July 1991	23 July 1994
Tan Son Lee	BN (MCA)	Kedah	14 December 1994	13 December 1997
Toh Kin Woon	BN (Gerakan)	Penang		
Wan Hamid Edruce Tuanku Mohamad	BN (PBB)	Sarawak	17 December 1990	16 December 1993
Wan Hamid Edruce Tuanku Mohamad	BN (PBB)	Sarawak	13 December 1993	12 December 1996
Zainal Md. Derus	BN (UMNO)	Selangor	5 August 1991	4 August 1994
Zainal Md. Derus	BN (UMNO)	Selangor	11 August 1994	10 August 1997

== Nominated by the Prime Minister and appointed by the Yang di-Pertuan Agong ==
Senator	Party		Term start	Term end
Abdul Salam Awang	BN (UMNO)	Appointed	18 February 1991	17 February 1994
Abdul Salam Awang	BN (UMNO)	Appointed	20 July 1994	19 July 1997
Adam Kadir (Deputy President)	BN (UMNO)	Appointed	17 December 1990	16 December 1993
Adam Kadir (Deputy President)	BN (UMNO)	Appointed	9 December 1993	8 December 1996
Ahmad Abdullah	BN (UMNO)	Appointed	29 March 1991	28 March 1994
Ahmad Abdullah	BN (UMNO)	Appointed	16 December 1991	15 December 1994
Ahmad Zahid Hamidi	BN (UMNO)	Appointed	24 July 1991	23 July 1994
Ainon Ariffin	BN (UMNO)	Appointed	18 February 1986	17 February 1989
Ainon Ariffin	BN (UMNO)	Appointed	27 March 1989	26 March 1992
Annuar Musa	BN (UMNO)	Appointed	17 December 1990	16 December 1993
Annuar Musa	BN (UMNO)	Appointed	27 October 1993	26 October 1996
Azman Atar Othman	BN (UMNO)	Appointed	23 February 1987	22 February 1990
Azman Atar Othman	BN (UMNO)	Appointed	19 March 1990	18 March 1993
C. Krishnan	BN (MIC)	Appointed	15 December 1986	14 December 1989
C. Krishnan	BN (MIC)	Appointed	18 December 1989	17 December 1992
Chan Choong Tak (Deputy President) (President)	BN (MCA)	Appointed	18 February 1986	17 February 1989
Chan Choong Tak (Deputy President) (President)	BN (MCA)	Appointed	3 April 1989	2 April 1992
Che Pora Omar	BN (UMNO)	Appointed	21 February 1991	20 February 1994
Che Pora Omar	BN (UMNO)	Appointed	31 March 1994	30 March 1997
Chong Kah Kiat	BN (LDP)	Appointed	14 December 1994	13 December 1997
David Yeoh Eng Hock	BN (MCA)	Appointed	19 October 1989	18 October 1992
David Yeoh Eng Hock	BN (MCA)	Appointed	27 October 1992	26 October 1995
Ding Seling	BN (PBB)	Appointed	16 December 1991	15 December 1994
Ding Seling	BN (PBB)	Appointed	14 December 1994	13 December 1997
Fu Ah Kiow	BN (MCA)	Appointed		
Ghazali Embong	BN (UMNO)	Appointed	24 July 1991	23 July 1994
Ghazali Embong	BN (UMNO)	Appointed	20 July 1994	19 July 1997
Habshah Osman	BN (UMNO)	Appointed	27 October 1992	26 October 1995
Isli Siput		Appointed		
Isli Siput		Appointed	20 December 1993	19 December 1996
Itam Wali Nawan		Appointed		
Itam Wali Nawan		Appointed	20 December 1993	19 December 1996
Jeffrey Gapari Kitingan		Appointed	11 August 1994	10 August 1997
Johan Ghani	BN (UMNO)	Appointed	24 July 1991	23 July 1994
Johan Ghani	BN (UMNO)	Appointed	14 December 1994	13 December 1997
K. S. Nijhar	BN (MIC)	Appointed	2 August 1985	1 August 1988
K. S. Nijhar	BN (MIC)	Appointed	25 August 1988	24 August 1991
K. Vijayanathan Kesava Pillai	BN (MIC)	Appointed	18 February 1991	17 February 1994
K. Vijayanathan Kesava Pillai	BN (MIC)	Appointed	16 December 1992	15 December 1995
Law Jack Yoon	BN (MCA)	Appointed	14 February 1987	13 February 1990
Law Jack Yoon	BN (MCA)	Appointed	18 December 1989	17 December 1992
Mak Hon Kam	BN (MCA)	Appointed	1 December 1986	30 December 1989
Mak Hon Kam	BN (MCA)	Appointed	18 February 1991	17 February 1994
Mastika Junaidah Husin	BN (UMNO)	Appointed	14 December 1994	13 December 1997
Michael Bong Thiam Joon	BN (SNAP)	Appointed	5 August 1992	4 August 1995
Mohamed Nazri Abdul Aziz	BN (UMNO)	Appointed	30 December 1991	29 December 1994
Mohd Ghazali Mohd Seth	BN (UMNO)	Appointed	19 March 1990	18 March 1993
Mohd. Wajdi Ishak	BN (UMNO)	Appointed	23 February 1987	22 February 1990
Mohd. Wajdi Ishak	BN (UMNO)	Appointed	20 February 1990	19 February 1993
Munisamy Kuppan	BN (MIC)	Appointed	18 February 1991	17 February 1994
Munisamy Kuppan	BN (MIC)	Appointed	16 December 1991	15 December 1994
Mustapa Mohamed	BN (UMNO)	Appointed	29 March 1991	28 March 1994
Mustapa Mohamed	BN (UMNO)	Appointed	31 March 1994	30 March 1997
Ng Thian Hock	BN (MCA)	Appointed	24 July 1991	23 July 1994
Nordin Selat	BN (UMNO)	Appointed	23 February 1987	22 February 1990
Nordin Selat	BN (UMNO)	Appointed	27 March 1989	26 March 1992
Othman Yunos	BN (UMNO)	Appointed	20 July 1994	19 July 1997
Rahaiah Baheran	BN (UMNO)	Appointed	27 October 1992	26 October 1995
Rahim Baba	BN (UMNO)	Appointed	16 December 1991	15 December 1994
Rahim Baba	BN (UMNO)	Appointed	14 December 1994	13 December 1997
Rogayah Che Mat	BN (UMNO)	Appointed	18 February 1986	17 February 1989
Rogayah Che Mat	BN (UMNO)	Appointed	27 March 1989	26 March 1992
Rosnah Mohd. Salleh	BN (UMNO)	Appointed	23 February 1987	22 February 1990
Rosnah Mohd. Salleh	BN (UMNO)	Appointed	20 February 1990	19 February 1993
Saad Man	BN (UMNO)	Appointed	24 July 1991	23 July 1994
Sak Cheng Lum	BN (MCA)	Appointed	18 February 1991	17 February 1994
Sak Cheng Lum	BN (MCA)	Appointed	31 March 1994	30 March 1997
Salbiah Mohd. Akim	BN (UMNO)	Appointed	1 December 1986	30 November 1989
Salbiah Mohd. Akim	BN (UMNO)	Appointed	5 July 1989	4 July 1992
Saravanan Veliaudayar	BN (MIC)	Appointed	31 March 1994	30 March 1997
Sarasa Velu	BN (MIC)	Appointed	16 December 1992	15 December 1995
Selemiah Hashim	BN (UMNO)	Appointed	19 April 1993	18 April 1996
Shahiruddin Ab. Moin	BN (UMNO)	Appointed		
Shuaib Lazim	BN (UMNO)	Appointed	5 April 1985	4 April 1988
Shuaib Lazim	BN (UMNO)	Appointed	11 July 1988	10 July 1991
Soong Siew Hoong	BN (Gerakan)	Appointed		
Syed Abdul Hamid Sagaff	BN (UMNO)	Appointed	16 December 1987	15 December 1990
Syed Abdul Hamid Sagaff	BN (UMNO)	Appointed	29 March 1991	28 March 1994
Tan Tiew Bock	BN (MCA)	Appointed	18 February 1991	17 February 1994
Tiong Hiew King	BN (SUPP)	Appointed	29 July 1985	28 July 1988
Tiong Hiew King	BN (SUPP)	Appointed	28 November 1988	27 November 1991
Tiong Thai King	BN (SUPP)	Appointed	16 December 1991	15 December 1994
V. K. K. Teagarajan	BN (MIC)	Appointed	14 December 1994	13 December 1997
V. K. Sellappan	BN (MIC)	Appointed	11 July 1988	10 July 1991
V. K. Sellappan	BN (MIC)	Appointed	24 July 1991	23 July 1994
Vadiveloo Govindasamy (President)	BN (MIC)	Appointed	16 December 1991	15 December 1994
Vadiveloo Govindasamy (President)	BN (MIC)	Appointed	14 December 1994	13 December 1997
Wan Intan Wan Ahmad Tajuddin	BN (UMNO)	Appointed	27 October 1992	26 October 1995
William Chek Lin Kwai	BN (MCA)	Appointed	18 February 1991	17 February 1994
William Chek Lin Kwai	BN (MCA)	Appointed	16 December 1991	15 December 1994
Wong Kie Yik	BN (MCA)	Appointed	26 February 1986	25 February 1989
Wong Kie Yik	BN (MCA)	Appointed	25 August 1989	24 August 1992
Zainol Abidin Johari	BN (UMNO)	Appointed		
Zaleha Husin	BN (UMNO)	Appointed	13 April 1992	12 April 1995
