= Members of the Dewan Negara, 2nd Malaysian Parliament =

2nd Parliament of Malaysia
←	1st Parliament	3rd Parliament	→

Overview
- Legislative body: Parliament of Malaysia
- Jurisdiction: Malaysia
- Meeting place: Malaysian Houses of Parliament
- Term: 18 May 1964 – 20 March 1969
- Election: Indirect election and appointments
- Website: www.parlimen.gov.my

Dewan Negara
- Members: 50 (until 30 July 1964); 60 (until 8 August 1965); 58
- President: Abdul Rahman Mohamed Yasin (until 31 December 1968); Syed Sheh Barakbah (until 5 February 1969); Mohamad Noah Omar
- Secretary: Ahmad Abdullah (until 1969); Lim Joo Keng
- Party control: Alliance

Sovereign
- Yang di-Pertuan Agong: Tuanku Syed Putra (until 20 September 1965); Tuanku Ismail Nasiruddin Shah

Sessions
- 1st: 19 May 1964 – 31 December 1964
- 2nd: 25 May 1965 – 28 March 1966
- 3rd: 14 June 1966 – 11 March 1967
- 4th: 13 June 1967 – 7 March 1968
- 5th: 5 June 1968 – 26 February 1969

This is a list of the members of the Dewan Negara (Senate) of the Second Parliament of Malaysia.

== Elected by the State Legislative Assembly ==
Senator	Party	State	Term start		Term end	
Abdul Rahim Abdul Manan	Alliance (UMNO)	Negri Sembilan	6 March 1967	(Note: Took and subscribed the Oath on 6 March 1967. Hansard - 6 March 1967)	5 March 1973	
Abdul Rahman Ahmad	Alliance (UMNO)	Perlis	15 March 1963	(Note: Took and subscribed the Oath on 15 March 1963. Hansard - 15 March 1963)	14 March 1969	
Abdul Rahman Mohamed Yasin (President)	Alliance (UMNO)	Johore	11 September 1959	(Note: Took and subscribed the Oath on 11 September 1959. Hansard - 11 September 1959)	10 September 1965	
Abdul Rahman Mohamed Yasin (President)	Alliance (UMNO)	Johore	18 October 1965	(Note: Took and subscribed the Oath on 18 October 1965. Hansard - 18 October 1965)	17 October 1971	
Abdul Wahab Idus	Alliance (UMNO)	Negri Sembilan	11 September 1959		10 September 1965	
Abdullah Abdul Rahman	Alliance (UMNO)	Johore	9 December 1968	(Note: Took and subscribed the Oath on 9 December 1968 under S.O. 4(3). Hansard - 27 January 1969)	8 December 1974	
Abu Bakar Ahmad	Alliance (UMNO)	Trengganu	9 December 1968		8 December 1974	
Ahmad Abdul Manap	Alliance (UMNO)	Malacca	18 December 1965	(Note: Took and subscribed the Oath on 18 December 1965. Hansard - 18 December 1965)	17 December 1971	
Ahmad Abdullah	Alliance (UMNO)	Penang	15 October 1962	(Note: Took and subscribed the Oath on 15 October 1962. Hansard - 15 October 1962)	14 October 1968	
Ahmad Taff	Alliance (UMNO)	Singapore	2 November 1963	(Note: Took and subscribed the Oath on 2 November 1963. Hansard - 2 November 1963)	8 August 1965	(Note: Disqualified on 8 August 1965 under Article 48(1)(f) of the Federal Constitution)
Amaluddin Darus	PMIP	Kelantan	11 September 1959		10 September 1965	
Amaluddin Darus	PMIP	Kelantan	22 October 1968	(Note: Took and subscribed the Oath on 22 October 1968. Hansard - 22 October 1968)	21 October 1974	
Chan Kwong Hon	Alliance (MCA)	Selangor	11 September 1959		10 September 1965	
Chan Kwong Hon	Alliance (MCA)	Selangor	18 December 1965		17 December 1971	
Cheah Seng Khim	Alliance (MCA)	Penang	11 September 1959		10 September 1965	
Cheah Seng Khim	Alliance (MCA)	Penang	18 October 1965		17 October 1971	
Chong Foo Khin	Alliance (MCA)	Negri Sembilan	22 October 1968		21 October 1974	
Da Abdul Jalil Awang	PMIP	Trengganu	11 September 1959		10 September 1965	
Goh Chek Kin	Alliance (MCA)	Trengganu	18 October 1965		17 October 1971	
Hoh Chee Cheong	Alliance (MCA)	Pahang	15 October 1962		14 October 1968	
Ibrahim Yaacob	Alliance (UMNO)	Selangor	27 January 1969	(Note: Took and subscribed the Oath on 27 January 1969. Hansard - 27 January 1969)	26 January 1975	
Joseph Augustine Angian Andulag		Sabah	2 November 1963		1 November 1969	
Joseph Augustine Angian Andulag		Sabah	18 December 1965		17 December 1971	
K. R. Somasundram	Alliance (MIC)	Kedah	19 January 1968	(Note: Took and subscribed the Oath on 19 January 1968 under S.O. 4(3). Hansard - 4 March 1968)	18 January 1974	
Ko Teck Kin		Singapore	2 November 1963		8 August 1965	
Koh Kim Leng	Alliance (MCA)	Malacca	11 September 1959		10 September 1965	
Koh Kim Leng	Alliance (MCA)	Malacca	22 October 1968		21 October 1974	
Lee Foong Yee	Alliance (MCA)	Negri Sembilan	11 September 1959		10 September 1965	
Lim Joo Kong	Alliance (MCA)	Kedah	18 October 1965		4 October 1967	(Note: Resigned on 4 October 1967. Hansard - 20 November 1967)
Md Hanipah Sheikh Alauddin	Alliance (UMNO)	Kedah	4 January 1968	(Note: Took and subscribed the Oath on 4 January 1968 under S.O. 4(3). Hansard - 7 June 1968)	3 January 1974	
Md Hanipah Sheikh Alauddin	Alliance (UMNO)	Kedah	22 October 1968		21 October 1974	
Mohamed Adib Omar	Alliance (UMNO)	Trengganu	15 October 1962		14 October 1968	
Mohamed Salleh Mohamed Ariff	Alliance (UMNO)	Malacca	11 September 1959		10 September 1965	
Ngau Ken Lock	Alliance (MCA)	Pahang	22 October 1968		21 October 1974	
Oyong Lawai Jau	SNAP	Sarawak	2 November 1963		1 November 1969	
Oyong Lawai Jau	SNAP	Sarawak	22 October 1968		21 October 1974	
Pengiran Mohamed Digadong Galpam		Sabah	2 November 1963		1 November 1969	
Pengiran Mohamed Digadong Galpam		Sabah	27 January 1969		26 January 1975	
Raja Rastam Shahrome Raja Said Tauphy	Alliance (UMNO)	Selangor	11 September 1959		10 September 1965	
Sheikh Abu Bakar Yahya	Alliance (UMNO)	Johore	11 September 1959		10 September 1965	
Syed Ahmad Syed Mahmud Shahabuddin	Alliance (UMNO)	Kedah	11 September 1959		10 September 1965	
Syed Darus Syed Hashim	Alliance (UMNO)	Perlis	18 December 1965		17 December 1971	
Syed Hassan Aidid	Alliance (UMNO)	Penang	22 October 1968		21 October 1974	
Tuanku Bujang Tuanku Othman	Sarawak Alliance (BARJASA)	Sarawak	2 November 1963		1 November 1969	
Tuanku Bujang Tuanku Othman	Sarawak Alliance (BARJASA)	Sarawak	18 December 1965		17 December 1971	
Wan Ahmad Wan Daud	Alliance (UMNO)	Perlis	11 September 1959		10 September 1965	
Wan Ibrahim Wan Tanjong	Alliance (UMNO)	Pahang	11 September 1959		10 September 1965	
Wan Ibrahim Wan Tanjong	Alliance (UMNO)	Pahang	18 October 1965		17 October 1971	
Wan Mustapha Wan Ali	PMIP	Kelantan	16 August 1965	(Note: Took and subscribed the Oath on 16 August 1965. Hansard - 16 August 1965)	15 August 1971	
Wan Mustapha Wan Ali	PMIP	Kelantan	18 October 1965		17 October 1971	
Wan Sulaiman Wan Tam	Alliance (UMNO)	Kedah	18 May 1964	(Note: Took and subscribed the Oath on 18 May 1964. Hansard - 18 May 1964)	17 May 1970	
Yahya Ahmad	Alliance (UMNO)	Negri Sembilan	18 October 1965		17 October 1971	
Yahya Ahmad	Alliance (UMNO)	Perak	19 October 1964	(Note: Took and subscribed the Oath on 19 October 1964. Hansard - 19 October 1964)	18 October 1970	
Yahya Ahmad	Alliance (UMNO)	Perak	18 October 1965		17 October 1971	
Yeoh Kian Teik	Alliance (MCA)	Perak	11 September 1959		10 September 1965	
Yeoh Kian Teik	Alliance (MCA)	Perak	14 October 1968	(Note: Took and subscribed the Oath on 14 October 1968 under S.O. 4(3). Hansard - 22 October 1968)	13 October 1974	

== Nominated by the Prime Minister and appointed by the Yang di-Pertuan Agong ==
Senator	Party		Term start		Term end	
A. Arunasalam	Alliance (MIC)	Appointed	11 September 1964	(Note: Took and subscribed the Oath on 11 September 1964. Hansard - 11 September 1964)	10 September 1970	
Abdul Ghafar Baba	Alliance (UMNO)	Appointed	18 April 1968	(Note: Took and subscribed the Oath on 18 April 1968 under S.O. 4(3). Hansard - 7 June 1968)	10 May 1969	(Note: Disqualified under Article 49 of the Federal Constitution following being elected as Member of Parliament for Malacca Utara)
Abdul Samad Osman	Alliance (UMNO)	Appointed	18 May 1964		17 May 1970	
Aishah Ghani	Alliance (UMNO)	Appointed	15 October 1962		14 October 1968	
Aishah Ghani	Alliance (UMNO)	Appointed	22 October 1968		21 October 1974	
Andrew Jika Landau		Appointed	18 May 1964		17 May 1970	
Andrew Jika Landau		Appointed	18 October 1965		17 October 1971	
Athi Nahappan	Alliance (MIC)	Appointed	5 December 1959	(Note: Took and subscribed the Oath on 5 December 1959. Hansard - 5 December 1959)	4 December 1965	
Athi Nahappan	Alliance (MIC)	Appointed	22 October 1968		21 October 1974	
Awang Daud Matusin		Appointed	19 October 1964		18 October 1970	
Bibi Aishah Hamid Don	Alliance (UMNO)	Appointed	19 October 1964		18 October 1970	
C. D. Ismail	Alliance (UMNO)	Appointed	11 September 1964		10 September 1970	
Chan Keong Hon	Alliance (MCA)	Appointed	18 December 1965		17 December 1971	
Cheah Toon Lok	Alliance (MCA)	Appointed	11 September 1959		10 September 1965	
Cheah Toon Lok	Alliance (MCA)	Appointed	22 October 1968		21 October 1974	
Choo Kok Leong	Alliance (MCA)	Appointed	11 September 1959		10 September 1965	
D. S. Dorairaj	Alliance (MIC)	Appointed	11 September 1964		10 September 1970	
E. E. C. Thuraisingham		Appointed	11 September 1959		10 September 1965	
E. E. C. Thuraisingham		Appointed	22 October 1968		21 October 1974	
Foo See Moi	Alliance (MCA)	Appointed	11 September 1964		10 September 1970	
Foo See Moi	Alliance (MCA)	Appointed	22 October 1968		21 October 1974	
G. Louis		Appointed	22 October 1968		21 October 1974	
G. Shelley		Appointed	11 September 1959		10 September 1965	
Gan Teck Yeow	Alliance (MCA)	Appointed	19 October 1964		18 October 1970	
Hong Kim Sui	Alliance (MCA)	Appointed	17 March 1966	(Note: Took and subscribed the Oath under S.O. 4(3). Hansard - 28 March 1966)	16 March 1972	
Hong Teck Guan	Alliance (MCA)	Appointed	18 May 1964		17 May 1970	
Indan Kari		Appointed	20 November 1967	(Note: Took and subscribed the Oath on 20 November 1967. Hansard - 20 November 1967)	19 November 1973	
Indan Kari		Appointed	9 December 1968		8 December 1974	
J. E. S. Crawford		Appointed	11 September 1959		10 September 1965	
J. E. S. Crawford		Appointed	18 October 1965		17 October 1971	
Khoo Teck Puat		Appointed	19 October 1964		18 October 1970	
Lee Yoon Thim	Alliance (MCA)	Appointed	18 May 1964		17 May 1970	
Lee Yoon Thim	Alliance (MCA)	Appointed	18 October 1965		17 October 1971	
Lim Hee Hong	Alliance (MCA)	Appointed	11 September 1959		10 September 1965	
Lim Hee Hong	Alliance (MCA)	Appointed	18 October 1965		17 October 1971	
Mohamad Noah Omar (President)	Alliance (UMNO)	Appointed	11 September 1964		10 September 1970	
Mohamed Said Abu Bakar	Sabah Alliance (USNO)	Appointed	11 September 1964		10 September 1970	
Nik Hassan Nik Yahya	Alliance (UMNO)	Appointed	11 September 1959		10 September 1965	
Nik Hassan Nik Yahya	Alliance (UMNO)	Appointed	18 October 1965		17 October 1971	
Omar Ong Yoke Lin	Alliance (MCA)	Appointed	18 May 1964		17 May 1970	
Pandak Hamid Puteh Jali	Alliance (UMNO)	Appointed	11 September 1959		10 September 1965	
Pandak Hamid Puteh Jali	Alliance (UMNO)	Appointed	18 October 1965		17 October 1971	
S. O. K. Ubaidulla	Alliance (MIC)	Appointed	11 September 1959		10 September 1965	
S. O. K. Ubaidulla	Alliance (MIC)	Appointed	22 October 1968		21 October 1974	
S. P. S. Nathan	Alliance (MIC)	Appointed	11 September 1959		10 September 1965	
S. T. Mani	Alliance (MIC)	Appointed	28 August 1967	(Note: Took and subscribed the Oath on 28 August 1967. Hansard - 28 August 1967)	27 August 1973	
Saidon Kechut	Alliance (UMNO)	Appointed	18 May 1964		17 May 1970	
Saidon Kechut	Alliance (UMNO)	Appointed	18 October 1965		17 October 1971	
Syed Sheh Barakbah (President)	Alliance (UMNO)	Appointed	27 January 1969		26 January 1975	
Tan Tong Hye	Alliance (MCA)	Appointed	11 September 1959		10 September 1965	
Tan Tong Hye	Alliance (MCA)	Appointed	18 October 1965		17 October 1971	
Teh Siew Eng	Alliance (MCA)	Appointed	11 September 1964		10 September 1970	
Wan Sulaiman Wan Tam	Alliance (UMNO)	Appointed	28 March 1966	(Note: Took and subscribed the Oath on 28 March 1966. Hansard - 28 March 1966)	27 March 1972	
William Tan Ho Choon	Sarawak Alliance (SCA)	Appointed	27 December 1963	(Note: Took and subscribed the Oath on 27 December 1963. Hansard - 27 December 1963)	26 December 1969	
William Tan Ho Choon	Sarawak Alliance (SCA)	Appointed	18 October 1965		17 October 1971	
