= Members of the Dewan Negara, 1st Malayan Parliament =

1st Parliament of the Federation of Malaya
2nd Parliament	→

Overview
- Legislative body: Parliament of the Federation of Malaya
- Jurisdiction: Federation of Malaya
- Meeting place: Tunku Abdul Rahman Hall
- Term: 11 September 1959 – 1 March 1964
- Election: Indirect election and appointments
- Website: www.parlimen.gov.my

Dewan Negara
- Members: 38 (until 2 November 1963); 50
- President: Abdul Rahman Mohamed Yasin
- Secretary: Ramli Abdul Hamid (until 1960); Abdul Ghani Mohd Don (until 1961); Shamsuddin Mohd Sidin (until 1962); Ahmad Abdullah
- Party control: Alliance

Sovereign
- Yang di-Pertuan Agong: Tuanku Abdul Rahman (until 1 April 1960); Tuanku Hisamuddin Alam Shah (until 1 September 1960); Tuanku Syed Putra

Sessions
- 1st: 11 September 1959 – ??
- 2nd: 19 April 1960 – ??
- 3rd: 19 April 1961 – ??
- 4th: 25 April 1962 – 15 March 1963
- 5th: 22 May 1963 – 13 January 1964

This is a list of the members of the Dewan Negara (Senate) of the First Parliament of the Federation of Malaya (known as the Parliament of Malaysia after 2 November 1963). There were 38 senators (22 are elected by the state legislative assemblies, with two senators for each state in the Federation, while the other 16 are appointed by the Yang di-Pertuan Agong (King)) in this initial parliament, increasing to 50 senators (28 are elected by the state legislative assemblies, with two senators for each state in the Federation, while the other 22 are appointed by the Yang di-Pertuan Agong (King)) after the establishment of the Parliament of Malaysia.

== Elected by the State Legislative Assembly ==
Senator	Party	State	Term start		Term end	
Abbas Mohamed	PMIP	Trengganu	11 September 1959	(Note: Took and subscribed the Oath on 11 September 1959. Hansard - 11 September 1959)	10 September 1965	
Abdul Rahman Ahmad	Alliance (UMNO)	Perlis	15 March 1963	(Note: Took and subscribed the Oath on 15 March 1963. Hansard - 15 March 1963)	14 March 1969	
Abdul Rahman Mohamed Yasin (President)	Alliance (UMNO)	Johore	11 September 1959		10 September 1965	
Abdul Wahab Idus	Alliance (UMNO)	Negri Sembilan	11 September 1959		10 September 1965	
Abdullah Ishak	Alliance (UMNO)	Perlis	21 December 1960	(Note: Took and subscribed the Oath on 21 December 1960. Hansard - 21 December 1960)	20 December 1966	
Ahmad Abdullah	Alliance (UMNO)	Penang	15 October 1962	(Note: Took and subscribed the Oath on 15 October 1962. Hansard - 15 October 1962)	14 October 1968	
Ahmad Said	Alliance (UMNO)	Perak	11 September 1959		10 September 1965	
Ahmad Taff	Alliance (UMNO)	Singapore	2 November 1963	(Note: Took and subscribed the Oath on 2 November 1963. Hansard - 2 November 1963)	8 August 1965 (Note: Disqualified on 8 August 1965 under Article 48(1)(f) of the Federal Constitution)	
Amaluddin Darus	PMIP	Kelantan	11 September 1959		10 September 1965	
Chan Kwong Hon	Alliance (MCA)	Selangor	11 September 1959		10 September 1965	
Cheah Seng Khim	Alliance (MCA)	Penang	11 September 1959		10 September 1965	
Da Abdul Jalil Awang	PMIP	Trengganu	11 September 1959		10 September 1965	
Hashim Awang	Alliance (UMNO)	Penang	11 September 1959		10 September 1965	
Hoh Chee Cheong	Alliance (MCA)	Pahang	15 October 1962		14 October 1968	
Joseph Augustine Angian Andulag		Sabah	2 November 1963		1 November 1969	
Ko Teck Kin		Singapore	2 November 1963		8 August 1965	
Koh Kim Leng	Alliance (MCA)	Malacca	11 September 1959		10 September 1965	
Lee Foong Yee	Alliance (MCA)	Negri Sembilan	11 September 1959		10 September 1965	
Mohamed Adib Omar	Alliance (UMNO)	Trengganu	15 October 1962		14 October 1968	
Mohamed Salleh Mohamed Ariff	Alliance (UMNO)	Malacca	11 September 1959		10 September 1965	
Mohamed Zahir Ismail	Alliance (UMNO)	Kedah	11 September 1959		10 September 1965	
Nik Mohamed Adeeb Nik Mohamed	PMIP	Kelantan	11 September 1959		4 April 1964	(Note: Died in office on 4 April 1964. Hansard - 11 September 1964)
Oyong Lawai Jau	SNAP	Sarawak	2 November 1963		1 November 1969	
Pengiran Mohamed Digadong Galpam		Sabah	2 November 1963		1 November 1969	
Raja Rastam Shahrome Raja Said Tauphy	Alliance (UMNO)	Selangor	11 September 1959		10 September 1965	
Sheikh Abu Bakar Yahya	Alliance (UMNO)	Johore	11 September 1959		10 September 1965	
Syed Ahmad Syed Mahmud Shahabuddin	Alliance (UMNO)	Kedah	11 September 1959		10 September 1965	
Syed Bahaldin Syed Noh	Alliance (UMNO)	Perlis	11 September 1959		1962	(Note: Resigned)
Tuanku Bujang Tuanku Othman	Sarawak Alliance (BARJASA)	Sarawak	2 November 1963		1 November 1969	
Wan Ahmad Wan Daud	Alliance (UMNO)	Perlis	11 September 1959		10 September 1965	
Wan Ibrahim Wan Tanjong	Alliance (UMNO)	Pahang	11 September 1959		10 September 1965	
Yap Khen Van	Alliance (MCA)	Pahang	11 September 1959		10 September 1965	
Yeoh Kian Teik	Alliance (MCA)	Perak	11 September 1959		10 September 1965	

== Nominated by the Prime Minister and appointed by the Yang di-Pertuan Agong ==
Senator	Party	Term start		Term end	
A. M. Abu Bakar	Alliance (UMNO)	11 September 1959		10 September 1965	
Abang Mustapha Abang Moasili		27 December 1963	(Note: Took and subscribed the Oath on 27 December 1963. Hansard - 27 December 1963)	26 December 1969	
Abdul Hamid Mahmud	Alliance (UMNO)	11 September 1959		10 September 1965	
Aishah Ghani	Alliance (UMNO)	15 October 1962		14 October 1968	
Athi Nahappan	Alliance (MIC)	5 December 1959	(Note: Took and subscribed the Oath on 5 December 1959. Hansard - 5 December 1959)	4 December 1965	
Cheah Toon Lok	Alliance (MCA)	11 September 1959		10 September 1965	
Choo Kok Leong	Alliance (MCA)	11 September 1959		10 September 1965	
E. E. C. Thuraisingham		11 September 1959		10 September 1965	
Engku Muhsein Abdul Kadir	Alliance (UMNO)	11 September 1959		10 September 1965	
G. Shelley		11 September 1959		10 September 1965	
J. E. S. Crawford		11 September 1959		10 September 1965	
Khaw Kai Boh	Alliance (MCA)	15 March 1963		14 March 1969	
Leong Yew Koh	Alliance (MCA)	11 September 1959		12 January 1963	(Note: Died in office on 12 January 1963. Hansard - 15 March 1963)
Lim Hee Hong	Alliance (MCA)	11 September 1959		10 September 1965	
Mohamed Ghazali Jawi	Alliance (UMNO)	3 June 1963	(Note: Took and subscribed the Oath on 3 June 1963. Hansard - 3 June 1963)	2 June 1969	
Nik Hassan Nik Yahya	Alliance (UMNO)	11 September 1959		10 September 1965	
Pandak Hamid Puteh Jali	Alliance (UMNO)	11 September 1959		10 September 1965	
S. O. K. Ubaidulla	Alliance (MIC)	11 September 1959		10 September 1965	
S. P. S. Nathan	Alliance (MIC)	11 September 1959		10 September 1965	
Tan Tong Hye	Alliance (MCA)	11 September 1959		10 September 1965	
William Tan Ho Choon	Sarawak Alliance (SCA)	27 December 1963		26 December 1969	

== Death in office ==
- Leong Yew Koh (d. 12 January 1963)
- Nik Mohamed Adeeb Nik Mohamed (d. 4 April 1964)
