= Malaysian Leprosy Relief Association =

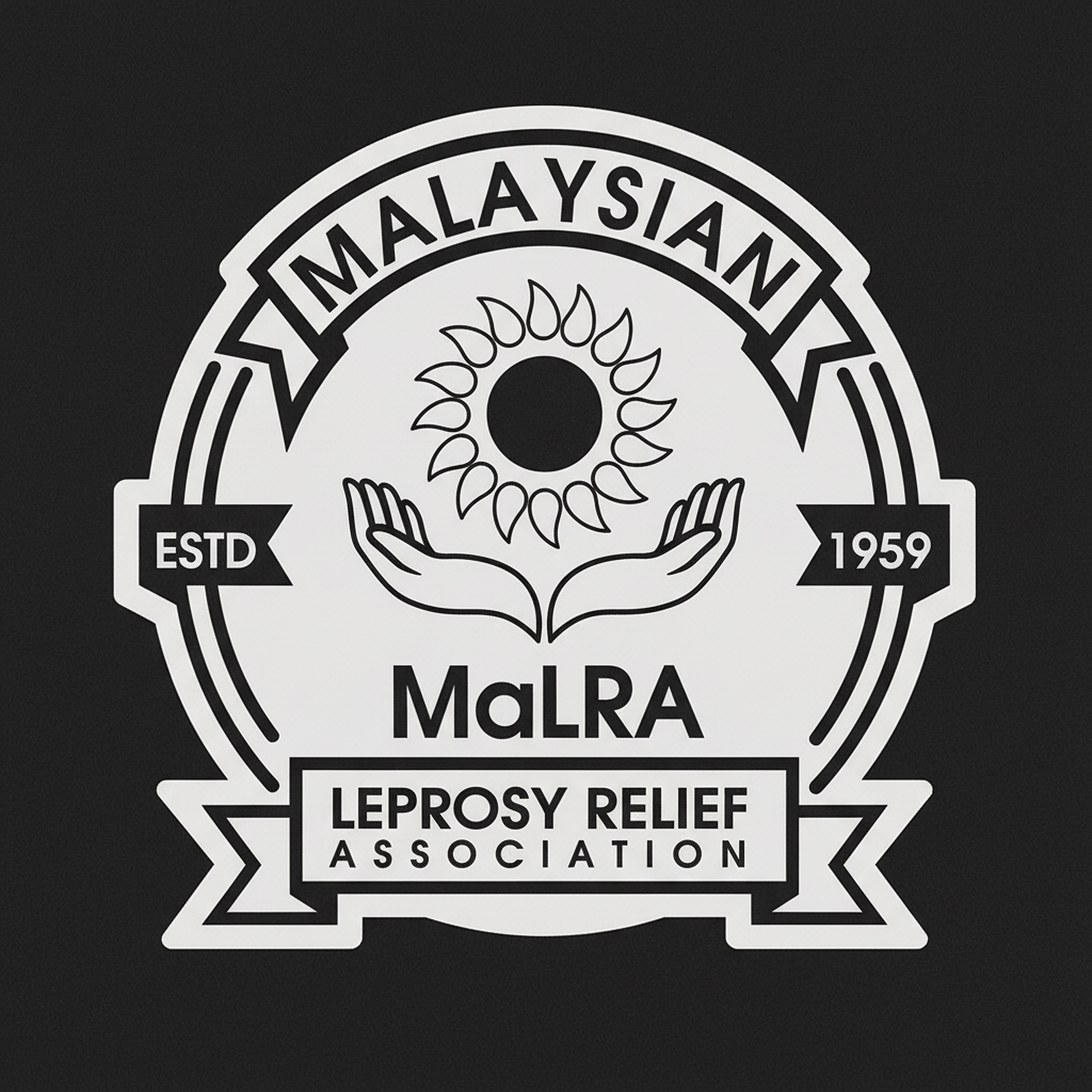
- Formation: 1959 in Kuala Lumpur, Malaysia
- Founder: Tan Sri Tan Tong Hye
- Type: Association
- Purpose: Alleviation of the suffering of leprosy patients
- Headquarters: Taman Tun Dr Ismail, Kuala Lumpur, Malaysia
- Region served: Malaysia
- Method: Financial relief and aid; provision of medication, prosthetics, supplies; public awareness campaigns targeted at symptom identification and treatment.
- President: Datuk Seri Rajendran Ramasamy
- Executive Secretary General: Tan Yi Ming
- Website: https://www.malra.org.my/

The Malaysian Leprosy Relief Association (MALRA) (Malay: Persatuan Pemulihan Kusta Malaysia) is a non-governmental organisation in Malaysia, established in 1959 to provide social and economic support for Malaysian citizens affected by leprosy.

Under the Leper Enactment Act of 1926, individuals diagnosed with leprosy were subject to compulsory isolation, with many patients housed at the Sungai Buloh Leprosarium.

MALRA participated in efforts to shift Malaysia's public health approach from segregation to community-based reintegration, including initiatives to support the retraining of patients and former patients for reintegration into society.

== History ==
MALRA was founded in 1959 by Tan Sri T.H. Tan, a journalist and politician who served as the first honorary Secretary-General of the Alliance Party. The organisation was proposed to address socio-economic challenges faced by patients not covered by government medical programmes, following a visit to the Sungai Buloh Leprosarium.

The association was established with the support of Malaysia's first Prime Minister, Tunku Abdul Rahman. In its early years, MALRA raised funds through national "Flower Day" campaigns to provide amenities and financial support to patients at major leprosaria, including Sungai Buloh, Pulau Jerejak, and Tampoi.

Leadership has remained connected to the Tan family, with Tan Sri T.H. Tan's son, Datuk Roger Tan, serving as the forth President from 2010 to 2012, and his grandson, Tan Yi Ming, currently serving as the Executive Secretary General of MALRA.

== Logo ==
MALRA's original logo was in use between 1959 and 2021 and featured a nurse with a red crescent headdress representing care, the sun representing growth and health, and a red flower, to symbolise love and compassion.

The association's updated logo was unveiled in 2021 which incorporating elements of the original design, with a horizontal mid-sectioned ribbon inserted to represent heritage, tradition and the year of MALRA's formation. The sun and flower were combined into a sunflower with a red core, with the image of a nurse replaced by a pair of upturned hands forming leaves under the flower, retaining the symbolic meaning of the original logo.

== Role in Leprosy Control ==
MALRA provides supplementary support to patients receiving primary medical treatment from the Malaysian Ministry of Health and acts as the main organisation for social rehabilitation and reintegration of leprosy patients.

- National Leprosy Control Programme (1969): MALRA collaborated with the Malaysian government to shift leprosy treatment from isolated settlements to decentralized outpatient care in public hospitals. These combined contributed to Malaysia eliminating leprosy as a public health issue by 1994.
- Economic Reintegration: MALRA established and managed rubber and palm oil estates and poultry farms to provide employment opportunities for residents of leprosaria. The organisation also provides financial assistance to patients facing economic hardship or permanent disability caused by leprosy.
- Advocacy and Education: MALRA supports initiatives to raise public awareness of leprosy and reduce social stigma through public events, conferences, and publications. It has also supported the Ministry of Health's LAKAR programme, which focuses on training, detection, treatment, and referral in managing leprosy cases.

== Governance and Structure ==
MALRA was established as an association under the Registrar of Societies, Malaysia.

The association is governed by an executive committee, with members elected from among its membership. MALRA operates as a federal association with nine branches across Malaysia covering:

- Johor
- Kedah
- Kelantan
- Pahang
- Penang
- Sabah
- Sarawak
- Selangor
- Terengganu

MALRA also conducts activities in the state of Perak, despite not currently having a branch there.

== See also ==
- Philanthropy
