= Mohamed Yaacob =

Malaysian politician

Yang Berbahagia Dato' Bentara Kanan Tan Sri Datuk Amar Haji Mohamed Yaacob PSM SPMK DA PGDK SMT

12th President of the Dewan Negara
- In office 10 December 1997 – 5 December 2000
- Monarchs: Ja'afar (1997–1999); Salahuddin (1999–2000)
- Preceded by: Adam Kadir
- Succeeded by: Michael Chen Wing Sum

Menteri Besar of Kelantan
- In office 23 March 1978 – 21 October 1990
- Monarchs: Yahya Petra (1978–1979); Ismail Petra (1979–1990)
- Preceded by: Mohamed Nasir
- Succeeded by: Nik Abdul Aziz Nik Mat

Minister of Public Enterprises
- In office 15 January 1976 – 10 March 1978
- Monarch: Yahya Petra
- Prime Minister: Hussein Onn
- Deputy: Mustapha Abdul Jabbar
- Preceded by: Hussein Onn (Minister of Coordination of Public Corporations)
- Succeeded by: Abdul Manan Othman
- Constituency: Tanah Merah

Minister of Energy, Technology and Research
- In office 26 August 1974 – 14 January 1976
- Monarchs: Abdul Halim (1974–75); Yahya Petra (1975–76)
- Prime Minister: Abdul Razak Hussein
- Preceded by: Lee San Choon
- Succeeded by: Ong Kee Hui
- Constituency: Tanah Merah

Minister of Education
- In office 3 August 1973 – 24 August 1974
- Monarch: Abdul Halim
- Prime Minister: Abdul Razak Hussein
- Preceded by: Hussein Onn
- Succeeded by: Mahathir Mohamad
- Constituency: Tanah Merah

Personal details
- Born: Mohamed bin Yaacob; 3 January 1926 Tumpat, Kelantan, Unfederated Malay States, British Malaya (now Malaysia)
- Died: 8 September 2009 (aged 83) Kuala Lumpur, Malaysia
- Resting place: Bukit Kiara Muslim Cemetery, Kuala Lumpur
- Party: United Malays National Organisation (UMNO)
- Other political affiliations: Barisan Nasional (BN)
- Spouse: Nik Azizah Nik Ahmad
- Occupation: Politician
- Profession: Lawyer

Mohamed bin Yaacob (3 January 1926 – 8 September 2009) was a Malaysian politician who served as the Menteri Besar (Chief Minister) of Kelantan from 1978 to 1990.

Prior to his appointment as Menteri Besar, he worked as a lawyer of the High Court of Malaya and was posted in Johor, Terengganu and Perak states. Later, he won the 1969 elections for the seat of Tanah Merah, which marked his foray into politics by firstly serving as Deputy Minister of Home Affairs from 1970 to 1972, followed by his appointment as Deputy Minister of Finance for six months from January to July 1973.

A cabinet reshuffle followed soon after the death of Tun Dr. Ismail Abdul Rahman, in which he was promoted as a full cabinet minister by holding the portfolio of Minister of Education for a year from August 1973 until the 1974 elections, in which his victory led to his reappointment to another portfolio, whereby he was appointed Minister of Energy, Technology and Research from August 1974 to February 1976 and lastly before his resignation from federal politics in order to be his state's Menteri Besar, he was finally appointed Minister of Public Enterprises from February 1976 until his victory in the 1978 Kelantan state election, which immediately followed his resignation from federal politics, in order to pave way for his appointment as Menteri Besar of Kelantan.

== Honours ==
- Malaysia
  - Commander of the Order of Loyalty to the Crown of Malaysia (PSM) – Tan Sri (1988)
- Kelantan
  - Knight Grand Commander of the Order of the Crown of Kelantan (SPMK) – Dato' (1976)
  - Dato' Bentara Kanan
- Sarawak
  - Knight Commander of the Order of the Star of Hornbill Sarawak (DA) – Datuk Amar (1982)
- Sabah
  - Commander of the Order of Kinabalu (PGDK) – Datuk (1984)
- Terengganu
  - Companion of the Order of the Crown of Terengganu (SMT) (1986)

== See also ==
- 1977 Kelantan Emergency
