= Kinabalu (federal constituency) =

Sabah constituency

Defunct federal constituency
- Legislature: Dewan Rakyat
- Constituency created: 1966
- Constituency abolished: 2004
- First contested: 1969
- Last contested: 1999

Kinabalu was a federal constituency in Sabah, Malaysia, that was represented in the Dewan Rakyat from 1969 to 2004.

The federal constituency was created in the 1966 redistribution and was mandated to return a single member to the Dewan Rakyat under the first past the post voting system.

== History ==
It was abolished in 2004 when it was redistributed.

=== Representation history ===
Members of Parliament for Kinabalu
Parliament	No	Years	Member	Party	Vote Share
Constituency created
		1969-1971	Parliament was suspended		
3rd	P115	1971-1973	Abdul Ghani Gilong (عبدالغني ڬيلوڠ)	USNO	Uncontested
3rd	P115	1973-1974	Abdul Ghani Gilong (عبدالغني ڬيلوڠ)	BN (USNO)	Uncontested
4th	P120	1974-1978	Abdul Ghani Gilong (عبدالغني ڬيلوڠ)	BN (USNO)	Uncontested
5th	P120	1978-1982	Mark Koding	Independent	7,649; 63.50%
6th	P120	1982-1986	Mark Koding	BN (BERJAYA)	Uncontested
7th	P138	1986-1990	Kasitah Gaddam (قصيدة بن قدم)	BN (USNO)	Uncontested
8th	P138	1990-1995	Osman Minudin	GR (PBS)	7,419; 52.23%
9th	P156	1995-1999	Henrynus Amin	GR (PBS)	7,973; 48.10%
10th	P156	1999-2004	Bernard Giluk Dompok	BN (UPKO)	11,723; 63.36%
Constituency abolished, split into Keningau and Ranau

=== State constituency ===
Parliamentary constituency	State constituency					
Parliamentary constituency	1967–1974	1974–1985	1985–1995	1995–2004	2004–2020	2020–present
Kinabalu		Kundasang				
Kinabalu	Ranau					
Kinabalu	Tambunan					

=== Historical boundaries ===
State Constituency	Area			
State Constituency	1966	1974	1984	1994
Kundasang		Kokob; Kundasang; Langsat; Merungin; Poring	Kokob; Kundasang; Pinawantai; Poring; Tarawas	
Ranau	Karanaan; Kundasang; Paginatan; Poring; Ranau	Dombotuon; Karanaan; Matopang; Paginatan; Ranau		
Tambunan	Kuala Monsok; Kirokot; Sunsuron; Rompok; Tambunan			

== Election results ==
Malaysian general election, 1999
Party	Candidate	Votes	%	∆%
BN	Bernard Giluk Dompok	11,723	63.36	▲24.38
PBS	Janimin Saliun	6,300	34.05	▼14.05
Independent	Wasimin Rashim	175	0.95	▲0.95
Total valid votes		18,198	98.36	
Total rejected ballots		199	1.08	
Unreturned ballots		105	0.57	
Turnout		18,502	72.44	▼0.87
Registered electors		25,541		
Majority		5,423	29.31	▲20.19
BN gain from PBS		Swing		+14.22

Malaysian general election, 1995
Party	Candidate	Votes	%	∆%
PBS	Henrynus Amin	7,973	48.10	▼4.13
BN	Osman @ Othman Minudin	6,462	38.98	▼7.66
Independent	Asmin Nasir	1,883	11.36	▲11.36
Independent	Shariff Sadi @ Biun Intang	70	0.42	▲0.42
Total valid votes		16,388	98.87	
Total rejected ballots		177	1.07	
Unreturned ballots		11	0.07	
Turnout		16,576	73.31	▲5.57
Registered electors		22,611		
Majority		1,511	9.12	▲3.53
PBS hold		Swing		+1.77

Malaysian general election, 1990
Party	Candidate	Votes	%	∆%
PBS	Osman @ Othman Minudin	7,419	52.23	▲52.23
AKAR	Mark Koding	6,625	46.64	▲46.64
Total valid votes		14,044	98.87	
Total rejected ballots		160	1.13	
Unreturned ballots		0	0.00	
Turnout		14,204	67.74	
Registered electors		20,968		
Majority		794	5.59	
PBS gain from BN		Swing		N/A

Malaysian general election, 1986
Party	Candidate	Votes	%	∆%
On the nomination day, Kasitah Gaddam won uncontested.
BN	Kasitah Gaddam			
Total valid votes			100.00	
Total rejected ballots				
Unreturned ballots				
Turnout				
Registered electors		16,793		
Majority				
BN hold		Swing		N/A

Malaysian general election, 1982
Party	Candidate	Votes	%	∆%
On the nomination day, Mark Koding won uncontested.
BN	Mark Koding			N/A
Total valid votes			100.00	
Total rejected ballots				
Unreturned ballots				
Turnout				
Registered electors		18,583		
Majority				
BN gain from Independent		Swing		N/A

Malaysian general election, 1978
Party	Candidate	Votes	%	∆%
Independent	Mark Koding	7,649	63.50	▲63.50
BN	Abdul Ghani Gilong	4,396	36.50	▲36.50
Total valid votes		12,045	100.00	
Total rejected ballots		235	0.00	
Unreturned ballots		0	0.00	
Turnout		12,280	77.50	
Registered electors		15,845		
Majority		3,253	27.00	
Independent gain from BN		Swing		N/A

Malaysian general election, 1974
Party	Candidate	Votes	%	∆%
On the nomination day, Abdul Ghani Gilong won uncontested.
BN	Abdul Ghani Gilong			
Total valid votes			100.00	
Total rejected ballots				
Unreturned ballots				
Turnout				
Registered electors		12,814		
Majority				
BN hold		Swing		N/A

Malaysian general election, 1969
Party	Candidate	Votes	%
On the nomination day, Abdul Ghani Gilong won uncontested.
USNO	Abdul Ghani Gilong		
Total valid votes			100.00
Total rejected ballots			
Unreturned ballots			
Turnout			
Registered electors		12,387	
Majority			
This was a new constituency created.
