= Halal Development Corporation =

Malaysian government agency

Halal Development Corporation Berhad (HDC)
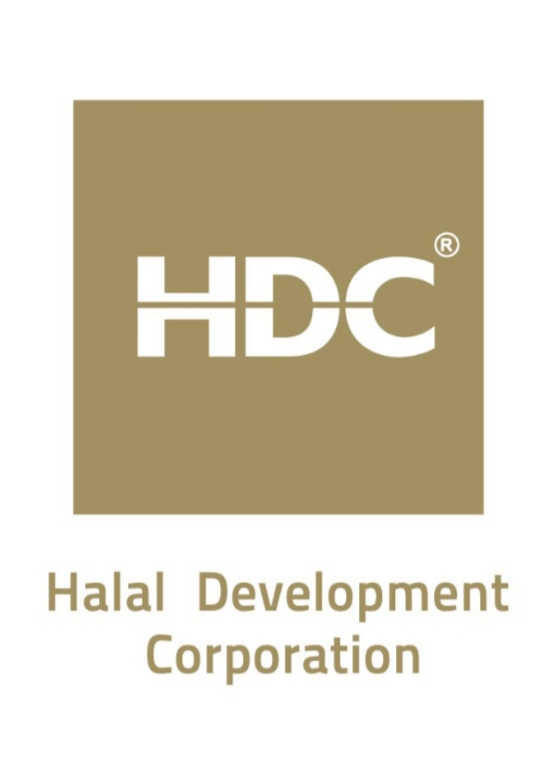
- Native name: Perbadanan Pembangunan Halal Berhad
- Type: State-owned enterprise
- Founded: 18 September 2006
- Headquarters: 5.02, Level 5, KPMG Tower, First Avenue, Persiaran Bandar Utama, 47800 Petaling Jaya, Selangor, Malaysia
- Key people: Hairol Ariffein Sahari, Chief Executive Officer
- Parent: Ministry of Investment, Trade and Industry (Malaysia)
- Website: www.hdcglobal.com

Halal Development Corporation Berhad, or HDC (formerly known as Halal Industry Development Corporation Sdn Bhd), is a Malaysian federal government agency mandated as the custodian of Malaysia's Halal economy. Its mission is to generate opportunities for the community of stakeholders within Malaysia's Halal ecosystem.

HDC was founded on September 18, 2006, as a government-backed organization to consolidate the various industry clusters that make up Malaysia's halal sector, to assist in increasing the economic contribution of the country's Halal sector. HDC designs and implements programs for Micro, Small and Medium Enterprises (MSME) and Large Multinational Corporations. HDC also partners with public sector organizations at the federal and state levels to support the advancement of Halal standards and commerce in Malaysia.

Halal-Welt has noted HDC's role in promoting Malaysia as a hub for Halal in Asia. HDC developed the Halal Industry Masterplan 2008-2020 and, more recently, the Halal Industry Master Plan 2030 (HIMP).

As of 2019, HDC had begun expanding its services and partnerships to meet increasing demand. This included expansion into Japan, Korea, and Taiwan.

HDC is also the secretariat of Malaysia's Halal Industry Development Council (MPIH), chaired by Malaysia's deputy prime minister. HDC is the central coordinator of four key objectives;

1. Formulate strategic policy and monitoring
2. Certification enhancement and enforcement
3. Standard development and traceability
4. Industry development and Entrepreneurial Culture

Hairol Ariffein Sahari currently serves as the Executive Officer after the departure of previous CEO Dato Seri Jamil Bidin. As of 18 May 2023, HDC appointed Khairul Azwan Harun as its chairman, replacing Dato' Mahmud Abbas earlier.

== Notable events ==
In October 2013, HDC signed a memorandum of understanding (MoU) with SME Bank and Bumiputera Agenda Steering Unit for the establishment of a RM280 million Halal Development Fund. The fund is intended to the develop the halal industry and ready Bumiputera entrepreneurs in Malaysia for international markets.

In March 2019, HDC signed an MoU with the Korea-Trade Investment Promotion Agency to enhance bilateral trade and investment between both countries.

On October 7, HDC signed an MoU with Taiwan's Food Industry Research and Development Institute (FIRDI) to support the advancement of Taiwan's Halal Industry.

In early February 2019, HDC announced a partnership with Acrosx Incorporated Japan to provide advisory, capacity building and technical assistance to strengthen the business landscape for Muslim-friendly products and services in Japan.
