= Members of the Dewan Negara, 11th Malaysian Parliament =

11th Parliament of Malaysia
←	10th Parliament	12th Parliament	→

Overview
- Legislative body: Parliament of Malaysia
- Jurisdiction: Malaysia
- Meeting place: Malaysian Houses of Parliament
- Term: 17 May 2004 – 13 February 2008
- Election: Indirect election and appointments
- Website: www.parlimen.gov.my

Dewan Negara
- Members: 70
- President: Abdul Hamid Pawanteh
- Deputy President: Wong Foon Meng
- Secretary: Zamani Sulaiman
- Party control: Barisan Nasional

Sovereign
- Yang di-Pertuan Agong: Tuanku Syed Sirajuddin (until 12 December 2006); Tuanku Mizan Zainal Abidin

Sessions
- 1st: 18 May 2004 – 19 January 2005
- 2nd: 21 March 2005 – 26 December 2005
- 3rd: 13 March 2006 – 21 December 2006
- 4th: 19 March 2007 – 24 December 2007

This is a list of the members of the Dewan Negara (Senate) of the Eleventh Parliament of Malaysia.

== Elected by the State Legislative Assembly ==
Senator	Party	State	Term start	Term end
Ahmad Husin	BN (UMNO)	Perlis	8 May 2006	7 May 2009
Armani Mahiruddin	BN (UMNO)	Sabah	20 December 2005	19 December 2008
Arzmi Abdul Hamid	BN (UMNO)	Kedah		
Azlan Osman	BN (UMNO)	Perak	14 November 2006	13 November 2009
Benedict Bujang Tembak	BN (PBB)	Sarawak	27 December 1999	26 December 2002
Benedict Bujang Tembak	BN (PBB)	Sarawak	18 November 2002	17 November 2005
Chiam Yong Tee	BN (MCA)	Perak	8 January 2004	7 January 2007
Chin Fook Weng	BN (Gerakan)	Penang		
Chua Kim Chuan	BN (MCA)	Kedah	3 May 2005	2 May 2008
Empiang Jabu	BN (PBB)	Sarawak	28 June 2004	27 June 2007
Empiang Jabu	BN (PBB)	Sarawak	11 July 2007	10 July 2010
Gooi Hoe Hin	BN (Gerakan)	Penang	16 June 2006	15 June 2009
Halimah Hamzah	BN (UMNO)	Pahang		
Hamzah Zainudin	BN (UMNO)	Perak	8 September 2000	7 September 2003
Hamzah Zainudin	BN (UMNO)	Perak	17 September 2003	16 September 2006
Hassan Shukri	PAS	Terengganu	27 December 1999	26 December 2002
Hazizah Mohd. Sultan	BN (UMNO)	Malacca	27 December 1999	26 December 2002
Heng Seai Kie	BN (MCA)	Perak	6 December 2006	5 December 2009
Hiang A Li	BN (MCA)	Pahang	8 May 2006	7 May 2009
Idris Buang	BN (PBB)	Sarawak	7 December 2005	6 December 2008
Ikhwan Salim Sujak	BN (UMNO)	Selangor	8 January 2004	7 January 2007
Ikhwan Salim Sujak	BN (UMNO)	Selangor	6 December 2006	5 December 2009
Ismail Kassim	BN (UMNO)	Appointed		
Ismail Kassim	BN (UMNO)	Perlis	15 May 2006	14 May 2009
Kalakau Untol	BN (UPKO)	Sabah	3 November 2003	2 November 2006
Karim Ghani	BN (UMNO)	Sabah	27 December 1999	26 December 2002
Khoo Soo Seang	BN (MCA)	Johor		
Latiff Thamby Chik	BN (UMNO)	Malacca		
Lee Chee Keong	BN (MCA)	Negeri Sembilan	20 December 2005	19 December 2008
Lim Sing @ Lam Kam Sang	BN (MCA)	Pahang	28 April 2003	27 April 2006
Maijol Mahap	BN (UPKO)	Sabah	6 December 2006	5 December 2009
Mariah Abdullah	BN (UMNO)	Perlis		
Mohd Puad Zarkashi	BN (UMNO)	Johor	13 October 2004	12 October 2007
Mumtaz Md Nawi	PAS	Kelantan	19 July 2006	18 July 2009
Nordiana Shafie	BN (UMNO)	Terengganu	23 December 2005	22 December 2008
Omar Faudzar	BN (UMNO)	Penang		
Omar Faudzar	BN (UMNO)	Penang	16 June 2006	15 June 2009
Poh Mok Hua @ Poh Bak Hoe	BN (MCA)	Malacca		
Safinah Jusoh	PAS	Terengganu	27 December 1999	26 December 2002
Samsiah Samsudin	BN (UMNO)	Appointed		
Samsiah Samsudin	BN (UMNO)	Negeri Sembilan	14 December 2006	13 December 2009
Siti Rokiah Mohd. Zabidin	BN (UMNO)	Pahang	8 May 2006	7 May 2009
Siti Zailah Mohd Yusoff	PAS	Kelantan		
Siti Zailah Mohd Yusoff	PAS	Kelantan	1 July 2003	30 June 2006
Soon Tian Szu	BN (MCA)	Malacca	26 April 2006	25 April 2009
Tan Cheng Tee	BN (MCA)	Negeri Sembilan	11 November 2002	10 November 2005
Tay Puay Chuan	BN (MCA)	Johor	13 October 2004	12 October 2007
Wan Ahmad Farid Wan Salleh	BN (UMNO)	Terengganu	23 December 2005	22 December 2008
Wan Nordin Che Murat	BN (UMNO)	Perlis		
Wan Nordin Che Murat	BN (UMNO)	Perlis	8 May 2006	7 May 2009
Wan Ubaidah Omar	PAS	Kelantan	1 July 2003	30 June 2006
Wan Ubaidah Omar	PAS	Kelantan	19 July 2006	18 July 2009
Wilson Sagamany Paul Devasagayam	BN (MIC)	Selangor	8 January 2004	7 January 2007
Yaakob Mohammad	BN (UMNO)	Kedah		
Yaakob Mohammad	BN (UMNO)	Kedah	3 May 2005	2 May 2008
Yip Kum Fook	BN (MCA)	Selangor	6 December 2006	5 December 2009

== Nominated by the Prime Minister and appointed by the Yang di-Pertuan Agong ==
Senator	Party		Term start	Term end
Abdul Hamid Pawanteh (President)	BN (UMNO)	Appointed		
Abdul Hamid Pawanteh (President)	BN (UMNO)	Appointed	19 July 2006	18 July 2009
Abdul Raman Suliman	BN (UMNO)	Appointed	26 August 2004	25 August 2007
Abdul Rashid Ngah	BN (UMNO)	Appointed	6 December 2004	5 December 2007
Abdul Rashid Ngah	BN (UMNO)	Appointed	13 December 2007	12 December 2010
Agnes Shim Tshin Nyuk	BN (MCA)	Appointed		
Azizah Abdul Samad	BN (UMNO)	Appointed	26 August 2004	25 August 2007
Che Jam Haron	BN (UMNO)	Appointed	27 July 1999	26 July 2002
Chew Vun Ming	BN (MCA)	Appointed	22 February 2006	21 February 2009
Chiw Tiang Chai	BN (PPP)	Appointed	14 October 2005	13 October 2008
Dayang Mahani Pengiran Ahmad Raffae	BN (UMNO)	Appointed	21 July 2004	20 July 2007
Fatanah Ahmad	BN (UMNO)	Appointed	13 December 2004	12 December 2007
Hii Tiong Kuoh	BN (SUPP)	Appointed	6 December 2004	5 December 2007
Ismail Md. Salleh	IND	Appointed	18 December 2007	17 December 2010
Jaya Partiban	BN (MIC)	Appointed		
Jins Shamsuddin	BN (UMNO)	Appointed	13 October 2004	12 October 2007
Kamaruddin Ambok	BN (UMNO)	Appointed	26 August 2004	25 August 2007
Lee Chong Meng	BN (MCA)	Appointed	22 February 2006	21 February 2009
Lee Sing Chooi	BN (MCA)	Appointed	2 October 2003	1 October 2006
Lee Sing Chooi	BN (MCA)	Appointed	14 October 2006	13 October 2009
Loga Chitra M. Govindasamy	BN (MIC)	Appointed	6 April 2007	5 April 2010
M. Krishnan	BN (MIC)	Appointed		
Mohd Effendi Norwawi	BN (PBB)	Appointed	16 February 2006	15 February 2009
Mohd. Fuad Ahmad	IND	Appointed	13 December 2004	24 April 2006
Muhammad Abdul Ghani	BN (UMNO)	Appointed	8 January 2004	7 January 2007
Muhammad Muhammad Taib	BN (UMNO)	Appointed	17 November 2006	16 November 2009
Munusamy Mareemuthu	BN (MIC)	Appointed	14 October 2005	13 October 2008
Musa Sheikh Fadzir	BN (UMNO)	Appointed	13 December 2004	12 December 2007
Musa Sheikh Fadzir	BN (UMNO)	Appointed	13 December 2007	12 December 2010
Naomi Chong Set Mui	BN (LDP)	Appointed	2 October 2003	1 October 2006
Nik Azizah Nik Yahya	BN (UMNO)	Appointed		
Nik Azizah Nik Yahya	BN (UMNO)	Appointed	17 February 2005	16 February 2008
Nor Azah Awin	BN (UMNO)	Appointed	27 July 1999	26 July 2002
Nor Hayati Onn	BN (UMNO)	Appointed	14 October 2005	13 October 2008
Nor Mohamed Yakcop	BN (UMNO)	Appointed	9 January 2004	8 January 2007
Nor Mohamed Yakcop	BN (UMNO)	Appointed	8 January 2007	7 January 2010
Norraesah Mohamad	BN (UMNO)	Appointed	14 October 2005	13 October 2008
Norsimah Hashim	BN (UMNO)	Appointed	27 July 1999	26 July 2002
Ooi Siew Kim	BN (MCA)	Appointed		
Osman Bungsu	IND	Appointed	2 October 2003	1 October 2006
Osman Bungsu	IND	Appointed	14 October 2006	13 October 2009
Pau Chiong Ung	BN (SPDP)	Appointed		
Puizah Abu Kassim	BN (UMNO)	Appointed	2 August 1999	1 August 2002
Raja Kam Nadayson	BN (MIC)	Appointed	17 February 2005	16 February 2008
Ratnam Muthiah	BN (MIC)	Appointed		
Rawisandran Narayanan	BN (MIC)	Appointed	19 January 2007	18 January 2010
Rhina Bhar	BN (Gerakan)	Appointed	13 October 2004	12 October 2007
Rizuan Abdul Hamid	BN (UMNO)	Appointed	14 October 2005	13 October 2008
Roslan Awang Chik	BN (UMNO)	Appointed	6 December 2004	5 December 2007
Roslan Awang Chik	BN (UMNO)	Appointed	13 December 2007	12 December 2010
Saravanan Murugan	BN (MIC)	Appointed	6 December 2000	5 December 2003
Shamsudin Mehat	BN (UMNO)	Appointed	18 December 2007	17 December 2010
Sharifah Azizah Syed Zain	BN (UMNO)	Appointed	9 March 2004	8 March 2007
Sharifah Azizah Syed Zain	BN (UMNO)	Appointed	9 March 2007	8 March 2010
Sharipah Aminah Syed Mohamed	BN (UMNO)	Appointed	13 December 2004	12 December 2007
Sharipah Aminah Syed Mohamed	BN (UMNO)	Appointed	13 December 2007	12 December 2010
Sim Kheng Hui	BN (SUPP)	Appointed	18 December 2007	17 December 2010
Sinniah Raju	BN (MIC)	Appointed	10 April 2001	9 April 2004
Sinniah Raju	BN (MIC)	Appointed	21 July 2004	8 December 2004
Siw Chun Eam	BN (UMNO)	Appointed	20 December 2005	19 December 2008
Syed Ali Syed Abbas Alhabshee	BN (UMNO)	Appointed		
Syed Ali Syed Abbas Alhabshee	BN (UMNO)	Appointed	26 April 2006	25 April 2009
Syeikh Alias Mustafa	BN (UMNO)	Appointed		
Syeikh Alias Mustafa	BN (UMNO)	Appointed	4 August 2004	21 October 2007
Tajul Urus Mat Zain	BN (UMNO)	Appointed	14 October 2005	13 October 2008
Tan Bon You	BN (MCA)	Appointed	6 August 2004	5 August 2007
Udam @ George Adam Talek	BN (PBB)	Appointed		
Vijayaratnam Seevaratnam	BN (Gerakan)	Appointed	22 February 2006	21 February 2009
Wan Hazani Wan Mohd Nor	BN (UMNO)	Appointed	14 October 2005	13 October 2008
Wan Ramlah Ahmad	BN (UMNO)	Appointed	8 January 2007	7 January 2004
Wan Ramlah Ahmad	BN (UMNO)	Appointed	8 January 2007	7 January 2010
William Lau Kung Hui	BN (SNAP)	Appointed		
Wong Foon Meng (Deputy President)	BN (MCA)	Appointed	13 April 2004	12 April 2007
Wong Foon Meng (Deputy President)	BN (MCA)	7 May 2007	6 May 2010	
Wong Siong Hwee	BN (MCA)			

== Death in office ==
- Sinniah Raju (d. 8 December 2004)
- Mohd. Fuad Ahmad (d. 24 April 2006)
