= Vadiveloo Govindasamy =

Malaysian politician (1931/1932–2024)

Yang Berbahagia Tan Sri Vadiveloo Govindasamy
- வடிவேலு கோவிந்தசாமி

President of the Dewan Negara
- In office 13 April 1992 – 12 June 1995
- Preceded by: Chan Choong Tak
- Succeeded by: Adam Kadir

Senator
- In office 14 December 1994 – 13 December 1997
- In office 16 December 1991 – 15 December 1994

Personal details
- Born: Vadiveloo A/L Govindasamy; 10 January 1932
- Died: October 19, 2024 (aged 92) Universiti Malaya Medical Centre, Kuala Lumpur
- Party: Malaysian Indian Congress (MIC)

Vadiveloo s/o Govindasamy (Tamil: வடிவேலு கோவிந்தசாமி; 10 January 1932 – 19 October 2024) was a Malaysian politician who was president of the Malaysian Senate, serving from 13 April 1992 to 12 June 1995. He was also Secretary-General of the Malaysian Indian Congress. After leaving parliament, Vadiveloo continued working as CEO of Tafe College and as a trustee of the Maju Institute of Educational Development.

Vadiveloo died on 19 October 2024, at the age of 92.

== Honours ==
- Malaysia
  - Commander of the Order of Loyalty to the Crown of Malaysia (PSM) – Tan Sri (1994)
- Selangor
  - Knight Commander of the Order of the Crown of Selangor (DPMS) – Dato' (1989)

=== Foreign honours ===
- India
  - Pravasi Bharatiya Samman (2009)
