= Ahmad Ismail (Malaysian politician) =

Malaysian politician

Yang Berbahagia Datuk Ahmad Ismail
- أحمد إسماعيل

Former chief of UMNO Bukit Bendera (Penang Hill)

Personal details
- Born: 1955 (age 70–71)
- Party: UMNO-BN
- Occupation: Politician

Datuk Ahmad bin Ismail (born 1955), is a Malaysian politician and a member of the United Malays National Organisation (UMNO), serving as the chief of UMNO's Bukit Bendera (Penang Hill) division in the state of Penang.

Ahmad Ismail is known for controversial actions and remarks made in the fields of politics, business and sports, including the latest controversy in which he uttered incendiary remarks about the Chinese community during and after the Permatang Pauh by-election in August 2008, leading to his suspension by UMNO in September 2008.

== Political career ==
=== Accusations of racism ===
==== "Chinese as squatters" remark ====
In late August 2008, Ahmad Ismail was highlighted over racist remarks uttered during campaigning in a by-election in Permatang Pauh that primarily pitted Barisan Nasional candidate Arif Shah Omar Shah (UMNO) against Pakatan Rakyat candidate Anwar Ibrahim (PKR) for the Permatang Pauh parliamentary seat.

On 25 August 2008 local Chinese daily Sin Chew Daily reported a speech made by Ahmad Ismail on the evening of 23 August 2008 at Kampung Pelet to campaign for Arif Shah, in which he allegedly stated Malaysian Chinese were "immigrants" and "squatters", and could not have equal rights. In a 6 September statement by Prime Minister Abdullah Badawi, Ahmad was quoted that he merely uttered the remark based on historical facts and claimed it was not a racist statement as reported by Sin Chew Daily, accusing the paper of misinterpreting him.

Despite criticism of his remark in the by-election and expressing regret that it resulted in controversy, Ahmad remained defiant and refused to apologise. In a further outburst during a press conference on 8 September, Ahmad seditiously warned the Chinese community not to seek political power:

"The patience of the Malays and Muslims has a limit. Do not push us to the wall, as when we turn back we will be forced to push the Chinese in the interests of our own survival [...] The Chinese should not try to be like the Jews in America. It is not enough they control the economy, now they want political control."

Following a meeting with Prime Minister Abdullah Badawi on 9 September, Ahmad would later be quoted in stating Malays were "frustrated" and that Malay "dignity" was at stake, remaining convinced that he is more nationalistic defending the Malays rather than being racist:

"Half the Chinese say I'm a racist but most Malays say I'm a nationalist defending my race [...] What I see now is a rise of the Malay people, and I feel we should capitalise on the strength, the support we get from the Malay people... I know they are with me."

==== Reaction to His Comments ====
Revelations of Ahmad Ismail's comments during and after the by-election drew widespread criticism predominantly from the Chinese community. On 27 August, the youth wing of the Malaysian Chinese Association (MCA) demanded an apology from Ahmad, with secretary-general Wee Ka Siong stating Ahmad had angered the Chinese as well as other non-Malay communities; Wee had also received numerous complaints from the Chinese community in the past two days. On 9 September, Gerakan president Koh Tsu Koon announced Penang Gerakan has dissociated itself from UMNO's Penang branch, holding leaders of UMNO Penang accountable for failing to condemn Ahmad's conduct:

"We no longer want to be associated with Penang UMNO. We condemned the statement and irresponsible behaviour by Ahmad and his supporters. We are also extremely disappointed and saddened by the fact that many Penang UMNO leaders were present and condoned such irresponsible and insensitive statement and behaviour. He had twisted and turned a personal mistake into a conflict and crisis among BN component parties and the communities."

Views among members of UMNO were less conclusive. Following revelations of Ahmad's comments in the by-election, Prime Minister Abdullah Badawi stated party leaders expressed "regret and anger" over Ahmad Ismail's remark, as UMNO considered actions to be taken against Ahmad. Former Law Minister Mohamed Nazri Abdul Aziz voiced similar views that Ahmad Ismail should be held accountable for his remarks and issue an apology. In a 6 September report published by Utusan Malaysia, Muhammad Muhammad Taib reiterated Ahamd's defence, asking the public, especially politicians, not to put forward baseless accusations against Ahmad, claiming his remarks could merely be used in the context of history rather than politics.

==== Suspension from UMNO ====
In 2008, UMNO imposed a suspension on Ahmad for three years.

=== Reactions to His Suspension ===
However stronger action than had been expected in a bid to soothe growing anger from the Chinese community and among parties in Barisan Nasional ruling coalition. On 12 September 2008 Sin Chew Daily reporter Tan Hoon Cheng who reported the speech made by Ahmad Ismail, had been arrested under the Internal Security Act at 8.30pm at her home in Bukit Mertajam, Penang. The MCA, a component party of the Barisan National, has expressed shock that Ahmad Ismail, who made racist remarks has not been taken to task but reporter Tan Hoon Cheng, who wrote about the incident, has been arrested instead. "The perpetrator who vowed to conduct a nationwide roadshow on his remarks without any remorse is still at large," MCA vice-president Datuk Ong Tee Keat said.

== Business ==
In 1995, Peninsular Metroworks Sdn Bhd was founded with Ahmad Ismail as its executive chairman. The company was a special purpose vehicle, intended to receive concession to develop the Penang Outer Ring Road (PORR), a project which was subsequently delayed by the federal government in 2008 following the 2008 general election. Additionally, a majority stake in Peninsular Metroworks was indirectly linked to Ahmad Ismail: A 55% stake in the company was held in its early years by Nadi Senandung Sdn Bhd, which Ahmad was the director of; the remaining 45% was held by Setegap Bhd and Kumpulan Pinang Holdings Sdn Bhd, the latter a full subsidiary of Yayasan Bumiputra Pulau Pinang Bhd.

Ahmad Ismail was also the director of Popular Profile Sdn Bhd, which the Penang Development Corporation believed had wrongfully taken and kept RM500,000 from the state in a botched land transaction for Bukit Minyak in 1998, before winding up in 2005; Ahmad was believed to have cut links with the company in 1998. A police report was lodged by Penang Development Corporation on 3 September 2008.

Arowana Farm in Bukit Merah, Perak, is a business in which Ahmad is a major shareholder. He oversees the operation of the arowana breeding farm, which primarily exports fish to Mainland China.

== Sports ==
In addition to interests in politics and business, Ahmad Ismail was also the president of the Malaysian Sepak Takraw Association. During the 2007 Southeast Asian Games in Korat, Thailand, Ahmad led the pullout of Malaysia's sepak takraw team at the last minute.
