= Kasitah Gaddam =

Malaysian politician

Yang Berbahagia Tan Sri Datuk Kasitah Gaddam PSM JSM PGDK
- قصيدة بن قدم

Minister of Lands and Co-operatives Development
- In office 14 March 1999 – 26 March 2004
- Monarchs: Ja’afar; Salahuddin; Sirajuddin
- Prime Minister: Mahathir Mohamad; Abdullah Ahmad Badawi
- Deputy: Goh Cheng Teik (1999); Tan Kee Kwong (1999–2004)
- Preceded by: Osu Sukam
- Succeeded by: Adenan Satem (as Minister of Natural Resources and Environment); Mohamed Khaled Nordin (Co-operatives Development)
- Constituency: Senator

Member of the Malaysian Parliament for Kinabalu
- In office 1986–1990
- Preceded by: Mark Koding (BERJAYA-BN)
- Succeeded by: Osman Minudin (PBS)
- Majority: Uncontested (1986)

Personal details
- Born: Kasitah bin Gaddam; 18 October 1947 (age 78) Ranau, Ranau District, Crown Colony of North Borneo (now Sabah, Malaysia)
- Citizenship: Malaysian
- Party: United Sabah National Organisation (USNO); United Malay National Organisation (UMNO)
- Other political affiliations: Barisan Nasional (BN)
- Occupation: Politician

Tan Sri Datuk Kasitah bin Gaddam (Jawi: قصيدة بن قدم; born 18 October 1947) is a Malaysian politician from the United Malay National Organisation (UMNO) who served as Minister of Lands and Co-operatives Development of Malaysia between 1999 and 2004. He was born in Sabah, Malaysia.

== Corruption allegations ==
=== 2004 ===
Kasitah served as chairman of the Sabah State Land Development Authority (LKTNS). He was charged at the Kuala Lumpur Sessions Court on 12 February 2004 on two charges of corruption. Kasitah was accused of using his position as chairman of the LKTNS Board for personal interest by participating in the decision to approve the proposed sale of RM16.8 million worth of Sapi Plantations shares held by the board to Briskmark Enterprise Sdn Bhd. Kasitah was also accused of deceiving LKTNS by not revealing the offer of PPB Oil Palm Sdn Bhd to allocate five shares of the company for each Sapi Plantations share in the proposed public listing.

Brismark Enterprise Sdn Bhd director Wasli Mohamad Said was present at the Kota Kinabalu Sessions Court on 12 February 2004 to face five counts of corruption involving RM1 million and the granting of 3.36 million shares of LKTNS shares. Wasli, as the chief witness of the prosecution, revealed in court that former Chief Minister of Sabah and Sabah Progressive Party (SAPP) president Yong Teck Lee had instructed him to make a payment of more than RM5 million as a result of the sale of the shares owned by the Sabah state government to his agent of choice in 1996. The Anti-Corruption Agency (ACA) / Malaysian Anti-Corruption Commission (MACC) investigates the involvement of Yong. BPR director-general Said Hamdan denied Yong's allegations that the BPR's actions opened its investigative papers as a threat. According to him, the agency is a law enforcement body, hence, RBs conducts investigations without fear or favour.

Kasitah was accused of hiding information from members of the Sabah Land Development Board (SLDB) that the board on 22 October 1996 approved the sale of Sapi Plantations to Briskmark Enterprise Sdn Bhd, at a much lower price. As a result, the board lost over RM137.5 million in 1996. He himself chaired the board meeting at Hotel Fairlane in Kuala Lumpur, which was also its first board meeting outside Kota Kinabalu.

Prior to the sale of the shares to Briskmark, Kasitah initially obtained the approval of Sabah Chief Minister Joseph Kurup, the minister responsible for SLDB, where he had proposed two Bumiputera companies to buy the shares.

Kasitah was desperate to pay off his bank loan amounting to RM10.9 million from DCB Bank (now RHB Bank). Tahir was unchanged from the Yayasan Sabah and Kasitah worked with Wasli, the new SLDB general manager, to sell the shares to Briskmark and then to repay the loan with the bank.

On 12 August 2009, the Kuala Lumpur High Court dismissed and acquitted Kasitah from corruption and fraudulent involving shares belonging to the Sabah Land Development Authority (LKTNS) in 1996. Judge Suraya Othman said the prosecution failed to prove a prima facie case. Some individuals are still free despite having several police reports on their corrupt practices.

31 witnesses have been called to testify since 2007. Among the witnesses were former Minister of Resources and Enterprise Development, Joseph Kurup, and former Commerce International Merchant Bankers Bhd chief executive officer (CEO), Munir Majid.

Kasitah's lawyer was Muhammad Shafee Abdullah.

=== 2019 ===
In June 2019, Kasitah was amongst 41 entities alleged to have received misappropriated funds from 1Malaysia Development Berhad (1MDB) named in civil forfeiture suits filed by the Malaysian Anti-Corruption Commission (MACC). The amount he received was alleged to amount to RM154,757.52.

== Election results ==
Parliament of Malaysia
| Year | Constituency | Candidate | Votes | Pct | Opponent(s) | Votes | Pct | Ballots cast | Majority | Turnout |
|---|---|---|---|---|---|---|---|---|---|---|
| 1986 | P138 Kinabalu | Kasitah Gaddam (USNO) | Unopposed | | | | | | | |

== Honours ==
- Malaysia
  - Companion of the Order of Loyalty to the Crown of Malaysia (JSM) (1992)
  - Commander of the Order of Loyalty to the Crown of Malaysia (PSM) – Tan Sri (1996)
- Sabah
  - Commander of the Order of Kinabalu (PGDK) – Datuk (1988)

== See also ==
- Kinabalu (federal constituency)
