= Michael Chen Wing Sum =

Malaysian politician (1932–2024)

Yang Amat Berbahagia Tun Michael Chen Wing Sum SSM PSM DPMS PPM
- 曾永森

Ministerial roles
- 1964–1969: Parliamentary Secretary to the Deputy Prime Minister
- 1972–1974: Minister with Special Functions
- 1974–1976: Minister of Housing and New Villages
- 1976–1978: Minister of Housing and Villages Development
- 1978–1979: Minister of Housing and Local Government

Faction represented in Dewan Rakyat
- 1964–1969: Alliance Party
- 1972–1974: Alliance Party
- 1974–1982: Barisan Nasional

Personal details
- Born: Michael Chen Wing Sum; 26 June 1932 Chenderiang, Perak, Federated Malay States, British Malaya
- Died: 26 July 2024 (aged 92)
- Citizenship: Malaysian
- Party: Malaysian Chinese Association (MCA) (1960–1979, 1988–2024); Parti Gerakan Rakyat Malaysia (Gerakan) (1981–1988)
- Other political affiliations: Barisan Nasional
- Spouse: Helen Chen
- Children: 4
- Occupation: Politician

Michael Chen Wing Sum (Chinese: 曾永森; pinyin: Zēng Yǒngsēn; 26 June 1932 – 26 July 2024) was a Malaysian politician.

Across his political career, he had served as Housing, Local Government and New Village Minister as well as the Senate President.

== Life and career ==
Michael Chen joined the Malaysian Chinese Association (MCA) in 1960. He was elected MP for the Damansara constituency in Selangor in the 1964 general elections. He was subsequently appointed Parliamentary Secretary to the Deputy Prime Minister, Tun Abdul Razak Hussein in Tunku Abdul Rahman's third cabinet. However, Chen failed to retain his seat in the 1969 general elections. In 1972, Chen was elected MP of Ulu Selangor after the death of the incumbent MP Khaw Kai Boh. Chen was appointed Minister with Special Functions in Abdul Razak's first cabinet.

In 1977, Chen objected to an attempt to replace the Deputy President of MCA Lee Siok Yew with Chong Hon Nyan, and managed to defeat Chong for the position. He moved to challenge Lee San Choon for the MCA presidency itself in 1979, but was defeated. He did not challenge for the MCA presidency in 1981 as some who might have supported him had been expelled from the party; later he led a group of his supporters out of MCA to join the Gerakan.

He contested the 1982 election under the Gerakan's banner and won Beruas seat. He was a member of the parliament until 1986. From 1997 until 2003, he served in the Dewan Negara. He was deputy president from 1997 to 2000, and president from 2000 to 2003.

Michael Chen was married to Toh Puan Helen Chen. He died on 26 July 2024, at the age of 92.

== Election results ==
Parliament of Malaysia
| Year | Constituency | Candidate | Votes | Pct | Opponent(s) | Votes | Pct | Ballots cast | Majority | Turnout |
|---|---|---|---|---|---|---|---|---|---|---|
| 1964 | P073 Damansara | Michael Chen Wing Sum (MCA) | 9,148 | 43.68% | Tan Kai Hee (LPM) | 8,602 | 41.08% | 21,797 | 546 | 72.52% |
| 1964 | P073 Damansara | Michael Chen Wing Sum (MCA) | 9,148 | 43.68% | Lam Khuan Kit (PAP) | 3,191 | 15.24% | 21,797 | 546 | 72.52% |
| 1969 | P073 Damansara | Michael Chen Wing Sum (MCA) | 12,089 | 43.71% | Hor Cheok Foon (DAP) | 15,567 | 56.29% | 28,658 | 3,478 | 69.34% |
| 1972 | P078 Ulu Selangor | Michael Chen Wing Sum (MCA) | 11,052 | 67.02% | Lau Dak Kee (DAP) | 5,439 | 32.98% | 16,779 | 5,613 | 74.00% |
| 1974 | P075 Ulu Selangor | Michael Chen Wing Sum (MCA) | 15,323 | 75.14% | G. Davidson (DAP) | 5,070 | 24.86% | 21,680 | 10,253 | 80.83% |
| 1978 | P075 Ulu Selangor | Michael Chen Wing Sum (MCA) | 17,670 | 70.27% | Leong Ching Hoe (DAP) | 4,868 | 19.36% | 26,521 | 12,802 | 76.33% |
| 1978 | P075 Ulu Selangor | Michael Chen Wing Sum (MCA) | 17,670 | 70.27% | Yusof Ahmad (PAS) | 2,607 | 10.37% | 26,521 | 12,802 | 76.33% |
| 1982 | P056 Bruas | Michael Chen Wing Sum (Gerakan) | 14,922 | 63.08% | Quek Kow Sia (DAP) | 7,490 | 31.66% | 24,196 | 7,432 | 77.08% |
| 1982 | P056 Bruas | Michael Chen Wing Sum (Gerakan) | 14,922 | 63.08% | Yusoff Kassim (PAS) | 1,244 | 5.26% | 24,196 | 7,432 | 77.08% |

== Honours ==
=== Honours of Malaysia ===
- Malaysia
  - Grand Commander of the Order of Loyalty to the Crown of Malaysia (SSM) – Tun (2017)
  - Commander of the Order of Loyalty to the Crown of Malaysia (PSM) – Tan Sri (2002)
  - Recipient of the Malaysian Commemorative Medal (Silver) (PPM) (1965)
- Selangor
  - Knight Commander of the Order of the Crown of Selangor (DPMS) – Dato' (1977)
