= List of people who have served in both Houses of the Malaysian Parliament =

This is a list of members of the Malaysian Parliament who have served in both the Dewan Negara and the Dewan Rakyat during their federal parliamentary career.

Most people in the list represented different states in the Dewan Rakyat. Nobody has ever represented different states in the Dewan Negara, although various attempts have been made.

This list includes MPs who served in the past and who continue to serve in the present.

This is a list of members of the Malaysian Parliament who have served in both the Dewan Negara and the Dewan Rakyat during their federal parliamentary career.

Most people in the list represented different states in the Dewan Rakyat. Nobody has ever represented different states in the Dewan Negara, although various attempts have been made.

This list includes MPs who served in the past and who continue to serve in the present.

== List of people who have served in both houses ==
Party	Name	State	House	Constituency	Year elected	Year left	Reason	Highest office held	Refs
Alliance (MCA)	Lim Joo Kong	KED	DR	Elected by the State Assembly	1955	1957	Not Be Reappointed	MP	
BN (MCA)	Lim Joo Kong	KED	DN	Alor Star	1959	1964	Not Contested	MP	
Alliance (UMNO)	Mohamed Zahir Ismail	KED	DN	Elected by the State Assembly	1959	1964	Resigned	6th Speaker of the Dewan Rakyat	
Alliance (UMNO)	Mohamed Zahir Ismail	KED	DR	Sungei Patani	1964	1969	Defeated	6th Speaker of the Dewan Rakyat	
BN (UMNO)	Mohamed Zahir Ismail	At-large	DR	Elected by members of the Dewan Rakyat	1982	2004	Death in office	6th Speaker of the Dewan Rakyat	
Alliance (UMNO)	Mohamed Noah Omar	JOH	DR	Johore Bahru Timor	1959	1964	Not Contested	3rd President of the Dewan Negara	
Alliance (UMNO)	Mohamed Noah Omar	At-large	DN	Appointed by the Yang di-Pertuan Agong	1964	1970	Resigned	3rd President of the Dewan Negara	
Alliance (MCA)	Omar Ong Yoke Lin	SEL	DR	Ulu Selangor	1959	1964	Not Contested	5th President of the Dewan Negara	
BN (MCA)	Omar Ong Yoke Lin	At-large	DN	Appointed by the Yang di-Pertuan Agong	1964	1980	Not Be Reappointed	5th President of the Dewan Negara	
Alliance (UMNO)	Abdul Hamid Khan	PRK	DR	Batang Padang	1959	1969	Not Contested	4th President of the Dewan Negara	
BN (UMNO)	Abdul Hamid Khan	At-large	DN	Appointed by the Yang di-Pertuan Agong	1971	1977	Not Be Reappointed	4th President of the Dewan Negara	
Alliance (UMNO)	Bibi Aishah Hamid Don	At-large	DN	Appointed by the Yang di-Pertuan Agong	1964	1969	Resigned	MP	
Alliance (UMNO)	Bibi Aishah Hamid Don	KED	DR	Kulim Utara	1971	1974	Not Contested	MP	
Alliance (UMNO)	Abdul Ghafar Baba	At-large	DN	Appointed by the Yang di-Pertuan Agong	1968	1969	Resigned	6th Deputy Prime Minister of Malaysia	
Alliance (UMNO)	Abdul Ghafar Baba	MEL	DR	Malacca Utara	1971	1974	Transferred	6th Deputy Prime Minister of Malaysia	
BN (UMNO)	Abdul Ghafar Baba	MEL	DR	Alor Gajah	1974	1978	Transferred	6th Deputy Prime Minister of Malaysia	
BN (UMNO)	Abdul Ghafar Baba	MEL	DR	Jasin	1978	1999	Transferred	6th Deputy Prime Minister of Malaysia	
BN (UMNO)	Abdul Ghafar Baba	MEL	DR	Batu Berendam	1999	2004	Not Contested	6th Deputy Prime Minister of Malaysia	
Alliance (UMNO)	Muhammad Ghazali Shafie	At-large	DN	Appointed by the Yang di-Pertuan Agong	1971	1972	Resigned	Cabinet Minister	
BN (UMNO)	Muhammad Ghazali Shafie	PAH	DR	Lipis	1972	1986	Not Contested	Cabinet Minister	
Alliance (UMNO)	Mahathir Mohamad	KED	DR	Kota Star Selatan	1964	1969	Defeated	4th & 7th Prime Minister of Malaysia	
Alliance (UMNO)	Mahathir Mohamad	KED	DN	Elected by the State Assembly	1973	1974	Resigned	4th & 7th Prime Minister of Malaysia	
BN (UMNO)	Mahathir Mohamad	KED	DR	Kubang Pasu	1974	2004	Not Contested	4th & 7th Prime Minister of Malaysia	
PH (BERSATU)	Mahathir Mohamad	KED	DR	Langkawi	2018	2022	Defeated	4th & 7th Prime Minister of Malaysia	
PEJUANG	Mahathir Mohamad	KED	DR	Langkawi	2018	2022	Defeated	4th & 7th Prime Minister of Malaysia	
Alliance (UMNO)	Aishah Ghani	At-large	DN	Appointed by the Yang di-Pertuan Agong	1962	1974	Resigned	Cabinet Minister	
BN (UMNO)	Aishah Ghani	SEL	DR	Kuala Langat	1974	1986	Not Contested	Cabinet Minister	
Alliance (UMNO)	Abdul Kadir Yusuf	At-large	DN	Appointed by the Yang di-Pertuan Agong	1971	1974	Resigned	Cabinet Minister	
BN (UMNO)	Abdul Kadir Yusuf	JOH	DR	Tenggaroh	1974	1982	Not Contested	Cabinet Minister	
Alliance (MCA)	Lew Sip Hon	At-large	DN	Appointed by the Yang di-Pertuan Agong	1973	1974	Resigned	Deputy Minister	
BN (MCA)	Lew Sip Hon	SEL	DR	Shah Alam	1974	1986	Not Be Reappointed	Deputy Minister	
SCA	Yeh Pao Tzu	SAB	DR	Tawau	1971	1984	Not Contested	MP	
SCA	Yeh Pao Tzu	SAB	DN	Appointed by the Yang di-Pertuan Agong	1977	1980	Not Be Reappointed	MP	
BN (USNO)	Stephen R. Evans	SAB	DR	Keningau	1974	1977	Resigned	MP	
BN (USNO)	Stephen R. Evans	SAB	DN	Elected by the State Assembly	1977	1978	Resigned	MP	
BN (USNO)	Stephen R. Evans	SAB	DR	Keningau	1978	1982	Not Contested	MP	
Alliance (UMNO)	Syed Ahmad Syed Mahmud Shahabuddin	KED	DN	Elected by the State Assembly	1959	1965	Not Be Reappointed	5th Yang di-Pertua Negeri of Malacca	
BN (UMNO)	Syed Ahmad Syed Mahmud Shahabuddin	KED	DR	Padang Terap	1978	1984	Resigned	5th Yang di-Pertua Negeri of Malacca	
BN (UMNO)	Rafidah Aziz	At-large	DN	Appointed by the Yang di-Pertuan Agong	1975	1978	Resigned	Cabinet Minister	
BN (UMNO)	Rafidah Aziz	SEL	DR	Selayang	1978	1982	Transferred	Cabinet Minister	
BN (UMNO)	Rafidah Aziz	PRK	DR	Kuala Kangsar	1982	2013	Not Contested	Cabinet Minister	
BN (MIC)	Subramaniam Sinniah	KUL	DR	Damansara	1974	1978	Defeated	Deputy Minister	
BN (MIC)	Subramaniam Sinniah	At-large	DN	Appointed by the Yang di-Pertuan Agong	1979	1982	Resigned	Deputy Minister	
BN (MIC)	Subramaniam Sinniah	JOH	DR	Segamat	1982	2004	Not Contested	Deputy Minister	
BN (UMNO)	Mohamed Yaacob	KEL	DR	Tanah Merah	1971	1978	Not Contested	12th President of the Dewan Negara	
BN (UMNO)	Mohamed Yaacob	KEL	DR	Rantau Panjang	1986	1990	Not Contested	12th President of the Dewan Negara	
BN (UMNO)	Mohamed Yaacob	At-large	DN	Appointed by the Yang di-Pertuan Agong	1996	2000	Not Be Reappointed	12th President of the Dewan Negara	
BN (MCA)	Michael Chen Wing Sum	SEL	DR	Damansara	1964	1969	Defeated	13th President of the Dewan Negara	
BN (MCA)	Michael Chen Wing Sum	SEL	DR	Ulu Selangor	1972	1982	Transferred	13th President of the Dewan Negara	
BN (MCA)	Michael Chen Wing Sum	PRK	DR	Bruas	1982	1986	Not Contested	13th President of the Dewan Negara	
BN (MCA)	Michael Chen Wing Sum	At-large	DN	Appointed by the Yang di-Pertuan Agong	1997	2003	Not Be Reappointed	13th President of the Dewan Negara	
BN (SUPP)	Law Hieng Ding	At-large	DN	Appointed by the Yang di-Pertuan Agong	1979	1982	Not Be Reappointed	Cabinet Minister	
BN (SUPP)	Law Hieng Ding	SAR	DR	Sarikei	1982	2008	Not Contested	Cabinet Minister	
BN (UMNO)	Che Abdul Daim Zainuddin	At-large	DN	Appointed by the Yang di-Pertuan Agong	1980	1982	Resigned	Cabinet Minister	
BN (UMNO)	Che Abdul Daim Zainuddin	KED	DR	Kuala Muda	1982	1986	Transferred	Cabinet Minister	
BN (UMNO)	Che Abdul Daim Zainuddin	KED	DR	Merbok	1986	2004	Not Contested	Cabinet Minister	
BN (GERAKAN)	Lim Keng Yaik	At-large	DN	Appointed by the Yang di-Pertuan Agong	1972	1978	Resigned	Cabinet Minister	
BN (GERAKAN)	Lim Keng Yaik	PRK	DR	Beruas	1986	2008	Not Contested	Cabinet Minister	
BN (MIC)	D. P. Vijandran	At-large	DN	Appointed by the Yang di-Pertuan Agong	1982	1986	Resigned	8th Deputy Speaker of the Dewan Rakyat	
BN (MIC)	D. P. Vijandran	SEL	DR	Kapar	1986	1990	Not Contested	8th Deputy Speaker of the Dewan Rakyat	
BN (UMNO)	Abdul Ghani Othman	At-large	DN	Appointed by the Yang di-Pertuan Agong	1984	1986	Resigned	Cabinet Minister	
BN (UMNO)	Abdul Ghani Othman	JOH	DR	Ledang	1986	1995	Not Contested	Cabinet Minister	
BN (UMNO)	Rahmah Othman	SEL	DR	Selayang	1982	1986	Transferred	Deputy Minister	
BN (UMNO)	Rahmah Othman	SEL	DR	Shah Alam	1986	1990	Defeated	Deputy Minister	
BN (UMNO)	Rahmah Othman	At-large	DN	Appointed by the Yang di-Pertuan Agong	1994	1999	Resigned	Deputy Minister	
BN (UMNO)	Mohd Khalil Yaakob	PAH	DR	Maran	1982	1986	Not Contested	6th Yang di-Pertua Negeri of Malacca	
BN (UMNO)	Mohd Khalil Yaakob	At-large	DN	Appointed by the Yang di-Pertuan Agong	1999	1999	Resigned	6th Yang di-Pertua Negeri of Malacca	
BN (UMNO)	Mohd Khalil Yaakob	PAH	DR	Kuantan	1999	2004	Not Contested	6th Yang di-Pertua Negeri of Malacca	
BN (MIC)	K. S. Nijhar	At-large	DN	Appointed by the Yang di-Pertuan Agong	1985	1991	Not Be Reappointed	Parliamentary Secretary	
BN (MIC)	K. S. Nijhar	SEL	DR	Subang	1999	2008	Not Contested	Parliamentary Secretary	
BN (MIC)	M. G. Pandithan	PRK	DR	Tapah	1986	1990	Defeated	MP	
IPF	M. G. Pandithan	At-large	DN	Appointed by the Yang di-Pertuan Agong	1995	1998	Not Be Reappointed	MP	
BN (UMNO)	Ibrahim Ali	KEL	DR	Pasir Mas	1986	1995	Defeated	Deputy Minister	
BN (UMNO)	Ibrahim Ali	At-large	DN	Appointed by the Yang di-Pertuan Agong	1995	1999	Resigned	Deputy Minister	
PAS	Ibrahim Ali	KEL	DR	Pasir Mas	2008	2013	Defeated	Deputy Minister	
BN (MCA)	Tan Chai Ho	At-large	DN	Appointed by the Yang di-Pertuan Agong	1987	1990	Resigned	Deputy Minister	
BN (MCA)	Tan Chai Ho	KUL	DR	Bandar Tun Razak	1995	2008	Defeated	Deputy Minister	
BN (UMNO)	Annuar Musa	At-large	DN	Appointed by the Yang di-Pertuan Agong	1990	1995	Resigned	Cabinet Minister	
BN (UMNO)	Annuar Musa	KEL	DR	Peringat	1995	1999	Defeated	Cabinet Minister	
BN (UMNO)	Annuar Musa	KEL	DR	Ketereh	2013	2022	Not Contested	Cabinet Minister	
BN (UMNO)	Ahmad Zahid Hamidi	At-large	DN	Appointed by the Yang di-Pertuan Agong	1991	1994	Not Be Reappointed	11th & 14th Deputy Prime Minister of Malaysia	
BN (UMNO)	Ahmad Zahid Hamidi	PRK	DR	Bagan Datok	1995		Serving	11th & 14th Deputy Prime Minister of Malaysia	
BN (UMNO)	Mohamed Nazri Abdul Aziz	At-large	DN	Appointed by the Yang di-Pertuan Agong	1991	1994	Not Be Reappointed	Cabinet Minister	
BN (UMNO)	Mohamed Nazri Abdul Aziz	PRK	DR	Chenderoh	1995	2004	Transferred	Cabinet Minister	
BN (UMNO)	Mohamed Nazri Abdul Aziz	PRK	DR	Padang Rengas	2004	2022	Not Contested	Cabinet Minister	
BN (UMNO)	Mustapa Mohamed	At-large	DN	Appointed by the Yang di-Pertuan Agong	1991	1995	Resigned	Cabinet Minister	
BN (UMNO)	Mustapa Mohamed	KEL	DR	Jeli	1995	1999	Defeated	Cabinet Minister	
BN (UMNO)	Mustapa Mohamed	KEL	DR	Jeli	2004	2022	Not Contested	Cabinet Minister	
BN (SUPP)	Tiong Thai King	At-large	DN	Appointed by the Yang di-Pertuan Agong	1991	1994	Not Be Reappointed	MP	
BN (SUPP)	Tiong Thai King	SAR	DR	Lanang	1995	2013	Defeated	MP	
BN (USNO)	Kasitah Gaddam	SAB	DR	Kinabalu	1986	1990	Not Contested	Cabinet Minister	
BN (UMNO)	Kasitah Gaddam	At-large	DN	Appointed by the Yang di-Pertuan Agong	1999	2005	Not Be Reappointed	Cabinet Minister	
BN (UMNO)	Abdul Hamid Othman	KED	DR	Sik	1990	1999	Defeated	Cabinet Minister	
BN (UMNO)	Abdul Hamid Othman	At-large	DN	Appointed by the Yang di-Pertuan Agong	1999	2002	Not Be Reappointed	Cabinet Minister	
BN (MCA)	Ng Yen Yen	PAH	DN	Elected by the State Assembly	1993	1996	Not Be Reappointed	Cabinet Minister	
BN (MCA)	Ng Yen Yen	PAH	DR	Raub	1999	2013	Not Contested	Cabinet Minister	
BN (UMNO)	Mastika Junaidah Husin	At-large	DN	Appointed by the Yang di-Pertuan Agong	1994	1999	Resigned	Parliamentary Secretary	
BN (UMNO)	Mastika Junaidah Husin	PER	DR	Arau	1999	2004	Not Contested	Parliamentary Secretary	
BN (UMNO)	Abdul Hamid Pawanteh	PER	DR	Arau	1982	1986	Not Contested	14th President of the Dewan Negara	
BN (UMNO)	Abdul Hamid Pawanteh	PER	DR	Kangar	1999	2003	Resigned	14th President of the Dewan Negara	
BN (UMNO)	Abdul Hamid Pawanteh	At-large	DN	Appointed by the Yang di-Pertuan Agong	2003	2009	Not Be Reappointed	14th President of the Dewan Negara	
PAS	Kalthom Othman	KEL	DN	Elected by the State Assembly	1991	1997	Not Be Reappointed	MP	
PAS	Kalthom Othman	KEL	DR	Pasir Puteh	2004	2004	Not Contested	MP	
BN (MCA)	Tan Ah Eng	JOH	DN	Elected by the State Assembly	1997	2000	Not Be Reappointed	MP	
BN (MCA)	Tan Ah Eng	JOH	DR	Gelang Patah	2004	2013	Not Contested	MP	
BN (UMNO)	Zainuddin Maidin	At-large	DN	Appointed by the Yang di-Pertuan Agong	1998	2004	Not Be Reappointed	Cabinet Minister	
BN (UMNO)	Zainuddin Maidin	KED	DR	Merbok	2004	2008	Defeated	Cabinet Minister	
BN (UMNO)	Abdul Aziz Shamsuddin	At-large	DN	Appointed by the Yang di-Pertuan Agong	1999	2002	Not Be Reappointed	Cabinet Minister	
BN (UMNO)	Abdul Aziz Shamsuddin	SEL	DR	Shah Alam	2004	2008	Defeated	Cabinet Minister	
BN (UMNO)	Tengku Adnan Tengku Mansor	At-large	DN	Appointed by the Yang di-Pertuan Agong	2000	2003	Not Be Reappointed	Cabinet Minister	
BN (UMNO)	Tengku Adnan Tengku Mansor	PUT	DR	Putrajaya	2004	2022	Defeated	Cabinet Minister	
BN (UMNO)	Azizah Mohd Dun	At-large	DN	Appointed by the Yang di-Pertuan Agong	2000	2004	Resigned	Deputy Minister	
BN (UMNO)	Azizah Mohd Dun	SAB	DR	Beaufort	2004	2008	Not Contested	Deputy Minister	
BN (UMNO)	Azizah Mohd Dun	SAB	DR	Beaufort	2013	2022	Not Contested	Deputy Minister	
BN (PPP)	M. Kayveas	At-large	DN	Appointed by the Yang di-Pertuan Agong	2000	2003	Not Be Reappointed	Deputy Minister	
BN (PPP)	M. Kayveas	PRK	DR	Taiping	2004	2008	Defeated	Deputy Minister	
BN (UMNO)	Abdul Hamid Zainal Abidin	At-large	DN	Appointed by the Yang di-Pertuan Agong	2001	2004	Not Be Reappointed	Cabinet Minister	
BN (UMNO)	Abdul Hamid Zainal Abidin	PRK	DR	Parit Buntar	2004	2008	Not Contested	Cabinet Minister	
BN (PBB)	Mohd Effendi Norwawi	SAR	DR	Kuala Rajang	1999	2004	Not Contested	Cabinet Minister	
BN (PBB)	Mohd Effendi Norwawi	At-large	DN	Appointed by the Yang di-Pertuan Agong	2006	2012	Not Be Reappointed	Cabinet Minister	
PAS	Siti Zailah Mohd Yusoff	KEL	DN	Elected by the State Assembly	2000	2006	Not Be Reappointed	MP	
PAS	Siti Zailah Mohd Yusoff	KEL	DR	Rantau Panjang	2008		Serving	MP	
PN (PAS)	Siti Zailah Mohd Yusoff	KEL	DR	Rantau Panjang	2008		Serving	MP	
BN (UMNO)	Hamzah Zainudin	PRK	DN	Elected by the State Assembly	2000	2006	Not Be Reappointed	Cabinet Minister	
BN (UMNO)	Hamzah Zainudin	PRK	DR	Larut	2008		Serving	Cabinet Minister	
PH (BERSATU)	Hamzah Zainudin	PRK	DR	Larut	2008		Serving	Cabinet Minister	
PN (BERSATU)	Hamzah Zainudin	PRK	DR	Larut	2008		Serving	Cabinet Minister	
BN (MIC)	Saravanan Murugan	At-large	DN	Appointed by the Yang di-Pertuan Agong	2000	2003	Not Be Reappointed	Deputy Minister	
BN (MIC)	Saravanan Murugan	PRK	DR	Tapah	2008		Serving	Deputy Minister	
BN (UMNO)	Nor Mohamed Yakcop	At-large	DN	Appointed by the Yang di-Pertuan Agong	2004	2008	Resigned	Cabinet Minister	
BN (UMNO)	Nor Mohamed Yakcop	PEN	DR	Tasek Gelugor	2008	2013	Not Contested	Cabinet Minister	
BN (UMNO)	Mohd Puad Zarkashi	JOH	DN	Elected by the State Assembly	2004	2007	Not Be Reappointed	Deputy Minister	
BN (UMNO)	Mohd Puad Zarkashi	JOH	DR	Batu Pahat	2008	2013	Defeated	Deputy Minister	
BN (UMNO)	Ismail Kassim	PER	DN	Elected by the State Assembly	2006	2008	Resigned	MP	
BN (UMNO)	Ismail Kassim	PER	DR	Arau	2008	2013	Not Contested	MP	
BN (UMNO)	Mashitah Ibrahim	KED	DR	Baling	2004	2008	Not Contested	Deputy Minister	
BN (UMNO)	Mashitah Ibrahim	At-large	DN	Appointed by the Yang di-Pertuan Agong	2008	2014	Not Be Reappointed	Deputy Minister	
BN (UMNO)	Zaid Ibrahim	KEL	DR	Kota Bharu	2004	2008	Not Contested	Cabinet Minister	
BN (UMNO)	Zaid Ibrahim	At-large	DN	Appointed by the Yang di-Pertuan Agong	2008	2008	Resigned	Cabinet Minister	
BN (UMNO)	Pandikar Amin Mulia	SAB	DN	Elected by the State Assembly	1988	1991	Not Be Reappointed	8th Speaker of the Dewan Rakyat	
BN (UMNO)	Pandikar Amin Mulia	At-large	DN	Appointed by the Yang di-Pertuan Agong	1999	2002	Not Be Reappointed	8th Speaker of the Dewan Rakyat	
BN (UMNO)	Pandikar Amin Mulia	At-large	DR	Elected by members of the Dewan Rakyat	2008	2018	Resigned	8th Speaker of the Dewan Rakyat	
BN (GERAKAN)	Koh Tsu Koon	PEN	DR	Tanjong	1982	1986	Defeated	Cabinet Minister	
BN (GERAKAN)	Koh Tsu Koon	At-large	DR	Appointed by the Yang di-Pertuan Agong	2009	2015	Not Be Reappointed	Cabinet Minister	
BN (UMNO)	Shahrizat Abdul Jalil	KUL	DR	Lembah Pantai	1995	2008	Defeated	Cabinet Minister	
BN (UMNO)	Shahrizat Abdul Jalil	At-large	DN	Appointed by the Yang di-Pertuan Agong	2009	2012	Not Be Reappointed	Cabinet Minister	
BN (MCA)	Chew Mei Fun	SEL	DR	Petaling Jaya Utara	1999	2008	Defeated	Deputy Minister	
BN (MCA)	Chew Mei Fun	At-large	DN	Appointed by the Yang di-Pertuan Agong	2009	2012	Not Be Reappointed	Deputy Minister	
BN (MCA)	Chew Mei Fun	At-large	DN	Appointed by the Yang di-Pertuan Agong	2014	2017	Not Be Reappointed	Deputy Minister	
BN (UMNO)	Awang Adek Hussin	KEL	DR	Bachok	2004	2008	Defeated	Deputy Minister	
BN (UMNO)	Awang Adek Hussin	At-large	DN	Appointed by the Yang di-Pertuan Agong	2009	2015	Not Be Reappointed	Deputy Minister	
BN (MIC)	Palanivel Govindasamy	SEL	DR	Hulu Selangor	1990	2008	Defeated	Cabinet Minister	
BN (MIC)	Palanivel Govindasamy	At-large	DN	Appointed by the Yang di-Pertuan Agong	2010	2013	Resigned	Cabinet Minister	
BN (MIC)	Palanivel Govindasamy	PAH	DR	Cameron Highlands	2013	2018	Not Contested	Cabinet Minister	
BN (UMNO)	Abu Zahar Ujang	NSE	DR	Kuala Pilah	1995	1999	Not Contested	16th President of the Dewan Negara	
BN (UMNO)	Abu Zahar Ujang	At-large	DN	Appointed by the Yang di-Pertuan Agong	2010	2016	Not Be Reappointed	16th President of the Dewan Negara	
BN (UMNO)	Jamil Khir Baharom	At-large	DN	Appointed by the Yang di-Pertuan Agong	2009	2013	Resigned	Cabinet Minister	
BN (UMNO)	Jamil Khir Baharom	KED	DR	Jerai	2013	2018	Defeated	Cabinet Minister	
BN (MCA)	Khoo Soo Seang	JOH	DN	Elected by the State Assembly	2010	2013	Resigned	MP	
BN (MCA)	Khoo Soo Seang	JOH	DR	Tebrau	2013	2018	Not Contested	MP	
BN (UMNO)	Mohd Ali Mohd Rustam	MEL	DR	Batu Berendam	1995	1999	Not Contested	7th Yang di-Pertua Negeri of Malacca	
BN (UMNO)	Mohd Ali Mohd Rustam	MEL	DN	Elected by the State Assembly	2013	2016	Not Be Reappointed	7th Yang di-Pertua Negeri of Malacca	
BN (MCA)	Lee Chee Leong	PRK	DR	Kampar	2008	2013	Defeated	Deputy Minister	
BN (MCA)	Lee Chee Leong	PRK	DN	Elected by the State Assembly	2014	2018	Resigned	Deputy Minister	
BN (MCA)	Hou Kok Chung	JOH	DR	Kluang	2008	2013	Defeated	Deputy Minister	
BN (MCA)	Hou Kok Chung	At-large	DN	Appointed by the Yang di-Pertuan Agong	2014	2018	Resigned	Deputy Minister	
BN (MIC)	Vigneswaran Sanasee	SEL	DR	Kota Raja	2004	2008	Defeated	17th President of the Dewan Negara	
BN (MIC)	Vigneswaran Sanasee	At-large	DN	Appointed by the Yang di-Pertuan Agong	2014	2020	Not Be Reappointed	17th President of the Dewan Negara	
BN (UMNO)	Salleh Said Keruak	SAB	DR	Kota Belud	1995	2008	Not Contested	Cabinet Minister	
BN (UMNO)	Salleh Said Keruak	At-large	DN	Appointed by the Yang di-Pertuan Agong	2015	2018	Not Be Reappointed	Cabinet Minister	
BN (MIC)	Devamany Krishnasamy	PAH	DR	Cameron Highlands	2004	2013	Defeated	Deputy Minister	
BN (MIC)	Devamany Krishnasamy	At-large	DN	Appointed by the Yang di-Pertuan Agong	2016	2018	Resigned	Deputy Minister	
PAS	Muhamad Mustafa	KEL	DR	Peringat	1999	2004	Defeated	MP	
PAS	Muhamad Mustafa	KEL	DN	Elected by the State Assembly	2017	2020	Not Be Reappointed	MP	
BN (PBS)	Jeffrey Kitingan	At-large	DN	Appointed by the Yang di-Pertuan Agong	1994	1997	Not Be Reappointed	Deputy Minister	
STAR	Jeffrey Kitingan	SAB	DR	Keningau	2018		Serving	Deputy Minister	
BN (UMNO)	Mohd Salim Mohd Sharif	NSE	DN	Elected by the State Assembly	2014	2018	Resigned	MP	
BN (UMNO)	Mohd Salim Mohd Sharif	NSE	DR	Jempol	2018	2022	Not Contested	MP	
DAP	Liew Chin Tong	PEN	DR	Bukit Bendera	2008	2013	Transferred	Deputy Minister	
DAP	Liew Chin Tong	JOH	DR	Kluang	2013	2018	Defeated	Deputy Minister	
PH (DAP)	Liew Chin Tong	At-large	DN	Appointed by the Yang di-Pertuan Agong	2018	2021	Not Be Reappointed	Deputy Minister	
PH (DAP)	Liew Chin Tong	JOH	DR	Iskandar Puteri	2022		Serving	Deputy Minister	
PAS	Raja Kamarul Bahrin Shah Raja Ahmad Baharuddin Shah	TRG	DR	Kuala Terengganu	2013	2018	Defeated	Deputy Minister	
AMANAH	Raja Kamarul Bahrin Shah Raja Ahmad Baharuddin Shah	TRG	DR	Kuala Terengganu	2013	2018	Defeated	Deputy Minister	
PH (AMANAH)	Raja Kamarul Bahrin Shah Raja Ahmad Baharuddin Shah	At-large	DN	Appointed by the Yang di-Pertuan Agong	2018	2021	Not Be Reappointed	Deputy Minister	
PKR	Mohd Yusmadi Mohd Yusoff	PEN	DR	Balik Pulau	2008	2013	Not Contested	MP	
PH (PKR)	Mohd Yusmadi Mohd Yusoff	PEN	DN	Elected by the State Assembly	2018	2021	Not Be Reappointed	MP	
PKR	Mohamad Imran Abdul Hamid	PRK	DR	Lumut	2013	2018	Not Contested	MP	
PH (PKR)	Mohamad Imran Abdul Hamid	At-large	DN	Appointed by the Yang di-Pertuan Agong	2018	2021	Not Be Reappointed	MP	
PAS	Husam Musa	KEL	DR	Kubang Kerian	1999	2004	Not Contested	MP	
PH (AMANAH)	Husam Musa	At-large	DN	Appointed by the Yang di-Pertuan Agong	2018	2021	Not Be Reappointed	MP	
BN (UPKO)	Donald Peter Mojuntin	SAB	DR	Penampang	2004	2008	Not Contested	MP	
UPKO	Donald Peter Mojuntin	SAB	DN	Elected by the State Assembly	2018	2021	Not Be Reappointed	MP	
BN (UMNO)	Rais Yatim	NSE	DR	Jelebu	1974	1990	Defected	18th President of the Dewan Negara	
BN (UMNO)	Rais Yatim	NSE	DR	Jelebu	1999	2013	Not Contested	18th President of the Dewan Negara	
PN (BERSATU)	Rais Yatim	At-large	DN	Appointed by the Yang di-Pertuan Agong	2020	2023	Not Be Reappointed	18th President of the Dewan Negara	
BN (UMNO)	Mohd Radzi Sheikh Ahmad	PER	DR	Kangar	1982	1990	Defected	Cabinet Minister	
BN (UMNO)	Mohd Radzi Sheikh Ahmad	PER	DR	Kangar	2004	2013	Not Contested	Cabinet Minister	
PN (BERSATU)	Mohd Radzi Sheikh Ahmad	At-large	DN	Appointed by the Yang di-Pertuan Agong	2020	2022	Resigned	Cabinet Minister	
PAS	Idris Ahmad	PRK	DR	Bukit Gantang	2013	2018	Defeated	Cabinet Minister	
PAS	Idris Ahmad	At-large	DN	Appointed by the Yang di-Pertuan Agong	2020	2022	Resigned	Cabinet Minister	
PN (PAS)	Idris Ahmad	PRK	DR	Bagan Serai	2022		Serving	Cabinet Minister	
PAS	Mohd Apandi Mohamad	KEL	DR	Jeli	1990	1995	Defeated	MP	
PN (PAS)	Mohd Apandi Mohamad	KEL	DN	Elected by the State Assembly	2020	2023	Not Be Reappointed	MP	
BN (UMNO)	Othman Aziz	KED	DR	Jerlun	2013	2018	Defeated	Deputy Minister	
BN (UMNO)	Othman Aziz	KED	DN	Elected by the State Assembly	2020	2022	Resigned	Deputy Minister	
BN (MCA)	Koh Nai Kwong	MEL	DR	Alor Gajah	2013	2018	Not Contested	MP	
BN (MCA)	Koh Nai Kwong	MEL	DN	Elected by the State Assembly	2021		Serving	MP	
PAS	Mumtaz Md Nawi	KEL	DN	Elected by the State Assembly	2009	2012	Not Be Reappointed	MP	
PN (PAS)	Mumtaz Md Nawi	KEL	DR	Tumpat	2022		Serving	MP	
BN (PRS)	Doris Sophia Brodi	At-large	DN	Appointed by the Yang di-Pertuan Agong	2010	2016	Not Be Reappointed	12th Deputy President of the Dewan Negara	
GPS (PRS)	Doris Sophia Brodi	SAR	DR	Sri Aman	2022		Serving	12th Deputy President of the Dewan Negara	
BN (UMNO)	Mohd Suhaimi Abdullah	KED	DR	Elected by the State Assembly	2014	2020	Not Be Reappointed	MP	
PH (BERSATU)	Mohd Suhaimi Abdullah	KED	DR	Elected by the State Assembly	2014	2020	Not Be Reappointed	MP	
PN (BERSATU)	Mohd Suhaimi Abdullah	KED	DN	Langkawi	2022		Serving	MP	
PN (BERSATU)	Mohd Radzi Md Jidin	At-large	DN	Appointed by the Yang di-Pertuan Agong	2018	2022	Resigned	Cabinet Senior Minister	
PN (BERSATU)	Mohd Radzi Md Jidin	PUT	DR	Putrajaya	2022		Serving	Cabinet Senior Minister	
PH (AMANAH)	Aiman Athirah Sabu	KUL	DN	Appointed by the Yang di-Pertuan Agong	2018	2020	Not Be Reappointed	Deputy Minister	
PH (AMANAH)	Aiman Athirah Sabu	SEL	DR	Sepang	2022		Serving	Deputy Minister	
PH (DAP)	Lim Hui Ying	PEN	DN	Elected by the State Assembly	2018	2022	Resigned	Deputy Minister	
PH (DAP)	Lim Hui Ying	PEN	DR	Tanjong	2022		Serving	Deputy Minister	
PN (BERSATU)	Wan Ahmad Fayhsal Wan Ahmad Kamal	At-large	DN	Appointed by the Yang di-Pertuan Agong	2020	2022	Resigned	Deputy Minister	
PN (BERSATU)	Wan Ahmad Fayhsal Wan Ahmad Kamal	KEL	DR	Machang	2022		Serving	Deputy Minister	
PN (PAS)	Ahmad Yahaya	KED	DN	Elected by the State Assembly	2020	2022	Resigned	MP	
PN (PAS)	Ahmad Yahaya	KED	DR	Pokok Sena	2022		Serving	MP	
PN (PAS)	Khairil Nizam Khirudin	At-large	DN	Appointed by the Yang di-Pertuan Agong	2020	2022	Resigned	MP	
PN (PAS)	Khairil Nizam Khirudin	PAH	DR	Jerantut	2022		Serving	MP	
PH (PKR)	Fadhlina Sidek	PEN	DN	Elected by the State Assembly	2021	2022	Resigned	Cabinet Minister	
PH (PKR)	Fadhlina Sidek	PEN	DR	Nibong Tebal	2022		Serving	Cabinet Minister	
PN (BERSATU)	Iskandar Dzulkarnain Abdul Khalid	PRK	DN	Elected by the State Assembly	2021	2022	Resigned	MP	
PN (BERSATU)	Iskandar Dzulkarnain Abdul Khalid	PRK	DR	Kuala Kangsar	2022		Serving	MP	
PKR	Saifuddin Nasution Ismail	KEL	DR	Machang	2008	2013	Defeated	Cabinet Minister	
PH (PKR)	Saifuddin Nasution Ismail	KDH	DR	Kulim-Bandar Baharu	2018	2022	Defeated	Cabinet Minister	
PH (PKR)	Saifuddin Nasution Ismail	At-large	DN	Appointed by the Yang di-Pertuan Agong	2022		Serving	Cabinet Minister	
PKR	Fuziah Salleh	PAH	DR	Kuantan	2008	2022	Defeated	Deputy Minister	
PH (PKR)	Fuziah Salleh	At-large	DB	Appointed by the Yang di-Pertuan Agong	2022		Serving	Deputy Minister	
BN (UMNO)	Anifah Aman	SAB	DR	Beaufort	1999	2004	Transferred	Cabinet Minister	
BN (UMNO)	Anifah Aman	SAB	DR	Kimanis	2004	2020	Not Contested	Cabinet Minister	
GRS (PCS)	Anifah Aman	LAB	DN	Appointed by the Yang di-Pertuan Agong	2023	2026	Not Be Reappointed	Cabinet Minister	
PAS	Mohd Hatta Ramli	KEL	DR	Kuala Krai	2008	2018	Transferred	Deputy Minister	
AMANAH	Mohd Hatta Ramli	KEL	DR	Kuala Krai	2008	2018	Transferred	Deputy Minister	
PH (AMANAH)	Mohd Hatta Ramli	PRK	DR	Lumut	2018	2022	Defeated	Deputy Minister	
PH (AMANAH)	Mohd Hatta Ramli	At-large	DN	Appointed by the Yang di-Pertuan Agong	2023		Serving	Deputy Minister	
PH (DAP)	Noorita Sual	SAB	DN	Tenom	2018	2022	Defeated	MP	
PH (DAP)	Noorita Sual	At-large	DR	Appointed by the Yang di-Pertuan Agong	2023		Serving	MP	
BN (MIC)	Sivaraj Chandran	PAH	DR	Cameron Highlands	2018	2018	Not Contested	MP	
BN (MIC)	Sivaraj Chandran	At-large	DN	Appointed by the Yang di-Pertuan Agong	2023	2026	Not Be Reappointed	MP	
PAS	Mujahid Yusof Rawa	PRK	DR	Parit Buntar	2008	2022	Defeated	Cabinet Minister	
AMANAH	Mujahid Yusof Rawa	PRK	DR	Parit Buntar	2008	2022	Defeated	Cabinet Minister	
PH (AMANAH)	Mujahid Yusof Rawa	PRK	DN	Elected by the State Assembly	2023	2026	Not Be Reappointed	Cabinet Minister	
BN (PBB)	Wan Junaidi Tuanku Jaafar	SAR	DR	Batang Lupar	1990	1999	Transferred	8th Yang di-Pertua Negeri of Sarawak	
BN (PBB)	Wan Junaidi Tuanku Jaafar	SAR	DR	Santubong	1999	2022	Not Contested	8th Yang di-Pertua Negeri of Sarawak	
GPS (PBB)	Wan Junaidi Tuanku Jaafar	At-large	DN	Appointed by the Yang di-Pertuan Agong	2023	2024	Resigned	8th Yang di-Pertua Negeri of Sarawak	
BN (UMNO)	Nur Jazlan Mohamed	JOH	DR	Pulai	2004	2018	Defeated	15th Deputy President of the Dewan Negara	
BN (UMNO)	Nur Jazlan Mohamed	At-large	DN	Appointed by the Yang di-Pertuan Agong	2023		Serving	15th Deputy President of the Dewan Negara	
PAS	Nik Mohamad Abduh Nik Abdul Aziz	KEL	DR	Pasir Mas	2013	2018	Transferred	MP	
PAS	Nik Mohamad Abduh Nik Abdul Aziz	KEL	DR	Bachok	2018	2022	Not Contested	MP	
PN (PAS)	Nik Mohamad Abduh Nik Abdul Aziz	KEL	DN	Elected by the State Assembly	2023		Serving	MP	
BN (PBB)	Mutang Tagal	At-large	DR	Bukit Mas	1982	1990	Not Contested	20th President of the Dewan Negara	
GPS (PBB)	Mutang Tagal	At-large	DN	Appointed by the Yang di-Pertuan Agong	2024	2024	Death in office	20th President of the Dewan Negara	
PAS	Che Alias Hamid	TRG	DR	Kemaman	2018	2023	Disqualified	MP	
PN (PAS)	Che Alias Hamid	TRG	DN	Elected by the State Assembly	2024		Serving	MP	
