= Minister of Rural and Regional Development (Malaysia) =

Ministry of the Government of Malaysia

- Kementerian Kemajuan Desa dan Wilayah

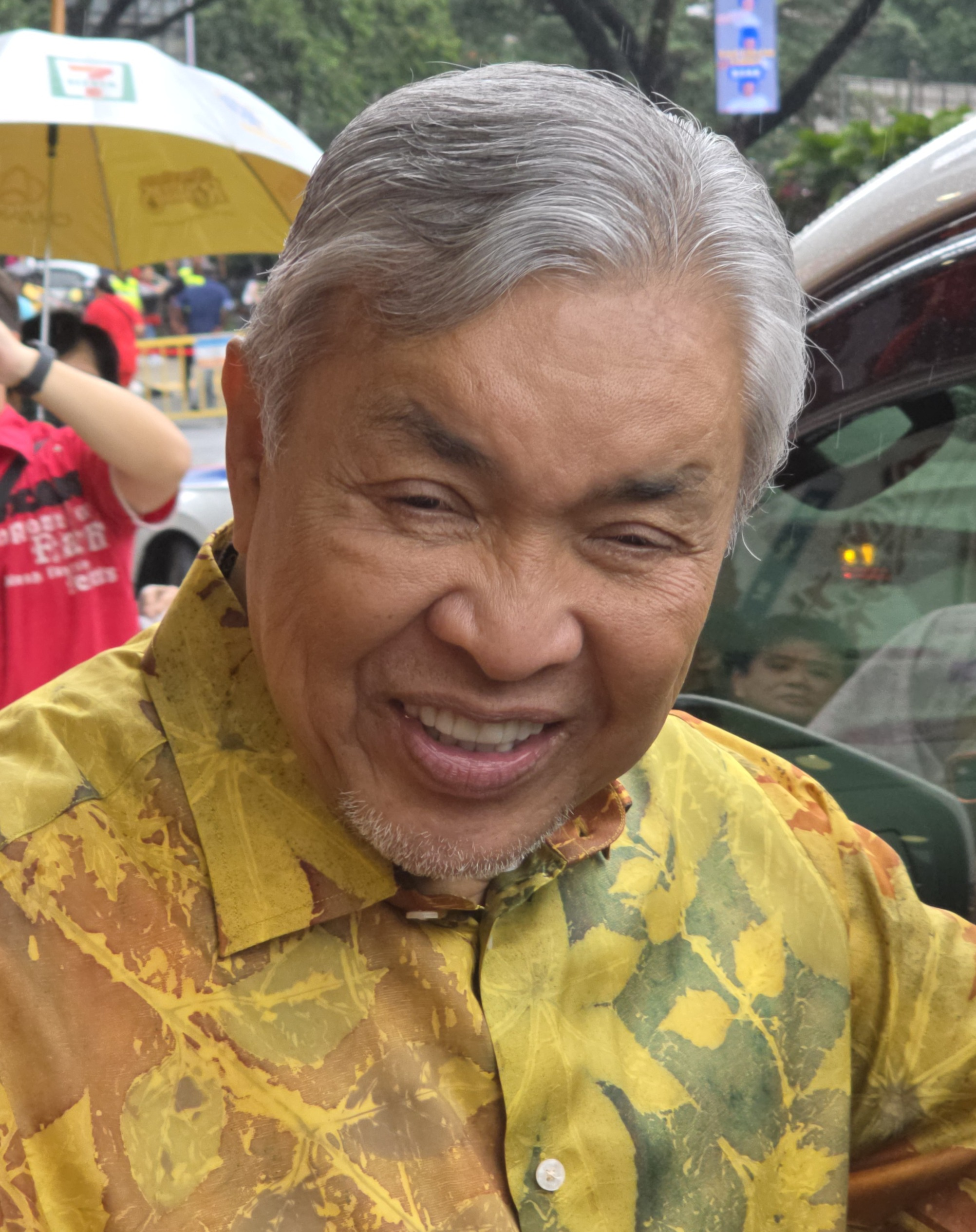
- Incumbent; Ahmad Zahid Hamidi since 3 December 2022
- Ministry of Rural and Regional Development
- Style: Yang Amat Berhormat Menteri (The Most Honourable Minister)
- Abbreviation: KKDW
- Member of: Cabinet of Malaysia
- Reports to: Parliament of Malaysia
- Seat: Putrajaya
- Appointer: Yang di-Pertuan Agong on the recommendation of the Prime Minister of Malaysia
- Formation: 1957
- First holder: Abdul Razak Hussein (Minister of National and Rural Development)
- Deputy: Rubiah Wang
- Website: www.rurallink.gov.my

The Minister of Rural and Regional Development has been Ahmad Zahid Hamidi since 3 December 2022. The minister is supported by Deputy Minister of Rural and Regional Development, Rubiah Wang since 3 December 2022. The minister administers the portfolio through the Ministry of Rural and Regional Development.

== List of ministers ==
=== Rural development ===
The following individuals have been appointed as Minister of Rural Development, or any of its precedent titles:

Political party: Alliance/BN PH PN

Portrait	Name (Birth–Death) Constituency	Political party	Title	Took office	Left office	Deputy Minister	Prime Minister (Cabinet)
	Abdul Razak Hussein (1922–1976); MP for Semantan (1957-1959); MP for Pekan (1959-1970)	Alliance (UMNO)	Minister of National and Rural Development	31 August 1957	22 September 1970	Vacant	Tunku Abdul Rahman (I • II • III • IV)
	Abdul Ghafar Baba (1925–2006); MP for Malacca Utara	Alliance (UMNO)	Minister of National and Rural Development	1970	1973	Vacant	Abdul Razak Hussein (I)
	Abdul Ghafar Baba (1925–2006); MP for Malacca Utara	BN (UMNO)	Minister of Rural Economy Development	1973	1974	Vacant	Abdul Razak Hussein (I)
	Abdul Ghafar Baba (1925–2006); MP for Malacca Utara	BN (UMNO)	Minister of Agriculture and Rural Development	1974	1976	Vacant	Abdul Razak Hussein (II)
	Ali Ahmad (1930–1977); MP for Pontian	BN (UMNO)	Minister of Agriculture and Rural Development	1976	1977	Mustapha Abdul Jabar	Hussein Onn (I)
	Sanusi Junid (1943–2018); MP for Jerlun-Langkawi	BN (UMNO)	Minister of National and Rural Development	16 July 1981	10 August 1986	Vacant (1981–1984); Mohammad Yahya Lampong (1984–1985); Abdillah Abdul Hamid (1984–1985)	Mahathir Mohamad (I • II)
	Abdul Ghafar Baba (1925–2006) (Deputy Prime Minister); MP for Jasin	BN (UMNO)	Minister of National and Rural Development	11 August 1986	26 October 1990	Tajol Rosli Mohd Ghazali (1986–1990); Ng Cheng Kuai (1984–1989)	Mahathir Mohamad (III)
	Abdul Ghafar Baba (1925–2006) (Deputy Prime Minister); MP for Jasin	BN (UMNO)	Minister of Rural Development	27 October 1990	15 October 1993	Mohd. Yasin Kamari	Mahathir Mohamad (IV)
	Annuar Musa (b. 1956); Senator (1990-1995); MP for Peringat (1995-1999)	BN (UMNO)	Minister of Rural Development	1 December 1993	14 December 1999	Mohd. Yasin Kamari (1993–1995); K Kumaran (1985–1999)	Mahathir Mohamad (IV • V)
	Azmi Khalid (b. 1940); MP for Padang Besar	BN (UMNO)	Minister of Rural Development	15 December 1999	26 March 2004	Palanivel Govindasamy	Mahathir Mohamad (VI); Abdullah Ahmad Badawi (I)
	Abdul Aziz Shamsuddin (1938–2020); MP for Shah Alam	BN (UMNO)	Minister of Rural and Regional Development	27 March 2004	18 March 2008	Awang Adek Hussin (2004–2006); Tiki Lafe (2004–2008); Zainal Abidin Zin (2006–2008)	Abdullah Ahmad Badawi (II)
	Muhammad Muhammad Taib (b. 1945); Senator	BN (UMNO)	Minister of Rural and Regional Development	19 March 2008	9 April 2009	Joseph Kurup; Joseph Entulu Belaun	Abdullah Ahmad Badawi (III)
	Shafie Apdal (b. 1957); MP for Semporna	BN (UMNO)	Minister of Rural and Regional Development	10 April 2009	29 July 2015	Hasan Malek (2009–2013); Joseph Entulu Belaun (2009–2013); Alexander Nanta Linggi (2013–2018)	Najib Razak (I • II)
	Ismail Sabri Yaakob (b. 1960); MP for Bera	BN (UMNO)	Minister of Rural and Regional Development	29 July 2015	9 May 2018	Alexander Nanta Linggi; Ahmad Jazlan Yaakub	Najib Razak (II)
	Rina Harun (b. 1973); MP for Titiwangsa	PH (BERSATU)	Minister of Rural Development	21 May 2018	24 February 2020	Sivarasa Rasiah	Mahathir Mohamad (VII)
	Dr. Abdul Latiff Ahmad (b.1958); MP for Mersing	PN (BERSATU)	Minister of Rural Development	10 March 2020	16 August 2021	Abdul Rahman Mohamad; Henry Sum Agong	Muhyiddin Yassin (I)
	Mahdzir Khalid (b. 1960); MP for Padang Terap	BN (UMNO)	Minister of Rural Development	30 August 2021	24 November 2022	Abdul Rahman Mohamad; Hasbi Habibollah	Ismail Sabri Yaakob (I)
	Ahmad Zahid Hamidi (b. 1953) (Deputy Prime Minister); MP for Bagan Datuk	BN (UMNO)	Minister of Rural and Regional Development	3 December 2022	Incumbent	Rubiah Wang	Anwar Ibrahim (I)

=== Regional development ===
The following individuals have been appointed as Minister of Regional Development, or any of its precedent titles:

Political party: BN

Portrait	Name (Birth–Death) Constituency	Political party	Title	Took office	Left office	Deputy Minister	Prime Minister (Cabinet)
	Asri Muda (1923–1992); MP for Nilam Puri	BN (PAS)	Minister of Land and Regional Development	1976	1977	Sulaiman Daud	Hussein Onn (I)
	Abdul Kadir Yusuf (1917–1992); MP for Tenggaroh	BN (UMNO)	Minister of Land and Regional Development	1977	1980	Vacant (1977–1978); Zainal Abidin Zin (1978–1980)	Hussein Onn (I • II)
	Shariff Ahmad (1915–2003); MP for Jerantut	BN (UMNO)	Minister of Land and Regional Development	1980	1982	Sanusi Junid (1977–1978); Vacant (1981–1982)	Hussein Onn (II); Mahathir Mohamad (I)
	Abdul Aziz Shamsuddin (1938–2020); MP for Shah Alam	BN (UMNO)	Minister of Rural and Regional Development	27 March 2004	18 March 2008	Awang Adek Hussin (2004–2006); Tiki Lafe (2004–2008); Zainal Abidin Zin (2006–2008)	Abdullah Ahmad Badawi (II)
	Muhammad Muhammad Taib (b. 1945); Senator	BN (UMNO)	Minister of Rural and Regional Development	19 March 2008	9 April 2009	Joseph Kurup; Joseph Entulu Belaun	Abdullah Ahmad Badawi (III)
	Shafie Apdal (b. 1957); MP for Semporna	BN (UMNO)	Minister of Rural and Regional Development	10 April 2009	29 July 2015	Hasan Malek (2009–2013); Joseph Entulu Belaun (2009–2013); Alexander Nanta Linggi (2013–2018)	Najib Razak (I • II)
	Ismail Sabri Yaakob (b. 1960); MP for Bera	BN (UMNO)	Minister of Rural and Regional Development	29 July 2015	9 May 2018	Alexander Nanta Linggi; Ahmad Jazlan Yaakub	Najib Razak (II)
	Ahmad Zahid Hamidi (b. 1953) (Deputy Prime Minister); MP for Bagan Datuk	BN (UMNO)	Minister of Rural and Regional Development	3 December 2022	Incumbent	Rubiah Wang	Anwar Ibrahim (I)
