= Kok Lanas =

Kok Lanas may refer to:

- Kok Lanas, Kelantan, a town in Kota Bharu district, Kelantan, Malaysia
- Kok Lanas (state constituency)
- Kok Lanas (federal constituency)
