= Muhammad Islahuddin Abas =

Malaysian politician

Yang Berhormat Tuan Muhammad Islahuddin Abas MP
- محمد إصلاح الدين عباس

Member of the Malaysian Parliament for Mersing
- Incumbent
- Assumed office 19 December 2022
- Preceded by: Abdul Latiff Ahmad (BN–UMNO)
- Majority: 2,337 (2022)

Personal details
- Party: Malaysian United Indigenous Party (BERSATU)
- Other political affiliations: Perikatan Nasional (PN)
- Children: 6
- Occupation: Politician

Muhammad Islahuddin bin Abas is a Malaysian politician who has served as the Member of Parliament for Mersing since November 2022. He took over the seat from Abdul Latiff Ahmad, the incumbent who previously held it for five terms. He is a member of the Malaysian United Indigenous Party (BERSATU), a component party of Perikatan Nasional (PN), and is currently its Johor state Information Chief.

== Election results ==
Parliament of Malaysia
Year	Constituency	Candidate	Votes	Pct	Opponent(s)	Votes	Pct	Ballots cast	Majority	Turnout
2022	P154 Mersing	Muhammad Islahuddin Abas (BERSATU)	21,066	44.91%	Abdul Latif Bandi (UMNO)	18,729	39.93%	47,469	2,337	70.77%
2022	P154 Mersing	Muhammad Islahuddin Abas (BERSATU)	21,066	44.91%	Fatin Zulaikha Zaidi (DAP)	6,813	14.52%	47,469	2,337	70.77%
2022	P154 Mersing	Muhammad Islahuddin Abas (BERSATU)	21,066	44.91%	Nurfatimah Ibrahim (PEJUANG)	209	0.45%	47,469	2,337	70.77%
2022	P154 Mersing	Muhammad Islahuddin Abas (BERSATU)	21,066	44.91%	Ismail Don (IND)	89	0.19%	47,469	2,337	70.77%

== Honours ==
=== Honours of Malaysia ===
- Malaysia
  - Recipient of the 17th Yang di-Pertuan Agong Installation Medal (2024)
