= Abdul Latiff Ahmad =

Malaysian politician (born 1958)

Yang Berbahagia Datuk Abdul Latiff Ahmad DMSM SMJ PIS
- عبداللطيف أحمد

Minister in the Prime Minister's Department; (Special Functions)
- In office 30 August 2021 – 24 November 2022
- Monarch: Abdullah
- Prime Minister: Ismail Sabri Yaakob
- Deputy: Mastura Mohd Yazid
- Preceded by: Mohd Redzuan Md Yusof
- Succeeded by: Armizan Mohd Ali
- Constituency: Mersing

Minister of Rural Development
- In office 10 March 2020 – 16 August 2021
- Monarch: Abdullah
- Prime Minister: Muhyiddin Yassin
- Deputy: Abdul Rahman Mohamad; Henry Sum Agong
- Preceded by: Rina Harun
- Succeeded by: Mahdzir Khalid
- Constituency: Mersing

Deputy Minister of Defence
- In office 10 April 2009 – 15 May 2013
- Monarchs: Mizan Zainal Abidin; Abdul Halim
- Prime Minister: Najib Razak
- Minister: Ahmad Zahid Hamidi
- Preceded by: Abu Seman Yusop
- Succeeded by: Abdul Rahim Bakri
- Constituency: Mersing

Deputy Minister of Health
- In office 27 March 2004 – 9 April 2009
- Monarchs: Sirajuddin; Mizan Zainal Abidin
- Prime Minister: Abdullah Ahmad Badawi
- Minister: Chua Soi Lek (2004–2008); Ong Ka Ting (Acting) (2008); Liow Tiong Lai (2008–2009)
- Preceded by: Abu Seman Yusop
- Succeeded by: Rosnah Abdul Rashid Shirlin
- Constituency: Mersing

Deputy Minister of Human Resources
- In office 15 December 1999 – 26 March 2004
- Monarchs: Salahuddin; Sirajuddin
- Prime Minister: Mahathir Mohamad; Abdullah Ahmad Badawi
- Minister: Fong Chan Onn
- Preceded by: Affifudin Omar
- Succeeded by: Abdul Rahman Bakar
- Constituency: Mersing

Chairman of the; Syarikat Perumahan Negara Berhad
- In office 11 June 2013 – 30 January 2019
- Minister: Najib Razak (2013–2018); Ahmad Husni Hanadzlah (2013–2016); Johari Abdul Ghani (2016–2018); Lim Guan Eng (2018); Zuraida Kamaruddin (2018–2019)
- CEO: Ahmad Azizi Ali
- Preceded by: Idris Haron
- Succeeded by: Mohammad Mentek

Member of the Malaysian Parliament for Mersing
- In office 29 November 1999 – 19 November 2022
- Preceded by: Zainal Abidin Osman; (BN–UMNO)
- Succeeded by: Muhammad Islahuddin Abas (PN-BERSATU)
- Majority: 10,861 (1999); 14,573 (2004); 13,736 (2008); 15,747 (2013); 8,459 (2018)

Faction represented in Dewan Rakyat
- 1999–2018: Barisan Nasional
- 2018–2019: Independent
- 2019–2020: Pakatan Harapan
- 2020: Malaysian United Indigenous Party
- 2020–2022: Perikatan Nasional

Faction represented in Johor State Legislative Assembly
- 1995–1999: Barisan Nasional

Personal details
- Born: 9 July 1958 (age 68) Ayer Hitam, Kluang, Johor, Federation of Malaya
- Party: PPBM (2019-present); Independent (2018-2019); UMNO (until 2018)
- Other political affiliations: Perikatan Nasional (PN) (2020-present); Pakatan Harapan (PH) (2019-2020); Barisan Nasional (BN) (until 2018)
- Education: University of Malaya
- Occupation: Politician
- Abdul Latiff Ahmad on Facebook

Abdul Latiff bin Ahmad (Jawi: عبداللطيف بن أحمد ; born 9 July 1958) is a Malaysian politician who served as Minister in the Prime Minister's Department for Special Functions from 2021 to 2022. He was the Member of Parliament (MP) for Mersing from 1999 to 2022.

Abdul Latiff previously served as Minister of Rural Development from 2020 to 2021. He held various posts such as Deputy Minister of Defence, Deputy Minister of Health, and Deputy Minister of Human Resources.

Abdul Latiff was a member of the United Malays National Organisation (UMNO), a component party of the Barisan Nasional (BN) coalition. He left UMNO in 2018, and joined the Malaysian United Indigenous Party (BERSATU) the following year. BERSATU is a component party of the Perikatan Nasional (PN) coalition.

== Political career ==
Abd Latiff was firstly elected to the Johor State Legislative Assembly for Endau seat in 1995 election. In the 1999 general election he switched to federal politics by contesting and winning to be the MP of Mersing constituency in Johor, and thereafter served as Deputy Minister of Human Resources (1999 to 2004), Deputy Minister of Health (2004 to 2008) and Deputy Minister of Defence (2008 to 2013). He was reelected MP for the Mersing parliamentary seat in the consecutive 2004, 2008, 2013 and 2018 general elections.

Abd Latiff was dropped from Najib Razak's cabinet after the 2013 general election, and was appointed the chairman of the government-linked housing development company Syarikat Perumahan Negara Berhad (SPNB). He left SPNB in early 2019 after BN lost as the ruling federal government to Pakatan Harapan (PH) in the 2018 election.

== Controversy ==
=== Insulting UMNO ===
On 8 July 2020, he said UMNO was an unscrupulous party in Sabah after its leaders jumped to Parti Pribumi Bersatu Malaysia (Bersatu). Earlier, a video featuring Abdul Latiff's statement in an open forum on the matter was spread on social media where he mentioned "Sabahans do not mention jumping but call migration and usually from Berjaya to PBS, PBS goes to UMNO. Meanwhile, Abdul Latiff's statement met with opposition from UMNO leaders who are now urging him to resign. After receiving word of mouth from UMNO leaders, finally he admitted his mistake. While reminding UMNO, the real enemy is the opponents and they should not quarrel with each other, he said he apologized if the statement regarding "UMNO does not work in Sabah" was misunderstood and hurt the hearts of many parties.

== Election results ==
Johor State Legislative Assembly
Year	Constituency	Candidate	Votes	Pct	Opponent(s)	Votes	Pct	Ballots cast	Majority	Turnout
1995	N09 Endau	Abdul Latiff Ahmad (UMNO)	7,315	69%	Sheikh Abdullah Said Salleh (PAS)	3,302	31%	10,668	4,013	64.36%

Parliament of Malaysia
Year	Constituency	Candidate	Votes	Pct	Opponent(s)	Votes	Pct	Ballots cast	Majority	Turnout
1999	P129 Mersing	Abdul Latiff Ahmad (UMNO)	18,821	70.28%	Idris Tukachil (PAS)	7,960	29.72%	27,617	10,861	70.29%
2004	P154 Mersing	Abdul Latiff Ahmad (UMNO)	19,222	80.52%	Idris Tukachil (PAS)	4,649	19.48%	24,484	14,573	72.25%
2008	P154 Mersing	Abdul Latiff Ahmad (UMNO)	20,116	75.92%	Shahar Abdullah (PAS)	6,380	24.08%	27,548	13,736	75.59%
2013	P154 Mersing	Abdul Latiff Ahmad (UMNO)	26,184	71.50%	Roslan Nikmat (PAS)	10,437	28.50%	37,393	15,747	84.03%
2018	P154 Mersing	Abdul Latiff Ahmad (UMNO)	19,806	53.00%	Md Nasir Hashim (PPBM)	11,347	30.37%	38,306	8,459	79.51%
2018	P154 Mersing	Abdul Latiff Ahmad (UMNO)	19,806	53.00%	A. Rahman A. Hamid (PAS)	6,215	16.63%	38,306	8,459	79.51%

== Honours ==
=== Honours of Malaysia ===
- Johor
  - Second Class of the Sultan Ibrahim Medal (PIS II) (1995)
  - Companion of the Order of the Crown of Johor (SMJ) (1997)
- Malacca
  - Companion Class I of the Exalted Order of Malacca (DMSM) – Datuk (2003)
