= Kok Lanas (federal constituency) =

Kelantan constituency

Defunct federal constituency
- Legislature: Dewan Rakyat
- Constituency created: 1984
- Constituency abolished: 1995
- First contested: 1986
- Last contested: 1990

Kok Lanas was a federal constituency in Kelantan, Malaysia, that was represented in the Dewan Rakyat from 1986 to 1995.

The federal constituency was created in the 1984 redistribution and was mandated to return a single member to the Dewan Rakyat under the first past the post voting system.

== History ==
It was abolished in 1995 when it was redistributed.

=== Representation history ===
Members of Parliament for Kok Lanas
Parliament	No	Years	Member	Party	Vote Share
Constituency created from Machang, Pasir Puteh and Nilam Puri
7th	P025	1986–1990	Abdullah Ahmad (عبدالله احمد)	BN (UMNO)	14,099; 56.23%
8th	P025	1990–1995	Mohamad Shukri Mohamed (محمد شكري محمد)	S46	19,203; 67.27%
Constituency abolished, split into Kubang Kerian and Peringat

=== State constituency ===
Parliamentary constituency	State constituency						
Parliamentary constituency	1955–1959*	1959–1974	1974–1986	1986–1995	1995–2004	2004–2018	2018–present
Kok Lanas				Ketereh			
Kok Lanas				Pulai Chondong			
Kok Lanas				Selising			

=== Historical boundaries ===
State constituency	Area
State constituency	1984
Ketereh	Kampung Banggol Pauh; Kampung Buloh Poh; Kampung Kemubu; Ketereh; Kok Lanas
Pulai Chondong	Alor Melaka; Joh; Kampung Kemahang; Pangkal Gong; Pulai Chondong
Selising	Bukit Abal; Bukit Merbau; Seligi; Selising; Tasik Pauh

== Election results ==
Malaysian general election, 1990
Party	Candidate	Votes	%	∆%
S46	Mohamad Shukri Mohamed	19,203	67.27	▲67.27
BN	Abdullah Ahmad	9,097	31.87	▼24.36
Independent	Wan Mohd. Husni Wan Ismail	245	0.86	▲0.86
Total valid votes		28,545	100.00	
Total rejected ballots		957		
Unreturned ballots		37,190		
Turnout		29,502	79.33	▲1.89
Registered electors		0		
Majority		10,106	35.40	▲22.94
S46 gain from BN		Swing		?

Malaysian general election, 1986
Party	Candidate	Votes	%
BN	Abdullah Ahmad	14,099	56.23
PAS	Ab Rahman Ahmad	10,975	43.77
Total valid votes		25,074	100.00
Total rejected ballots		472	
Unreturned ballots		0	
Turnout		25,546	77.44
Registered electors		32,990	
Majority		3,124	12.46
This was a new constituency created.
