= Demit =

State constituency in Kelantan, Malaysia

Demit (N19)
Kelantan constituency

State constituency
- Legislature: Kelantan State Legislative Assembly
MLA
Mohd Asri Mat Daud
PN
- Constituency created: 2003
- First contested: 2004
- Last contested: 2023

Demographics
- Population (2020): 53,255
- Electors (2023): 40,561

Demit is a state constituency in Kelantan, Malaysia, that has been represented in the Kelantan State Legislative Assembly.

The state constituency was first contested in 2004 and is mandated to return a single Assemblyman to the Kelantan State Legislative Assembly under the first-past-the-post voting system.

== Demographics ==
As of 2020, Demit has a population of 53,255 people.

Ethnic breakdown of Demit's electorate as of 2023
1. Malay (96.0%)
2. Chinese (3.16%)
3. Other ethnicities (0.54%)
4. Indian (0.25%)

== History ==
=== Polling districts ===
According to the Gazette issued on 30 March 2018, the Demit constituency has a total of 12 polling districts.

State Constituency	Polling Districts	Code	Location
Demit（N19）	Demit	024/19/01	SK Kubang Kerian 3
Demit（N19）	Wakaf Tanjong	024/19/02	SK Mentuan
Demit（N19）	Mentuan	024/19/03	SK Mentuan
Demit（N19）	Kenali	024/19/04	SMK Kubang Kerian
Demit（N19）	Pulong	024/19/05	Maahad Ar-Rahmah Kenali
Demit（N19）	Kampung Chicha	024/19/06	SK Kubang Kerian (2)
Demit（N19）	Kampung Wakaf Stan	024/19/07	SK Wakaf Stan
Demit（N19）	Binjai	024/19/08	SMA (Arab) Al-Yunusiah
Demit（N19）	Lubok Pukol	024/19/09	SK Banggu
Demit（N19）	Banggu	024/19/10	SK Banggu
Demit（N19）	Mentera	024/19/11	SK Mentera
Demit（N19）	Huda	024/19/12	SK Kubang Kerian (1)

=== Representation history ===
Members of the Legislative Assembly for Demit
Assembly	No	Years	Member	Party
Constituency created from Kenali
11th	N19	2004–2008	Mohamed Daud	PAS
12th	N19	2008–2013	Muhamad Mustafa	PR (PAS)
13th	N19	2013–2018	Mumtaz Md. Nawi	PR (PAS)
14th	N19	2018–2020	Mumtaz Md. Nawi	PAS
14th	N19	2020–2023	Mumtaz Md. Nawi	PN (PAS)
15th	N19	2023–present	Mohd Asri Mat Daud	PN (PAS)

== Election results ==
Kelantan state election, 2023: Demit
Party	Candidate	Votes	%	∆%
PAS	Mohd Asri Mat Daud	18,683	75.39	▲12.84
PH	Ismail Ghani	6,098	24.61	▲24.61
Total valid votes		24,781	100.00	
Total rejected ballots		144		
Unreturned ballots		74		
Turnout		24,999	61.63	▼16.41
Registered electors		40,561		
Majority		12,585	50.78	▲9.14
PAS hold		Swing		

Kelantan state election, 2018: Demit
Party	Candidate	Votes	%	∆%
PAS	Mohd Asri Mat Daud	13,621	62.55	▼6.93
BN	Nurul Amal Mohd Fauzi	4,553	20.91	▼9.61
PKR	Wan Ahmad Kamil Wan Abdullah	3,601	16.54	▲16.54
Total valid votes		21,775	100.00	
Total rejected ballots		290		
Unreturned ballots		251		
Turnout		22,316	78.04	▼5.37
Registered electors		28,597		
Majority		9,068	41.64	▲2.68
PAS hold		Swing		

Kelantan state election, 2013: Demit
Party	Candidate	Votes	%	∆%
PAS	Mumtaz Md Nawi	15,302	69.48	▲6.37
BN	Wan Mohd Nazi Wan Hamat	6,721	30.52	▼6.37
Total valid votes		22,023	100.00	
Total rejected ballots		287		
Unreturned ballots		95		
Turnout		22,405	83.41	▼0.20
Registered electors		26,861		
Majority		8,581	38.96	▲12.73
PAS hold		Swing		

Kelantan state election, 2008: Demit
Party	Candidate	Votes	%	∆%
PAS	Muhammad Mustafa	11,547	63.12	▲1.78
BN	Muhammad Abdul Ghani	6,748	36.88	▼1.78
Total valid votes		18,295	100.00	
Total rejected ballots		169		
Unreturned ballots		48		
Turnout		18,512	83.61	▲1.64
Registered electors		22,141		
Majority		4,799	26.23	▲3.55
PAS hold		Swing		

Kelantan state election, 2004: Demit
Party	Candidate	Votes	%
PAS	Mohamed Daud	8,807	61.34
BN	Muhammad Abdul Ghani	5,551	38.66
Total valid votes		14,358	100.00
Total rejected ballots		458	
Unreturned ballots		0	
Turnout		14,816	81.97
Registered electors		18,074	
Majority		3,256	22.68
This was a new constituency created.
