= Mumtaz Md Nawi =

Malaysian politician

Yang Berhormat Dato' Mumtaz Md Nawi DJMK JMK MP
- مُمْتَاز مُحَمَّد نَوِي
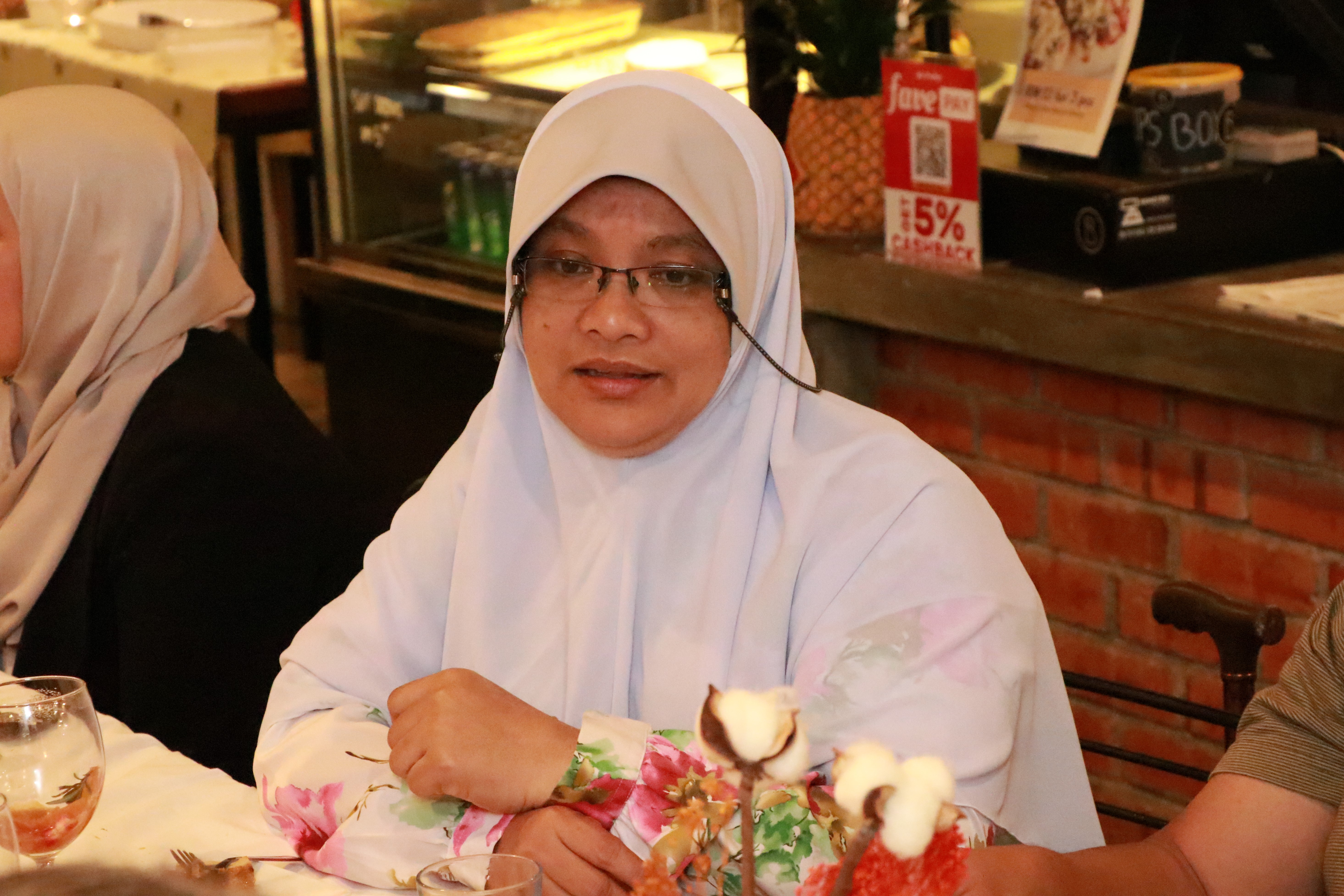

Member of the Malaysian Parliament for Tumpat
- Incumbent
- Assumed office 19 November 2022
- Preceded by: Che Abdullah Mat Nawi (PN–PAS)
- Majority: 34,793 (2022)

Member of the Kelantan State Executive Council
- 2013–2018: Chairwoman of the Family Development, Welfare and People Wellbeing
- 2018–2023: Chairwoman of the Welfare, Women and Family Development

Member of the Kelantan State Legislative Assembly for Demit
- In office 5 May 2013 – 12 August 2023
- Preceded by: Muhamad Mustafa (PAS)
- Succeeded by: Mohd Asri Mat Daud (PN–PAS)
- Majority: 8,581 (2013); 9,068 (2018)

Senator Elected by the Kelantan State Legislative Assembly
- In office 19 July 2006 – 5 July 2012 Serving with Wan Ubaidah Wan Omar (2006–2008); Ahmad Rusli Iberahim (2008–2011); Johari Mat (2011–2012)
- Monarchs: Syed Sirajuddin (2006); Mizan Zainal Abidin (2006–2011); Abdul Halim (2011–2012)
- Prime Minister: Abdullah Ahmad Badawi (2006–2009); Najib Razak (2009–2012)
- Preceded by: Siti Zailah Mohd Yusoff
- Succeeded by: Khairiah Mohamed

Faction represented in Dewan Rakyat
- 2022–: Perikatan Nasional

Faction represented in Kelantan State Legislative Assembly
- 2013–2020: Malaysian Islamic Party
- 2020–2023: Perikatan Nasional

Faction represented in Dewan Negara
- 2006–2012: Malaysian Islamic Party

Personal details
- Born: 30 March 1972 (age 54) Kelantan, Malaysia
- Citizenship: Malaysia
- Party: Malaysian Islamic Party (PAS)
- Other political affiliations: Pakatan Rakyat (PR) (2008–2015); Gagasan Sejahtera (GS) (2016–2020); Perikatan Nasional (PN) (since 2020)
- Spouse: Mohd Sukiman Yasin
- Parent(s): Md Nawi Said; Siti Talhah Ismail
- Education: International Islamic University Malaysia (LLB)
- Occupation: Politician
- Profession: Lawyer

Mumtaz binti Md Nawi (born 30 March 1972) is a Malaysian politician and lawyer who has served as the Member of Parliament (MP) for Tumpat since November 2022. She served as Member of the Kelantan State Executive Council (EXCO) in the Perikatan Nasional (PN) state administration under Menteri Besar Ahmad Yakob and Member of the Kelantan State Legislative Assembly (MLA) for Demit from May 2013 to August 2023. She is a member of the Malaysian Islamic Party (PAS), a component party of the PN coalition.

== Election results ==
Parliament of Malaysia
Year	Constituency	Candidate	Votes	Pct	Opponent(s)	Votes	Pct	Ballots cast	Majority	Turnout
2022	P019 Tumpat	Mumtaz Md Nawi (PAS)	65,426	62.51%	Che Abdullah Mat Nawi (UMNO)	30,633	29.27%	106,131	34,793	70.07%
2022	P019 Tumpat	Mumtaz Md Nawi (PAS)	65,426	62.51%	Wan Ahmad Johari Wan Omar (AMANAH)	7,762	7.42%	106,131	34,793	70.07%
2022	P019 Tumpat	Mumtaz Md Nawi (PAS)	65,426	62.51%	Che Mohamad Aswari Che Ali (PUTRA)	593	0.57%	106,131	34,793	70.07%
2022	P019 Tumpat	Mumtaz Md Nawi (PAS)	65,426	62.51%	Khairul Azwan Kamarrudin (WARISAN)	245	0.23%	106,131	34,793	70.07%

Kelantan State Legislative Assembly
Year	Constituency	Candidate	Votes	Pct	Opponent(s)	Votes	Pct	Ballots cast	Majority	Turnout
2013	N19 Demit	Mumtaz Md Nawi (PAS)	15,302	69.48%	Wan Mohd Nazi Wan Hamat (UMNO)	6,721	30.52%	22,310	8,581	83.40%
2018	N19 Demit	Mumtaz Md Nawi (PAS)	13,621	62.55%	Nurul Amal Mohd Fauzi (UMNO)	4,553	20.91%	22,316	9,068	79.00%
2018	N19 Demit	Mumtaz Md Nawi (PAS)	13,621	62.55%	Wan Ahmad Kamil Wan Abdullah (AMANAH)	3,601	16.54%	22,316	9,068	79.00%

== Honours ==
=== Honours of Malaysia ===
- Malaysia
  - Recipient of the 17th Yang di-Pertuan Agong Installation Medal (2024)
- Kelantan
  - Knight Commander of the Order of the Life of the Crown of Kelantan (DJMK) – Dato' (2019)
  - Companion of the Order of the Life of the Crown of Kelantan (JMK) (2016)

== See also ==
- Members of the Dewan Negara, 11th Malaysian Parliament
- Members of the Dewan Negara, 12th Malaysian Parliament
- List of people who have served in both Houses of the Malaysian Parliament
