= Lawas (federal constituency) =

Federal constituency of Sarawak, Malaysia

Lawas (P222)
Sarawak constituency

Federal constituency
- Legislature: Dewan Rakyat
- MP: Henry Sum Agong; GPS
- Constituency created: 2005
- First contested: 2008
- Last contested: 2022

Demographics
- Population (2020): 36,604
- Electors (2022): 33,655
- Area (km²): 3,889
- Pop. density (per km²): 9.4

Lawas is a federal constituency in Limbang Division (Lawas District), Sarawak, Malaysia, that has been represented in the Dewan Rakyat since 2008.

The federal constituency was created in the 2005 redistribution and is mandated to return a single member to the Dewan Rakyat under the first past the post voting system.

== Demographics ==
第15届全国大选-东方日报-2022

Ethnic breakdown of Lawas's electorate as of 2022
1. Sarawak bumiputera (43.9%)
2. Malay-Muslim bumiputera (42.7%)
3. Chinese (11.9%)
4. Other ethnicities (1.50%)

As of 2020, Lawas has a population of 36,604 people.

Age breakdown of Lawas's electorate as of 2022
1. 18-20 (7.08%)
2. 21-29 (22.2%)
3. 30-39 (21.7%)
4. 40-49 (16.9%)
5. 50-59 (14.7%)
6. 60-69 (10.9%)
7. 70-79 (4.34%)
8. 80-89 (1.57%)
9. above 90 (0.60%)
Gender breakdown of Lawas's electorate as of 2022
1. Male (51.8%)
2. Female (48.2%)

== History ==
=== Polling districts ===
According to the Official Gazette dated 31 October 2022, the Lawas constituency has a total of 42 polling districts.

State constituency	Polling Districts	Code	Location
Ba'kelalan（N81）	Semadoh	222/81/01	SK Lg. Semadoh
Ba'kelalan（N81）	Beriwan	222/81/02	Dewan Kpg. Puru Sia; SK Puru Sia
Ba'kelalan（N81）	Maligan	222/81/03	SK Lg. Sebangan
Ba'kelalan（N81）	Trusan	222/81/04	Dewan Masyarakat Trusan
Ba'kelalan（N81）	Sukang	222/81/05	SK Lg. Sukang
Ba'kelalan（N81）	Lupeng	222/81/06	SK Lg. Lupeng
Ba'kelalan（N81）	Ba'kelalan	222/81/07	SK Ba'kelalan
Ba'kelalan（N81）	Temarop	222/81/08	Dewan Masyarakat Lg. Temarop
Ba'kelalan（N81）	Suang	222/81/09	Balai Raya Long Kachu
Ba'kelalan（N81）	Talis	222/81/10	Pusat Kebudayaan Lun Bawang Kpg. Lg. Tuan
Ba'kelalan（N81）	Lapadan	222/81/11	SK Tang Lapadan
Ba'kelalan（N81）	Tengoa	222/81/12	SK Lg. Tengoa
Ba'kelalan（N81）	Tuma	222/81/13	SK Lg. Tuma Lawas
Ba'kelalan（N81）	Pengaleh	222/81/14	Dewan Masyarakat Kpg. Lg. Pengaleh
Ba'kelalan（N81）	Siang	222/81/15	SK Siang-Siang Lawas
Ba'kelalan（N81）	Pangi	222/81/16	SK Batu Lima
Ba'kelalan（N81）	Batu Tiga	222/81/17	Institut Latihan Islam Malaysia (ILIM), Kampus Lawas JAKIM
Ba'kelalan（N81）	Lampaki	222/81/18	Balai Raya Kpg. Undop
Ba'kelalan（N81）	Muncu	222/81/19	Balai Raya Kpg. Muncu Merapok
Ba'kelalan（N81）	Ranchangan	222/81/20	SK Kpg. Lintang Trusan
Bukit Sari (N82)	Sundar	222/82/01	SK Sundar
Bukit Sari (N82)	Bukit Sari	222/82/02	SK Kuala Lawas
Bukit Sari (N82)	Merapok	222/82/03	SK Merapok
Bukit Sari (N82)	Lawas	222/82/04	SJK (C) Chung Hua Lawas
Bukit Sari (N82)	Gelapas	222/82/05	SK Trusan
Bukit Sari (N82)	Awat	222/82/06	SK Awat-Awat Sundar
Bukit Sari (N82)	Baru	222/82/07	SMK Sundar
Bukit Sari (N82)	Luagan	222/82/08	SK Luagan Sundar
Bukit Sari (N82)	Aru	222/82/09	SK Aru Baru Sundar
Bukit Sari (N82)	Pagar	222/82/10	Dewan Masyarakat Sundar
Bukit Sari (N82)	Katong	222/82/11	Dewan Kpg.Tanjong Katong
Bukit Sari (N82)	Pemukat	222/82/12	Dewan Masyarakat Kpg. Pemukat
Bukit Sari (N82)	Dato	222/82/13	SK Kpg. Seberang Kuala Lawas
Bukit Sari (N82)	Belipat	222/82/14	SK Belipat Lawas
Bukit Sari (N82)	Sualai	222/82/15	Dewan Kpg. Sualai; Dewan Masyarakat Kpg. Siang-Siang Laut
Bukit Sari (N82)	Punang	222/82/16	SK Puang Lawas
Bukit Sari (N82)	Sibagol	222/82/17	Dewan Masyarakat Kpg. Ulu Merapok
Bukit Sari (N82)	Melusok	222/82/18	SRA MIS Lawas
Bukit Sari (N82)	Temangis	222/82/19	SK Pusat Lawas
Bukit Sari (N82)	Mission	222/82/20	Dewan Kpg. Baru Mission
Bukit Sari (N82)	Ladang Baru	222/82/21	SK Ladang Baru Lawas
Bukit Sari (N82)	Silat	222/82/22	Dewan Kpg. Berjumpa

=== Representation history ===
Members of Parliament for Lawas
Parliament	No	Years	Member	Party	Vote Share
Constituency created from Bukit Mas
12th	P222	2008-2013	Henry Sum Agong	BN (PBB)	8,526; 92.07%
13th	P222	2013-2018	Henry Sum Agong	BN (PBB)	9,928; 71.45%
14th	P222	2018	Henry Sum Agong	BN (PBB)	10,347; 70.44%
14th	P222	2018-2022	Henry Sum Agong	GPS (PBB)	10,347; 70.44%
15th	P222	2022–present	Henry Sum Agong	GPS (PBB)	11,361; 62.40%

=== State constituency ===
Parliamentary constituency	State constituency					
Parliamentary constituency	1969–1978	1978–1990	1990–1999	1999–2008	2008–2016	2016−present
Lawas					Ba'kelalan	
Lawas					Bukit Sari	

=== Historical boundaries ===
State Constituency	Area	
State Constituency	2005	2015
Ba'kelalan	Bario; Ba'kelalan; Long Lapukan; Long Meradap; Long Sukang	Ba'kelalan; Long Lapukan; Long Meradap; Long Sukang; Siang-Siang
Bukit Sari	Awat-Awat; Lawas; Merapok; Punang; Sundar	

=== Current state assembly members ===
No.	State Constituency	Member	Coalition (Party)
N81	Ba'kelalan	Baru Bian	GPS (PDP)
N82	Bukit Sari	Awang Tengah Ali Hasan	GPS (PBB)

=== Local governments & postcodes ===
No.	State Constituency	Local Government	Postcode
N81	Bukit Sari	Lawas District Council	98800 Sundar; 98850 Lawas
N82	Ba'kelalan	Lawas District Council	98800 Sundar; 98850 Lawas

== Election results ==
Malaysian general election, 2022
Party	Candidate	Votes	%	∆%
GPS	Henry Sum Agong	11,361	62.40	▲62.40
PSB	Baru Bian	5,684	31.22	▲31.22
PH	Japar Suyut	1,163	6.39	▲6.39
Total valid votes		18,208	100.00	
Total rejected ballots		198		
Unreturned ballots		89		
Turnout		18,495	54.10	▼14.22
Registered electors		33,655		
Majority		5,677	31.18	▼10.98
GPS gain from BN		Swing		?
Source(s) https://lom.agc.gov.my/ilims/upload/portal/akta/outputp/1753265/PARLIMEN%20SARAWAK%20(PUB%20620).pdf

Malaysian general election, 2018
Party	Candidate	Votes	%	∆%
BN	Henry Sum Agong	10,037	70.44	▼1.01
PKR	Danny Piri	4,037	28.33	▲28.33
Independent	Mohamad Brahim	176	1.24	▲1.24
Total valid votes		14,250	100.00	
Total rejected ballots		157		
Unreturned ballots		143		
Turnout		14,550	68.32	▼6.57
Registered electors		21,297		
Majority		6,000	42.11	▼1.29
BN hold		Swing		
Source(s) "His Majesty's Government Gazette - Notice of Contested Election, Parliament for the State of Sarawak [P.U. (B) 247/2018]" (PDF). Attorney General's Chambers of Malaysia. 3 May 2018. "Federal Government Gazette - Results of Contested Election and Statements of the Poll after the Official Addition of Votes, Parliamentary Constituencies for the State of Sarawak [P.U. (B) 321/2018]" (PDF). Attorney General's Chambers of Malaysia. 28 May 2018. Archived from the original (PDF) on 2019-12-29.

Malaysian general election, 2013
Party	Candidate	Votes	%	∆%
BN	Henry Sum Agong	9,928	71.45	▼20.62
DAP	Bob Baru Langub	3,898	28.05	▲28.05
STAR	Alirahman Kamseh	69	0.50	▲0.50
Total valid votes		13,895	100.00	
Total rejected ballots		177		
Unreturned ballots		41		
Turnout		14,113	74.89	▲15.45
Registered electors		18,845		
Majority		6,030	43.40	▼40.74
BN hold		Swing		
Source(s) "Federal Government Gazette - Notice of Contested Election, Parliament for the State of Sarawak [P.U. (B) 184/2013]" (PDF). Attorney General's Chambers of Malaysia. 26 April 2013. Archived from the original (PDF) on 2018-09-30. "Federal Government Gazette - Results of Contested Election and Statements of the Poll after the Official Addition of Votes, Parliamentary Constituencies for the State of Sarawak [P.U. (B) 225/2013]" (PDF). Attorney General's Chambers of Malaysia. 22 May 2013. Archived from the original (PDF) on 2018-09-30.

Malaysian general election, 2008
Party	Candidate	Votes	%
BN	Henry Sum Agong	8,526	92.07
PKR	Japar Suyut	734	7.93
Total valid votes		9,260	100.00
Total rejected ballots		82	
Unreturned ballots		0	
Turnout		9,342	59.44
Registered electors		15,717	
Majority		7,792	84.14
This was a new constituency created.
