= Henry Sum Agong =

Malaysian politician

Yang Berhormat Dato Henry Sum Agong PSBS PBS MP

Deputy Minister of Transport
- In office 30 August 2021 – 24 November 2022
- Monarch: Abdullah
- Prime Minister: Ismail Sabri Yaakob
- Minister: Wee Ka Siong
- Preceded by: Hasbi Habibollah
- Succeeded by: Hasbi Habibollah
- Constituency: Lawas

Deputy Minister of Rural Development II
- In office 10 March 2020 – 16 August 2021 Serving with Abdul Rahman Mohamad
- Monarch: Abdullah
- Prime Minister: Muhyiddin Yassin
- Minister: Abdul Latiff Ahmad
- Preceded by: Sivarasa Rasiah
- Succeeded by: Hasbi Habibollah
- Constituency: Lawas

Deputy Minister of Domestic Trade, Co-operatives and Consumerism
- In office 27 June 2016 – 9 May 2018
- Monarchs: Abdul Halim (Jun–Dec 2016); Muhammad V (2016–2018)
- Prime Minister: Najib Razak
- Minister: Hamzah Zainudin
- Preceded by: Ahmad Bashah Md Hanipah
- Succeeded by: Chong Chieng Jen (Domestic Trade, Consumerism); Mohd Hatta Ramli (Co-operatives)
- Constituency: Lawas

Member of the Malaysian Parliament for Lawas
- Incumbent
- Assumed office 8 March 2008
- Preceded by: Position established
- Majority: 7,792 (2008); 6,030 (2013); 6,000 (2018); 5,677 (2022)

Member of the Malaysian Parliament for Bukit Mas
- In office 29 November 1999 – 8 March 2008
- Preceded by: Michael Lisa Kaya (BN–PBB)
- Succeeded by: Position abolished
- Majority: 10,526 (1999); Walkover (2004)

Personal details
- Born: Henry Sum Agong; 18 February 1946 (age 80) British Military Administration (Borneo) (now Sarawak, Malaysia)
- Party: Parti Pesaka Bumiputera Bersatu (PBB)
- Other political affiliations: Barisan Nasional (BN) (–2018); Gabungan Parti Sarawak (GPS) (since 2018)
- Spouse: Tunung Palong
- Children: Christina Busak
- Occupation: Politician

Henry Sum Agong (born 18 February 1946) is a Malaysian politician who has served as the Member of Parliament (MP) for Lawas since March 2008. He served as the Deputy Minister of Transport in the Barisan Nasional (BN) administration under former prime minister Ismail Sabri Yaakob and former minister Wee Ka Siong from August 2021 to the collapse of the BN administration in November 2022 and the Deputy Minister of Rural Development II in the Perikatan Nasional (PN) administration under former prime minister Muhyiddin Yassin and former minister Abdul Latiff Ahmad from March 2020 to the collapse of the PN administration in August 2021. He also served as Deputy Minister of Domestic Trade, Co-operatives and Consumerism in the Barisan Nasional (BN) administration under former prime minister Najib Razak and former minister Hamzah Zainudin from June 2016 to May 2018 and MP for Bukit Mas from November 1999 to March 2008. He is a member of the Parti Pesaka Bumiputera Bersatu (PBB), a component party of the Gabungan Parti Sarawak (GPS) and formerly BN coalitions. He is the first deputy minister of the Lun Bawang ethnicity in the history of Malaysia. He is presently the oldest MP at the age of 80 years, 257 days.

Having represented the Bukit Mas constituency, Henry Sum moved to the seat of Lawas for the 2008 election, which he won with 92% of the vote.

== Election results ==
Parliament of Malaysia
Year	Constituency	Candidate	Votes	Pct	Opponent(s)	Votes	Pct	Ballots Cast	Majority	Turnout
1999	P193 Bukit Mas	Henry Sum Agong (PBB)	13,642	79.24%	Charlee Soh (keADILan)	3,116	18.10%	17,638	10,526	51.53%
1999	P193 Bukit Mas	Henry Sum Agong (PBB)	13,642	79.24%	Mohamad Brahim (IND)	459	2.67%	17,638	10,526	51.53%
2004	P219 Bukit Mas	Henry Sum Agong (PBB)	Walkover							
2008	P222 Lawas	Henry Sum Agong (PBB)	8,526	92.07%	Japar Suyut (PKR)	734	7.93%	9,342	7,792	59.44%
2013	P222 Lawas	Henry Sum Agong (PBB)	9,928	71.45%	Baru Langub (DAP)	3,898	28.05%	14,113	6,030	74.89%
2013	P222 Lawas	Henry Sum Agong (PBB)	9,928	71.45%	Alirahman Kamseh (STAR)	69	0.50%	14,113	6,030	74.89%
2018	P222 Lawas	Henry Sum Agong (PBB)	10,037	70.44%	Danny Piri (PKR)	4,037	28.33%	14,550	6,000	68.32%
2018	P222 Lawas	Henry Sum Agong (PBB)	10,037	70.44%	Mohamad Brahim (IND)	176	1.24%	14,550	6,000	68.32%
2022	P222 Lawas	Henry Sum Agong (PBB)	11,361	62.40%	Baru Bian (PSB)	5,684	31.22%	18,495	5,677	54.10%
2022	P222 Lawas	Henry Sum Agong (PBB)	11,361	62.40%	Japar Suyut (PKR)	1,163	6.39%	18,495	5,677	54.10%

== Honours ==
=== Honours of Malaysia ===
- Malaysia
  - Recipient of the 17th Yang di-Pertuan Agong Installation Medal (2024)
- Sarawak
  - Commander of the Most Exalted Order of the Star of Sarawak (PSBS) – Dato (2008)
  - Officer of the Most Exalted Order of the Star of Sarawak (PBS) (2003)

Parliament of Malaysia
New creation	Member of Parliament for Lawas; 8 March 2008–present	Incumbent
Preceded by Michael Lisa Kaya	Member of Parliament for Bukit Mas; 29 November 1999–7 March 2008	Constituency abolished
