= Annuar Musa =

Malaysian politician

Yang Berbahagia Tan Sri Datuk Seri Panglima Annuar Musa PSM SPDK SIMP DGSM
- أنور موسى
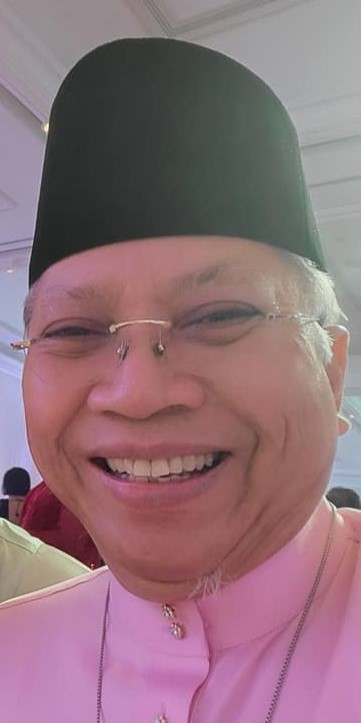
- Annuar in 2022

Minister of Communications and Multimedia
- In office 30 August 2021 – 24 November 2022
- Monarch: Abdullah
- Prime Minister: Ismail Sabri Yaakob
- Deputy: Zahidi Zainul Abidin
- Preceded by: Saifuddin Abdullah
- Succeeded by: Fahmi Fadzil as Minister of Communications and Digital
- Constituency: Ketereh

Minister of Federal Territories
- In office 10 March 2020 – 16 August 2021
- Monarch: Abdullah
- Prime Minister: Muhyiddin Yassin
- Deputy: Edmund Santhara Kumar Ramanaidu
- Preceded by: Khalid Abdul Samad
- Succeeded by: Shahidan Kassim
- Constituency: Ketereh

Minister of Rural Development
- In office 1 December 1993 – 14 December 1999
- Monarchs: Azlan Shah; Ja'afar; Salahuddin
- Prime Minister: Mahathir Mohamad
- Deputy: Mohd. Yasin Kamari (1993–1994); K. Kumaran (1994–1999)
- Preceded by: Abdul Ghafar Baba
- Succeeded by: Azmi Khalid
- Constituency: Senator (1993–1995); Peringat (1995–1999)

Minister of Youth and Sports
- In office 27 October 1990 – 1 December 1993
- Monarch: Azlan Shah
- Prime Minister: Mahathir Mohamad
- Deputy: Teng Gaik Kwan
- Preceded by: Najib Razak
- Succeeded by: Abdul Ghani Othman
- Constituency: Senator

Secretary-General of the Barisan Nasional
- In office 16 March 2020 – 5 January 2021
- Chairman: Ahmad Zahid Hamidi
- Preceded by: Tengku Adnan Tengku Mansor
- Succeeded by: Ahmad Maslan

President of Kuala Lumpur City F.C.
- In office 26 February 2021 – 24 August 2022
- Succeeded by: Shahidan Kassim

President of the Football Association of Kelantan
- In office 8 November 2009 – 8 November 2016
- Preceded by: Ahmad Jazlan Yaakub
- Succeeded by: Bibi Ramjani Ilias Khan

Member of the Malaysian Parliament for Ketereh
- In office 5 May 2013 – 19 November 2022
- Preceded by: Abdul Aziz Abdul Kadir (PKR)
- Succeeded by: Khlir Mohd Nor (PN–BERSATU)
- Majority: 974 (2013); 4,626 (2018)

Member of the Malaysian Parliament for Peringat
- In office 25 April 1995 – 29 November 1999
- Preceded by: Position established
- Succeeded by: Muhamad Mustafa (PKR)
- Majority: 1,935 (1995)

Faction represented in Dewan Rakyat
- 1995–1999: Barisan Nasional
- 2013–2022: Barisan Nasional

Faction represented in Dewan Negara
- 1990–1995: Barisan Nasional

Faction represented in Kelantan State Legislative Assembly
- 1986–1990: Barisan Nasional
- 2004–2008: Barisan Nasional

Other roles
- 2004–2008: Opposition Leader of the Kelantan State Legislative Assembly

Personal details
- Born: Annuar bin Musa; 18 May 1956 (age 70) Bukit Marak, Bachok, Kelantan, Federation of Malaya (now Malaysia)
- Party: United Malays National Organisation (UMNO) (1979–2022); Independent (2022–2023); Malaysian Islamic Party (PAS) (since 2023)
- Other political affiliations: Barisan Nasional (BN) (1979–2022); Perikatan Nasional (PN) (since 2023)
- Spouse: Rosniah Abdul Rahman
- Children: 4
- Education: Tuanku Abdul Rahman School; Royal Military College
- Alma mater: Universiti Teknologi Malaysia (BSc); University College London (MSc)
- Occupation: Politician
- Annuar Musa on Parliament of Malaysia

Annuar bin Musa (Jawi: أنور بن موسى; born 18 May 1956) is a Malaysian politician who served as the Minister of Communications and Multimedia in the Barisan Nasional (BN) administration under former Prime Minister Ismail Sabri Yaakob from August 2021 to the collapse of the BN administration in November 2022, Minister of Federal Territories under former Prime Minister Muhyiddin Yassin in the Perikatan Nasional (PN) administration from March 2020 to the collapse of the PN administration in August 2021, Minister of Rural Development and Minister of Youth and Sports under former Prime Minister Mahathir Mohamad in the Barisan Nasional (BN) administration from October 1990 to December 1999 and the Member of Parliament (MP) for Ketereh from May 2013 to November 2022 and for Peringat from April 1995 to November 1999. He is a member and Member of Central Working Committee of the Malaysian Islamic Party (PAS), a component party of the PN coalition. He was an independent and member, Member of the Supreme Council, Information Chief, Division Chairman of Ketereh of the United Malays National Organisation (UMNO), a component party of the BN coalition. He also served as the Secretary-General of BN from March 2020 to January 2021. He joined UMNO in 1979 and was removed from UMNO in December 2022. He later joined PAS in March 2023. He was the president of the Kelantan FA from 2009 until November 2016. He is the current president of Kelantan The Real Warriors.

== Early life and education ==
Annuar was born in Bukit Marak, Bachok, Kelantan, Federation of Malaya. He is an alumnus of Royal Military College (RMC), Sungai Besi. Annuar has a master's degree in Construction Management from the University College London. Prior to that, he earned a bachelor's in Town and Country Planning from Universiti Teknologi Malaysia (UTM).

== Political career ==
Annuar is a member of the Malaysian Institute of Planners. He served as assistant director of Town Planning, City Hall and director, Corporate Planning Division, the State Economic Development Corporation. Although he has been politically active in Kelantan UMNO since 1979, but only significantly when he was selected first contested the Kelantan State Legislative Assembly (DUN) Peringat constituency in 1986 general election and defeated the candidate from the Pan-Malaysian Islamic Party (PAS), Daud bin Jusoh with a majority of 136 votes.

In 1990 he lost to the opposition candidate, Mohamad Sabu from PAS in Parliament stage. He won the 1995 general election in the same Parliament seat, and defeated candidate from Parti Melayu Semangat 46 (S46), Rafei Mat Salleh. Annuar again lost in the parliamentary phase of the 1999 general election, this time to Parti Keadilan Rakyat (PKR) candidate, Mohamed Mustafa.

He switched to contest the state seat again in 2004 general election and won the Kok Lanas state seat by beating Md. Ashari Mamat from PAS. He returns to contest the Ketereh federal constituency in 2008 general election but lost to PKR candidate, Abdul Aziz Kadir. However he contested the same constituency in 2013 general election and managed to win it back from the same PKR candidate. Annuar managed to retain the Ketereh seat again in 2018 general election.

In addition of contesting general elections experience, Annuar also has extensive experience in the party, including a member of the MT from 1991 to present. He also served as Chairman of the Kelantan Barisan Nasional (1994–2001) and Deputy Chairman of the State Umno Liaison Body (1991–2003). On the part he was the chief of the new Ketereh previously known as Nilam Puri and phase from 1986 to present.

== Controversies and issues ==
In 2016, Annuar's decision to quit while Kelantan FA was going through bad performances and the financial problems, was questioned by many who had likened him to "the captain abandoning his sinking ship".

Annuar embroiled himself in a rocky conflict and contentious relationship with the Crown Prince of Johor Tunku Ismail Sultan Ibrahim, another potential FAM presidency candidate; in the run-up to the FAM election in 2017. Tunku Ismail has alleged that a certain "Tan Sri", apparently was referring to Annuar, who is Majlis Amanah Rakyat (MARA) chairman had forced its entities to sponsor Kafa. In a Facebook post on 12 January 2017, Tunku Ismail has revealed photographs of documents showing sponsorship to Kafa; a RM500,000 by Universiti Kuala Lumpur (UniKL) and an additional RM200,000 by Mara Investment Berhad (PMB); both subsidiaries of MARA. On 31 January 2017, MARA announced Annuar has been suspended and asked to go on leave as MARA chairman and PMB head pending an internal investigation and audit is conducted into allegations made against him. Suspended Annuar also was quizzed by the Malaysian Anti-Corruption Commission (MACC) for four hours on 3 February 2017.

Annuar pulled out from the 2017 FAM presidency election lastly citing the reason to focus on his political obligation. He also did not renew his MARA chairman contract ended on 11 August 2017 amid still under suspension. Eventually MACC too decided not to press charges against him due to the allegations insufficient evidence.

=== Repeated violations of SOP ===
On 28 January 2021, Annuar uploaded a photo on the social media platform. The photo shows him walking in the community with the former head of Kuala Lumpur City Council Nordin Razak and Nik Aminaldin Nik Jaafar. The three people in the photo did not Keeping personal distance and not wearing a mask has aroused dissatisfaction among opposition members and netizens. On 29 January, Annuar told Malaysiakini that he and the other two elders were coincidentally meet themselves, and all three of them came out for a walk from their homes.

After attending the event on 13 February, Annuar had a meal with several officials, which once again aroused dissatisfaction among netizens, accusing him of violating SOP. Annuar uploaded a photo of the event on Facebook and wrote: "I was at the farm just now, I sat for a while and then moved away because the organizer did not follow the SOP." Later, the organizer apologized for not complying with the SOP. On 16 February, Kuala Lumpur Police Chief Saiful Azly Kamaruddin said to "Perspective Malaysia": "The Cheras police have received reports from the public and have opened investigations and will take a statement from him (Annuar) this week." On 17 February, Annuar revealed on Twitter that he had taken a confession to the police station on 16 February and explained to the police that he was accused of violating the movement restriction order at the dinner party.

On 10 July of the same year, Annuar pointed out in a social media tweet that he and his wife went to visit former Prime Minister Abdullah Badawi and his wife, and had lunch and stayed for 2 hours at Abdullah’s home. Netizens accused him of violating the law and SOP for epidemic prevention. On 12 July, the director of the Dang Wangi OCPD Asst Comm Mohamad Zainal Abdullah confirmed that the police had invoked an existing law to formally issue a fine of 2,000 ringgits to Annuar.

== Election results ==
Kelantan State Legislative Assembly
Year	Constituency	Candidate	Votes	Pct	Opponent(s)	Votes	Pct	Ballots cast	Majority	Turnout
1986	N18 Peringat	Annuar Musa (UMNO)	4,555	48.82%	Daud Jusoh @ Yusof (PAS)	4,419	47.36%	9,330	136	75.81%
2004	N25 Kok Lanas	Annuar Musa (UMNO)	8,509	57.86%	Md Ashari Mamat (PAS)	5,663	38.51%	14,707	2,846	85.16%

Parliament of Malaysia
Year	Constituency	Candidate	Votes	Pct	Opponent(s)	Votes	Pct	Ballots cast	Majority	Turnout
1990	P022 Nilam Puri	Annuar Musa (UMNO)	11,457	35.38%	Mohamad Sabu (PAS)	19,596	60.52%	32,381	8,139	80.42%
1990	P022 Nilam Puri	Annuar Musa (UMNO)	11,457	35.38%	Dr. Kamarudin (IND)	526	1.67%	32,381	8,139	80.42%
1995	P026 Peringat	Annuar Musa (UMNO)	16,725	50.02%	Rafei Matsalleh (S46)	14,790	44.23%	33,436	1,935	79.14%
1999	P026 Peringat	Annuar Musa (UMNO)	14,956	41.23%	Muhamad Mustafa (keADILan)	19,481	53.71%	36,271	4,525	80.05%
2008	P026 Ketereh	Annuar Musa (UMNO)	21,338	49.54%	Ab Aziz Ab Kadir (PKR)	21,738	50.46%	44,377	400	84.95%
2013	P026 Ketereh	Annuar Musa (UMNO)	26,912	50.92%	Ab Aziz Ab Kadir (PKR)	25,938	49.08%	53,906	974	86.64%
2018	P026 Ketereh	Annuar Musa (UMNO)	25,467	47.95%	Wan Ismail Wan Jusoh (PAS)	20,841	39.24%	53,107	4,626	83.39%
2018	P026 Ketereh	Annuar Musa (UMNO)	25,467	47.95%	Mohd Radzi Md Jidin (BERSATU)	6,799	12.80%	53,107	4,626	83.39%

== Honours ==
=== Honours of Malaysia ===
- Malaysia
  - Commander of the Order of Loyalty to the Crown of Malaysia (PSM) – Tan Sri (2008)
- Malacca
  - Grand Commander of the Exalted Order of Malacca (DGSM) – Datuk Seri (2004)
- Pahang
  - Grand Companion of the Order of the Crown of Pahang (SIMP) – formerly Dato', now Dato' Indera (1992)
- Sabah
  - Grand Commander of the Order of Kinabalu (SPDK) – Datuk Seri Panglima (2006)
