= Muhamad Mustafa =

Malaysian politician (1958-2024)

Ustaz Haji Muhamad Mustafa
- محمد مصطفى

Senator Elected by the Kelantan State Legislative Assembly
- In office 31 July 2017 – 30 July 2020 Serving with Khairiah Mohamed (2017–2018); Asmak Husin (2018–2020)
- Monarchs: Muhammad V (2017–2019); Abdullah (2019–2020)
- Prime Minister: Najib Razak (2017–2018); Mahathir Mohamad (2018–2020); Muhyiddin Yassin (2020)
- Preceded by: Johari Mat
- Succeeded by: Mohd Apandi Mohamad

Member of the Kelantan State Executive Council
- 2010–2013: Deputy Chairman of the Islamic Development, Education and Da'wah

Member of the Kelantan State Legislative Assembly for Demit
- In office 8 March 2008 – 5 May 2013
- Preceded by: Mohamed Daud (PAS)
- Succeeded by: Mumtaz Md Nawi (PR–PAS)
- Majority: 4,799 (2008)

Member of the Malaysian Parliament for Peringat
- In office 29 November 1999 – 21 March 2004
- Preceded by: Annuar Musa (BN–UMNO)
- Succeeded by: Constituency abolished
- Majority: 4,525 (1999)

Faction represented in Dewan Negara
- 2017–2020: Malaysian Islamic Party

Faction represented in the Kelantan State Legislative Assembly
- 2008–2013: Malaysian Islamic Party

Faction represented in Dewan Rakyat
- 1999–2003: National Justice Party
- 2003–2004: People's Justice Party

Personal details
- Born: Muhamad bin Mustafa; 22 August 1958 Kelantan
- Died: 9 September 2024 (aged 66) Universiti Sains Malaysia Hospital, Kelantan
- Resting place: Raudhatul Jannah Muslim Cemetery, Kampung Huda, Kubang Kerian, Kelantan
- Party: Malaysian Islamic Party (PAS); National Justice Party (KeADILan)
- Other political affiliations: Barisan Alternatif (BA) (1998–2004); Pakatan Rakyat (PR) (2008–2015); Gagasan Sejahtera (GS) (2016–2020); Perikatan Nasional (PN) (2020–2024)
- Spouse: Azizah Ishak
- Occupation: Politician
- Profession: Lecturer

Ustaz Haji Muhamad bin Mustafa was a Malaysian politician and lecturer who had served as the Member of Dewan Rakyat for Peringat from 1999 to 2004, the Member of the Kelantan State Legislative Assembly (MLA) for Demit from 2008 to 2013 and as a Senator from 2017 to 2020.

He died on 9 September 2024.

== Election results ==
Parliament of Malaysia
Year	Constituency	Candidate	Votes	Pct	Opponent(s)	Votes	Pct	Ballots cast	Majority	Turnout
1999	P026 Peringat	Muhamad Mustafa (KeADILan)	19,481	53.71%	Annuar Musa (UMNO)	14,956	41.23%	36,271	4,525	80.05%
2004	P026 Ketereh	Muhamad Mustafa (PKR)	17,136	46.11%	Md Alwi Che Ahmad (UMNO)	20,024	53.89%	38,187	2,888	82.13%

Kelantan State Legislative Assembly
Year	Constituency	Candidate	Votes	Pct	Opponent(s)	Votes	Pct	Ballots cast	Majority	Turnout
2008	N19 Demit	Muhamad Mustafa (PAS)	11,547	63.12%	Mohd Abdul Ghani (UMNO)	6,748	36.88%	18,512	4,799	83.61%

== See also ==
- Members of the Dewan Negara, 13th Malaysian Parliament
- List of people who have served in both Houses of the Malaysian Parliament
