= Syarikat Perumahan Negara Berhad =

Malaysian housing development company

Syarikat Perumahan Negara Berhad (SPNB)
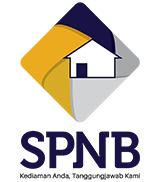
- Company type: State-owned enterprise
- Industry: Housing development
- Founded: 21 August 1997
- Headquarters: Tingkat 8, Wisma Perkeso, Jalan Tun Razak, 50400 Kuala Lumpur, Malaysia
- Key people: Husam Musa, Non-executive Chairman; Hasleen Isnin, Chief Executive Officer
- Parent: Minister of Finance Incorporated
- Website: spnb.com.my

Syarikat Perumahan Negara Berhad (National Housing Company Berhad; SPNB) is a national housing development company owned by the Malaysian Ministry of Finance Incorporated and has been established since 1997. SPNB has been under the purview of the Ministry of Housing and Local Government (KPKT) as of 3 August 2018.

== History ==
1997:
21 August 1997 - Inaugural of SPNB under Ministry of Finance (MOF).

2001:
SPNB was appointed as implementation agent for the rehabilitation of abandoned projects by Ministry of Urban Wellbeing, Housing and Local Government (KPKT). In 2012, SPNB successfully rehabilated 14,951 units of abandoned houses across the nation.

USL was formed (51% owned by SPNB), a joint venture company between SPNB and Armed Forces Fund Board (LTAT). USL is a design and built contractor whom undertook the construction of 6,550 units of army quarters in Klang Valley which were fully completed in 2008.

2002:
SPNB introduced Skim Rumah Keluarga Nelayan Terengganu. This program was designed to assist lower income earners especially fishermen to build house on their own land. Government subsidized 1/3 of the house price to ensure the price is within affordability.

The program was then changed to Rumah Mesra Rakyat (RMR - People Friendly Homes). SPNB has completed more than 40,000 RMR since then.

2004:
Agensi Pengurusan Bencana Negara - NADMA (formerly known as Majlis Keselamatan Negara) appointed SPNB as an implementation agent to provide homes for flood and tsunami victims in Kedah, Penang dan Acheh.

2005:
Program Rumah Mesra Rakyat was expanded to Sabah and Sarawak.

2008:
NADMA appointed SPNB once again to develop houses for the flood victims in Johor, Pahang, Kelantan and Sabah.

2009:
Received an endorsement from SIRIM QAS International Sdn. Bhd. for the implementation of the Quality Management System which complies with ISO 9001: 2008 - Quality Management Systems.

2012:
New design was introduced using IBS (Integrated Building System) and IBS Hybrid System.

Introduced RMR Online System for online application system.

2014:
Rumah Idaman Rakyat was introduced.

SPNB underwent business transformation process whereby new subsidiaries were established meanwhile the existing subsidiaries were strengthened:

1. SPNB Aspirasi Sdn. Bhd.
2. SPNB Idaman Sdn. Bhd.
3. SPNB Mesra Sdn. Bhd.
4. SPNB Edar Sdn. Bhd.
5. SPNB Dana Sdn. Bhd.
6. USL Sdn. Bhd.
