= Mutang Tagal =

Malaysian politician, lawyer and businessman (1954–2024)

Yang Berbahagia Datuk Mutang Tagal PJN

20th President of the Dewan Negara
- In office 19 February 2024 – 10 May 2024
- Monarch: Ibrahim Iskandar
- Prime Minister: Anwar Ibrahim
- Deputy: Nur Jazlan Mohamed
- Preceded by: Wan Junaidi Tuanku Jaafar
- Succeeded by: Awang Bemee Awang Ali Basah

Senator (Appointed by the Yang di-Pertuan Agong)
- In office 15 February 2024 – 10 May 2024
- Monarch: Ibrahim Iskandar
- Prime Minister: Anwar Ibrahim

Member of the Malaysian Parliament for Bukit Mas
- In office 26 April 1982 – 21 October 1990
- Preceded by: Racha Umong (BN–PBB)
- Majority: Walkover (1982); 5,863 (1986)

Personal details
- Born: Mutang Tagal; 5 October 1954 Buduk Nur, Ba'kelalan, Lawas, Crown Colony of Sarawak (now Sarawak, Malaysia)
- Died: 10 May 2024 (aged 69) Kuala Lumpur, Malaysia
- Resting place: Fairy Park Memorial Park, Bintulu-Miri Road, Lambir, Miri, Sarawak
- Citizenship: Malaysian
- Party: Parti Pesaka Bumiputera Bersatu (PBB) (–2024)
- Other political affiliations: Barisan Nasional (BN) (–2018); Gabungan Parti Sarawak (GPS) (2018–2024)
- Spouse: Ho May Leng
- Relations: Judson Sakai Tagal (elder brother)
- Children: 3
- Parent(s): Tagal Paran (father), Yamu Pengiran (mother)
- Education: Bachelors of Law
- Alma mater: University of Malaya (LLB); Curtin University Malaysia (MBA)
- Occupation: Politician; businessman
- Profession: Lawyer

Datuk Mutang Tagal (5 October 1954 – 10 May 2024) was a Malaysian lawyer, businessman, and politician. He was a Member of Parliament (MP) for Bukit Mas in the state of Sarawak, Malaysia from April 1982 to October 1990. He left active politics from 1990 until his surprise appointment as the 20th President of the Dewan Negara and Senator from February 2024 to his death in office in May 2024. Mutang Tagal was the first Orang Ulu and indigenous Sarawakian president of the Senate (Dewan Negara) in the history of Malaysia.

He was an ethnic Lun Bawang, growing up in Ba'Kelalan, Sarawak to Christian missionary pastor parents, Tagal Paran (father) and Yamu Pengiran (mother). He grew up during the Christian revival era that occurred in the 1970s among the Lun Bawangs in Sarawak, making an impact on his lifelong journey of faith as a Christian. He was also the younger brother of former State Assistant Minister of Communications of Sarawak and former Member of the Sarawak State Legislative Assembly (MLA) for Ba'kelalan Judson Sakai Tagal who died in a helicopter crash during an official government work trip with 6 others in July 2004.

As an advocate for legal justice, Mutang served as a Commissioner for Oaths and Notary Public, and contributed to private law practice. He worked with firms such as Mutang and Sam Advocates and Solicitors in Miri; Khaled, Mutang, Chan & Lim in Kuala Lumpur; and Mutang, Bojeng & Chai Advocates & Solicitors in Kuching.

He also served as Vice President of the Sarawak Business Federation (SBF) and hold advisory positions with the Semaring Group of Companies. His dedication to business and commerce extends further as President of the Orang Ulu Chamber of Commerce & Industry (OUCCI) and Vice President of the Dayak Chamber of Commerce & Industry (DCCI).

He was also a Patron of the Lawas Shooting and Archery Association (LSAA), Advisor to the Northern Sarawak Journalists Association (NSJA), Legal Advisor to the Sarawak Lun Bawang Association, Member of the Sarawak Advocates Association, Member of the Sabah Advocates Association, Member of the Malaysian Bar Council, and was an honorary consul of Romania in Sarawak from January 2017 until his appointment as the President of the Senate in February 2024.

He was a Member of the Supreme Council of the Parti Pesaka Bumiputera Bersatu (PBB), a component party of the Gabungan Parti Sarawak (GPS) and formerly Barisan Nasional (BN) coalitions.

== Hobbies ==
During his spare time, he enjoyed golf and brisk walking alongside Miri's coast with his wife.

== Political career ==
=== Member of Parliament (1982–1990) ===
==== 1982 general election ====
In the 1982 general election, Mutang made his electoral debut after being nominated by BN to contest for the Bukit Mas federal seat. He won the seat and was elected to the Parliament as the Bukit Mas MP for the first term in a walkover.

==== 1986 general election ====
In the 1986 general election, Mutang was renominated by BN to defend the Bukit Mas seat. He defended the seat and was reelected to the Parliament as the Bukit Mas MP for the second term after defeating independent candidate Mohd Bujang Mohd Yassin by a majority of 5,863 votes.

=== President of the Dewan Negara and Senator (2024) ===
On 15 February 2024, Mutang Tagal was appointed to the Parliament as a Senator. On 19 February 2024, he was appointed 20th President of the Dewan Negara, replacing Wan Junaidi Tuanku Jaafar who was appointed the 8th Yang di-Pertua Negeri of Sarawak.

== Sudden illness and death ==
On 29 April 2024, Mutang was on a working visit to Baku, Azerbaijan, where he led the Malaysian delegation to the World Forum on Intercultural Dialogue from 1 to 3 May 2024. During his visit, he was the only delegate accorded the honor of meeting Ilham Aliyev, the President of the Republic of Azerbaijan, expanding on bilateral relations between Malaysia and Azerbaijan. However, Mutang had to cut his official working trip short due to a sudden illness that came about during a work tour in Azerbaijan, causing him to return early to Malaysia. Upon reaching Malaysia on 6 May 2024, he was admitted to the National Heart Institute (IJN) in Kuala Lumpur for medical care. He died four days later on 10 May 2024, at the age of 69.

The King and Queen of Malaysia, Prime Minister of Malaysia described Mutang's death as a loss to the state of Sarawak, as well as to the nation. Thousands bid farewell to Mutang during his wake and funeral services in Kuala Lumpur and Miri. After heartfelt eulogies from his wife, children, father, and sister, Mutang Tagal was laid to rest in Miri, Sarawak, where he had lived with his family for many decades.

== Election results ==
Parliament of Malaysia
| Year | Constituency | Candidate | Votes | Pct | Opponent(s) | Votes | Pct | Ballots cast | Majority | Turnout |
|---|---|---|---|---|---|---|---|---|---|---|
| 1982 | P154 Bukit Mas | Mutang Tagal (PBB) | Walkover | | | | | | | |
| 1986 | P154 Bukit Mas | Mutang Tagal (PBB) | 9,470 | 72.42% | Mohd Bujang Mohd Yassin (IND) | 3,607 | 27.58% | 13,077 | 5,863 | 57.78% |

== Honours ==
- Malaysia
  - Commander of the Order of Meritorious Service (PJN) – Datuk (2017)
