= Mersing (federal constituency) =

Federal constituency in Johor, Malaysia

Mersing (P154)
Johor constituency

Federal constituency
- Legislature: Dewan Rakyat
- MP: Muhammad Islahuddin Abas; PN
- Constituency created: 1984
- First contested: 1986
- Last contested: 2022

Demographics
- Population (2020): 78,195
- Electors (2026): 67,768
- Area (km²): 2,875
- Pop. density (per km²): 27.2

Mersing is a federal constituency in Mersing District, Johor, Malaysia, that has been represented in the Dewan Rakyat since 1986.

The federal constituency was created in the 1984 redistribution and is mandated to return a single member to the Dewan Rakyat under the first past the post voting system.

== Demographics ==
Ethnic breakdown of Mersing's electorate as of 2022
1. Malay (83.0%)
2. Chinese (13.9%)
3. Other ethnicities (1.90%)
4. Indian (1.30%)

As of 2020, Mersing has a population of 78,195 people.

Age breakdown of Mersing's electorate as of 2022
1. 18-20 (5.47%)
2. 21-29 (20.8%)
3. 30-39 (27.6%)
4. 40-49 (16.3%)
5. 50-59 (11.4%)
6. 60-69 (11.9%)
7. 70-79 (5.00%)
8. 80-89 (1.25%)
9. above 90 (0.33%)
Gender breakdown of Mersing's electorate as of 2022
1. Male (50.5%)
2. Female (49.5%)

== History ==
=== Polling districts ===
According to the gazette issued on 2 July 2026, the Mersing constituency has a total of 44 polling districts.

State constituency	Polling districts	Code	Location
Endau（N32）	Padang Endau	154/32/01	SMK Ungku Husin; SK Pusat Air Tawar
Endau（N32）	Bandar Endau Utara	154/32/02	SK Bandar Endau
Endau（N32）	Bandar Endau Selatan	154/32/03	SA Bandar Endau
Endau（N32）	Kampung Hubong	154/32/04	SK Pusat Air Tawar; SK Labong
Endau（N32）	Kampung Hubong Barat	154/32/05	SJK (C) Kg Hubong
Endau（N32）	Rancangan FELDA Endau	154/32/06	SK Lembaga Endau
Endau（N32）	Triang	154/32/07	SK Teriang
Endau（N32）	Penyabong	154/32/08	SK Penyabong
Endau（N32）	Tanjong Resang	154/32/09	SK Tanjung Resang
Endau（N32）	Ayer Papan	154/32/10	SK Air Papan
Endau（N32）	Tanjong Genting	154/32/11	Balai Raya Kg. Tanjung Genting
Endau（N32）	Mersing Kanan	154/32/12	SRA Bersepadu Mersing
Endau（N32）	Jalan Endau	154/32/13	SMK Mersing
Endau（N32）	Jalan Abdullah	154/32/14	SA Mersing Kanan
Endau（N32）	Kampong Tengah	154/32/15	SK Mersing Kanan
Endau（N32）	Sawah Dato'	154/32/16	SK Sawah Dato'
Endau（N32）	Tenglu	154/32/17	SK Tenglu
Endau（N32）	Tanah Abang	154/32/18	SK Tanah Abang
Endau（N32）	Kampong Punan	154/32/19	SK Punan
Endau（N32）	Kampong Peta	154/32/20	SK Peta
Tenggaroh（N33）	Bandar Utara	154/33/01	SA Bukit Timbalan
Tenggaroh（N33）	Jalan Jamaluang	154/33/02	SMK Sri Mersing
Tenggaroh（N33）	FELDA Nitar 2	154/33/03	SK LKTP Nitar 2
Tenggaroh（N33）	FELDA Nitar 1	154/33/04	SK LKTP Nitar 1
Tenggaroh（N33）	Pengkalan Batu	154/33/05	SA Pengkalan Batu
Tenggaroh（N33）	Jalan Ismail	154/33/06	SJK (C) Pai Chee
Tenggaroh（N33）	Pejabat Kerajaan	154/33/07	SK Bandar Mersing
Tenggaroh（N33）	Pekan Mersing Kechil	154/33/08	SK Sri Mersing
Tenggaroh（N33）	Sri Pantai	154/33/09	SK Seri Pantai
Tenggaroh（N33）	Bandar Jamaluang Timor	154/33/10	Dewan Seberguna Kampung Baru Jemaluang
Tenggaroh（N33）	Jamaluang Timor	154/33/11	SK (FELDA) Tenggaroh 5
Tenggaroh（N33）	Jamaluang	154/33/12	SJK (C) Jemaluang
Tenggaroh（N33）	RISDA Sungai Ambat	154/33/13	Balai Raya Kg. Baru Estet Koperasi Sg. Ambat
Tenggaroh（N33）	FELDA Tenggaroh 5	154/33/14	SMK Tan Sri Abdul Kadir
Tenggaroh（N33）	FELDA Tenggaroh 3	154/33/15	SK (FELDA) Tenggaroh 3
Tenggaroh（N33）	FELDA Tenggaroh 6	154/33/16	SK (FELDA) Tenggaroh 6
Tenggaroh（N33）	FELDA Tenggaroh 4	154/33/17	SK (FELDA) Tenggaroh 4
Tenggaroh（N33）	FELDA Tenggaroh 2	154/33/18	SK (FELDA) Tenggaroh 2
Tenggaroh（N33）	FELDA Tenggaroh 1	154/33/19	SK (FELDA) Tenggaroh 1
Tenggaroh（N33）	Pulau Sibu	154/33/20	Balai Raya Pulau Sibu
Tenggaroh（N33）	Pulau Tinggi	154/33/21	SK Pulau Tinggi
Tenggaroh（N33）	Pulau Besar	154/33/22	Balai Raya Pulau Besar
Tenggaroh（N33）	Pulau Aur	154/33/23	Balai Raya Pulau Aur
Tenggaroh（N33）	Pulau Pemanggil	154/33/24	SK Pulau Pemanggil

=== Representation history ===
Members of Parliament for Mersing
Parliament	No	Years	Member	Party	Vote Share
Constituency created, renamed from Tenggaroh
7th	P119	1986–1990	Abdul Ajib Ahmad (عبدالعجيب أحمد)	BN (UMNO)	14,419; 80.29%
8th	P119	1990–1995	Abdul Ajib Ahmad (عبدالعجيب أحمد)	BN (UMNO)	14,366; 59.31%
9th	P129	1995–1999	Zainal Abidin Osman (زَيْنَ ٱلعَابِدِين عُثْمَان)	BN (UMNO)	19,357; 76.85%
10th	P129	1999–2004	Abdul Latiff Ahmad (عَبْدُٱلْلَطِيف أَحْمَد)	BN (UMNO)	18,821; 70.28%
11th	P154	2004–2008	Abdul Latiff Ahmad (عَبْدُٱلْلَطِيف أَحْمَد)	BN (UMNO)	19,222; 80.52%
12th	P154	2008–2013	Abdul Latiff Ahmad (عَبْدُٱلْلَطِيف أَحْمَد)	BN (UMNO)	20,116; 75.92%
13th	P154	2013–2018	Abdul Latiff Ahmad (عَبْدُٱلْلَطِيف أَحْمَد)	BN (UMNO)	26,184; 71.50%
14th	P154	2018	Abdul Latiff Ahmad (عَبْدُٱلْلَطِيف أَحْمَد)	BN (UMNO)	19,806; 53.00%
14th	P154	2018–2019	Abdul Latiff Ahmad (عَبْدُٱلْلَطِيف أَحْمَد)	Independent	19,806; 53.00%
14th	P154	2019–2020	Abdul Latiff Ahmad (عَبْدُٱلْلَطِيف أَحْمَد)	PH (BERSATU)	19,806; 53.00%
14th	P154	2020–2022	Abdul Latiff Ahmad (عَبْدُٱلْلَطِيف أَحْمَد)	PN (BERSATU)	19,806; 53.00%
15th	P154	2022–present	Muhammad Islahuddin Abas (مُحَمَّد إِصْلَاحُ ٱلدِّين عَبَاس)	PN (BERSATU)	21,066; 44.91%

=== State constituency ===
Parliamentary constituency	State constituency						
Parliamentary constituency	1954–59*	1959–1974	1974–1986	1986–1995	1995–2004	2004–2018	2018–present
Mersing				Endau			
Mersing				Tenggaroh			

=== Historical boundaries ===
State Constituency	Area			
State Constituency	1984	1994	2003	2018
Endau	Air Papan; Endau; Mersing; Pulau Setindan; Tenglu		Air Papan; Endau; Pulau Setindan; Taman Air Merah Makmur; Tenglu	
Tenggaroh	FELDA Nitar; FELDA Tenggaroh; Jemaluang; Kahang; Kepulauan Mersing		FELDA Nitar; FELDA Tenggaroh; Jemaluang; Kepulauan Mersing; Mersing	

=== Current state assembly members ===
No.	State Constituency	Member	Coalition (Party)
N32	Endau	Alwiyah Talib	BN (UMNO)
N33	Tenggaroh	Mohd Youzaimi Yusof	BN (UMNO)

=== Local governments & postcodes ===
No.	State Constituency	Local Government	
N32	Endau	Mersing District Council	86700 Kahang; 86800, 86810 Mersing; 86900 Endau
N33	Tenggaroh	Mersing District Council	86700 Kahang; 86800, 86810 Mersing; 86900 Endau

== Election results ==
Malaysian general election, 2022
Party	Candidate	Votes	%	∆%
PN	Muhammad Islahuddin Abas	21,066	44.91	▲44.91
BN	Abdul Latif Bandi @ Nor Sebandi	18,729	39.93	▼13.07
PH	Fatin Zulaikha Zaidi	6,813	14.52	▲14.52
PEJUANG	Nurfatimah Ibrahim	209	0.45	▲0.45
Independent	Ismail Don	89	0.19	▲0.19
Total valid votes		46,906	100.00	
Total rejected ballots		388		
Unreturned ballots		175		
Turnout		47,469	70.77	▼8.74
Registered electors		66,275		
Majority		2,337	4.98	▼17.65
PN gain from BN		Swing		?
Source(s) https://lom.agc.gov.my/ilims/upload/portal/akta/outputp/1753254/PUB%20617%20PARLIMEN%20JOHOR.pdf

Malaysian general election, 2018
Party	Candidate	Votes	%	∆%
BN	Abdul Latiff Ahmad	19,806	53.00	▼18.50
PKR	Md. Nasir Hashim	11,347	30.37	▲30.37
PAS	A. Rahman A. Hamid	6,215	16.63	▼11.87
Total valid votes		37,368	100.00	
Total rejected ballots		796		
Unreturned ballots		142		
Turnout		38,306	79.51	▼4.52
Registered electors		48,176		
Majority		8,459	22.63	▼20.37
BN hold		Swing		
Source(s) "His Majesty's Government Gazette - Notice of Contested Election, Parliament for the State of Johore [P.U. (B) 244/2018]" (PDF). Attorney General's Chambers of Malaysia. 3 May 2018. Archived from the original (PDF) on December 29, 2019. "Federal Government Gazette - Results of Contested Election and Statements of the Poll after the Official Addition of Votes, Parliamentary Constituencies for the State of Johore [P.U. (B) 318/2018]" (PDF). Attorney General's Chambers of Malaysia. 28 May 2018.

Malaysian general election, 2013
Party	Candidate	Votes	%	∆%
BN	Abdul Latiff Ahmad	26,184	71.50	▼4.42
PAS	Roslan Nikmat	10,437	28.50	▲4.42
Total valid votes		36,621	100.00	
Total rejected ballots		678		
Unreturned ballots		94		
Turnout		37,393	84.03	▲8.44
Registered electors		44,497		
Majority		15,747	43.00	▼8.84
BN hold		Swing		
Source(s) "Federal Government Gazette - Notice of Contested Election, Parliament for the State of Johore [P.U. (B) 181/2013]" (PDF). Attorney General's Chambers of Malaysia. 26 April 2013. "Federal Government Gazette - Results of Contested Election and Statements of the Poll after the Official Addition of Votes, Parliamentary Constituencies for the State of Johore [P.U. (B) 222/2013]" (PDF). Attorney General's Chambers of Malaysia. 22 May 2013.

Malaysian general election, 2008
Party	Candidate	Votes	%	∆%
BN	Abdul Latiff Ahmad	20,116	75.92	▼4.60
PAS	Shahar Abdullah	6,380	24.08	▲4.60
Total valid votes		26,496	100.00	
Total rejected ballots		857		
Unreturned ballots		195		
Turnout		27,548	75.59	▲3.34
Registered electors		36,445		
Majority		13,736	51.84	▼9.20
BN hold		Swing		

Malaysian general election, 2004
Party	Candidate	Votes	%	∆%
BN	Abdul Latiff Ahmad	19,222	80.52	▲10.24
PAS	Idris Tukachil	4,649	19.48	▼10.24
Total valid votes		23,871	100.00	
Total rejected ballots		613		
Unreturned ballots		0		
Turnout		24,484	72.25	▲1.96
Registered electors		33,890		
Majority		14,573	61.04	▲20.48
BN hold		Swing		

Malaysian general election, 1999
Party	Candidate	Votes	%	∆%
BN	Abdul Latiff Ahmad	18,821	70.28	▼6.57
PAS	Idris Tukachil	7,960	29.72	▲29.72
Total valid votes		26,781	100.00	
Total rejected ballots		782		
Unreturned ballots		54		
Turnout		27,617	70.29	▼0.18
Registered electors		39,286		
Majority		10,861	40.56	▼13.14
BN hold		Swing		

Malaysian general election, 1995
Party	Candidate	Votes	%	∆%
BN	Zainal Abidin Osman	19,357	76.85	▲17.54
S46	A. Kadir Johan	5,832	23.15	▼17.54
Total valid votes		25,189	100.00	
Total rejected ballots		1,369		
Unreturned ballots		66		
Turnout		26,624	70.47	▼2.19
Registered electors		37,782		
Majority		13,525	53.70	▲35.08
BN hold		Swing		

Malaysian general election, 1990
Party	Candidate	Votes	%	∆%
BN	Abdul Ajib Ahmad	14,366	59.31	▼20.98
S46	Hassan Md. Ali	9,857	40.69	▲40.69
Total valid votes		24,223	100.00	
Total rejected ballots		858		
Unreturned ballots		0		
Turnout		25,081	72.66	▲5.25
Registered electors		34,517		
Majority		4,509	18.62	▼41.96
BN hold		Swing		

Malaysian general election, 1986
Party	Candidate	Votes	%
BN	Abdul Ajib Ahmad	14,419	80.29
PAS	Mokhtar Yahaya	3,540	19.71
Total valid votes		17,959	100.00
Total rejected ballots		1,106	
Unreturned ballots		0	
Turnout		19,065	67.41
Registered electors		28,281	
Majority		10,879	60.58
This was a new constituency created.
