= Bukit Marak =

Coordinates: 6.037883°N 102.316103°E

Bukit Marak (literally Shining Hill) is a village in Bachok District, Kelantan, Malaysia, located about 24 kilometres (15 mi) south of the state capital Kota Bharu. It is famous as the childhood home of Puteri Saadong, and thus has great significance in the history of the Sultanate of Kelantan.

The village derives its name from a local hill, one of the last hillocks in the district. The hill has some attractions for tourists, and draws thousands of visitors every weekend both for hiking and for sightseeing. Among these are a famous pool in which Puteri Saadong was believed to have bathed, and three granite rocks at the peak of the hill resembling Puteri Saadong's favourite musical instrument. However, the hill is being negatively affected by excavation of soil for use in land reclamation; local villagers are said to be selling soil from the hill at RM40 for one lorry-load. Aside from the damage to the historical site, this also may introduce the danger of mudslides and landslides during the monsoon season. The state government has offered to purchase the hill from its owners in accordance with the National Heritage Act 2005, in order to prevent further damage.
