= Bukit Mas =

Sarawak constituency

Defunct federal constituency
- Legislature: Dewan Rakyat
- Constituency created: 1977
- Constituency abolished: 2008
- First contested: 1978
- Last contested: 2004

Bukit Mas was a federal constituency in Sarawak, Malaysia, that was represented in the Dewan Rakyat from 1978 to 2008.

The federal constituency was created in the 1977 redistribution and was mandated to return a single member to the Dewan Rakyat under the first past the post voting system.

== History ==
It was abolished in 2008 when it was redistributed.

=== Representation history ===
Members of Parliament for Bukit Mas
Parliament	No	Years	Member	Party	Vote Share
Constituency created, renamed from Limbang-Lawas
5th	P154	1978-1982	Racha Umong	BN (PBB)	Uncontested
6th	P154	1982-1986	Mutang Tagal	BN (PBB)	Uncontested
7th	P177	1986-1990	Mutang Tagal	BN (PBB)	9,470; 72.42%
8th	P180	1990-1995	Michael Lisa Kaya	BN (PBB)	10,057; 57.35%
9th	P192	1995-1999	Michael Lisa Kaya	BN (PBB)	12,891; 70.01%
10th	P193	1999-2004	Henry Sum Agong	BN (PBB)	13,642; 79.24%
11th	P219	2004-2008	Henry Sum Agong	BN (PBB)	Uncontested
Constituency abolished, split into Limbang and Lawas

=== State constituency ===
Parliamentary constituency	State constituency					
Parliamentary constituency	1969–1978	1978–1990	1990–1999	1999–2008	2008–2016	2016−present
Bukit Mas				Ba'kelalan		
Bukit Mas		Lawas				
Bukit Mas		Limbang				

=== Historical boundaries ===
State Constituency	Area		
State Constituency	1977	1987	1996
Ba'kelalan			Bario; Ba'kelalan; Kuala Mendalam; Long Semado; Long Sukang
Lawas	Ba'kelalan; Long Sukang; Merapok; Sundar; Terusan		Lawas; Merapok; Punang; Sundar; Terusan
Limbang	Batu Danau; Lubai; Nanga Medamit; Padanaruan; Sebukang		Batu Danau; Sebukang; Limbang; Nanga Medamit; Padanaruan

== Election results ==
Malaysian general election, 2004: Bukit Mas
Party	Candidate	Votes	%	∆%
On the nomination day, Henry Sum Agong won uncontested.
BN	Henry Sum Agong			
Total valid votes			100.00	
Total rejected ballots				
Unreturned ballots				
Turnout				
Registered electors		35,865		
Majority				
BN hold		Swing		

Malaysian general election, 1999: Bukit Mas
Party	Candidate	Votes	%	∆%
BN	Henry Sum Agong	13,642	79.24	▲9.23
PKR	Charlee Soh Cheng Hiong	3,116	18.10	▲18.10
Independent	Mohamad Brahim	459	2.67	▲2.67
Total valid votes		17,217	100.00	
Total rejected ballots		237		
Unreturned ballots		184		
Turnout		17,638	51.53	▼8.36
Registered electors		34,226		
Majority		10,526	61.14	▲21.12
BN hold		Swing		

Malaysian general election, 1995: Bukit Mas
Party	Candidate	Votes	%	∆%
BN	Michael Lisa Kaya	12,891	70.01	▲12.66
Independent	Baru Sigar	5,522	29.99	▲29.99
Total valid votes		18,413	100.00	
Total rejected ballots		344		
Unreturned ballots		146		
Turnout		18,903	59.89	▼4.57
Registered electors		31,563		
Majority		7,369	40.02	▲23.64
BN hold		Swing		

Malaysian general election, 1990: Bukit Mas
Party	Candidate	Votes	%	∆%
BN	Michael Lisa Kaya	10,057	57.35	▼15.07
Independent	Munir Karim	7,185	40.97	▲40.97
Independent	Ibrahim Abdullah	294	1.68	▲1.68
Total valid votes		17,536	100.00	
Total rejected ballots		281		
Unreturned ballots		0		
Turnout		17,817	64.46	▲6.68
Registered electors		27,641		
Majority		2,872	16.38	▼28.46
BN hold		Swing		

Malaysian general election, 1986: Bukit Mas
Party	Candidate	Votes	%	∆%
BN	Mutang Tagal	9,470	72.42	▲72.42
Independent	Mohd Bujang Mohd Yassin	3,607	27.58	▲27.58
Total valid votes		13,077	100.00	
Total rejected ballots		411		
Unreturned ballots		0		
Turnout		13,488	57.78	
Registered electors		23,345		
Majority		5,863	44.84	
BN hold		Swing		

Malaysian general election, 1982: Bukit Mas
Party	Candidate	Votes	%	∆%
On the nomination day, Mutang Tagal won uncontested.
BN	Mutang Tagal			
Total valid votes			100.00	
Total rejected ballots				
Unreturned ballots				
Turnout				
Registered electors		18,356		
Majority				
BN hold		Swing		

Malaysian general election, 1978: Bukit Mas
Party	Candidate	Votes	%
On the nomination day, Racha Umong won uncontested.
BN	Racha Umong		
Total valid votes			100.00
Total rejected ballots			
Unreturned ballots			
Turnout			
Registered electors		15,726	
Majority			
This was a new constituency created.
