= Peringat =

Constituency in Malaysia

Kelantan constituency

Defunct federal constituency
- Legislature: Dewan Rakyat
- Constituency created: 1994
- Constituency abolished: 2004
- First contested: 1995
- Last contested: 1999

Peringat was a federal constituency in Kelantan, Malaysia, that was represented in the Dewan Rakyat from 1995 to 2004.

The federal constituency was created in the 1994 redistribution and was mandated to return a single member to the Dewan Rakyat under the first past the post voting system.

== History ==
It was abolished in 2004 when it was redistributed.

=== Representation history ===
Members of Parliament for Peringat
Parliament	No	Years	Member	Party	Vote Share
Constituency created from Kok Lanas and Nilam Puri
9th	P026	1995–1999	Annuar Musa (أنور موسى)	BN (UMNO)	16,725; 53.07%
10th	P026	1999–2004	Muhamad Mustafa (محمد بن مصطفى)	BA (keADILan)	19,481; 56.57%
Constituency abolished, split into Ketereh and Kubang Kerian

=== State constituency ===
Parliamentary constituency	State constituency						
Parliamentary constituency	1955–1959*	1959–1974	1974–1986	1986–1995	1995–2004	2004–2018	2018–present
Peringat					Kadok		
Peringat					Ketereh		
Peringat					Melor		

=== Historical boundaries ===
State Constituency	Area
State Constituency	1994
Kadok	Dewan Beta; Kampung Kedai Piah; Kampung Perol; Kadok; Nilam Puri
Ketereh	Kampung Banggol Pauh; Kampung Buloh Poh; Kampung Kemubu; Ketereh; Kok Lanas
Melor	Kampung Padang Murah; Melor; Peringat; Padang Lengkuas; Pauh Lima

== Election results ==
Malaysian general election, 1999: Peringat
Party	Candidate	Votes	%	∆%
PKR	Muhammad Mustafa	19,481	56.57	▲56.57
BN	Annuar Musa	14,956	43.43	▲9.64
Total valid votes		34,437	100.00	
Total rejected ballots		726		
Unreturned ballots		1,108		
Turnout		36,271	80.05	▲0.91
Registered electors		45,310		
Majority		4,525	13.14	▲7.00
PKR gain from BN		Swing		?

Malaysian general election, 1995: Peringat
Party	Candidate	Votes	%
BN	Annuar Musa	16,725	53.07
S46	Rafei Mat Salleh	14,790	46.93
Total valid votes		31,515	100.00
Total rejected ballots		1,621	
Unreturned ballots		300	
Turnout		33,436	79.14
Registered electors		42,248	
Majority		1,935	6.14
This was a new constituency created.
