= Nilam Puri =

Kelantan constituency

Defunct federal constituency
- Legislature: Dewan Rakyat
- Constituency created: 1974
- Constituency abolished: 1995
- First contested: 1974
- Last contested: 1990

Nilam Puri was a federal constituency in Kelantan, Malaysia, that was represented in the Dewan Rakyat from 1974 to 1995.

The federal constituency was created in the 1974 redistribution and was mandated to return a single member to the Dewan Rakyat under the first past the post voting system.

== History ==
It was abolished in 1995 when it was redistributed.

=== Representation history ===
Members of Parliament for Nilam Puri
Parliament	No	Years	Member	Party	Vote Share
Constituency created, renamed from Kota Bharu Hulu
4th	P022	1974–1978	Mohamad Asri Muda (محمد عصري مودا)	BN (PAS)	15,736; 78.11%
5th	P022	1978–1982	Mohamed Ali (محمد علي)	BN (UMNO)	13,031; 54.51%
6th	P022	1982–1986	Mohamed Ali (محمد علي)	BN (UMNO)	15,029; 51.97%
7th	P022	1986–1990	Mohamed Ali (محمد علي)	BN (UMNO)	12,911; 51.09%
8th	P022	1990–1995	Mohamad Sabu (محمد سابو)	PAS	19,596; 62.05%
Constituency abolished, split into Peringat and Kubang Kerian

=== State constituency ===
Parliamentary constituency	State constituency						
Parliamentary constituency	1955–1959*	1959–1974	1974–1986	1986–1995	1995–2004	2004–2018	2018–present
Nilam Puri			Ketereh				
Nilam Puri				Mulong			
Nilam Puri			Peringat				
Nilam Puri			Salor				

=== Historical boundaries ===
State Constituency	Area	
State Constituency	1974	1984
Ketereh	Kampung Chengal; Kampung Sokor; Ketereh; Kok Lanas; Pangkal Kalong	
Mulong		Kadok; Kampung Nilam Puri; Kampung Perol; Kedai Mulong; Pasir Tumboh
Peringat	Melor; Padang Lengkuas; Padang Mokkan; Pangkal Pisang; Peringat	Gong Dermin; Melor; Padang Mokkan; Pangkal Pisang; Peringat
Salor	Dewan Beta; Kedai Mulong; Kubang Macang; Seribong; Tunjung	Dewan Beta; Kubang Macang; Salor; Seribong; Tunjung

== Election results ==
Malaysian general election, 1990: Nilam Puri
Party	Candidate	Votes	%	∆%
PAS	Mohamad Sabu	19,596	62.05	▲13.18
BN	Annuar Musa	11,457	36.28	▼14.81
Independent	Kamarudin Kuzi	526	1.67	▲1.67
Total valid votes		31,579	100.00	
Total rejected ballots		802		
Unreturned ballots		0		
Turnout		32,381	80.42	▲3.93
Registered electors		40,265		
Majority		8,139	25.77	▲23.59
PAS gain from BN		Swing		?

Malaysian general election, 1986: Nilam Puri
Party	Candidate	Votes	%	∆%
BN	Mohamed Ali	12,911	51.09	▼0.88
PAS	Wan Daud Wan Jusoh	12,359	48.91	▲0.88
Total valid votes		25,270	100.00	
Total rejected ballots		729		
Unreturned ballots		0		
Turnout		25,999	76.49	▼6.06
Registered electors		33,990		
Majority		552	2.18	▼1.76
BN hold		Swing		

Malaysian general election, 1982: Nilam Puri
Party	Candidate	Votes	%	∆%
BN	Mohamed Ali	15,029	51.97	▼2.54
PAS	Mohamad Asri Muda	13,890	48.03	▲2.54
Total valid votes		28,919	100.00	
Total rejected ballots		764		
Unreturned ballots		0		
Turnout		29,683	82.55	▲4.29
Registered electors		35,958		
Majority		1,139	3.94	▼5.08
BN hold		Swing		

Malaysian general election, 1978: Nilam Puri
Party	Candidate	Votes	%	∆%
BN	Mohamed Ali	13,031	54.51	▼23.60
PAS	Mustapha Ibrahim	10,874	45.49	▲45.49
Total valid votes		23,905	100.00	
Total rejected ballots		0		
Unreturned ballots		173		
Turnout		24,078	78.26	▲3.73
Registered electors		30,765		
Majority		2,157	9.02	▼47.20
BN hold		Swing		

Malaysian general election, 1974: Nilam Puri
Party	Candidate	Votes	%
BN	Mohamad Asri Muda	15,736	78.11
Independent	Zainab @ Esah Abdullah	4,409	21.89
Total valid votes		20,145	100.00
Total rejected ballots		1,116	
Unreturned ballots		0	
Turnout		21,261	74.53
Registered electors		30,116	
Majority		11,327	56.22
This was a new constituency created.
