= Members of the Dewan Negara, 5th Malaysian Parliament =

5th Parliament of Malaysia
←	4th Parliament	6th Parliament	→

Overview
- Legislative body: Parliament of Malaysia
- Jurisdiction: Malaysia
- Meeting place: Malaysian Houses of Parliament
- Term: 31 July 1978 – 29 March 1982
- Election: Indirect election and appointments
- Website: www.parlimen.gov.my

Dewan Negara
- Members: 58 (until 31 December 1978); 68
- President: Omar Yoke Lin Ong (until 31 December 1980); Ismail Khan
- Deputy President: S. O. K. Ubaidulla (until 31 December 1980); Abdul Hamid Bidin
- Secretary: Ahmad Hasmuni Hussein
- Party control: Barisan Nasional

Sovereign
- Yang di-Pertuan Agong: Tuanku Yahya Petra (until 29 March 1979); Tuanku Ahmad Shah

Sessions
- 1st: 9 October 1978 – 18 January 1980
- 2nd: 17 March 1980 – 9 January 1981
- 3rd: 16 March 1981 – 18 January 1982
- 4th: 8 March 1982 – 26 March 1982

This is a list of the members of the Dewan Negara (Senate) of the Fifth Parliament of Malaysia.

== Elected by the State Legislative Assembly ==
Senator	Party	State	Term start	Term end
Abdul Hamid Tahir	BN (UMNO)	Kedah	15 December 1980	14 December 1983
Abdullah Salleh	BN (UMNO)	Perlis	9 October 1978	8 October 1981
Ahmad Arshad	BN (UMNO)	Johore	6 January 1975	5 January 1978
Chin Kim Yoong	BN (MCA)	Perak	22 June 1981	21 June 1984
Chong Foo Khin	BN (MCA)	Negri Sembilan	22 October 1968	21 October 1971
Chong Foo Khin	BN (MCA)	Negri Sembilan	6 January 1975	5 January 1978
Chua Ching Cheng	BN (MCA)	Malacca	2 August 1971	1 August 1974
Chua Ching Cheng	BN (MCA)	Malacca	6 January 1975	5 January 1978
Chua Song Lim	BN (MCA)	Johore	17 April 1978	16 April 1981
Fadzil Ahmad	BN (UMNO)	Kedah	23 October 1978	22 October 1981
Fadzil Mahmood	BN (UMNO)	Perlis	9 December 1981	8 December 1984
Gan Kong Seng	BN (MCA)	Negri Sembilan	22 June 1981	21 June 1984
Hasnah Fatimah Mohd Kasim	BN (UMNO)	Trengganu		
Ibrahim Abdullah	BN (UMNO)	Perak	9 November 1977	8 November 1980
Ishak Abdul Rahman	BN (UMNO)	Penang	15 December 1980	14 December 1983
Ismail Hashim	BN (UMNO)	Malacca		
Ismail Hassan	BN (UMNO)	Johore	15 December 1980	14 December 1983
Ismail Sheikh Ibrahim	BN (UMNO)	Perlis		
Ismail Sheikh Ibrahim	BN (UMNO)	Perlis		17 June 1981
James Willie		Sabah	22 April 1981	21 April 1984
Joseph Unting Umang		Sarawak	6 January 1975	5 January 1978
Kenneth Kanyan Temenggong Koh		Sarawak	9 December 1981	8 December 1984
Khoo Kay Por	BN (Gerakan)	Penang	11 January 1982	10 January 1985
Lee Loy Seng	BN (MCA)	Appointed		
Lee Loy Seng	BN (MCA)	Appointed	20 December 1971	19 December 1974
Lee Loy Seng	BN (MCA)	Perak		
Loh Kee Peng	BN (MCA)	Malacca	15 December 1980	14 December 1983
Loo Swee Mok	BN (MCA)	Pahang	13 April 1981	12 April 1984
Mahimon Harun	BN (UMNO)	Pahang	9 November 1977	8 November 1980
Mahmoud Salim Mohamad	BN (UMNO)	Trengganu	9 November 1977	8 November 1980
Mohamed Nasir	BN (BERJASA)	Kelantan	17 April 1978	16 April 1981
Mohd Amin Yaakub	BN (PAS)	Kelantan	6 January 1975	5 January 1978
Nordin Pesah	BN (UMNO)	Negri Sembilan		
Oh Siew Aun	BN (Gerakan)	Penang	20 December 1971	19 December 1974
Oh Siew Aun	BN (Gerakan)	Penang	9 November 1977	8 November 1980
Pengiran Othman Pengiran Rauf		Sabah	9 October 1978	8 October 1981
Phua Cheng Leong	BN (MCA)	Pahang	11 May 1979	10 May 1982
Raja Nong Chik Raja Ishak	BN (UMNO)	Selangor	6 January 1975	5 January 1978
Syed Hassan Aidid	BN (UMNO)	Penang	22 October 1968	21 October 1971
Syed Hassan Aidid	BN (UMNO)	Penang	6 January 1975	5 January 1978
Syed Kamarulzaman Syed Bahaldin Aljamlud	BN (UMNO)	Selangor	5 January 1981	4 January 1984
Ting Ming Hia @ Ting Ming Hoi		Sarawak	2 August 1971	1 August 1974
Ting Ming Hia @ Ting Ming Hoi		Sarawak	20 December 1971	19 December 1974
Tom Saudah Othman	BN (UMNO)	Kedah	6 January 1975	5 January 1978
Yaacob Engku Yunus	BN (UMNO)	Kelantan	15 December 1980	14 December 1983
Yap Pian Tau	BN (MCA)	Selangor	18 January 1978	17 January 1981
Yeh Pao Tzu	SCA	Sabah	9 November 1977	8 November 1980
Yeh Pao Tzu	SCA	Sabah	23 April 1981	22 April 1984
Zawiah Abdullah	BN (UMNO)	Trengganu	6 January 1975	5 January 1978

== Nominated by the Prime Minister and appointed by the Yang di-Pertuan Agong ==
Senator	Party		Term start	Term end
Abdul Hamid Bidin (Deputy President)	BN (UMNO)	Appointed	9 August 1976	8 August 1979
Abdul Latip Idris	BN (UMNO)	Appointed	8 April 1979	7 April 1982
Abdul Razak Abu Samah	BN (UMNO)	Appointed	6 April 1979	5 April 1982
Abdul Razak Hussin	BN (UMNO)	Appointed	10 May 1972	9 May 1975
Abdul Razak Hussin	BN (UMNO)	Appointed	9 November 1977	8 November 1980
Abdul Samad Said	BN (UMNO)	Appointed		
Abu Bakar Titingan Damsani	BN (USNO)	Appointed	22 January 1976	21 January 1979
Abu Bakar Titingan Damsani	BN (USNO)	Appointed		20 January 1980
Ahmad Ithnin	BN (UMNO)	Appointed	6 April 1979	5 April 1982
Alexander Y. L. Lee	BN (MCA)	Appointed	11 May 1979	10 May 1982
Ariffin Salleh	BN (UMNO)	Appointed	8 April 1979	7 April 1982
Azlan Kinjawan @ Philip Meja		Appointed	6 April 1979	5 April 1982
Basharon Hanapiah	BN (UMNO)	Appointed	9 December 1981	8 December 1984
C. Sinnadurai	BN (MIC)	Appointed	6 January 1975	5 January 1978
C. Sinnadurai	BN (MIC)	Appointed	15 December 1980	14 December 1983
Choo Ching Hwa	BN (MCA)	Appointed	9 November 1977	8 November 1980
Choo Kooi Fook	BN (MCA)	Appointed	6 April 1979	5 April 1982
Daim Zainuddin	BN (UMNO)	Appointed	15 December 1980	14 December 1983
Dasimah Dasir	BN (UMNO)	Appointed	20 February 1971	19 February 1974
Dasimah Dasir	BN (UMNO)	Appointed		7 October 1980
Fatimah Salim	BN (UMNO)	Appointed		
G. Pasamanickam	BN (MIC)	Appointed	15 December 1980	14 December 1983
Hussein Mohd. Nordin	BN (UMNO)	Appointed	9 August 1976	8 August 1979
Ibrahim Salleh	BN (UMNO)	Appointed	15 December 1980	14 December 1983
Ibrahim Yaacob	BN (UMNO)	Appointed	27 January 1969	26 January 1972
Ibrahim Yaacob	BN (UMNO)	Appointed	6 January 1975	5 January 1978
Ismail Khan (President)	BN (UMNO)	Appointed	15 December 1980	14 December 1983
Kam Woon Wah	BN (MCA)	Appointed	6 January 1975	5 January 1978
Kam Woon Wah	BN (MCA)	Appointed	9 November 1977	8 November 1980
Kamarul Ariffin Mohd Yassin	BN (UMNO)	Appointed	20 February 1971	19 February 1974
Kamarul Ariffin Mohd Yassin	BN (UMNO)	Appointed	6 January 1975	5 January 1978
Khalid Abdullah	BN (UMNO)	Appointed	5 January 1976	4 January 1979
Kumaran Kanugaran	BN (MIC)	Appointed	10 December 1979	9 December 1982
Law Hieng Ding	BN (MCA)	Appointed		
Law Hieng Ding	BN (MCA)	Appointed	12 December 1979	11 December 1982
Lee Boon Chim		Appointed		
Lee Jong Ki	BN (MCA)	Appointed	14 April 1981	13 April 1984
M. Mahalingam	BN (MIC)	Appointed	9 August 1976	8 August 1979
M. Mahalingam	BN (MIC)	Appointed	15 December 1980	14 December 1983
M. Muthu Palaniappan	BN (MIC)	Appointed	15 December 1980	14 December 1983
Michael Wong Kuan Lee	BN (MCA)	Appointed	9 November 1977	8 November 1980
Mohamed Ghazali Jawi	BN (UMNO)	Appointed	9 November 1977	8 November 1980
Mohd Din Jaafar	BN (UMNO)	Appointed	7 April 1980	6 April 1983
Mohd Nor Mohamad	BN (UMNO)	Appointed	15 December 1980	14 December 1983
Mohd Tahir Abdul Majid	BN (UMNO)	Appointed	6 January 1975	5 January 1978
Mustapha Abdul Jabar	BN (UMNO)	Appointed	14 December 1978	13 December 1981
Omar Ong Yoke Lin (President)	BN (MCA)	Appointed	18 May 1964	17 May 1967
Omar Ong Yoke Lin (President)	BN (MCA)	Appointed	6 January 1975	5 January 1978
Omar Ong Yoke Lin (President)	BN (MCA)	Appointed		31 December 1980
Othman Abdullah	BN (UMNO)	Appointed	12 August 1973	11 August 1976
Othman Abdullah	BN (UMNO)	Appointed	9 November 1977	8 November 1980
Pandak Hamid Puteh Jali	BN (UMNO)	Appointed		1965
Pandak Hamid Puteh Jali	BN (UMNO)	Appointed	18 October 1965	17 October 1968
Pandak Hamid Puteh Jali	BN (UMNO)	Appointed	20 December 1971	19 December 1974
Pandak Hamid Puteh Jali	BN (UMNO)	Appointed	9 November 1977	8 November 1980
Rahmah Othman	BN (UMNO)	Appointed	6 April 1979	5 April 1982
Rogayah Ariff	BN (UMNO)	Appointed	15 December 1980	14 December 1983
Rogayah Ariff	BN (UMNO)	Appointed	13 April 1981	12 April 1984
S. I. Rajah	BN (MIC)	Appointed	6 April 1979	5 April 1982
S. O. K. Ubaidulla (Deputy President)	BN (MIC)	Appointed		1968
S. O. K. Ubaidulla (Deputy President)	BN (MIC)	Appointed	22 October 1968	21 October 1971
S. O. K. Ubaidulla (Deputy President)	BN (MIC)	Appointed	6 January 1975	5 January 1978
S. O. K. Ubaidulla (Deputy President)	BN (MIC)	Appointed		31 December 1980
Salleh Jafaruddin	BN (PBB)	Appointed		
Salmah Sheikh Hussein	BN (UMNO)	Appointed	6 January 1975	5 January 1978
Salmah Sheikh Hussein	BN (UMNO)	Appointed	9 August 1976	8 August 1979
Samad Idris	BN (UMNO)	Appointed	9 April 1979	8 April 1982
Subramaniam Sinniah	BN (MIC)	Appointed	6 April 1979	5 April 1982
Sulaiman Ninam Shah	BN (UMNO)	Appointed	6 April 1979	5 April 1982
T. S. Gabriel	BN (MIC)	Appointed	6 January 1975	5 January 1978
Tan Chang Soong	BN (MCA)	Appointed	15 December 1980	14 December 1983
Tengku Perang Tengku Razlan	BN (UMNO)	Appointed	9 April 1979	8 April 1982
V. V. Aboo	BN (MIC)	Appointed	9 August 1976	8 August 1979
V. Ponnusamy Pillai	BN (MIC)	Appointed		
Wee Khoon Hock	BN (MCA)	Appointed	6 January 1975	5 January 1978
Wong Kee Nai	BN (MCA)	Appointed	18 April 1977	17 April 1980
Wong Kee Nai	BN (MCA)	Appointed	9 November 1977	8 November 1980
Zaiton Ibrahim Ahmad	BN (UMNO)	Appointed	5 January 1981	4 January 1984

== Death in office ==
- Abu Bakar Titingan Damsani (d. 20 January 1980)
- Dasimah Dasir (d. 7 October 1980)
- Ismail Sheikh Ibrahim (d. 17 June 1981)
