= Members of the Dewan Negara, 6th Malaysian Parliament =

6th Parliament of Malaysia
←	5th Parliament	7th Parliament	→

Overview
- Legislative body: Parliament of Malaysia
- Jurisdiction: Malaysia
- Meeting place: Malaysian Houses of Parliament
- Term: 14 June 1982 – 19 July 1986
- Election: Indirect election and appointments
- Website: www.parlimen.gov.my

Dewan Negara
- Members: 68 (until 16 April 1984); 69
- President: Ismail Khan (until 13 April 1985); Benedict Stephens
- Deputy President: Abdul Hamid Bidin (until 28 July 1982); Sulaiman Ninam Shah (until 1 April 1985); Abang Ahmad Urai
- Secretary: Ahmad Hasmuni Hussein
- Party control: Barisan Nasional

Sovereign
- Yang di-Pertuan Agong: Tuanku Ahmad Shah (until 25 April 1984); Tuanku Iskandar

Sessions
- 1st: 19 July 1982 – 10 January 1984
- 2nd: 12 March 1984 – 21 December 1984
- 3rd: 25 March 1985 – 20 December 1985
- 4th: 10 March 1986 – 18 April 1986

This is a list of the members of the Dewan Negara (Senate) of the Sixth Parliament of Malaysia.

== Elected by the State Legislative Assembly ==
Senator	Party	State	Term start	Term end
Abang Ahmad Urai (Deputy President)	BN (PBB)	Sarawak	9 April 1984	8 April 1987
Ahmad Othman	BN (UMNO)	Kedah		
Bee Yang Sek	BN (MCA)	Kedah	29 July 1985	28 July 1988
Eban Salleh	BN (UMNO)	Johore	28 March 1983	6 April 1983
Fadzil Mahmood	BN (UMNO)	Perlis	9 December 1981	8 December 1984
Fadzil Mahmood	BN (UMNO)	Perlis	10 January 1984	9 January 1987
Habibah Abdul Ghani	BN (UMNO)	Pahang	19 December 1983	18 December 1986
Harun Hassan	BN (UMNO)	Trengganu	29 July 1985	28 July 1988
Hasnah Fatimah Mohd Kasim	BN (UMNO)	Trengganu		
Hasnah Fatimah Mohd Kasim	BN (UMNO)	Trengganu	10 January 1984	9 January 1987
Ibrahim @ Ahmed bin Mat Saman @ Othman	BN (UMNO)	Kedah	5 December 1983	4 December 1986
Ibrahim Ujang	BN (UMNO)	Negri Sembilan	3 December 1984	2 December 1987
Ishak Abdul Rahman	BN (UMNO)	Penang	15 December 1980	14 December 1983
Ishak Abdul Rahman	BN (UMNO)	Penang	10 January 1984	9 January 1987
Ismail Hassan	BN (UMNO)	Johore	15 December 1980	4 October 1982
James Bernard Willie		Sabah	22 April 1981	21 April 1984
James Bernard Willie		Sabah	22 December 1983	21 December 1986
Kenneth Kanyan Temenggong Koh		Sarawak	9 December 1981	8 December 1984
Kenneth Kanyan Temenggong Koh		Sarawak	30 July 1984	29 July 1987
Khoo Kay Por	BN (Gerakan)	Penang	11 January 1982	10 January 1985
Khoo Kay Por	BN (Gerakan)	Penang	10 January 1984	9 January 1987
Kuan Peng Soon @ Kuan Peng Ching	BN (MCA)	Perak	3 December 1984	2 December 1987
Loo Swee Mok	BN (MCA)	Pahang	13 April 1981	12 April 1984
Loo Swee Mok	BN (MCA)	Pahang	20 December 1983	19 December 1986
M. G. Pandithan	BN (MIC)	Selangor		
M. Nyanapandithan	BN (MIC)	Selangor	11 December 1984	10 December 1987
Mohamed Nasir	BN (BERJASA)	Kelantan	17 April 1978	16 April 1981
Mohamed Yahya	BN (UMNO)	Johore	8 August 1983	7 August 1986
Mohamed Yahya	BN (UMNO)	Johore	5 December 1983	4 December 1986
Mohd Noor Abdullah	BN (UMNO)	Kelantan	3 December 1984	2 December 1987
Mohd Noor Bedah	BN (UMNO)	Perlis	5 December 1983	4 December 1986
Mohd Yusoff Kassim	BN (UMNO)	Perak	5 December 1983	4 December 1986
Mohd Yusoff Md Nor	BN (UMNO)	Kelantan	30 July 1984	29 July 1987
Mohd Yusoff Md Nor	BN (UMNO)	Kelantan	3 December 1984	2 December 1987
Nasir Manap	BN (UMNO)	Malacca	12 December 1983	11 December 1986
Ng Ah Poi @ Wong Sian Chuan	BN (MCA)	Malacca	13 December 1983	12 December 1986
Salleh Kassim	BN (UMNO)	Trengganu	5 December 1983	3 March 1985
Tay Chee King (Chinese: 郑子瑾)	BN (MCA)	Johore	9 April 1984	8 April 1987
Wong Yau Ket		Sabah	30 July 1984	29 July 1987
Yaacob Engku Yunus	BN (UMNO)	Kelantan	15 December 1980	26 August 1983
Zakaria Yahya	BN (UMNO)	Selangor	30 July 1984	29 July 1987

== Nominated by the Prime Minister and appointed by the Yang di-Pertuan Agong ==
Senator	Party		Term start	Term end
A. Shaik Dawood Abu Bakar	BN (UMNO)	Appointed	15 February 1985	14 February 1988
Abdul Ghani Othman	BN (UMNO)	Appointed	11 December 1984	10 December 1987
Abdul Hamid Bidin (Deputy President)	BN (UMNO)	Appointed	9 August 1976	8 August 1979
Abdul Hamid Ibrahim	BN (UMNO)	Appointed	5 December 1983	4 December 1986
Abdul Hamid Latif	BN (UMNO)	Appointed	11 December 1984	10 December 1987
Abdul Jalil Abdul Rahman	BN (UMNO)	Appointed	19 July 1982	18 July 1985
Abdul Latip Idris @ Latip Dris	BN (UMNO)	Appointed	8 April 1979	7 April 1982
Abdul Latip Idris @ Latip Dris	BN (UMNO)	Appointed	19 July 1982	18 July 1985
Abdul Razak Abu Samah	BN (UMNO)	Appointed	6 April 1979	5 April 1982
Abdul Razak Abu Samah	BN (UMNO)	Appointed	19 July 1982	18 July 1985
Abdul Wahab Abu Bakar	BN (UMNO)	Appointed	19 July 1982	18 July 1985
Abdul Wahab Abu Bakar	BN (UMNO)	Appointed	9 December 1983	8 December 1986
Abdullah Fadzil Che Wan	BN (UMNO)	Appointed	16 December 1982	15 December 1985
Abdullah Fadzil Che Wan	BN (UMNO)	Appointed	18 February 1986	17 February 1989
Abu Bakar Lajim	BN (UMNO)	Appointed	11 December 1984	10 December 1987
Ainon Ariffin	BN (UMNO)	Appointed	18 February 1986	17 February 1989
Alexander Y. L. Lee	BN (MCA)	Appointed	11 May 1979	10 May 1982
Alexander Y. L. Lee	BN (MCA)	Appointed	19 July 1982	18 July 1985
Ariffin Salleh	BN (UMNO)	Appointed	8 April 1979	7 April 1982
Ariffin Salleh	BN (UMNO)	Appointed	19 July 1982	18 July 1985
Azizah Mohd. Said	BN (UMNO)	Appointed	29 July 1985	28 July 1988
Benedict Stephens (President)		Appointed	12 April 1985	11 April 1988
C. Selvarajah	BN (MIC)	Appointed	5 December 1983	4 December 1986
Chan Choong Tak	BN (MCA)	Appointed	18 February 1986	17 February 1989
D. P. Vijandran	BN (MIC)	Appointed	9 December 1982	8 December 1985
D. P. Vijandran	BN (MIC)	Appointed	2 December 1985	1 December 1988
G. Pasamanickam	BN (MIC)	Appointed	15 December 1980	14 December 1983
G. Pasamanickam	BN (MIC)	Appointed	5 December 1983	4 December 1986
Hafsah Othman	BN (UMNO)	Appointed	19 July 1982	18 July 1985
Hassan Nam		Appointed	9 April 1984	8 April 1987
Hussein Ahmad	BN (UMNO)	Appointed	11 December 1984	10 December 1987
Hussein Mohd. Nordin	BN (UMNO)	Appointed	9 August 1976	8 August 1979
Hussein Mohd. Nordin	BN (UMNO)	Appointed		8 April 1984
H'ng Hung Yong	BN (MCA)	Appointed	19 July 1982	18 July 1985
Ibrahim Salleh	BN (UMNO)	Appointed	15 December 1980	14 December 1983
Ibrahim Salleh	BN (UMNO)	Appointed	19 July 1982	18 July 1985
Ismail Khan (President)	BN (UMNO)	Appointed	15 December 1980	14 December 1983
Ismail Khan (President)	BN (UMNO)	Appointed	15 December 1983	14 December 1986
Jaafar Harun	BN (UMNO)	Appointed	17 December 1982	16 December 1985
Janaky Athi Nahappan	BN (MIC)	Appointed	19 July 1982	18 July 1985
Janaky Athi Nahappan	BN (MIC)	Appointed	5 December 1983	4 December 1986
K. S. Nijhar	BN (MIC)	Appointed	2 August 1985	1 August 1988
Kamaruzaman Ahmad	BN (UMNO)	Appointed	11 December 1984	10 December 1987
Kee Yong Wee	BN (MCA)	Appointed	19 July 1982	18 July 1985
Kee Yong Wee	BN (MCA)	Appointed	2 December 1985	1 December 1988
Kumaran Kanugaran	BN (MIC)	Appointed	10 December 1979	9 December 1982
Kumaran Kanugaran	BN (MIC)	Appointed	17 December 1982	16 December 1985
Lim Hiang Nai @ Lim Sean Lean	BN (MCA)	Appointed	5 December 1983	4 December 1986
Lim Kean Siew	BN (MCA)	Appointed	8 March 1984	7 March 1987
Loh Fook Yen	BN (MCA)	Appointed	12 December 1983	11 December 1986
M. K. Muthusamy	BN (MIC)	Appointed	19 July 1982	18 July 1985
Mazidah Zakaria	BN (UMNO)	Appointed	18 February 1986	17 February 1989
Mohamed Ghazali Jawi	BN (UMNO)	Appointed	9 November 1977	8 November 1980
Mohamed Ghazali Jawi	BN (UMNO)	Appointed		9 December 1982
Mohamed Yusof Mohamed Noor	BN (UMNO)	Appointed		
Mohd Din Jaafar	BN (UMNO)	Appointed	7 April 1980	6 April 1983
Mohd Din Jaafar	BN (UMNO)	Appointed	8 August 1983	7 August 1986
Nen Abidah Abdullah	BN (UMNO)	Appointed	20 December 1982	19 December 1985
Ng Cheng Kiat	BN (MCA)	Appointed	6 January 1986	5 January 1989
Pandak Hamid Puteh Jali	BN (UMNO)	Appointed		1965
Pandak Hamid Puteh Jali	BN (UMNO)	Appointed	18 October 1965	17 October 1968
Pandak Hamid Puteh Jali	BN (UMNO)	Appointed	20 December 1971	19 December 1974
Pandak Hamid Puteh Jali	BN (UMNO)	Appointed	9 November 1977	8 November 1980
Pandak Hamid Puteh Jali	BN (UMNO)	Appointed		22 May 1983
Paramjit Singh	BN (PPP)	Appointed	19 July 1982	18 July 1985
Paramjit Singh	BN (PPP)	Appointed	29 July 1985	28 July 1988
R. M. Jasni	BN (UMNO)	Appointed	19 July 1982	18 July 1985
R. M. Jasni	BN (UMNO)	Appointed	18 February 1986	17 February 1989
Rajoo Desari @ Govindasamy	BN (MIC)	Appointed	7 April 1986	6 April 1989
Rogayah Che Mat	BN (UMNO)	Appointed	18 February 1986	17 February 1989
Rokiah @ Maimun Zainuddin	BN (UMNO)	Appointed	8 August 1983	7 August 1986
S. Govindaraj	BN (MIC)	Appointed	19 July 1982	18 July 1985
Shaharom Maasom	BN (UMNO)	Appointed	17 December 1982	16 December 1985
Shaharom Maasom	BN (UMNO)	Appointed	18 February 1986	17 February 1989
Shuaib Lazim	BN (UMNO)	Appointed	5 April 1985	4 April 1988
Stephen Timothy Wan Ullok		Appointed	28 March 1983	27 March 1986
Sulaiman Ninam Shah (Deputy President)	BN (UMNO)	Appointed	6 April 1979	5 April 1982
Sulaiman Ninam Shah (Deputy President)	BN (UMNO)	Appointed	19 July 1982	18 July 1985
Tan Chang Soong	BN (MCA)	Appointed	15 December 1980	14 December 1983
Tan Chang Soong	BN (MCA)	Appointed	10 January 1984	9 January 1987
Tiong Hiew King	BN (SUPP)	Appointed	29 July 1985	28 July 1988
Wong Kie Yik	BN (MCA)	Appointed	26 February 1986	25 February 1989
Wong Seng Chow	BN (MCA)	Appointed	14 December 1982	13 December 1985
Zaiton Ibrahim Ahmad	BN (UMNO)	Appointed	5 January 1981	4 January 1984

== Death in office ==
- Ismail Hassan (d. 4 October 1982)
- Mohamed Ghazali Jawi (d. 9 December 1982)
- Eban Salleh (d. 6 April 1983)
- Pandak Hamid Puteh Jali (d. 22 May 1983)
- Yaacob Engku Yunus (d. 26 August 1983)
- Hussein Mohd. Nordin (d. 8 April 1984)
- Salleh Kassim (d. 3 March 1985)
