= Members of the Dewan Negara, 4th Malaysian Parliament =

4th Parliament of Malaysia
←	3rd Parliament	5th Parliament	→

Overview
- Legislative body: Parliament of Malaysia
- Jurisdiction: Malaysia
- Meeting place: Malaysian Houses of Parliament
- Term: 4 November 1974 – 12 June 1978
- Election: Indirect election and appointments
- Website: www.parlimen.gov.my

Dewan Negara
- Members: 58
- President: Omar Yoke Lin Ong
- Deputy President: S. O. K. Ubaidulla
- Secretary: Lim Joo Keng
- Party control: Barisan Nasional

Sovereign
- Yang di-Pertuan Agong: Tuanku Abdul Halim Muadzam Shah (until 20 September 1975); Tuanku Yahya Petra

Sessions
- 1st: 5 November 1974 – 29 January 1976
- 2nd: 30 March 1976 – 27 January 1977
- 3rd: 21 March 1977 – 20 January 1978
- 4th: 20 March 1978 – 28 April 1978

This is a list of the members of the Dewan Negara (Senate) of the Fourth Parliament of Malaysia.

== Elected by the State Legislative Assembly ==
Senator	Party	State	Term start	Term end
Abdul Aziz Tapa	BN (UMNO)	Malacca	22 July 1975	21 July 1978
Abdul Rahim Abdul Manan	BN (UMNO)	Negri Sembilan	6 March 1967	5 March 1970
Abdul Rahim Abdul Manan	BN (UMNO)	Negri Sembilan	20 December 1971	19 December 1974
Abu Bakar Hamzah	BN (PAS)	Kelantan	20 December 1971	19 December 1974
Ahmad Arshad	BN (UMNO)	Johore	6 January 1975	5 January 1978
Ali Ahmad	BN (UMNO)	Perlis	3 August 1977	2 August 1980
Chan Kwong Hon	BN (MCA)	Selangor		
Chan Kwong Hon	BN (MCA)	Selangor	18 December 1965	17 December 1968
Chan Kwong Hon	BN (MCA)	Selangor		29 May 1978
Chong Foo Khin	BN (MCA)	Negri Sembilan	22 October 1968	21 October 1971
Chong Foo Khin	BN (MCA)	Negri Sembilan	6 January 1975	5 January 1978
Chua Ching Cheng	BN (MCA)	Malacca	2 August 1971	1 August 1974
Chua Ching Cheng	BN (MCA)	Malacca	6 January 1975	5 January 1978
Chua Song Lim	BN (MCA)	Johore	17 April 1978	16 April 1981
Ibrahim Abdullah	BN (UMNO)	Perak	9 November 1977	8 November 1980
Ismail Hashim	BN (UMNO)	Malacca		
Ismail Sheikh Ibrahim	BN (UMNO)	Perlis		
Joseph Unting Umang		Sarawak	6 January 1975	5 January 1978
Lee Loy Seng	BN (MCA)	Appointed		
Lee Loy Seng	BN (MCA)	Appointed	20 December 1971	19 December 1974
Lee Loy Seng	BN (MCA)	Perak		
Lim Ah Sitt	BN (MCA)	Johore	2 August 1971	1 August 1974
Lim Ah Sitt	BN (MCA)	Johore	20 December 1971	19 December 1974
Lim Ching Wah		Sabah	14 April 1975	13 April 1978
Mahimon Harun	BN (UMNO)	Pahang	9 November 1977	8 November 1980
Mahmoud Salim Mohamad	BN (UMNO)	Trengganu	9 November 1977	8 November 1980
Mansor Mohamad	BN (UMNO)	Trengganu	20 December 1971	19 December 1974
Mohamed Nasir	BN (BERJASA)	Kelantan	17 April 1978	16 April 1981
Mohd Amin Yaakub	BN (PAS)	Kelantan	6 January 1975	5 January 1978
Ngau Ken Lock	BN (MCA)	Pahang	22 October 1968	21 October 1971
Ngau Ken Lock	BN (MCA)	Pahang	6 January 1975	5 January 1978
Nordin Pesah	BN (UMNO)	Negri Sembilan		
Oh Siew Aun	BN (Gerakan)	Penang	20 December 1971	19 December 1974
Oh Siew Aun	BN (Gerakan)	Penang	9 November 1977	8 November 1980
Ooi Eng Hong	BN (MCA)	Kedah		
Othman Abdullah	BN (UMNO)	Perak	12 August 1973	11 August 1976
Othman Abdullah	BN (UMNO)	Perak	9 November 1977	8 November 1980
Raja Nong Chik Raja Ishak	BN (UMNO)	Selangor	6 January 1975	5 January 1978
Stephen Robert Evans		Sabah	15 December 1977	20 June 1978
Syed Hassan Aidid	BN (UMNO)	Penang	22 October 1968	21 October 1971
Syed Hassan Aidid	BN (UMNO)	Penang	6 January 1975	5 January 1978
Syed Kechik Syed Mohamed	BN-Sabah Alliance (USNO)	Sabah		
Syed Omar Syed Hussain	BN (UMNO)	Perlis	6 January 1975	5 January 1978
Ting Ming Hia @ Ting Ming Hoi		Sarawak	2 August 1971	1 August 1974
Ting Ming Hia @ Ting Ming Hoi		Sarawak	20 December 1971	19 December 1974
Tom Saudah Othman	BN (UMNO)	Kedah	6 January 1975	5 January 1978
V. S. M. Vellayappa	BN (MIC)	Kedah	9 August 1976	8 August 1979
V. S. M. Vellayappa	BN (MIC)	Kedah	9 November 1977	8 November 1980
Wan Ibrahim Wan Tanjong	BN (UMNO)	Pahang		
Wan Ibrahim Wan Tanjong	BN (UMNO)	Pahang	18 October 1965	17 October 1968
Yap Pian Tau (叶炳)	BN (MCA)	Selangor	18 January 1978	17 January 1981
Yeh Pao Tzu (叶保滋)	SCA	Sabah	9 November 1977	8 November 1980
Zawiah Abdullah	BN (UMNO)	Trengganu	6 January 1975	5 January 1978

== Nominated by the Prime Minister and appointed by the Yang di-Pertuan Agong ==
Senator	Party		Term start	Term end
A. Arunasalam	BN (MIC)	Appointed	11 September 1964	10 September 1967
A. Arunasalam	BN (MIC)	Appointed	20 February 1971	19 February 1974
Abdul Hamid Bidin	BN (UMNO)	Appointed	9 August 1976	8 August 1979
Abdul Razak Hussin	BN (UMNO)	Appointed	10 May 1972	9 May 1975
Abdul Razak Hussin	BN (UMNO)	Appointed	9 November 1977	8 November 1980
Abdul Samad Osman	BN (UMNO)	Appointed	18 May 1964	17 May 1967
Abdul Samad Osman	BN (UMNO)	Appointed	20 February 1971	19 February 1974
Abu Bakar Titingan Damsani	Sabah Alliance (USNO)	Appointed	22 January 1976	21 January 1979
Abu Bakar Titingan Damsani	BN (USNO)	Appointed	22 January 1976	21 January 1979
Ahmad Azizuddin Zainal Abidin	BN (UMNO)	Appointed	10 August 1976	9 August 1979
Athi Nahappan	BN (MIC)	Appointed		1968
Athi Nahappan	BN (MIC)	Appointed	22 October 1968	21 October 1971
Athi Nahappan	BN (MIC)	Appointed	6 January 1975	9 May 1976
C. Sinnadurai	BN (MIC)	Appointed	6 January 1975	5 January 1978
C. D. Ismail	BN (UMNO)	Appointed	11 September 1964	10 September 1967
C. D. Ismail	BN (UMNO)	Appointed	20 February 1971	19 February 1974
Choo Ching Hwa	BN (MCA)	Appointed	9 November 1977	8 November 1980
Dasimah Dasir	BN (UMNO)	Appointed	20 February 1971	19 February 1974
Dzulkifli Abdul Hamid	BN (UMNO)	Appointed		
Fatimah Salim	BN (UMNO)	Appointed		
Gan Teck Yeow	BN (MCA)	Appointed	19 October 1964	18 October 1967
Gan Teck Yeow	BN (MCA)	Appointed	20 February 1971	19 February 1974
Hussein Mohd. Nordin	BN (UMNO)	Appointed	9 August 1976	8 August 1979
Ibrahim Yaacob	BN (UMNO)	Appointed	27 January 1969	26 January 1972
Ibrahim Yaacob	BN (UMNO)	Appointed	6 January 1975	5 January 1978
J. E. S. Crawford		Appointed		1965
J. E. S. Crawford		Appointed	18 October 1965	17 October 1968
J. E. S. Crawford		Appointed	20 December 1971	19 December 1974
Kam Woon Wah	BN (MCA)	Appointed	6 January 1975	5 January 1978
Kam Woon Wah	BN (MCA)	Appointed	9 November 1977	8 November 1980
Kamarul Ariffin Mohd Yassin	BN (UMNO)	Appointed	20 February 1971	19 February 1974
Kamarul Ariffin Mohd Yassin	BN (UMNO)	Appointed	6 January 1975	5 January 1978
Khalid Abdullah	BN (UMNO)	Appointed	5 January 1976	4 January 1979
Law Hieng Ding	BN (MCA)	Appointed		
Lee Boon Chim		Appointed		
Lim Keng Yaik	BN (Gerakan)	Appointed		
M. Mahalingam	BN (MIC)	Appointed	9 August 1976	8 August 1979
Michael Wong Kuan Lee	BN (MCA)	Appointed	9 November 1977	8 November 1980
Mohamed Ghazali Jawi	BN (UMNO)	Appointed	9 November 1977	8 November 1980
Mohamed Said Abu Bakar	Sabah Alliance (USNO)	Appointed	11 September 1964	10 September 1967
Mohamed Said Abu Bakar	Sabah Alliance (USNO)	Appointed	20 February 1971	19 February 1974
Mohamed Said Abu Bakar	BN (USNO)	Appointed		16 April 1978
Mohammad Tahir Tan Tong Hye	BN (MCA)	Appointed		
Mohammad Tahir Tan Tong Hye	BN (MCA)	Appointed	18 October 1965	17 October 1968
Mohammad Tahir Tan Tong Hye	BN (MCA)	Appointed	20 December 1971	19 December 1974
Mohd Tahir Abdul Majid	BN (UMNO)	Appointed	6 January 1975	5 January 1978
Nik Hassan Nik Yahya	BN (UMNO)	Appointed		1965
Nik Hassan Nik Yahya	BN (UMNO)	Appointed	18 October 1965	17 October 1968
Nik Hassan Nik Yahya	BN (UMNO)	Appointed	20 December 1971	19 December 1974
Omar Ong Yoke Lin (President)	BN (MCA)	Appointed	18 May 1964	17 May 1967
Omar Ong Yoke Lin (President)	BN (MCA)	Appointed	6 January 1975	5 January 1978
Pandak Hamid Puteh Jali	BN (UMNO)	Appointed		1965
Pandak Hamid Puteh Jali	BN (UMNO)	Appointed	18 October 1965	17 October 1968
Pandak Hamid Puteh Jali	BN (UMNO)	Appointed	20 December 1971	19 December 1974
Pandak Hamid Puteh Jali	BN (UMNO)	Appointed	9 November 1977	8 November 1980
Rafidah Aziz	BN (UMNO)	Appointed	6 January 1975	5 January 1978
Rafidah Aziz	BN (UMNO)	Appointed	9 November 1977	8 November 1980
S. O. K. Ubaidulla (Deputy President)	BN (MIC)	Appointed		1968
S. O. K. Ubaidulla (Deputy President)	BN (MIC)	Appointed	22 October 1968	21 October 1971
S. O. K. Ubaidulla (Deputy President)	BN (MIC)	Appointed	6 January 1975	5 January 1978
S. P. Seenivasagam	BN (PPP)	Appointed	14 April 1975	4 July 1975
Salleh Jafaruddin		Appointed	18 April 1977	17 April 1980
Salmah Sheikh Hussein	BN (UMNO)	Appointed	6 January 1975	5 January 1978
Salmah Sheikh Hussein	BN (UMNO)	Appointed	9 August 1976	8 August 1979
Seah Teng Ngiab	BN (MCA)	Appointed	6 January 1975	5 January 1978
Siti Fatimah Sheikh Hussein	BN (UMNO)	Appointed		
T. S. Gabriel	BN (MIC)	Appointed	6 January 1975	5 January 1978
V. V. Aboo	BN (MIC)	Appointed	9 August 1976	8 August 1979
V. Ponnusamy Pillai	BN (MIC)	Appointed		
Wan Sulaiman Wan Tam	BN (UMNO)	Appointed	28 March 1966	27 March 1969
Wan Sulaiman Wan Tam	BN (UMNO)	Appointed	20 February 1971	19 February 1974
Wee Khoon Hock	BN (MCA)	Appointed	6 January 1975	5 January 1978
Wong Kee Nai	BN (MCA)	Appointed	18 April 1977	17 April 1980
Wong Kee Nai	BN (MCA)	Appointed	9 November 1977	8 November 1980

== Death in office ==
- S. P. Seenivasagam (d. 4 July 1975)
- Athi Nahappan (d. 9 May 1976)
- Ngau Ken Lock (d. 8 March 1978)
- Mohamed Said Abu Bakar (d. 16 April 1978)
- Chan Kwong Hon (d. 29 May 1978)
