= Members of the Dewan Negara, 7th Malaysian Parliament =

7th Parliament of Malaysia
←	6th Parliament	8th Parliament	→

Overview
- Legislative body: Parliament of Malaysia
- Jurisdiction: Malaysia
- Meeting place: Malaysian Houses of Parliament
- Term: 6 October 1986 – 5 October 1990
- Election: Indirect election and appointments
- Website: www.parlimen.gov.my

Dewan Negara
- Members: 69
- President: Benedict Stephens (until 11 April 1988); Abang Ahmad Urai
- Deputy President: Abang Ahmad Urai (until 10 July 1988); Tan Peng Khoon (27 December 1989); Chan Choong Tak
- Secretary: Abdul Rahim Abu Bakar (until 1988); Mohamad Salleh Abu Bakar
- Party control: Barisan Nasional

Sovereign
- Yang di-Pertuan Agong: Tuanku Iskandar (until 25 April 1989); Tuanku Azlan Shah

Sessions
- 1st: 7 October 1986 – 18 December 1987
- 2nd: 7 March 1988 – 16 December 1988
- 3rd: 6 March 1989 – 29 December 1989
- 4th: 26 February 1990 – 29 June 1990

This is a list of the members of the Dewan Negara (Senate) of the Seventh Parliament of Malaysia.

== Elected by the State Legislative Assembly ==
Senator	Party	State	Term start	Term end
Abang Ahmad Urai (Deputy President) (President)	BN (PBB)	Sarawak	9 April 1984	8 April 1987
Abang Ahmad Urai (Deputy President) (President)	BN (PBB)	Sarawak	10 July 1987	9 July 1990
Abdul Majid Abdullah	BN (UMNO)	Johor	11 December 1986	10 December 1989
Abdul Majid Abdullah	BN (UMNO)	Johor	26 December 1989	25 December 1992
Abdul Manap Hashim	BN (UMNO)	Kedah	9 December 1986	8 December 1989
Abdul Rashid Ismail	BN (UMNO)	Penang	19 March 1990	18 March 1993
Ahmad Othman	BN (UMNO)	Kedah		
Asmah Ismail	BN (UMNO)	Pahang	25 June 1990	24 June 1993
Azumu Tak	BN (UMNO)	Perak	30 November 1987	29 November 1990
Balaram Pethanaidu	BN (MIC)	Kedah	11 July 1988	10 July 1991
Bee Yang Sek	BN (MCA)	Kedah	29 July 1985	28 July 1988
Chong Eng Leong		Sabah	7 March 1988	6 March 1991
Chong Chi Siong	BN (MCA)	Negeri Sembilan	25 August 1989	24 August 1992
Dahalan Embun	BN (UMNO)	Perlis	23 March 1987	22 March 1990
Dol Dollah	BN (UMNO)	Malacca	19 December 1989	18 December 1992
Douglas Sullang Ganda	BN (PBB)	Sarawak	30 November 1987	29 November 1990
Fadzil Mahmood	BN (UMNO)	Perlis	9 December 1981	8 December 1984
Fadzil Mahmood	BN (UMNO)	Perlis	10 January 1984	9 January 1987
Foo Boon Liang	BN (MCA)	Pahang	13 July 1987	12 July 1990
Foo Boon Liang	BN (MCA)	Pahang	25 June 1990	24 June 1993
Frankie Chong Yu Chee		Sabah	17 December 1990	16 December 1993
Habibah Abdul Ghani	BN (UMNO)	Pahang	19 December 1983	18 December 1986
Habidah Jusoh	BN (UMNO)	Terengganu	23 February 1987	22 February 1990
Habidah Jusoh	BN (UMNO)	Terengganu	26 December 1989	25 December 1992
Hamid Araby Md. Salih	BN (UMNO)	Penang		
Harun Hassan	BN (UMNO)	Terengganu	29 July 1985	28 July 1988
Hasnah Fatimah Mohd Kasim	BN (UMNO)	Terengganu		
Hasnah Fatimah Mohd Kasim	BN (UMNO)	Terengganu	10 January 1984	9 January 1987
Hassan Alban Sandukong		Sabah	15 December 1986	14 December 1989
Hassan Harun	BN (UMNO)	Kelantan	28 March 1988	27 March 1991
Ibrahim Ujang	BN (UMNO)	Negeri Sembilan	3 December 1984	2 December 1987
Ibrahim Ujang	BN (UMNO)	Negeri Sembilan	30 November 1987	29 November 1990
Ida Dumpangal née Ida Undan		Sabah	29 December 1989	28 December 1992
Ishak Abdul Rahman	BN (UMNO)	Penang	15 December 1980	14 December 1983
Ishak Abdul Rahman	BN (UMNO)	Penang	10 January 1984	9 January 1987
James Bernard Willie		Sabah	22 April 1981	21 April 1984
James Bernard Willie		Sabah	22 December 1983	21 December 1986
Joseph Lau Keng Seong	BN (MCA)	Johor	30 November 1987	29 November 1990
Kenneth Kanyan Temenggong Koh		Sarawak	9 December 1981	8 December 1984
Kenneth Kanyan Temenggong Koh		Sarawak	30 July 1984	29 July 1987
Khoo Kay Por	BN (Gerakan)	Penang	11 January 1982	10 January 1985
Khoo Kay Por	BN (Gerakan)	Penang	10 January 1984	9 January 1987
Koh Im Pin	BN (MCA)	Negeri Sembilan	1 December 1986	30 November 1989
Kuan Peng Soon @ Kuan Peng Ching	BN (MCA)	Perak	3 December 1984	2 December 1987
Kuan Peng Soon @ Kuan Peng Ching	BN (MCA)	Perak	11 July 1988	10 July 1991
Lim Chien Aun	BN (Gerakan)	Penang	19 March 1990	18 March 1993
Lim Heng Tee	BN (Gerakan)	Penang	23 February 1987	22 February 1990
Loo Swee Mok	BN (MCA)	Pahang	13 April 1981	12 April 1984
Loo Swee Mok	BN (MCA)	Pahang	20 December 1983	19 December 1986
Mohamed Yahya	BN (UMNO)	Johor	8 August 1983	7 August 1986
Mohamed Yahya	BN (UMNO)	Johor	5 December 1983	4 December 1986
Mohd Noor Abdullah	BN (UMNO)	Kelantan	3 December 1984	2 December 1987
Mohd Noor Abdullah	BN (UMNO)	Kelantan	28 March 1988	27 March 1991
Mohd Noor Bedah	BN (UMNO)	Perlis	5 December 1983	4 December 1986
Mohd Noor Bedah	BN (UMNO)	Perlis	19 December 1986	18 December 1989
Mohd Yusoff Kassim	BN (UMNO)	Perak	5 December 1983	4 December 1986
Mohd Yusoff Md Nor	BN (UMNO)	Kelantan	30 July 1984	29 July 1987
Mohd Yusoff Md Nor	BN (UMNO)	Kelantan	3 December 1984	2 December 1987
Mustafa Awang	BN (UMNO)	Terengganu	15 December 1986	14 December 1989
Mustafa Awang	BN (UMNO)	Terengganu	26 December 1989	25 December 1992
Nasir Manap	BN (UMNO)	Malacca	12 December 1983	11 December 1986
Nasir Manap	BN (UMNO)	Malacca	1 December 1986	30 November 1989
Ng Ah Poi @ Wong Sian Chuan	BN (MCA)	Malacca	13 December 1983	12 December 1986
Ng Khek Kiung	BN (MCA)	Selangor	11 December 1987	10 December 1990
Ng Peng Hong @ Ng Peng Hay	BN (MCA)	Malacca	23 March 1987	22 March 1990
Ng Peng Hong @ Ng Peng Hay	BN (MCA)	Malacca	29 May 1990	28 May 1993
Norani Beluah	BN (UMNO)	Pahang	13 July 1987	12 July 1990
Pandikar Amin Mulia		Sabah	7 March 1988	6 March 1991
Saidin Mohamad	BN (UMNO)	Perlis	19 December 1989	18 December 1992
Shuib Endut	BN (UMNO)	Kedah	19 December 1989	18 December 1992
Sivalingam Arumugam Kuruppiah	BN (MIC)	Selangor	15 December 1986	14 December 1989
Sivalingam Arumugam Kuruppiah	BN (MIC)	Appointed	28 November 1988	27 November 1991
Tay Chee King	BN (MCA)	Johor	9 April 1984	8 April 1987
Wan Hamid Edruce Tuanku Mohamad	BN (PBB)	Sarawak	17 December 1990	16 December 1993
Wong Yau Ket		Sabah	30 July 1984	29 July 1987
Zakaria Yahya	BN (UMNO)	Selangor	30 July 1984	29 July 1987
Zakaria Yahya	BN (UMNO)	Selangor	8 December 1987	7 December 1990

== Nominated by the Prime Minister and appointed by the Yang di-Pertuan Agong ==
Senator	Party		Term start	Term end
A. Shaik Dawood Abu Bakar	BN (UMNO)	Appointed	15 February 1985	14 February 1988
Abdul Hamid Ibrahim	BN (UMNO)	Appointed	5 December 1983	4 December 1986
Abdul Hamid Ibrahim	BN (UMNO)	Appointed	15 December 1986	14 December 1989
Abdul Hamid Latif	BN (UMNO)	Appointed	11 December 1984	10 December 1987
Abdul Hamid Latif	BN (UMNO)	Appointed	10 December 1987	9 December 1990
Abdul Wahab Abu Bakar	BN (UMNO)	Appointed	19 July 1982	18 July 1985
Abdul Wahab Abu Bakar	BN (UMNO)	Appointed	9 December 1983	8 December 1986
Abdullah Fadzil Che Wan	BN (UMNO)	Appointed	16 December 1982	15 December 1985
Abdullah Fadzil Che Wan	BN (UMNO)	Appointed	18 February 1986	17 February 1989
Abu Bakar Lajim	BN (UMNO)	Appointed	11 December 1984	10 December 1987
Abu Bakar Lajim	BN (UMNO)	Appointed	10 December 1987	9 December 1990
Adam Kadir	BN (UMNO)	Appointed	17 December 1990	16 December 1993
Ainon Ariffin	BN (UMNO)	Appointed	18 February 1986	17 February 1989
Ainon Ariffin	BN (UMNO)	Appointed	27 March 1989	26 March 1992
Annuar Musa	BN (UMNO)	Appointed	17 December 1990	16 December 1993
Azizah Mohd. Said	BN (UMNO)	Appointed	29 July 1985	28 July 1988
Azman Atar Othman	BN (UMNO)	Appointed	23 February 1987	22 February 1990
Azman Atar Othman	BN (UMNO)	Appointed	19 March 1990	18 March 1993
Benedict Stephens (President)		Appointed	12 April 1985	11 April 1988
C. Krishnan	BN (MIC)	Appointed	15 December 1986	14 December 1989
C. Krishnan	BN (MIC)	Appointed	18 December 1989	17 December 1992
C. Selvarajah	BN (MIC)	Appointed	5 December 1983	4 December 1986
Chan Choong Tak (Deputy President)	BN (MCA)	Appointed	18 February 1986	17 February 1989
Chan Choong Tak (Deputy President)	BN (MCA)	Appointed	3 April 1989	2 April 1992
D. P. Vijandran	BN (MIC)	Appointed	9 December 1982	8 December 1985
D. P. Vijandran	BN (MIC)	Appointed	2 December 1985	1 December 1988
David Yeoh Eng Hock	BN (MCA)	Appointed	19 October 1989	18 October 1992
G. Pasamanickam	BN (MIC)	Appointed	15 December 1980	14 December 1983
G. Pasamanickam	BN (MIC)	Appointed	5 December 1983	4 December 1986
Hassan Nam		Appointed	9 April 1984	8 April 1987
Hassan Nam		Appointed	23 March 1987	22 March 1990
Hussein Ahmad	BN (UMNO)	Appointed	11 December 1984	10 December 1987
Hussein Ahmad	BN (UMNO)	Appointed	10 December 1987	9 December 1990
Ibrahim Jendol	BN (UMNO)	Appointed	25 August 1988	24 August 1991
Isli Siput		Appointed		
Ismail Khan	BN (UMNO)	Appointed	15 December 1980	14 December 1983
Ismail Khan	BN (UMNO)	Appointed	15 December 1983	14 December 1986
Ismail Nagore	BN (UMNO)	Appointed	23 February 1987	3 June 1987
Itam Wali Nawan		Appointed		
Jaafar Harun	BN (UMNO)	Appointed	17 December 1982	16 December 1985
Jaafar Harun	BN (UMNO)	Appointed	15 December 1986	14 December 1989
Janaky Athi Nahappan	BN (MIC)	Appointed	19 July 1982	18 July 1985
Janaky Athi Nahappan	BN (MIC)	Appointed	5 December 1983	4 December 1986
K. S. Nijhar	BN (MIC)	Appointed	2 August 1985	1 August 1988
K. S. Nijhar	BN (MIC)	Appointed	25 August 1988	24 August 1991
Kamaruzaman Ahmad	BN (UMNO)	Appointed	11 December 1984	10 December 1987
Kee Yong Wee	BN (MCA)	Appointed	19 July 1982	18 July 1985
Kee Yong Wee	BN (MCA)	Appointed	2 December 1985	1 December 1988
Law Jack Yoon	BN (MCA)	Appointed	14 February 1987	13 February 1990
Law Jack Yoon	BN (MCA)	Appointed	18 December 1989	17 December 1992
Lim Hiang Nai @ Lim Sean Lean	BN (MCA)	Appointed	5 December 1983	4 December 1986
Lim Kean Siew	BN (MCA)	Appointed	8 March 1984	7 March 1987
M. Sangaralingam	BN (MIC)	Appointed	15 December 1986	14 December 1989
Mak Hon Kam	BN (MCA)	Appointed	1 December 1986	30 December 1989
Mazidah Zakaria	BN (UMNO)	Appointed	18 February 1986	17 February 1989
Mazidah Zakaria	BN (UMNO)	Appointed	27 March 1989	26 March 1992
Mohamed Yusof Mohamed Noor	BN (UMNO)	Appointed		
Mohd Ghazali Mohd Seth	BN (UMNO)	Appointed	19 March 1990	18 March 1993
Mohd. Wajdi Ishak	BN (UMNO)	Appointed	23 February 1987	22 February 1990
Mohd. Wajdi Ishak	BN (UMNO)	Appointed	20 February 1990	19 February 1993
Muhammad Farid Saad	BN (UMNO)	Appointed	20 May 1987	19 May 1990
Muhammad Farid Saad	BN (UMNO)	Appointed	29 May 1990	28 May 1993
Nawawi Mat Awin	BN (UMNO)	Appointed	3 August 1988	2 August 1991
Ng Cheng Kiat	BN (MCA)	Appointed	6 January 1986	5 January 1989
Nordin Selat	BN (UMNO)	Appointed	23 February 1987	22 February 1990
Nordin Selat	BN (UMNO)	Appointed	27 March 1989	26 March 1992
Paramjit Singh	BN (PPP)	Appointed	19 July 1982	18 July 1985
Paramjit Singh	BN (PPP)	Appointed	29 July 1985	28 July 1988
R. M. Jasni	BN (UMNO)	Appointed	19 July 1982	18 July 1985
R. M. Jasni	BN (UMNO)	Appointed	18 February 1986	17 February 1989
Rajoo Desari @ Govindasamy	BN (MIC)	Appointed	7 April 1986	6 April 1989
Rajoo Desari @ Govindasamy	BN (MIC)	Appointed	4 April 1989	3 April 1992
Rogayah Che Mat	BN (UMNO)	Appointed	18 February 1986	17 February 1989
Rogayah Che Mat	BN (UMNO)	Appointed	27 March 1989	26 March 1992
Rokiah @ Maimun Zainuddin	BN (UMNO)	Appointed	8 August 1983	7 August 1986
Rokiah @ Maimun Zainuddin	BN (UMNO)	Appointed	1 December 1986	30 November 1989
Rosnah Mohd. Salleh	BN (UMNO)	Appointed	23 February 1987	22 February 1990
Rosnah Mohd. Salleh	BN (UMNO)	Appointed	20 February 1990	19 February 1993
Salbiah Mohd. Akim	BN (UMNO)	Appointed	1 December 1986	30 November 1989
Salbiah Mohd. Akim	BN (UMNO)	Appointed	5 July 1989	4 July 1992
Shaharom Maasom	BN (UMNO)	Appointed	17 December 1982	16 December 1985
Shaharom Maasom	BN (UMNO)	Appointed	18 February 1986	17 February 1989
Shuaib Lazim	BN (UMNO)	Appointed	5 April 1985	4 April 1988
Shuaib Lazim	BN (UMNO)	Appointed	11 July 1988	10 July 1991
Stephen Timothy Wan Ullok		Appointed	28 March 1983	27 March 1986
Stephen Timothy Wan Ullok		Appointed	1 December 1986	30 November 1989
Syed Abdul Hamid Sagaff	BN (UMNO)	Appointed	16 December 1987	15 December 1990
Tan Chai Ho	BN (MCA)	Appointed	14 February 1987	13 February 1990
Tan Chai Ho	BN (MCA)	Appointed	28 November 1988	27 November 1991
Tan Chang Soong	BN (MCA)	Appointed	15 December 1980	14 December 1983
Tan Chang Soong	BN (MCA)	Appointed	10 January 1984	9 January 1987
Tan Chong Keng	BN (MCA)	Appointed	16 December 1987	15 December 1990
Tan Peng Khoon (Deputy President)	BN (MCA)	Appointed	14 February 1987	13 February 1990
Tan Peng Khoon (Deputy President)	BN (MCA)	Appointed	18 December 1989	1 February 1991
Tiong Hiew King	BN (SUPP)	Appointed	29 July 1985	28 July 1988
Tiong Hiew King	BN (SUPP)	Appointed	28 November 1988	27 November 1991
V. K. Sellappan	BN (MIC)	Appointed	11 July 1988	10 July 1991
Valli Muthusamy	BN (MIC)	Appointed	15 December 1986	14 December 1989
Valli Muthusamy	BN (MIC)	Appointed	11 December 1989	10 December 1992
Wong Kie Yik	BN (MCA)	Appointed	26 February 1986	25 February 1989
Wong Kie Yik	BN (MCA)	Appointed	25 August 1989	24 August 1992

== Death in office ==
- Ismail Nagore (d. 3 June 1987)
