= Members of the Dewan Negara, 3rd Malaysian Parliament =

3rd Parliament of Malaysia
←	2nd Parliament	4th Parliament	→

Overview
- Legislative body: Parliament of Malaysia
- Jurisdiction: Malaysia
- Meeting place: Malaysian Houses of Parliament
- Term: 20 February 1971 – 31 July 1974
- Election: Indirect election and appointments
- Website: www.parlimen.gov.my

Dewan Negara
- Members: 58
- President: Abdul Hamid Khan (until 22 February 1973); Omar Yoke Lin Ong
- Deputy President: S. O. K. Ubaidulla
- Secretary: Lim Joo Keng
- Party control: Alliance (until 1973); Barisan Nasional

Sovereign
- Yang di-Pertuan Agong: Tuanku Abdul Halim Muadzam Shah

Sessions
- 1st: 20 February 1971 – 18 February 1972
- 2nd: 9 May 1972 – 23 February 1973
- 3rd: 17 April 1973 – 7 February 1974
- 4th: 15 April 1974 – 30 July 1974

This is a list of the members of the Dewan Negara (Senate) of the Third Parliament of Malaysia. From 1969 to 1971, the National Operations Council governed the country in lieu of the elected government. In 1971, the NOC was dissolved with the restoration of Third Parliament of Malaysia.

== Elected by the State Legislative Assembly ==
Senator	Party	State	Term start	Term end
Abdul Rahim Abdul Manan	Alliance (UMNO)	Negri Sembilan	6 March 1967	5 March 1973
Abdul Rahim Abdul Manan	Alliance (UMNO)	Negri Sembilan	20 December 1971	19 December 1977
Abdullah Abdul Rahman	Alliance (UMNO)	Johore		
Abu Bakar Ahmad	Alliance (UMNO)	Trengganu		
Abu Bakar Hamzah	PMIP	Kelantan	20 December 1971	19 December 1977
Ali Ismail	Alliance (UMNO)	Kedah	20 December 1971	19 December 1977
Amaluddin Darus	PMIP	Kelantan		
Amaluddin Darus	PMIP	Kelantan	22 October 1968	21 October 1974
Chan Kwong Hon	Alliance (MCA)	Selangor		
Chan Kwong Hon	Alliance (MCA)	Selangor	18 December 1965	17 December 1971
Chong Foo Khin	Alliance (MCA)	Negri Sembilan	22 October 1968	21 October 1974
Chua Ching Cheng	Alliance (MCA)	Malacca	2 August 1971	1 August 1977
Goh Chek Kin	Alliance (MCA)	Trengganu	18 October 1965	17 October 1971
Hassan Yaakub	Alliance (UMNO)	Malacca	2 August 1971	1 August 1977
Ibrahim Yaacob	Alliance (UMNO)	Selangor	27 January 1969	26 January 1975
Ismail Sheikh Ibrahim	Alliance (UMNO)	Perlis	20 December 1971	19 December 1977
Joseph Augustine Angian Andulag		Sabah	2 November 1963	1 November 1969
Joseph Augustine Angian Andulag		Sabah	18 December 1965	17 December 1971
K. R. Somasundram	Alliance (MIC)	Kedah	4 March 1968	3 March 1974
Khoo Siak Chiew	Sabah Alliance (SCA)	Sabah		
Lim Ah Sitt	Alliance (MCA)	Johore	2 August 1971	1 August 1977
Lim Ah Sitt	Alliance (MCA)	Johore	20 December 1971	19 December 1977
Mahathir Mohamad	Alliance (UMNO)	Kedah	12 August 1973	11 August 1979
Mansor Mohamad	Alliance (UMNO)	Trengganu	20 December 1971	19 December 1977
Md Hanipah Sheikh Alauddin	Alliance (UMNO)	Kedah	4 January 1968	3 January 1974
Md Hanipah Sheikh Alauddin	Alliance (UMNO)	Kedah	22 October 1968	21 October 1974
Ngau Ken Lock	Alliance (MCA)	Pahang	22 October 1968	21 October 1974
Oh Siew Aun	Gerakan	Penang	20 December 1971	19 December 1977
Ooi Eng Hong	Alliance (MCA)	Kedah		
Othman Abdullah	Alliance (UMNO)	Perak	12 August 1973	11 August 1979
Oyong Lawai Jau	SNAP	Sarawak	2 November 1963	1 November 1969
Oyong Lawai Jau	SNAP	Sarawak	22 October 1968	21 October 1974
Oyong Lawai Jau	SNAP	Sarawak		6 August 1974
Pengiran Mohamed Digadong Galpam		Sabah	2 November 1963	1 November 1969
Pengiran Mohamed Digadong Galpam		Sabah	27 January 1969	26 January 1975
Said Besar Sigoh Singkunan		Sabah		
Shaari Jusoh	Alliance (UMNO)	Perlis	2 August 1971	1 August 1977
Syed Darus Syed Hashim	Alliance (UMNO)	Perlis	18 December 1965	17 December 1971
Syed Hassan Aidid	Alliance (UMNO)	Penang	22 October 1968	21 October 1974
Syed Hussein Alatas	Gerakan	Penang	2 August 1971	1 August 1977
Syed Hussein Alatas	Pekemas	Penang	2 August 1971	1 August 1977
Syed Kechik Syed Mohamed	Sabah Alliance (USNO)	Sabah		
Ting Ming Hia @ Ting Ming Hoi		Sarawak	2 August 1971	1 August 1977
Ting Ming Hia @ Ting Ming Hoi		Sarawak	20 December 1971	19 December 1977
Wan Ibrahim Wan Tanjong	Alliance (UMNO)	Pahang		
Wan Ibrahim Wan Tanjong	Alliance (UMNO)	Pahang	18 October 1965	17 October 1971
Wan Mustapha Wan Ali	PMIP	Kelantan	16 August 1965	15 August 1971
Wan Mustapha Wan Ali	PMIP	Kelantan	18 October 1965	17 October 1971
Yahya Ahmad	Alliance (UMNO)	Perak	19 October 1964	18 October 1970
Yahya Ahmad	Alliance (UMNO)	Perak	18 October 1965	17 October 1971
Yahya Ahmad	Alliance (UMNO)	Perak	20 December 1971	19 December 1977
Yeap Kheng Yam	Alliance (MCA)	Perak	2 August 1971	1 August 1977

== Nominated by the Prime Minister and appointed by the Yang di-Pertuan Agong ==
Senator	Party		Term start	Term end
A. Arunasalam	Alliance (MIC)	Appointed	11 September 1964	10 September 1970
A. Arunasalam	Alliance (MIC)	Appointed	20 February 1971	19 February 1977
Abdul Hamid Khan (President)	Alliance (UMNO)	Appointed	20 February 1971	19 February 1977
Abdul Kadir Yusuf	Alliance (UMNO)	Appointed	20 February 1971	19 February 1977
Abdul Kadir Yusuf	Alliance (UMNO)	Appointed	20 December 1971	19 December 1977
Abdul Razak Hussin	Alliance (UMNO)	Appointed	10 May 1972	9 May 1978
Abdul Samad Osman	Alliance (UMNO)	Appointed	18 May 1964	17 May 1970
Abdul Samad Osman	Alliance (UMNO)	Appointed	20 February 1971	19 February 1977
Aishah Ghani	Alliance (UMNO)	Appointed	15 October 1962	14 October 1968
Aishah Ghani	Alliance (UMNO)	Appointed	22 October 1968	21 October 1974
Andrew Jika Landau		Appointed	18 May 1964	17 May 1970
Andrew Jika Landau		Appointed	18 October 1965	17 October 1971
Athi Nahappan	Alliance (MIC)	Appointed		1968
Athi Nahappan	Alliance (MIC)	Appointed	22 October 1968	21 October 1974
Awang Daud Matusin		Appointed	19 October 1964	18 October 1970
Awang Daud Matusin		Appointed	20 February 1971	19 February 1977
C. D. Ismail	Alliance (UMNO)	Appointed	11 September 1964	10 September 1970
C. D. Ismail	Alliance (UMNO)	Appointed	20 February 1971	19 February 1977
Cheah Toon Lok	Alliance (MCA)	Appointed		1968
Cheah Toon Lok	Alliance (MCA)	Appointed	22 October 1968	21 October 1974
Dasimah Dasir	Alliance (UMNO)	Appointed	20 February 1971	19 February 1977
Dzulkifli Abdul Hamid	Alliance (UMNO)	Appointed		
E. E. C. Thuraisingham		Appointed		1968
E. E. C. Thuraisingham		Appointed	22 October 1968	21 October 1974
Foo See Moi	Alliance (MCA)	Appointed	11 September 1964	10 September 1970
Foo See Moi	Alliance (MCA)	Appointed	22 October 1968	21 October 1974
G. Louis		Appointed	22 October 1968	21 October 1974
Gan Teck Yeow	Alliance (MCA)	Appointed	19 October 1964	18 October 1970
Gan Teck Yeow	Alliance (MCA)	Appointed	20 February 1971	19 February 1977
Hong Kim Sui	Alliance (MCA)	Appointed	17 March 1966	16 March 1972
J. E. S. Crawford		Appointed		1965
J. E. S. Crawford		Appointed	18 October 1965	17 October 1971
J. E. S. Crawford		Appointed	20 December 1971	19 December 1977
Kamarul Ariffin Mohd Yassin	Alliance (UMNO)	Appointed	20 February 1971	19 February 1977
Law Hieng Ding	Alliance (MCA)	Appointed		
Lee Loy Seng	Alliance (MCA)	Appointed		
Lee Loy Seng	Alliance (MCA)	Appointed	20 December 1971	19 December 1977
Lee Yoon Thim	Alliance (MCA)	Appointed	18 May 1964	17 May 1970
Lee Yoon Thim	Alliance (MCA)	Appointed	18 October 1965	17 October 1971
Lew Sip Hon	Alliance (MCA)	Appointed	6 August 1973	5 August 1979
Lim Hee Hong	Alliance (MCA)	Appointed		1965
Lim Hee Hong	Alliance (MCA)	Appointed	18 October 1965	17 October 1971
Lim Keng Yaik	Alliance (MCA)	Appointed		
Lim Keng Yaik	BN (Gerakan)	Appointed		
Mohamed Said Abu Bakar	Sabah Alliance (USNO)	Appointed	11 September 1964	10 September 1970
Mohamed Said Abu Bakar	Sabah Alliance (USNO)	Appointed	20 February 1971	19 February 1977
Muhammad Ghazali Shafie	Alliance (UMNO)	Appointed	20 February 1971	19 February 1977
Muhammad Ghazali Shafie	Alliance (UMNO)	Appointed	20 December 1971	19 December 1977
Nik Hassan Nik Yahya	Alliance (UMNO)	Appointed		1965
Nik Hassan Nik Yahya	Alliance (UMNO)	Appointed	18 October 1965	17 October 1971
Nik Hassan Nik Yahya	Alliance (UMNO)	Appointed	20 December 1971	19 December 1977
Omar Ong Yoke Lin (President)	Alliance (MCA)	Appointed	18 May 1964	17 May 1970
Pandak Hamid Puteh Jali	Alliance (UMNO)	Appointed		1965
Pandak Hamid Puteh Jali	Alliance (UMNO)	Appointed	18 October 1965	17 October 1971
Pandak Hamid Puteh Jali	Alliance (UMNO)	Appointed	20 December 1971	19 December 1977
S. O. K. Ubaidulla (Deputy President)	Alliance (MIC)	Appointed		1968
S. O. K. Ubaidulla (Deputy President)	Alliance (MIC)	Appointed	22 October 1968	21 October 1974
S. T. Mani	Alliance (MIC)	Appointed	28 August 1967	27 August 1973
Tan Tong Hye	Alliance (MCA)	Appointed		
Tan Tong Hye	Alliance (MCA)	Appointed	18 October 1965	17 October 1971
Tan Tong Hye	Alliance (MCA)	Appointed	20 December 1971	19 December 1977
Thomas Kana		Appointed	20 December 1971	19 December 1977
V. Ponnusamy Pillai	Alliance (MIC)	Appointed		
Wan Sulaiman Wan Tam	Alliance (UMNO)	Appointed	28 March 1966	27 March 1972
Wan Sulaiman Wan Tam	Alliance (UMNO)	Appointed	20 February 1971	19 February 1977
William Tan Ho Choon	Sarawak Alliance (SCA)	Appointed	27 December 1963	26 December 1969
William Tan Ho Choon	Sarawak Alliance (SCA)	Appointed	18 October 1965	17 October 1971
Wong Seng Chow	Alliance (MCA)	Appointed	20 December 1971	19 December 1977
Wong Swee Soon	Alliance (MCA)	Appointed	20 February 1971	19 February 1977
Zainuddin Mohd Sidin	Alliance (UMNO)	Appointed	20 February 1971	19 February 1977

== Death in office ==
- Oyong Lawai Jau (d. 6 August 1974)

== Footnotes ==
The Hansard has two different records of T. H. Tan, one as Mohamed Noor Tahir and the other as T. H. Tan.
