= Tunku Osman =

Malaysian general

Yang Teramat Mulia General (Rtd) Tan Sri Dato' Tunku Osman Tunku Mohd Jewa PGAT PMN DIMP JMN PPT PPM
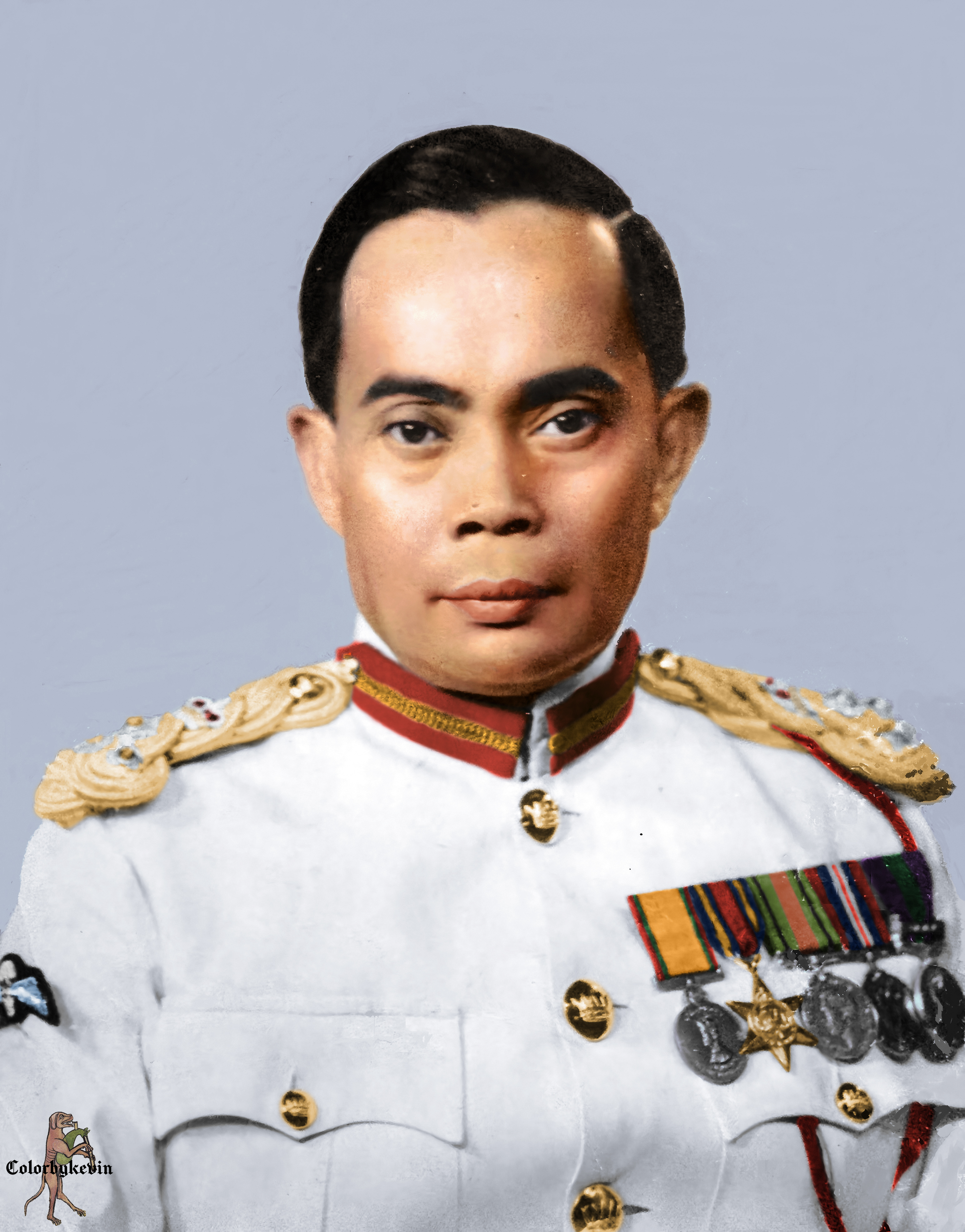

3rd Chief of Defence Forces
- In office 1 January 1964 – 24 November 1969
- Monarchs: Putra of Perlis; Ismail Nasiruddin of Terengganu
- Prime Minister: Tunku Abdul Rahman
- Preceded by: Rodney Moore
- Succeeded by: Abdul Hamid Bidin

3rd Chief of Army
- In office 6 September 1962 – 1 January 1964
- Preceded by: Rodney Moore
- Succeeded by: Abdul Hamid Bidin

Personal details
- Born: Tunku Osman bin Tunku Mohd Jewa; 24 November 1919 Kedah, Unfederated Malay States, British Malaya
- Died: 19 April 1994 (aged 74) Kuala Lumpur, Malaysia
- Resting place: Kedah Royal Mausoleum
- Citizenship: Malaysian
- Relatives: Sultan Abdul Halim of Kedah (cousin); Sultan Sallehuddin of Kedah (cousin); Tunku Abdul Rahman (uncle); Tunku Abdul Malik (cousin); Tunku Annuar (cousin)
- Education: Sultan Abdul Hamid College; Bristol Grammar School
- Profession: Senior military officer; secret agent

Military service
- Branch/service: British Army; Special Operations Executive; Malaysian Army
- Years of service: 1937–1969
- Rank: General
- Unit: Reconnaissance Corps (WWII); Force 136 (WWII); Royal Malay Regiment
- Commands: 2nd Battalion, Royal Malay Regiment; 2nd Malayan Infantry Brigade
- Battles/wars: World War II: Japanese invasion of Malaya; Malayan Emergency Malaysia-Indonesia Confrontation

Tunku Osman bin Tunku Mohd Jewa (24 November 1919 – 19 April 1994) was the first Malaysian Armed Forces Chief of Staff. He was a nephew of Tunku Abdul Rahman, Malaysia's first Prime Minister as well as a cousin of Sultan Abdul Halim, Tunku Abdul Malik, Tunku Annuar and Sultan Sallehuddin since their fathers and Tunku Abdul Rahman were brothers (paternal half siblings). General Tunku Osman was known for his strong principles and self-discipline as well as highly respected by the rank and file of the army.

== Background ==
Tunku Osman received his early education at Hutchings School, Penang and later enrolled into the Sultan Abdul Hamid College (SAHC), Alor Star, Kedah. In March 1935, he furthered his studies at the Bristol Grammar School, England. There, he was taken care of and guided by Reginald James MacGregor. When the war broke in Europe, Tunku Osman showed his interest in joining the armed forces when Reginald James MacGregor's sons joined the Royal Air Force.

== Career highlights ==
From April to August 1942, Tunku Osman trained with the Gloucester Regiment as a recruit and later joined the 80th Reconnaissance Regiment. He was then sent to undergo cadet training at the Highland Fieldcraff Centre in Scotland. He underwent further training at Bovington and was seconded to the Royal Armoured Car Regiment. In 1944, he entered the OCTU at Barmouth, Wales in December 1944 to undergo training as a cadet officer.

In 1945, Tunku Osman joined the Force 136 and was commissioned as second lieutenant (May 1945) and was absorbed into the General List. He continued parachute training and investigations at Calcutta, India. He spearheaded the Malay Guerrilla Group when Force 136 was abolished after surrender of Japan.

In 1946, Tunku Osman joined the British Military Administration (BMA) in Malaya and served in the British Army in Malaya. In 1947 Tunku Osman joined the Royal Malay Regiment (1 February 1947) and was commissioned as lieutenant and assigned to the 2nd Battalion Malay Regiment. He was promoted to captain in February 1951 and later to the rank of major in 1955. The same year, Tunku Osman was sent to attend a Senior Officers course at Devizes, Wiltshire. In 1958, Tunku Osman was assigned to the 6th Battalion and the 7th Malay Regiment as Assistant Commanding Officer.

In July 1958, Tunku Osman was promoted to lieutenant colonel and took command of the 2nd Battalion Malay Regiment. He was the first Malay commanding Officer of the battalion. In May 1960, Tunku Osman was promoted to the rank of colonel while he was attending the Joint Services Staff College and in June 1960 was promoted to brigadier general and took command of 2nd Malayan Infantry Brigade. In July 1961, Tunku Osman was made "Brigadier of The Army" at the Ministry of Defense.

=== Appointment as Chief-of-Staff of the Armed Forces ===
When General Tan Sri Sir Rodney Moore retired as the Chief of Staff of the Armed Forces, Tunku Osman was promoted to major general and appointed the Chief of Staff of the Armed Forces. He was the first Malayan to hold the highest rank in the Malaysian Armed Forces. Tunku Osman retired from his position on 24 November 1969.

== Honours ==
For his many services and contributions, he was conferred various medals and honours:

=== Honours of Malaysia ===
- Malaya
  - Companion of the Order of the Defender of the Realm (JMN) (1961)
- Malaysia
  - Commander of the Order of the Defender of the Realm (PMN) – Tan Sri (1964)
  - Recipient of the Malaysian Commemorative Medal (Gold) (PPM) (1965)
- Malaysian Armed Forces
  - Courageous Commander of the Most Gallant Order of Military Service (PGAT) (1986)
- Negeri Sembilan
  - Recipient of the Distinguished Conduct Medal (PPT) (1968)
- Pahang
  - Knight Companion of the Order of the Crown of Pahang (DIMP) – Dato' (1969)

=== Foreign Honours ===
- South Vietnam
  - Grand Officer of the National Order of Vietnam (1965)
- South Korea
  - Second Class of the Order of Diplomatic Service Merit
- The Philippines
  - Grand Cross (Datu) of the Order of Sikatuna
- Iran
  - Grand Commander of the Order of the Crown
- Ethiopian Empire
  - Grand Officer of the Order of the Star of Ethiopia
- Thailand
  - Knight Grand Cross of the Order of the White Elephant
- United Kingdom
  - Burma Star
  - Defence Medal
  - War Medal 1939–1945

== Death and burial ==
He died on 19 April 1994 and was buried near Tunku Abdul Rahman's grave at Kedah Royal Mausoleum at Langgar.
