= Utan Aji (state constituency) =

Perlis constituency

Defunct state constituency
- Legislature: Perlis State Legislative Assembly
- Constituency created: 1958
- Constituency abolished: 1995
- First contested: 1959
- Last contested: 1990

Utan Aji was a state constituency in Perlis, Malaysia, that was represented in the Perlis State Legislative Assembly from 1959 to 1995.

The state constituency was created in the 1958 redistribution and was mandated to return a single member to the Perlis State Legislative Assembly under the first past the post voting system.

== History ==
It was abolished in 1995 when it was redistributed.

=== Representation history ===
Members of the Legislative Assembly for Utan Aji
Assembly	No	Years	Member	Party
Constituency created
1st	N09	1959-1964	Syed Darus Syed Hashim	Alliance (UMNO)
2nd	N09	1964-1969	Taharim Ariffin	PMIP
		1969-1971	Assembly dissolved	
3rd	N09	1971-1973	Syed Darus Syed Hashim	Alliance (UMNO)
3rd	N09	1973-1974	Syed Darus Syed Hashim	BN (UMNO)
4th	N09	1974–1978	Syed Darus Syed Hashim	BN (UMNO)
5th	N09	1978-1982	Idrus Kassim	BN (UMNO)
6th	N09	1982–1986	Idrus Kassim	BN (UMNO)
7th	N10	1986-1990	Fadzil Mahmood	BN (UMNO)
8th	N10	1990–1995	Fadzil Mahmood	BN (UMNO)
Constituency abolished, split into Simpang Empat, Kayang and Tambun Tulang

== Election results ==
Perlis state election, 1990
Party	Candidate	Votes	%	∆%
BN	Fadzil Mahmood	2,708	64.49	▲0.18
S46	Idrus Kassim	1,491	35.51	▲35.51
Total valid votes		4,199	100.00	
Total rejected ballots		149		
Unreturned ballots		0		
Turnout		4,348	79.26	▲3.87
Registered electors		5,486		
Majority		1,217	28.98	▲0.37
BN hold		Swing		

Perlis state election, 1986
Party	Candidate	Votes	%	∆%
BN	Fadzil Mahmood	2,270	64.31	▼1.51
PAS	Ahmad Tajuddin Salleh	1,260	35.69	▲1.51
Total valid votes		3,530	100.00	
Total rejected ballots		113		
Unreturned ballots		0		
Turnout		3,643	75.39	▼4.16
Registered electors		4,832		
Majority		1,010	28.61	▼3.03
BN hold		Swing		

Perlis state election, 1982
Party	Candidate	Votes	%	∆%
BN	Idrus Kassim	3,029	65.82	▲9.42
PAS	Mohamad Noor	1,573	34.18	▼9.42
Total valid votes		4,602	100.00	
Total rejected ballots		129		
Unreturned ballots		0		
Turnout		4,731	79.55	▼1.23
Registered electors		5,947		
Majority		1,456	31.64	▲18.84
BN hold		Swing		

Perlis state election, 1978
Party	Candidate	Votes	%	∆%
BN	Idrus Kassim	2,273	56.40	▼5.32
PAS	Bakri Hashim	1,757	43.60	▲43.60
Total valid votes		4,030	100.00	
Total rejected ballots		193		
Unreturned ballots		0		
Turnout		4,223	80.78	▼0.33
Registered electors		5,228		
Majority		516	12.80	▼16.23
BN hold		Swing		{{{2}}}

Perlis state election, 1974
Party	Candidate	Votes	%	∆%
BN	Syed Darus Syed Hashim	2,096	61.72	▲11.50
Parti Sosialis Rakyat Malaysia	Saad Man	1,110	32.69	▲32.69
Independent	Yusof Osman	190	5.59	▲5.59
Total valid votes		3,396	100.00	
Total rejected ballots		365		
Unreturned ballots		0		
Turnout		3,761	81.11	▼0.23
Registered electors		4,637		
Majority		986	29.03	▲28.60
BN gain from Alliance		Swing		?

Perlis state election, 1969
Party	Candidate	Votes	%	∆%
Alliance	Syed Darus Syed Hashim	1,868	50.22	▲4.29
PMIP	Taharim Ariffin	1,852	49.78	▼4.29
Total valid votes		3,720	100.00	
Total rejected ballots		216		
Unreturned ballots		0		
Turnout		3,936	81.34	▼0.89
Registered electors		4,839		
Majority		16	0.43	▼7.71
Alliance gain from PMIP		Swing		?

Perlis state election, 1964
Party	Candidate	Votes	%	∆%
PMIP	Taharim Ariffin	1,680	54.07	▲9.58
Alliance	Syed Darus Syed Hashim	1,427	45.93	▼9.58
Total valid votes		3,107	100.00	
Total rejected ballots		188		
Unreturned ballots		0		
Turnout		3,295	82.23	▲3.98
Registered electors		4,007		
Majority		253	8.14	▼2.87
PMIP gain from Alliance		Swing		?

Perlis state election, 1959
Party	Candidate	Votes	%
Alliance	Syed Darus Syed Hashim	1,366	55.51
PMIP	Ahmad Salleh	1,095	44.49
Total valid votes		2,461	100.00
Total rejected ballots		61	
Unreturned ballots		0	
Turnout		2,522	78.25
Registered electors		3,223	
Majority		271	11.01
This was a new constituency created.
