= Reginald James MacGregor =

British author (1887–1961)

Reginald James McGregor (16 August 1887 – 23 January 1961) was a British author of children's literature who wrote numerous books and plays between the 1920s and 1950s, as RJ McGregor. His early books had Far Eastern settings. His most successful books were The Young Detectives and its sequels. These books charted the adventures of a family where the children had the same names as his children.

Born in Bristol, he was the Headmaster of Bristol Grammar Preparatory School, and was a great influence on the many pupils who passed through the school, including Tunku Osman Tunku Mohammad Jewa.

In 1975, the Dunham Massey Thespians put on productions of four of his plays: The Dyspeptic Ogre, The Caravan, Take Your Pick and Twixt Eleven And Twelve.

== Bibliography ==
- The Monkey-God's Secret etc. - first edition published by Hutchison & Co in 1924 (254 pages)
- The Laughing Pirate - first edition published by Richards Press in 1927 (260 pages)
- The Secret Jungle - first edition published by the Sheldon Press in 1928 (160 pages)
- The Jungle Mystery - first edition published by Richards Press in 1928 (250 pages), illustrator unknown
- The Secret Temple (and other tales by various authors)- first edition published by Sheldon Press in 1932 (192 pages)
- The Young Detectives - first edition published by Burns, Oates & Co in 1934 (244 pages). A Puffin edition was published first in 1948 (199 pages), illustrated by William Grimmond. Translations were also published in Hebrew and Polish.
- The Secret of Dead Man's Cove - first edition published by Burns Oates and Co in 1937 (240 pages), illustrated by Edith Brier. A Puffin edition was published first in 1948 (200 pages). This was a sequel to The Young Detectives.
- The Laughing Raider - first edition published by University of London Press in 1937 (208 pages)
- The Dragon and the Mosquito, and other stories - first edition published by Burns, Oates & Co in 1938 (84 pages), illustrated by Frank Rogers
- A Sense of Honour - first published by Frederick Muller in 1938
- Chi-lo the Admiral - first edition published by Faber & Faber in 1940 (189 pages), illustrated by Irene Hawkins
- Harris v Snagglesmith - first edition published by Oxford University Press in 1940 (21 pages)
- Something Always Happens - first edition by Oxford University Press in 1940
- The Secret Forest - first published by University of London Press:Bickley in 1942 (96 pages). Another edition was published by University of London Press: London; Antwerp in 1948
- The Adventures of Grump - first edition published by Faber and Faber in 1946 (164 pages), illustrated by A E Kennedy
- Knights of the Skies - first edition published by Hutchison books for Young People in 1947 (192 pages)
- Chi-lo the General - first edition published by Faber and Faber in 1947 (176 pages), illustrated by Philip Hepworth. This was a sequel to Chi-lo the Admiral
- Young Detectives Incorporated - first edition by T.V. Boardman in 1947 (176 pages), illustrated by Jean Davies
- The Secret of Hangman's Wood - first edition published by T.V. Boardman & Co in 1948 (196 pages)
- Jungle Holiday - first edition published by T.V.Boardman & Co in 1950 (206 pages)
- The Secret of Smugglers' Wood - This is a rewrite of The Secret of Hangman's Wood. This version was first published as a Puffin edition in 1957 (239 pages), illustrated by Elizabeth Andrewes
- Indian Delight - first edition published by the University of London Press in 1958 (46 pages), illustrated by Brian Wildsmith
- The Warrior's Treasure - first edition published by University of London Press in 1962 (112 pages), illustrated by Brian Wildsmith
- The Musical Detectives (written with Irene Gass) (Note: Irene Gass (1885–1968) was an English school teacher and writer of children's books, many of them on musical subjects. The daughter of a Congregational minister, she also wrote the words for several hymns and Christmas carols as well as Eric Thiman's Christmas cantata Flower of Bethlehem. She taught at Bristol Grammar School for most of her working life.) - first edition published by Oxford University Press in 1950 (147 pages), illustrated by Valerie Sweet

Plays per the British Library catalogue:

- Nothing Ever Happens - a play in one act, published by the Oxford University Press in 1938
- A Watching Brief - a one-act play for boys, published by Sir Isaac Pitman & Sons in 1950
- Ancient and Modern - a comedy in one act, published by Sir Isaac Pitman & Sons in 1950
- The Little Major - a one-act play for boys, published by Sir Isaac Pitman & Sons in 1950
- The Mandarin's Hat - a comedy in one act, published by Sir Isaac Pitman & Sons in 1950
- Take your Pick - a one-act play, published by Sir Isaac Pitman & Sons in 1950
- 'Twixt Eleven and Twelve, published by Sir Isaac Pitman & Sons in 1950
- Six One-Act Plays - (The Mandarin's Hat, Take your Pick, 'Twixt Eleven and Twelve, The Little Major, Ancient and Modern, A Watching Brief), published by Sir Isaac Pitman & Sons in 1961

Plays published within compendiums

- Opportunity - a play in one act, within Plays Without Fees selected by John Hampden, published by Thomas Nelson & Sons in 1935
