= Karnail Singh Nijhar =

Malaysian politician (1936–2021)

Yang Berbahagia Tan Sri Karnail Singh PSM SPMJ JMN
- ਕਰਨੈਲ ਸਿੰਘ ਨੇਜਾਰ

Parliamentary Secretary of International Trade and Industry
- In office 1990–1991
- Preceded by: Himself
- Succeeded by: Subramaniam Sinniah

Parliamentary Secretary of Trade and Industry
- In office 1989–1990
- Succeeded by: Himself

Faction represented in Dewan Rakyat
- 1999–2008: Barisan Nasional

Faction represented in Dewan Negara
- 1985–1991: Barisan Nasional

Personal details
- Born: Karnail Singh Nijhar s/o Amar Singh; 2 July 1936 Pengkalan Hulu, Perak, British Malaya (now Malaysia)
- Died: 15 June 2021 (aged 84) Petaling Jaya, Selangor, Malaysia
- Resting place: Xiao En Memorial Park, Nilai, Negeri Sembilan
- Citizenship: (Malaysia) Malaysian
- Party: Malaysian Indian Congress (MIC)
- Other political affiliations: Barisan Nasional (BN)
- Spouse: Molina Kaur Nijhar
- Children: 2
- Education: University Malaya
- Occupation: Member of Parliament
- Profession: Politician, economist, educationist and entrepreneur

Karnail Singh Nijhar s/o Amar Singh (Punjabi: ਕਰਨੈਲ ਸਿੰਘ ਨੇਜਾਰ, romanized: Karanaila Sigha Nējāra; 2 July 1936 – 15 June 2021) was a Malaysian politician who served as Member of Parliament (MP) for Subang from November 1999 to March 2008 and Parliamentary Secretary in the Ministry of International Trade and Industry from 1989 to 1991. He was a member and had served as Vice-President of the Malaysian Indian Congress (MIC), a component party of the ruling Barisan Nasional (BN) coalition.

== Early life and education ==
Nijhar was born in Pengkalan Hulu, Perak, on 2 July 1936, on a bullock cart somewhere between Kroh and Kelian Intan. His father, Amar Singh, an immigrant from Punjab, moved to the Malaya in 1926 as a labourer in Rahman Hydraulic Tin Mine. Growing up, Nijhar lived in a kampung house without basic amenities and depended on wells for water and Hindu temples for free meals. He never owned a pair of shoes as a kid and was illiterate until the age of nine.

While a student at St Xavier's Institution in Penang, he earned money as a ball boy at clubs with tennis courts. He continued to excel at school however, and between 1947 and 1954 received high scores on examinations.

== Early career ==
Before he joined politics as a MIC member in 1974, he was a lecturer in economics at the University of Malaya and one of two Indians with a PhD in economics in Malaysia at the time. The Malaysian government sought his help for various initiatives during his early years as an academic, such as for the development of "academic staff salaries for Malaysian universities" for the Justice Harun Hashim Commission. Arshad Ayub, director of Institut Teknologi Mara, engaged him as a part-time lecturer and to help develop the curriculum for the school of business administration.

== Politics ==
Nijhar was the highest-ranking Punjabi and Sikh in the MIC, since MIC President V. T. Sambanthan's time in 1955, to hold any national-level portfolios in the Tamil-dominated party even as a Punjabi Sikh who spoke no Tamil. He was one of seven MPs from the MIC, causing him to be a minority within a minority. In 1980, began to be a close confidante of then MIC President Samy Velu, he was appointed by as Chairman of the Economic Bureau and Education Bureau of MIC where he had contributed setting-up the MIC's educational arm, Maju Institute of Educational Development (MIED). In 1981, he started to gain stature within the MIC, first as a central working committee (CWC) member and later as treasurer-general for nine years, secretary-general for four years, and vice-president for nine years.

He was appointed a Senator in 1985, the first time MIC nominated a Punjabi Sikh for the Senate and the second Punjabi Sikh in Malaysia's history to sit in the Senate, after Senator Paramjit Singh, president of People’s Progressive Party (PPP). He was re-appointed for the second-term Senatorship in 1988. Around this time, he was appointed parliamentary secretary to the ministry of trade and industry during which time he also served as a member of the first National Economic Consultative Council.

In the 1999 Malaysian general election, he joined Karpal Singh of the opposition Democratic Action Party (DAP) to be one of two Punjabi Sikhs elected in the Parliament. While an MP, he sat on the Public Accounts Committee (PAC) on National Integration, where he aimed to represent Malays and Indians in Subang and the country. In 2005, he questioned the validity of a memorandum of the DAP Johor State Committee, suggesting that it didn't take into account the view of Malay and Indian communities, and criticized the DAP. He won the parliamentary seat of Subang in Selangor twice in 1999 general election and 2004 general election before he was dropped as a candidate for the 2008 general election, where the BN candidate replacement for the constituency, S. Murugeson was defeated by the candidate from People's Justice Party (PKR), Sivarasa Rasiah.

Nijhar had resigned as MIC Vice-President following a heated row with party chief Samy Vellu in 2008. His last position held in CWC, was the MIC Discipline Committee after being replaced by the new MIC President G. Palanivel in 2015.

== Business ==
Nijhar left politics at 72. He had run with his son, Rabin a security company, Cisco (M) Sdn Bhd which he acquired in 1979.

== Personal life ==
Nijhar married lecturer Molina Kaur Nijhar. The couple has a daughter Premeeta Kaur Nijhar and son Rabinder Singh Nijhar. They had two children.

== Death ==
Nijhar died on 15 June 2021 after having a stroke. His final rites were performed along with a service held among close family members at his home in Bukit Pantai, followed by cremation at Xiao En Memorial Park in Nilai the next day.

== Election results ==
Parliament of Malaysia
Year	Constituency	Candidate	Votes	Pct	Opponent(s)	Votes	Pct	Ballots cast	Majority	Turnout
1999	P107 Subang	Karnail Singh (MIC)	36,137	55.49%	Irene Fernandez (keADILan)	28,985	44.51%	67,847	7,152	73.11%
2004	P107 Subang	Karnail Singh (MIC)	32,941	65.33%	Mohd Nasir Hashim (PKR)^{1}	17,481	34.67%	52,017	15,460	75.67%

Note: ^{1} Mohd Nasir Hashim amid contesting under the PKR ticket in the 2004 election, is a member of PSM.

== Honours ==
=== Honours of Malaysia ===
- Malaysia
  - Companion of the Order of the Defender of the Realm (JMN) (1980)
  - Commander of the Order of Loyalty to the Crown of Malaysia (PSM) – Tan Sri (1997)
- Johor
  - Knight Grand Commander of the Order of the Crown of Johor (SPMJ) – Dato'

== Bibliography ==
In June 2016, he released an autobiography narrated to his daughter Premeeta, titled "The Bullock Cart Boy".

- The Bullock Cart Boy (2016) ISBN 978-967-415-369-4

== See also ==
- Subang (federal constituency)
- Members of the Dewan Negara, 6th Malaysian Parliament
- Members of the Dewan Negara, 7th Malaysian Parliament
- Members of the Dewan Negara, 8th Malaysian Parliament
