= Lee Boon Chim =

Malaysian politician

Lee Boon Chim (1926–1998) was a Malaysian businessman and a pioneer of standard Malaysia rubber, who helped guide Malaysian rubber into becoming a valuable international commodity. He was also the Chairman of the Kuala Lumpur Commodity Exchange and later a Senator in the Malaysian Senate, participating in various government activities.

== Personal life ==
Lee Boon Chim was born and went to school in Singapore. He was a distant relative of the philanthropist Lee Kong Chian. He went to Cheklang University to read history, but his studies were interrupted by the Civil War.

He married Puan Sri Choi Lai Wah and had five children. He was an avid connoisseur of cigar and pipe smoking, and eventually succumbed to lung cancer. He also suffered from diabetes and Parkinson's disease. He died peacefully in London in 1998, where he spent his last days surrounded by his family. He often visited Kew Gardens in England, where the initial rubber seeds collected by Henry Wickham from Brazil were germinated before export to British Malaya, Singapore and Ceylon.

== Career ==
Following an apprenticeship as a clerk, he was appointed in 1948 as the manager of Lee Rubber Co Ltd in Kuala Lumpur and was later promoted to managing director of Lee Rubber (Selangor) Sdn Bhd in 1962.

He was appointed as the Chairman of the KL commodity exchange, the first futures exchange in Malaysia and all of Southeast Asia. Amongst his other posts were the President of the Federation of Rubber Trade Associations and board member on the Malaysian Rubber Exchange & Licensing Board.

Lee Boon Chim was involved in all aspects of the industry, including trading, research and development, marketing and management. In 1964 he pioneered the commercial production of Technically Specified Natural Rubber (TSR) and his efforts culminated in the first production of TSR, which later evolved into Standard Malaysia Rubber (SMR) in 1965, which was an industry milestone resulting in a method of grading rubber quality (by ash, nitrogen, dirt and volatile substance content), which revolutionised the industry; for the first time, allowing buyers to choose the quality of rubber they needed. The standard was later adopted and imitated by many other natural rubber producing countries to grade their own national rubber (SIR, STR etc.).

He was a founder member of the Institution of the Rubber Industry (Malaysia), now the Plastics & Rubber Institute, and an Honorary Life Vice President.

In his later years, he was appointed a Senator in the Malaysian Senate.

== Awards ==
He has been honored twice by Yang Dipertuan Agong, the King of Malaysia: he was a Companion of the Order of the Crown of Malaysia - Johan Setia Mahkota (JSM) in 1969 and the Commander of the Order of the Crown of Malaysia - Panglima Setia Mahkota (PSM) in 1976.

He has also received an Honorary Doctorate in Law from the University of Malaya (1971) and the 1992 Gold Medal from the Malaysian Institute of Chemistry (IKM).
