= Malaysia Derivatives Exchange =

The Malaysia Derivatives Exchange (MDEX), also known as Malaysian Distribution Exchange, is a limited share company formed during June 2001 in Malaysia through the merger of the Kuala Lumpur Options and Financial Futures Exchange (KLOFFE) and the Commodity and Monetary Exchange of Malaysia (COMMEX Malaysia). It is a subsidiary of the Kuala Lumpur Stock Exchange (KLSE).

MDEX is fully electronic, using the KLOFFE Automated Trading System (KATS). The exchange's most active contract is crude palm oil futures. It also trades futures and options on the KLSE Composite Index, three-month KLIBOR (Kuala Lumpur Interbank Offered Rate) futures, and five-year Malaysian Government securities futures. All derivatives except crude palm oil are cash settled. The KATS system has two trading sessions, separated by a lunch break. Trading is done Monday through Friday, from 8:45 a.m. to 6 p.m.

== History ==
The Kuala Lumpur Commodity Exchange (KLCE) was the first futures exchange in Malaysia and all of Southeast Asia, established in 1980. The exchange moved to Dayabumi Complex in June 1984. In 1996, the Malaysian Monetary Exchange was incorporated to assist in the exchange's expansion to financial futures. The Commodity and Monetary Exchange of Malaysia (COMEX) succeeded the KLCE and the Malaysia Commodity Exchange, a subsidiary of the former KLCE. It merged with the Kuala Lumpur Options and Financial Futures Exchange (KLOFFE) in December 2000 and formed the Malaysia Derivatives Exchange (MDEX).

== Strategic Partnership ==
The MDEX entered a partnership with Chicago Mercantile Exchange to improve accessibility to its global offerings. This partnership includes licensing of the settlement prices of the crude palm oil futures (FCPO) to establish Malaysia as the global benchmark for the commodity.

The partnership involves swap of ownership. Chicago Mercantile Exchange holds 25% of the equity stake, while the remaining is held by Bursa Malaysia Berhad.

== See also ==
- List of stock exchanges in the Commonwealth of Nations
