= Ahmad Othman =

Syrian footballer (born 1999)

Personal information
- Date of birth: 1 June 1999 (age 27)
- Place of birth: Syria
- Position: Midfielder

Senior career*
Years	Team	Apps	(Gls)
–2018	Wellington Olympic		
2018–2019	Tasman United	16	(8)
2019–2020	Wellington Phoenix Reserves	15	(6)
2020–2021	Hawke's Bay United	13	(3)
2022	North Wellington	16	(4)
2023–	Kingborough Lions United		
- * Club domestic league appearances and goals

Ahmad Othman (born 1 June 1999) is a New Zealand/ Kurdish, Syrian born footballer who plays as a striker for Wellington Marist.

== Early life ==
Othman was born in 1999 in Syria. He attended Wellington High School in New Zealand.

== Career ==
Othman started his career with New Zealand side Wellington Olympic. In 2018, he signed for New Zealand side Tasman United. In 2019, he signed for New Zealand side Wellington Phoenix Reserves. In 2020, he signed for New Zealand side Hawke's Bay United. In 2022, he signed for New Zealand side North Wellington. In 2023, he signed for New Zealand side Wellington Marist.

== Style of play ==
Othman mainly operates as a midfielder. He has been described as "while he has been shining as an attacking midfielder, Othman, is happy play any role".

== Personal life ==
Othman has a brother. He moved to New Zealand at the age of sixteen.
