= Abdul Hamid Bidin =

4th Chief of Defence Forces of Malaysia

Yang Berbahagia General (Rtd) Tan Sri Dato' Abdul Hamid Bidin PSM SPMK DIMP JMN PJK PMP
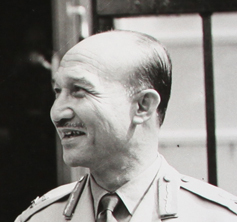

4th Chief of Defence Forces
- In office 25 November 1969 – 30 June 1970
- Monarchs: Ismail Nasiruddin Shah; Abdul Halim
- Prime Minister: Tunku Abdul Rahman; Abdul Razak Hussein
- Minister of Defence: Abdul Razak Hussein
- Preceded by: Tunku Osman
- Succeeded by: Ibrahim Ismail

4th Chief of Army
- In office 1 January 1964 – 24 November 1969
- Preceded by: Tunku Osman
- Succeeded by: Ungku Nazaruddin Ungku Mohamed

Personal details
- Born: 1 July 1918 Kampung Pianggu, Endau, Rompin, Pahang, Federated Malay States, British Malaya (now Malaysia)
- Died: 12 June 1996 (aged 77)
- Profession: Senior military officer

Military service
- Allegiance: Malaysia
- Branch/service: Malaysian Army
- Years of service: 1939–1970
- Rank: General
- Commands: Chief of Army (1964-1969); Chief of Defence Forces (1969–1970)

Abdul Hamid bin Bidin (1 July 1918 – 12 June 1996) was the 4th Chief of Defence Forces of Malaysia.

== Early life ==
Abdul Hamid bin Bidin was born on 1 July 1918 in Kampung Pianggu, Endau, Rompin, Pahang.

== Military career ==
He began his involvement in the military on 1 August 1939 when he underwent a 6-month recruit training in Port Dickson. General Hamid became the first local to become ADC (escort) of the British High Commissioner, Sir Henry Gurney in 1950. He was also honored to command the Third Brigade in Congo in the UN Peacekeeping Force from 10 March 1961 to 28 March 1962. After that, General Hamid was promoted to major general and held the post of Chief of Staff of the Army. He was later promoted again to lieutenant general (7 July 1966) and finally general (1 July 1968). He was appointed Chief of Defence Forces on 25 November 1969.

== Honours ==
- Malaya
  - Companion of the Order of the Defender of the Realm (JMN) (1961)
- Malaysia
  - Recipient of the Malaysian Commemorative Medal (Silver) (PPM) (1965)
  - Commander of the Order of Loyalty to the Crown of Malaysia (PSM) – Tan Sri (1966)
- Perak
  - Commander of the Order of the Perak State Crown (PMP) (1963)
- Kelantan
  - Knight Commander of the Order of the Crown of Kelantan (DPMK) – Dato' (1964)
  - Knight Grand Commander of the Order of the Crown of Kelantan (SPMK) – Dato' (1967)
- Pahang
  - Meritorious Service Medal (PJK) (1964)
  - Knight Companion of the Order of the Crown of Pahang (DIMP) – Dato' (1969)
