= Fadzil Mahmood =

Malaysian politician

Fadzil Mahmood (1937 – 9 June 2010) was a Malaysian politician who served as the Speaker of the Perlis State Assembly from 9 September 1986 until 4 October 1990 during the administration of Abdul Hamid Pawanteh as Menteri Besar of Perlis. He represented Utan Aji in the assembly. Fadzil also served as a state executive councillor from 1990 to 1995.

Fadzil's wife, Datin Fatimah Ismail, died on 6 May 2010, at the age of 71. He was soon after admitted to Tuanku Fauziah Hospital for a heart ailment on 2 June 2010. Fadzil returned home from the hospital on 8 June. He died at his home in Kampung Surau, Utan Aji, Kangar, Perlis, Malaysia, at 3:30 a.m. on 9 June 2010, at the age of 73.

Fadzil was survived by two daughters, Faniza and Fazlin; two sons, Faiz and Faisal; and five grandchildren.
