= Lee Loy Seng =

Malaysian businessman

Yang Berbahagia Tan Sri Dato' Seri Lee Loy Seng PSM SPMP DPMP JP
- 李萊生
- Born: 22 August 1921; Menglembu, Ipoh, Perak, Federated Malay States
- Died: 22 November 1993 (aged 72)

Lee Loy Seng

Chinese name
- Traditional Chinese: 李萊生
- Simplified Chinese: 李莱生
Transcriptions
Standard Mandarin
- Hanyu Pinyin: Lǐ Láishēng
Yue: Cantonese
- Jyutping: Lei5 Loi4 Saang1
Southern Min
- Hokkien POJ: Lí Lâi-seng
- Tâi-lô: Lí Lâi-sing

Lee Loy Seng (simplified Chinese: 李莱生; traditional Chinese: 李萊生; pinyin: Lǐ Láishēng; Jyutping: Lei5 Loi4 Saang1; Pe̍h-ōe-jī: Lí Lâi-seng; 22 August 1921 – 22 November 1993) was a Malaysian businessman who grew up in Ipoh, Malaysia.

== Biography ==
His father, Lee Meng Hin, was a tin-miner who gave the then Malayan economy a boost. His company was passed on to one of his sons, Lee Wan Seng, and the younger Loy Seng worked as an employee during the early years of his life. During the Malayan Emergency, many British firms and trading houses sold off their assets, including rubber plantations at very low prices. Lee saw the opportunity to invest in these lands, subsequently turning them into rubber plantations. With the price of rubber increasing immensely due to industrial rise, he built up his fast blossoming business. Lee founded the company Kuala Lumpur Kepong Berhad, which became and still is one of the leading plantation owning companies in Malaysia.

Lee was a member of Malaysian Chinese Association (MCA), president of Ipoh Municipal Council in 1976, and a senator from 1971 to 1980. From 1978 to 1992, he was the president of Perak Chinese Maternity Hospital (a private non-profit hospital that gives free treatment to the poor). He was the chairman of Multi-Purpose Holdings ran into financial difficulties in the mid-1980s, he was invited by MCA to return as a director on a board of prominent Chinese businessmen, headed by "Suger King" Robert Kuok, to restore it back to health. He was known for his philanthropy, and established the Lee Loy Seng Foundation to provide scholarships for Malaysian students to pursue tertiary education. He was also the benefactor of the Lucky Village Old Folks Home in Ipoh.

Lee was awarded the titles of Dato' (promoted to a Dato' Seri in 1989) in 1974 and Tan Sri in 1987.

His sons are considered to be in the top 20 richest people in Malaysia. Lee Oi Hian and Lee Hau Hian jointly have an estimated net worth of US$1.5bil in 2015.

== Honours ==
- Malaysia
  - Commander of the Order of Loyalty to the Crown of Malaysia (PSM) – Tan Sri (1978)
- Perak
  - Justice of the Peace of Perak (JP) (1972)
  - Knight Commander of the Order of the Perak State Crown (DPMP) – Dato' (1974)
  - Knight Grand Commander of the Order of the Perak State Crown (SPMP) – Dato' Seri (1989)
