= Next Kedah state election =

General election for the 16th Kedah State Legislative Assembly

- On or before 24 November 2028

All 36 seats in the Legislative Assembly 19 seats needed for a majority
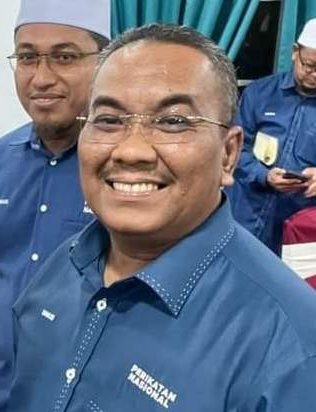

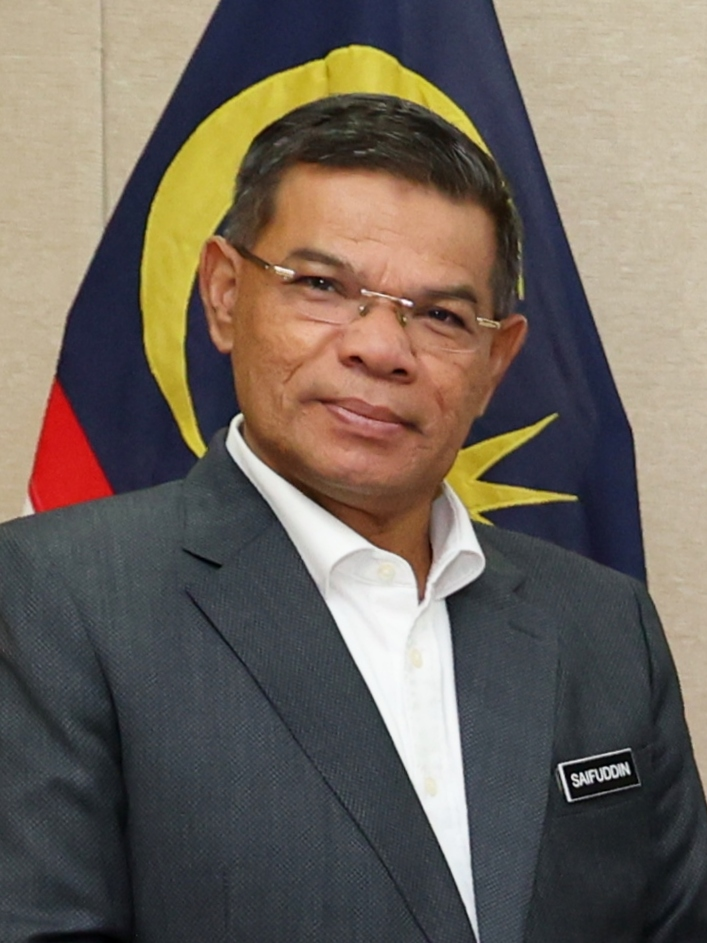
| | | | BN |
| Leader | Muhammad Sanusi Muhammad Nor | Saifuddin Nasution Ismail | Mahdzir Khalid |
| Party | Malaysian Islamic Party | People's Justice Party (Malaysia) | United Malays National Organisation |
| Alliance | Perikatan Nasional | Pakatan Harapan | Barisan Nasional |
| Leader since | 17 May 2020 | 7 February 2025 |
| Leader's seat | Jeneri | Not Contested | Not Contested |
| Last election | 33 seats, 68.93% | 3 seats, 20.10% | 0 seats |
| Current seats | 33 | 3 | 0 |
| Seats needed | Steady | ▲16 | ▲19 |
Incumbent Menteri Besar of Kedah
Muhammad Sanusi Muhammad Nor
Perikatan Nasional-Malaysian Islamic Party

The next Kedah state election, will elect members of the 16th Kedah State Legislative Assembly. It must be held on or before 25 November 2028, pursuant to clause 53(3) of the Constitution of Kedah or unless dissolved earlier by the Sultan of Kedah on the advice of the Menteri Besar of Kedah.

All 36 seats in the Kedah State Legislative Assembly will be contested. The election will determine whether the incumbent Perikatan Nasional government under Menteri Besar Muhammad Sanusi Md Nor retains power, or whether opposition coalitions such as Barisan Nasional or Pakatan Harapan can secure a majority.

== Constituencies ==
Electoral map of Kedah, showing all 36 constituencies

== Composition before dissolution ==
| Government | | | | Opposition |
| PN | | | | PH |
| 33 | | | | 3 |
| 21 | 9 | 1 | 2 | 2 | 1 |
| PAS | BERSATU | GERAKAN | WAWASAN | PKR | DAP |

== Background ==
=== Previous election ===
The previous state election was held on 12 August 2023 following the dissolution of the 15th State Legislative Assembly. Perikatan Nasional won a two-thirds supermajority, securing 33 of 36 seats.

== Electoral system ==
Elections in Malaysia are conducted at the federal and state levels. Federal elections elect members of the Dewan Rakyat, the lower house of Parliament, while state elections in each of the 13 states elect members of their respective state legislative assembly. As Malaysia follows the Westminster system of government, the head of government (Prime Minister at the federal level and the Menteri Besar/Chief Ministers/Premier at the state level) is the person who commands the confidence of the majority of members in the respective legislature – this is normally the leader of the party or coalition with the majority of seats in the legislature.

The Legislative Assembly currently consists of 36 members, known as Members of the Legislative Assembly (MLAs), that are elected for five-year terms. Each MLA is elected from a single-member constituencies using the first-past-the-post voting system; each constituency contains approximately an equal number of voters. If one party obtains a majority of seats, then that party is entitled to form the government, with its leader becoming the Premier. In the event of a hung parliament, where no single party obtains the majority of seats, the government may still form through a coalition or a confidence and supply agreement with other parties. In practice, coalitions and alliances in Malaysia, and by extension, in Sarawak, generally persist between elections, and member parties do not normally contest for the same seats.

The voting age is currently 18. Elections are conducted by the Election Commission of Malaysia, which is under the jurisdiction of the Prime Minister's Department. Malaysia practices automatic voter registration but does not practice compulsory voting.

== Preparations ==
=== Political parties ===
Perikatan Nasional is expected to defend its governing mandate, while Barisan Nasional aims to regain influence after losing control in 2018. Pakatan Harapan may also expand its challenge in Malay-majority constituencies.

Seat negotiations among opposition parties are expected to play a major role in determining electoral competitiveness.

== Departing incumbents ==
The following members of the 15th Kedah State Legislative Assembly did not seek re-election.

| No. | State Constituency | Departing MLA | Coalition (Party) | Date confirmed | First elected | Reason |

== Candidates ==
Candidate announcements are expected closer to nomination day.

| No. | Parliamentary constituency | No. | State Constituency | Number of Voters | Constituency Largest Ethnic | Incumbent Member | Incumbent Coalition (Party) | Political coalitions and respective candidates and coalitions | | | | | | | | | |
| No. | Parliamentary constituency | No. | State Constituency | Number of Voters | Constituency Largest Ethnic | Incumbent Member | Incumbent Coalition (Party) | Perikatan Nasional (PN) | | Pakatan Harapan (PH) | | Barisan Nasional (BN) | | Others | | | |
| No. | Parliamentary constituency | No. | State Constituency | Number of Voters | Constituency Largest Ethnic | Incumbent Member | Incumbent Coalition (Party) | Candidate name | Party | Candidate name | Party | Candidate name | Party | Candidate name | Party | Candidate name | Party |
|---|---|---|---|---|---|---|---|---|---|---|---|---|---|---|---|---|---|
| P004 | Langkawi | N01 | Ayer Hangat | | Malay | Shamsilah Siru | PN (BERSATU) | | WAWASAN | | AMANAH | | UMNO | | | | |
| P004 | Langkawi | N02 | Kuah | | Malay | Amar Pared Mahamud | PN (BERSATU) | | WAWASAN | | PKR | | UMNO | | | | |
| P005 | Jerlun | N03 | Kota Siputeh | | Malay | Mohd Ashraf Mustaqim Badrul Munir | PN (BERSATU) | | WAWASAN | | AMANAH | | UMNO | | | | |
| P005 | Jerlun | N04 | Ayer Hitam | | Malay | Azhar Ibrahim | PN (PAS) | | PAS | | PKR | | UMNO | | | | |
| P006 | Kubang Pasu | N05 | Bukit Kayu Hitam | | Malay | Halimaton Shaadiah Saad | PN (BERSATU) | | WAWASAN | | PKR | | UMNO | | | | |
| P006 | Kubang Pasu | N06 | Jitra | | Malay | Haim Hilman Abdullah | PN (PAS) | | PAS | | PKR | | UMNO | | | | |
| P007 | Padang Terap | N07 | Kuala Nerang | | Malay | Mohamad Yusoff @ Munir Zakaria | PN (PAS) | | PAS | | AMANAH | | UMNO | | | | |
| P007 | Padang Terap | N08 | Pedu | | Malay | Mohd Radzi Md Amin | PN (PAS) | | PAS | | PKR | | UMNO | | | | |
| P008 | Pokok Sena | N09 | Bukit Lada | | Malay | Salim Mahmood | PN (PAS) | | PAS | | AMANAH | | UMNO | | | | |
| P008 | Pokok Sena | N10 | Bukit Pinang | | Malay | Wan Romani Wan Salim | PN (PAS) | | PAS | | PKR | | UMNO | | | | |
| P008 | Pokok Sena | N11 | Derga | | Malay | Muhamad Amri Wahab | PN (BERSATU) | | WAWASAN | | DAP | | UMNO | | | | |
| P009 | Alor Setar | N12 | Suka Menanti | | Malay | Dzowahir Ab Ghani | PN (WAWASAN) | | WAWASAN | | PKR | | UMNO | | | | |
| P009 | Alor Setar | N13 | Kota Darul Aman | | Chinese | Teh Swee Leong | PH (DAP) | | GERAKAN | | DAP | | MCA | | | | |
| P009 | Alor Setar | N14 | Alor Mengkudu | | Malay | Muhamad Radhi Mat Din | PN (PAS) | | PAS | | AMANAH | | UMNO | | | | |
| P010 | Kuala Kedah | N15 | Anak Bukit | | Malay | Rashidi Razak | PN (PAS) | | PAS | | PKR | | UMNO | | | | |
| P010 | Kuala Kedah | N16 | Kubang Rotan | | Malay | Mohd Salleh Saidin | PN (BERSATU) | | WAWASAN | | AMANAH | | UMNO | | | | |
| P010 | Kuala Kedah | N17 | Pengkalan Kundor | | Malay | Mardhiyyah Johari | PN (PAS) | | PAS | | AMANAH | | UMNO | | | | |
| P011 | Pendang | N18 | Tokai | | Malay | Mohd Hayati Othman | PN (PAS) | | PAS | | AMANAH | | UMNO | | | | |
| P011 | Pendang | N19 | Sungai Tiang | | Malay | Abdul Razak Khamis | PN (WAWASAN) | | WAWASAN | | PKR | | UMNO | | | | |
| P012 | Jerai | N20 | Sungai Limau | | Malay | Mohd Azam Abd Samat | PN (PAS) | | PAS | | AMANAH | | UMNO | | | | |
| P012 | Jerai | N21 | Guar Chempedak | | Malay | Abdul Ghafar Saad | PN (BERSATU) | | WAWASAN | | PKR | | UMNO | | | | |
| P012 | Jerai | N22 | Gurun | | Malay | Baddrol Bakhtiar | PN (PAS) | | PAS | | PKR | | MCA | | | | |
| P013 | Sik | N23 | Belantek | | Malay | Ahmad Sulaiman | PN (PAS) | | PAS | | AMANAH | | UMNO | | | | |
| P013 | Sik | N24 | Jeneri | | Malay | Muhammad Sanusi Md Nor | PN (PAS) | | PAS | | PKR | | UMNO | | | | |
| P014 | Merbok | N25 | Bukit Selambau | | Malay | Azizan Hamzah | PN (PAS) | | PAS | | PKR | | MIC | | | | |
| P014 | Merbok | N26 | Tanjong Dawai | | Malay | Hanif Ghazali | PN (PAS) | | PAS | | AMANAH | | UMNO | | | | |
| P015 | Sungai Petani | N27 | Pantai Merdeka | | Malay | Shahrir Long | PN (PAS) | | PAS | | AMANAH | | UMNO | | | | |
| P015 | Sungai Petani | N28 | Bakar Arang | | Malay | Adam Loh Wei Chai | PH (PKR) | | GERAKAN | | PKR | | MCA | | | | |
| P015 | Sungai Petani | N29 | Sidam | | Malay | Bau Wong Bau Ek | PH (PKR) | | WAWASAN | | PKR | | UMNO | | | | |
| P016 | Baling | N30 | Bayu | | Malay | Mohd Taufik Yaacob | PN (BERSATU) | | WAWASAN | | AMANAH | | UMNO | | | | |
| P016 | Baling | N31 | Kupang | | Malay | Najmi Ahmad | PN (PAS) | | PAS | | AMANAH | | UMNO | | | | |
| P016 | Baling | N32 | Kuala Ketil | | Malay | Mansor Zakaria | PN (PAS) | | PAS | | PKR | | UMNO | | | | |
| P017 | Padang Serai | N33 | M erbau Pulas | | Malay | Siti Ashah Ghazali | PN (PAS) | | PAS | | AMANAH | | UMNO | | | | |
| P017 | Padang Serai | N34 | Lunas | | Malay | Khairul Anuar Ramli | PN (BERSATU) | | WAWASAN | | PKR | | MIC | | | | |
| P018 | Kulim-Bandar Baharu | N35 | Kulim | | Malay | Wong Chia Zhen | PN (GERAKAN) | | GERAKAN | | PKR | | MCA | | | | |
| P018 | Kulim-Bandar Baharu | N36 | Bandar Baharu | | Malay | Mohd Suffian Yusoff | PN (PAS) | | PAS | | AMANAH | | UMNO | | | | |

== Opinion polls ==
Opinion polling has yet to intensify significantly ahead of the election.
