= Speaker of the Kedah State Legislative Assembly =

Presiding officer of the legislature of Kedah

- Yang di-Pertua Dewan Undangan Negeri Kedah
- Coat of arms of Kedah
- Incumbent; Zubir Ahmad since 25 September 2023
- Kedah State Legislative Assembly
- Style: Yang Berhormat; Tuan Yang di-Pertua (formal); Tuan Speaker/Tuan Pengerusi (informal and within the assembly)
- Member of: Committee of Selection, Committee of Meeting Rules, Committee of House, Committee of Rights and Freedoms
- Reports to: Kedah State Legislative Assembly
- Seat: Level 4, Blok E, Wisma Darul Aman, Alor Setar, Kedah
- Appointer: Elected by members of the Kedah State Legislative Assembly
- Term length: Elected at the start of each Kedah State Legislative Assembly, upon a vacancy
- Constituting instrument: Constitution of Kedah
- Inaugural holder: Arshad Tunku Ismail
- Formation: 23 May 1959; 67 years ago
- Deputy: Deputy Speaker of the Kedah State Legislative Assembly
- Website: mmk.kedah.gov.my

The Speaker of the Kedah State Legislative Assembly is the highest-ranking presiding officer in the Kedah State Legislative Assembly, the unicameral legislature of the Malaysian state of Kedah. They are responsible for convening sessions of the state's legislative body, organising debates, and examining the admissibility of petitions, bills and amendments. In the absence of the Speaker, the deputy will take their place. The speaker is selected through ballot in the first session of a new legislative assembly.

The incumbent Speaker is Zubir Ahmad. He was elected since 25 September 2023.

== Election ==
The Kedah State Legislative Assembly may from time to time elect a person of eligibility to become a Speaker of the assembly. A speaker may not be elected to be a Speaker unless he is a member or qualified to be a member of the legislative assembly. The speaker may resign at any time. He must vacate his office when either the legislative assembly first meet after a general election, or upon being disqualified to be a speaker, or upon the dissolution of the assembly, or on his ceasing to be a member of assembly other than because of the dissolution of the legislative assembly or ceased to be qualified of a member. A Deputy Speaker may also be chosen from any member of the legislative assembly.

== List of Speakers of the Kedah State Legislative Assembly ==
The following is the list of Speakers of the State Legislative Assembly since 1959:

Colour key (for political parties):
Alliance / Barisan Nasional Pakatan Rakyat Pakatan Harapan Perikatan Nasional

No.	Portrait	Name (Birth–Death) (Constituency)	Term of office			Party (Note: This column names only the Speaker's party. The state legislaltive assembly he heads may be a complex coalition of several parties and independents; those are not listed here.)	Election	Assembly
No.	Portrait	Name (Birth–Death) (Constituency)	Took office	Left office	Time in office	Party	Election	Assembly
1.		Arshad Tunku Ismail (?–?); MLA for Sala	1959	1964	5 years	Alliance (UMNO)	1959	1st
2.		Dato' Paduka Haji; Zainuddin Din (?–?); MLA for Bandar Bahru	1964	1969	5 years	Alliance (UMNO)	1964	2nd
3.		Dato' Paduka Haji; Salleh Ishak (?–?); MLA for Sungei Patani Luar	1969	1974	5 years	Alliance (UMNO)	1969	3rd
4.		Dato' Paduka Haji; Abdullah Ismail (?–?); MLA for Yan	1974	1982	8 years	BN (UMNO)	1974	4th
4.		Dato' Paduka Haji; Abdullah Ismail (?–?); MLA for Yan	1974	1982	8 years	BN (UMNO)	1978	5th
5.		Dato' Haji; Shaari Abu Bakar (?–?); MLA for Pendang	1982	1986	4 years	BN (UMNO)	1982	6th
6.		Dato' Haji; Seroji Haron (?–?); MLA for Bayu	1986	1990	4 years	BN (UMNO)	1986	7th
7.		Dato' Paduka Haji; Abdullah Ismail (?–?); Non-MLA	1990	1995	5 years	BN (UMNO)	1990	8th
8.		Dato' Haji; Zainol Md Isa (?–?); MLA for Kupang	1995	31 July 1998	3 years	BN (UMNO)	1995	9th
9.		Abdul Razak Hashim (?–?); MLA for Guar Chempedak	1998	1999	1 year	BN (UMNO)	–	9th
10.		Dato' Paduka Haji; Badruddin Amiruldin (b.1951); Non-MLA	1999	2004	5 years	BN (UMNO)	1999	10th
11.		Dato' Paduka; Md Rozai Shafian (1954–2024); Non-MLA	2004	2008	4 years	BN (UMNO)	2004	11th
12.		Dato' Dr. Abdul Isa Ismail (?–?); Non-MLA	2008	2013	5 years	PR (PAS)	2008	12th
13.		Dato' Paduka; Md Rozai Shafian (1954–2024); Non-MLA	2013	2018	5 years	BN (UMNO)	2013	13th
14.		Dato' Paduka; Ahmad Kassim (b.1963); Non-MLA	4 July 2018	15 August 2020	2 years, 43 days	PH (PKR)	2018	14th
15.		Dato'; Juhari Bulat (b.1957); MLA for Ayer Hangat	25 August 2020	28 June 2023	2 years, 308 days	PN (BERSATU)	–	14th
16.		Zubir Ahmad (b.1963); Non-MLA	25 September 2023	Incumbent	2 years, 349 days	PN (PAS)	2023	15th

== See also ==
- Kedah
- Kedah State Legislative Assembly
