= Md Rozai Shafian =

Malaysian politician (1954–2024)

Yang Berbahagia Dato' Paduka Md Rozai Shafian PJN DHMS DSDK JP BKM

11th & 13th Speaker of the Kedah State Legislative Assembly
- In office 2013–2018
- Monarchs: Abdul Halim; Sallehuddin
- Preceded by: Abdul Isa Ismail
- Succeeded by: Ahmad Kassim
- Constituency: Non-MLA
- In office 2004–2008
- Monarch: Abdul Halim
- Preceded by: Badruddin Amiruldin
- Succeeded by: Abdul Isa Ismail
- Constituency: Non-MLA

Deputy Speaker of the Kedah State Legislative Assembly
- In office 1999–2004
- Constituency: Sungai Tiang

Personal details
- Born: 12 March 1954 Kedah, Federation of Malaya (now Malaysia)
- Died: 26 February 2024 (aged 69) Hospital Sultanah Bahiyah, Alor Setar, Kedah
- Party: United Malays National Organisation (UMNO) (1996–2024)
- Other political affiliations: Barisan Nasional (BN) (1996–2024)
- Spouse: Khalijah Ghazali
- Children: 6

Md Rozai bin Shafian (12 March 1954 – 26 February 2024) was a Malaysian politician who served as Speaker of the Kedah State Legislative Assembly in two non-consecutive terms (2004–2008 and 2013–2018). He earlier represented Sungai Tiang in the Kedah State Legislative Assembly from 1999 to 2004. He was a member of United Malays National Organisation (UMNO), a component party of Barisan Nasional (BN).

== Political career ==
Md Rozai Shafian joined the UMNO in 1996. He was elected as the Sungai Tiang assemblyman in the 1999 state election and subsequently appointed as Speaker of the Kedah State Legislative Assembly from 2004 to 2008, and again from 2013 to 2018. He contested the Pendang parliamentary seat in the 2004 and 2008 general elections but was defeated on both by Mohd Hayati Othman of the PAS.

== Death ==
Md Rozai Shafian died on 26 February 2024 at the age of 69 at Sultanah Bahiyah Hospital.

== Election results ==
Kedah State Legislative Assembly
Year	Constituency	Candidate	Votes	Pct	Opponent(s)	Votes	Pct	Ballots cast	Majority	Turnout
1999	N19 Sungai Tiang	Md Rozai Shafian (UMNO)	11,039	56.47%	Abdullah Abdul Rahman (PAS)	8,509	43.53%	23,921	2,520	92.49%

Parliament of Malaysia
Year	Constituency	Candidate	Votes	Pct	Opponent(s)	Votes	Pct	Ballots cast	Majority	Turnout
2004	P011 Pendang	Md Rozai Shafian (UMNO)	24,380	49.95%	Mohd Hayati Othman (PAS)	24,430	50.05%	49,193	50	86.03%
2008	P011 Pendang	Md Rozai Shafian (UMNO)	23,238	45.97%	Mohd Hayati Othman (PAS)	27,311	54.03%	51,645	4,073	84.19%

== Honours ==
- Malaysia
  - Commander of the Order of Meritorious Service (PJN) – Datuk (2017)
- Kedah
  - Knight Commander of the Order of Loyalty to Sultan Abdul Halim Mu'adzam Shah (DHMS) – Dato' Paduka (2008)
  - Knight Companion of the Order of Loyalty to the Royal House of Kedah (DSDK) – Dato' (2005)
  - Justice of the Peace (JP) (1998)
  - Recipient of the Public Service Star (BKM)
