= Mohd Isa Shafie =

Malaysian politician

Yang Berbahagia Dato' Mohd Isa Shafie DSDK JP
- مُحَمَّد عِيسَى شَافِعِي

Member of the Kedah State Legislative Assembly for Belantek
- In office 9 May 2018 – 14 June 2023
- Preceded by: Mohd Tajuddin Abdullah (BN–UMNO)
- Succeeded by: Ahmad Sulaiman (PN–PAS)
- Majority: 3,795 (2018)
- In office 29 November 1999 – 8 March 2008
- Preceded by: Salleh Musa (BN–UMNO)
- Succeeded by: Mohd Tajuddin Abdullah (BN–UMNO)
- Majority: 525 (1999); 51 (2004)

Personal details
- Born: 1954 Sik, Kedah, Federation of Malaya (now Malaysia)
- Died: 14 June 2023 (aged 68–69) Sultan Abdul Halim Hospital, Sungai Petani, Kedah, Malaysia
- Party: Malaysian Islamic Party (PAS) (–2023)
- Other political affiliations: Barisan Alternatif (BA) (1999–2004); Pakatan Rakyat (PR) (2008–2015); Gagasan Sejahtera (GS) (2016–2020); Perikatan Nasional (PN) (2020–2023)
- Occupation: Politician

Mohd Isa bin Shafie (1954 – 14 June 2023) was a Malaysian politician who served as Member of the Kedah State Legislative Assembly (MLA) for Belantek from November 1999 to March 2008 and again from May 2018 to his death in June 2023. He was a member of the Malaysian Islamic Party (PAS), a component party of the Perikatan Nasional (PN) and formerly Gagasan Sejahtera (GS), Pakatan Rakyat (PR) and Barisan Alternatif (BA) coalitions.

== Death ==
Mohd Isa Shafie died on 14 June 2023 at the Sultan Abdul Halim Hospital due to bacterial infection in the heart, lungs and kidneys.

== Election results ==
Kedah State Legislative Assembly
Year	Constituency	Candidate	Votes	Pct	Opponent(s)	Votes	Pct	Ballots cast	Majority	Turnout
1999	N22 Belantek	Mohd Isa Shafie (PAS)	6,556	52.08%	Siti Meriam (UMNO)	6,031	47.92%	12,876	525	82.09%
2004	N23 Belantek	Mohd Isa Shafie (PAS)	7,310	50.18%	Md Salleh Ismail (UMNO)	7,259	49.82%	14,787	51	85.40%
2018	N23 Belantek	Mohd Isa Shafie (PAS)	9,600	50.52%	Tajuddin Abdullah (UMNO)	7,026	36.98%	19,372	2,574	85.20%
2018	N23 Belantek	Mohd Isa Shafie (PAS)	9,600	50.52%	Abdul Rashid Abdullah (AMANAH)	2,376	12.50%	19,372	2,574	85.20%

== Honours ==
- Kedah
  - Knight Companion of the Order of Loyalty to the Royal House of Kedah (DSDK) – Dato' (2022)
  - Justice of the Peace (JP) (2009)
