= Salmee Said =

Malaysian politician and dentist

Dr. Salmee Said SSS
- سلمي سعيد

Member of the Kedah State Executive Council
- In office 1 August 2018 – 17 May 2020
- Monarch: Sallehuddin
- Menteri Besar: Mukhriz Mahathir
- Portfolio: Education and Human Resources
- Preceded by: Herself (Education); Simon Ooi Tze Min (Human Resources)
- Succeeded by: Najmi Ahmad (Education); Wan Romani Wan Salim (Human Resources)
- Constituency: Kota Siputeh
- In office 22 May 2018 – 1 August 2018
- Monarch: Sallehuddin
- Menteri Besar: Mukhriz Mahathir
- Portfolio: Education, Communication, High Technology and Domestic Trade
- Preceded by: Tajul Urus Mat Zain (Education); Norsabrina Mohd Noor (Communication and High Technology); Ku Abdul Rahman Ku Ismail (Domestic Trade)
- Succeeded by: Mohd Firdaus Ahmad (Communication and Multimedia); Portfolio abolished (High Technology); Summugam Rengasamy (Domestic Trade)
- Constituency: Kota Siputeh

Vice Women Chief II of the National Trust Party
- Incumbent
- Assumed office 22 December 2023 Serving with Hafidzah Mustakim (Vice Women Chief I) & Kamaliah Noordin (Vice Women Chief III)
- President: Mohamad Sabu
- Women Chief: Aiman Athirah Sabu

Member of the Kedah State Legislative Assembly for Kota Siputeh
- In office 9 May 2018 – 12 August 2023
- Preceded by: Abu Hassan Sarif (BN–UMNO)
- Succeeded by: Mohd Ashraf Mustaqim Badrul Munir (PN–BERSATU)
- Majority: 1,467 (2018)

Personal details
- Born: Salmee binti Said; 7 June 1966 (age 60) Kampung Padang Besar, Kuala Ketil, Kedah, Malaysia
- Citizenship: Malaysian
- Party: National Trust Party (AMANAH)
- Other political affiliations: Pakatan Harapan (PH)
- Education: University of Malaya (UM) (Bachelor of Dental Surgery)
- Occupation: Politician
- Profession: Dentist

Salmee binti Said is a Malaysian politician who served as Member of the Kedah State Executive Council (EXCO) in the Pakatan Harapan (PH) state administration under former Menteri Besar Mukhriz Mahathir from May 2018 to the collapse of the PH state administration in May 2020 as well as Member of the Kedah State Legislative Assembly (MLA) for Kota Siputeh from May 2018 to August 2023. She is a member of the National Trust Party (AMANAH), a component party of the PH coalition. She has served as the Vice Women Chief II of AMANAH since December 2023.

== Election results ==
Kedah State Legislative Assembly
Year	Constituency	Candidate	Votes	Pct	Opponent(s)	Votes	Pct	Ballots cast	Majority	Turnout%
2018	N03 Kota Siputeh	Salmee Said (AMANAH)	7,265	38.52%	Mat Rejab Md Akhir (PAS)	5,798	30.75%	19,225	1,467	81.70%
2018	N03 Kota Siputeh	Salmee Said (AMANAH)	7,265	38.52%	Ahmad Azhar Abdullah (UMNO)	5,795	30.73%	19,225	1,467	81.70%
2023	N03 Kota Siputeh	Salmee Said (AMANAH)	4,090	18.95%	Mohd Ashraf Mustaqim Badrul Munir (BERSATU)	17,180	79.60%	21,690	13,090	72.84%
2023	N03 Kota Siputeh	Salmee Said (AMANAH)	4,090	18.95%	Abdul Ramli Latif (IND)	312	1.45%	21,690	13,090	72.84%

== Honours ==
- Kedah
  - Companion of the Order of Loyalty to Sultan Sallehuddin of Kedah (SSS) (2019)
