= Mohd Ashraf Mustaqim Badrul Munir =

Malaysian politician

Yang Berhormat Tuan Mohd Ashraf Mustaqim Badrul Munir MLA

Member of the Kedah State Legislative Assembly for Kota Siputeh
- Incumbent
- Assumed office 12 August 2023
- Preceded by: Salmee Said (PH–AMANAH)
- Majority: 13,090 (2023)

Personal details
- Party: Malaysian United Indigenous Party (BERSATU)
- Other political affiliations: Pakatan Harapan (PH) (–2020); Perikatan Nasional (PN) (2020–present)
- Occupation: Politician

Mohd Ashraf Mustaqim bin Badrul Munir is a Malaysian politician who has served as Member of the Kedah State Legislative Assembly (MLA) for Kota Siputeh since August 2023. He is a member of Malaysian United Indigenous Party (BERSATU), a component party of Perikatan Nasional (PN) coalition, formerly PH coalitions.

== Election results ==
Parliament of Malaysia
Year	Constituency	Candidate	Votes	Pct	Opponent(s)	Votes	Pct	Ballots cast	Majority	Turnout
2018	P084 Paya Besar	Mohd Ashraf Mustaqim Badrul Munir (BERSATU)	11,776	26.70%	Mohd Shahar Abdullah (UMNO)	19,033	43.16%	44,942	5,742	81.51%
2018	P084 Paya Besar	Mohd Ashraf Mustaqim Badrul Munir (BERSATU)	11,776	26.70%	Mohamad Azhar Mohd Noor (PAS)	13,291	30.14%	44,942	5,742	81.51%

Kedah State Legislative Assembly
Year	Constituency	Candidate	Votes	Pct	Opponent(s)	Votes	Pct	Ballots cast	Majority	Turnout
2023	N02 Kota Siputeh	Mohd Ashraf Mustaqim Badrul Munir (BERSATU)	17,180	79.60%	Salmee Said (AMANAH)	4,090	18.95%	21,690	13,090	72.84%
2023	N02 Kota Siputeh	Mohd Ashraf Mustaqim Badrul Munir (BERSATU)	17,180	79.60%	Abdul Ramli Latif (IND)	312	1.45%	21,690	13,090	72.84%
