= Lee Guan Aik =

Malaysian politician

Lee Guan Aik AMK JP
- 李源益

Member of the Kedah State Legislative Assembly for Kota Darul Aman
- In office 8 March 2008 – 5 May 2013
- Preceded by: Chong Itt Chew (BN–MCA)
- Succeeded by: Teoh Boon Kok @ Teoh Kai Kok (PR–DAP)
- Majority: 804 (2008)

Personal details
- Born: 1949 (age 76–77)
- Party: Democratic Action Party (DAP)
- Other political affiliations: Pakatan Rakyat (PR) (2008–2015); Pakatan Harapan (PH) (2015–present)

Lee Guan Aik (born 1949) is a Malaysian politician who served as Member of the Kedah State Legislative Assembly (MLA) for Kota Darul Aman from March 2008 to May 2013. He is a member of Democratic Action Party (DAP), a component party of Pakatan Harapan (PH) and Pakatan Rakyat (PR) coalitions.

== Early life ==
Lee Guan Aik was born in 1949.

== Election results ==
Kedah State Legislative Assembly
Year	Constituency	Candidate	Votes	Pct	Opponent(s)	Votes	Pct	Ballot casts	Majority	Turnout
2008	N13 Kota Darul Aman	Lee Guan Aik (DAP)	5,415	54.01%	Chong Itt Chew (MCA)	4,611	45.99%	10,355	804	68.64%

== Honours ==
- Kedah
  - Member of the Order of the Crown of Kedah (AMK) (2009)
  - Justice of the Peace (JP) (2011)
