= Ahmad Fadzli Hashim =

Malaysian politician

Ustaz Ahmad Fadzli Hashim SDK
- أحمد فازلي بن هاشيم

Deputy Speaker of the Kedah State Legislative Assembly
- In office 25 August 2020 – 28 June 2023
- Monarch: Sallehuddin
- Menteri Besar: Muhammad Sanusi Md Nor
- Speaker: Juhari Bulat
- Preceded by: Juhari Bulat
- Succeeded by: Abdul Razak Khamis
- Constituency: Pantai Merdeka

Member of the Kedah State Legislative Assembly for Pantai Merdeka
- In office 9 May 2018 – 12 August 2023
- Preceded by: Ali Yahaya (BN–UMNO)
- Succeeded by: Sharir Long (PN–PAS)
- Majority: 4,566 (2018)

Personal details
- Born: Ahmad Fadzli bin Hashim; 7 June 1974 (age 51) Kedah, Malaysia
- Citizenship: Malaysian
- Party: Malaysian Islamic Party (PAS)
- Other political affiliations: Perikatan Nasional (PN)
- Occupation: Politician
- Profession: Lecturer

Ahmad Fadzli bin Hashim (born 7 June 1974) is a Malaysian politician and lecturer who served as Deputy Speaker of the Kedah State Legislative Assembly from August 2020 to June 2023 and Member of the Legislative Assembly for Pantai Merdeka from May 2018 to August 2023. He is a member of the Malaysian Islamic Party (PAS), a component party of the Perikatan Nasional (PN) coalition.

== Election results ==
Kedah State Legislative Assembly
Year	Constituency	Candidate	Votes	Pct	Opponent(s)	Votes	Pct	Ballots cast	Majority	Turnout
2018	N27 Pantai Merdeka	Ahmad Fadzli Hashim (PAS)	14,133	45.62%	Ali Yahaya (UMNO)	9,567	30.88%	31,523	4,566	85.60%
2018	N27 Pantai Merdeka	Ahmad Fadzli Hashim (PAS)	14,133	45.62%	Rosli Yusof (AMANAH)	7,281	23.50%	31,523	4,566	85.60%

== Honours ==
- Kedah
  - Companion of the Order of Loyalty to the Royal House of Kedah (SDK) (2021)
