= Abu Bakar Taib =

Malaysian politician

Yang Berbahagia Dato' Wira Mahkota Dato' Paduka Abu Bakar Taib DHMS DSDK KMN BCK PJK
- أبو بکر طيب

Ministerial roles
- 1995–2004: Parliamentary Secretary of Agriculture

Faction represented in Dewan Rakyat
- 1995–2013: Barisan Nasional

Personal details
- Born: 21 March 1943 (age 83) Kedah, Japanese occupation of Malaya (now Malaysia)
- Party: United Malays National Organisation (UMNO)
- Other political affiliations: Barisan Nasional (BN); Perikatan Nasional (PN); Muafakat Nasional (MN)
- Occupation: Politician

Abu Bakar bin Taib (born 21 March 1943) is a former Malaysian politician, who represented the seat of Langkawi in the Parliament of Malaysia from 1995 to 2013. He was a member of the governing United Malays National Organisation (UMNO) party and from 1999 to 2004 was a Parliamentary Secretary in the Agriculture Ministry.

Abu Bakar was re-elected to Parliament in the 2008 election, having earlier survived a speculated challenge by Mukhriz Mahathir for the UMNO nomination for his seat. He was dropped from UMNO's list of candidates for the 2013 election, to be replaced by the state assemblyman for Kuah, Nawawi Ahmad.

== Election results ==
Parliament of Malaysia
Year	Constituency	Candidate	Votes	Pct	Opponent(s)	Votes	Pct	Ballots cast	Majority	Turnout
1995	P004 Langkawi	Abu Bakar Taib (UMNO)	11,977	77.13%	Mohd Radzi Sheikh Ahmad (S46)	3,552	22.87%	16,532	8,425	76.12%
1999	P004 Langkawi	Abu Bakar Taib (UMNO)	12,349	68.03%	Amiruddin Hamzah (PAS)	5,802	31.97%	18,566	6,547	80.43%
2004	P004 Langkawi	Abu Bakar Taib (UMNO)	16,510	74.21%	Zubir Ahmad (PAS)	5,738	25.79%	22,844	10,772	81.64%
2008	P004 Langkawi	Abu Bakar Taib (UMNO)	13,762	61.02%	Wan Salleh Wan Isa (PKR)	8,792	38.98%	23,273	4,970	78.71%

== Honours ==
- Malaysia
  - Officer of the Order of the Defender of the Realm (KMN) (1986)
- Kedah
  - Dato' Wira Mahkota (2017)
  - Knight Commander of the Order of Loyalty to Sultan Abdul Halim Mu'adzam Shah (DHMS) – Dato' Paduka (2006)
  - Knight Companion of the Order of Loyalty to the Royal House of Kedah (DSDK) – Dato' (1988)
  - State of Kedah Distinguished Service Star (BCK)
