= Zubir Ahmad =

Malaysian politician

Yang Berhormat Dato' Zubir Ahmad DSSS AMK BKM
- زبير أحمد

15th Speaker of the Kedah State Legislative Assembly
- Incumbent
- Assumed office 25 September 2023
- Monarch: Sallehuddin
- Menteri Besar: Muhammad Sanusi Md Nor
- Deputy: Abdul Razak Khamis
- Preceded by: Juhari Bulat
- Constituency: Non-MLA

Personal details
- Born: Zubir bin Ahmad; 24 February 1963 (age 63) Pulau Lagenda, Langkawi, Kedah, Federation of Malaya
- Party: Malaysian Islamic Party (PAS)
- Other political affiliations: Perikatan Nasional (PN)
- Occupation: Politician

Zubir bin Ahmad is a Malaysian politician who has served as Speaker of the Kedah State Legislative Assembly since September 2023. He is a member and Division Chief of Langkawi of the Malaysian Islamic Party (PAS), a component party of the Perikatan Nasional (PN) coalition.

== Election results ==
Parliament of Malaysia
Year	Constituency	Candidate	Votes	Pct	Opponent(s)	Votes	Pct	Ballots cast	Majority	Turnout
2004	P004 Langkawi	Zubir Ahmad (PAS)	5,738	25.79%	Abu Bakar Taib (UMNO)	16,510	74.21%	22,844	10,772	81.64%
2018	P004 Langkawi	Zubir Ahmad (PAS)	5,512	15.96%	Mahathir Mohamad (BERSATU)	18,954	54.90%	35,250	8,893	80.87%
2018	P004 Langkawi	Zubir Ahmad (PAS)	5,512	15.96%	Nawawi Ahmad (UMNO)	10,061	29.14%	35,250	8,893	80.87%

Kedah State Legislative Assembly
Year	Constituency	Candidate	Votes	Pct	Opponent(s)	Votes	Pct	Ballots cast	Majority	Turnout
2008	N01 Ayer Hangat	Zubir Ahmad (PAS)	5,753	45.51%	Mohd Rawi Abd Hamid (UMNO)	6,888	54.49%	12,951	1,135	80.58%
2013	N01 Ayer Hangat	Zubir Ahmad (PAS)	5,855	34.40%	Mohd Rawi Abd Hamid (UMNO)	11,166	65.60%	17,313	5,311	85.24%

== Honours ==
- Kedah
  - Knight Companion of the Order of Loyalty to Sultan Sallehuddin of Kedah (DSSS) – Dato' (2026)
  - Member of the Order of the Crown of Kedah (AMK) (2023)
  - Recipient of the Public Service Star (BKM) (2009)
