= Mohd Fo'ad Sakdan =

Malaysian academic

Yang Berbahagia Dato' Mohd Fo'ad Sakdan DSDK
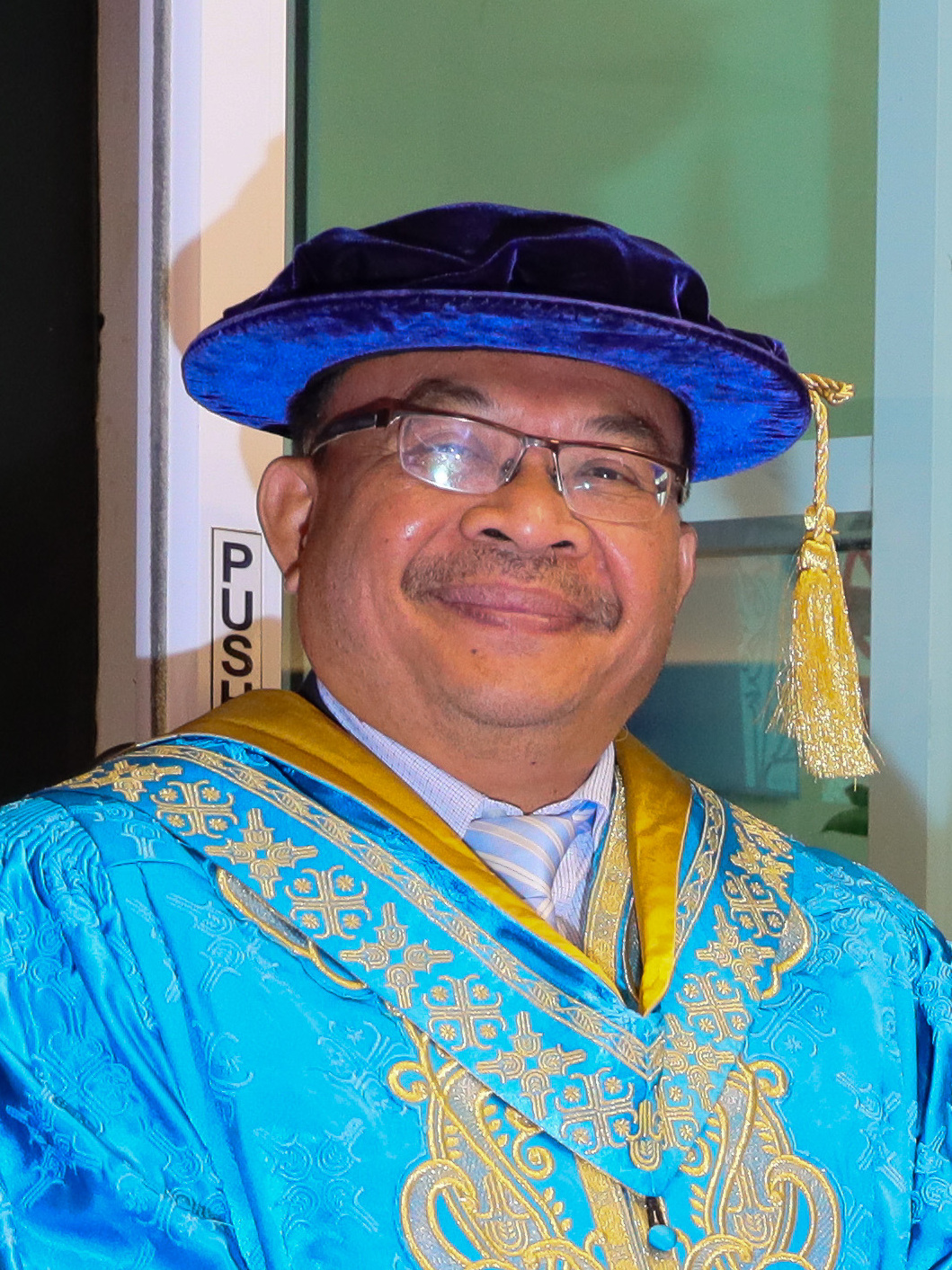
- Mohd Fo'ad in full academic dress, 2023

10th Vice Chancellor of the Universiti Utara Malaysia
- In office 2 April 2023 – 15 December 2025
- Preceded by: Haim Hilman Abdullah
- Succeeded by: Ahmad Martadha Mohamed

Personal details
- Education: National University of Malaysia; University of Hull

Mohd Fo'ad bin Sakdan is a Malaysian academic who has served as the tenth Vice Chancellor of Universiti Utara Malaysia from 2023 until 2025, succeeding Haim Hilman Abdullah.

On November 8, 2024, it was announced that Fo'ad was reappointed to the position as UUM's Vice Chancellor.

== Honours ==
- Kedah :
  - Knight Companion of Order of Loyalty to the Royal House of Kedah (DSDK) – Dato' (2024)
