= Langkawi (federal constituency) =

Federal constituency of Kedah, Malaysia

Langkawi (P004)
Kedah constituency

Federal constituency
- Legislature: Dewan Rakyat
- MP: Mohd Suhaimi Abdullah; PN
- Constituency created: 1994
- First contested: 1995
- Last contested: 2022

Demographics
- Population (2020): 94,138
- Electors (2023): 67,850
- Area (km²): 469
- Pop. density (per km²): 200.7

Langkawi is a federal constituency in Langkawi District, Kedah, Malaysia, that has been represented in the Dewan Rakyat since 1995.

The federal constituency was created in the 1994 redistribution and is mandated to return a single member to the Dewan Rakyat under the first past the post voting system.

== Demographics ==
Ethnic breakdown of Langkawi's electorate as of 2022
1. Malay (90.6%)
2. Chinese (6.80%)
3. Indian (2.30%)
4. Other ethnicities (0.40%)

As of 2020, Langkawi has a population of 94,138 people.

Age breakdown of Langkawi's electorate as of 2022
1. 18-20 (8.00%)
2. 21-29 (25.9%)
3. 30-39 (22.8%)
4. 40-49 (17.6%)
5. 50-59 (13.2%)
6. 60-69 (8.04%)
7. 70-79 (3.28%)
8. 80-89 (1.00%)
9. above 90 (0.18%)
Gender breakdown of Langkawi's electorate as of 2022
1. Male (50.8%)
2. Female (49.2%)

== History ==
=== Polling districts ===
According to the federal gazette issued on 18 July 2023, the Langkawi constituency is divided into 26 polling districts.

State constituency	Polling District	Code	Location
Ayer Hangat (N01)	Kuala Teriang	004/01/01	SK Kuala Teriang
Ayer Hangat (N01)	Ewa	004/01/02	SK Ewa
Ayer Hangat (N01)	Padang Lalang	004/01/03	SK Penghulu Ahmad
Ayer Hangat (N01)	Kilim	004/01/04	SK Kilim
Ayer Hangat (N01)	Ladang Sungai Raya	004/01/05	SK Seri Lagenda
Ayer Hangat (N01)	Wang Tok Rendong	004/01/06	Dewan Homestay Desa Wang Tok Rendong
Ayer Hangat (N01)	Ulu Melaka	004/01/07	SK Ulu Melaka
Ayer Hangat (N01)	Nyior Chabang	004/01/08	SK Nyior Cabang
Ayer Hangat (N01)	Padang Kandang	004/01/09	SMA Al-Baqiyatussolihat
Ayer Hangat (N01)	Padang Matsirat	004/01/10	SK Padang Matsirat
Ayer Hangat (N01)	Kampung Atas	004/01/11	SMK Tunku Putra
Ayer Hangat (N01)	Bukit Kemboja	004/01/12	Maktab Mahmud Langkawi Pintu A
Ayer Hangat (N01)	Makam Mahsuri	004/01/13	Maktab Mahmud Langkawi Pintu B
Kuah (N02)	Bendang Baru	004/02/01	SK Seri Negeri
Kuah (N02)	Kampung Gelam	004/02/02	SMK Kedawang
Kuah (N02)	Kedawang	004/02/03	SK Kedawang
Kuah (N02)	Pantai Chenang	004/02/04	Langkawi Tourism Academy @ Kolej Komuniti Langkawi, Jalan Pantai Chenang
Kuah (N02)	Temonyong	004/02/05	SK Temonyong
Kuah (N02)	Kampung Bayas	004/02/06	SK Bayas
Kuah (N02)	Sungai Menghulu	004/02/07	Kolej Vokasional Pulau Langkawi
Kuah (N02)	Kelibang	004/02/08	SK Kelibang
Kuah (N02)	Dundong	004/02/09	SMK Mahsuri
Kuah (N02)	Pulau Dayang Bunting	004/02/10	SK Selat Bagan Nyior
Kuah (N02)	Lubok Chempedak	004/02/11	SMK Langkawi
Kuah (N02)	Kampung Tuba	004/02/12	SK Pulau Tuba
Kuah (N02)	Kuah	004/02/13	SK Langkawi
Kuah (N02)	Kampung Bukit Malut	004/02/14	SK Bayas

=== Representation history ===
Members of Parliament for Langkawi
Parliament	No	Years	Member	Party	Vote Share
Constituency created from Jerlun-Langkawi
9th	P004	1995–1999	Abu Bakar Taib (ابو بكر طائب)	BN (UMNO)	11,977; 77.13%
10th	P004	1999–2004	Abu Bakar Taib (ابو بكر طائب)	BN (UMNO)	12,349; 68.03%
11th	P004	2004–2008	Abu Bakar Taib (ابو بكر طائب)	BN (UMNO)	16,510; 74.21%
12th	P004	2008–2013	Abu Bakar Taib (ابو بكر طائب)	BN (UMNO)	13,762; 61.02%
13th	P004	2013–2018	Nawawi Ahmad (نووي احمد)	BN (UMNO)	21,407; 68.76%
14th	P004	2018–2020	Mahathir Mohamad (محضير محمد)	PH (BERSATU)	18,954; 54.90%
14th	P004	2020	Mahathir Mohamad (محضير محمد)	BERSATU	18,954; 54.90%
14th	P004	2020	Mahathir Mohamad (محضير محمد)	Independent	18,954; 54.90%
14th	P004	2020–2022	Mahathir Mohamad (محضير محمد)	PEJUANG	18,954; 54.90%
15th	P004	2022–present	Mohd Suhaimi Abdullah (محمد سوهايمي عبدالله)	PN (BERSATU)	25,463; 53.63%

=== State constituency ===
Parliamentary constituency	State constituency						
Parliamentary constituency	1955–1959*	1959–1974	1974–1986	1986–1995	1995–2004	2004–2018	2018–present
Langkawi						Ayer Hangat	
Langkawi					Kuah		
Langkawi					Padang Matsirat		

=== Historical boundaries ===
State Constituency	Area		
State Constituency	1994	2004	2018
Ayer Hangat		Ayer Hangat; Kampung Belanga Pecah; Kampung Kilim; Kampung Padang Gaong; Padang Matsirat	Ayer Hangat; Kampung Belanga Pecah; Kampung Padang Gaong; Padang Matsirat; Pulau Timun
Kuah	Ayer Hangat; Kampung Bendang Baru; Kampung Sungai Menghulu; Pulau Dayang Bunting; Pulau Timun	Kampung Bendang Baru; Kedawang; Kuah; Pulau Dayang Bunting; Pulau Timun	Kampung Bendang Baru; Kampung Kuala Temoyong; Kedawang; Kuah; Pulau Dayang Bunting
Padang Matsirat	Kuala Kuala Temoyong; Kampung Padang Gaong; Kedawang; Mata Ayer; Padang Matsirat		

=== Current state assembly members ===
No.	State Constituency	Member	Coalition (Party)
N01	Ayer Hangat	Shamsilah Siru	PN (BERSATU)
N02	Kuah	Amar Pared Mahamud	PN (BERSATU)

=== Local governments & postcodes ===
No.	State Constituency	Local Government	Postcode
N01	Ayer Hangat	Langkawi Municipal Council	07000 Langkawi
N02	Kuah	Langkawi Municipal Council	07000 Langkawi

== Election results ==
Malaysian general election, 2022
Party	Candidate	Votes	%	∆%
PN	Mohd Suhaimi Abdullah	25,463	53.63	▲53.63
BN	Armishah Siradj	11,945	25.16	▼3.92
PH	Zabidi Yahya	5,417	11.41	▲11.41
PEJUANG	Mahathir Mohamad	4,566	9.62	▲9.62
Independent	Abd Kadir Sainudin	89	0.19	▲0.19
Total valid votes		47,480	100.00	
Total rejected ballots		508		
Unreturned ballots		135		
Turnout		48,123	71.10	▼11.46
Registered electors		66,777		
Majority		13,518	28.47	▲2.71
PN gain from PKR		Swing		?
Source(s) https://lom.agc.gov.my/ilims/upload/portal/akta/outputp/1753260/PUB%20606%20(2022).pdf

Malaysian general election, 2018
Party	Candidate	Votes	%	∆%
PKR	Mahathir Mohamad	18,954	54.90	▲24.23
BN	Nawawi Ahmad	10,061	29.14	▼39.62
PAS	Zubir Ahmad	5,512	15.96	▲15.96
Total valid votes		34,527	100.00	
Total rejected ballots		604		
Unreturned ballots		119		
Turnout		35,250	82.56	▼2.95
Registered electors		42,697		
Majority		8,893	25.76	▼12.34
PKR gain from BN		Swing		?
Source(s) "His Majesty's Government Gazette - Notice of Contested Election, Parliament for the State of Kedah [P.U. (B) 233/2018]" (PDF). Attorney General's Chambers of Malaysia. 3 May 2018. "Federal Government Gazette - Results of Contested Election and Statements of the Poll after the Official Addition of Votes, Parliamentary Constituencies for the State of Kedah [P.U. (B) 307/2018]" (PDF). Attorney General's Chambers of Malaysia. 28 May 2018. "Damansara parliamentary seat records biggest majority - Nation". The Star Online. 10 May 2018.

Malaysian general election, 2013
Party	Candidate	Votes	%	∆%
BN	Nawawi Ahmad	21,407	68.76	▲7.74
PKR	Ahmad Abdullah	9,546	30.66	▼8.32
Independent	Marina Hussein	180	0.58	▲0.58
Total valid votes		31,133	100.00	
Total rejected ballots		744		
Unreturned ballots		219		
Turnout		32,096	85.51	▲6.80
Registered electors		37,536		
Majority		11,861	38.10	▲16.06
BN hold		Swing		
Source(s) "Federal Government Gazette - Notice of Contested Election, Parliament for the State of Kedah [P.U. (B) 170/2013]" (PDF). Attorney General's Chambers of Malaysia. 26 April 2013. Archived from the original (PDF) on 29 December 2019. "Federal Government Gazette - Results of Contested Election and Statements of the Poll after the Official Addition of Votes, Parliamentary Constituencies for the State of Kedah [P.U. (B) 211/2013]" (PDF). Attorney General's Chambers of Malaysia. 22 May 2013.

Malaysian general election, 2008
Party	Candidate	Votes	%	∆%
BN	Abu Bakar Taib	13,762	61.02	▼13.21
PKR	Wan Salleh Wan Isa	8,792	38.98	▲38.98
Total valid votes		22,554	100.00	
Total rejected ballots		670		
Unreturned ballots		49		
Turnout		23,273	78.71	▼2.93
Registered electors		29,567		
Majority		4,970	22.04	▼26.38
BN hold		Swing		

Malaysian general election, 2004
Party	Candidate	Votes	%	∆%
BN	Abu Bakar Taib	16,510	74.21	▲6.18
PAS	Zubir Ahmad	5,738	25.79	▼6.18
Total valid votes		22,248	100.00	
Total rejected ballots		560		
Unreturned ballots		36		
Turnout		22,844	81.64	▲1.21
Registered electors		27,981		
Majority		10,772	48.42	▲12.36
BN hold		Swing		

Malaysian general election, 1999
Party	Candidate	Votes	%	∆%
BN	Abu Bakar Taib	12,349	68.03	▼9.10
PAS	Amiruddin Hamzah	5,802	31.97	▲31.97
Total valid votes		18,151	100.00	
Total rejected ballots		351		
Unreturned ballots		64		
Turnout		18,566	80.43	▲4.31
Registered electors		23,083		
Majority		6,547	36.06	▼18.20
BN hold		Swing		

Malaysian general election, 1995
Party	Candidate	Votes	%
BN	Abu Bakar Taib	11,977	77.13
S46	Radzi Ahmad	3,552	22.87
Total valid votes		15,529	100.00
Total rejected ballots		959	
Unreturned ballots		44	
Turnout		16,532	76.12
Registered electors		21,718	
Majority		8,425	54.26
This was a new constituency created.
