= Haim Hilman Abdullah =

Malaysian politician

Yang Berhormat Dr. Haim Hilman Abdullah AMK MLA
- هائم حلمان عبدالله
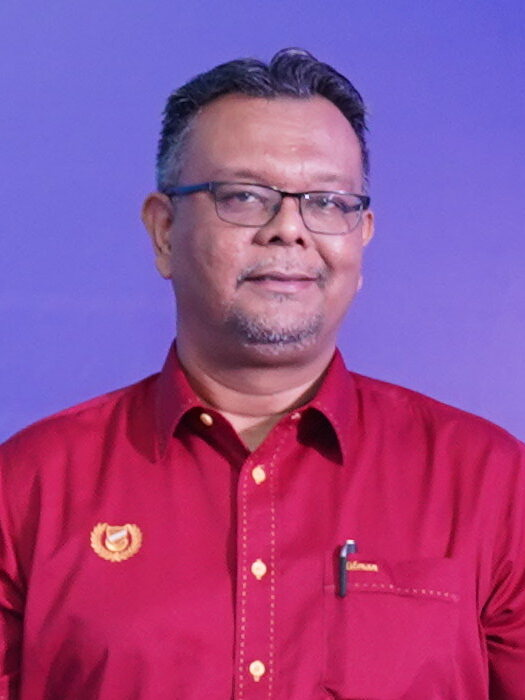
- Haim Hilman in 2024

Member of the Kedah State Executive Council
- Incumbent
- Assumed office 21 August 2023
- Monarch: Sallehuddin
- Menteri Besar: Muhammad Sanusi Md Nor
- Portfolio: Industry and Investment, Higher Education, Science, Technology and Innovation
- Preceded by: Ku Abdul Rahman Ku Ismail (Industries and Investment, Science and Technology and Innovation, Higher Education)
- Constituency: Jitra

Member of the Kedah State Legislative Assembly for Jitra
- Incumbent
- Assumed office 12 August 2023
- Preceded by: Mukhriz Mahathir (PH–BERSATU)
- Majority: 23,172 (2033)

9th Vice Chancellor of the Universiti Utara Malaysia
- In office 17 January 2022 – 18 January 2023
- Preceded by: Ahmad Bashawir Abdul Ghani
- Succeeded by: Mohd Fo'ad Sakdan

Personal details
- Born: 4 February 1973 (age 53) Tanjung Malim, Perak
- Party: Malaysian Islamic Party (PAS) (2023–present)
- Other political affiliations: Perikatan Nasional (PN) (2023–present)
- Education: Universiti Putra Malaysia (2005–2009); University of Portsmouth (1998–1999); UiTM (1991–1996)

Haim Hilman bin Abdullah (born 4 February 1973) is a Malaysian politician and academic. He served as Member of the Kedah State Executive Council (EXCO) in the Perikatan Nasional (PN) state administration under Menteri Besar Muhammad Sanusi Md Nor and Member of the Kedah State Legislative Assembly (MLA) for Jitra since August 2023. He was appointed as the Vice Chancellor of Universiti Utara Malaysia (UUM) in January 2022 to January 2023. He is a member of Malaysian Islamic Party (PAS), a component party of Perikatan Nasional (PN) coalitions.

== Education ==
Haim Hilman received his early education at Selisek National Primary School, Hulu Selangor and Khir Johari Secondary School, Tanjung Malim before continuing his studies at the UiTM diploma level and then to Portsmouth University in the United Kingdom in 1996.

He has obtained a bachelor's degree and a master's degree in Business Administration from the University of Portsmouth, United Kingdom. He also obtained a doctorate in Strategic Management in 2010 from Universiti Putra Malaysia.

== Issue ==
=== Service period shortened ===
Haim Hilman has been appointed as Vice Chancellor of the Universiti Utara Malaysia with effect from 17 January 2022. His appointment was made to replace Ahmad Bashawir Abdul Ghani who has served for three years. In December 2022, the Ministry of Higher Education announced that his tenure would be shortened. Minister of Higher Education Mohamed Khaled Nordin explained the shortening of Haim Hilman's service period due to complaints involving him.

== Election results ==
Kedah State Legislative Assembly
Year	Constituency	Candidate	Votes	Pct	Opponent(s)	Votes	Pct	Ballots cast	Majority	Turnout
2023	N06 Jitra	Haim Hilman Abdullah (PAS)	34,342	75.46%	Sabrina Ahmad (PKR)	11,170	24.54%	45,792	23,172	72.62%

== Honours ==
- Kedah
  - Member of the Order of the Crown of Kedah (AMK) (2015)

== See also ==
- The Greater Kedah 2050
