= Bukit Pinang (state constituency) =

Political subdivision in Malaysia

Bukit Pinang (N10)
Kedah constituency

State constituency
- Legislature: Kedah State Legislative Assembly
MLA
Wan Romani Wan Salim
PN
- Constituency created: 2003
- First contested: 2004
- Last contested: 2023

Demographics
- Electors (2023): 36,791

Bukit Pinang is a state constituency in Kedah, Malaysia, that is represented in the Kedah State Legislative Assembly.

== Demographics ==
As of 2020, Bukit Pinang has a population of 41,388 people.

Ethnic breakdown of Bukit Pinang's electorate as of 2023
1. Malay (93.1%)
2. Chinese (5.33%)
3. Indian (0.94%)
4. Other ethnicities (0.61%)

== History ==
=== Polling districts ===
According to the gazette issued on 30 March 2018, the Bukit Pinang constituency has a total of 16 polling districts.

State constituency	Polling districts	Code	Location
Bukit Pinang (N10）	Paya Lengkuas	008/10/01	SK Lengkuas
Bukit Pinang (N10）	Bukit Pinang	008/10/02	SJK (C) Soon Cheng
Bukit Pinang (N10）	Titi Baru	008/10/03	SMK Kepala Batas
Bukit Pinang (N10）	Kubang Lintah	008/10/04	SK Haji Abu Bakar
Bukit Pinang (N10）	Hutan Kampung	008/10/05	SMK Hutan Kampung
Bukit Pinang (N10）	Taman Bayu	008/10/06	SMK Dato' Syed Omar
Bukit Pinang (N10）	Kampung Bohor	008/10/07	SK Bohor
Bukit Pinang (N10）	Lepai	008/10/08	SK Haji Abu Bakar
Bukit Pinang (N10）	Kampung Sungai Mati	008/10/09	Maktab Mahmud Pokok Sena
Bukit Pinang (N10）	Limbong	008/10/10	SK Taman Awana
Bukit Pinang (N10）	Kampung Alor Setol	008/10/11	SJK (C) Tai Chong
Bukit Pinang (N10）	Pondok Langgar	008/10/12	SK Langgar
Bukit Pinang (N10）	Kampung Langgar B	008/10/13	SMK Langgar
Bukit Pinang (N10）	Telok Jamat	008/10/14	SK Teluk Jamat
Bukit Pinang (N10）	Alor Senibong	008/10/15	Pertubuhan Peladang Kawasan Gerak Maju B-III Km 14
Bukit Pinang (N10）	Tualang	008/10/16	SK Tualang

=== Representation history ===
Kedah State Legislative Assemblyman for Bukit Pinang
Assembly	No	Years	Member	Party
Constituency created from Langgar and Bukit Lada
11th	N10	2004–2008	Md Roshidi Osman	PAS
12th	N10	2008–2013	Md Roshidi Osman	PR (PAS)
13th	N10	2013–2018	Wan Romani Wan Salim	PR (PAS)
14th	N10	2018–2020	Wan Romani Wan Salim	PAS
14th	N10	2020–2023	Wan Romani Wan Salim	PN (PAS)
15th	N10	2023–present	Wan Romani Wan Salim	PN (PAS)

== Election results ==
Kedah state election, 2023
Party	Candidate	Votes	%	∆%
PN	Wan Romani Wan Salim	23,041	82.82	▲82.82
PH	Hazir Mat Zain	4,780	17.18	▼12.98
Total valid votes		27,821	100.00	
Total rejected ballots		156		
Unreturned ballots		53		
Turnout		28,030	76.19	▼7.61
Registered electors		36,791		
Majority		18,261	65.64	▲52.23
PN hold		Swing		

Kedah state election, 2018
Party	Candidate	Votes	%	∆%
PAS	Wan Romani Wan Salim	10,432	43.57	▼10.12
PKR	Che Mat Dzaher Ahmad	7,220	30.16	▲30.16
BN	Mohammad Nawar Ariffin	6,289	26.27	▼20.04
Total valid votes		23,941	100.00	
Total rejected ballots		300		
Unreturned ballots		96		
Turnout		24,337	83.80	▼3.10
Registered electors		29,041		
Majority		3,212	13.41	▲6.03
PAS hold		Swing		

Kedah state election, 2013
Party	Candidate	Votes	%	∆%
PAS	Wan Romani Wan Salim	12,152	53.69	▼4.99
BN	Che Mat Dzaher Ahmad	10,480	46.31	▲4.99
Total valid votes		22,632	100.00	
Total rejected ballots		258		
Unreturned ballots		71		
Turnout		22,961	86.90	▲3.84
Registered electors		26,426		
Majority		1,672	7.38	▼10.14
PAS hold		Swing		

Kedah state election, 2008
Party	Candidate	Votes	%	∆%
PAS	Md Roshidi Osman	11,307	58.68	▲6.24
BN	Che Omar Saad	7,908	41.16	▼6.24
Total valid votes		19,215	100.00	
Total rejected ballots		372		
Unreturned ballots		514		
Turnout		20,101	83.06	▲1.36
Registered electors		24,202		
Majority		3,399	17.52	▲12.40
PAS hold		Swing		

Kedah state election, 2004
Party	Candidate	Votes	%
PAS	Md Roshidi Osman	9,636	52.56
BN	Ahmad Sudin	8,699	47.44
Total valid votes		18,335	100.00
Total rejected ballots		144	
Unreturned ballots		0	
Turnout		18,479	81.70
Registered electors		22,617	
Majority		937	5.12
This was a new constituency created.
