= Teh Swee Leong =

Malaysian politician

Yang Berhormat Tuan Teh Swee Leong MLA
- 郑瑞隆

Member of the Kedah State Legislative Assembly for Kota Darul Aman
- Incumbent
- Assumed office 9 May 2018
- Preceded by: Teoh Boon Kok (PR–DAP)
- Majority: 8,468 (2018); 5,650 (2023)

Personal details
- Born: Teh Swee Leong; 13 May 1989 (age 36) Malaysia
- Party: Democratic Action Party (DAP)
- Other political affiliations: Pakatan Harapan (PH)
- Occupation: Politician

Teh Swee Leong (born 13 May 1989) is a Malaysian politician who has served as Member of the Kedah State Legislative Assembly (MLA) for Kota Darul Aman since May 2018. He is a member and State Secretary of Kedah of the Democratic Action Party (DAP), a component party of the Pakatan Harapan (PH) coalition. He is also the sole Kedah DAP MLA after Tan Kok Yew lost his reelection as the Derga MLA in the 2023 Kedah state election.

== Election results ==
Kedah State Legislative Assembly
Year	Constituency	Candidate	Votes	Pct	Opponent(s)	Votes	Pct	Ballots cast	Majority	Turnout
2018	N13 Kota Darul Aman	Teh Swee Leong (DAP)	11,737	69.99%	Tan Eng Hwa (MCA)	3,269	19.49%	17,046	8,468	78.10%
2018	N13 Kota Darul Aman	Teh Swee Leong (DAP)	11,737	69.99%	Zulkifli Che Haron (PAS)	1,732	10.33%	17,046	8,468	78.10%
2018	N13 Kota Darul Aman	Teh Swee Leong (DAP)	11,737	69.99%	Tan Kang Yap (PRM)	32	0.19%	17,046	8,468	78.10%
2023	N13 Kota Darul Aman	Teh Swee Leong (DAP)	11,178	66.91%	Chuah See Seng (GERAKAN)	5,528	33.09%	16,797	5,650	64.68%
