= Mansor Zakaria =

Malaysian politician

Yang Berhormat Major (Rtd) Mansor Zakaria SSS AMK PPA PNBB MLA
- منصور زكريا

Member of the Kedah State Executive Council
- Incumbent
- Assumed office 21 August 2023 (Housing, Local Government and Health)
- Monarch: Sallehuddin
- Menteri Besar: Muhammad Sanusi Md Nor
- Preceded by: Robert Ling Kui Ee (Housing); Mohd Hayati Othman (Health, Local Government)
- Constituency: Kuala Ketil

Member of the Kedah State Legislative Assembly for Kuala Ketil
- Incumbent
- Assumed office 9 May 2018
- Preceded by: Md Zuki Yusof (PR–PAS)
- Majority: 1,581 (2018); 16,565 (2023)

Personal details
- Party: Malaysian Islamic Party (PAS)
- Occupation: Politician

Mansor bin Zakaria is a Malaysian politician. He served as Member of the Kedah State Executive Council (EXCO) in the Perikatan Nasional (PN) state administration under Menteri Besar Muhammad Sanusi Md Nor and Member of the Kedah State Legislative Assembly (MLA) for Kuala Ketil since May 2018. He is a member of Malaysian Islamic Party (PAS), a component party of Perikatan Nasional (PN).

== Election results ==
Kedah State Legislative Assembly
Year	Constituency	Candidate	Votes	Pct	Opponent(s)	Votes	Pct	Ballots cast	Majority	Turnout
2018	N32 Kuala Ketil	Mansor Zakaria (PAS)	12,574	44.09%	Mohd Khairul Azhar Abdullah (UMNO)	10,993	38.55%	29,038	1,581	85.92%
2018	N32 Kuala Ketil	Mansor Zakaria (PAS)	12,574	44.09%	Mohamad Sofee Razak (PKR)	4,952	17.36%	29,038	1,581	85.92%
2023	N32 Kuala Ketil	Mansor Zakaria (PAS)	24,872	74.96%	Suriati Che Mid (UMNO)	8,307	25.04%	33,380	16,565	79.13%

== Honours ==
=== Honours of Malaysia ===
- Malaysia
  - Recipient of the General Service Medal (PPA)
  - Recipient of the United Nations Missions Service Medal (PNBB) with "BOSNIA" clasp
  - Recipient of the 11th Yang di-Pertuan Agong Installation Medal
  - Recipient of the 12th Yang di-Pertuan Agong Installation Medal
- Kedah
  - Companion of the Order of Loyalty to Sultan Sallehuddin of Kedah (SSS) (2026)
  - Member of the Order of the Crown of Kedah (AMK)
  - Recipient of the Sultan Abdul Halim Golden Jubilee Medal
  - Recipient of the Sultan Sallehuddin Installation Medal

=== Foreign honours ===
- NATO
  - Recipient of the SFOR Medal
