= Sharir Long =

Malaysian politician

Yang Berhormat Ustaz Sharir Long MLA
- شارير لوڠ
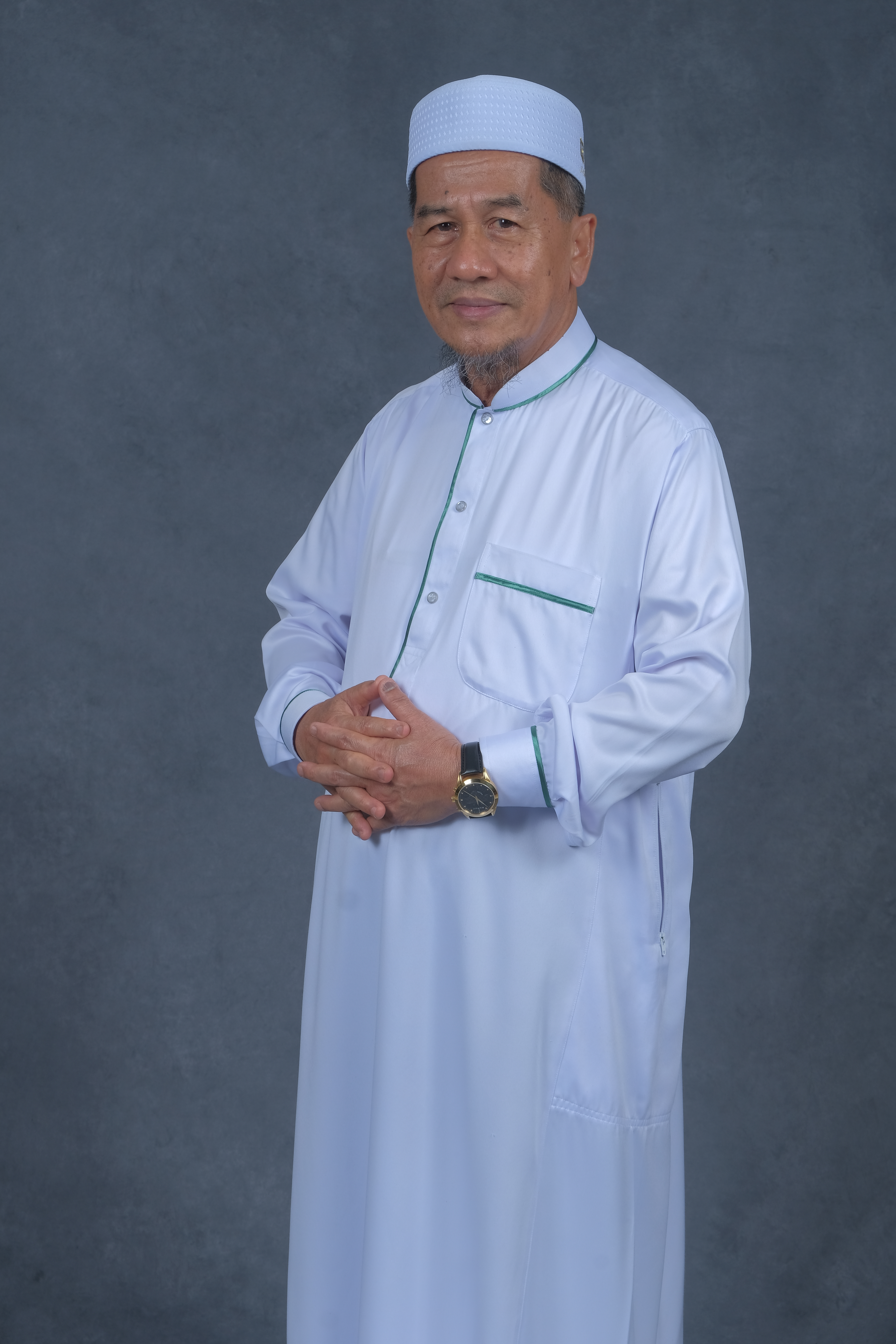

Member of the Kedah State Legislative Assembly for Pantai Merdeka
- Incumbent
- Assumed office 12 August 2023
- Preceded by: Ahmad Fadzli Hashim (PAS)
- Majority: 23,691 (2023)

Personal details
- Party: Malaysian Islamic Party (PAS)
- Other political affiliations: Perikatan Nasional (PN)
- Occupation: Politician

Sharir bin Long is a Malaysian politician who served as Member of the Kedah State Legislative Assembly (MLA) for Pantai Merdeka since August 2023. He is a member of Malaysian Islamic Party (PAS), a component party of Perikatan Nasional (PN) coalitions.

== Election results ==
Parliament of Malaysia
Year	Constituency	Candidate	Votes	Pct	Opponent(s)	Votes	Pct	Ballots cast	Majority	Turnout
2018	P015 Sungai Petani	Sharir Long (PAS)	22,760	24.60%	Johari Abdul (PKR)	45,532	49.21%	93,847	21,569	83.36%
2018	P015 Sungai Petani	Sharir Long (PAS)	22,760	24.60%	Shahanim Mohamad Yusoff (UMNO)	23,963	25.90%	93,847	21,569	83.36%
2018	P015 Sungai Petani	Sharir Long (PAS)	22,760	24.60%	Sritharan Pichathu (PRM)	279	0.30%	93,847	21,569	83.36%

Kedah State Legislative Assembly
Year	Constituency	Candidate	Votes	Pct	Opponent(s)	Votes	Pct	Ballots cast	Majority	Turnout
2023	N27 Pantai Merdeka	Sharir Long (PAS)	32,225	79.06%	Wan Mohalina Wan Mohamad (UMNO)	8,534	20.94%	40,994	23,691	79.60%
