= Sultan Abdul Halim Hospital =

Hospital in Kuala Muda, Kedah, Malaysia

- Ministry of Health (Malaysia)

Geography
- Location: Sungai Petani, Kedah, Malaysia

Organisation
- Type: District General
- Affiliated university: AIMST University

Services
- Standards: National standards
- Emergency department: Yes
- Beds: 498

History
- Opened: 23 July 2006

Links
- Website: jknkedah.moh.gov.my/hsah/
- Lists: Hospitals in Malaysia

Sultan Abdul Halim Hospital (HSAH), formerly known as Hospital Sungai Petani, is a government-funded rural general hospital situated in Sungai Petani, Kedah, Malaysia. It is a 498-bed hospital which provides secondary and tertiary specialist services.

The hospital, costing US$150 million, is one of the most high-tech hospitals in northern Peninsular Malaysia with Total Hospital Information System. The Sultan Abdul Halim Hospital was handed over by the Public Works Department to the Health Ministry on 23 July 2006.

The hospital provides laparoscopic gynaecology operations. It is a recognised training center for gynaecologists in this field. It is also a center for thoracic surgery for the northern part of Peninsular Malaysia. This hospital is a training hospital for Sungai Petani Nursing College and AIMST University.

The hospital is named after Kedah's former Sultan, Sultan Abdul Halim.

== History ==
The hospital's history dates back to 1920 when the Medical Officer Central Kedah was set up. It was headed by Dr. Richard Brunel Hawes from England. At that time, the hospital was surrounded by rubber estates and jungles with wild animals.

During the Japanese Occupation in 1942, the psychiatric wing was moved to the Bedong Group Estate because the building was used as a Japanese army camp. After the British returned at the end of World War II, the psychiatric wing was shifted back to its original home.

The hospital was then renamed the Sungai Petani District Hospital. It was situated in a land with the size of 36 acres (150,000 m^{2}) next to Sungai Petani prison and had 396 beds. At first the hospital did not have any specialists. Specialist services were only started in 1974 with obstetrics and gynaecology as well as internal medicine.

Due to the rapid growth of Kuala Muda district, the need for a new hospital that would keep up with the growing needs of the community became evident. Construction was started on a new 550-bed hospital which would be one of the most up-to-date in Northern Peninsular Malaysia in Amanjaya. The cost of construction was US$150 million. The hospital was handed over by the Public Works Department to the Health Ministry on 23 July 2006. After the completion of new hospital complex, the old Hospital Sungai Petani was repurpose as Sungai Petani Health Clinic which consist Kuala Muda District Health Office.

== Specialisations ==
SAHH currently offers specialist services in 11 fields, as follows:

- Internal medicine
- Thoracic surgery
- Obstetrics and gynaecology
- Orthopaedics
- Anaesthesiology
- Ophthalmology
- Otorhinolaryngology (ENT)
- Radiology
- Pathology
- Paediatrics
- Psychiatry and mental health

== Teaching Hospital ==
Sultan Abdul Halim Hospital serves as a teaching hospital for medical students from AIMST University. It is a recognised training center for gynaecologists in the field of laparoscopic gynaecology operations.
