= Kuala Ketil (state constituency) =

State constituency in Kedah, Malaysia

Kuala Ketil (N32)
Kedah constituency

State constituency
- Legislature: Kedah State Legislative Assembly
MLA
Mansor Zakaria
PN
- Constituency created: 1974
- Constituency abolished: 1984
- Constituency re-created: 1995
- First contested: 1974
- Last contested: 2023

Demographics
- Electors (2023): 42,184

Kuala Ketil is a state constituency in Kedah, Malaysia, that has been represented in the Kedah State Legislative Assembly.

== Demographics ==
As of 2020, Kuala Ketil has a population of 51,301 people.

Ethnic breakdown of Kuala Ketil's electorate as of 2023
1. Malay (82.4%)
2. Indian (11.1%)
3. Chinese (5.68%)
4. Other ethnicities (0.88%)

== History ==
=== Polling districts ===
According to the gazette issued on 30 March 2018, the Kuala Ketil constituency has a total of 24 polling districts.

State constituency	Polling districts	Code	Location
Kuala Ketil（N32）	FELDA Teloi Kanan	016/32/01	SK Teloi Kanan
Kuala Ketil（N32）	Kampung Guar Chempedak	016/32/02	SK Mohd Ariff Abdullah
Kuala Ketil（N32）	Padang Kulim	016/32/03	SK Kuala Ketil
Kuala Ketil（N32）	Pekan Baru Kuala Ketil	016/32/04	SMK Kuala Ketil
Kuala Ketil（N32）	Pekan Lama Kuala Ketil	016/32/05	SMK Tanjung Puteri
Kuala Ketil（N32）	Taman Batu Pekaka	016/32/06	SJK (C) Kuala Ketil
Kuala Ketil（N32）	Batu Pekaka	016/32/07	SK Batu Pekaka
Kuala Ketil（N32）	Kampung Thye Seng	016/32/08	SJK (T) Ladang Batu Pekaka
Kuala Ketil（N32）	Kuala Kuli	016/32/09	SK Seri Jemerli
Kuala Ketil（N32）	Kampung Jawa	016/32/10	SK Kuala Ketil
Kuala Ketil（N32）	Padang Geh	016/32/11	SJK (T) Ladang Kim Seng
Kuala Ketil（N32）	Kuala Merah	016/32/12	SK Kuala Merah
Kuala Ketil（N32）	Parit Panjang	016/32/13	SMK Parit Panjang
Kuala Ketil（N32）	Kampung Tembak	016/32/14	SK Tembak
Kuala Ketil（N32）	Paya Besar	016/32/15	SK Paya Besar
Kuala Ketil（N32）	Kuala Samak	016/32/16	SK Kuala Semak
Kuala Ketil（N32）	Binjol Dalam	016/32/17	SK Binjul Dalam
Kuala Ketil（N32）	Kampung Tawar	016/32/18	SK Tawar
Kuala Ketil（N32）	Pekan Tawar	016/32/19	SJK (C) Kong Min
Kuala Ketil（N32）	Binjal Luar	016/32/20	SK Binjul
Kuala Ketil（N32）	Ladang Malakoff	016/32/21	SJK (T) Ladang Malakoff
Kuala Ketil（N32）	Kejal	016/32/22	SK Kampung Selarong
Kuala Ketil（N32）	Kampung Bakai	016/32/23	SK Seri Inas
Kuala Ketil（N32）	Pelam	016/32/24	SJK (T) Ladang Pelam

=== Representation history ===
Members of the Legislative Assembly for Kuala Ketil
Assembly	No	Years	Name	Party
Constituency created from Sungei Patani Luar, Sidam, Baling Barat and Pekan Sungei Patani
4th	N22	1974–1978	Mohamed Muslim Othman	BN (UMNO)
5th	N22	1978–1982	Supramaniam Ahnasamy Pillai	BN (MIC)
6th	N22	1982–1986	S. Subramaniam	BN (MIC)
Constituency split into Merbau Pulas, Tikam Batu and Bukit Selambau
Constituency recreated from Bukit Selambau and Merbau Pulas
9th	N32	1995–1999	Mohd Hadzir Ismail	BN (UMNO)
10th	N32	1999–2004	Mohd Hadzir Ismail	BN (UMNO)
11th	N32	2004–2008	Abdul Aziz Sheikh Fadzir	BN (UMNO)
12th	N32	2008–2013	Md Zuki Yusof	PR (PAS)
13th	N32	2013–2018	Md Zuki Yusof	PR (PAS)
14th	N32	2018–2020	Mansor Zakaria	PAS
14th	N32	2020–2023	Mansor Zakaria	PN (PAS)
15th	N32	2023–present	Mansor Zakaria	PN (PAS)

== Election results ==
Kedah state election, 2023
Party	Candidate	Votes	%	∆%
PN	Mansor Zakaria	24,872	74.96	▲74.96
BN	Suriati Che Mid	8,307	25.04	▼13.51
Total valid votes		33,179	100.00	
Total rejected ballots		165		
Unreturned ballots		36		
Turnout		33,380	79.13	▼6.79
Registered electors		42,184		
Majority		16,565	49.92	▲44.38
PN hold		Swing		

Kedah state election, 2018
Party	Candidate	Votes	%	∆%
PAS	Mansor Zakaria	12,574	44.09	▼19.16
BN	Mohd Khairul Azhar Abdullah	10,993	38.55	▼9.12
PKR	Mohamad Sofee Razak	4,952	17.36	▲17.36
Total valid votes		33,798	100.00	
Total rejected ballots		444		
Unreturned ballots		73		
Turnout		29,038	85.92	▼2.79
Registered electors		42,184		
Majority		1,581	5.54	▼8.05
PAS hold		Swing		

Kedah state election, 2013
Party	Candidate	Votes	%	∆%
PAS	Md Zuki Yusof	12,769	52.14	▼10.48
BN	Mohd Khairul Azhar Abdullah	11,615	38.55	▲9.23
KITA	Krishnan Ganapathy	105	0.04	▲0.04
Total valid votes		24,489	100.00	
Total rejected ballots		369		
Unreturned ballots		59		
Turnout		24,917	88.71	▲6.16
Registered electors		28,087		
Majority		1,154	13.59	▼11.65
PAS hold		Swing		

Kedah state election, 2008
Party	Candidate	Votes	%	∆%
PAS	Md Zuki Yusof	12,105	62.62	▲13.89
BN	Firdaus Zakaria	7,225	37.38	▼13.89
Total valid votes		19,330	100.00	
Total rejected ballots		338		
Unreturned ballots		29		
Turnout		19,697	82.55	▲0.29
Registered electors		23,861		
Majority		4,880	25.25	▲22.71
PAS gain from BN		Swing		-

Kedah state election, 2004
Party	Candidate	Votes	%	∆%
BN	Abdul Aziz Sheikh Fadzir	9,323	51.27	▼8.90
PAS	Md. Zuki Yusof	8,861	48.73	▲8.90
Total valid votes		18,184	100.00	
Total rejected ballots		289		
Unreturned ballots		0		
Turnout		18,473	82.26	▲7.41
Registered electors		22,456		
Majority		462	2.54	▼17.79
BN hold		Swing		

Kedah state election, 1999
Party	Candidate	Votes	%	∆%
BN	Mohd Hadzir Ismail	7,758	60.17	▼11.46
PAS	Ahmad Zakaria	5,136	39.83	▲11.46
Total valid votes		12,894	100.00	
Total rejected ballots		420		
Unreturned ballots		256		
Turnout		13,570	74.85	▲3.42
Registered electors		18,129		
Majority		2,622	20.34	▼22.93
BN hold		Swing		

Kedah state election, 1995
Party	Candidate	Votes	%	∆%
BN	Mohd Hadzir Ismail	8,747	71.63	
PAS	Ahmad Majid	3,464	28.37	
Total valid votes		12,211	100.00	
Total rejected ballots		321		
Unreturned ballots		6		
Turnout		12,538	71.43	
Registered electors		17,552		
Majority		5,283	43.26	
BN hold		Swing		

Kedah state election, 1982
Party	Candidate	Votes	%	∆%
BN	Subramaniam Sundram	7,342	62.90	▼5.03
PAS	Ahmad Khasasi Mahamud	3,215	27.54	▼4.53
DAP	Karuppiah Ramasamy	930	7.97	▲7.97
Independent	Nadaraju Aparu	186	1.59	▲1.59
Total valid votes		11,673	100.00	
Total rejected ballots		217		
Unreturned ballots		0		
Turnout		11,890	75.76	▼0.82
Registered electors		15,695		
Majority		4,127	35.36	▼0.51
BN hold		Swing		

Kedah state election, 1978
Party	Candidate	Votes	%	∆%
BN	Subramaniam Annasamy Pillai	6,735	67.93	▼6.76
PAS	Mat Hassan Abdul	3,179	32.07	▲32.07
Total valid votes		9,914	100.00	
Total rejected ballots		417		
Unreturned ballots		0		
Turnout		10,331	76.58	▲0.96
Registered electors		13,491		
Majority		3,556	35.87	▼23.25
BN hold		Swing		

Kedah state election, 1974
Party	Candidate	Votes	%
BN	Mohamad Muslim Othman	5,931	74.69
KITA	Muniyandy Ramalingam	1,236	15.56
Parti Sosialis Rakyat Malaysia	Hasan Mat Amin	774	9.75
Total valid votes		7,941	100.00
Total rejected ballots		637	
Unreturned ballots		0	
Turnout		8,578	75.62
Registered electors		11,343	
Majority		4,695	59.12
This was a new constituency created.
