= Kota Darul Aman =

Electoral constituency in Kedah, Malaysia

Kota Darul Aman (N13)
Kedah constituency

State constituency
- Legislature: Kedah State Legislative Assembly
MLA
Teh Swee Leong
PH
- Constituency created: 1984
- First contested: 1986
- Last contested: 2018

Demographics
- Electors (2023): 25,829

Kota Darul Aman is a state constituency in Kedah, Malaysia, that has been represented in the Kedah State Legislative Assembly.

== Demographics ==
As of 2020, Kota Darul Aman has a population of 14,528 people.

Ethnic breakdown of Kota Darul Aman's electorate as of 2023
1. Chinese (56.6%)
2. Malay (35.6%)
3. Indian (6.80%)
4. Other ethnicities (1.05%)

== History ==
=== Polling districts ===
According to the gazette issued on 30 March 2018, the Kota Darul Aman constituency has a total of 22 polling districts.

State constituency	Polling districts	Code	Location
Kota Darul Aman (N13）	Kanchut	009/13/01	SK Wan Sulaiman Sidiq
Kota Darul Aman (N13）	Tambang Badak	009/13/02	SK Wan Sulaiman Sidiq
Kota Darul Aman (N13）	Bakar Bata	009/13/03	SMK Syed Mohamed Al-Bukhary
Kota Darul Aman (N13）	Jalan Lumpur	009/13/04	Taska Majilis Agama Islam Negeri Kedah, Cawangan Masjid Zahir, Alor Setar
Kota Darul Aman (N13）	Kampung Perak	009/13/05	SJK (C) Keat Hwa (H)
Kota Darul Aman (N13）	Seberang Nyonya	009/13/06	Pusat Rukun Tetangga Kampung Berjaya, Alor Setar
Kota Darul Aman (N13）	Jalan Raja	009/13/07	SJK (C) Keat Hwa (S)
Kota Darul Aman (N13）	Jalan Kolam	009/13/08	SMK St Michael
Kota Darul Aman (N13）	Pengkalan	009/13/09	SJK (C) Keat Hwa (S)
Kota Darul Aman (N13）	Jalan Seberang Perak	009/13/10	SK Seberang Perak
Kota Darul Aman (N13）	Taman Bahagia	009/13/11	SM Keat Hwa (Persendirian)
Kota Darul Aman (N13）	Kota Tanah	009/13/12	SM Keat Hwa (Persendirian)
Kota Darul Aman (N13）	Kampung Piew	009/13/13	SK Sg Korok Lama
Kota Darul Aman (N13）	Jalan Pegawai	009/13/14	Maktab Mahmud Puteri
Kota Darul Aman (N13）	Sungai Korok	009/13/15	SK Jalan Pegawai
Kota Darul Aman (N13）	Kampung Telok	009/13/16	SJK (C) Sin Min
Kota Darul Aman (N13）	Bandar Simpang Kuala	009/13/17	Maktab Mahmud Alor Setar
Kota Darul Aman (N13）	Rumah Pangsa Simpang Kuala	009/13/18	SJK (C) Sin Min
Kota Darul Aman (N13）	Kampung Pegawai	009/13/19	Wisma Lung Kong
Kota Darul Aman (N13）	Jalan Stesyen	009/13/20	SMK St Michael
Kota Darul Aman (N13）	Taman Bee Bee	009/13/21	SJK (C) Peng Min
Kota Darul Aman (N13）	Tongkang Yard	009/13/22	SK Seberang Perak Baru

=== Representation history ===
Kedah State Legislative Assemblyman for Kota Darul Aman
Assembly	No	Years	Member	Party
Constituency created from Bandar Alor Setar, Alor Merah, Derga and Pengkalan Kundor
Kota Darulaman
7th	N10	1986–1990	Cheah Chong Chiew (谢崇洲)	BN (MCA)
8th	N10	1990–1995	George John	GR (DAP)
Kota Darul Aman
9th	N13	1995–1999	Chong Kau Chai @ Chong Itt Chew (张日洲)	BN (MCA)
10th	N13	1999–2004	Chong Kau Chai @ Chong Itt Chew (张日洲)	BN (MCA)
11th	N13	2004–2008	Chong Kau Chai @ Chong Itt Chew (张日洲)	BN (MCA)
12th	N13	2008–2013	Lee Guan Aik (李源益)	PR (DAP)
13th	N13	2013–2015	Teoh Boon Kok @ Teoh Kai Kok (张开笔)	PR (DAP)
13th	N13	2015–2018	Teoh Boon Kok @ Teoh Kai Kok (张开笔)	PH (DAP)
14th	N13	2018–2023	Teh Swee Leong (郑瑞隆)	PH (DAP)
15th	N13	2023–present	Teh Swee Leong (郑瑞隆)	PH (DAP)

== Election results ==
Kedah state election, 2023: Kota Darul Aman
Party	Candidate	Votes	%	∆%
PH	Teh Swee Leong	11,178	66.91	▲66.91
PN	Chuah See Seng	5,528	33.09	▲33.09
Total valid votes		16,706	100.00	
Total rejected ballots		91		
Unreturned ballots		19		
Turnout		16,816	65.11	▼12.99
Registered electors		25,829		
Majority		5,650	33.82	▼16.68
PH hold		Swing		

Kedah state election, 2018: Kota Darul Aman
Party	Candidate	Votes	%	∆%
PKR	Teh Swee Leong	11,737	69.99	▲69.99
BN	Tan Eng Hwa	3,269	19.49	▼19.49
PAS	Zulkifli Che Haron	1,732	10.33	▲10.33
Parti Rakyat Malaysia	Tan Kang Yap	32	0.19	▲0.19
Total valid votes		16,770	100.00	
Total rejected ballots		229		
Unreturned ballots		0		
Turnout		17,046	78.10	▼2.40
Registered electors		21,835		
Majority		8,468	50.50	▲29.00
PKR hold		Swing		

Kedah state election, 2013: Kota Darul Aman
Party	Candidate	Votes	%	∆%
DAP	Teoh Boon Kok @ Teoh Kai Kok	7,387	60.48	▲6.47
BN	Loh Gim Hooi	4,761	38.98	▼7.01
Independent	Liew Kard Seong	39	0.32	▲0.32
Independent	Jayagopal A/L Adaikkalam	27	0.22	▲0.22
Total valid votes		12,214	100.00	
Total rejected ballots		202		
Unreturned ballots		30		
Turnout		12,446	80.50	▲11.86
Registered electors		15,466		
Majority		2,626	21.50	▲13.48
DAP hold		Swing		

Kedah state election, 2008: Kota Darul Aman
Party	Candidate	Votes	%	∆%
DAP	Lee Guan Aik	5,415	54.01	▲54.01
BN	Chong Kau Chai @ Chong Itt Chew	4,611	45.99	▼36.91
Total valid votes		10,026	100.00	
Total rejected ballots		280		
Unreturned ballots		49		
Turnout		10,355	68.64	▼0.66
Registered electors		15,087		
Majority		804	8.02	▼57.78
DAP gain from BN		Swing		?

Kedah state election, 2004: Kota Darul Aman
Party	Candidate	Votes	%	∆%
BN	Chong Kau Chai @ Chong Itt Chew	9,094	82.90	▲23.01
PKR	Yap Shui Fah	1,876	17.10	▲17.10
Total valid votes		10,970	100.00	
Total rejected ballots		235		
Unreturned ballots		37		
Turnout		11,232	69.30	▼2.47
Registered electors		16,207		
Majority		7,218	65.80	▲46.02
BN hold		Swing		

Kedah state election, 1999: Kota Darul Aman
Party	Candidate	Votes	%	∆%
BN	Chong Kau Chai @ Chong Itt Chew	8,580	59.89	▼9.03
DAP	Tan Foong Heong	5,928	40.11	▲9.03
Total valid votes		14,778	100.00	
Total rejected ballots		287		
Unreturned ballots		21		
Turnout		15,086	71.77	▲4.6
Registered electors		21,021		
Majority		2,922	19.78	▼18.06
BN hold		Swing		

Kedah state election, 1995: Kota Darul Aman
Party	Candidate	Votes	%	∆%
BN	Chong Kau Chai @ Chong Itt Chew	9,589	68.92	▲20.66
DAP	George John	4,324	31.08	▼20.66
Total valid votes		13,913	100.00	
Total rejected ballots		611		
Unreturned ballots		242		
Turnout		14,766	67.17	▲9.45
Registered electors		21,982		
Majority		5,265	37.84	▲34.36
BN gain from DAP		Swing		?

Kedah state election, 1990: Kota Darul Aman
Party	Candidate	Votes	%	∆%
DAP	George John	9,511	51.74	▲10.97
BN	Dr. Ch'ng Kok Heong	8,871	48.26	▲3.60
Total valid votes		18,382	100.00	
Total rejected ballots		664		
Unreturned ballots		0		
Turnout		19,046	57.72	▼6.48
Registered electors		28,126		
Majority		640	3.48	▼0.41
DAP gain from BN		Swing		?

Kedah state election, 1986: Kota Darul Aman
Party	Candidate	Votes	%
BN	Cheah Chong Chiew	7,689	44.66
DAP	George John	7,019	40.77
PAS	Haji Che Hassan Ishak	2,374	13.79
SDP	Mohd Noorik Abdul Rahman	134	0.78
Total valid votes		17,216	100.00
Total rejected ballots		315	
Unreturned ballots		0	
Turnout		17,531	64.20
Registered electors		27,306	
Majority		670	3.89
This was a new constituency created.
