= Juhari Bulat =

Malaysian politician

Yang Berbahagia Dato' Juhari Bulat DSSS SDK AMK
- جوهري بن بولت

Speaker of the Kedah State Legislative Assembly
- In office 25 August 2020 – 28 June 2023
- Monarch: Sallehuddin
- Menteri Besar: Muhammad Sanusi Md Nor
- Deputy: Ahmad Fadzli Hashim
- Preceded by: Ahmad Kassim
- Succeeded by: Zubir Ahmad
- Constituency: Ayer Hangat

Deputy Speaker of the Kedah State Legislative Assembly
- In office 4 July 2018 – 15 August 2020
- Monarch: Sallehuddin
- Menteri Besar: Mukhriz Mahathir
- Speaker: Ahmad Kassim
- Preceded by: Azmi Che Husain
- Succeeded by: Ahmad Fadzli Hashim
- Constituency: Ayer Hangat

Member of the Kedah State Legislative Assembly for Ayer Hangat
- In office 9 May 2018 – 12 August 2023
- Preceded by: Mohd Rawi Abdul Hamid (BN–UMNO)
- Succeeded by: Shamsilah Siru (PN–BERSATU)
- Majority: 1,532 (2018)

Faction represented in Kedah State Legislative Assembly
- 2018–2020: Pakatan Harapan
- 2020: Malaysian United Indigenous Party
- 2020–2023: Perikatan Nasional

Personal details
- Born: 7 November 1957 (age 68) Padang Matsirat, Langkawi, Kedah, Malaysia
- Citizenship: Malaysian
- Party: Malaysian United Indigenous Party (BERSATU)
- Other political affiliations: Pakatan Harapan (PH) (–2020); Perikatan Nasional (PN) (since 2020)
- Occupation: Politician

Juhari bin Bulat (born 7 November 1957) is a Malaysian politician who served as Speaker and Deputy Speaker of the Kedah State Legislative Assembly from August 2020 to June 2023 and from July 2018 to his promotion to the speakership in August 2020 respectively as well as Member of the Kedah State Legislative Assembly (MLA) for Ayer Hangat from May 2018 to August 2023. He is a member of the Malaysian United Indigenous Party (BERSATU), a component party of the Perikatan Nasional (PN) and formerly Pakatan Harapan (PH) coalitions.

== Election results ==
Kedah State Legislative Assembly
Year	Constituency	Candidate	Votes	Pct	Opponent(s)	Votes	Pct	Ballots cast	Majority	Turnout
2018	N01 Ayer Hangat	Juhari Bulat (BERSATU)	7,550	42.89%	Mohd Rawi Abd Hamid (UMNO)	6,018	34.19%	17,978	1,532	84.40%
2018	N01 Ayer Hangat	Juhari Bulat (BERSATU)	7,550	42.89%	Azlina Azinan (PAS)	4,034	22.92%	17,978	1,532	84.40%

== Honours ==
- Kedah
  - Member of the Order of the Crown of Kedah (AMK) (2002)
  - Companion of the Order of Loyalty to the Royal House of Kedah (SDK) (2019)
  - Knight Companion of the Order of Loyalty to Sultan Sallehuddin of Kedah (DSSS) – Dato' (2021)
