= Pantai Merdeka (state constituency) =

Pantai Merdeka (N27)
Kedah constituency

State constituency
- Legislature: Kedah State Legislative Assembly
MLA
Sharir Long
PN
- Constituency created: 1984
- First contested: 1986
- Last contested: 2023

Demographics
- Electors (2023): 51,502

Pantai Merdeka is a state constituency in Kedah, Malaysia, that has been represented in the Kedah State Legislative Assembly.

== Demographics ==
As of 2020, Pantai Merdeka has a population of 61,334 people.

Ethnic breakdown of Pantai Merdeka's electorate as of 2023
1. Malay (91.1%)
2. Chinese (6.05%)
3. Indian (2.36%)
4. Other ethnicities (0.49%)

== History ==
=== Polling districts ===
According to the gazette issued on 30 March 2018, the Pantai Merdeka constituency has a total of 19 polling districts.

State constituency	Polling districts	Code	Location
Pantai Merdeka (N27）	Bukit Kechik	015/27/01	SK Bukit Kechik
Pantai Merdeka (N27）	Bukit Meriam	015/27/02	SK Bukit Meriam
Pantai Merdeka (N27）	Sintok Bugis	015/27/03	Maktab Mahmud Kuala Muda
Pantai Merdeka (N27）	Padang Salim	015/27/04	SK Seri Kuala
Pantai Merdeka (N27）	Kuala Muda	015/27/05	Dewan KEDA Kampung Tepi Sungai
Pantai Merdeka (N27）	Haji Kudong	015/27/06	SK Haji Sulaiman
Pantai Merdeka (N27）	Kota Kuala Muda	015/27/07	SK Kota Kuala Muda
Pantai Merdeka (N27）	Sungai Mas	015/27/08	SMK Kota Kuala Muda
Pantai Merdeka (N27）	Rantau Panjang	015/27/09	SK Rantau Panjang
Pantai Merdeka (N27）	Pekan Tikam Batu	015/27/10	SJK (C) Peng Min
Pantai Merdeka (N27）	Kampung Simpor	015/27/11	SK Simpor
Pantai Merdeka (N27）	Batu Lintang	015/27/12	SK Simpor
Pantai Merdeka (N27）	Simpor Timor	015/27/13	SK Darulaman
Pantai Merdeka (N27）	Telok Wang	015/27/14	SMK Sungai Pasir
Pantai Merdeka (N27）	Kampung Berapit	015/27/15	SK Berapit
Pantai Merdeka (N27）	Kampung Tikam Batu	015/27/16	SK Tikam Batu
Pantai Merdeka (N27）	Pekula	015/27/17	SMK Pekula Jaya
Pantai Merdeka (N27）	Padang Temusu	015/27/18	SJK (C) Tai Tong
Pantai Merdeka (N27）	Pinang Tunggal	015/27/19	SMK Pinang Tunggal

=== Representation history ===
Kedah State Legislative Assemblyman for Pantai Merdeka
Assembly	No	Years	Member	Party
Constituency created from Tikam Batu and Merbok
7th	N23	1986–1990	Ghazali Bakar	BN (UMNO)
7th	N23	1990	Shuaib Lazim	BN (UMNO)
8th	N23	1990–1995	Abd. Manaf Ahmad	BN (UMNO)
9th	N27	1995–1999	Jamaludin Yusof	BN (UMNO)
10th	N27	1999–2004	Mohd Akhair Shafie	BN (UMNO)
11th	N27	2004–2008	Shuib Saedin	BN (UMNO)
12th	N27	2008–2013	Abdullah Jusof	PR (PAS)
13th	N27	2013–2018	Ali Yahaya	BN (UMNO)
14th	N27	2018–2020	Ahmad Fadzli Hashim	PAS
14th	N27	2020–2023	Ahmad Fadzli Hashim	PN (PAS)
15th	N27	2023–present	Sharir Long	PN (PAS)

== Election results ==
Kedah state election, 2023
Party	Candidate	Votes	%	∆%
PN	Sharir Long	32,225	79.06	▲79.06
BN	Wan Mohalina Wan Mohamad	8,534	20.94	▼9.94
Total valid votes		40,759	100.00	
Total rejected ballots		200		
Unreturned ballots		35		
Turnout		40,994	79.60	▼6.00
Registered electors		51,502		
Majority		23,691	58.12	▲43.38
PN hold		Swing		

Kedah state election, 2018
Party	Candidate	Votes	%	∆%
PAS	Ahmad Fadzli Hashim	14,133	45.62	▼0.84
BN	Ali Yahaya	9,567	30.88	▼21.49
PKR	Rosli Yusof	7,281	23.50	▲23.50
Total valid votes		30,981	100.00	
Total rejected ballots		347		
Unreturned ballots		0		
Turnout		31,523	85.60	▼3.80
Registered electors		36,810		
Majority		4,566	14.74	▲8.83
PAS gain from BN		Swing		?

Kedah state election, 2013
Party	Candidate	Votes	%	∆%
BN	Ali Yahaya	15,393	52.37	▲3.47
PAS	Abdullah Jusof	13,686	46.46	▼4.64
Independent	Mohd Yusof Lazim	316	1.17	▲1.17
Total valid votes		29,395	100.00	
Total rejected ballots		314		
Unreturned ballots		54		
Turnout		29,763	89.40	▲6.12
Registered electors		33,282		
Majority		1,707	5.91	▲3.71
BN gain from PAS		Swing		?

Kedah state election, 2008
Party	Candidate	Votes	%	∆%
PAS	Abdullah Jusof	11,654	51.10	▲7.48
BN	Shuib Saedin	11,151	48.90	▼7.48
Total valid votes		22,805	100.00	
Total rejected ballots		296		
Unreturned ballots		38		
Turnout		23,139	83.28	▼1.87
Registered electors		27,784		
Majority		503	2.20	▼10.56
PAS gain from BN		Swing		?

Kedah state election, 2004
Party	Candidate	Votes	%	∆%
BN	Shuib Saedin	11,742	56.38	▲4.96
PAS	Mat Akhair Shafie	9,081	43.62	▼4.96
Total valid votes		20,803	100.00	
Total rejected ballots		249		
Unreturned ballots		0		
Turnout		21,072	85.15	▲5.70
Registered electors		24,746		
Majority		2,661	12.76	▲9.92
BN hold		Swing		

Kedah state election, 1999
Party	Candidate	Votes	%	∆%
BN	Mat Akhair Shafie	9,102	51.42	▼11.69
PAS	Ustaz Md. Muslim	8,598	48.58	▲13.87
Total valid votes		17,700	100.00	
Total rejected ballots		391		
Unreturned ballots		141		
Turnout		18,232	79.45	▲3.11
Registered electors		22,949		
Majority		504	2.84	▼25.56
BN hold		Swing		

Kedah state election, 1995
Party	Candidate	Votes	%	∆%
BN	Jamaludin Yusof	9,857	63.11	▼1.96
PAS	Mohamad Isa Mahamud	5,421	34.71	▼0.22
DAP	Lim Pok Long	341	2.18	▲2.18
Total valid votes		15,641	100.00	
Total rejected ballots		330		
Unreturned ballots		1		
Turnout		15,950	76.34	▲1.49
Registered electors		20,893		
Majority		4,436	28.40	▼1.74
BN hold		Swing		

Kedah state election, 1990
Party	Candidate	Votes	%	∆%
BN	Abd. Manaf Ahmad	12,984	65.07	▲5.25
PAS	Azizan Maghribi	6,969	34.93	▼5.25
Total valid votes		19,953	100.00	
Total rejected ballots		522		
Unreturned ballots		0		
Turnout		20,475	74.85	▲6.73
Registered electors		27,353		
Majority		6,015	30.15	▲10.51
BN hold		Swing		

Kedah state by-election, 24 March 1990 Upon the death of incumbent, Ghazali Bakar
Party	Candidate	Votes	%	∆%
BN	Shuaib Lazim	10,384	59.82	▼4.73
PAS	Mohamad Muslim bin Othman	6,975	40.18	▲4.73
Total valid votes		17,359	100.00	
Total rejected ballots		171		
Unreturned ballots		0		
Turnout		17,530	68.12	▼5.30
Registered electors		25,734		
Majority		3,409	19.64	▼9.47
BN hold		Swing		

Kedah state election, 1986
Party	Candidate	Votes	%
BN	Ghazali Haji Bakar	11,458	64.55
PAS	Shuib Talib	6,292	35.45
Total valid votes		17,750	100.00
Total rejected ballots		463	
Unreturned ballots		0	
Turnout		18,213	73.42
Registered electors		24,808	
Majority		5,166	29.10
This was a new constituency created.
