= Ahmad Sulaiman =

Malaysian politician

Yang Berhormat Tuan Haji Ahmad Sulaiman BKM MLA
- أحمد سليمان

Member of the Kedah State Legislative Assembly for Belantek
- Incumbent
- Assumed office 12 August 2023
- Preceded by: Mohd Isa Shafie (GS–PAS)
- Majority: 14,156 (2023)

Personal details
- Party: Malaysian Islamic Party (PAS)
- Other political affiliations: Perikatan Nasional (PN)
- Occupation: Politician

Ahmad bin Sulaiman is a Malaysian politician who has served as Member of the Kedah State Legislative Assembly for Belantek since August 2023. He is a member of the Malaysian Islamic Party (PAS), a component party of the Perikatan Nasional (PN) coalition.

== Election results ==
Kedah State Legislative Assembly
Year	Constituency	Candidate	Votes	Pct	Opponent(s)	Votes	Pct	Ballots cast	Majority	Turnout
2023	N23 Belantek	Ahmad Sulaiman (PAS)	17,782	83.06%	Mazli Saipi (AMANAH)	3,626	16.94%	21,595	14,156	76.67%

== Honours ==
- Kedah
  - Recipient of the Public Service Star (2024)
