= Belantek =

Political subdivision in Malaysia

Belantek (N23)
Kedah constituency

State constituency
- Legislature: Kedah State Legislative Assembly
MLA
Ahmad Sulaiman
PN
- Constituency created: 1994
- First contested: 1995
- Last contested: 2023

Demographics
- Electors (2023): 28,165

Belantek is a state constituency in Kedah, Malaysia, that is represented in the Kedah State Legislative Assembly.

== Demographics ==
As of 2020, Belantek has a population of 30,089 people.

Ethnic breakdown of Belantek's electorate as of 2023
1. Malay (93.0%)
2. Other ethnicities (5.18%)
3. Chinese (1.62%)
4. Indian (0.19%)

== History ==
=== Polling districts ===
According to the gazette issued on 30 March 2018, the Belantek constituency has a total of 14 polling districts.

State constituency	Polling districts	Code	Location
Belantek (N23)	Kota Aur	013/23/01	SK Kota Aur
Belantek (N23)	Belantek	013/23/02	SK Seri Ampang Muda
Belantek (N23)	Kampung Gulau	013/23/03	SMK Gulau
Belantek (N23)	Kubang Kesom	013/23/04	SK Danglau
Belantek (N23)	Chepir	013/23/05	SK Chepir
Belantek (N23)	Kampung Chong	013/23/06	SK Paya Terendam
Belantek (N23)	Bendang Man	013/23/07	SMK Chepir
Belantek (N23)	Durian Burong	013/23/08	SK Sik Dalam
Belantek (N23)	Charok Kit	013/23/09	Kolej KEDA
Belantek (N23)	Kampung Dusun	013/23/10	SMK Sik
Belantek (N23)	Pekan Sik	013/23/11	SK Sik
Belantek (N23)	Kampung Sadu	013/23/12	SJK (C) Chung Hwa
Belantek (N23)	Kampung Namek	013/23/13	SK Seri Dusun
Belantek (N23)	Kampung Kemelong	013/23/14	Maktab Mahmud Sik

=== Representation history ===
Kedah State Legislative Assemblyman for Belantek
Assembly	No	Years	Member	Party
Constituency created from Jeneri
9th	N22	1995–1999	Hamlan Din	BN (UMNO)
10th	N22	1999–2004	Mohd Isa Shafie	BA (PAS)
11th	N23	2004–2008	Mohd Isa Shafie	PAS
12th	N23	2008–2013	Tajuddin Abdullah	BN (UMNO)
13th	N23	2013–2018	Tajuddin Abdullah	BN (UMNO)
14th	N23	2018–2020	Mohd Isa Shafie	GS (PAS)
14th	N23	2020–2023	Mohd Isa Shafie	PN (PAS)
14th	N23	2023	Vacant (Note: Vacant from 14 June 2023 until the 2023 state election due to the incumbent died in office.)	
15th	N23	2023–present	Ahmad Sulaiman	PN (PAS)

== Election results ==
Kedah state election, 2023: Belantek
Party	Candidate	Votes	%	∆%
PN	Ahmad Sulaiman	17,782	83.06	▲83.06
PH	Mazli Saipi	3,626	16.94	▲4.44
Total valid votes		21,408	100.00	
Total rejected ballots		170		
Unreturned ballots		18		
Turnout		21,595	76.67	▼8.53
Registered electors		28,165		
Majority		14,156	66.12	▲52.58
PN hold		Swing		

Kedah state election, 2018: Belantek
Party	Candidate	Votes	%	∆%
PAS	Mohd Isa Shafie	9,600	50.52	▲1.77
BN	Tajuddin Abdullah	7,026	36.98	▼10.73
PKR	Abdul Rashid Abdullah	2,376	12.50	▲12.50
Total valid votes		19,002	100.00	
Total rejected ballots		276		
Unreturned ballots		0		
Turnout		19,372	85.20	▼4.90
Registered electors		22,744		
Majority		2,574	13.54	▲8.96
PAS gain from BN		Swing		?

Kedah state election, 2013: Belantek
Party	Candidate	Votes	%	∆%
BN	Tajuddin Abdullah	9,822	52.29	▲1.43
PAS	Abu Bakar Baiklani Abu Hassan	8,980	47.71	▼1.43
Total valid votes		18,802	100.00	
Total rejected ballots		261		
Unreturned ballots		46		
Turnout		19,109	90.10	▲3.46
Registered electors		21,200		
Majority		842	4.58	▲2.86
BN hold		Swing		

Kedah state election, 2008: Belantek
Party	Candidate	Votes	%	∆%
BN	Tajuddin Abdullah	8,226	50.86	▲1.04
PAS	Muhammad Sanusi Md Nor	7,974	49.14	▼1.04
Total valid votes		16,175	100.00	
Total rejected ballots		254		
Unreturned ballots		21		
Turnout		16,475	86.64	▲1.24
Registered electors		19,016		
Majority		252	1.72	▲1.36
BN gain from PAS		Swing		?

Kedah state election, 2004: Belantek
Party	Candidate	Votes	%	∆%
PAS	Mohd Isa Shafie	7,310	50.18	▼1.90
BN	Mohd. Salleh Ismail	7,259	49.82	▲1.90
Total valid votes		14,569	100.00	
Total rejected ballots		212		
Unreturned ballots		6		
Turnout		14,787	85.40	▲3.31
Registered electors		17,314		
Majority		51	0.36	▼3.80
PAS hold		Swing		

Kedah state election, 1999: Belantek
Party	Candidate	Votes	%	∆%
PAS	Mohd Isa Shafie	6,556	52.08	▲2.99
BN	Siti Meriam Salleh	6,031	47.92	▼2.99
Total valid votes		12,587	100.00	
Total rejected ballots		276		
Unreturned ballots		13		
Turnout		12,876	82.09	▲4.38
Registered electors		15,686		
Majority		525	4.16	▲1.34
PAS gain from BN		Swing		?

Kedah state election, 1995: Belantek
Party	Candidate	Votes	%
BN	Hamlan Din	5,819	51.91
PAS	Salleh Shafie	5,391	49.09
Total valid votes		11,210	100.00
Total rejected ballots		246	
Unreturned ballots		16	
Turnout		11,472	77.71
Registered electors		14,762	
Majority		428	2.82
This was a new constituency created.
