= Kota Siputeh =

State constituency in Kedah, Malaysia

Kota Siputeh (N03)
Kedah constituency

State constituency
- Legislature: Kedah State Legislative Assembly
MLA
Ashraf Mustaqim
PN
- Constituency created: 1994
- First contested: 1995
- Last contested: 2023

Demographics
- Electors (2023): 29,777

Kota Siputeh is a state constituency in Kedah, Malaysia, that has been represented in the Kedah State Legislative Assembly.

== Demographics ==
As of 2020, Kota Siputeh has a population of 32,057 people.

Ethnic breakdown of Kota Siputeh's electorate as of 2023
1. Malay (91.6%)
2. Chinese (6.85%)
3. Other ethnicities (1.47%)
4. Indian (0.12%)

== History ==
=== Polling districts ===
According to the gazette issued on 30 March 2018, the Kota Siputeh constituency has a total of 17 polling districts.

| State constituency | Polling districts | Code | Location |
|---|---|---|---|
| Kota Seputeh (N03） | Kampung Bahagia | 005/03/01 | SMK Tunku Bendahara |
| Kota Seputeh (N03） | Kampung Pering | 005/03/02 | SJK (C) Pei Min |
| Kota Seputeh (N03） | Kampung Kandis | 005/03/03 | SK Kodiang (Baru) |
| Kota Seputeh (N03） | Pekan Kodiang | 005/03/04 | SK Kodiang (Lama) |
| Kota Seputeh (N03） | Kampung Kodiang | 005/03/05 | SK Tunku Bendahara |
| Kota Seputeh (N03） | Kampung Siputeh | 005/03/06 | SJK (C) Pei Min |
| Kota Seputeh (N03） | Megat Dewa | 005/03/07 | SK Megat Dewa |
| Kota Seputeh (N03） | Bukit Hantu | 005/03/08 | SK Dato' Syed Nahar |
| Kota Seputeh (N03） | Mesjid Paya | 005/03/09 | SK Dato' Syed Nahar |
| Kota Seputeh (N03） | Batu 4 Jalan Sanglang | 005/03/10 | Pertubuhan Peladang Kawasan B-2 Sanglang Batu 4, Jalan Sanglang |
| Kota Seputeh (N03） | Manggol | 005/03/11 | SK Manggol Bongor |
| Kota Seputeh (N03） | Tok Kepak | 005/03/12 | SK Tok Kepak |
| Kota Seputeh (N03） | Sg Korok 2 Mk Sanglang | 005/03/13 | SK Haji Wan Yahya, Jalan Sanglang |
| Kota Seputeh (N03） | Sg Korok | 005/03/14 | SK Haji Wan Yahya, Jalan Sanglang |
| Kota Seputeh (N03） | Kampung Sanglang | 005/03/15 | SK Sanglang |
| Kota Seputeh (N03） | Kerpan | 005/03/16 | SJK (C) Lam Min |
| Kota Seputeh (N03） | Kuala Sanglang | 005/03/17 | SMK Sanglang |

=== Representation history ===
Kedah State Legislative Assemblyman for Kota Siputeh
| Assembly | No | Years | Member | Party |
Constituency created from Jerlun, Jerlun and Jitra
| 9th | N04 | 1995–1999 | Abu Hassan Sarif | BN (UMNO) |
| 10th | N04 | 1999–2004 | Abu Hassan Sarif | BN (UMNO) |
| 11th | N03 | 2004–2008 | Abu Hassan Sarif | BN (UMNO) |
| 12th | N03 | 2008–2013 | Abu Hassan Sarif | BN (UMNO) |
| 13th | N03 | 2013–2018 | Abu Hassan Sarif | BN (UMNO) |
| 14th | N03 | 2018–2023 | Salmee Said | PH (AMANAH) |
| 15th | N03 | 2023–present | Mohd Ashraf Mustaqim Badrul Munir | PN (BERSATU) |

== Election results ==
Kedah state election, 2023: Kota Siputeh
| Party | Candidate | Votes | % | ∆% |
|---|---|---|---|---|
| PN | Mohd Ashraf Mustaqim Badrul Munir | 17,180 | 79.60 | ▲79.60 |
| PH | Salmee Said | 4,090 | 18.95 | ▼19.57 |
| Independent | Abdul Latif Ramli | 312 | 1.45 | ▲1.45 |
| Total valid votes | | 21,582 | 100.00 | |
| Total rejected ballots | | 108 | | |
| Unreturned ballots | | 13 | | |
| Turnout | | 21,703 | 72.89 | ▼8.81 |
| Registered electors | | 29,777 | | |
| Majority | | 13,090 | 60.65 | ▲52.88 |
| PN gain from PKR | | Swing | | ? |

Kedah state election, 2018: Kota Siputeh
| Party | Candidate | Votes | % | ∆% |
|---|---|---|---|---|
| PKR | Salmee Said | 7,265 | 38.52 | ▲38.52 |
| PAS | Mat Rejab Md Akhir | 5,798 | 30.75 | ▼13.46 |
| BN | Ahmad Azhar Abdullah | 5,795 | 30.73 | ▼25.06 |
| Total valid votes | | 18,858 | 100.00 | |
| Total rejected ballots | | 319 | | |
| Unreturned ballots | | 0 | | |
| Turnout | | 19,225 | 81.70 | ▼4.60 |
| Registered electors | | 23,544 | | |
| Majority | | 1,467 | 7.77 | ▼3.81 |
| PKR gain from BN | | Swing | | ? |

Kedah state election, 2013: Kota Siputeh
| Party | Candidate | Votes | % | ∆% |
|---|---|---|---|---|
| BN | Abu Hassan Sarif | 10,777 | 55.79 | ▲4.23 |
| PAS | Ismail bin W.Teh @ Jaziz | 8,539 | 44.21 | ▼4.23 |
| Total valid votes | | 19,316 | 100.00 | |
| Total rejected ballots | | 366 | | |
| Unreturned ballots | | 17 | | |
| Turnout | | 19,699 | 86.30 | ▲4.74 |
| Registered electors | | 22,816 | | |
| Majority | | 2,238 | 11.58 | ▲8.46 |
| BN hold | | Swing | | |

Kedah state election, 2008: Kota Siputeh
| Party | Candidate | Votes | % | ∆% |
|---|---|---|---|---|
| BN | Abu Hassan Sarif | 8,160 | 51.56 | ▼3.46 |
| PAS | Ismail bin W.Teh @ Jaziz | 7,665 | 48.44 | ▲3.46 |
| Total valid votes | | 15,825 | 100.00 | |
| Total rejected ballots | | 278 | | |
| Unreturned ballots | | 23 | | |
| Turnout | | 16,126 | 81.56 | ▼1.13 |
| Registered electors | | 19,771 | | |
| Majority | | 495 | 3.12 | ▼6.92 |
| BN hold | | Swing | | |

Kedah state election, 2004: Kota Siputeh
| Party | Candidate | Votes | % | ∆% |
|---|---|---|---|---|
| BN | Abu Hassan Sarif | 8,614 | 55.02 | ▲4.24 |
| PAS | Abdul Wahab Abdul Rahman | 7,041 | 44.98 | ▼4.24 |
| Total valid votes | | 15,655 | 100.00 | |
| Total rejected ballots | | 229 | | |
| Unreturned ballots | | 0 | | |
| Turnout | | 15,884 | 82.69 | ▲4.46 |
| Registered electors | | 19,209 | | |
| Majority | | 1,573 | 10.04 | ▲8.48 |
| BN hold | | Swing | | |

Kedah state election, 1999: Kota Siputeh
| Party | Candidate | Votes | % | ∆% |
|---|---|---|---|---|
| BN | Abu Hassan Sarif | 8,477 | 50.78 | ▲6.99 |
| PAS | Abdul Wahab Abdul Rahman | 8,216 | 49.22 | ▼6.99 |
| Total valid votes | | 16,693 | 100.00 | |
| Total rejected ballots | | 389 | | |
| Unreturned ballots | | 8 | | |
| Turnout | | 17,090 | 78.23 | ▲1.58 |
| Registered electors | | 21,847 | | |
| Majority | | 261 | 1.56 | ▼13.98 |
| BN hold | | Swing | | |

Kedah state election, 1995: Kota Siputeh
| Party | Candidate | Votes | % |
|---|---|---|---|
| BN | Abu Hassan Sarif | 9,483 | 57.77 |
| PAS | Abu Kassim bin Abdullah | 6,933 | 42.23 |
| Total valid votes | | 16,416 | 100.00 |
| Total rejected ballots | | 300 | |
| Unreturned ballots | | 11 | |
| Turnout | | 16,727 | 76.65 |
| Registered electors | | 21,822 | |
| Majority | | 2,550 | 15.54 |
This was a new constituency created.
