= Shamsilah Siru =

Malaysian politician

Yang Berhormat Puan Shamsilah Siru BKM MLA

Member of the Kedah State Legislative Assembly for Ayer Hangat
- Incumbent
- Assumed office 12 August 2023
- Preceded by: Juhari Bulat (PH–BERSATU)
- Majority: 11,032 (2023)

Personal details
- Born: Shamsilah binti Siru Malaysia
- Party: United Malays National Organisation (UMNO); Malaysian United Indigenous Party (BERSATU)
- Other political affiliations: Perikatan Nasional (PN)
- Occupation: Politician

Shamsilah binti Siru (born 10 August 1974) is a Malaysian politician. She served as Member of the Kedah State Legislative Assembly (MLA) for Ayer Hangat since August 2023. She is a member of Malaysian United Indigenous Party (BERSATU), a component party of Perikatan Nasional (PN) coalitions.

== Election results ==
Kedah State Legislative Assembly
Year	Constituency	Candidate	Votes	Pct	Opponent(s)	Votes	Pct	Ballots cast	Majority	Turnout
2023	N01 Ayer Hangat	Shamsilah Siru (BERSATU)	10,701	47.31%	Safwan Hanif (IND)	6,877	30.40%	22,861	3,824	68.95%
2023	N01 Ayer Hangat	Shamsilah Siru (BERSATU)	10,701	47.31%	Hisham Suhaily Othman (UMNO)	4,909	21.70%	22,861	3,824	68.95%
2023	N01 Ayer Hangat	Shamsilah Siru (BERSATU)	10,701	47.31%	Zulfadli Mohd Yusoff (IND)	134	0.59%	22,861	3,824	68.95%

== Honours ==
- Kedah
  - Recipient of the Public Service Star (BKM) (2004)
