= Ahmad Kasim =

Malaysian politician

Yang Berbahagia Dato' Paduka Ahmad Kasim DPSS DSDK SDK JP
- أحمد قاسم

14th Speaker of the Kedah State Legislative Assembly
- In office 4 July 2018 – 15 August 2020
- Monarch: Sallehuddin
- Menteri Besar: Mukhriz Mahathir (2018–2020); Muhammad Sanusi Md Nor (2020)
- Preceded by: Md Rozai Safian
- Succeeded by: Juhari Bulat
- Constituency: non-MLA (Pakatan Harapan)

Member of the Malaysian Parliament for Kuala Kedah
- In office 8 March 2008 – 5 May 2013
- Preceded by: Hashim Jahaya (BN–UMNO)
- Succeeded by: Azman Ismail (PR–PKR)
- Majority: 7,018 (2008)

Personal details
- Born: 24 March 1963 (age 63) Kedah, Federation of Malaya (now Malaysia)
- Citizenship: Malaysian
- Party: People's Justice Party (PKR)
- Other political affiliations: Pakatan Rakyat (PR)
- Occupation: Politician

Ahmad bin Kasim (born 24 March 1963) is a Malaysian politician. He was the Member of the Parliament of Malaysia for the Kuala Kedah constituency in Kedah for one term from 2008 to 2013. He sat in Parliament as a member of the People's Justice Party (PKR) in the opposition Pakatan Rakyat coalition.

Kassim was elected to the Kuala Kedah seat in the 2008 election, defeating Hashim Jahaya of the ruling Barisan Nasional coalition. He served one term in Parliament; before the 2013 election he was replaced as PKR's candidate for the seat by Azman Ismail, who went on to retain the seat for the opposition party.

== Election results ==
Parliament of Malaysia
Year	Constituency	Candidate	Votes	Pct	Opponent(s)	Votes	Pct	Ballots cast	Majority	Turnout
2008	P010 Kuala Kedah	Ahmad Kasim (PKR)	35,689	55.45%	Hashim Jahaya (UMNO)	28,671	44.55%	65,750	7,018	79.09%

== Honours ==
- Kedah
  - Knight Commander of the Order of Loyalty to Sultan Sallehuddin of Kedah (DPSS) – Dato' Paduka (2019)
  - Knight Companion of the Order of Loyalty to the Royal House of Kedah (DSDK) – Dato' (2013)
  - Companion of the Order of Loyalty to the Royal House of Kedah (SDK) (2011)
  - Justice of the Peace of Kedah (JP) (2009)
