= Wan Romani Wan Salim =

Malaysian politician

Yang Berhormat Dato' Wan Romani Wan Salim DSSS MLA
- وان رماني وان سليم

Member of the Kedah State Executive Council
- In office 20 May 2020 – 14 August 2023
- Monarch: Sallehuddin
- Menteri Besar: Muhammad Sanusi Md Nor
- Portfolio: Information, Communications, Multimedia, Domestic Trade and Consumer Affairs
- Preceded by: Mohd Firdaus Ahmad (Information, Communications and Multimedia); Summugam Rengasamy (Domestic Trade and Consumer Affairs)
- Succeeded by: Mohd Azam Abd Samat (Information & Communications); Muhamad Radhi Mat Din (Consumerism); Portfolios abolished (Multimedia & Domestic Trade)
- Constituency: Bukit Pinang

Member of the Kedah State Legislative Assembly for Bukit Pinang
- Incumbent
- Assumed office 5 May 2013
- Preceded by: Md Roshidi Osman (PR–PAS)
- Majority: 1,672 (2013); 3,212 (2018); 18,261 (2023)

Personal details
- Born: Wan Romani bin Wan Salim; 1962 (age 63–64) Pokok Sena, Kedah, Malaysia
- Citizenship: Malaysian
- Party: Malaysian Islamic Party (PAS)
- Other political affiliations: Pakatan Rakyat (PR) (2008–2015); Gagasan Sejahtera (GS) (2016–2020); Perikatan Nasional (PN) (since 2020)
- Education: Universiti Teknologi Mara
- Occupation: Politician

Wan Romani bin Wan Salim (born 1951) is a Malaysian politician who has served as Member of the Kedah State Legislative Assembly (MLA) for Bukit Pinang since May 2013. He served as Member of the Kedah State Executive Council (EXCO) in the Perikatan Nasional (PN) state administration under Menteri Besar Muhammad Sanusi Md Nor from May 2020 to August 2023. He is a member of the Malaysian Islamic Party (PAS), a component party of the PN and formerly Gagasan Sejahtera (GS) as well as Pakatan Rakyat (PR) coalitions.

== Election results ==
Kedah State Legislative Assembly
| Year | Constituency | Candidate | Votes | Pct | Opponent(s) | Votes | Pct | Ballots cast | Majority | Turnout% |
|---|---|---|---|---|---|---|---|---|---|---|
| 2013 | N10 Bukit Pinang | Wan Romani Wan Salim (PAS) | 12,152 | 53.69% | Che Mat Dzaher Ahmad (UMNO) | 10,480 | 46.31% | 22,890 | 1,672 | 86.62% |
| 2018 | N10 Bukit Pinang | Wan Romani Wan Salim (PAS) | 10,432 | 43.57% | Che Mat Dzaher Ahmad (PKR) | 7,220 | 30.16% | 24,337 | 3,212 | 83.80% |
| 2018 | N10 Bukit Pinang | Wan Romani Wan Salim (PAS) | 10,432 | 43.57% | Mohammad Nawar Ariffin (UMNO) | 6,289 | 26.27% | 24,337 | 3,212 | 83.80% |
| 2023 | N10 Bukit Pinang | Wan Romani Wan Salim (PAS) | 23,041 | 82.82% | Hazir Mat Zain (PKR) | 4,780 | 17.18% | 28,030 | 18,261 | 76.19% |

== Honours ==
- Kedah
  - Knight Companion of the Order of Loyalty to Sultan Sallehuddin of Kedah (DSSS) – Dato' (2022)
