= Ayer Hangat =

Political subdivision in Malaysia

Ayer Hangat (N01)
Kedah constituency

State constituency
- Legislature: Kedah State Legislative Assembly
MLA
Shamsilah Siru
PN
- Constituency created: 2003
- First contested: 2004
- Last contested: 2023

Demographics
- Electors (2023): 33,156

Ayer Hangat is a state constituency in Kedah, Malaysia, that has been represented in the Kedah State Legislative Assembly.

The state constituency was first contested in 2004 and is mandated to return a single Assemblyman to the Kedah State Legislative Assembly under the first-past-the-post voting system.

== Demographics ==
As of 2020, Ayer Hangat has a population of 44,555 people.

Ethnic breakdown of Ayer Hangat's electorate as of 2023
1. Malay (95.0%)
2. Indian (2.60%)
3. Chinese (1.25%)
4. Other ethnicities (1.15%)

== History ==
=== Polling districts ===
According to the gazette issued on 30 March 2018, the Ayer Hangat constituency has a total of 13 polling districts.

State constituency	Polling districts	Code	Location
Ayer Hangat (N01)	Kuala Teriang	004/01/01	SK Kuala Teriang
Ayer Hangat (N01)	Ewa	004/01/02	SK Ewa
Ayer Hangat (N01)	Padang Lalang	004/01/03	SK Penghulu Ahmad
Ayer Hangat (N01)	Kilim	004/01/04	SK Kilim
Ayer Hangat (N01)	Ladang Sungai Raya	004/01/05	SK Seri Lagenda
Ayer Hangat (N01)	Wang Tok Rendong	004/01/06	Dewan Homestay Desa Wang Tok Rendong
Ayer Hangat (N01)	Ulu Melaka	004/01/07	SK Ulu Melaka
Ayer Hangat (N01)	Nyior Chabang	004/01/08	SK Nyior Cabang
Ayer Hangat (N01)	Padang Kandang	004/01/09	SJK (C) Min Nam
Ayer Hangat (N01)	Padang Matsirat	004/01/10	SK Padang Matsirat
Ayer Hangat (N01)	Kampung Atas	004/01/11	SMK Tunku Putra
Ayer Hangat (N01)	Bukit Kemboja	004/01/12	Maktab Mahmud Langkawi
Ayer Hangat (N01)	Makam Mahsuri	004/01/13	Maktab Mahmud Langkawi

=== Representation history ===
Kedah State Legislative Assemblyman for Ayer Hangat
Assembly	No	Years	Member	Party
Constituency created from Padang Matsirat and Kuah
11th	N01	2004–2008	Md Hasan Bulat	BN (UMNO)
12th	N01	2008–2013	Mohd Rawi Abdul Hamid	BN (UMNO)
13th	N01	2013–2018	Mohd Rawi Abdul Hamid	BN (UMNO)
14th	N01	2018–2020	Juhari Bulat	PH (BERSATU)
14th	N01	2020–2023	Juhari Bulat	PN (BERSATU)
15th	N01	2023–present	Shamsilah Siru	PN (BERSATU)

== Election results ==
Kedah state election, 2023: Ayer Hangat
Party	Candidate	Votes	%	∆%
PN	Shamsilah Siru	10,701	47.31	▲47.31
Independent	Safwan Hanif	6,877	30.40	▲30.40
BN	Hisham Suhaily Othman	4,909	21.70	▼12.49
Independent	Zulfadli Mohd Yusoff	134	0.59	▲0.59
Total valid votes		22,621	100.00	
Total rejected ballots		222		
Unreturned ballots		18		
Turnout		22,861	68.95	▼15.45
Registered electors		33,156		
Majority		3,824	16.91	▲8.21
PN gain from PKR		Swing		?

Kedah state election, 2018: Ayer Hangat
Party	Candidate	Votes	%	∆%
PKR	Juhari Bulat	7,550	42.89	▲42.89
BN	Mohd Rawi Abdul Hamid	6,018	34.19	▼31.41
PAS	Azlina Azinan	4,034	22.92	▼11.48
Total valid votes		17,602	100.00	
Total rejected ballots		305		
Unreturned ballots		0		
Turnout		17,602	84.40	▼0.84
Registered electors		21,297		
Majority		1,532	8.70	▼22.50
PKR gain from BN		Swing		?

Kedah state election, 2013: Ayer Hangat
Party	Candidate	Votes	%	∆%
BN	Mohd Rawi Abdul Hamid	11,166	65.60	▲11.11
PAS	Zubir Ahmad	5,855	34.40	▼11.11
Total valid votes		17,021	100.00	
Total rejected ballots		292		
Unreturned ballots		0		
Turnout		17,313	85.24	▲4.66
Registered electors		20,130		
Majority		5,311	31.20	▲22.22
BN hold		Swing		

Kedah state election, 2008: Ayer Hangat
Party	Candidate	Votes	%	∆%
BN	Mohd Rawi Abdul Hamid	6,888	54.49	▼6.62
PAS	Zubir Ahmad	5,753	45.51	▲6.82
Total valid votes		12,641	100.00	
Total rejected ballots		297		
Unreturned ballots		13		
Turnout		12,951	80.58	▼2.63
Registered electors		16,072		
Majority		1,135	8.98	▼13.64
BN hold		Swing		

Kedah state election, 2004: Ayer Hangat
Party	Candidate	Votes	%
BN	Yusof Ismail	7,597	61.31
PAS	Md Hasan Bulat	4,794	38.69
Total valid votes		12,391	100.00
Total rejected ballots		262	
Unreturned ballots		6	
Turnout		12,659	83.21
Registered electors		15,213	
Majority		2,803	22.62
This was a new constituency created.
