= Kedah State Legislative Assembly =

State Legislative Assembly

Kedah State Legislative Assembly Dewan Undangan Negeri Kedah ديوان اوندڠن نݢري قدح
- 15th Kedah State Legislative Assembly

Type
- Type: Unicameral

History
- Founded: 1959
- Preceded by: Kedah State Council (3 August 1905–31 March 1959)

Leadership
- Sultan: Al-Aminul Karim Sultan Sallehuddin Al-Marhum Sultan Badlishah since 12 September 2017
- Speaker: Zubir Ahmad, PN–PAS since 25 September 2023
- Deputy Speaker: Abdul Razak Khamis, PN–WAWASAN since 25 September 2023
- Menteri Besar: Muhammad Sanusi Md Nor, PN–PAS since 17 May 2020
- Opposition Leader: Bau Wong Bau Ek, PH–PKR since 26 November 2023
- Secretary: Mohamad Azlee Ahmad

Structure
- Seats: 36; Quorum: 12; Simple majority: 19; Two-thirds majority: 24
- Political groups: (As of 7 August 2026) Government (33); PN (24): PAS (21); WAWASAN (2); GERAKAN (1); BERSATU (9) Opposition (3); PH (3): PKR (2); DAP (1); Speaker (1) PN (non-MLA)
- Committees: 5: Committee of Selection; Public Accounts Committee; House Committee; Committee of Privileges; Standing Orders Committee

Elections
- Voting system: Plurality: First-past-the-post (36 single-member constituencies)
- Last election: 12 August 2023
- Next election: By 24 November 2028

Meeting place
- Wisma Darul Aman, Alor Setar, Kedah

Website
- mmk.kedah.gov.my

The Kedah State Legislative Assembly (Malay: Dewan Undangan Negeri Kedah) is the state legislature of the Malaysian state of Kedah. It is a unicameral institution, consisting of a total of 36 lawmakers representing single-member constituencies throughout the state.

Members of the unicameral state legislature are called state assemblymen. The Legislative Assembly building is located at the Wisma Darul Aman in the state capital, Alor Setar.

Out of the 36 seats, 33 are held by the Perikatan Nasional (PN) ruling coalition after the 2023 state election. Thus, the PN coalition commands a two-thirds supermajority in the assembly. Meanwhile, Pakatan Harapan (PH) that comprises People's Justice Party (PKR) holds just 2 seats, followed by Democratic Action Party (DAP) which retain only single seat.

Map of current constituencies

== Current composition ==
Government				Opposition
PN			BERSATU	PH
24			9	3
21	2	1	9	2	1
PAS	WAWASAN	GERAKAN	BERSATU	PKR	DAP

No.	Parliamentary Constituency	No.	State Constituency	Member	Coalition (Party)	Post
-	-	#	Non-MLA	Zubir Ahmad	PN (PAS)	Speaker
P004	Langkawi	N01	Ayer Hangat	Shamsilah Siru	BERSATU	N/A
P004	Langkawi	N02	Kuah	Amar Pared Mahamud	BERSATU	N/A
P005	Jerlun	N03	Kota Siputeh	Mohd Ashraf Mustaqim Badrul Munir	BERSATU	N/A
P005	Jerlun	N04	Ayer Hitam	Azhar Ibrahim	PN (PAS)	N/A
P006	Kubang Pasu	N05	Bukit Kayu Hitam	Halimaton Shaadiah Saad	BERSATU	EXCO Member
P006	Kubang Pasu	N06	Jitra	Haim Hilman Abdullah	PN (PAS)	EXCO Member
P007	Padang Terap	N07	Kuala Nerang	Mohamad Yusoff @ Munir Zakaria	PN (PAS)	EXCO Member
P007	Padang Terap	N08	Pedu	Mohd Radzi Md Amin	PN (PAS)	N/A
P008	Pokok Sena	N09	Bukit Lada	Salim Mahmood	PN (PAS)	N/A
P008	Pokok Sena	N10	Bukit Pinang	Wan Romani Wan Salim	PN (PAS)	N/A
P008	Pokok Sena	N11	Derga	Muhamad Amri Wahab	BERSATU	N/A
P009	Alor Setar	N12	Suka Menanti	Dzowahir Ab Ghani (Note: On 8 May, Dzowahir had his party membership terminated and thus became an independent.)	PN (WAWASAN)	EXCO Member
P009	Alor Setar	N13	Kota Darul Aman	Teh Swee Leong	PH (DAP)	N/A
P009	Alor Setar	N14	Alor Mengkudu	Muhamad Radhi Mat Din	PN (PAS)	EXCO Member
P010	Kuala Kedah	N15	Anak Bukit	Rashidi Razak	PN (PAS)	N/A
P010	Kuala Kedah	N16	Kubang Rotan	Mohd Salleh Saidin	BERSATU	EXCO Member
P010	Kuala Kedah	N17	Pengkalan Kundor	Mardhiyyah Johari	PN (PAS)	N/A
P011	Pendang	N18	Tokai	Mohd Hayati Othman	PN (PAS)	N/A
P011	Pendang	N19	Sungai Tiang	Abdul Razak Khamis (Note: On 8 May, Abdul Razak had his party membership terminated and thus became an independent.)	PN (WAWASAN)	Deputy Speaker
P012	Jerai	N20	Sungai Limau	Mohd Azam Abd Samat	PN (PAS)	EXCO Member
P012	Jerai	N21	Guar Chempedak	Abdul Ghafar Saad	BERSATU	N/A
P012	Jerai	N22	Gurun	Baddrol Bakhtiar	PN (PAS)	N/A
P013	Sik	N23	Belantek	Ahmad Sulaiman	PN (PAS)	N/A
P013	Sik	N24	Jeneri	Muhammad Sanusi Md Nor	PN (PAS)	Menteri Besar
P014	Merbok	N25	Bukit Selambau	Azizan Hamzah	PN (PAS)	N/A
P014	Merbok	N26	Tanjong Dawai	Hanif Ghazali	PN (PAS)	N/A
P015	Sungai Petani	N27	Pantai Merdeka	Sharir Long	PN (PAS)	N/A
P015	Sungai Petani	N28	Bakar Arang	Adam Loh Wei Chai	PH (PKR)	N/A
P015	Sungai Petani	N29	Sidam	Bau Wong Bau Ek	PH (PKR)	Opposition Leader
P016	Baling	N30	Bayu	Mohd Taufik Yaacob	BERSATU	N/A
P016	Baling	N31	Kupang	Najmi Ahmad	PN (PAS)	N/A
P016	Baling	N32	Kuala Ketil	Mansor Zakaria	PN (PAS)	EXCO Member
P017	Padang Serai	N33	Merbau Pulas	Siti Ashah Ghazali	PN (PAS)	EXCO Member
P017	Padang Serai	N34	Lunas	Khairul Anuar Ramli	BERSATU	N/A
P018	Kulim-Bandar Baharu	N35	Kulim	Wong Chia Zhen	PN (GERAKAN)	EXCO Member
P018	Kulim-Bandar Baharu	N36	Bandar Baharu	Mohd Suffian Yusoff	PN (PAS)	N/A

== Seating arrangement ==
Vacant	Vacant	Vacant	Vacant		N19 Sungai Tiang (Deputy Speaker)	N22 Gurun	N23 Belantek	N21 Guar Chempedak
Vacant	Vacant	Vacant	Vacant		N04 Ayer Hitam	N26 Tanjung Dawai	N09 Bukit Lada	N08 Pedu
	Vacant	N03 Kota Siputeh	N02 Kuah		N16 Kubang Rotan (EXCO Member)	N12 Suka Menanti (EXCO Member)	N10 Bukit Pinang
		N36 Bandar Baharu	C		B	N32 Kuala Ketil (EXCO Member)
Vacant	N15 Anak Bukit	N17 Pengkalan Kundor	D	Sergeant-at-Arm	A	N07 Kuala Nerang (EXCO Member)	N18 Tokai	N31 Kupang
Vacant	N30 Bayu	N01 Ayer Hangat	D		A	N05 Bukit Kayu Hitam (EXCO Member)	N35 Kulim (EXCO Member)	Vacant
Vacant	N27 Pantai Merdeka	Vacant	D	the Mace	A	N06 Jitra (EXCO Member)	N14 Alor Mengkudu (EXCO Member)	Vacant
Vacant	N11 Derga	N28 Bakar Arang	D	the Mace	A	N20 Sungai Limau (EXCO Member)	State Financial Officer	Vacant
Vacant	N34 Lunas	N13 Kota Darul Aman	D		A	N33 Merbau Pulas (EXCO Member)	State Legal Advisor	Vacant
Vacant	N25 Bukit Selambau	N29 Sidam (Opposition Leader)	D	Secretary	A	N24 Jeneri (Menteri Besar)	State Secretary	Vacant
Vacant				Speaker				Vacant
				Sultan

== Role ==
The Kedah State Legislative Assembly's main function is to enact laws that apply in the state. It is also the forum for members to voice their opinions on the state government's policies and implementation of those policies. Under the law, assemblymen are given the right to freely discuss current issues such as public complaints. On financial matters, the Assembly approves supply to the government and ensures that the funds are spent as approved and in the tax-payers' interest.

The State Executive Council (EXCO) is appointed from members of the State Assembly. Led by the Menteri Besar, it exercises executive power on behalf of the Sultan and is responsible to the Assembly.

== Speakers Roll of Honour ==
The following is the Speaker of the Kedah State Legislative Assembly Roll of Honour, since 1959:

No.	Speaker	Term start	Term end	Party	Constituency
1	Ahmad Tunku Ismail	20 May 1959	28 February 1964	Alliance (UMNO)	Sala
2	Syed Omar Syed Abdullah Shahabudin	25 April 1964	7 December 1967	Alliance (UMNO)	Baling Barat
3	Salleh Ishak	10 May 1969	30 July 1974	Alliance (UMNO)	Sungei Patani Luar
4	Abdullah Ismail	27 October 1974	11 June 1978	BN (UMNO)	Yan
4	Abdullah Ismail	26 July 1978	12 February 1981	BN (UMNO)	Yan
5	Hussain Mohd. Zain	27 February 1981	5 April 1982	BN (UMNO)	Non-MLA
6	Shaari Abu Bakar	22 April 1982	18 July 1986	BN (UMNO)	Pendang
7	Seroji Haron	3 August 1986	4 October 1990	BN (UMNO)	Bayu
8	Abdullah Ismail	27 October 1990	1995	BN (UMNO)	Yan
9	Zainol Md Isa	5 June 1995	31 July 1998	BN (UMNO)	Kupang
10	Badruddin Amiruldin	26 December 1999	2004	BN (UMNO)	Non-MLA
11	Md Rozai Safian	2004	2008	BN (UMNO)	Non-MLA
12	Abdul Isa Ismail	2008	2013	PR (PAS)	Non-MLA
13	Md Rozai Safian	2013	2018	BN (UMNO)	Non-MLA
14	Ahmad Kassim	4 July 2018	14 August 2020	PH (PKR)	Non-MLA
15	Juhari Bulat	25 August 2020	29 July 2023	PN (BERSATU)	Ayer Hangat
16	Zubir Ahmad	25 September 2023	present	PN (PAS)	Non-MLA

== Election pendulum ==
The 2023 Kedah state election witnessed 33 governmental seats and 3 non-governmental seats filled the Kedah State Legislative Assembly. The government side has 29 safe seats and 2 fairly safe seats, while the non-government side has only a safeseat.

2023 Kedah state election
.

GOVERNMENT SEATS
Marginal
Ayer Hangat	Shamsilah Siru	BERSATU	47.31
Lunas	Khairul Anuar Ramli	BERSATU	52.99
Fairly safe
Derga	Muhamad Amri Wahab	BERSATU	56.72
Kulim	Wong Chia Zhen	GERAKAN	59.97
Safe
Bukit Selambau	Azizan Hamzah	PAS	60.13
Gurun	Baddrol Bakhtiar	PAS	61.37
Pedu	Mohd Radzi Md Amin	PAS	64.21
Kuah	Amar Pared Mahamud	BERSATU	64.34
Suka Menanti	Dzowahir Ab Ghani	BERSATU	64.44
Kubang Rotan	Mohd Salleh Saidin	BERSATU	65.36
Pengkalan Kundor	Mardhiyyah Johari	PAS	66.38
Alor Mengkudu	Muhamad Radhi Mat Din	PAS	68.19
Bandar Baharu	Dr. Muhammad Suffian Yusoff	PAS	71.38
Bukit Kayu Hitam	Halimaton Shaadiah Saad	BERSATU	72.92
Sungai Tiang	Abdul Razak Khamis	BERSATU	72.98
Bayu	Mohd Taufik Yaacob	BERSATU	73.76
Merbau Pulas	Dr. Siti Ashah Ghazali	PAS	73.78
Kuala Ketil	Mansor Zakaria	BERSATU	74.96
Jitra	Dr. Haim Hilman Abdullah	PAS	75.46
Guar Chempedak	Abdul Ghafar Saad	BERSATU	76.40
Tanjong Dawai	Hanif Ghazali	PAS	76.94
Bukit Lada	Salim Mahmood	PAS	78.12
Ayer Hitam	Azhar Ibrahim	PAS	78.34
Anak Bukit	Rashidi Razak	PAS	78.63
Kupang	Najmi Ahmad	PAS	78.81
Pantai Merdeka	Shahrir Long	PAS	79.06
Jeneri	Muhammad Sanusi Md Nor	PAS	79.08
Kota Siputeh	Mohd Ashraf Mustaqim Badrul Munir	BERSATU	79.60
Kuala Nerang	Munir @ Mohamad Yusoff Zakaria	PAS	82.35
Bukit Pinang	Wan Romani Wan Salim	PAS	82.82
Belantek	Ahmad Sulaiman	PAS	83.06
Tokai	Dr. Mohd Hayati Othman	PAS	84.43
Sungai Limau	Mohd Azam Abd Samat	PAS	84.88

NON-GOVERNMENT SEATS
Marginal
Sidam	Baw Wong Bau Ek	PKR	51.12
Bakar Arang	Adam Loh Wee Chai	PKR	54.41
Safe
Kota Darul Aman	Teh Swee Leong	DAP	66.91

== List of Assemblies ==
Assembly	Term began	Members	Committee	Governing parties
State Council	1955	27	Tunku Ismail I	Alliance (UMNO–MCA)
1st	1959	24	Syed Omar I	Alliance (UMNO–MCA–MIC)
2nd	1964	24	Syed Omar II (1964–1967); Syed Ahmad I (1967–1969)	Alliance (UMNO–MCA–MIC)
3rd	1969	24	Syed Ahmad II	Alliance (UMNO–MCA) (1969–1972); Alliance (UMNO–MCA)–PAS–GERAKAN (1972–1973)
3rd	1969	24	Syed Ahmad II	BN (UMNO–MCA–PAS–GERAKAN) (1973–1974)
4th	1974	26	Syed Ahmad III	BN (UMNO–MCA–PAS–GERAKAN) (1974–1977); BN (UMNO–MCA–GERAKAN) (1977–1978)
5th	1978	26	Syed Nahar I	BN (UMNO–MCA–MIC–GERAKAN)
6th	1982	26	Syed Nahar II (1982–1985); Osman I (1985–1986)	BN (UMNO–MCA–MIC–GERAKAN)
7th	1986	26	Osman III	BN (UMNO–MCA–MIC–GERAKAN)
8th	1990	28	Osman III	BN (UMNO–MCA–MIC)
9th	1995	36	Osman IV (1995–1996); Sanusi Junid (1996–1999)	BN (UMNO–MCA–MIC–GERAKAN)
10th	1999	36	Syed Razak I	BN (UMNO–MCA–MIC–GERAKAN)
11th	2004	36	Syed Razak II (2004–2005); Mahdzir (2005–2008)	BN (UMNO–MCA–MIC–GERAKAN)
12th	2008	36	Azizan	PR (PAS–PKR–DAP)
13th	2013	36	Mukhriz I (2013–2016); Ahmad Bashah (2016–2018)	BN (UMNO–MCA)
14th	2018	36	Mukhriz II (2018–2020)	PH (BERSATU–PKR–AMANAH–DAP)
14th	2018	36	Muhammad Sanusi I (2020–2023)	PN (PAS–BERSATU)–BN (UMNO) (2020–2022); PN (PAS–BERSATU) (2022–2023)
15th	2023	36	Muhammad Sanusi II	PN (PAS–BERSATU–GERAKAN) (2022–2026); PN (PAS–GERAKAN–WAWASAN)–BERSATU (2026–present)

== See also ==
- List of State Seats Representatives in Malaysia
- State legislative assemblies of Malaysia
