= 2023 Kedah state election =

Malaysian state legislative election

- 12 August 2023

All 36 seats in the Kedah State Legislative Assembly 19 seats needed for a majority
- Turnout: 73.86%
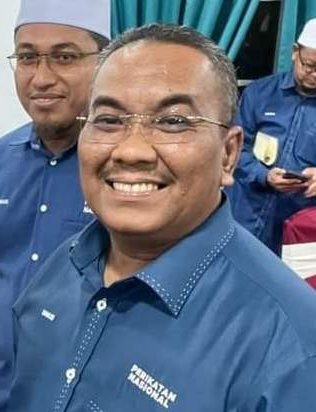

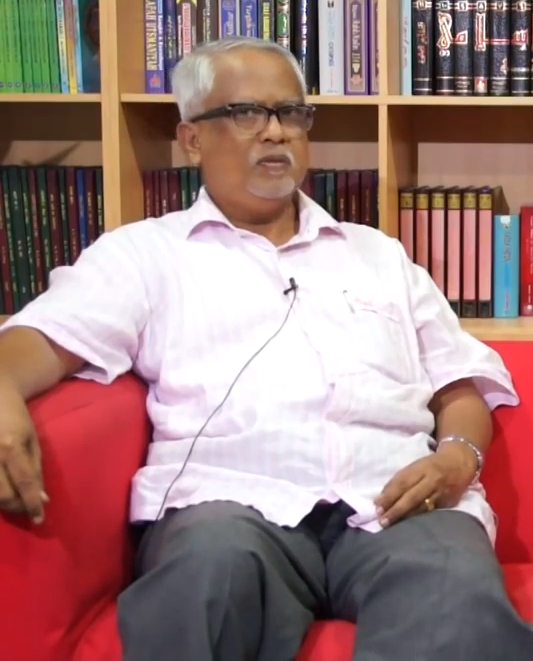
	Majority party	Minority party
Leader	Muhammad Sanusi Md Nor	Mahdzir Khalid; Mahfuz Omar
Party	PAS	UMNO; AMANAH
Alliance	Perikatan Nasional Parties: PAS; BERSATU; GERAKAN	Barisan Nasional; Pakatan Harapan Parties: UMNO; PKR; AMANAH; DAP
Leader's seat	Jeneri	Mahdzir: Pedu (lost); Mahfuz: Alor Mengkudu (lost)
Last election	20 seats, 47.1% (Note: New coalition formed in 2020. These numbers are the total seats and vote share of BERSATU, PAS and GERAKAN in the last election. The parties were previously part of Pakatan Harapan, Gagasan Sejahtera and Barisan Nasional.)	16 seats, 52.80% (Note: Cooperation between PH and BN with 16 seats)
Seats before	21	12
Seats won	33	3
Seat change	▲12	▼9
Popular vote	801,380	349,994
Percentage	68.93%	30.11%
Swing	▲21.83%	▼22.69%
Menteri Besar of Kedah before election
Muhammad Sanusi Md Nor
PN (PAS)
Menteri Besar of Kedah after election
Muhammad Sanusi Md Nor
PN (PAS)

The 15th Kedah state election was held on 12 August 2023 to elect the State Assembly members of the 15th Kedah State Legislative Assembly, the legislature of the Malaysian state of Kedah.

Kedah is one of the states which did not dissolve simultaneously with Dewan Rakyat on 10 October 2022. It was decided by Perikatan Nasional on 13 October 2022.

The governing Perikatan Nasional (PN) coalition led by Parti Islam Se-Malaysia (PAS) won 33 of 36 seats in a landslide, achieving a supermajority in the legislature. The Barisan Nasional (BN) – Pakatan Harapan (PH) electoral pact won the remaining 3 seats, with PH capturing all 3 seats. For the first time in the state's history, BN did not have any representation in the state assembly, allowing PH to take BN's place as the state's main opposition.

== Constituencies ==
All 36 constituencies within Kedah, which constitute the Kedah State Legislative Assembly, were contested during the election.

Electoral map of Kedah, showing all 36 constituencies

Breakdown of 2022 Malaysian general election result by state constituency in 2022, where PH in Red, PN in Blue-green and BN in blue

== Composition before dissolution ==
Government		Opposition
PN		PH			PEJUANG	BN
21		10			2	2
15	6	5	3	2	2	2
PAS	BERSATU	PKR	AMANAH	DAP	PEJUANG	UMNO

== Timeline ==
The key dates are listed below.

Date	Event
13 October 2022	Perikatan Nasional decides not to dissolve the 14th Kedah State Legislative Assembly.
28 June 2023	Dissolution of the Kedah State Legislative Assembly.
5 July 2023	Issue of the Writ of Election
29 July 2023	Nomination Day
29 July–11 August 2023	Campaigning Period
8–11 August 2023	Early Polling Days For Postal, Overseas and Advance Voters
12 August 2023	Polling Day

== Retiring incumbent(s) ==
The following members of the 14th State Legislative Assembly retired.

No.	State Constituency	Departing MLA	Coalition (Party)	Date confirmed	First elected	Reason
N22	Gurun	Johari Abdul	PH (PKR)	18 December 2022	2018	Appointment as Speaker of Dewan Rakyat.
N28	Bakar Arang	Simon Ooi Tze Min	PH (PKR)	21 July 2023	2013	Dropped by party.
N35	Kulim	Yeo Keng Chuan	PH (PKR)	21 July 2023	2018	Dropped by party.
N14	Alor Mengkudu	Phahrolrazi Mohd Zawawi	PH (PKR)	21 July 2023	2008	Dropped by party.
N23	Belantek	Mohd Isa Shafie	PN (PAS)	15 June 2023	1999	Died in office.
N27	Pantai Merdeka	Ahmad Fadzli Hashim	PN (PAS)	27 July 2023	2018	Dropped by party.
N30	Bayu	Abd Nasir Idris	PN (PAS)	27 July 2023	2018	Not contesting state election (Senator).
N01	Ayer Hangat	Juhari Bulat	PN (BERSATU)	26 June 2023	2018	Not seeking re-election.
N21	Guar Chempedak	Ku Abdul Rahman Ku Ismail	PN (BERSATU)	26 June 2023	2008	Not contesting state election (MP for Kubang Pasu).
N34	Lunas	Azman Nasrudin	PN (BERSATU)	26 June 2023	2013	Not contesting state election (MP for Padang Serai).
N02	Kuah	Mohd Firdaus Ahmad	PN (BERSATU)	26 June 2023	2018	Dropped by party.
N29	Sidam	Robert Ling Kui Ee	PN (BERSATU)	26 June 2023	2013	Dropped by party.
N19	Sungai Tiang	Suraya Yaacob	BN (UMNO)	1 July 2023	2004	Not seeking re-election.
N36	Bandar Baharu	Norsabrina Mohd. Noor	BN (UMNO)	21 July 2023	2013	Dropped by party.
N06	Jitra	Mukhriz Mahathir	PEJUANG	22 July 2023	2013	Incumbent's party not contesting election.
N15	Anak Bukit	Amiruddin Hamzah	PEJUANG	22 July 2023	2002	Incumbent's party not contesting election.

== Electoral candidates ==
No.	Parliamentary Constituency	No.	State Constituency	Voters	Incumbent State Assemblymen	Coalition (Party)	Political coalitions and parties									
No.	Parliamentary Constituency	No.	State Constituency	Voters	Incumbent State Assemblymen	Coalition (Party)	Barisan Nasional + Pakatan Harapan		Perikatan Nasional		Other parties/Independent candidates					
No.	Parliamentary Constituency	No.	State Constituency	Voters	Incumbent State Assemblymen	Coalition (Party)	Candidate name	Party	Candidate name	Party	Candidate name	Party	Candidate name	Party	Candidate name	Party
P004	Langkawi	N01	Ayer Hangat	33,156	Juhari Bulat	PN (BERSATU)	Hisham Suhaily Othman	UMNO	Shamsilah Siru	BERSATU	Safwan Hanif	IND	Zulfadli Mohd Yusoff	IND		
P004	Langkawi	N02	Kuah	34,694	Mohd Firdaus Ahmad	PN (BERSATU)	Mohd Fauzi Chik	PKR	Ahmad Pared Mahmud	BERSATU	Mazlan Ahmad	IND				
P005	Jerlun	N03	Kota Siputeh	29,777	Salmee Said	PH (AMANAH)	Salmee Said	AMANAH	Mohd Ashraf Mustaqim Badrul Munir	BERSATU	Abdul Ramli Latif	IND				
P005	Jerlun	N04	Ayer Hitam	37,819	Azhar Ibrahim	PN (PAS)	Hayazi Azizan	UMNO	Azhar Ibrahim	PAS						
P006	Kubang Pasu	N05	Bukit Kayu Hitam	46,054	Halimaton Shaadiah Saad	PN (BERSATU)	Zainol Abidin Mohamad	UMNO	Halimaton Shaadiah Saad	BERSATU						
P006	Kubang Pasu	N06	Jitra	63,059	Mukhriz Mahathir	PEJUANG	Sabrina Ahmad	PKR	Haim Hilman Abdullah	PAS						
P007	Padang Terap	N07	Kuala Nerang	31,481	Munir @ Mohamad Yusoff Zakaria	PN (PAS)	Rizwan Abu Bakar	AMANAH	Munir @ Mohamad Yusoff Zakaria	PAS						
P007	Padang Terap	N08	Pedu	28,606	Mohd Radzi Md Amin	PN (PAS)	Mahdzir Khalid	UMNO	Mohd Radzi Md Amin	PAS						
P008	Pokok Sena	N09	Bukit Lada	40,729	Salim Mahmood	PN (PAS)	Syed Ali Syed Rastan	UMNO	Salim Mahmood	PAS						
P008	Pokok Sena	N10	Bukit Pinang	36,791	Wan Romani Wan Salim	PN (PAS)	Hazir Mat Zain	PKR	Wan Romani Wan Salim	PAS						
P008	Pokok Sena	N11	Derga	37,738	Tan Kok Yew	PH (DAP)	Tan Kok Yew	DAP	Muhammad Amri Wahab	BERSATU	Noor Azman Basharon	IND				
P009	Alor Setar	N12	Suka Menanti	41,957	Zamri Yusuf	PH (PKR)	Zamri Yusuf	PKR	Dzowahir Ab Ghani	BERSATU						
P009	Alor Setar	N13	Kota Darul Aman	25,829	Teh Swee Leong	PH (DAP)	Teh Swee Leong	DAP	Chuah See Seng	GERAKAN						
P009	Alor Setar	N14	Alor Mengkudu	38,193	Phahrolrazi Mohd Zawawi	PH (PKR)	Mahfuz Omar	AMANAH	Muhamad Radhi Mat Din	PAS						
P010	Kuala Kedah	N15	Anak Bukit	36,491	Amiruddin Hamzah	PEJUANG	Nor Hasita Md. Isa	UMNO	Rashidi Abdul Razak	PAS						
P010	Kuala Kedah	N16	Kubang Rotan	50,233	Mohd Asmirul Anuar Aris	PH (AMANAH)	Mohd Asmirul Anuar Aris	AMANAH	Mohd Salleh Saidin	BERSATU						
P010	Kuala Kedah	N17	Pengkalan Kundor	46,235	Ismail Salleh	PH (AMANAH)	Ismail Salleh	AMANAH	Mardhiyyah Johari	PAS						
P011	Pendang	N18	Tokai	45,374	Mohd Hayati Othman	PN (PAS)	Zainal Abidin Saad	AMANAH	Mohd Hayati Othman	PAS						
P011	Pendang	N19	Sungai Tiang	49,414	Suraya Yaacob	BN (UMNO)	Mohamad Fadzil Zolkipli	UMNO	Abdul Razak Khamis	BERSATU						
P012	Jerai	N20	Sungai Limau	34,283	Mohd Azam Abd Samat	PN (PAS)	Siti Balkhis Husain	AMANAH	Mohd Azam Abd Samat	PAS						
P012	Jerai	N21	Guar Chempedak	30,085	Ku Abdul Rahman Ku Ismail	PN (BERSATU)	Abdul Paris Abdul Hamid	UMNO	Abdul Ghafar Saad	BERSATU	Ku Abdul Halim Ku Ismail	IND				
P012	Jerai	N22	Gurun	40,941	Vacant (Note: Johari Abdul contested and won the seat in the 2018 Kedah state election as a Pakatan Harapan (PKR) candidate, and announced he resigned his state seat on 18 December 2022. He was also the Opposition Leader from 31 October 2022 to his resignation date.)		Mohammed Firdaus Johari	PKR	Baddrol Bakhtiar	PAS						
P013	Sik	N23	Belantek	28,165	Vacant		Mazli Saipi	AMANAH	Ahmad Sulaiman	PAS						
P013	Sik	N24	Jeneri	35,097	Muhammad Sanusi Md Nor	PN (PAS)	Muhamad Khizri Abu Kassim	UMNO	Muhammad Sanusi Md Nor	PAS						
P014	Merbok	N25	Bukit Selambau	79,518	Summugam Rengasamy	PH (PKR)	Summugam Rengasamy	PKR	Azizan Hamzah	PAS	Dinesh Muniandy	IND				
P014	Merbok	N26	Tanjong Dawai	54,629	Hanif Ghazali	PN (PAS)	Shaiful Hazizy Zainol Abidin	UMNO	Hanif Ghazali	PAS						
P015	Sungai Petani	N27	Pantai Merdeka	51,502	Ahmad Fadzli Hashim	PN (PAS)	Wan Mohalina Wan Mohamad	UMNO	Shahrir Long	PAS						
P015	Sungai Petani	N28	Bakar Arang	57,867	Simon Ooi Tze Min	PH (PKR)	Adam Loh Wee Chai	PKR	Tai Kuang Tee	GERAKAN	Tan Kee Chye	PRM				
P015	Sungai Petani	N29	Sidam	60,983	Robert Ling Kui Ee	PN (BERSATU)	Bau Wong Bau Ek	PKR	Juliana Abdul Ghani	BERSATU						
P016	Baling	N30	Bayu	47,613	Abd Nasir Idris	PN (PAS)	Ishak Mat	UMNO	Mohd Taufik Yaacob	BERSATU						
P016	Baling	N31	Kupang	42,720	Najmi Ahmad	PN (PAS)	Muhammad Suhaimi Hamzah	AMANAH	Najmi Ahmad	PAS						
P016	Baling	N32	Kuala Ketil	42,184	Mansor Zakaria	PN (PAS)	Suriati Che Mid	UMNO	Mansor Zakaria	PAS						
P017	Padang Serai	N33	Merbau Pulas	53,323	Siti Ashah Ghazali	PN (PAS)	Asmadi Abu Talib	UMNO	Siti Ashah Ghazali	PAS						
P017	Padang Serai	N34	Lunas	82,212	Azman Nasrudin	PN (BERSATU)	Shamsul Anuar Abdullah	PKR	Khairul Anuar Ramli	BERSATU	Rajendaran Nadarajan	IND	Pannir Selvam S Suppiah	IND	Arichindarem Sinappayen	IND
P018	Kulim-Bandar Baharu	N35	Kulim	54,169	Yeo Keng Chuan	PH (PKR)	Teh Lean Ong	PKR	Wong Chia Zhen	GERAKAN						
P018	Kulim-Bandar Baharu	N36	Bandar Baharu	36,164	Norsabrina Mohd. Noor	BN (UMNO)	Nuraini Yusoff	UMNO	Mohd Suffian Yusoff	PAS						

== Opinion polls ==
Polling firm	Dates conducted	Sample size	PH+BN	PN	Oth	Lead	Ref
Ilham Centre	29 July – 8 August 2023	2,304	24%	69%	7%	PN +45%	

== Results ==
Results of the 2023 Kedah state election by party

Party or alliance		Votes	%	Seats	+/–
Perikatan Nasional	Malaysian Islamic Party	525,909	45.24	21	+6
Perikatan Nasional	Malaysian United Indigenous Party	228,459	19.65	11	+6
Perikatan Nasional	Parti Gerakan Rakyat Malaysia	47,012	4.04	1	+1
Perikatan Nasional	Total	801,380	68.93	33	+13
Pakatan Harapan + Barisan Nasional	People's Justice Party	150,863	12.98	2	–5
Pakatan Harapan + Barisan Nasional	United Malays National Organisation	116,340	10.01	0	–3
Pakatan Harapan + Barisan Nasional	National Trust Party	60,842	5.23	0	–4
Pakatan Harapan + Barisan Nasional	Democratic Action Party	21,949	1.89	1	–1
Pakatan Harapan + Barisan Nasional	Total	349,994	30.11	3	–13
Parti Rakyat Malaysia		138	0.01	0	New
Independents		11,057	0.95	0	0
Total		1,162,569	100.00	36	–

=== By parliamentary constituency ===
PN won all parliamentary constituency by average percentages.

No.	Constituency	Pakatan Harapan + Barisan Nasional	Perikatan Nasional	Member of Parliament
P004	Langkawi	23.37%	55.46%	Mohd Suhaimi Abdullah
P005	Jerlun	20.49%	78.89%	Abdul Ghani Ahmad
P006	Kubang Pasu	25.62%	74.38%	Ku Abdul Rahman Ku Ismail
P007	Padang Terap	26.44%	73.56%	Nurul Amin Hamid
P008	Pokok Sena	26.51%	73.21%	Ahmad Saad Yahaya
P009	Alor Setar	41.30%	58.70%	Afnan Hamimi Taib Azamudden
P010	Kuala Kedah	30.48%	69.52%	Ahmad Fakruddin Fakhrurazi
P011	Pendang	21.48%	78.52%	Awang Solahuddin Hashim
P012	Jerai	25.99%	73.79%	Sabri Azit
P013	Sik	19.18%	80.82%	Ahmad Tarmizi Sulaiman
P014	Merbok	32.30%	67.31%	Mohd Nazri Abu Hassan
P015	Sungai Petani	42.24%	57.64%	Mohammed Taufiq Johari
P016	Baling	24.22%	75.78%	Hassan Saad
P017	Padang Serai	34.52%	64.79%	Azman Nasrudin
P018	Kulim-Bandar Baharu	35.34%	64.66%	Roslan Hashim

=== Seats that changed allegiance ===
No.	Seat	Previous Party (2018)	Current Party (2023)
N01	Ayer Hangat	Pakatan Harapan (BERSATU)	Perikatan Nasional (BERSATU)
N02	Kuah	Pakatan Harapan (BERSATU)	Perikatan Nasional (BERSATU)
N03	Kota Siputeh	Pakatan Harapan (AMANAH)	Perikatan Nasional (BERSATU)
N05	Bukit Kayu Hitam	Pakatan Harapan (BERSATU)	Perikatan Nasional (BERSATU)
N06	Jitra	Pakatan Harapan (BERSATU)	Perikatan Nasional (PAS)
N11	Derga	Pakatan Harapan (DAP)	Perikatan Nasional (BERSATU)
N12	Suka Menanti	Pakatan Harapan (PKR)	Perikatan Nasional (BERSATU)
N14	Alor Mengkudu	Pakatan Harapan (AMANAH)	Perikatan Nasional (PAS)
N15	Anak Bukit	Pakatan Harapan (BERSATU)	Perikatan Nasional (PAS)
N16	Kubang Rotan	Pakatan Harapan (AMANAH)	Perikatan Nasional (BERSATU)
N17	Pengkalan Kundor	Pakatan Harapan (AMANAH)	Perikatan Nasional (PAS)
N19	Sungai Tiang	Barisan Nasional (UMNO)	Perikatan Nasional (BERSATU)
N21	Guar Chempedak	Barisan Nasional (UMNO)	Perikatan Nasional (BERSATU)
N22	Gurun	Pakatan Harapan (PKR)	Perikatan Nasional (PAS)
N25	Bukit Selambau	Pakatan Harapan (PKR)	Perikatan Nasional (PAS)
N30	Bayu	PAS	Perikatan Nasional (BERSATU)
N34	Lunas	Pakatan Harapan (PKR)	Perikatan Nasional (BERSATU)
N35	Kulim	Pakatan Harapan (PKR)	Perikatan Nasional (GERAKAN)
N36	Bandar Baharu	Barisan Nasional (UMNO)	Perikatan Nasional (PAS)

== Aftermath ==
Mohd Sanusi were sworn in as Menteri Besar for his second term in front of Sultan of Kedah on 14 August 2023. Ten EXCO members were sworn in on 21 August.

MLA for Sidam, Bau Wong Bau Ek from PH-PKR were appointed as Opposition Leader on 26 November.
