= Ahmad Yahaya =

Malaysian politician

Yang Berhormat Dato' Ustaz Ahmad Saad Yahaya DSDK BKM MP
- أحمد سعد يحيى

Member of the Malaysian Parliament for Pokok Sena
- Incumbent
- Assumed office 19 December 2022
- Preceded by: Mahfuz Omar (PH–AMANAH)
- Majority: 31,751 (2022)

Senator Elected by the Kedah State Legislative Assembly
- In office 2 September 2020 – 5 November 2022 Serving with Othman Aziz
- Monarch: Abdullah
- Prime Minister: Muhyiddin Yassin (2020–2021); Ismail Sabri Yaakob (2021–2022)
- Preceded by: Mohd Suhaimi Abdullah & Ananthan Somasundaram
- Succeeded by: Abdul Nasir Idris & Musoddak Ahmad

Head of Dewan Ulamak of the Malaysian Islamic Party
- Incumbent
- Assumed office 2021
- President: Abdul Hadi Awang
- Deputy: Zulkifli Ismail
- Preceded by: Nik Muhammad Zawawi Salleh

State Commissioner of the Malaysian Islamic Party of Kedah
- Incumbent
- Assumed office 8 July 2019
- President: Abdul Hadi Awang
- Deputy: Muhammad Sanusi Md Nor (Deputy Commissioner I); Ahmad Fakhruddin Fakhrurazi (Deputy Commissioner II); Muhammad Suffian Yusoff (Deputy Commissioner III)
- Preceded by: Ahmad Fakhruddin Fakhrurazi

Member of the Kedah State Legislative Assembly for Alor Mengkudu
- In office 5 May 2013 – 9 May 2018
- Preceded by: Ismail Salleh (PR–PAS)
- Succeeded by: Phahrolrazi Mohd Zawawi (PH–AMANAH)
- Majority: 1,865 (2013)

Personal details
- Born: Ahmad bin Saad @ Yahaya (1975) Jitra, Kedah, Malaysia
- Party: Malaysian Islamic Party (PAS)
- Other political affiliations: Pakatan Rakyat (PR) (2008–2015); Gagasan Sejahtera (GS) (2016–2020); Perikatan Nasional (PN) (since 2020)
- Education: Universitas Islam Riau
- Occupation: Politician

Ahmad bin Saad @ Yahaya or commonly known as Ahmad Yahaya is a Malaysian politician who has served as the Member of Parliament (MP) for Pokok Sena since November 2022. He had served as Member of the Kedah State Legislative Assembly (MLA) for Alor Mengkudu from May 2013 to May 2018. He is a member of the Malaysian Islamic Party (PAS), a component party of the Perikatan Nasional (PN) and formerly Gagasan Sejahtera (GS) and Pakatan Rakyat (PR) coalitions. He has served as the Head of the Dewan Ulamak of PAS since 2021 and State Commissioner of PAS of Kedah since 2019.

== Election results ==
Kedah State Legislative Assembly
Year	Constituency	Candidate	Votes	Pct	Opponent(s)	Votes	Pct	Ballots cast	Majority	Turnout
2013	N14 Alor Mengkudu	Ahmad Saad Yahaya (PAS)	11,453	53.60%	Sharifah Maznah Syed Kassim Barakbah (UMNO)	9,588	44.88%	21,366	1,865	85.34%
2013	N14 Alor Mengkudu	Ahmad Saad Yahaya (PAS)	11,453	53.60%	Fadzil Hanafi (IND)	325	1.52%	21,366	1,865	85.34%
2018	N14 Alor Mengkudu	Ahmad Saad Yahaya (PAS)	6,964	31.32%	Phahrolrazi Mohd Zawawi (AMANAH)	8,840	39.75%	22,238	1,876	81.96%
2018	N14 Alor Mengkudu	Ahmad Saad Yahaya (PAS)	6,964	31.32%	Abdul Malik Saat (UMNO)	6,434	28.93%	22,238	1,876	81.96%

Parliament of Malaysia
Year	Constituency	Candidate	Votes	Pct	Opponent(s)	Votes	Pct	Ballots cast	Majority	Turnout
2022	P008 Pokok Sena	Ahmad Saad Yahaya (PAS)	52,275	59.44%	Mahfuz Omar (AMANAH)	20,524	23.34%	88,976	31,751	76.58%
2022	P008 Pokok Sena	Ahmad Saad Yahaya (PAS)	52,275	59.44%	Noran Zamini Jamaluddin (UMNO)	14,523	16.51%	88,976	31,751	76.58%
2022	P008 Pokok Sena	Ahmad Saad Yahaya (PAS)	52,275	59.44%	Noraini Md Salleh (WARISAN)	622	0.71%	88,976	31,751	76.58%

== Honours ==
=== Honours of Malaysia ===
- Malaysia
  - Recipient of the 17th Yang di-Pertuan Agong Installation Medal (2024)
- Kedah
  - Knight Companion of the Order of Loyalty to the Royal House of Kedah (DSDK) – Dato' (2021)
  - Recipient of the Public Service Star (BKM) (2009)

== See also ==
- Members of the Dewan Negara, 14th Malaysian Parliament
- List of people who have served in both Houses of the Malaysian Parliament
