= Salim Mahmood =

Malaysian politician

Yang Berhormat Ustaz Salim Mahmood MLA
- سليم محمود الحافظ

Member of the Kedah State Legislative Assembly for Bukit Lada
- Incumbent
- Assumed office 9 May 2018
- Preceded by: Ahmad Sudin (BN–UMNO)
- Majority: 1,285 (2018); 17,411 (2023)

Personal details
- Born: Kampung Paya, Pokok Sena, Kedah
- Party: Malaysian Islamic Party (PAS)
- Other political affiliations: Perikatan Nasional (PN)
- Spouse: Fauziah Muhd Hussin
- Children: 4
- Occupation: Politician

Salim bin Mahmood Al-Hafiz is a Malaysian politician who served as Member of the Kedah State Legislative Assembly (MLA) for Pedu since May 2018. He is a member of Malaysian Islamic Party (PAS), a component party of Perikatan Nasional (PN) coalitions.

== Election results ==
Kedah State Legislative Assembly
Year	Constituency	Candidate	Votes	Pct	Opponent(s)	Votes	Pct	Ballots cast	Majority	Turnout
2018	N09 Bukit Lada	Salim Mahmood Al-Hafiz (PAS)	9,573	38.85%	Ariffin Man (UNMO)	8,288	33.63%	25,165	1,285	83.90%
2018	N09 Bukit Lada	Salim Mahmood Al-Hafiz (PAS)	9,573	38.85%	Mohd Aizad Roslan (BERSATU)	6,337	25.72%	25,165	1,285	83.90%
2018	N09 Bukit Lada	Salim Mahmood Al-Hafiz (PAS)	9,573	38.85%	Mohd Ismail Othman (IND)	444	1.80%	25,165	1,285	83.90%
2023	N09 Bukit Lada	Salim Mahmood Al-Hafiz (PAS)	24,183	78.12%	Syed Ali Syed Rastan (UNMO)	6,772	21.88%	31,184	17,411	76.56%
