= Phahrolrazi Mohd Zawawi =

Malaysian politician

Yang Berbahagia Dato' Phahrolrazi Mohd Zawawi DSDK JP
- فخرالرازي محمد زواوي
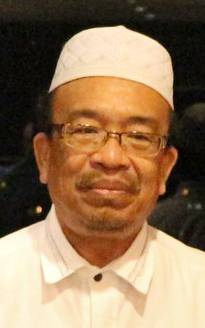

State Leader of the Opposition of Kedah
- In office 20 July 2020 – 31 October 2022
- Monarch: Sallehuddin
- Menteri Besar: Muhammad Sanusi Md Nor
- Preceded by: Muhammad Sanusi Md Nor
- Succeeded by: Johari Abdul
- Constituency: Alor Mengkudu

Member of the Kedah State Executive Council (Rural Development, Entrepreneur and Public Works)
- In office 3 March 2009 – 28 February 2012
- Monarch: Abdul Halim
- Menteri Besar: Azizan Abdul Razak
- Constituency: Pengkalan Kundor

Member of the Kedah State Legislative Assembly for Alor Mengkudu
- In office 9 May 2018 – 12 August 2023
- Preceded by: Ahmad Yahaya (PAS)
- Succeeded by: Muhamad Radhi Mat Din (PN–PAS)
- Majority: 1,876 (2018)

Member of the Kedah State Legislative Assembly for Pengkalan Kundor
- In office 8 March 2008 – 9 May 2018
- Preceded by: Mohd Jamil Md Idross (BN–UMNO)
- Succeeded by: Ismail Salleh (PH–AMANAH)
- Majority: 3,122 (2008); 3,884 (2013)
- In office 29 November 1999 – 21 March 2004
- Preceded by: Mohd Jamil Md Idross (BN–UMNO)
- Succeeded by: Mohd Jamil Md Idross (BN–UMNO)
- Majority: 697 (1999)

State Chairman of the National Trust Party of Kedah
- In office 14 November 2019 – 30 October 2022
- President: Mohamad Sabu
- Deputy: Ismail Salleh
- Vice Chairman: Mohd Taib Ahmad (Vice Chairman I); Fauzi Tahir (Vice Chairman II)
- Preceded by: Ismail Salleh
- Succeeded by: Ismail Salleh (acting)

Personal details
- Born: Phahrolrazi bin Mohd Zawawi; 8 September 1953 (age 72) Kedah, Federation of Malaya (now Malaysia)
- Citizenship: Malaysian
- Party: Malaysian Islamic Party (PAS) (–2015); National Trust Party (AMANAH) (2015–2022); Independent (2022–2023); People's Justice Party (PKR) (since 2023)
- Other political affiliations: Pakatan Rakyat (PR) (–2015); Pakatan Harapan (PH) (2015–2022, since 2023)
- Occupation: Politician

Phahrolrazi bin Mohd Zawawi (born 8 September 1953) is a Malaysian politician who served as Member of the Kedah State Legislative Assembly (MLA) for Alor Mengkudu from May 2018 to August 2023 and for Pengkalan Kundor from March 2008 to May 2018 as well as from December 1999 to March 2004, Leader of the Opposition of Kedah from July 2020 to October 2022 and Member of the Kedah State Executive Council (EXCO) in the Pakatan Rakyat (PR) state administration under former Menteri Besar Azizan Abdul Razak from March 2009 to February 2012. He is a member of the People's Justice Party (PKR), a component party of the Pakatan Harapan (PH) coalition and was an independent, a member of the National Trust Party (AMANAH), also a component party of the PH coalition and a member of the Malaysian Islamic Party (PAS), a former component party of the PR coalition. He also served as State Chairman of AMANAH of Kedah from November 2019 to his removal from the party in October 2022. He was also the State Deputy Chairman of AMANAH of Kedah and State Deputy Commissioner of PAS of Kedah.

== Education ==
He holds a Bachelor's degree (Hons) from Universiti Teknologi Malaysia (UTM).

== Career ==
Among his experiences after obtaining a degree from UTM are Public Works Department (JKR) Engineers, housing developers, construction contractors and consulting engineers.

== Political career ==
=== Member of the Kedah State Legislative Assembly for Pengkalan Kundor (1999–2004 & 2008–2018) ===
In the 1999 Kedah state election, he was nominated by his party PAS to contest for the Pengkalan Kundor against BN candidate Abdul Ghani Jamaludin, Chairperson of UMNO Kuala Kedah branch and went on to defeat him to be elected as the new Pengkalan Kundor MLA for his first term with a majority of 697 votes.

In the 2004 Kedah state election, he was renominated by PAS to seek for reelection as Pengkalan Kundor MLA. However this time, he was defeated by another candidate from BN and UMNO Mohd Jamil Md Idross who was also the Pengkalan Kundor MLA with a minority of 3,429 votes.

In the 2008 Kedah state election, he was renominated once again by PAS to regain the Pengkalan Kundor state seat and he went on to defeat the BN and UMNO candidate again and reelected as the Pengkalan Kundor for his second term.

In the 2013 Kedah state election, he was renominated twice again by his party PAS to defend his Pengkalan Kundor state seat and proceeded to defeat opponents and win again for his third term.

=== Member of the Kedah State Executive Council (2009–2012) ===
After winning the 2008 general election, he was appointed chairman of the Rural Development, Entrepreneurship and Careers Committee. [1] [2] He was later appointed chairman of the Housing and Local Government, Works, Water Supply, Water Resources and Energy Committee. On 12 April 2008, he was appointed a Member of the Kedah State Development Corporation (PKNK). [3]

==== Relations with former Menteri Besar Azizan Abdul Razak ====
Two of the PAS exco members - Phahrolrazi Mohd Nawawi (Pengkalan Kundor Assemblyman) and Dr Ismail Salleh (Alor Mengkudu Assemblyman) reportedly did not want to be re -appointed to the post "due to lack of confidence in Azizan's leadership." On Tuesday 28 February 2012, Azizan tried to "get a mandate from the party's top leadership to avoid a political crisis." Eight of the 10 Kedah exco members took the oath of office in front of the Chairman of the Kedah Sultan's Regents, Datuk Seri Tunku Annuar Sultan Badlishah. Two other exco members, Phahrolrazi and Datuk Dr Ismail Salleh, are said to have refused to continue their posts.

Mahfuz Omar (Pas Pokok Sena) rejected the notion that Azizan's firmness in the Universities and University Colleges Act (AUKU) towards Kolej Universiti Insaniah (KUIN) students was the cause of problems in the state. Malaysian Student Solidarity (SMM) president Ahmad Syukri Ab Razab stated that several student organizations had warned that they would hold a protest in front of Wisma Darul Aman on 19 February 2012.

Azizan is considered an old leader (72 years old) who is stubborn and difficult to discipline. PAS secretary-general Datuk Mustafa Ali directed his vice -president, Salahuddin Ayub, to Kedah as a mediator to help resolve the crisis.

Utusan Malaysia and UMNO tried to fight them but Phahrolrazi denied creating a movement against the Menteri Besar.

Pharolrazi is a leading figure in the moderate 'Erdogan' faction of PAS, named after the Turkish Prime Minister and President Recep Tayyip Erdogan. During PAS's term in state government from 2008 to 2013, he emerged as a leadership rival to the Menteri Besar (Chief Minister) Azizan Abdul Razak, of the party's conservative ulama faction. The breakdown in the relationship between Pharolrazi and Azizan led to Pharolrazi to refuse reappointment as a member of the Executive Council in 2012, before rejoining the council after a brief period. In 2014 he formed PasMa, a splinter movement of the national party formed by members of the Erdogan faction concerned that the party's conservative leadership might cause a breakdown in the Pakatan Rakyat coalition between PAS, Anwar Ibrahim's People's Justice Party and the Democratic Action Party.

=== Member of the Kedah State Legislative Assembly for Alor Mengkudu (2018–2023) ===
In the 2018 Kedah state election, he contested for a different seat and in a different ticket. He was nominated by his new party AMANAH which is part of PH to contest for Alor Mengkudu state seat. He managed to claim victory again and be elected as the new Alor Mengkudu MLA for his term. PH also defeated BN in the election and formed the new administration led by Kedah PH and BERSATU Chairman as well as new Menteri Besar Mukhriz Mahathir replacing the BN administration under Ahmad Bashah Md Hanipah. However, given that he is the PH and government MLA, he was not reappointed as an EXCO member by Mukhriz.

In the 2023 Kedah state election, he was not nominated by his new party PKR to contest in the elections and defend the Alor Mengkudu state seat. Instead, PH was contested by former Pokok Sena MP, Mahfuz Omar from AMANAH, another component party of Pakatan Harapan and won by Muhamad Radhi Mat Din of Perikatan Nasional (PN) in the election.

=== State Chairman of the National Trust Party of Kedah (2019–2022) ===
On 14 November 2019 during the Kedah AMANAH Convention, he was promoted as the new State Chairman of AMANAH of Kedah replacing Ismail Salleh who in turn became his deputy. On 30 October 2022, he was sacked from AMANAH for going against the party interests, disobeying the party decisions and violating the party constitution. With this, State Deputy Chairman Ismail Salleh would take over him as the Acting State Chairman and carry out the tasks and duties of the position. In response, President of AMANAH Mohamad Sabu explained that the party had taken the decision as the actions of Phahrolrazi had potential to aggravate the situation as PH prepared for the 2022 general election (GE15) and expressed hope that Phahrolrazi could improve in future and be taken back to the party, he also stressed that it was normal to remove members with bad discipline from the party and the appeal process for the decision could proceed as well as highlighting the role of Phahrolrazi as the pioneer of the party and hard work he had done for the party. Communications Director of AMANAH Khalid Abdul Samad replied that difference of opinions was allowed in the party but inciting others not to work for election and resulting in splits and divisions within the party were not. His removal from the party was believed to be linked with his insistent request for the Malay-majority Jerai federal seat, which was allocated to another component party of PH Democratic Action Party (DAP) under PH, to be returned to AMANAH. He said the issue had become a bone of contention between Kedah AMANAH, which he previously led as State Chairman, and the AMANAH central leadership, which Mohamad led as President, as it was not meant for DAP, which would be nominating its State Deputy Chairman of Kedah Zulhazmi Shariff for the seat. Phahrolrazi further pointed out that about 80% of the voters in Jerai were Malays and they could not “accept DAP” due to its "anti-Malay" and "anti-Islam" stereotypical images and it was a must to take into account the sentiments of voters. He added that the issue had been going on for almost a month. Phahrolrazi said the Kedah AMANAH had conveyed its firm stance to the central leadership, even to the extent of wanting to pull out of GE15 if the seat was given to DAP. While acknowledging that DAP was a good ally of AMANAH, he said Jerai should not be turned into a testing ground for Malay electoral acceptance of DAP. In another response to his removal from AMANAH, he admitted that he was shocked by the action but did not regret it or feel sad about it, adding that he would not be appealing against his removal from the party.

=== Leader of the Opposition of Kedah (2020–2022) ===
On 20 July 2020, he was appointed as the new State Leader of the Opposition of Kedah to take over Muhammad Sanusi Md Nor who was swept into power as the new Menteri Besar two months before on 17 May 2020 and after PH also returned to the opposition. On 31 October 2022 following his removal from AMANAH, the component party of PH opposition coalition, a day prior on 30 October 2022, he became an independent Kedah MLA, disqualifying him from holding the position, he was replaced with Johari Abdul, the Gurun MLA from another component party of PH, the PKR.

=== Member of the People's Justice Party (since 2023) ===
After his removal from AMANAH, Phahrolrazi responded on 1 December 2022 that he would rejoin PH by joining another component party of PH, he however did not immediately clarify on which party to join but it was widely believed to be PKR. He also unveiled that there were more than 200 AMANAH members that would leave the party and follow his suit. On 13 March 2023, Speaker of the Kedah State Legislative Assembly Juhari Bulat clarified it and confirmed that Phahrolrazi had joined PKR.

== Election results ==
Parliament of Malaysia
Year	Constituency	Candidate	Votes	Pct	Opponent(s)	Votes	Pct	Ballots cast	Majority	Turnout
1986	P009 Pendang	Phahrolrazi Mohd Zawawi (PAS)	15,986	48.63%	Othman Abdul (UMNO)	16,886	51.37%	33,452	900	77.92%

Kedah State Legislative Assembly
Year	Constituency	Candidate	Votes	Pct	Opponent(s)	Votes	Pct	Ballots cast	Majority	Turnout
1990	N12 Pengkalan Kundor	Phahrolrazi Mohd Zawawi (PAS)	7,362	46.43%	Syed Razak Syed Zain Barakbah (UMNO)	8,527	53.57%	16,254	1,165	74.63%
1999	N17 Pengkalan Kundor	Phahrolrazi Mohd Zawawi (PAS)	8,817	52.06%	Abdul Ghani Jamaludin (UMNO)	8,120	47.94%	17,228	697	76.85%
2004	N17 Pengkalan Kundor	Phahrolrazi Mohd Zawawi (PAS)	9,155	42.11%	Mohd Jamil Md Idross (UMNO)	12,584	57.89%	22,120	3,429	82.11%
2008	N17 Pengkalan Kundor	Phahrolrazi Mohd Zawawi (PAS)	12,575	57.09%	Mohd Jamil Md Idross (UMNO)	9,453	42.91%	22,285	3,122	79.30%
2013	N17 Pengkalan Kundor	Phahrolrazi Mohd Zawawi (PAS)	15,526	57.15%	Noor Hasita Mat Isa (UMNO)	11,642	42.85%	27,568	3,884	86.70%
2018	N14 Alor Mengkudu	Phahrolrazi Mohd Zawawi (AMANAH)	8,840	39.75%	Ahmad Saad @ Yahaya (PAS)	6,964	31.32%	22,681	1,876	83.60%
2018	N14 Alor Mengkudu	Phahrolrazi Mohd Zawawi (AMANAH)	8,840	39.75%	Abdul Malik Saat (UMNO)	6,434	28.93%	22,681	1,876	83.60%

== Honours ==
- Kedah
  - Knight Companion of the Order of Loyalty to the Royal House of Kedah (DSDK) – Dato' (2008)
  - Justice of the Peace (JP) (2012)
