= Shahlan Ismail =

Malaysian political secretary

Yang Berbahagia Dato' Shahlan Ismail DIMP AMN

Personal details
- Born: 25 February 1958 (age 68) Kedah, Federation of Malaya
- Citizenship: Malaysian
- Spouse: Noralaini Binti Ismail
- Children: 7
- Education: Universiti Malaya

Shahlan bin Ismail was the political secretary of Dato' Seri Najib Razak the former prime minister of Malaysia.

== Personal life ==
Shahlan was born in Kampung Sungai Durian, Pokok Sena, Kedah, Malaysia. He is married to Datin Dr. Noralaini Binti Ismail a dentist by profession. As of 2013 the couple have 7 children Khairul Aiman Nasution (34), Zatil Hanan (32), Muhammad Kasyful Azim (27), Syahidatul Qistina (25), Muhammad Syamil Faruqi (23), Alya Dalilah (20) and Anis Salsabila (17).

== Education ==
He received his primary education at Sekolah Kebangsaan Gajah Mati, Pokok Sena (Sekolah Kebangsaan Wan Abdul Samad), Sekolah Menengah Pokok Sena Kedah, Sekolah Menengah Sains Pengkalan Chepa Kelantan and Sekolah Alam Shah Kuala Lumpur.

He received his Ijazah Sarjana Muda Sastera Dengan Kepujian Dan Diploma Pendidikan from Universiti Malaya.

== Career ==
Education Officer in Sekolah Menengah Tunku Putra Baling, Kedah. After that he continue his service as an officer for the Biro Tata Negara (BTN) in the Prime Minister office, Special officer to the Minister of Education (1987–1995), Minister of Defence (1995–2000), Deputy Prime Minister (2004–2008) and currently serving the Prime Minister of Malaysia.

== Egyptian crisis ==
During the Arab Spring in Egypt, Shahlan Ismail was sent to Cairo to handle the situation that effected Malaysian there. He is also the coordinator for the evacuation of Malaysians in Cairo. He was responsible for arranging flight plans for Malaysians to save them from chaos that crippled Egyptian economy and government administration.

== 2010 big flood In Kedah ==
Shahlan Ismail was also in charged in helping the flood victims in Jitra, Kedah, Malaysia. There, he initiated the distribution of 10,000 stoves for people who were affected. The stoves were sponsored by Proton Holding Berhad, Bank Muamalat, Bank Rakyat, Perak state government and Bakti.

== Rice project for the Penan people ==
On 16 December 2010, three Catholic Priest discovered that the bridge that was connecting the Penan people to the main population was swept away by the strong current of the river. The Prime Minister Department led by Shahlan Ismail was dispatched to the scene. They carried with them 2,000 kg in 200 bags of rice for the victims.

== Election results ==
Parliament of Malaysia
Year	Constituency	Candidate	Votes	Pct	Opponent(s)	Votes	Pct	Ballots cast	Majority	Turnout
2013	P008 Pokok Sena, Kedah	Shahlan Ismail (UMNO)	32,263	47.13%	Mahfuz Omar (PAS)	36,198	52.87%	69,524	3,935	86.14%

== Honours ==
- Malaysia
  - Member of the Order of the Defender of the Realm (AMN) (2005)
- Pahang
  - Knight Companion of the Order of the Crown of Pahang (DIMP) – Dato' (2006)
