= Ahmad Sabri Ismail =

Malaysian footballer

Personal information
- Full name: Ahmad Sabri bin Ismail
- Date of birth: 11 May 1963 (age 63)
- Place of birth: Alor Setar, Kedah, Malaysia
- Position: Goalkeeper

Team information
- Current team: Kedah FA (Goalkeeper Coach)

Senior career*
Years	Team	Apps	(Gls)
1980–1997	Kedah FA	?	(0)
1998	Penang FA	?	(0)
1999–2000	Kedah FA	?	(0)

International career
1982–1989	Malaysia	?	(0)
- * Club domestic league appearances and goals

Ahmad Sabri Ismail (born 11 May 1963 in Alor Setar, Kedah) is a former Malaysian football goalkeeper who played most notably for Kedah FA and spent a year for Penang FA. He retired from the game in 2000. Ahmad Sabri now the goal keeping coach at Malaysia Super League side Kedah FA. He popularly known as Sobri by Malaysian football fans.

The peak of his career was during his period as Kedah and Malaysia goalkeeper in the late 1980s; during his time at Kedah in the early 1990s he won many medals including one Division 2 (1992) and Division 1 title (1993), two Malaysia Cups (1990, 1993) and one FA Cup (1996). In 1998, He won Liga Perdana 1 with Penang FA.

His combinations with Mohd Azraai Khor Abdullah (head coach) and Muhamad Radhi Mat Din (assistant coach) had earned Kedah with the double treble title.

Sabri appeared for Malaysia in a 1990 FIFA World Cup qualifying match against Singapore.
