= Pokok Sena (federal constituency) =

Federal constituency of Kedah, Malaysia

Pokok Sena (P008)
Kedah constituency

Federal constituency
- Legislature: Dewan Rakyat
- MP: Ahmad Saad @ Yahaya; PN
- Constituency created: 1994
- First contested: 1995
- Last contested: 2022

Demographics
- Population (2020): 133,057
- Electors (2023): 115,258
- Area (km²): 322
- Pop. density (per km²): 413.2

Pokok Sena is a federal constituency in Pokok Sena District and Kota Setar District, Kedah, Malaysia, that has been represented in the Dewan Rakyat since 1995.

The federal constituency was created in the 1994 redistribution and is mandated to return a single member to the Dewan Rakyat under the first past the post voting system.

== Demographics ==
https://live.chinapress.com.my/ge15/parliament/KEDAH

Ethnic breakdown of Pokok Sena's electorate as of 2022
1. Malay (81.8%)
2. Chinese (15.4%)
3. Indian (2.40%)
4. Other ethnicities (0.40%)

As of 2020, Pokok Sena has a population of 133,057 people.

Age breakdown of Pokok Sena's electorate as of 2022
1. 18-20 (5.71%)
2. 21-29 (21.3%)
3. 30-39 (23.1%)
4. 40-49 (16.9%)
5. 50-59 (13.7%)
6. 60-69 (11.1%)
7. 70-79 (5.94%)
8. 80-89 (2.03%)
9. above 90 (0.32%)
Gender breakdown of Pokok Sena's electorate as of 2022
1. Male (49.5%)
2. Female (50.5%)

== History ==
=== Polling districts ===
According to the federal gazette issued on 18 July 2023, the Pokok Sena constituency is divided into 52 polling districts.

State constituency	Polling Districts	Code	Location
Bukit Lada (N09)	Kedundong	008/09/01	SK Bukit Hijau
Bukit Lada (N09)	Derang	008/09/02	SK Bukit Hijau
Bukit Lada (N09)	Kampung Kejal	008/09/03	SK Bukit Tampoi
Bukit Lada (N09)	Gajah Mati	008/09/04	SK Bukit Pak Kiau
Bukit Lada (N09)	Bukit Larek	008/09/05	SM Sains Pokok Sena
Bukit Lada (N09)	Pekan Bharu Pokok Sena	008/09/06	SK Pokok Sena
Bukit Lada (N09)	Pekan Lama Pokok Sena	008/09/07	SK Wan Abdul Samad
Bukit Lada (N09)	Kampung Kolon	008/09/08	SMK Pokok Sena 2
Bukit Lada (N09)	Jabi	008/09/09	SK Jabi
Bukit Lada (N09)	Telaga Mas	008/09/10	SK Telaga Mas
Bukit Lada (N09)	Tanjong Musang	008/09/11	SMK Jabi
Bukit Lada (N09)	Kebun 500	008/09/12	SJK (C) Chung Hwa
Bukit Lada (N09)	Kepala Bendang	008/09/13	Masjid Kampung Kolam; Tabika Kemas Kampung Kolam
Bukit Lada (N09)	Kampung Menerong	008/09/14	SJK (C) Tong Yuh
Bukit Lada (N09)	Kampung Padang	008/09/15	SK Bukit Pak Kiau
Bukit Lada (N09)	Kampung Paya	008/09/16	SK Kg Paya
Bukit Lada (N09)	Kampung Nawa	008/09/17	SK Nawa
Bukit Lada (N09)	Bukit Payong	008/09/18	SK Bukit Payong
Bukit Lada (N09)	Kubang Leret	008/09/19	SK Kubang Leret
Bukit Lada (N09)	Kampung Bukit	008/09/20	SK Kampong Bukit
Bukit Lada (N09)	Kuala Lanjut	008/09/21	SK Kuala Lanjut
Bukit Lada (N09)	Kampung Panchor	008/09/22	SMK Pokok Sena
Bukit Pinang (N10)	Paya Lengkuas	008/10/01	SK Lengkuas
Bukit Pinang (N10)	Bukit Pinang	008/10/02	SJK (C) Soon Cheng
Bukit Pinang (N10)	Titi Baru	008/10/03	SMK Kepala Batas
Bukit Pinang (N10)	Kubang Lintah	008/10/04	SK Haji Abu Bakar
Bukit Pinang (N10)	Hutan Kampung	008/10/05	Kolej Tingkatan Enam Sultan Sallehuddin
Bukit Pinang (N10)	Taman Bayu	008/10/06	SMK Dato' Syed Omar
Bukit Pinang (N10)	Kampung Bohor	008/10/07	SK Bohor
Bukit Pinang (N10)	Lepai	008/10/08	SK Haji Abu Bakar
Bukit Pinang (N10)	Kampung Sungai Mati	008/10/09	Maktab Mahmud Pokok Sena
Bukit Pinang (N10)	Limbong	008/10/10	SK Taman Awana
Bukit Pinang (N10)	Kampung Alor Setol	008/10/11	SJK (C) Tai Chong
Bukit Pinang (N10)	Pondok Langgar	008/10/12	SK Langgar
Bukit Pinang (N10)	Kampung Langgar B	008/10/13	SMK Langgar
Bukit Pinang (N10)	Telok Jamat	008/10/14	SK Teluk Jamat
Bukit Pinang (N10)	Alor Senibong	008/10/15	Pertubuhan Peladang Kawasan Gerak Maju B-III Km 14
Bukit Pinang (N10)	Tualang	008/10/16	SK Tualang
Derga (N11)	Taman Pknk	008/11/01	SK Taman Rakyat
Derga (N11)	Alor Malai	008/11/02	MADA Rice Training Centre (MRTC)
Derga (N11)	Kampung Telok Sena	008/11/03	Kolej Vokasional Alor Setar
Derga (N11)	Jalan Stadium	008/11/04	SK Tunku Abdul Halim
Derga (N11)	Sentosa	008/11/05	SMK Sultanah Asma
Derga (N11)	Jalan Ambar	008/11/06	SMK Sultanah Asma
Derga (N11)	Derga	008/11/07	SK Tunku Raudzah
Derga (N11)	Jalan Sheriff	008/11/08	SJK (C) Kee Chee
Derga (N11)	Alor Segamat	008/11/09	SMK Sultanah Asma
Derga (N11)	Taman Mewah	008/11/10	SMK Tunku Sofiah
Derga (N11)	Taman Nuri	008/11/11	SK Convent
Derga (N11)	Taman Intan	008/11/12	SK Jalan Datuk Kumbar
Derga (N11)	Tanjung Seri	008/11/13	SK Alor Setar
Derga (N11)	Taman Derga Jaya	008/11/14	SR Islam Alor Setar

=== Representation history ===
Members of Parliament for Pokok Sena
Parliament	No	Years	Member	Party	Vote Share
Constituency created from Kota Setar and Padang Terap
9th	P008	1995–1999	Wan Hanafiah Wan Mat Saman (وان حنفيه وان مت ثمن)	BN (UMNO)	25,285; 55.02%
10th	P008	1999–2004	Mahfuz Omar (محفوظ عمر)	BA (PAS)	27,466; 53.55%
11th	P008	2004–2008	Abdul Rahman Ibrahim (عبدالرحمٰن إبراهيم)	BN (UMNO)	29,740; 57.00%
12th	P008	2008–2013	Mahfuz Omar (محفوظ عمر)	PR (PAS)	29,687; 55.34%
13th	P008	2013–2015	Mahfuz Omar (محفوظ عمر)	PR (PAS)	36,198; 52.87%
13th	P008	2015–2016	Mahfuz Omar (محفوظ عمر)	PAS	36,198; 52.87%
13th	P008	2016–2017	Mahfuz Omar (محفوظ عمر)	GS (PAS)	36,198; 52.87%
13th	P008	2018	Mahfuz Omar (محفوظ عمر)	Independent	36,198; 52.87%
13th	P008	2018	Mahfuz Omar (محفوظ عمر)	AMANAH	36,198; 52.87%
14th	P008	2018–2022	Mahfuz Omar (محفوظ عمر)	PH (AMANAH)	28,959; 40.93%
15th	P008	2022–present	Ahmad Saad @ Yahaya (أحمد سعاد @ يحيى)	PN (PAS)	52,275; 59.44%

=== State constituency ===
Parliamentary constituency	State constituency						
Parliamentary constituency	1955–1959*	1959–1974	1974–1986	1986–1995	1995–2004	2004–2018	2018–present
Pokok Sena					Bukit Lada		
Pokok Sena						Bukit Pinang	
Pokok Sena						Derga	
Pokok Sena					Langgar		
Pokok Sena					Tanjong Seri		

=== Historical boundaries ===
State Constituency	Area		
State Constituency	1994	2004	2018
Bukit Lada	Jabi; Kampung Leret; Kedundong; Kubang Leret; Pokok Sena	Bukit Lada; Jabi; Kedundong; Kubang Leret; Pokok Sena	
Bukit Pinang		Bukit Pinang; Bohor; Hutan Kampung; Langgar; Tualang	
Derga		Alor Malai; Derga; Kampung Alor Malong; Kampung Hujung Ambar; Kampung Melayu	
Langgar	Bukit Pinang; Kampung Alor Ganu; Kampung Kubang Lintah; Kampung Padang Kunyit; Langgar		
Tanjong Seri	Alor Mengkudu; Kampung Aor Buluh; Kampung Alor Malong; Tajar; Tandop		

=== Current state assembly members ===
No.	State Constituency	Member	Coalition (Party)
N09	Bukit Lada	Salim Mahmood	PN (PAS)
N10	Bukit Pinang	Romani Wan Salim	PN (PAS)
N11	Derga	Muhamad Amri Wahab	PN (BERSATU)

=== Local governments & postcodes ===
No.	State Constituency	Local Government	Postcode
N09	Bukit Lada	Alor Setar City Council	05000, 05100, 05200, 05300, 05350, 05460, 06550 Alor Setar; 06350, 06400 Pokok Sena; 06500 Langgar
N10	Bukit Pinang	Alor Setar City Council	05000, 05100, 05200, 05300, 05350, 05460, 06550 Alor Setar; 06350, 06400 Pokok Sena; 06500 Langgar
N11	Derga	Alor Setar City Council	05000, 05100, 05200, 05300, 05350, 05460, 06550 Alor Setar; 06350, 06400 Pokok Sena; 06500 Langgar

== Election results ==
Malaysian general election, 2022
Party	Candidate	Votes	%	∆%
PN	Ahmad Saad @ Yahaya	52,275	59.44	▲59.44
PH	Mahfuz Omar	20,524	23.34	▲23.34
BN	Noran Zamini Jamaluddin	14,523	16.51	▼9.48
Heritage	Noraini Md Salleh	622	0.71	▲0.71
Total valid votes		87,944	100.00	
Total rejected ballots		823		
Unreturned ballots		209		
Turnout		88,976	76.58	▼6.18
Registered electors		114,838		
Majority		31,751	36.10	▲28.25
PN gain from PKR		Swing		?
Source(s) https://lom.agc.gov.my/ilims/upload/portal/akta/outputp/1753260/PUB%20606%20(2022).pdf

Malaysian general election, 2018
Party	Candidate	Votes	%	∆%
PKR	Mahfuz Omar	28,959	40.93	▲40.93
PAS	Muhamad Radhi Mat Din	23,401	33.08	▼19.79
BN	Said Ali Syed Rastan	18,390	25.99	▼21.14
Total valid votes		70,750	100.00	
Total rejected ballots		869		
Unreturned ballots		291		
Turnout		71,910	82.76	▼3.38
Registered electors		86,892		
Majority		5,558	7.85	▲2.11
PKR gain from PAS		Swing		?
Source(s) "His Majesty's Government Gazette - Notice of Contested Election, Parliament for the State of Kedah [P.U. (B) 233/2018]" (PDF). Attorney General's Chambers of Malaysia. 3 May 2018. "Federal Government Gazette - Results of Contested Election and Statements of the Poll after the Official Addition of Votes, Parliamentary Constituencies for the State of Kedah [P.U. (B) 307/2018]" (PDF). Attorney General's Chambers of Malaysia. 28 May 2018.

Malaysian general election, 2013
Party	Candidate	Votes	%	∆%
PAS	Mahfuz Omar	36,198	52.87	▼2.47
BN	Shahlan Ismail	32,263	47.13	▲2.47
Total valid votes		68,461	100.00	
Total rejected ballots		848		
Unreturned ballots		215		
Turnout		69,524	86.14	▲6.70
Registered electors		80,714		
Majority		3,935	5.74	▼4.94
PAS hold		Swing		
Source(s) "Federal Government Gazette - Notice of Contested Election, Parliament for the State of Kedah [P.U. (B) 170/2013]" (PDF). Attorney General's Chambers of Malaysia. 26 April 2013. Archived from the original (PDF) on December 29, 2019. "Federal Government Gazette - Results of Contested Election and Statements of the Poll after the Official Addition of Votes, Parliamentary Constituencies for the State of Kedah [P.U. (B) 211/2013]" (PDF). Attorney General's Chambers of Malaysia. 22 May 2013.

Malaysian general election, 2008
Party	Candidate	Votes	%	∆%
PAS	Mahfuz Omar	29,687	55.34	▲12.34
BN	Abdul Rahman Ibrahim	23,956	44.66	▼12.34
Total valid votes		53,643	100.00	
Total rejected ballots		1,039		
Unreturned ballots		636		
Turnout		55,318	79.44	▼0.83
Registered electors		69,631		
Majority		5,731	10.68	▼3.32
PAS gain from BN		Swing		?

Malaysian general election, 2004
Party	Candidate	Votes	%	∆%
BN	Abdul Rahman Ibrahim	29,740	57.00	▲10.55
PAS	Mahfuz Omar	22,440	43.00	▼10.55
Total valid votes		52,180	100.00	
Total rejected ballots		855		
Unreturned ballots		0		
Turnout		53,035	80.27	▲2.80
Registered electors		66,070		
Majority		7,300	14.00	▲6.90
BN gain from PAS		Swing		?

Malaysian general election, 1999
Party	Candidate	Votes	%	∆%
PAS	Mahfuz Omar	27,466	53.55	▲8.57
BN	Wan Hanafiah Wan Mat Saman	23,829	46.45	▼8.57
Total valid votes		51,295	100.00	
Total rejected ballots		707		
Unreturned ballots		777		
Turnout		52,779	77.47	▲0.02
Registered electors		68,128		
Majority		3,637	7.10	▼2.94
PAS gain from BN		Swing		?

Malaysian general election, 1995
Party	Candidate	Votes	%
BN	Wan Hanafiah Wan Mat Saman	25,285	55.02
PAS	Mahfuz Omar	20,667	44.98
Total valid votes		45,952	100.00
Total rejected ballots		1,747	
Unreturned ballots		1,795	
Turnout		49,494	77.45
Registered electors		63,904	
Majority		4,618	10.04
This was a new constituency created.
