= Alor Mengkudu =

Political subdivision in Malaysia

Alor Mengkudu (N14)
Kedah constituency

State constituency
- Legislature: Kedah State Legislative Assembly
MLA
Muhamad Radhi Mat Din
PN
- Constituency created: 2003
- First contested: 2004
- Last contested: 2023

Demographics
- Population (2020): 48,326
- Electors (2023): 38,193

Alor Mengkudu is a state constituency in Kedah, Malaysia, that is represented in the Kedah State Legislative Assembly.

== Demographics ==
As of 2020, Alor Mengkudu has a population of 48,326 people.

Ethnic breakdown of Alor Mengkudu's electorate as of 2023
1. Malay (72.6%)
2. Chinese (23.8%)
3. Indian (2.74%)
4. Other ethnicities (0.88%)

== History ==
=== Polling districts ===
According to the gazette issued on 30 March 2018, the Alor Mengkudu constituency has a total of 15 polling districts.

State constituency	Polling districts	Code	Location
Alor Mengkudu（N14）	Kampung Gelam	009/14/01	SK Kampong Gelam
Alor Mengkudu（N14）	Alor Melintang	009/14/02	SK Alor Melintang
Alor Mengkudu（N14）	Titi Haji Idris	009/14/03	SK Hj Idris Tajar
Alor Mengkudu（N14）	Tok Sibil	009/14/04	SK Darul Hikmah
Alor Mengkudu（N14）	Alor Binjal	009/14/05	SMK Tajar
Alor Mengkudu（N14）	Tok Keling	009/14/06	SK Haji Wahab
Alor Mengkudu（N14）	Lahar Budi	009/14/07	SK Lahar Budi
Alor Mengkudu（N14）	Alor Mengkudu	009/14/08	SK Alor Mengkudu
Alor Mengkudu（N14）	Taman Saga	009/14/09	SMK Simpang Kuala
Alor Mengkudu（N14）	Taman Sultan Abdul Halim	009/14/10	SMK Convent
Alor Mengkudu（N14）	Jalan Langgar	009/14/11	Kolej Sultan Abdul Hamid
Alor Mengkudu（N14）	Kampung Tanjong Bendahara	009/14/12	SK Iskandar
Alor Mengkudu（N14）	Keriang Pulau	009/14/13	SM Teknik Alor Setar
Alor Mengkudu（N14）	Selarong	009/14/14	SMK Dato' Wan Mohd Saman
Alor Mengkudu（N14）	Tandop	009/14/15	SK Dato' Wan Mohd Saman

=== Representation history ===
Kedah State Legislative Assemblyman for Alor Mengkudu
Assembly	No	Years	Member	Party
Constituency created from Tanjong Seri
11th	N14	2004–2008	Fadzil Hanafi	BN (UMNO)
12th	N14	2008–2013	Ismail Salleh	PR (PAS)
13th	N14	2013–2015	Ahmad Saad @ Yahaya	PR (PAS)
13th	N14	2015–2016	Ahmad Saad @ Yahaya	PAS
13th	N14	2016–2018	Ahmad Saad @ Yahaya	GS (PAS)
14th	N14	2018–2022	Phahrolrazi Mohd Zawawi	PH (AMANAH)
14th	N14	2022–2023	Phahrolrazi Mohd Zawawi	IND
14th	N14	2023	Phahrolrazi Mohd Zawawi	PH (PKR)
15th	N14	2023–present	Muhamad Radhi Mat Din	PN (PAS)

== Election results ==
Kedah state election, 2023: Alor Mengkudu
Party	Candidate	Votes	%	∆%
PN	Muhamad Radhi Mat Din	18,936	68.19	▲68.19
PH	Mahfuz Omar	8,832	31.81	▲31.81
Total valid votes		27,768	100.00	
Total rejected ballots		117		
Unreturned ballots		36		
Turnout		27,921	73.11	▼10.49
Registered electors		38,193		
Majority		10,104	36.38	▲27.95
PN gain from PKR		Swing		?

Kedah state election, 2018: Alor Mengkudu
Party	Candidate	Votes	%	∆%
PKR	Phahrolrazi Mohd Zawawi	8,840	39.75	▲39.75
PAS	Ahmad Saad @ Yahaya	6,964	31.32	▼22.28
BN	Abdul Malik Saad	6,434	28.93	▼15.95
Total valid votes		22,238	100.00	
Total rejected ballots		357		
Unreturned ballots		0		
Turnout		22,681	83.60	▼1.74
Registered electors		27,132		
Majority		1,876	8.43	▼0.29
PKR gain from PAS		Swing		?

Kedah state election, 2013: Alor Mengkudu
Party	Candidate	Votes	%	∆%
PAS	Ahmad Saad @ Yahaya	11,453	53.60	▼3.35
BN	Sharifah Maznah Syed Kassim Barakbah	9,588	44.88	▲1.83
Independent	Fadzil Hanafi	325	1.52	▲1.52
Total valid votes		21,366	100.00	
Total rejected ballots		273		
Unreturned ballots		0		
Turnout		21,639	85.34	▲7.61
Registered electors		25,357		
Majority		1,865	8.72	▼5.18
PAS hold		Swing		

Kedah state election, 2008: Alor Mengkudu
Party	Candidate	Votes	%	∆%
PAS	Ismail Salleh	9,208	56.95	▲16.15
BN	Mazlan Abdul Rahman	6,961	43.05	▼16.15
Total valid votes		16,169	100.00	
Total rejected ballots		251		
Unreturned ballots		40		
Turnout		16,460	77.73	▼2.03
Registered electors		21,175		
Majority		2,247	13.90	▼4.50
PAS gain from BN		Swing		?

Kedah state election, 2004: Alor Mengkudu
Party	Candidate	Votes	%
BN	Fadzil Hanafi	9,095	59.20
PAS	Mohamad Sabu	6,268	40.80
Total valid votes		15,363	100.00
Total rejected ballots		182	
Unreturned ballots		0	
Turnout		15,545	79.76
Registered electors		19,489	
Majority		2,827	18.40
This was a new constituency created.
