= Jitra (state constituency) =

Constituency in Kedah, Malaysia

Jitra (N06)
Kedah constituency

State constituency
- Legislature: Kedah State Legislative Assembly
MLA
Haim Hilman Abdullah
PN
- Constituency created: 1959
- First contested: 1959
- Last contested: 2023

Demographics
- Electors (2023): 63,059

Jitra is a state constituency in Kedah, Malaysia, that has been represented in the Kedah State Legislative Assembly.

== Demographics ==
As of 2020, Jitra has a population of 94,798 people.

Ethnic breakdown of Jitra's electorate as of 2023
1. Malay (83.8%)
2. Chinese (10.1%)
3. Indian (4.27%)
4. Other ethnicities (1.83%)

== History ==
=== Polling districts ===
According to the gazette issued on 30 March 2018, the Jitra constituency has a total of 22 polling districts.

| State constituency | Polling districts | Code | Location |
|---|---|---|---|
| Jitra (N06) | Paya Kemunting | 006/06/01 | SJK (T) Paya Kemunting |
| Jitra (N06) | Kampung Kuluang | 006/06/02 | SK Binjal |
| Jitra (N06) | Malau | 006/06/03 | SK Malau |
| Jitra (N06) | Padang Panjang | 006/06/04 | SK Malau |
| Jitra (N06) | Wang Tepus | 006/06/05 | SK Penghulu Hj Darus |
| Jitra (N06) | Taman Jitra Jaya | 006/06/06 | SK Jitra |
| Jitra (N06) | Taman Rasa Sayang | 006/06/07 | SJK (C) Chung Hwa |
| Jitra (N06) | Taman Pasu | 006/06/08 | SK Sultan Ahmad Tajuddin |
| Jitra (N06) | Kampung Telok Nibong | 006/06/09 | SK Jitra 3 |
| Jitra (N06) | Kampung Batu 13 | 006/06/10 | SMK Paya Kemunting |
| Jitra (N06) | Taman Jitra | 006/06/11 | SMK Jitra |
| Jitra (N06) | Pantai Halban | 006/06/12 | SK Bandar Baru Darulaman |
| Jitra (N06) | Kampung Tok Kesop | 006/06/13 | SK Jitra 2 |
| Jitra (N06) | Tanah Merah | 006/06/14 | SMK Tanjung Pauh |
| Jitra (N06) | Kampung Telok Malik | 006/06/15 | SK Telok Malek |
| Jitra (N06) | Kampung Naga | 006/06/16 | SK Padang Pekan |
| Jitra (N06) | Lubuk Kawah | 006/06/17 | SMK Sultan Abdul Halim |
| Jitra (N06) | Taman Mahsuri | 006/06/18 | SMK Bandar Baru Darulaman |
| Jitra (N06) | Alor Rambai | 006/06/19 | SMK Tuanku Anum Tuanku Abdul Rahman |
| Jitra (N06) | Lubok Batu | 006/06/20 | SK Seri Banai |
| Jitra (N06) | Bukit Tinggi | 006/06/21 | SK Bukit Tinggi |
| Jitra (N06) | Kepala Batas | 006/06/22 | SK Kepala Batas |

=== Representation history ===
Kedah State Legislative Assemblyman for Jitra
| Assembly | No | Years | Member | Party |
Constituency created
| 1st | N01 | 1959–1964 | Omar Salleh | Alliance (UMNO) |
| 2nd | N01 | 1964–1965 | Omar Salleh | Alliance (UMNO) |
| 2nd | N01 | 1965–1969 | Mohamed Zain Ahmad | Alliance (UMNO) |
| | | 1969–1971 | State assembly was suspended | |
| 3rd | N01 | 1971–1973 | Osman @ Mohd Daud Aroff | Alliance (UMNO) |
| 3rd | N01 | 1973–1974 | Osman @ Mohd Daud Aroff | BN (UMNO) |
| 4th | N04 | 1974–1978 | Osman @ Mohd Daud Aroff | BN (UMNO) |
| 5th | N04 | 1978–1982 | Osman @ Mohd Daud Aroff | BN (UMNO) |
| 6th | N04 | 1982–1986 | Osman @ Mohd Daud Aroff | BN (UMNO) |
| 7th | N04 | 1986–1990 | Osman @ Mohd Daud Aroff | BN (UMNO) |
| 8th | N04 | 1990–1995 | Osman @ Mohd Daud Aroff | BN (UMNO) |
| 9th | N06 | 1995–1999 | Osman @ Mohd Daud Aroff | BN (UMNO) |
| 10th | N06 | 1999–2004 | Othman Ishak | BN (UMNO) |
| 11th | N06 | 2004–2008 | Othman Ishak | BN (UMNO) |
| 12th | N06 | 2008–2013 | Saad Man | BN (UMNO) |
| 13th | N06 | 2013–2018 | Aminuddin Omar | BN (UMNO) |
| 14th | N06 | 2018–2020 | Mukhriz Mahathir | PH (BERSATU) |
| 14th | N06 | 2020 | Mukhriz Mahathir | BERSATU |
| 14th | N06 | 2020–2023 | Mukhriz Mahathir | PEJUANG |
| 15th | N06 | 2023–present | Haim Hilman Abdullah | PN (PAS) |

== Election results ==
Kedah state election, 2023
| Party | Candidate | Votes | % | ∆% |
|---|---|---|---|---|
| PN | Haim Hilman Abdullah | 34,342 | 75.46 | ▲75.46 |
| PH | Sabrina Ahmad | 11,170 | 24.54 | ▼31.04 |
| Total valid votes | | 45,512 | 100.00 | |
| Total rejected ballots | | 216 | | |
| Unreturned ballots | | 64 | | |
| Turnout | | 45,792 | 72.62 | ▼10.69 |
| Registered electors | | 63,059 | | |
| Majority | | 23,172 | 50.92 | ▲18.93 |
| PN gain from PKR | | Swing | | ? |

Kedah state election, 2018
| Party | Candidate | Votes | % | ∆% |
|---|---|---|---|---|
| PKR | Mukhriz Mahathir | 18,852 | 55.58 | ▲55.58 |
| BN | Aminuddin Omar | 8,003 | 23.59 | ▼31.32 |
| PAS | Ahmad Azhar Abdullah | 7,064 | 20.83 | ▼24.26 |
| Total valid votes | | 33,919 | 100.00 | |
| Total rejected ballots | | 333 | | |
| Unreturned ballots | | 0 | | |
| Turnout | | 34,381 | 83.31 | ▼3.99 |
| Registered electors | | 41,267 | | |
| Majority | | 10,849 | 31.99 | ▲22.17 |
| PKR gain from BN | | Swing | | ? |

Kedah state election, 2013
| Party | Candidate | Votes | % | ∆% |
|---|---|---|---|---|
| BN | Aminuddin Omar | 17,094 | 54.91 | ▼0.25 |
| PAS | Rohani Abd Muttalib | 14,038 | 45.09 | ▲0.25 |
| Total valid votes | | 31,132 | 100.00 | |
| Total rejected ballots | | 394 | | |
| Unreturned ballots | | 182 | | |
| Turnout | | 31,078 | 87.30 | ▲8.55 |
| Registered electors | | 36,322 | | |
| Majority | | 3,056 | 9.82 | ▼0.50 |
| BN hold | | Swing | | |

Kedah state election, 2008
| Party | Candidate | Votes | % | ∆% |
|---|---|---|---|---|
| BN | Saad Man | 12,065 | 55.16 | ▼8.65 |
| PAS | Rohani Abd Muttalib | 9,807 | 44.84 | ▲8.65 |
| Total valid votes | | 21,872 | 100.00 | |
| Total rejected ballots | | 373 | | |
| Unreturned ballots | | 67 | | |
| Turnout | | 22,312 | 78.75 | ▼2.64 |
| Registered electors | | 28,331 | | |
| Majority | | 2,258 | 10.32 | ▼17.30 |
| BN hold | | Swing | | |

Kedah state election, 2004
| Party | Candidate | Votes | % | ∆% |
|---|---|---|---|---|
| BN | Othman Ishak | 13,297 | 63.81 | ▲1.80 |
| PAS | Rohani Abd Muttalib | 7,541 | 36.19 | ▼1.80 |
| Total valid votes | | 20,838 | 100.00 | |
| Total rejected ballots | | 372 | | |
| Unreturned ballots | | 59 | | |
| Turnout | | 21,269 | 81.39 | ▲3.17 |
| Registered electors | | 26,131 | | |
| Majority | | 5,756 | 27.62 | ▲3.60 |
| BN hold | | Swing | | |

Kedah state election, 1999
| Party | Candidate | Votes | % | ∆% |
|---|---|---|---|---|
| BN | Othman Ishak | 10,928 | 62.01 | ▲4.24 |
| PAS | Mat Nanyan | 6,694 | 37.99 | ▼4.24 |
| Total valid votes | | 17,622 | 100.00 | |
| Total rejected ballots | | 381 | | |
| Unreturned ballots | | 21 | | |
| Turnout | | 18,024 | 78.22 | ▲1.57 |
| Registered electors | | 23,042 | | |
| Majority | | 4,234 | 24.02 | ▲8.48 |
| BN hold | | Swing | | |

Kedah state election, 1995
| Party | Candidate | Votes | % | ∆% |
|---|---|---|---|---|
| BN | Osman @ Mohd Daud Aroff | 9,483 | 57.77 | ▼21.34 |
| PAS | Abu Kassim Lebai Abdullah | 6,933 | 42.23 | ▲42.23 |
| Total valid votes | | 16,416 | 100.00 | |
| Total rejected ballots | | 300 | | |
| Unreturned ballots | | 40 | | |
| Turnout | | 16,727 | 76.65 | ▼0.81 |
| Registered electors | | 21,822 | | |
| Majority | | 2,550 | 15.54 | ▼42.68 |
| BN hold | | Swing | | |

Kedah state election, 1990
| Party | Candidate | Votes | % | ∆% |
|---|---|---|---|---|
| BN | Osman @ Mohd Daud Aroff | 15,083 | 79.11 | ▲5.99 |
| S46 | Abd Rashid Mohd Salleh | 3,982 | 20.89 | ▲20.89 |
| Total valid votes | | 19,065 | 100.00 | |
| Total rejected ballots | | 785 | | |
| Unreturned ballots | | 0 | | |
| Turnout | | 19,862 | 77.46 | ▲4.62 |
| Registered electors | | 25,976 | | |
| Majority | | 11,101 | 58.22 | ▲10.66 |
| BN hold | | Swing | | |

Kedah state election, 1986
| Party | Candidate | Votes | % | ∆% |
|---|---|---|---|---|
| BN | Osman @ Mohd Daud Aroff | 12,876 | 73.78 | ▲0.28 |
| PAS | Mohd. Kamal Haji Ismail | 4,577 | 26.22 | ▼0.28 |
| Total valid votes | | 17,453 | 100.00 | |
| Total rejected ballots | | 533 | | |
| Unreturned ballots | | 0 | | |
| Turnout | | 17,986 | 72.84 | ▼3.58 |
| Registered electors | | 24,692 | | |
| Majority | | 8,299 | 47.56 | ▲0.46 |
| BN hold | | Swing | | |

Kedah state election, 1982
| Party | Candidate | Votes | % | ∆% |
|---|---|---|---|---|
| BN | Osman @ Mohd Daud Aroff | 11,851 | 73.55 | ▲9.94 |
| PAS | Mohamad @ Mohd Salleh Yaacob | 4,262 | 26.45 | ▼9.94 |
| Total valid votes | | 16,113 | 100.00 | |
| Total rejected ballots | | 367 | | |
| Unreturned ballots | | 0 | | |
| Turnout | | 16,480 | 76.42 | ▼0.33 |
| Registered electors | | 21,564 | | |
| Majority | | 7,589 | 47.10 | ▲19.88 |
| BN hold | | Swing | | |

Kedah state election, 1978
| Party | Candidate | Votes | % | ∆% |
|---|---|---|---|---|
| BN | Osman @ Mohd Daud Aroff | 8,508 | 63.61 | ▲63.61 |
| PAS | Ahmad Yusof | 4,868 | 36.39 | ▲36.39 |
| Total valid votes | | 13,376 | 100.00 | |
| Total rejected ballots | | 662 | | |
| Unreturned ballots | | 0 | | |
| Turnout | | 14,038 | 76.75 | |
| Registered electors | | 18,291 | | |
| Majority | | 3,640 | 27.22 | |
| BN hold | | Swing | | |

Kedah state election, 1974
| Party | Candidate | Votes | % | ∆% |
|---|---|---|---|---|
On Nomination Day, Osman @ Mohd Daud Aroff won uncontested.
| BN | Osman @ Mohd Daud Aroff | | | |
| Total valid votes | | | 100.00 | |
| Total rejected ballots | | | | |
| Unreturned ballots | | | | |
| Turnout | | | | |
| Registered electors | | 16,774 | | |
| Majority | | | | |
| BN hold | | Swing | | |

Kedah state election, 1969
| Party | Candidate | Votes | % | ∆% |
|---|---|---|---|---|
| Alliance | Osman @ Mohd Daud Aroff | 7,637 | 59.49 | ▼8.12 |
| PMIP | Ayob Haji Jasin | 5,193 | 40.51 | ▲8.12 |
| Total valid votes | | 12,820 | 100.00 | |
| Total rejected ballots | | 899 | | |
| Unreturned ballots | | 0 | | |
| Turnout | | 13,719 | 77.60 | ▲5.55 |
| Registered electors | | 17,690 | | |
| Majority | | 2,434 | 18.98 | ▼16.24 |
| Alliance hold | | Swing | | |

Kedah state by-election, 19 August 1965 upon the death of Haji Omar Salleh
| Party | Candidate | Votes | % | ∆% |
|---|---|---|---|---|
| Alliance | Mohamed Zain Ahmad | 7,297 | 67.61 | ▼7.79 |
| PMIP | Abu Bakar Omar | 3,495 | 32.39 | ▲7.79 |
| Total valid votes | | 10,792 | 100.00 | |
| Total rejected ballots | | 194 | | |
| Unreturned ballots | | 0 | | |
| Turnout | | 10,986 | 72.05 | ▼5.35 |
| Registered electors | | 15,248 | | |
| Majority | | 3,802 | 35.22 | ▼15.58 |
| Alliance hold | | Swing | | |

Kedah state election, 1964
| Party | Candidate | Votes | % | ∆% |
|---|---|---|---|---|
| Alliance | Haji Omar Haji Salleh | 7,974 | 75.40 | ▼3.12 |
| PMIP | Abdul Rahim Hassan | 2,601 | 24.60 | ▲3.12 |
| Total valid votes | | 10,575 | 100.00 | |
| Total rejected ballots | | 698 | | |
| Unreturned ballots | | 0 | | |
| Turnout | | 11,273 | 77.40 | ▼1.10 |
| Registered electors | | 14,564 | | |
| Majority | | 5,373 | 50.80 | ▼6.24 |
| Alliance hold | | Swing | | |

Kedah state election, 1959
| Party | Candidate | Votes | % |
|---|---|---|---|
| Alliance | Haji Omar Haji Salleh | 6,267 | 78.52 |
| PMIP | Lebai Isa Haji Muhammad | 1,714 | 21.48 |
| Total valid votes | | 17,981 | 100.00 |
| Total rejected ballots | | 415 | |
| Unreturned ballots | | 0 | |
| Turnout | | 8,396 | 78.50 |
| Registered electors | | 10,700 | |
| Majority | | 4,553 | 57.04 |
This was a new constituency created.
