= Muhamad Radhi Mat Din =

Malaysian footballer, coach and politician

Yang Berhormat Tuan Muhamad Radhi Mat Din MLA
- محمد راضي مت دين

Member of the Kedah State Executive Council
- Incumbent
- Assumed office 21 August 2023 (Consumerism, Living Costs, Youth and Sports)
- Monarch: Sallehuddin
- Menteri Besar: Muhammad Sanusi Md Nor
- Preceded by: Mohd Firdaus Ahmad (Youth & Sports); Portfolio established (Consumerism & Living Costs)
- Constituency: Alor Mengkudu

Member of the Kedah State Legislative Assembly for Alor Mengkudu
- Incumbent
- Assumed office 12 August 2023
- Preceded by: Phahrolrazi Zawawi (PH–AMANAH)
- Majority: 10,104 (2023)

Personal details
- Born: Muhamad Radhi bin Mat Din; 17 July 1965 (age 61) Pokok Sena, Kedah, Malaysia
- Party: Malaysian Islamic Party (PAS)
- Other political affiliations: Perikatan Nasional (PN)
- Occupation: Politician
- Profession: Football Coach, Retired Footballer

Muhamad Radhi Mat Din
Personal information
- Position: Midfielder

Team information
- Current team: Kedah FA (assistant coach)

Senior career*
Years	Team	Apps	(Gls)
1986–1992	Kedah PKNK	58	(8)
1986–2000	Kedah FA	?	(?)

International career
1987–1991	Malaysia	14	(4)
- * Club domestic league appearances and goals

Yang Berhormat Muhamad Radhi bin Mat Din (born 17 July 1965) is a Malaysian politician, football coach and retired footballer who has served as a Member of the Kedah State Executive Council (EXCO) in the Perikatan Nasional (PN) state administration under Menteri Besar Muhammad Sanusi Md Nor and Member of the Kedah State Legislative Assembly (MLA) for Alor Mengkudu since August 2023.

== Football career ==
He spent his entire career by playing in midfield for Kedah FA, where he was also the longest serving captain in club history starting from 1991 to 2000. Radhi made his debut in 1986 and cemented his place in the first team in the 1987 season, succeeding Lee Kin Hong as Kedah team captain in 1991.

Radhi was an integral part in the golden era of the Darul Aman based club during the 1980s and 1990s where Kedah reached the Malaysia Cup final matches for seven times from 1987 to 1993. He collected two Malaysia Cup winners medal in 1990 and 1993; Division 1 title in 1993; and FA Cup in 1996. After Kedah won the League and FA Cup championship in 1993, Radhi was honoured with the Malaysian Best Player.

Radhi had a good goal-scoring record, tackle, corner-kick taker and pass well. He represented Malaysia for about four years from 1989 to 1993. Radhi also known by the nickname "Captain Marvel" among Kedah fans during his playing careers with his similar characters of English former footballer Bryan Robson.

Radhi played for the Malaysia national football team at the 1989 Sea Games and won gold medal.

After his playing career ended, he was employed by Kedah, serving as their second tactician behind Mohd Azraai Khor Abdullah alongside his former teammate and Kedah legendary goalkeeper Ahmad Sabri Ismail which three of them generated Kedah to clinched the double treble titles in 2006/07 and 2007/08 M.League seasons.

== Political career ==
On 14 April 2018, Radhi was announced as a candidate of Malaysian Islamic Party (PAS) for the federal constituency of Pokok Sena, Kedah in the 2018 Malaysia general election. In the election, Radhi garnered 23,401 votes and was defeated by the incumbent Mahfuz Omar from Parti Amanah Negara (AMANAH) of Pakatan Harapan (PH) by majority of 5558 votes. He was later elected as a member of Kedah state assemblyman for Alor Mengkudu after defeated Mahfuz Omar in 2023.

== Election results ==
Parliament of Malaysia
Year	Constituency	Candidate	Votes	Pct	Opponent(s)	Votes	Pct	Ballots cast	Majority	Turnout
2018	P008 Pokok Sena	Muhamad Radhi Mat Din (PAS)	23,401	33.08%	Mahfuz Omar (AMANAH)	28,959	40.93%	71,910	5,558	82.76%
2018	P008 Pokok Sena	Muhamad Radhi Mat Din (PAS)	23,401	33.08%	Said Ali Said Rastan (UMNO)	18,390	25.99%	71,910	5,558	82.76%

Kedah State Legislative Assembly
Year	Constituency	Candidate	Votes	Pct	Opponent(s)	Votes	Pct	Ballots cast	Majority	Turnout
2023	N14 Alor Mengkudu	Muhamad Radhi Mat Din (PAS)	18,936	68.19%	Mahfuz Omar (AMANAH)	8,832	31.81%	27,885	10,104	72.70%
