= Farmers' Organisation Authority =

- Lembaga Pertubuhan Peladang
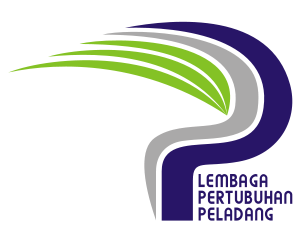

Agency overview
- Formed: February 14, 1973; 53 years ago
- Headquarters: Menara LPP, Kuala Lumpur, Malaysia
- Employees: 3,058 (2016)
- Minister responsible: Mohamad Sabu, Minister of Agriculture and Food Security
- Agency executive: Mahfuz Omar, Chairman
- Website: www.lpp.gov.my

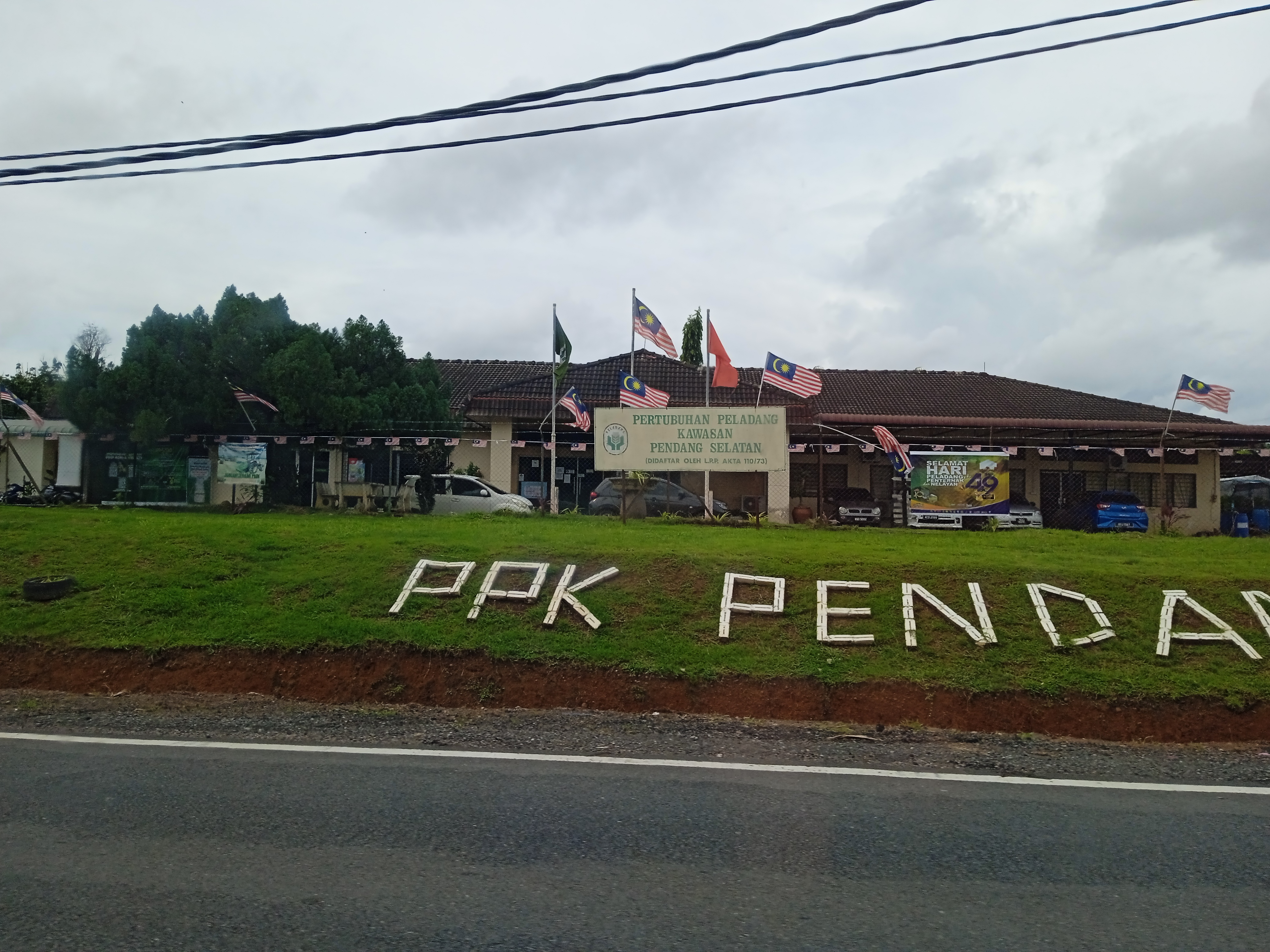
One's of Farmers' Organisation Authority branch in Kedah, which is FOA Pendang Selatan at Kampung Sawa Kechil, Pendang District

Farmers' Organisation Authority (FOA, Malay: Lembaga Pertubuhan Peladang, LPP) is a Malaysian government statutory body under the Ministry of Agriculture and Food Security.

== History ==
Farmers' Organisation Authority was founded on 14 February 1973 through the gazetting of Lembaga Pertubuhan Peladang 1973 Act (Act 110). FOA was founded to carry the responsibility of helping to strengthen the social and economy of agricultural communities under a specific body with specific functions.

Act 109, Pertubuhan Peladang 1973 Act was specially formulated to restructure farmers' societies and agro-based cooperatives. Under the jurisdiction of this act, farmers' societies are abolished and were registered again as farmers' organisation (FO), while agro-based cooperatives will become units of FO. To date, there are 1531 agro-based cooperatives and 119 FO servicing rural agricultural communities.

== Vision and Mission ==
=== Vision ===
Farmers’ Organisation Authority (FOA) as a leading agency promoting the development of professionally managed farmers' organisations.

=== Mission ===
To develop Farmers’ Organisation as an effective services provider towards the creation of commercial farmers.

== Functions of FOA ==
The functions of the FOA as laid down in the Act are as follows:-

- To boost, encourage and endeavour economic and social progress of farmers’ organisations
- To register, control and supervise Farmers’ Organisations and making provision for related matters. If a declaration was made through announcement under section 10, to design and implement any agricultural development in Farmers' Organization of those area and
- To control and co-ordinate the implementation of the activities

FOA implements all these activities that can be collated within three main functions as follow :

- functions as Registrar
- functions as Management Agent and
- functions as Development Agent.

=== Registrar’s Function ===
Director General of FOA is Registrar of Farmers’ Organisation (FO) and agriculture-based cooperatives and is responsible for registering, supervising and controlling including auditing of account of all Area Farmers' Organization (AFO) and agriculture-based cooperatives. The power and tasks of the agency and registrar are related to :

- As Registrar of FO and agriculture-based cooperatives
- To supervise and control all activities of FO and agriculture-based cooperatives.
- To audit and control the account.
- To revoke registrations including abolishment of any organisation: and
- To give education and training to members

The Registrar has appointed the Chief Executives for related agencies as its representatives to facilitate operation and effectiveness of tasks and responsibilities of registrar in MADA, KADA and Sarawak. Director of state AFO were also appointed. However, the power to form, register, suspend, abolish and others are still under the jurisdiction of the Registrar.

=== Management Functions ===
FOA gives management service to FO to facilitate operations and implements projects efficiently. The services given include staff administration, management services, training of staff of FO and consultancy services.

=== Development Functions ===
The main thrust of FOA is to explore the economic and social development of FO and implements in an efficient and integrated manner to increase the income of FO to benefit members. Under the Ninth Malaysia Plan (2006–2010), the Federal Government has allocated RM291 million for specific economic and social development of FO.

== Roles of FOA ==
FOA implements program and projects in line with current government policy in agriculture and rural development area including issues to reduce poverty gap and restructuring of society. The most relevant FOA's involvement in government policy are as follows:-

=== National Agricultural Development Policy (NAP) ===
FOA plays assisting role in implementing balanced development in the program and projects to eradicate poverty and restructuring of society under National Development Policy. FOA implements various activities related to policies in the Third Draft Plan Perspective (2001–2010). These policies are related to:

- Developing a resilient country
- Developing towards a just society,
- Maintaining economic growth,
- Being Competitive globally,
- Developing economy that is based on knowledge (K-Economy),
- Strengthening of Human Resource Development,
- Development that preserve environment

=== The Third National Agricultural Policy (NAP 3) 1998–2010 ===
Under NAP 3, the direction, strategy and mechanism of new policy implementations were emphasised on agriculture and economy in total, concentration in food security, productivity, inflation, private sector investment in agriculture, export promotion and import reduction of imports that are not productive and conservation and usage of appropriate natural resources. Five FOA's main functions under FOA's Corporate Plan (2000–2005) and National Agriculture Policy are as follows:

- Stimulate and organise farmers to venture into agriculture projects that are based on climate and soil suitability, market demand and ability.
- Strengthening farmers’ institution in line with the Third National Agriculture Policy that aims to transform FO to become a business oriented organisation.
- Enhance entrepreneur farmers' development.
- Enhance human resource development.
- Equip FO with Information Technology facilities to enable them as the leading local agency in the rural sector.

== National Farmers, Breeders and Fishermen Day ==
The Sixth of August each year was gazetted as National Farmers, Breeders and Fishermen Day by the late Allahyarham Tun Abdul Razak. The celebration was first held on 6 August 1975 at the Parliament's compound with the theme of "Farmers' Unity – Farmers Are Important to the Country's Stability".

== Events ==
Year	Date	Occasion
1968	26 February	Establishment of the first Area Farmers' Association, Persatuan Peladang Mukim Kampung Buaia, Lubuk Merbau, Padang Rengas, Perak.
1971	7 July	Establishment of the first State Farmers' Association, Persatuan Peladang Negeri Johor.
1972	24 March	Inauguration of National Farmers Association (NAFAS).
	6 August	Inauguration of Innovation Drive in conjunction with Terengganu State Development fest.
1973	14 February	FOA established.
	13 August	FOA launched.
	19 November	First meeting of FOA Authority Body and Farmers Advisory Council.
1974	22 June	First convention of National Farmers' Association Representation Council.
	20 December	Green Book Plan aka Successful Earth Drive was launched.
1975	25 February	Official opening of Machang Farmers' Advancement Centre, Kelantan.
	6 August	First National Farmers' Day.
1976	8 March	Official opening of Area Farmers' Organization of Repek / Telong, Bachok, Kelantan.
	26 March	Establishment of KNB~LPP, FOA staff cooperative.
1979	2 June	Official opening of AFO Lembah Pergau / Kuala Balah, Kuala Krai, Kelantan.
1981	29 June	Official opening of Farmers Advancement Centre of Ulu Kusial, Kelantan.
1983		Establishment of Farmers' Organization Authority of Federal Territory of Labuan.
1991	25 February	Official opening of Johor State FOA Complex building.
1992	18 May	Official opening of the office of AFO Gombak / Petaling, Selangor.
1993	3 February	Establishment of Sabah State FOA.
1994	3 March	Permodalan Peladang Berhad (PPB) was founded.
1995	22 June	First Annual General Meeting of Permodalan Peladang Berhad.
	26 June	Official opening of Peladang Inn Tioman, Pulau Tioman, Pahang
	13 December	Establishment of Peladang HeiTech Sdn. Bhd.
1996	18 April	Official opening of Perak State FOA building.
	23 May	Farmers' Education Foundation was founded.
1998	6 December	Official opening of farmers management institute, Institut Pengurusan Peladang (IPP) Langkawi, Kedah.
2002	29 November	Establishment of agricultural entrepreneur club, Kelab Usahawan Tani (KUAT).
2006	23 January	Inauguration of FOA new logo.
