= 2018 Kedah state election =

Malaysian state election

- 9 May 2018

All 36 seats to the Kedah State Legislative Assembly 19 seats needed for a majority
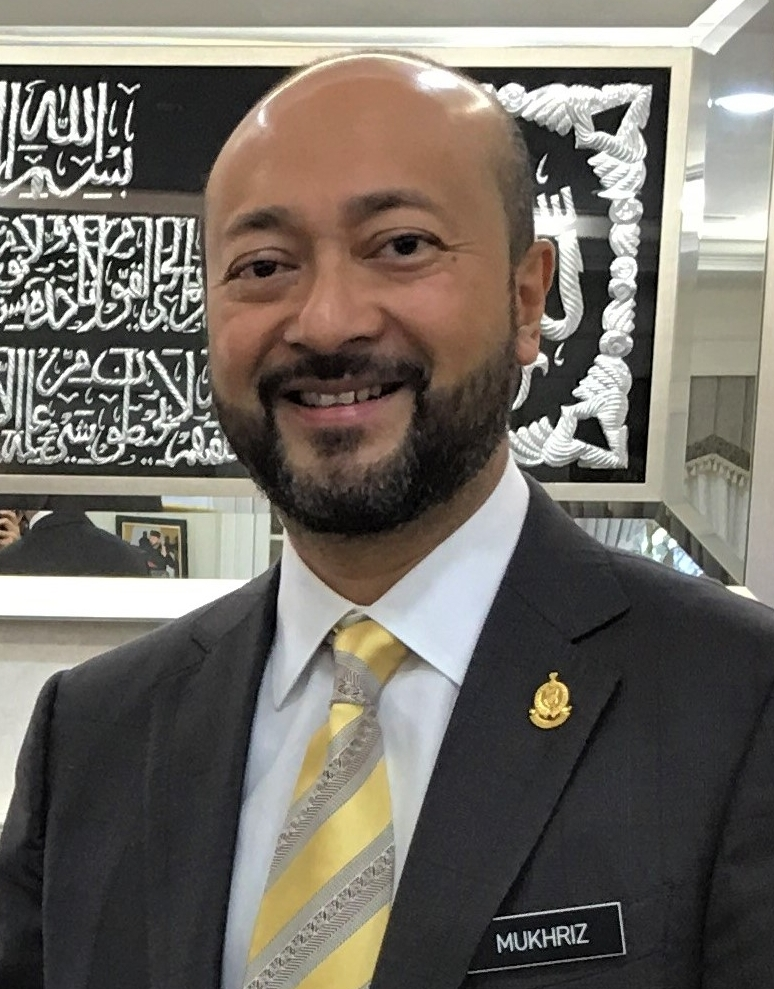

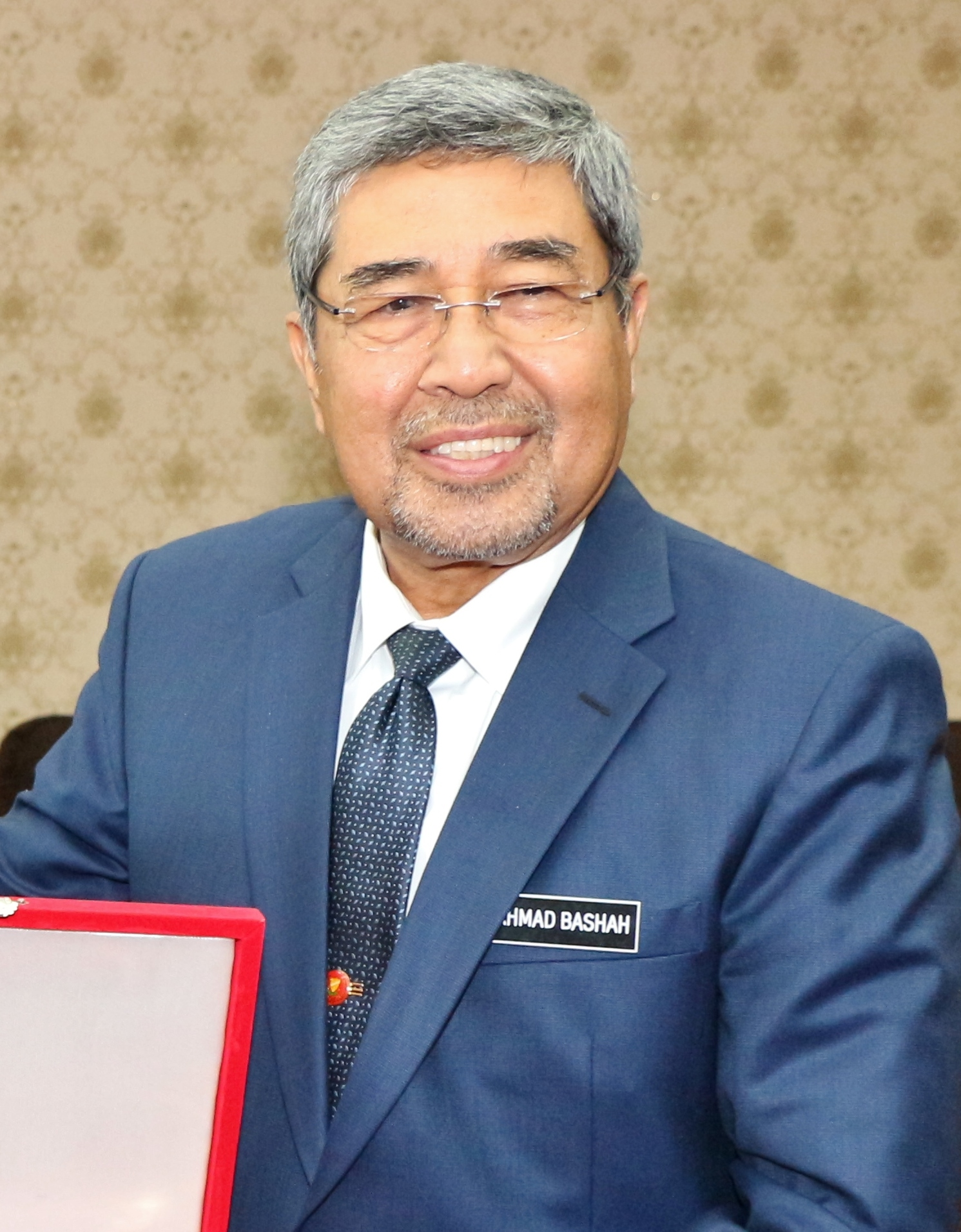
	First party	Second party	Third party
		GS
Leader	Mukhriz Mahathir	Ahmad Fakhruddin Fakhrurazi	Ahmad Bashah Md. Hanipah
Party	Pakatan Harapan (Bersatu)	Gagasan Sejahtera (PAS)	Barisan Nasional (UMNO)
Leader since	7 January 2018	2017	2016
Leader's seat	Jitra	Pengkalan Kundor (lost seat)	Bakar Bata (lost seat)
Last election	7 seats, 16.31% (Pakatan Rakyat)	8 seats, 32.42%, (Pakatan Rakyat)	21 seats, 50.37%
Seats before	9	7	20
Seats won	18	15	3
Seat change	▲9	▲8	▼17
Popular vote	343,519	313,171	278,694
Percentage	36.5%	33.7%	29.6%
Swing	▲20.2%	▲1.3%	▼20.8%
- Pakatan Harapan seats: DAP PKR Bersatu Amanah Opposition seats: PAS UMNO
Menteri Besar before election
Ahmad Bashah Md Hanipah
BN
Elected Menteri Besar
Mukhriz Mahathir
Pakatan Harapan

The 14th Kedah State election was held on 9 May 2018, concurrently with the 2018 Malaysian general election. The previous state election was held on 5 May 2013. The state assemblymen is elected to 5 years term each.

The Kedah State Legislative Assembly would automatically dissolve on 23 June 2018, the fifth anniversary of the first sitting, and elections must be held within sixty days (two months) of the dissolution (on or before 21 August 2018, with the date to be decided by the Election Commission), unless dissolved prior to that date by the Head of State (Sultan of Kedah) on the advice of the Head of Government (Menteri Besar of Kedah).

The state election resulting in a hung parliament, as no parties gained simple majority. Pakatan Harapan (PH) gained a plurality in the election, winning 18 seats but still short of 1 seat for a simple majority win; nevertheless PH were invited by Sultan of Kedah to form the state government. Mukhriz Mahathir, from BERSATU, was sworn in as Menteri Besar on 11 May 2018. This is Mukhriz's second term as Menteri Besar, having held the position from 2013 to 2016 under his previous party UMNO-BN.

== Contenders ==
Barisan Nasional (BN) contested all 36 seats in Kedah State Legislative Assembly. Barisan Nasional (BN) linchpin party United Malays National Organisation (UNMO) is to set to contest major share of Barisan Nasional (BN) seats.

Pan-Malaysian Islamic Party (PAS) also contested all 36 seats in Kedah.

Pakatan Harapan have decided to contest all 36 seats in Kedah. On 4 February 2018, Pakatan Harapan has yet to finalize 4 seats. The seats are Guar Chempedak, Pantai Merdeka, Gurun and Kulim. On 26 February 2018, Pakatan Harapan has completed the distribution of seats in Kedah. Malaysian United Indigenous Party (Bersatu) is to set to contest major share of Pakatan Harapan seats. Malaysian United Indigenous Party (Bersatu) will contest in 14 seats while the National Trust Party (Amanah) will have 10 seats. People's Justice Party (PKR) and the Democratic Action Party (DAP) will contest 10 and 2 seats.

=== Political parties ===
Coalition			Other parties
Incumbent	Opposition		Other parties
Barisan Nasional (BN)	Pakatan Harapan (PH)	Gagasan Sejahtera (GS)	Parti Rakyat Malaysia (PRM)
United Malays National Organisation (UMNO); Malaysian Chinese Association (MCA); Malaysian Indian Congress (MIC); Parti Gerakan Rakyat Malaysia (Gerakan)	Malaysian United Indigenous Party (Bersatu); National Trust Party (Amanah); People's Justice Party (PKR); Democratic Action Party (DAP)	Pan-Malaysian Islamic Party (PAS)	Parti Rakyat Malaysia (PRM)

== The contested seats ==
No.	State constituency	Incumbent State Assemblyman	Political parties							
No.	State constituency	Incumbent State Assemblyman	Barisan Nasional		Pakatan Harapan		Gagasan Sejahtera		Other parties/Ind	
No.	State constituency	Incumbent State Assemblyman	Candidate Name	Party	Candidate Name	Party	Candidate Name	Party	Candidate Name	Party
N01	Ayer Hangat	Mohd Rawi Abdul Hamid (BN)	Mohd Rawi Abdul Hamid	UMNO	Johari Bulat	Bersatu	Azlina Azinan	PAS	—N/a	—N/a
N02	Kuah	Nor Saidi Nanyan (BN)	Nor Saidi Nanyan	UMNO	Mohd Firdaus Ahmad	Bersatu	Mazlan Ahmad	PAS	Mohamad Ratu Mansor	IND
N03	Kota Siputeh	Abu Hasan Sarif (BN)	Ahmad Azhar Abdullah	UMNO	Salmee Said	Amanah	Mat Rejab Md Akhir	PAS	—N/a	—N/a
N04	Ayer Hitam	Mukhriz Mahathir (PH)	Abu Hasan Sarif	UMNO	A. Aziz Mohamod	Bersatu	Azhar Ibrahim	PAS	—N/a	—N/a
N05	Bukit Kayu Hitam	Ahmad Zaini Japar (BN)	Ahmad Zaini Japar	UMNO	Halimahton Shaadiah Saad	Bersatu	Habshah Bakar	PAS	—N/a	—N/a
N06	Jitra	Aminuddin Omar (BN)	Aminuddin Omar	UMNO	Mukhriz Mahathir	Bersatu	Zulhazmi Othman	PAS	—N/a	—N/a
N07	Kuala Nerang	Badrol Hisham Hashim (BN)	Badrol Hisham Hashim	UMNO	Syed Fadzil Syed Embun	Bersatu	Munir @ Mohamad Yusuf Zakaria	PAS	—N/a	—N/a
N08	Pedu	Kama Noriah Ibrahim (BN)	Kama Noriah Ibrahim	UMNO	Hashim Idris	PKR	Mohd Radzi Md Amin	PAS	—N/a	—N/a
N09	Bukit Lada	Ahmad Lebai Sudin (BN)	Ariffin Man	UMNO	Mohd Aizad bin Roslan	Bersatu	Salim Mahmood	PAS	Ismail Othman	IND
N10	Bukit Pinang	Wan Romani Wan Salim (GS)	Mohammad Nawar Ariffin	UMNO	Che Mat Dzaher Ahmad	PKR	Wan Romani Wan Salim	PAS	—N/a	—N/a
N11	Derga	Tan Kok Yew (PH)	Cheah Soon Hai	Gerakan	Tan Kok Yew	DAP	Yahya Saad	PAS	—N/a	—N/a
N12	Suka Menanti (previously known as Bakar Bata)	Ahmad Bashah Md Hanipah (BN)	Ahmad Bashah Md Hanipah	UMNO	Zamri Yusuf	PKR	Mohd Sabri Omar	PAS	—N/a	—N/a
N13	Kota Darul Aman	Teoh Boon Kok @ Teoh Kai Kok (PH)	Tan Eng Hwa	MCA	Teh Swee Leong	DAP	Zulkifli Che Haron	PAS	Tan Kang Yap	PRM
N14	Alor Mengkudu	Ahmad Saad @ Yahaya (GS)	Abdul Malik Saad	UMNO	Phahrolrazi Mohd Zawawi	Amanah	Ahmad Yahya	PAS	—N/a	—N/a
N15	Anak Bukit	Amiruddin Hamzah (PH)	Johari Aziz	UMNO	Amiruddin Hamzah	Bersatu	Hamdi Ishak	PAS	—N/a	—N/a
N16	Kubang Rotan	Mohd Nasir Mustafa (GS)	Abdul Muthalib Harun	UMNO	Mohd Asmirul Anuar Aris	Amanah	Omar Saad	PAS	—N/a	—N/a
N17	Pengkalan Kundor	Phahrolrazi Zawawi (PH)	Abd. Halim Said	UMNO	Ismail Salleh	Amanah	Ahmad Fakhruddin Sheikh Fakhrurazi	PAS	—N/a	—N/a
N18	Tokai	Mohamed Taulan Mat Rasul (GS)	Fatahi Omar	UMNO	Mohd Firdaus Jaafar	Amanah	Mohd Hayati Othman	PAS	—N/a	—N/a
N19	Sungai Tiang	Suraya Yaacob (BN)	Suraya Yaacob	UMNO	Abdul Razak Khamis	Bersatu	Saiful Syazwan Shafie	PAS	—N/a	—N/a
N20	Sungai Limau	Mohd Azam Samat (GS)	Norma Awang	UMNO	Zahran Abdullah	Amanah	Mohd Azam Abd Samat	PAS	—N/a	—N/a
N21	Guar Chempedak	Ku Abdul Rahman Ku Ismail (BN)	Ku Abdul Rahman Ku Ismail	UMNO	Mohd Saffuan Sabari	Bersatu	Musoddak Ahmad	PAS	—N/a	—N/a
N22	Gurun	Leong Yong Kong (BN)	Boey Chin Gan	MCA	Johari Abdul	PKR	Muzaini Azizan	PAS	Palaniappan Marimuthu	IND
N23	Belantek	Mohd Tajudin Abdullah (BN)	Mohd Tajudin Abdullah	UMNO	Abdul Rashid Abdullah	Amanah	Mad Isa Shafie	PAS	—N/a	—N/a
N24	Jeneri	Mahadzir Abdul Hamid (BN)	Mahadzir Abdul Hamid	UMNO	Mohd Nazri bin Abu Hassan	Bersatu	Muhammad Sanusi Md Nor	PAS	—N/a	—N/a
N25	Bukit Selambau	Krishnamoorthy Rajannaidu (PH)	Jaspal Singh Gurbakhes Singh	MIC	Summugam Rengasamy	PKR	Mohd Ali Sulaiman	PAS	—N/a	—N/a
N26	Tanjong Dawai	Tajul Urus Mat Zain (BN)	Anuar Ahmad	UMNO	Annuar Abd Hamid	Bersatu	Hanif Ghazali	PAS	—N/a	—N/a
N27	Pantai Merdeka	Ali Yahaya (BN)	Ali Yahaya	UMNO	Rosli Yusof	Amanah	Ahmad Fadzli Hashim	PAS	—N/a	—N/a
N28	Bakar Arang	Ooi Tze Min (PH)	Ko Hung Weng	MCA	Ooi Tze Min	PKR	Othman Che Mee	PAS	Tan Khee Chye	PRM
N28	Bakar Arang	Ooi Tze Min (PH)	Ko Hung Weng	MCA	Ooi Tze Min	PKR	Othman Che Mee	PAS	Tan Hock Huat	IND
N29	Sidam	Robert Ling Kui Ee (PH)	Tan Kok Seong	Gerakan	Robert Ling Kui Ee	PKR	Norhidayah Foo Abdullah	PAS	Mohd Hashim Saaludin	PRM
N30	Bayu	Azmi Che Husain (BN)	Mohamed Noor Mohamed Amin	UMNO	Abd Rahim Kechik	Bersatu	Abd Nasir Idris	PAS	—N/a	—N/a
N31	Kupang	Harun Abdul Aziz (BN)	Harun Abdul Aziz	UMNO	Johari Abdullah	Amanah	Najmi Ahmad	PAS	—N/a	—N/a
N32	Kuala Ketil	Md Zuki Yusof (GS)	Mohd. Khairul Abdullah	UMNO	Mohamad Sofee Razak	PKR	Mansor Zakaria	PAS	—N/a	—N/a
N33	Merbau Pulas	Siti Aishah Ghazali (GS)	Asmadi Abu Talib	UMNO	Abd. Razak Salleh	Amanah	Siti Aishah Ghazali	PAS	—N/a	—N/a
N34	Lunas	Azman Nasrudin (PH)	Thuraisingam K.S. Muthu	MIC	Azman Nasrudin	PKR	Ahmad Taufiq Baharum	PAS	—N/a	—N/a
N35	Kulim	Chua Thiong Gee (BN)	Chua Thiong Gee	MCA	Yeo Keng Chuan	PKR	Mohd Khairi Mohd Salleh	PAS	Lee Ah Liong	PRM
N36	Bandar Baharu	Norsabrina Mohd Noor (BN)	Norsabrina Mohd Noor	UMNO	Azimi Daim	Bersatu	Rohaizat Ja'afar	PAS	—N/a	—N/a

== Election pendulum ==
The 14th General Election witnessed 18 governmental seats and 18 non-governmental seats filled the Kedah State Legislative Assembly. The government side has 1 safe seat and 3 fairly safe seats. However, none of the non-government side has safe and fairly safe seat.

2018 Kedah state election

GOVERNMENT SEATS
Marginal
Kota Siputeh	Salmee Said	AMANAH	38.52
Alor Mengkudu	Phahrolrazi Zawawi	AMANAH	39.75
Kulim	Yeo Keng Chuan	PKR	41.55
Bukit Kayu Hitam	Halimahton Shaadiah Saad	BERSATU	41.72
Anak Bukit	Ir. Amiruddin Hamzah	BERSATU	42.21
Pengkalan Kundor	Dr. Ismail Salleh	AMANAH	42.58
Ayer Hangat	Johari Bulat	BERSATU	42.89
Bukit Selambau	Summugam Rengasamy	PKR	45.11
Gurun	Johari Abdul	PKR	47.32
Kubang Rotan	Mohd. Asmirul Anuar Aris	AMANAH	48.67
Kuah	Mohd. Firdaus Ahmad	BERSATU	49.05
Derga	Tan Kok Yew	DAP	50.79
Suka Menanti	Zamri Yusuf	PKR	53.35
Jitra	Mukhriz Dr. Mahathir	BERSATU	55.58
Fairly safe
Lunas	Azman Nasrudin	PKR	57.62
Sidam	Robert Ling Kui Ee	PKR	58.09
Bakar Arang	Simon Ooi Tze Min	PKR	58.21
Safe
Kota Darul Aman	Teh Swee Leong	DAP	69.99

NON-GOVERNMENT SEATS
Marginal
Bandar Baharu	Norsabrina Mohd. Noor	UMNO	34.43
Merbau Pulas	Siti Aishah Ghazali	PAS	34.57
Guar Chempedak	Dr. Ku Abdul Rahman Ku Ismail	UMNO	35.30
Tanjong Dawai	Hanif Ghazali	PAS	35.37
Ayer Hitam	Azhar Ibrahim	PAS	36.71
Sungai Tiang	Suraya Yaacob	UMNO	38.39
Bukit Lada	Salim Mahmood	PAS	38.85
Pedu	Mohd. Radzi Md. Amin	PAS	43.13
Bukit Pinang	Wan Romani Wan Salim	PAS	43.57
Bayu	Abd. Nasir Idris	PAS	43.70
Kuala Ketil	Mansor Zakaria	PAS	44.09
Kuala Nerang	Mohamad Yusoff Zakaria	PAS	45.61
Pantai Merdeka	Ahmad Fadzli Hashim	PAS	45.62
Kupang	Najmi Ahmad	PAS	45.64
Jeneri	Muhammad Sanusi Md. Nor	PAS	46.31
Belantek	Mad Isa Shafie	PAS	50.52
Tokai	Dr. Mohd. Hayati Othman	PAS	52.33
Sungai Limau	Mohd. Azam Abd. Samat	PAS	53.01

== Results ==
Party or alliance		Votes	%	Seats	+/–
Pakatan Harapan	People's Justice Party	143,812	15.29	7	+3
Pakatan Harapan	Malaysian United Indigenous Party	114,838	12.21	5	New
Pakatan Harapan	National Trust Party	61,900	6.58	4	New
Pakatan Harapan	Democratic Action Party	22,969	2.44	2	–
Pakatan Harapan	Total	343,519	36.53	18	+12
Gagasan Sejahtera	Pan-Malaysian Islamic Party	317,171	33.73	15	+6
Barisan Nasional	United Malays National Organisation	226,273	24.06	3	–16
Barisan Nasional	Malaysian Chinese Association	24,616	2.62	0	–2
Barisan Nasional	Malaysian Indian Congress	16,938	1.80	0	0
Barisan Nasional	Parti Gerakan Rakyat Malaysia	10,867	1.16	0	0
Barisan Nasional	Total	278,694	29.64	3	–18
Parti Rakyat Malaysia		204	0.02	0	0
Independents		726	0.08	0	0
Total		940,314	100.00	36	0
Valid votes		940,314	98.56		
Invalid/blank votes		13,725	1.44		
Total votes		954,039	100.00		
Registered voters/turnout		1,146,492	83.21		
Source: Malaysiakini

=== By parliamentary constituency ===
Pakatan Harapan won 9 of 15 parliamentary constituency.

No.	Constituency	Barisan Nasional	Gagasan Sejahtera	Pakatan Harapan	Member of Parliament
P004	Langkawi	34.35%	19.49%	45.91%	
P004	Langkawi	34.35%	19.49%	45.91%	Nawawi Ahmad (13th Parliament)
P004	Langkawi	34.35%	19.49%	45.91%	Mahathir Mohamad (14th Parliament)
P005	Jerlun	29.58%	34.15%	36.27%	
P005	Jerlun	29.58%	34.15%	36.27%	Othman Aziz (13th Parliament)
P005	Jerlun	29.58%	34.15%	36.27%	Mukhriz Mahathir (14th Parliament)
P006	Kubang Pasu	27.97%	22.52%	49.51%	Mohd Johari Baharum (13th Parliament)
P006	Kubang Pasu	27.97%	22.52%	49.51%	Amiruddin Hamzah (14th Parliament)
P007	Padang Terap	38.52%	44.40%	17.08%	Mahdzir Khalid
P008	Pokok Sena	27.57%	36.74%	35.06%	Mahfuz Omar
P009	Alor Setar	26.21%	20.77%	53.02%	
P009	Alor Setar	26.21%	20.77%	53.02%	Gooi Hsiao-Leung (13th Parliament)
P009	Alor Setar	26.21%	20.77%	53.02%	Chan Ming Kai (14th Parliament)
P010	Kuala Kedah	24.23%	31.09%	44.68%	Azman Ismail
P011	Pendang	32.28%	44.18%	23.54%	
P011	Pendang	32.28%	44.18%	23.54%	Othman Abdul (13th Parliament)
P011	Pendang	32.28%	44.18%	23.54%	Awang Hashim (14th Parliament)
P012	Jerai	30.59%	37.36%	31.80%	Jamil Khir Baharom (13th Parliament)
P012	Jerai	30.59%	37.36%	31.80%	Sabri Azit (14th Parliament)
P013	Sik	36.23%	48.22%	15.55%	Mansor Abd Rahman (13th Parliament)
P013	Sik	36.23%	48.22%	15.55%	Ahmad Tarmizi Sulaiman (14th Parliament)
P014	Merbok	27.86%	32.79%	39.35%	Ismail Daut (13th Parliament)
P014	Merbok	27.86%	32.79%	39.35%	Nor Azrina Surip (14th Parliament)
P015	Sungai Petani	22.77%	30.50%	46.55%	Johari Abdul
P016	Baling	39.87%	44.45%	15.68%	Abdul Azeez Abdul Rahim
P017	Padang Serai	24.17%	28.51%	47.32%	
P017	Padang Serai	24.17%	28.51%	47.32%	Surendran Nagarajan (13th Parliament)
P017	Padang Serai	24.17%	28.51%	47.32%	Karuppaiya Muthusamy (14th Parliament)
P018	Kulim-Bandar Baharu	31.57%	31.01%	37.36%	Abd. Aziz Sheikh Fadzir (13th Parliament)
P018	Kulim-Bandar Baharu	31.57%	31.01%	37.36%	Saifuddin Nasution Ismail (14th Parliament)

=== Seats that changed allegiance ===
No.	Seat	Previous Party (2013)	Current Party (2018)
N01	(Kedah) Ayer Hangat	Barisan Nasional (UMNO)	Pakatan Harapan (BERSATU)
N02	(Kedah) Kuah	Barisan Nasional (UMNO)	Pakatan Harapan (BERSATU)
N03	(Kedah) Kota Siputeh	Barisan Nasional (UMNO)	Pakatan Harapan (AMANAH)
N04	(Kedah) Ayer Hitam	Barisan Nasional (UMNO)	Gagasan Sejahtera (PAS)
N05	(Kedah) Bukit Kayu Hitam	Barisan Nasional (UMNO)	Pakatan Harapan (BERSATU)
N06	(Kedah) Jitra	Barisan Nasional (UMNO)	Pakatan Harapan (BERSATU)
N07	(Kedah) Kuala Nerang	Barisan Nasional (UMNO)	Gagasan Sejahtera (PAS)
N08	(Kedah) Pedu	Barisan Nasional (UMNO)	Gagasan Sejahtera (PAS)
N09	(Kedah) Bukit Lada	Barisan Nasional (UMNO)	Gagasan Sejahtera (PAS)
N12	(Kedah) Suka Menanti	Barisan Nasional (UMNO)	Pakatan Harapan (PKR)
N14	(Kedah) Alor Mengkudu	Gagasan Sejahtera (PAS)	Pakatan Harapan (AMANAH)
N15	(Kedah) Anak Bukit	Gagasan Sejahtera (PAS)	Pakatan Harapan (BERSATU)
N16	(Kedah) Kubang Rotan	Gagasan Sejahtera (PAS)	Pakatan Harapan (AMANAH)
N17	(Kedah) Pengkalan Kundor	Gagasan Sejahtera (PAS)	Pakatan Harapan (AMANAH)
N22	(Kedah) Gurun	Barisan Nasional (MCA)	Pakatan Harapan (PKR)
N23	(Kedah) Belantek	Barisan Nasional (UMNO)	Gagasan Sejahtera (PAS)
N24	(Kedah) Jeneri	Barisan Nasional (UMNO)	Gagasan Sejahtera (PAS)
N26	(Kedah) Tanjong Dawai	Barisan Nasional (UMNO)	Gagasan Sejahtera (PAS)
N27	(Kedah) Pantai Merdeka	Barisan Nasional (UMNO)	Gagasan Sejahtera (PAS)
N30	(Kedah) Bayu	Barisan Nasional (UMNO)	Gagasan Sejahtera (PAS)
N31	(Kedah) Kupang	Barisan Nasional (UMNO)	Gagasan Sejahtera (PAS)
N35	(Kedah) Kulim	Barisan Nasional (MCA)	Pakatan Harapan (PKR)

== Aftermath ==
Pakatan Harapan contest in Kedah for the first time using one of its component party logo, PKR. As the result, PH was able to wrest half of the 36 state seats, comprising most of the mixed seats including Malay/Muslim majority seats in the urban and semi-urban areas, as well as the only single Chinese-majority state seats of Kota Darul Aman that was retained by its other component party, DAP since 2008.

Meanwhile, the Malaysian Islamic Party (PAS) that was formerly established its new state government for the first time for a term between 2008 and 2013 via Pakatan Rakyat (PR, together with PKR and DAP on that time), was seen its influence again by dominating in predominantly Malay/Muslim majority seats (which was mainly in rural areas) despite gaining only 15 seats, additional another 6 seats compared to the previous election (9 seats). At the same time, it was the shock defeat for Barisan Nasional (BN), especially UMNO where it manage to retain just 3 seats compared to 21 seats in the previous state election (all the 3 seats was only retained by UMNO). Its other party component, MCA took no seats after the party lost in both seats of Gurun and Kulim to PH (PKR) candidates. Kedah BN leader, UMNO state chairman and previous Menteri Besar Ahmad Bashah said that his party accepted their defeat to PH and honoured the people's mandate in the election. An UMNO MLA for Guar Chempedak, Ku Abdul Rahman Ku Ismail, on 12 November 2018 announced his resignation from UMNO and BN to support PH, and later joined BERSATU. This made PH held 19 seats, enough for a simple majority in the Assembly.

The Pakatan Harapan state government led by Mukhriz however only lasts for 25 months, when in the wake of 2020 Malaysian political crisis, exit of Bersatu MLAs from PH and defection of support from ex-PH members turned independent, resulted in Mukhriz resignation as Menteri Besar. A new state government was formed in a coalition between BN (UMNO), Perikatan Nasional (Bersatu and PAS) and independent (ex-PKR) MLAs, with Sanusi Mohd Nor from PAS appointed as the new Menteri Besar on 17 May 2020. Mukhriz and Amiruddin Hamzah was later sacked from Bersatu on 28 May 2020, and they formed a new political party, PEJUANG on August that same year with other ex-Bersatu members.
