= Bukit Lada =

Political subdivision in Malaysia

Bukit Lada (N09)
Kedah constituency

State constituency
- Legislature: Kedah State Legislative Assembly
MLA
Salim Mahmood Al-Hafiz
PN
- Constituency created: 1994
- First contested: 1995
- Last contested: 2023

Demographics
- Electors (2023): 40,729

Bukit Lada is a state constituency in Kedah, Malaysia, that is represented in the Kedah State Legislative Assembly.

== Demographics ==
As of 2020, Bukit Lada has a population of 47,584 people.

Ethnic breakdown of Bukit Lada's electorate as of 2023
1. Malay (90.0%)
2. Chinese (7.09%)
3. Indian (1.87%)
4. Other ethnicities (1.05%)

== History ==
=== Polling districts ===
According to the gazette issued on 30 March 2018, the Bukit Lada constituency has a total of 22 polling districts.

| State constituency | Polling districts | Code | Location |
|---|---|---|---|
| Bukit Lada (N09） | Kedundong | 008/09/01 | Taman Bimbingan Kanak-Kanak Kg. Kedundong |
| Bukit Lada (N09） | Derang | 008/09/02 | SK Bukit Hijau |
| Bukit Lada (N09） | Kampung Kejal | 008/09/03 | SK Bukit Tampoi |
| Bukit Lada (N09） | Gajah Mati | 008/09/04 | SK Bukit Pak Kiau |
| Bukit Lada (N09） | Bukit Larek | 008/09/05 | SM Sains Pokok Sena |
| Bukit Lada (N09） | Pekan Bharu Pokok Sena | 008/09/06 | SK Pokok Sena |
| Bukit Lada (N09） | Pekan Lama Pokok Sena | 008/09/07 | SMK Pokok Sena |
| Bukit Lada (N09） | Kampung Kolon | 008/09/08 | SJK (T) Ladang Jabi |
| Bukit Lada (N09） | Jabi | 008/09/09 | SK Jabi |
| Bukit Lada (N09） | Telaga Mas | 008/09/10 | SK Telaga Mas |
| Bukit Lada (N09） | Tanjong Musang | 008/09/11 | SMK Jabi |
| Bukit Lada (N09） | Kebun 500 | 008/09/12 | SJK (C) Chung Hwa |
| Bukit Lada (N09） | Kepala Bendang | 008/09/13 | Tabika KEMAS Kampung Kolam |
| Bukit Lada (N09） | Kampung Menerong | 008/09/14 | SK Wan Abdul Samad |
| Bukit Lada (N09） | Kampung Padang | 008/09/15 | Tabika KEMAS Kampung Padang |
| Bukit Lada (N09） | Kampung Paya | 008/09/16 | SK Kg Paya |
| Bukit Lada (N09） | Kampung Nawa | 008/09/17 | SK Nawa |
| Bukit Lada (N09） | Bukit Payong | 008/09/18 | SK Bukit Payong |
| Bukit Lada (N09） | Kubang Leret | 008/09/19 | SK Kubang Leret |
| Bukit Lada (N09） | Kampung Bukit | 008/09/20 | SK Kampong Bukit |
| Bukit Lada (N09） | Kuala Lanjut | 008/09/21 | SK Kuala Lanjut |
| Bukit Lada (N09） | Kampung Panchor | 008/09/22 | Taman Bimbingan Kanak-Kanak Kg. Panchor |

=== Representation history ===
Kedah State Legislative Assemblyman for Bukit Lada
| Assembly | No | Years | Member | Party |
Constituency created from Pokok Sena
| 9th | N09 | 1995–1999 | Ahmad Sudin | BN (UMNO) |
| 10th | N09 | 1999–2004 | Sheikh Ismail Kamis | PAS |
| 11th | N09 | 2004–2008 | Ariffin Man | BN (UMNO) |
| 12th | N09 | 2008–2013 | Ahmad Izzat Mohamad Shauki | PR (PAS) |
| 13th | N09 | 2013–2018 | Ahmad Sudin | BN (UMNO) |
| 14th | N09 | 2018–2020 | Salim Mahmood Al-Hafiz | PAS |
| 14th | N09 | 2020–2023 | Salim Mahmood Al-Hafiz | PN (PAS) |
| 15th | N09 | 2023–present | Salim Mahmood Al-Hafiz | PN (PAS) |

== Election results ==
Kedah state election, 2023: Bukit Lada
| Party | Candidate | Votes | % | ∆% |
|---|---|---|---|---|
| PN | Salim Mahmood Al-Hafiz | 24,183 | 78.12 | ▲78.12 |
| BN | Syed Ali Syed Rastan | 6,772 | 21.88 | ▼11.75 |
| Total valid votes | | 30,955 | 100.00 | |
| Total rejected ballots | | 196 | | |
| Unreturned ballots | | 33 | | |
| Turnout | | 31,184 | 76.56 | ▼7.34 |
| Registered electors | | 40,729 | | |
| Majority | | 17,411 | 56.24 | ▲51.02 |
| PN hold | | Swing | | |

Kedah state election, 2018: Bukit Lada
| Party | Candidate | Votes | % | ∆% |
|---|---|---|---|---|
| PAS | Salim Mahmood Al-Hafiz | 9,573 | 38.85 | ▼8.39 |
| BN | Ariffin Man | 8,288 | 33.63 | ▼19.13 |
| PKR | Mohd Aizad Roslan | 6,337 | 25.72 | ▲25.72 |
| Independent | Mohd Ismail Othman | 444 | 1.80 | ▲1.80 |
| Total valid votes | | 24,642 | 100.00 | |
| Total rejected ballots | | 446 | | |
| Unreturned ballots | | 0 | | |
| Turnout | | 25,165 | 83.90 | ▼5.00 |
| Registered electors | | 30,002 | | |
| Majority | | 1,285 | 5.22 | ▼0.30 |
| PAS gain from BN | | Swing | | ? |

Kedah state election, 2013: Bukit Lada
| Party | Candidate | Votes | % | ∆% |
|---|---|---|---|---|
| BN | Ahmad Sudin | 12,664 | 52.76 | ▲3.31 |
| PAS | Ahmad Izzat Mohamad Shauki | 11,340 | 47.24 | ▼3.31 |
| Total valid votes | | 24,004 | 100.00 | |
| Total rejected ballots | | 459 | | |
| Unreturned ballots | | 58 | | |
| Turnout | | 24,521 | 88.90 | ▲5.72 |
| Registered electors | | 27,593 | | |
| Majority | | 1,324 | 5.52 | ▲4.42 |
| BN gain from PAS | | Swing | | ? |

Kedah state election, 2008: Bukit Lada
| Party | Candidate | Votes | % | ∆% |
|---|---|---|---|---|
| PAS | Ahmad Izzat Mohamad Shauki | 9,600 | 50.55 | ▲8.02 |
| BN | Syeikh Alias Mustafa | 9,392 | 49.45 | ▼8.02 |
| Total valid votes | | 18,992 | 100.00 | |
| Total rejected ballots | | 395 | | |
| Unreturned ballots | | 47 | | |
| Turnout | | 19,434 | 83.18 | ▼1.72 |
| Registered electors | | 23,365 | | |
| Majority | | 208 | 1.10 | ▼13.84 |
| PAS gain from BN | | Swing | | ? |

Kedah state election, 2004: Bukit Lada
| Party | Candidate | Votes | % | ∆% |
|---|---|---|---|---|
| BN | Ariffin Man | 10,656 | 57.47 | ▲9.85 |
| PAS | Sheikh Ismail Kamis | 7,887 | 42.53 | ▼9.85 |
| Total valid votes | | 18,453 | 100.00 | |
| Total rejected ballots | | 305 | | |
| Unreturned ballots | | 0 | | |
| Turnout | | 18,848 | 84.90 | ▲5.93 |
| Registered electors | | 22,201 | | |
| Majority | | 2,769 | 14.94 | ▲10.18 |
| BN gain from PAS | | Swing | | ? |

Kedah state election, 1999: Bukit Lada
| Party | Candidate | Votes | % | ∆% |
|---|---|---|---|---|
| PAS | Sheikh Ismail Kamis | 9,368 | 52.38 | ▲8.55 |
| BN | Abdul Hadi Derani | 8,516 | 47.62 | ▼8.44 |
| Total valid votes | | 17,884 | 100.00 | |
| Total rejected ballots | | 407 | | |
| Unreturned ballots | | 19 | | |
| Turnout | | 18,310 | 78.97 | ▲2.55 |
| Registered electors | | 23,187 | | |
| Majority | | 852 | 4.76 | ▼7.36 |
| PAS gain from BN | | Swing | | ? |

Kedah state election, 1995: Bukit Lada
| Party | Candidate | Votes | % |
|---|---|---|---|
| BN | Ahmad Sudin | 9,189 | 56.06 |
| PAS | Mahmud @ Mohamood Che Mat @ Hj Ahmad | 7,201 | 43.94 |
| Total valid votes | | 16,390 | 100.00 |
| Total rejected ballots | | 388 | |
| Unreturned ballots | | 31 | |
| Turnout | | 16,808 | 76.42 |
| Registered electors | | 21,995 | |
| Majority | | 1,988 | 12.12 |
This was a new constituency created.
