= Mahfuz Omar =

Malaysian politician (born 1957)

Yang Berbahagia Dato' Wira Mahfuz Omar DGMK DSDK
- محفوظ عمر
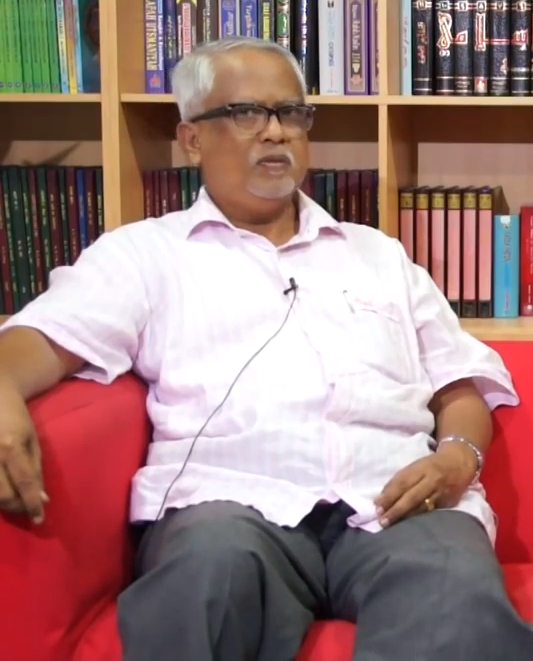
- Mahfuz Omar in 2013

Chairman of the Farmers' Organisation Authority
- Incumbent
- Assumed office 15 May 2023
- Minister: Mohamad Sabu
- Director-General: Amir Matamin
- Preceded by: Che Abdullah Mat Nawi

Deputy Minister of Human Resources
- In office 2 July 2018 – 24 February 2020
- Monarchs: Muhammad V (2018–2019); Abdullah (2019–2020)
- Prime Minister: Mahathir Mohamad
- Minister: M. Kulasegaran
- Preceded by: Ismail Abdul Muttalib
- Succeeded by: Awang Hashim
- Constituency: Pokok Sena

Vice President of the National Trust Party
- Incumbent
- Assumed office 5 September 2021 Serving with Mujahid Yusof Rawa (2021–2023) & Hasanuddin Mohd Yunus (2021–2023) & Siti Mariah Mahmud (since 2021) & Adly Zahari (since 2021); Dzulkefly Ahmad (since 2023); Mohd Hatta Ramli (since 2024)
- President: Mohamad Sabu

State Chairman of the Pakatan Harapan of Kedah
- In office 2022 – 7 February 2025
- President: Wan Azizah Wan Ismail
- National Chairman: Anwar Ibrahim
- Succeeded by: Saifuddin Nasution Ismail

Member of the Malaysian Parliament for Pokok Sena
- In office 8 March 2008 – 19 November 2022
- Preceded by: Abdul Rahman Ibrahim (BN–UMNO)
- Succeeded by: Ahmad Yahaya (PN–PAS)
- Majority: 5,731 (2008); 3,935 (2013); 5,558 (2018)
- In office 29 November 1999 – 21 March 2004
- Preceded by: Wan Hanafiah Wan Mat Saman (BN–UMNO)
- Succeeded by: Abdul Rahman Ibrahim (BN–UMNO)
- Majority: 3,637 (1999)

Personal details
- Born: Mahfuz bin Omar; 25 August 1957 (age 68) Kedah, Federation of Malaya (now Malaysia)
- Citizenship: Malaysia
- Party: Malaysian Islamic Party (PAS) (1984–2017); National Trust Party (AMANAH) (since 2018)
- Other political affiliations: Angkatan Perpaduan Ummah (APU) (1990–1996); Barisan Alternatif (BA) (1999–2004); Pakatan Rakyat (PR) (2008–2015); Gagasan Sejahtera (GS) (2016–2017); Pakatan Harapan (PH) (since 2018)
- Spouse: Ruswati Jaafar
- Children: 3
- Occupation: Politician
- Website: gemasuara.blogspot.com
- Mahfuz Omar on Parliament of Malaysia

Mahfuz bin Omar (Jawi: محفوظ بن عمر; born 25 August 1957) is a Malaysian politician who has served as Chairman of the Farmers' Organisation Authority (FOA) since May 2023. He served as the Deputy Minister of Human Resources in the Pakatan Harapan (PH) administration under former Prime Minister Mahathir Mohamad and former Minister M. Kulasegaran from July 2018 to the collapse of the PH administration in February 2020 as well as the Member of Parliament (MP) for Pokok Sena from November 1999 to March 2004 and again from March 2008 to November 2022. He is a member of the National Trust Party (AMANAH), a component party of the PH coalition and was a member of the Malaysian Islamic Party (PAS), then a component party of formerly the Gagasan Sejahtera (GS), Pakatan Rakyat (PR), Barisan Alternatif (BA) and Angkatan Perpaduan Ummah (APU) coalitions. He has also served as the Vice President of AMANAH since September 2021. He served as the State Chairman of PH of Kedah from 2022 to February 2025.

== Political career ==
Mahfuz was the head of Malaysian Islamic Party (PAS) youth wing from 1999 to 2003. Under his leadership, PAS Youth was a progressive voice within PAS, advocating for the party to join the Barisan Alternatif coalition with the Democratic Action Party (DAP) and the People's Justice Party (PKR). Mahfuz's leadership of PAS was the culmination of a long period of his activism within the party. He and a group of other PAS politicians were detained under the Internal Security Act in 1985, a period of intense and often violent hostility between PAS and the governing United Malays National Organisation (UMNO). He was briefly jailed again in 2000 for participating in an unauthorised protest rally against an Israeli cricket team visiting Malaysia.

Mahfuz was elected to Parliament in 1999 but was defeated in the 2004 election by Abdul Rahman Ibrahim of the governing Barisan Nasional coalition. Mahfuz won back the seat at the 2008 election with a majority of 5,371 votes. He was re-elected in 2013, while all other PAS parliamentary candidates in Kedah were defeated.

On 30 December 2017, Mahfuz had announced his decision to quit PAS which he had joined 34 years ago on 12 March 1984. On 15 March 2018, Mahfuz declared he had joined AMANAH, a splinter party of PAS.

In the 2018 general election, Mahfuz again retained the Pokok Sena seat but as the AMANAH of Pakatan Harapan candidate for the first time.

== Election results ==
Penang State Legislative Assembly
Year	Constituency	Candidate	Votes	Pct	Opponent(s)	Votes	Pct	Ballots cast	Majority	Turnout
1986	N01 Penaga	Mahfuz Omar (PAS)	2,312	35.65%	Abdul Razak Ismail (UMNO)	4,174	64.35%	6,738	1,862	75.71%

Parliament of Malaysia
Year	Constituency	Candidate	Votes	Pct	Opponent(s)	Votes	Pct	Ballots cast	Majority	Turnout
1990	P041 Permatang Pauh	Mahfuz Omar (PAS)	7,643	24.31%	Anwar Ibrahim (UMNO)	23,793	75.69%	31,740	16,150	78.32%
1995	P008 Pokok Sena	Mahfuz Omar (PAS)	20,667	44.98%	Wan Hanafiah Wan Mat Saman (UMNO)	25,285	55.02%	49,494	4,618	77.45%
1999	P008 Pokok Sena	Mahfuz Omar (PAS)	27,466	53.55%	Wan Hanafiah Wan Mat Saman (UMNO)	23,829	46.45%	52,779	3,637	77.47%
2004	P008 Pokok Sena	Mahfuz Omar (PAS)	22,440	43.00%	Abdul Rahman Ibrahim (UMNO)	29,740	57.00%	53,035	7,300	80.27%
2008	P008 Pokok Sena	Mahfuz Omar (PAS)	29,687	55.34%	Abdul Rahman Ibrahim (UMNO)	23,956	44.66%	55,318	5,731	79.44%
2013	P008 Pokok Sena	Mahfuz Omar (PAS)	36,198	52.87%	Shahlan Ismail (UMNO)	32,263	47.13%	69,524	3,935	86.14%
2018	P008 Pokok Sena	Mahfuz Omar (AMANAH)	28,959	40.93%	Muhamad Radhi Mat Din (PAS)	23,401	33.08%	71,910	5,558	82.76%
2018	P008 Pokok Sena	Mahfuz Omar (AMANAH)	28,959	40.93%	Said Ali Said Rastan (UMNO)	18,390	25.99%	71,910	5,558	82.76%
2022	P008 Pokok Sena	Mahfuz Omar (AMANAH)	20,524	23.34%	Ahmad Yahaya (PAS)	52,275	59.44%	88,976	31,751	76.58%
2022	P008 Pokok Sena	Mahfuz Omar (AMANAH)	20,524	23.34%	Noran Zamini Jamaluddin (UMNO)	14,523	16.51%	88,976	31,751	76.58%
2022	P008 Pokok Sena	Mahfuz Omar (AMANAH)	20,524	23.34%	Noraini Md Salleh (WARISAN)	622	0.71%	88,976	31,751	76.58%

Kedah State Legislative Assembly
Year	Constituency	Candidate	Votes	Pct	Opponent(s)	Votes	Pct	Ballots cast	Majority	Turnout
2023	N14 Alor Mengkudu	Mahfuz Omar (AMANAH)	8,832	31.81%	Muhamad Radhi Mat Din (PAS)	18,936	68.19%	27,885	10,104	72.70%

== Honours ==
- Kedah
  - Knight Commander of the Glorious Order of the Crown of Kedah (DGMK) – Dato' Wira (2019)
  - Knight Companion of the Order of Loyalty to the Royal House of Kedah (DSDK) – Dato' (2009)

== See also ==
- Pokok Sena (federal constituency)
