= 2025 Pan-Malaysian Islamic Party leadership election =

Election in a political party in Malaysia

2025 Pan-Malaysian Islamic Party Presidential election
← 2023	11–16 September 2025	2027 →
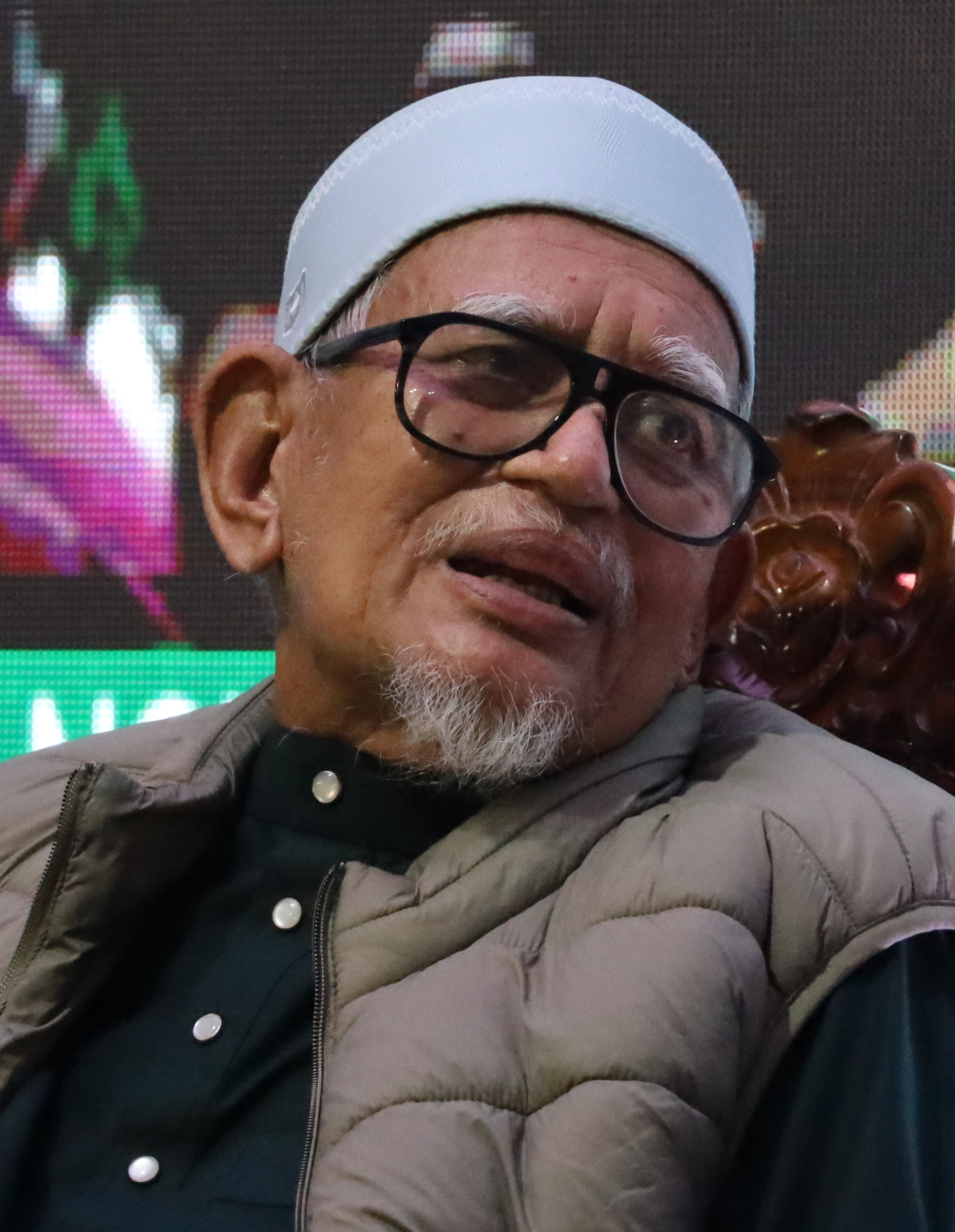
Candidate	Abdul Hadi Awang
Popular vote	Won uncontested
President of PAS before election
Abdul Hadi Awang
President of PAS after election
Abdul Hadi Awang

A leadership elections was held by the Pan-Malaysian Islamic Party (PAS) on 11 until 16 September 2025 to elect a new leadership at the central level. The elections was held at the PAS Kedah Complex, Alor Setar, Kedah, Malaysia.

2025 Pan-Malaysian Islamic Party Deputy Presidential election
← 2023	11–16 September 2025	2027 →
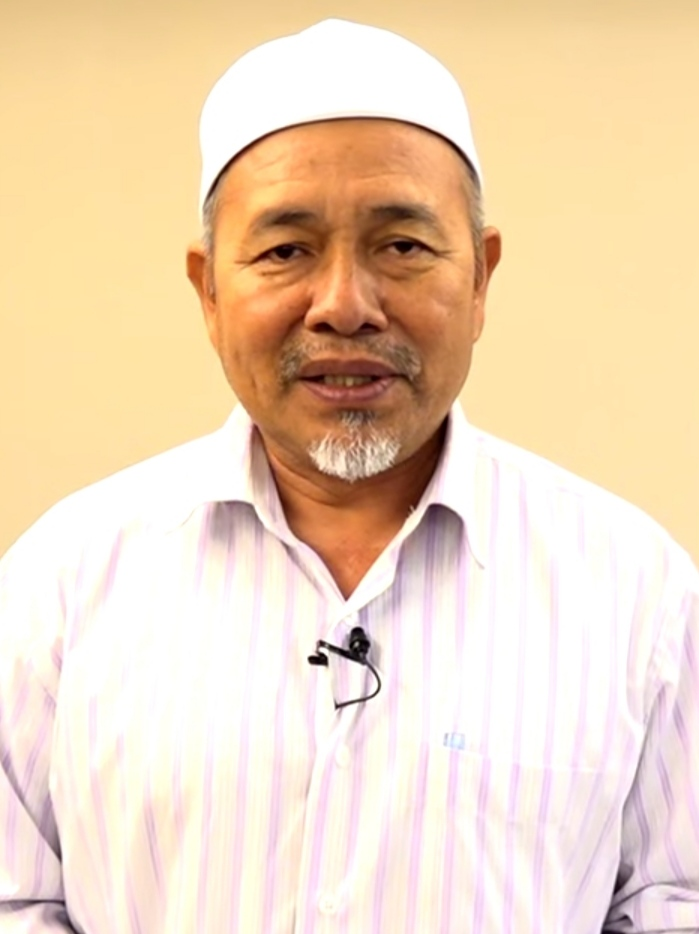
Candidate	Tuan Ibrahim Tuan Man
Popular vote	Won uncontested
Deputy President of PAS before election
Tuan Ibrahim Tuan Man
Deputy President of PAS after election
Tuan Ibrahim Tuan Man

The current incumbent PAS President and PAS Deputy President, Abdul Hadi Awang and Tuan Ibrahim Tuan Man respectively won unopposed after they were the only candidates for their respective positions to submit nomination forms.

== Timeline ==
=== September ===
11–16 September 2025: Leadership elections will be held for the positions of the Islamic Party of Malaysia (PAS) for the 2025/2027 session for the Central PAS Working Committee, the Central PAS Ulamak Council Working Committee, the Central PAS Youth Council Working Committee and the Central PAS Muslimat Council Working Committee.

== Controversies and issues ==
Muhammad Sanusi Md Nor, the current Menteri Besar of Kedah, said that they will not prevent any leader from contesting the president and deputy president's posts in the upcoming September party elections. He stated that all eligible members are welcome to contest the posts, but no one has offered themselves for the challenge in past elections.

== Nominations and results ==
=== President ===
Candidate	Delegates' votes
Abdul Hadi Awang	Won uncontested

=== Deputy President ===
Candidate	Delegates' votes
Tuan Ibrahim Tuan Man	Won uncontested

=== Vice-Presidents (3 persons) ===
Candidate	Delegates' votes
Ahmad Samsuri Mokhtar	Won uncontested
Idris Ahmad	Won uncontested
Mohd Amar Abdullah	Won uncontested
~~Muhammad Sanusi Md Nor~~	Withdraw

=== Auditors (2 persons) ===
Candidate	Delegates' votes
Abd Shukor Abd Aziz	Won uncontested
Najib Ahmad	Won uncontested

=== Central Working Committee Members (18 persons) ===
Candidate	Delegates' votes
Ahmad Fadhli Shaari	1,096
Muhammad Sanusi Md Nor	1,062
Haim Hilman Abdullah	1,028
Muhammad Khalil Abdul Hadi	1,018
Khairil Nizam Khirudin	920
Mohd Nassuruddin Daud	897
Azman Ibrahim	868
Halimah Ali	866
Siti Zailah Mohd Yusoff	865
Ahmad Marzuk Shaary	854
Ahmad Amzad Hashim @ Mohamad	802
Mohamed Fadzli Hassan	731
Riduan Mohamad Nor	721
Shahidan Kassim	717
Nik Mohamad Abduh Nik Abdul Aziz	713
Awang Solahuddin Hashim	688
Mumtaz Md Nawi	682
Iskandar Abdul Samad	680
Ab Halim Tamuri	Lost
Ahmad Fakhruddin Fakhrurazi	Lost
Ahmad Yunus Hairi	Lost
Aliakbar Gulasan	Lost
Annuar Musa	Lost
Bakri Jamaluddin	Lost
Kamaruzaman Mohamad	Lost
Misbahul Munir Masduki	Lost
Mohd Mazri Yahya	Lost
Mohd Shukri Ramli	Lost
Mohd Syahir Che Sulaiman	Lost
Mohd Yusni Mat Piah	Lost
Mohd Zuhdi Marzuki	Lost
Najihatussalehah Ahmad	Lost
Nasrudin Hassan	Lost
Nik Muhammad Zawawi Salleh	Lost
Razman Zakaria	Lost
Rosni Adam	Lost
Takiyuddin Hassan	Lost
Zulkifli Ismail	Lost

== See also ==
- 2023 Pan-Malaysian Islamic Party leadership election
