= 2021 Pan-Malaysian Islamic Party leadership election =

← 2019	6 November 2021	2023 →
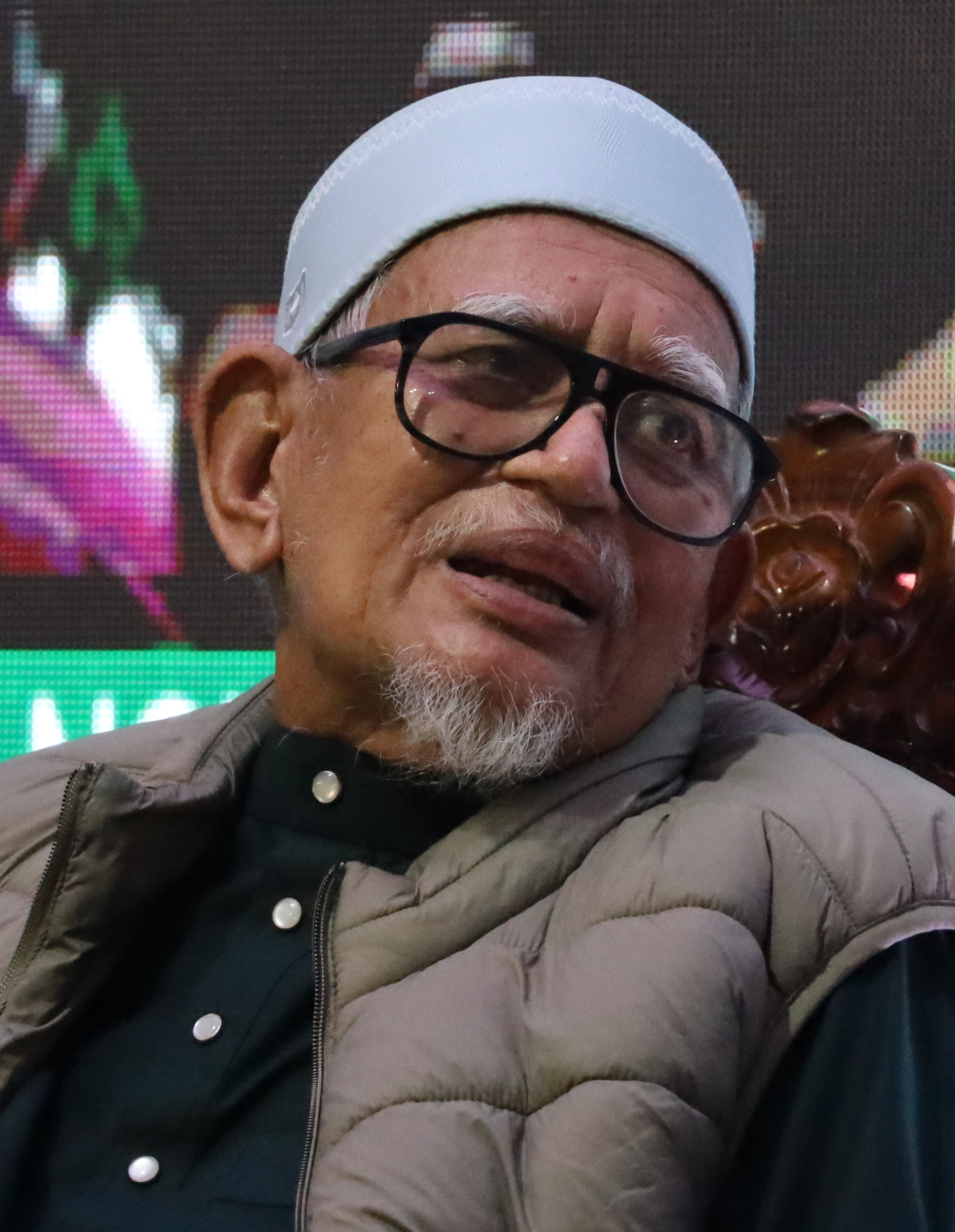
Candidate	Abdul Hadi Awang
Popular vote	Won uncontested
Presiden PAS before election
Abdul Hadi Awang
President of PAS
Abdul Hadi Awang

A leadership election was held by the Pan-Malaysian Islamic Party (PAS) on 6 and 7 November 2021. It was won by incumbent President of PAS, Abdul Hadi Awang.

== Timeline ==
=== October ===
- 21 October 2021: Announcement of the nomination of Dewan Pemuda and Dewan Muslimat
- 23 October 2021: Final confirmation of the nomination of Dewan Pemuda and Dewan Muslimat
- 30 – 31 October 2021: The annual conference of the Youth Council took place at Corus Paradise Resort, Negeri Sembilan.
- 30 – 31 October 2021: The annual muktamar of Dewan Muslimat took place at the PAS Headquarters, Kuala Lumpur
- 30 October 2021: The annual muktamar of Dewan Ulamak took place at the Tahfiz Darul Ulum Complex, Seremban, Negeri Sembilan.
- 30 October 2021: Youth Council voting dan Dewan Muslimat
- 31 October 2021: Announcement of Youth Council election results dan Dewan Muslimat.

=== November ===
- 4 November 2021: Announcement of PAS Central Committee election candidates
- 6 – 7 November 2021: PAS Annual General Meeting

== Central Working Committee election results ==
The following are the election results for the membership of the PAS Central Committee for the 2021-2023 session.

=== Permanent Chairman ===
Candidate	Delegates' votes	Notes
Hussin Ismail	won uncontested	

=== Deputy Permanent Chairman ===
Candidate	Delegates' votes	Notes
Kamal Ashaari	won uncontested	

=== Auditor ===
Candidate	Delegates' votes	Notes
Md Shukor Aziz	won uncontested	
Mohd Najib Ahmad	won uncontested	

=== President ===
Candidate	Delegates' votes	Notes
Abdul Hadi Awang	won uncontested	

=== Deputy President ===
Candidate	Delegates' votes	Notes
Tuan Ibrahim Tuan Man	won uncontested	

=== Vice Presidents ===
Candidate	Delegates' votes	Notes
Idris Ahmad	1,164	
Nik Mohd. Amar Nik Abdullah	956	
Ahmad Samsuri Mokhtar	778	
Mohd Zuhdi Marzuki	623	
Muhammad Sanusi Md Nor	Withdraw	

=== Central Working Committee Members ===
Candidate	Delegates' votes	Notes
Muhammad Khalil Abdul Hadi	884	
Muhammad Sanusi Md Nor	877	
Kamaruzaman Mohamad	872	
Khairil Nizam Khirudin	844	
Riduan Mohd Nor	841	
Iskandar Abdul Samad	822	
Halimah Ali	774	
Mohamad Fadzli Hassan	736	
Ahmad Marzuk Shaary	707	
Mohd Nassuruddin Daud	706	
Najihatussalehah Ahmad	695	
Siti Zailah Mohd Yusof	688	
Azman Ibrahim	679	
Nasrudin Hassan Tantawi	645	
Ahmad Amzad Hashim	615	
Ali Akbar Gulasan	613	
Mahfodz Mohamed	609	
Rosni Adam	609	
Abdullah Husin		
Ahmad Fakhruddin Sheikh Fakhrurazi		
Ahmad Saad @ Yahaya		
Ahmad Samsuri Mokhtar		
Ahmad Yunus Hairi		
Awang Hashim		
Azahar Yaakub @ Ariffin		
Khairuddin Aman Razali Al-Takiri		
Khairul Faizi Ahmad Kamil		
Misbahul Munir Masduki		
Mohd Mazri Yahya		
Mohd Shukri Ramli		
Mohd Yusni Mat Piah		
Mohd Zuhdi Marzuki		
Mokhtar Senik		
Muhammad Ismi Mat Taib		
Muhtar Suhaili		
Nik Mohamad Abduh Nik Abdul Aziz		
Razman Zakaria		
Rosli Abdul Jabar		
Sallehen Mukhyi		
Takiyuddin Hassan		
Wan Rohimi Wan Daud		
Yahaya Ali		
Ahmad Fadhli Shaari	Withdraw	
