= Afnan Hamimi =

Malaysian politician

Yang Berhormat Tuan Afnan Hamimi Taib Azamudden SSS AMK MP
- أفنان هميمي طائب عزم الدين
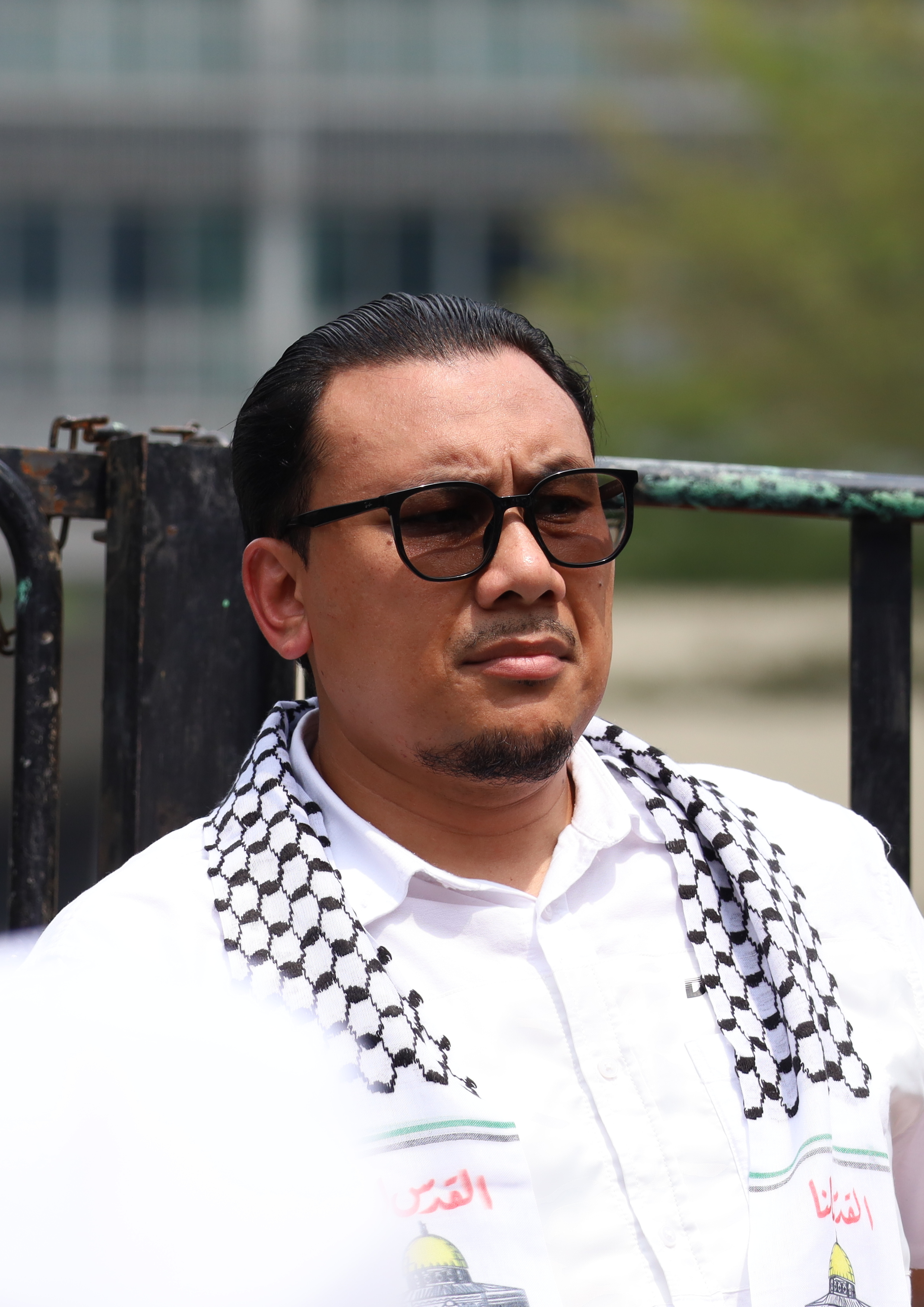
- Afnan Hamimi in 2025

Member of the Malaysian Parliament for Alor Setar
- Incumbent
- Assumed office 19 November 2022
- Preceded by: Chan Ming Kai (PH–PKR)
- Majority: 9,931 (2022)

Youth Chief of the Perikatan Nasional
- Incumbent
- Assumed office 20 January 2024
- Chairman: Muhyiddin Yassin
- Preceded by: Ahmad Fadhli Shaari

Youth Chief of the Malaysian Islamic Party
- Incumbent
- Assumed office 19 October 2023
- President: Abdul Hadi Awang
- Deputy: Mohd Hafez Sabri
- Preceded by: Ahmad Fadhli Shaari

Personal details
- Born: Afnan Hamimi bin Taib Azamudden; 27 June 1981 (age 45)
- Party: Malaysian Islamic Party (PAS)
- Other political affiliations: Perikatan Nasional (PN)
- Spouse: Najibatulhuda Abdul Raman
- Children: 6
- Parents: Taib Azamudden Md Taib (father); Norlia Abdul (mother)
- Education: Kolej Ugama Sultan Zainal Abidin; Al-Azhar University; Universiti Sains Malaysia
- Occupation: Politician

Afnan Hamimi bin Taib Azamudden (born 27 June 1981) is a Malaysian politician who has served as the Member of Parliament (MP) for Alor Setar since November 2022. He is the first Alor Setar MP of Malay ethnicity. He is a member of Malaysian Islamic Party (PAS), a component party of the Perikatan Nasional (PN) coalition. He has also served as the Youth Chief of PN since January 2024 and of PAS since October 2023.

== Early life and education ==
Afnan Hamimi's father was the former Grand Imam of the National Mosque, Dato' Taib Azamudden Md Taib. Afnan Hanimi continued his Diploma in Islamic Studies (Usuluddin) from Kolej Ugama Sultan Zainal Abidin (KUSZA), now known as Universiti Sultan Zainal Abidin (UniSZA), Terengganu. He continued his Bachelor's degree in Usuluddin (Tafsir) at Al-Azhar University, Egypt, before continuing his Master's degree in Islamic Development Management at Universiti Sains Malaysia (USM, Penang).

== Early career ==
Afnan Hamimi served as general manager for Ahsana Enterprise. He also served as Ahli Majlis Agama Islam Pulau Pinang (2012–2015), Ahli Jawatankuasa Fatwa Pulau Pinang (2013–2015), Ahli Lembaga Pengarah Kolej Islam Teknologi Antarabangsa (2013–2015) and chairman of Jawatankuasa Teknikal Penubuhan Perbadanan Wakaf Pulau Pinang (2014).

== Political career ==
He served as the Penang's chief of PAS Youth Wing. Then, he won the election as vice chief of PAS Youth Wing from 2021 until 2023. He won uncontested for the position of chief of PAS Youth Wing in 2023 PAS leadership election.

In the 2022 general election, he won the seat for Alor Setar and became the first Malay to represent the constituency.

== Personal life ==
Afnan Hamimi is married to Najibatulhuda Abdul Raman and they have six children{{citation needed}}.

== Election results ==
Parliament of Malaysia
Year	Constituency	Candidate	Votes	Pct	Opponent(s)	Votes	Pct	Ballots cast	Majority	Turnout
2013	P041 Kepala Batas	Afnan Hamimi Taib Azamudden (PAS)	20,952	45.47%	Reezal Merican Naina Merican (UMNO)	25,128	54.53%	46,738	4,176	90.52%
2018	P044 Permatang Pauh	Afnan Hamimi Taib Azamudden (PAS)	14,428	20.66%	Nurul Izzah Anwar (PKR)	35,534	50.89%	69,828	15,668	86.18%
2018	P044 Permatang Pauh	Afnan Hamimi Taib Azamudden (PAS)	14,428	20.66%	Zaidi Mohd Said (UMNO)	19,866	28.45%	69,828	15,668	86.18%
2022	P009 Alor Setar	Afnan Hamimi Taib Azamudden (PAS)	37,486	48.69%	Simon Ooi Tze Min (PKR)	27,555	35.79%	77,976	9,931	73.60%
2022	P009 Alor Setar	Afnan Hamimi Taib Azamudden (PAS)	37,486	48.69%	Tan Chee Heong (MCA)	8,930	11.60%	77,976	9,931	73.60%
2022	P009 Alor Setar	Afnan Hamimi Taib Azamudden (PAS)	37,486	48.69%	Mohamad Nuhairi Rahmat (PEJUANG)	2,383	3.10%	77,976	9,931	73.60%
2022	P009 Alor Setar	Afnan Hamimi Taib Azamudden (PAS)	37,486	48.69%	Fadzil Hanafi (WARISAN)	366	0.48%	77,976	9,931	73.60%
2022	P009 Alor Setar	Afnan Hamimi Taib Azamudden (PAS)	37,486	48.69%	Sofan Feroza Md Yusup (IND)	151	0.20%	77,976	9,931	73.60%
2022	P009 Alor Setar	Afnan Hamimi Taib Azamudden (PAS)	37,486	48.69%	Nordin Yunus (IND)	115	0.15%	77,976	9,931	73.60%

== Honours ==
=== Honours of Malaysia ===
- Malaysia
  - Recipient of the 17th Yang di-Pertuan Agong Installation Medal (2024)
- Kedah
  - Companion of the Order of Loyalty to Sultan Sallehuddin of Kedah (SSS) (2026)
  - Member of the Order of the Crown of Kedah (AMK)

== See also ==
- Members of the Dewan Rakyat, 15th Malaysian Parliament
