= 2023 Pan-Malaysian Islamic Party leadership election =

Election in a political party in Malaysia

- 20–22 October 2023
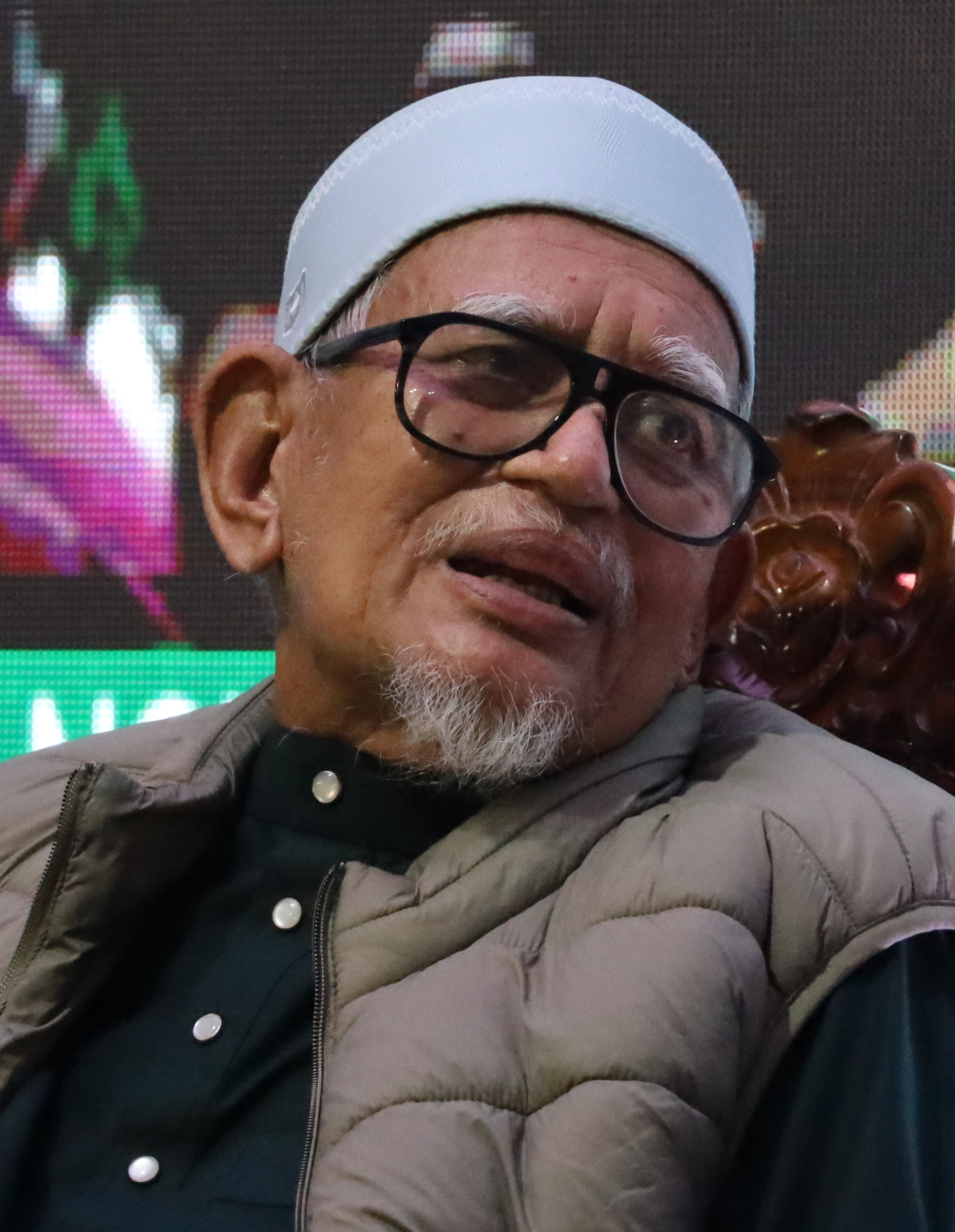
Candidate	Abdul Hadi Awang
Popular vote	Won uncontested
President of PAS before election
Abdul Hadi Awang
President of PAS after election
Abdul Hadi Awang

A leadership election was held by the Pan-Malaysian Islamic Party (PAS) in 20 until 22 October 2023 in IDCC Ideal Convention Centre, Shah Alam, Selangor. It was won by incumbent president of PAS, Abdul Hadi Awang.

== Timeline ==
=== September ===
- 29 September 2023: PAS Secretary General, Takiyuddin Hassan announced that the positions of PAS president, deputy president and vice presidents for this election were won unopposed by the incumbent since there were no other nominations.

=== October ===
- 22 October 2023: Results of the election was announced.

== Election results ==
The following are the election results for the membership of the PAS Central Committee for the 2023–2025 session.

=== Central Working Committee ===
==== Permanent Chairman ====
Candidate	Delegates' votes
Hussin Ismail	Won uncontested

==== Deputy Permanent Chairman ====
Candidate	Delegates' votes
Kamal Ashaari	Won uncontested

==== Auditor ====
Candidate	Delegates' votes
Mat Syukur Abdul Aziz	Won uncontested
Mohammad Najib Ahmad	Won uncontested

==== President ====
Candidate	Delegates' votes
Abdul Hadi Awang	Won uncontested

==== Deputy President ====
Candidate	Delegates' votes
Tuan Ibrahim Tuan Man	Won uncontested

==== Vice Presidents ====
Candidate	Delegates' votes
Idris Ahmad	Won uncontested
Mohd Amar Abdullah	Won uncontested
Ahmad Samsuri Mokhtar	Won uncontested
Muhammad Sanusi Md Nor	Withdraw

==== Central Working Committee Members ====
Candidate	Delegates' votes
Muhammad Sanusi Md Nor	1,098
Ahmad Fadhli Shaari	1,042
Muhammad Khalil Abdul Hadi	1,033
Azman Ibrahim	995
Halimah Ali	961
Khairil Nizam Khirudin	945
Ahmad Marzuk Shaary	944
Siti Zailah Mohd Yusoff	941
Awang Hashim	926
Riduan Mohamad Nor	924
Ahmad Amzad Hashim	915
Mohd Nassuruddin Daud	914
Mohamed Fadzli Hassan	911
Kamaruzaman Mohamad	865
Najihatussalehah Ahmad	815
Misbahul Munir Masduki	808
Iskandar Abdul Samad	806
Rosni Adam	777
