= Hassan Saad =

Hassan Saad may refer to:

- Soony Saad, footballer
- Hassan Saad (politician), Malaysian politician
