= Baling (federal constituency) =

Federal constituency of Kedah, Malaysia

Baling (P016)
Kedah constituency

Federal constituency
- Legislature: Dewan Rakyat
- MP: Hassan Saad; PN
- Constituency created: 1958
- First contested: 1959
- Last contested: 2022

Demographics
- Population (2020): 142,530
- Electors (2023): 132,517
- Area (km²): 1,540
- Pop. density (per km²): 92.6

Baling is a federal constituency in Baling District, Kedah, Malaysia, that has been represented in the Dewan Rakyat since 1959.

The federal constituency was created in the 1958 redistribution and is mandated to return a single member to the Dewan Rakyat under the first past the post voting system.

== Demographics ==
Ethnic breakdown of Baling's electorate as of 2022
1. Malay (89.6%)
2. Indian (4.90%)
3. Chinese (4.30%)
4. Other ethnicities (1.20%)

As of 2020, Baling has a population of 142,530 people.

Age breakdown of Baling's electorate as of 2022
1. 18-20 (6.27%)
2. 21-29 (22.1%)
3. 30-39 (22.6%)
4. 40-49 (17.4%)
5. 50-59 (14.6%)
6. 60-69 (10.2%)
7. 70-79 (4.81%)
8. 80-89 (1.77%)
9. above 90 (0.35%)
Gender breakdown of Baling's electorate as of 2022
1. Male (49.0%)
2. Female (51.0%)

== History ==
=== Polling districts ===
According to the federal gazette issued on 18 July 2023, the Baling constituency is divided into 78 polling districts.

State constituency	Polling Districts	Code	Location
Bayu (N30）	Kampung Batu Lapan	016/30/01	SK Tanjong Pari
Bayu (N30）	Tanjong Pari	016/30/02	SK Tanjong Pari
Bayu (N30）	Kampung Weng	016/30/03	SK Seri Bayu
Bayu (N30）	Kampung Surau	016/30/04	SMK Siong
Bayu (N30）	Kampung Legong	016/30/05	Tadika KEDA Taman Ummi
Bayu (N30）	Kampung Lalang	016/30/06	SK Siong
Bayu (N30）	Kampung Luar	016/30/07	SJK (C) Kampung Lalang
Bayu (N30）	Kampung Bandar	016/30/08	SK Kampung Bandar
Bayu (N30）	Tandop	016/30/09	SK Penghulu Abu Bakar
Bayu (N30）	Bongor Mesjid	016/30/10	Maktab Mahmud Baling
Bayu (N30）	Bongor Sekolah	016/30/11	SMK Bongor
Bayu (N30）	Kampung Haji Abbas	016/30/12	SJK (C) Yeok Chee
Bayu (N30）	Rambong Baling	016/30/13	SK Tunku Puan Habsah
Bayu (N30）	Batu 7 Jalan Kroh	016/30/14	SK Tunku Puan Habsah
Bayu (N30）	Simpang Empat	016/30/15	Sekolah Khas Baling
Bayu (N30）	Pekan Baling	016/30/16	SMK Baling
Bayu (N30）	Bukit Baling	016/30/17	SK Tunku Putera
Bayu (N30）	Sebrang Baling	016/30/18	SK Baling
Bayu (N30）	Dalam Wang	016/30/19	SK Dalam Wang
Bayu (N30）	Pekan Pulai	016/30/20	SK Pulai
Bayu (N30）	Pokok Sena	016/30/21	SMK Tunku Putera
Bayu (N30）	Telok Teduri	016/30/22	SK Telok Teduri
Bayu (N30）	Sera Mesjid	016/30/23	SK Kampung Sera
Bayu (N30）	Telok Sera	016/30/24	SK Rambong Pulai
Bayu (N30）	Kampung Tiak	016/30/25	SK Tiak
Bayu (N30）	Bendang Padang	016/30/26	Taman Bimbingan Kanak-Kanak Kampung Bendang Bechah
Bayu (N30）	Kuala Kuang	016/30/27	SK Kuala Kuang
Bayu (N30）	Kampung Iboi	016/30/28	SK Iboi
Kupang (N31）	Charok Salang	016/31/01	SK Lanai
Kupang (N31）	Kampung Asam Jawa	016/31/02	SK Asam Jawa
Kupang (N31）	Charok Kelian	016/31/03	SK Asam Jawa
Kupang (N31）	Sungai Limau	016/31/04	SK Titi Gantong
Kupang (N31）	Charok Bemban	016/31/05	SMK Syed Abu Bakar
Kupang (N31）	Gua Reban	016/31/06	SK Seberang Ketil
Kupang (N31）	Kampung Padang	016/31/07	SK Kampung Padang
Kupang (N31）	Lanai	016/31/08	SK Lanai
Kupang (N31）	Mengkuang	016/31/09	SMK Kuala Pegang
Kupang (N31）	Lubok Kabu	016/31/10	SMK Kuala Pegang
Kupang (N31）	Kuala Pegang	016/31/11	SK Kuala Pegang
Kupang (N31）	Kampung Raha	016/31/12	SK Kuala Kupang
Kupang (N31）	Kampung Landak	016/31/13	SJK (C) Seng Yok
Kupang (N31）	Pekan Kupang	016/31/14	SK Kampung Keda
Kupang (N31）	Kuala Chenerai	016/31/15	SJK (C) Chin Hwa
Kupang (N31）	Ketemba	016/31/16	SK Kuala Pegang
Kupang (N31）	Kampung Sadek	016/31/17	SK Kampung Sadek
Kupang (N31）	Bukit Terabak	016/31/18	SMA (Arab) Diniah Islamiyah
Kupang (N31）	Simpang Jerai	016/31/19	SMK Jerai
Kupang (N31）	Kampung Tanjong	016/31/20	SK Syed Sheh
Kupang (N31）	Ladang Sungai Tawar	016/31/21	Dewan Orang Ramai (Tokong Hindu) Kampung Dara
Kupang (N31）	Badenoch	016/31/22	SMK Bakai
Kupang (N31）	Ulu Bakai	016/31/23	SK Ulu Bakai
Kupang (N31）	Pekan Malau	016/31/24	SK Malau
Kupang (N31）	Badang	016/31/25	SK Badang
Kupang (N31）	Kampung Sidim	016/31/26	SK Badang
Kuala Ketil（N32）	FELDA Teloi Kanan	016/32/01	SK Teloi Kanan
Kuala Ketil（N32）	Kampung Guar Chempedak	016/32/02	SK Mohd Ariff Abdullah
Kuala Ketil（N32）	Padang Kulim	016/32/03	SK Kuala Ketil
Kuala Ketil（N32）	Pekan Baru Kuala Ketil	016/32/04	SMK Kuala Ketil
Kuala Ketil（N32）	Pekan Lama Kuala Ketil	016/32/05	SMK Tanjung Puteri
Kuala Ketil（N32）	Taman Batu Pekaka	016/32/06	SJK (C) Kuala Ketil
Kuala Ketil（N32）	Batu Pekaka	016/32/07	SK Batu Pekaka
Kuala Ketil（N32）	Kampung Thye Seng	016/32/08	SJK (T) Ladang Batu Pekaka
Kuala Ketil（N32）	Kuala Kuli	016/32/09	SK Seri Jemerli
Kuala Ketil（N32）	Kampung Jawa	016/32/10	SK Kuala Ketil
Kuala Ketil（N32）	Padang Geh	016/32/11	SJK (T) Ladang Kim Seng
Kuala Ketil（N32）	Kuala Merah	016/32/12	SK Kuala Merah
Kuala Ketil（N32）	Parit Panjang	016/32/13	SMK Parit Panjang
Kuala Ketil（N32）	Kampung Tembak	016/32/14	SK Tembak
Kuala Ketil（N32）	Paya Besar	016/32/15	SK Paya Besar
Kuala Ketil（N32）	Kuala Samak	016/32/16	SK Kuala Semak
Kuala Ketil（N32）	Binjol Dalam	016/32/17	SK Binjul Dalam
Kuala Ketil（N32）	Kampung Tawar	016/32/18	SK Tawar
Kuala Ketil（N32）	Pekan Tawar	016/32/19	SJK (C) Kong Min
Kuala Ketil（N32）	Binjal Luar	016/32/20	SK Binjul
Kuala Ketil（N32）	Ladang Malakoff	016/32/21	SJK (T) Ladang Malakoff
Kuala Ketil（N32）	Kejal	016/32/22	SK Kampung Selarong
Kuala Ketil（N32）	Kampung Bakai	016/32/23	SK Seri Inas
Kuala Ketil（N32）	Pelam	016/32/24	SJK (T) Ladang Pelam

=== Representation history ===
Members of Parliament for Baling
Parliament	No	Years	Member	Party	Vote Share
Constituency created from Sungei Muda
Parliament of the Federation of Malaya
1st	P011	1959–1963	Harun Abdullah (هارون عبدالله)	Alliance (UMNO)	12,118; 70.27%
Parliament of Malaysia
1st	P011	1963–1964	Harun Abdullah (هارون عبدالله)	Alliance (UMNO)	12,118; 70.27%
2nd	P011	1964–1969	Harun Abdullah (هارون عبدالله)	Alliance (UMNO)	14,970; 68.17%
		1969–1971	Parliament was suspended		
3rd	P011	1971–1973	Shafie Abdullah (شافعي عبدالله)	Alliance (UMNO)	16,247; 59.78%
3rd	P011	1973–1974	Shafie Abdullah (شافعي عبدالله)	BN (UMNO)	16,247; 59.78%
4th	P010	1974–1978	Shafie Abdullah (شافعي عبدالله)	BN (UMNO)	Uncontested
5th	P010	1978–1982	Mohd. Nakhaie Ahmad (محمد. نقهاياي احمد)	PAS	13,623; 48.45%
6th	P010	1982–1986	Seroji Haron (سروجي هراون)	BN (UMNO)	18,743; 60.20%
7th	P013	1986–1990	Raja Ariffin Raja Sulaiman (راج عريفين راج سليمان)	BN (UMNO)	17,995; 60.59%
8th	P013	1990–1995	Raja Ariffin Raja Sulaiman (راج عريفين راج سليمان)	BN (UMNO)	20,590; 62.87%
9th	P016	1995–1999	Raja Ariffin Raja Sulaiman (راج عريفين راج سليمان)	BN (UMNO)	21,448; 57.65%
10th	P016	1999–2004	Taib Azamudden Md Taib (طائب عزاموددن مد طائب)	BA (PAS)	21,468; 51.68%
11th	P016	2004–2008	Mashitah Ibrahim (مشاته إبراهيم)	BN (UMNO)	32,661; 53.46%
12th	P016	2008–2013	Taib Azamudden Md Taib (طائب عزاموددن مد طائب)	PR (PAS)	36,074; 55.90%
13th	P016	2013–2018	Abdul Azeez Abdul Rahim (عبد العزيز عبد الرحيم)	BN (UMNO)	43,504; 53.17%
14th	P016	2018–2022	Abdul Azeez Abdul Rahim (عبد العزيز عبد الرحيم)	BN (UMNO)	38,557; 42.60%
15th	P016	2022–present	Hassan Saad (حسن سعد)	PN (PAS)	64,493; 59.13%

=== State constituency ===
Parliamentary constituency	State constituency						
Parliamentary constituency	1955–1959*	1959–1974	1974–1986	1986–1995	1995–2004	2004–2018	2018–present
Baling		Baling Barat					
Baling		Baling Timor					
Baling			Bayu				
Baling						Kuala Ketil	
Baling			Kupang				

=== Historical boundaries ===
State Constituency	Area					
State Constituency	1959	1974	1984	1994	2003	2018
Baling Barat	Charok Salang; Kampung Lahar; Kampung Relau; Kuala Ketil; Kuala Kuang					
Baling Timor	Baling; Bayu; Cherok Ulu; Kuala Kemangi; Kupang					
Bayu		Baling; Bayu; Cherok Ulu; Kuala Kemangi; Kuala Iboi	Baling; Bayu; Bongor; Kuala Kemangi; Kuala Iboi		Baling; Bayu; Bongor; Kuala Kuang; Kuala Iboi	
Kuala Ketil					FELDA Teloi Kanan; Kampung Baru Kejai; Kampung Pantai Cicar; Kuala Ketil; Tawar	
Kupang		Charok Salang; FELCRA Bukit Hijau; Kampung Relau; Kampung Tas; Kupang	Charok Salang; FELCRA Bukit Hijau; Kampung Relau; Kampung Ulu Bakai; Kupang		Charok Salang; Cherok Bemban; FELCRA Bukit Hijau; Kampung Ulu Bakai; Kupang	

=== Current state assembly members ===
No.	State Constituency	Member	Coalition (Party)
N30	Bayu	Mohd Taufik Yaacob	PN (BERSATU)
N31	Kupang	Najmi Ahmad	PN (PAS)
N32	Kuala Ketil	Mansor Zakaria	PN (PAS)

=== Local governments & postcodes ===
No.	State Constituency	Local Government	Postcode
N30	Bayu	Baling District Council	09100 Baling; 09110 Kuala Pegang; 09200 Kupang; 09300, 09310 Kuala Ketil
N31	Kupang	Baling District Council	09100 Baling; 09110 Kuala Pegang; 09200 Kupang; 09300, 09310 Kuala Ketil
N32	Kuala Ketil	Baling District Council	09100 Baling; 09110 Kuala Pegang; 09200 Kupang; 09300, 09310 Kuala Ketil

== Election results ==
Malaysian general election, 2022
Party	Candidate	Votes	%	∆%
PN	Hassan Saad	64,493	59.13	▲59.13
BN	Abdul Azeez Abdul Rahim	35,356	32.42	▼10.18
PH	Johari Abdullah	8,636	7.92	▲7.92
PEJUANG	Bashir Abdul Rahman	579	0.53	▲0.53
Total valid votes		109,064	100.00	
Total rejected ballots		1,141		
Unreturned ballots		148		
Turnout		110,353	82.75	▼3.18
Registered electors		132,099		
Majority		29,137	26.71	▲25.52
PN gain from BN		Swing		?
Source(s) https://lom.agc.gov.my/ilims/upload/portal/akta/outputp/1753260/PUB%20606%20(2022).pdf

Malaysian general election, 2018
Party	Candidate	Votes	%	∆%
BN	Abdul Azeez Abdul Rahim	38,557	42.60	▼10.57
PAS	Hassan Saad	37,483	41.41	▼5.42
PKR	Mohd Taufik Yaacob	14,472	15.99	▲15.99
Total valid votes		90,512	100.00	
Total rejected ballots		1,388		
Unreturned ballots		228		
Turnout		92,128	85.93	▼3.27
Registered electors		107,213		
Majority		1,074	1.19	▼5.15
BN hold		Swing		
Source(s) "His Majesty's Government Gazette - Notice of Contested Election, Parliament for the State of Kedah [P.U. (B) 233/2018]" (PDF). Attorney General's Chambers of Malaysia. 3 May 2018. "Federal Government Gazette - Results of Contested Election and Statements of the Poll after the Official Addition of Votes, Parliamentary Constituencies for the State of Kedah [P.U. (B) 307/2018]" (PDF). Attorney General's Chambers of Malaysia. 28 May 2018.

Malaysian general election, 2013
Party	Candidate	Votes	%	∆%
BN	Abdul Azeez Abdul Rahim	43,504	53.17	▲9.07
PAS	Najmi Ahmad	38,319	46.83	▼9.07
Total valid votes		81,823	100.00	
Total rejected ballots		1,091		
Unreturned ballots		195		
Turnout		83,109	89.20	▲5.73
Registered electors		93,168		
Majority		5,185	6.34	▼5.46
BN gain from PAS		Swing		?
Source(s) "Federal Government Gazette - Notice of Contested Election, Parliament for the State of Kedah [P.U. (B) 170/2013]" (PDF). Attorney General's Chambers of Malaysia. 26 April 2013. Archived from the original (PDF) on 29 December 2019. "Federal Government Gazette - Results of Contested Election and Statements of the Poll after the Official Addition of Votes, Parliamentary Constituencies for the State of Kedah [P.U. (B) 211/2013]" (PDF). Attorney General's Chambers of Malaysia. 22 May 2013.

Malaysian general election, 2008
Party	Candidate	Votes	%	∆%
PAS	Taib Azamudden Md Taib	36,074	55.90	▲9.36
BN	Abdul Azeez Abdul Rahim	28,461	44.10	▼9.36
Total valid votes		64,535	100.00	
Total rejected ballots		1,154		
Unreturned ballots		75		
Turnout		65,764	83.47	▲0.20
Registered electors		78,784		
Majority		7,613	11.80	▲4.88
PAS gain from BN		Swing		?

Malaysian general election, 2004
Party	Candidate	Votes	%	∆%
BN	Mashitah Ibrahim	32,661	53.46	▲5.14
PAS	Taib Azamudden Md Taib	28,432	46.54	▼5.14
Total valid votes		61,093	100.00	
Total rejected ballots		1,109		
Unreturned ballots		0		
Turnout		62,202	83.27	▲4.34
Registered electors		74,699		
Majority		4,229	6.92	▲3.56
BN gain from PAS		Swing		?

Malaysian general election, 1999
Party	Candidate	Votes	%	∆%
PAS	Taib Azamudden Md Taib	21,468	51.68	▼9.33
BN	Bahador Shah Md. Isa	20,074	48.32	▲9.33
Total valid votes		41,542	100.00	
Total rejected ballots		664		
Unreturned ballots		328		
Turnout		42,534	78.93	▲3.00
Registered electors		53,888		
Majority		1,394	3.36	▼11.94
PAS gain from BN		Swing		?

Malaysian general election, 1995
Party	Candidate	Votes	%	∆%
BN	Raja Ariffin Raja Sulaiman	21,448	57.65	▼5.22
PAS	Mohamad @ Md. Yusoff Ismail	15,755	42.35	▲5.22
Total valid votes		37,203	100.00	
Total rejected ballots		1,153		
Unreturned ballots		60		
Turnout		38,416	75.93	▼2.01
Registered electors		50,593		
Majority		5,693	15.30	▼10.44
BN hold		Swing		

Malaysian general election, 1990
Party	Candidate	Votes	%	∆%
BN	Raja Ariffin Raja Sulaiman	20,590	62.87	▲2.28
PAS	Yusof Husin	12,161	37.13	▼2.28
Total valid votes		32,751	100.00	
Total rejected ballots		720		
Unreturned ballots		0		
Turnout		33,471	77.94	▲1.82
Registered electors		42,945		
Majority		8,429	25.74	▲4.56
BN hold		Swing		

Malaysian general election, 1986
Party	Candidate	Votes	%	∆%
BN	Raja Ariffin Raja Sulaiman	17,995	60.59	▲0.39
PAS	Haron Othman	11,706	39.41	▼0.39
Total valid votes		29,701	100.00	
Total rejected ballots		754		
Unreturned ballots		0		
Turnout		30,455	76.12	▼1.51
Registered electors		40,008		
Majority		6,289	21.18	▲0.78
BN hold		Swing		

Malaysian general election, 1982
Party	Candidate	Votes	%	∆%
BN	Seroji Haron	18,743	60.20	▲12.78
PAS	Mohd. Nakhaie Ahmad	12,394	39.80	▼8.65
Total valid votes		31,137	100.00	
Total rejected ballots		1,178		
Unreturned ballots		0		
Turnout		32,315	77.63	▼0.55
Registered electors		41,626		
Majority		6,349	20.40	▲19.37
BN gain from PAS		Swing		?

Malaysian general election, 1978
Party	Candidate	Votes	%	∆%
PAS	Mohd. Nakhaie Ahmad	13,623	48.45	▲48.45
BN	Shafie Abdullah	13,332	47.42	▲47.42
Independent	Abu Bakar Sarda	1,161	4.13	▲4.13
Total valid votes		28,116	100.00	
Total rejected ballots		867		
Unreturned ballots		0		
Turnout		28,983	78.18	
Registered electors		37,072		
Majority		291	1.03	
PAS gain from BN		Swing		?

Malaysian general election, 1974
Party	Candidate	Votes	%	∆%
On the nomination day, Shafie Abdullah won uncontested.
BN	Shafie Abdullah			
Total valid votes			100.00	
Total rejected ballots				
Unreturned ballots				
Turnout				
Registered electors		32,738		
Majority				
BN gain from Alliance		Swing		?

Malaysian general election, 1969
Party	Candidate	Votes	%	∆%
Alliance	Shafie Abdullah	16,247	59.78	▼8.39
PMIP	Mohamed Romli Abdullah	10,932	40.22	▲16.50
Total valid votes		27,179	100.00	
Total rejected ballots		1,160		
Unreturned ballots		0		
Turnout		28,339	78.26	▲5.30
Registered electors		36,210		
Majority		5,315	19.56	▼24.89
Alliance hold		Swing		

Malaysian general election, 1964
Party	Candidate	Votes	%	∆%
Alliance	Harun Abdullah	14,970	68.17	▼2.10
PMIP	Ya'acob Shafie	5,208	23.72	▲3.30
Socialist Front	Abdullah Mohd Hashim	1,782	8.11	▲8.11
Total valid votes		21,960	100.00	
Total rejected ballots		1,255		
Unreturned ballots		0		
Turnout		23,215	72.96	▼2.45
Registered electors		31,820		
Majority		9,762	44.45	▼5.40
Alliance hold		Swing		

Malayan general election, 1959
Party	Candidate	Votes	%
Alliance	Harun Abdullah	12,118	70.27
PMIP	Syed Jan Aljeffri	3,521	20.42
Independent	Wan Basor Ali Wan Salim	1,605	9.31
Total valid votes		17,244	100.00
Total rejected ballots		132	
Unreturned ballots		0	
Turnout		17,376	75.41
Registered electors		23,043	
Majority		8,597	49.85
This was a new constituency created.
