= Jerantut (federal constituency) =

Federal constituency of Pahang, Malaysia

Jerantut (P081)
Pahang constituency

Federal constituency
- Legislature: Dewan Rakyat
- MP: Khairil Nizam Khirudin; PN
- Constituency created: 1974
- First contested: 1974
- Last contested: 2022

Demographics
- Population (2020): 104,771
- Electors (2022): 87,051
- Area (km²): 7,273
- Pop. density (per km²): 14.4

Jerantut is a federal constituency in Jerantut District and Maran District, Pahang, Malaysia, that has been represented in the Dewan Rakyat since 1974.

The federal constituency was created in the 1974 redistribution and is mandated to return a single member to the Dewan Rakyat under the first-past-the-post voting system.

== Demographics ==
https://live.chinapress.com.my/ge15/parliament/PAHANG

Ethnic breakdown of Jerantut's electorate as of 2022
1. Malay (83.5%)
2. Chinese (11.8%)
3. Indian (3.10%)
4. Other ethnicities (1.60%)

As of 2020, Jerantut has a population of 104,771 people.

Age breakdown of Jerantut's electorate as of 2022
1. 18-20 (6.36%)
2. 21-29 (20.9%)
3. 30-39 (25.1%)
4. 40-49 (18.8%)
5. 50-59 (12.4%)
6. 60-69 (8.79%)
7. 70-79 (5.86%)
8. 80-89 (1.48%)
9. above 90 (0.21%)
Gender breakdown of Jerantut's electorate as of 2022
1. Male (50.2%)
2. Female (49.8%)

== History ==
=== Polling districts ===
According to the federal gazette issued on 31 October 2022, the Jerantut constituency is divided into 44 polling districts.

State constituency	Polling Districts	Code	Location
Tahan (N09)	Kampung Sat	081/09/01	SK Kuala Sat
Tahan (N09)	Kampung Gusai	081/09/02	SK Gusai
Tahan (N09)	Kampung Bantal	081/09/03	SK Ulu Tembeling
Tahan (N09)	Kampung Mat Daling	081/09/04	SK Bukit Mat Daling
Tahan (N09)	Kampung Pagi	081/09/05	SK Kampung Pagi
Tahan (N09)	FELDA Sungai Retang	081/09/06	SK LKTP Sungai Retang
Tahan (N09)	FELDA Padang Piol	081/09/07	SK (FELDA) Padang Piol
Tahan (N09)	Kampung Gajah Mati	081/09/08	Balai Raya Kampung Gajah Mati
Tahan (N09)	Pulau Mansuk	081/09/09	SK Pulau Mansok
Tahan (N09)	Jerantut Feri	081/09/10	SK Pedah
Tahan (N09)	Tanah Rom	081/09/11	SK Tanah Rom
Tahan (N09)	Teh	081/09/12	SK Teh
Tahan (N09)	Kuala Tembeling	081/09/13	SJ Kuala Tembeling
Tahan (N09)	Pasir Durian	081/09/14	SK Pasir Durian
Tahan (N09)	Kampung Chebong	081/09/15	SK Chebong
Tahan (N09)	Kampung Merting	081/09/16	SK Merting
Tahan (N09)	Kuala Tahan	081/09/17	SK Kuala Tahan
Damak (N10)	Batu Balai	081/10/01	SJK (C) Batu Balai
Damak (N10)	Kampung Damak	081/10/02	SK Damak
Damak (N10)	Kampung Koi	081/10/03	Dewan Orang Ramai Kg. Koi
Damak (N10)	Kampung Som	081/10/04	Dewan JKKK Kampung Som
Damak (N10)	Kampung Baharu	081/10/05	SK Kampung Baharu
Damak (N10)	Kampung Lata Kasah	081/10/06	Balai Raya Lata Kasah
Damak (N10)	Bandar Jerantut Luar	081/10/07	SK Jerantut
Damak (N10)	Kampung Melayu	081/10/08	SK Bandar Jerantut
Damak (N10)	Bandar Baru	081/10/09	SK Jerantut Jaya
Damak (N10)	Sungai Jan	081/10/10	SJK (C) Sungai Jan
Damak (N10)	Taman Muhibbah	081/10/11	SMK Jerantut
Damak (N10)	Inderapura	081/10/12	SMK Padang Saujana
Damak (N10)	Kampung Temin	081/10/13	SK Temin
Damak (N10)	Kampung Gintong	081/10/14	SK Gintong
Damak (N10)	Kampung Batu Kawah	081/10/15	SK Tebing Tinggi
Damak (N10)	Bukit Dinding	081/10/16	SK Bukit Dinding
Damak (N10)	Tebing Tinggi	081/10/17	Dewan Orang Ramai Kampung Simpang Tebing Tinggi
Damak (N10)	Jeransong	081/10/18	SJK (C) Jeransong
Damak (N10)	Sungai Lekok	081/10/19	SK Sungai Kiol
Damak (N10)	Hulu Cheka	081/10/20	SMA Ehyail Maarif Ulu Cheka
Pulau Tawar (N11)	FELDA Kota Gelanggi 2	081/11/01	SK LKTP Kota Gelanggi 2
Pulau Tawar (N11)	FELDA Lepar Utara Tiga	081/11/02	SK LKTP Lepar Utara 8; SK LKTP Lepar Utara 1
Pulau Tawar (N11)	FELDA Sungai Tekam Utara	081/11/03	SK LKTP Tekam Utara
Pulau Tawar (N11)	Kampung Perak	081/11/04	Balai Raya Kampung Perak
Pulau Tawar (N11)	Pusat Penyelidikan Tun Razak	081/11/05	SK Pusat Penyelidikan Pertanian Tun Razak
Pulau Tawar (N11)	FELDA Sungai Tekam	081/11/06	SK KLTP Sungai Tekam
Pulau Tawar (N11)	FELDA Jengka 10	081/11/07	SMK LKTP Jengka 10
Pulau Tawar (N11)	FELDA Jengka 8	081/11/08	SK LKTP Jengka 8
Pulau Tawar (N11)	FELDA Jengka 9	081/11/09	SK LKTP Jengka 9
Pulau Tawar (N11)	FELDA Jengka 12	081/11/10	SK LKTP Jengka 12
Pulau Tawar (N11)	FELDA Jengka 13	081/11/11	SK LKTP Jengka 13
Pulau Tawar (N11)	FELDA Jengka 24	081/11/12	SK LKTP Jengka 24
Pulau Tawar (N11)	Durian Hijau	081/11/13	SK Durian Hijau
Pulau Tawar (N11)	Bukit Nikmat	081/11/14	SK Bukit Nikmat
Pulau Tawar (N11)	Pulau Tawar	081/11/15	SMA Pulau Tawar
Pulau Tawar (N11)	FELDA Kota Gelanggi 1	081/11/16	SK LKTP Kota Gelanggi 1
Pulau Tawar (N11)	FELDA Kota Gelanggi 3	081/11/17	SK LKTP Kota Gelanggi 3

=== Representation history ===
Members of Parliament for Jerantut
Parliament	No	Years	Member	Party	Vote Share
Constituency created from Lipis and Temerloh
4th	P066	1974–1978	Shariff Ahmad (شريف أحمد)	BN (UMNO)	Uncontested
5th	P066	1978–1982	Shariff Ahmad (شريف أحمد)	BN (UMNO)	14,052; 65.51%
6th	P066	1982–1986	Wan Abu Bakar Wan Mohamed (وان أبو بكر وان محمد)	BN (UMNO)	18,675; 63.20%
7th	P074	1986–1990	Wan Abu Bakar Wan Mohamed (وان أبو بكر وان محمد)	BN (UMNO)	15,159; 65.91%
8th	P074	1990–1995	Wan Abu Bakar Wan Mohamed (وان أبو بكر وان محمد)	BN (UMNO)	16,421; 59.72%
9th	P077	1995–1999	Ahmad Kamaruzaman Mohamed Baria (أحمد قمر الزمان محمد باريا)	BN (UMNO)	17,812; 62.65%
10th	P077	1999–2004	Tengku Azlan Sultan Abu Bakar (تڠكو أزلان سلطان أبو بكر)	BN (UMNO)	16,424; 52.33%
11th	P081	2004–2008	Tengku Azlan Sultan Abu Bakar (تڠكو أزلان سلطان أبو بكر)	BN (UMNO)	21,349; 62.35%
12th	P081	2008–2013	Tengku Azlan Sultan Abu Bakar (تڠكو أزلان سلطان أبو بكر)	BN (UMNO)	19,543; 52.62%
13th	P081	2013–2018	Ahmad Nazlan Idris (أحمد نظلان إدريس)	BN (UMNO)	26,544; 54.67%
14th	P081	2018–2022	Ahmad Nazlan Idris (أحمد نظلان إدريس)	BN (UMNO)	22,640; 45.06%
15th	P081	2022–present	Khairil Nizam Khirudin (خيرالنظام خيرالدين)	PN (PAS)	31,701; 47.49%

=== State constituency ===
Parliamentary constituency	State constituency						
Parliamentary constituency	1955–59*	1959–1974	1974–1986	1986–1995	1995–2004	2004–2018	2018–present
Jerantut			Bandar Jerantut				
Jerantut					Damak		
Jerantut			Jenderak				
Jerantut			Kerdau				
Jerantut				Pulau Tawar			
Jerantut			Tahan				
Jerantut			Tembeling				

=== Historical boundaries ===
State Constiteuncy	Area				
State Constiteuncy	1974	1984	1994	2003	2018
Bandar Jerantut	FELDA Jengka 9; FELDA Padang Piol; Kampung Bukit Genting; Kampung Simpang Tebing Tinggi; Sungai Jan				
Damak			Damak; Jerantut; Kampung Koi; Kampung Lata; Kampung Temin		
Jenderak	Damak; Jenderak; Kampung Perlok; Kampung Ulu Cheka; Kuala Krau				
Kerdau	FELDA Jengka 23-24; Kampung Bukit Dinding; Kampung Kelibang; Kampung Kuala Mai; Kerdau				
Pulau Tawar		FELDA Jengka 8-10, 12-13 & 24; Kampung Bukit Dinding; Kampung Pulau Tawar Baru; Kampung Simpang Tebing Tinggi; Kampung Temin	FELDA Kota Gelanggi 1-4; FELDA Lepar Utara; FELDA Sungai Tekam Utara; FELDA Jengka 8-10, 12-13 & 24; Pulau Tawar		
Tahan	FELDA Jengka 8-10; FELDA Kota Gelanggi; FELDA Sungai Tekam; FELDA Sungai Tekam Utara; Kuala Tahan		FELDA Padang Piol; FELDA Sungai Retang; Kampung Jerantut Peri; Kuala Tahan; Tembeling		
Tembeling	FELDA Sungai Retang; Jerantut; Kampung Lata; Mela; Tembeling	Damak; FELDA Sungai Retang; Jerantut; Kampung Lata; Tembeling			

=== Current state assembly members ===
No.	State Constituency	Member	Coalition (Party)
N09	Tahan	Mohd Zakhwan Ahmad Badarddin	PN (PAS)
N10	Damak	Zuridan Mohd Daud	PN (PAS)
N11	Pulau Tawar	Yohanis Ahmad	PN (PAS)

=== Local governments & postcodes ===
No.	State Constituency	Local Government	Postcode
N09	Tahan	Jerantut District Council	26400, 26420, 26430 Bandar Pusat Jengka; 27000, 27010, 27020, 27030, 27040, 27050, 27060, 27070, 27080, 27090, 27150 Jerantut
N10	Damak	Jerantut District Council	26400, 26420, 26430 Bandar Pusat Jengka; 27000, 27010, 27020, 27030, 27040, 27050, 27060, 27070, 27080, 27090, 27150 Jerantut
N11	Pulau Tawar	Jerantut District Council; Maran District Council (FELDA 9,10,12 and 13 areas)	26400, 26420, 26430 Bandar Pusat Jengka; 27000, 27010, 27020, 27030, 27040, 27050, 27060, 27070, 27080, 27090, 27150 Jerantut

== Election results ==
Malaysian general election, 2022
Party	Candidate	Votes	%	∆%
PN	Khairil Nizam Khirudin	31,701	47.49	▲47.49
BN	Mohd Zukarmi Abu Bakar	23,609	35.37	▼9.69
PH	Hassan Basri Awang Mat Dahan	11,444	17.14	▲17.14
Total valid votes		66,754	100.00	
Total rejected ballots		838		
Unreturned ballots		182		
Turnout		67,744	76.68	▼4.15
Registered electors		87,051		
Majority		8,092	12.12	▲0.36
PN gain from BN		Swing		?
Source(s) https://lom.agc.gov.my/ilims/upload/portal/akta/outputp/1753278/PUB611_2022.pdf

Malaysian general election, 2018
Party	Candidate	Votes	%	∆%
BN	Ahmad Nazlan Idris	22,640	45.06	▼9.61
PAS	Yohanis Ahmad	16,732	33.30	▼12.03
PKR	Wan Mohd Shaharir Wan Abd Jalil	10,877	21.64	▲21.64
Total valid votes		50,249	100.00	
Total rejected ballots		941		
Unreturned ballots		224		
Turnout		51,414	80.83	▼4.15
Registered electors		63,609		
Majority		5,908	11.76	▲2.42
BN hold		Swing		
Source(s) "His Majesty's Government Gazette - Notice of Contested Election, Parliament for the State of Pahang [P.U. (B) 238/2018]" (PDF). Attorney General's Chambers of Malaysia. 3 May 2018. "Federal Government Gazette - Results of Contested Election and Statements of the Poll after the Official Addition of Votes, Parliamentary Constituencies for the State of Pahang [P.U. (B) 312/2018]" (PDF). Attorney General's Chambers of Malaysia. 28 May 2018.

Malaysian general election, 2013
Party	Candidate	Votes	%	∆%
BN	Ahmad Nazlan Idris	26,544	54.67	▲2.05
PAS	Hamzah Jaafar	22,012	45.33	▼2.05
Total valid votes		48,556	100.00	
Total rejected ballots		905		
Unreturned ballots		139		
Turnout		49,600	84.98	▲6.97
Registered electors		58,364		
Majority		4,532	9.34	▲4.10
BN hold		Swing		
Source(s) "Federal Government Gazette - Notice of Contested Election, Parliament for the State of Pahang [P.U. (B) 175/2013]" (PDF). Attorney General's Chambers of Malaysia. 26 April 2013. "Federal Government Gazette - Results of Contested Election and Statements of the Poll after the Official Addition of Votes, Parliamentary Constituencies for the State of Pahang [P.U. (B) 216/2013]" (PDF). Attorney General's Chambers of Malaysia. 22 May 2013. Archived from the original (PDF) on 2019-07-01.

Malaysian general election, 2008
Party	Candidate	Votes	%	∆%
BN	Tengku Azlan Sultan Abu Bakar	19,543	52.62	▼9.73
PAS	Hamzah Jaafar	17,597	47.38	▲9.73
Total valid votes		37,140	100.00	
Total rejected ballots		829		
Unreturned ballots		109		
Turnout		38,078	78.01	▼1.11
Registered electors		48,812		
Majority		1,946	5.24	▼19.46
BN hold		Swing		

Malaysian general election, 2004
Party	Candidate	Votes	%	∆%
BN	Tengku Azlan Sultan Abu Bakar	21,349	62.35	▲10.02
PAS	Hamzah Jaafar	12,892	37.65	▼10.02
Total valid votes		34,241	100.00	
Total rejected ballots		776		
Unreturned ballots		1,427		
Turnout		36,444	79.12	▲4.53
Registered electors		46,061		
Majority		8,457	24.70	▲20.04
BN hold		Swing		

Malaysian general election, 1999
Party	Candidate	Votes	%	∆%
BN	Tengku Azlan Sultan Abu Bakar	16,424	52.33	▼10.32
PAS	Syed Ibrahim Syed Abd Rahman	14,961	47.67	▲10.32
Total valid votes		31,385	100.00	
Total rejected ballots		687		
Unreturned ballots		104		
Turnout		32,176	75.49	▲0.91
Registered electors		42,622		
Majority		1,463	4.66	▼20.64
BN hold		Swing		

Malaysian general election, 1995
Party	Candidate	Votes	%	∆%
BN	Ahmad Kamaruzaman Mohamed Baria	17,812	62.65	▲2.93
PAS	Syed Ibrahim Syed Abd Rahman	10,618	37.35	▼2.93
Total valid votes		28,430	100.00	
Total rejected ballots		1,213		
Unreturned ballots		141		
Turnout		29,784	74.58	▼2.28
Registered electors		39,935		
Majority		7,194	25.30	▲5.86
BN hold		Swing		

Malaysian general election, 1990
Party	Candidate	Votes	%	∆%
BN	Wan Abu Bakar Wan Mohamad	16,421	59.72	▼6.19
PAS	Syed Ibrahim Syed Abd Rahman	11,075	40.28	▲6.19
Total valid votes		27,496	100.00	
Total rejected ballots		858		
Unreturned ballots		0		
Turnout		28,354	76.86	▲4.74
Registered electors		36,891		
Majority		5,346	19.44	▼12.38
BN hold		Swing		

Malaysian general election, 1986
Party	Candidate	Votes	%	∆%
BN	Wan Abu Bakar Wan Mohamad	15,159	65.91	▲2.71
PAS	Syed Ibrahim Syed Abd Rahman	7,842	34.09	▼2.71
Total valid votes		23,001	100.00	
Total rejected ballots		806		
Unreturned ballots		0		
Turnout		23,807	72.12	▲4.29
Registered electors		33,010		
Majority		7,317	31.82	▲5.42
BN hold		Swing		

Malaysian general election, 1982
Party	Candidate	Votes	%	∆%
BN	Wan Abu Bakar Wan Mohamad	18,675	63.20	▲2.31
PAS	Syed Ibrahim Syed Abd Rahman	10,872	36.80	▼2.31
Total valid votes		29,547	100.00	
Total rejected ballots		1,408		
Unreturned ballots		0		
Turnout		30,955	76.41	▲1.54
Registered electors		40,514		
Majority		7,803	26.40	▼4.62
BN hold		Swing		

Malaysian general election, 1978
Party	Candidate	Votes	%	∆%
BN	Shariff Ahmad	14,052	65.51	▲65.51
PAS	Solahuddin Mohd Ali	7,399	34.49	▲34.49
Total valid votes		21,451	100.00	
Total rejected ballots		1,310		
Unreturned ballots		0		
Turnout		22,761	74.87	
Registered electors		30,402		
Majority		6,653	31.02	
BN hold		Swing		

Malaysian general election, 1974
Party	Candidate	Votes	%
On the nomination day, Shariff Ahmad won uncontested.
BN	Shariff Ahmad		
Total valid votes			100.00
Total rejected ballots			
Unreturned ballots			
Turnout			
Registered electors		24,662	
Majority			
This was a new constituency created.
