= Abdul Azeez Abdul Rahim =

Malaysian politician and businessman (born 1966)

Yang Berbahagia Datuk Seri Panglima Abdul Azeez Abdul Rahim PJN SPDK SSAP DCSM DHMS DIMP JP
- عبد العزيز عبد الرحيم
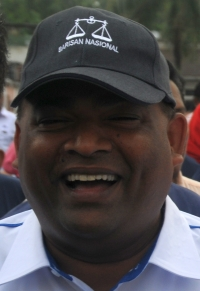
- Abdul Azeez Abdul Rahim

Chairman of the Tabung Haji
- In office 1 July 2013 – 14 May 2018
- Prime Minister: Najib Razak (2013–2018); Mahathir Mohamad (2018)
- Preceded by: Abi Musa Asa'ari Mohamed Nor
- Succeeded by: Mohammed Nor Md Yusof

Member of the Malaysian Parliament for Baling
- In office 5 May 2013 – 19 November 2022
- Preceded by: Taib Azamudden Md Taib (PR–PAS)
- Succeeded by: Hassan Saad (PN–PAS)
- Majority: 5,185 (2013); 1,074 (2018)

State Deputy Chairman of the United Malays National Organisation of Kedah
- Incumbent
- Assumed office 22 March 2023
- President: Ahmad Zahid Hamidi
- State Chairman: Mahdzir Khalid
- Preceded by: Suraya Yaacob

Personal details
- Born: Abdul Azeez bin Abdul Rahim; 19 November 1966 (age 59) Selangor, Malaysia
- Party: United Malays National Organisation (UMNO)
- Other political affiliations: Barisan Nasional (BN)
- Spouse: Khadijah Mohd Noor
- Children: 4
- Occupation: Politician
- Profession: Businessman
- Website: www.azeezrahim.com

Abdul Azeez bin Abdul Rahim (Jawi: عبدالعزيز بن عبدالرحيم, Tamil: அப்துல் அஸீஸ் பின் அப்துல் ரஹீம், romanized: Aptul asīs piṉ aptul rahīm; born 19 November 1966) is a Malaysian politician and businessman who served as the Member of Parliament (MP) for Baling from May 2013 to November 2022 and Chairman of the Tabung Haji (TH) from July 2013 to his resignation in May 2018. He is a member of United Malay National Organisation (UMNO), a component party of the Barisan Nasional (BN) coalition. He has served as the State Deputy Chairman of UMNO of Kedah since March 2023.

== Early life ==
Abdul Azeez was born as the third child out of 5 siblings.

== Political career ==
=== Party career ===
Abdul Azeez was elected to UMNO's Supreme Council, the body that governs the party, in 2009. He was the 25th and final candidate elected. He was re-elected to the Supreme Council in 2013, this time finishing in seventh place. He formerly headed "Putera UMNO", a group for young members of UMNO when he was the EXCO member of UMNO Youth.

=== Parliamentary career ===
Azeez was chosen as the Barisan Nasional (BN) candidate for the seat of Baling at the 2008 election. He lost to the Pan-Malaysian Islamic Party (PAS) candidate, Taib Azamudden Md Taib, by 7,613 votes. The state of Kedah swung back to BN at the 2013 election, and Azeez, selected again as the BN candidate in Baling, was elected to Parliament. He was re-elected in the 2018 election.

== GLC and NGO career ==
In 2011 Abdul Azeez became a director of Tabung Haji (TH), a Malaysian fund for Muslims to save for the hajj pilgrimage. In 2013, after his election to Parliament, he became Tabung Haji's chairman. However, in 2018, after his reelection as member of parliament and the change of ruling government to Pakatan Harapan (PH), he resigned as chairman of Tabung Haji.

Azeez also founded and headed the Putera 1Malaysia Club (Kelab Putera 1Malaysia), a non-government organization that has, among other things, led humanitarian missions to Gaza. In 2012 Hamas appointed him as an honorary ambassador for Palestine.

== Controversies and issues ==
=== Corruption allegations ===
On 22 May 2018, Malaysian Anti-Corruption Commission (MACC) raided and seized over RM500,000 in cash of various currencies, some documents, jewellery and luxury watches in several houses and offices in four states occupied by Azeez. In the midst of MACC investigation, Azeez announced he had tendered his resignation as the Tabung Haji's chairman on 14 May 2018.

The MACC arrested Azeez with his elder brother and cousin on 25 September 2018. Azeez was released on RM500,000 bail after his 10-day MACC remand ended. But MACC arrested his 24-year-old son the same day he was released.

Tabung Haji on 30 November 2018 reported to police against Azeez as its former chairman and senior management over alleged misuse of RM22 million belonging to a charitable fund for politically linked activities.

The MACC again arrested Azeez and his brother on 15 January 2019 where he was charged with 3 counts of RM 5.2 million graft and 9 counts of RM 139.4 million money laundering totaling RM 144.6 million on the next day.

On 7 August 2019, Kuala Lumpur Sessions Court set 25 Sep and 11 Oct to hear the corruption case of Azeez and his brother. After Judge Azura Alwi announced the dates, however, Deputy Public Prosecutor Azlinda Ahad said the prosecution will apply to transfer the case to the High Court. Defence lawyer Hisyam Teh Poh Teik did not raise any objection to the prosecution's plan.

=== Racism and misogyny ===
On 13 July 2020, during the first parliament sitting after the change in government, Azeez provoked a controversy for making racist and sexist comments. After the MP for Batu Kawan, Kasthuriraani Patto posed a question about the lack of women's representation, Azeez responded "sebab gelap, tak nampak" ("because it's too dark to see"), a comment seen as referring to her skin colour, despite the fact that his skin is the same colour. Azeez later retracted his statement without apologising before adding "if you are dark, put on some powder". Due to the incident, the Dewan Rakyat was adjourned for the day.

On 14 July 2020, Azeez was ordered by the Speaker to apologise to Kasthuriraani Patto during the morning session of the Parliament, after the Speaker ruled that his remarks were offensive. Azeez obeyed the order, but then went on to deflect blame by claiming that he had no intention of calling anyone "gelap", saying, "I was seated on that side for two years, and the area is "gelap" (dark) and we hardly get the Speaker's attention. I meant to say that the area is dark. It is important for the people to understand that I did not mean to call anyone with that word as I myself is dark-skinned, so there is really no reason for me to say that."

Kasthuriraani Patto objected to Azeez's excuse, and urged for firmer action by the Speaker, stating that Azeez was a repeat offender and that he obviously had no remorse. The Speaker however refused to prolong the issue, instead saying that he would take sterner action if the incident recurred.

== Personal life ==
He is married with Khadijah and have 4 children, namely Mohd Khairul Anwar, Mohd Khairul Azman, Khaleeda Azwa and Khaleeda Azeera respectively. He is fluent with Malay, English and Tamil.

== Election results ==
Parliament of Malaysia
Year	Constituency	Candidate	Votes	Pct	Opponent(s)	Votes	Pct	Ballots cast	Majority	Turnout
2008	P016 Baling	Abdul Azeez Abdul Rahim (UMNO)	28,461	44.10%	Taib Azamudden Md Taib (PAS)	36,074	55.90%	65,764	7,613	83.47%
2013	P016 Baling	Abdul Azeez Abdul Rahim (UMNO)	43,504	53.17%	Najmi Ahmad (PAS)	38,319	46.86%	83,109	5,185	89.20%
2018	P016 Baling	Abdul Azeez Abdul Rahim (UMNO)	38,557	42.60%	Hassan Saad (PAS)	37,483	41.41%	92,128	1,074	85.93%
2018	P016 Baling	Abdul Azeez Abdul Rahim (UMNO)	38,557	42.60%	Mohd Taufik Yaacob (BERSATU)	14,472	15.99%	92,128	1,074	85.93%
2022	P016 Baling	Abdul Azeez Abdul Rahim (UMNO)	35,356	32.42%	Hassan Saad (PAS)	64,493	59.13%	110,353	29,137	82.75%
2022	P016 Baling	Abdul Azeez Abdul Rahim (UMNO)	35,356	32.42%	Johari Abdullah (AMANAH)	8,636	7.92%	110,353	29,137	82.75%
2022	P016 Baling	Abdul Azeez Abdul Rahim (UMNO)	35,356	32.42%	Bashir Abdul Rahman (PUTRA)	579	0.53%	110,353	29,137	82.75%

== Honours ==
=== Malaysian honours ===
- Malaysia
  - Commander of the Order of Meritorious Service (PJN) – Datuk (2011)
- Kedah
  - Companion of the Order of Loyalty to Sultan Abdul Halim Mu'adzam Shah (DHMS) – Dato' Paduka (2017)
- Kelantan
  - Grand Commander of the Order of the Life of the Crown of Kelantan (SJMK) – Dato' (2016, revoked on 2 April 2019)
- Malacca
  - Justice of the Peace (JP) (2004)
  - Commander of the Exalted Order of Malacca (DCSM) – Datuk Wira (2015)
- Pahang
  - Companion of the Order of the Crown of Pahang (DIMP) – Dato' (2000)
  - Grand Companion of the Order of Sultan Ahmad Shah of Pahang (SSAP) – Dato' Sri (2013)
- Sabah
  - Grand Commander of the Order of Kinabalu (SPDK) – Datuk Seri Panglima (2014)

== See also ==
- Baling (federal constituency)
