= Taib Azamudden Md Taib =

Malaysian politician

Yang Berbahagia Dato' Taib Azamudden Md Taib DSDK JBS AMN JP
- طيب عزم الدين محمد طيب

Faction represented in Dewan Rakyat
- 1999–2004: Pan-Malaysian Islamic Party
- 2008–2013: Pan-Malaysian Islamic Party

Personal details
- Born: 19 October 1951 (age 74) Kedah, Federation of Malaya (now Malaysia)
- Party: Pan-Malaysian Islamic Party (PAS)
- Other political affiliations: Perikatan Nasional (PN); Muafakat Nasional (MN); Pakatan Rakyat (PR); Barisan Alternatif (BA)
- Children: Afnan Hamimi Taib Azamudden; Akram Ikrami Taib Azamudden
- Occupation: Politician, imam

Taib Azamudden bin Md Taib (born 19 October 1951) is a Malaysian politician of Pan-Malaysian Islamic Party (PAS). Taib was the Member of the Parliament of Malaysia for the Baling constituency in Kedah for two separate terms; from 1999 to 2004 and from 2008 to 2013. He sat in Parliament as a member of the opposition PAS.

Prior to joining PAS in politic, Taib was the imam of the National Mosque of Malaysia from 1993 to 1999.

Taib entered Parliament in the 1999 general election, winning the Baling constituency in Kedah. In the 2004 general election, he was one of many PAS parliamentarians to lost their seat, being defeated by Mashitah Ibrahim of the ruling Barisan Nasional coalition. He regained the Baling seat in the 2008 general election, defeating the Barisan Nasional's Abdul Azeez Abdul Rahim.

Taib suffered a stroke in 2013 and did not re-contest his seat in the general election later that year.

== Election results ==
Parliament of Malaysia
Year	Constituency	Candidate	Votes	Pct	Opponent(s)	Votes	Pct	Ballots cast	Majority	Turnout
1999	P016 Baling	Taib Azamudden Md Taib (PAS)	21,468	51.68%	Bahador Shah Md Isa (UMNO)	20,074	48.32%	42,534	1,394	78.93%
2004	P016 Baling	Taib Azamudden Md Taib (PAS)	28,432	46.54%	Mashitah Ibrahim (UMNO)	32,661	53.46%	62,202	4,229	83.27%
2008	P016 Baling	Taib Azamudden Md Taib (PAS)	36,074	55.90%	Abdul Azeez Abdul Rahim (UMNO)	28,461	44.10%	65,764	7,613	83.47%

Kedah State Legislative Assembly
Year	Constituency	Candidate	Votes	Pct	Opponent(s)	Votes	Pct	Ballots cast	Majority	Turnout
2004	N30 Bayu	Taib Azamudden Md Taib (PAS)	10,558	46.08%	Mohd Salleh Yaacob (UMNO)	12,354	53.92%	23,270	1,786	84.36%

== Honours ==
- Malaysia
  - Member of the Order of the Defender of the Realm (AMN) (1993)
- Kedah
  - Knight Companion of the Order of Loyalty to the Royal House of Kedah (DSDK) – Dato' (2011)
  - Justice of the Peace (JP) (2009)
- Sarawak
  - Companion of the Most Exalted Order of the Star of Sarawak (JBS) (1996)

== See also ==
- Baling (federal constituency)
