= Ahmad Nazlan Idris =

Malaysian politician

Yang Berbahagia Dato' Ahmad Nazlan Idris DIMP
- أحمد نظلان بن إدريس

Chairman of the Perbadanan Usahawan Nasional Berhad
- In office 15 October 2021 – 20 December 2022
- Minister: Noh Omar
- Chief Executive Officer: Izwan Zainuddin
- Preceded by: Noh Omar
- Succeeded by: Acryl Sani Abdullah Sani

Chairman of the Malaysian Rubber Board
- In office 2 April 2020 – 14 April 2021
- Minister: Khairuddin Razali
- Director General: Zairossani Mohd Nor
- Preceded by: Sankara Narayanan Sankaran Nair
- Succeeded by: Raja Idris Raja Kamarudin

Chairman of the Kolej Poly Tech Mara
- In office 2015 – 1 June 2018
- Minister: Idris Jusoh

Member of the Malaysian Parliament for Jerantut
- In office 5 May 2013 – 19 November 2022
- Preceded by: Tengku Azlan Sultan Abu Bakar (BN–UMNO)
- Succeeded by: Khairil Nizam Khirudin (PN–PAS)
- Majority: 4,532 (2013); 5,908 (2018)

Faction represented in Dewan Rakyat
- 2013–2022: Barisan Nasional

Personal details
- Born: Ahmad Nazlan bin Idris; 1 February 1958 (age 68) Jerantut, Pahang, Malaysia
- Citizenship: Malaysian
- Party: United Malays National Organisation (UMNO)
- Other political affiliations: Barisan Nasional (BN)
- Education: Universiti Putra Malaysia
- Occupation: Politician

Ahmad Nazlan bin Idris (Jawi: أحمد نظلان بن إدريس; born 1 February 1958) is a Malaysian politician who served as Chairman of the Perbadanan Usahawan Nasional Berhad (PUNB) from October 2021 to his resignation in December 2022, the Malaysian Rubber Board (MRB) from April 2020 to April 2021 and the Kolej Poly Tech Mara (KPTM) from 2015 to June 2018. He also served as the Member of Parliament (MP) for Jerantut from May 2013 to November 2022. He is a member of the United Malays National Organisation (UMNO), a component party of the Barisan Nasional (BN) coalition. He is also the Division Chief of UMNO of Jerantut.

== Election results ==
Parliament of Malaysia
Year	Constituency	Candidate	Votes	Pct	Opponent(s)	Votes	Pct	Ballots cast	Majority	Turnout
2013	P081 Jerantut	Ahmad Nazlan Idris (UMNO)	26,544	54.67%	Hamzah Jaafar (PAS)	22,012	45.33%	49,600	4,532	84.98%
2018	P081 Jerantut	Ahmad Nazlan Idris (UMNO)	22,640	45.06%	Yohanis Ahmad (PAS)	16,732	33.30%	51,414	5,908	80.83%
2018	P081 Jerantut	Ahmad Nazlan Idris (UMNO)	22,640	45.06%	Wan Mohd Shaharir Wan Abd Jalil (PPBM)	10,877	21.64%	51,414	5,908	80.83%

== Honours ==
- Pahang
  - Knight Companion of the Order of the Crown of Pahang (DIMP) – Dato' (2015)
