= Najmi Ahmad =

Malaysian politician

Yang Berhormat Brigadier General (Rtd) Dato' Najmi Ahmad DSDK PAT JSM KAT KMN PPA MLA
- نجمي أحمد

Member of the Kedah State Executive Council
- In office 20 May 2020 – 14 August 2023 (Religion, Education and Human Resources)
- Monarch: Sallehuddin
- Menteri Besar: Muhammad Sanusi Md Nor
- Preceded by: Ismail Salleh (Religion); Salmee Said (Education & Human Resources)
- Succeeded by: Mohd Azam Abd Samat (Religion & Education); Wong Chia Zhen (Human Resources)
- Constituency: Kupang

Member of the Kedah State Legislative Assembly for Kupang
- Incumbent
- Assumed office 9 May 2018
- Preceded by: Harun Abdul Aziz (BN–UMNO)
- Majority: 1,627 (2018); 19,275 (2023)

Personal details
- Born: Najmi bin Ahmad; 5 March 1951 (age 75) Baling, Kedah, Federation of Malaya (now Malaysia)
- Citizenship: Malaysian
- Party: Malaysian Islamic Party (PAS)
- Other political affiliations: Pakatan Rakyat (PR) (2008–2015); Gagasan Sejahtera (GS) (2016–2020); Perikatan Nasional (PN) (since 2020)
- Education: Al Azhar University
- Occupation: Politician

Military service
- Allegiance: Malaysia
- Branch: Malaysian Army
- Service years: 1986–2006
- Rank: Brigadier General
- Unit: Military Religious Corps
- Commands: Director of the Religious Corps

Najmi bin Ahmad is a Malaysian politician who has served as Member of the Kedah State Legislative Assembly (MLA) for Kupang since May 2018. He served as Member of the Kedah State Executive Council (EXCO) in the Perikatan Nasional (PN) state administration under Menteri Besar Muhammad Sanusi Md Nor from May 2020 to August 2023. He is a member of the Malaysian Islamic Party (PAS), a component party of the PN and formerly Gagasan Sejahtera (GS) as well as Pakatan Rakyat (PR) coalitions.

== Election results ==
Parliament of Malaysia
Year	Constituency	Candidate	Votes	Pct	Opponent(s)	Votes	Pct	Ballots cast	Majority	Turnout
2013	P016 Baling	Najmi Ahmad (PAS)	38,319	46.86%	Abdul Azeez Abdul Rahim (UMNO)	43,504	53.17%	83,109	5,185	89.20%

Kedah State Legislative Assembly
Year	Constituency	Candidate	Votes	Pct	Opponent(s)	Votes	Pct	Ballots cast	Majority	Turnout
2018	N31 Kupang	Najmi Ahmad (PAS)	13,290	45.64%	Harun Abdul Aziz (UMNO)	11,663	40.05%	29,630	1,627	86.10%
2018	N31 Kupang	Najmi Ahmad (PAS)	13,290	45.64%	Johari Abdullah (AMANAH)	4,168	14.31%	29,630	1,627	86.10%
2023	N31 Kupang	Najmi Ahmad (PAS)	26,366	78.81%	Mohd Suhaimi Hamzah (AMANAH)	7,091	21.19%	33,747	19,275	79.00%

== Honours ==
- Malaysia
  - Companion of the Order of Loyalty to the Crown of Malaysia (JSM) (2003)
  - Officer of the Order of the Defender of the Realm (KMN) (1995)
  - Recipient of the General Service Medal (PPA)
  - Recipient of the 11th Yang di-Pertuan Agong Installation Medal (1999)
  - Recipient of the 12th Yang di-Pertuan Agong Installation Medal (2002)
- Malaysian Armed Forces
  - Warrior of the Most Gallant Order of Military Service (PAT)
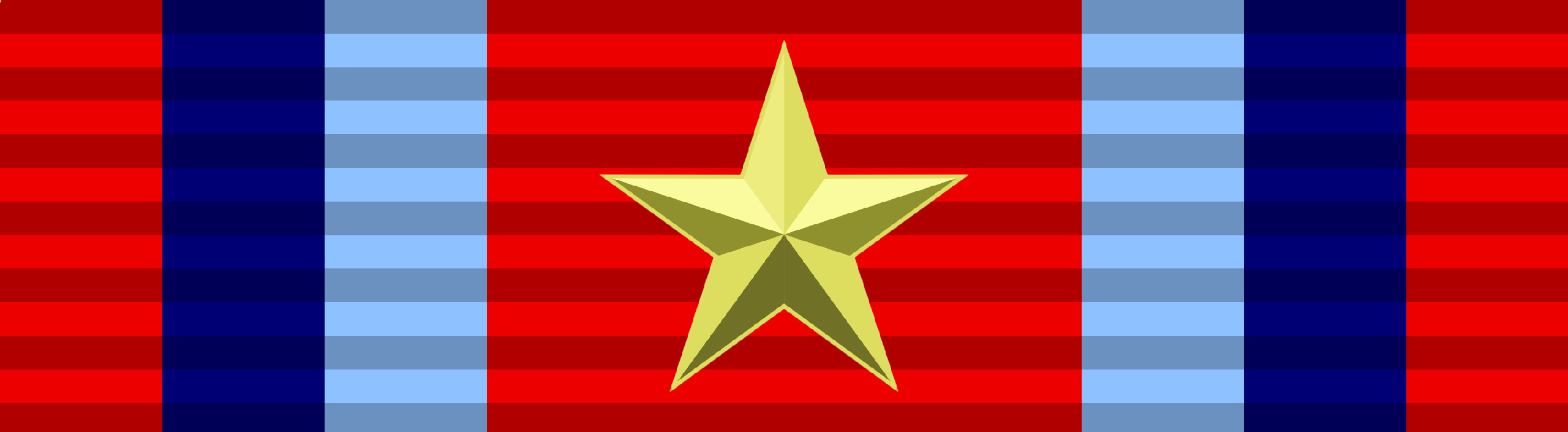
  - Officer of the Most Gallant Order of Military Service (KAT)
- Kedah
  - Knight Companion of the Order of Loyalty to the Royal House of Kedah (DSDK) – Dato' (2002)
  - Recipient of the Sultan Sallehuddin Installation Medal (2018)
