= Skills Development Fund Corporation =

Malaysian government agency

- Perbadanan Tabung Pembangunan Kemahiran
- Logo of the PTPK

Statutory body overview
- Formed: 1 June 2006; 20 years ago
- Jurisdiction: Government of Malaysia
- Headquarters: Menara Dato' Onn, 45, Jalan Tun Ismail 50350 Kuala Lumpur, Federal Territory of Kuala Lumpur, Malaysia
- Minister responsible: Steven Sim Chee Keong, Minister of Human Resources
- Deputy Minister responsible: Abdul Rahman Mohamad, Deputy Minister of Human Resources
- Statutory body executives: Zahir Hassan, Chairman; Rajiv Rishyakaran, Deputy Chairman; Abdul Halim Muhammad Salleh, Chief Executive
- Parent Statutory body: Ministry of Human Resources
- Website: www.ptpk.gov.my

Skills Development Fund Corporation (Malay: Perbadanan Tabung Pembangunan Kemahiran) commonly known by the acronym PTPK is a Malaysian Statutory Body under the Ministry of Human Resources. It is responsible for providing financial assistance in the form of loans to individuals such as school leavers, graduates and others who are interested in pursuing Malaysian Skills Certification (SKM), Malaysian Skills Diploma (DKM) and Malaysian Advanced Skills Diploma (DLKM) at Public or Private Skills Training Providers accredited by DSD.

== Vision ==
To become the main financier of the country's skills training.

== Mission ==
To prepare and manage ongoing skills training funds effectively and efficiently

== Objective ==
To provide sufficient annual funding to finance skills training and collecting repayment based on schedule.
