= Hassan Saad (politician) =

Malaysian politician

Yang Berhormat Ustaz Hassan Saad MP
- حسن سعد

Member of the Malaysian Parliament for Baling
- Incumbent
- Assumed office 19 November 2022
- Preceded by: Abdul Azeez Abdul Rahim (BN–UMNO)
- Majority: 29,137 (2022)

Personal details
- Born: Hassan bin Saad Kampung Tanjung Kupang, Baling, Kedah, Malaysia
- Party: Malaysian Islamic Party (PAS)
- Other political affiliations: Perikatan Nasional (PN)
- Spouse: Zunaidah Shahabudin
- Children: 10
- Occupation: Politician

Ustaz Hassan bin Saad is a Malaysian politician who has served as the Member of Parliament (MP) for Baling since November 2022. He is a member of the Malaysian Islamic Party (PAS), a component party of the Perikatan Nasional (PN) coalition.

== Election results ==
Parliament of Malaysia
Year	Constitiuency	Candidate	Votes	Pct	Opponent(s)	Votes	Pct	Ballots cast	Majority	Turnout
2018	P016 Baling	Hassan Saad (PAS)	37,483	41.41%	Abdul Azeez Abdul Rahim (UMNO)	38,557	42.60%	92,128	1,074	85.93%
2018	P016 Baling	Hassan Saad (PAS)	37,483	41.41%	Mohd Taufik Yaacob (BERSATU)	14,472	15.99%	92,128	1,074	85.93%
2022	P016 Baling	Hassan Saad (PAS)	64,493	59.13%	Abdul Azeez Abdul Rahim (UMNO)	35,356	32.42%	110,353	29,137	82.75%
2022	P016 Baling	Hassan Saad (PAS)	64,493	59.13%	Johari Abdullah (AMANAH)	8,636	7.92%	110,353	29,137	82.75%
2022	P016 Baling	Hassan Saad (PAS)	64,493	59.13%	Basir Ab Rahman (PUTRA)	579	0.53%	110,353	29,137	82.75%

== Honours ==
=== Honours of Malaysia ===
- Malaysia
  - Recipient of the 17th Yang di-Pertuan Agong Installation Medal (2024)

== See also ==
- Baling (federal constituency)
