= Kupang (state constituency) =

State constituency in Kedah, Malaysia

Kupang (N31)
Kedah constituency

State constituency
- Legislature: Kedah State Legislative Assembly
MLA
Najmi Ahmad
PN
- Constituency created: 1974
- First contested: 1974
- Last contested: 2023

Demographics
- Electors (2023): 42,720

Kupang is a state constituency in Kedah, Malaysia, that has been represented in the Kedah State Legislative Assembly.

== Demographics ==
Ethnic breakdown of Kupang's electorate as of 2023
1. Malay (92.3%)
2. Chinese (3.35%)
3. Indian (2.50%)
4. Other ethnicities (1.81%)

== History ==
=== Polling districts ===
According to the gazette issued on 30 March 2018, the Kupang constituency has a total of 26 polling districts.

State constituency	Polling districts	Code	Location
Kupang (N31）	Charok Salang	016/31/01	SK Lanai
Kupang (N31）	Kampung Asam Jawa	016/31/02	SK Asam Jawa
Kupang (N31）	Charok Kelian	016/31/03	SK Asam Jawa
Kupang (N31）	Sungai Limau	016/31/04	SK Titi Gantong
Kupang (N31）	Charok Bemban	016/31/05	SMK Syed Abu Bakar
Kupang (N31）	Gua Reban	016/31/06	SK Seberang Ketil
Kupang (N31）	Kampung Padang	016/31/07	SK Kampung Padang
Kupang (N31）	Lanai	016/31/08	SK Lanai
Kupang (N31）	Mengkuang	016/31/09	SMA Tabriah Islamiah (Nadi)
Kupang (N31）	Lubok Kabu	016/31/10	SMK Kuala Pegang
Kupang (N31）	Kuala Pegang	016/31/11	SK Kuala Pegang
Kupang (N31）	Kampung Raha	016/31/12	SK Kuala Kupang
Kupang (N31）	Kampung Landak	016/31/13	SJK (C) Seng Yok
Kupang (N31）	Pekan Kupang	016/31/14	SK Kampung Keda
Kupang (N31）	Kuala Chenerai	016/31/15	SJK (C) Chin Hwa
Kupang (N31）	Ketemba	016/31/16	SK Kuala Pegang
Kupang (N31）	Kampung Sadek	016/31/17	SK Kampung Sadek
Kupang (N31）	Bukit Terabak	016/31/18	SMA (Arab) Diniah Islamiyah
Kupang (N31）	Simpang Jerai	016/31/19	SMK Jerai
Kupang (N31）	Kampung Tanjong	016/31/20	SK Syed Sheh
Kupang (N31）	Ladang Sungai Tawar	016/31/21	Dewan Orang Ramai (Tokong Hindu) Kampung Dara
Kupang (N31）	Badenoch	016/31/22	SMK Bakai
Kupang (N31）	Ulu Bakai	016/31/23	SK Ulu Bakai
Kupang (N31）	Pekan Malau	016/31/24	SK Malau
Kupang (N31）	Badang	016/31/25	SK Badang
Kupang (N31）	Kampung Sidim	016/31/26	SK Badang

=== Representation history ===
Kedah State Legislative Assemblyman for Kupang
Assembly	No	Years	Member	Party
Constituency created from Baling Barat and Baling Timor
4th	N16	1974–1978	Mohd. Ramli Abdullah	BN (PAS)
5th	N16	1978–1982	Mohd. Ramli Abdullah	PAS
6th	N16	1982–1986	Zainol Md. Isa	BN (UMNO)
7th	N22	1986–1990	Zainol Md. Isa	BN (UMNO)
8th	N22	1990–1995	Zainol Md. Isa	BN (UMNO)
9th	N31	1995–1999	Zainol Md. Isa	BN (UMNO)
10th	N31	1999–2004	Suhaimi Ahmad	PAS
11th	N31	2004–2008	Ismail Abu Bakar	BN (UMNO)
12th	N31	2008–2013	Johari Abdullah	PR (PAS)
13th	N31	2013–2018	Harun Abdul Aziz	BN (UMNO)
14th	N31	2018–2020	Najmi Ahmad	PAS
14th	N31	2020–2023	Najmi Ahmad	PN (PAS)
15th	N31	2023–present	Najmi Ahmad	PN (PAS)

== Election results ==
Kedah state election, 2023
Party	Candidate	Votes	%	∆%
PN	Najmi Ahmad	26,366	78.81	▲78.81
PH	Mohd Suhaime Hamzah	7,091	21.19	▲6.88
Total valid votes		33,457	100.00	
Total rejected ballots		252		
Unreturned ballots		38		
Turnout		33,747	79.00	▼7.10
Registered electors		42,720		
Majority		19,275	56.90	▲51.31
PN hold		Swing		

Kedah state election, 2018
Party	Candidate	Votes	%	∆%
PAS	Najmi Ahmad	13,290	45.64	▼0.79
BN	Harun Abdul Aziz	11,663	40.05	▼13.52
PKR	Johari Abdullah	4,168	14.31	▲14.31
Total valid votes		29,121	100.00	
Total rejected ballots		437		
Unreturned ballots		0		
Turnout		29,630	86.10	▼3.50
Registered electors		34,430		
Majority		1,627	5.59	▼1.55
PAS gain from BN		Swing		?

Kedah state election, 2013
Party	Candidate	Votes	%	∆%
BN	Harun Abdul Aziz	14,427	53.57	▲8.52
PAS	Johari Abdullah	12,503	46.43	▼8.52
Total valid votes		26,930	100.00	
Total rejected ballots		340		
Unreturned ballots		72		
Turnout		27,342	89.60	▲6.05
Registered electors		30,511		
Majority		1,924	7.14	▼2.76
BN gain from PAS		Swing		?

Kedah state election, 2008
Party	Candidate	Votes	%	∆%
PAS	Johari Abdullah	11,627	54.95	▲7.35
BN	Ismail Abu Bakar	9,533	45.05	▼7.35
Total valid votes		21,160	100.00	
Total rejected ballots		334		
Unreturned ballots		0		
Turnout		21,494	83.55	▲0.60
Registered electors		25,726		
Majority		2,094	9.90	▲5.10
PAS gain from BN		Swing		?

Kedah state election, 2004
Party	Candidate	Votes	%	∆%
BN	Ismail Abu Bakar	10,571	52.40	▲9.14
PAS	Suhaimi Ahmad	9,565	47.60	▼9.14
Total valid votes		20,136	100.00	
Total rejected ballots		296		
Unreturned ballots		22		
Turnout		20,454	82.95	▲4.44
Registered electors		24,659		
Majority		1,006	4.80	▼8.68
BN gain from PAS		Swing		?

Kedah state election, 1999
Party	Candidate	Votes	%	∆%
PAS	Suhaimi Ahmad	12,801	56.74	▲7.74
BN	Abd. Wahab Din	9,758	43.26	▼7.74
Total valid votes		22,559	100.00	
Total rejected ballots		434		
Unreturned ballots		0		
Turnout		22,993	78.51	▲3.05
Registered electors		29,285		
Majority		3,043	13.48	▲11.48
PAS gain from BN		Swing		?

Kedah state election, 1995
Party	Candidate	Votes	%	∆%
BN	Zainol Md. Isa	10,019	51.00	▼5.03
PAS	Suhaimi Ahmad	9,626	49.00	▲5.03
Total valid votes		19,645	100.00	
Total rejected ballots		399		
Unreturned ballots		21		
Turnout		20,065	75.46	▼2.04
Registered electors		26,590		
Majority		393	2.00	▼10.06
BN hold		Swing		

Kedah state election, 1990
Party	Candidate	Votes	%	∆%
BN	Zainol Md. Isa	9,345	56.03	▼0.56
PAS	Suhaimi Ahmad	7,332	43.97	▲0.56
Total valid votes		16,677	100.00	
Total rejected ballots		468		
Unreturned ballots		0		
Turnout		17,145	77.50	▲1.59
Registered electors		22,122		
Majority		2,013	12.06	▼1.12
BN hold		Swing		

Kedah state election, 1986
Party	Candidate	Votes	%	∆%
BN	Zainol Md. Isa	8,549	56.59	▲1.87
PAS	Awang Md. Hasan	6,558	43.41	▼1.87
Total valid votes		15,107	100.00	
Total rejected ballots		552		
Unreturned ballots		0		
Turnout		15,659	75.91	▼1.68
Registered electors		20,628		
Majority		1,991	13.18	▼3.74
BN hold		Swing		

Kedah state election, 1982
Party	Candidate	Votes	%	∆%
BN	Zainol Md. Isa	10,021	58.46	▲9.83
PAS	Mohd. Ramli Abdullah	7,121	41.54	▼9.83
Total valid votes		17,142	100.00	
Total rejected ballots		338		
Unreturned ballots		0		
Turnout		17,480	77.59	▲0.03
Registered electors		22,572		
Majority		2,900	16.92	▲14.18
BN gain from PAS		Swing		?

Kedah state election, 1978
Party	Candidate	Votes	%	
PAS	Mohd. Ramli Abdullah	7,652	51.37	▲51.37
BN	Hussin Md Zain	7,245	48.63	▲48.63
Total valid votes		14,897	100.00	
Total rejected ballots		589		
Unreturned ballots		0		
Turnout		15,486	77.56	
Registered electors		19,964		
Majority		407	2.74	
PAS gain from BN		Swing		?

Kedah state election, 1974
Party	Candidate	Votes	%	∆%
On Nomination Day, Mohd. Ramli Abdullah won uncontested.
BN	Mohd. Ramli Abdullah			
Total valid votes			100.00	
Total rejected ballots				
Unreturned ballots				
Turnout				
Registered electors		17,809		
Majority				
This was a new constituency created.
