= Ahmad Fadhli Shaari =

Malaysian politician (born 1981)

Yang Berhormat Tuan Ahmad Fadhli Shaari JMK MP
- أحمد فضلي بن شعاري
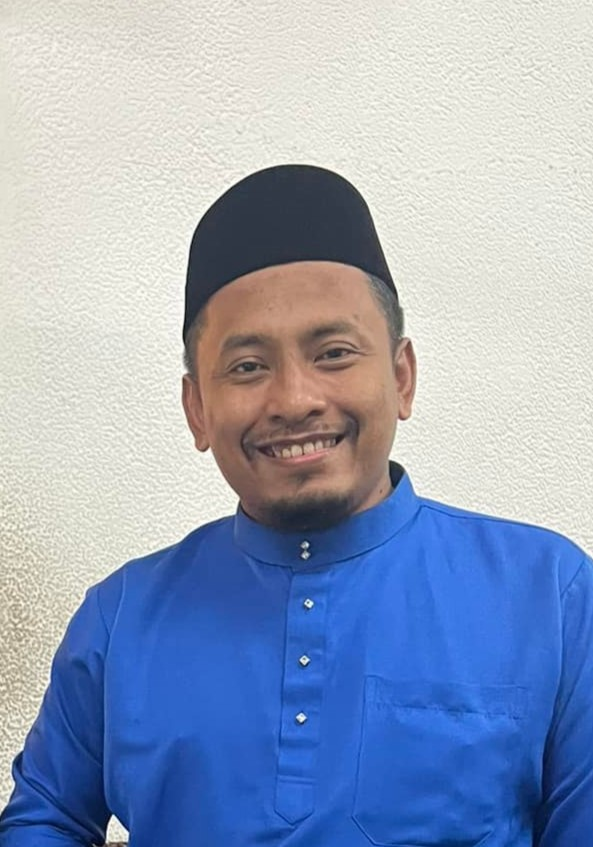
- Ahmad Fadhli in 2022

Information Chief of the Malaysian Islamic Party
- Incumbent
- Assumed office 22 November 2023
- President: Abdul Hadi Awang
- Preceded by: Khairil Nizam Khirudin

Youth Chief of the Perikatan Nasional
- In office 27 January 2022 – 20 January 2024
- Chairman: Muhyiddin Yassin
- Preceded by: Khairil Nizam Khirudin
- Succeeded by: Afnan Hamimi Taib Azamudden

Youth Chief of the Malaysian Islamic Party
- In office 1 November 2021 – 19 October 2023
- President: Abdul Hadi Awang
- Deputy: Afnan Hamimi Taib Azamudden
- Preceded by: Khairil Nizam Khirudin
- Succeeded by: Afnan Hamimi Taib Azamudden

Deputy Youth Chief of the Malaysian Islamic Party
- In office 24 June 2019 – 1 November 2021
- President: Abdul Hadi Awang
- Youth Chief: Khairil Nizam Khirudin
- Preceded by: Khairil Nizam Khirudin
- Succeeded by: Afnan Hamimi Taib Azamuddin

Member of the Malaysian Parliament for Pasir Mas
- Incumbent
- Assumed office 9 May 2018
- Preceded by: Nik Mohamad Abduh Nik Abdul Aziz (PR–PAS)
- Majority: 13,075 (2018); 30,717 (2022)

Faction represented in Dewan Rakyat
- 2018–2020: Malaysian Islamic Party
- 2020–present: Perikatan Nasional

Other roles
- 2020–2022: Chairman of Skills Development Fund Corporation

Personal details
- Born: Ahmad Fadhli bin Shaari; 18 July 1981 (age 45) Pasir Mas, Kelantan, Malaysia
- Party: Malaysian Islamic Party (PAS)
- Other political affiliations: Gagasan Sejahtera (GS) (2016–2020); Perikatan Nasional (PN) (since 2020)
- Spouse: Nor Yani Mohd Salleh
- Education: Al-Azhar University
- Occupation: Politician

Ahmad Fadhli bin Shaari (Jawi: أحمد فضلي بن شعاري; born 18 July 1981) is a Malaysian politician who has served as Member of Parliament (MP) for Pasir Mas since May 2018 and Chairman of the Skills Development Fund Corporation (PTPK) from 2020 to 2022. He is a member of the Malaysian Islamic Party (PAS), a component party of the Perikatan Nasional (PN) coalition. He has also served as the Information Chief of PAS since November 2023. He served as the Youth Chief of PN from January 2022 to January 2024. Ahmad Fadhli also served as the Youth Chief and Deputy Youth Chief of PAS from November 2021 to October 2023 and from June 2019 to November 2021 respectively.

== Early life and education ==
Ahmad Fadhli was born on 18 July 1980 in Pasir Mas, Kelantan.

He received his early education at Maahad Tahfiz Al-Quran Wal Qiraat Pulai Chondong from 1992 to 1999 and then went on to further his studies at the Sultan Ismail Petra International Islamic College (KIAS) in the state capital of Kota Bahru from 1999 to 2002. Later, he furthered his tertiary education at the Islamic Religious Studies faculty of the al-Azhar University in Cairo, Egypt from 2003 to 2005.

== Political career ==
Ahmad Fadhli served as the Youth Chief of PN from January 2022 to January 2024, Youth Chief and Deputy Youth Chief of PAS from November 2021 to October 2023 and from June 2019 to his promotion in November 2021 respectively. As MP for Pasir Mas, he infamously called for a total ban of international concerts in Malaysia. He claimed Coldplay encourages the culture of hedonism in calling for the cancellation of the Coldplay concert in Kuala Lumpur in November 2023. He also defended the selective boycott of Western goods, because he says PAS representatives cannot afford to boycott Mercedes-Benz, IPhone and Facebook. In July 2024, he claimed that monopole transmission towers built parallel to the Penang Bridge resembled rockets, a symbol of the Democratic Action Party that ruled Penang.

== Personal life ==
Ahmad Fadhli had married Nor Yani Mohd Salleh with whom he has had six children.

== Election results ==
Parliament of Malaysia
Year	Constituency	Candidate	Votes	Pct	Opponent(s)	Votes	Pct	Ballots cast	Majority	Turnout
2018	P022 Pasir Mas	Ahmad Fadhli Shaari (PAS)	28,080	52.44%	Nor Azmawi Ab Rahman (UMNO)	15,005	28.02%	55,319	13,075	77.67%
2018	P022 Pasir Mas	Ahmad Fadhli Shaari (PAS)	28,080	52.44%	Ibrahim Ali (IND)	5,373	10.03%	55,319	13,075	77.67%
2018	P022 Pasir Mas	Ahmad Fadhli Shaari (PAS)	28,080	52.44%	Che Ujang Che Daud (PKR)	5,093	9.51%	55,319	13,075	77.67%
2022	P022 Pasir Mas	Ahmad Fadhli Shaari (PAS)	44,444	68.21%	Abdul Ghani Harun (UMNO)	13,727	21.07%	66,145	30,717	68.91%
2022	P022 Pasir Mas	Ahmad Fadhli Shaari (PAS)	44,444	68.21%	Husam Musa (AMANAH)	6,439	9.88%	66,145	30,717	68.91%
2022	P022 Pasir Mas	Ahmad Fadhli Shaari (PAS)	44,444	68.21%	Nasrul Ali Hassan Abdul Latif (PUTRA)	543	0.83%	66,145	30,717	68.91%

== Honours ==
=== Honours of Malaysia ===
- Malaysia
  - Recipient of the 17th Yang di-Pertuan Agong Installation Medal (2024)
- Kelantan
  - Companion of the Order of the Life of the Crown of Kelantan (JMK) (2025)
