= Khairil Nizam Khirudin =

Malaysian politician

Yang Berhormat Ts. Ir. Khairil Nizam Khirudin JMN MP
- خيرالنظام خيرالدين
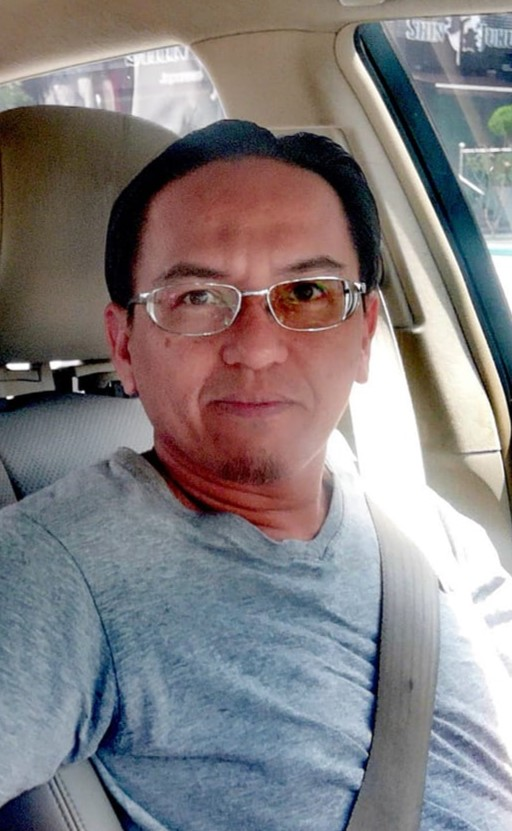
- Khairil Nizam in 2020

Information Chief of the Malaysian Islamic Party
- In office 23 November 2021 – 22 November 2023
- President: Abdul Hadi Awang
- Preceded by: Kamaruzaman Mohamad
- Succeeded by: Ahmad Fadhli Shaari

Youth Chief of the Perikatan Nasional
- In office 9 November 2020 – 27 January 2022
- Deputy: Wan Ahmad Fayhsal Wan Ahmad Kamal
- Chairman: Muhyiddin Yassin
- Preceded by: Position established
- Succeeded by: Ahmad Fadhli Shaari

Youth Chief of the Malaysian Islamic Party
- In office 19 June 2019 – 1 November 2021
- President: Abdul Hadi Awang
- Deputy: Ahmad Fadhli Shaari
- Preceded by: Muhammad Khalil Abdul Hadi
- Succeeded by: Ahmad Fadhli Shaari

Senator Appointed by the Yang di-Pertuan Agong
- In office 28 December 2020 – 5 November 2022
- Monarch: Abdullah
- Prime Minister: Muhyiddin Yassin (2020–2021); Ismail Sabri Yaakob (2021–2022)

Member of the Malaysian Parliament for Jerantut
- Incumbent
- Assumed office 19 November 2022
- Preceded by: Ahmad Nazlan Idris (BN–UMNO)
- Majority: 8,092 (2022)

Faction represented in Dewan Negara
- 2020–2022: Perikatan Nasional

Faction represented in Dewan Rakyat
- 2022–: Perikatan Nasional

Personal details
- Born: Khairil Nizam bin Khirudin; 16 October 1979 (age 46) Ipoh, Perak, Malaysia
- Citizenship: Malaysian
- Party: Malaysian Islamic Party (PAS)
- Other political affiliations: Gagasan Sejahtera; Muafakat Nasional; Perikatan Nasional
- Education: Universiti Teknologi Petronas (BEng, MSc)
- Occupation: Politician
- Profession: Engineer

Khairil Nizam bin Khirudin (Jawi: خيرالنظام بن خيرالدين; born 16 October 1979) is a Malaysian politician and engineer who has served as the Member of Parliament (MP) for Jerantut since November 2022. He had served as a Senator from December 2020 to his resignation in November 2022 to contest in the 2022 Malaysian general election. He is a member of the Malaysian Islamic Party (PAS), a component party of the Perikatan Nasional (PN) coalition. He has also served as the Information Chief of PAS since November 2021. He served as the Youth Chief of PN from November 2020 to January 2022 and of PAS from June 2019 to November 2021.

== Election results ==
Parliament of Malaysia
Year	Constituency	Candidate	Votes	Pct	Opponent(s)	Votes	Pct	Ballots cast	Majority	Turnout
2018	P098 Gombak	Khairil Nizam Khirudin (PAS)	17,537	14.73%	Mohamed Azmin Ali (PKR)	75,113	63.10%	119,975	48,721	85.43%
2018	P098 Gombak	Khairil Nizam Khirudin (PAS)	17,537	14.73%	Abdul Rahim Pandak Kamaruddin (UMNO)	26,392	22.17%	119,975	48,721	85.43%
2022	P081 Jerantut	Khairil Nizam Khirudin (PAS)	31,701	47.49%	Mohd Zukarmi Abu Bakar (UMNO)	23,609	35.37%	66,754	8,092	76.68%
2022	P081 Jerantut	Khairil Nizam Khirudin (PAS)	31,701	47.49%	Hassan Basri Awang Mat Dahan (PKR)	11,444	17.14%	66,754	8,092	76.68%

== Honours and awards ==
=== Honours of Malaysia ===
- Malaysia
  - Companion of the Order of the Defender of the Realm (JMN) (2021)
  - Recipient of the 17th Yang di-Pertuan Agong Installation Medal (2024)

=== Career recognition ===
1. International certification: API 510 (Pressure Vessel Inspection Code), API 570 (Piping Inspection Code), API 580 (Risk Based Inspection), API 653 (Tank Inspection, Repair, Alteration and Reconstruction)
2. Malaysia certification: OSR Inspector (Pressure Vessel and Crane)
