= Kamaruzaman Mohamad =

- Born: 23 November 1961
- Died: April 2014 (aged 52–53)
- Other names: Also known as Pok Me'

Kamaruzaman Mohamad (1961 — April 28, 2014) was a Malaysian journalist and editor for Utusan Malaysia.

In 2000, Mohamad won the Kajai Award for being the first Malaysian journalist to penetrate the Militant Islamist separatist group Abu Sayyaf.

Mohamad died on April 28, 2014, at Subang Jaya Medical Centre from a kidney ailment. He was 53.
