= Azman Ibrahim (politician) =

Malaysian politician

Yang Berhormat Dato' Dr. Azman Ibrahim DPMT AMZ MLA
- عزمان بن إبراهيم

Member of the Terengganu State Executive Council (Agriculture, Agro-based Industry and Rural Development)
- Incumbent
- Assumed office 10 May 2018
- Monarch: Mizan Zainal Abidin
- Menteri Besar: Ahmad Samsuri Mokhtar
- Deputy Member: Hilmi Harun
- Constituency: Jabi

Member of the Terengganu State Legislative Assembly for Jabi
- Incumbent
- Assumed office 9 May 2018
- Preceded by: Mohd Iskandar Jaafar (BN–UMNO)
- Majority: 55 (2018); 4,676 (2023)

Faction represented in Terengganu State Legislative Assembly
- 2018–2020: Malaysian Islamic Party
- 2020–: Perikatan Nasional

Other roles
- 2020–: Chairman of National Kenaf and Tobacco Board

Personal details
- Born: Azman bin Ibrahim; 20 September 1974 (age 51) Terengganu, Malaysia
- Citizenship: Malaysian
- Party: Malaysian Islamic Party (PAS)
- Other political affiliations: Perikatan Nasional (PN); Gagasan Sejahtera (GS); Pakatan Rakyat (PR)
- Occupation: Politician

Yang Berhormat Dato' Dr. Azman bin Ibrahim (born 20 September 1974) is a Malaysian politician who has served as Member of the Terengganu State Executive Council (EXCO) in the Perikatan Nasional (PN) state administration under Menteri Besar Ahmad Samsuri Mokhtar, Member of the Terengganu State Legislative Assembly (MLA) for Jabi since May 2018 and Chairman of the National Kenaf and Tobacco Board since 2020. He is a member of the Malaysian Islamic Party (PAS), a component party of the PN coalition.

== Political career ==
=== Member of the Terengganu State Legislative Assembly (since 2018) ===
In the 2008 Terengganu state election, Azman made his electoral debut after being nominated by PAS to contest for the Jabi state seat. He lost to Barisan Nasional (BN) candidate by a minority of 804 votes.

In the 2013 Terengganu state election, Azman was renominated to contest for the Jabi seat. He again lost to BN candidate by a minority of 782 votes.

In the 2018 Terengganu state election, Azman was renominated by PAS to contest for the Jabi seat. He finally won the seat and was elected as the Jabi MLA for the first term after narrowly defeating defending incumbent MLA Mohd Iskandar Jaafar of BN and candidate of Pakatan Harapan (PH) by a majority of only 55 votes.

In the 2023 Terengganu state election, he defeated his opponent, which is Rosdi Zakaria of BN.

=== Member of the Terengganu State Executive Council (since 2018) ===
On 10 May 2018 after PAS took over the state administration from BN after PAS defeated BN in the 2018 Terengganu state election, Azman was appointed as Terengganu EXCO Member in charge of Agriculture, Agro-based Industry and Rural Development by Menteri Besar Ahmad Samsuri.

== Controversies ==
=== Sexist remarks against women ===
On 7 February 2023, Azman used an analogy to liken women to an item, leading him to criticisms by Malaysian netizens. Former Inspector-General of Police (IGP) Musa Hassan refuted that "It doesn't matter how one should dress. It is the duty of the police to receive reports in whatever situation.", while rage among netizens soar. However, Azman justified his claim and refused to apologise.

=== Racist remarks against Malaysian Chinese ===
In January 2023, Azman made a "sarcastic" remark by referring the stabilisation of pork prices as "fate of the Chinese people". Netizens criticised Azman by describing that as a racist remark against Chinese minority as non-Muslims in the nation consume pork. In February 2023, after authorities were called to investigate the illegal and controversial "jihad march" organised by PAS in earlier February 2023, Azman defended the actions of his party comrades and compatriots by tweeting a picture of a Chinese immigrant working as a coachman for Malays with the description "Once upon a time in my homeland...", hinting that the Chinese people should not be treated as equal as Malays are. This led him to huge criticised not only by Malay and Chinese netizens, but also from the Malaysian Chinese Association (MCA), a component party of the BN coalition. Some slammed Azman for "insinuating the low status of Chinese in the past", while some believed that PAS was trying to incite hatred against ethnic minorities in the nation.

== Election results ==
Terengganu State Legislative Assembly
Year	Constituency	Candidate	Votes	Pct	Opponent(s)	Votes	Pct	Ballots cast	Majority	Turnout
2008	N05 Jabi	Azman Ibrahim (PAS)	5,560	46.63%	Ramlan Ali (UMNO)	6,364	53.37%	12,075	804	85.82%
2013	N05 Jabi	Azman Ibrahim (PAS)	6,953	47.34%	Mohd Iskandar Jaafar (UMNO)	7,735	52.66%	14,830	782	88.60%
2018	N05 Jabi	Azman Ibrahim (PAS)	8,061	48.10%	Mohd Iskandar Jaafar (UMNO)	8,006	47.78%	17,144	55	85.50%
2018	N05 Jabi	Azman Ibrahim (PAS)	8,061	48.10%	Abd Rahman @ Abdul Aziz Abas (AMANAH)	690	4.12%	17,144	55	85.50%
2023	N05 Jabi	Azman Ibrahim (PAS)	11,523	62.73%	Ustaz Di @ Rosdi Zakaria (UMNO)	6,847	37.27%	18,486	4,676	73.38%

== Honours ==
- Terengganu
  - Knight Commander of the Order of the Crown of Terengganu (DPMT) – Dato' (2025)
  - Member of the Order of Sultan Mizan Zainal Abidin of Terengganu (AMZ) (2019)
