= Badrol Hisham Hashim =

Malaysian politician

Yang Berbahagia Dato' Badrol Hisham Hashim DSDK AMK BKM PJK

Member of the Kedah State Executive Council
- In office 22 February 2016 – 10 May 2018
- Monarch: Abdul Halim
- Menteri Besar: Ahmad Bashah Md Hanipah
- Portfolio: Housing, Local Government, Water Supply, Water Resources and Energy
- Preceded by: Himself (Local Government, Water Supply, Water Resources and Energy); Portfolio abolished (Non-Governmental Organisation)
- Succeeded by: Tan Kok Yew (Housing, Local Government); Zamri Yusuf (Water Supply, Water Resources and Energy)
- Constituency: Kuala Nerang
- In office 11 May 2015 – 22 February 2016
- Monarch: Abdul Halim
- Menteri Besar: Mukhriz Mahathir
- Portfolio: Local Government, Water Supply, Water Resources and Energy, Non-Governmental Organisation
- Preceded by: Himself (Local Government, Water Supply, Water Resources and Energy); Aminuddin Omar (Non-Governmental Organisation)
- Succeeded by: Himself (Local Government, Water Supply, Water Resources and Energy); Portfolio abolished (Non-Governmental Organisation)
- Constituency: Kuala Nerang
- In office 15 May 2013 – 11 May 2015
- Monarch: Abdul Halim
- Menteri Besar: Mukhriz Mahathir
- Portfolio: Local Government, Water Supply, Water Resources and Energy, Housing and Human Development
- Preceded by: Phahrolrazi Mohd Zawawi (Housing, Local Government, Water Supply, Water Resources and Energy); Ismail Salleh (Human Development)
- Succeeded by: Himself (Local Government, Water Supply, Water Resources and Energy); Tajul Urus Mat Zain (Housing); Aminuddin Omar (Human Development)
- Constituency: Kuala Nerang

Member of the Kedah State Legislative Assembly for Kuala Nerang
- In office 5 May 2013 – 9 May 2018
- Preceded by: Syed Sobri Syed Hashim (BN–UMNO)
- Succeeded by: Mohamad Yusoff Zakaria (GS–PAS)
- Majority: 1,997 (2013)

Personal details
- Party: United Malays National Organisation (UMNO)
- Other political affiliations: Barisan Nasional (BN)

Badrol Hisham bin Hashim is a Malaysian politician who as Member of the Kedah State Executive Council (EXCO) in the Barisan Nasional (BN) state administration under former Menteri Besar Mukhriz Mahathir from May 2013 to February 2016 and Ahmad Bashah Md Hanipah from February 2016 to the collapse of the BN state administration in May 2018 as well as Member of the Kedah State Legislative Assembly (MLA) for Kuala Nerang from May 2013 to May 2018. He is a member of the United Malays National Organisation (UMNO), a component party of the Barisan Nasional (BN) coalitions.

== Political career ==
=== Candidate for the Kedah State Legislative Assembly (2013) ===
In the 2013 state election, Badrol Hisham made his electoral debut after being nominated by BN to contest for the Kuala Nerang state seat. Badrol Hisham is contesting against Syed Ibrahim Syed Omar of PAS and Ahmad Mad Daud of Independent politician. He won the seat by gaining 10,363 votes with the majority of 1,997.

=== Member of the Kedah State Executive Council (2013–2018) ===
Badrol Hisham was appointed Member of the Kedah State Executive Council (EXCO) by Menteri Besar Mukhriz Mahathir in charge of Local Government, Water Supply, Water Resources and Energy, Housing and Human Development. In 2015, he was appointed in charge of Local Government, Water Supply, Water Resources and Energy, Non-Governmental Organisation. In 2016, he was reappointed EXCO by Menteri Besar Ahmad Bashah Md Hanipah in charge of Housing, Local Government, Water Supply, Water Resources and Energy.

=== Candidate for the Kedah State Legislative Assembly (2018) ===
In the 2018 state election, Badrol Hisham was nominated by BN to defend for the Kuala Nerang state seat. Badrol Hisham is contesting against Mohamad Yusoff Zakaria of PAS and Syed Fadzil Syed Embun of Pakatan Harapan. He unsuccessfully the seat by gaining 7,499 votes with the majority of 1,619.

== Election results ==
Kedah State Legislative Assembly
| Year | Constituency | Candidate | Votes | Pct | Opponent(s) | Votes | Pct | Ballots cast | Majority | Turnout |
|---|---|---|---|---|---|---|---|---|---|---|
| 2013 | N07 Kuala Nerang | Badrol Hisham Hashim (UMNO) | 10,363 | 54.65% | Syed Ibrahim Syed Omar (PAS) | 8,366 | 44.12% | 19,393 | 1,997 | 89.60% |
| 2013 | N07 Kuala Nerang | Badrol Hisham Hashim (UMNO) | 10,363 | 54.65% | Ahmad Mad Daud (IND) | 235 | 1.24% | 19,393 | 1,997 | 89.60% |
| 2018 | N07 Kuala Nerang | Badrol Hisham Hashim (UMNO) | 7,499 | 37.51% | Mohamad Yusoff Zakaria (PAS) | 9,118 | 45.61% | 20,436 | 1,619 | 84.80% |
| 2018 | N07 Kuala Nerang | Badrol Hisham Hashim (UMNO) | 7,499 | 37.51% | Syed Fadzil Syed Embun (BERSATU) | 3,376 | 16.89% | 20,436 | 1,619 | 84.80% |

== Honours ==
- Kedah
  - Knight Companion of the Order of Loyalty to the Royal House of Kedah (DSDK) – Dato' (2015)
  - Companion of the Order of the Crown of Kedah (SMK) (2014)
  - Member of the Order of the Crown of Kedah (AMK)
  - Recipient of the Public Service Star (BKM) (2003)
  - Recipient of the Meritorious Service Medal (PJK)
