= Abdul Ghani Ahmad =

Malaysian politician

Yang Berhormat Abd Ghani Ahmad SMK JP MP
- عبد غني أحمد

Member of the Malaysian Parliament for Jerlun
- Incumbent
- Assumed office 19 November 2022
- Preceded by: Mukhriz Mahathir (PH–BERSATU)
- Majority: 20,456 (2022)

Member of the Kedah State Executive Council
- In office 10 March 2010 – 6 May 2013
- Monarch: Abdul Halim
- Menteri Besar: Azizan Abdul Razak
- Portfolio: Information, Human Development and Entrepreneur Development
- Preceded by: Ismail Salleh (Information and Human Development); Phahrolrazi Mohd Zawawi (Entrepreneur Development)
- Succeeded by: Mohd Tajudin Abdullah (Information); Badrol Hisham Hashim (Human Development); Suraya Yaacob (Entrepreneur Development)
- Constituency: Ayer Hitam

Member of the Kedah State Legislative Assembly for Ayer Hitam
- In office 8 March 2008 – 5 May 2013
- Preceded by: Othman Aziz (BN–UMNO)
- Succeeded by: Mukhriz Mahathir (BN–UMNO)
- Majority: 506 (2008)
- In office 29 November 1999 – 21 March 2004
- Preceded by: Abd Rahman Ariffin (BN–UMNO)
- Succeeded by: Othman Aziz (BN–UMNO)
- Majority: 144 (1999)

Personal details
- Born: 3 June 1970 (age 56) Kedah, Malaysia
- Party: Malaysian Islamic Party (PAS)
- Other political affiliations: Barisan Alternatif (BA); Pakatan Rakyat (PR); Perikatan Nasional (PN)
- Occupation: Politician
- Website: https://pkwr-ayerhitam.blogspot.com/

Abd Ghani bin Ahmad (born 3 June 1970) is a Malaysian politician who has served as the Member of Parliament (MP) for Jerlun since November 2022. He served as Member of the Kedah State Executive Council (EXCO) in the Pakatan Rakyat (PR) state administration under former Menteri Besar Azizan Abdul Razak from March 2010 to the collapse of the PR state administration in May 2013 as well as Member of the Kedah State Legislative Assembly (MLA) for Ayer Hitam from November 1999 to March 2004 and again from March 2008 to May 2018. He is a member of the Malaysian Islamic Party (PAS), a component party of the Perikatan Nasional (PN) and formerly PR coalitions.

He holds Doctor of Philosophy in industry and Bachelor's Degree in Islamic Studies (Syariah) at the Universiti Kebangsaan Malaysia (UKM).

== Political career ==
Abd Ghani was first elected to the Kedah Assembly for Ayer Hitam in the 1999 state election, but was defeated in 2004 by Othman Aziz of Barisan Nasional (BN).

In the 2008 state election, Abd Ghani regained the seat in a rematch against Othman. With PR defeating BN in the 2008 state election and seeing the first ever transition of power in the history of Kedah as well as ending the 60-year rule of BN of the state, Abdul Ghani was appointed as an Kedah EXCO Member by Menteri Besar Azizan in March 2010.

In the 2013 state election, BN regained power by defeating PR and Abd Ghani also lost his state seat to Mukhriz Mahathir of BN.

In the 2018 general election, Abd Ghani moved to the federal politics and lost to Mukhriz again, but of Pakatan Harapan (PH) in the contest for the Jerlun federal seat.

In the 2022 general election, Abd Ghani defeated defending MP Mukhriz of the Homeland Fighters Party (PEJUANG) and other candidates in the contest for the same federal seat.

== Election results ==
Kedah State Legislative Assembly
Year	Constituency	Candidate	Votes	Pct	Opponent(s)	Votes	Pct	Ballots cast	Majority	Turnout
1999	N04 Ayer Hitam	Abd Ghani Ahmad (PAS)	8,558	49.34%	Abdul Rahman Ariffin (UMNO)	8,414	48.51%	17,346	144	78.30%
2004	N04 Ayer Hitam	Abd Ghani Ahmad (PAS)	9,899	47.28%	Othman Aziz (UMNO)	10,759	51.39%	20,935	860	83.94%
2008	N04 Ayer Hitam	Abd Ghani Ahmad (PAS)	10,652	50.31%	Othman Aziz (UMNO)	10,146	47.92%	21,171	506	82.24%
2013	N04 Ayer Hitam	Abd Ghani Ahmad (PAS)	11,637	45.07%	Mukhriz Mahathir (UMNO)	14,083	54.55%	26,200	2,446	88.61%

Parliament of Malaysia
Year	Constituency	Candidate	Votes	Pct	Opponent(s)	Votes	Pct	Ballots cast	Majority	Turnout
2018	P005 Jerlun	Abd Ghani Ahmad (PAS)	12,829	28.72%	Mukhriz Mahathir (BERSATU)	18,695	41.86%	44,660	5,866	83.00%
2018	P005 Jerlun	Abd Ghani Ahmad (PAS)	12,829	28.72%	Othman Aziz (UMNO)	12,413	27.79%	44,660	5,866	83.00%
2022	P005 Jerlun	Abd Ghani Ahmad (PAS)	31,685	60.69%	Othman Aziz (UMNO)	11,229	21.51%	52,207	20,456	77.23%
2022	P005 Jerlun	Abd Ghani Ahmad (PAS)	31,685	60.69%	Mohamed Fadzli Mohd Ali (PKR)	6,149	11.78%	52,207	20,456	77.23%
2022	P005 Jerlun	Abd Ghani Ahmad (PAS)	31,685	60.69%	Mukhriz Mahathir (PEJUANG)	3,144	6.02%	52,207	20,456	77.23%

== Honours ==
=== Honours of Malaysia ===
- Malaysia
  - Recipient of the 17th Yang di-Pertuan Agong Installation Medal (2024)
- Kedah
  - Companion of the Order of the Crown of Kedah (SMK) (2009)
  - Justice of the Peace (JP) (2011)
