= Kuala Kedah (federal constituency) =

Federal constituency of Kedah, Malaysia

Kuala Kedah (P010)
Kedah constituency

Federal constituency
- Legislature: Dewan Rakyat
- MP: Ahmad Fakhruddin Fakhrurazi; PN
- Constituency created: 1958
- First contested: 1959
- Last contested: 2022

Demographics
- Population (2020): 172,099
- Electors (2023): 132,959
- Area (km²): 233
- Pop. density (per km²): 738.6

Kuala Kedah is a federal constituency in Kota Setar District, Kedah, Malaysia, that has been represented in the Dewan Rakyat since 1959.

The federal constituency was created in the 1958 redistribution and is mandated to return a single member to the Dewan Rakyat under the first past the post voting system.

== Demographics ==
Ethnic breakdown of Kuala Kedah's electorate as of 2022
1. Malay (76.2%)
2. Chinese (22.4%)
3. Indian (1.10%)
4. Other ethnicities (0.20%)

As of 2020, Kuala Kedah has a population of 172,099 people.

Age breakdown of Kuala Kedah's electorate as of 2022
1. 18-20 (6.06%)
2. 21-29 (21.5%)
3. 30-39 (22.4%)
4. 40-49 (17.4%)
5. 50-59 (13.8%)
6. 60-69 (11.4%)
7. 70-79 (5.45%)
8. 80-89 (1.77%)
9. above 90 (0.27%)
Gender breakdown of Kuala Kedah's electorate as of 2022
1. Male (49.1%)
2. Female (50.9%)

== History ==
=== Polling districts ===
According to the federal gazette issued on 18 July 2023, the Kuala Kedah constituency is divided into 52 polling districts.

State constituency	Polling Districts	Code	Location
Anak Bukit (N15）	Titi Gajah	010/15/01	SK Titi Gajah
Anak Bukit (N15）	Alor Ganu	010/15/02	SJK (T) Thiruvalluvar
Anak Bukit (N15）	Alor Madi	010/15/03	SJK (T) Thiruvalluvar
Anak Bukit (N15）	Kota Rentang	010/15/04	SK Kota Rentang
Anak Bukit (N15）	Permatang Kong	010/15/05	SK Seri Muda
Anak Bukit (N15）	Kubang Raja	010/15/06	SK Simpang Tiga
Anak Bukit (N15）	Padang Hang	010/15/07	SK Simpang Tiga
Anak Bukit (N15）	Padang Lalang	010/15/08	SMK Alor Janggus
Anak Bukit (N15）	Gunong	010/15/09	SMK Seri Gunong
Anak Bukit (N15）	Kubang Tedoh	010/15/10	SJK (C) Yih Choon
Anak Bukit (N15）	Taman Aman	010/15/11	SK Taman Aman
Anak Bukit (N15）	Pekan Anak Bukit	010/15/12	Dewan Kementerian Dalam Negeri Anak Bukit
Anak Bukit (N15）	Kampung Anak Bukit	010/15/13	SJK (C) Soon Jian
Anak Bukit (N15）	Pantai Johor	010/15/14	SMK Tunku Abdul Malik
Anak Bukit (N15）	Chegar	010/15/15	SK Gunong
Anak Bukit (N15）	Alor Melintang	010/15/16	SK Sri Gunong
Anak Bukit (N15）	Sungai Baru	010/15/17	SK Sungai Baru
Anak Bukit (N15）	Mergong	010/15/18	SMA Kedah
Kubang Rotan (N16）	Kuar Jawa	010/16/01	SK Hj Abdullah Sadun
Kubang Rotan (N16）	Kubang Jawi	010/16/02	SK Alor Janggus
Kubang Rotan (N16）	Kubang Jambu	010/16/03	SJK (C) Long Seong
Kubang Rotan (N16）	Kubang Rotan	010/16/04	SMK Kubang Rotan
Kubang Rotan (N16）	Seberang Kota	010/16/05	SK Kuala Kedah
Kubang Rotan (N16）	Kampung Bahru	010/16/06	SJK (C) Pei Shih
Kubang Rotan (N16）	Pekan Kuala Kedah	010/16/07	SMK Seri Pantai
Kubang Rotan (N16）	Taman Sri Putra	010/16/08	SK Seri Pantai
Kubang Rotan (N16）	Kampung Tengah	010/16/09	SK Haji Ismail
Kubang Rotan (N16）	Kampung Balai	010/16/10	SK Haji Salleh Masri
Kubang Rotan (N16）	Kubang Panggas	010/16/11	SK Dato' Shaari
Kubang Rotan (N16）	Telok Chengai	010/16/12	SMK Tengku Laksamana
Kubang Rotan (N16）	Taman Seri Ampang	010/16/13	SMJK Keat Hwa II
Kubang Rotan (N16）	Taman Pelangi	010/16/14	SJK (C) Pei Hwa
Kubang Rotan (N16）	Peremba	010/16/15	SK Peremba
Kubang Rotan (N16）	Taman Sultan Badlishah	010/16/16	SMK Seberang Perak
Kubang Rotan (N16）	Taman Malek	010/16/17	SMJK Keat Hwa I
Pengkalan Kundor（N17）	Telok Kechai	010/17/01	SK Telok Kechai
Pengkalan Kundor（N17）	Taman Sophia	010/17/02	SMK Tun Sharifah Rodziah
Pengkalan Kundor（N17）	Taman Bersatu	010/17/03	SK Taman Bersatu
Pengkalan Kundor（N17）	Telok Bagan	010/17/04	SR Islam Darul Ulum (SRIDU)
Pengkalan Kundor（N17）	Kebun Pinang	010/17/05	SK Kebun Pinang
Pengkalan Kundor（N17）	Tebengau	010/17/06	SK Tebengau
Pengkalan Kundor（N17）	Kampung Benua	010/17/07	SJK (C) Eik Choon
Pengkalan Kundor（N17）	Taman Cengkeh	010/17/08	SJK (C) Yih Min
Pengkalan Kundor（N17）	Simpang Empat	010/17/09	SK Hj Hasan Itam
Pengkalan Kundor（N17）	Selarong Panjang	010/17/10	SMK Tuanku Abdul Aziz
Pengkalan Kundor（N17）	Permatang Ibus	010/17/11	SK Kangkong
Pengkalan Kundor（N17）	Kuala Sala	010/17/12	SK Sri Mahawangsa
Pengkalan Kundor（N17）	Sala Kechil	010/17/13	SK Kampung Jawa
Pengkalan Kundor（N17）	Selarong Batang	010/17/14	SMA Ihya Ul-Ulum Ad Diniah
Pengkalan Kundor（N17）	Buloh Lima	010/17/15	SK Buluh Lima
Pengkalan Kundor（N17）	Taman Impian	010/17/16	SMK Muadzam Shah
Pengkalan Kundor（N17）	Kota Sarang Samut	010/17/17	SJK (C) Min Sin

=== Representation history ===
Members of Parliament for Kuala Kedah
Parliament	No	Years	Member	Party	Vote Share
Constituency created from Alor Star
Parliament of the Federation of Malaya
1st	P007	1959–1963	Tunku Abdul Rahman Putra Sultan Abdul Hamid Halim Shah (تونكو عبد الرحمٰن ڤوترا سلطان عبد الحميد حليم شاه)	Alliance (UMNO)	13,032; 70.16%
Parliament of Malaysia
1st	P007	1963–1964	Tunku Abdul Rahman Putra Sultan Abdul Hamid Halim Shah (تونكو عبد الرحمٰن ڤوترا سلطان عبد الحميد حليم شاه)	Alliance (UMNO)	13,032; 70.16%
2nd	P007	1964–1969	Tunku Abdul Rahman Putra Sultan Abdul Hamid Halim Shah (تونكو عبد الرحمٰن ڤوترا سلطان عبد الحميد حليم شاه)	Alliance (UMNO)	17,109; 75.80%
		1969–1971	Parliament was suspended		
3rd	P007	1971–1973	Tunku Abdul Rahman Putra Sultan Abdul Hamid Halim Shah (تونكو عبد الرحمٰن ڤوترا سلطان عبد الحميد حليم شاه)	Alliance (UMNO)	15,468; 56.39%
3rd	P007	1973	Senu Abdul Rahman (سنو بن عبدالرحمٰن)	Alliance (UMNO)	16,471; 61.27%
3rd	P007	1973–1974	Senu Abdul Rahman (سنو بن عبدالرحمٰن)	BN (UMNO)	16,471; 61.27%
4th	P006	1974–1978	Senu Abdul Rahman (سنو بن عبدالرحمٰن)	BN (UMNO)	15,958; 70.22%
5th	P006	1978–1982	Senu Abdul Rahman (سنو بن عبدالرحمٰن)	BN (UMNO)	14,907; 50.98%
6th	P006	1982–1986	Mohammad Abu Bakar Rautin Ibrahim (محمّد أبو بكر راوتين إبراهيم)	BN (UMNO)	18,624; 55.28%
7th	P008	1986–1990	Mohammad Abu Bakar Rautin Ibrahim (محمّد أبو بكر راوتين إبراهيم)	BN (UMNO)	15,992; 53.26%
8th	P008	1990–1995	Mohammad Abu Bakar Rautin Ibrahim (محمّد أبو بكر راوتين إبراهيم)	BN (UMNO)	17,397; 54.05%
9th	P010	1995–1999	Zakaria Mohd Said (زكريا محمد سعيد)	BN (UMNO)	22,209; 53.60%
10th	P010	1999–2004	Mohamad Sabu (محمد سابو)	BA (PAS)	23,548; 51.07%
11th	P010	2004–2008	Hashim Jahaya (هشيم جاهيا)	BN (UMNO)	36,707; 58.08%
12th	P010	2008–2013	Ahmad Kassim (أحمد قاسم)	PR (PKR)	35,689; 55.45%
13th	P010	2013–2015	Azman Ismail (عزمان إسماعيل)	PR (PKR)	42,870; 53.06%
13th	P010	2015–2018	Azman Ismail (عزمان إسماعيل)	PH (PKR)	42,870; 53.06%
14th	P010	2018–2022	Azman Ismail (عزمان إسماعيل)	PH (PKR)	36,624; 46.26%
15th	P010	2022–present	Ahmad Fakhruddin Fakhrurazi (أحمد فخرالدين فخرالراضي)	PN (PAS)	56,298; 56.03%

=== State constituency ===
Parliamentary constituency	State constituency						
Parliamentary constituency	1955–1959*	1959–1974	1974–1986	1986–1995	1995–2004	2004–2018	2018–present
Kuala Kedah				Alor Janggus			
Kuala Kedah			Anak Bukit		Anak Bukit		
Kuala Kedah					Kubang Rotan		
Kuala Kedah			Pengkalan Kundor				
Kuala Kedah		Kota Star Barat					
Kuala Kedah		Langkawi					

=== Historical boundaries ===
State Constituency	Area					
State Constituency	1959	1974	1984	1994	2003	2018
Alor Janggus			Alor Janggus; Kampung Simpang Empat Kuar; Kampung Telok Binasa; Kuala Kedah; Kubang Rotan			
Anak Bukit		Alor Janggus; Anak Bukit; Kampung Simpang Empat Kuar; Kampung Telok Binasa; Kubang Rotan		Anak Bukit; Alor Melintang; Kampung Simpang Empat Kuar; Taman Seri Indah; Titi Gajah		Anak Bukit; Alor Melintang; Rentang; Taman Seri Indah; Titi Gajah
Kubang Rotan				Kampung Cina; Kampung Sematang Pinang; Kampung Telok Layang; Kuala Kedah; Kubang Rotan		Kampung Cina; Kampung Simpang Empat Kuar; Kampung Telok Layang; Kuala Kedah; Kubang Rotan
Pengkalan Kundor		Kuala Kedah; Pengkalan Kundor; Simpang Empat; Taman Merpati; Tandop	Kampung Sungai Nonang; Kota Sarang Semut; Simpang Empat; Taman Merpati; Tandop	Kampung Sungai Nonang; Kota Sarang Semut; Pengkalan Kundor; Simpang Empat; Tandop		
Kota Star Barat	Anak Bukit; Kampung Simpang Empat Kuar; Mergong; Simpang Empat; Tandop					
Langkawi	Ayer Hangat; Kuah; Kuala Kedah; Kubang Rotan; Padang Matsirat					

=== Current state assembly members ===
No.	State Constituency	Member	Coalition (Party)
N15	Anak Bukit	Rashidi Razak	PN (PAS)
N16	Kubang Rotan	Mohd Salleh Saidin	PN (BERSATU)
N17	Pengkalan Kundor	Mardhiyyah Johari	PN (PAS)

=== Local governments & postcodes ===
No.	State Constituency	Local Government	Postcode
N15	Anak Bukit	Alor Setar City Council	05050, 05150, 05400, 05680, 06250, 06550, 06570, 06600, 06650 Alor Setar; 06700 Pendang
N16	Kubang Rotan	Alor Setar City Council	05050, 05150, 05400, 05680, 06250, 06550, 06570, 06600, 06650 Alor Setar; 06700 Pendang
N17	Pengkalan Kundor	Alor Setar City Council	05050, 05150, 05400, 05680, 06250, 06550, 06570, 06600, 06650 Alor Setar; 06700 Pendang

== Election results ==
Malaysian general election, 2022
Party	Candidate	Votes	%	∆%
PN	Ahmad Fakhruddin Fakhrurazi	56,298	56.03	▲56.03
PH	Azman Ismail	28,237	28.10	▲28.10
BN	Mashitah Ibrahim	13,879	13.81	▼10.70
PEJUANG	Ulya Aqamah Husamudin	1,805	1.80	▲1.80
Heritage	Syed Araniri Syed Ahmad	256	0.25	▲0.25
Total valid votes		100,475	100.00	
Total rejected ballots		811		
Unreturned ballots		224		
Turnout		101,510	76.60	▼5.81
Registered electors		132,500		
Majority		28,061	27.93	▲10.90
PN gain from PKR		Swing		?
Source(s) https://lom.agc.gov.my/ilims/upload/portal/akta/outputp/1753260/PUB%20606%20(2022).pdf

Malaysian general election, 2018
Party	Candidate	Votes	%	∆%
PKR	Azman Ismail	36,624	46.26	▼6.80
PAS	Muhammad Riduan Othman	23,143	29.23	▲29.23
BN	Abdullah Hasnan Kamaruddin	19,400	24.51	▼22.43
Total valid votes		79,167	100.00	
Total rejected ballots		1,111		
Unreturned ballots		277		
Turnout		80,555	82.41	▼3.87
Registered electors		97,753		
Majority		13,481	17.03	▲10.91
PKR hold		Swing		
Source(s) "His Majesty's Government Gazette - Notice of Contested Election, Parliament for the State of Kedah [P.U. (B) 233/2018]" (PDF). Attorney General's Chambers of Malaysia. 3 May 2018. "Federal Government Gazette - Results of Contested Election and Statements of the Poll after the Official Addition of Votes, Parliamentary Constituencies for the State of Kedah [P.U. (B) 307/2018]" (PDF). Attorney General's Chambers of Malaysia. 28 May 2018.

Malaysian general election, 2013
Party	Candidate	Votes	%	∆%
PKR	Azman Ismail	42,870	53.06	▼2.39
BN	Zaki Zamani Abd Rashid	37,923	46.94	▲2.39
Total valid votes		80,793	100.00	
Total rejected ballots		1,212		
Unreturned ballots		248		
Turnout		82,253	86.28	▲7.19
Registered electors		95,328		
Majority		4,947	6.12	▼4.78
PKR hold		Swing		
Source(s) "Federal Government Gazette - Notice of Contested Election, Parliament for the State of Kedah [P.U. (B) 170/2013]" (PDF). Attorney General's Chambers of Malaysia. 26 April 2013. Archived from the original (PDF) on 2019-12-29. "Federal Government Gazette - Results of Contested Election and Statements of the Poll after the Official Addition of Votes, Parliamentary Constituencies for the State of Kedah [P.U. (B) 211/2013]" (PDF). Attorney General's Chambers of Malaysia. 22 May 2013.

Malaysian general election, 2008
Party	Candidate	Votes	%	∆%
PKR	Ahmad Kassim	35,689	55.45	▲55.45
BN	Hashim Jahaya	28,671	44.55	▼13.53
Total valid votes		64,360	100.00	
Total rejected ballots		1,385		
Unreturned ballots		5		
Turnout		65,750	79.09	▼2.56
Registered electors		83,132		
Majority		7,018	10.90	▼5.26
PKR gain from BN		Swing		?

Malaysian general election, 2004
Party	Candidate	Votes	%	∆%
BN	Hashim Jahaya	36,707	58.08	▲7.01
PAS	Mohamad Sabu	26,493	41.92	▼7.01
Total valid votes		63,200	100.00	
Total rejected ballots		1,023		
Unreturned ballots		109		
Turnout		64,332	81.65	▲5.11
Registered electors		78,789		
Majority		10,214	16.16	▲14.02
BN gain from PAS		Swing		?

Malaysian general election, 1999
Party	Candidate	Votes	%	∆%
PAS	Mohamad Sabu	23,548	51.07	▲4.67
BN	Fauzi Abdul Hamid	22,557	48.93	▼4.67
Total valid votes		46,105	100.00	
Total rejected ballots		649		
Unreturned ballots		27		
Turnout		46,781	76.54	▲2.31
Registered electors		61,119		
Majority		991	2.14	▼5.06
PAS gain from BN		Swing		?

Malaysian general election, 1995
Party	Candidate	Votes	%	∆%
BN	Zakaria Mohd Said	22,209	53.60	▼0.45
PAS	Ali @ Fadzil Md Noor	19,223	46.40	▲0.45
Total valid votes		41,432	100.00	
Total rejected ballots		1,029		
Unreturned ballots		151		
Turnout		42,612	74.23	▼1.12
Registered electors		57,405		
Majority		2,986	7.20	▼0.90
BN hold		Swing		

Malaysian general election, 1990
Party	Candidate	Votes	%	∆%
BN	Mohammad Abu Bakar Rautin Ibrahim	17,397	54.05	▲0.78
PAS	Halim Arshat	14,792	45.95	▼0.78
Total valid votes		32,189	100.00	
Total rejected ballots		717		
Unreturned ballots		0		
Turnout		32,906	75.35	▲3.22
Registered electors		43,670		
Majority		2,605	8.10	▲1.58
BN hold		Swing		

Malaysian general election, 1986
Party	Candidate	Votes	%	∆%
BN	Mohammad Abu Bakar Rautin Ibrahim	15,992	53.26	▼2.02
PAS	Ali @ Fadzil Md Noor	14,035	46.74	▲7.68
Total valid votes		30,027	100.00	
Total rejected ballots		748		
Unreturned ballots		0		
Turnout		30,775	72.13	▼2.76
Registered electors		42,665		
Majority		1,957	6.52	▼9.70
BN hold		Swing		

Malaysian general election, 1982
Party	Candidate	Votes	%	∆%
BN	Mohammad Abu Bakar Rautin Ibrahim	18,624	55.28	▲4.30
PAS	Mat Din	13,160	39.06	▼8.91
DAP	Wong Kok Wah	1,905	5.65	▲5.65
Total valid votes		33,689	100.00	
Total rejected ballots		854		
Unreturned ballots		0		
Turnout		34,543	74.89	▲0.57
Registered electors		46,123		
Majority		5,464	16.22	▲13.21
BN hold		Swing		

Malaysian general election, 1978
Party	Candidate	Votes	%	∆%
BN	Senu Abdul Rahman	14,907	50.98	▼26.01
PAS	Ali @ Fadzil Md Noor	14,028	47.97	▲47.97
Independent	Yaacob @ Salleh Abdullah	308	1.05	▲1.05
Total valid votes		29,243	100.00	
Total rejected ballots		814		
Unreturned ballots		0		
Turnout		30,057	74.32	▲6.88
Registered electors		40,445		
Majority		879	3.01	▼54.20
BN hold		Swing		

Malaysian general election, 1974
Party	Candidate	Votes	%	∆%
BN	Senu Abdul Rahman	15,958	70.22	▲70.22
Parti Rakyat Malaysia	Wan Khazim @ Wan Hussein Wan Din	4,099	18.04	▲18.04
Independent	Mohamed Isa Hussein	2,670	11.75	▲11.75
Total valid votes		22,727	100.00	
Total rejected ballots		1,070		
Unreturned ballots		0		
Turnout		23,797	67.44	▲0.57
Registered electors		35,288		
Majority		11,859	57.21	▲34.67
BN gain from Alliance Party (Malaysia) Party (Malaysia)		Swing		?

Malaysian general by-election, 20 January 1973 Upon the resignation of incumbent, Tunku Abdul Rahman
Party	Candidate	Votes	%	∆%
Alliance	Senu Abdul Rahman	16,471	61.27	▲4.88
Independent	Siti Nor Hamid Tuah	10,410	38.73	▲38.73
Total valid votes		26,881	100.00	
Total rejected ballots		264		
Unreturned ballots		0		
Turnout		27,145	66.87	▼10.20
Registered electors		40,595		
Majority		6,061	22.54	▲9.76
Alliance hold		Swing		

Malaysian general election, 1969
Party	Candidate	Votes	%	∆%
Alliance	Tunku Abdul Rahman Sultan Abdul Hamid Halim Shah	15,468	56.39	▼19.41
PMIP	Abdul Aziz Abdullah	11,964	43.61	▲19.41
Total valid votes		27,432	100.00	
Total rejected ballots		987		
Unreturned ballots		0		
Turnout		28,419	77.07	▼1.88
Registered electors		36,874		
Majority		3,504	12.78	▼38.82
Alliance hold		Swing		

Malaysian general election, 1964
Party	Candidate	Votes	%	∆%
Alliance	Tunku Abdul Rahman Sultan Abdul Hamid Halim Shah	17,109	75.80	▲5.02
PMIP	Mustaffa Mohd Said	5,462	24.20	▼5.02
Total valid votes		22,571	100.00	
Total rejected ballots		1,014		
Unreturned ballots		0		
Turnout		23,585	78.95	▲6.42
Registered electors		29,872		
Majority		11,647	51.60	▲11.28
Alliance hold		Swing		

Malayan general election, 1959
Party	Candidate	Votes	%
Alliance	Tunku Abdul Rahman Sultan Abdul Hamid Halim Shah	13,032	70.16
PMIP	Hassan Abdul Rahman	5,542	29.84
Total valid votes		18,574	100.00
Total rejected ballots		244	
Unreturned ballots		0	
Turnout		18,818	72.53
Registered electors		25,946	
Majority		7,490	40.32
This was a new constituency created.
