= Azhar Ibrahim =

Malaysian politician

Yang Berhormat Tuan Azhar Ibrahim SSS MLA
- أزهر إبراهيم

Member of the Kedah State Legislative Assembly for Ayer Hitam
- Incumbent
- Assumed office 9 May 2018
- Preceded by: Mukhriz Mahathir (BN–UMNO)
- Majority: 537 (2018); 15,973 (2023)

Personal details
- Born: 24 November 1963 (age 62)
- Party: Malaysian Islamic Party (PAS)
- Other political affiliations: Perikatan Nasional (PN)
- Spouse: Salmah Saad
- Children: 3
- Occupation: Politician

Azhar bin Ibrahim is a Malaysian politician who served as Member of the Kedah State Legislative Assembly (MLA) for Ayer Hitam since May 2018. He is a member of Malaysian Islamic Party (PAS), a component party of Perikatan Nasional (PN) coalitions.

== Election results ==
Kedah State Legislative Assembly
| Year | Constituency | Candidate | Votes | Pct | Opponent(s) | Votes | Pct | Ballots cast | Majority | Turnout |
|---|---|---|---|---|---|---|---|---|---|---|
| 2018 | N04 Ayer Hitam | Azhar Ibrahim (PAS) | 9,229 | 36.71% | A.Aziz Mohammad (BERSATU) | 8,692 | 34.57% | 25,631 | 537 | 83.79% |
| 2018 | N04 Ayer Hitam | Azhar Ibrahim (PAS) | 9,229 | 36.71% | Abu Hassan Sharif (UMNO) | 7,220 | 28.72% | 25,631 | 537 | 83.79% |
| 2023 | N04 Ayer Hitam | Azhar Ibrahim (PAS) | 22,078 | 78.34% | Hayazi Azizan (UMNO) | 6,105 | 21.66% | 28,369 | 15,973 | 75.01% |

== Honours ==
- Kedah
  - Companion of the Order of Loyalty to Sultan Sallehuddin of Kedah (SSS) (2025)
