= Jerlun (federal constituency) =

Federal constituency of Kedah, Malaysia

Jerlun (P005)
Kedah constituency

Federal constituency
- Legislature: Dewan Rakyat
- MP: Abdul Ghani Ahmad; PN
- Constituency created: 1994
- First contested: 1995
- Last contested: 2022

Demographics
- Population (2020): 66,086
- Electors (2023): 67,596
- Area (km²): 316
- Pop. density (per km²): 209.1

Jerlun is a federal constituency in Kubang Pasu District, Kedah, Malaysia, that has been represented in the Dewan Rakyat since 1995.

The federal constituency was created in the 1994 redistribution and is mandated to return a single member to the Dewan Rakyat under the first past the post voting system.

== Demographics ==
https://live.chinapress.com.my/ge15/parliament/KEDAH

Ethnic breakdown of Jerlun's electorate as of 2022
1. Malay (91.0%)
2. Chinese (7.00%)
3. Other ethnicities (1.40%)
4. Indian (0.70%)

As of 2020, Jerlun has a population of 66,086 people.

Age breakdown of Jerlun's electorate as of 2022
1. 18-20 (5.66%)
2. 21-29 (19.4%)
3. 30-39 (21.6%)
4. 40-49 (17.4%)
5. 50-59 (15.5%)
6. 60-69 (11.6%)
7. 70-79 (6.38%)
8. 80-89 (2.13%)
9. above 90 (0.31%)
Gender breakdown of Jerlun's electorate as of 2022
1. Male (49.3%)
2. Female (50.7%)

== History ==
=== Polling districts ===
According to the federal gazette issued on 18 July 2023, the Jerlun constituency is divided into 35 polling districts.

State constituency	Polling Districts	Code	Location
Kota Siputeh (N03）	Kampung Bahagia	005/03/01	SMK Tunku Bendahara
Kota Siputeh (N03）	Kampung Pering	005/03/02	SK Siputeh
Kota Siputeh (N03）	Kampung Kandis	005/03/03	SK Kodiang (Baru)
Kota Siputeh (N03）	Pekan Kodiang	005/03/04	SJK (C) Choong Hwa
Kota Siputeh (N03）	Kampung Kodiang	005/03/05	SK Tunku Bendahara
Kota Siputeh (N03）	Kampung Siputeh	005/03/06	SMA Jerlun
Kota Siputeh (N03）	Megat Dewa	005/03/07	SK Megat Dewa
Kota Siputeh (N03）	Bukit Hantu	005/03/08	SK Dato' Syed Nahar
Kota Siputeh (N03）	Mesjid Paya	005/03/09	SK Dato' Syed Nahar
Kota Siputeh (N03）	Batu 4 Jalan Sanglang	005/03/10	Pertubuhan Peladang Kawasan B-2 Sanglang Batu 4, Jalan Sanglang
Kota Siputeh (N03）	Manggol	005/03/11	SK Manggol Bongor
Kota Siputeh (N03）	Tok Kepak	005/03/12	SK Tok Kepak
Kota Siputeh (N03）	Sg Korok 2 Mk Sanglang	005/03/13	SK Haji Wan Yahya, Jalan Sanglang
Kota Siputeh (N03）	Sg Korok	005/03/14	SK Haji Wan Yahya, Jalan Sanglang
Kota Siputeh (N03）	Kampung Sanglang	005/03/15	SK Sanglang
Kota Siputeh (N03）	Kerpan	005/03/16	SJK (C) Lam Min
Kota Siputeh (N03）	Kuala Sanglang	005/03/17	SMK Sanglang
Ayer Hitam (N04)	Padang Sera	005/04/01	SJK (C) Pei Min
Ayer Hitam (N04)	Kampung Melele	005/04/02	SMA Nahdhah Hasanah Melele, Padang Sera
Ayer Hitam (N04)	Kampung Putat	005/04/03	SK Putat
Ayer Hitam (N04)	Kampung Imam	005/04/04	SMK Megat Dewa
Ayer Hitam (N04)	Telaga Batu	005/04/05	SMK Tuanku Seri Indera Putera
Ayer Hitam (N04)	Padang Perahu	005/04/06	SK Padang Perahu
Ayer Hitam (N04)	Kampung Pida	005/04/07	SK Pida Tiga
Ayer Hitam (N04)	Kampung Gurindam	005/04/08	SK Pulau Chapa
Ayer Hitam (N04)	Alor Biak	005/04/09	SJK (C) Yuh Min
Ayer Hitam (N04)	Kubang Sepat	005/04/10	SMA Hidayah Islamiah
Ayer Hitam (N04)	Lana Bulu	005/04/11	SK Dato' Sri Syed Ahmad
Ayer Hitam (N04)	Permatang Paku	005/04/12	SK Matang Paku
Ayer Hitam (N04)	Matang Bonglai	005/04/13	SK Tunku Laksamana
Ayer Hitam (N04)	Jerlun	005/04/14	SMK Jerlun
Ayer Hitam (N04)	Lubok Pinang	005/04/15	SMK Ayer Hitam
Ayer Hitam (N04)	Pekan Ayer Hitam	005/04/16	SJK (C) Yuh Min
Ayer Hitam (N04)	Kampung Gandai	005/04/17	SMK Ayer Hitam
Ayer Hitam (N04)	Kubang Nipah	005/04/18	SK Jerlun

=== Representation history ===
Members of Parliament for Jerlun
Parliament	No	Years	Member	Party	vote Share
Constituency created from Jerlun-Langkawi and Kubang Pasu
9th	P005	1995–1999	Hanafi Ramli (حنفي راملي)	BN (UMNO)	18,012; 55.51%
10th	P005	1999–2004	Abu Bakar Othman (ابو بكر عثمان)	BA (PAS)	17,104; 50.56%
11th	P005	2004–2008	Abdul Rahman Ariffin (عبدالرحمن عريفين)	BN (UMNO)	19,123; 52.97%
12th	P005	2008–2013	Mukhriz Mahathir (مخرج محاضر)	BN (UMNO)	19,424; 53.01%
13th	P005	2013–2018	Othman Aziz (عثمان عزيز)	BN (UMNO)	24,161; 53.63%
14th	P005	2018–2020	Mukhriz Mahathir (مخرج محاضر)	PH (BERSATU)	18,695; 42.55%
14th	P005	2020	Mukhriz Mahathir (مخرج محاضر)	BERSATU	18,695; 42.55%
14th	P005	2020	Mukhriz Mahathir (مخرج محاضر)	Independent	18,695; 42.55%
14th	P005	2020–2022	Mukhriz Mahathir (مخرج محاضر)	PEJUANG	18,695; 42.55%
15th	P005	2022–present	Abdul Ghani Ahmad (عبدالغني احمد)	PN (PAS)	31,685; 60.69%

=== State constituency ===
Parliamentary constituency	State constituency						
Parliamentary constituency	1955–1959*	1959–1974	1974–1986	1986–1995	1995–2004	2004–2018	2018–present
Jerlun					Ayer Hitam		
Jerlun					Kota Siputeh		

=== Historical boundaries ===
State Constituency	Area		
State Constituency	1994	2003	2018
Ayer Hitam	Ayer Hitam; Jerlun; Kerpan; Sanglang; Sungai Korok	Ayer Hitam; Jerlun; Kampung Putat; Padang Perahu; Sungai Korok	
Kota Siputeh	Kodiang; Kota Siputeh; Megat Dewa; Padang Sira; Sungai Korok	Kerpan; Kodiang; Kota Siputeh; Megat Dewa; Sanglang	

=== Current state assembly members ===
No.	State Constituency	Member	Coalition (Party)
N03	Kota Siputeh	Mohd Ashraf Mustaqim Badrul Munir	PN (BERSATU)
N04	Ayer Hitam	Azhar Ibrahim	PN (PAS)

=== Local governments & postcodes ===
No.	State Constituency	Local Government	Postcode
N03	Kota Siputeh	Kubang Pasu Municipal Council	06000 Jitra; 06100 Kodiang; 06150 Ayer Hitam
N04	Ayer Hitam	Kubang Pasu Municipal Council	06000 Jitra; 06100 Kodiang; 06150 Ayer Hitam

== Election results ==
Malaysian general election, 2022
Party	Candidate	Votes	%	∆%
PN	Abdul Ghani Ahmad	31,685	60.69	▲60.69
BN	Othman Aziz	11,229	21.51	▼6.74
PH	Mohamed Fadzli Mohd Ali	6,149	11.78	▲11.78
PEJUANG	Mukhriz Mahathir	3,144	6.02	▲6.02
Total valid votes		52,207	100.00	
Total rejected ballots		617		
Unreturned ballots		18		
Turnout		52,909	77.23	▼5.57
Registered electors		67,601		
Majority		20,456	39.18	▲25.83
PN gain from PKR		Swing		?
Source(s) https://lom.agc.gov.my/ilims/upload/portal/akta/outputp/1753260/PUB%20606%20(2022).pdf

Malaysian general election, 2018
Party	Candidate	Votes	%	∆%
PKR	Mukhriz Mahathir	18,695	42.55	▲42.55
PAS	Abdul Ghani Ahmad	12,829	29.20	▼17.17
BN	Othman Aziz	12,413	28.25	▼25.38
Total valid votes		43,937	100.00	
Total rejected ballots		723		
Unreturned ballots		162		
Turnout		44,822	82.80	▼4.82
Registered electors		54,132		
Majority		5,866	13.35	▲6.09
PKR gain from BN		Swing		?
Source(s) "His Majesty's Government Gazette - Notice of Contested Election, Parliament for the State of Kedah [P.U. (B) 233/2018]" (PDF). Attorney General's Chambers of Malaysia. 3 May 2018. "Federal Government Gazette - Results of Contested Election and Statements of the Poll after the Official Addition of Votes, Parliamentary Constituencies for the State of Kedah [P.U. (B) 307/2018]" (PDF). Attorney General's Chambers of Malaysia. 28 May 2018.

Malaysian general election, 2013
Party	Candidate	Votes	%	∆%
BN	Othman Aziz	24,161	53.63	▲0.62
PAS	Ismail Salleh	20,891	46.37	▼0.62
Total valid votes		45,052	100.00	
Total rejected ballots		730		
Unreturned ballots		117		
Turnout		45,899	87.62	▲5.67
Registered electors		52,383		
Majority		3,270	7.26	▲1.24
BN hold		Swing		
Source(s) "Federal Government Gazette - Notice of Contested Election, Parliament for the State of Kedah [P.U. (B) 170/2013]" (PDF). Attorney General's Chambers of Malaysia. 26 April 2013. Archived from the original (PDF) on 2019-12-29. "Federal Government Gazette - Results of Contested Election and Statements of the Poll after the Official Addition of Votes, Parliamentary Constituencies for the State of Kedah [P.U. (B) 211/2013]" (PDF). Attorney General's Chambers of Malaysia. 22 May 2013.

Malaysian general election, 2008
Party	Candidate	Votes	%	∆%
BN	Mukhriz Mahathir	19,424	53.01	▲0.04
PAS	Idris Ahmad	17,219	46.99	▼0.04
Total valid votes		36,643	100.00	
Total rejected ballots		599		
Unreturned ballots		55		
Turnout		37,297	81.95	▼1.46
Registered electors		45,513		
Majority		2,205	6.02	▲0.08
BN hold		Swing		

Malaysian general election, 2004
Party	Candidate	Votes	%	∆%
BN	Abdul Rahman Ariffin	19,123	52.97	▲3.53
PAS	Idris Ahmad	16,981	47.03	▼3.53
Total valid votes		36,104	100.00	
Total rejected ballots		718		
Unreturned ballots		0		
Turnout		36,822	83.41	▲5.15
Registered electors		44,145		
Majority		2,142	5.94	▲4.82
BN gain		Swing		

Malaysian general election, 1999
Party	Candidate	Votes	%	∆%
PAS	Abu Bakar Othman	17,104	50.56	▼4.95
BN	Ismail Taib	16,724	49.44	▲4.95
Total valid votes		33,828	100.00	
Total rejected ballots		595		
Unreturned ballots		13		
Turnout		34,436	78.26	▲2.02
Registered electors		44,002		
Majority		380	1.12	▼9.90
PAS gain from BN		Swing		?

Malaysian general election, 1995
Party	Candidate	Votes	%
BN	Hanafi Ramli	18,012	55.51
PAS	Halim Arshat	14,436	44.49
Total valid votes		32,448	100.00
Total rejected ballots		975	
Unreturned ballots		28	
Turnout		33,451	76.24
Registered electors		43,875	
Majority		3,576	11.02
This was a new constituency created.
