= Azman Ismail =

Malaysian politician

- عزمان إسماعيل

Chairman of the Malaysian Agricultural Research and Development Institute
- Incumbent
- Assumed office 10 May 2023
- Minister: Mohamad Sabu
- Director-General: Mohamad Zabawi Abdul Ghani

Member of the Malaysian Parliament for Kuala Kedah
- In office 5 May 2013 – 19 November 2022
- Preceded by: Ahmad Kassim (PR–PKR)
- Succeeded by: Ahmad Fakhruddin Fakhrurazi (PN–PAS)
- Majority: 4,947 (2013); 13,481 (2018)

Faction represented in Dewan Rakyat
- 2013–2018: People's Justice Party
- 2018–2022: Pakatan Harapan

Personal details
- Born: Azman bin Ismail; 1961 (age 64–65) Kedah
- Citizenship: Malaysia
- Party: People's Justice Party (PKR)
- Other political affiliations: Pakatan Rakyat (PR) (2008–2015); Pakatan Harapan (PH) (since 2015)
- Education: Universiti Sains Malaysia
- Occupation: Politician
- Profession: Physician
- Azman Ismail on Parliament of Malaysia

Azman bin Ismail (Jawi: عزمن بن إسماعيل) is a Malaysian politician and physician who served as the Member of Parliament (MP) for Kuala Kedah from May 2013 to November 2022. He is a member of the People's Justice Party (PKR), a component party of the Pakatan Harapan (PH) and formerly Pakatan Rakyat (PR) coalitions.

Before entering politics, Azman was a General Practitioner (GP). He entered Parliament after winning the Kuala Kedah federal seat in the 2013 general election, replacing the Ahmad Kassim as the party's candidate. At the election, Azman defeated the Barisan Nasional (BN) candidate and fellow medical doctor Zaki Zamani Abd Rashid by 4,947 votes. In the 2018 general election, he was re-elected as the MP for Kuala Kedah. In the 2022 general election, he lost the seat to Ahmad Fakhruddin Fakhrurazi of Perikatan Nasional (PN).

== Election results ==
Parliament of Malaysia
Year	Constituency	Candidate	Votes	Pct	Opponent(s)	Votes	Pct	Ballots cast	Majority	Turnout
2013	P010 Kuala Kedah	Azman Ismail (PKR)	42,870	53.06%	Zaki Zamani Abd Rashid (UMNO)	37,923	46.94%	82,253	4,947	86.28%
2018	P010 Kuala Kedah	Azman Ismail (PKR)	36,624	46.29%	Muhamad Riduan Mohd Othman (PAS)	23,143	29.25%	80,555	13,481	82.40%
2018	P010 Kuala Kedah	Azman Ismail (PKR)	36,624	46.29%	Abdullah Hasnan Kamaruddin (UMNO)	19,400	24.52%	80,555	13,481	82.40%
2022	P010 Kuala Kedah	Azman Ismail (PKR)	28,237	28.10%	Ahmad Fakhruddin Fakhrurazi (PAS)	56,298	56.03%	101,510	28,061	76.60%
2022	P010 Kuala Kedah	Azman Ismail (PKR)	28,237	28.10%	Mashitah Ibrahim (UMNO)	13,879	13.81%	101,510	28,061	76.60%
2022	P010 Kuala Kedah	Azman Ismail (PKR)	28,237	28.10%	Ulya Aqamah Husamudin (PEJUANG)	1,805	1.80%	101,510	28,061	76.60%
2022	P010 Kuala Kedah	Azman Ismail (PKR)	28,237	28.10%	Syed Araniri Syed Ahmad (WARISAN)	256	0.25%	101,510	28,061	76.60%
