= Mohamad Yusoff Zakaria =

Malaysian politician

Yang Berhormat Dato' Mohamad Yusoff Zakaria DSSS SSS BKM MLA
- محمد يوسف زكريا

Member of the Kedah State Executive Council
- Incumbent
- Assumed office 21 August 2023
- Monarch: Sallehuddin
- Menteri Besar: Muhammad Sanusi Md Nor
- Portfolio: Works, Natural Resources, Water Supply and Environment
- Preceded by: Himself (Public Works and Water Supply); Muhammad Sanusi Md Nor (Natural Resources); Robert Ling Kui Ee (Environment)
- Constituency: Kuala Nerang
- In office 10 November 2022 – 21 August 2023
- Menteri Besar: Muhammad Sanusi Md Nor
- Portfolio: Works, Water Supply and Water Resources, Irrigation and Drainage & Energy
- Preceded by: Suraya Yaacob (Works, Energy, Water Supply and Water Resources); Portfolio established (Irrigation and Drainage)
- Succeeded by: Himself (Works and Water Supply); Portfolio abolished (Energy, Water Resources, Irrigation and Drainage)
- Constituency: Kuala Nerang

Member of the Kedah State Legislative Assembly for Kuala Nerang
- Incumbent
- Assumed office 9 May 2018
- Preceded by: Badrol Hisham Hashim (BN–UMNO)
- Majority: 1,619 (2018); 15,446 (2023)
- In office 29 November 1999 – 21 March 2004
- Preceded by: Abd Lateh Mohd Saman (BN–UMNO)
- Succeeded by: Affifudin Omar (BN–UMNO)
- Majority: 446 (1999)

Personal details
- Born: Mohamad Yusoff bin Zakaria Malaysia
- Party: Malaysian Islamic Party (PAS)
- Other political affiliations: Barisan Alternatif (BA) (1999–2004); Pakatan Rakyat (PR) (2008–2015); Gagasan Sejahtera (GS) (2015–2020); Perikatan Nasional (PN) (2020–present)
- Occupation: Politician

Mohamad Yusoff bin Zakaria is a Malaysian politician who has served as Member of the Kedah State Executive Council (EXCO) in the Perikatan Nasional (PN) state administration under Menteri Besar Muhammad Sanusi Md Nor since November 2022 and Member of the Kedah State Legislative Assembly (MLA) for Kuala Nerang since May 2018. He is a member of the Malaysian Islamic Party (PAS), a component party of the PN coalitions and GS coalitions.

== Election results ==
Kedah State Legislative Assembly
Year	Constituency	Candidate	Votes	Pct	Opponent(s)	Votes	Pct	Ballots cast	Majority	Turnout
1995	N07 Kuala Nerang	Mohamad Yusoff Zakaria (PAS)	5,292	49.95%	Abd Lateh Mohd Saman (UMNO)	5,303	50.05%	10,987	11	76.67%
1999	N07 Kuala Nerang	Mohamad Yusoff Zakaria (PAS)	5,841	51.99%	Abd Lateh Mohd Saman (UMNO)	5,393	48.01%	11,555	446	83.32%
2004	N07 Kuala Nerang	Mohamad Yusoff Zakaria (PAS)	6,436	45.38%	Affifudin Omar (UMNO)	7,746	54.62%	14,432	1,310	86.08%
2018	N07 Kuala Nerang	Mohamad Yusoff Zakaria (PAS)	9,118	45.61%	Badrol Hisham Hashim (UMNO)	7,499	37.51%	20,436	1,619	84.80%
2018	N07 Kuala Nerang	Mohamad Yusoff Zakaria (PAS)	9,118	45.61%	Syed Fadzil Syed Embun (BERSATU)	3,376	16.89%	20,436	1,619	84.80%
2023	N07 Kuala Nerang	Mohamad Yusoff Zakaria (PAS)	19,661	82.35%	Ridzwan Abu Bakar (AMANAH)	4,215	17.65%	24,067	15,446	76.45%

== Honours ==
- Kedah
  - Knight Companion of the Order of Loyalty to Sultan Sallehuddin of Kedah (DSSS) – Dato' (2025)
  - Companion of the Order of Loyalty to Sultan Sallehuddin of Kedah (SSS) (2023)
  - Recipient of the Public Service Star (BKM) (2009)
