= Ahmad Fakhruddin Fakhrurazi =

Malaysian politician

Yang Berhormat Ahmad Fakhruddin Fakhrurazi SDK PJK MP
- أَحْمَد فَخْرُٱلدِّين فَخْرُٱلرَّاضِي

Member of the Malaysian Parliament for Kuala Kedah
- Incumbent
- Assumed office 19 November 2022
- Preceded by: Azman Ismail (PH–PKR)
- Majority: 28,061 (2022)

Personal details
- Born: Ahmad Fakhruddin bin Fakhrurrazi; 27 April 1971 (age 55) Semeling, Kedah, Malaysia
- Party: Malaysian Islamic Party (PAS)
- Other political affiliations: Perikatan Nasional (PN)
- Education: Universiti Kebangsaan Malaysia; International Islamic University Malaysia
- Occupation: Politician

Ahmad Fakhruddin bin (Sheikh) Fakhrurazi (born 27 April 1971) is a Malaysian politician who has served as the Member of Parliament (MP) for Kuala Kedah since November 2022. He is a member and State Deputy Commissioner II of Kedah of the Malaysian Islamic Party (PAS), a component party of the Perikatan Nasional (PN) coalition. He served as the State Commissioner of PAS of Kedah prior to July 2019.

== Election results ==
Kedah State Legislative Assembly
Year	Constituency	Candidate	Votes	Pct	Opponent(s)	Votes	Pct	Ballots cast	Majority	Turnout
2013	N26 Tanjong Dawai	Ahmad Fakhruddin Fakhrurazi (PAS)	14,038	45.07%	Tajul Urus Mat Zain (UMNO)	17,818	55.93%	31,856	3,780	88.30%
2018	N17 Pengkalan Kundor	Ahmad Fakhruddin Fakhrurazi (PAS)	9,008	33.42%	Ismail Salleh (AMANAH)	11,578	42.59%	27,597	2,490	82.90%
2018	N17 Pengkalan Kundor	Ahmad Fakhruddin Fakhrurazi (PAS)	9,008	33.42%	Abdul Halim Said (UMNO)	6,524	23.99%	27,597	2,490	82.90%

Parliament of Malaysia
Year	Constituency	Candidate	Votes	Pct	Opponent(s)	Votes	Pct	Ballots cast	Majority	Turnout
2022	P010 Kuala Kedah	Ahmad Fakhruddin Fakhrurazi (PAS)	56,298	56.03%	Azman Ismail (PKR)	28,237	28.10%	101,510	28,061	76.60%
2022	P010 Kuala Kedah	Ahmad Fakhruddin Fakhrurazi (PAS)	56,298	56.03%	Mashitah Ibrahim (UMNO)	13,879	13.81%	101,510	28,061	76.60%
2022	P010 Kuala Kedah	Ahmad Fakhruddin Fakhrurazi (PAS)	56,298	56.03%	Ulya Aqamah Husamudin (PEJUANG)	1,805	1.80%	101,510	28,061	76.60%
2022	P010 Kuala Kedah	Ahmad Fakhruddin Fakhrurazi (PAS)	56,298	56.03%	Syed Araniri Syed Ahmad (WARISAN)	256	0.25%	101,510	28,061	76.60%

== Honours ==
=== Honours of Malaysia ===
- Malaysia
  - Recipient of the 17th Yang di-Pertuan Agong Installation Medal (2024)
- Kedah
  - Companion of the Order of Loyalty to the Royal House of Kedah (SDK) (2021)
  - Recipient of the Meritorious Service Medal (PJK) (2012)

== See also ==
- Members of the Dewan Rakyat, 15th Malaysian Parliament
