= Mashitah Ibrahim =

Malaysian politician (born 1964)

Yang Berbahagia Dato' Mashitah Ibrahim DSDK DIMP JP
- ماشطة إبراهيم

Ministerial roles
- 2004–2008: Parliamentary Secretary in the Prime Minister's Department
- 2008–2013: Deputy Minister in the Prime Minister's Department

Faction represented in Dewan Rakyat
- 2004–2008: Barisan Nasional

Faction represented in Dewan Negara
- 2008–2014: Barisan Nasional

Personal details
- Born: Mashitah binti Ibrahim; 9 October 1964 (age 61) Alor Setar, Kedah
- Citizenship: Malaysian
- Party: United Malays National Organisation (UMNO)
- Other political affiliations: Barisan Nasional (BN)
- Spouse: Abdul Shakor Abu Bakar
- Children: 4
- Education: Maktab Mahmud Alor Setar
- Alma mater: Cairo University; International Islamic University Malaysia; Al-Azhar University
- Occupation: Politician
- Profession: Lecturer

Mashitah binti Ibrahim (Jawi: ماشطة ابراهيم) (born 9 October 1964) is a Malaysian politician. She is a member of the United Malays National Organisation (UMNO), a component party in Barisan Nasional (BN) coalition. She served as the Senator as well as the Deputy Minister in the Prime Minister's Department in charge of Islamic affairs from 2008 to 2013 and Member of Parliament for Baling from 2004 to 2008.

== Election results ==
Parliament of Malaysia
Year	Constituency	Candidate	Votes	Pct	Opponent(s)	Votes	Pct	Ballots cast	Majority	Turnout
2004	P016 Baling	Mashitah Ibrahim (UMNO)	32,661	53.46%	Taib Azamudden Md Taib (PAS)	28,432	46.54%	62,202	4,229	83.27%
2022	P010 Kuala Kedah	Mashitah Ibrahim (UMNO)	13,879	13.81%	Ahmad Fakhruddin Fakhrurazi (PAS)	56,298	56.03%	101,510	28,061	76.60%
2022	P010 Kuala Kedah	Mashitah Ibrahim (UMNO)	13,879	13.81%	Azman Ismail (PKR)	28,237	28.10%	101,510	28,061	76.60%
2022	P010 Kuala Kedah	Mashitah Ibrahim (UMNO)	13,879	13.81%	Ulya Aqamah Husamudin (PEJUANG)	1,805	1.80%	101,510	28,061	76.60%
2022	P010 Kuala Kedah	Mashitah Ibrahim (UMNO)	13,879	13.81%	Syed Araniri Syed Ahmad (WARISAN)	256	0.25%	101,510	28,061	76.60%

== Honours ==
- Pahang
  - Knight Companion of the Order of the Crown of Pahang (DIMP) – Dato' (2000)
- Kedah
  - Knight Companion of the Order of Loyalty to the Royal House of Kedah (DSDK) – Dato' (2006)
  - Justice of the Peace (JP) (2016)
