= Othman Aziz =

Malaysian politician

Yang Berbahagia Dato' Wira Othman Aziz DGMK DSDK ASK
- عثمان عزيز

Deputy Minister of Finance I
- In office 27 June 2016 – 9 May 2018 Serving with Lee Chee Leong
- Monarchs: Abdul Halim (2016); Muhammad V (2016–2018)
- Minister: Najib Razak (Minister of Finance); Johari Abdul Ghani (Minister of Finance II)
- Preceded by: Johari Abdul Ghani
- Succeeded by: Amiruddin Hamzah

Senator Elected by the Kedah State Legislative Assembly
- In office 2 September 2020 – 5 November 2022 Serving with Ahmad Yahaya
- Monarch: Abdullah
- Prime Minister: Muhyiddin Yassin (2020–2021); Ismail Sabri Yaakob (2021–2022)
- Preceded by: Mohd Suhaimi Abdullah & Ananthan Somasundaram
- Succeeded by: Abdul Nasir Idris & Musoddak Ahmad

Member of the Malaysian Parliament for Jerlun
- In office 5 May 2013 – 9 May 2018
- Preceded by: Mukhriz Mahathir (BN–UMNO)
- Succeeded by: Mukhriz Mahathir (PH–BERSATU)
- Majority: 3,270 (2013)

Kedah State Executive Council
- 2005–2007: Chairman of the Youth and Sports
- 2007–2008: Chairman of the Tourism, Youth and Sports

Member of the Kedah State Legislative Assembly for Ayer Hitam
- In office 21 March 2004 – 8 March 2008
- Preceded by: Abdul Ghani Ahmad (PAS)
- Succeeded by: Abdul Ghani Ahmad (PR–PAS)
- Majority: 860 (2004)

Faction represented in Dewan Negara
- 2020–2022: Barisan Nasional

Faction represented in Dewan Rakyat
- 2013–2018: Barisan Nasional

Faction represented in the Kedah State Legislative Assembly
- 2004–2008: Barisan Nasional

Personal details
- Born: Othman bin Aziz; 15 May 1959 (age 67) Alor Setar, Kedah, Federation of Malaya
- Citizenship: Malaysia
- Party: United Malays National Organisation (UMNO)
- Other political affiliations: Barisan Nasional (BN)
- Spouse: Soliha Hisham
- Education: Universiti Teknologi MARA; National University of Malaysia
- Occupation: Politician

Othman bin Aziz (born 15 May 1959) is a Malaysian politician. He was the Member of Parliament (MP) for Jerlun from 5 May 2013 to 9 May 2018 and had served as a Senator from 2020 until 2022. He had served one term as Member of the Kedah State Legislative Assembly for Ayer Hitam from 21 March 2004 to 8 March 2008 and was the Chairman of the Kedah Tourism Action Council. He is a member and the Division Chief of Jerlun of the United Malays National Organisation (UMNO), a component party of the Barisan Nasional (BN) coalition.

== Early life, education and early career ==
Othman was born in Alor Setar, Kedah. He received his primary education at the Sekolah Kebangsaan Ayer Hitam, Kedah. He continued his secondary education in Kolej Sultan Abdul Hamid and later went to University Technology of MARA to study a Diploma in Business Administration. After completing his diploma he went to the National University of Malaysia and graduated with Bachelor of Marketing Studies. He subsequently held a number of positions in corporate enterprises.

== Political career ==
In the 2004 general election, Othman was elected to the state assembly of Kedah, defeating the incumbent Malaysian Islamic Party (PAS) assemblyman Abdul Ghani Ahmad by 860 votes in the seat of Ayer Hitam. In 2005 he was appointed to the Executive Council of the Kedah state government by the incoming Chief Minister Mahdzir Khalid. During this time he also managed the Kedah Football Association. He was a casualty of the Barisan Nasional state government's defeat in the 2008 election, as he lost his seat by 506 votes to his predecessor, Abdul Ghani.

In the 2013 election, Othman ran for the UMNO-held federal seat of Jerlun. Jerlun was being vacated by Mukhriz Mahathir, who was seeking to move to state politics to become Kedah's Chief Minister. Othman defeated Malaysian Islamic Party (PAS)'s Ismail Salleh by 3,270 votes, winning election to the federal parliament.

In the 2018 election, Othman lost to Mukhriz Mahathir, who was back contesting but under the Malaysian United Indigenous Party (PPBM) ticket, in a three-corner fight with Abdul Ghani Ahmad of PAS for the Jerlun parliamentary seat.

== Election results ==
Kedah State Legislative Assembly
Year	Constituency	Candidate	Votes	Pct	Opponent(s)	Votes	Pct	Ballot cast	Majority	Turnout
2004	N04 Ayer Hitam	Othman Aziz (UMNO)	10,759	52.08%	Abd Ghani Ahmad (PAS)	9,899	47.92%	20,934	860	83.94%
2008	N04 Ayer Hitam	Othman Aziz (UMNO)	10,146	48.78%	Abd Ghani Ahmad (PAS)	10,652	51.22%	21,170	506	82.24%

Parliament of Malaysia
Year	Constituency	Candidate	Votes	Pct	Opponent(s)	Votes	Pct	Ballot cast	Majority	Turnout
2013	P005 Jerlun	Othman Aziz (UMNO)	24,161	53.63%	Ismail Salleh (PAS)	20,891	46.37%	45,899	3,270	87.62%
2018	P005 Jerlun	Othman Aziz (UMNO)	12,413	28.25%	Mukhriz Mahathir (BERSATU)	18,695	42.55%	44,822	5,866	82.80%
2018	P005 Jerlun	Othman Aziz (UMNO)	12,413	28.25%	Abdul Ghani Ahmad (PAS)	12,829	29.20%	44,822	5,866	82.80%
2022	P005 Jerlun	Othman Aziz (UMNO)	11,229	21.51%	Abd Ghani Ahmad (PAS)	31,685	60.69%	52,207	20,456	77.23%
2022	P005 Jerlun	Othman Aziz (UMNO)	11,229	21.51%	Mohamed Fadzli Mohd Ali (PKR)	6,149	11.78%	52,207	20,456	77.23%
2022	P005 Jerlun	Othman Aziz (UMNO)	11,229	21.51%	Mukhriz Mahathir (PEJUANG)	3,144	6.02%	52,207	20,456	77.23%

== Honours ==
- Kedah
  - Knight Commander of the Glorious Order of the Crown of Kedah (DGMK) – Dato' Wira (2017)
  - Knight Companion of the Order of Loyalty to the Royal House of Kedah (DSDK) – Dato' (2007)
  - Companion of the Ahli Cemerlang Semangat Jerai Kedah (ASK) (2008)

== See also ==
- Members of the Dewan Negara, 14th Malaysian Parliament
- List of people who have served in both Houses of the Malaysian Parliament
