= Pengkalan Kundor =

Pengkalan Kundor (N17)
Kedah constituency

State constituency
- Legislature: Kedah State Legislative Assembly
MLA
Mardhiyyah Johari
PN
- Constituency created: 1974
- First contested: 1974
- Last contested: 2023

Demographics
- Electors (2023): 46,235

Pengkalan Kundor is a state constituency in Kedah, Malaysia, that has been represented in the Kedah State Legislative Assembly.

== Demographics ==
Ethnic breakdown of Pengkalan Kundor's electorate as of 2023
1. Malay (72.1%)
2. Chinese (26.2%)
3. Indian (1.30%)
4. Other ethnicities (0.40%)

== History ==
=== Polling districts ===
According to the gazette issued on 30 March 2018, the Pengkalan Kundor constituency has a total of 17 polling districts.

State constituency	Polling districts	Code	Location
Pengkalan Kundor（N17）	Telok Kechai	010/17/01	SK Telok Kechai
Pengkalan Kundor（N17）	Taman Sophia	010/17/02	SMK Tun Sharifah Rodziah
Pengkalan Kundor（N17）	Taman Muara	010/17/03	Sk Haji Salleh Masri
Pengkalan Kundor（N17）	Telok Bagan	010/17/04	SR Islam Darul Ulum (SRIDU)
Pengkalan Kundor（N17）	Kebun Pinang	010/17/05	SK Kebun Pinang
Pengkalan Kundor（N17）	Tebengau	010/17/06	SK Tebengau
Pengkalan Kundor（N17）	Kampung Benua	010/17/07	SJK (C) Eik Choon
Pengkalan Kundor（N17）	Taman Cengkeh	010/17/08	SJK (C) Yih Min
Pengkalan Kundor（N17）	Simpang Empat	010/17/09	SK Hj Hasan Itam
Pengkalan Kundor（N17）	Selarong Panjang	010/17/10	SMK Tuanku Abdul Aziz
Pengkalan Kundor（N17）	Permatang Ibus	010/17/11	SK Kangkong
Pengkalan Kundor（N17）	Kuala Sala	010/17/12	SK Sri Mahawangsa
Pengkalan Kundor（N17）	Sala Kechil	010/17/13	SK Kampung Jawa
Pengkalan Kundor（N17）	Selarong Batang	010/17/14	SMA Ihya Ul-Ulum Ad Diniah
Pengkalan Kundor（N17）	Buloh Lima	010/17/15	SK Buluh Lima
Pengkalan Kundor（N17）	Taman Impian	010/17/16	SMK Muadzam Shah
Pengkalan Kundor（N17）	Kota Sarang Samut	010/17/17	SJK (C) Min Sin

=== Representation history ===
Members of the Legislative Assembly for Pengkalan Kundor
Parliament	No	Years	Member	Party
Constituency from Kota Star Barat, Langkawi and Kangkong-Bukit Raya
4th	N08	1974–1978	Ahmad Awang	BN (PAS)
5th	N08	1978–1982	Jamaluddin Lebai Bakar	BN (UMNO)
6th	N08	1982–1986	Jamaluddin Lebai Bakar	BN (UMNO)
7th	N12	1986–1990	Syed Razak Syed Zain Barakbah	BN (UMNO)
8th	N12	1990–1995	Syed Razak Syed Zain Barakbah	BN (UMNO)
9th	N17	1995–1999	Mohd Jamil Md Idross	BN (UMNO)
10th	N17	1999–2004	Phahrolrazi Zawawi	BA (PAS)
11th	N17	2004–2008	Mohd Jamil Md Idross	BN (UMNO)
12th	N17	2008–2013	Phahrolrazi Zawawi	PR (PAS)
13th	N17	2013–2015	Phahrolrazi Zawawi	PR (PAS)
13th	N17	2015–2018	Phahrolrazi Zawawi	AMANAH
14th	N17	2018–2023	Ismail Salleh	PH (AMANAH)
15th	N17	2023–present	Mardhiyyah Johari	PN (PAS)

== Election results ==
Kedah state election, 2023: Pengkalan Kundor
Party	Candidate	Votes	%	∆%
PN	Mardhiyyah Johari	22,349	66.38	▲66.38
PH	Ismail Salleh	11,317	33.62	▼8.96
Total valid votes		33,666	100.00	
Total rejected ballots		159		
Unreturned ballots		43		
Turnout		33,868	73.25	▼9.05
Registered electors		46,235		
Majority		11,032	32.76	▲23.60
PN gain from PKR		Swing		?

Kedah state election, 2018: Pengkalan Kundor
Party	Candidate	Votes	%	∆%
PKR	Ismail Salleh	11,578	42.58	▲42.58
PAS	Ahmad Fakhruddin Fakhrurazi	9,088	33.42	▼23.72
BN	Abdul Halim Said	6,524	23.99	▼18.86
Total valid votes		27,190	100.00	
Total rejected ballots		324		
Unreturned ballots		0		
Turnout		27,597	82.30	▼4.40
Registered electors		33,277		
Majority		2,490	9.16	▼5.14
PKR gain from PAS		Swing		?

Kedah state election, 2013: Pengkalan Kundor
Party	Candidate	Votes	%	∆%
PAS	Phahrolrazi Zawawi	15,526	57.15	▲0.06
BN	Noor Hasita Mat Isa	11,642	42.85	▼0.06
Total valid votes		27,168	100.00	
Total rejected ballots		314		
Unreturned ballots		86		
Turnout		27,568	86.70	▲7.40
Registered electors		31,788		
Majority		2,490	14.30	▲0.12
PAS hold		Swing		

Kedah state election, 2008: Pengkalan Kundor
Party	Candidate	Votes	%	∆%
PAS	Phahrolrazi Zawawi	12,575	57.09	▲14.98
BN	Mohd Jamil Hj Md Idross	9,453	42.91	▼14.98
Total valid votes		22,028	100.00	
Total rejected ballots		257		
Unreturned ballots		0		
Turnout		22,285	79.30	▼2.81
Registered electors		28,102		
Majority		3,122	14.18	▼1.60
PAS gain from BN		Swing		?

Kedah state election, 2004: Pengkalan Kundor
Party	Candidate	Votes	%	∆%
BN	Mohd Jamil Hj Md Idross	12,584	57.89	▲9.95
PAS	Phahrolrazi Zawawi	9,155	42.11	▼9.95
Total valid votes		21,739	100.00	
Total rejected ballots		283		
Unreturned ballots		98		
Turnout		22,120	82.11	▲5.26
Registered electors		26,939		
Majority		3,429	15.78	▲11.66
BN gain from PAS		Swing		?

Kedah state election, 1999: Pengkalan Kundor
Party	Candidate	Votes	%	∆%
PAS	Phahrolrazi Zawawi	8,817	52.06	▲6.98
BN	Abd Ghani Jamaludin	8,120	47.94	▼6.98
Total valid votes		16,937	100.00	
Total rejected ballots		283		
Unreturned ballots		8		
Turnout		17,228	76.85	▲0.71
Registered electors		22,418		
Majority		697	4.12	▼5.72
PAS gain from BN		Swing		?

Kedah state election, 1995: Pengkalan Kundor
Party	Candidate	Votes	%	∆%
BN	Mohd Jamil Hj Md Idross	8,290	54.92	▲1.35
PAS	Mohd Muslim Othman	6,805	45.08	▼1.35
Total valid votes		15,095	100.00	
Total rejected ballots		204		
Unreturned ballots		283		
Turnout		15,582	76.14	▲1.51
Registered electors		20,466		
Majority		1,485	9.84	▲2.70
BN hold		Swing		

Kedah state election, 1990: Pengkalan Kundor
Party	Candidate	Votes	%	∆%
BN	Haji Syed Razak Haji Syed Zain	8,527	53.57	▼2.84
PAS	Phahrolrazi Zawawi	7,362	46.43	▲2.84
Total valid votes		15,889	100.00	
Total rejected ballots		265		
Unreturned ballots		0		
Turnout		16,254	74.63	▲3.21
Registered electors		21,780		
Majority		1,165	7.14	▼5.68
BN hold		Swing		

Kedah state election, 1986: Pengkalan Kundor
Party	Candidate	Votes	%	∆%
BN	Haji Syed Razak Haji Syed Zain	8,329	56.41	▼4.42
PAS	Halim Arshat	6,435	43.59	▲11.66
Total valid votes		14,764	100.00	
Total rejected ballots		460		
Unreturned ballots		0		
Turnout		15,224	71.42	▼0.70
Registered electors		21,316		
Majority		1,894	12.82	▼16.08
BN hold		Swing		

Kedah state election, 1982: Pengkalan Kundor
Party	Candidate	Votes	%	∆%
BN	Haji Jamaludin Lebai Bakar	10,652	60.83	▲3.71
PAS	Haji Yusop Arshad	5,672	31.93	▼10.93
DAP	Wong Kok Wah	1,187	7.24	▲7.24
Total valid votes		17,511	100.00	
Total rejected ballots		251		
Unreturned ballots		0		
Turnout		17,762	72.12	
Registered electors		24,627		
Majority		4,980	28.90	▲14.66
BN hold		Swing		

Kedah state election, 1978: Pengkalan Kundor
Party	Candidate	Votes	%	∆%
BN	Haji Jamaludin Lebai Bakar	8,539	57.12	▼15.58
PAS	Ahmad Awang	6,411	42.88	▲42.88
Total valid votes		14,950	100.00	
Total rejected ballots		700		
Unreturned ballots		0		
Turnout		15,650	72.12	▲5.72
Registered electors		21,604		
Majority		2,128	14.24	▼35.76
BN hold		Swing		

Kedah state election, 1974: Pengkalan Kundor
Party	Candidate	Votes	%
BN	Ahmad Awang	8,315	72.70
Parti Sosialis Rakyat Malaysia	Siti Nor Abdul Hamid	2,596	22.70
Independent	Abdul Wahab Awang	526	4.60
Total valid votes		11,437	100.00
Total rejected ballots		753	
Unreturned ballots		0	
Turnout		12,190	66.40
Registered electors		18,364	
Majority		5,719	50.00
This was a new constituency created.
