= Ayer Hitam (state constituency) =

Political subdivision in Malaysia

Ayer Hitam (N04)
Kedah constituency

State constituency
- Legislature: Kedah State Legislative Assembly
MLA
Azhar Ibrahim
PN
- Constituency created: 1994
- First contested: 1995
- Last contested: 2023

Demographics
- Electors (2023): 37,819

Ayer Hitam is a state constituency in Kedah, Malaysia, that is represented in the Kedah State Legislative Assembly.

== Demographics ==
Ethnic breakdown of Ayer Hitam's electorate as of 2023
1. Malay (90.2%)
2. Chinese (6.58%)
3. Other ethnicities (3.09%)
4. Indian (0.09%)

== History ==
=== Polling districts ===
According to the gazette issued on 30 March 2018, the Ayer Hitam constituency has a total of 18 polling districts.

State constituency	Polling districts	Code	Location
Ayer Hitam (N04)	Padang Sera	005/04/01	SK Siputeh
Ayer Hitam (N04)	Kampung Melele	005/04/02	SMA Nahdhah Hasanah Melele, Padang Sera
Ayer Hitam (N04)	Kampung Putat	005/04/03	SK Putat
Ayer Hitam (N04)	Kampung Imam	005/04/04	SMK Megat Dewa
Ayer Hitam (N04)	Telaga Batu	005/04/05	SMK Tuanku Seri Indera Putera
Ayer Hitam (N04)	Padang Perahu	005/04/06	SK Padang Perahu
Ayer Hitam (N04)	Kampung Pida	005/04/07	SK Pida Tiga
Ayer Hitam (N04)	Kampung Gurindam	005/04/08	SK Pulau Chapa
Ayer Hitam (N04)	Alor Biak	005/04/09	SJK (C) Yuh Min
Ayer Hitam (N04)	Kubang Sepat	005/04/10	SK Seri Muda
Ayer Hitam (N04)	Lana Bulu	005/04/11	SK Dato' Sri Syed Ahmad
Ayer Hitam (N04)	Permatang Paku	005/04/12	SK Matang Paku
Ayer Hitam (N04)	Matang Bonglai	005/04/13	SK Tunku Laksamana
Ayer Hitam (N04)	Jerlun	005/04/14	SK Jerlun
Ayer Hitam (N04)	Lubok Pinang	005/04/15	SK Ayer Hitam
Ayer Hitam (N04)	Pekan Ayer Hitam	005/04/16	SJK (C) Yuh Min
Ayer Hitam (N04)	Kampung Gandai	005/04/17	SMK Ayer Hitam
Ayer Hitam (N04)	Kubang Nipah	005/04/18	SMK Jerlun

=== Representation history ===
Members of the Legislative Assembly for Ayer Hitam
Parliament	No	Years	Member	Party
Constituency created from Jerlun
9th	N03	1995–1999	Abdul Rahman Ariffin	BN (UMNO)
10th	N03	1999–2004	Abdul Ghani Ahmad	PAS
11th	N04	2004–2008	Othman Aziz	BN (UMNO)
12th	N04	2008–2013	Abdul Ghani Ahmad	PR (PAS)
13th	N04	2013–2016	Mukhriz Mahathir	BN (UMNO)
13th	N04	2016–2018	Mukhriz Mahathir	PH (BERSATU)
14th	N04	2018–2020	Azhar Ibrahim	PAS
14th	N04	2020–2023	Azhar Ibrahim	PN (PAS)
15th	N04	2023–present	Azhar Ibrahim	PN (PAS)

== Election results ==
Kedah state election, 2023
Party	Candidate	Votes	%	∆%
PN	Azhar Ibrahim	22,078	78.34	▲78.34
BN	Hayazi Azizan	6,105	21.66	▼7.06
Total valid votes		28,183	100.00	
Total rejected ballots		163		
Unreturned ballots		23		
Turnout		28,369	75.01	▼8.78
Registered electors		37,819		
Majority		15,973	56.68	▲54.54
PN hold		Swing		?

Kedah state election, 2018
Party	Candidate	Votes	%	∆%
PAS	Azhar Ibrahim	9,229	36.71	▼8.53
PKR	A.Aziz Mohammad	8,692	34.57	▲34.57
BN	Abu Hassan Sharif	7,220	28.72	▼26.04
Total valid votes		25,141	100.00	
Total rejected ballots		372		
Unreturned ballots		118		
Turnout		25,631	83.79	▼4.81
Registered electors		30,588		
Majority		537	2.14	▼7.38
PAS gain from BN		Swing		?

Kedah state election, 2013
Party	Candidate	Votes	%	∆%
BN	Mukhriz Mahathir	14,083	54.76	▲5.98
PAS	Abdul Ghani Ahmad	11,637	45.24	▼5.98
Total valid votes		25,720	100.00	
Total rejected ballots		382		
Unreturned ballots		98		
Turnout		26,196	88.60	▲6.36
Registered electors		29,567		
Majority		2,446	9.52	▲7.08
BN gain from PAS		Swing		?

Kedah state election, 2008
Party	Candidate	Votes	%	∆%
PAS	Abdul Ghani Ahmad	10,652	51.22	▲3.30
BN	Othman Aziz	10,146	48.78	▼3.30
Total valid votes		20,798	100.00	
Total rejected ballots		352		
Unreturned ballots		21		
Turnout		21,170	82.24	▼1.70
Registered electors		25,742		
Majority		506	2.44	▼1.72
PAS gain from BN		Swing		?

Kedah state election, 2004
Party	Candidate	Votes	%	∆%
BN	Othman Aziz	10,759	52.08	▲2.50
PAS	Abdul Ghani Ahmad	9,899	47.92	▼2.50
Total valid votes		20,658	100.00	
Total rejected ballots		277		
Unreturned ballots		0		
Turnout		20,934	83.94	▲5.64
Registered electors		24,939		
Majority		860	4.16	▲3.31
BN gain from PAS		Swing		?

Kedah state election, 1999
Party	Candidate	Votes	%	∆%
PAS	Abdul Ghani Ahmad	8,558	50.42	▲5.65
BN	Abdul Rahman Ariffin	8,414	49.58	▼5.65
Total valid votes		16,972	100.00	
Total rejected ballots		369		
Unreturned ballots		5		
Turnout		17,346	78.30	▲2.47
Registered electors		22,153		
Majority		144	0.85	▼9.61
PAS gain from BN		Swing		?

Kedah state election, 1995
Party	Candidate	Votes	%
BN	Abdul Rahman Ariffin	9,069	55.23
PAS	Hashim Osman	7,352	44.77
Total valid votes		16,421	100.00
Total rejected ballots		296	
Unreturned ballots		8	
Turnout		16,724	75.83
Registered electors		22,055	
Majority		1,717	10.46
This was a new constituency created.
