= Kuala Nerang (state constituency) =

Constituency in Malaysia

Kuala Nerang (N07)
Kedah constituency

State constituency
- Legislature: Kedah State Legislative Assembly
MLA
Mohamad Yusoff Zakaria
PN
- Constituency created: 1974
- First contested: 1974
- Last contested: 2023

Demographics
- Electors (2023): 31,481

Kuala Nerang is a state constituency in Kedah, Malaysia, that has been represented in the Kedah State Legislative Assembly.

== Demographics ==
As of 2020, Kuala Nerang has a population of 34,425 people.

Ethnic breakdown of Kuala Nerang's electorate as of 2023
1. Malay (96.8%)
2. Other ethnicities (1.57%)
3. Chinese (1.51%)
4. Indian (0.16%)

== History ==
=== Polling districts ===
According to the gazette issued on 30 March 2018, the Kuala Nerang constituency has a total of 17 polling districts.

| State constituency | Polling districts | Code | Location |
|---|---|---|---|
| Kuala Nerang (N07） | Padang Sanai | 007/07/01 | SK Padang Sanai |
| Kuala Nerang (N07） | Kuala Palas | 007/07/02 | SK Kubang Palas |
| Kuala Nerang (N07） | Gula Padang Terap | 007/07/03 | SMK Padang Terap |
| Kuala Nerang (N07） | Padang Nyior | 007/07/04 | Maktab Mahmud Padang Terap |
| Kuala Nerang (N07） | Kampung Pisang | 007/07/05 | Maktab Mahmud Padang Terap |
| Kuala Nerang (N07） | Kampung Tanjong | 007/07/06 | SK Padang Terap |
| Kuala Nerang (N07） | Tualak | 007/07/07 | SK Tualak |
| Kuala Nerang (N07） | Belimbing | 007/07/08 | SK Tualak |
| Kuala Nerang (N07） | Kampung Bendang | 007/07/09 | SK Tuanku Abdul Rahman Putra |
| Kuala Nerang (N07） | Perik | 007/07/10 | SK Perik |
| Kuala Nerang (N07） | Kurong Hitam | 007/07/11 | SK Kurong Hitam |
| Kuala Nerang (N07） | Pekan Kuala Nerang | 007/07/12 | SMK Dato' Syed Ahmad |
| Kuala Nerang (N07） | Rambutan | 007/07/13 | SK Seri Bakti |
| Kuala Nerang (N07） | Kampung Nai Teh | 007/07/14 | SK Toh Puan Sharifah Hanifah |
| Kuala Nerang (N07） | Bukit Tembaga | 007/07/15 | SK Bukit Tembaga |
| Kuala Nerang (N07） | Kampung Barokhas | 007/07/16 | SMK Kuala Nerang |
| Kuala Nerang (N07） | Nako Nambua | 007/07/17 | SK Panglima Awang |

=== Representation history ===
Kedah State Legislative Assemblyman for Kuala Nerang
| Assembly | No | Years | Member | Party |
Constituency created from Padang Terap
| 4th | N05 | 1974–1978 | Syed Ahmad Syed Mahmud Shahabudin | BN (UMNO) |
| 5th | N05 | 1978–1982 | Azizah Lebai Taib | BN (UMNO) |
| 6th | N05 | 1982–1986 | Azizah Lebai Taib | BN (UMNO) |
| 7th | N05 | 1986–1990 | Awang Ahmad @ Abdul Rashid Haji Sulaiman | BN (UMNO) |
| 8th | N05 | 1990–1995 | Awang Ahmad @ Abdul Rashid Haji Sulaiman | BN (UMNO) |
| 9th | N07 | 1995–1999 | Abdul Lateh Mohd Saman | BN (UMNO) |
| 10th | N07 | 1999–2004 | Mohamad Yusoff Zakaria | PAS |
| 11th | N07 | 2004–2008 | Affifudin Haji Omar | BN (UMNO) |
| 12th | N07 | 2008–2013 | Syed Sobri Syed Hashim | BN (UMNO) |
| 13th | N07 | 2013–2018 | Badrol Hisham Hashim | BN (UMNO) |
| 14th | N07 | 2018–2020 | Mohamad Yusoff Zakaria | PAS |
| 14th | N07 | 2020–2023 | Mohamad Yusoff Zakaria | PN (PAS) |
| 15th | N07 | 2023–present | Mohamad Yusoff Zakaria | PN (PAS) |

== Election results ==
Kedah state election, 2023
| Party | Candidate | Votes | % | ∆% |
|---|---|---|---|---|
| PN | Mohamad Yusoff Zakaria | 19,661 | 82.35 | ▲82.35 |
| PH | Ridzwan Abu Bakar | 4,215 | 17.65 | ▲0.76 |
| Total valid votes | | 23,876 | 100.00 | |
| Total rejected ballots | | 165 | | |
| Unreturned ballots | | 26 | | |
| Turnout | | 24,067 | 76.45 | ▼8.35 |
| Registered electors | | 31,481 | | |
| Majority | | 15,446 | 64.70 | ▲56.60 |
| PN hold | | Swing | | |

Kedah state election, 2018
| Party | Candidate | Votes | % | ∆% |
|---|---|---|---|---|
| PAS | Mohamad Yusoff Zakaria | 9,118 | 45.61 | ▲1.49 |
| BN | Badrol Hisham Hashim | 7,499 | 37.51 | ▼17.14 |
| PKR | Pak Tuan Syed Fadzil Syed Embun | 3,376 | 16.89 | ▲16.89 |
| Total valid votes | | 19,993 | 100.00 | |
| Total rejected ballots | | 364 | | |
| Unreturned ballots | | 0 | | |
| Turnout | | 20,436 | 84.80 | ▼4.80 |
| Registered electors | | 24,094 | | |
| Majority | | 1,619 | 8.10 | ▼2.43 |
| PAS gain from BN | | Swing | | ? |

Kedah state election, 2013
| Party | Candidate | Votes | % | ∆% |
|---|---|---|---|---|
| BN | Badrol Hisham Hashim | 10,363 | 54.65 | ▲1.95 |
| PAS | Syed Ibrahim Syed Omar | 8,366 | 44.12 | ▼3.18 |
| Independent | Ahmad Mad Daud | 235 | 1.24 | ▲1.24 |
| Total valid votes | | 18,964 | 100.00 | |
| Total rejected ballots | | 380 | | |
| Unreturned ballots | | 49 | | |
| Turnout | | 19,393 | 89.60 | |
| Registered electors | | 21,651 | | |
| Majority | | 1,997 | 10.53 | ▲5.13 |
| BN hold | | Swing | | |

Kedah state election, 2008
| Party | Candidate | Votes | % | ∆% |
|---|---|---|---|---|
| BN | Syed Sobri Syed Hashim | 7,856 | 52.70 | ▼1.92 |
| PAS | Zawawi Hj Ahmad | 7,051 | 47.30 | ▲1.92 |
| Total valid votes | | 14,907 | 100.00 | |
| Total rejected ballots | | 309 | | |
| Unreturned ballots | | 29 | | |
| Turnout | | 15,245 | 89.60 | ▲3.52 |
| Registered electors | | 18,037 | | |
| Majority | | 805 | 5.40 | ▼3.84 |
| BN hold | | Swing | | |

Kedah state election, 2004
| Party | Candidate | Votes | % | ∆% |
|---|---|---|---|---|
| BN | Affifudin Haji Omar | 7,746 | 54.62 | ▲6.61 |
| PAS | Mohamad Yusoff Zakaria | 6,436 | 45.38 | ▼6.61 |
| Total valid votes | | 14,182 | 100.00 | |
| Total rejected ballots | | 244 | | |
| Unreturned ballots | | 6 | | |
| Turnout | | 14,432 | 86.08 | ▲2.76 |
| Registered electors | | 16,766 | | |
| Majority | | 1,310 | 9.24 | ▲5.26 |
| BN gain from PAS | | Swing | | ? |

Kedah state election, 1999
| Party | Candidate | Votes | % | ∆% |
|---|---|---|---|---|
| PAS | Mohamad Yusoff Zakaria | 5,841 | 51.99 | ▲2.04 |
| BN | Abd Lateh Hj Mohd Saman | 5,393 | 48.01 | ▼2.04 |
| Total valid votes | | 11,234 | 100.00 | |
| Total rejected ballots | | 311 | | |
| Unreturned ballots | | 8 | | |
| Turnout | | 11,555 | 83.32 | ▲6.65 |
| Registered electors | | 15,109 | | |
| Majority | | 446 | 3.98 | ▲3.88 |
| PAS gain from BN | | Swing | | ? |

Kedah state election, 1995
| Party | Candidate | Votes | % | ∆% |
|---|---|---|---|---|
| BN | Abd Lateh Hj Mohd Saman | 5,303 | 50.05 | ▼8.93 |
| PAS | Mohamad Yusoff Zakaria | 5,292 | 49.95 | ▲8.93 |
| Total valid votes | | 10,595 | 100.00 | |
| Total rejected ballots | | 367 | | |
| Unreturned ballots | | 25 | | |
| Turnout | | 10,987 | 76.67 | ▼2.78 |
| Registered electors | | 14,330 | | |
| Majority | | 11 | 0.10 | ▼17.86 |
| BN hold | | Swing | | |

Kedah state election, 1990
| Party | Candidate | Votes | % | ∆% |
|---|---|---|---|---|
| BN | Haji Awang Ahmad Haji Sulaiman | 11,043 | 58.98 | ▼0.52 |
| PAS | Ghazali Lebai Md. Saman | 7,679 | 41.02 | ▲0.52 |
| Total valid votes | | 18,722 | 100.00 | |
| Total rejected ballots | | 787 | | |
| Unreturned ballots | | 0 | | |
| Turnout | | 19,509 | 79.45 | ▲0.64 |
| Registered electors | | 24,554 | | |
| Majority | | 3,364 | 17.96 | ▼1.04 |
| BN hold | | Swing | | |

Kedah state election, 1986
| Party | Candidate | Votes | % | ∆% |
|---|---|---|---|---|
| BN | Haji Awang Ahmad @ Abdul Rashid Sulaiman | 9,993 | 59.50 | ▲1.45 |
| PAS | Abu Kassim L. Abdullah | 6,801 | 40.50 | ▼1.45 |
| Total valid votes | | 16,794 | 100.00 | |
| Total rejected ballots | | 567 | | |
| Unreturned ballots | | 0 | | |
| Turnout | | 17,361 | 78.81 | ▼3.69 |
| Registered electors | | 22,029 | | |
| Majority | | 3,192 | 19.00 | ▲2.90 |
| BN hold | | Swing | | |

Kedah state election, 1982
| Party | Candidate | Votes | % | ∆% |
|---|---|---|---|---|
| BN | Azizah L. Taib | 8,855 | 58.05 | ▲5.48 |
| PAS | Mahaudin Haji Ahmad | 6,398 | 41.95 | ▼5.48 |
| Total valid votes | | 15,253 | 100.00 | |
| Total rejected ballots | | 361 | | |
| Unreturned ballots | | 0 | | |
| Turnout | | 15,614 | 82.50 | ▼0.64 |
| Registered electors | | 18,926 | | |
| Majority | | 2,457 | 16.10 | ▲5.96 |
| BN hold | | Swing | | |

Kedah state election, 1978
| Party | Candidate | Votes | % | ∆% |
|---|---|---|---|---|
| BN | Azizah L. Taib | 6,424 | 52.57 | |
| PAS | Mahaudin Haji Ahmad | 5,797 | 42.43 | |
| Total valid votes | | 12,221 | 100.00 | |
| Total rejected ballots | | 571 | | |
| Unreturned ballots | | 0 | | |
| Turnout | | 12,792 | 83.14 | |
| Registered electors | | 15,385 | | |
| Majority | | 627 | 10.14 | |
| BN hold | | Swing | | |

Kedah state election, 1974
| Party | Candidate | Votes | % |
|---|---|---|---|
On Nomination Day, Dato' Syed Ahmad Syed Mahmud Shahabudin won uncontested.
| BN | Dato' Syed Ahmad Syed Mahmud Shahabudin | | |
| Total valid votes | | | 100.00 |
| Total rejected ballots | | | |
| Unreturned ballots | | | |
| Turnout | | | |
| Registered electors | | 16,774 | |
| Majority | | | |
This was a new constituency created.
