= Mardhiyyah Johari =

Malaysian politician

Yang Berhormat Puan Mardhiyyah Johari MLA
- مرضية جوهري

Member of the Kedah State Legislative Assembly for Pengkalan Kundor
- Incumbent
- Assumed office 12 August 2023
- Preceded by: Ismail Salleh (PH–AMANAH)
- Majority: 11,032 (2023)

Personal details
- Born: Mardhiyyah binti Johari Malaysia
- Party: Malaysian Islamic Party (PAS)
- Other political affiliations: Perikatan Nasional (PN)
- Occupation: Politician

Mardhiyyah binti Johari is a Malaysian politician. She was a member of the Kedah State Legislative Assembly (MLA) for Pengkalan Kundor since August 2023. She is a member of Malaysian Islamic Party (PAS), a component party of Perikatan Nasional (PN) coalitions.

== Election results ==
Kedah State Legislative Assembly
Year	Constituency	Candidate	Votes	Pct	Opponent(s)	Votes	Pct	Ballots cast	Majority	Turnout
2023	N17 Pengkalan Kundor	Mardhiyyah Johari (PAS)	22,349	66.38%	Ismail Salleh (AMANAH)	11,317	33.62%	33,868	11,032	73.25%
