= Ismail Salleh =

Malaysian politician

Yang Berbahagia Dato' Ismail Salleh DSDK AMK
- إسماعيل بن صالح

Member of the Kedah State Executive Council
- In office 1 August 2018 – 17 May 2020 (Health, Rural Development, Religion and State-owned Companies)
- Monarch: Sallehuddin
- Menteri Besar: Mukhriz Mahathir
- Preceded by: Himself (Health and Rural Development); Amiruddin Hamzah (Religion, State-owned companies)
- Succeeded by: Mohd Hayati Othman (Health); Siti Aishah Ghazali (Rural Development); Najmi Ahmad (Religion); Muhammad Sanusi Md Nor; Government-linked Companies)
- Constituency: Pengkalan Kundor
- In office 22 May 2018 – 1 August 2018 (Information, Health and Rural Development)
- Monarch: Sallehuddin
- Menteri Besar: Mukhriz Mahathir
- Preceded by: Mohd Tajudin Abdullah (Information, Rural Development); Leong Yong Kong (Health)
- Succeeded by: Mohd Firdaus Ahmad (Information); Himself (Health and Rural Development)
- Constituency: Pengkalan Kundor
- In office 2010 – 2013 (Non-governmental Organisations, Science, Innovation, Information Technology and Communication)
- Monarch: Abdul Halim
- Menteri Besar: Azizan Abdul Razak
- Constituency: Alor Mengkudu
- In office 2008 – 2010 (Health, Information, Non-governmental Organisations and Human Development)
- Monarch: Abdul Halim
- Menteri Besar: Azizan Abdul Razak
- Constituency: Alor Mengkudu

Member of the Kedah State Legislative Assembly for Pengkalan Kundor
- In office 9 May 2018 – 12 August 2023
- Preceded by: Phahrolrazi Mohd Zawawi (AMANAH)
- Succeeded by: Mardhiyyah Johari (PN–PAS)
- Majority: 2,490 (2018)

Member of the Kedah State Legislative Assembly for Alor Mengkudu
- In office 8 March 2008 – 5 May 2013
- Preceded by: Fadzil Hanafi (BN–UMNO)
- Succeeded by: Ahmad Yahaya (PR–PAS)
- Majority: 2,247 (2008)

Faction represented in Kedah State Legislative Assembly
- 2008–2013: Malaysian Islamic Party
- 2018–2023: Pakatan Harapan

Personal details
- Born: 20 September 1963 (age 62) Kuala Terengganu, Terengganu, Malaysia
- Citizenship: Malaysian
- Party: National Trust Party (AMANAH); Malaysian Islamic Party (PAS)
- Other political affiliations: Pakatan Harapan (PH); Pakatan Rakyat (PR); Barisan Alternatif (BA)
- Education: Catholic University Leuven (MD)
- Occupation: Politician

Ismail bin Salleh (born 20 September 1963) is a Malaysian politician and formerly served as Kedah State Executive Councillor. He is the Chairman of Muda Agricultural Development Authority (MADA).

== Election results ==
Kedah State Legislative Assembly
Year	Constituency	Candidate	Votes	Pct	Opponent(s)	Votes	Pct	Ballots cast	Majority	Turnout
2004	N12 Bakar Bata	Ismail Salleh (PAS)	5,054	31.30%	Ahmad Bashah Md Hanipah (UMNO)	11,091	68.70%	16,368	6,037	75.72%
2008	N14 Alor Mengkudu	Ismail Salleh (PAS)	9,208	56.95%	Mazlan Abdul Rahman (UMNO)	6,961	43.05%	16,460	2,247	77.73%
2018	N17 Pengkalan Kundor	Ismail Salleh (AMANAH)	11,578	42.59%	Ahmad Fakhruddin Fakhrurazi (PAS)	9,088	33.42%	27,597	2,490	82.90%
2018	N17 Pengkalan Kundor	Ismail Salleh (AMANAH)	11,578	42.59%	Abdul Halim Said (UMNO)	6,524	23.99%	27,597	2,490	82.90%
2023	N17 Pengkalan Kundor	Ismail Salleh (AMANAH)	11,317	33.62%	Mardhiyyah Johari (PAS)	22,349	66.38%	33,868	11,032	73.25%

Parliament of Malaysia
Year	Constituency	Candidate	Votes	Pct	Opponent(s)	Votes	Pct	Ballots cast	Majority	Turnout
2008	P042 Tasek Gelugor	Ismail Salleh (PAS)	15,901	43.75%	Nor Mohamed Yakcop (UMNO)	20,448	56.25%	37,308	4,547	83.90%
2013	P005 Jerlun	Ismail Salleh (PAS)	20,891	46.37%	Othman Aziz (UMNO)	24,161	53.63%	45,899	3,270	87.62%

== Honours ==
- Kedah
  - Knight Companion of the Order of Loyalty to the Royal House of Kedah (DSDK) – Dato' (2013)
  - Member of the Order of the Crown of Kedah (AMK) (2010)
