= Mukhriz Mahathir =

Malaysian politician and businessman

Yang Berbahagia Dato' Seri Utama Mukhriz Mahathir DMK SJMK SPMK DGSM DHMS DSNS DIMP JP
- مخرج محاضر
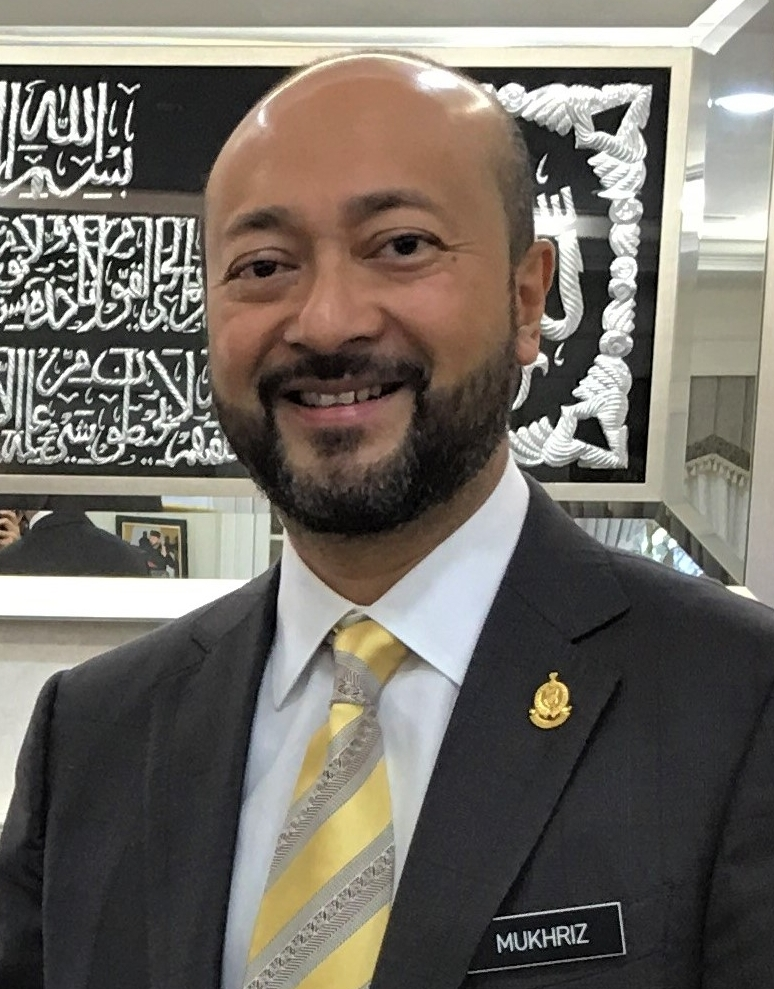
- Mukhriz in 2019

11th and 13th Menteri Besar of Kedah
- In office 11 May 2018 – 17 May 2020
- Monarch: Sallehuddin
- Preceded by: Ahmad Bashah Md Hanipah
- Succeeded by: Muhammad Sanusi Md Nor
- Constituency: Jitra
- In office 6 May 2013 – 3 February 2016
- Monarch: Abdul Halim
- Preceded by: Azizan Abdul Razak
- Succeeded by: Ahmad Bashah Md Hanipah
- Constituency: Ayer Hitam

Deputy Minister of International Trade and Industry
- In office 10 April 2009 – 15 May 2013 Serving with Jacob Dungau Sagan
- Monarchs: Mizan Zainal Abidin; Abdul Halim
- Prime Minister: Najib Razak
- Minister: Mustapa Mohamed
- Preceded by: Liew Vui Keong
- Succeeded by: Hamim Samuri
- Constituency: Jerlun

1st President of the Homeland Fighters Party
- Incumbent
- Assumed office 12 August 2020
- Deputy: Marzuki Yahya
- Chairman: Mahathir Mohamad
- Preceded by: Position established

1st Deputy President of the Malaysian United Indigenous Party
- In office 7 September 2016 – 28 May 2020
- President: Muhyiddin Yassin
- Chairman: Mahathir Mohamad (2016–2020); Muhyiddin Yassin (acting)
- Preceded by: Position established
- Succeeded by: Ahmad Faizal Azumu

Member of the Malaysian Parliament for Jerlun
- In office 9 May 2018 – 19 November 2022
- Preceded by: Othman Aziz (BN–UMNO)
- Succeeded by: Abdul Ghani Ahmad (PN–PAS)
- Majority: 5,866 (2018)
- In office 8 March 2008 – 5 May 2013
- Preceded by: Abd Rahman Ariffin (BN–UMNO)
- Succeeded by: Othman Aziz (BN–UMNO)
- Majority: 2,205 (2008)

Member of the Kedah State Legislative Assembly for Jitra
- In office 9 May 2018 – 12 August 2023
- Preceded by: Aminuddin Omar (BN–UMNO)
- Succeeded by: Haim Hilman Abdullah (PN–PAS)
- Majority: 10,849 (2018)

Member of the Kedah State Legislative Assembly for Ayer Hitam
- In office 5 May 2013 – 9 May 2018
- Preceded by: Abdul Ghani Ahmad (PR–PAS)
- Succeeded by: Azhar Ibrahim (GS–PAS)
- Majority: 2,446 (2013)

Personal details
- Born: Mukhriz bin Mahathir; 25 November 1964 (age 61) Alor Setar, Kedah, Malaysia
- Party: UMNO (2004–2016); Independent (June–August 2016, May–August 2020); BERSATU (2016–2020); PEJUANG (since 2020)
- Other political affiliations: Barisan Nasional (2004–2016); Pakatan Harapan (2017–2020); Gerakan Tanah Air (GTA) (2022–2023); Perikatan Nasional (2026–present)
- Spouse: Norzieta Zakaria
- Children: 4
- Parent(s): Mahathir Mohamad (father); Siti Hasmah (mother)
- Relatives: Mohamad Iskandar (grandfather)
- Education: Sophia University; Boston University
- Occupation: Politician; businessman
- Website: mukhriz.com
- Mukhriz Mahathir on Parliament of Malaysia

Mukhriz Mahathir

Faction represented in Dewan Rakyat
- 2008–2013: Barisan Nasional
- 2018–2020: Pakatan Harapan
- 2020: Malaysian United Indigenous Party
- 2020–2021: Independent
- 2021–2022: Party of Homeland's Fighters

Faction represented in Kedah State Legislative Assembly
- 2013–2016: Barisan Nasional
- 2016–2017: Independent
- 2017–2018: Malaysian United Indigenous Party
- 2018–2020: Pakatan Harapan
- 2020: Malaysian United Indigenous Party
- 2020: Independent
- 2020–2022: Party of Homeland's Fighters

Mukhriz bin Mahathir (Jawi: مخرج بن محاضر; born 25 November 1964) is a Malaysian politician and businessman who served as the 11th and 13th Menteri Besar of Kedah from May 2013 to February 2016 and again from May 2018 to May 2020, Deputy Minister of International Trade and Industry in the Barisan Nasional (BN) administration under former Prime Ministers Abdullah Ahmad Badawi and Najib Razak as well as former Minister Mustapa Mohamed from March 2008 to May 2013, Member of Parliament (MP) for Jerlun from March 2008 to May 2013 and again from May 2018 to November 2022 as well as Member of the Kedah State Legislative Assembly (MLA) for Jitra from May 2018 to August 2023 and for Ayer Hitam from May 2013 to May 2018. He is the third son of Mahathir Mohamad, the 4th and 7th Prime Minister of Malaysia. He has been the first and founding president of the Homeland Fighters Party (PEJUANG) since its foundation in August 2020. He was the first and founding deputy president and State Chairman of Kedah of the Malaysian United Indigenous Party (BERSATU) from party foundation in September 2016 to his membership termination in May 2020 and was also the State Chairman of Kedah of the Pakatan Harapan (PH) coalition. He was also a member of the United Malays National Organisation (UMNO), a component party of the BN coalition. He left UMNO with Mahathir and they founded BERSATU in 2016. Mahathir and his BERSATU memberships were terminated and they founded PEJUANG in 2020. He is one of the two Menteris Besar of Malaysia who represented two different political parties and coalitions.

== Early life, education and early career ==
Mukhriz was born in Alor Setar, Kedah, Malaysia and he is the fourth child among four siblings from the marriage of Mahathir Mohamad and Siti Hasmah.

Mukhriz attended Sophia University, in Tokyo, where he received a bachelor's degree in business management (assumed in 1987). He later received another bachelor's degree in marketing after graduating from Boston University (assumed in 1989).

Mukhriz has held various posts in several business firms, which include Opcom Holdings, Kosmo Tech as well as the Malaysian Franchise Association. He was also the executive director of Perdana Peace Global Organisation. He was Chairman of the Board of Directors of Malaysian cancer vaccine company, Bioven.

== Political career (2004–present) ==
=== Pre-parliamentary career ===
In 2004, he won election to the executive council of UMNO's youth wing, by garnering the highest number of votes of any candidate. He was also seen as a potential candidate for being the deputy chief of UMNO Youth, but he later withdrew his candidacy.

Mukhriz was noted for his continuous efforts in speaking for his father in the events of the rift between Prime Minister Abdullah Ahmad Badawi and his father. In 2006, his father lost a bid to be elected as one of seven delegates from Kubang Pasu to UMNO's general assembly; Mukhriz was elected as one of the seven.

=== Federal parliamentarian (2008–2013) ===
In the 2008 Malaysian general election, Mukhriz contested and won the Jerlun Parliament Seat. Before this, he offered himself to contest in Langkawi Parliament Seat but was rejected by 85 out of 91 UMNO branches in Langkawi. However, many Langkawi leaders backed him later. The Jerlun UMNO division welcomed Mukhriz to contest in their Parliament seat and promised to give him full support in the election.

In 2009, Mukhriz contested as a candidate for the new UMNO Youth Chief after the wing's predecessor, Datuk Seri Hishamuddin Hussein released his position. He was rivalled by Khairy Jamaluddin and Khir Toyo. Nominations for the posts coincided with division meetings which took place between October and November 2008. Mukhriz was initially seen as leading in nominations compared to Khairy but eventually lost in the final vote count.

However, a controversy was sparked when Khairy was allowed to contest for the post even though he was found guilty for being involved with money politics by the UMNO Disciplinary Board, while others who were found guilty for the same offence, such as Mohd Ali Rustam who was supposed to contest for the UMNO Vice-President post, were not allowed to contest for their respective posts. However, Khairy denied the allegation, as stated in his blog.

=== First term as Menteri Besar Kedah (2013–2016) ===
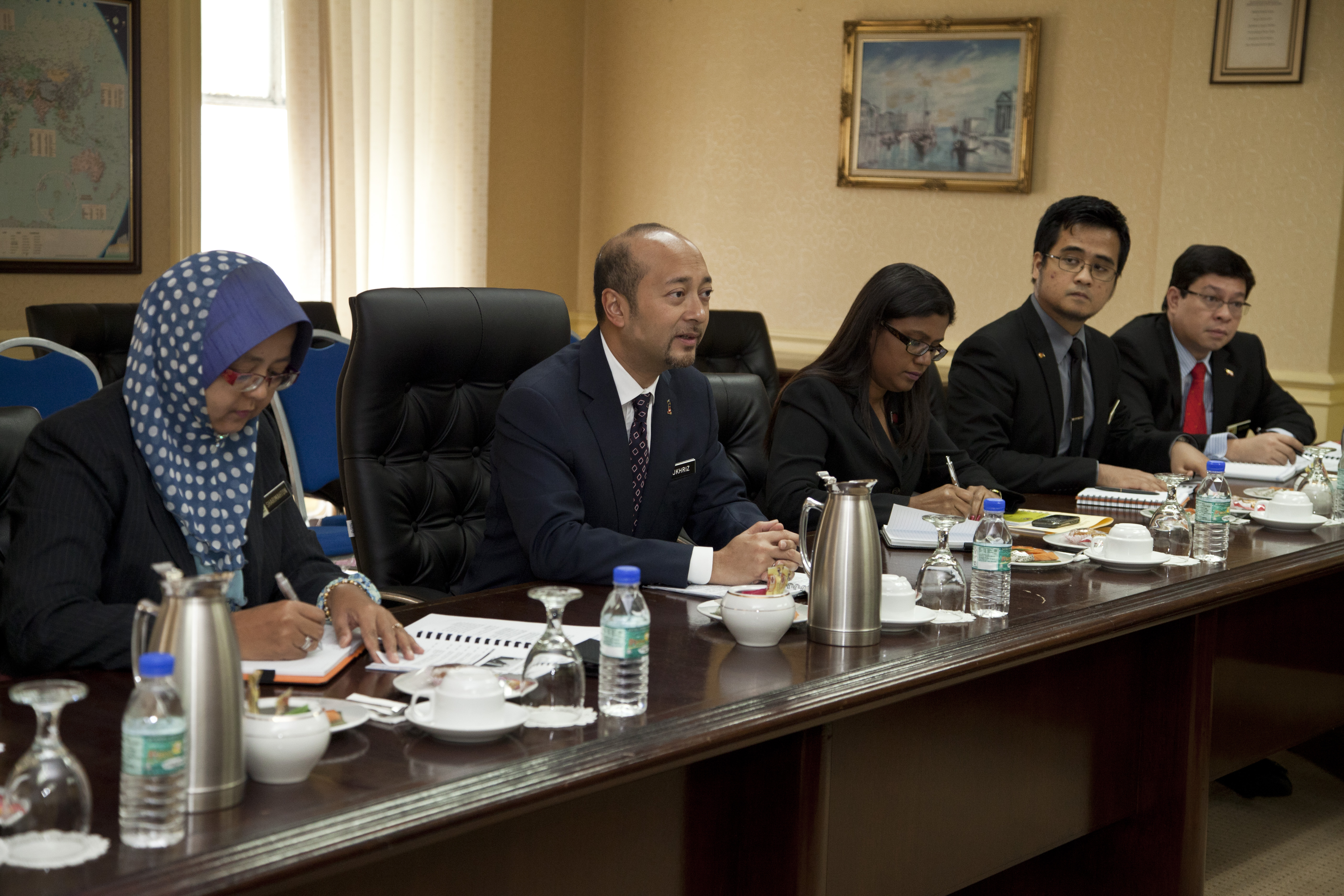
Mukhriz in 2013

In the 2013 election, Mukhriz gave up his seat in federal parliament to contest the Kedah State Assembly seat of Ayer Hitam. The move was taken with a view to becoming the Chief Minister of Kedah if the Barisan Nasional coalition could defeat the Pakatan Rakyat (PR) state government led by Azizan Abdul Razak. Mukhriz won Ayer Hitam (defeating the Pan-Malaysian Islamic Party (PAS) incumbent), Barisan Nasional reclaimed the state government, and Mukhriz was sworn in as Chief Minister on 6 May, the day after the election, in the presence of his father. Under Mukhriz's leadership, Kedah declared Thaipusam a public holiday for the first time in 2014, a policy that was later revoked by his successor, Muhammad Sanusi Md Nor.

His administration's 2014 state budget allocated RM5 million for the Affordable Homes programme, RM9 million for poverty eradication and living-standard assistance, and RM10 million for a soft-loan scheme for small entrepreneurs. The state government also abolished hawker licence fees from 1 January 2014 and allocated funds for road and bridge maintenance, public housing repairs, flood mitigation, drainage and irrigation projects.

Mukhriz sought to attract greater private investment to Kedah by strengthening Kedah Invest, the state's investment promotion agency, and promoting high-productivity industries alongside established sectors such as agriculture. In the 2015 state budget, his administration identified six proposed catalyst projects for economic development: Kulim International Airport, Kedah Aerocity, the Sungai Petani–Kedah Inner Expressway (SPIKE), Kedah Rubber City, Kedah Science and Technology Park, and Kedah Medical Science City. It also announced plans to establish a state economic council to facilitate investment and accelerate economic growth.

His administration also prioritised infrastructure and education. The 2015 budget allocated RM52.4 million for roads and related infrastructure, including the proposed Pendang Bypass and a bridge at Alor Merah linking Lebuhraya Darul Aman to Jalan Suka Menanti. Another RM24 million was allocated to upgrade and replace roads and bridges, while RM18 million was earmarked for programmes to improve students' academic performance. In October 2014, Mukhriz also announced federal approval for a proposed RM350 million river-diversion project intended to reduce flooding that damaged paddy fields and improve agricultural land affected by sinkholes. The project was expected to be implemented under the Eleventh Malaysia Plan.

==== 1MDB Scandal ====
In January 2016, UMNO Kedah leaders, led by Ahmad Bashah Md Hanipah, declare the loss of confidence towards Mukhriz due to "his inability to maintain a united party leadership". The move is widely believed to be a reprisal orchestrated by the Prime Minister Najib Razak's camp in UMNO, which was increasingly infuriated by Mahathir's and Mukhriz's criticisms against Najib. He resigned on 3 February 2016 after losing the majority of support among the assemblymen. Ahmad Bashah, who is also the Bakar Bata assemblyman, succeeded him as the 12th Chief Minister of Kedah.

Mukhriz was expelled from UMNO together with Muhyiddin Yassin in June 2016.

=== Parti Pribumi Bersatu Malaysia (BERSATU) (2016–2020) ===
In August 2016, Mukhriz together with Mahathir Mohamad, Muhyiddin Yassin, Syed Saddiq Syed Abdul Rahman, Kamarulazman Habibur Rahman, Anina Saadudin and Akhramsyah Sanusi formed Parti Pribumi Bersatu Malaysia (PPBM or BERSATU).

Mukhriz was the Deputy President of BERSATU and the Chairman of Pakatan Harapan in Kedah.

=== Second term as Menteri Besar Kedah (2018–2020) ===
In the 2018 general election, the Pakatan Harapan (PH) coalition led by former Prime Minister Mahathir Mohamad, Mukhriz's father, won 18 of the 36 state assembly seats.

He took his oath of office before Kedah Sultan Tunku Sallehuddin Ibni Almarhum Sultan Badlishah in a ceremony held in Istana Anak Bukit.

On 31 March 2019, Mukhriz has been appointed chairperson of the Muda Agricultural Development Authority (Mada). Agriculture and Agro-Based Industry Minister Salahuddin Ayub said Mukhriz’s appointment was consented by the Yang di-Pertuan Agong recently.

On 22 January 2020, Mukhriz said starting the new year bringing in investments from China is a good sign for the state. He shake hands with Jin Yeuhua at a signing ceremony at Wisma Darul Aman.

On 29 January 2020, Mukhriz said Kedah recorded a revenue of RM726.89 million in 2019, surpassing the target of RM710 million set by the state government last year.

On 17 May 2020, he resigned as Chief Minister of Kedah mentioning he couldn't hold on to majority amongst his state assemblymen and thus relinquished his position as Chief Minister of Kedah.

== Personal life ==
Mukhriz married Norzieta Zakaria on 14 November 1993, and together, they have four children.

On 27 August 2020, Mukhriz admitted that it was his daughter and son-in-law who were recently arrested by the police for breaching the recovery movement control order (MCO) rules. On 28 August, Mukhriz's daughter, Meera Alyanna Mukhriz, has apologised for breaching recovery movement-control order (RMCO) procedures by staying out past the 12pm closing time at an eatery.

== Election results ==
Kedah State Legislative Assembly
Year	Constituency	Candidate	Votes	Pct	Opponent(s)	Votes	Pct	Ballots cast	Majority	Turnout
2013	N04 Ayer Hitam	Mukhriz Mahathir (UMNO)	14,083	54.55%	Abd Ghani Ahmad (PAS)	11,637	45.07%	26,200	2,446	88.61%
2018	N06 Jitra	Mukhriz Mahathir (BERSATU)	18,852	55.03%	Aminuddin Omar (UMNO)	8,003	23.36%	34,252	10,849	83.00%
2018	N06 Jitra	Mukhriz Mahathir (BERSATU)	18,852	55.03%	Zulhazmi Othman (PAS)	7,064	20.62%	34,252	10,849	83.00%

Parliament of Malaysia
Year	Constituency	Candidate	Votes	Pct	Opponent(s)	Votes	Pct	Ballots cast	Majority	Turnout
2008	P005 Jerlun	Mukhriz Mahathir (UMNO)	19,424	53.01%	Idris Ahmad (PAS)	17,219	46.99%	37,297	2,205	81.95%
2018	P005 Jerlun	Mukhriz Mahathir (BERSATU)	18,695	41.86%	Othman Aziz (UMNO)	12,413	27.79%	44,822	5,866	83.00%
2018	P005 Jerlun	Mukhriz Mahathir (BERSATU)	18,695	41.86%	Abd Ghani Ahmad (PAS)	12,829	28.72%	44,822	5,866	83.00%
2022	P005 Jerlun	Mukhriz Mahathir (PEJUANG)	3,144	6.02%	Abd Ghani Ahmad (PAS)	31,685	60.69%	52,909	20,456	77.23%
2022	P005 Jerlun	Mukhriz Mahathir (PEJUANG)	3,144	6.02%	Othman Aziz (UMNO)	11,229	21.51%	52,909	20,456	77.23%
2022	P005 Jerlun	Mukhriz Mahathir (PEJUANG)	3,144	6.02%	Mohamed Fadzli Mohd Ali (PKR)	6,149	11.78%	52,909	20,456	77.23%

== Honours ==
- Kedah
  - Member of the Supreme Order of Sri Mahawangsa (DMK) – Dato' Seri Utama (2019)
  - Knight Grand Commander of the Order of the Crown of Kedah (SPMK) – Dato' Seri (2014)
  - Knight Commander of the Order of Loyalty to Sultan Abdul Halim Mu'adzam Shah (DHMS) – Dato' Paduka (2013)
  - Justice of the Peace (JP) (2015)
  - Recipient of the Sultan Sallehuddin Installation Medal (22 October 2018)
- Kelantan
  - Knight Grand Commander of the Order of the Life of the Crown of Kelantan (SJMK) – Dato' (2019)
- Malacca
  - Grand Commander of the Order of Malacca (DGSM) – Datuk Seri (2019)
- Negeri Sembilan
  - Knight Companion of the Order of Loyalty to Negeri Sembilan (DSNS) – Dato' (2003)
- Pahang
  - Knight Companion of the Order of the Crown of Pahang (DIMP) – Dato' (2010)

Government offices
Preceded by Azizan Abdul Razak	Chief Minister of Kedah; 2013-2016	Succeeded by Ahmad Bashah Md. Hanipah
Preceded by Ahmad Bashah Md. Hanipah	Chief Minister of Kedah; 2018-2020	Succeeded by Muhammad Sanusi Md Nor
